= 2016 Patriot League men's soccer season =

- League: NCAA Division I
- Sport: Soccer
- Duration: August, 2016 – November, 2016
- Teams: 10

2017 MLS SuperDraft
- Top draft pick: Ethan Kutler, Colgate
- Picked by: New York Red Bulls, 39th overall

Regular season
- Champions: American
- Runners-up: Loyola

Tournament
- Champions: Colgate

Patriot League men's soccer seasons
- ← 2015 2017 →

2016 Patriot League men's soccer standings
	Conf.					Overall
Team	W		L		T	W		L		T
American	7	–	1	–	1	11	–	5	–	5
Loyola Maryland	6	–	1	–	2	8	–	7	–	3
Colgate ‡	5	–	3	–	1	13	–	7	–	2
Boston U.	4	–	3	–	2	9	–	6	–	3
Army	4	–	4	–	1	9	–	8	–	2
Bucknell	4	–	4	–	1	7	–	11	–	3
Lafayette	3	–	5	–	1	7	–	9	–	2
Lehigh	3	–	6	–	0	7	–	10	–	1
Holy Cross	1	–	5	–	3	5	–	10	–	3
Navy	1	–	6	–	2	5	–	9	–	4
‡-Tournament Champion +-Invited to the NCAA Division I Men's Soccer Championship; As of 18 November 2016; Rankings from NSCAA

The 2016 Patriot League men's soccer season was the 24th season of men's varsity soccer in the conference.

The Colgate Raiders and Lehigh Mountain Hawks are the defending regular season and tournament champions, respectively.

== Changes from 2015 ==
- None

== Teams ==
=== Stadia and locations ===
Team	Location	Stadium	Capacity
American Eagles	Washington, D.C.	Reeves Field	1,000
Army Black Knights	West Point, New York	Clinton Field	1,000
Boston University Terriers	Boston, Massachusetts	Nickerson Field	10,412
Bucknell Bison	Lewisburg, Pennsylvania	Emmitt Field at Holmes Stadium	1,200
Colgate Raiders	Hamilton, New York	Van Doren Field	2,000
Holy Cross Crusaders	Worcester, Massachusetts	Linda Johnson Smith Soccer Stadium	1,320
Lafayette Leopards	Easton, Pennsylvania	Oaks Stadium	1,000
Lehigh Mountain Hawks	Bethlehem, Pennsylvania	Ulrich Sports Complex	4,000
Loyola Greyhounds	Baltimore, Maryland	Ridley Athletic Complex	6,000
Navy Midshipmen	Annapolis, Maryland	Glenn Warner Soccer Facility	1,600

== Regular season ==
=== Rankings ===
Legend
Increase in ranking
Decrease in ranking
Not ranked previous week

		Pre	Wk 1	Wk 2	Wk 3	Wk 4	Wk 5	Wk 6	Wk 7	Wk 8	Wk 9	Wk 10	Wk 11	Wk 12	Final
American	C	RV	RV	20	RV	RV	NR			RV	25	NR			
Army	C														
Boston University	C														
Bucknell	C														
Colgate	C		RV	NR	RV	RV	NR								
Holy Cross	C														
Lafayette	C														
Lehigh	C														
Loyola	C														
Navy	C														

=== Results ===
Team/opponent	AME	ARM	BU	BCK	COL	HC	LAF	LEH	LOY	NVY
American Eagles										
Army Black Knights										
Boston University Terriers										
Bucknell Bison										
Colgate Raiders										
Holy Cross Crusaders										
Lafayette Leopards										
Lehigh Mountain Hawks										
Loyola Greyhounds										
Navy Midshipmen										

== Postseason ==
=== Patriot League Tournament ===
Tournament details to be announced.

=== NCAA tournament ===
Seed	Region	School	1st round	2nd round	3rd round	Quarterfinals	Semifinals	Championship
—	2	Colgate	L, 2–4 vs. UCLA – (Los Angeles)					

== All-Patriot League awards and teams ==
2016 Patriot League Men's Soccer Individual Awards
Award	Recipient(s)
Offensive Player of the Year	Panos Nakhid, American, Sr.,
Midfielder of the Year	Dale Ludwig, American, Sr.
Defensive Player of the Year	Zach Tamen, Colgate, Sr.
Goalkeeper of the Year	Matt Sanchez, Loyola Maryland, Sr.
Rookie of the Year	Brian Saramago, Loyola Maryland, Fr.
Coach of the Year	Steve Nichols, Loyola Maryland

2016 Patriot League Men's Soccer All-Conference Teams
First Team	Second Team	Rookie Team
Ethan Kutler, Colgate, Sr., F Brian Saramago, Loyola Maryland, Fr., F Dale Ludwig, American, Sr., M Panos Nakhid, American, Sr., M Anthony Viteri, Boston University, Jr., M Jared Stroud, Colgate, Jr., M Michael Cherry, American, Sr., D Zach McGraw, Army West Point, Fr., D Zack Rockmore, Bucknell, Sr., D Zach Tamen, Colgate, Sr., D Matt Sanchez, Loyola Maryland, Sr., GK	Felix De Bona, Boston University, Sr., F Sebastiaan Blickman, Bucknell, Sr., F Colin O’Neill, Colgate, Sr., M Gabriel Carlsson, Loyola Maryland, So., M Barry Sharifi, Loyola Maryland, Fr., M Brock Dudley, Navy, Jr., M Jake Garcia, American, Sr., D David Asbjornsson, Boston University, Sr., D Christian Moyse, Lafayette, Jr., D Ryan Tuck, Loyola Maryland, Sr., D Matt Gilbert, Boston University, Sr., GK	Rex Epps, Army West Point, Fr., F Sam Bascom, Navy, Sr., F Ryan Egan, Lafayette, Sr., M Nick King, Bucknell, Fr., M Marcos Arroyo, Army West Point, Jr., M Yuji Callahan, Holy Cross, Jr., M Christian Clark, Army West Point, Sr., D Tanner Vosvick, Army West Point, Sr., D Aram Ouligian, Colgate, So., D Justin Worley, Lehigh, Sr., D Lucas Belanger, American, Sr., GK

== See also ==
- 2016 NCAA Division I men's soccer season
- 2016 Patriot League Men's Soccer Tournament
- 2016 Patriot League women's soccer season
