= Patriot League men's soccer tournament =

- Sport: College soccer
- Conference: Patriot League
- Number of teams: 10 (league); 6 (tournament)
- Format: Single-elimination
- Played: 1990–present
- Last contest: 2026
- Current champion: Lehigh (4th title)
- Most championships: Colgate; Lafayette (8 titles each)
- Official website: patriotleague.org/msoc

The Patriot League men's soccer tournament is the conference championship tournament in college soccer for the Patriot League. The tournament has been held every year since 1990. It is a single-elimination tournament with seeding based on conference records and the regular-season champion hosting the semifinal and final matches. The field expanded from four to six teams when the league increased membership from eight to ten universities in 2013. The winner, declared conference champion, receives the conference's automatic bid to the NCAA Division I men's soccer championship.

Colgate and Lafayette have won the most conference titles with 8 each.

== Champions ==
=== Finals ===
Key

- (1) – Title number
- a.e.t. – Match went to extra time
- p – Match decided by a penalty shootout after extra time
- – Winning team won regular season

Ed.	Year	Champion	Score	Runner-up	Venue	City	MVP
1	1990	Fordham (1)	1–0 (a.e.t.)	Lafayette	Memorial Stadium	Lewisburg, PA	(United States) Chris Donovan, Fordham
2	1991	Army (1)	4–0	Lehigh	Dewey Field	Annapolis, MD	(United States) Phillip Shearer, Army
3	1992	Colgate (1)	1–0 (a.e.t.)	Army	Clinton Field	Annapolis, MD	(United States) Brian Wycall, Colgate
4	1993	Army (2)	4–2 (a.e.t.)	Bucknell	Metzgar Field	Easton, PA	(United States) Tony Dedmond, Army
5	1994	Lafayette (1)	1–0	Army	Metzgar Field	Easton, PA	(Scotland) Geddes Alexander, Lafayette
6	1995	Lafayette (2)	3–2 (a.e.t.)	Navy	Fitton Field	Worcester, MA	(United States) Eric Rosenbloom, Lafayette
7	1996	Army (3)	4–1	Navy	Colgate Varsity Field	Hamilton, NY	(United States) A.J. Florkowski, Army
8	1997	Colgate (2)	1–0	Lehigh	Colgate Varsity Field	Hamilton, NY	(United States) Jeff Lipman, Colgate
9	1998	Lafayette (3)	2–0	Lehigh	Metzgar Field	Easton, PA	(United States) Leidy Klotz, Lafayette
10	1999	Lafayette (4)	1–0 (a.e.t.)	Navy	Fitton Field	Worcester, MA	(United States) Craig Schroeder, Lafayette
11	2000	Lehigh (1)	1–1 (5–3 p)	Lafayette	Metzgar Field	Easton, PA	(United States) Dan Perciballi, Lehigh
12	2001	American (1)	1–1 (4–3 p)	Holy Cross	Hart Field	Worcester, MA	(United States) Bobby Brennan, American
13	2002	Holy Cross (1)	0–0 (10–9 p)	Lehigh	Nickerson Field	Boston, MA	(Italy) Rusty Giudici, Holy Cross
14	2003	Lafayette (5)	2–0	Lehigh	Bucknell East Field	Lewisburg, PA	(United States) Ralph Rapuano, Lafayette
15	2004	American (2)	1–0 (a.e.t.)	Lehigh	Reeves Field	Washington, DC	(United States) Garth Juckem, American
16	2005	Lafayette (6)	1–0	American	Reeves Field	Washington, DC	(United States) Michael Tortora, Lafayette
17	2006	Bucknell (1)	0–0 (4–3 p)	Lafayette	Ulrich Sports Complex	Bethlehem, PA	(United States) Joey Kuterbach, Bucknell
18	2007	Colgate (3)	1–0	Lafayette	Linda Smith Stadium	Worcester, MA	(United States) Dan Belke, Colgate
19	2008	Colgate (4)	2–1	Holy Cross	Colgate Varsity Field	Hamilton, NY	(United States) Alex Weeks, Colgate
20	2009	Bucknell (2)	1–0	American	Emmitt Field	Lewisburg, PA	(United States) Patrick Selwood, Bucknell
21	2010	Bucknell (3)	2–0	American	Van Doren Field	Hamilton, NY	(United States) Ross Liberati, Bucknell
22	2011	Colgate (5)	2–0	American	Reeves Field	Washington, DC	(United States) Steven Miller, Colgate
23	2012	Lafayette (7)	2–0	American	Reeves Field	Washington, DC	(United States) Nathan McDonald, Lafayette
24	2013	Navy (1)	2–0	Holy Cross	Glenn Warner Facility	Annapolis, MD	(United States) Guy Skord, Navy
25	2014	Bucknell (4)	3–2 (a.e.t.)	Boston U	Nickerson Field	Boston, MA	(United States) Sebastiaan Blickman, Bucknell
26	2015	Lehigh (2)	2–1	American	Beyer-Small '76 Field	Hamilton, NY	(United States) Jamie Luchini, Lehigh
27	2016	Colgate (6)	0–0 (5–4 p)	American	Reeves Field	Washington, DC	(United States) Ethan Kutler, Colgate
28	2017	Colgate (7)	1–0	Holy Cross	Ridley Athletic Complex	Baltimore, MD	(United States) Jared Stroud, Colgate
29	2018	Colgate (8)	1–0	Army	Ridley Athletic Complex	Baltimore, MD	(United States) Oliver Harris, Colgate
30	2019	Lehigh (3)	1–0	Lafayette	Ulrich Sports Complex	Bethlehem, PA	(United States) Will Smith, Lehigh
31	2020	American (3)	2–1	Lafayette	Oaks Stadium	Easton, PA	(Senegal) David Coly, American
32	2021	Loyola (1)	2–1	American	Ridley Athletic Complex	Baltimore, MD	(United States) Chase Vosvick, Loyola
33	2022	Navy (2)	1–0	American	Warren Soccer Facility	Annapolis, MD	(United States) Zach Wagner, Navy
34	2023	Boston U (1)	1–0	Lafayette	Nickerson Field	Boston, MA	(Canada) Eitan Rosen, Boston U
35	2024	Bucknell (5)	3–0	Colgate	Emmitt Field	Lewisburg, PA	(United States) Aidan Lawlor, Bucknell
36	2025	Lafayette (8)	1–1 (4–1 p)	Lehigh	Ulrich Sports Complex	Bethlehem, PA	(United States) Eric Axtman, Lafayette
37	2026	Lehigh (4)	2–1	Bucknell	Emmitt Field	Lewisburg, PA	(United States) Trey Sheeler, Lehigh

== Performance by school ==
=== Most championships ===
School	Titles	Winning years
Colgate	8	1992, 1997, 2007, 2008, 2011, 2016, 2017, 2018
Lafayette	8	1994, 1995, 1998, 1999, 2003, 2005, 2012, 2025
Bucknell	5	2006, 2009, 2010, 2014, 2024
Lehigh	4	2000, 2015, 2019, 2026
Army	3	1991, 1993, 1995
American	3	2001, 2004, 2020
Navy	2	2013, 2022
Boston University	1	2023
Holy Cross	1	2002
Loyola	1	2021
Fordham	1	1990
Total (all schools)	37	

Notes

- Italics indicate a school that is no longer a conference member
