= 2017 Patriot League men's soccer tournament =

- Classification: Division I
- Teams: 6
- Matches: 5
- Site: Ridley Athletic Complex; Baltimore, Maryland
- Champions: Colgate (7th title)
- Winning coach: Erik Ronning (5th title)
- Broadcast: PLN

2017 Patriot League men's soccer standings
	Conf.					Overall
Team	W		L		T	W		L		T
Loyola Maryland	7	–	2	–	0	11	–	6	–	1
Boston U.	6	–	2	–	1	7	–	8	–	4
Lehigh	5	–	3	–	1	11	–	7	–	1
Bucknell	5	–	3	–	1	7	–	8	–	4
Holy Cross	4	–	3	–	2	7	–	9	–	4
No. 21 Colgate ‡	4	–	4	–	1	12	–	11	–	1
Army	3	–	4	–	2	9	–	6	–	2
American	3	–	6	–	0	4	–	12	–	1
Lafayette	3	–	6	–	0	4	–	14	–	0
Navy	0	–	7	–	2	2	–	13	–	2
‡-Tournament Champion +-Invited to the NCAA Division I Men's Soccer Championship; As of December 13, 2017; Rankings from United Soccer Coaches

The 2017 Patriot League men's soccer tournament, was the 28th edition of the tournament. It determined the Patriot League's automatic berth into the 2017 NCAA Division I Men's Soccer Championship.

The tournament was won by Colgate, who qualified for the tournament on the last day of the regular season as the sixth and final seed in the tournament. Colgate were also the defending champions, and were able to capture their seventh Patriot League Tournament championship, tying them with Lafayette. En route to the final, Colgate upset third-seed Bucknell and top seed Loyola. In the final, a 67th minute striker from Oliver Harris sealed the title for the Raiders against Holy Cross.

With the championship, Colgate earned an automatic berth into the 2017 NCAA Tournament. There they made a run to the Sweet Sixteen, upsetting No. 24 UMass and No. 13 Michigan along the way. Colgate ultimately fell to Louisville.

== Seeding ==
The top six programs qualified for the Patriot League Tournament.

== Bracket ==
First round November 7
3	Bucknell	0
6	Colgate	1
4	Lehigh	0
5	Holy Cross	3

Semifinals; November 10
1	Loyola (MD)	2
6	Colgate (OT)	3
2	Boston U	0 (1)
5	Holy Cross (pen.)	0 (4)

Championship; November 12
6	Colgate	1
5	Holy Cross	0

== Results ==
=== First round ===
November 7
7:05 PM EST

^{No. 4} Lehigh Mountain Hawks	0–3	^{No. 5} Holy Cross Crusaders
	Report	Rupp 3'; Cestaro 12'; Ross 13'

Ulrich Sports Complex, Bethlehem, Pennsylvania
Attendance: 158
Referee: Mike DeFelice

November 7
7:05 PM EST

^{No. 3} Bucknell Bison	0–1	^{No. 6} Colgate Raiders
	Report	Morrison 71'

Holmes Stadium, Lewisburg, Pennsylvania
Attendance: 300
Referee: Shaun Papperman

=== Semifinals ===
November 10
5:00 PM EST

^{No. 1} Loyola Greyhounds	2–3 (a.e.t.)	^{No. 6} Colgate Raiders
Watson 6'; Fawole 62'	Report	DeLeo 70' 98'; Clarke 87'

Ridley Athletic Complex, Baltimore, Maryland
Attendance: 656
Referee: Mark Gorak

November 10
8:00 PM EST

^{No. 2} Boston University Terriers	0–0 (a.e.t.)	^{No. 5} Holy Cross Crusaders
Penalties
Cortet (penalty missed); McDonnell (penalty missed); Lampis (penalty scored)	1–4	(penalty scored) Carfora; (penalty scored) Ross; (penalty scored) Krause; (penalty scored) Rupp

Ridley Athletic Complex, Baltimore, Maryland
Attendance: 656
Referee: Karl Kummer

=== Final ===
November 12
3:00 PM EST

^{No. 5} Holy Cross Crusaders	0–1	^{No. 6} Colgate Raiders
	Report	Harris 67'

Ridley Athletic Complex, Baltimore, Maryland
Attendance: 237
Referee: John McCloskey

== Awards ==
**Patriot League Men's Soccer All-Tournament team**

**Jared Stroud, Colgate Sr., M**
Steven DeLeo, Colgate, Jr., F
Oliver Harris, Colgate, Jr., M
Aram Ouligian, Colgate, Jr., D
Yuji Callahan, Holy Cross, Sr., F/M
Brad Ross, Holy Cross, Sr., D
Henry Stutz, Holy Cross, Jr., GK
Gabriel Carlsson, Loyola Maryland, Jr., M
Josh Fawole, Loyola Maryland So., F
Satchel Cortet, Boston University, So., M
Adam Sheikali, Boston University, Sr., D

MVP's in Bold
