= 2024 Patriot League men's soccer tournament =

- Classification: Division I
- Teams: 6
- Matches: 5
- Attendance: 2,799
- Site: Campus Sites, Higher seed
- Champions: Bucknell (5th title)
- Winning coach: Dave Brandt (2nd title)
- MVP: Aidan Lawlor (Bucknell)
- Broadcast: ESPN+

2024 Patriot League men's soccer standings
	Conf.					Overall
Team	W		L		T	W		L		T
Boston U	4	–	1	–	4	4	–	4	–	10
Bucknell ‡	4	–	1	–	4	7	–	7	–	6
American	4	–	2	–	3	5	–	5	–	9
Colgate	4	–	3	–	2	8	–	9	–	3
Lehigh	4	–	4	–	1	6	–	10	–	3
Loyola (MD)	3	–	3	–	3	4	–	7	–	6
Holy Cross	3	–	3	–	3	4	–	9	–	5
Lafayette	3	–	4	–	2	8	–	6	–	4
Navy	3	–	5	–	1	4	–	8	–	4
Army	1	–	7	–	1	4	–	11	–	2
‡ – 2024 Patriot League tournament champion + – At-large invitation to the 2024 NCAA tournament; As of December 17, 2024; Rankings from United Soccer Coaches; Source: Patriot League

The 2024 Patriot League men's soccer tournament was the postseason men's soccer tournament for the Patriot League held from November 9 through November 16, 2024. The tournament was held at campus sites, with the higher seeded team hosting. The six-team single-elimination tournament consisted of three rounds based on seeding from regular season conference play. The defending champions were the Boston University Terriers. They were unable to defend their crown, as they were eliminated by Colgate in a penalty shoot-out the Semifinals. The second seeded Bucknell Bison would go on to claim the title, defeating Colgate in the final, 3–0. The conference championship was the fifth for the Bucknell men's soccer program, and the second for head coach Dave Brandt. It is the first title for Brandt at Bucknell. He won the 2013 title while head coach of Navy. As tournament champions, Bucknell earned the Patriot League's automatic berth into the 2024 NCAA Division I men's soccer tournament.

== Seeding ==
Six of the ten Patriot League men's soccer programs qualified for the 2024 Tournament. Teams were seeded based on their regular season records. Tiebreakers were used to determine the seedings of teams who finished with identical conference records. A tiebreaker was required to determine the first and second seeds in the tournament as Boston University and Bucknell both finished with identical 4–1–4 regular season records. Boston University earned the top seed by virtue of their 1–0 defeat of Bucknell on October 12, during the regular season. Another tiebreaker was required for the sixth and final seed in the tournament as Holy Cross and Loyola Maryland both finished with 3–3–3 regular season records. Loyola Maryland earned the final spot in the tournament by virtue of their 2–1 regular season win over Holy Cross on September 29.

Seed	School	Conference Record	Points
1	Boston University	4–1–4	16
2	Bucknell	4–1–4	16
3	American	4–2–3	15
4	Colgate	4–3–2	14
5	Lehigh	4–4–1	13
6	Loyola Maryland	3–3–3	12

== Bracket ==
Quarterfinals; Saturday, Nov. 9
4	Colgate (a.e.t)	2
5	Lehigh	1
3	American (pen.)	2 (5)
6	Loyola Maryland	2 (4)

Semifinals; Tuesday, Nov. 12
1	Boston University	0
4	Colgate	1
2	Bucknell (pen.)	1 (6)
3	American	1 (5)

Final; Sunday, Nov. 16
4	Colgate	0
2	Bucknell	3

== Schedule ==
=== Quarterfinals ===
November 9, 2024	#4 Colgate	2–1 (a.e.t.)	#5 Lehigh	Hamilton, NY
6:00 p.m. EST	Aidan Wright (yellow card) 13'; Mason Pahule (yellow card) 25'; Timmy Donovan 84'; Wade Johnson (yellow card) 89'; Blake Pipkin 108'	Report	(yellow card) 40' Bora Turker; 65' Yusef Gueye; (yellow card) 71' Shea Coughlin; (yellow card) 98' Sam Davis	Stadium: Beyer-Small '76 Field; Attendance: 371; Referee: Philip Benson; Assistant referees: William Albro; Jeffrey Cook; Fourth official: Micheal Quirk

November 9, 2024	#3 American	2–2 (a.e.t.) (5–4 p)	#6 Loyola Maryland	Montgomery, MD
6:00 p.m. EST	Dilane Zouantcha (yellow card) 45'; Taku Takahashi 62'; Samuel Hershey 66'; Cooper Nunn (yellow card) 73'; Leo Palomo (yellow card) 99'	Report	(yellow card) 39' Pat Kakayira; (yellow card) 45' Oscar Halls; 56' Jake Sweeney; 73' Richie Nichols; (yellow card) 74' Chris Ogor	Stadium: Montgomery College; Attendance: 220; Referee: Andrea Pileri; Assistant referees: Alexander Tyshkevych; Alexander Luttman; Fourth official: Ryan Nee
	Penalties
	Samuel Hershey (penalty scored); Ethan Boyle (penalty scored); Troy Elgersma (penalty scored); Leo Palomo (penalty scored); Cooper Nunn (penalty scored)		(penalty scored) Sean McEvoy; (penalty scored) Jordy Luchies; (penalty scored) Oscar Halls; (penalty scored) Juston Rainey; (penalty missed) Richie Nichols

=== Semifinals ===
November 12, 2024	#2 Bucknell	1–1 (a.e.t.) (6–5 p)	#3 American	Lewisburg, PA
6:00 p.m. EST	Jack Lucas 18' (pen.); Cohen Weaver (yellow card) 60'; Ben Sheffield (yellow card) 71'; Collin Sullivan (yellow card) 74'	Report	69' Samuel Hershey; (yellow card) 108' Leo Palomo	Stadium: Emmitt Field; Attendance: 426; Referee: Philip Benson; Assistant referees: Tim Deljanovan; Max Campbell; Fourth official: Robert Sheker
	Penalties
	Drew Roskos (penalty scored); Freddie Lapworth (penalty scored); Jack Lucas (penalty scored); Jackson Sullivan (penalty missed); Zane Domsohn (penalty scored); Kiko Hidalgo (penalty scored); Ben Sheffield (penalty scored)		(penalty scored) Samuel Hershey; (penalty scored) Ethan Boyle; (penalty scored) Troy Elgersma; (penalty missed) Leo Palomo; (penalty scored) Cooper Nunn; (penalty scored) Reyes Parra; (penalty missed) Taku Takahashi

November 12, 2024	#1 Boston University	0–1	#4 Colgate	Boston, MA
7:00 p.m. EST		Report	27' Timmy Donovan; (yellow card) 70' Cason Stafford	Stadium: Nickerson Field; Attendance: 346; Referee: Carlos Fernandez; Assistant referees: Jonathan Luk; Sandro Araujo; Fourth official: Matt Stein

=== Final ===
November 16, 2024	#2 Bucknell	3–0	#4 Colgate	Lewisburg, PA
6:00 p.m. EST	11' Waldemar Kattrup; 61' Drew Roskos; (yellow card) 76' Ben Sheffield; 77' Nick Prime	Report		Stadium: Emmitt Field; Attendance: 1,436; Referee: Andrea Pileri; Assistant referees: Daniel Wahila; Justin Geho; Fourth official: Eric Samples

== Statistics ==
=== Goalscorers ===
There have been 13 goals scored in 5 matches, for an average of 2.6 goals per match (as of November 16, 2024).

2 goals

- Timmy Donovan – Colgate
- Samuel Hershey – American

1 goal

- Yusef Gueye – Lehigh
- Waldemar Kattrup – Bucknell
- Jack Lucas – Bucknell
- Richie Nichols – Loyola Maryland
- Blake Pipkin – Colgate
- Nick Prime – Bucknell
- Drew Roskos – Bucknell
- Jake Sweeney – Loyola Maryland
- Taku Takahashi – American

== All-Tournament team ==
Player	Team
Troy Elgersma	American
Sam Hershey	American
Ryan Lau	Boston University
John Roman	Boston University
David Krumov	Bucknell
Freddie Lapworth	Bucknell
**Aidan Lawlor**	Bucknell
Drew Roskos	Bucknell
Jacob Blackwin	Colgate
Timmy Donovan	Colgate
Mason Pahule	Colgate

MVP in bold
