= 2019 Patriot League men's soccer tournament =

- Classification: Division I
- Teams: 6
- Matches: 5
- Site: Ulrich Stadium; Bethlehem, Pennsylvania
- Champions: Lehigh (3rd title)
- Winning coach: Dean Koski (3rd title)
- MVP: Will Smith (Lehigh)
- Broadcast: ESPN3

2019 Patriot League men's soccer standings
	Conf.					Overall
Team	W		L		T	W		L		T
Lehigh ‡	6	–	0	–	3	13	–	5	–	3
Loyola (MD)	7	–	2	–	0	10	–	8	–	1
Navy	5	–	3	–	1	11	–	4	–	1
Lafayette	4	–	3	–	2	10	–	7	–	3
Colgate	4	–	4	–	1	6	–	9	–	4
Bucknell	2	–	2	–	5	6	–	7	–	7
American	3	–	5	–	1	3	–	11	–	2
Boston U	3	–	6	–	0	4	–	12	–	1
Army	2	–	4	–	3	5	–	7	–	4
Holy Cross	1	–	8	–	0	3	–	15	–	0
‡ – 2019 Patriot Tournament Champion + – Invited to the 2019 NCAA tournament; As of 22 November 2019; Rankings from United Soccer Coaches

The 2019 Patriot League men's soccer tournament was the 30th edition of the Patriot League Men's Soccer Tournament. The tournament decided the Patriot League champion as well as the conference's automatic berth into the 2019 NCAA Division I men's soccer tournament. The tournament began on November 9 and concluded on November 16, 2019.

The defending champions, Colgate, were eliminated in the first round by eventual runners-up, Lafayette. Lehigh won the championship, 1–0, over Lafayette to claim their third Patriot League Tournament championship. There, Lehigh earned the conference's automatic bit in the NCAA Tournament. There, they were eliminated by Pittsburgh in the opening round.

== Seeds ==
Seed	School	Conference	Pts.	Tiebreaker
1	Lehigh	6–0–3	21	Lehigh 1–0 vs. Loyola (MD)
2	Loyola (MD)	7–2–0	21	Loyola (MD) 0–1 vs. Lehigh
3	Navy	5–3–1	16	
4	Lafayette	4–3–2	14	
5	Colgate	4–4–1	13	
6	Bucknell	2–2–5	11	

== Bracket ==
First round November 9
3	Navy	0
6	Bucknell	2
4	Lafayette	2
5	Colgate	1

Semifinals; November 12
1	Lehigh	1
6	Bucknell	0
2	Loyola (MD)	0 (4)
4	Lafayette (pen.)	0 (5)

Championship; November 16
1	Lehigh	1
4	Lafayette	0

== Results ==
=== First round ===
November 9
1:05 p.m. EDT

No. 3 Navy	0–2	No. 6 Bucknell
	Report	Thorsheim 26', 59'

Glenn Warner Stadium, Annapolis
Attendance: 429
Referee: J. C. Griggs

November 9
3:05 p.m. EDT

No. 4 Lafayette	2–1	No. 5 Colgate
Kitromilides 8'; Gonçalves 58'	Report	Clarke 32'

Oaks Stadium, Easton
Attendance: 450
Referee: Peter Dhime

=== Semifinals ===
November 12
6:00 p.m. EDT

No. 1 Lehigh	1–0	No. 6 Bucknell
Koski 76'	Report

Ulrich Stadium, Bethlehem
Attendance: 291
Referee: David Breckner

November 12
7:00 p.m. EDT

No. 2 Loyola (MD)	0–0 (a.e.t.)	No. 4 Lafayette
	Report
Penalties
Sharifi (penalty missed); Fawole (penalty scored); Ingram (penalty scored); Saramago (penalty scored); Lussi (penalty scored); Mason (penalty missed)	4–5	(penalty scored) Gonçalves; (penalty scored) Varela; (penalty scored) Kitromilides; (penalty scored) Williams; (penalty missed) Panayides; (penalty scored) Ssessanga

Ridley Athletic Complex, Baltimore
Attendance: 324
Referee: Sergio Gonzalez

=== Final ===
November 16
7:00 p.m. EDT

No. 1 Lehigh	1–0	No. 4 Lafayette
Tahiru 54'	Report

Ulrich Stadium, Bethlehem
Attendance: 1,705
Referee: Mike DeFelice

== Patriot League Tournament Best XI ==
Player	Team
**Patriot League Men's Soccer All-Tournament team**
**Will Smith**	Lehigh
Trevor Koski	Lehigh
Stevo Bednarsky	Lehigh
Michael Tahiru	Lehigh
Alex Sutton	Lafayette
Christian Williams	Lafayette
Ryan Gonçalves	Lafayette
Daniel Osuji	Loyola (MD)
Davey Mason	Loyola (MD)
Matt Thorsheim	Bucknell
Luke Smith	Bucknell

MVP in Bold
