= 2023 Patriot League men's soccer tournament =

- Classification: Division I
- Teams: 6
- Matches: 5
- Attendance: 2,344
- Site: Campus Sites, Higher seed
- Champions: Boston University (1st title)
- Winning coach: Kevin Nylen (1st title)
- MVP: Eitan Rosen (Boston University)
- Broadcast: ESPN+

2023 Patriot League men's soccer standings
	Conf.					Overall
Team	W		L		T	W		L		T
Boston University ‡	7	–	1	–	1	12	–	4	–	4
Loyola (MD)	6	–	1	–	2	7	–	3	–	8
Lafayette	4	–	2	–	3	9	–	6	–	6
Colgate	4	–	3	–	2	8	–	10	–	2
Navy	3	–	2	–	4	6	–	8	–	5
American	3	–	3	–	3	6	–	5	–	5
Holy Cross	2	–	5	–	2	5	–	10	–	3
Lehigh	2	–	5	–	2	3	–	10	–	5
Army	1	–	5	–	3	3	–	9	–	4
Bucknell	1	–	6	–	2	2	–	10	–	4
‡ – 2023 Patriot Tournament Champion + – At-large invitation to the 2023 NCAA tournament; As of December 12, 2023; Rankings from United Soccer Coaches; Source: Patriot League

The 2023 Patriot League men's soccer tournament was the postseason men's soccer tournament for the Patriot League held from November 4 through November 11, 2023. The tournament was held at campus sites, with the higher seeded team hosting. The six-team single-elimination tournament consisted of three rounds based on seeding from regular season conference play. The defending champions were the Navy Midshipmen. They were unable to defend their crown, as they lost to Colgate in the Quarterfinals. The top seeded Boston University Terriers would go on to claim the title, defeating Lafayette in the final, 1–0. The conference championship was the first for the Boston University men's soccer program, and the first for head coach Kevin Nylen. As tournament champions, Boston University earned the Patriot League's automatic berth into the 2023 NCAA Division I men's soccer tournament.

== Seeding ==
Six of the ten Patriot League men's soccer programs qualified for the 2023 Tournament. Teams were seeded based on their regular season records. Tiebreakers were used to determine the seedings of teams who finished with identical conference records. No tiebreakers were required as all teams finished with unique regular season conference records.

Seed	School	Conference Record	Points
1	Boston University	7–1–1	22
2	Loyola (MD)	6–1–2	20
3	Lafayette	4–2–3	15
4	Colgate	4–3–2	14
5	Navy	3–2–4	13
6	American	3–3–3	12

== Bracket ==
Quarterfinals; Saturday, Nov. 4
4	Colgate	2
5	Navy	0
3	Lafayette (pen.)	2 (3)
6	American	2 (1)

Semifinals; Tuesday, Nov. 7
1	Boston University	2
4	Colgate	0
2	Loyola (MD)	0
3	Lafayette (a.e.t.)	2

Final; Sunday, Nov. 11
1	Boston University	1
3	Lafayette	0

== Schedule ==
=== Quarterfinals ===
November 4	#4 Colgate	2–0	#5 Navy	Hamilton, NY
5:00 p.m. ET	Aidan Davock 14', 90', (yellow card) 81'; Mason Pahule (yellow card) 88'	Report	(yellow card) 85' Zach Wagner; (yellow card) 89' Andrew Schug	Stadium: Beyer-Small '76 Field; Attendance: 427; Referee: Tyler McElhinney; Assistant referees: Daniel Wahila; Christopher Crocker; Fourth official: Yale Wall

November 4	#3 Lafayette	2–2 (a.e.t.) (3–1 p)	#6 American	Easton, PA
6:00 p.m. ET	Carter Houlihan 51'; Hale Lombard (yellow card) 53'; Connor Dawson (yellow card) 73'; Roy Bigeon 75'; David Mizrahi (yellow card) 105'	Report	29' Nevin Baer; (yellow card) 42' Leo Palomo; (yellow card) 46' (yellow-red card) 53' Evan Schweickert; (yellow card) 59', (goal) 60' Robert Matei	Stadium: Oaks Stadium; Attendance: 299
	Penalties
	Connor Dawson (penalty scored); David Mizrahi (penalty missed); Hale Lombard (penalty scored); Beaux Lizewski (penalty missed); Lawrence Aydlett (penalty scored)		(penalty missed) Robert Matei; (penalty missed) Taku Takahashi; (penalty scored) Samuel Hershey; (penalty missed) Tim Schliemann

=== Semifinals ===
November 7	#1 Boston University	2–0	#4 Colgate	Boston, MA
6:00 p.m. ET	Kevin Torres (yellow card) 65'; Colin Innes 82', 86'; Griffin Roach (yellow card) 89'	Report	(yellow card) 69' Timmy Donovan; (yellow card) 89' Dale Lepper	Stadium: Nickerson Field; Attendance: 352; Referee: Victor Borges; Assistant referees: Colby Johnson; Danny Marques; Fourth official: Matt Stein

November 7	#2 Loyola (MD)	0–2 (a.e.t.)	#3 Lafayette	Baltimore. MD
6:00 p.m. ET	Chris Ogor (yellow card) 42'; Milan Miric (yellow card) 110'	Report	(yellow card) 86' Team; 107' Roy Biegon; (yellow card) 109', (goal) 109' Hale Lombard; (yellow card) 109' Lawrence Aydlett	Stadium: Ridley Athletic Complex; Attendance: 458

=== Final ===
November 11	#1 Boston University	1–0	#3 Lafayette	Boston, MA
1:00 p.m. ET	Eitan Rosen 65', (yellow card) 65'	Report	(yellow card) 36' Digger Iqbal; (yellow card) 64' Beaux Lizewski; (yellow card) 65' Hale Lombard; (yellow card) 73' Connor Dawson; (red card) 90' Lawrence Aydlett	Stadium: Nickerson Field; Attendance: 808; Referee: Tyler McElhinney; Assistant referees: Samuel Conroy; William Ferris; Fourth official: Matt Stein

== Statistics ==
=== Goalscorers ===
There have been 11 goals scored in 5 matches, for an average of 2.2 goals per match (as of November 11, 2023).

2 goals

- Colin Innes – Boston University
- Aidan Davock – Colgate
- Roy Bigeon – Lafayette

1 goal

- Nevin Baer – American
- Robert Matei – American
- Eitan Rosen – Boston University
- Carter Houlihan – Lafayette
- Hale Lombard – Lafayette

== All-Tournament team ==
Player	Team
Colin Innes	Boston University
Francesco Montali	Boston University
Griffin Roach	Boston University
**Eitan Rosen**	Boston University
Aidan Davock	Colgate
Mason Pahule	Colgate
Lawrence Aydlett	Lafayette
Roy Biegon	Lafayette
Hale Lombard	Lafayette
Chris Ogor	Loyola (MD)
Dylan Van der Walt	Loyola (MD)

MVP in bold
