= 2018 Patriot League men's soccer tournament =

- Classification: Division I
- Teams: 6
- Matches: 5
- Attendance: 1,181
- Site: Ridley Athletic Complex; Baltimore, Maryland
- Champions: Colgate (8th title)
- Winning coach: Erik Ronning (6th title)
- MVP: Oliver Harris (Colgate)
- Broadcast: PLN

2018 Patriot League men's soccer standings
	Conf.					Overall
Team	W		L		T	W		L		T
Loyola Maryland	7	–	1	–	1	12	–	4	–	1
Lehigh	6	–	3	–	0	9	–	8	–	2
Colgate ‡	5	–	2	–	2	13	–	5	–	5
Boston U.	4	–	4	–	1	5	–	10	–	4
American	3	–	3	–	3	4	–	9	–	5
Army	4	–	5	–	0	8	–	10	–	2
Navy	4	–	5	–	0	5	–	11	–	1
Bucknell	3	–	5	–	1	6	–	8	–	3
Holy Cross	2	–	6	–	1	3	–	10	–	4
Lafayette	1	–	5	–	3	5	–	8	–	4
‡-Tournament Champion +-Invited to the NCAA Division I Men's Soccer Championship; As of November 30, 2018; Rankings from United Soccer Coaches

The 2018 Patriot League men's soccer tournament, will be the 29th edition of the tournament. It determined the Patriot League's automatic berth into the 2018 NCAA Division I Men's Soccer Championship.

The Colgate Raiders are the two-time defending champions, and successfully defended their title defeating Army 1–0 in the final.

== Background ==
The 2017 tournament was won by Colgate Raiders, who qualified for the tournament on the last day of the regular season as the sixth and final seed in the tournament. Colgate were able to capture their seventh Patriot League Tournament championship, tying them with Lafayette. En-route to the final, Colgate upset third-seed Bucknell and top seed Loyola. In the final, a 67th minute striker from Oliver Harris sealed the title for the Raiders against Holy Cross.

With the championship, Colgate earned an automatic berth into the 2017 NCAA Tournament. There they made a run to the Sweet Sixteen, upsetting No. 24 UMass and No. 13 Michigan along the way. Colgate ultimately fell to Louisville.

== Seeds ==
Seed	School	Conference	Pts.	Tiebreaker
1	Loyola Maryland	7–1–1	22	
2	Lehigh	6–3–0	18	
3	Colgate	5–2–2	17	
4	Boston University	4–4–1	13	
5	Army	4–5–0	12	Army 1–0 vs. American
6	American	3–3–3	12	American 0–1 vs. Army

== Bracket ==
Quarterfinals; November 6
3	Colgate (OT)	3
6	American	2
4	Boston U	0 (4)
5	Army (pen.)	0 (5)

Semifinals; November 9
2	Lehigh	1
3	Colgate	2
1	Loyola Maryland	0
5	Army	1

Championship; November 11
3	Colgate	1
5	Army	0

== Results ==
=== Quarterfinals ===
November 6
7:00 p.m. EST

No. 3 Colgate	3–2 (a.e.t.)	No. 6 American
Alberto 41'; Ouligian 85'; Morrison 92'	Report	Sjöberg 7'; Sloan 28'

Beyer-Small '76 Field, Hamilton
Attendance: 403
Referee: Christopher Trottier

November 6
7:00 p.m. EST

No. 4 Boston University	0–0 (a.e.t.)	No. 5 Army
	Report
Penalties
Bernardi (penalty scored); Lampis (penalty scored); Cortet (penalty scored); D'Anna (penalty scored); Riccio (penalty missed)	4–5	(penalty scored) Pereira; (penalty scored) Mitchiner; (penalty scored) O'Shea; (penalty scored) Naquin; (penalty scored) Seye

Nickerson Field, Boston
Attendance: 78
Referee: Adam Kilpatrick

=== Semifinals ===
November 9
4:00 p.m. EST

No. 1 Loyola Maryland	0–1	No. 5 Army
	Report	O'Shea 82'

Ridley Athletic Complex, Baltimore
Attendance: 382
Referee: John Brady

November 9
7:00 p.m. EST

No. 2 Lehigh	1–2	No. 3 Colgate
Greene 6'	Report	Harris 22', 31'

Ridley Athletic Complex, Baltimore
Attendance: 382
Referee: Mark Gorak

=== Final ===
November 11
2:00 p.m. EST

No. 3 Colgate	1–0	No. 5 Army
Steven DeLeo 5'	Report

Ridley Athletic Complex, Baltimore
Attendance: 318
Referee: John McCloskey

== Statistics ==
=== Goals ===
Rank	Player	College	Goals
1	Oliver Harris	Colgate	2
2	Kian Alberto	Colgate	1
2	Steven DeLeo	Colgate	1
2	Oscar Greene	Leghigh	1
2	Kentaro Morrison	Colgate	1
2	Keenan O'Shea	Army	1
2	Aram Ouligian	Colgate	1
2	Viggo Sjöberg	American	1
2	Matt Sloan	American	1

== All Tournament Team ==
**2018 Patriot League Men's Soccer All-Tournament team**
- **Oliver Harris, Colgate**
- Jacob Harris, Colgate
- Kentaro Morrison, Colgate
- Christian Clarke, Colgate
- Zac McGraw, Army
- Justin Stoll, Army
- Keenan O’Shea, Army
- Gabriel Carlsson, Loyola Maryland
- Davey Mason, Loyola Maryland
- Mark Forrest, Lehigh
- Oscar Greene, Lehigh
MVP in Bold
