= 2022 Patriot League men's soccer tournament =

- Classification: Division I
- Teams: 6
- Matches: 5
- Attendance: 3,218
- Site: Campus Sites, Higher seed
- Champions: Navy (2nd title)
- Winning coach: Tim O'Donohue (1st title)
- MVP: Zach Wagner (Navy)
- Broadcast: ESPN+

2022 Patriot League men's soccer standings
	Conf.					Overall
Team	W		L		T	W		L		T
Army	5	–	1	–	3	8	–	4	–	5
Boston University	4	–	2	–	3	6	–	5	–	7
Colgate	3	–	1	–	5	7	–	4	–	7
Navy‡	3	–	1	–	5	7	–	5	–	9
Lafayette	3	–	2	–	4	9	–	6	–	4
American	3	–	4	–	2	8	–	7	–	5
Loyola (MD)	2	–	2	–	5	4	–	5	–	8
Lehigh	2	–	5	–	2	3	–	10	–	3
Bucknell	2	–	5	–	2	3	–	12	–	2
Holy Cross	1	–	5	–	3	5	–	9	–	4
‡ – 2022 Patriot Tournament Champion + – At-large invitation to the 2022 NCAA Tournament; As of December 13, 2022; Rankings from United Soccer Coaches; Source: Patriot League

The 2022 Patriot League men's soccer tournament was the postseason men's soccer tournament for the Patriot League held from November 5 through November 12, 2022. The tournament was held at campus sites, with the higher seeded team hosting. The six-team single-elimination tournament consisted of three rounds based on seeding from regular season conference play. The defending champions were the Loyola Greyhounds. They were unable to defend their crown, as they finished in seventh place during the regular season and did not qualify for the tournament. The Navy Midshipmen would go on to claim the title, defeating American in the final, 1–0. The conference championship was the second for the Navy men's soccer program, and the first for head coach Tim O'Donohue. As tournament champions, Loyola earned the Patriot League's automatic berth into the 2022 NCAA Division I men's soccer tournament.

== Seeding ==
Six of the ten Patriot League men's soccer programs qualified for the 2022 Tournament. Teams were seeded based on their regular season records. Tiebreakers were used to determine the seedings of teams who finished with identical conference records. A tiebreaker was required to determine the third and fourth seeds in the tournament as Colgate and Navy both finished with 14 points in conference play. The teams tied their regular season match-up so a second tie breaker of overall records was used. Colgate finished with 7–3–7 record while Navy finished with a 5–4–8 record so Colgate was awarded the third seed and Navy was the fourth seed. A second tiebreaker was required to determine the sixth seed of the tournament and the first team to not qualify for the tournament as American and Loyola (MD) both finished with eleven conference points. The two teams tied their regular season match-up so overall records were used again. American finished with a 6–6–5 record while Loyola (MD) finished with a 4–5–8 record and was therefore unable to defend its tournament crown.

Seed	School	Conference Record	Points
1	Army	5–1–3	18
2	Boston University	4–2–3	15
3	Colgate	3–1–5	14
4	Navy	3–1–5	14
5	Lafayette	3–2–4	13
6	American	3–4–2	11

== Bracket ==
Quarterfinals; Saturday, Nov. 5
4	Navy	1
5	Lafayette	0
3	Colgate	1
6	American	3

Semifinals; Tuesday, Nov. 8
1	Army	1
6	American (a.e.t.)	3
2	Boston University	0 (8)
4	Navy (pen.)	0 (9)

Final; Sunday, Nov. 12
6	American	0
4	Navy	1

== Schedule ==
=== Quarterfinals ===
November 5	#3 Colgate	1–3	#6 American	Hamilton, NY
5:00 p.m. ET	Adam Fam (yellow card) 11'; Bobby Foose 17'; Dale Lepper (yellow card) 69'; Jacob Blackwin (red card) 88'	Report	2' Cooper Nunn; (yellow card) 44', (goal) 75' Troy Elgersma; 69' Evan Schweickert	Stadium: Beyer-Small '76 Field; Attendance: 832; Referee: Frano Somma; Assistant referees: Keegan Bailey; Jim Meyers; Fourth official: William Albro

November 5	#4 Navy	1–0	#5 Lafayette	Annapolis, MD
7:00 p.m. ET	Jason Aoyama 25'	Report	(yellow card) 81' Sebastian Varela	Stadium: Glenn Warner Soccer Facility; Attendance: 562; Referee: Mike DeFelice; Assistant referees: Jordan Gray; Ryan Meyers; Fourth official: Sharon Gingrich

=== Semifinals ===
November 8	#1 Army	1–3 (a.e.t.)	#6 American	West Point, NY
6:00 p.m. ET	Sam Epitime (yellow card) 38'; Gage Guerra 68'; Cooper Warren (yellow card) 76'; Jack Meyer (yellow card) 105'	Report	43' Troy Elgersma; 101' Mattias Cooper; 103' Leo Palomo; (yellow card) 107' Evan Schweickert	Stadium: Malek Stadium; Attendance: 1 Referee: Mark Sutherland; Assistant referees: Brendan Quinn; Kevin Rodrigo; Fourth official: Luis Reis

November 8	#2 Boston University	0–0 (a.e.t.) (8–9 p)	#4 Navy	Boston, MA
:00 p.m. ET		Report	(yellow card) 89' Jason Aoyama	Stadium: Nickerson Field; Attendance: 260; Referee: Kevin Morrison; Assistant referees: John Luk; Jordan Cavaco; Fourth official: Matt Setin
	Penalties
	Quinn Matulis (penalty missed); Diego Rived (penalty scored); Colin Innes (penalty scored); Kevin Torres (penalty scored); Eitan Rosen (penalty scored); Ryan Lau (penalty scored); Quin DeLaMater (penalty scored); Aidan Holmes (penalty scored); Daniel Kim (penalty scored); Andrew Rent (penalty missed)		(penalty scored) David Jackson; (penalty scored) Jason Aoyama; (penalty scored) Baba Kallie; (penalty missed) Connor Walcott; (penalty scored) AJ Schuetz; (penalty scored) Zach Wagner; (penalty scored) JD Wagner; (penalty scored) Cristian Coelho; (penalty scored) Sam Kriel; (penalty scored) Jalen Grant

=== Final ===
November 12	#4 Navy	1–0	#6 American	Annapolis, MD
7:00 p.m. ET	AJ Schuetz 83'; Charlie Kriel (yellow card) 83'	Report	(yellow card) 57' Nevin Baer	Stadium: Glenn Warner Soccer Facility; Attendance: 1,563; Referee: Shaun Papperman; Assistant referees: Jordan Gray; Joseph Knoff; Fourth official: Nicholas Forman

== Statistics ==
=== Goalscorers ===
There have been 10 goals scored in 5 matches, for an average of 2 goals per match (as of November 12, 2022).

2 goals

- Troy Elgersma – American

1 goal

- Mattias Cooper – American
- Cooper Nunn – American
- Leo Palomo – American
- Evan Schweickert – American
- Gage Guerra – Army
- Bobby Foose – Colgate
- Jason Aoyama – Navy
- AJ Schuetz – Navy

== All-Tournament team ==
Player	Team
Cristian Coelho	Navy
Pierce Holbrook	Navy
AJ Schuetz	Navy
**Zach Wagner**	Navy
Mattias Cooper	American
Cooper Nunn	American
Evan Schweickert	American
Gage Guerra	Army
Cooper Warren	Army
Colin Innes	Boston University
Francesco Montali	Boston University

MVP in bold
