= 2015 Patriot League men's soccer tournament =

Tournament details
- Country: United States
- Teams: 6

Final positions
- Champions: Lehigh
- Runners-up: American

Tournament statistics
- Matches played: 5
- Goals scored: 16 (3.2 per match)
- Top goal scorer: Jamie Luchini

Awards
- Best player: Jamie Luchini

The 2015 Patriot League men's soccer tournament was the 26th edition of the tournament. It determined the Patriot League's automatic berth into the 2015 NCAA Division I Men's Soccer Championship.

Lehigh won the tournament, besting the American in the championship match.

== Qualification ==
2015 Patriot League men's soccer standings
	Conf.					Overall
Team	W		L		T	W		L		T
Colgate	7	–	2	–	0	10	–	7	–	2
Boston U. +	6	–	1	–	2	12	–	6	–	2
American	5	–	2	–	2	14	–	5	–	3
Lehigh ‡	4	–	3	–	2	13	–	6	–	3
Bucknell	3	–	3	–	3	7	–	7	–	5
Army	3	–	3	–	3	5	–	8	–	5
Navy	4	–	5	–	0	8	–	9	–	1
Holy Cross	3	–	4	–	2	6	–	8	–	4
Lafayette	2	–	6	–	1	5	–	8	–	5
Loyola (MD)	0	–	8	–	1	2	–	13	–	2
‡-Tournament Champion +-Invited to the NCAA Division I Men's Soccer Championship; As of November 20, 2015; Rankings from NSCAA

The top six teams in the Patriot League based on their conference regular season records qualified for the tournament.

== Bracket ==
Quarterfinals
4	Lehigh	2
5	Bucknell	0
3	American	4
6	Army	1

Semifinals
1	Colgate	0
4	Lehigh	2
2	Boston U	0
3	American	2

Final
4	Lehigh	2
3	American	1

== Schedule ==
=== Quarterfinals ===
November 10	American	4–1	Army	Washington, D.C.
2:00 PM ET	Fanet 24'; Ludwig 50'; Barone 66'; Robley 75'	Report	Williams 22'	Stadium: Reeves Field; Attendance: 169; Referee: Andrew Chapin

November 10	Lehigh	2–0	Bucknell	Bethlehem, Pennsylvania
7:00 PM ET	Forrest 16'; Tuvesson 48'	Report		Stadium: Ulrich Sports Complex; Attendance: 194; Referee: Mohammad Samadpour

=== Semi-finals ===
November 13	Colgate	0–2	Lehigh	Hamilton, New York
4:00 PM ET		Report	Forrest 14'; Luchini 25'	Stadium: Beyer-Small '76 Field; Attendance: 645; Referee: David Mon

November 13	Boston U	0–2	American	Hamilton, New York
7:00 PM ET		Report	Barone 5'; Kaiser 39'	Stadium: Beyer-Small '76 Field; Attendance: 115; Referee: Aaron Corman

=== Championship ===
November 15	American	1–2	Lehigh	Hamilton, New York
1:00 PM ET	Ludwig 60'	Report	Luchini 31', 61'	Stadium: Beyer-Small '76 Field; Attendance: 245; Referee: David Breckner

== Statistical leaders ==
=== Top goalscorers ===
Rank	Player	College	Goals

As of 15 November 2015

== Tournament Best XI ==
- Jamie Luchini (MVP), Lehigh
- Justin Worley, Lehigh
- Danny Gonzalez, Lehigh
- Joe Bogan, Lehigh
- Dylan Hobert, American
- Jordan Manley, American
- Jake Garcia, American
- David Asbjornsson, Boston University
- Danny Foen, Boston University
- Colin O'Neill, Colgate
- Zach Tamen, Colgate
