= 2014 Patriot League men's soccer tournament =

Tournament details
- Country: United States
- Teams: 6

Final positions
- Champions: Bucknell
- Runners-up: Boston U

Tournament statistics
- Matches played: 5
- Goals scored: 10 (2 per match)

Awards
- Best player: Sebastiaan Blickman

The 2014 Patriot League Men's Soccer Tournament was the 25th edition of the tournament. It determined the Patriot League's automatic berth into the 2014 NCAA Division I Men's Soccer Championship.

Bucknell won the tournament, beating Boston University in the championship match. Bucknell won its fourth Patriot League Championship and became the first ever 5-seed to win the Patriot League Men's Soccer Tournament.

2014 Patriot League men's soccer standings
	Conf.					Overall
Team	W		L		T	W		L		T
Boston U.	6	–	0	–	3	12	–	4	–	0
Navy	6	–	1	–	2	11	–	4	–	5
American	5	–	2	–	2	11	–	3	–	4
Lehigh	5	–	3	–	1	10	–	8	–	1
Bucknell ‡ +	4	–	3	–	2	10	–	10	–	3
Army	3	–	4	–	2	6	–	8	–	6
Loyola (MD)	2	–	5	–	2	5	–	8	–	2
Colgate	2	–	6	–	1	6	–	10	–	2
Holy Cross	2	–	6	–	1	5	–	9	–	3
Lafayette	2	–	7	–	0	6	–	10	–	2
‡ - Tournament champion + - Invited to the NCAA Division I Men's Soccer Championship; As of November 21, 2014; Rankings from NSCAA

== Qualification ==
The top six teams in the Patriot League based on their conference regular season records qualified for the tournament. The 3rd and 4th seeded teams hosted the 6th and 5th seeded teams, respectively, in the quarterfinals. Boston University hosted the semi-finals and finals by way of finishing first in the regular season.

== Bracket ==
Quarterfinals
4	Lehigh	0
5	Bucknell	4
3	American	0 (3)
6	Army (pen.)	0 (4)

Semifinals
2	Navy	0 (4)
5	Bucknell (pen.)	0 (5)
1	Boston U (2 OT)	1
6	Army	0

Final
5	Bucknell (OT)	3
1	Boston U	2

== Schedule ==
=== Quarterfinals ===
Patriot League Quarterfinal
November 11
7:00 PM ET

Lehigh	0-4	Bucknell
	Report	30' (o.g.); Grad 32'; Thorsheim 65'; Klug 90' (pen.)

Ulrich Sports Complex
Lehigh University
Bethlehem, PA
Attendance: 517
Referee: Rafal Siudaik
November 11
1:05 PM ET

American	0-0 (a.e.t.)	Army
	Report
Penalties
Robley (penalty scored); Robbs (penalty missed); Garcia (penalty scored); Weinreb (penalty missed); Iraola (penalty scored)	3-4	Jaroscak (penalty missed); Vosvick (penalty scored); Clark (penalty scored); Arroyo (penalty scored); Abousaud (penalty scored)

Reeves Field
American University
Washington, D.C.
Attendance: 408
Referee: Steven Thur

=== Semifinals ===
Patriot League Semifinal
November 14
7:00 PM ET

Navy	0-0 (a.e.t.)	Bucknell
	Report
Penalties
Bascom (penalty scored); Greenspan (penalty scored); Camuti (penalty scored); Suess (penalty missed); Vogel (penalty scored); Dudley (penalty missed)	4-5	Thorsheim (penalty scored); Klug (penalty scored); Grad (penalty scored); Rockmore (penalty missed); Leibensperger (penalty scored); Lenart (penalty scored)

Nickerson Field
Boston University
Boston Massachusetts
Attendance: 393
Referee: Ed Martins
November 14
4:05 PM ET

Boston U	1-0 (a.e.t.)	Army
Badji 109'	Report

Nickerson Field
Boston University
Boston Massachusetts
Attendance: 393
Referee: Jan Halaska

=== Championship ===
Patriot League Championship
November 16
1:00 PM ET

Boston U	2-3 (a.e.t.)	Bucknell
Barker 52'; McBride 70'	Report	Klug 32'; Blickman 54'; Blickman 92'

Nickerson Field
Boston University
Boston Massachusetts
Attendance: 285
Referee: Jorge Gonzalez

== Tournament Best XI ==
- Sebastiaan Blickman (MVP), Bucknell
- Mark Leisensperger, Bucknell
- Chris Thorsheim, Bucknell
- Brian Ward, Bucknell
- Dominique Badji, Boston University
- Kelvin Madzongwe, Boston University
- Cameron Souri, Boston University
- Winston Boldt, Army
- Sean Morgan, Army
- Sam Bascom, Navy
- Derek Vogel, Navy

== See also ==
- Patriot League
- 2014 NCAA Division I Men's Soccer Season
- 2014 NCAA Division I Men's Soccer Championship
