= 2012 Patriot League men's soccer tournament =

Tournament details
- Country: United States
- Teams: 4

The 2012 Patriot League men's soccer tournament will be the conference's 23rd edition of the tournament. The tournament began on November 9 and will end on November 11.

== Bracket ==
Semifinals
1	American	1
4	Bucknell	0
2	Lafayette	1
3	Colgate	0

Championship
1	American
2	Lafayette

== Schedule ==
=== Semifinals ===
November 9, 2012	Colgate	0–1	Lafayette	Washington, D.C.
11:00 AM EST	Reidy (yellow card) 89'	Report	Golini 27'; Turner (yellow card) 58'; Fink (yellow card) 88'	Stadium: Reeves Field; Attendance: 514; Referee: Gus Stsilva

November 9, 2012	Bucknell	0–1	American	Washington, D.C.
2:00 PM EST		Report	McDonald 13'	Stadium: Reeves Field; Attendance: 514; Referee: Shomari Kee

=== Patriot League Championship ===
November 10, 2012	Lafayette	v	American	Washington, D.C.
1:00 PM ET				Stadium: Reeves Field

== See also ==
- Patriot League
- 2012 in American soccer
- 2012 NCAA Division I men's soccer season
- 2012 NCAA Division I Men's Soccer Championship
