= 2016 Patriot League men's soccer tournament =

- Classification: Division I
- Teams: 6
- Matches: 5
- Site: Reeves Field; Washington, D.C.
- Champions: Colgate (6th title)
- Winning coach: Erik Ronning (4th title)

2016 Patriot League men's soccer standings
	Conf.					Overall
Team	W		L		T	W		L		T
American	7	–	1	–	1	11	–	5	–	5
Loyola Maryland	6	–	1	–	2	8	–	7	–	3
Colgate ‡	5	–	3	–	1	13	–	7	–	2
Boston U.	4	–	3	–	2	9	–	6	–	3
Army	4	–	4	–	1	9	–	8	–	2
Bucknell	4	–	4	–	1	7	–	11	–	3
Lafayette	3	–	5	–	1	7	–	9	–	2
Lehigh	3	–	6	–	0	7	–	10	–	1
Holy Cross	1	–	5	–	3	5	–	10	–	3
Navy	1	–	6	–	2	5	–	9	–	4
‡-Tournament Champion +-Invited to the NCAA Division I Men's Soccer Championship; As of 18 November 2016; Rankings from NSCAA

The 2016 Patriot League men's soccer tournament, was the 27th edition of the tournament. It determined the Patriot League's automatic berth into the 2016 NCAA Division I Men's Soccer Championship.

Colgate won the Patriot League title, making it their sixth Patriot League championship. The Raiders defeated American in the championship, 5–4 on penalties following a 1–1 draw after 110 minutes.

== Seeding ==
The top six programs qualified for the Patriot League Tournament.

No.	School	Conference					Overall					Qualification
No.	School	W	L	T	PCT.	Pts.	W	L	T	PCT.	Pts.	Qualification
1	American	7	1	1	.833	22	11	5	5	.643	38	Patriot League semifinals
2	Loyola Maryland	6	1	2	.778	20	8	7	3	.528	27	Patriot League semifinals
3	Colgate	5	3	1	.611	16	13	7	2	.636	41	Patriot League first round
4	Boston	4	3	2	.556	14	8	6	3	.559	27	Patriot League first round
5	Bucknell	4	4	1	.500	13	7	11	3	.405	24	Patriot League first round
6	Army	4	4	1	.500	13	9	8	2	.526	29	Patriot League first round
7	Lafayette	3	5	1	.389	10	7	9	2	.444	23	
8	Lehigh	3	6	0	.333	9	7	10	1	.417	22	
9	Holy Cross	1	5	3	.278	6	5	10	3	.361	18	
10	Navy	1	6	2	.222	3	5	9	4	.389	19	

== Bracket ==
First round November 10
4	Boston U	1 (1)
5	Bucknell (pen.)	1 (4)
3	Colgate	3
6	Army	2

Semifinals; November 11
1	American	1
5	Bucknell	0
2	Loyola Maryland	1
3	Colgate	3

Championship; November 13
1	American	1 (4)
3	Colgate (pen.)	1 (5)

== Awards ==
**Patriot league Men's Soccer All-Tournament team**

**Ethan Kutler**, Colgate
Ricky Brown, Colgate
Jared Stroud, Colgate
Zach Tamen, Colgate
Michael Cherry, American
Jake Garcia, American
Panos Nakhid, American
Brian Saramago, Loyola Maryland
Barry Sharifi, Loyola Maryland
Sebastiaan Blickman, Bucknell
Ryan Ott, Bucknell

MVP's in Bold
