= 1944 Navy Midshipmen men's soccer team =

Naval Academy soccer season

1944 Navy Midshipmen men's soccer

National Champions (ISFA/NSCAA)
- Conference: Independent
- Record: 6–1–0
- Head coach: Tom Taylor (24th season)
- Home stadium: Thompson Stadium

The 1944 Navy Midshipmen men's soccer team represented the United States Naval Academy during the 1944 ISFA season. It was the program's 24th season of existence.

The 1944 season saw Navy win the ISFA national championship, and was voted by NSCAA as the number one team in the nation following the end of the season. It was Navy's third college soccer national championship. The program was coached by former Olympic gold medalist, Tom Taylor who had been coaching the program since its inception.

== Schedule ==
Date Time, TV	Rank^{#}	Opponent^{#}	Result	Record	Site City, State
Regular Season
10-21-1944*		at Penn State	W 2–1	1–0–0	Thompson Stadium; University Park, PA
10-28-1944*		Penn	W 8–1	2–0–0	Thompson Stadium; Annapolis, MD
11-04-1944*		Muhlenberg	W 7–0	3–0–0	Thompson Stadium; Annapolis, MD
11-08-1944*		Navy–Bainbridge	L 1–3	3–1–0	Thompson Stadium; Annapolis, MD
11-15-1944*		Bucknell	W 6–0	4–1–0	Thompson Stadium; Annapolis, MD
11-18-1944*		Swarthmore	W 5–0	5–1–0	Thompson Stadium; Annapolis, MD
11-25-1944*		at Army; Army–Navy Cup	W 1–0	6–1–0	Michie Stadium; West Point, NY
*Non-conference game. ^{#}Rankings from United Soccer Coaches. (#) Tournament seedings in parentheses.

== Honors ==
=== All-Americans ===
Three players were named All-Americans by the Intercollegiate Soccer Football Association:

==== First-team ====
- George Reaves, DF
- Robert Kirk, MF
- Arturo Callisto, FW

==== Second-team ====
- R.J. Leuschner
