= Glenn Warner (soccer coach) =

Football coach

Floyd Hall "Glenn" Warner (1910, Springfield, Massachusetts – 1997, Crofton, Maryland) was head coach of the United States Naval Academy's men's soccer team from 1942 to 1975. Warner played on the Springfield College soccer team that was undefeated in its 1931 season. He served as president of the National Soccer Coaches Association of America in 1953.

He led the USNA team to a national title in 1964, the only won by Navy up to present.
