= Glenn Warner Soccer Facility =

Soccer stadium at the United States Naval Academy in Annapolis, Maryland

- Interactive map of Glenn Warner Soccer Facility
- Full name: Warner Stadium
- Address: Annapolis, MD; United States
- Coordinates: 38°59′3″N 76°28′54″W
- Owner: United States Naval Academy
- Operator: USNA Athletics
- Capacity: 2,500
- Type: Stadium
- Surface: Bermuda grass
- Current use: Soccer

Construction
- Opened: 2002; 24 years ago
- Cost: $4.2 million
- Architects: Cochran, Stephenson & Donkervoet, Inc., Architects

Tenants
- Navy Midshipmen (NCAA) teams: men's and women's soccer

Website
- navysports.com/glenn-warner-facility

The Glenn Warner Soccer Facility is a soccer-specific stadium at the United States Naval Academy in Annapolis, Maryland. The college soccer facility is named for beloved longtime coach Glenn Warner, who leaded the soccer team from 1942 to 1975, even winning a national title in 1964.

Opened in 2002, the stadium serves as home venue to the Navy Midshipmen men's and women's soccer teams.

It was the site of Crystal Palace Baltimore's first-ever match, a 3–1 loss to its parent club on July 15, 2006.
