= Colgate Raiders men's soccer =

- Founded: 1920; 106 years ago
- University: Colgate University
- Head coach: Erik Ronning (21st. season)
- Conference: Patriot League
- Location: Hamilton, New York
- Stadium: Beyer-Small '76 Field (capacity: 1,300)
- Nickname: Raiders
- Colors: Maroon and white
Home	Away

NCAA Tournament Round of 16
- 2017

NCAA Tournament Round of 32
- 2018

NCAA Tournament appearances
- 1959, 1966, 2007, 2008, 2011, 2016, 2017, 2018

Conference Tournament championships
- 1992, 1997, 2007, 2008, 2011, 2016, 2017, 2018

Conference Regular Season championships
- 1997, 2008, 2010, 2015

The Colgate Raiders men's soccer is the intercollegiate varsity soccer team representing Colgate University, located in Hamilton, New York. The team is a member of the Patriot League athletic conference of NCAA Division I.

The University first fielded a soccer team in 1920, making its official debut v Hamilton College, to which easily defeated 8–0. Colgate finished that season with a 2–1 record. Colgate is currently coached by Erik Ronning, who has been in charge since 2005.

The Raiders have won eight Patriot League tournament championships, the last in 2018.

== Players ==
=== Current roster ===
As of December 2025

Note: Flags indicate national team as defined under FIFA eligibility rules; some limited exceptions apply. Players may hold more than one non-FIFA nationality.

No.	Pos.	Nation	Player
0	GK	USA	Mason Christiansen
1	GK	USA	Eric Widrick
2	DF	USA	Connor Cates
3	DF	USA	Malik Samms
4	MF	USA	Drew Stephans
5	DF	CAN	Julian Di Lucia
6	MF	ENG	Jack Beerling
7	MF	USA	Connor Hearn
9	FW	USA	Alex St. John
10	MF	USA	Cason Stafford
11	FW	USA	Blake Pipkin
12	MF	USA	Gavin Krauss

No.	Pos.	Nation	Player
13	MF	USA	Ethan Harris
14	FW	USA	Charlie Yates
15	DF	USA	Liam Winograd
16	FW	USA	Cole Ramey
17	FW	USA	Ryan Schachter
18	MF	USA	Will Thygeson
19	FW	USA	Colin Hughes
20	FW	USA	Conor Geraghty
21	MF	USA	Otto Bourne
22	DF	USA	Evan Danaher
23	FW	USA	Owen Cheney
24	DF	USA	Connor Smith

=== Records ===
Top scorers

#	Player	Tenure	Goals
1	Bobby Newman	1992–95	37
2	Jim Taylor	1958–60	34
3	Ethan Kutler	2013–16	33
4	Tom Tucker	1964–66	28
5	Steven Miller	2007–11	27

Most assistances

#	Player	Tenure	Assist.
1	Jared Stroud	2014–17	30
2	Brendan Skonieczki	1997–00	18
3	Rob Stone	1987–90	15
4	Ethan Kutler	2013–16	15
5	Rob Damico	1995–98	14
5	Doug Reffue	1988–91	14
5	Tim Gerges	1998–01	14
5	Sean O'Sullivan	2002–05	14

=== Professional players ===
The following list includes Colgate players that became professionals.

Player	Pos.	Professional career (teams)	Ref.
(United States) Barry Small		New York Apollo	
(United States) Ethan Kutler	DF	Greater Binghamton, Michigan Bucks, New York Red Bulls, Pittsburgh Riverhounds	
(United States) Steven Miller	DF, MF	Ocean City Barons, Michigan Bucks, Jammerbugt, Wilmington Hammerheads, FC Tulsa, others	
(United States) Jared Stroud	FW	New York Red Bulls, Austin, St. Louis City, D.C. United	

== Coaches ==
=== Current staff ===
Position	Name
Head coach	Erik Ronning
Assist. coach	Ricky Brown
Assist. coach	Tim Stanton

=== Coaching history ===
#	Name	Tenure	Seasons	Matches	Record	Pct.
1	Col. James S. Ballentine	1920–24	5	31	14–10–7	.564
2	James M. Dalgety	1935–49	15	106	39–57–10	.415
3	Thomas R. Dockrell	1950	1	7	2–5–0	.285
4	Mark S. Randall, Jr.	1951–64	14	125	74–42–9	.628
5	David F. Carrington	1965	1	12	7–5–0	.583
6	John W. Beyer	1966–79	14	162	81–66–15	.546
7	Paul Rose	1980–84	5	73	29–37–7	.445
8	Michael Doherty	1985–2004	20	361	160–160–41	.500
9	Erik Ronning	2005–present				

== Stadium ==
The team play their home games at Beyer-Small '76 Field, inaugurated in August 2014. The stadium featured a FIFA certified FieldTurf surface, with a capacity for 1,300 spectators. The stadium also serves as home venue to the women's soccer program.

The stadium was dedicated to two key figures in Colgate's soccer history, coach John Beyer '63 (1925–2019, was in charge of the team from 1966 to 1979, serving also as basketball and tennis coach) and Barry Small '76 (a former soccer and baseball athlete who was part of the University Trustee). Small was also a two-time All-New York Region selection. Small would make a professional career, playing in New York Apollo of now defunct American Soccer League (ASL).

== Titles ==
=== Conference ===
Conference	Championship	Titles	Winning years	Ref.
Patriot League	Tournament	8	1992, 1997, 2007, 2008, 2011, 2016, 2017, 2018	
Patriot League	Regular season	4	1997, 2008, 2010, 2015	

== Team statistics ==
=== NCAA appearances ===
Colgate's appearances at the NCAA D-I tournament:

Year	Stage	Rival	Res.	Score
1959	First round	Bridgeport	L	2–3 (a.e.t.)
1966	First round	Bridgeport	L	1–3
2007	First round	South Florida	L	1–2
2008	First round	Boston College	L	0–2
2011	First round	Rutgers	L	2–4
2016	First round	UCLA	L	2–4
2017	First round	UMass	W	2–0
2017	Second round	Michigan	W	3–2
2017	Third round	Louisville	L	0–2
2018	First round	New Hampshire	W	1–0
2018	Second round	Wake Forest	L	0–2
