= Holy Cross Crusaders men's soccer =

American college soccer team

- Founded: 1965; 61 years ago
- University: Holy Cross University
- Head coach: Matt Brown
- Conference: Patriot League
- Location: Worcester, Massachusetts, US
- Stadium: Linda Johnson Smith Soccer Stadium (capacity: 1,320)
- Nickname: Crusaders
- Colors: Royal purple
Home	Away

NCAA tournament appearances
- 2002

Conference tournament championships
- 2002

Conference regular season championships
- 1995, 1999, 2001, 2002, 2007

The Holy Cross Crusaders men's soccer team represents the College of the Holy Cross in Worcester, Massachusetts in NCAA Division I college soccer. Holy Cross men's soccer competes in the Patriot League. The Crusaders are coached by Matt Brown.

The team players their home matches at Linda Johnson Smith Soccer Stadium, a 1,320-seat venue opened in 2006, with natural grass surface.

== History ==
The Holy Cross men's soccer program began in 1965 with a 2–7–0 record.

Holy Cross has been Patriot League regular season champions in 1995, 1999, 2001, 2002, and 2007.

The Crusaders have been Patriot League champions and made the NCAA tournament once in 2002. Fairleigh Dickinson eliminated Holy Cross from the 2002 NCAA tournament in penalties. The 2002 team finished with a program-best 13–5–1 record.
