= Lafayette Leopards men's soccer =

- Founded: 1913; 113 years ago
- University: Lafayette College
- Head coach: Dennis Bohn (25th. season)
- Conference: Patriot League; I Division
- Location: Easton, Pennsylvania, US
- Stadium: Gummeson Grounds (capacity: n/a)
- Nickname: Leopards
- Colors: Maroon and white
Home	Away

NCAA tournament appearances
- 1995, 1998, 2003, 2005, 2012, 2025

Conference tournament championships
- 1984, 1986, 1987, 1994, 1995, 1998, 1999, 2003, 2005, 2012, 2025

Conference regular season championships
- 1993, 1994, 1998, 2000, 2005

The Lafayette Leopards men's soccer is the intercollegiate varsity soccer team representing the Lafayette College, located in Easton, Pennsylvania. The team is a member of the Patriot League athletic conference of NCAA Division I.

The Leopards' current head coach is Dennis Bohn, who is in charge since 2001. The team play their home matches at Gummerson Grounds, named in honor of former Lafayette soccer player Peter Gummeson '80, who gifted the estimated $4 million to build the stadium. Gummerson Grounds hosted its first match in 2023.

Established in 1913, the Lafayette soccer program is the most winning team of the Patriot League tournament with eight championships won, the last in 2025.

== History ==
=== First years ===
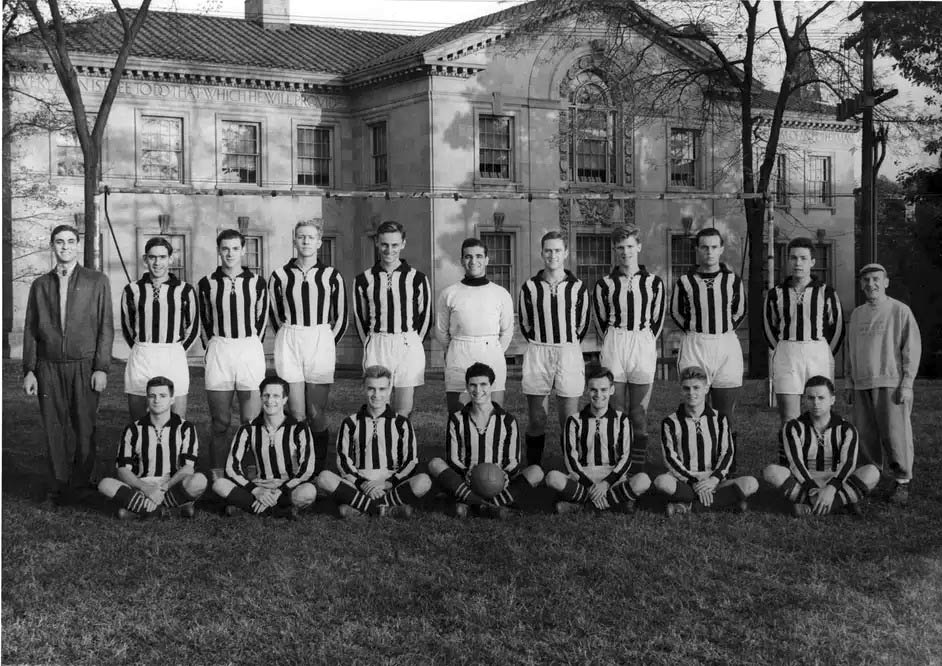
An early Lafayette team and coaching staff

The team was established in 1913, when a group of young students of the Lafayette College who were soccer enthusiasts and had played the sport at high school, wanted to form a team. At the time, the college did not have an athletic director, only the main sports (football and athletics) have committees to make decisions. As that group went to the city of Easton with an excellent reception, they were encouraged to start a soccer program, receiving the approval from the college.

The first coach was David Paul, an Irish who had played soccer in high school and had a strong interest in the development of the game. Under Paul's guidance, the team played four games in its first year to end with a 1–3 record. Despite the poor results, the cornerstone for the establishment of soccer at Lafayette had been placed.

The World War I forced soccer to interrupt activities, but it came back in 1920, with Scotty Cuthbertson as coach, while Paul continued as assistant coach. Paul's worked focusing on the "teamwork", a concept of fellowship that emphasized on soccer as a team sport, often omitted by most of the coaches at the time. Cuthbertson pushed Lafayette to its first winning season, ending with a 8–3 record, although it was the only season he spent with the team.

=== 1920s to 1970s ===
In the late 1920s, Lafayette was coached by Scottie's two brothers, Alex and A.W. Alex would then come back from 1938 to 1942, achieving 9 wins (the most at the time). In 1947, Lafayette hired coach Jack Trotter, who set a 14–38–4 record during his four years with the team. For the following years, the college decide to go for coaches who were primary focused on basketball, some of them were Bill Van Breda Koff, George Davidson, and Gary Williams. Koff had been a great athlete at Princeton University while Williams took position on both teams, basketball and soccer, during his tenure in Lafayette, where he ended with a 27–37–13 record. Koff had the most successful run, with a 18–15–1 record, the first winning season since Scottie Cuthbertson.

George Davidson had a long time (more than a decade) at Lafayette for a 51–72–6 record, achieving the most wins for the team. When his time as coach ended in 1966, Davidson continued in Lafayette as the athletic director. Lafayette accepted an invitation to join recently formed East Coast Conference (ECC) in order to become a true first class team.

=== Patriot League's success ===
Although Lafayette had never been a soccer powerhouse, the coming of coach Steve Reinhardt was a major shift in the history of the program. During his ten years with the team (1980–90), Lafayette got a successful 131–66–19 record, under Reinhardt's premises of "win at any cost" that brought the team so good results. The team won the ECC championships in 1984 (with a 3–0 over Towson), 1986 (5–1 to Drexel), and 1987 (5–0 to Rider).

In the Patriot League tournament, Lafayette lost to Fordham 0–1 in the final. Nevertheless, Lafayette would become the most winning team of the competition, with eight titles won between 1994 and 2025, which earned them the right to play in the NCAA tournament.

Reinhardt was replaced by Jeff Gettler in 1992. Under his coaching, Lafayette achieved a 40–26–8 record, winning also the 1994 Patriot tournaments (defeating Army 1–0 in the championship game). That same year, Gettler was named the "Patriot League Coach of the Year".

Nelson Rodriguez, who had been Gettler's assistant coach, was appointed as head coach in 1995, achieving a 20–13–4 record in two years, also winning the 1995 Patriot tournament, the second for the program. The second conference title won by Lafayette in 1995 secured them a place in the 1995 NCAA tournament, where the team made their debut defeating Cornell in the first round, then losing to Brown 0–2.

In 1998, Lafayette hired Tim Lehanan as coach, who compiled a 32–23–3 record, including two Patriot tournament titles (1998, 1999). Lafayette also made their second participation in the NCAA tournament, being beaten by Clemson 0–5. After those two successful years, Lehanan left the team to follow an offer from Northwestern University of Chicago, where he would have a successful run as well.

=== Later years ===
After the tenures of Rodríguez and Lenahan ended, the athletic department hired Dennis Bohn, who was a close friend to Lenahan and had worked as his assistant coach. Bohn was a graduate of Columbia University where he had played soccer (being praised as a "natural leader" on the field) and basketball. Bohn took the team in 2001 to win four Patriot tournament championships (2003, 2005, 2012, and 2025), earning the right to compete in the NCAA championship.

Lafayette did not have successful participations in the NCAA tournaments, being eliminated in first round by Rutgers (2003), Creighton (2005), Virginia (2012), and Cornell (2025).

As of 2025, Bohn totalised a record of 197–156–84. His tenure in Lafayette is the longest in the history of the program.

== Players ==
=== Current roster ===
As of December 2025

Note: Flags indicate national team as defined under FIFA eligibility rules; some limited exceptions apply. Players may hold more than one non-FIFA nationality.

No.	Pos.	Nation	Player
00	GK	USA	Francisco Benbow
0	GK	USA	Marco Brok
1	GK	USA	Eric Axtman
2	DF	USA	Jeovany Gamez
3	MF	USA	Cade Maglione
4	MF	USA	Beaux Lizewski
5	DF	USA	Max Newman
6	MF	USA	Anthony Durling
7	MF	USA	Connor DeAngelis
8	MF	USA	Bryson Vail
9	FW	USA	Gabe Faust
10	MF	USA	Samir Dishnica
11	FW	CYP	Nicolas Papadopoulos
12	DF	USA	Noah Amankulor
13	MF	USA	Oliver Gordon

No.	Pos.	Nation	Player
14	MF	USA	Conor Cohen
15	ME	USA	Griffin Feather
16	DF	USA	Cole Duschang
17	MF	USA	Max Fujimori
18	MF	USA	Thomas Hughes
19	FW	USA	Tommy Clark
20	DF	USA	Jackson Vajda
21	FW	USA	Cameron Bohn
22	FW	USA	Riley Martin
23	DF	USA	Nikolas Hadjimitsis
24	DF	USA	Joseph Lee
25	DF	USA	James Melnick
29	FW	USA	Roy Biegon
30	GK	USA	Harrison Wolfrom
34	DF	USA	Nicholas Liebich

=== Records ===
key

- – member of the Lafayette Hall of Fame

Top scorers

#	Nat.	Player	Tenure	Goals
1	(United States)	Mark Neumann	1981-85	49
2	(United States)	Peter Lerner	1984-88	43
3	(United States)	Marten Lerner	1987-91	35
4	(United States)	Hale Lombard	2019-23	33
5	(Germany)	Timo Pape	1990-94	26
5	(United States)	Scott Hawkins	2004-08	26

Assistances

#	Nat.	Player	Tenure	Assist.
1	(United States)	Nick Chrisanthon	1993-97	33
2	(United States)	Thomas Harju	2003-07	32
3	(United States)	Peter Lerner	1984-88	30
4	(United States)	Mark Neumann	1981-85	23
4	(United States)	Jamie Mullarkey	2000–04	23
5	(United States)	Eric Rosenbloom	1993-97	22

Saves

#	Nat.	Player	Tenure	Saves
1		Peter Lugar	1988-92	426
1		Matt Weaver	1992–96	426
2		Matt Lancor	1984-88	403
3		Alex Sutton	2018-22	240
4		Craig Schroeder	1997-01	209
5		Eric Lohse	1981-85	188

== Coaches ==
=== Current staff ===
As of 15 December 2025

Position	Name
Head coach	Dennis Bohn
Assist. coach	Gabriel Robinson
Assist. coach	Josh Bordwick
Assist. coach	Ismar Tandir

=== Coaching history ===
As of December 2025

#	Name	Seas.	Tenure	Record
1	David Paul	1	1913–14	1–3–0
2	Stevens	1	1914–15	4–4–2
3	Stilwell & Wikel	3	1915–18	3–11–0
4	Scotty Cuthbertson	1	1920–21	8–3–0
5	Hugh Mcllwain	1	1921–22	1–1–2
6	Alex Cuthberston	1	1922–23	2–2–0
7	D.W. Riddagh	1	1923–24	1–5–1
8	Robert Morrison	1	1924–25	1–4–1
8	James Eaton	1	1924–25	1–4–1
9	Fred W. Pepper	1	1925–26	1–3–2
10	A.W. Cuthbertson	1	1926–27	0–5–1
11	D.W. Riddagh	1	1927–28	3–6–1
12	James Easton	1	1928–29	1–7–1
13	J.E. Deardon	2	1929–31	4–13–2
14	Walter Deardon	3	1931–34	5–24–1
15	Robert Stewart	1	1935–36	2–6–2

#	Name	Seas.	Tenure	Record
16	Frank Fischer	1	1936–37	5–11–3
17	Alex Cuthbertson	4	1938–42	9–31–3
18	James Deardon	1	1946–47	0–10–0
19	Jack Trotter	4	1947–51	14–38–4
20	Bill Van Breda Kolff	2	1952-54	18–15–1
21	George Davidson	11	1955–66	51–72–6
22	Herb Schmidt	1	1967–68	13–14–1
23	Gerry Clinton	1	1969–70	10–11–4
24	Gary Williams	7	1971–78	35–54–17
25	Jamie McLaughlin	1	1979–80	4–11–2
26	Steve Reinhardt	10	1980–90	131–66–19
27	Jeff Gettler	3	1991–94	40–26–8
28	Nelson Rodriguez	2	1995–97	20–31–4
29	Tim Lenahan	2	1998–00	32–23–3
30	Dennis Bohn	24	2001–present	197–156–84

== Titles ==
=== Conference ===
Conference	Championship	Titles	Winning years
East Coast	Regular season	3	1984, 1986, 1987
Patriot League	Tournament	8	1994, 1995, 1998, 1999, 2003, 2005, 2012, 2025
Patriot League	Regular season	5	1993, 1994, 1998, 2000, 2005

== Team statistics ==
=== NCAA appearances ===
Lafayette's appearances in NCAA tournament are listed below:

Key

- a.e.t. – Match went to extra time
- p – Match decided by a penalty shootout after extra time

Season	Stage	Rival	Res.	Score
1995	First round	Cornell	W	1–0 (a.e.t.)
1995	Second round	Brown	L	0–2
1998	First round	Clemson	L	0–5
2003	First round	Rutgers	L	1–3
2005	First round	Creighton	L	0–3
2012	First round	Virginia	L	0–1
2025	First round	Cornell	L	0–4
