= Boston University Terriers men's soccer =

- Founded: 1949; 77 years ago
- University: Boston University
- Head coach: Kevin Nylen (6th. season)
- Conference: Patriot League
- Location: Boston, Massachusetts, US
- Stadium: Nickerson Field (capacity: 9,871)
- Nickname: Terriers
- Colors: Scarlet and white
Home	Away

NCAA tournament Round of 32
- 1985, 1988, 1990, 1993, 1994, 2004, 2008

NCAA tournament appearances
- 1980, 1985, 1986, 1988, 1990, 1991, 1993, 1994, 1995, 1996. 1997, 2004, 2008, 2015, 2023

Conference tournament championships
- 1993, 1994, 1995, 1996, 1997, 2004, 2008

Conference regular season championships
- 1979, 1990, 1991, 1992, 1993, 1994, 2001, 2004, 2008, 2010, 2011, 2014, 2023, 2024

The Boston University Terriers men's soccer is the intercollegiate varsity soccer team representing Boston University, located in Boston, Massachusetts. The team is a member of the Patriot League athletic conference of NCAA Division I.

The University first fielded a soccer team in 1949, being coached by John Anderson (who was in charge until 1965). Boston finished their debut season with a 1–1–3 record. The team is currently coached by Kevin Nylen, who has been in charge since 2020.

The Terriers have won a total of eight conference titles, having competed in the North Atlantic Conference (5 titles), two America East Conference (2), and one Patriot League (1).

== Stadium ==
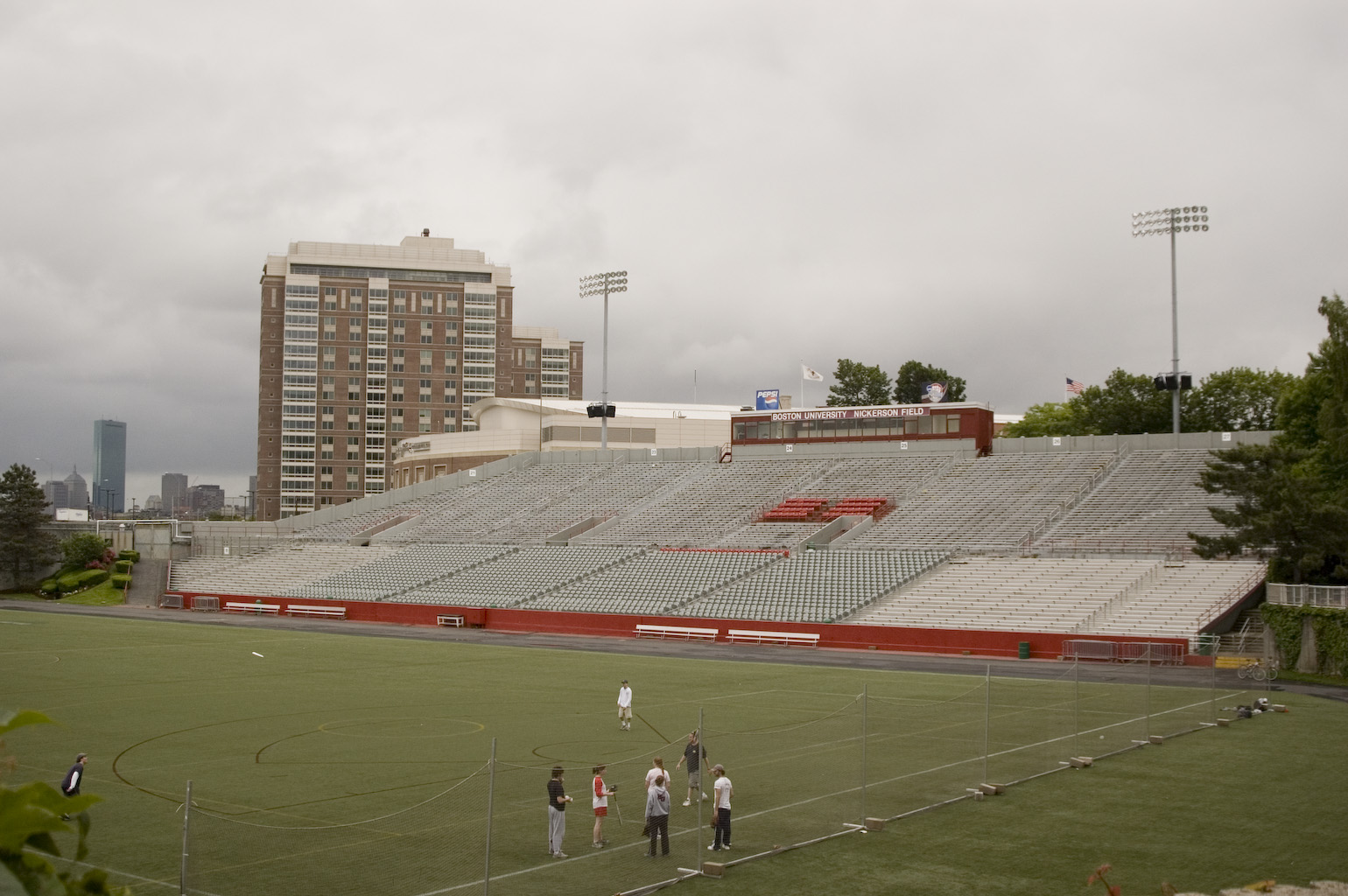
Nickerson Field, UB soccer stadium

The Terriers play their home matches at Nickerson Field, with capacity for 9,871 spectators. The stadium, opened in 1915, is also home venue to the UB women's soccer, and lacrosse teams.

The stadium is located on the site of Braves Field, the former home ballpark of the Boston Braves, a major league baseball team in the National League; the franchise relocated to Milwaukee in March 1953, and relocated again in 1966, becoming the Atlanta Braves. Parts of Braves Field, such as the entry gate and right field pavilion, remain as portions of the current stadium. The old Braves Field ticket office at Harry Agganis Way also remains, now used by the Boston University Police Department as headquarters complete with a cellblock. The stadium has been the home of BU teams longer (50-plus years) than it was the home of the Braves (parts of 38 seasons).

The field is named for William Emery Nickerson (1853–1930), a partner of King C. Gillette during the early years of the Gillette Safety Razor Company.

== Players ==
=== Current roster ===
As of December 2025

Note: Flags indicate national team as defined under FIFA eligibility rules; some limited exceptions apply. Players may hold more than one non-FIFA nationality.

No.	Pos.	Nation	Player
0	GK	USA	William Clavier
1	GK	USA	Ben Alexander
2	DF	USA	Ryan Lau
3	DF	USA	Ben Mazza
4	DF	USA	John Roman
6	MF	ESP	Diego Rived
7	FW	USA	Andrea Di Blasio
8	MF	USA	Sebastian Otero
9	FW	ENG	Alex Bonnington
11	MF	USA	Ethan Gill
12	FW	ITA	Lapo Romieri
13	MF	GER	Pharis Petrica

No.	Pos.	Nation	Player
14	DF	USA	Quin DeLaMater
15	DF	USA	Aidan Kieffer
16	DF	USA	Giuseppe Bagnato
18	DF	USA	Anthony Harper
19	MF	USA	Markus Ramsey
21	MF	USA	Sebastian Knight
22	FW	USA	Dylan Williams
23	DF	USA	Quinn Cooper
24	DF	USA	Charlie Tuckerman
25	FW	USA	Damola Salami
26	MF	USA	Jason Zacarias
27	FW	BER	Austin Mowbray
30	GK	USA	Sheraz Saadat

=== Records ===
Top scorers

#	Nat.	Player	Goals	Tenure
1	(England)	Nick Bone	61	1994–97
2	(Greece)	George Karalexis	43	1963–65
3	(United States)	Mike Bertos	36	1987–90
3	(Nigeria)	Michael Emenalo	36	1986–89
4	(Norway)	Joachim Kaland	33	1998–01
4	(Norway)	Sigurd Dalen	33	1996–99
5	(Nigeria)	Okereke Emesih	32	1990–93

Most assistances

#	Nat.	Player	Assist.	Tenure
1	(Wales)	Andrew Dorman	37	2000–03
2	(United States)	Christophe Verhaegen	36	1987–90
3	(Norway)	Ola Olsen	32	1992–95
3	(Nigeria)	Michael Emenalo	32	1986–89
4	(Republic of Ireland)	David Silke	31	1987–90
5	(Norway)	Sigurd Dalen	29	1996–99

=== Professional players ===
UB players that play/have played at professional levels are:

UB players in the pros

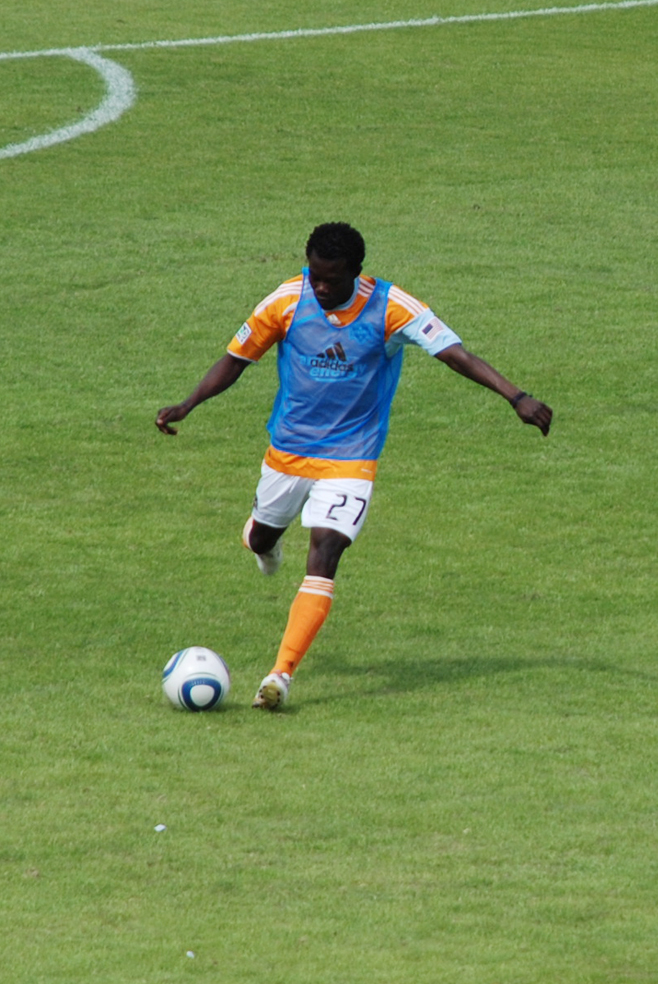
Samuel Appiah

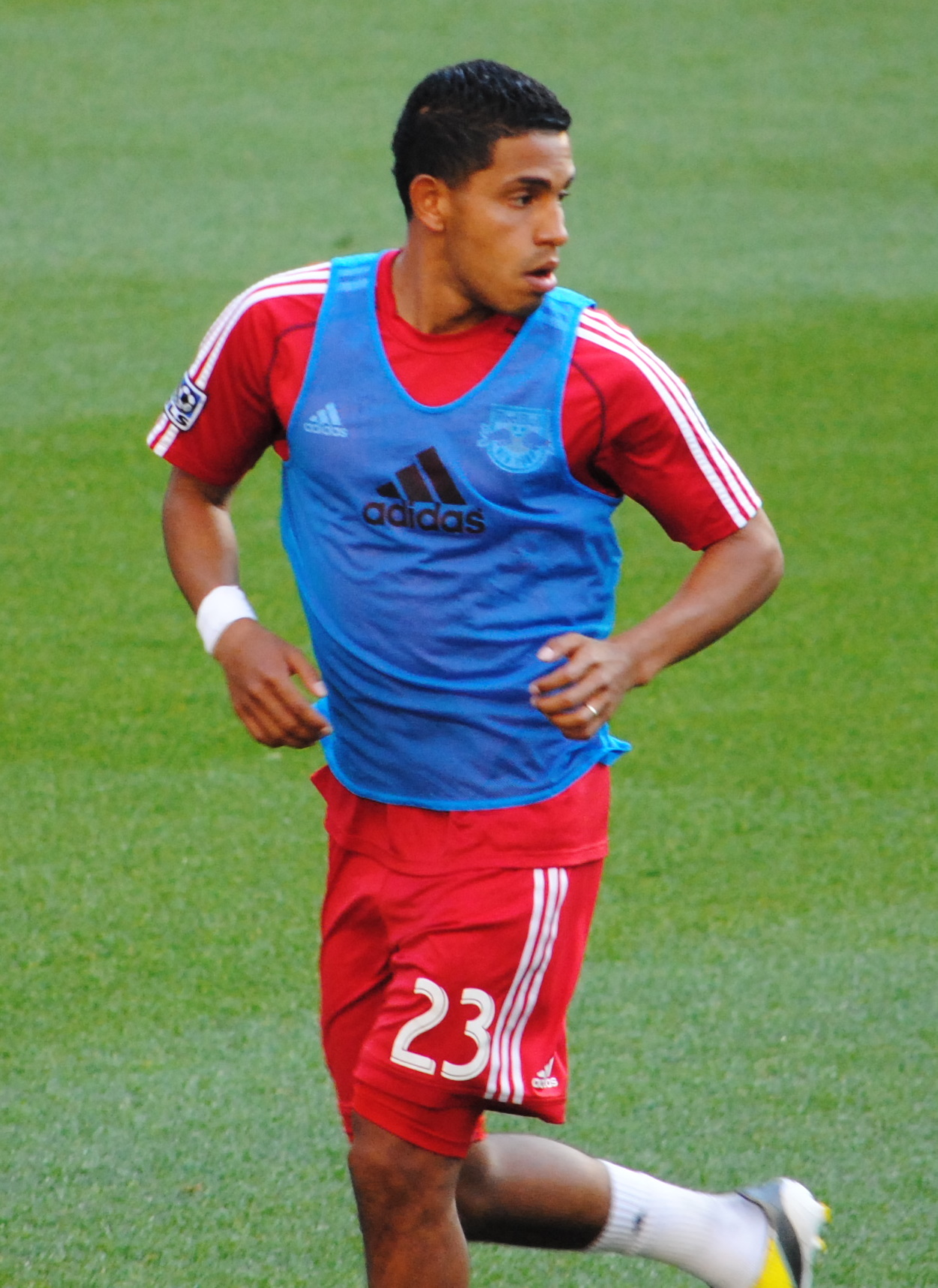
Michael Bustamante

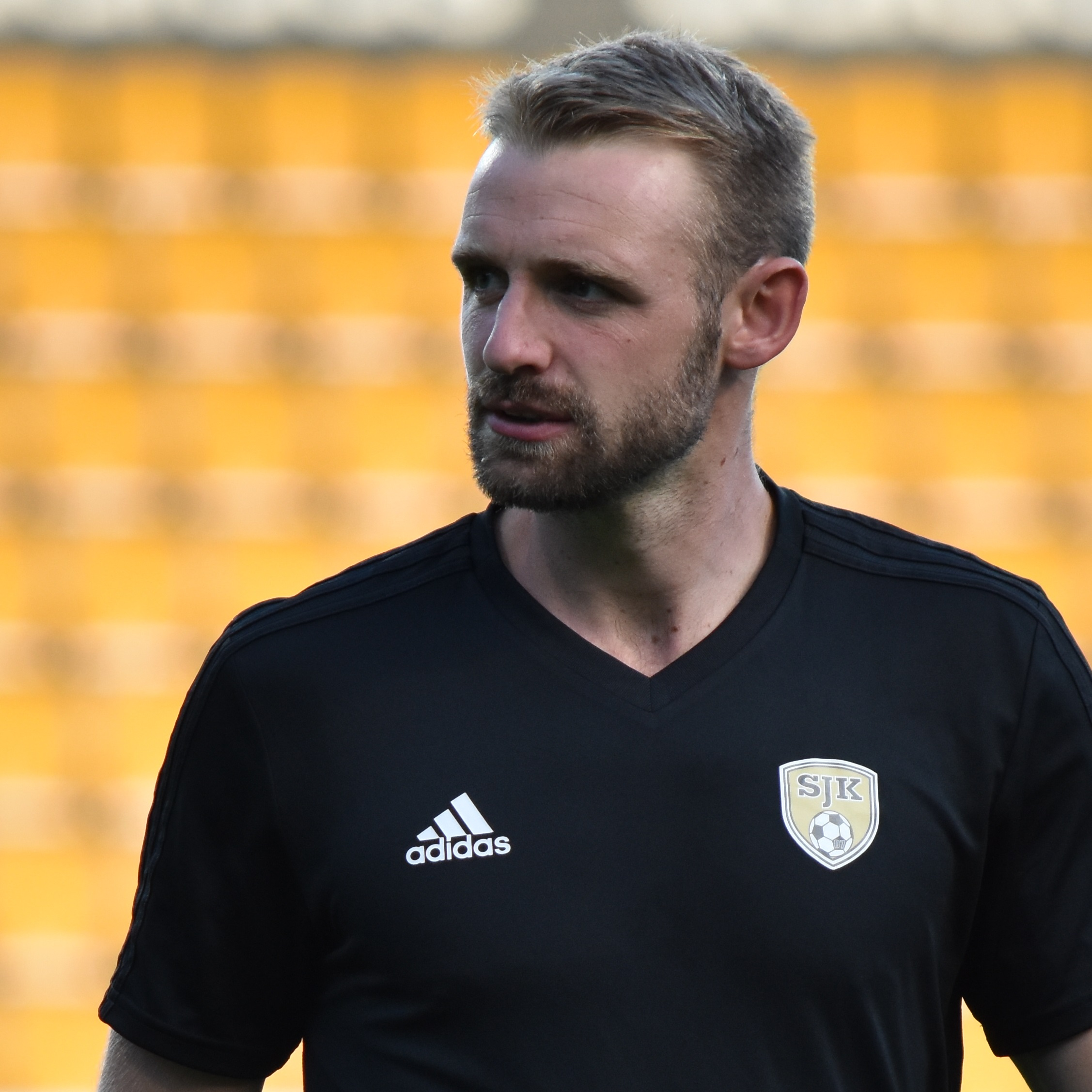
Richie Dorman

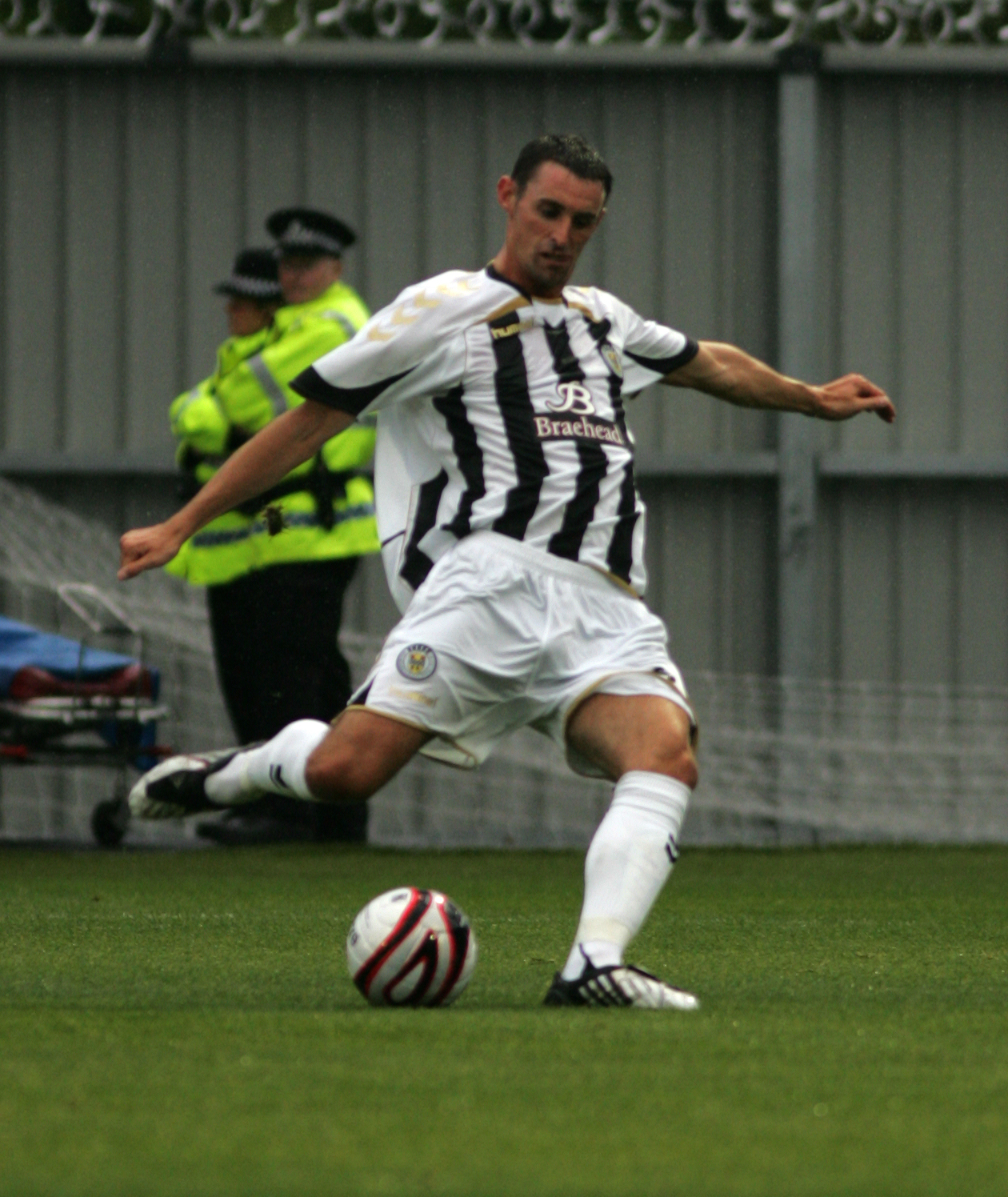
Andy Dorman

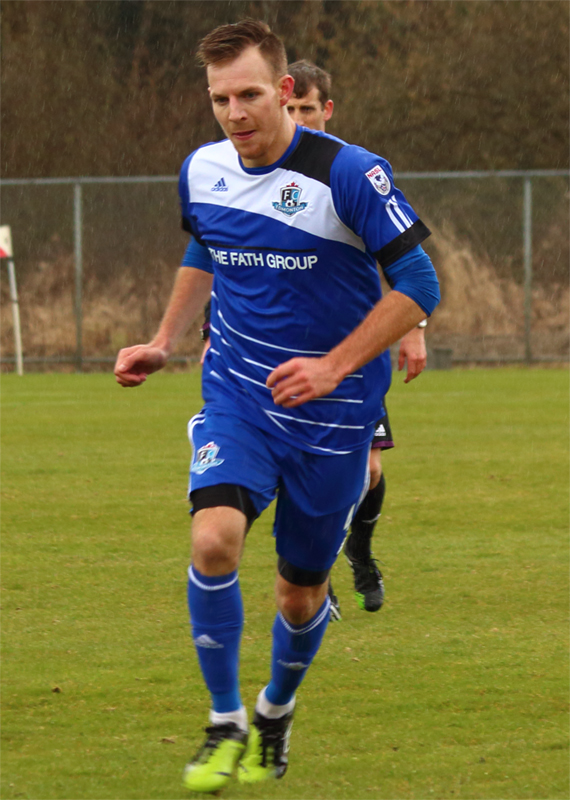
Neil Hlavaty

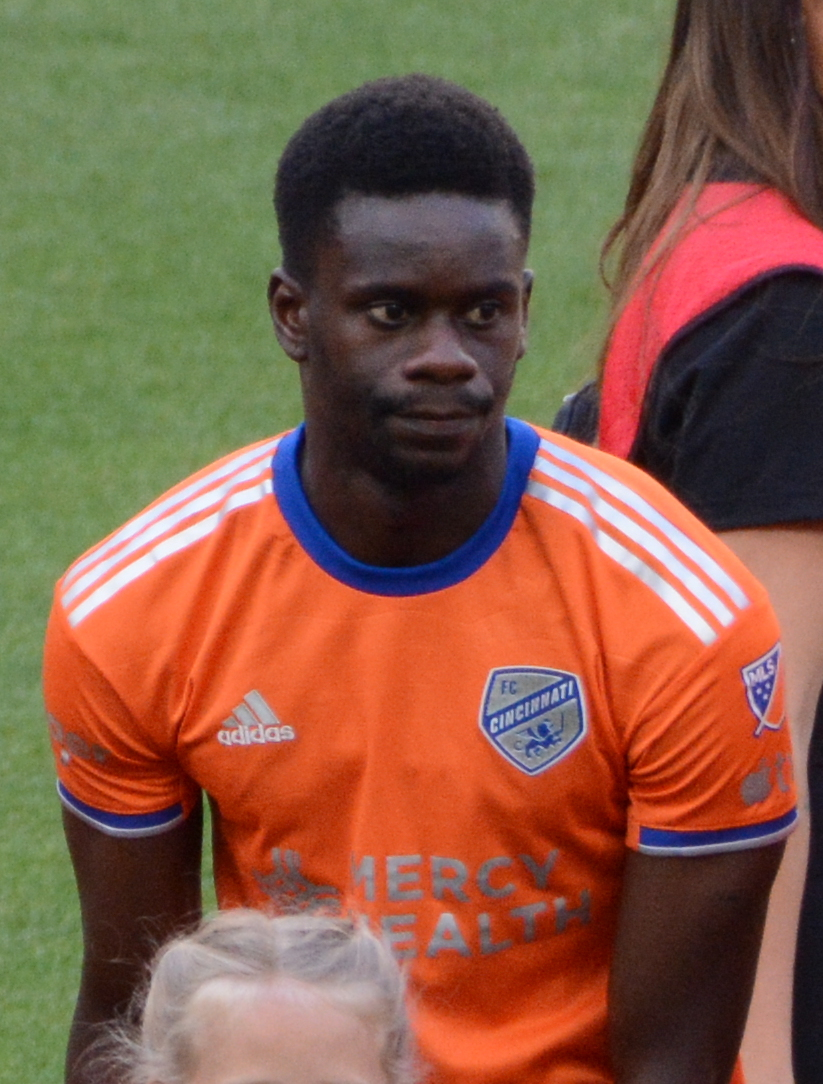
Dominique Badji

Nat.	Player	Pro.	Professional career (teams)
(United States)	Francesco Montali	2023	San Jose Earthquakes
(Brazil)	Felix De Bona	2016	Ekenäs IF, Jaro
(Senegal)	Dominique Badji	2014	Colorado Rapids, Dallas, Nashville
(Colombia)	Michael Bustamante	2012	New York Red Bulls, Charlotte Independence
(England)	Richy Dorman	2011	Broughton United, Kraft
(Ghana)	Samuel Appiah	2010	Houston Dynamo, Pittsburgh Riverhounds
(Iceland)	Jon Jonsson	2009	FH Hafnarfjörður
(United States)	Jarryd Goldberg	2007	Miami
(United States)	Neil Hlavaty	2007	Cleveland City Stars, Östers, Minnesota Stars, Edmonton
(United States)	Zach Kirby	2007	Atlanta Silverbacks, Miami
(United States)	Federico Bianchi	2005	Long Island Rough Riders, California Victory, Hollywood United Hitmen
(Australia)	Jamie Johnson	2005	Brisbane Roar, Brisbane Strikers
(Wales)	Andy Dorman	2003	New England Revolution, St. Mirren, Crystal Palace
(United States)	Kirk Miller	2001	Minnesota Thunder
(Norway)	Ola Olsen	1997	Lyn
(Norway)	Christian Steen	1997	Lyn
(Republic of Ireland)	Robert Forde	1996	Galway United, Shammrock Rovers
(Nigeria)	Okereke Emesih	1995	n/a (Note: The UB Soccer Record Book indicates he played at Belgian Second Division, but without specifying any club.)
(Norway)	Gisle Sorli	1995	Lyn
(United States)	Steve Walker	1994	Newcastle United (reserves)
(Belgium)	Peter Verplancke	1991	n/a
(Nigeria)	Michael Emenalo	1990	San Jose Clash, Maccabi Tel Aviv
(Nigeria)	Ben Okaroh (Note: Member of the BU Hall of Fame.)	1989	KSCT Menen (Note: Club of the Belgian Second Division.)
(Nigeria)	Francis Okaroh	1987	New England Revolution, Chicago Fire
(Republic of Ireland)	Johnny Glynn	1986	Galway United, Cork City
(Venezuela)	Cheche Vidal	1984	Deportivo Italia

== Coaches ==
=== Current staff ===
Position	Name
Head coach	Kevin Nylen
Assoc. head coach	Patrick Lopez
Assist. coach	Joe Blasetti
Assist. coach	Jack Hallahan

=== Coaching history ===
#	Name	Tenure	Seasons	Record	Pct.
1	John Anderson	1949–1965	17	51–89–9	.372
2	Roy Sigler	1966–1973	8	48–47–11	.505
3	Ron Cervasio	1974–1980	7	64–42–13	.592
4	Hank Steinbrecher	1981–1984	4	29–32–13	.480
5	Neil Roberts	1985–2019	35	367–218–93	.610
6	Kevin Nylen	2020–pres.	5	27–24–25	.520

== Titles ==
=== Conference ===
Conference	Championship	Titles	Winning years
Greater Boston League	Regular season	1	1979
America East	Tournament	7	1993, 1994, 1995, 1996, 1997, 2004, 2008
America East	Regular season	10	1990, 1991, 1992, 1993, 1994, 2001, 2004, 2008, 2010, 2011
Patriot League	Tournament	1	2023
Patriot League	Regular season	3	2014, 2023, 2024

== Team statistics ==
=== NCAA appearances ===
UB's appearances in NCAA tournaments (NCAA D-I tournament are listed below:

Key

- a.e.t. – Match went to extra time
- p – Match decided by a penalty shootout after extra time

Season	Stage	Rival	Res.	Score
1980	First round	UConn	L	0–6
1985	First round	UConn	W	2–1 (a.e.t.)
1985	Second round	Hartwick	L	0–1
1986	First round	Harvard	L	1–2
1988	First round	UConn	W	3–1
1988	Second round	Indiana	L	1–3
1990	First round	Boston College	W	3–2
1990	Second round	Evansville	L	0–1 (a.e.t.)
1991	First round	Yale	L	2–3
1993	First round	St. John's (NY)	W	2–1
1993	Second round	Hartwick	L	1–2 (a.e.t.)
1994	First round	Harvard	W	2–0
1994	Second round	Brown	L	2–3

Season	Stage	Rival	Res.	Score
1995	First round	Brown	L	1–2
1996	First round	Harvard	L	2–3
1997	First round	Dartmouth	L	1–5
2004	First round	Dartmouth	W	2–2 (4–3 p)
2004	Second round	St. John's	L	1–3
2007	First round	UMass	L	1–2
2008	First round	Fairleigh Dickinson	W	1–0
2008	Second round	St. John's	L	0–1
2015	First round	UConn	L	1–3
2023	First round	Syracuse	L	1–3
