= Navy Midshipmen men's soccer =

United States Naval Academy NCAA Division 1 soccer team

- Founded: 1921; 105 years ago
- University: United States Naval Academy
- Head coach: John Hackworth (1st season)
- Conference: Patriot
- Location: Annapolis, Maryland, US
- Stadium: Glenn Warner Soccer Facility (capacity: 2,500)
- Nickname: Mids, Midshipmen
- Colors: Navy blue and gold
Home	Away

Pre-tournament ISFA/ISFL championships
- 1932, 1943, 1944, 1945

NCAA tournament championships
- 1964

NCAA tournament runner-up
- 1963

NCAA tournament College Cup
- 1963, 1964, 1965, 1967

NCAA tournament Quarterfinals
- 1963, 1964, 1965, 1966

NCAA tournament Round of 16
- 1963, 1964, 1965, 1970, 1971

NCAA tournament appearances
- 1963, 1964, 1965, 1966, 1967, 1969, 1970, 1971, 1974, 1988, 2013, 2022

The Navy Midshipmen men's soccer team represents the United States Naval Academy in National Collegiate Athletic Association (NCAA) Division I men's soccer. Navy competes as a member of the Patriot League. It used to play its home games at Navy–Marine Corps Memorial Stadium, but now plays them at Glenn Warner Soccer Facility.

== History ==
The team began play in 1921 and has competed for the NCAA Men's Division I Soccer Championship since the tournament began in 1959. Since 1921, the Midshipmen have acquired a total of 595 wins, 330 losses, and 119 draws.

=== Pre-NCAA ===
Before the NCAA began its tournament in 1959, the Intercollegiate Soccer Football Association (ISFA) declared the annual national champion, from 1927 to 1958. Navy was national co-champion in 1932, with the University of Pennsylvania.

=== The Glenn Warner years ===
What are considered the golden years of Navy Soccer lasted under the tenure of Coach Glenn Warner, who acted as head coach of the squad for 30 years. In those 30 years, Coach Warner guided the Midshipmen to nine NCAA Tournament appearances, four Final Four appearances, one national championship, 28 winning seasons and a record of 243–65–31.

The six most successful years of Navy Soccer took place between 1962 and 1967, wherein the team qualified six consecutive times for the NCAA Tournament. In 1962, the squad was eliminated in the first round, only to improve the next year to second place, after losing to St. Louis, 3–0, in the final. In 1964, however, they captured the championship, this time beating Michigan State in the final match, 1–0. This would mark the only NCAA Soccer Title in the academy's history.

In 1965, the squad fell to fourth place in the tournament and were knocked out in the quarterfinals, the following year. They again achieved third place in 1966, after losing to St. Louis, 1–0, in the semi-final. The Mids would return to the Tournament three more times with Glenn Warner, but would never come close to recapturing the title. After Glenn Warner's resignation, the academy qualified for the Tournament in 1988, this being the only time the squad would qualify for the finals without Glenn Warner as coach.

=== The Patriot League ===
Since the initiation of the Patriot League's soccer program in 1990, Navy has reached the final match three times: 1995, 1996, and 1999.

The academy's athletic department completed the construction of $4.5 million soccer facility. The 16,300-square-foot (1,510 m^{2}) facility is named after Navy's legendary Men's coach, Glenn Warner.

In 2018, Jacob Williams was only the second Midshipman to gain the Patriot League 'Rookie of the Year' honor. Williams notched 8 goals in his first season with the program.

== Players ==
=== Current roster ===
As of 20 Sep 2024

Note: Flags indicate national team as defined under FIFA eligibility rules; some limited exceptions apply. Players may hold more than one non-FIFA nationality.

No.	Pos.	Nation	Player
0	GK	USA	Dylan Carmody
1	GK	USA	Robert Eaton
2	DF	USA	Keane Brown
3	DF	USA	Rowan Browne
4	FW	USA	Andrew Schug
5	DF	USA	Kenny Namango
6	DF	USA	Jalen Grant
8	MF	USA	Jorge Mayorga
9	FW	USA	Wyatt Stevens
10	MF	USA	Stephen Nelson
11	MF	USA	Ben Leisegang
12	DF	USA	Charlie Kriel
13	FW	USA	Noah Ward

No.	Pos.	Nation	Player
14	MF	USA	Duncan Sullivan
15	MF	USA	Nate Stewart
16	MF	USA	Tommy Lockhart
17	DF	USA	Alex Galloway
18	DF	USA	JP Torres
19	DF	USA	Victor Saade
21	FW	USA	Liam Plum
22	MF	USA	Connor Walcott
23	FW	USA	A.J. Schuetz
26	DF	USA	Will Boyd
28	MF	USA	Wasswa Robbins
29	GK	USA	Nate Van Zoeren
30	GK	USA	Pierce Holbrook

== Coaches ==
As of 24 Oct 2026

Position	Name
Head coach	John Hackworth
Associate head coach	Mark Risbridger
Assistant coach	Brooks Wilson
Assistant coach	Brent Boone

== Anders Hall of Honor ==
The Anders Hall of Honor — located in the Glenn Warner Soccer Facility — contains thirteen trophy cases and display areas that honor past soccer-team members who have distinguished themselves in soccer, the military, or civilian life.

The hall was given its name to commemorate retired Maj. General William A. Anders and family, who helped finance it.

=== Athletic Hall of Fame ===
The Athletic Hall of Fame is located in Lejeune Hall. For soccer players in the USNA Athletic Hall of Fame, see footnote

== Statistics ==
=== NCAA Division I tournament ===
Participations of Navy at the NCAA tournament detailed below:

Year	Stage	Rival	Score
1963	Runners-up	Saint Louis	0–3
1964	Champions	Michigan State	1–0
1965	Semifinals	St. Louis	1–3
1966	Quarterfinals	Army	1–3
1967	Semifinals	St. Louis	0–1
1988	First Round	Philadelphia	0–1
2013	Second Round	Wake Forest	1–2
2022	First Round	Georgetown	1–2

=== Patriot League tournament ===
Statistics in the tournament:

Year	Result
1991	Third Place
1992	Fourth Place
1995	Runners-up
1996	Runner Up
1997	Fourth Place
1999	Runners-up
2001	Fourth Place
2011	Semi-Finals
2013	Champions
2022	Champions

== Titles ==
=== National ===
- NCAA Division I tournament (1): 1964
- Intercollegiate Soccer Football Association (3): 1932, 1943, 1944

=== Conference ===
- Patriot League tournament (2): 2013, 2022

== See also ==
- Army–Navy Cup, the annual rivalry match against the Army Black Knights men's soccer program
