= Colgate Raiders =

Colgate University athletic teams

- University: Colgate University
- Conference: Patriot League (primary); ECAC Hockey
- NCAA: Division I (FCS)
- Athletic director: Yariv Amir
- Location: Hamilton, New York
- Varsity teams: 23
- Football stadium: Crown Field at Andy Kerr Stadium
- Basketball arena: Cotterell Court
- Softball stadium: Eaton Street Softball Complex
- Volleyball arena: Cotterell Court
- Other venues: Class of 1965 Arena
- Nickname: Raiders
- Colors: Maroon and white
- Website: colgateathletics.com

The Colgate Raiders are the athletic teams that represent Colgate University. The teams include men and women's basketball, cross country, ice hockey, lacrosse, rowing, soccer, swimming & diving, track and field and tennis. Men's sports include golf and football. Women's sports include field hockey, softball, and volleyball.

The Raiders are members of the Patriot League for most sports, except for the men's and women's ice hockey teams, which compete in ECAC Hockey. Colgate is part of NCAA Division I for all varsity sports.

Approximately 25% of students are involved in a varsity sport, and 80% of students are involved in some form of varsity, club, or intramural athletics. There are 25 varsity teams, over 30 club sports teams, and 18 different intramural sports.

== History ==
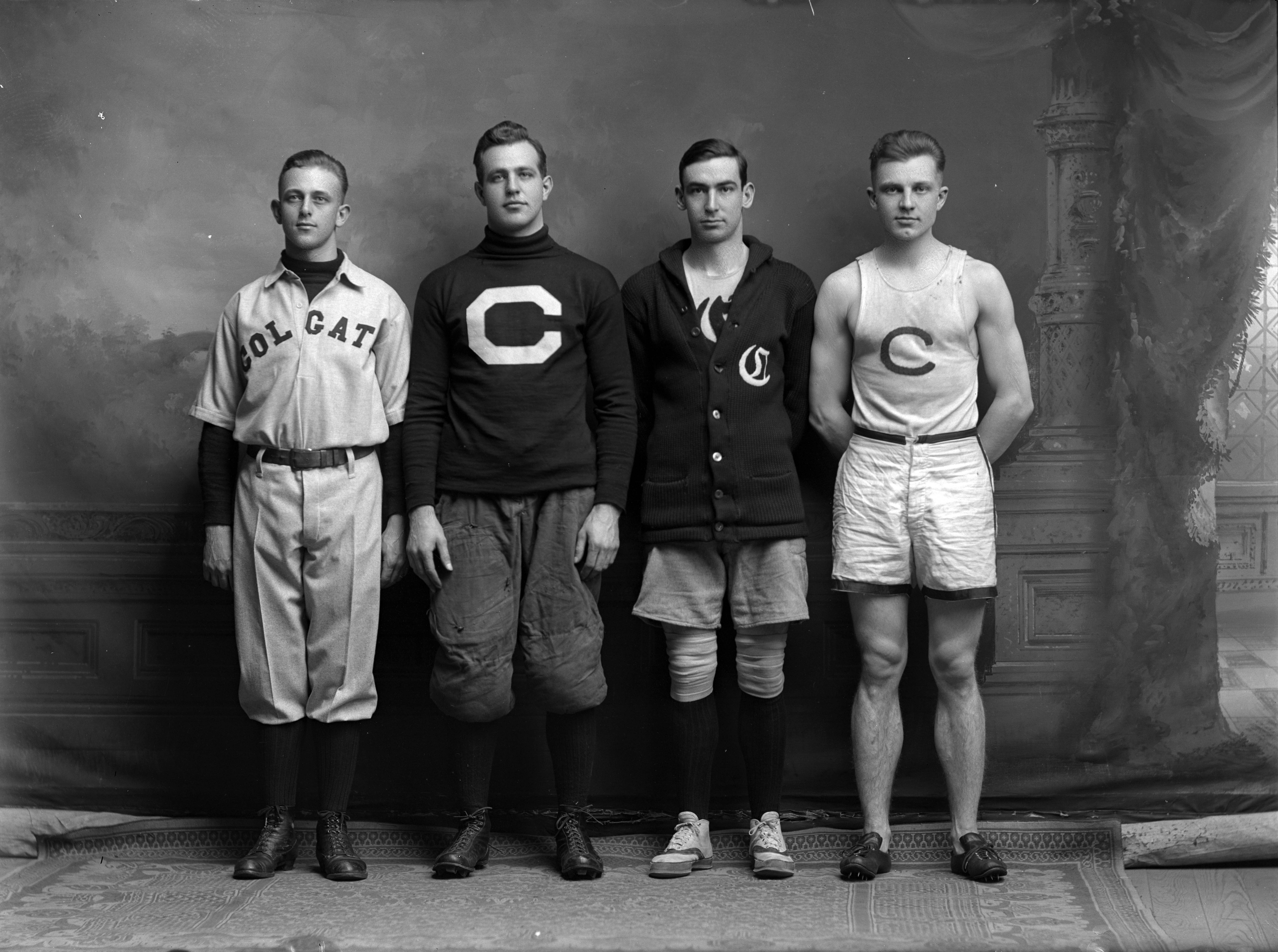
The captains of the Colgate athletics teams c. 1907

Starting in 1932, Colgate athletics teams were called the "Red Raiders" in reference to the new maroon uniforms of that season's "undefeated, untied, unscored upon, and uninvited" football team, which was the first to use the moniker. Apocryphal explanations for the name include the team's ability to defeat its much larger rival, the Cornell University Big Red, or that a rainstorm caused one Colgate football team's maroon jerseys to blend into a reddish color. Regardless, after the adoption of a Native American mascot, the school debated changing the name and mascot in the 1970s out of sensitivity to Native Americans. At that time the nickname was retained, but the mascot was changed to a hand holding a torch. In 2001, the administration acknowledged concerns that the adjective "Red" still had a Native American implication, and the school shortened the nickname to the "Raiders" starting in the 2001–02 school year. A new mascot was introduced in 2006.

Colgate University's football team was selected to share the 1932 national championship by Parke H. Davis in 1933 and appeared in the Associated Press top-level polls in 1942 and 1977. The 1932 team was "unbeaten, untied, unscored upon, and uninvited", as it registered shutouts against all nine opponents, but was not invited to the 1933 Rose Bowl. Colgate began playing in NCAA Division I-AA, now known as Division I FCS, in 1982 and made the Division I-AA (now FCS) football playoffs in 1982, 1983, 1997, 1998, 1999, 2003, and 2005.

In the 2003 season, the Raiders made it to the NCAA I-AA championship game in football for the first time, where they lost to the University of Delaware. At the end of the season, their record was 15–1. At the time, they had the longest winning streak in all of Division I football, including one win over a Division I-A (now Division I FBS) team, Buffalo.

== Teams ==
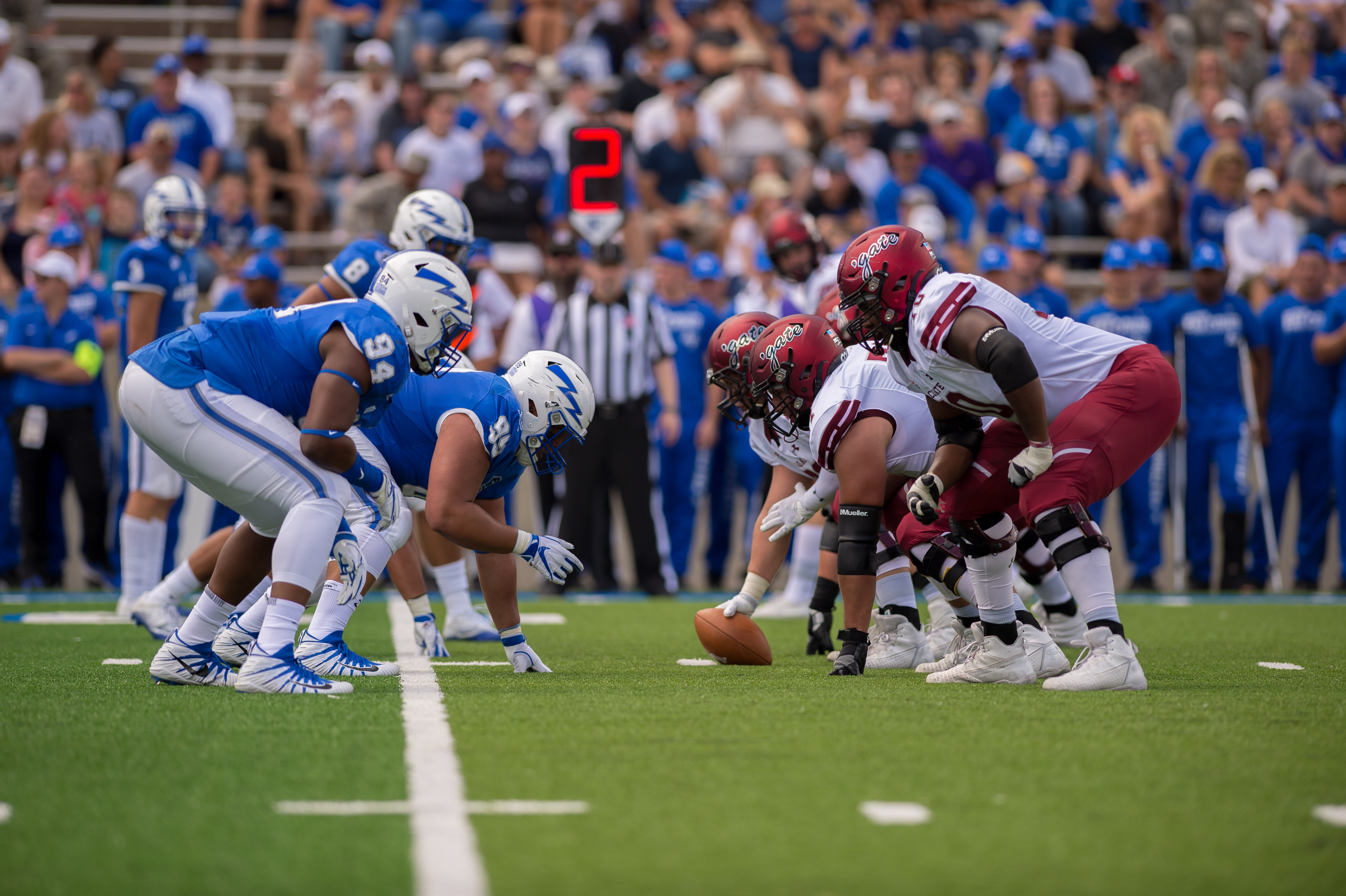
Colgate vs. Air Force, football

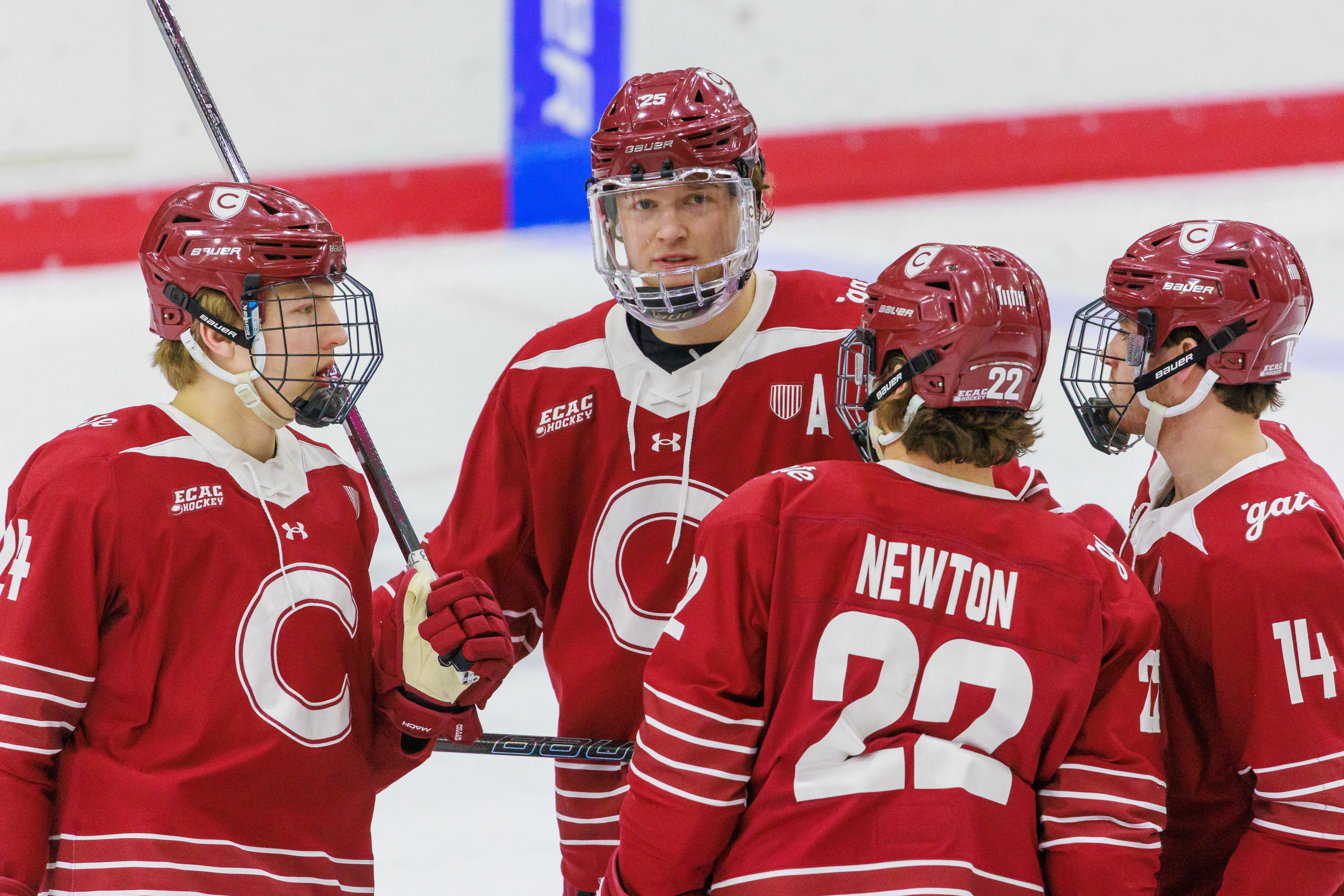
Colgate hockey players in 2025

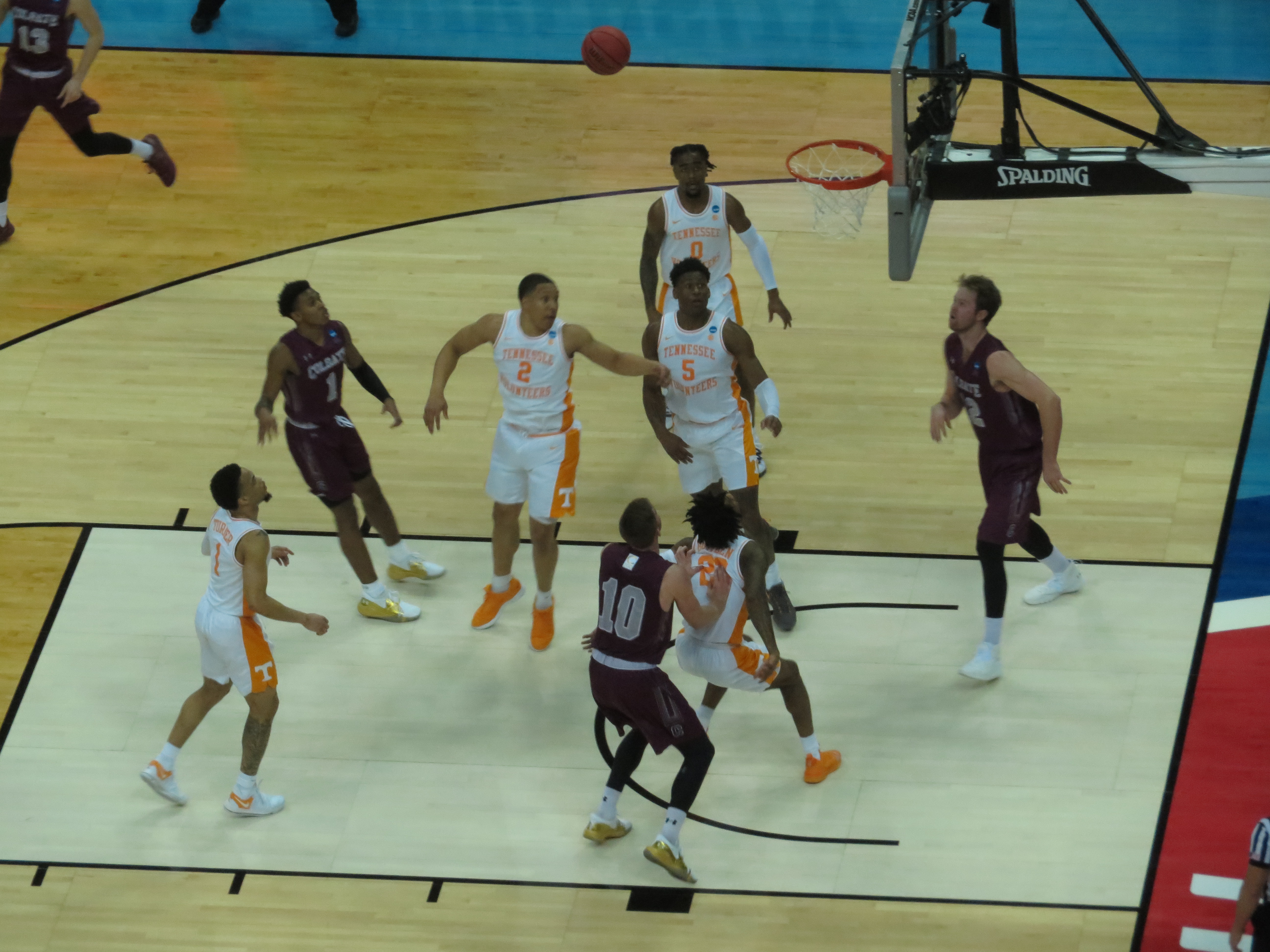
Colgate vs Tennessee, basketball

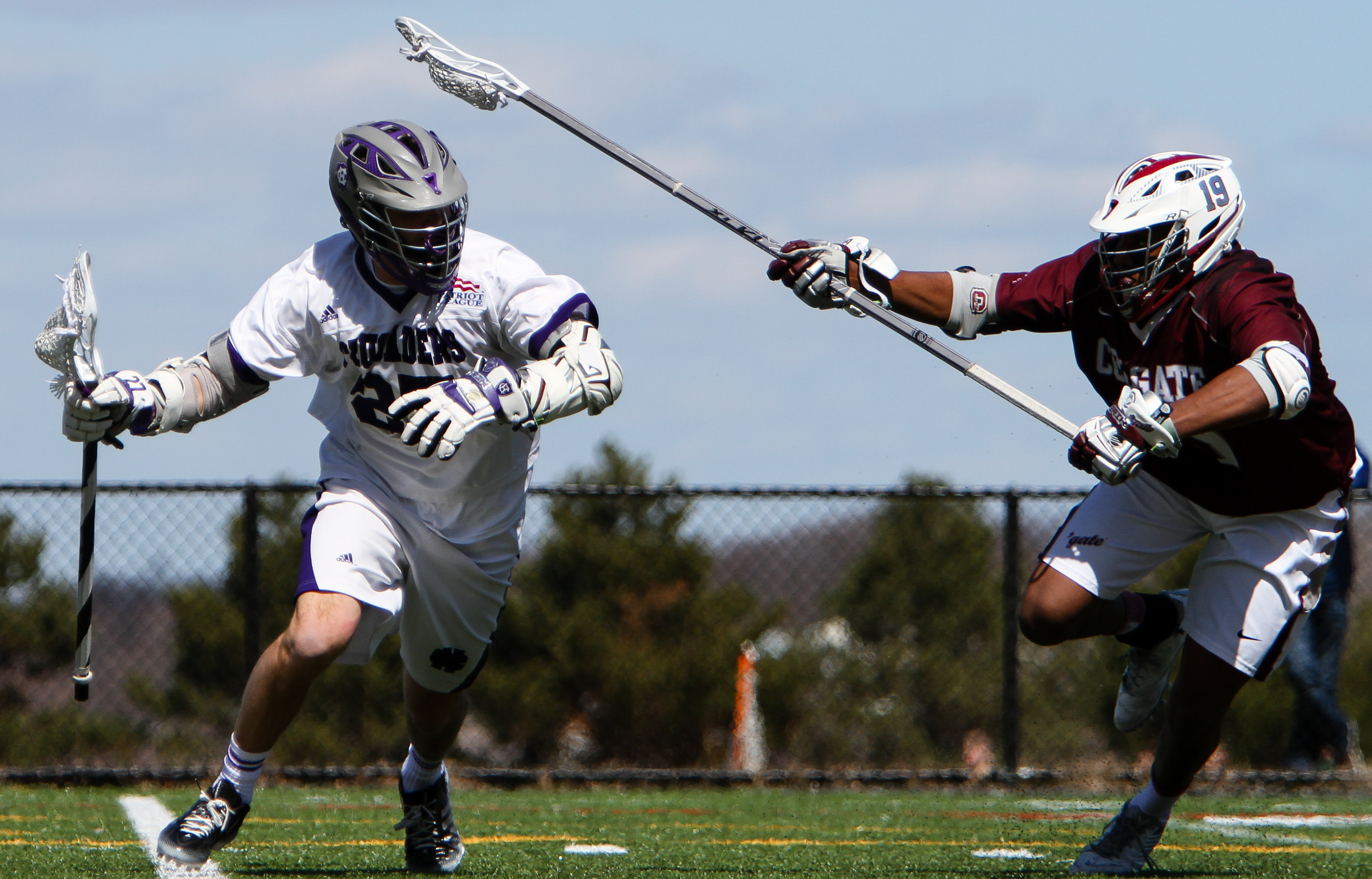
Colgate vs Holy Cross, lacrosse

Men's sports	Women's sports
Basketball	Basketball
Cross Country	Cross Country
Football	Field Hockey
Golf	Ice Hockey
Ice Hockey	Lacrosse
Lacrosse	Rowing
Rowing	Soccer
Soccer	Softball
Swimming	Swimming
Tennis	Tennis
Track and field^{1}	Track and field^{1}
	Volleyball
^{1} – includes both indoor and outdoor.

== Former sports ==
- Baseball (1886–1996)
- Wrestling (1930s–1982)

== Rivalries ==
Cornell is a common rival in all sports; hockey games against Cornell are major events on campus, with students lining up for hours before the game in order to secure tickets. Colgate's teams (with the exception of football, golf, and men's hockey) also compete annually against Syracuse University. Cornell and Syracuse are both within two hours of Colgate's campus. Colgate and Syracuse were once bitter rivals in football (there are some old traditions related to their games), but a variety of factors, including the splitting of Division I football into Division I FBS and Division I FCS in the late 1970s, helped end the annual game, with some exceptions (such as 2010) over the years.
