= Bucknell Bison men's soccer =

Collegiate men's soccer team of Bucknell University

- Founded: 1929; 97 years ago
- University: Bucknell University
- Head coach: Dave Brandt (2nd season)
- Conference: Patriot League
- Location: Lewisburg, Pennsylvania, US
- Stadium: Emmitt Field at Holmes Stadium (capacity: 1,250)
- Nickname: Bison
- Colors: Blue and orange
| Home | Away |

NCAA tournament appearances
- 1974, 1975, 1976, 2006, 2009, 2010, 2014, 2024

Conference tournament championships
- 2006, 2009, 2010, 2014, 2024

Conference regular season championships
- 1949, 1973, 1974, 1975, 1976, 1990, 2000, 2003, 2009

The Bucknell Bison men's soccer team is an intercollegiate varsity sports team of Bucknell University in Lewisburg, Pennsylvania. They are an NCAA Division I team and member of the Patriot League.

Through its history, Bucknell has played in the Middle Atlantic Conference (1947–73), East Coast Conference (1974–89) and Patriot League (1990-pres.). Bucknell has won all four of its Patriot League titles since 2006 and in doing so has been one of the most successful Patriot League teams in that time.

The Bison are currently coached by Dave Brandt.

== NCAA Tournament ==
Bucknell has made seven appearances in the NCAA Division I Men's Soccer Championships. The Bison have advanced to the second round three times by defeating Penn State in 1974, George Mason in 2006 and Princeton in 2009.

== Players ==
=== Current roster ===
As of September 20, 2024

Note: Flags indicate national team as defined under FIFA eligibility rules; some limited exceptions apply. Players may hold more than one non-FIFA nationality.

| No. | Pos. | Nation | Player |
|---|---|---|---|
| 00 | GK | ENG | Freddie Lapworth |
| 0 | GK | USA | Rex Alphen |
| 1 | GK | USA | Andrew Blodgett |
| 2 | FW | USA | Cade McGrath |
| 3 | FW | USA | Drew Roskos |
| 4 | MF | USA | Gianluca Marroni |
| 5 | MF | USA | Matt McLeod |
| 6 | MF | USA | Jimmy Pombor |
| 7 | FW | USA | Zane Domsohn |
| 8 | MF | DEN | Waldemar Kattrup |
| 9 | MF | USA | Jack Roberto |
| 10 | FW | USA | Kasper Piela |
| 11 | FW | USA | Jack Lucas |
| 12 | DF | USA | Collin Sullivan |

| No. | Pos. | Nation | Player |
|---|---|---|---|
| 13 | MF | USA | Noah Handzel |
| 14 | FW | USA | Charlie Sorensen |
| 15 | MF | USA | David Krumov |
| 16 | DF | USA | Ben Sheffield |
| 17 | FW | USA | Jakub Samelko |
| 18 | DF | USA | Jackson Sullivan |
| 19 | MF | USA | Cohen Weaver |
| 20 | DF | USA | Winston Oziri |
| 21 | MF | USA | Cade Whitmire |
| 22 | DF | USA | Aidan Lawlor |
| 23 | DF | USA | Jack Heintz |
| 24 | FW | USA | Nick Prime |
| 25 | MF | USA | Kiko Hidalgo |
| 26 | FW | USA | Mason Lillis |

=== All-American Awards ===
==== NSCAA All-American ====
- 1960 Lyman Ott
- 1960 Bob Schad
- 1976 Scott Strasburg
- 2009 Conor O'Brien
- 2013 Mayowa Alli

==== NSCAA Scholar All-America Team ====
- 2004 Adam Edwards
- 2011, 2012 Brendan Burgdorf
- 2014 Jesse Klug
- 2014 Chris Thorsheim

==== Academic All-American ====
- 1994, 1995 Greg Beatty
- 2001 Ryan Weber
- 2003, 2004 Jonathan Hemmert
- 2008 Chris Hennings
- 2009 Patrick Selwood
- 2012, 2013 Joe Meyer
- 2014, 2015 Jesse Klug
- 2020 Matt Thorsheim

=== Patriot League Awards ===
==== PL Offensive Player of the Year ====
- 2003 Scott Visnic
- 2008, 2009 Conor O'Brien
- 2010 Brendan Burgdorf

==== PL Defensive Player of the Year ====
- 2000 Bill Epley
- 2003, 2004 Michael Lookingland
- 2005 Tim Faneck

==== PL Goalkeeper of the Year ====
- 2005 Adam Edwards
- 2007 Joey Kuterbach

==== PL Rookie of the Year ====
- 2002 Adam Edwards
- 2006 Nathan LaGrave
- 2010 Mayowa Alli

==== PL Tournament MVP ====
- 2006 Joey Kuterbach
- 2009 Patrick Selwood
- 2010 Ross Liberati
- 2014 Sebastiaan Blickman

==== PL Scholar-Athlete of the Year ====
- 1993, 1994 Greg Beatty
- 2003, 2004 Jonathan Hemmert
- 2015 Jesse Klug
- 2016 Zack Rockmore
- 2019, 2020 Matt Thorsheim

== Head coaches ==
=== Current staff ===
As of September 20, 2024

| Position | Name |
|---|---|
| Head coach | Dave Brandt |
| Assistant Coach | Jeremy Payne |
| Assistant Coach | Mark Tun |

=== All-time head coaches ===
Since 1929, Bucknell has had 15 head coaches.

| Years | Coach | P | W | L | D | W % |
|---|---|---|---|---|---|---|
| 1929 | J.B. Hopkins | 2 | 0 | 2 | 0 | 0% |
| 1930 | C.W. Meadowcroft | 5 | 1 | 3 | 1 | 20% |
| 1931 | Charles L. Titus | 5 | 1 | 4 | 0 | 20% |
| 1932 | Ken Vanderbree | 8 | 1 | 6 | 1 | 13% |
| 1933–37 | Joseph Reno | 38 | 12 | 19 | 7 | 32% |
| 1938–44, '46 | M. Edwards | 60 | 17 | 33 | 10 | 28% |
| 1947 | Bill Lane | 10 | 3 | 5 | 2 | 30% |
| 1948–51 | Joseph Diblin | 33 | 16 | 17 | 0 | 48% |
| 1952–62, '64 | Hank Peters | 113 | 45 | 60 | 8 | 40% |
| 1963 | Bill Gold | 11 | 2 | 9 | 0 | 18% |
| 1965–66 | Kirk Randall | 25 | 4 | 18 | 3 | 16% |
| 1967–98 | Craig Reynolds | 487 | 238 | 211 | 38 | 49% |
| 1999–2021 | Brendan Nash | 420 | 187 | 169 | 64 | 45% |
| 2021 (Interim) | Matt Brown | 17 | 4 | 10 | 3 | 24% |
| 2022-Pres. | Dave Brandt | 33 | 5 | 22 | 6 | 15% |

- No games were played in 1945

=== PL Coach of the Year ===
- 1993 Craig Reynolds
- 2000, 2003, 2009 Brendan Nash

== Stadium ==
Emmitt Field at Holmes Stadium hosts games for Bucknell's men's and women's soccer teams. Located on campus, the natural grass pitch was completed in 2005 with the remainder of the lighted stadium and grandstand finished in 2007.

The stadium has an official seating capacity of 1,250 with additional seating on the grass hill behind the north endline. The pitch surface is sand-based Kentucky Blue grass and is 120 by 75 yards.

The field was dedicated as Bison Varsity Soccer Field on September 16, 2005, prior to Bucknell's 3-2 women's soccer victory over Marist. It has since played host to the Patriot League Men's Soccer Tournament in 2009 and the Patriot League women's soccer tournament in 2006, 2007 and 2016.

Holmes Stadium is named to honor the donation from Stephen P. Holmes '79, Chairman and CEO of Wyndham Worldwide and also includes Graham Field (field hockey and women's lacrosse). Emmitt Field was rededicated as such in 2008 in honor of lead donor Richard Emmitt '67, General Partner at The Vertical Group.
