= 2021 NCAA Men's Soccer All-Americans =

An All-American team is an honorary sports team composed of the best amateur players of a specific season for each team position—who in turn are given the honorific "All-America" and typically referred to as "All-American athletes", or simply "All-Americans". Although the honorees generally do not compete together as a unit, the term is used in U.S. team sports to refer to players who are selected by members of the national media. Walter Camp selected the first All-America team in the early days of American football in 1889. The 2021 NCAA Men's Soccer All-Americans are honorary lists that include All-American selections from the United Soccer Coaches (USC), Top Drawer Soccer (TDS), Soccer America (TSN), and College Soccer News for the 2021 NCAA Division I men's soccer season. All selectors choose at least a first, second, and third 11-man team.

Although the aforementioned lists are used to determine consensus honors, there are numerous other All-American lists. The three finalists for the Hermann Trophy are described as Hermann All-Americans. The ten finalists for the Senior CLASS Award are described as Senior All-Americans. Other All-American lists include those determined by Hero Sports and many others. The scholar-athletes selected by College Sports Information Directors of America (CoSIDA) are termed Academic All-Americans.

The lists of All-Americans were released in December 2021 and January 2022.

== Individual All-America teams ==
=== By player ===
This list is of players who were named first-team All-Americans by each respective publication.

Key

CSN	College Soccer News
TDS	Top Drawer Soccer
USC	United Soccer Coaches
*	Consensus All-American (selected by all selectors)
†	Awarded the Hermann Trophy as national Player of the Year

List

Position	Name	School	CSN	TDS	USC	Notes
Forward	Dylan Teves*	Washington	✓	✓	✓	
Forward	Thorleifur Úlfarsson	Duke	✓	✗	✓	ACC Offensive Player of the Year
Forward	Simon Becher*	Saint Louis	✓	✓	✓	A10 Offensive Player of the Year
Midfielder	Sofiane Djeffal*	Oregon State	✓	✓	✓	Pac-12 Player of the Year
Midfielder	Dante Polvara^{†}	Georgetown	✓	✓	✗	Hermann Trophy winner Big East Defensive Player of the Year
Midfielder	Ben Bender	Maryland	✓	✗	✓	Big Ten Midfielder of the Year; 2022 MLS SuperDraft No. 1 pick
Midfielder	Hendrik Hebbeker	Hofstra	✓	✗	✓	
Defender	Oskar Agren	Clemson	✓	✓	✗	
Defender	Jasper Löffelsend	Pittsburgh	✓	✗	✗	ACC Defensive Player of the Year
Defender	Kyle Hiebert	Missouri State	✓	✗	✓	MVC Defensive Player of the Year
Defender	Ryan Sailor*	Washington	✓	✓	✓	Pac-12 Defensive Player of the Year
Goalkeeper	Jan Hoffelner	Kentucky	✓	✗	✓	C-USA Goalkeeper of the Year
Forward	Alex Meinhard	Tulsa	✗	✓	✗	AAC Offensive Player of the Year
Midfielder	Sean Zawadzki	Georgetown	✗	✓	✓	Big East Defensive Player of the Year
Midfielder	Peter Stroud	Duke	✗	✓	✗	ACC Midfielder of the Year
Midfielder	Yannick Bright	New Hampshire	✗	✗	✓	Am. East Midfielder of the Year
Defender	Adam Savill	New Hampshire	✗	✗	✓	Am. East Defender of the Year
Defender	Philip Quinton	Notre Dame	✗	✓	✗	
Goalkeeper	Roman Celentano	Indiana	✗	✓	✗	Big Ten Golakeeper of the Year

=== By team ===
All-America Team	First team		Second team		Third team	
All-America Team	Player	School	Player	School	Player	School
College Soccer News	(United States) Dylan Teves	Washington	(United States) Diego Gutierrez	Creighton	(United States) Nick Markanich	Northern Illinois
College Soccer News	(Iceland) Thorleifur Ulfarsson	Duke	(United States) Kyle Holcomb	Wake Forest	(United States) Chris Donovan	Drexel
College Soccer News	(United States) Simon Becher	Saint Louis	(France) Theo Collomb	North Carolina-Greensboro	(United States) Peter Mangione	Penn State
College Soccer News	(France) Sofiane Djeffal	Oregon State	(Italy) Yannick Bright	New Hampshire	(United States) Jack Lynn	Notre Dame
College Soccer News	(United States) Dante Polvara	Georgetown	(South Africa) Tyrone Mondi	Oregon State	(United States) Tyler Bagley	Cornell
College Soccer News	(United States) Benjamin Bender	Maryland	(United States) Sean Zawadzki	Georgetown	(United States) John Klein	Saint Louis
College Soccer News	(Germany) Hendrik Hebbeker	Hofstra	(Brazil) Pedro Delabella	Marshall	(United States) Billy Hency	Loyola Chicago
College Soccer News	(Sweden) Oskar Agren	Clemson	(United States) Kevin O'Toole	Princeton	(United States) Peter Stroud	Duke
College Soccer News	(Germany) Jasper Löeffelsend	Pittsburgh	(United States) Daniel Munie	Indiana	(United Kingdom) Adam Savill	New Hampshire
College Soccer News	(Canada) Kyle Hiebert	Missouri State	(United Kingdom) George Proctor	Georgia State	(Spain) Mariano Fazio	Tulsa
College Soccer News	(United States) Ryan Sailor	Washington	(United States) Charlie Ostrem	Washington	(United States) Justin Ingram	Loyola Maryland
College Soccer News	(Germany) Jan Hoffelner	Kentucky	(Canada) Luka Gavran	St. John's	(United States) Kipp Keller	Saint Louis
College Soccer News	—N/a	—N/a	—N/a	—N/a	(United States) Roman Celentano	Indiana
Top Drawer Soccer	(United States) Simon Becher	Saint Louis	(United States) Diego Gutierrez	Creighton	(United States) John Klein	Saint Louis
Top Drawer Soccer	(United States) Dylan Teves	Washington	(United States) Jack Lynn	Notre Dame	(United States) Kyle Holcomb	Wake Forest
Top Drawer Soccer	(Estonia) Alex Meinhard	Tulsa	(Costa Rica) Gino Vivi	VCU	(France) Theo Collomb	North Carolina-Greensboro
Top Drawer Soccer	(United States) Sean Zawadzki	Georgetown	(United States) Benjamin Bender	Maryland	(United States) Nick Markanich	Northern Illinois
Top Drawer Soccer	(France) Sofiane Djeffal	Oregon State	(South Africa) Tyrone Mondi	Oregon State	(Brazil) Pedro Delabella	Marshall
Top Drawer Soccer	(United States) Peter Stroud	Duke	(Italy) Yannick Bright	New Hampshire	(United States) Filip Mirkovic	Pittsburgh
Top Drawer Soccer	(United States) Dante Polvara	Georgetown	(United States) Kevin O'Toole	Princeton	(Portugal) Diogo Pacheco	Akron
Top Drawer Soccer	(United States) Philip Quinton	Notre Dame	(United States) Esai Easley	Grand Canyon	(United States) Will Sands	Georgetown
Top Drawer Soccer	(United States) Ryan Sailor	Washington	(United States) Daniel Munie	Indiana	(Germany) Bjarne Thiesen	West Virginia
Top Drawer Soccer	(Sweden) Oskar Agren	Clemson	(United States) Kipp Keller	Saint Louis	(United Kingdom) Adam Savill	New Hampshire
Top Drawer Soccer	(United States) Roman Celentano	Indiana	(Germany) Jan Hoffelner	Kentucky	(United States) George Marks	Clemson
United Soccer Coaches	(United States) Dylan Teves	Washington	(United States) Diego Gutierrez	Creighton	(United Kingdom) Tola Showunmi	New Hampshire
United Soccer Coaches	(Iceland) Thorleifur Ulfarsson	Duke	(United States) Kyle Holcomb	Wake Forest	(Portugal) Diogo Pacheco	Akron
United Soccer Coaches	(United States) Simon Becher	Saint Louis	(United States) Jack Lynn	Notre Dame	(United States) Kevin O'Toole	Princeton
United Soccer Coaches	(United States) Sean Zawadzki	Georgetown	(France) Theo Collomb	North Carolina-Greensboro	(United Kingdom) Josh Dolling	Missouri State
United Soccer Coaches	(France) Sofiane Djeffal	Oregon State	(United Kingdom) Kian Yari	Missouri State	(United States) Peter Stroud	Duke
United Soccer Coaches	(Italy) Yannick Bright	New Hampshire	(United States) Dante Polvara	Georgetown	(South Africa) Tyrone Mondi	Oregon State
United Soccer Coaches	(United States) Benjamin Bender	Maryland	(Germany) Hendrik Hebbeker	Hofstra	(Brazil) Vitor Dias	Marshall
United Soccer Coaches	(United Kingdom) Adam Savill	New Hampshire	(Brazil) Pedro Delabella	Marshall	(Germany) Bjarne Thiesen	West Virginia
United Soccer Coaches	(United States) Ryan Sailor	Washington	(Germany) Jasper Löeffelsend	Pittsburgh	(United States) Will Sands	Georgetown
United Soccer Coaches	(Canada) Kyle Hiebert	Missouri State	(United States) Kipp Keller	Saint Louis	(United States) Daniel Munie	Indiana
United Soccer Coaches	(Germany) Jan Hoffelner	Kentucky	(Sweden) Oskar Agren	Clemson	(Spain) Mariano Fazio	Tulsa
United Soccer Coaches	—N/a	—N/a	(United States) Roman Celentano	Indiana	(Canada) Luka Gavran	St. John's

== Academic All-Americans ==
CoSIDA names three Academic All-American teams for the 2021 season. The teams were announced in December 2021 and January 2022.

First team		Second team		Third team	
Player	School	Player	School	Player	School

== Senior All-Americans ==
The 10 finalists for the Senior CLASS Award are considered Senior All-Americans.

Player	Position	School
Noah Jensen	Midfielder	Oakland
Matthew Fearnley	Midfielder	Georgia State
Spencer Glass	Defender	Indiana
Kyle Hiebert	Defender	Missouri State
Sean Zawadzki	Defender	Georgetown
Vitor Dias	Midfielder	Marshall
Pedro Dolabella	Midfielder	Marshall
Billy Hency	Midfielder	Loyola Chicago
Matt Nocita	Defender	Navy
Pierre Reedy	Midfielder	Penn State

== Freshman All-Americans ==
All-America Team	First team		Second team		Third team	
All-America Team	Player	School	Player	School	Player	School
