= 2021 NCAA Division I men's soccer championship game =

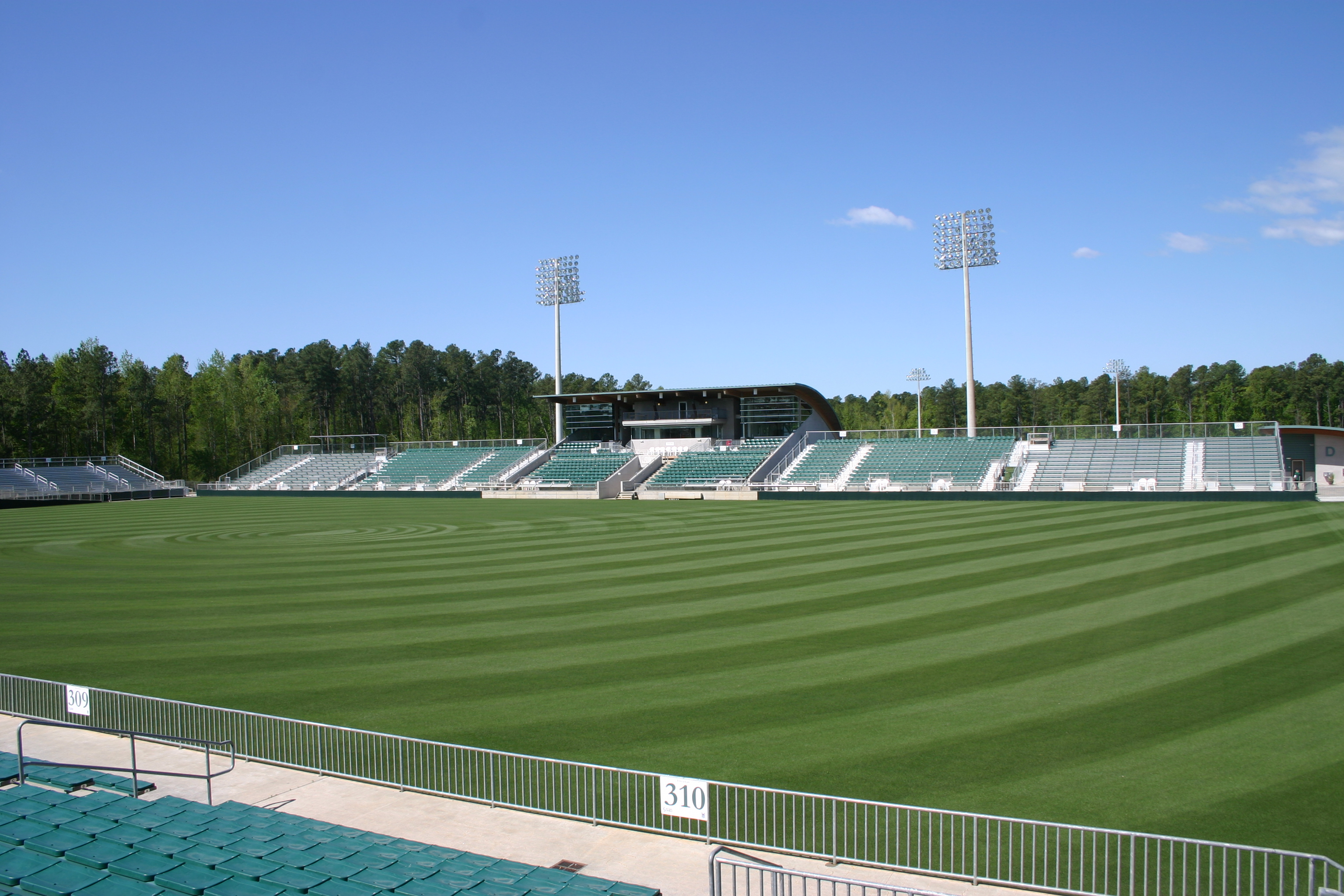
- WakeMed Soccer Park hosted the final
- Event: 2021 NCAA Division I Men's Soccer Tournament
Clemson	Washington
ACC	Pac-12
2	0
- Date: December 12, 2021
- Venue: WakeMed Soccer Park, Cary, North Carolina, U.S.
- Man of the Match: George Marks; Isiah Reid
- Referee: Daniel Radford
- Attendance: 7,238
- Weather: Sunny, 51 °F (11 °C)

The 2021 NCAA Division I men's soccer championship game (also known as the 2021 NCAA Division I Men's College Cup) was played on December 12, 2021, at WakeMed Soccer Park in Cary, North Carolina and determined the winner of the 2021 NCAA Division I Men's Soccer Tournament, the national collegiate soccer championship in the United States. This was the 63rd edition of the oldest active competition in United States college soccer.

The tournament returned to its traditional mid-December date after being held in the spring the previous year due to the COVID-19 pandemic.

The match featured Clemson University of the Atlantic Coast Conference (ACC) and the University of Washington of the Pac-12 Conference. It was Clemson's fifth appearance in the final, and their first since 2015. Washington was making their first appearance in the national championship game.

Clemson went on to win the match to win, 2–0, behind two first half goals from Isaiah Reid. The title gave Clemson their first NCAA title in men's soccer since 1987, and their third overall title.

== Road to the final ==
The NCAA Division I Men's Soccer Tournament, sometimes known as the College Cup, is an American intercollegiate soccer tournament conducted by the National Collegiate Athletic Association (NCAA), and determines the Division I men's national champion. The tournament has been formally held since 1959, when it was an eight-team tournament. Since then, the tournament has expanded to 48 teams, in which every Division I conference tournament champion is allocated a berth. It was Clemson's fifth appearance in the final, and their first since 2015. Washington was making their first appearance in the national championship game. Clemson had previously won the NCAA Tournament in 1984 and 1987.

Clemson (ACC)		Round	Washington (Pac-12)	
Opponent	Result	NCAA Tournament	Opponent	Result
Bye	—	First Round	Bye	—
Denver (Summit)	2–1 (H)	Second Round	Portland (WCC)	3–1 (H)
Kentucky (C-USA)	2–1 (H)	Third Round (Sweet 16)	Indiana (Big Ten)	3–2 (H)
Oregon State (Pac-12)	1–1 (A)	Quarterfinals (Elite 8)	Saint Louis (A-10)	2–0 (H)
Notre Dame (ACC)	1–1 (N)	College Cup (Final 4)	Georgetown (Big East)	2–1 (N)

== Match details ==
December 12, 2021
Final

Clemson	2–0	Washington
Reid 1', 15'	Report

WakeMed Soccer Park, Cary
Attendance: 7,238

Clemson
Washington

GK	1	(United States) George Marks
DF	3	(Sweden) Oskar Ågren
DF	15	(United States) Charlie Asensio
DF	4	(Senegal) Justin Malou
DF	5	(Senegal) Hamady Diop
MF	18	(Spain) Alvaro Gomez
MF	8	(United States) Callum Johnson
MF	17	(United States) Quinn McNeill
MF	10	(Ecuador) Luis Fernandez-Salvador
MF	21	(Senegal) Osmane Sylla
FW	27	(United States) Isaiah Reid
Manager:
(United States) Mike Noonan

GK	0	(United States) Sam Fowler
DF	2	(United States) Kendall Burks
DF	20	(United States) Charlie Ostrem
DF	5	(France) Achille Robin
DF	4	(United States) Ryan Sailor
MF	6	(United States) Kalani Kossa-Rienzi
MF	8	(United States) Gio Miglietti
MF	10	(England) James Smith
MF	14	(United States) Christian Soto
FW	9	(United States) Dylan Teves
FW	11	(United States) Nick Scardina
Manager:
(Scotland) Jamie Clark
