= 2022 MLS SuperDraft =

College draft for soccer teams

General information
- Sport: Soccer
- Date: January 11, 2022

Overview
- 79 total selections in 3 rounds
- League: Major League Soccer
- Teams: 28
- First selection: Ben Bender, Charlotte FC
- Most selections: Vancouver Whitecaps FC (5)

The 2022 MLS SuperDraft was the 23rd edition of the SuperDraft conducted by Major League Soccer. The SuperDraft is held every January prior to the start of the MLS season and has been conducted via conference calls since 2020. Previously, the SuperDraft had been held in conjunction with the annual January United Soccer Coaches convention.

Since 2021, the SuperDraft consists of three rounds. Teams that received fourth-round picks for this draft via past trades received compensatory picks instead. Of the 75 players selected in the SuperDraft, 28 were signed by MLS teams—most of them from the first round picks.

== Format ==
The SuperDraft format has remained constant throughout its history and closely resembles that of the NFL draft:

1. Any expansion teams receive the first picks. MLS has announced that Charlotte FC would begin play as an expansion team in 2022. Sacramento Republic and St. Louis City SC were about to debut that year, but MLS delayed St. Louis's start to 2023 instead, and the league's expansion to Sacramento was withheld indefinitely.
2. Non-playoff clubs receive the next picks in reverse order of prior season finish.
3. Teams that made the MLS Cup Playoffs are then ordered by which round of the playoffs they are eliminated.
4. The winners of the MLS Cup are given the last selection, and the losers the penultimate selection.

== Player selection ==
Player key
*	Denotes player who has been selected for an MLS Best XI team						
^	Member of 2022 Generation Adidas class						
†	Player who was named to an MLS Best XI and Generation Adidas						
Signed key
29	Denotes player who signed for a MLS team (Division I)						
16	Denotes player who signed for a USL Championship team (Division II)						
28	Denotes player who signed for a MLS Next Pro, USL League One or NISA team (Division III)						
2	Denotes player who signed for a team outside the United States soccer league system						
Positions key
GK	Goalkeeper	DF	Defender	MF	Midfielder	FW	Forward

=== Round 1 ===
P	MLS team	Player	Pos.	College	Conference	Academy team	Other team	Signed
1	Charlotte FC	(United States) Ben Bender	MF	Maryland	Big Ten	Baltimore Armour	FC Baltimore Christos	(United States) Charlotte FC
2	FC Cincinnati	(United States) Roman Celentano	GK	Indiana	Big Ten	Sockers FC	—N/a	(United States) FC Cincinnati
3	FC Dallas (Note: No. 3: Toronto → Dallas. January 10, 2022: Dallas acquired Toronto FC's first-round selection and Dom Dwyer in exchange for $50,000 in general allocation money and buying out Dwyer's contract.)	(United States) Isaiah Parker	FW	Saint Louis	A-10	FC United	Chicago FC United	(United States) FC Dallas
4	Houston Dynamo	(Iceland) Thorleifur Úlfarsson	FW	Duke	ACC	Breiðablik	—N/a	(United States) Houston Dynamo
5	Austin FC	(United States) Kipp Keller	DF	Saint Louis	A-10	Saint Louis FC	St. Louis Scott Gallagher	(United States) Austin FC
6	FC Dallas	(United States) Lucas Bartlett	DF	St. John's	Big East	Sporting Blue Valley	Kaw Valley FC	(United States) FC Dallas
7	New York Red Bulls (Note: No. 7: Chicago → NY Red Bulls. January 11, 2022: The Red Bulls acquired Chicago's 2022 first-round selection in exchange for $100,000 in general allocation money.)	(United States) Matt Nocita	DF	Naval Academy	Patriot	Real So Cal	—N/a	(United States) New York Red Bulls
8	San Jose Earthquakes	(Burkina Faso) Ousseni Bouda	FW	Stanford	Pac-12	Black Rock FC	Black Rock FC	(United States) San Jose Earthquakes
9	Inter Miami CF	(United States) Ryan Sailor	DF	Washington	Pac-12	Real Colorado	Colorado Rapids U-23	(United States) Inter Miami CF
10	Nashville SC (Note: No. 10: Los Angeles FC → Colorado → Nashville. July 27, 2021: Colorado acquired a 2022 first-round selection and midfielder Mark-Anthony Kaye from Los Angeles FC in exchange for $1 million in 2021 general allocation money and a 2022 international roster slot. On January 11, 2022, Colorado traded the pick to Nashville SC in exchange for general allocation money.)	(United States) Ahmed Longmire	DF	UCLA	Pac-12	Las Vegas Sports Academy	Seattle Sounders FC U-23	(United States) Nashville SC
11	Chicago Fire FC (Note: No. 7: Montréal → NY Red Bulls → Chicago. January 11, 2022: The New York Red Bulls acquired Montréal's 2022 first-round selection in exchange for $100,000 in general allocation money and the Red Bulls traded to Chicago Fire for the same GAM.)	(United States) Kendall Burks	DF	Washington	Pac-12	Washington Premier	Seattle Sounders FC U-23	(United States) Chicago Fire FC
12	Columbus Crew	(United States) Patrick Schulte	GK	Saint Louis	A-10	Saint Louis FC	St. Louis Scott Gallagher	(United States) Columbus Crew
13	San Jose Earthquakes (Note: No. 13: D.C. → San Jose. January 11, 2022: San Jose acquired D.C.'s 2022 first-round selection in exchange for $100,000 in general allocation money.)	(Sweden) Oskar Ågren	DF	Clemson	ACC	LB07	—N/a	(United States) San Jose Earthquakes
14	FC Cincinnati (Note: No. 14: LA Galaxy → Cincinnati. April 8, 2021: Cincinnati acquired a 2022 first-round selection and $250,000 in 2021 general allocation money from the LA Galaxy in exchange for the discovery rights to winger Kévin Cabral.)	(United States) Ian Murphy	DF	Duke	ACC	FC Golden State	—N/a	(United States) FC Cincinnati
15	CF Montréal (Note: No. 15: NY Red Bulls → Montréal. January 11, 2022: Montréal acquired the New York Red Bulls' 2022 first-round selection as part of their earlier first-round trade.)	(Rwanda) Jojea Kwizera	FW	Utah Valley	WAC	Forza West FC	Ogden City SC	(Canada) CF Montréal
16	Vancouver Whitecaps FC	(United States) Simon Becher	FW	Saint Louis	A-10	Oakwood SC	Ocean City Nor'easters	(Canada) Whitecaps FC 2
17	Minnesota United FC	(Canada) Tani Oluwaseyi	FW	St. John's	Big East	GPS Academy	Manhattan SC	(United States) Minnesota United FC
18	Orlando City SC	(United States) Jack Lynn	FW	Notre Dame	ACC	Saint Louis FC	St. Louis Scott Gallagher	(United States) Orlando City SC
19	Atlanta United FC	(United States) Erik Centeno	FW	Pacific	Big West	Sacramento Republic	—N/a	(United States) Atlanta United FC
20	New York Red Bulls (Note: No. 20: Seattle → NY Red Bulls. January 11, 2022: The New York Red Bulls acquired Seattle's 2022 first-round selection in exchange for general allocation money.)	(Canada) O'Vonte Mullings	FW	Florida Gulf Coast	ASUN	FC Durham	Seattle Sounders FC U-23	(United States) New York Red Bulls II
21	LA Galaxy (Note: No. 21: Nashville → LA Galaxy. December 12, 2021: LA Galaxy acquired Nashville's first-round selection in exchange for Ethan Zubak.)	(Zimbabwe) Farai Mutatu	FW	Michigan State	Big Ten	Crew Academy Wolves	Chicago FC United	(Zimbabwe) Dynamos
22	Sporting Kansas City	(United States) Esai Easley	DF	Grand Canyon	WAC	De Anza Force	Portland Timbers U23	(United States) Sporting Kansas City II
23	Colorado Rapids	(Somalia) Mohamed Omar	MF	Notre Dame	ACC	Toronto FC	Chicago FC United	(Canada) HFX Wanderers
24	New England Revolution	(United States) Jacob Jackson	GK	Loyola Marymount	WCC	Real Salt Lake	—N/a	(United States) New England Revolution
25	Columbus Crew (Note: No. 25: Salt Lake → Columbus. January 11, 2022: Columbus acquired Real Salt Lake's first-round selection in exchange for $50,000 in general allocation money.)	(United States) Philip Quinton	DF	Notre Dame	ACC	FC Portland	Portland Timbers U23	(United States) Columbus Crew 2
26	Colorado Rapids (Note: No. 26: Philadelphia → Nashville → Colorado. January 19, 2021: Nashville acquired a 2022 first-round selection and 2021 second- and third-round selections from Philadelphia in exchange for up to $225,000 of general allocation money. On January 11, 2022, the pick was traded to Colorado for general allocation money.)	(United States) Anthony Markanich	DF	Northern Illinois	MAC	Chicago Fire FC	Green Bay Voyageurs	(United States) Colorado Rapids
27	Portland Timbers	(United States) Justin Rasmussen	MF	Grand Canyon	WAC	Las Vegas Sports Academy	Portland Timbers U23	(United States) Portland Timbers
28	FC Dallas (Note: No. 28: NY City FC → Dallas. January 11, 2022: New York City FC traded the pick to FC Dallas in exchange for $50,000 in general allocation money.)	(South Africa) Tsiki Ntsabeleng	FW	Oregon State	Pac-12	Kaizer Chiefs	Reading United	(United States) FC Dallas

=== Round 2 ===
P	MLS team	Player	Pos.	College	Conference	Academy team	Other team	Signed
29	Charlotte FC	(United States) Kyle Holcomb	FW	Wake Forest	ACC	Pateadores FC	Orange County SC U23	(United States) Charleston Battery
30	FC Cincinnati	(United States) Nick Markanich	FW	Northern Illinois	MAC	Chicago Fire FC	Green Bay Voyageurs	(United States) FC Cincinnati
31	Toronto FC	(Canada) Luka Gavran	GK	St. John's	Big East	GPS Academy	Manhattan SC	(Canada) Toronto FC II
32	Houston Dynamo	(Portugal) Paulo Lima	MF	Providence	Big East	Sporting CP	Boston Bolts	(United States) Houston Dynamo 2
33	Chicago Fire FC	(United States) Charlie Ostrem	DF	Washington	Pac-12	Crossfire Premier	Crossfire Redmond	(United States) Chicago Fire FC II
34	New York City FC (Note: No. 34: Dallas → NY City FC. January 11, 2022: NYC FC traded $50,000 in general allocation money to Dallas in exchange for a second-round selection.)	(Republic of Ireland) Kevin O'Toole	FW	Princeton	Ivy League	New York Red Bulls	New York Red Bulls U-23	(United States) New York City FC
35	Austin FC	(United States) Charlie Asensio	DF	Clemson	ACC	Atlanta United FC	—N/a	(United States) Austin FC
36	D.C. United	(France) Sofiane Djeffal	MF	Oregon State	Pac-12	FC Nantes	Portland Timbers U23s	(United States) D.C. United
37	Inter Miami CF	(United States) Lucas Meek	FW	Washington	Pac-12	Seattle Sounders FC	Ballard FC	(United States) Inter Miami II
38	Nashville SC (Note: No. 38: Los Angeles FC → Nashville. February 26, 2020: Nashville acquired a 2022 second-round selection, $350,000 in combined 2020 and 2021 general allocation money, and the No. 24 spot in the MLS Allocation Order from Los Angeles FC in exchange for the No. 1 spot in the Allocation Order. The traded pick was LAFC's natural selection.)	(United States) Will Meyer	GK	Akron	MAC	Cleveland Soccer Academy	Derby City Rovers	(United States) Nashville SC
39	Houston Dynamo	(Spain) Arturo Ordoñez	DF	Pittsburgh	ACC	Gimnàstic	—N/a	(United States) Pittsburgh Riverhounds
40	Columbus Crew	(United States) Jacob Erlandson	DF	Bowling Green	MAC	Ohio Galaxies	Flint City Bucks	(United States) Columbus Crew 2
41	D.C. United	(United States) Alex Nagy	MF	Vermont	America East	New England Revolution	Valeo FC	(United States) Loudoun United
42	LA Galaxy	(United States) Callum Johnson	MF	Clemson	ACC	New York Red Bulls	New York Red Bulls U-23	(United States) LA Galaxy II
43	Seattle Sounders FC	(France) Achille Robin	DF	Washington	Pac-12	Les Herbiers VF	Chicago FC United	(United States) Tacoma Defiance
44	Vancouver Whitecaps FC	(Ecuador) Luis Felipe Fernandez-Salvador	MF	Clemson	ACC	Shattuck St. Mary's	—N/a	(Canada) Whitecaps FC 2
45	Colorado Rapids (Note: No. 45: Minnesota → Colorado. September 19, 2020: Colorado acquired a 2022 second-round selection and $150,000 in 2020 general allocation money from Minnesota in exchange for forward Kei Kamara.)	(El Salvador) Roberto Molina	MF	UC Irvine	Big West	Barça Residency Academy	Las Vegas Lights	(United States) Las Vegas Lights
46	Orlando City SC	(Canada) Nathan Dossantos	DF	Marshall	C-USA	Woodbridge Strikers	FC Florida U23	(United States) Pittsburgh Riverhounds
47	Atlanta United FC	(United States) Tristan Trager	FW	Air Force	WAC	Academy Strikers FC	—N/a	(United States) Atlanta United 2
48	Inter Miami CF	(United States) Justin Ingram	MF	Loyola (MD)	Patriot	Indiana Fire	Flint City Bucks	(United States) Indy Eleven
49	Vancouver Whitecaps FC (Note: No. 49: Nashville → Vancouver. November 26, 2019: Vancouver acquired a 2022 second-round selection and the No. 25 selection in Stage One of the 2019 MLS Re-Entry Draft from Nashville SC in exchange for the No. 2 selection in the same stage of that Re-Entry Draft. Nashville used the No. 2 pick to select defender Eric Miller. The traded pick was Nashville's natural selection.)	(United States) Giovanni Aguilar	MF	Cal State Northridge	Big West	Sacramento Republic	FC Golden State Force	(Canada) Whitecaps FC 2
50	Sporting Kansas City	(United States) Brett St. Martin	DF	Maryland	Big Ten	Baltimore Celtic	—N/a	(United States) Charleston Battery
51	Colorado Rapids	PASS	—N/a	—N/a	—N/a	—N/a	—N/a	—N/a
52	New England Revolution	(United States) Ben Reveno	DF	UCLA	Pac-12	San Jose Earthquakes	—N/a	(United States) New England Revolution II
53	Real Salt Lake	(Brazil) Pedro Fonseca	FW	Louisville	ACC	Fluminense	FC Golden State Force	(United States) Real Monarchs
54	Inter Miami CF (Note: No. 54: Philadelphia → Miami. December 23, 2021: Inter Miami acquired a 2022 second-round selection from Philadelphia in exchange for forward Julián Carranza on loan with a purchase option.)	(United States) Tyler Bagley	MF	Cornell	Ivy League	Irvine Strikers	Boston Bolts	(United States) Inter Miami II
55	Portland Timbers	(United States) Julian Bravo	DF	Santa Clara	WCC	FC Golden State	—N/a	(United States) Portland Timbers 2
56	New York City FC	(Ghana) Kingsford Adjei	FW	Dayton	A-10	Right To Dream Academy	Des Moines Menace	(United States) South Georgia Tormenta

=== Round 3 ===
P	MLS team	Player	Pos.	College	Conference	Academy team	Other team	Signed
57	Charlotte FC	(United States) George Marks	GK	Clemson	ACC	North Carolina FC	North Carolina FC U23	(United States) Charlotte FC
58	FC Cincinnati	PASS	—N/a	—N/a	—N/a	—N/a	—N/a	—N/a
59	Toronto FC	(Canada) Reshaun Walkes	FW	UT Rio Grande Valley	WAC	Toronto FC	Des Moines Menace	(Canada) Toronto FC II
60	LA Galaxy (Note: No. 60: Houston → LA Galaxy. December 12, 2021: LA Galaxy acquired a 2022 third-round selection from Houston in exchange for defender Daniel Steres.)	(United States) Chandler Vaughn	DF	Saint Louis	A-10	D.C. United	Kaw Valley FC	(United States) LA Galaxy II
61	Austin FC	(United States) Michael Knapp	MF	Montclair State	NJAC	New York Red Bulls	New York Red Bulls II	(United States) New York Red Bulls II
62	FC Dallas	(United States) Alec Smir	GK	North Carolina	ACC	NC Fusion	Ocean City Nor'easters	(United States) Minnesota United 2
63	Chicago Fire FC	(United States) Carlo Ritaccio	DF	Akron	MAC	BW Gottschee	Long Island Rough Riders	(United States) Chicago Fire FC II
64	San Jose Earthquakes	(United States) John Martin	MF	Clemson	ACC	CESA	Greenville FC	
65	Inter Miami CF	PASS	—N/a	—N/a	—N/a	—N/a	—N/a	—N/a
66	FC Dallas (Note: No. 66: Los Angeles FC → Dallas. March 9, 2021: Dallas acquired a 2022 third-round selection and additional incentives, if certain performance thresholds are met, from the Los Angeles FC in exchange for forward Cal Jennings and his college protected list rights.)	(United States) Chase Niece	DF	Saint Louis	A-10	St. Louis Scott Gallagher	St. Louis Scott Gallagher	(United States) North Texas SC
67	CF Montréal	(Haiti) Ivy Brisma	FW	NC State	ACC	Philadelphia Union	Wake FC	
68	Columbus Crew	(United States) Chris Donovan	FW	Drexel	CAA	—N/a	West Chester United	(United States) Philadelphia Union II
69	D.C. United	(Norway) Skage Simonsen	MF	SMU	American	Brann	Lokomotiv Oslo	(United States) Loudoun United
70	LA Galaxy	PASS	—N/a	—N/a	—N/a	—N/a	—N/a	—N/a
71	New York Red Bulls	(Greece) Giannis Nikopolidis	GK	Georgetown	Big East	Olympiacos	—N/a	(United States) New York Red Bulls II
72	Vancouver Whitecaps FC	(France) Théo Collomb	FW	UNC Greensboro	SoCon	Clermont	—N/a	(Canada) Whitecaps FC 2
73	New York Red Bulls (Note: No. 73: Minnesota → NY Red Bulls. April 30, 2021: The Red Bulls acquired a 2022 third-round selection from Minnesota in exchange for the homegrown player rights to midfielder Aziel Jackson.)	(United States) Seth Kuhn	MF	Penn State	Big Ten	Philadelphia Union	Reading United	
74	Orlando City SC	(Cambodia) Nick Taylor	FW	UCF	American	Dallas Texans	Albuquerque Sol	(United States) Orlando City B
75	Atlanta United FC	(Ghana) Daniel Bloyou	FW	Penn State	Big Ten	Philadelphia Union	Philadelphia Lone Star	(United States) FC Tucson
76	Seattle Sounders FC	(United States) Hal Uderitz	MF	Seattle	WAC	Crossfire Premier	Crossfire Redmond	(United States) Tacoma Defiance
77	Nashville SC	PASS	—N/a	—N/a	—N/a	—N/a	—N/a	—N/a
78	Sporting Kansas City	PASS	—N/a	—N/a	—N/a	—N/a	—N/a	—N/a
79	Colorado Rapids	PASS	—N/a	—N/a	—N/a	—N/a	—N/a	—N/a
80	New England Revolution	PASS	—N/a	—N/a	—N/a	—N/a	—N/a	—N/a
81	Real Salt Lake	(Germany) Jasper Löffelsend	DF	Pittsburgh	ACC	TV Herkenrath 09	—N/a	(United States) Real Salt Lake
82	Philadelphia Union	PASS	—N/a	—N/a	—N/a	—N/a	—N/a	—N/a
83	Portland Timbers	(Norway) Sivert Haugli	DF	Virginia Tech	ACC	Bærum	Des Moines Menace	(United States) Portland Timbers 2
84	New York City FC	(Morocco) El Mahdi Youssoufi	FW	St. Francis Brooklyn	NEC	FUS Rabat	Toledo Villa	(United States) New York City FC II

=== Compensatory picks ===
P	MLS team	Player	Pos.	College	Conference	Academy team	Other team	Signed
85	Chicago Fire FC (Note: No. 85: Charlotte → Chicago. December 18, 2020: Charlotte and Chicago swapped fourth-round selections in exchange for Charlotte's acquisition of midfielder Brandt Bronico. The pick acquired from Chicago was not exercised.)	(France) Yanis Leerman	DF	UCF	American	Troyes	—N/a	(United States) Loudoun United
86	Vancouver Whitecaps FC (Note: No. 86: Miami → Vancouver. September 5, 2019: Vancouver acquired a conditional 2022 selection from Inter Miami in exchange for midfielder David Norman Jr.)	(Brazil) Vitor Dias	MF	Marshall	C-USA	São Paulo	—N/a	(United States) St. Louis City 2
87	FC Dallas (Note: No. 87: Minnesota → Dallas. December 13, 2020: FC Dallas acquired a 2022 fourth-round selection and up to $50,000 of general allocation money from Minnesota in exchange for the MLS rights to defender Callum Montgomery.)	(United States) Holland Rula	DF	Wake Forest	ACC	FC Dallas	—N/a	
88	Atlanta United FC (Note: No. 88: Colorado → Atlanta. March 4, 2020: Atlanta acquired a 2022 fourth-round selection from Colorado in exchange for the homegrown player rights to midfielder Will Vint.)	(England) Tola Showunmi	FW	New Hampshire	America East	Cheshunt	—N/a	(United States) Pittsburgh Riverhounds
89	San Jose Earthquakes (Note: No. 89: New England → San Jose. December 13, 2020: San Jose acquired a 2022 fourth-round selection from New England in exchange for the player rights to Jon Bell.)	PASS	—N/a	—N/a	—N/a	—N/a	—N/a	—N/a

== Notable undrafted players ==
=== Undrafted ===
Player	Nat.	Position	College	Team	League
Kyle Hiebert	(Canada)	DF	Missouri State Bears	St. Louis City 2	MLS Next Pro

=== Homegrown players ===
Original MLS team	Player	Position	College	Conference	Notes	Ref.
Atlanta United FC	(United States) Justin Garces	GK	UCLA	Pac-12		
Columbus Crew	(United States) Jake Morris	DF	Campbell	Big South		
Columbus Crew	(United States) Sean Zawadzki	MF	Georgetown	Big East		
New York Red Bulls	(United States) Zach Ryan	MF	Stanford	Pac-12		
Seattle Sounders FC	(United States) Dylan Teves	MF	Washington	Pac-12		

=== Eligible players who signed outside of MLS in 2021 ===
This is a list of eligible players who signed in leagues outside of MLS prior to the SuperDraft, but were still draft eligible.

Player	Nat.	Position	College	Conference	Team	League	Notes	Ref.
Haji Abdikadir	(Somalia)	MF	Louisville	ACC	San Diego Loyal	USL Championship	Traded to Colorado Springs Switchbacks	
Giovanni Aguilar	(United States)	MF	CSUN	Big West	Sacramento Republic	USL Championship	Drafted by Vancouver Whitecaps FC and subsequently transferred to Whitecaps FC 2	
Frank Daroma	(Sierra Leone)	MF	Cal State Bernardino	CCAA	Las Vegas Lights	USL Championship	Undrafted	
Michael Knapp	(United States)	MF	Montclair	NJAC	New York Red Bulls II	USL Championship	Drafted by Austin FC	
Roberto Molina	(El Salvador)	MF	UC Irvine	Big West	Las Vegas Lights	USL Championship	Drafted by Colorado Rapids	

== Summary ==
=== Selections by college athletic conference ===
Conference	Round 1	Round 2	Round 3	Comp.	Total
NCAA Division I conferences
ACC	6	6	6	1	19
America East	0	1	0	1	2
American	0	0	2	1	3
ASUN	1	0	0	0	1
A-10	4	1	2	0	7
Big East	2	2	1	0	5
Big Ten	3	1	2	0	6
Big West	1	2	0	0	3
CAA	0	0	1	0	1
Conference USA	0	1	0	1	2
Ivy	0	2	0	0	2
Mid-American	1	3	1	0	5
NEC	0	0	1	0	1
Pac-12	5	5	0	0	10
Patriot	1	1	0	0	2
SoCon	0	0	1	0	1
WAC	3	1	2	0	6
WCC	1	1	1	0	3
NCAA Division III conference
NJAC	0	0	1	0	1
Passes
Pass	0	1	8	1	10

=== Schools with multiple draft selections ===
Selections	Schools
6	Clemson, Saint Louis
5	Washington
3	Notre Dame, St. John's
2	Akron, Duke, Grand Canyon, Marshall, Maryland, NIU, Oregon State, Penn State, Pittsburgh, UCF, UCLA, Wake Forest

== 2022 SuperDraft trades ==
Round 1

Round 2

Round 3

Compensatory picks
