= 2019 Mid-American Conference men's soccer season =

- League: NCAA Division I
- Sport: Soccer
- Duration: August 30, 2019 – November 2, 2019
- Teams: 6

2020 MLS SuperDraft
- Top draft pick: Tom Smart, 45th overall
- Picked by: LA Galaxy

Regular Season
- Season champions: Akron
- Runners-up: Western Michigan

Tournament
- Champions: West Virginia
- Runners-up: Bowling Green

Mid-American Conference men's soccer seasons
- ← 2018 2020 →

2019 Mid-American Conference men's soccer standings
	Conf.					Overall
Team	W		L		T	W		L		T
Akron	4	–	0	–	1	6	–	10	–	2
Western Michigan	2	–	1	–	2	11	–	6	–	2
SIUE	2	–	1	–	2	8	–	5	–	4
Northern Illinois	2	–	3	–	0	7	–	10	–	1
Bowling Green	2	–	3	–	0	13	–	7	–	1
West Virginia ‡	0	–	4	–	1	10	–	9	–	2
‡ – 2019 MAC Tournament champion + – Invited to the 2019 NCAA tournament; As of 25 November 2019; Rankings from United Soccer Coaches; Source: MAC

The 2019 Mid-American Conference men's soccer season will be the 27th season of men's varsity soccer in the Mid-American Conference.

Akron enters the season as the conference tournament champions. West Virginia enters the season as the defending conference regular season champions.

== Background ==
=== Previous season ===
The 2018 season was the 26th season of men's varsity soccer in the Mid-American Conference. Akron won the 2018 MAC Men's Soccer Tournament against Western Michigan. With the MAC Tournament title, Akron earned an automatic bid into the 2018 NCAA Division I Men's Soccer Tournament. MAC regular season champions, West Virginia, earn an at-large bid into the NCAA Tournament. West Virginia and Akron were unseeded in the tournament meaning both programs began in the first round.

In the tournament, West Virginia advanced past LIU Brooklyn before losing in Georgetown in the second round. Akron reached the NCAA College Cup for the second consecutive season, and for the sixth time in program history. This came after defeating Rider, Syracuse, Wake Forest, three-time defending champions Stanford, and Michigan State. In the 2018 NCAA Division I Men's Soccer Championship Game, Akron lost to Maryland, 0–1 off of a penalty kick from Amar Sejdič.

=== Coaching changes ===
Ahead of the 2019 season, SIUE head coach Mario Sanchez was hired by professional soccer club, Louisville City FC. Cale Wassermann was hired to replace Sanchez.

School	Outgoing coach	Manner of departure	Date of vacancy	Position in table	Incoming coach	Date of appointment
SIU Edwardsville	(United States) Mario Sanchez	Hired by Louisville City FC	November 30, 2018	Preseason	(United States) Cale Wassermann	January 17, 2019

== Teams ==
Team	Location	Stadium	Capacity	Coach	Uniforms supplier
Akron Zips	Akron, Ohio	FirstEnergy Stadium-Cub Cadet Field	4,000	(United States) Jared Embick	(Germany) adidas
Bowling Green Falcons	Bowling Green, Ohio	Cochrane Stadium	1,000	(United States) Eric Nichols	(United States) Nike
Northern Illinois Huskies	DeKalb, Illinois	NIU Soccer and Track & Field Complex	1,500	(Scotland) Ryan Swan	(Germany) adidas
SIU Edwardsville Cougars	Edwardsville, Illinois	Ralph Korte Stadium	4,000	(United States) Cale Wassermann	(Germany) adidas
West Virginia Mountaineers	Morgantown, West Virginia	Dlesk Stadium	1,600	(United States) Marlon LeBlanc	(United States) Nike
Western Michigan Broncos	Kalamazoo, Michigan	WMU Soccer Complex	500	(United States) Chad Wiseman	(Germany) adidas

== Preseason ==
=== Preseason poll ===
The preseason poll was released on August 26, 2019.

	Team ranking	Points	First
1.	Akron	35	5
2.	Western Michigan	27	1
3.	West Virginia	22	0
4.	SIUE	15	0
5.	Bowling Green	14	0
6.	Northern Illinois	13	0

=== Preseason national polls ===
The preseason national polls were released in July and August 2019. United Soccer Coaches, Soccer America, and TopDrawer Soccer have a Top 25 poll, while College Soccer News has a Top 30 poll.

	United; Soccer	CSN	Soccer; America	Top Drawer; Soccer
Akron	3	3	2	2
Bowling Green	—	—	—	—
Northern Illinois	—	—	—	—
SIUE	—	—	—	—
West Virginia	23	2	—	2
Western Michigan	—	—	—	—

== Regular season ==
=== Early season tournaments ===
Early season tournaments will be announced in late Spring and Summer 2019.

Team	Tournament	Finish
Bowling Green	Chicago Classic	1st
SIUE	Michigan Classic	3rd
Western Michigan	Bronco Soccer Fest	1st

=== Conference results ===
Color Key: Home • Away • Win • Loss • Draw • Postponed
Club	Match				
Club	1	2	3	4	5
Akron Zips (AKR)	BGSU	WMU	SIUE	NIU	WVU
Akron Zips (AKR)	2–1	1–1	3–0	3–2	1–0
Bowling Green Falcons (BGSU)	AKR	SIUE	WVU	WMU	NIU
Bowling Green Falcons (BGSU)	1–2	0–2	3–0	0–1	1–0
Northern Illinois Huskies (NIU)	SIUE	WVU	WMU	AKR	BGSU
Northern Illinois Huskies (NIU)	1–2	4–2	3–2	2–3	0–1
SIU Edwardsville Cougars (SIUE)	NIU	BGSU	AKR	WVU	WMU
SIU Edwardsville Cougars (SIUE)	2–1	2–0	0–3	0–0	1–1
West Virginia Mountaineers (WVU)	WMU	NIU	BGSU	SIUE	AKR
West Virginia Mountaineers (WVU)	1–3	2–4	0–3	0–0	0–1
Western Michigan Broncos (WMU)	WVU	AKR	NIU	BGSU	SIUE
Western Michigan Broncos (WMU)	3–1	1–1	2–3	1–0	1–1

=== Standings ===
Conference										Overall								Qualification
Pos	Team	Pld	W	L	T	GF	GA	GD	Pts	Pld	W	L	T	GF	GA	GD	Pts	Qualification
1	Akron	5	4	0	1	10	4	+6	13	18	6	10	2	21	23	−2	20	2019 MAC Men's Soccer Tournament
2	Bowling Green	0	0	0	0	0	0	0	0	0	0	0	0	0	0	0	0	2019 MAC Men's Soccer Tournament
3	Northern Illinois	0	0	0	0	0	0	0	0	0	0	0	0	0	0	0	0	2019 MAC Men's Soccer Tournament
4	SIUE	0	0	0	0	0	0	0	0	0	0	0	0	0	0	0	0	2019 MAC Men's Soccer Tournament
5	West Virginia	0	0	0	0	0	0	0	0	0	0	0	0	0	0	0	0	
6	Western Michigan	0	0	0	0	0	0	0	0	0	0	0	0	0	0	0	0	

Updated to match(es) played on August 3, 2019. Source: MAC

== Postseason ==
=== MAC Tournament ===
The 2019 MAC Tournament was held from November 12–17, 2019.

First Round
4	Bowling Green	2
5	Northern Illinois	1
3	SIUE	0
6	West Virginia	1

Semifinals
1	Akron	0
4	Bowling Green	1
2	Western Michigan	2
3	West Virginia	3

Championship
4	Bowling Green	0
6	West Virginia	1

=== NCAA Tournament ===
The NCAA Tournament began in November 2019 and concluded on December 17, 2019.

Seed	Region	School	1st Round	2nd Round	3rd Round	Quarterfinals	Semifinals	Championship
—N/a	3	West Virginia	W, 5–1 at Butler (Indianapolis)	L, 1–2 at (11) Marshall (Huntington)	—	—	—	—

== Rankings ==
=== National rankings ===
	Improvement in ranking
	Drop in ranking
RV	Received votes but were not ranked in Top 25
NV	No votes received

		Pre	Wk 1	Wk 2	Wk 3	Wk 4	Wk 5	Wk 6	Wk 7	Wk 8	Wk 9	Wk 10	Wk 11	Wk 12	Wk 13	Wk 14	Wk 15	Wk 16	Final
Akron	USC	3	21	RV	NV	NV	NV	NV	NV	NV	NV				None released				
Akron	TDS	2	2	12	NV	NV	NV	NV	NV	NV	NV								
Bowling Green	USC	NV	RV	25	RV	RV	NV	NV	NV	NV	NV				None released				
Bowling Green	TDS	NV	NV	NV	NV	NV	NV	NV	NV	NV	NV								
Northern Illinois	USC	NV	NV	NV	NV	NV	NV	NV	NV	NV	NV				None released				
Northern Illinois	TDS	NV	NV	NV	NV	NV	NV	NV	NV	NV	NV								
SIUE	USC	NV	RV	NV	NV	NV	NV	NV	NV	NV	NV				None released				
SIUE	TDS	NV	NV	NV	NV	NV	NV	NV	NV	NV	NV								
West Virginia	USC	23	21	RV	20	RV	23	RV	NV	NV	NV				None released				
West Virginia	TDS	25	25	24	NV	RV	NV	NV	NV	NV	NV								
Western Michigan	USC	NV	NV	NV	NV	NV	NV	NV	NV	NV	RV				None released				
Western Michigan	TDS	NV	NV	NV	NV	NV	NV	NV	NV	NV	NV								

=== Regional rankings - USC North Region ===
	Improvement in ranking
	Drop in ranking
RV	Received votes but were not ranked in Top 10
NV	No votes received

The United Soccer Coaches' North Region includes teams from the Mid-American Conference, the Big Ten Conference, and the Horizon League.

	Wk 1	Wk 2	Wk 3	Wk 4	Wk 5	Wk 6	Wk 7	Wk 8	Wk 9	Wk 10	Wk 11	Wk 12
Akron	6	NV	NV	NV	NV	NV	NV	NV	NV			
Bowling Green	8	2	5	7	9	7	8	9	8			
Northern Illinois	NV	NV	NV	NV	NV	NV	NV	NV	NV			
SIUE	5	8	NV	NV	NV	NV	10	6	6			
West Virginia	3	4	2	6	2	3	9	10	NV			
Western Michigan	NV	NV	NV	NV	NV	10	7	4	4			

== Awards and honors ==
=== Player of the week honors ===
Week	Player	Position	Team	Ref.
Week 1	Noah Heim	GK	SIUE	
Week 2	Anthony Bowie	FW	Western Michigan	
Week 2	Achille Robin	DF	Bowling Green	
Week 3	Robles Grajer	FW	West Virginia	
Week 4	Jorge Gonzalez	FW	SIUE	
Week 5	Andres Muriel Albino	MF	West Virginia	
Week 6	Anthony Bowie	FW	Western Michigan	
Week 7	Charlie Sharp	MF	Western Michigan	
Week 8	Alex Welch	MF	Northern Illinois	
Week 9				
Week 10				

=== Postseason honors ===
2019 MAC Men's Soccer Individual Awards
Award	Recipient(s)
Offensive Player of the Year	
Defensive Player of the Year	
Midfielder of the Year	
Goalkeeper of the Year	
Coach of the Year	
Freshman of the Year	

2019 MAC Men's Soccer All-Conference Teams
First Team Honorees	Second Team Honorees	All-Freshman Team Honorees	Sportsmanship Award Honorees

=== National awards ===
Award	Winner	School	Ref.

== 2020 MLS Draft ==
The 2020 MLS SuperDraft will be held in January 2020.

=== Total picks by school ===
Team	Round 1	Round 2	Round 3	Round 4	Total
Akron	0	1	0	0	1
Bowling Green	0	0	0	0	0
Northern Illinois	0	0	0	0	0
SIUE	0	0	1	0	1
West Virginia	0	0	0	0	0
Western Michigan	0	0	0	0	0

=== List of selections ===
Rnd.	Pick	Player	Pos.	Team	School
2	45	Tom Smart	DF	LA Galaxy	Akron
3	76	Jorge González	MF	Los Angeles FC	SIUE

== Homegrown players ==
The Homegrown Player Rule is a Major League Soccer program that allows MLS teams to sign local players from their own development academies directly to MLS first team rosters. Before the creation of the rule in 2008, every player entering Major League Soccer had to be assigned through one of the existing MLS player allocation processes, such as the MLS SuperDraft.

To place a player on its homegrown player list, making him eligible to sign as a homegrown player, players must have resided in that club's home territory and participated in the club's youth development system for at least one year. Players can play college soccer and still be eligible to sign a homegrown contract.

Original MLS team	Player	Pos.	School	Ref.
