= 2019 MAC men's soccer tournament =

27th edition of the MAC Men's Soccer Tournament

- Classification: Division I
- Teams: 6
- Matches: 5
- Attendance: 2,421
- Quarterfinals site: Higher seeds
- Semifinals site: FirstEnergy Stadium; Akron, OH
- Finals site: FirstEnergy Stadium; Akron, OH
- Champions: West Virginia (1st title)
- Winning coach: Marlon LeBlanc (1st title)
- MVP: Steven Tekesky (West Virginia)
- Broadcast: ESPN+
MAC men's soccer tournament
«2018	2021»

2019 Mid-American Conference men's soccer standings
	Conf.					Overall
Team	W		L		T	W		L		T
Akron	4	–	0	–	1	6	–	10	–	2
Western Michigan	2	–	1	–	2	11	–	6	–	2
SIUE	2	–	1	–	2	8	–	5	–	4
Northern Illinois	2	–	3	–	0	7	–	10	–	1
Bowling Green	2	–	3	–	0	13	–	7	–	1
West Virginia ‡	0	–	4	–	1	10	–	9	–	2
‡ – 2019 MAC Tournament champion + – Invited to the 2019 NCAA tournament; As of 25 November 2019; Rankings from United Soccer Coaches; Source: MAC

The 2019 MAC men's soccer tournament was the 27th and final edition of the MAC Men's Soccer Tournament, a post-season college soccer conference tournament to determine the MAC champion, and the conference's automatic berth into the NCAA Division I men's soccer tournament. The 2019 edition of the tournament began on November 12 and concluded on November 17, 2019.

The lowest seeded team in the tournament, West Virginia, won the MAC title, giving the program their first MAC championship, and their first overall conference championship since 1992. It was the first year since 2011 that a team other than Akron won the MAC Tournament. Marlon LeBlanc earned his first conference championship with the program. With the title, West Virginia earned their second consecutive berth into the NCAA Tournament, and their 14th overall berth. West Virginia defeated Butler 5–1 in the opening round before losing to in-state rivals, Marshall, 1–2.

On May 12, 2020 it was announced that the 2019 edition of the tournament would be the final tournament until at least 2024. From 2020 going forward, the regular season champion would be declared the MAC champion, in part due to the COVID-19 pandemic.

== Seeds ==
Seed	School	Conference	Tiebreaker
1	Akron	4–0–1	
2	Western Michigan	2–1–2	Goal difference
3	SIUE	2–1–2	
4	Bowling Green	2–3–0	BGSU 1–0 vs. NIU
5	Northern Illinois	2–3–0	NIU 0–1 vs. BGSU
6	West Virginia	0–4–1	

== Bracket ==
First Round
4	Bowling Green	2
5	Northern Illinois	1
3	SIUE	0
6	West Virginia	1

Semifinals
1	Akron	0
4	Bowling Green	1
2	Western Michigan	2
3	West Virginia	3

Championship
4	Bowling Green	0
6	West Virginia	1

== Schedule ==
=== First round ===
November 12, 2019
5:00 PM EST

No. 4 Bowling Green	2–1 (a.e.t.)	No. 5 Northern Illinois
Montemurri 8'; Robin 95' (pen.)	Report	Maertins 22'

Cochrane Stadium, Bowling Green, Ohio
Attendance: 174
Referee: Donovan Noocha

November 12, 2019
8:00 PM EST

No. 3 SIUE	0–1	No. 6 West Virginia
	Report	Grajera 43'

Ralph Korte Stadium, Edwardsville, Illinois
Attendance: 77

=== Semifinals ===
November 15, 2019
3:00 PM EST

No. 2 Western Michigan	2–3	No. 6 West Virginia
Liagre 58'; Nimick 86'	Report	DiMatteo 24', 27'; Andres-Llop 66'

FirstEnergy Stadium, Akron, Ohio
Attendance: 828
Referee: Kevin Fikar

November 15, 2019
6:00 PM EST

No. 1 Akron	0–1	No. 4 Bowling Green
	Report	Sullivan 18'

FirstEnergy Stadium, Akron, Ohio
Attendance: 828
Referee: Nikola Aleksic

=== Championship ===
November 17, 2019
1:00 PM EST

No. 1 Bowling Green	0–1	No. 6 West Virginia
	Report	McCormick 86'

FirstEnergy Stadium, Akron, Ohio
Attendance: 514
Referee: Sorin Stoica

== Statistics ==
=== Goalscorers ===
2 Goals

- (United States) Josh DiMatteo – West Virginia

1 Goal

- (Spain) Albert Andres-Llop – West Virginia
- (Germany) Jan Maertins – Northern Illinois
- (United States) Luke McCormick – West Virginia
- (England) Daniel Nimick – Western Michigan
- (Canada) Michael Montemurri – Bowling Green
- (France) Paul Liagre – Western Michigan
- (France) Achille Robin – Bowling Green
- (Spain) Rodrigo Robles Grajera – West Virginia
- (United States) Chris Sullivan – Bowling Green

== All-Tournament team ==
Player	Team
**2020 MAC Men's Soccer All-Tournament team**
Skye Harter	Akron
Diogo Pacheco	Akron
Jaylen Shannon	Western Michigan
Daniel Nimick	Western Michigan
Chris Sullivan	Bowling Green
Anthony Mwembia	Bowling Green
Achille Robin	Bowling Green
Luke McCormick	West Virginia
Josh DiMatteo	West Virginia
Ryan Kellogg	West Virginia
**Steven Tekesky**	West Virginia

MVP in bold.
