= 2021 Clemson Tigers men's soccer team =

American college soccer season

2021 Clemson Tigers men's soccer

ACC Atlantic Division Champions

NCAA Tournament, Champions
- Conference: Atlantic Coast Conference
- U. Soc. Coaches poll: No. 1
- TopDrawerSoccer.com: No. 1
- Record: 16–5–2 (5–3–0 ACC)
- Head coach: Mike Noonan (12th season)
- Assistant coaches: Philip Jones (9th season); Camilo Rodriguez (6th season)
- Home stadium: Riggs Field

2021 ACC men's soccer standings
	Conf.					Overall
Team	W		L		T	W		L		T
Atlantic
No. 1 Clemson +	5	–	3	–	0	16	–	5	–	2
Louisville +	5	–	3	–	0	10	–	7	–	1
No. 17 Wake Forest +	4	–	3	–	1	13	–	7	–	1
Boston College	2	–	4	–	2	6	–	7	–	2
Syracuse	2	–	5	–	1	8	–	8	–	2
NC State	1	–	5	–	2	7	–	8	–	2
Coastal
No. 12 Duke +	5	–	2	–	1	14	–	5	–	1
No. 6 Pittsburgh +	5	–	2	–	1	13	–	5	–	2
No. 4 Notre Dame ‡	4	–	2	–	2	14	–	5	–	5
North Carolina +	4	–	4	–	0	11	–	7	–	2
No. 19 Virginia Tech +	3	–	4	–	1	11	–	5	–	4
Virginia	2	–	5	–	1	6	–	9	–	3
‡ – ACC Tournament champion + – Also invited to the 2021 NCAA tournament; As of December 14, 2021; Rankings from United Soccer Coaches; Source: The ACC

The 2021 Clemson Tigers men's soccer team represented Clemson University during the 2021 NCAA Division I men's soccer season. They were led by head coach Mike Noonan, in his twelfth season. They played their home games at Riggs Field. This was the team's 61st season playing organized men's college soccer and their 34th playing in the Atlantic Coast Conference.

The Tigers finished the season 16–5–2 overall and 5–3–0 in ACC play to finish in a tie for first in the Atlantic Division. As the second overall seed in the ACC Tournament, they defeated North Carolina in the Quarterfinals before losing to Duke in the Semifinals. They received an at large bid to the NCAA Tournament and were awarded the eight overall seed. After a First Round bye, they defeated Denver in overtime in the Second Round and Kentucky in the Third Round. In the quarterfinals, they face off against top seed Oregon State, who they defeated on penalties to advance. Penalties were required again to defeat Notre Dame in the Semifinals. In the Final Clemson defeated Washington to win their third National Title in program history.

== Background ==
The Tigers' 2020 season was significantly impacted by the COVID-19 pandemic, which curtailed the fall season and caused the NCAA Tournament to be played in spring 2021. The ACC was one of the only two conferences in men's soccer to play in the fall of 2020. The ACC also held a mini-season during the spring of 2021.

The Tigers finished the fall season 8–2–1 and 3–2–1 in ACC play to finish in third place in the North Division. They won the ACC Tournament by defeating Virginia Tech, Virginia and Pittsburgh in the final. They finished the spring season 4–1–1 and 4–1–1 in ACC play, to finish in first place in the Atlantic Division. They received the ACC's automatic bid to the NCAA Tournament after defeating Pittsburgh in a game for the bid. As the first seed in the tournament, they defeated American in the Second Round before losing to Marshall in the Third Round on penalty kicks to end their season.

== Player movement ==
=== Players leaving ===
Players Leaving
Name	Number	Pos.	Height	Weight	Year	Hometown	Reason for departure
Max Fisher	0	GK	6'2"	190	(redshirt) Senior	Salisbury, NC	Graduated
Kimarni Smith	9	FW	6'1"	160	Senior	Nottingham, England	Declared for 2021 MLS SuperDraft, drafted 4th overall by D.C. United.
Grayson Barber	11	FW	5'9"	165	Junior	Elgin, SC	Signed Home Grown Player contract with Sporting Kansas City
Chris Matlashewski	19	FW	6'0"	155	(redshirt) Sophomore	Myrtle Beach, SC	—
Philip Mayaka	20	MF	5'7"	135	Sophomore	Nairobi, Kenya	Declared for 2021 MLS SuperDraft, drafted 3rd overall by the Colorado Rapids
Stirling Russell	24	MF	5'11"	165	(redshirt) Junior	Belleveue, WA	Graduated
Matthew Boberg	28	FW	5'5"	140	(redshirt) Freshman	Brownsburg, IN	Transferred to Boston University

=== Players arriving ===
The Tigers added seven players across two signing days, one in November and one in March.

Name	Nat.	Hometown	Club	TDS Rating
Elton Chifamba; MF	USA	Blacklick, OH	Columbus Crew Academy	4/5 stars
Tristan DeLoach; MF	USA	Savannah, GA	Tormenta FC	3/5 stars
Adam Lundegard; DF	USA	La Plata, MD	D.C. United	4/5 stars
Dawson Malcolm; DF	USA	Clover, SC	Charlotte Soccer Academy	3/5 stars
Henry Suah; FW	USA	Crystal, MN	Minneapolis United	N/A
Zack Farnsworth; DF	USA	Sandy, UT	Real Monarchs SLC	N/A
Camilo Comi; FW	ARG	Rosario, Argentina	Club Atletico Talleres	N/A
Tim Ströbeck; FW	SWE	Hässleholm, Sweden	Hässleholms IF	N/A

== Squad ==
=== Roster ===
As of February 10, 2022

Note: Flags indicate national team as defined under FIFA eligibility rules; some limited exceptions apply. Players may hold more than one non-FIFA nationality.

No.	Pos.	Nation	Player
1	GK	USA	George Marks
2	DF	USA	Ben Erkens
3	DF	SWE	Oskar Ågren
4	DF	SEN	Justin Malou
5	DF	SEN	Hamady Diop
6	DF	USA	Dylan Sullivan
7	FW	SWE	Tim Ströbeck
8	MF	USA	Callum Johnson
9	MF	ESP	Mohamed Seye
10	MF	ECU	Luis Felipe Fernandez-Salvador
11	FW	ARG	Camilo Comi
12	DF	USA	Enrique Montana III
13	MF	USA	John Martin
14	DF	USA	Titus Sandy Jr
15	DF	USA	Charlie Asensio

No.	Pos.	Nation	Player
16	MF	USA	Tristan DeLoach
17	MF	USA	Quinn McNeill
18	MF	ESP	Alvaro Gomez
19	MF	USA	Elton Chifamba
20	MF	USA	Brandon Parrish
21	MF	SEN	Ousmane Sylla
22	GK	USA	Trevor Manion
23	FW	USA	Josh Hallenberger
25	FW	USA	James Brighton
26	DF	USA	Jake Barron
27	DF	USA	Isaiah Reid
28	DF	USA	Adam Lundegard
29	DF	USA	Tyler Hutchinson
31	GK	USA	Giles Thaxter
33	DF	USA	Dawson Malcolm

=== Team management ===
Position	Staff
Athletic director	(United States) Dan Radakovich
Head coach	(United States) Mike Noonan
Associate head coach	(England) Philip Jones
Assistant coach	(Colombia) Camilo Rodriguez
Director of Operations	(United States) Rob Thompson

== Schedule ==
Date Time, TV	Rank^{#}	Opponent^{#}	Result	Record	Site (Attendance) City, State
Exhibition
August 15*; 7:00 p.m.	No. 6	Wofford	W 5–0	–	Riggs Field; Clemson, SC
August 21*; 7:00 p.m.	No. 6	at Georgia State	T 0–0	—	GSU Soccer Field; Atlanta, GA
Regular season
August 26*; 7:00 p.m., ACCNX	No. 6	St. John's	W 2–1	1–0–0	Riggs Field (0); Clemson, SC
August 29*; 7:00 p.m., ACCNX	No. 6	USC Upstate	W 5–0	2–0–0	Riggs Field (N/A); Clemson, SC
September 3*; 7:00 p.m., ACCNX	No. 4	South Carolina; Rivalry	W 5–0	3–0–0	Riggs Field (4,524); Clemson, SC
September 6*; 7:00 p.m., ACCN	No. 4	South Florida	W 3–0	4–0–0	Riggs Field (1,412); Clemson, SC
September 10; 7:00 p.m., ACCNX	No. 2	at NC State	W 2–0	5–0–0 (1–0–0)	Dail Soccer Field (1,840); Raleigh, NC
September 14*; 7:00 p.m., ACCNX	No. 2	Georgia Southern	W 5–0	6–0–0	Riggs Field (1,232); Clemson, SC
September 17; 7:00 p.m., ACCNX	No. 2	Boston College	W 3–0	7–0–0 (2–0–0)	Riggs Field (3,032); Clemson, SC
September 21*; 7:00 p.m., ESPN+	No. 2	at UNC Greensboro	L 1–3	7–1–0	UNCG Soccer Stadium (569); Greensboro, NC
September 25; 7:00 p.m., ACCNX	No. 2	No. 15 Pittsburgh	L 0–2	7–2–0 (2–1–0)	Riggs Field (2,231); Clemson, SC
October 1; 7:00 p.m., ACCNX	No. 19	at Wake Forest	W 2–1	8–2–0 (3–1–0)	Spry Stadium (3,560); Winston–Salem, NC
October 5*; 7:00 p.m.	No. 21	at Coastal Carolina	W 2–0	9–2–0	CCU Soccer Field (858); Conway, SC
October 9; 7:00 p.m., ACCRSN	No. 21	Notre Dame	L 0–2	9–3–0 (3–2–0)	Riggs Field (1,500); Clemson, SC
October 15; 7:00 p.m., ACCNX	No. 23	at No. 9 Duke	W 3–2 ^{OT}	10–3–0 (4–2–0)	Koskinen Stadium (1,204); Durham, NC
October 23; 7:00 p.m., ACCNX	No. 6	at Syracuse	L 0–2	10–4–0 (4–3–0)	SU Soccer Stadium (1,205); Syracuse, NY
October 26*; 7:00 p.m., ACCNX	No. 15	No. 17 FIU	W 4–0	11–4–0	Riggs Field (1,335); Clemson, SC
October 29; 7:00 p.m., ACCN	No. 15	Louisville	W 5–1	12–4–0 (5–3–0)	Riggs Field (1,889); Clemson, SC
ACC tournament
November 7; 8:00 p.m., ACCN	(2) No. 9	(7) No. 18 North Carolina; Quarterfinals	W 2–1	13–4–0	Riggs Field (2,351); Clemson, SC
November 10; 7:00 p.m., ACCN	(2) No. 9	(3) No. 11 Duke; Semifinals	L 0–1	13–5–0	Riggs Field (3,237); Clemson, SC
NCAA tournament
November 21; 7:00 p.m.	(8) No. 9	Denver; Second Round	W 1–0 ^{2OT}	14–5–0	Riggs Field (1,849); Clemson, SC
November 28; 7:00 p.m., ACCNX	(8) No. 9	(9) No. 15 Kentucky; Third Round	W 2–1	15–5–0	Riggs Field (1,793); Clemson, SC
December 4; 9:00 p.m., P12N	(8) No. 9	at (1) No. 1 Oregon State; Quarterfinals	T 1–1 (4–3 PKs) ^{2OT}	15–5–1	Wayne Valley Stadium (1,415); Corvallis, OR
December 10; 6:00 p.m., ESPNU	(8) No. 9	(4) No. 20 Notre Dame; Semifinals	T 1–1 (5–4 PKs) ^{2OT}	15–5–2	WakeMed Soccer Park (10,132); Cary, NC
December 12; 2:00 p.m., ESPNU	(8) No. 9	(2) No. 3 Washington; Final	W 2–0	16–5–2	WakeMed Soccer Park (7,238); Cary, NC
*Non-conference game. ^{#}Rankings from United Soccer Coaches. (#) Tournament seedings in parentheses. All times are in Eastern.

== Goals Record ==
Rank	No.	Nat.	Po.	Name	Regular season	ACC Tournament	NCAA Tournament	Total
1	27	(United States)	FW	Isaiah Reid	6	1	2	9
2	10	(Ecuador)	MF	Luis Felipe Fernandez-Salvador	6	0	2	8
3	3	(Sweden)	DF	Oskar Ågren	4	0	1	5
3	9	(Spain)	MF	Mohamed Seye	5	0	0	5
3	21	(Senegal)	MF	Ousmane Sylla	5	0	0	5
6	17	(United States)	MF	Quinn McNeill	3	1	0	4
7	5	(Senegal)	DF	Hamady Diop	3	0	0	3
7	7	(Sweden)	FW	Tim Ströbeck	3	0	0	3
7	8	(United States)	MF	Callum Johnson	2	0	1	3
7	18	(Spain)	MF	Alvaro Gomez	2	0	1	3
11	23	(United States)	FW	Josh Hallenberger	2	0	0	2
12	20	(United States)	MF	Brandon Parrish	1	0	0	1
Total					42	2	7	51

== Disciplinary record ==
Rank	No.	Nat.	Po.	Name	Regular Season			ACC Tournament			NCAA Tournament			Total		
Rank	No.	Nat.	Po.	Name	Yellow card	(yellow card) (yellow-red card)	Red card	Yellow card	(yellow card) (yellow-red card)	Red card	Yellow card	(yellow card) (yellow-red card)	Red card	Yellow card	(yellow card) (yellow-red card)	Red card
1	5	(Senegal)	DF	Hamady Diop	3	1	0	1	0	0	1	0	0	5	1	0
2	8	(United States)	FW	Callum Johnson	4	0	0	0	0	0	1	0	0	5	0	0
3	3	(Sweden)	DF	Oskar Ågren	3	0	0	0	0	0	0	0	0	3	0	0
3	4	(Senegal)	DF	Justin Malou	1	0	1	0	0	0	0	0	0	1	0	1
3	15	(United States)	DF	Charlie Asensio	0	0	0	0	0	0	3	0	0	3	0	0
3	21	(Senegal)	MF	Ousmane Sylla	1	0	0	0	0	0	2	0	0	3	0	0
7	1	(United States)	GK	George Marks	1	0	0	0	0	0	1	0	0	2	0	0
7	9	(Spain)	FW	Mohamed Seye	0	0	0	1	0	0	1	0	0	2	0	0
7	17	(United States)	MF	Quinn McNeill	2	0	0	0	0	0	0	0	0	2	0	0
7	19	(United States)	MF	Elton Chifamba	1	0	0	0	0	0	1	0	0	2	0	0
11	2	(United States)	DF	Ben Erkens	1	0	0	0	0	0	0	0	0	1	0	0
11	6	(United States)	DF	Dylan Sullivan	1	0	0	0	0	0	0	0	0	1	0	0
11	10	(Ecuador)	MF	Luis Felipe Fernandez-Salvador	1	0	0	0	0	0	0	0	0	1	0	0
11	11	(Argentina)	FW	Camilo Comi	1	0	0	0	0	0	0	0	0	1	0	0
11	12	(United States)	DF	Enrique Montana III	1	0	0	0	0	0	0	0	0	1	0	0
11	20	(United States)	MF	Brandon Parrish	1	0	0	0	0	0	1	0	0	1	0	0
11	27	(United States)	FW	Isaiah Reid	0	0	0	0	0	0	1	0	0	1	0	0
Total					21	1	1	2	0	0	12	0	0	35	1	1

== Awards and honors ==
Recipient	Award	Date	Ref.
Oskar Ågren	Preseason All-ACC Watchlist	August 18	
George Marks	ACC Defensive Player of the Week	August 31	
George Marks	ACC Defensive Player of the Week	September 14	
Charlie Asensio	ACC Defensive Player of the Week	October 5	
Quinn McNeill	ACC Offensive Player of the Week	November 2	
Oskar Ågren	ACC Co-defensive Player of the Week	November 2	
Oskar Ågren	All-ACC First Team	November 10	
Hamady Diop	All-ACC Second Team	November 10	
George Marks	All-ACC Second Team	November 10	
Ousmane Sylla	All-ACC Second Team	November 10	
Quinn McNeill	All-ACC Third Team	November 10	
Quinn McNeill	ACC All-Tournament Team	November 15	
Oskar Ågren	ACC All-Tournament Team	November 15	

== 2022 MLS Super Draft ==
Player	Team	Round	Pick #	Position
Oskar Ågren	San Jose Earthquakes	1	13	DF
Charlie Asensio	Austin FC	2	35	DF
Callum Johnson	LA Galaxy	2	42	MF
Luis Felipe Fernandez-Salvador	Vancouver Whitecaps	2	44	MF
George Marks	Charlotte FC	3	57	GK
John Martin	San Jose Earthquakes	3	64	MF

== Rankings ==
Ranking movements Legend: ██ Increase in ranking ██ Decrease in ranking ( ) = First-place votes
	Week																
Poll	Pre	1	2	3	4	5	6	7	8	9	10	11	12	13	14	15	Final
United Soccer	6 (1)	4 (1)	2 (6)	2 (5)	2 (4)	19	21	23	6	15	9	9	Not released				1 (24)
TopDrawer Soccer	8	6	3	2	2	10	9	15	6	17	15	15	17	14	8	4	1
