= 2021 MAC men's soccer tournament =

2021 Mid-American Conference Men's soccer tournament
- Classification: Division I
- Teams: 4
- Matches: 3
- Attendance: 1,011
- Site: NIU Soccer Complex; DeKalb, Illinois
- Champions: Northern Illinois (3rd title)
- Winning coach: Ryan Swan (1st title)
- MVP: Nick Markanich (Northern Illinois)
- Broadcast: None
Mid-American Conference Men's soccer tournament
«2019	2022»

2021 Mid-American Conference men's soccer standings
	Conf.					Overall
Team	W		L		T	W		L		T
No. 21 Northern Illinois ‡	4	–	0	–	2	15	–	3	–	2
No. 8 West Virginia +	4	–	1	–	1	12	–	3	–	6
Georgia State +	3	–	3	–	0	13	–	7	–	0
Bowling Green +	2	–	2	–	2	11	–	6	–	3
Western Michigan	2	–	3	–	1	7	–	6	–	5
Akron +	2	–	3	–	1	9	–	6	–	3
Georgia Southern	0	–	5	–	1	4	–	12	–	1
‡ – 2021 MAC Tournament champion + – At-large invitation to the 2021 NCAA tournament; As of December 14, 2021; Rankings from United Soccer Coaches; Source: MAC

The 2021 Mid-American Conference men's soccer tournament was the postseason women's soccer tournament for the Mid-American Conference held from November 11 through November 14, 2021. The tournament took place at the NIU Soccer Complex in DeKalb, Illinois, home of the Northern Illinois Huskies, the regular season conference champions. The four-team single-elimination tournament consisted of two rounds based on seeding from regular season conference play. The West Virginia were the defending champions after having won the title in 2019. There was no tournament in 2020 due to the COVID-19 pandemic, so the 2019 champions were considered the defending champions. West Virginia was unable to defend its title, losing to Georgia State in the Semifinals. Northern Illinois would go on to beat Georgia State in the final 2–1 in overtime. The title was the third for the Northern Illinois men's soccer program and the first of which came under head coach Ryan Swan. As tournament champions, Northern Illinois earned the Mid-American's automatic berth into the 2021 NCAA Division I men's soccer tournament.

== Seeding ==
Four of the seven Mid-American men's soccer programs qualified for the 2021 Tournament. Teams were seeded based on their regular season records. Tiebreakers were used to determine the seedings of teams who finished with identical conference records. No tiebreakers were required as each of the top four teams finished with unique records.

Seed	School	Conference Record	Points
1	Northern Illinois	4–0–2	14
2	West Virginia	4–1–1	13
3	Georgia State	3–3–0	9
4	Bowling Green	2–2–2	8

== Bracket ==
Semifinals; Thursday, Nov. 11
1	Northern Illinois	5
4	Bowling Green	2
2	West Virginia	0
3	Georgia State	1

Final; Sunday, Nov. 14
1	Northern Illinois (a.e.t.)	2
3	Georgia State	1

== Schedule ==
=== Semifinals ===
November 11, 2021	#2 West Virginia	0–1	#3 Georgia State	DeKalb, IL
4:00 p.m. EST	Aaron Denk Gracia (yellow card) 52'	Report	(yellow card) 64' Andrew Miller-Bell; 76' Justin Guest	Stadium: NIU Soccer Complex; Attendance: 50

November 11, 2021	#1 Northern Illinois	5–2	#4 Bowling Green	DeKalb, IL
7:00 p.m. EST	Zachariah Thomas 41'; Roque Viegas 53'; Nick Markanich 57'; Pepe Martinez 58'; Miguel Maynez 67'	Report	68' Zach Buescher; 81' Jacob Erlandson	Stadium: NIU Soccer Complex; Attendance: 435; Referee: Kevin Fikar; Assistant referees: Michael Nickerson; Anthony Vasoli; Fourth official: Ted Grigoriou

=== Final ===
November 14, 2021	#1 Northern Illinois	2–1 (a.e.t.)	#3 Georgia State	DeKalb, IL
1:00 p.m. EST	Miguel Maynez 51'; Malcom Ward (yellow card) 74'; Nick Markanich 105'	Report	22' Max Wilkins; (yellow card) 34' Andrew Miller-Bell; (yellow card) 49' Simon Carlson	Stadium: NIU Soccer Complex; Attendance: 526; Referee: Calin Radosav; Assistant referees: Zachary Richter; Besnik Rexhepi; Fourth official: Boris Vukovic

== Statistics ==
=== Goalscorers ===
There were 11 goals scored in 3 matches, for an average of 3.67 goals per match.

2 goals

- Nick Markanich – Northern Illinois
- Miguel Maynez – Northern Illinois

1 goal

- Zach Buescher – Bowling Green
- Jacob Erlandson – Bowling Green
- Justin Guest – Georgia State
- Max Wilkins – Georgia State
- Pepe Martinez – Northern Illinois
- Zachariah Thomas – Northern Illinois
- Roque Viegas – Northern Illinois

== All-Tournament team ==
Player	Team
**Nick Markanich**	Northern Illinois
Pepe Martinez	Northern Illinois
Anthony Markanich	Northern Illinois
Roque Viegas	Northern Illinois
Ramon Munoz	Georgia State
Gunther Rankenburg	Georgia State
Logan Luque	Georgia State
Jaker Erlandson	Bowling Green
Zach Buescher	Bowling Green
Ryan Baer	West Virginia
Bjarne Thiesen	West Virginia

MVP in bold
