= Steve Simmons (soccer) =

American soccer coach (born 1967)

Personal information
- Full name: Steve Simmons
- Date of birth: August 9, 1967 (age 59)
- Place of birth: Vancouver, Washington, U.S.

Youth career
- 1983–1986: Chugiak Mustangs

College career
Years	Team	Apps	(Gls)
1987–1990	Concordia Cavaliers		

Managerial career
- 1990–1993: Concordia Cavaliers (assistant)
- 1994: Gonzaga Bulldogs (assistant)
- 1995: Whitworth Pirates
- 1996–2001: Linfield Wildcats (women)
- 1996–2001: Linfield Wildcats (men)
- 2001–2002: Oregon State Beavers (assistant)
- 2003–2008: Northern Illinois Huskies
- 2009–2017: Oregon State Beavers

Steve Simmons (born August 9, 1967) is an American soccer coach who is the Assistant Athletic Director and Director of Soccer with Linfield College in McMinnville, Oregon. Mr. Simmons is also a MLS Professional Match Evaluator since 2011 and a MLS Grassroots Instructor.

== Playing career ==
He played soccer at Chugiak High School. He was inducted into the Alaska High School Hall of Fame in 2014. He played soccer at Concordia University from 1987 to 1990 under head coach Dan Birkey. He was a first-team NCCAA All-American during his senior season. He was a two-time NAIA Northwest All-Regional Selection. He earned the Concordia's Male Athlete of the Year award in 1990. In 1993, he earned a spot on the school's Athletics Wall of Fame.

== Coaching career ==
=== Early coaching ===
He started his coaching career at his alma mater, Concordia University. He worked as an assistant under long-time head coach Dan Birkey from 1990 to 1993, before becoming an assistant at Gonzaga University. He got his first taste of head coaching experience in 1995, when he was named head soccer coach at Division III Whitworth College. In one season there, he compiled a 9-8-2 record and earned Northwest Conference Coach of the Year honors.

From 1996 to 2001, he served as both the men's and women's soccer coach at Division III Linfield College. He led Linfield to a 58-41-3 record over six seasons. He also coached the Linfield College Women's Lacrosse team from 1997-1999.

=== Northern Illinois ===
From 2003 to 2009, he coached the Northern Illinois University men's soccer program. He posted a 59-47-13 mark in six seasons, including 56 from 2004 to 2008. That five-year span set a new school record for victories during that timespan. The Huskies reached double digit wins in four out of his six seasons.

In 2004 and 2006, he won the MAC Coach of the Year award. He coached the 2006 team to a school record 15 wins, and a perfect 9–0 record in home games. In 2007, he led the Huskies to arguably the biggest upset in school history with a 2–1 double overtime win against ninth ranked Northwestern.

In 2008, Northern Illinois went 11-6-4, for a second-place finish in the Mid-American Conference. The Huskies also advanced to the MAC Tournament's championship game, before falling to top ranked Akron.

=== Oregon State ===
From 2001 to 2002, he served as the associate head soccer coach at Oregon State University. He was named head men's soccer coach at Oregon State later in 2009.

During his tenure as Head Coach, the Beaver's program produce three MLS First Round Draft Picks; Danny Mwanga No. 1 in 2010, Emery Welshman No. 13 in 2013 and Khiry Shelton No. 2 in 2015.

December 1, 2017 Steve was "let go" by Oregon State University. Steve compiled a record of 62-87-15 in his nine seasons as Head Coach of the Beavers Men's Soccer program.

=== Linfield College ===
In 2018 Steve joined the sporting staff at Linfield College in McMinnville Oregon as the Assistant Athletic Director and Director of Soccer.
