= Fred DeGand =

American soccer player

Personal information
- Full name: Frederic DeGand
- Date of birth: June 6, 1979 (age 47)
- Place of birth: Chicago, Illinois, United States
- Height: 6 ft 0 in (1.83 m)
- Position: Defender

Youth career
- Chicago Sockers

College career
Years	Team	Apps	(Gls)
1997–2000	Bowling Green Falcons		

Senior career*
Years	Team	Apps	(Gls)
2001	Hershey Wildcats	18	(0)
2001	→ D.C. United (loan)	0	(0)
2001	→ Reading Rage (loan)	2	(1)
2002	Cincinnati Riverhawks	13	(2)
2002	Hampton Roads Mariners	8	(0)
2003	Charleston Battery	21	(0)
2003–2005	Cleveland Force (indoor)	33	(2)
2004–2005	Atlanta Silverbacks	31	(3)
2005	Chicago Storm (indoor)	23	(7)
2005	Chicago Fire Reserves	2	(0)
2007–2010	Rockford Rampage (indoor)	37	(11)
2010–2011	Chicago Riot (indoor)	19	(6)
2012	Rockford Rampage (indoor)	1	(1)
2012–2013	Chicago Soul (indoor)	19	(6)
- * Club domestic league appearances and goals

Frederic DeGand (born June 6, 1979) is an American soccer defender who plays for Chicago Soul FC in the Major Indoor Soccer League. He played professionally in the USL A-League and National Professional Soccer League.

DeGand played youth soccer for the Chicago Sockers which won the 1995 D.J. Niotis (National U-16) Championship. He graduated from Deerfield High School. DeGand attended Bowling Green State University where he was a four-year starter on the Falcons soccer team. In 2001, he turned professional with the Hershey Wildcats of the USL A-League. On June 4, 2001, D.C. United called up DeGand for a game against the Kansas City Wizards. DeGand also went on loan to the Reading Rage of the USL D-3 Pro League. In March 2002, DeGand joined the Cincinnati Riverhawks. He finished the season with the Hampton Roads Mariners. In 2003, the Charleston Battery signed DeGand after he impressed them during a three-week trial. 2003- Cleveland Force On October 29, 2003, DeGand signed with the Cleveland Force. He spent a season and a half with the Force. On January 5, 2005, Cleveland traded DeGand to the Chicago Storm in exchange for Attila Vendegh. In 2004, DeGand joined the Atlanta Silverbacks. He also spent some time with them in 2005, but also played two games with the Chicago Fire Reserves. From 2005 to 2007, DeGand left soccer in order to recover from injuries, especially a torn anterior cruciate ligament. In 2007, he returned to playing with the Rockford Rampage in the American Indoor Soccer League. The Rampage won the league championship that season. In 2009, Rockford moved to the National Indoor Soccer League, losing to the Baltimore Blast in the championship series. DeGand continued to play for Rockford during the 2009–2010 season. He played 36 games, scoring 14 goals, in the two seasons the Rampage played in the NISL. In the fall of 2010, DeGand, along with about eight other Rampage players, joined the newly established Chicago Riot in the third Major Indoor Soccer League. In 2012, DeGand rejoined the Rampage, now playing in the Professional Arena Soccer League. He moved to the Chicago Soul FC of the MISL after only one game.
