= Hamady Diop =

Senegalese footballer (born 2002)

Personal information
- Date of birth: 6 June 2002 (age 24)
- Place of birth: Dakar, Senegal
- Height: 6 ft 0 in (1.83 m)
- Position: Defender

Team information
- Current team: Birmingham Legion
- Number: 32

Youth career
- 2018–2020: SIMA Águilas

College career
Years	Team	Apps	(Gls)
2020–2022	Clemson Tigers	42	(7)

Senior career*
Years	Team	Apps	(Gls)
2023–2024	Charlotte FC	3	(0)
2023–2024	Crown Legacy	11	(0)
2024	→ Čukarički (loan)	8	(0)
2025	San Diego FC	7	(0)
2025–2026	Rhode Island FC	14	(0)
2026–	Birmingham Legion	9	(0)
- * Club domestic league appearances and goals as of 23:45, 3 November 2026 (UTC)

Hamady Diop (born 6 June 2002) is a Senegalese professional footballer who plays as a defender for Birmingham Legion FC in the USL Championship.

Prior to Charlotte FC, Diop played college soccer for three seasons for Clemson University, where he helped the Tigers win the 2021 NCAA Division I men's soccer championship game. Diop played club soccer for Montverde Academy and for SIMA Águilas.

== Career ==
=== Youth and college ===
Diop played youth soccer for Montverde Academy and its affiliated soccer club, SIMA Águilas.

Ahead of the 2020 NCAA Division I men's soccer season, Diop signed a National Letter of Intent to play college soccer with Clemson University. There, he was a three-year starter. He finished his college career with 42 appearances, 40 of which were starts, and scored seven goals and provided three assists.

While at Clemson, Diop was named to the All-ACC Second-Team, the ACC All-Freshman Team, and the TopDrawer Soccer Top 100 Freshman for the 2020 season.

=== Professional ===
Ahead of the 2023 MLS SuperDraft, Diop signed a Generation adidas contract with Major League Soccer. On 21 December 2022, he was drafted first-overall by Charlotte FC. Diop became the second Clemson player to be drafted first overall, and the second in four years alongside Robbie Robinson, who was drafted first overall in the 2020 MLS SuperDraft. Diop also became the fourth ever African player to be selected first overall and the first Senegalese player to be drafted first overall.

On 13 July 2024, Diop moved on loan to Serbian SuperLiga side Čukarički until 15 January 2025.

On 11 December 2024, Diop was selected by San Diego FC in the 2024 MLS expansion draft. On 22 August 2025, Diop was waived by San Diego. He subsequently signed with USL Championship side Rhode Island FC on 9 September 2025.

In August 2026, Rhode Island FC announced they had agreed to transfer Diop to fellow USL Championship side Birmingham Legion FC for an undisclosed fee.
