= Esai Easley =

American soccer player

Personal information
- Date of birth: May 9, 2000 (age 26)
- Place of birth: Kailua-Kona, Hawaii, United States
- Height: 6 ft 0 in (1.83 m)
- Positions: Defender; midfielder

Youth career
- 2015–2017: Seattle Sounders FC
- 2017–2018: De Anza Force

College career
Years	Team	Apps	(Gls)
2018–2021	Grand Canyon Antelopes	43	(2)

Senior career*
Years	Team	Apps	(Gls)
2021	Portland Timbers U23s	7	(0)
2022	Sporting Kansas City II	22	(1)
- * Club domestic league appearances and goals as of September 23, 2022

Esai Easley (born May 9, 2000) is an American soccer player.

== Career ==
=== Youth ===
Easley born in Kailua-Kona, Hawaii played club soccer for local side Kona Crush, before heading to Europe in 2013 for trials with Manchester City, and again in 2014 for trials with Chievo and West Ham United. In 2015, Easley joined the Seattle Sounders FC academy, and then Californian side De Anza Force for their 2017–18 season.

=== College & amateur ===
In 2018, Easley committed to playing college soccer at Grand Canyon University. In four seasons with the 'Lopes, Easley made 43 appearances, scoring two goals and tallying four assists. In 2019, he was named an All-WAC Honorable mention, First team All-WAC in the 2020–2021 season, and WAC Defensive Player of the Year, All-WAC First Team, and was selected to the United Soccer Coaches All-Far West Region Second Team in his senior year in 2021.

While at college, Easley also appeared in the USL League Two with Portland Timbers U23s in 2021, making seven regular season appearances.

=== Professional ===
On January 11, 2022, Easley was selected 22nd overall in the 2022 MLS SuperDraft by Sporting Kansas City. He signed with the club's MLS Next Pro side Sporting Kansas City II on March 11, 2022.
