= 2021 Stanford Cardinal men's soccer team =

Men's soccer team

2021 Stanford Cardinal men's soccer
- Conference: Pac-12 Conference
- Record: 6–6–6 (2–4–4 Pac-12)
- Head coach: Jeremy Gunn (10th season)
- Assistant coaches: Oige Kennedy (6th season); Ben Moane (3rd season)
- Home stadium: Laird Q. Cagan Stadium

2021 Pac-12 Conference men's soccer standings
	Conf.					Overall
Team	W		L		T	W		L		T
No. 5 Oregon State †	7	–	1	–	2	14	–	2	–	4
No. 2 Washington +	6	–	1	–	2	18	–	2	–	2
No. 25 UCLA +	5	–	4	–	1	11	–	7	–	1
Stanford	2	–	4	–	4	6	–	6	–	6
San Diego State	2	–	7	–	0	8	–	7	–	2
California	1	–	6	–	1	3	–	9	–	3
† – Conference champion + – At-large invitation to the 2021 NCAA tournament; As of December 14, 2021; Rankings from United Soccer Coaches; Source: Pac-12

The 2021 Stanford Cardinal men's soccer team represented Stanford University during the 2021 NCAA Division I men's soccer season. They were led by tenth year head coach Jeremy Gunn.

== Previous season ==
The Cardinal played their 2020 season in early 2021 due to Covid-19. They finished conference play at 7–2–1, 1st place in the Pac-12 season and 10–3–1 overall. The Cardinal would win their second round match-up in the 2020 NCAA Tournament against Omaha in overtime, but would lose in the third round to North Carolina 0–1.

== Preseason Media polls ==
Predicted finish	Team	Votes (1st place)
1	Stanford	24 (4)
2	Washington	22 (2)
3	Oregon State	17
4	UCLA	11
5	California	10
6	San Diego State	6

== Roster ==
Source: Note: Flags indicate national team as defined under FIFA eligibility rules; some limited exceptions apply. Players may hold more than one non-FIFA nationality.

No.	Pos.	Nation	Player
2	DF	(United States) USA	Andrew Aprahamian
3	DF	(United States) USA	Keegan Tingey
4	MF	(United States) USA	Conner Maurer
5	DF	(United States) USA	Keegan Hughes
6	MF	(United States) USA	Mark Fisher
7	MF	(United States) USA	Will Richmond
8	MF	(United States) USA	Cam Cilley
9	FW	(United States) USA	Gabe Segal
10	FW	(England) ENG	Carlo Agostinelli
11	FW	(Burkina Faso) BFA	Ousseni Bouda
12	DF	(United States) USA	Ryan Ludwick
13	MF	(United States) USA	Shane de Flores
14	FW	(United States) USA	Zach Ryan
16	MF	(United States) USA	Layton Purchase

No.	Pos.	Nation	Player
17	MF	(United States) USA	Connor Evans
18	MF	(United States) USA	Aiden Weaver
19	FW	(United States) USA	Jackson Kiil
20	MF	(United States) USA	Will Reilly
21	DF	(United States) USA	Ryan Dunn
22	DF	(United States) USA	Rico Rei McMillan
23	MF	(Ghana) GHA	Kwabena Kwakwa
24	DF	(United States) USA	Nolan Evans
25	DF	(United States) USA	Noah Adnan
26	MF	(United States) USA	Philip Bogdanov
30	GK	(United States) USA	Eliot Jones
31	GK	(United States) USA	Kyle Orciuch
32	GK	(United States) USA	Jack Morris
33	GK	(United States) USA	Matt Frank

== Schedule ==
Date Time, TV	Rank^{#}	Opponent^{#}	Result	Record	Site (Attendance) City, State
Exhibition
August 21, 2021*; 4:00 pm, Pac-12 Insider	No. 8	Cal State Bakersfield	W 4–0	–	Laird Q. Cagan Stadium; Stanford, CA
August 21, 2021*; 7:00 pm, Pac-12 Insider	No. 8	Santa Clara	T 0–0	–	Laird Q. Cagan Stadium; Stanford, CA
Regular season
August 26, 2021*; 5:05 pm, ESPN+	No. 8	at SMU	L 1–3	0–1–0	Westcott Field (1,200); Dallas, TX
September 2, 2021*; 7:30 pm, WCC Network	No. 25	at Pacific	W 4–0	1–1–0	Knoles Field (650); Stockton, CA
September 6, 2021*; 7:00, Pac-12 Los Angeles	No. 25	UC Santa Barbara	W 2–1	2–1–0	Laird Q. Cagan Stadium (902); Stanford, CA
September 11, 2021*; 9:05 pm	No. 20	San Jose State	T 0–0 ^{2OT}	2–1–1	Laird Q. Cagan Stadium (1,135); Stanford, CA
September 16, 2021; 7:00 pm, P12N	No. 23	at UCLA	L 0–2	2–2–1 (0–1–0)	Wallis Annenberg Stadium (1,226); Los Angeles, CA
September 19, 2021; 3:00 pm, Aztec Digital Network	No. 23	at No. 21 San Diego State	L 0–1 ^{2OT}	2–3–1 (0–2–0)	SDSU Sports Deck; San Diego, CA
September 23, 2021*; 7:00 pm, Pac-12 Insider		UC Irvine	W 2–0	3–3–1	Laird Q. Cagan Stadium (723); Stanford, CA
September 27, 2021*; 7:00 pm, Pac-12 Insider		Saint Mary's	L 0–1 ^{2OT}	3–4–1	Laird Q. Cagan Stadium (429); Stanford, CA
October 3, 2021; 5:00 pm, P12N		California	W 5–0	4–4–1 (1–2–0)	Laird Q. Cagan Stadium (1,246); Stanford, CA
October 7, 2021; 7:00 pm, P12N		No. 2 Washington	L 1–3	4–5–1 (1–3–0)	Laird Q. Cagan Stadium (660); Stanford, CA
October 10, 2021; 2:00 pm, P12N		No. 15 Oregon State	T 2–2 ^{2OT}	4–5–2 (1–3–1)	Laird Q. Cagan Stadium (827); Stanford, CA
October 16, 2021*; 3:00 pm, Pioneers All-Access		at Denver	T 1–1 ^{2OT}	4–5–3	Denver Soccer Stadium (1,736); Denver, CO
October 21, 2021; 8:00 pm, P12N		San Diego State	W 4–0	5–5–3 (2–3–1)	Laird Q. Cagan Stadium (621); Stanford, CA
October 24, 2021; 2:30 pm, P12N		No. 22 UCLA	T 1–1	5–5–4 (2–3–2)	Laird Q. Cagan Stadium (1,204); Stanford, CA
October 28, 2021; 5:00 pm, P12N		at No. 3 Oregon State	L 0–1	5–6–4 (2–4–2)	Paul Lorenz Field (549); Corvallis, OR
October 31, 2021; 2:00 pm, P12N		at No. 4 Washington	T 0–0 ^{2OT}	5–6–5 (2–4–3)	Husky Soccer Stadium (1,490); Seattle, WA
November 4, 2021*; 7:00 pm		at San Francisco	W 1–0	6–6–5	Negoesco Stadium (827); San Francisco, CA
November 11, 2021; 1:00 pm, P12N		at California	T 1–1 ^{2OT}	6–6–6 (2–4–4)	Edwards Stadium (4,357); Berkeley, CA
*Non-conference game. ^{#}Rankings from United Soccer Coaches. (#) Tournament seedings in parentheses. All times are in Western.

== 2022 MLS Super Draft ==
Player	Team	Round	Pick #	Position
Ousseni Bouda	San Jose Earthquakes	1	8	FW

== Rankings ==
Ranking movements Legend: ██ Increase in ranking ██ Decrease in ranking — = Not ranked RV = Received votes
	Week																
Poll	Pre	1	2	3	4	5	6	7	8	9	10	11	12	13	14	15	Final
United Soccer	8	25	20	23	RV	RV	—	—	—	RV	—	—	Not released				
TopDrawer Soccer	7	7	14	13	14	—	—	—	—	—	—	—	—	—	—	—	—
College Soccer News	8	12	11	16	RV	RV	—	—	—	—	—	—	—	—	Not released		
