= Ryan Sailor =

American soccer player (born 1998)

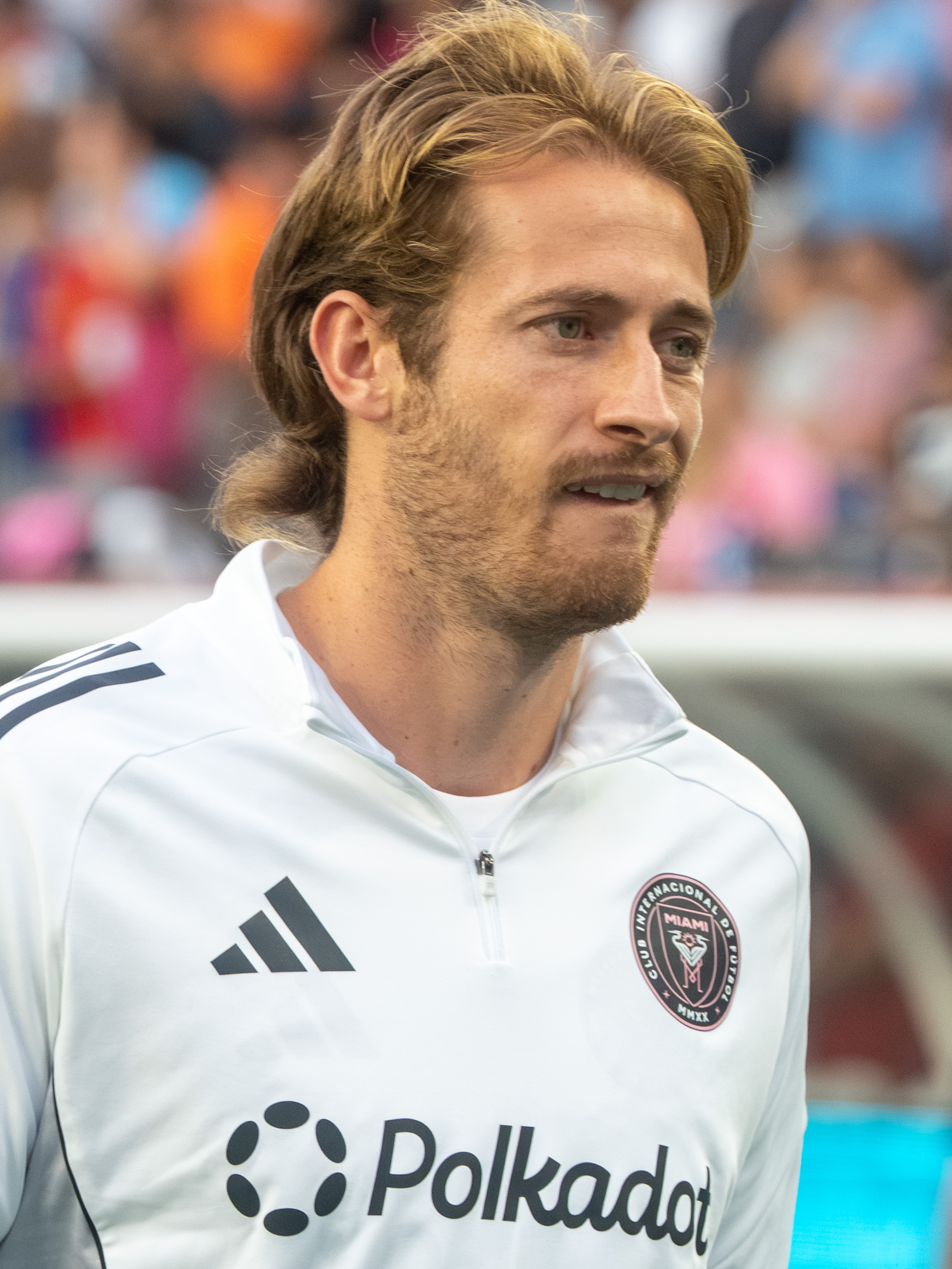
- Sailor with Inter Miami in 2025

Personal information
- Full name: Ryan Joseph Sailor
- Date of birth: November 27, 1998 (age 27)
- Place of birth: Centennial, Colorado, U.S.
- Height: 6 ft 4 in (1.93 m)
- Position: Defender

Team information
- Current team: Seattle Sounders
- Number: 4

Youth career
- 2013–2016: Real Colorado

College career
Years	Team	Apps	(Gls)
2016–2021	Washington Huskies	49	(10)

Senior career*
Years	Team	Apps	(Gls)
2022–2025	Inter Miami	44	(0)
2022–2025	→ Inter Miami II (loan)	12	(1)
2026–	Seattle Sounders	0	(0)
- * Club domestic league appearances and goals as of December 17, 2025

Ryan Joseph Sailor (born November 27, 1998) is an American professional soccer player who plays as a defender for Major League Soccer club Seattle Sounders.

== Career ==
=== Youth and college ===
Ryan Sailor attended Arapahoe High School in Centennial, CO. He played club soccer for Real Colorado who he helped lead to the Region IV semi-finals and the Colorado state club championship in 2013. Sailor served as Real Colorado's team captain in United States Development Academy play from 2013 to 2016.

Sailor attended the University of Washington to play college soccer from 2016 to 2021. He saw limited action during first three years at Washington, redshirting his freshman season and only making two appearances from 2016 to 2018. Sailor saw significantly higher action during his final three seasons at Washington, going on to finish his Husky career with 49 total appearances which included 10 goals and 3 assists. His final season in 2021 saw Sailor named as the Pac-12 Defensive Player of the Year, 1st Team All-Conference for the PAC-12, 1st Team All-America, and a semi-finalist for the MAC Herman Trophy. During his final three seasons, Sailor captained the Huskies to three consecutive NCAA Elite 8 appearances and ended his career as the runner up in the 2021 College Cup National Championship to the Clemson Tigers.

During his time at college, Sailor was named to the roster for USL PDL side Colorado Rapids U23, but didn't make an appearance for the team.

=== Professional ===
On January 11, 2022, Sailor was selected 9th overall in the 2022 MLS SuperDraft by Inter Miami. He signed with the Major League Soccer club on February 22, 2022. Sailor made his MLS debut on May 7, 2022, starting in a 1–0 loss away to Charlotte FC. On April 26, 2023, Sailor scored his first professional goal when he scored the equalizing goal against Miami FC in the U.S. Open Cup. Inter Miami would ultimately win on penalties. On December 11, 2025, Inter Miami announced that they would allow his contract to expire.

Six days later, Sailor was signed by the Seattle Sounders through the 2026 season with a club option for another year.

== Honors ==
Inter Miami

- Leagues Cup: 2023
- Supporters' Shield: 2024
- Eastern Conference (MLS): 2025
- MLS Cup: 2025
