= Callum Johnson (soccer) =

American soccer player (born 1997)

Personal information
- Date of birth: November 1, 1997 (age 29)
- Place of birth: New York, New York, United States
- Height: 1.76 m (5 ft 9 in)
- Position: Midfielder

Youth career
- –2015: BW Gottschee
- 2015–2016: New York Red Bulls

College career
Years	Team	Apps	(Gls)
2016–2019	Boston College Eagles	52	(8)
2020–2021	Clemson Tigers	43	(8)

Senior career*
Years	Team	Apps	(Gls)
2019	New York Red Bulls U23	0	(0)
2022	LA Galaxy II	5	(1)
2023–2025	One Knoxville	77	(4)
- * Club domestic league appearances and goals as of October 31, 2025

Callum Johnson (born November 1, 1997) is an American soccer player who plays as a midfielder.

== Career ==
=== Youth ===
Johnson attended the Collegiate School, playing club soccer for BW Gottschee, before spending a year with the New York Red Bulls academy from 2015.

=== College ===
Johnson initially attended Boston College to play college soccer. He played three seasons for the Eagles between 2016 and 2018, making 52 appearances, scoring eight goals and tallying ten assists, missing the 2019 season due to injury. In 2017, he was named Boston College's Male Sophomore Scholar-Athlete of the Year. In 2020, Johnson transferred to Clemson University, where he made 43 appearances for the Tigers, scoring eight goals and adding nine assists. Johnson helped the Tigers win an Atlantic Coast Conference (ACC) Championship in 2020 over the Pittsburgh Panthers with his assist in their 2-1 win. The following year Johnson helped the Tigers win the 2021 NCAA Men’s Soccer National Championship.

In 2019, Johnson was part of the New York Red Bulls U-23 side who compete in the USL League Two, but didn't make an appearance for them.

=== Professional ===
On January 11, 2022, Johnson was selected 42nd overall in the 2022 MLS SuperDraft by LA Galaxy. He was announced as a signing for club's USL Championship side on March 3, 2022. He made his debut for LA Galaxy II on June 18, 2022, appearing as a 68th–minute substitute during a 2–0 loss to Sacramento Republic. Johnson scored his first professional goal on July 15, 2022 against the Colorado Springs Switchbacks FC.

Johnson signed with USL League One expansion club One Knoxville on January 26, 2023.
