= Oskar Ågren =

Swedish footballer (born 1998)

Personal information
- Full name: Oskar Erik Ågren
- Date of birth: 10 September 1998 (age 28)
- Place of birth: Malmö, Sweden
- Height: 1.91 m (6 ft 3 in)
- Position: Centre-back

Team information
- Current team: GAIS
- Number: 4

Youth career
- –2014: LB07

College career
Years	Team	Apps	(Gls)
2019–2021	Clemson Tigers	61	(6)

Senior career*
Years	Team	Apps	(Gls)
2014–2021	LB07	94	(7)
2022–2023	San Jose Earthquakes	3	(0)
2022	→ San Jose Earthquakes II	3	(0)
2023	→ Switchbacks FC (loan)	21	(0)
2024	Brage	29	(0)
2025–	GAIS	35	(1)
- * Club domestic league appearances and goals as of 8 July 2026

Oskar Erik Ågren (born 10 September 1998) is a Swedish professional footballer who plays as a centre-back for GAIS.

== Career ==
=== Youth, College & Amateur ===
Ågren played semi-professionally for LB07's first team from 2014. In 2019, Ågren moved to the United States to play college soccer at Clemson University. In three seasons with the Tigers, he made 61 appearances, scoring six goals and tallying seven assists, also earning numerous honours including; All-ACC Academic Team member in 2019, Second-team All-ACC in 2020, First-team All-ACC in 2021, and was a MAC Hermann Trophy Finalist. Whilst at college in the United States, Ågren continued to play with LB07 in Sweden during the summer.

=== Professional ===
On 11 January 2022, Ågren was drafted 13th overall in the 2022 MLS SuperDraft by San Jose Earthquakes after acquiring the pick from D.C. United for a second-round selection and $100k in General Allocation Money. On 18 February 2022, he signed with the Major League Soccer side on a deal with club options until 2025. During his first season with San Jose, Ågren appeared for San Jose Earthquakes II in the MLS Next Pro.

On 13 April 2023, Ågren was loaned to USL Championship side Colorado Springs Switchbacks for the remainder of the 2023 season.

On 7 February 2024, Ågren signed a two-year contract with Brage in Superettan.

== Personal life ==
Oskar is the son of former Swedish footballer Per Ågren.
