= Northern Illinois Huskies men's soccer =

American college soccer team

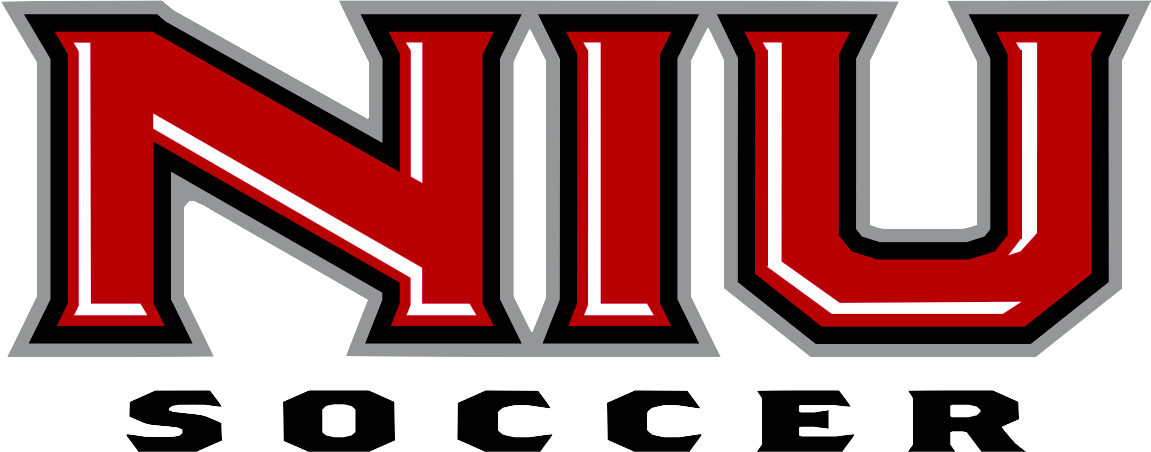
- Founded: 1962; 64 years ago
- University: Northern Illinois University
- Head coach: Ryan Swan (6th season)
- Conference: Horizon
- Location: DeKalb, Illinois, US
- Stadium: NIU Soccer Complex (capacity: 1,500)
- Nickname: Huskies
- Colors: Cardinal and black
Home	Away

NCAA tournament Round of 16
- 1973

NCAA tournament Round of 32
- 1973, 2006, 2011, 2021

NCAA tournament appearances
- 1973, 2006, 2011, 2021

Conference tournament championships
- 1989 (BCSC); 2006, 2011, 2021 (MAC)

Conference regular season championships
- 1984 (MMC); 1990 (Mid-Con); 2006, 2021 (MAC)

The Northern Illinois Huskies men's soccer team is the college soccer team that represents Northern Illinois University (NIU) in DeKalb, Illinois, United States. The school's team competed in NIU's full-time home of the Mid-American Conference (MAC) through the 2022 season, after which the conference stopped sponsoring men's soccer. NIU moved that sport to the Missouri Valley Conference (MVC) effective with the 2023 season, joining fellow MAC members Bowling Green and Western Michigan in this move. NIU men's soccer started playing in 1962 and has appeared in the NCAA Tournament four times (1973, 2006, 2011, 2021). The Huskies are coached by Ryan Swan.

The 2025 season is the Huskies' last in the MVC. On July 1, 2026, NIU will rejoin the Horizon League, in which it had been a member from 1994 to 1997 (1994–1996 seasons).

== Season-by-season records ==
Record table
Season	Coach	Overall	Conference	Standing	Postseason
Bob Kahler (Independent) (1962–1962)
1962	Bob Kahler	0–5			
Bob Kahler:		0–5			
William Healey (Independent) (1963–1968)
1963	William Healey	3–4			
1964	William Healey	3–4			
1965	William Healey	0–5			
1966	William Healey	2–3			
1967	William Healey	6–1			
1968	William Healey	8–1			
William Healey:		22–18			
Dave Bucher (Independent) (1969–1979)
1969	Dave Bucher	8–1			
1970	Dave Bucher	6–3–2			
1971	Dave Bucher	7–2–1			
1972	Dave Bucher	3–5–2			
1973	Dave Bucher	7–2–2			NCAA Round of 16
1974	Dave Bucher	5–2–3			
1975	Dave Bucher	6–5			
1976	Dave Bucher	7–3–2			
1977	Dave Bucher	7–4			
1978	Dave Bucher	7–2–3			
1979	Dave Bucher	6–7–1			
Dave Bucher:		69–36–16			
John LeWang (Independent) (1980–1980)
1980	John LeWang	5–7–2			
John LeWang:		5–7–2			
Jerry Collins (Midwest Metro) (1981–1986)
1981	Jerry Collins	4–9–2	1–2	3rd	
1982	Jerry Collins	7–9–1	3–1–1	T–2nd	
1983	Jerry Collins	8–7–2	4–1	2nd	
1984	Jerry Collins	13–5–1	5–0	1st	
1985	Jerry Collins	8–10–2	3–1	2nd	
1986	Jerry Collins	6–12–1	1–3–1	T–5th	
Jerry Collins:		45–52–9	17–7–2		
Willy Roy (Big Central) (1987–1989)
1987	Willy Roy	6–10–2	1–3	5th	
1988	Willy Roy	7–10–1	0–6	7th	
1989	Willy Roy	14–4–2	4–2	3rd	
Willy Roy (Mid-Con) (1990–1993)
1990	Willy Roy	13–5–2	6–1	1st	
1991	Willy Roy	11–5–3	5–2–1	3rd	
1992	Willy Roy	6–9–2	3–3–1	4th	
1993	Willy Roy	11–6–2	4–2–2	4th	
Willy Roy (MCC) (1994–1996)
1994	Willy Roy	10–7–1	5–3–1	3rd	
1995	Willy Roy	7–10–2	3–5	6th	
1996	Willy Roy	8–9–1	3–4–1	4th	
Willy Roy (MAC) (1997–2002)
1997	Willy Roy	10–9–1	2–4–1	6th	
1998	Willy Roy	12–4–1	5–3	3rd	
1999	Willy Roy	12–9	3–4	T–5th	
2000	Willy Roy	7–9	3–3	5th	
2001	Willy Roy	4–12–1	1–5	7th	
2002	Willy Roy	4–13–1	2–4	6th	
Willy Roy:		142–131–22	50–54–7		
Steve Simmons (MAC) (2003–2008)
2003	Steve Simmons	3–12–2	2–4	5th	
2004	Steve Simmons	12–7	4–2	T–2nd	
2005	Steve Simmons	11–6–2	4–2	2nd	
2006	Steve Simmons	15–6–1	4–1	1st	NCAA Round of 32
2007	Steve Simmons	7–9–4	1–3–1	5th	
2008	Steve Simmons	11–6–4	4–1–1	2nd	
Steve Simmons:		59–47–13	19–13–2		
Eric Luzzi (MAC) (2009–2016)
2009	Eric Luzzi	10–8–1	3–3	4th	
2010	Eric Luzzi	9–6–2	2–4	5th	
2011	Eric Luzzi	15–6	4–1	2nd	NCAA Round of 32
2012	Eric Luzzi	7–10–3	4–2–1	T–2nd	
2013	Eric Luzzi	4–13–1	0–5–1	7th	
2014	Eric Luzzi	3–9–5	0–4–1	6th	
2015	Eric Luzzi	7–7–1	1–3–1	5th	
2016	Eric Luzzi	2–10–4	1–3–1	5th	
Eric Luzzi:		57–69–17	15–25–5		
Ryan Swan (MAC) (2017–2022)
2017	Ryan Swan	3–11-1	0-4-1	6th	
2018	Ryan Swan	8–9-1	1-4-0	6th	
2019	Ryan Swan	7–10-1	2-3-0	T-4th	
2020-21	Ryan Swan	5–8-1	4-6-0	5th	
2021	Ryan Swan	15–3-2	4-0-2	1st	NCAA Round of 32
2022	Ryan Swan	5–8-4	2-5-1	4th	
Ryan Swan (MVC) (2023–2025)
2023	Ryan Swan	7-9-1	3-4-1	T-5th	
2024	Ryan Swan	3-12-1	1-6-1	9th (Last)	
Ryan Swan:		53–70–12	17–32–6		
Total:		452–435–91			
National champion Postseason invitational champion Conference regular season champion Conference regular season and conference tournament champion Division regular season champion Division regular season and conference tournament champion Conference tournament champion

- Source: NIU Men's Soccer Record Book

== NCAA tournament ==
The Huskies have appeared in four NCAA Tournaments. Their combined record is 3–4.

Year	Round	Opponent	Result	NIU Head Coach
1973	Round of 16	SIU Edwardsville	L 3–0	Dave Bucher
2006	First round Second Round	Loyola Chicago (7) Indiana	W 1–0 (OT); L 1–0	Steve Simmons
2011	First round Second Round	Western Illinois (2) Creighton	W 3–0; L 3–0	Eric Luzzi
2021	First round Second Round	Oaklnd; Pittsburgh(5)	W 2–1; L 5–2	Ryan Swan

== Lewang Cup ==
Since 1981, the winner of the annual match between NIU and UW-Milwaukee claims the John Lewang Memorial Cup. The trophy is named in honor of former NIU coach John Lewang, who was killed in a car accident prior to the 1981 season. Lewang came to NIU as head coach in 1980 following his time as an assistant at UW-Milwaukee and died in a car accident after his first season leading the Huskies.

=== Match results ===
NIU victories	Milwaukee victories

No.	Date	Location	Winner	Score
1	1981	DeKalb, IL	Milwaukee	3–1
2	1982	Milwaukee, WI	Milwaukee	4–3
3	1983	DeKalb, IL	NIU	3–2
4	1984	Milwaukee, WI	Milwaukee	4–2
5	1985	DeKalb, IL	NIU	3–1
6	1986	Milwaukee, WI	Milwaukee	4–1
7	1987	DeKalb, IL	NIU	1–0
8	1988	Milwaukee, WI	Milwaukee	2–1
9	1989	Milwaukee, WI	Milwaukee	2–1
10	1990	DeKalb, IL	Tie	2–2
11	1991	Milwaukee, WI	NIU	5–1
12	1992	DeKalb, IL	Milwaukee	3–0
13	1993	Milwaukee, WI	Milwaukee	3–1
14	1994	DeKalb, IL	NIU	3–2
15	1995	Milwaukee, WI	Milwaukee	2–1
16	1996	DeKalb, IL	Milwaukee	1–0
17	1997	Milwaukee, WI	NIU	3–2
18	1998	DeKalb, IL	NIU	2–0
19	1999	Milwaukee, WI	NIU	3–1
20	2000	DeKalb, IL	Milwaukee	4–2
21	2001	Milwaukee, WI	Milwaukee	3–0
22	2002	DeKalb, IL	Milwaukee	1–0

No.	Date	Location	Winner	Score
23	2003	Madison, WI	Milwaukee	2–0
24	2004	Milwaukee, WI	Milwaukee	1–0
25	2005	DeKalb, IL	Milwaukee	1–0
26	2006	Milwaukee, WI	NIU	1–0
27	2007	DeKalb, IL	NIU	1–0
28	2008	Milwaukee, WI	Tie	2–2
29	2009	DeKalb, IL	NIU	5–1
30	2010	Milwaukee, WI	NIU	5–1
31	2011	Milwaukee, WI	Milwaukee	1–0
32	2012	Evanston, IL	Milwaukee	1–0
33	2013	DeKalb, IL	Milwaukee	1–0
34	2014	Milwaukee, WI	Tie	2–2
35	2015	DeKalb, IL	Milwaukee	2–1
36	2016	Milwaukee, WI	NIU	2–1
37	2017	DeKalb, IL	Milwaukee	1–0
38	2018	Milwaukee, WI	NIU	2–1
39	2019	DeKalb, IL	NIU	1–0
40	2021	Milwaukee, WI	NIU	4–0
41	2022	DeKalb, IL	NIU	3–2
42	2023	Milwaukee, WI	Milwaukee	3–2
43	2024	DeKalb, IL	Milwaukee	2–0
Series: Milwaukee leads 23–17–3

== Honours ==
- Mid-American Conference tournament:
  - Winners (3): 2006, 2011, 2021
  - Runners-up (3): 1999, 2008, 2012
- Mid-American Conference regular season:
  - Winners (2): 2006, 2021
  - Runners-up (5): 2004, 2005, 2008, 2011, 2012
- Mid-Continent Conference regular season:
  - Winners (1): 1990
- Big Central Soccer Conference tournament:
  - Winners (1): 1989
- Midwest Metropolitan Conference regular season:
  - Winners (1): 1984
  - Runners-up (3): 1982, 1983, 1985

== Honors ==
=== All-Americans ===
NIU men's soccer has had seven players named to All-America teams, including two NCAA First-Team All-Americans.

Year	Player	Position	Team
1970	(United States) Allan Zelechowski	Sweeper	Honorable Mention
1971	(United States) Edward Kositzki	Forward	Honorable Mention
1974	(United States) Peter Mannos	Goalkeeper	First-Team
1975	(United States) Peter Mannos	Goalkeeper	First-Team
1975	(United States) Paul Wenson	Midfielder	Second-Team
1976	(United States) Mike Strahler	Defender	Honorable Mention
1984	(Norway) Johan Bergseth	Forward	Third-Team

=== Academic All-Americans ===
NIU men's soccer has had a combined 13 players named to CoSIDA and NSCAA Academic All-America teams, including four First-Team Academic All-Americans.

Year	Player	Position	Organization	Team
1989	(United States) Markus Roy	Goalkeeper	NSCAA	Honorable Mention
1990	(United States) Markus Roy	Goalkeeper	NSCAA	First-Team
1991	(United States) Markus Roy	Goalkeeper	NSCAA	First-Team
1996	(Norway) Sigurd Slaastad	Midfielder	CoSIDA	Second-Team
1997	(Norway) Sigurd Slaastad	Midfielder	CoSIDA	Second-Team
1998	(United States) Jeff Stojak	Midfielder	CoSIDA	Second-Team
1999	(United States) Jeff Stojak	Midfielder	CoSIDA	First-Team
2000	(United States) Peter Agrimson	Defender	NSCAA	Second-Team
2002	(United States) Peter Agrimson	Defender	NSCAA	Second-Team
2003	(United States) Andy Champion	Defender	CoSIDA	Second-Team
2008	(United States) Kyle Knotek	Midfielder	CoSIDA	Second-Team
2010	(United States) Kyle Knotek	Midfielder	CoSIDA	First-Team
2014	(United States) Dusty Page	Defender	CoSIDA	Second-Team

=== Freshman All-Americans ===
NIU men's soccer has had two players named to College Soccer News All-Freshman teams.

Year	Player	Position	Team
2004	(United States) Curt Zastrow	Forward	Second-Team
2008	(United States) Brad Horton	Midfielder	Second-Team

=== Coaches of the Year ===
NIU men's soccer has had three head coaches named Coach of the Year by the conference.

Year	Head Coach	Conference
1990	(United States) Willy Roy	Mid-Continent
2004	(United States) Steve Simmons	MAC
2006	(United States) Steve Simmons	MAC
