= George Marks (soccer, born 1999) =

American soccer player (born 1999)

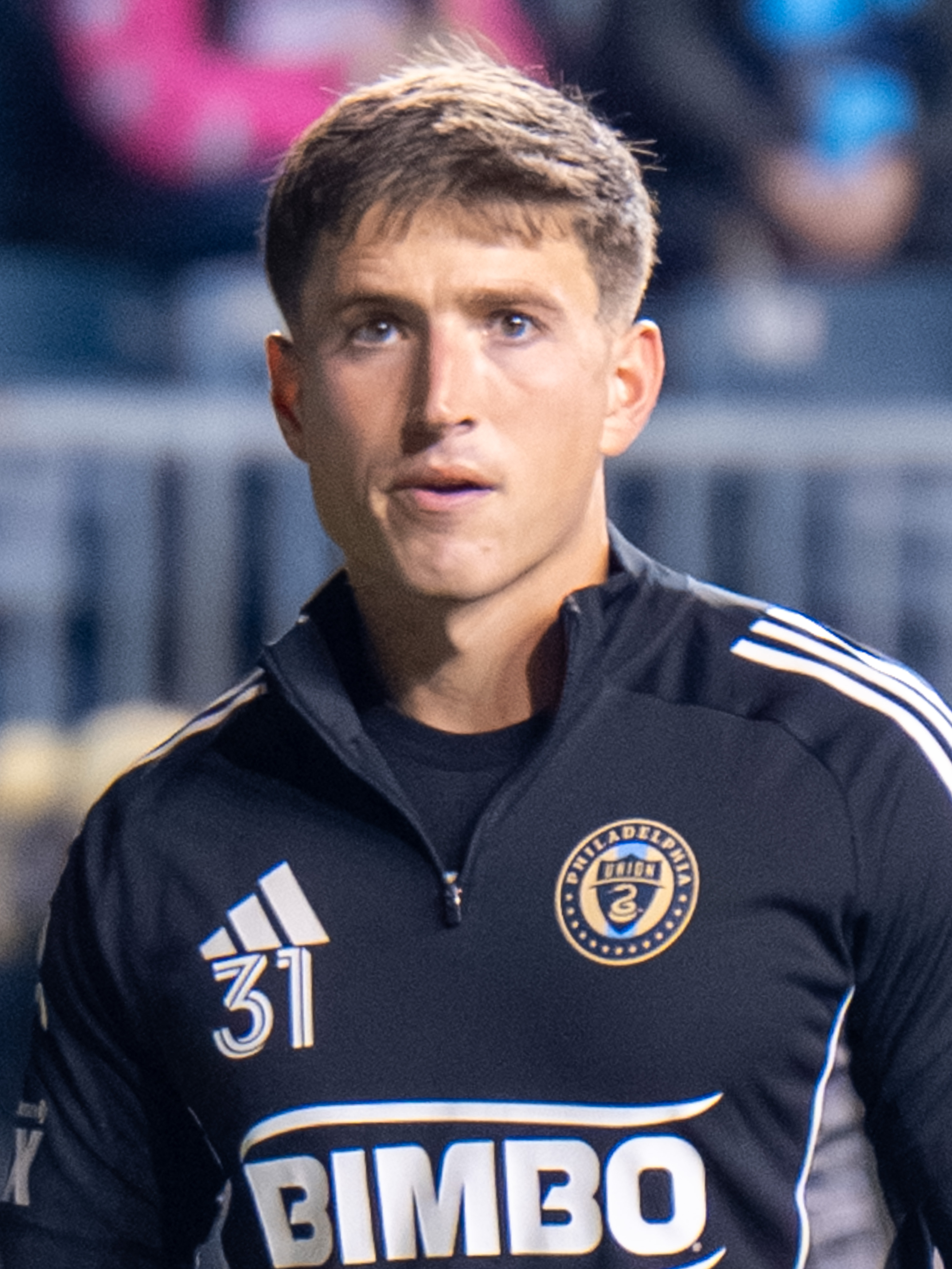
- Marks with the Philadelphia Union in 2025

Personal information
- Full name: George Henry Marks
- Date of birth: November 10, 1999 (age 26)
- Place of birth: Baton Rouge, Louisiana, United States
- Height: 6 ft 1 in (1.85 m)
- Position: Goalkeeper

Team information
- Current team: Philadelphia Union
- Number: 31

Youth career
- 2015–2018: North Carolina FC

College career
Years	Team	Apps	(Gls)
2018–2021	Clemson Tigers	69	(0)

Senior career*
Years	Team	Apps	(Gls)
2017–2018	North Carolina FC	0	(0)
2018	North Carolina FC U23	7	(0)
2021	North Carolina FC U23	4	(0)
2022–2025	Charlotte FC	8	(0)
2023–2025	Crown Legacy	9	(0)
2024	→ Las Vegas Lights (loan)	2	(0)
2025–	Philadelphia Union	0	(0)
2025–	Philadelphia Union II	0	(0)
- * Club domestic league appearances and goals as of August 27, 2025

George Henry Marks (born November 10, 1999) is an American professional soccer player who plays as a goalkeeper for the Philadelphia Union of Major League Soccer.

== Career ==
=== Youth ===
Marks joined the North Carolina FC academy in 2015, where he played until 2018. He was named as an amateur player with the team during their 2017 season in the NASL, and On December 14, 2017, it was announced Marks had signed a USL academy contract for the 2018 season with the first team in the United Soccer League, allowing Marks to retain his NCAA eligibility.

=== College ===
Marks attended Clemson University to play college soccer. In four seasons with the Tigers, Marks made 69 appearances, placing him as 3rd in Clemson history for goalkeeper wins (47), 7th in best goals allowed average (0.90 per game) and tied 3rd in most solo shutouts and most minutes. In 2019, he was named All-Atlantic Coast Conference (ACC) Academic Team, Second-team All-South Region, Second-team All-ACC, and CoSIDA Academic All-District. 2020 saw Marks earn Third-team All-ACC honors, All-ACC Academic Team and CoSIDA Academic All-District, and in 2021, Second-team All-ACC, All-ACC Academic Team, CoSIDA Academic All District and Third-team All-South Region. In 2021 Marks also captained the Clemson national championship team and was named Most Outstanding Defensive Player for the NCAA tournament.

=== Amateur ===
While at college, Marks had two spells with North Carolina FC U23 in the USL League Two. In 2018, he made seven appearances and in 2021 made four appearances.

=== Professional ===
On January 11, 2022, Marks was selected 57th overall in the 2022 MLS SuperDraft by Charlotte FC. Marks officially signed with the Major League Soccer side on February 22, 2022. He made his professional debut on April 20, 2022, starting in a 2–1 win after extra-time in a Lamar Hunt U.S. Open Cup fixture against Greenville Triumph SC.

On August 27, 2025, Marks signed with Philadelphia Union for the remainder of the 2025 MLS season.

== Honors ==
Philadelphia Union

- Supporters' Shield: 2025
