= Bowling Green Falcons men's soccer =

American college soccer team

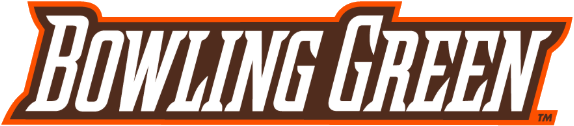
- Founded: 1965; 61 years ago
- University: Bowling Green State University
- Head coach: Eric Nichols
- Conference: MVC
- Location: Bowling Green, Ohio, US
- Stadium: Mickey Cochrane Stadium (capacity: 1,500)
- Nickname: Falcons
- Colors: Brown and orange
Home	Away

NCAA tournament Round of 16
- 1972, 1973, 1995

NCAA tournament appearances
- 1972, 1973, 1991, 1992, 1995, 1996, 1997, 2020, 2021, 2026

Conference tournament championships
- 1991, 1995, 1996, 1997, 2026

Conference regular season championships
- 1987, 1989, 1991, 1992, 1996, 2000, 2002, 2020, 2026

The Bowling Green Falcons men's soccer team is the National Collegiate Athletic Association (NCAA) Division I intercollegiate college soccer team of Bowling Green State University located in Bowling Green, Ohio.

== Roster ==
As of Jul 2026

Note: Flags indicate national team as defined under FIFA eligibility rules; some limited exceptions apply. Players may hold more than one non-FIFA nationality.

No.	Pos.	Nation	Player
1	GK	BRA	Enzo Gil
2	DF	USA	Gus Peacock
3	DF	USA	Aidan Flanders
5	MF	DEN	Mads Christensen
6	MF	BRA	Caue Ramos
7	FW	USA	Namik Mehic
8	MF	USA	Joshua Saavedra
9	FW	USA	Tyson McCoy
10	MF	USA	Aiden Ptacek
12	FW	USA	Joshua Pedersen
13	DF	USA	Xavier Sims
14	DF	USA	Bright Asante

No.	Pos.	Nation	Player
15	DF	BRA	Matheus Filipe
16	MF	USA	Sawyer Wilbanks
17	DF	USA	Saul Rios
18	FW	USA	Michael Lindh
20	DF	USA	Diego Ramirez
22	FW	USA	J Mossholder
23	FW	USA	Tomas Meek
24	FW	USA	Lucas Brinkman
25	FW	USA	Luciano Perez-Carnuda
27	DF	SEN	Mouhamadou Cisse
28	GK	USA	Will Schutte
30	GK	USA	Jason Ball
33	GK	USA	Marshall DeGraff

== History ==
Bowling Green State University first fielded a men's soccer team in 1965. The team initially competed as an independent.

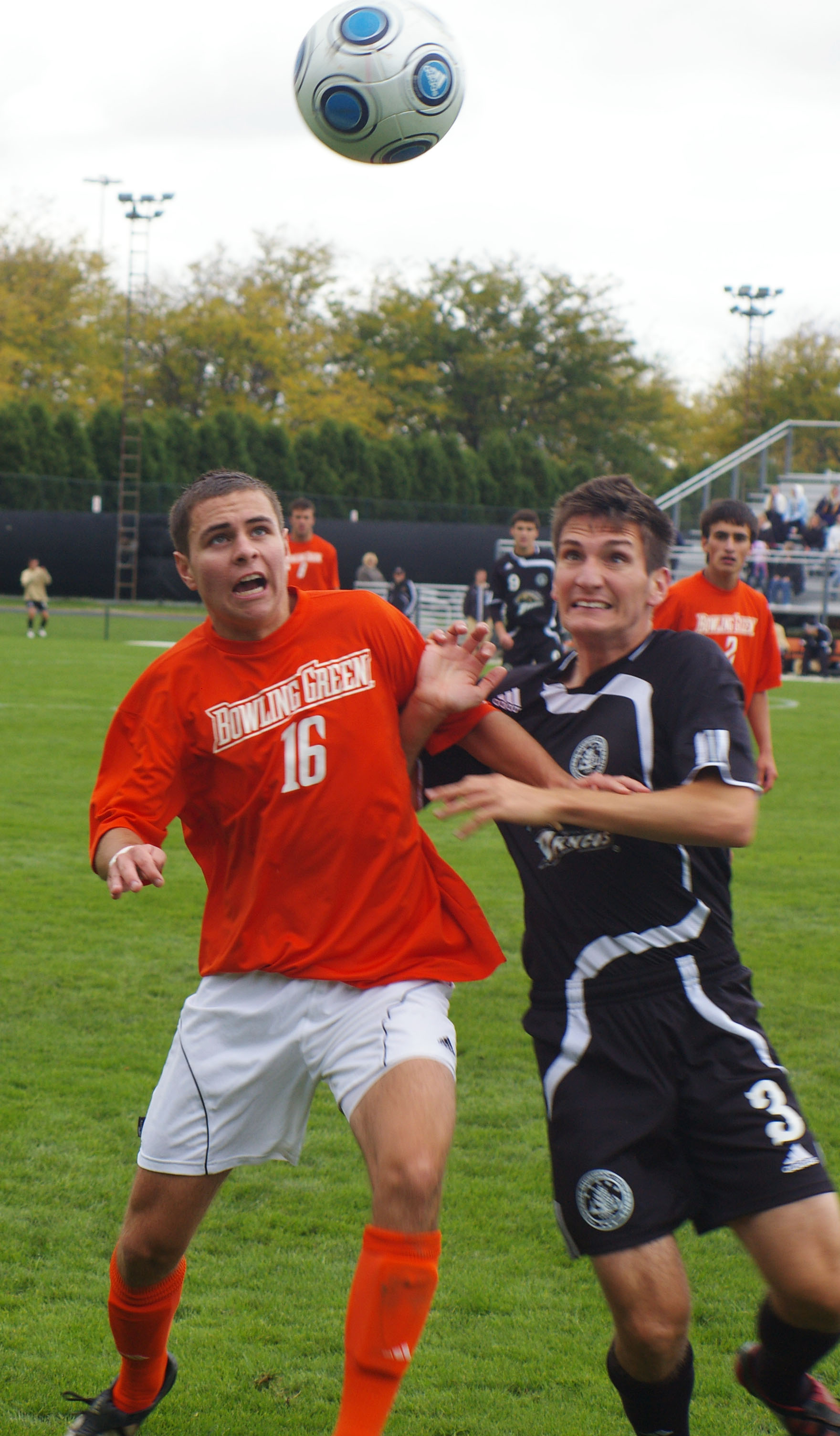
A Bowling Green match in 2007

From 1986 through 1992, the Falcons were a member of the Mid-America Soccer Conference, winning the season championship in 1987, 1989, 199, and 1992 and the conference's only tournament championship in 1991.

From 1993 through 2022, BGSU competed as a member of the Mid-American Conference. They won the regular season title in 1986, 2000, 2002, and 2020. The Falcons won the first three MAC Tournament championships in 1985–87, and have advanced to the title game more than five times since then.

The team played in BGSU's full-time home of the Mid-American Conference through the 2022 season, after which the MAC dropped that sport. Bowling Green joined the Missouri Valley Conference as a single-sport member effective in 2023.

== Colors and badge ==
The BGSU school colors are burnt orange and seal brown. In 1914, Professor Leon Winslow of the industrial arts department reportedly saw the color combination on a woman's hat while riding the interurban trolley to Toledo and recommended to the board of trustees that those colors be adopted.

== Stadium ==
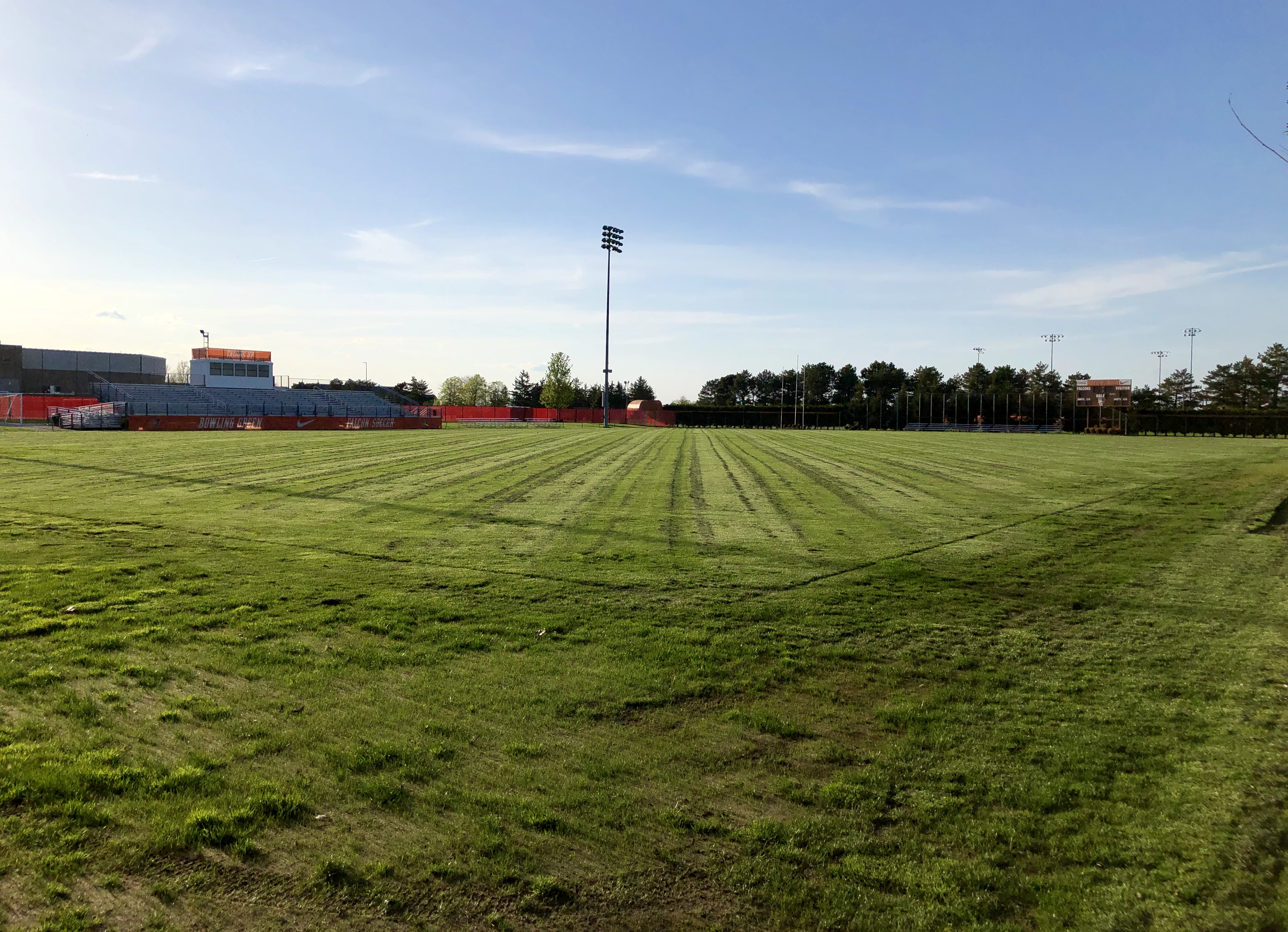
Mickey Cochrane Stadium, venue

The Falcons play at Mickey Cochrane Field (Cochrane Soccer Stadium) on the BGSU campus. The stadium seats 700 with portable seating for 800 more available and standing room for hundreds more.

== Rivalries ==
Bowling Green's main college soccer rival is Wright State. The two compete for the I-75 Cup.

== Honors ==
Source: More than 30 BGSU Falcons have gone on to play professional soccer

Bowling Green men's soccer's first head coach, Mickey Cochrane, was inducted into the NSCAA (National Soccer Coaches Association of America, now known as United Soccer Coaches) Hall of Fame in 1995.

All-Americans

- Dave Dyminski – 1972 NSCAA Honorable Mention, 1973 NSCAA 2nd Team
- Bud Lewis – 1974 NSCAA Honorable Mention
- Dennis Mepham – 1979 NSCAA Honorable Mention
- Neil Ridgway – 1982 NSCAA 1st Team, 1983 NSCAA 1st Team
- Jon Felton – 1987 NSCAA 3rd Team
- Rob Martella – 1992 NSCAA 1st Team
- Steve Klein – 1996 NSCAA 1st Team
- Scott Vallow – 1997 NSCAA 3rd Team, 1998 NSCAA 3rd Team
- Chris Doré – 1999 NSCAA 3rd Team

Academic All-Americans

- Kyle Royer – 1988 ISAA adidas Scholar-Athlete All-American. 1989 ISAA adidas Scholar-Athlete All-American, 1990 ISAA adidas Scholar-Athlete All-American
- Greg Murphy – 1991 ISAA adidas Scholar-Athlete All-American. 1991 CoSIDA Academic All-American
- Joe Burch – 1995 CoSIDA Academic All-American, 1995 NSCAA Scholar-Athlete All-American Honorable Mention, 1996 CoSIDA 1st Team Academic All-American
- Ty Fowler – 1999 CoSIDA 1st Team Academic All-American
- Jacob Lawrence – 2009 ESPN The Magazine Academic All-America First Team
- Brandon Silva – 2013 CoSIDA 2nd Team Academic All-American
- Pat Flynn – 2014 CoSIDA 2nd Team Academic All-American, 2015 CoSIDA 1st Team Academic All-American, 2016 CoSIDA 1st Team Academic All-American
- Joe Sullivan – 2015 CoSIDA 2nd Team Academic All-American, 2016 CoSIDA 1st Team Academic All-American

== Notable alumni ==
- Thaddeus Atalig
- George Davis IV
- Fred DeGand
- Cameron Hepple
- Steve Klein
- Dennis Mepham
- Scott Vallow
- Dana Veth
- Kyle Williams
- Bud Lewis
