= 2019 Marshall Thundering Herd men's soccer team =

American college soccer season

2019 Marshall Thundering Herd men's soccer

Conference USA Regular Season Champions Conference USA Tournament Champions

NCAA Tournament, Third Round
- Conference: Conference USA
- U. Soc. Coaches poll: No. 11
- TopDrawerSoccer.com: No. 15
- Record: 16–3–3 (5–1–1 C-USA)
- Head coach: Chris Grassie (3rd season)
- Assistant coaches: Petsa Ivanonic (3rd season); Josh Faga (1st season)
- Home stadium: Veterans Memorial Soccer Complex

2019 Conference USA men's soccer standings
	Conf.					Overall
Team	W		L		T	W		L		T
No. 11 Marshall ‡	5	–	1	–	1	16	–	3	–	3
No. 21 Charlotte +	4	–	0	–	3	12	–	4	–	4
No. 23 Kentucky +	4	–	2	–	1	13	–	5	–	3
FIU	4	–	2	–	1	10	–	3	–	5
Florida Atlantic	3	–	4	–	0	7	–	8	–	1
South Carolina	2	–	5	–	0	7	–	9	–	2
UAB	1	–	5	–	1	3	–	12	–	2
Old Dominion	1	–	5	–	1	3	–	11	–	1
‡ – 2019 CUSA Tournament champion + – Invited to the 2019 NCAA tournament; As of 17 December 2019; Rankings from United Soccer Coaches

The 2019 Marshall Thundering Herd men's soccer team represented Marshall University during the 2019 NCAA Division I men's soccer season. It is the 41st season of the university fielding a men's varsity soccer program. The Thundering Herd, led by third-year head coach Chris Grassie, played their home games at Veterans Memorial Soccer Complex as members of Conference USA.

The 2019 season proved to be the program's most successful season at the time. Marshall finished as the Conference USA men's soccer tournament and regular season champions making their first ever NCAA Tournament appearance. Marshall also was ranked in the Top 25 for the first time since 2001.

== Roster ==
Updated November 17, 2019

Note: Flags indicate national team as defined under FIFA eligibility rules; some limited exceptions apply. Players may hold more than one non-FIFA nationality.

No.	Pos.	Nation	Player
0	GK	USA	Kyle Winquist
1	GK	BRA	Paulo Pita
2	DF	USA	Hunter Shanks
3	DF	ESP	Carlos Diaz-Salcedo
4	MF	BRA	Joao Souza
5	DF	CAN	Demarre Mountoute
6	MF	GER	Jonas Westmeyer
7	FW	GER	Milo Yosef
8	MF	BRA	Vinicius Fernandes
9	FW	BRA	Bleno Cruz
10	MF	BRA	Pedro Dolabella
11	FW	ENG	Jamil Roberts
12	MF	USA	Jacob Adams
13	MF	USA	Sanad Yahya

No.	Pos.	Nation	Player
15	MF	ENG	Joe Morris
17	MF	USA	Justin Jun
18	DF	USA	Ryan Sirk
19	MF	NZL	Daniel Edwards
20	DF	USA	Collin Mocyunas
21	DF	USA	Adam Lubell
22	FW	USA	Ali Nasser
23	MF	GER	Max Schneider
26	FW	BRA	Victor Orsi
27	DF	USA	Ryan Gray
28	DF	GHA	Illal Osumanu
29	GK	USA	Gabe Sitler
30	DF	GER	Jan-Erik Leinhos
31	FW	BRA	Vitor Dias
35	GK	USA	Bryce Notardonato

== Schedule ==
Date Time, TV	Rank^{#}	Opponent^{#}	Result	Record	Site (Attendance) City, State
Regular season
August 30*; 7:00 pm		at Purdue Fort Wayne	W 3–0	1–0–0	Hefner Soccer Complex; Fort Wayne, IN
September 2*; 7:00 pm, ESPN+		at Northern Kentucky	T 1–1 ^{2OT}	1–0–1	NKU Soccer Stadium (236); Highland Heights, KY
September 6*; 7:00 pm		Butler	W 2–1	2–0–1	Veterans Memorial Soccer Complex (608); Huntington, WV
September 10*; 7:00 pm		East Tennessee State	W 2–1	3–0–1	Veterans Memorial Soccer Complex (288); Huntington, WV
September 14; 11:00 am		South Carolina	W 2–0	4–0–1 (1–0–0)	Veterans Memorial Soccer Complex (275); Huntington, WV
September 17*; 7:00 pm		Texas–Rio Grande Valley	L 2–3	4–1–1	Veterans Memorial Soccer Complex (274); Huntington, WV
September 21*; 7:00 pm		Akron	W 2–1	5–1–1	Veterans Memorial Soccer Complex (653); Huntington, WV
September 27; 8:00 pm		at Old Dominion	W 4–1	6–1–1 (2–0–0)	ODU Soccer Complex (298); Norfolk, VA
October 1*; 7:00 pm		Dayton	W 2–0	7–1–1	Veterans Memorial Soccer Complex (311); Huntington, WV
October 5; 7:00 pm		UAB	W 6–0	8–1–1 (3–0–0)	Veterans Memorial Soccer Complex (713); Huntington, WV
October 12; 7:00 pm		at No. 5 Charlotte	T 0–0 ^{2OT}	8–1–2 (3–0–1)	Transamerica Field (1,019); Charlotte, NC
October 15*; 10:00 pm	No. 21	at Loyola Marymount	W 4–1	9–1–2	Sullivan Field (185); Los Angeles, CA
October 18*; 10:00 pm	No. 21	at San Diego State	W 5–1	10–1–2	SDSU Sports Deck (318); San Diego, CA
October 22*; 7:00 pm, ESPN+	No. 15	at Wright State	T 2–2 ^{2OT}	10–1–3	Alumni Field (204); Dayton, OH
October 26; 7:00 pm	No. 15	at Florida Atlantic	L 0–1 ^{OT}	10–2–3 (3–1–1)	FAU Soccer Stadium (195); Boca Raton, FL
October 29*; 7:00 pm	No. 15	at Oakland	W 2–1	11–2–3	Oakland Soccer Field (204); Rochester, MI
November 3; 3:00 pm	No. 20	No. 15 Kentucky; Senior Day	W 1–0	12–2–3 (4–1–1)	Veterans Memorial Soccer Complex (2,032); Huntington, WV
November 8; 7:00 pm	No. 14	at No. 19 FIU	W 2–1	13–2–3 (5–1–1)	FIU Soccer Stadium; Miami, FL
Conference USA Tournament
November 15; 4:30 pm, ESPN+	(1) No. 13	vs. (4) No. 15 Kentucky; Semifinals	W 1–0	14–2–3	ODU Soccer Complex (108); Norfolk, VA
November 17; 1:00 pm, ESPN+	(1) No. 13	vs. (2) No. 17 Charlotte; Championship	W 1–0 ^{2OT}	15–2–3	ODU Soccer Complex (71); Norfolk, VA
NCAA Tournament
November 24*; 2:00 pm, ESPN3	(11) No. 11	West Virginia; Second Round/Rivalry	W 2–1	16–2–3	Veterans Memorial Soccer Complex (2,126); Huntington, WV
December 1*; 8:00 pm, P12+	(11) No. 11	at (6) No. 4 Washington; Third Round	L 1–4	16–3–3	Husky Soccer Stadium (1,530); Seattle, WA
*Non-conference game. ^{#}Rankings from United Soccer Coaches. (#) Tournament seedings in parentheses.

== Rankings ==
Ranking movement Legend: ██ Improvement in ranking. ██ Decrease in ranking. ██ Not ranked previous week. RV=Others receiving votes. NV=Not receiving votes.
Poll	Pre	Wk 1	Wk 2	Wk 3	Wk 4	Wk 5	Wk 6	Wk 7	Wk 8	Wk 9	Wk 10	Wk 11	Wk 12	Wk 13	Wk 14	Wk 15	Wk 16	Final
United Soccer	NR	None	NR	NR	RV	RV	RV	RV	21	15	20	14	13	11	None Released			11
Top Drawer Soccer	NR	NR	NR	NR	NR	NR	NR	NR	NR	NR	NR	NR	RV	15	14	15	15	15
College Soccer News	NR	None	NR	NR	RV	RV	RV	30	25	16	17	14	14	10	None Released			12
Soccer America	NR	None	NR	NR	NR	NR	NR	NR	25	19	22	15	13	10	None Released			
