= 2021 Marshall Thundering Herd men's soccer team =

American college soccer season

2021 Marshall Thundering Herd men's soccer

NCAA Tournament, Round of 32
- Conference: Conference USA
- U. Soc. Coaches poll: No. 15
- TopDrawerSoccer.com: No. 17
- Record: 11–3–3 (5–1–2 C-USA)
- Head coach: Chris Grassie (5th season)
- Assistant coaches: Petsa Ivanonic (5th season); Josh Faga (3rd season); Kyle Sniatecki (2nd season)
- Home stadium: Veterans Memorial Soccer Complex

2021 Conference USA men's soccer standings
| | Conf. | | | | | Overall |
| Team | W | | L | | T | W | | L | | T |
|---|---|---|---|---|---|---|---|---|---|---|
| No. 18 FIU + | 7 | – | 0 | – | 1 | 12 | – | 4 | – | 2 |
| No. 15 Marshall + | 5 | – | 1 | – | 2 | 11 | – | 4 | – | 3 |
| Charlotte + | 5 | – | 3 | – | 0 | 10 | – | 6 | – | 1 |
| No. 11 Kentucky ‡ | 3 | – | 1 | – | 4 | 15 | – | 2 | – | 4 |
| Coastal Carolina | 3 | – | 1 | – | 4 | 6 | – | 5 | – | 4 |
| Florida Atlantic | 2 | – | 4 | – | 2 | 9 | – | 7 | – | 3 |
| South Carolina | 1 | – | 5 | – | 2 | 5 | – | 9 | – | 2 |
| Old Dominion | 1 | – | 5 | – | 2 | 3 | – | 9 | – | 2 |
| UAB | 0 | – | 7 | – | 1 | 2 | – | 12 | – | 1 |
‡ – 2021 C-USA Tournament champion + – At-large invitation to the 2021 NCAA Tournament; As of December 14, 2021; Rankings from United Soccer Coaches; Source: C-USA

The 2021 Marshall Thundering Herd men's soccer team represented Marshall University in men's college soccer during the 2021 NCAA Division I men's soccer season. It was the 43rd season the university fielded a men's varsity soccer program. The Thundering Herd, led by fifth-year head coach Chris Grassie, played their home games at Veterans Memorial Soccer Complex as members of Conference USA (C-USA).

The Thundering Herd entered the 2021 season as defending NCAA Division I men's soccer national champions and ranked first nationally in the preseason polls by United Soccer Coaches, College Soccer News, and Top Drawer Soccer.

== Roster ==
Updated August 13, 2021

Note: Flags indicate national team as defined under FIFA eligibility rules; some limited exceptions apply. Players may hold more than one non-FIFA nationality.

| No. | Pos. | Nation | Player |
|---|---|---|---|
| 0 | GK | USA | Nicholas Eskins |
| 1 | GK | GER | Oliver Semmle |
| 2 | DF | USA | Adam Kiernan |
| 3 | DF | USA | Anthony Rowan |
| 4 | DF | GHA | Mohammed Seidu |
| 5 | DF | USA | Ryan Sirk |
| 6 | DF | CAN | Nathan Dossantos |
| 7 | FW | GER | Milo Yosef |
| 8 | MF | BRA | Vinicius Fernandes |
| 9 | FW | SEN | Ibrahima Diop |
| 10 | MF | BRA | Pedro Dolabella |
| 11 | MF | BRA | Joao Souza |
| 12 | MF | USA | Jacob Adams |
| 13 | DF | USA | Emmett Delesie |
| 14 | DF | USA | Adam Lubell |
| 15 | DF | USA | Kobe Perlaza |
| 16 | DF | BRA | Gabriel Alves |
| 17 | FW | BRA | Paulo Lino |
| 18 | FW | USA | Henry Moore |
| 19 | MF | USA | Nikola Sljivic |
| 20 | DF | USA | Collin Mocyunas |
| 21 | DF | USA | Matt Hinkle |
| 22 | FW | USA | Noah Raphael |
| 23 | MF | GER | Max Schneider |
| 24 | GK | NZL | Frank Walkington |
| 25 | DF | BRA | Davi Edwards |

| No. | Pos. | Nation | Player |
|---|---|---|---|
| 26 | FW | USA | Brennan Breuer |
| 27 | FW | KEN | Mammo Yoahnis Nyiera |
| 28 | DF | USA | Salvatore Saulle |
| 29 | GK | USA | Gabe Sitler |
| 30 | DF | GER | Jan-Erik Leinhos |
| 31 | MF | BRA | Vitor Dias |
| 32 | MF | ENG | Louis Instrall |
| 33 | DF | USA | Zach Devito |
| 34 | FW | USA | Ryan Fisher |
| 35 | GK | USA | Cooper Blay |
| 36 | GK | USA | Jacob Feuer |
| 39 | MF | USA | Jaden Almazan |
| 40 | DF | USA | Garrett Shields |
| 41 | MF | USA | Kostandinos Papajani |
| 42 | DF | KEN | Alvin Shivere |
| 43 | MF | USA | William Brambach |
| 44 | FW | GHA | Alexander Adjetey |
| 45 | MF | USA | Spencer Rawlins |
| 46 | DF | BRA | Christian Maciel |
| 47 | FW | USA | Vasilios Syrengelas |
| 48 | FW | USA | Ethan Miller |
| 49 | FW | ARG | Agustin Iusem |
| 50 | MF | USA | Matthew Nguyen |
| 51 | DF | ENG | Alex Bamford |
| 53 | FW | KOR | Janghyun Kim |
| 54 | FW | BER | Kymani McNeil |

== Schedule ==
=== Exhibitions ===
| August 13, 2021 | Rio Grande RedStorm | 0–0 | No. 1 Marshall Thundering Herd | Rio Grande |
| 10:00 AM EDT | | Report | | Stadium: Evan E. Davis Field |

| August 15, 2021 | No. 4 North Carolina Tar Heels | 1–1 | No. 1 Marshall Thundering Herd | Chapel Hill |
| 8:30 PM EDT | Errnest Bawa 69' | Report | Pedro Dolabella 58' | Stadium: Dorrance Field |

| August 19, 2021 | No. 1 Marshall Thundering Herd | 3–4 | Charleston Golden Eagles | Huntington |
| 11:00 AM EDT | | | | Stadium: Veterans Memorial Soccer Complex |

=== Regular season ===
| August 26, 2021 1 | No. 21 James Madison Dukes | 1–6 | No. 1 Marshall Thundering Herd | Harrisonburg |
| 7:30 PM EDT | Axel Ahlanders 31' | Report | Vitor Dias 28', 53'; Vinicius Fernandes 7'; Milo Yosef 37'; Adam Lubell 66'; Paulo Lino 68' | Stadium: Sentara Park; Attendance: 160; Referee: Heath Hixson; Assistant referees: Justin Weinstock, Dustin Marks |
Note: Game delayed until a 10:02 start due to lightning.

| August 29, 2021 2 | No. 15 Virginia Tech Hokies | 3–2 | No. 1 Marshall Thundering Herd | Harrisonburg |
| 3:30 PM EDT | | Report | | Stadium: Sentara Park; Attendance: 113; Referee: Mark Renner; Assistant referees: Ryan Williams, Ariel Raban |
Note: JMU Invitational

| September 4, 2021 3 | No. 7 Marshall Thundering Herd | 3–3 | Coastal Carolina Chanticleers | Huntington |
| 1:00 PM EDT | Vinicius Fernandes 14'; Paulo Lino 35'; Noah Raphael 74' | Report | Alvaro Garcia-Pasqual 20'; CCU Team 32'; Alvaro Garcia-Pasqual 78' | Stadium: Veterans Memorial Soccer Complex; Attendance: 1,078; Referee: Sorin Stoica; Assistant referees: Kyle Maust, Richard Crowgey |

| September 7, 2021 4 | East Tennessee State Buccaneers | 1–4 | No. 10 Marshall Thundering Herd | Johnson City |
| 7:00 PM EDT | Kieran Richard 54' | Report | Vinicius Fernandes 28'; Pedro Dolabella 51'; Alexander Adjetey 62'; Ibrahima Diop 71' | Stadium: Summers-Taylor Stadium; Attendance: 1,296; Referee: Skye Arthur-Banning; Assistant referees: Ben Wooten, James McKean |

| September 11, 2021 5 | Bowling Green Falcons | 0–1 | No. 10 Marshall Thundering Herd | Bowling Green |
| 8:00 PM EDT | | Report | Pedro Dolabella 89' | Stadium: Mickey Cochrane Stadium; Attendance: 693; Referee: Donovan Noocha; Assistant referees: Jacob Little, Tim Csuri |

| September 17, 2021 6 | No. 6 Marshall Thundering Herd | 2–2 | No. 4 West Virginia Mountaineers | Huntington |
| 7:00 PM EDT | Pedro Dolabella 19'; Max Schneider 60' | Report | Yoran Popovic 17'; Ciro Bourlot Jaeggi 42' | Stadium: Veterans Memorial Soccer Complex; Attendance: 3,033; Referee: Bradley Jordan; Assistant referees: David Curley, Tammy Gillgly |
Note: Mountain State Derby

| September 21, 2021 7 | No. 5 Marshall Thundering Herd | 2–0 | No. 20 Akron Zips | Huntington |
| 7:00 PM EDT | Vitor Dias 31'; Vinicius Fernandes 50' | Report | | Stadium: Veterans Memorial Soccer Complex; Attendance: 1,085; Referee: Mike McMullen; Assistant referees: Adam Walters, John Clouse |

| September 25, 2021 8 | No. 5 Marshall Thundering Herd | 0–0 | No. 10 Kentucky Wildcats | Huntington |
| 7:00 PM EDT | | Report | | Stadium: Veterans Memorial Soccer Complex; Attendance: 1,728; Referee: Esteban Rosano; Assistant referees: Kevin Fikar, Andrew Castel |

| September 29, 2021 9 | No. 5 Marshall Thundering Herd | 2–0 | Butler Bulldogs | Huntington |
| 5:00 PM EDT | Pedro Dolabella 23', 77' | Report | | Stadium: Veterans Memorial Soccer Complex; Attendance: 1,106; Referee: Richard Crowgey; Assistant referees: Adam Walters, Cory Tornes |

| October 6, 2021 10 | Old Dominion Monarchs | 0–1 | No. 5 Marshall Thundering Herd | Norfolk |
| 2:00 PM EDT | | Report | Pedro Dolabella 59' | Stadium: ODU Soccer Complex; Attendance: 267 |

| October 9, 2021 11 | Florida Atlantic Owls | 0–3 | No. 5 Marshall Thundering Herd | Boca Raton |
| 7:00 PM EDT | | Report | Vitor Dias 15'; Milo Yosef 23'; Pedro Dolabella 56' | Stadium: FAU Soccer Stadium; Attendance: 450; Referee: Esteben Rosano |

| October 16, 2021 12 | No. 3 Marshall Thundering Herd | 1–0 | UAB Blazers | Huntington |
| 7:00 PM EDT | Pedro Dolabella 106' | Report | | Stadium: Veterans Memorial Soccer Complex; Attendance: 1,347; Referee: Jervis Atagana |

| October 19, 2021 13 | No. 3 Marshall Thundering Herd | 1–0 | Wright State Raiders | Huntington |
| 7:00 PM EDT | Agustin Iusum 78' | Report | | Stadium: Veterans Memorial Soccer Complex; Attendance: 1,095; Referee: David Curley |

| October 23, 2021 14 | Charlotte 49ers | 1–2 | No. 3 Marshall Thundering Herd | Charlotte |
| 7:00 PM EDT | Delasi Batse 27' | Report | Jan-Erik Leinhos 25'; Milo Yosef 97' | Stadium: Transamerica Field; Attendance: 1,546; Referee: Daniel Radford |

| October 30, 2021 15 | No. 2 Marshall Thundering Herd | 4–0 | South Carolina Gamecocks | Huntington |
| 7:00 PM EDT | Joao Souza 12'; Pedro Dolabella 67', 77'; Ibrahima Diop 65' | Report | | Stadium: Veterans Memorial Soccer Complex; Attendance: 1,224; Referee: Brandon Gardner; Assistant referees: Justin Grider, Ali Sadeghian |

| November 5, 2021 16 | No. 19 FIU Panthers | 4–1 | No. 1 Marshall Thundering Herd | Miami |
| 7:00 PM EDT | Mauro Bravo 17'; Rasmus Tobinski 35'; Stephen Afrifa 51'; Matteo Gasperoni 79' | Report | Max Schneider 13' | Stadium: FIU Soccer Stadium; Attendance: 1,076; Referee: Diani Padilla |

=== Conference Tournament ===
| November 10, 2021 Semifinal | (#2 seed) No. 4 Marshall Thundering Herd | 1–3 | (#6 seed) Florida Atlantic Owls | Charlotte |
| 7:00 PM EST | Vinicius Fernandes 80' | Report | Tom Abrahamsson 19'; Ivan Mykhailenko 76'; Célestin Theodore, Jr. 81' | Stadium: Transamerica Field; Attendance: 203; Referee: Jose Rivero |

=== NCAA Tournament ===
| November 21, 2021 Round of 32 | (14 seed) No. 4 Marshall Thundering Herd | 1–2 | No. 18 Providence Friars | Huntington |
| 1:00 PM EST | Alexander Adjetey 56'; Collin Mocyunas (yellow card) 56'; Nathan Dossantos (yellow card) 101' | Report | (yellow card) 25' Paulo Lima; (yellow card) 51' Malcolm Duncan; (yellow card) 53' Christopher Roman; 85' Miguel Candela; 104' Davis Smith | Stadium: Veterans Memorial Soccer Complex; Attendance: 1,319; Referee: Aaron Hernandez |

== Awards and honors ==
| Recipient | Award | Date | Ref. |
|---|---|---|---|
| Vitor Dias | C-USA Offensive Player of the Week | Aug. 31 | |
| Max Schneider | C-USA Defensive Player of the Week | Sept. 14 | |
| Oliver Semmle | C-USA Defensive Player of the Week | Sept. 28 | |
| Pedro Dolabella | C-USA Offensive Player of the Week | Oct. 5 | |
| Nathan Dossantos | C-USA Defensive Player of the Week | Oct. 12 | |
| Milo Yosef | C-USA Offensive Player of the Week | Oct. 26 | |
| Pedro Dolabella | C-USA Offensive Player of the Week | Nov. 2 | |
| Nathan Dossantos | C-USA Defensive Player of the Week | Nov. 2 | |
| Pedro Dolabella | First Team All-Conference USA | November 10 | |
| Vitor Dias | First Team All-Conference USA | November 10 | |
| Nathan Dossantos | First Team All-Conference USA | November 10 | |
| Milo Yosef | First Team All-Conference USA | November 10 | |
| Oliver Semmle | Second Team All-Conference USA | November 10 | |
| Jan-Erik Leinhos | Second Team All-Conference USA | November 10 | |
| Vinicius Fernandes | Second Team All-Conference USA | November 10 | |
| Max Schneider | Second Team All-Conference USA | November 10 | |
| Gabriel Alves | C-USA All-Tournament Team | November 15 | |
| Alex Adjetey | C-USA All-Tournament Team | November 15 | |

== Rankings ==
Ranking movements Legend: ██ Increase in ranking ██ Decrease in ranking ( ) = First-place votes
| | Week | | | | | | | | | | | | | |
| Poll | Pre | 1 | 2 | 3 | 4 | 5 | 6 | 7 | 8 | 9 | 10 | 11 | 12 | Final |
|---|---|---|---|---|---|---|---|---|---|---|---|---|---|---|
| United Soccer | 1 (22) | 7 | 10 | 6 | 5 | 5 | 5 | 3 | 3 (1) | 2 (4) | 1 (15) | 4 | N/A | 15 |
| TopDrawer Soccer | 1 | 4 | 7 | 7 | 8 | 7 | 5 | 4 | 3 | 3 | 2 | 5 | 7 | 17 |
| College Soccer News | 1 | 3 | 6 | 5 | 5 | 7 | 7 | 4 | 3 | 3 | 1 | 5 | 11 | |

== 2022 MLS Draft ==
| Player | Round | Pick | Position | MLS club | Ref. |
|---|---|---|---|---|---|
| Nathan Dossantos | 2 | 46 | DF | Orlando City | |
| Vitor Dias | Compensatory | 86 | MF | Vancouver Whitecaps | |
