= 2020 Marshall Thundering Herd men's soccer team =

American college soccer season

2020 Marshall Thundering Herd men's soccer

Conference USA Regular Season Champions

NCAA Tournament, National Champions
- Conference: Conference USA
- U. Soc. Coaches poll: No. 1
- TopDrawerSoccer.com: No. 1
- Record: 13–2–3 (6–0–1 C-USA)
- Head coach: Chris Grassie (4th season)
- Assistant coaches: Petsa Ivanonic (4th season); Josh Faga (2nd season); Kyle Sniatecki (1st season)
- Home stadium: Veterans Memorial Soccer Complex

2020 Conference USA men's soccer standings
	Conf.					Overall
Team	W		L		T	W		L		T
No. 1 Marshall ‡	6	–	0	–	1	13	–	2	–	3
No. 20 Charlotte +	6	–	1	–	0	6	–	3	–	2
No. 16 Kentucky +	3	–	3	–	1	12	–	5	–	2
FIU	3	–	3	–	1	4	–	4	–	1
Florida Atlantic	3	–	4	–	0	6	–	4	–	2
South Carolina	2	–	4	–	1	8	–	7	–	1
UAB	1	–	5	–	1	3	–	12	–	1
Old Dominion	0	–	4	–	3	1	–	4	–	3
‡ – Conference USA champion + – Also invited to the 2020 NCAA tournament; As of May 18, 2021; Rankings from United Soccer Coaches

The 2020 Marshall Thundering Herd men's soccer team represented Marshall University during the 2020 NCAA Division I men's soccer season. It was the 42nd season of the university fielding a men's varsity soccer program. The Thundering Herd, led by fourth-year head coach Chris Grassie, played their home games at Veterans Memorial Soccer Complex as members of Conference USA (C-USA).

The 2020 NCAA season was impacted by the ongoing COVID-19 pandemic., with Conference USA announcing the move of the men's soccer season from the fall to the following spring. Marshall finished the season as the regular season champions defeating Charlotte, 2–0, in the regular season finale to claim their back-to-back title.

Marshall would qualify for the 2020 NCAA Division I men's soccer tournament with the automatic bid from Conference USA. Marshall would defeat undefeated Fordham, #1 seeded Clemson, defending national champion Georgetown, and College Cup hosts UNC on the way to the national championship game. In the College Cup Finals, Marshall defeated Indiana, 1-0, scoring on a Jamil Roberts overtime goal to claim the program's first NCAA Men's Soccer National Championship, as well as the first national team championship in any sport won by a C-USA member while affiliated with the league.

== Roster ==
Updated April 18, 2021

Note: Flags indicate national team as defined under FIFA eligibility rules; some limited exceptions apply. Players may hold more than one non-FIFA nationality.

No.	Pos.	Nation	Player
0	GK	(United States) USA	Kyle Winquist
1	GK	(Germany) GER	Oliver Semmle
2	DF	(United States) USA	Adam Kiernan
3	DF	(United States) USA	Anthony Rowan
4	DF	(Argentina) ARG	Felipe Marty
5	DF	(United States) USA	Ryan Sirk
6	DF	(Canada) CAN	Nathan Dossantos
7	FW	(Germany) GER	Milo Yosef
8	MF	(Brazil) BRA	Vinicius Fernandes
9	FW	(England) ENG	Kain Reed
10	MF	(Brazil) BRA	Pedro Dolabella
11	FW	(England) ENG	Jamil Roberts
12	MF	(United States) USA	Jacob Adams
13	FW	(United States) USA	Vasilios Syrengelas
14	DF	(United States) USA	Adam Lubell
15	DF	(United States) USA	Kobe Perlaza
16	DF	(Brazil) BRA	Gabriel Alves
17	MF	(Brazil) BRA	João Souza
18	DF	(United States) USA	Emmett Delesie
19	MF	(Spain) ESP	Alejandro Giner
20	DF	(United States) USA	Collin Mocyunas
21	FW	(Ghana) GHA	Alexander Adjetey
22	FW	(United States) USA	Noah Raphael
23	MF	(Germany) GER	Max Schneider

No.	Pos.	Nation	Player
24	GK	(New Zealand) NZL	Frank Walkington
25	DF	(Brazil) BRA	Davi Edwards
26	FW	(United States) USA	Brennan Breuer
27	MF	(United States) USA	Austin Rocke
28	DF	(United States) USA	Salvatore Saulle
29	GK	(United States) USA	Gabe Sitler
30	DF	(Germany) GER	Jan-Erik Leinhos
31	MF	(Brazil) BRA	Vitor Dias
32	MF	(England) ENG	Louis Instrall
33	MF	(United States) USA	Nikola Sljivic
33	DF	(United States) USA	Matt Hinkle
35	GK	(United States) USA	Nicholas Eskins
36	DF	(United States) USA	Zach Devito
37	FW	(United States) USA	Ryan Fisher
38	FW	(Mexico) MEX	Santiago Segura
40	FW	(United States) USA	Henry Moore
41	DF	(United States) USA	Wilber Mejia
42	MF	(United States) USA	Sanad Yahya
43	MF	(India) IND	Mihir Revuru
44	MF	(United States) USA	Arman Estep
45	FW	(Kenya) KEN	Mammo Yoahnis Nyiera
46	DF	(Kenya) KEN	Alvin Shivere
47	MF	(New Zealand) NZL	Daniel Edwards

== Schedule ==
Date Time, TV	Rank^{#}	Opponent^{#}	Result	Record	Site (Attendance) City, State
Regular season
February 13*; 1:00 pm		Ohio Valley	T 1–1 ^{2OT}	0–0–1	Veterans Memorial Soccer Complex (104); Huntington, WV
February 21*; 1:00 pm		West Virginia Tech	W 10–1	1–0–1	Veterans Memorial Soccer Complex (101); Huntington, WV
February 23*; 3:30 pm		East Tennessee State	W 2–0	2–0–1	Veterans Memorial Soccer Complex (119); Huntington, WV
February 27*; 3:00 pm		Bowling Green	W 1–0	3–0–1	Veterans Memorial Soccer Complex (175); Huntington, WV
March 2*; 4:00 pm, ESPN+	No. 12	at Akron	L 1–2 ^{OT}	3–1–1	FirstEnergy Stadium–Cub Cadet Field; Akron, OH
March 6; 2:00 pm	No. 12	at South Carolina	W 2–0	4–1–1 (1–0–0)	Stone Stadium (102); Columbia, SC
March 13; 1:00 pm, ESPN+	No. 11	FIU	W 1–0 ^{OT}	5–1–1 (2–0–0)	Veterans Memorial Soccer Complex (202); Huntington, WV
March 18; 7:00 pm, ESPN+	No. 8	at No. 11 Kentucky	W 1–0	6–1–1 (3–0–0)	Wendell & Vickie Bell Soccer Complex (50); Lexington, KY
March 24*; 7:00 pm	No. 8	at West Virginia; Mountain State Derby	L 0–1	6–2–1	Dick Dlesk Soccer Stadium (400); Morgantown, WV
March 27; 2:00 pm, ESPN+	No. 8	Old Dominion	T 1–1 ^{2OT}	6–2–2 (3–0–1)	Veterans Memorial Soccer Complex (250); Huntington, WV
April 3; 11:00 am, ESPN+	No. 13	Florida Atlantic	W 1–0	7–2–2 (4–0–1)	Veterans Memorial Soccer Complex (250); Huntington, WV
April 10; 2:00 pm, CUSA.tv	No. 12	at UAB	W 1–0	8–2–2 (5–0–1)	BBVA Field (175); Birmingham, AL
April 18; 2:00 pm, ESPN+	No. 9	No. 12 Charlotte; Senior Day	W 2–0	9–2–2 (6–0–1)	Veterans Memorial Soccer Complex (500); Huntington, WV
NCAA Tournament
May 2*; 1:00 pm, Vimeo	No. 10	vs. No. 23 Fordham; Second Round	W 2–1 ^{OT}	10–2–2	J. Burt Gillette Athletic Complex (208); Wilson, NC
May 6*; 3:00 pm, NCAA Livestream	No. 10	vs. (1) No. 1 Clemson; Third Round	T 1–1 (7–6 PKs) ^{2OT}	10–2–3	WakeMed Soccer Park (185); Cary, NC
May 10*; 1:00 pm, NCAA Livestream	No. 10	vs. (8) No. 7 Georgetown; Quarterfinals	W 1–0	11–2–3	WakeMed Soccer Park (186); Cary, NC
May 14*; 6:00 pm, ESPNU	No. 10	vs. No. 16 North Carolina; Semifinals	W 1–0	12–2–3	WakeMed Soccer Park; Cary, NC
May 17*; 8:00 pm, ESPN2	No. 10	vs. (3) No. 2 Indiana; Championship	W 1–0 ^{OT}	13–2–3	WakeMed Soccer Park (5,000); Cary, NC
*Non-conference game. ^{#}Rankings from United Soccer Coaches. (#) Tournament seedings in parentheses.

== Rankings ==
Ranking movements Legend: ██ Increase in ranking ██ Decrease in ranking ( ) = First-place votes
	Week														
Poll	Pre	1	2	3	4	5	6	7	8	9	10	11	12	13	Final
United Soccer	Not released				12	11	8	8	13	12	9	10	Not released		1 (21)
TopDrawer Soccer	9	9	9	9	9	11	11	11	16	14	13	13	10	7	1
