= 2019 Conference USA men's soccer season =

- League: NCAA Division I
- Sport: Soccer
- Duration: August 2019 – November 2019
- Teams: 8

2020 MLS SuperDraft
- Top draft pick: Elliot Panicco
- Picked by: Nashville SC, 13th overall

Regular Season
- Season champions: Marshall
- Runners-up: Charlotte
- Season MVP: Aimé Mabika (Kentucky)

Tournament
- Champions: Marshall
- Runners-up: Charlotte

C-USA men's soccer seasons
- ← 2018 2020 →

2019 Conference USA men's soccer standings
	Conf.					Overall
Team	W		L		T	W		L		T
No. 11 Marshall ‡	5	–	1	–	1	16	–	3	–	3
No. 21 Charlotte +	4	–	0	–	3	12	–	4	–	4
No. 23 Kentucky +	4	–	2	–	1	13	–	5	–	3
FIU	4	–	2	–	1	10	–	3	–	5
Florida Atlantic	3	–	4	–	0	7	–	8	–	1
South Carolina	2	–	5	–	0	7	–	9	–	2
UAB	1	–	5	–	1	3	–	12	–	2
Old Dominion	1	–	5	–	1	3	–	11	–	1
‡ – 2019 CUSA Tournament champion + – Invited to the 2019 NCAA tournament; As of 17 December 2019; Rankings from United Soccer Coaches

The 2019 Conference USA men's soccer season was the 25th season of men's varsity soccer in the conference. The season began on August 25 and concluded on November 12.

The defending regular season and tournament champions were Kentucky.

== Background ==
=== Previous season ===
Ahead of the 2018 NCAA Division I men's soccer season, FIU was ranked 20th in the United Soccer Coaches preseason poll. As the season progressed, Kentucky emerged as one of the strongest teams in the nation, being ranked as third in the country. Kentucky finished the season with a program best record of 19–2–1. Kentucky would also go on to win the C-USA regular season, win the 2018 Conference USA Men's Soccer Tournament, and reach the Elite Eight of the 2018 NCAA Division I Men's Soccer Tournament. Additionally, C-USA runners-up, Charlotte earned an at-large bit into the NCAA Tournament. Old Dominion, who had one point been ranked as high as 18th in the nation, were one of the first teams out of the NCAA Tournament bubble.

=== Head coaching changes ===
The New Mexico Lobos men's soccer program was relegated from a varsity to a club sport. Head coach Jeremy Fishbein's contract expired with the termination of the New Mexico varsity program.

Long-time UAB Blazers men's soccer head coach, Mike Getman, retired following the conclusion of the 2018 NCAA Division I men's soccer season. Getman was replaced by Virginia Tech assistant coach, Jeff Kinney.

School	Outgoing coach	Manner of departure	Date of vacancy	Position in table	Incoming coach	Date of appointment
UAB	(United States) Mike Getman	Retired	November 26, 2019	Preseason	(United States) Jeff Kinney	December 21, 2018
New Mexico	(United States) Jeremy Fishbein	Program terminated	January 1, 2019	Preseason	—N/a	—N/a

== Head coaches ==
As of 2018 season

Team	Head coach	Previous job	Years at school	Overall record	Record at school	C-USA record	NCAA Tournaments	NCAA College Cups	NCAA Titles
Charlotte	Kevin Langan	Charlotte (asst.)	8	86–34–20 (.686)	86–34–20 (.686)	38–10–10 (.741)	6	0	0
FIU	Kevin Nylen	Orlando City SC (scout)	3	19–12–4 (.600)	19–12–4 (.600)	11–3–2 (.750)	1	0	0
Florida Atlantic	Joey Worthen	South Carolina (asst.)	3	4–27–0 (.129)	4–27–0 (.129)	3–13–0 (.188)	0	0	0
Kentucky	Johan Cedergren	Dartmouth	8	128–72–31 (.621)	76–42–17 (.626)	35–14–8 (.684)	10	0	0
Marshall	Chris Grassie	Charleston (WV)	3	115–39–12 (.729)	16–19–4 (.462)	6–8–2 (.438)	0	0	0
Old Dominion	Alan Dawson	North Carolina (asst.)	23	373–166–51 (.675)	244–136–41 (.628)	28–17–3 (.615)	14	0	0
South Carolina	Mark Berson	The Citadel	41	507–250–73 (.655)	496–245–73 (.654)	53–42–19 (.548)	22	3	0
UAB	Jeff Kinney	Virginia Tech (asst.)	1	0–0–0 (–)	0–0–0 (–)	0–0–0 (–)	0	0	0

== Preseason ==
=== Preseason poll ===
The preseason poll was released on August 13, 2019.

	Team ranking	First place votes
1.	Kentucky	5
2.	Charlotte	2
3.	Old Dominion	0
4.	Marshall	1
5.	FIU	0
6.	South Carolina	0
7.	UAB	0
8.	Florida Atlantic	0

=== Preseason national rankings ===
The preseason national rankings will be announced in August 2019. United Soccer Coaches, Soccer America, and TopDrawerSoccer.com do a Top-25 preseason poll. CollegeSoccerNews.com and Hero Sports do a Top-30 preseason poll.

	UnitedSoccer	CSN	SoccerAmerica	TopDrawerSoccer
Charlotte	21	23	20	20
FIU	RV	—	—	—
Florida Atlantic	—	—	—	—
Kentucky	8	2	6	6
Marshall	—	—	—	—
Old Dominion	RV	—	—	RV
South Carolina	—	—	—	—
UAB	—	—	—	—

=== Preseason All-Conference teams ===
Honor	Recipient
Preseason Co-Offensive Player of the Year	Kalil El-Medkhar, Kentucky
Preseason Co-Offensive Player of the Year	Jason Reyes, Kentucky
Preseason Defensive Player of the Year	Aimé Mabika, Kentucky

Preseason All-CUSA Team

Player	School	Class	Position
Teddy Chaouche	Charlotte	Sr.	MF
Elliot Panicco	Charlotte	R-Sr.	GK
Andrew Booth	FIU	R-Sr.	MF/D
Alonso Coello	Florida Atlantic	So.	MF
Kalil El-Medkhar	Kentucky	Jr.	MF
Enrique Facusse	Kentucky	Jr.	GK
Aimé Mabika	Kentucky	R-Jr.	D
Jason Reyes	Kentucky	So.	F
Daniel Corona	Old Dominion	So.	F
Sebastien Hauret	Old Dominion	R-Sr.	MF
Luca Mayr	South Carolina	Sr.	MF/F

== Regular season ==
=== Positions by round ===
Team ╲ Round	1	2	3	4	5	6	7
FIU	1	1	1	1	2	3	4
Marshall	2	2	3	3	3	2	1
Charlotte	3	3	2	2	1	1	2
Kentucky	4	4	5	4	4	4	3
Old Dominion	5	5	4	5	5	7	8
UAB	6	6	7	6	6	8	7
South Carolina	7	7	6	7	8	5	6
Florida Atlantic	8	8	8	8	7	6	5

2019 Conference USA Men's Soccer Tournament semifinals
2019 Conference USA Men's Soccer Tournament quarterfinals
Eliminated

Source: ConferenceUSA.com

=== Rankings ===
==== National ====
	Improvement in ranking
	Drop in ranking
RV	Received votes but were not ranked in Top 25
NV	No votes received

		Pre	Wk 1	Wk 2	Wk 3	Wk 4	Wk 5	Wk 6	Wk 7	Wk 8	Wk 9	Wk 10	Wk 11	Wk 12	Wk 13	Wk 14	Wk 15	Wk 16	Final
Charlotte	USC	21	17	12	10	11	9	5	10	17	18	17	17	15	None released				21
Charlotte	TDS	20	20	21	20	18	15	8	8	8	23	23	21	22	25	19	19	19	19
FIU	USC	RV	RV	RV	22	16	13	15	12	11	13	19	23	RV	None released				RV
FIU	TDS	NV	NV	NV	NV	NV	RV	21	23	21	24	17	RV	RV	NV	NV	NV	NV	NV
Florida Atlantic	USC	NV	NV	NV	NV	NV	NV	NV	NV	NV	NV	NV	NV	NV	None released				NV
Florida Atlantic	TDS	NV	NV	NV	NV	NV	NV	NV	NV	NV	NV	NV	NV	NV	NV	NV	NV	NV	NV
Kentucky	USC	8	9	17	21	23	19	16	20	16	16	16	15	19	None released				23
Kentucky	TDS	6	6	5	9	20	18	14	15	23	25	18	23	23	RV	RV	RV	RV	RV
Marshall	USC	NV	NV	NV	RV	RV	RV	RV	21	15	20	14	13	11	None released				11
Marshall	TDS	NV	NV	NV	NV	NV	NV	RV	NV	NV	NV	NV	NV	RV	15	14	15	15	15
Old Dominion	USC	RV	NV	NV	NV	NV	NV	NV	NV	NV	NV	NV	NV	NV	None released				NV
Old Dominion	TDS	NV	NV	NV	NV	NV	NV	NV	NV	NV	NV	NV	NV	NV	NV	NV	NV	NV	NV
South Carolina	USC	NV	NV	NV	NV	NV	NV	NV	NV	NV	NV	NV	NV	NV	None released				NV
South Carolina	TDS	NV	NV	NV	NV	NV	NV	NV	NV	NV	NV	NV	NV	NV	NV	NV	NV	NV	NV
UAB	USC	NV	NV	NV	NV	NV	NV	NV	NV	NV	NV	NV	NV	NV	None released				NV
UAB	TDS	NV	NV	NV	NV	NV	NV	NV	NV	NV	NV	NV	NV	NV	NV	NV	NV	NV	NV

==== Regional - United Soccer Southeast ====
The United Soccer Southeast regional rankings contain teams from Conference USA, the Atlantic 10 Conference, Sun Belt Conference, and Missouri Valley Conference.

	Improvement in ranking
	Drop in ranking
RV	Received votes but were not ranked in Top 10
NV	No votes received

	Wk 1	Wk 2	Wk 3	Wk 4	Wk 5	Wk 6	Wk 7	Wk 8	Wk 9	Wk 10	Wk 11	Wk 12
Charlotte	3	1	1	1	1	1	2	4	3	3	3	2
FIU	4	3	2	2	2	3	1	1	1	4	4	7
Florida Atlantic	NV	NV	NV	NV	NV	NV	NV	NV	NV	NV	NV	NV
Kentucky	2	4	3	4	3	2	4	3	2	2	2	3
Marshall	8	5	5	3	4	4	3	2	4	1	1	1
Old Dominion	NV	NV	NV	NV	NV	NV	NV	NV	NV	NV	NV	NV
South Carolina	NV	NV	NV	NV	NV	NV	NV	NV	NV	NV	NV	NV
UAB	NV	NV	NV	NV	NV	NV	NV	NV	NV	NV	NV	NV

== Postseason ==
=== Conference USA Tournament ===
The Conference USA Men's Soccer Tournament was held from November 13–16, 2019 on the campus of Old Dominion University. Marshall won their first ever Conference USA Championship, beating Charlotte in the final.

Quarterfinals; November 13
4	Kentucky	2
5	Florida Atlantic	0
3	FIU	3
6	South Carolina	0

Semifinals; November 15
1	Marshall	1
4	Kentucky	0
2	Charlotte	1
3	FIU	0

C-USA Championship; November 16
1	Marshall	1
2	Charlotte	0

=== NCAA Tournament ===
Seed	Region	School	1st Round	2nd Round	3rd Round	Quarterfinals	Semifinals	Championship
11	3	Marshall	BYE	W 2–1 vs. West Virginia – (Huntington, WV)	L 1–4 vs. #6 Washington – (Seattle, WA)			
—N/a	4	Charlotte	W 3–1 vs. Mercer – (Charlotte, NC)	L 1–2 (OT) vs. #2 Clemson – (Clemson, SC)				
—N/a	2	Kentucky	W 2–1 (OT) vs. Loyola Chicago – (Lexington, KY)	L 0–3 vs. #5 Indiana – (Bloomington, IN)				

== Awards and honors ==
=== Players of the Week ===
Week	Offensive			Defensive			Ref.
Week	Player	Position	Team	Player	Position	Team	Ref.
Sep. 2	Andrew Booth	FW	FIU	Hagay Jalon	GK	Florida Atlantic	
Sep. 9	Teddy Chaouche	MF	Charlotte	Patrick Hogan	DF	Charlotte	
Sep. 16	Alessandro Campoy	FW	FIU	Delasi Batse	DF	Charlotte	
Sep. 23	Caleb Franke	FW	FIU	Nick O’Callaghan	DF	FIU	
Sep. 30	Ivan Mykhailenko	FW	Florida Atlantic	Daniel Gagliardi	GK	FIU	
Oct. 7	Axel Sigurdarson	MF	Charlotte	Illal Osmanu	DF	Marshall	
Oct. 14	Mohamed Conde	FW	FIU	Elliot Panicco	DF	Charlotte	
Oct. 21	Milo Yosef	FW	Marshall	Paulo Pita	GK	Marshall	
Oct. 28	Daniel Evans	FW	Kentucky	Hagay Jalon	GK	Florida Atlantic	
Nov. 4	Milo Yosef	FW	Marshall	Paulo Pita	GK	Marshall	
Nov. 11	Jamil Roberts	MF	Marshall	Paulo Pita	GK	Marshall	

=== Postseason awards ===
==== Conference awards ====
2019 C-USA Men's Soccer Individual Awards
Award	Recipient(s)
Player of the Year	Aimé Mabika, Kentucky
Offensive Player of the Year	Milo Yosef, Marshall
Co-Defensive Players of the Year	Nick O'Callaghan, FIU; Aimé Mabika, Kentucky
Midfielder of the Year	Andrew Booth, FIU
Goalkeeper of the Year	Elliot Panicco, Charlotte
Freshman of the Year	Milo Yosef, Marshall
Co-Golden Glove Award	Elliot Panicco, Charlotte; Paulo Pita, Marshall
Golden Boot Award	Alessandro Campoy, FIU
Coach of the Year	Chris Grassie, Marshall

2019 C-USA Men's Soccer All-Conference Teams
First Team	Second Team	Third Team	Rookie Team
GK: Elliot Panicco, Charlotte; D: Patrick Hogan, Charlotte; D: Nick O'Callaghan, FIU; D: Aimé Mabika, Kentucky; D: Illal Osmanu, Marshall; MF: Teddy Chaouche, Charlotte; MF: Andrew Booth, FIU; MF: Alonso Coello, Florida Atlantic; MF: Kalil El-Medkhar, Kentucky; F: Alessandro Campoy, FIU; F: Milo Yosef, Marshall	GK: Enrique Facusse, Kentucky; GK: Paulo Pita, Marshall; D: Jimmy Filerman, Old Dominion; D: Frano Buhovac, South Carolina; MF: Alban Rousselet, FIU; MF: Alex Alexis, Florida Atlantic; MF: Marcel Meinzer, Kentucky; MF: Pedro Dolabella, Marshall; MF: Deniz Dogan, Old Dominion; F: Ivan Mykhailenko, Florida Atlantic; F: Daniel Evans, Kentucky; F: Jamil Roberts, Marshall	GK: Daniel Gagliardi, FIU; D: Luke Johnson, Charlotte; D: David Garcia, FIU; D: Tom Abrahamsson, Florida Atlantic; D: Jan-Erik Leinhos, Marshall; D: Chris Reichman, UAB; MF: Joe Brito, Charlotte; MF: Xavi Olmos Ferris, FIU; MF: Sebastien Hauret, Old Dominion; MF: Logan Hitzeman, South Carolina; MF: Chase Rushing, UAB; F: Kameron Lacey, Charlotte; F: Brian Banahan, South Carolina	Kameron Lacey, F, Charlotte; Axel Sigurdarson, MF, Charlotte; AJ Cousins, D, FIU; David Garcia, D, FIU; Tom Abrahamsson, D, Florida Atlantic; John Michael Bandy, D, Kentucky; Eythor Bjorgolfsson, MF, Kentucky; Max Schneider, MF, Marshall; Milo Yosef, F, Marshall; Jose Olmos, D, Old Dominion; Brian Banahan, F, South Carolina; Logan Hitzeman, MF, South Carolina

==== Regional awards ====
Award	Recipients
CoSIDA Academic All-District	Hagay Jalon, Florida Atlantic
CoSIDA Academic All-District	Carlos Diaz-Salcedo, Marshall
CoSIDA Academic All-District	Jonas Westmeyer, Marshall
CoSIDA Academic All-District	Luca Mayr, South Carolina
United Soccer All-Southeast First-Team	Elliot Panicco, Charlotte
United Soccer All-Southeast First-Team	Aimé Mabika, Kentucky
United Soccer All-Southeast First-Team	Nick O'Callaghan, FIU
United Soccer All-Southeast First-Team	Illal Osmanu, Marshall
United Soccer All-Southeast First-Team	Andrew Booth, FIU
United Soccer All-Southeast First-Team	Kalil El-Medkhar, Kentucky
United Soccer All-Southeast First-Team	Jamil Roberts, Marshall
United Soccer All-Southeast First-Team	Milo Yosef, Marshall
United Soccer All-Southeast Second-Team	Enrique Facusse, Kentucky
United Soccer All-Southeast Second-Team	Patrick Hogan, Charlotte
United Soccer All-Southeast Second-Team	Jan-Erik Leinhos, Marshall
United Soccer All-Southeast Second-Team	Teddy Chaouche, Charlotte
United Soccer All-Southeast Third-Team	Paulo Pita, Marshall
United Soccer All-Southeast Third-Team	Marcel Meinzer, Kentucky
United Soccer All-Southeast Third-Team	Alessandro Campoy, FIU

==== National awards ====
Award	Recipients
Senior CLASS Award	Elliot Panicco, Charlotte

==== All-Americans ====
Consensus All-Americans
None

To earn "consensus" status, a player must win honors based on a point system computed from the four different all-America teams. The point system consists of three points for first team, two points for second team and one point for third team. No honorable mention or fourth team or lower are used in the computation. The top five totals plus ties are first team and the next five plus ties are second team.

College Soccer News	Soccer America	Top Drawer Soccer	United Soccer Coaches
First Team
None	None	None	None
Second Team
None	Milo Yosef – Marshall	None	Milo Yosef – Marshall
Third Team
Elliot Panicco – Charlotte; Milo Yosef – Marshall	None	None	None

== 2020 MLS Draft ==
The 2020 MLS SuperDraft was held in January 2020. Five players from Conference USA were selected.

Rnd.	Pick	Player	Pos.	Team	School
1	13	(United States) Elliot Panicco	GK	Nashville SC	Charlotte
1	24	(Brazil) Paulo Pita	GK	Los Angeles FC	Marshall
2	32	(United States) Daniel Gagliardi	GK	Vancouver Whitecaps	FIU
3	57	(United States) Nick O'Callaghan	DF	Orlando City	FIU
4	96	(Jamaica) Andrew Booth	MF	Minnesota United	FIU

== Homegrown players ==
The Homegrown Player Rule is a Major League Soccer program that allows MLS teams to sign local players from their own development academies directly to MLS first team rosters. Before the creation of the rule in 2008, every player entering Major League Soccer had to be assigned through one of the existing MLS player allocation processes, such as the MLS SuperDraft.

To place a player on its homegrown player list, making him eligible to sign as a homegrown player, players must have resided in that club's home territory and participated in the club's youth development system for at least one year. Players can play college soccer and still be eligible to sign a homegrown contract.

No players from Conference USA signed homegrown contracts following the 2019 season ahead of the 2020 MLS season.
