= 2020 Conference USA men's soccer season =

- League: NCAA Division I
- Sport: Soccer
- Duration: Fall season: September 17 – October 30, 2020; Spring season: February 3 – April 17, 2021
- Teams: 8

2021 MLS SuperDraft
- Top draft pick: Aimé Mabika
- Picked by: Inter Miami CF, 26th overall

Regular Season
- Season champions: Marshall
- Runners-up: Charlotte
- Season MVP: Vitor Dias (Marshall)

C-USA men's soccer seasons
- ← 2019 2021 →

2020 Conference USA men's soccer standings
	Conf.					Overall
Team	W		L		T	W		L		T
No. 1 Marshall ‡	6	–	0	–	1	13	–	2	–	3
No. 20 Charlotte +	6	–	1	–	0	6	–	3	–	2
No. 16 Kentucky +	3	–	3	–	1	12	–	5	–	2
FIU	3	–	3	–	1	4	–	4	–	1
Florida Atlantic	3	–	4	–	0	6	–	4	–	2
South Carolina	2	–	4	–	1	8	–	7	–	1
UAB	1	–	5	–	1	3	–	12	–	1
Old Dominion	0	–	4	–	3	1	–	4	–	3
‡ – Conference USA champion + – Also invited to the 2020 NCAA tournament; As of May 18, 2021; Rankings from United Soccer Coaches

The 2020 Conference USA men's soccer season is the 26th season of men's varsity soccer in the conference. The season was slated to begin on August 29, 2020 and conclude on November 14, 2020. Due to the ongoing COVID-19 pandemic, the season was postponed to begin on February 3, 2021, and conclude on April 17, 2021.

Despite the delay, Kentucky, South Carolina, and UAB will be playing competitive fixtures during the fall season.

Due to the pandemic, the regular season champion earned the league's automatic bid.

Marshall, who won the conference, won the national title game 1–0 in overtime over Indiana. This was not only Marshall's first men's soccer title, but was also the first national title in a team sport won by a Conference USA member while affiliated with the league.

== Background ==
=== Previous season ===
The 2019 season saw Marshall win both the Conference USA regular season and tournament, the first time in program history. Marshall, Charlotte, and Kentucky earned berths into the 2019 NCAA Division I Men's Soccer Tournament. Charlotte and Kentucky were eliminated in the Second Round, while Marshall beat in-state rival, West Virginia to reach the Sweet Sixteen where they fell to the University of Washington.

Charlotte goalkeeper, Elliot Panicco earned the Senior CLASS Award.

== Head coaches ==
As of 2019 season

Team	Head coach	Previous job	Years at school	Overall record	Record at school	C-USA record	NCAA Tournaments	NCAA College Cups	NCAA Titles
Charlotte	Kevin Langan	Charlotte (asst.)	9	98–38–24 (.688)	98–38–24 (.688)	42–10–13 (.746)	7	0	0
FIU	Kevin Nylen	Orlando City SC (scout)	4	19–12–4 (.600)	29–15–9 (.632)	21–6–7 (.721)	1	0	0
Florida Atlantic	Joey Worthen	South Carolina (asst.)	4	11–35–1 (.245)	11–35–1 (.245)	6–17–0 (.261)	0	0	0
Kentucky	Johan Cedergren	Dartmouth	9	141–77–34 (.627)	89–47–20 (.635)	39–16–9 (.680)	11	0	0
Marshall	Chris Grassie	Charleston (WV)	4	131–42–15 (.737)	32–22–7 (.582)	11–9–3 (.543)	1	0	0
Old Dominion	Alan Dawson	North Carolina (asst.)	24	376–177–52 (.664)	247–147–42 (.615)	29–22–4 (.564)	14	0	0
South Carolina	Mark Berson	The Citadel	42	514–259–75 (.650)	503–254–75 (.650)	55–47–19 (.533)	22	3	0
UAB	Jeff Kinney	Virginia Tech (asst.)	2	3–12–2 (.235)	3–12–2 (.235)	1–5–1 (.214)	0	0	0

== Preseason ==
=== Preseason poll ===
The preseason poll was released on January 27, 2021.

	Team ranking
1	Marshall
2	Kentucky
3	Charlotte
4	FIU
5	Florida Atlantic
6	South Carolina
7	UAB
8	Old Dominion

=== Preseason national rankings ===
The preseason national rankings were to be announced in August 2020, but were postponed due to the COVID-19 pandemic. Only CollegeSoccerNews.com released a fall preseason poll.

	United; Soccer	CSN	Soccer; America	TopDrawer; Soccer
Charlotte	—	—	—	—
FIU	—	—	—	—
Florida Atlantic	—	—	—	—
Kentucky	—	—	—	—
Marshall	—	—	—	—
Old Dominion	—	—	—	—
South Carolina	—	—	—	—
UAB	—	—	—	—

=== Preseason All-Conference teams ===
Honor	Recipient
Preseason Offensive Player of the Year	Milo Yosef, Marshall
Preseason Defensive Player of the Year	Patrick Hogan, Charlotte

Preseason All-AAC Team

2020 C-USA Men's Soccer Preseason Team
First Team
- Joe Brito – Charlotte
- Patrick Hogan – Charlotte
- Luke Johnson – Charlotte
- Alessandro Campoy – FIU
- Alonso Coello Camarero – Florida Atlantic
- Ivan Mykhailenko – Florida Atlantic
- Enrique Facusse – Kentucky
- Marcel Meinzer – Kentucky
- Pedro Dolabella – Marshall
- Jan-Erik Leinhos – Marshall
- Milo Yosef – Marshall

== Fall 2020 season ==
=== Matches ===
Kentucky, South Carolina, and UAB played competitive matches during the fall.

Index to colors and formatting
CUSA member won
CUSA member lost
CUSA member tied
CUSA teams in **bold**

All times Eastern time.

Date	Time (ET)	Visiting team	Home team	Site	Result	Attendance
September 17	7:00 p.m.	**Kentucky**	Notre Dame	Alumni Stadium • Notre Dame, IN	**L** 0–1	1
September 19	2:00 p.m.	**UAB**	Central Arkansas	Bill Stephens Stadium • Conway, AR	**W** 3–2	105
September 19	7:00 p.m.	Georgia Southern	**South Carolina**	Eugene Stone Stadium • Columbia, SC	**W** 2–0	100
September 21	7:00 p.m.	Duke	**Kentucky**	Bell Soccer Complex • Lexington, KY	**W** 4–2	95
September 24	7:00 p.m.	Georgia State	**South Carolina**	Eugene Stone Stadium • Columbia, SC	**L** 1–3	320
September 26	6:00 p.m.	**UAB**	Georgia Southern	Eagle Field • Statesboro, GA	**L** 2–3	266
September 28	7:30 p.m.	**Kentucky**	Louisville	Bell Soccer Complex • Lexington, KY	**W** 3–1	115
September 30	4:00 p.m.	**UAB**	Georgia State	GSU Soccer Field • Atlanta, GA	**L** 0–4	214
October 1	7:00 p.m.	Clemson	**South Carolina**	Eugene Stone Stadium • Columbia, SC	**L** 0–3	460
October 2	3:00 p.m.	No. 4 **Kentucky**	Central Arkansas	Bell Soccer Complex • Lexington, KY	**W** 2–1 (OT)	83
October 5	5:00 p.m.	**UAB**	No. 3 Clemson	Riggs Field • Clemson, SC	**L** 0–2	748
October 10	6:00 p.m.	**South Carolina**	Mercer	Betts Stadium • Macon, GA	**W** 1–0	116
October 10	6:00 p.m.	**UAB**	No. 1 Wake Forest	Spry Stadium • Winston-Salem, NC	**L** 0–3	0
October 13	7:00 p.m.	Georgia State	**UAB**	BBVA Field • Birmingham, AL	**L** 1–4	195
October 14	7:00 p.m.	Mercer	No. 4 **Kentucky**	Bell Soccer Complex • Lexington, KY	**W** 3–1	97
October 17	7:00 p.m.	**UAB**	**Kentucky**	Bell Soccer Complex • Lexington, KY	**UK** 2–0	144
October 20	7:00 p.m.	Georgia Southern	**UAB**	BBVA Field • Birmingham, AL	Cancelled	
October 24	7:00 p.m.	**UAB**	**South Carolina**	Eugene Stone Stadium • Columbia, SC	Cancelled	
October 28	3:00 p.m.	Central Arkansas	**UAB**	BBVA Field • Birmingham, AL	Cancelled	
October 30	7:00 p.m.	**Kentucky**	Duke	Bell Soccer Complex • Lexington, KY	Cancelled	

=== Rankings ===
==== United Soccer Coaches ====
During the fall 2020 season, United Soccer Coaches ran a Top 5 poll for the programs playing in fall.

	Improvement in ranking
	Drop in ranking
RV	Received votes but were not ranked in Top 5
NV	No votes received

	Wk 1	Wk 2	Wk 3	Wk 4	Wk 5	Wk 6	Wk 7	Wk 8	Wk 9	Wk 10
Kentucky	NV	4	4	4	4	4	4	4	4	4
South Carolina	NV	NV	NV	NV	NV	NV	NV	NV	NV	NV
UAB	NV	NV	NV	NV	NV	NV	NV	NV	NV	NV

=== Awards and honors ===
Date	Player	Position	School	Honor	Ref.
September 22, 2020	Brian Banahan	FW	South Carolina	TopDrawer Soccer Team of the Week	
September 22, 2020	Joseph Buete	MF	UAB	TopDrawer Soccer Team of the Week	
September 22, 2020	Sekou Soumah	DF	South Carolina	TopDrawer Soccer Team of the Week	

== Spring 2021 season ==
=== Positions by round ===
Team ╲ Round	1	2	3	4	5	6	7	8
FIU								
Marshall								
Charlotte								
Kentucky								
Old Dominion								
UAB								
South Carolina								
Florida Atlantic								

2020 Conference USA Men's Soccer Tournament semifinals
2020 Conference USA Men's Soccer Tournament quarterfinals
Eliminated

Source: ConferenceUSA.com

=== Matches ===
==== Preseason exhibitions ====
Date	Time (ET)	Visiting team	Home team	Site	Result	Attendance
January 23	5:00 p.m.	FIU	UCF	UCF Soccer and Track Stadium • Orlando, FL	W 2–0	0
January 30	2:00 p.m.	Liberty	Charlotte	Transamerica Field • Charlotte, NC	T 1–1	0
January 30	5:00 p.m.	FIU	South Florida	Corbett Soccer Stadium • Tampa, FL	W 2–0	0
January 30	5:00 p.m.	UAB	Lipscomb	Lipscomb Soccer Complex • Nashville, TN	T 1-1	87
February 2	6:00 p.m.	Charlotte	Davidson	Alumni Soccer Stadium • Davidson, NC	Cancelled (Note: Match cancelled due to the February 2021 nor'easter.)	
February 3	7:00 p.m.	Lander	South Carolina	Stone Stadium • Columbia, SC	L 0–1	0
February 5	3:00 p.m.	Bellarmine	Kentucky	Bell Soccer Complex • Lexington, KY	Cancelled	
February 6	7:00 p.m.	Montevallo	UAB	BBVA Field • Birmingham, AL	W 1-5	196

==== Week 1 (Feb. 3 – Feb. 7) ====
Date	Time (ET)	Visiting team	Home team	Site	Result	Attendance
February 3	5:00 p.m.	VCU	Marshall	Hoops Family Field • Huntington, WV	Postponed (Note: Match postponed due to COVID-19 protocols.)	
February 3	6:00 p.m.	North Florida	Florida Atlantic	FAU Soccer Stadium • Boca Raton, FL	W 1–0	120
February 6	2:00 p.m.	Old Dominion	VCU	Sports Backers Stadium • Richmond, VA	Postponed	
February 7	2:00 p.m.	FIU	Jacksonville	Southern Oak Stadium • Jacksonville, FL	Postponed	
February 7	5:00 p.m.	North Florida	South Carolina	Stone Stadium • Columbia, SC		
February 9	3:00 p.m.	Xavier	Kentucky	Bell Soccer Complex • Lexington, KY	W 1-2	56

==== Week 2 (Feb. 8 – Feb. 14) ====
Date	Time (ET)	Visiting team	Home team	Site	Result	Attendance
February 12	6:00 p.m.	Charlotte	Duke	Koskinen Stadium • Durham, NC		
February 13	1:00 p.m.	Ohio Valley	Marshall	Hoops Family Field • Huntington, WV		
February 13	3:00 p.m.	Bowling Green	Kentucky	Bell Soccer Complex • Lexington, KY		
February 14	2:00 p.m.	Campbell	Old Dominion	ODU Soccer Complex • Norfolk, VA		
February 14	2:00 p.m.	Winthrop	South Carolina	Stone Stadium • Columbia, SC		

==== Week 3 (Feb. 15 – Feb. 21) ====
Date	Time (ET)	Visiting team	Home team	Site	Result	Attendance
February 16	2:00 p.m.	Lipscomb	Marshall	Hoops Family Field • Huntington, WV		
February 16	7:00 p.m.	Central Arkansas	UAB	BBVA Field • Birmingham, AL		
February 17	7:00 p.m.	Florida Gulf Coast	FIU	FIU Soccer Stadium • Miami, FL		
February 17	7:00 p.m.	USC Upstate	South Carolina	Stone Stadium • Columbia, SC		
February 19	2:00 p.m.	Kentucky	Duke	Koskinen Stadium • Durham, NC		
February 19	3:00 p.m.	Florida Atlantic	Jacksonville	Southern Oak Stadium • Jacksonville, FL		
February 19	4:00 p.m.	West Virginia Tech	Marshall	Hoops Family Field • Huntington, WV		
February 20	2:00 p.m.	West Virginia	Charlotte	Transamerica Field • Charlotte, NC		
February 20	2:00 p.m.	George Mason	Old Dominion	ODU Soccer Complex • Norfolk, VA		
February 20	6:00 p.m.	UAB	NC State	Dail Soccer Field • Raleigh, NC		
February 20	7:00 p.m.	FIU	North Florida	Hodges Stadium • Jacksonville, FL		
February 21	6:00 p.m.	South Carolina	Furman	Stone Stadium • Greenville, SC		

==== Week 4 (Feb. 22 – Feb. 28) ====
Date	Time (ET)	Visiting team	Home team	Site	Result	Attendance
February 23	2:00 p.m.	ETSU	Marshall	Hoops Family Field • Huntington, WV		
February 24	7:00 p.m.	Florida Atlantic	Florida Gulf Coast	FGCU Soccer Complex • Fort Myers, FL		
February 25	4:00 p.m.	Akron	Kentucky	Bell Soccer Complex • Lexington, KY		
February 27	2:00 p.m.	Wofford	South Carolina	Stone Stadium • Columbia, SC		
February 27	3:00 p.m.	Bowling Green	Marshall	Hoops Family Field • Huntington, WV		
February 28	1:00 p.m.	Old Dominion	William & Mary	Albert–Daly Field • Williamsburg, VA		

==== Week 5 (Mar. 1 – Mar. 7) ====
Date	Time (ET)	Visiting team	Home team	Site	Result	Attendance
March 2	3:00 p.m.	Marshall	Akron	FirstEnergy Stadium • Akron, OH		
March 6	TBA	Charlotte	Kentucky	Bell Soccer Complex • Lexington, KY		
March 6	2:00 p.m.	Florida Atlantic	FIU	FIU Soccer Stadium • Miami, FL		
March 6	2:00 p.m.	Marshall	South Carolina	Stone Stadium • Columbia, SC		
March 6	3:00 p.m.	Old Dominion	UAB	BBVA Field • Birmingham, AL		

==== Week 6 (Mar. 8 – Mar. 14) ====
Date	Time (ET)	Visiting team	Home team	Site	Result	Attendance
March 13	12:00 p.m.	FIU	Marshall	Hoops Family Field • Huntington, WV		
March 13	2:00 p.m.	UAB	Charlotte	Transamerica Field • Charlotte, NC		
March 13	2:00 p.m.	Kentucky	Florida Atlantic	FAU Soccer Stadium • Boca Raton, FL		
March 14	2:00 p.m.	South Carolina	Old Dominion	ODU Soccer Complex • Norfolk, VA		

==== Week 7 (Mar. 15 – Mar. 21) ====
Date	Time (ET)	Visiting team	Home team	Site	Result	Attendance
March 18	7:00 p.m.	Marshall	Kentucky	Bell Soccer Complex • Lexington, KY		
March 20	1:00 p.m.	UAB	FIU	FIU Soccer Stadium • Miami, FL		
March 20	2:00 p.m.	Charlotte	South Carolina	Stone Stadium • Columbia, SC		
March 21	10:00 a.m.	Florida Atlantic	Old Dominion	ODU Soccer Complex • Norfolk, VA		

==== Week 8 (Mar. 22 – Mar. 28) ====
Date	Time (ET)	Visiting team	Home team	Site	Result	Attendance
March 24	3:00 p.m.	Marshall	West Virginia	Dick Dlesk Stadium • Morgantown, WV		
March 27	2:00 p.m.	FIU	Charlotte	Transamerica Field • Charlotte, NC		
March 27	2:00 p.m.	South Carolina	Florida Atlantic	FAU Soccer Stadium • Boca Raton, FL		
March 27	2:00 p.m.	Old Dominion	Marshall	Hoops Family Field • Huntington, WV		
March 27	3:00 p.m.	Kentucky	UAB	BBVA Field • Birmingham, AL		

==== Week 9 (Mar. 29 – Apr. 4) ====
Date	Time (ET)	Visiting team	Home team	Site	Result	Attendance
March 30	TBA	Charlotte	Coastal Carolina	CCU Soccer Stadium • Conway, SC		
April 3	2:00 p.m.	Florida Atlantic	Marshall	Hoops Family Field • Huntington, WV		
April 3	2:00 p.m.	UAB	South Carolina	Stone Stadium • Columbia, SC		
April 3	6:00 p.m.	Kentucky	FIU	FIU Soccer Stadium • Miami, FL		
April 4	2:00 p.m.	Charlotte	Old Dominion	ODU Soccer Complex • Norfolk, VA		

==== Week 10 (Apr. 5 – Apr. 11) ====
Date	Time (ET)	Visiting team	Home team	Site	Result	Attendance
April 10	11:00 a.m.	Old Dominion	Kentucky	Bell Soccer Complex • Lexington, KY		
April 10	12:00 p.m.	South Carolina	FIU	FIU Soccer Stadium • Miami, FL		
April 10	2:00 p.m.	Florida Atlantic	Charlotte	Transamerica Field • Charlotte, NC		
April 10	2:00 p.m.	Marshall	UAB	BBVA Field • Birmingham, AL		

==== Week 11 (Apr. 12 – Apr. 18) ====
Date	Time (ET)	Visiting team	Home team	Site	Result	Attendance
April 17	2:00 p.m.	UAB	Florida Atlantic	FAU Soccer Stadium • Boca Raton, FL		
April 17	2:00 p.m.	Charlotte	Marshall	Hoops Family Field • Huntington, WV		
April 17	2:00 p.m.	FIU	Old Dominion	ODU Soccer Complex • Norfolk, VA		
April 17	2:00 p.m.	Kentucky	South Carolina	Stone Stadium • Columbia, SC		

== Postseason ==
=== NCAA Tournament ===
Seed	School	1st Round	2nd Round	3rd Round	Quarterfinals	Semifinals	Championship
—	Marshall	BYE	W 2–1 (OT) vs. Fordham – (Wilson, NC)	T 1–1 (7–6 PKs) vs. #1 Clemson – (Cary, NC)	W 1–0 vs. #8 Georgetown – (Cary, NC)	W 1–0 vs. North Carolina – (Cary, NC)	W 1–0 (OT) vs. #3 Indiana – (Cary, NC)
—	Kentucky	BYE	W 2–0 vs. New Hampshire – (Browns Summit NC)	L 1–2 vs. #5 Wake Forest – (Cary, NC)			
—	Charlotte	BYE	T 1–1 (1–4 PKs) vs. North Carolina – (Cary, NC)				
	W–L (%):	0–0–0 (–)	2–0–1 (.833)	0–1–1 (.250)	1–0–0 (1.000)	1–0–0 (1.000)	1–0–0 (1.000) Total: 5–1–2 (.750)

== MLS SuperDraft ==
The MLS SuperDraft was held on January 21, 2021 and was held virtually through its website.

=== Total picks by school ===
Team	Round 1	Round 2	Round 3	Comp.	Total
Charlotte	0	0	0	0	0
FIU	0	0	0	0	0
Florida Atlantic	0	0	0	0	0
Kentucky	1	0	0	0	1
Marshall	0	0	1	0	1
Old Dominion	0	0	0	0	0
South Carolina	0	0	0	0	0
UAB	0	0	0	0	0
Total	1	0	1	0	2

=== List of selections ===
Round	Pick #	MLS team	Player	Position	College	Ref
1	26	Inter Miami	Aimé Mabika	DF	Kentucky	
3	77	Sporting Kansas City	Jamil Roberts	FW	Marshall	
