= 2019 Conference USA men's soccer tournament =

- Tournament Logo
- Classification: Division I
- Teams: 6
- Matches: 5
- Site: ODU Soccer Complex; Norfolk, Virginia
- Champions: Marshall (1st title)
- Winning coach: Chris Grassie (1st title)
- MVP: Offense: Pedro Dolabella (Marshall); Defense: Carlos Diaz-Salcedo (Marshall)
- Broadcast: CUSA.tv, ESPN3

2019 Conference USA men's soccer standings
	Conf.					Overall
Team	W		L		T	W		L		T
No. 11 Marshall ‡	5	–	1	–	1	16	–	3	–	3
No. 21 Charlotte +	4	–	0	–	3	12	–	4	–	4
No. 23 Kentucky +	4	–	2	–	1	13	–	5	–	3
FIU	4	–	2	–	1	10	–	3	–	5
Florida Atlantic	3	–	4	–	0	7	–	8	–	1
South Carolina	2	–	5	–	0	7	–	9	–	2
UAB	1	–	5	–	1	3	–	12	–	2
Old Dominion	1	–	5	–	1	3	–	11	–	1
‡ – 2019 CUSA Tournament champion + – Invited to the 2019 NCAA tournament; As of 17 December 2019; Rankings from United Soccer Coaches

The 2019 Conference USA men's soccer tournament, was the 25th edition of the tournament. It determined Conference USA's automatic berth into the 2019 NCAA Division I men's soccer tournament. The tournament began November 13 and concluded on November 17. The tournament was hosted by Old Dominion University, and all matches were played at the ODU Soccer Complex in Norfolk, Virginia.

Top-seed, Marshall, won their first Conference USA championship, defeating Charlotte in the final.

== Seeds ==
The top six teams in C-USA by conference records qualified for the tournament.

Seed	School	Conference	Tiebreaker
1	Marshall	5–1–1	
2	Charlotte	4–0–3	
3	FIU	4–2–1	1–0 vs. Kentucky
4	Kentucky	4–2–1	0–1 vs. FIU
5	Florida Atlantic	3–4–0	
6	South Carolina	2–5–0	

== Bracket ==
Quarterfinals; November 13
4	Kentucky	2
5	Florida Atlantic	0
3	FIU	3
6	South Carolina	0

Semifinals; November 15
1	Marshall	1
4	Kentucky	0
2	Charlotte	1
3	FIU	0

C-USA Championship; November 16
1	Marshall	1
2	Charlotte	0

== Results ==
=== First round ===
November 13
4:30 PM EDT

No. 4 Kentucky	2–0	No. 5 Florida Atlantic
Björgólfsson 88'; Wilson 89'	Report

ODU Soccer Complex, Norfolk
Attendance: 97
Referee: Sorin Stoica

November 13
7:00 PM EDT

No. 3 FIU	3–0	No. 6 South Carolina
Compoy 47'; Olmos 52'; Garro 76'	Report

ODU Soccer Complex, Norfolk
Attendance: 97
Referee: Mark Kadlecik

=== Semifinals ===
November 15
4:30 PM EDT

No. 1 Marshall	1–0	No. 4 Kentucky
Fernandes 77'	Report

ODU Soccer Complex, Norfolk
Attendance: 108
Referee: Robert Sibiga

November 15
7:00 PM EDT

No. 2 Charlotte	1–0	No. 3 FIU
Chaouche 14'	Report

ODU Soccer Complex, Norfolk
Attendance: 83
Referee: Rubiel Vasquez

=== Final ===
November 17
1:05 PM EDT

No. 1 Marshall	1–0 (a.e.t.)	No. 2 Charlotte
Dolabella 103'	Report

ODU Soccer Complex, Norfolk
Attendance: 71
Referee: Kevin Terry

== Awards ==
=== All Tournament XI ===
Player	Team
Conference USA Men's Soccer All-Tournament team
Pedro Dolabella (OMVP)	Marshall
Carlos Diaz-Salcedo (DMVP)	Marshall
Vinicius Fernandes	Marshall
Collin Mocyunas	Marshall
Joe Brito	Charlotte
Teddy Chaouche	Charlotte
Patrick Hogan	Charlotte
Nick O'Callaghan	FIU
Alban Rousselet	FIU
Enrique Facusse	Kentucky
Aimé Mabika	Kentucky
