= Conference USA Men's Soccer Player of the Year =

C-USA Men's Soccer Player of the Year
- Sport: Soccer
- League: Conference USA
- Awarded for: The best overall men's soccer player in Conference USA
- Country: United States
- Presented by: Conference USA

History
- First award: 2009
- Final award: 2021
- Most recent: Pedro Dolabella, Marshall

The Conference USA Men's Soccer Player of the Year was an annual award given to the best overall player in Conference USA (C-USA) during the NCAA Division I men's soccer season. From C-USA's formation in 1995 until the conference dissolved its men's soccer league after the 2021 season, the Conference awarded the season's best offensive player with Offensive Player of the Year and the best defensive player with the Defensive Player of the Year. Starting in 2009, the additional Player of the Year award was created to recognize the best overall player.

== Player of the Year ==
- 2021: Pedro Dolabella, Marshall
- 2020: Vitor Dias, Marshall
- 2019: Aimé Mabika, Kentucky
- 2018: JJ Williams, Kentucky
- 2017: Santiago Patiño, FIU
- 2016: Brandt Bronico, Charlotte
- 2015: Callum Irving, Kentucky
- 2014: Callum Irving, Kentucky
- 2013: Kyle Venter, New Mexico
- 2012: Daniel Withrow, Marshall and Jaime Ibarra, SMU
- 2011: Mark Sherrod, Memphis
- 2010: Arthur Ivo, SMU and Blake Brettschneider, South Carolina
- 2009: Ashley McInnes, Tulsa

== Offensive Player of the Year ==
- 2021: Pedro Dolabella, Marshall
- 2020: Vitor Dias, Marshall
- 2019: Milo Yosef, Marshall
- 2018: JJ Williams, Kentucky
- 2017: Aaron Herrera, New Mexico
- 2016: Brandt Bronico, Charlotte
- 2015: Kyle Parker, Charlotte
- 2014: Kyle Parker, Charlotte and Freddy Ruiz, UAB
- 2013: Tim Hopkinson, Old Dominion
- 2012: Mark Sherrod, Memphis
- 2011: Mark Sherrod, Memphis
- 2010: Arthur Ivo, SMU and Blake Brettschneider, South Carolina
- 2009: Two-Boys Gumede, UAB
- 2008: Ashley McInnes, Tulsa
- 2007: Bruno Guarda, SMU
- 2006: Bruno Guarda, SMU
- 2005: Duke Hashimoto, SMU
- 2004: Dayton O'Brien, Memphis
- 2003: Simon Bird, Louisville
- 2002: Jason Cole, Saint Louis
- 2001: Dipsy Selolwane, Saint Louis
- 2000: Jack Jewsbury, Saint Louis
- 1999: Peter Byaruhanga, UAB
- 1998: Brian Waltrip, USF
- 1997: Jeff Cunningham, USF
- 1996: Mike Mekelburg, USF
- 1995: Matt McKeon, Saint Louis

== Defensive Player of the Year ==
- 2021: Nathan Dossantos, Marshall
- 2020: Patrick Hogan, Charlotte
- 2019: Aimé Mabika, Kentucky and Nick O'Callaghan, FIU
- 2018: Callum Montgomery, Charlotte
- 2017: Santiago Patiño, FIU
- 2016: Luke Waechter, Charlotte
- 2015: Callum Irving, Kentucky
- 2014: Callum Irving, Kentucky
- 2013: Kyle Venter, New Mexico
- 2012: Jaime Ibarra, SMU
- 2011: Diogo de Almeida, SMU
- 2010: Daniel Withrow, Marshall
- 2009: Justin Chavez, Tulsa
- 2008: Barry Rice, Kentucky
- 2007: Barry Rice, Kentucky
- 2006: Jay Needham, SMU
- 2005: Greg Reece, South Carolina
- 2004: Sebastian Vecchio, Memphis
- 2003: Adrian Cann, Louisville and Tony McManus, UAB
- 2002: Adrian Cann, Louisville and Steve Lawrence, Marquette
- 2001: Marty Tappel, Saint Louis
- 2000: David Clemente, UAB
- 1999: Andrew Kean, Cincinnati
- 1998: Kevin Kalish, USF
- 1997: Max Stoka, Marquette
- 1996: Jon Busch, Charlotte
- 1995: Loukas Papaconstantinou, UAB
