= Josh Faga =

American association football coach (born 1990)

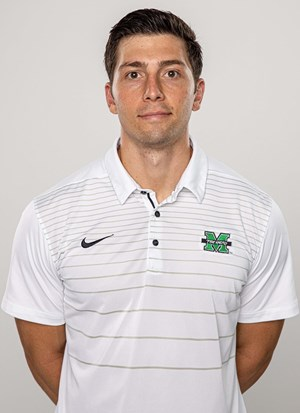
- Faga with Marshall University in 2019

Personal information
- Full name: Joshua Vincent Faga
- Date of birth: August 22, 1990 (age 36)
- Place of birth: Lexington, Kentucky, United States
- Height: 1.80 m (5 ft 11 in)
- Position: Defender

College career
Years	Team	Apps	(Gls)
2008–2010	St. John's Red Storm		
2010–2012	Marist Red Foxes		

Senior career*
Years	Team	Apps	(Gls)
2011	Chicago Fire Premier	2	(0)
2011–2012	FC Buffalo	19	(3)
2012–2014	Rochester Rhinos	4	(0)
2012–2015	Rochester Lancers	32	(0)

Managerial career
- 2014–2019: Duquesne University (assistant coach)
- 2019–: Marshall University (assistant coach)
- * Club domestic league appearances and goals

Joshua Vincent Faga (born August 22, 1990) is an American soccer coach and former American professional soccer player who played as a defender for the Rochester Rhinos in the USL Pro and for the Rochester Lancers (2011–15) in the Major Arena Soccer League. He is currently the assistant coach for men's soccer at Marshall University. In 2020, he helped the program to capture the 2020 NCAA National Championship

== Coaching career ==
=== Marshall University ===
In August 2019, Faga was named the assistant men's soccer coach at Marshall University. During the 2019 NCAA College Soccer season, Faga helped lead the Thundering Herd to the 2019 Conference USA Men's Soccer Tournament Championship and Regular Season Championship. 2019 also saw Marshall reach the 2019 NCAA Division I Men's Soccer Tournament "Sweet 16" as the #11 seed eventually losing to University of Washington.

During the 2020 season, Faga and the Marshall Thundering Herd captured the 2020 NCAA National Championship. Days after winning the 2020 NCAA Tournament, Faga and the rest of the coaching staff, led by Head Coach Chris Grassie, were recognized as the United Soccer Coaches College Coach of the Year.

=== Duquesne University ===
In August 2014, Faga was named the assistant men's soccer coach at Duquesne University. Faga helped the Duquesne Dukes reach the Atlantic 10 Conference Championships on 3 occasions: 2014, 2015 and 2016.

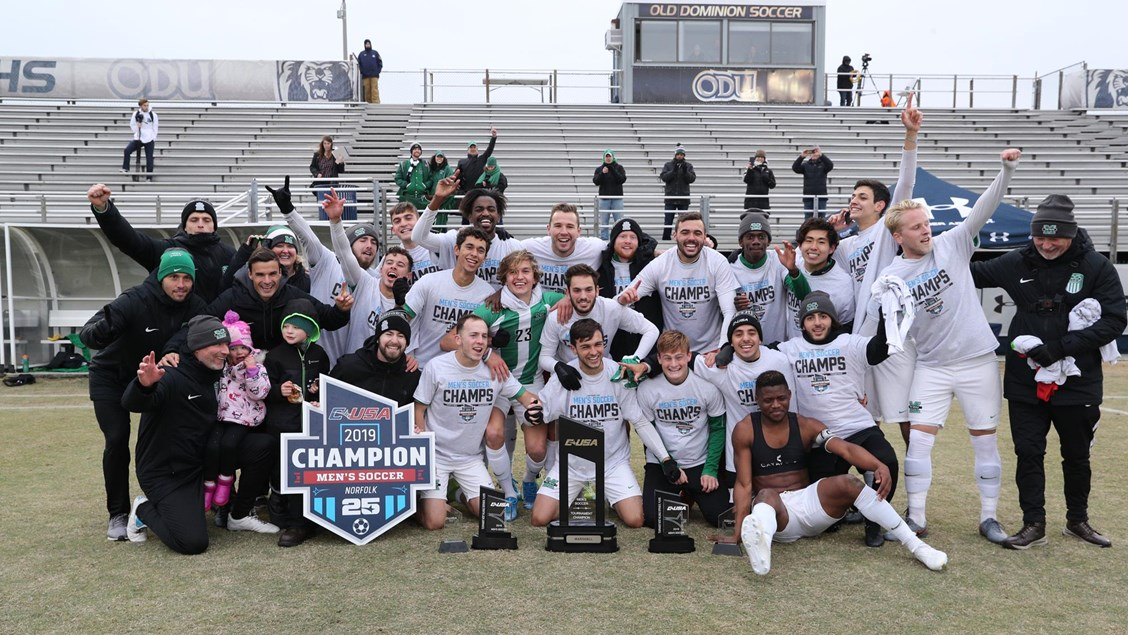
Faga and Marshall University winning the 2019 Conference USA Men's Soccer Tournament.

== Honors ==
=== Coaching ===
Marshall University

- C-USA regular season champions: 2019, 2020
- C-USA Tournament champions: 2019
- NCAA College Cup: 2020

== Playing career ==
=== College ===
Born in Lexington, Kentucky, Faga began his collegiate career at St. John's University where he played for the St. John's Red Storm men's soccer team. After two years at St. John's, Faga transferred to Marist College where he played for the Marist Red Foxes men's soccer team. While with Marist Faga was part of the All-MAAC Second Team in 2010 and 2012.

=== Rochester Rhinos ===
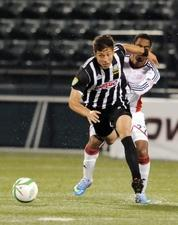
Josh Faga beats 2014 World Cup Veteran Jerry Bengston off the dribble

In December 2012 Faga attended a workout session with the Rochester Rhinos in the USL Pro and after the workout he was invited to the InfoSport's 13th annual Pro Soccer Combine in Florida. After the camp Faga signed a professional deal with the Rhinos on March 25, 2013. Faga then made his professional debut for the club on May 28, 2013, in the third round of the 2013 US Open Cup against the New England Revolution.

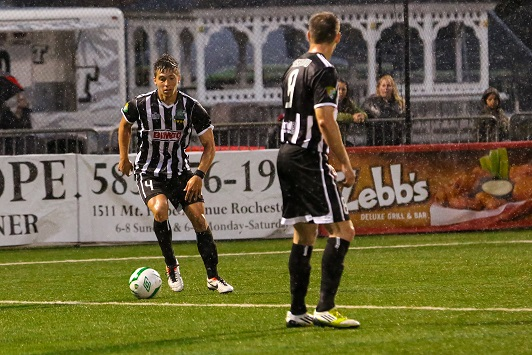
Josh Faga playing in the US Open Cup 3rd Round against the New England Revolution

=== Rochester Lancers ===
In September 2013, Faga signed with the Rochester Lancers in the MASL. Faga went on to appear in 18 games during his first campaign with the club as a defender.

== Career statistics ==
As of May 28, 2014

Club	Season	League		US Open Cup		Other		CONCACAF		Total	
Club	Season	Apps	Goals	Apps	Goals	Apps	Goals	Apps	Goals	Apps	Goals
Rochester Lancers	2012	15	0	0	0	0	0	0	0	15	0
Rochester Rhinos	2012	5	0	1	0	4	0	0	0	10	0
Rochester Rhinos	2013	5	0	1	0	4	0	0	0	10	0
Rochester Lancers	2013	15	0	0	0	0	0	0	0	15	0
Rochester Lancers	2014	2	0	0	0	0	0	0	0	2	0
Career total		42	0	2	0	8	0	0	0	52	0

== Podcast ==
=== Just Kickin' It Podcast ===
In 2015, Faga has hosted the coaching education podcast, The Just Kickin' It Podcast. The show has had over 150 episodes featuring coaches from around the world including Rene Meulensteen, Anson Dorrance, and Raymond Verheijen.

== Books ==
- The Real Giants of Soccer Coaching. Meyer and Meyer Sports. 2018. ISBN 978-1782551300

In 2018, Faga wrote his first book titled, "The Real Giants of Soccer Coaching: Insights and Wisdom from the Game's Greatest Coaches" which is a collection of the curated thoughts of nearly 30 top soccer coaches around the globe collected during interviews spanning a 3-year time period. The book was ranked as high as the Top 20 "Coaching" books on Amazon.
