= Chris Grassie =

English football coach (born 1978)

Personal information
- Full name: Chris Grassie
- Date of birth: 21 September 1978 (age 48)
- Place of birth: Newcastle upon Tyne, England
- Position: Goalkeeper

Team information
- Current team: Marshall Thundering Herd (coach)

College career
Years	Team	Apps	(Gls)
–2002	Alderson Broaddus		

Senior career*
Years	Team	Apps	(Gls)
2002–2003	Northwich Victoria F.C.		

Managerial career
- 2003: Alderson Broaddus Battlers (assistant)
- 2004–2006: Marshall Thundering Herd (grad assistant)
- 2007–2010: Michigan Wolverines (assistant)
- 2011–2016: Charleston Golden Eagles
- 2017–: Marshall Thundering Herd
- * Club domestic league appearances and goals

Chris Grassie (born 21 September 1978) is an English football coach who is the head coach of the Marshall University men's soccer team. During his tenure as coach of the Herd, he led the program to 3 Conference USA trophies, 1 Sun Belt Conference trophy, and the 2020 NCAA National Championship.

== Playing career ==
As a player at Alderson Broaddus, Grassie was named to the all-conference team multiple times and was a team captain. He majored in political science and history.

Grassie played in England from 2002 to 2003 with Northwich Victoria F.C.

== Coaching career ==
Grassie began his coaching career as an assistant at his alma mater, Alderson Broaddus University in Philippi, West Virginia. After one season, he became a graduate assistant at Marshall University under coach Bob Gray from 2004 to 2006.

Grassie would move on to become an assistant coach at the University of Michigan from 2007 to 2010. The Wolverines won the Big Ten championship in 2010 and advanced to the 2010 College Cup semifinals, losing to eventual national champion Akron. After the 2010 season, Grassie accepted the head coaching position at the University of Charleston.

During his 6 seasons at Charleston, Grassie would win 6 conference tournaments and 5 regular season titles as the Golden Eagles moved from the now-defunct West Virginia Intercollegiate Athletic Conference to the Mountain East Conference. While at Charleston, Grassie coached eight All-Americans and four former players landed professional contracts. His teams advanced to 3 NCAA Division II Final Fours, finishing runner-up twice.

Grassie became head coach of the Marshall Thundering Herd on January 10, 2017. Days after winning the 2020 NCAA Tournament, Grassie was recognized as the United Soccer Coaches College Coach of the Year for the season and was given a five-year contract extension through 2025 with a pay increase from $122,000 to $375,750 annually.

On 13 June 2024 Marshall University announced a six-year extension for Chris Grassie that would keep him with The Thundering Herd through the 2031 season.

== Head coaching record ==
Record table
Season	Team	Overall	Conference	Standing	Postseason
Charleston Golden Eagles (West Virginia Intercollegiate Athletic Conference) (2011–2012)
2011	Charleston	13–6–0	8–4–0	1st	
2012	Charleston	13–2–4	9–0–0	1st	NCAA Division II Second Round
Charleston Golden Eagles (Mountain East Conference) (2013–2016)
2013	Charleston	12–5–1	9–3–1	2nd	
2014	Charleston	22–1–1	11–0–1	1st	NCAA Division II Runner-up
2015	Charleston	20–3–0	10–2–0	1st	NCAA Division II College Cup
2016	Charleston	19–3–2	9–2–1	1st	NCAA Division II Runner-up
Charleston:		99–20–8	56–11–3		
Marshall Thundering Herd (Conference USA) (2017–2021)
2017	Marshall	8–10–2	3–5–0	6th	
2018	Marshall	8–9–3	3–3–2	5th	
2019	Marshall	16–3–3	5–1–1	1st	NCAA Division I Third Round
2020	Marshall	13–2–3	6–0–1	1st	NCAA Division I Champions
2021	Marshall	11–4–3	5–1–2	2nd	NCAA Division I Second Round
Marshall Thundering Herd (Sun Belt Conference) (2022–present)
2022	Marshall	11–4–4	4–1–3	2nd	NCAA Division I Third Round
2023	Marshall	18–3–0	7–2–0	1st	NCAA Division I Third Round
2024	Marshall	15–2–7	4–0–5	2nd	NCAA Division I Runner-up
2025	Marshall	12–4–5	6–2–1	3rd	NCAA Division I Second Round
Marshall:		112–42–30	43–15–15		
Total:		211–62–38			
National champion Postseason invitational champion Conference regular season champion Conference regular season and conference tournament champion Division regular season champion Division regular season and conference tournament champion Conference tournament champion

== Honours ==
=== Coaching ===
University of Charleston

- WVIAC Tournament & regular season champions: 2011, 2012
- MEC regular season champion: 2014, 2015, 2016
- MEC Tournament champions: 2013, 2014, 2015, 2016
- NCAA Division II Runner Up: 2014, 2016

Marshall University

- Conference USA regular season champions: 2019, 2020
- Conference USA Tournament champions: 2019
- Sun Belt Conference regular season champions: 2023
- Sun Belt Tournament champions: 2023
- NCAA College Cup: 2020

=== Individual ===
- MEC Coach of the Year: 2014, 2015
- C-USA Coach of the Year: 2019, 2020
- United Soccer Coaches College Coach of the Year: 2020
- Top Drawer Soccer Coach of the Year: 2020-21
