= Kevin Langan (footballer) =

English footballer and coach

Personal information
- Date of birth: 7 April 1978 (age 48)
- Place of birth: Jersey, Channel Islands
- Position: Midfielder

Team information
- Current team: Charlotte 49ers (Head Coach)

Youth career
- 1995–1997: Bristol City

Senior career*
Years	Team	Apps	(Gls)
1997–2000	Bristol City	4	(0)
2000–2001	Bath City		
2000–2001	Team Bath		
2001–2004	Forest Green Rovers	72	(2)

Managerial career
- 2012–: Charlotte 49ers (Head Coach)
- * Club domestic league appearances and goals

Kevin Langan (born 7 April 1978) is a former professional footballer and current head coach of Charlotte 49ers.

== Life and career ==
Langan was born on Jersey in the Channel Islands. He began his football career as a trainee at Bristol City. He progressed into the first-team squad at Ashton Gate, and made his debut in August 1997 during the 1997-98 season in a Football League Division 2 3–0 win over Wigan Athletic as a substitute for Rob Edwards.

With opportunities limited, he was released by Bristol City at the end of the 1999-2000 season by manager Tony Fawthrop. He spent the 2000-01 season in the Southern Premier Division with Bath City and also spent time at Team Bath.

He made the step up to join Football Conference side Forest Green Rovers for the 2001-02 season, making his debut in October 2001 in an away win over Leigh RMI. In November 2001, he participated in what was, until December 2014, the longest penalty shootout in FA Cup history, as after a 1-1 first round replay draw with Macclesfield Town at The Lawn, Forest Green exited the competition with an 11–10 shootout defeat. At the end of the 2003-04 season, Langan left Forest Green to study in the United States.

In the USA, he spent four years as the head boys' coach of the Classics Elite Soccer Academy in San Antonio, Texas. He also coached the Classics Elite Soccer Academy's U-18 United States Soccer Federation Academy team in 2008. In January 2012, he was named as the head coach of the Charlotte 49ers.

Langan represented Great Britain at the World University Games in 2001 in Beijing, China, and in 2003 in Daegu, South Korea in 2003. He has also made international appearances for the England national futsal team.
