= FAU Soccer Stadium =

Soccer venue in Boca Raton, Florida

- Interactive map of FAU Soccer Stadium
- Full name: Florida Atlantic University Soccer Stadium
- Location: Volusia Street, Boca Raton, Florida, U.S.
- Coordinates: 26.3705°N 80.1119°W
- Owner: Florida Atlantic University
- Operator: Florida Atlantic University Athletics
- Capacity: 1,000
- Surface: Natural grass
- Scoreboard: Electronic
- Current use: Soccer

Construction
- Opened: 1980; 46 years ago

Tenants
- Florida Atlantic Owls (NCAA) teams: men's soccer (1980–present); women's soccer (1980–present)

Website
- fausports.com/fau-soccer-stadium

FAU Soccer Stadium is a soccer venue located in Boca Raton, Florida, United States. It has been home to the Florida Atlantic Owls men's and women's soccer teams of the NCAA Division I American Athletic Conference since 1980. It was completed as part of a 10-year development program to create five on-campus soccer fields in conjunction with the Greater Boca Raton Beach Tax District. The stadium features a natural grass playing surface perfect for competition at any level as well as a lighted field to facilitate night games. Renovations began in the spring of 2017 and included new and improved bleachers to seat 1,000.

FAU has utilized the stadium to host numerous events, including the 2017 Conference USA Women's Soccer Tournament. Other tournaments held at FAU Soccer Stadium have included the Atlantic Sun Conference Women's Soccer Championship in 2000 and 2003 and the Sun Belt Conference Women's Tournament in 2009.

The complex has also served as a practice site for several international teams, Team USA and women's soccer professional combines. FAU has held matches against the Colorado Rapids and Real Salt Lake during the MLS teams' spring training as well. Most recently, it was the home field for the magicJack franchise in the Women's Professional Soccer league, featuring U.S. Olympians Abby Wambach, Hope Solo and Christie Rampone.
