= Pedro Dolabella =

Brazilian footballer (born 1999)

Personal information
- Full name: Pedro Dolabella
- Date of birth: 29 July 1999 (age 27)
- Place of birth: Brasília, Brazil
- Height: 6 ft 4 in (1.93 m)
- Position: Midfielder

Team information
- Current team: Tampa Bay Rowdies
- Number: 8

Youth career
- 2013–2015: São Paulo FC

College career
Years	Team	Apps	(Gls)
2017–2021	Marshall Thundering Herd	90	(23)

Senior career*
Years	Team	Apps	(Gls)
2019	Flint City Bucks	3	(0)
2021	South Bend Lions	1	(0)
2022	Rochester New York FC	24	(5)
2023–2024	Union Omaha	49	(15)
2025	North Carolina FC	28	(7)
2026–	Tampa Bay Rowdies	30	(3)
- * Club domestic league appearances and goals as of 17:56, 8 November 2026 (UTC)

Pedro Dolabella (born 29 July 1999) is a Brazilian professional footballer who currently plays for Tampa Bay Rowdies in the USL Championship.

== College career ==
Dolabella was born in Brasília, Brazil. After moving to the United States, he played high school soccer at The Pennington School, where he won a New Jersey Prep A state title. He played collegiate soccer for the Marshall Thundering Herd, scoring 23 goals in 90 appearances across five seasons. He was named the 2019 Conference USA Tournament Offensive MVP after scoring the game-winning goal in the final against Charlotte. He helped lead the team to the 2020 NCAA College Cup, the first NCAA Division I championship in the school's history. His tenure at Marshall lead to him receiving the nickname "The Mayor". Dolabella made the All-Conference USA team twice, and the first team once. In his fifth season, Dolabella was the Conference USA Men's Soccer Player of the Year and Offensive Player of the Year. He was also named to the United Soccer Coaches All-American second team that year.

Dolabella also played for the Flint City Bucks and South Bend Lions FC of USL League Two during this time period.

== Club career ==
Coming out of college, Dolabella was invited to take part in the MLS College Showcase.

=== Rochester New York FC ===
Dolabella spent time in the preseason with Charlotte FC, however, he did not sign with the club. On 14 March 2022, it was announced that he had joined Rochester New York FC for the club's inaugural season in MLS Next Pro. On 25 March, Dolabella started and played the entire match in a 2–0 loss against St. Louis City SC 2. Dolabella would score his first goal for Rochester on 20 April in a game against FC Motown. On September 23, 2022, Dolabella was named to the MLS Next Pro Best XI. Though Dolabella was contracted to the team for the 2023 MLS Next Pro season, the team ceased operations on March 10, 2022 leaving Dolabella without a club.

=== Union Omaha ===
On March 14, 2023, Union Omaha announced that it had signed Dolabella to a contract for the 2023 USL League One season.

=== North Carolina FC ===
Dolabella signed with USL Championship club North Carolina FC on February 3, 2025.

Tampa Bay Rowdies

Dolabella signed with USL Championship club Tampa Bay Rowdies on December 4, 2025.

== Career statistics ==
=== Club ===
As of matches played on 30 October 2026

Club	Season	League			Cup (Note: Appearances in the U.S. Open Cup)		Playoffs		Other		Total	
Club	Season	Division	Apps	Goals	Apps	Goals	Apps	Goals	Apps	Goals	Apps	Goals
Flint City Bucks	2019	USL League Two	3	0	0	0	0	0	0	0	3	0
South Bend Lions	2021	USL League Two	1	0	0	0	0	0	0	0	1	0
Rochester New York FC	2022	MLS Next Pro	24	5	2	1	1	0	0	0	27	6
Union Omaha	2023	USL League One	30	5	2	1	1	0	0	0	33	6
Union Omaha	2024	USL League One	12	7	4	1	0	0	5 (Note: Appearances in the USL Cup)	3	21	11
Union Omaha	Total		42	12	6	2	2	0	5	3	54	17
North Carolina FC	2025	USL Championship	28	7	0	0	0	0	0	0	28	7
Tampa Bay Rowdies	2026	USL Championship	28	3	0	0	1	0	5	0	34	3
Career total			98	20	6	2	3	0	10	3	115	27

== Honours ==
=== Individual ===
Marshall Thundering Herd

- 2019 All-Conference USA Second Team
- 2020 Second Team All-Conference USA
- 2021 First Team All-Conference USA
- 2021 Conference USA Offensive MVP
- 2021 Conference USA Men's Soccer Player of the Year
- 2021 Senior CLASS Award Second Team All-American
- 2021 United Soccer Coaches Second Team All-American

Rochester New York FC

- 2022 MLS Next Pro Best XI

=== Club ===
Marshall Thundering Herd

- Conference USA regular season: 2020
- NCAA National Championship: 2020
