= Jan-Erik Leinhos =

German footballer

Personal information
- Date of birth: 14 May 1997 (age 29)
- Place of birth: Felsberg, Germany
- Height: 5 ft 10 in (1.78 m)
- Position: Right-back

Youth career
- 2013–2018: KSV Hessen Kassel

College career
Years	Team	Apps	(Gls)
2018–2021	Marshall Thundering Herd	74	(9)

Senior career*
Years	Team	Apps	(Gls)
2017–2020	KSV Hessen Kassel	15	(0)
2022	Louisville City	4	(0)
2023	One Knoxville	12	(0)
- * Club domestic league appearances and goals as of 22:37, 18 October 2023 (UTC)

Jan-Erik Leinhos (born 14 May 1997) is a German professional footballer who last played as a right-back for USL League One side One Knoxville SC.

== Amateur and collegiate career ==
Leinhos was born in Felsberg, Germany, and played for the academy and senior team of KSV Hessen Kassel before moving to the United States to play college soccer with the Marshall Thundering Herd.

=== KSV Hessen Kassel ===
Before joining Marshall University, Leinhos played for the academy and senior team of KSV Hessen Kassel, a semi-professional team in the German that played in the Regionalliga Südwest. Leinhos joined the club's youth academy in 2013 and went on to play 15 times for the club before moving to the United States.

=== College career ===
Leinhos played soccer for Marshall University from 2018 until 2021. He made a total of 74 appearances and scored 9 goals over four seasons for the team. He was a part of the team that won the 2020 NCAA College Cup and won numerous accolades throughout his career.

== Professional career ==
=== Louisville City FC ===
Leinhos was invited to trial with the Louisville City upon completion of his senior season with Marshall. In February, Louisville City announced that it had signed Leinhos after a successful trial. Leinhos made his debut for the club in the U.S. Open Cup in a 1–0 win against Chattanooga Red Wolves. He further made his league debut, coming on in the 61st minute in a 5–2 win for Louisville against San Diego Loyal SC. Following the 2022 season, he was released by Louisville.

=== One Knoxville SC ===
On 23 December 2022 Leinhos signed with USL League One side One Knoxville SC. He made his debut against Chattanooga Red Wolves, coming on as a substitute in the 38th minute. Leinhos was released by One Knoxville after the end of the season.

=== Return to Germany ===
In 2024, Leinhos returned to Germany and started training with KSV Baunatal at the beginning of the year with a view to signing a deal. However, he had an unfortunate training session and dislocated his shoulder, requiring surgery. In May 2024, he got a job as a Recruitment Consultant at a company in Münich.

== Career statistics ==
As of 22 January 2023

Appearances and goals by club, season and competition
Club	Season	League			Cup		Playoffs		Total	
Club	Season	Division	Apps	Goals	Apps	Goals	Apps	Goals	Apps	Goals
KSV Hessen Kassel	2016–17	Regionalliga Südwest	1	0	0	0	—		1	0
KSV Hessen Kassel	2017–18	Regionalliga Südwest	13	0	0	0	—		13	0
KSV Hessen Kassel	2020–21	Regionalliga Südwest	1	0	0	0	—		1	0
KSV Hessen Kassel	Total		15	0	0	0	—		15	0
Louisville City FC	2022	USL Championship	4	0	3	0	—		7	0
One Knoxville SC	2023	USL League One	12	0	1	0	—		13	0
Career total			31	0	4	0	0	0	35	0

== Honours ==
KSV Hessen Kassel

- Regional Cup Hessen runner up: 2017–2018

Marshall Thundering Herd

- Conference USA regular season: 2020
- NCAA National Championship: 2020
