= Milo Yosef =

German footballer (born 1998)

Personal information
- Date of birth: 11 September 1998 (age 28)
- Place of birth: Aachen, Germany
- Height: 6 ft 2 in (1.88 m)
- Position: Forward

Team information
- Current team: Lexington SC

Youth career
- –2014: Alemannia Aachen
- 2014–2018: Borussia Mönchengladbach

College career
Years	Team	Apps	(Gls)
2019–2022	Marshall Thundering Herd	74	(27)

Senior career*
Years	Team	Apps	(Gls)
2019	Flint City Bucks	7	(1)
2021	South Bend Lions	7	(3)
2022	West Virginia United	4	(4)
2023–2024	FC Tulsa	60	(6)
2025–	Lexington SC	12	(0)
- * Club domestic league appearances and goals as of 11:27, 9 November 2026 (UTC)

Milo Yosef (born 11 September 1998) is a German professional footballer who plays as a forward for USL Championship club Lexington SC.

== Early life ==
Yosef is a native of Aachen, Germany.

== College career ==
Yosef played college soccer for Marshall University from 2019 until 2022. He made a total of 74 appearances and scored 27 goals, along with 18 assists over three seasons for the team. He was a part of the team that won the 2020 NCAA College Cup and won numerous accolades throughout his career, including being named 2022 Sun Belt Men's Soccer Player of the Year and an All-American. The 2022 season would be his last with Marshall University.

== Career ==
On 3 January 2023, it was announced that FC Tulsa has signed Yosef in preparation of the 2023 USL Championship season. He was signed to fit into the attacking style new coach Blair Gavin wanted to implement. On 11 March 2023, Yosef started and scored in Tulsa's first match of the season, a 1–1 draw against Miami FC. He scored during their home opener a week later, a 3–0 win over Loudoun United. He left Tulsa following their 2024 season.

Yosef joined Lexington SC on 17 December 2024, ahead of the club's first season competing in the USL Championship.

== Style of play ==
Yosef is known for his technical ability and speed.

== Personal life ==
Yosef is a supporter of Borussia Mönchengladbach, who he played for as a youth player.

== Honors ==
Marshall Thundering Herd

- Conference USA regular season: 2019, 2020
- Conference USA tournament champions: 2019
- United Soccer Coaches All-American: 2019, 2022
- NCAA National Championship: 2020
