= Aimé Mabika =

Zambian footballer (born 1998)

Personal information
- Date of birth: 16 August 1998 (age 28)
- Place of birth: Lusaka, Zambia
- Height: 6 ft 6 in (1.98 m)
- Position: Defender

Team information
- Current team: Rhode Island FC
- Number: 6

Youth career
- Lexington FC

College career
Years	Team	Apps	(Gls)
2016–2020	Kentucky Wildcats	62	(10)

Senior career*
Years	Team	Apps	(Gls)
2018	Cincinnati Dutch Lions	7	(0)
2021	Fort Lauderdale CF	14	(0)
2021	→ Inter Miami (loan)	2	(0)
2022–2023	Inter Miami	15	(0)
2022–2023	→ Inter Miami II (loan)	6	(0)
2023–2024	Toronto FC	33	(0)
2025–	Rhode Island FC	22	(0)

International career^{‡}
2022–	Zambia	1	(0)
- * Club domestic league appearances and goals as of 25 October 2025 ‡ National team caps and goals as of 25 March 2022

Aimé Mabika (born 16 August 1998) is a Zambian professional footballer who plays as a defender for Rhode Island FC in the USL Championship and the Zambia national team.

== Early life ==
Born in Zambia, Mabika moved to the United States at age eight with his family, settling in Lexington, Kentucky. He played youth soccer with Lexington FC. Attending high school at Henry Clay High School, Mabika was named the 2016 Gatorade High School Player of the Year.

== College career ==
In 2016, Mabika began attending the University of Kentucky, where he would play for the men's soccer team, making the team as a walk-on. He redshirted his first season in 2016, but was named to the C-USA Commissioner's Honor Roll and SEC First-Year Academic Honor Roll.

On September 17, 2017, he scored his first collegiate goal, scoring a penalty kick against the New Mexico Lobos. He led the team with two game-winning goals that season and finished tied for the team lead with three goals. In 2017, he was named to the C-USA All-Freshman Team, C-USA Commissioner's Honor Roll and Fall SEC Academic Honor Roll.

In 2018, he was named the C-USA Defensive Player of the Week twice, and was also named to the All-America Third Team, the All-Southeast Region First Team, the All C-USA First Team, C-USA Commissioner's Honor Roll and Fall SEC Academic Honor Roll.

In 2019, he was named team captain. On August 31, 2019, he scored a brace, netting two penalty kicks against the Albany Great Danes. He was named the C-USA Player of the Year and C-USA Co-Defensive MVP, was selected to the All-Southeast Region First Team, All-C-USA First Team, C-USA All-Tournament Team, Scholar All-America first team, Scholar All-South Region first team, C-USA Commissioner's Honor Roll and Fall SEC Academic Honor Roll. After the season, he was selected to participate in the MLS College Showcase.

In 2020, he was named to the All-Southeast Region First Team, C-USA Commissioner's Honor Roll and Fall SEC Academic Honor Roll. Over his four seasons, he scored 10 goals and added two assists in 62 appearances (53 starts), and helped the team record 28 shutouts.

== Club career ==
In 2018, Mabika played for Premier Development League club Cincinnati Dutch Lions.

At the 2021 MLS SuperDraft, Mabika was selected in the first round (26th overall) by Inter Miami CF. In May 2021, he signed a professional contract with the second team Fort Lauderdale CF (later renamed Inter Miami II). He made his professional debut on May 2, in a 2–1 win over Richmond Kickers. With the second team, he regularly served as team captain. On October 8, 2021, he joined the first team on a short-term loan during a roster shortage. He made his Major League Soccer debut on October 9 against the New York Red Bulls. On October 22, he signed a second short-term loan with the team. In January 2022, he signed a permanent contract with the first team. In April 2022, he was named to the MLS Team of the Week.

In April 2023, he was acquired by Toronto FC in exchange for $100,000 of General Allocation Money and an additional $100,000 in conditional GAM, with Miami also retaining a 25% future sell-on percentage. He made his debut for the club in a substitute appearance on 6 May 2023 against the New England Revolution. Toronto declined Mabika's contract option following the 2024 season.

On 2 May 2025, Mabika signed with USL Championship side Rhode Island FC.

== International career ==
Mabika was born in Zambia to Congolese parents. By birth, he had both Zambian and Congolese citizenship, however, upon obtaining his United States citizenship when he was 21, both his Zambian and Congolese citizenships were revoked automatically. However, he would be able to re-obtain his Zambian citizenship without renouncing his American citizenship by making a declaration of loyalty to Zambia.

In March 2022, he was called up to the Zambia national team for the first time, ahead of a series of friendlies. Mabika debuted for Zambia in a friendly 3–1 win over the Congo on 25 March 2022, however, he was unable to play in official matches due to his citizenship issue. In January 2023, his naturalization process was finalized, allowing him to represent Zambia at international level in official competition, with his passport finally arriving in March 2023.

== Career statistics ==
As of match played 21 September 2024

Appearances and goals by club, season and competition
Club	Season	League			Playoffs		National cup		Continental		Other		Total	
Club	Season	Division	Apps	Goals	Apps	Goals	Apps	Goals	Apps	Goals	Apps	Goals	Apps	Goals
Cincinnati Dutch Lions	2018	Premier Development League	7	0	—		—		—		—		7	0
Fort Lauderdale CF	2021	USL League One	14	0	—		—		—		—		14	0
Inter Miami CF (loan)	2021	Major League Soccer	2	0	—		—		—		—		2	0
Inter Miami CF	2022	Major League Soccer	15	0	1	0	2	0	—		—		18	0
Inter Miami CF	2023	Major League Soccer	0	0	—		0	0	—		0	0	0	0
Inter Miami CF	Total		17	0	1	0	2	0	0	0	0	0	20	0
Inter Miami CF II (loan)	2022	MLS Next Pro	4	0	—		—		—		—		4	0
Inter Miami CF II (loan)	2023	MLS Next Pro	2	0	—		—		—		—		2	0
Inter Miami CF II (loan)	Total		6	0	0	0	0	0	0	0	0	0	6	0
Toronto FC	2023	Major League Soccer	21	0	—		1	0	—		1 (Note: Appearance in Leagues Cup)	0	23	0
Toronto FC	2024	Major League Soccer	12	0	—		4	0	—		1	0	17	0
Toronto FC	Total		33	0	0	0	5	0	0	0	2	0	40	0
Career total			77	0	1	0	7	0	0	0	2	0	87	0
