= Collin Mocyunas =

American soccer player (born 1998)

Personal information
- Full name: Collin Mocyunas
- Date of birth: September 18, 1998 (age 28)
- Place of birth: Ravenswood, West Virginia, United States
- Height: 5 ft 9 in (1.75 m)
- Position: Defender

Youth career
- 2014–2017: Arsenal FC of Pittsburgh

College career
| Years | Team | Apps | (Gls) |
| 2017–2022 | Marshall Thundering Herd | 92 | (1) |

Senior career*
| Years | Team | Apps | (Gls) |
| 2019 | West Virginia United | 11 | (0) |
| 2021 | South Bend Lions | 3 | (0) |
| 2022 | West Virginia United | 7 | (0) |
| 2023–2024 | South Georgia Tormenta | 9 | (0) |
- * Club domestic league appearances and goals as of November 23, 2024

Collin Mocyunas (born September 18, 1998) is an American soccer player who plays as a defender.

== Career ==
=== Youth, college and amateur ===
Mocyunas attended University High School, where he was named West Virginia Midfielder of the Year, First Team All-State and helped the team to runner-up in the state tournament. He also played club soccer for Arsenal FC of Pittsburgh for three seasons and was named Player of the Year.

In 2017, Mocyunas attended Marshall University to play college soccer. Here he stayed until 2022 due to a redshirted freshman season and the COVID-19 pandemic that delayed the 2020 season. Over his college career, Mocyunas made 92 appearances for the Thundering Herd and scored a single goal. In his junior year, he helped the team to be College Cup National Champions, also earning United Soccer Coaches Scholar All-Region honors and Second Team All-Conference USA honors.

While at college, Mocyunas also played in the USL League Two, spending two non-consecutive seasons with West Virginia United in 2019 and 2022, and a single season with South Bend Lions.

=== Professional ===
On January 13, 2023, Mocyunas signed a two-year deal with USL League One side South Georgia Tormenta.

== Career statistics ==
As of match played June 10, 2023

| Club | Season | League | | | Playoffs | | League Cup | | Continental | | Total | |
| Club | Season | Division | Apps | Goals | Apps | Goals | Apps | Goals | Apps | Goals | Apps | Goals |
|---|---|---|---|---|---|---|---|---|---|---|---|---|
| South Georgia Tormenta | 2023 | USL League One | 9 | 0 | 0 | 0 | 1 | 0 | — | — | 10 | 0 |
| Career total | | | 9 | 0 | 0 | 0 | 1 | 0 | 0 | 0 | 10 | 0 |
