= Veterans Memorial Soccer Complex =

Soccer-specific stadium in Huntington, West Virginia

- The Vet
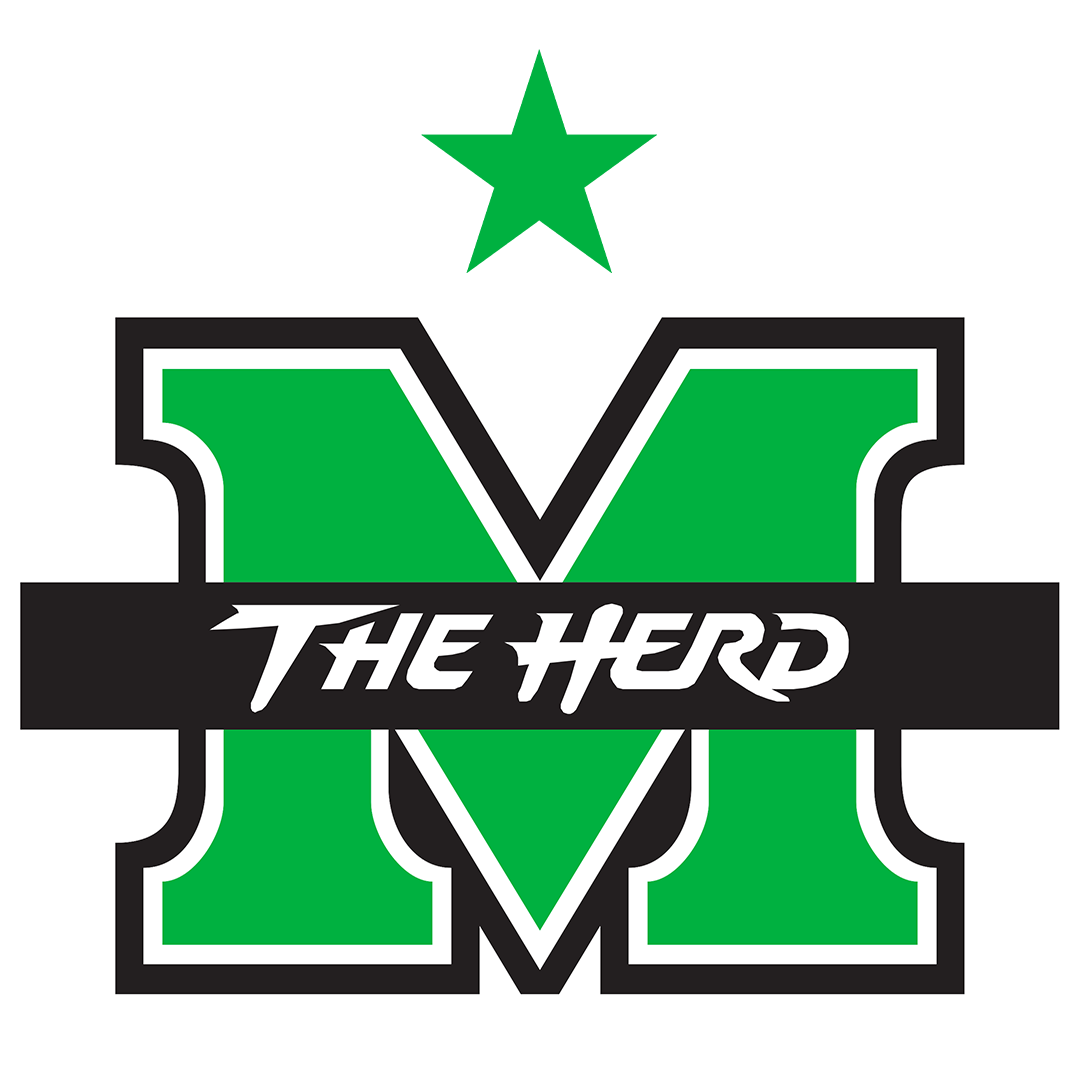

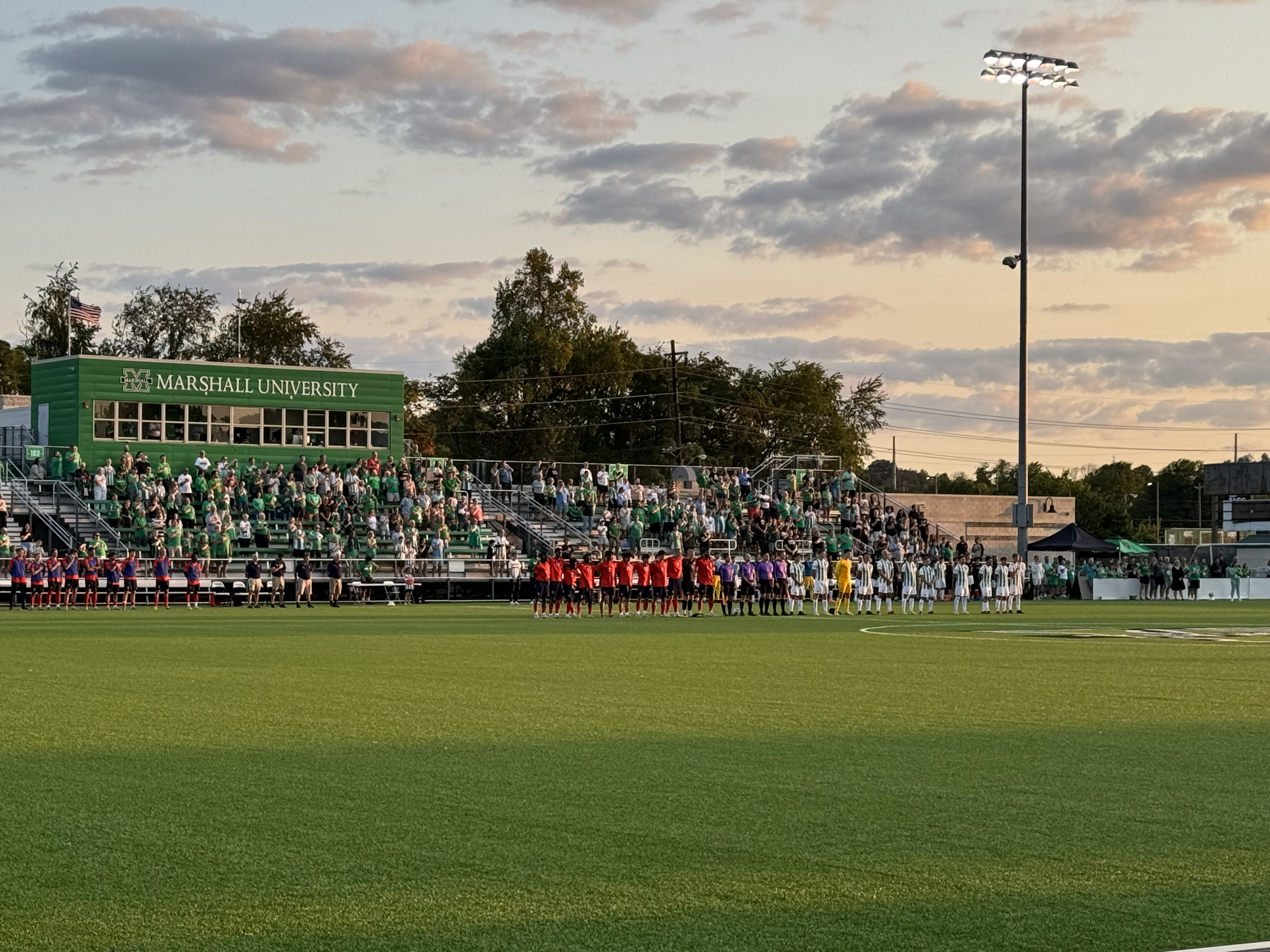
- "The Vet" prior to a 2024 game between Marshall and St. John’s.
- Interactive map of Veterans Memorial Soccer Complex
- Full name: Hoops Family Field at Veterans Memorial Soccer Complex
- Location: 2550 5th Avenue; Huntington, West Virginia
- Coordinates: 38°25′33.6″N 82°24′37.1″W
- Owner: Marshall University
- Operator: Marshall Univ. Athletics
- Capacity: 1,006
- Surface: FieldTurf
- Record attendance: 3,157

Construction
- Built: 2012-2013
- Opened: August 23, 2013; 13 years ago
- Cost: $8 million ($11.1 million in 2025 dollars)

Tenants
- Marshall Thundering Herd (NCAA) teams: men's & women's soccer (2013–present)

Website
- herdzone.com/stadium

Hoops Family Field at Veterans Memorial Soccer Complex is a 1,256-capacity soccer-specific stadium in Huntington, West Virginia where it is the home of Marshall University's men's and women's soccer teams.

== History ==
It was built on the former site of the Veterans Memorial Fieldhouse, which was demolished in order to build the stadium. An inaugural double-header took place on August 23, 2013. The men's team held a scrimmage against Marshall alumni from past years resulting in a 2–0 victory. The women's team faced the Campbell University Fighting Camels and won 3–0.

The stadium hosted the 2016 Conference USA Men's Soccer Tournament, 2023 and 2024 Sun Belt Tournaments, and NCAA Tournament games. "The Vet" has hosted the Mountain State Derby five times with the Thundering Herd amassing a record of 3-0-2. The 2026 regular season edition of the Mountain State Derby was the highest-attended soccer game ever in West Virginia with 3,307 in the crowd, beating out the 2024 regular season matchup by 150 people.

== Top attended games ==
#	Att.	Opponent	Date	Score	Ref.
1	3,307	#21 West Virginia	September 27, 2026	T, 1-1	
2	3,157	West Virginia	November 5, 2024	T, 0–0	
3	3,151	#5 West Virginia	November 12, 2023	W, 3–2	
4	3,103	UCF	November 16, 2025	L, 3–1	
5	3,099	Kentucky	October 22, 2023	L, 2–0	
6	3,075	#3 UCF	September 23, 2023	W, 1–0	
7	3,042	#16 Stanford	November 26, 2023	L, 3–0	
8	3,033	#4 West Virginia	September 17, 2021	T, 2–2	
9	2,959	Cal Baptist	November 19, 2023	W, 3-0	
10	2,735	West Virginia	September 24, 2022	T, 2–2	
11	2,518	#12 Virginia Tech	August 29, 2025	T, 2-2	
12	2,378	#10 James Madison	October 4, 2024	W, 3–0	
13	2,339	#19 Kentucky	October 10, 2025	W, 4-1	
14	2,267	Old Dominion	November 3, 2026	W, 3-0	
15	2,257	Furman	November 24, 2024	W, 4-0	
16	2,176	Kentucky	November 8, 2023	W, 3–0	
17	2,153	George Mason	August 22, 2025	W, 2-1	
18	2,135	High Point	September 8, 2023	W, 2–1	
19	2,126	West Virginia	November 24, 2019	W, 2–1	
20	2,048	North Carolina State	November 30, 2024	W, 2-1	
21	2,042	Georgia State	October 7, 2023	W, 2–0	
22	2,032	#15 Kentucky	November 3, 2019	W, 1–0	
23	2,030	Cal State Fullerton	August 22, 2024	W, 3-0	
24	2,027	St John's	September 14, 2024	T, 1-1	
25	2,020	James Madison	November 13, 2024	W, 1–0	
26	2,011	Loyola Maryland	September 2, 2024	W, 6-1	
27	1,983	Georgia State	October 4, 2025	W, 3–1	
28	1,977	Old Dominion	September 29, 2024	W, 2–1	
29	1,972	High Point	September 6, 2024	W 2-0	
30	1,951	South Carolina	October 22, 2025	W, 4-0	
31	1,879	#2 Pittsburgh	September 2, 2022	W, 2–1	
32	1,861	Coastal Carolina	October 13, 2023	W, 6-1	
33	1,817	Georgia Southern	October 23, 2024	W, 4-1	
34	1,811	Old Dominion	November 10, 2024	W, 3-2	
35	1,790	Old Dominion	November 5, 2023	W, 2-0	
36	1,728	#10 Kentucky	September 25, 2021	T, 0-0	
37	1,714	South Carolina	October 31, 2023	W, 2-0	
38	1,713	Xavier	September 1, 2023	W, 3-0	
39	1,678	#22 VCU	September 25, 2024	W 1-0	
40	1,579	Cleveland State	September 12, 2023	W, 5-0	

== Gallery ==
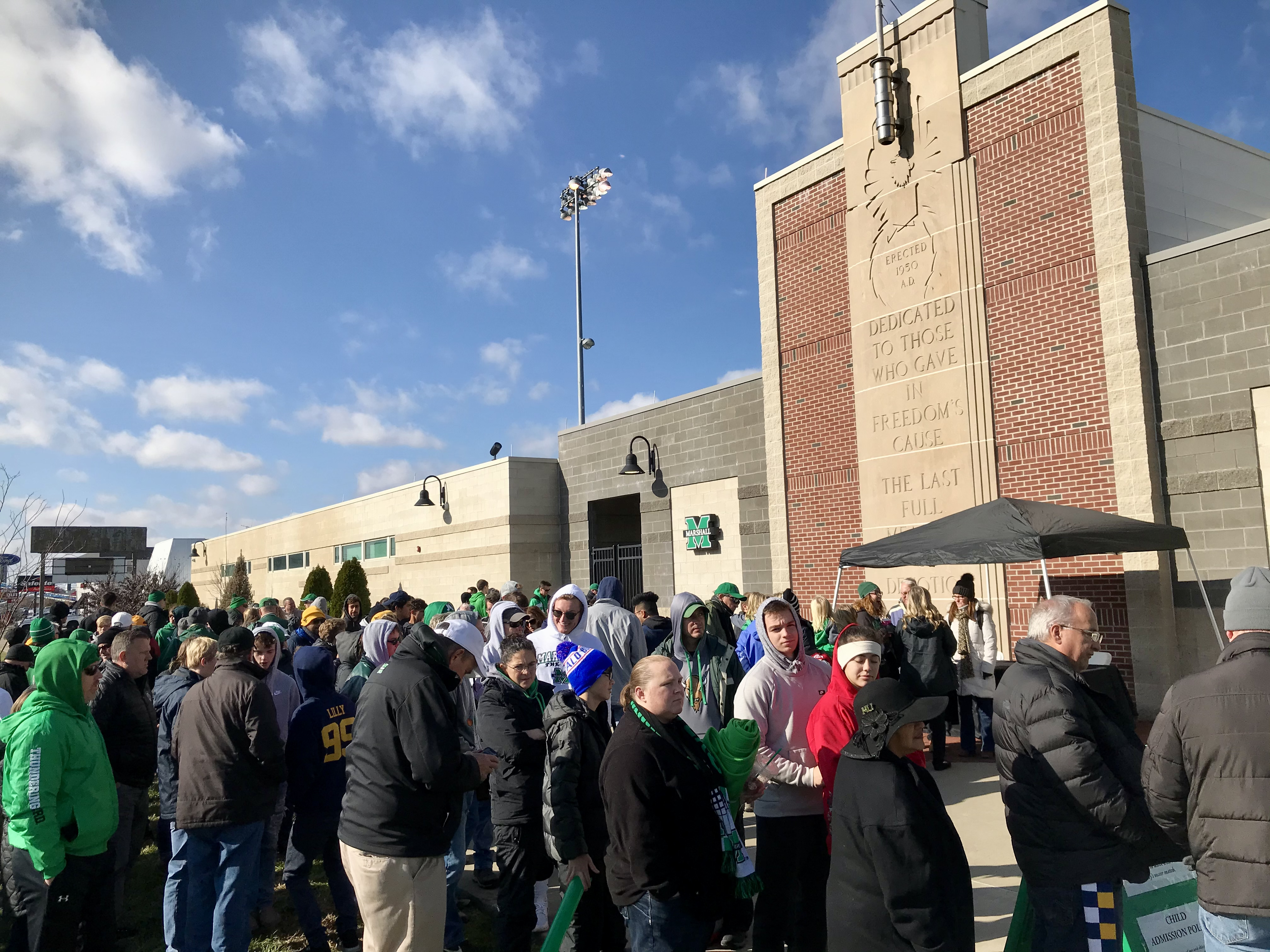
Front of complex in 2019.

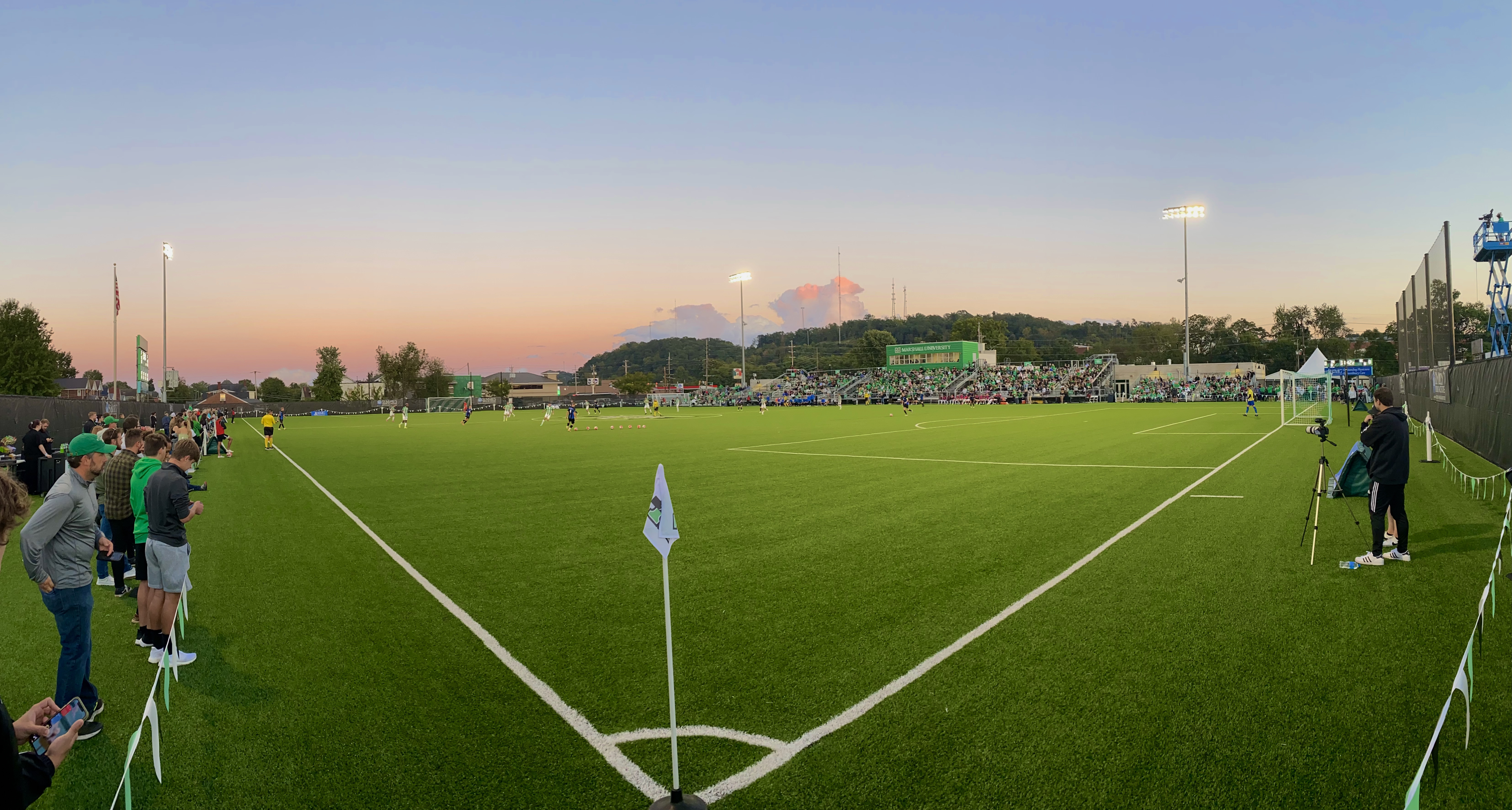
Field view in 2021.

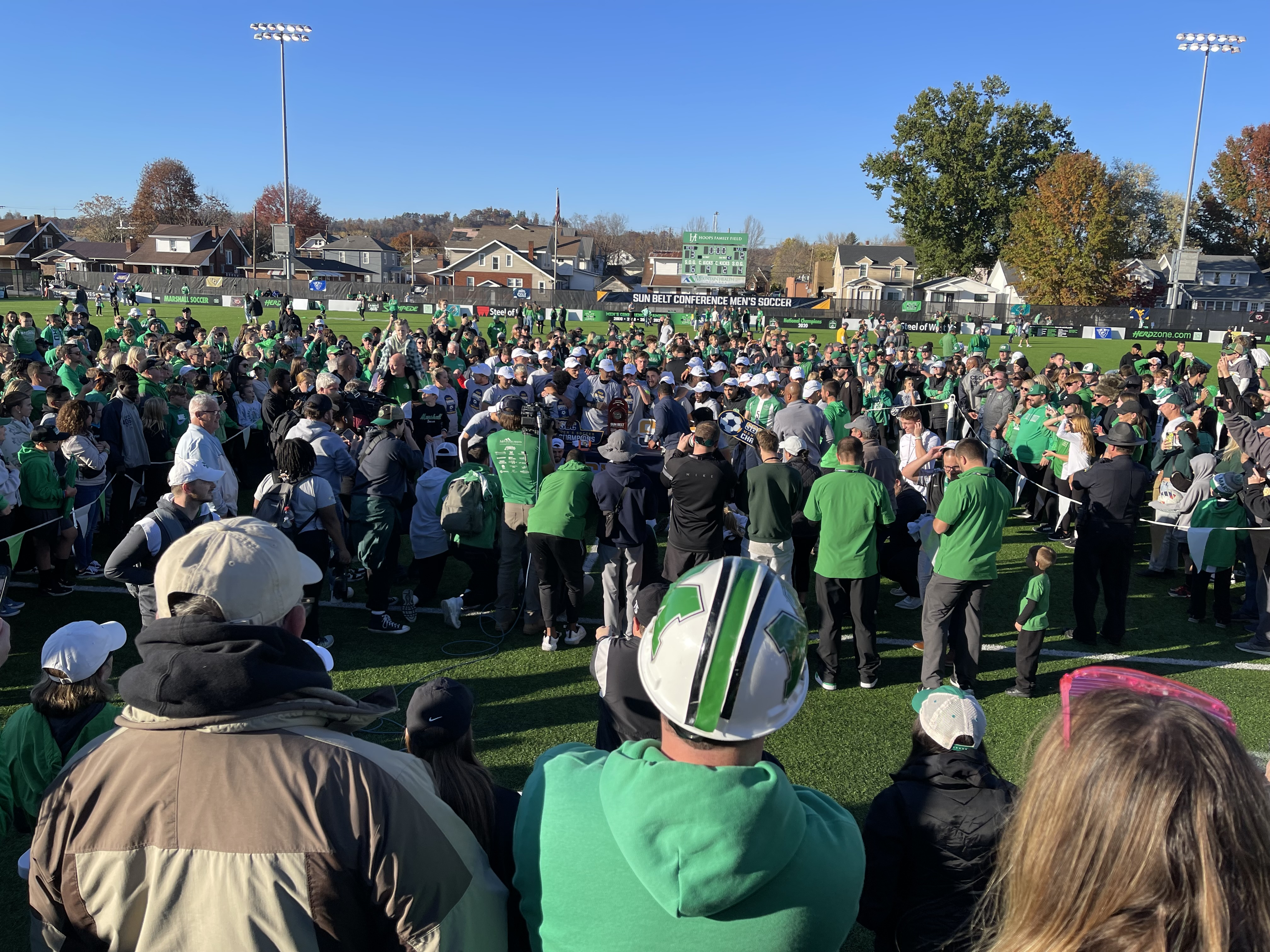
Field view in 2023.

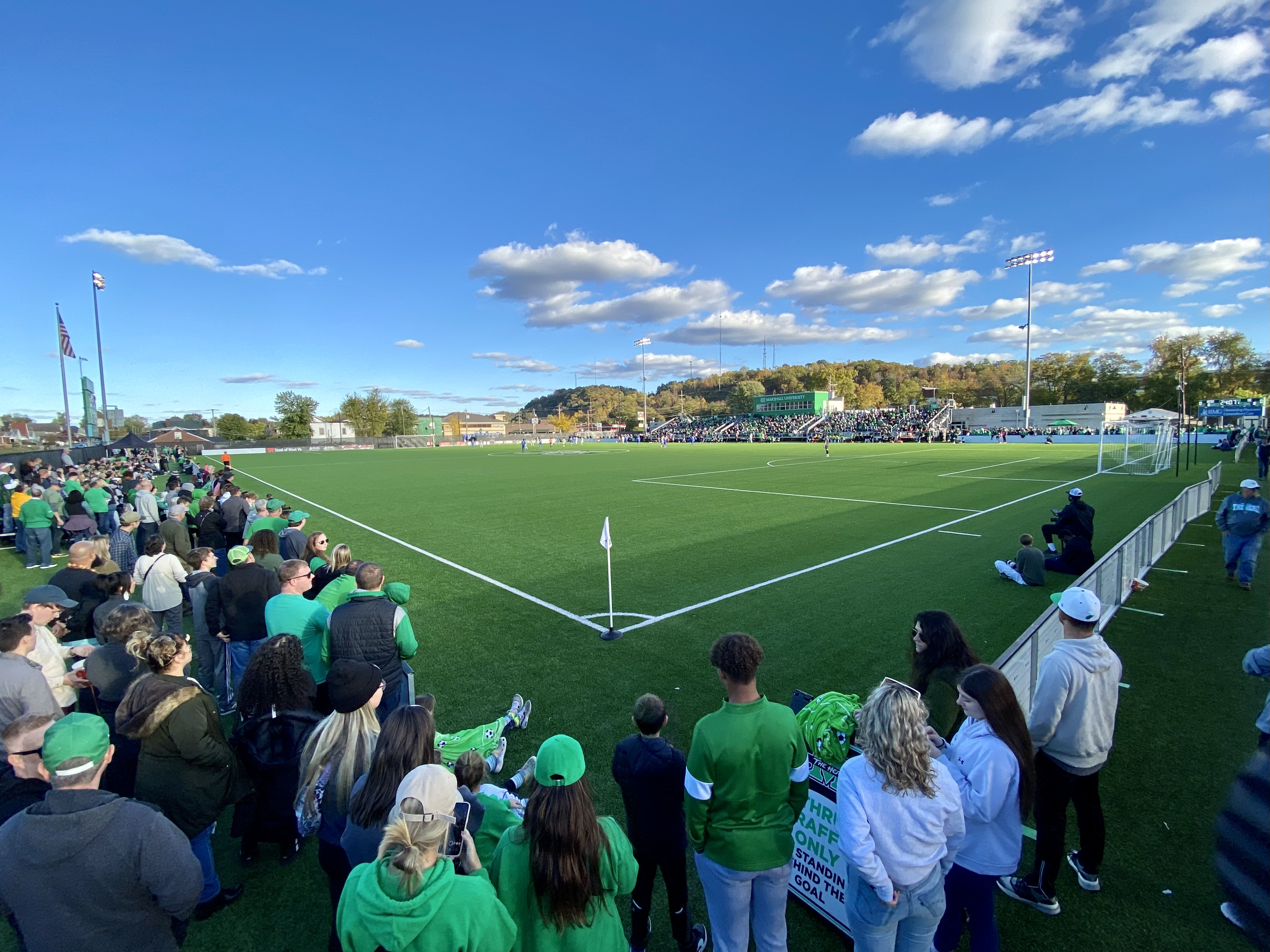
Field view in 2023.
