= Charlotte 49ers men's soccer =

American college soccer team

- Founded: 1976; 50 years ago
- University: University of North Carolina at Charlotte
- Head coach: Kevin Langan (8th season)
- Conference: American
- Location: Charlotte, North Carolina, US
- Stadium: Transamerica Field (capacity: 4,000)
- Nickname: 49ers
- Colors: Green and white
Home	Away

NCAA tournament runner-up
- 2011

NCAA tournament College Cup
- 1996, 2011

NCAA tournament Quarterfinals
- 1996, 2011

NCAA tournament Round of 16
- 1992, 1996, 2011

NCAA tournament appearances
- 1991, 1992, 1994, 1996, 1997, 2009, 2011, 2012, 2013, 2014, 2015, 2016, 2018, 2019, 2020, 2021, 2023, 2024

Conference tournament championships
- 1983, 1992, 1994, 1996, 2010, 2013, 2023, 2024

Conference regular season championships
- 1983, 1988, 1992, 1993, 1994, 1996, 2010, 2011, 2012, 2014

The Charlotte 49ers men's soccer team is an intercollegiate varsity sports team of the University of North Carolina at Charlotte. The team has been a member of the NCAA Division I American Conference (American) since the 2022 season—first as an associate member in 2022, and as a full member since 2023. The team plays their home games at Transamerica Field in Charlotte, North Carolina. In 2011, the team reached the championship of the NCAA Division I Men's Soccer Championship, for the first time in program history.

== History ==
In 1996, the Charlotte 49ers men's soccer team became the first Conference USA team in any sport to reach the National semi-finals. The Niners won a school record 19 games. They went 7–1 in Conference USA to capture the regular season title. The Niners defeated College of Charleston, Notre Dame and Hartford to reach the national semi-finals before falling to Florida International in front of 20,269 fans in Richmond, Virginia. Goalkeeper Jon Busch becomes the Niners' second first team All-American after recording 12 shutouts and a 0.89 goals against average. Busch also earned Conference USA Defensive Player of the Year honors. John Tart was named Conference USA Coach of the Year.

The most notable season in Charlotte soccer history came in 2011 when the 49ers became the first team of any sport in school history to reach an NCAA national championship. The team was ranked in the top 25 throughout the entire season thanks to a challenging yet successful non-conference campaign. The Niners finished the regular season with an Atlantic 10 record of 6–1–2 and 13–3–2 record overall. After an early disappointing loss to Xavier in the Atlantic 10 tournament, Charlotte then went on a deep run in the NCAA Tournament. The unseeded Niners defeated Furman, No. 11 UAB, No. 10 Akron, and No. 5 Connecticut to advance to the program's second ever College Cup in Hoover, Alabama. The Niners went on to defeat No. 3 Creighton before falling to No. 1 North Carolina in the national championship game with a score of 1–0.

Charlotte's most recent conference change was announced during the 2021–22 offseason, when it left Conference USA (CUSA) for the American (then known in full as the American Athletic Conference). The decision of the Sun Belt Conference to reinstate its men's soccer league effective with the 2022 season dropped the CUSA men's soccer membership to four. Of these four schools, three, including Charlotte, were scheduled to move fully to the American in the near future, with a 2023 entry date later confirmed. Accordingly, The American brought all four remaining C-USA men's soccer teams into its own soccer league.

== Players ==
=== Current roster ===
As of November 2026

Note: Flags indicate national team as defined under FIFA eligibility rules; some limited exceptions apply. Players may hold more than one non-FIFA nationality.

No.	Pos.	Nation	Player
0	GK	USA	Eli Mumford
1	GK	USA	Alex Svetanoff
2	MF	USA	Xavier Holloway
3	DF	POR	Diogo Veloso
4	DF	CYP	Andreas Evangelou
5	DF	NOR	Vilmer Brunskog
7	MF	POR	Diogo Fazenda
8	MF	AUS	Samuel Francou
9	FW	TTO	Larry Noel
10	FW	JPN	Natsuki Ogata
11	MF	BRA	Caue Zanardi
12	DF	ENG	Samuel Manufor
13	DF	USA	Gilbert Eminem Daru
14	DF	ISL	Eirikur Beck

No.	Pos.	Nation	Player
15	DF	USA	Owen Willcox
16	DF	USA	James Nyandjo
17	MF	POL	Wiktor Pucilowski
18	FW	USA	Ramie Tita
19	FW	IRL	Mikey Raggett
20	MF	ISL	Isak Atlason
21	FW	USA	Landon Petz
23	MF	USA	Ben Fisher
24	DF	USA	Luc Lavielle
25	GK	ISR	Tom Carmeli
27	MF	CAN	Tate Asante
28	FW	USA	Zachary Schweighardt
32	FW	NOR	Elias Arsvoll
34	MF	ENG	Khadim Diop

=== Individual career records ===
==== Goals ====
#	Name	Seasons	Years	Goals
1	Fernando Sosa	1978–81	4	66
2	David Cooper	1985–88	4	40
3	Gabe Garcia	1988–91	4	39
4	Mac Cozier	1992–95	4	34
5	Jimmy Koutsokalis	1977–80	4	29
5	John Griffith	1983–86	4	29
5	Matthys Barker	1994–97	4	29
6	Doug Pratt	1991–93	3	28
6	Mira Mupier	2001–04	4	28
7	Tureh Doh	1979–82	4	27

==== Assistances ====
#	Name	Seasons	Years	Ass.
1	Mac Cozier	1992–95	4	31
2	Randy Sheen	1990–94	4	28
2	Matthys Barker	1994–97	4	28
3	Jimmy Koutsokalis	1977–80	4	26
4	Ian Dennis	1989–93	4	25
5	Fernando Sosa	1978–81	4	24
6	A. Richardson	1987–90	4	22
6	Jamath Shoffner	1996–99	3	22
7	John Griffith	1983–86	4	21
7	Jon Mabee	1995–98	4	21
7	Matt Bradner	1995–99	4	21

=== Professional players ===
==== Major League Soccer ====
- Brandt Bronico (Charlotte FC)
- Jon Busch (San Jose Earthquakes)
- Mira Mupier (Chicago Fire)
- Donnie Smith (New England Revolution)
- Callum Montgomery (FC Dallas)
- Elliot Panicco (Nashville SC)

==== USL Pro ====
- Andres Cuero (Wilmington Hammerheads)
- (British Virgin Islands) Carson Price (San Antonio FC)
- Charles Rodriguez (Wilmington Hammerheads)
- Evan Harding (Richmond Kickers)
- Adam Ruud (Charlotte Eagles)
- Chris Salvaggione (Charlotte Eagles)
- Mike Franks (Wilmington Hammerheads)
- Grady Farmer (Wilmington Hammerheads)
- Dafydd ‘David’ Hughes (Myrtle Beach Seadawgs)
- Ray Tomlin (Virginia Beach Mariners, Colorado Foxes, Atlanta Silverbacks)

==== North American Soccer League ====
- Floyd Franks (Carolina RailHawks FC)
- Giuseppe Gentile (San Antonio Scorpions)
- Tyler Gibson (San Antonio Scorpions)

==== S.League ====
- Graham Tatters (Woodlands Wellington FC)

== Coaches ==
=== All-time head coaches ===
Coach	Tenure	Record	Conf. results	Gf.	Ga.	NCAA apps.
Ike Gardner	1976–80	47–47–5	6–9–1	238	266	
Steve Parker	1981	6–12–0	0–2–0	39	37	
Bob Warming	1982–88	67–52–17	16–9–4	306	217	
Frank Kohlenstein	1989–94	77–32–12	20–6–6	277	145	3
John Tart	1995–2006	117–92–28	53–40–11	403	318	2
Jeremy Gunn	2006–11	66–26–12	35–13–6	194	105	2
Kevin Langan	2012–Present	86–34–20	38-10-10	~~	~~	6
Totals	1976–2018	526–295–94	228–149–38	1457	1088	7
