= 2021 NCAA Division I men's soccer season =

American college soccer season

- Number of teams: 208

Statistics
- Longest winning run: 12 games Washington (August 26–October 22)
- Longest unbeaten run: 12 games Washington (12–0–0) (August 26–October 22)
- Longest winless run: 23 games Harvard (0–22–1) (October 2, 2018–September 5, 2021)
- Longest losing run: 13 games Canisius (October 12, 2019–October 2, 2021)
- Highest attendance: 4,200; UConn 3–0 Bryant (August 27)

Tournament
- Duration: November 17 to December 12, 2021
- Most conference bids: ACC – 8 bids

College Cup
- Date: December 10–12, 2021
- Site: WakeMed Soccer Park, Cary, NC.
- Champions: Clemson
- Runners-up: Washington

Seasons
- ← 2020 2022 →

The 2021 NCAA Division I men's soccer season was the 63rd season of NCAA championship men's college soccer. After the 2020 NCAA Division I men's soccer season was disrupted by the COVID-19 pandemic, the 2021 season partially returned to normal. However, despite the development of several vaccines, the pandemic was still ongoing, which might have led to various local or regional disruptions. Also, many conferences did not fully return to their pre-COVID state, with several having changed postseason tournament formats.

The season began on August 27, 2021, and concluded on November 14. The season culminates with the 2021 NCAA Division I Men's Soccer Tournament, which was held from November 17 to December 12, with the four-team College Cup at WakeMed Soccer Park in Cary, North Carolina.

== Changes from 2020 ==
=== Coaching changes ===
Program	Outgoing coach	Manner of departure	Date of vacancy	Incoming coach	Date of appointment
Utah Valley	Greg Maas	Resigned	March 28, 2021	Kyle Beckerman	April 12, 2021
Gonzaga	Paul Meehan	Not retained	April 12, 2021	Aaron Lewis	April 12, 2021
Northwestern	Tim Lenahan	Retired	April 10, 2021	Russell Payne	May 7, 2021
Grand Canyon	Schellas Hyndman	Retired	May 10, 2021	Leonard Griffin	May 7, 2021
Central Arkansas	Ross Duncan	Resigned–Family reasons	May 22, 2021	Frank Kohlenstein	May 26, 2021
Army	Russell Payne	Hired by Northwestern	May 7, 2021	Brian Plotkin	May 27, 2021
San Francisco	Leonard Griffin	Hired by Grand Canyon	May 7, 2021	Chris Brown	May 25, 2021
La Salle	Rob Irvine	Hired by United States Soccer	July 16, 2021	Taylor Thames	August 9, 2021
South Carolina	Mark Berson	Retired	April 17, 2021	Tony Annan	April 22, 2021
Bucknell	Brendan Nash	Resigned	August 16, 2021	Matt Brown	August 16, 2021
East Tennessee State	David Casper	Fired	October 11, 2021	David Lilly	December 3, 2021

=== New programs ===
On November 27, 2017, it was announced that, in 2020, the Tritons of the University of California, San Diego, located in the San Diego district of La Jolla, would begin the transition from Division II to Division I as a member of the Big West Conference. This move was delayed by the Big west cancelling its season due to the COVID-19 pandemic.

On July 15, 2020, after months of consideration, the NCAA granted the highly unusual request of the University of St. Thomas to move directly from Division III to Division I. The school had already accepted an invitation to join the Summit League, and the Tommies entered Division I and Summit League competition in 2021.

=== Discontinued programs ===
While no schools dropped men's soccer prior to the 2021 fall season, one conference discontinued its men's soccer league. The Sun Belt Conference had six men's soccer members in 2019–20, but lost all of them by the end of the 2020–21 school year. First, Appalachian State dropped men's soccer in May 2020, citing financial impacts from COVID-19. That July saw Howard announce that it would become an associate member of the Northeast Conference in six sports, with men's soccer being one of four sports moving in July 2021. In January 2021 the ASUN Conference announced three schools as incoming full members, including Sun Belt men's soccer associate Central Arkansas. The following month saw Coastal Carolina announce that it would become a single-sport member of Conference USA, joining another in-state associate member in South Carolina. This left Georgia Southern and Georgia State as the only remaining Sun Belt men's soccer programs, and those two schools announced they would move that sport to the Mid-American Conference in late May 2021.

=== Conference realignment ===
School	Previous Conference	New Conference
Central Arkansas	Sun Belt Conference	ASUN Conference
Chicago State	Independent	Western Athletic Conference (WAC)
Coastal Carolina	Sun Belt Conference	Conference USA
Georgia Southern	Sun Belt Conference	Mid-American Conference (MAC)
Georgia State	Sun Belt Conference	Mid-American Conference (MAC)
Howard	Sun Belt Conference	Northeast Conference (NEC)
St. Thomas	Minnesota Intercollegiate Athletic Conference (MIAC) (NCAA Division III)	Summit League
SIUE	Mid-American Conference (MAC)	Missouri Valley Conference (MVC)
UC San Diego	California Collegiate Athletic Association (CCAA) (NCAA Division II)	Big West Conference

=== Other changes ===
On May 7, 2021, the Mid-American Conference announced that conference tournaments in nine sports, including men's soccer, would be reinstated effective in 2021–22. These tournaments had been suspended in 2020–21 due to COVID-19 concerns.

Conference USA announced on June 14 that current MAC men's soccer associate West Virginia would join C-USA men's soccer in 2022–23.

On September 28, the Missouri Valley Conference announced that Belmont, a men's soccer member of the Southern Conference and full member of the Ohio Valley Conference (which sponsors soccer only for women), would become a full MVC member in 2022–23.

The American Athletic Conference, which had been rocked by the announcement that three of its most prominent members (Cincinnati, Houston, and UCF, with only UCF sponsoring men's soccer), reloaded on October 21 by announcing the arrival of six new members from C-USA, with three sponsoring men's soccer—Charlotte, Florida Atlantic, and UAB. These new members are expected to join in 2023.

C-USA would see further attrition by the end of the month, with the Sun Belt Conference announcing the arrival of three new members no later than 2023—reigning national champion Marshall, another men's soccer school in Old Dominion, and Southern Miss, which sponsors the sport only for women. During a Sun Belt press conference on November 1 at which Marshall was formally introduced, conference commissioner Keith Gill announced that the Sun Belt would reinstate the sport once all new members joined. At the time, it was expected that another men's soccer school, James Madison, would join from the Colonial Athletic Association; James Madison was confirmed as an incoming Sun Belt member on November 6. These arrivals gave the Sun Belt enough men's soccer teams for an automatic NCAA tournament bid. Media reports also indicated that the Sun Belt could be a men's soccer home for several programs that would be left behind should C-USA fold, either as a men's soccer conference or entirely. While C-USA would eventually announce the arrival of four new members effective in 2023, securing its future as an all-sports conference for the time being, only one of the new members, current ASUN Conference member Liberty, sponsors men's soccer.

Realignment would reach deeper into the ranks of Division I men's soccer in the following months. Loyola Chicago announced on November 16 that it would leave the MVC for the Atlantic 10 Conference effective in July 2022. On consecutive days in late January 2022, three men's soccer-sponsoring schools announced moves to other leagues. First, on January 25, the CAA announced the entry of three new members, two of which sponsor men's soccer, effective that July. The new men's soccer-sponsoring members are Monmouth, a member of the Metro Atlantic Athletic Conference, and Stony Brook, a member of the America East Conference which had played football in the CAA since 2013. The next day saw the MVC announce that UIC would join from the Horizon League, also in July 2022.

== Season outlook ==
=== Preseason polls ===
United Soccer Coaches
Rank	Team
1	Marshall
2	Indiana
3	Pittsburgh
4	North Carolina
5	Georgetown
6	Clemson
7	Wake Forest
8	Stanford
9	Washington
10	Seton Hall
11	Penn State
12	Missouri State
13	UCF
14	Kentucky
15	Virginia Tech
16	Oregon State
17	Loyola Marymount
18	Charlotte
19	Marquette
20	New Hampshire
21	James Madison
22	Grand Canyon
23	Fordham
24	High Point
25	Coastal Carolina

Top Drawer Soccer
Rank	Team
1	Marshall
2	Indiana
3	Pittsburgh
4	North Carolina
5	Georgetown
6	Wake Forest
7	Stanford
8	Clemson
9	Washington
10	Penn State
11	Missouri State
12	Marquette
13	Seton Hall
14	UCF
15	James Madison
16	Loyola Marymount
17	Kentucky
18	Charlotte
19	Virginia Tech
20	New Hampshire
21	High Point
22	SMU
23	Saint Mary's
24	Fordham
25	Oregon State

== Regular season ==
=== Standings ===
2021 ACC men's soccer standings
	Conf.					Overall
Team	W		L		T	W		L		T
Atlantic
No. 1 Clemson +	5	–	3	–	0	16	–	5	–	2
Louisville +	5	–	3	–	0	10	–	7	–	1
No. 17 Wake Forest +	4	–	3	–	1	13	–	7	–	1
Boston College	2	–	4	–	2	6	–	7	–	2
Syracuse	2	–	5	–	1	8	–	8	–	2
NC State	1	–	5	–	2	7	–	8	–	2
Coastal
No. 12 Duke +	5	–	2	–	1	14	–	5	–	1
No. 6 Pittsburgh +	5	–	2	–	1	13	–	5	–	2
No. 4 Notre Dame ‡	4	–	2	–	2	14	–	5	–	5
North Carolina +	4	–	4	–	0	11	–	7	–	2
No. 19 Virginia Tech +	3	–	4	–	1	11	–	5	–	4
Virginia	2	–	5	–	1	6	–	9	–	3
‡ – ACC Tournament champion + – Also invited to the 2021 NCAA tournament; As of December 14, 2021; Rankings from United Soccer Coaches; Source: The ACC

2021 America East Conference men's soccer standings
	Conf.					Overall
Team	W		L		T	W		L		T
No. 9 New Hampshire +	7	–	0	–	1	17	–	2	–	2
Vermont ‡	6	–	1	–	1	13	–	5	–	2
Albany	4	–	3	–	1	10	–	7	–	1
Stony Brook	4	–	4	–	0	8	–	6	–	1
UMBC	3	–	4	–	1	8	–	8	–	3
NJIT	3	–	5	–	0	6	–	12	–	1
UMass Lowell	3	–	5	–	0	4	–	11	–	1
Binghamton	2	–	6	–	0	7	–	9	–	1
Hartford	2	–	6	–	0	4	–	10	–	3
‡ – Tournament champion + – At-large invitation to the 2021 NCAA tournament; As of December 14, 2021; Rankings from United Soccer Coaches; Source: America East

2021 American Athletic Conference men's soccer standings
	Conf.					Overall
Team	W		L		T	W		L		T
No. 10 Tulsa ‡	8	–	1	–	1	15	–	1	–	1
UCF	6	–	4	–	0	9	–	8	–	0
Memphis	5	–	4	–	1	6	–	9	–	2
SMU	5	–	4	–	1	8	–	5	–	3
South Florida	4	–	5	–	1	6	–	7	–	2
Temple	0	–	10	–	0	2	–	12	–	2
‡ – 2021 American Tournament champion + – At-large invitation to the 2021 NCAA Tournament; As of November 14, 2021; Rankings from United Soccer Coaches; Source: The American

2021 ASUN Conference men's soccer standings
	Conf.					Overall
Team	W		L		T	W		L		T
Lipscomb ‡	5	–	2	–	0	12	–	4	–	2
Central Arkansas	5	–	2	–	0	11	–	6	–	0
Florida Gulf Coast	4	–	3	–	0	4	–	8	–	1
Stetson	4	–	3	–	0	8	–	7	–	2
Liberty	3	–	4	–	0	7	–	9	–	0
Bellarmine ^{#}	2	–	4	–	1	7	–	8	–	2
Jacksonville	2	–	4	–	1	3	–	10	–	1
North Florida	2	–	5	–	0	4	–	8	–	1
‡ – 2021 ASUN Tournament champion + – At-large invitation to the 2021 NCAA Tournament ^{#} – Ineligible for post-season (In transition); As of December 14, 2021; Rankings from United Soccer Coaches; Source: ASUN

2021 Atlantic 10 Conference men's soccer standings
	Conf.					Overall
Team	W		L		T	W		L		T
No. 7 Saint Louis ‡	8	–	0	–	0	16	–	1	–	4
Rhode Island	5	–	2	–	1	10	–	5	–	2
Saint Joseph's	5	–	2	–	1	8	–	9	–	2
VCU	4	–	3	–	1	9	–	7	–	2
Fordham	4	–	3	–	1	7	–	9	–	3
Duquesne	3	–	3	–	2	10	–	7	–	2
Davidson	3	–	3	–	2	9	–	7	–	2
UMass	2	–	2	–	4	8	–	4	–	5
Dayton	3	–	4	–	1	6	–	9	–	3
George Washington	3	–	4	–	1	5	–	10	–	2
St. Bonaventure	3	–	5	–	0	4	–	10	–	1
La Salle	2	–	6	–	0	6	–	10	–	0
George Mason	0	–	8	–	0	2	–	13	–	1
‡ – 2021 Atlantic 10 Tournament champion + – At-large invitation to the 2021 NCAA tournament; As of December 14, 2021; Rankings from United Soccer Coaches; Source: Atlantic 10

2021 Big East Conference men's soccer standings
	Conf.					Overall
Team	W		L		T	W		L		T
No. 3 Georgetown ‡	8	–	2	–	0	18	–	3	–	1
No. 16 Providence +	5	–	2	–	3	12	–	5	–	4
St. John's +	5	–	3	–	2	11	–	6	–	3
Villanova +	5	–	4	–	1	12	–	8	–	1
Creighton +	5	–	4	–	1	9	–	8	–	2
Butler	5	–	4	–	1	7	–	9	–	3
Marquette	4	–	5	–	1	7	–	8	–	1
DePaul	3	–	4	–	3	7	–	7	–	3
Xavier	3	–	6	–	1	9	–	7	–	1
UConn	2	–	6	–	2	7	–	7	–	2
Seton Hall	2	–	7	–	1	6	–	8	–	3
‡ – 2021 Big East Tournament champion + – At-large invitation to the 2021 NCAA tournament; As of December 14, 2021; Rankings from United Soccer Coaches; Source: Big East

2021 Big South Conference men's soccer standings
	Conf.					Overall
Team	W		L		T	W		L		T
Campbell ‡	7	–	0	–	1	15	–	4	–	2
High Point	5	–	0	–	3	8	–	7	–	3
Longwood	4	–	3	–	1	6	–	10	–	2
Winthrop	4	–	4	–	0	8	–	10	–	0
Presbyterian	3	–	3	–	2	7	–	6	–	3
Gardner–Webb	3	–	4	–	1	5	–	12	–	1
Radford	3	–	5	–	0	5	–	11	–	0
USC Upstate	2	–	4	–	2	4	–	9	–	3
UNC Asheville	0	–	8	–	0	1	–	14	–	1
‡ – 2021 Big South Tournament champion + – At-large invitation to the 2021 NCAA tournament; As of December 14, 2021; Rankings from United Soccer Coaches; Source: Big South

2021 Big Ten Conference men's soccer standings
	Conf.					Overall
Team	W		L		T	W		L		T
No. 24 Penn State ‡	6	–	2	–	0	13	–	7	–	1
No. 23 Maryland +	5	–	2	–	1	12	–	4	–	2
No. 14 Indiana +	5	–	3	–	0	15	–	6	–	1
Michigan	4	–	3	–	1	8	–	7	–	3
Rutgers	3	–	4	–	1	9	–	6	–	2
Wisconsin	3	–	4	–	1	7	–	7	–	3
Northwestern	3	–	5	–	0	6	–	8	–	2
Michigan State	2	–	4	–	2	6	–	8	–	2
Ohio State	2	–	6	–	0	6	–	9	–	1
‡ – 2021 B1G Tournament champion + – At-large invitation to the 2021 NCAA Tournament; As of December 14, 2021; Rankings from United Soccer Coaches; Source: Big Ten

2021 Big West Conference men's soccer standings
	Conf.					Overall
Team	W		L		T	W		L		T
UC Santa Barbara ‡	6	–	1	–	2	12	–	5	–	4
UC Irvine	6	–	1	–	2	8	–	8	–	4
Cal Poly	5	–	1	–	3	7	–	6	–	4
Cal State Bakersfield	5	–	4	–	0	6	–	10	–	1
UC Davis	4	–	4	–	1	9	–	10	–	1
UC Riverside	3	–	4	–	2	9	–	7	–	3
Sacramento State	3	–	4	–	2	5	–	10	–	3
Cal State Northridge	3	–	5	–	1	4	–	13	–	1
UC San Diego ^{#}	2	–	7	–	0	5	–	11	–	0
Cal State Fullerton	1	–	7	–	1	3	–	11	–	3
‡ – 2021 Big West Tournament champion + – At-large invitation to the 2021 NCAA tournament ^{#} – Ineligible for post-season (In transition); As of December 14, 2021; Rankings from United Soccer Coaches; Source: Big West

2021 Colonial Athletic Association men's soccer standings
	Conf.					Overall
Team	W		L		T	W		L		T
No. 13 Hofstra ‡	5	–	1	–	2	18	–	2	–	2
Northeastern	5	–	2	–	1	11	–	6	–	2
James Madison *	5	–	3	–	0	11	–	5	–	1
Elon	4	–	2	–	2	9	–	8	–	2
Drexel	4	–	3	–	1	8	–	8	–	1
UNC Wilmington	4	–	3	–	1	9	–	6	–	2
William & Mary	4	–	4	–	0	7	–	7	–	0
College of Charleston	1	–	6	–	1	5	–	8	–	3
Delaware	0	–	8	–	0	2	–	12	–	1
* – Ineligible for the 2021 CAA Tournament due to postseason ban imposed by the CAA. ‡ – 2021 CAA Tournament champion + – At-large invitation to the 2021 NCAA tournament; As of December 14, 2021; Rankings from United Soccer Coaches; Source: CAA

2021 Conference USA men's soccer standings
	Conf.					Overall
Team	W		L		T	W		L		T
No. 18 FIU +	7	–	0	–	1	12	–	4	–	2
No. 15 Marshall +	5	–	1	–	2	11	–	4	–	3
Charlotte +	5	–	3	–	0	10	–	6	–	1
No. 11 Kentucky ‡	3	–	1	–	4	15	–	2	–	4
Coastal Carolina	3	–	1	–	4	6	–	5	–	4
Florida Atlantic	2	–	4	–	2	9	–	7	–	3
South Carolina	1	–	5	–	2	5	–	9	–	2
Old Dominion	1	–	5	–	2	3	–	9	–	2
UAB	0	–	7	–	1	2	–	12	–	1
‡ – 2021 C-USA Tournament champion + – At-large invitation to the 2021 NCAA Tournament; As of December 14, 2021; Rankings from United Soccer Coaches; Source: C-USA

2021 Horizon League men's soccer standings
	Conf.					Overall
Team	W		L		T	W		L		T
Oakland ‡	8	–	1	–	1	12	–	7	–	2
Cleveland State	8	–	2	–	0	10	–	8	–	0
Milwaukee	6	–	3	–	1	9	–	8	–	1
UIC	6	–	4	–	0	9	–	8	–	2
Detroit Mercy	4	–	3	–	3	5	–	7	–	5
Wright State	4	–	5	–	1	5	–	10	–	1
Robert Morris	4	–	5	–	1	5	–	11	–	1
Northern Kentucky	4	–	6	–	0	6	–	11	–	0
Purdue Fort Wayne	3	–	6	–	1	5	–	9	–	2
IUPUI	2	–	8	–	0	3	–	12	–	1
Green Bay	1	–	7	–	2	2	–	10	–	4
‡ – 2021 Horizon Tournament champion + – At-large invitation to the 2021 NCAA tournament; As of December 14, 2021; Rankings from United Soccer Coaches; Source: Horizon

2021 Ivy League men's soccer standings
	Conf.					Overall
Team	W		L		T	W		L		T
Princeton †	7	–	0	–	0	12	–	6	–	0
Yale	4	–	1	–	2	7	–	5	–	4
Cornell	4	–	2	–	1	11	–	3	–	2
Harvard	3	–	2	–	2	8	–	5	–	3
Brown	2	–	4	–	1	6	–	10	–	1
Penn	1	–	4	–	2	7	–	6	–	3
Dartmouth	1	–	5	–	1	3	–	11	–	1
Columbia	0	–	4	–	3	1	–	10	–	5
† – Conference champion + – At-large invitation to the 2021 NCAA Tournament; As of December 14, 2021; Rankings from United Soccer Coaches; Source: Ivy League

2021 Metro Atlantic Athletic Conference men's soccer standings
	Conf.					Overall
Team	W		L		T	W		L		T
Marist ‡	7	–	2	–	1	12	–	7	–	3
Saint Peter's	6	–	3	–	1	8	–	9	–	1
Niagara	6	–	4	–	0	8	–	10	–	0
Siena	5	–	3	–	2	9	–	7	–	3
Rider	5	–	4	–	1	10	–	7	–	3
Fairfield	5	–	4	–	1	7	–	9	–	2
Monmouth	5	–	5	–	0	8	–	9	–	2
Manhattan	4	–	5	–	1	6	–	9	–	2
Quinnipiac	4	–	6	–	0	9	–	8	–	0
Iona	3	–	6	–	1	6	–	9	–	2
Canisius	1	–	9	–	0	1	–	14	–	2
‡ – 2021 MAAC Tournament champion + – At-large invitation to the 2021 NCAA tournament; As of December 14, 2021; Rankings from United Soccer Coaches; Source: MAAC

2021 Mid-American Conference men's soccer standings
	Conf.					Overall
Team	W		L		T	W		L		T
No. 21 Northern Illinois ‡	4	–	0	–	2	15	–	3	–	2
No. 8 West Virginia +	4	–	1	–	1	12	–	3	–	6
Georgia State +	3	–	3	–	0	13	–	7	–	0
Bowling Green +	2	–	2	–	2	11	–	6	–	3
Western Michigan	2	–	3	–	1	7	–	6	–	5
Akron +	2	–	3	–	1	9	–	6	–	3
Georgia Southern	0	–	5	–	1	4	–	12	–	1
‡ – 2021 MAC Tournament champion + – At-large invitation to the 2021 NCAA tournament; As of December 14, 2021; Rankings from United Soccer Coaches; Source: MAC

2021 Missouri Valley Conference men's soccer standings
	Conf.					Overall
Team	W		L		T	W		L		T
No. 22 Missouri State ‡	10	–	0	–	0	17	–	2	–	0
Loyola Chicago	6	–	3	–	1	9	–	5	–	2
SIU Edwardsville	4	–	6	–	0	6	–	10	–	2
Evansville	3	–	6	–	1	4	–	14	–	2
Drake	3	–	7	–	0	6	–	9	–	0
Bradley	3	–	7	–	0	5	–	12	–	1
‡ – 2021 MVC Tournament champion + – At-large invitation to the 2021 NCAA tournament; As of December 14, 2021; Rankings from United Soccer Coaches; Source: MVC

2021 Northeast Conference men's soccer standings
	Conf.					Overall
Team	W		L		T	W		L		T
LIU ‡	7	–	2	–	0	11	–	4	–	4
St. Francis Brooklyn	7	–	2	–	0	10	–	5	–	2
Fairleigh Dickinson	6	–	1	–	2	8	–	7	–	3
Merrimack ^{#}	6	–	3	–	0	7	–	9	–	1
Bryant	5	–	4	–	0	6	–	7	–	3
Sacred Heart	2	–	4	–	3	2	–	10	–	5
Saint Francis (PA)	3	–	6	–	0	7	–	8	–	0
Central Connecticut	2	–	5	–	2	2	–	12	–	2
Howard	2	–	6	–	1	3	–	10	–	3
Mount St. Mary's	1	–	8	–	0	3	–	15	–	0
‡ – 2021 NEC Tournament champion + – At-large invitation to the 2021 NCAA Tournament ^{#} – Ineligible for post-season (In transition); As of November 14, 2021; Rankings from United Soccer Coaches; Source: NEC

2021 Patriot League men's soccer standings
	Conf.					Overall
Team	W		L		T	W		L		T
Loyola (MD) ‡	7	–	2	–	0	10	–	6	–	4
American	6	–	2	–	1	9	–	5	–	4
Holy Cross	5	–	3	–	1	8	–	8	–	3
Lehigh	5	–	4	–	0	5	–	11	–	2
Navy	5	–	4	–	0	12	–	6	–	1
Army	4	–	4	–	1	8	–	7	–	3
Lafayette	3	–	3	–	3	7	–	7	–	4
Boston University	3	–	4	–	2	4	–	9	–	3
Bucknell	2	–	5	–	2	4	–	10	–	3
Colgate	0	–	9	–	0	0	–	18	–	0
‡ – 2021 Patriot Tournament Champion + – At-large invitation to the 2021 NCAA tournament; As of December 14, 2021; Rankings from United Soccer Coaches; Source: Patriot League

2021 Pac-12 Conference men's soccer standings
	Conf.					Overall
Team	W		L		T	W		L		T
No. 5 Oregon State †	7	–	1	–	2	14	–	2	–	4
No. 2 Washington +	6	–	1	–	2	18	–	2	–	2
No. 25 UCLA +	5	–	4	–	1	11	–	7	–	1
Stanford	2	–	4	–	4	6	–	6	–	6
San Diego State	2	–	7	–	0	8	–	7	–	2
California	1	–	6	–	1	3	–	9	–	3
† – Conference champion + – At-large invitation to the 2021 NCAA tournament; As of December 14, 2021; Rankings from United Soccer Coaches; Source: Pac-12

2021 Southern Conference men's soccer standings
	Conf.					Overall
Team	W		L		T	W		L		T
UNC Greensboro	5	–	1	–	0	13	–	4	–	1
Mercer ‡	4	–	1	–	1	10	–	8	–	1
Belmont	4	–	2	–	0	13	–	4	–	1
Furman	4	–	2	–	0	7	–	9	–	1
East Tennessee State	1	–	3	–	2	4	–	7	–	3
Wofford	1	–	4	–	1	5	–	10	–	1
VMI	0	–	6	–	0	1	–	16	–	1
‡– SoCon Tournament Champion + – At-large invitation to the 2021 NCAA tournament; As of December 14, 2021; Rankings from United Soccer Coaches; Source: SoCon

2021 Summit League men's soccer standings
	Conf.					Overall
Team	W		L		T	W		L		T
Oral Roberts	4	–	1	–	1	11	–	2	–	2
Denver ‡	4	–	1	–	1	10	–	4	–	5
Omaha	4	–	2	–	0	6	–	10	–	1
Kansas City	2	–	2	–	2	3	–	7	–	5
Western Illinois	2	–	4	–	0	2	–	13	–	1
St. Thomas ^{#}	2	–	4	–	0	3	–	11	–	2
Eastern Illinois	1	–	5	–	0	2	–	12	–	1
‡ – 2021 Summit Tournament Champion + – At-large invitation to the 2021 NCAA tournament ^{#} – Ineligible for post-season (In transition); As of December 14, 2021; Rankings from United Soccer Coaches; Source: Summit

2021 West Coast Conference men's soccer standings
	Conf.					Overall
Team	W		L		T	W		L		T
No. 20 Santa Clara †	5	–	0	–	2	12	–	2	–	4
Pacific	4	–	1	–	2	9	–	5	–	2
Loyola Marymount	4	–	2	–	1	12	–	4	–	2
Saint Mary's	4	–	2	–	1	11	–	6	–	1
Portland +	4	–	2	–	1	11	–	7	–	1
Gonzaga	2	–	5	–	0	7	–	10	–	0
San Diego	1	–	6	–	0	2	–	15	–	0
San Francisco	0	–	6	–	1	2	–	13	–	1
† – Conference champion + – At-large invitation to the 2021 NCAA Tournament; As of December 14, 2021; Rankings from United Soccer Coaches; Source: WCC

2021 Western Athletic Conference men's soccer standings
	Conf.					Overall
Team	W		L		T	W		L		T
Grand Canyon +	9	–	2	–	0	15	–	4	–	1
Seattle †	8	–	3	–	0	13	–	8	–	1
Air Force	8	–	3	–	0	10	–	8	–	1
San Jose State	7	–	2	–	2	10	–	7	–	3
California Baptist ^{#}	6	–	3	–	2	11	–	4	–	3
Utah Valley	6	–	4	–	0	9	–	6	–	2
Texas–Rio Grande Valley	5	–	5	–	0	8	–	9	–	0
Incarnate Word	4	–	6	–	1	5	–	10	–	2
Dixie State ^{#}	3	–	7	–	1	4	–	13	–	1
UNLV	3	–	8	–	0	7	–	11	–	0
Houston Baptist	2	–	9	–	0	4	–	14	–	0
Chicago State	0	–	9	–	2	2	–	13	–	3
† – 2021 WAC Tournament Champion + – At-large invitation to the 2021 NCAA tournament # – Ineligible (In transition); As of December 14, 2021; Rankings from United Soccer Coaches; Source: WAC

== Postseason ==
=== Conference winners and tournaments ===
Conference	Regular Season Champion(s)	Tournament Winner	Conference Tournament	Tournament Dates	Tournament Venue (City)
ACC	Atlantic – Clemson (Note: Earned higher seed within division in conference tournament.) & Louisville; Coastal – Duke & Pittsburgh (Note: Top seed in conference tournament.)	Notre Dame	2021 Tournament	November 3–14	All matches before final: Campus sites, hosted by higher seed Final: WakeMed Soccer Park • Cary, North Carolina
America East	New Hampshire	Vermont	2021 Tournament	November 6–13	Campus sites, hosted by higher seed
American	Tulsa	Tulsa	2021 Tournament	November 10–13	Hosted by regular-season champion
ASUN	Central Arkansas & Lipscomb	Lipscomb	2021 Tournament (Note: Not to be confused with the 2020–21 ASUN tournament, which the conference branded as the "2021 Spring" edition.)	November 8–16	Quarterfinals and semifinals: Campus sites, hosted by top two seeds Final: Hosted by top remaining seed
Atlantic 10	Saint Louis	Saint Louis	2021 Tournament	November 6–14	Quarterfinals: Campus sites, hosted by higher seed Semifinals and final: Hosted by top remaining seed
Big East	Georgetown	Georgetown	2021 Tournament	November 6–14	Quarterfinals: Campus sites, hosted by higher seed Semifinals and final: Hosted by top remaining seed
Big South	Campbell	Campbell	2021 Tournament	November 7–14	Campus sites, hosted by higher seed
Big Ten	Penn State	Penn State	2021 Tournament	November 7–14	Campus sites, hosted by higher seed
Big West	UC Irvine & UC Santa Barbara	UC Santa Barbara	2021 Tournament	November 3–13	Campus sites, hosted by higher seed
CAA	Hofstra	Hofstra	2021 Tournament	November 11–14	Hofstra Soccer Stadium • Hempstead, New York
C-USA	FIU	Kentucky	2021 Tournament	November 10–14	Transamerica Field • Charlotte, North Carolina
Horizon	Oakland	Oakland	2021 Tournament	November 7–13	Quarterfinals: Campus sites, hosted by Nos. 3 and 4 seeds Semifinals and final: Hosted by regular-season champion
Ivy	Princeton		No Tournament		
MAAC	Marist	Marist	2021 Tournament	November 7–14	Campus sites, hosted by higher seed
MAC	Northern Illinois	Northern Illinois	2021 Tournament	November 10–13	Hosted by regular-season champion
Missouri Valley	Missouri State	Missouri State	2021 Tournament	November 9–14	Quarterfinals: Campus sites, hosted by higher seed Semifinals and final: Hosted by regular-season champion
Northeast	LIU & St. Francis Brooklyn	LIU	2021 Tournament	November 12–14	Hosted by regular-season champion
Pac-12	Oregon State		No Tournament		
Patriot	Loyola Maryland	Loyola (MD)	2021 Tournament	November 6–13	Campus sites, hosted by higher seed
SoCon	UNC Greensboro	Mercer	2021 Tournament	November 1–13/14	Campus sites, hosted by higher seed
The Summit	Denver & Oral Roberts	Denver	2021 Tournament	November 11–13	John MacKenzie Alumni Field • Macomb, Illinois
WCC	Santa Clara		No Tournament		
WAC	Grand Canyon	Seattle	2021 Tournament	November 10–14	GCU Stadium • Phoenix, Arizona

- * = Ineligible, in transition from Division II

=== Major upsets ===
In this list, a "major upset" is defined as a game won by an unranked team that defeats a ranked team, or a team ranked 10 spots lower than the other team.

All rankings are from the United Soccer Coaches Poll.

Date	Winner	Score	Loser
August 26	VCU	2–0	No. 7 Wake Forest
August 26	SMU	3–1	No. 8 Stanford
August 26	FIU	4–0	No. 13 UCF
August 26	Maryland	1–0	No. 18 Charlotte
August 26	Providence	3–0	No. 23 Fordham
August 26	Davidson	3–1	No. 24 High Point
August 29	No. 15 Virginia Tech	3–2	No. 1 Marshall
August 30	West Virginia	2–1	No. 3 Pittsburgh
September 3	West Virginia	3–1	No. 17 Penn State
September 3	Creighton	3–0	No. 1 Indiana
September 3	Tulsa	3–0	No. 8 Missouri State
September 4	FIU	1–0	No. 12 VCU
September 6	No. 19 Akron	2–1	No. 3 Pittsburgh
September 6	Seattle	1–0	No. 24 Duke
September 6	Grand Canyon	1–0	No. 22 Oregon State
September 6	Tulsa	1–0	No. 13 Marquette
September 10	Louisville	3–0	No. 25 Wake Forest
September 10	No. 15 Pittsburgh	4–0	No. 4 North Carolina
September 10	Northern Illinois	3–0	No. 18 Marquette
September 11	No. 19 Duke	1–0	No. 6 Virginia Tech
September 13	Wisconsin	1–0	No. 18 Marquette
September 15	Ohio State	1–0	No. 7 Akron
September 16	UCLA	2–0	No. 23 Stanford
September 17	Wake Forest	3–1	No. 5 Pittsburgh
September 17	Rutgers	2–1	No. 11 Indiana
September 17	Bowling Green	2–0	No. 13 FIU
September 18	Providence	3–2	No. 19 Seton Hall
September 21	UNC Greensboro	3–1	No. 2 Clemson
September 21	Butler	3–1	No. 18 Lipscomb
September 24	Wisconsin	2–0	No. 21 Rutgers
September 25	No. 15 Pittsburgh	2–0	No. 2 Clemson
September 25	Stetson	3–2	No. 18 Lipscomb
September 29	Ohio State	2–1	No. 17 Bowling Green
September 30	Oregon State	4–3	No. 23 UCLA
October 2	Pacific	1–0	No. 9 Loyola Marymount
October 3	Wisconsin	1–0	No. 8 Maryland
October 3	Oregon State	2–0	No. 13 San Diego State
October 5	Penn State	2–0	No. 22 Rutgers
October 9	No. 13 Pittsburgh	3–2	No. 3 Duke
October 9	NIU	2–0	No. 4 West Virginia
October 9	Memphis	3–2	No. 10 SMU
October 9	Notre Dame	2–0	No. 21 Clemson
October 10	UCF	3–2	No. 6 Tulsa
October 10	Michigan State	2–1	No. 22 Rutgers
October 13	No. 22 Providence	3–0	No. 1 Georgetown
October 14	UCLA	2–1	No. 14 Loyola Marymount
October 15	No. 23 Clemson	3–2	No. 9 Duke
October 16	Wake Forest	3–1	No. 5 Virginia Tech
October 16	Notre Dame	1–0	No. 7 Pittsburgh
October 16	UNC Wilmington	1–0	No. 15 James Madison
October 16	Belmont	2–1	No. 16 UNC Greensboro
October 16	Yale	1–0	No. 19 Cornell
October 16	Butler	2–1	No. 20 Providence
October 16	UCF	2–1	No. 24 SMU
October 16	San Jose State	2–1	No. 25 Grand Canyon
October 19	North Carolina	2–0	No. 15 Loyola Marymount
October 21	California	2–1	No. 22 UCLA
October 22	Akron	5–1	No. 14 Bowling Green
October 23	Syracuse	2–0	No. 6 Clemson
October 23	Portland	1–0	No. 15 Loyola Marymount
October 24	North Carolina	2–0	No. 13 Virginia Tech
October 26	Penn State	3–2	No. 7 Maryland
October 29	North Carolina	3–1	No. 11 Notre Dame
October 30	Marquette	1–0	No. 1 Georgetown
October 30	Charlotte	2–1	No. 5 Kentucky
October 30	Princeton	2–1	No. 20 Cornell

=== Early season tournaments ===
Several universities hosted early season soccer tournaments.

Name	Date(s)	Stadium	City	No. teams	Champion
Carolina Nike Classic	August 26–29	Dorrance Field	Chapel Hill, North Carolina	4	VCU
Emerald City Classic	August 26–29	Husky Soccer Stadium	Seattle, Washington	4	Washington
Fairfield Inn by Marriott JMU Invitational	August 26–29	Sentara Park	Harrisonburg, Virginia	4	Virginia Tech
HBU Tournament	August 26–29	Sorrels Field	Houston, Texas	4	Florida Atlantic
John Rennie Invitational	August 27–29	Koskinen Stadium	Durham, North Carolina	4	Duke
Wolstein Classic	August 27–29	Jesse Owens Memorial Stadium	Columbus, Ohio	4	Dayton
Portland Tournament	August 27–30	Merlo Field	Portland, Oregon	4	
Dayton Classic	September 2–6	Baujan Field	Dayton, Ohio	3	
Soccer for the Cure	September 3–5	BBVA Field	Birmingham, Alabama	4	
adidas/IU Credit Union Classic	September 3–6	Bill Armstrong Stadium	Bloomington, Indiana	4	
George Tarantini Classic	September 3–6	Dail Soccer Field	Raleigh, North Carolina	4	Seton Hall

== Award winners ==
=== All-America teams ===
2021 United Soccer Coaches All-America Teams
First Team	Second Team	Third Team
Jan Hoffelner, GK, Kentucky; Kyle Hiebert, DF, Missouri State; Ryan Sailor, DF, Washington; Adam Savill, DF, New Hampshire; Benjamin Bender, MF, Maryland; Yannick Bright, MF, New Hampshire; Sofiane Djeffal, MF, Oregon State; Sean Zawadzki, MF, Georgetown; Simon Becher, FW, Saint Louis; Dylan Teves, FW, Washington; Thorleifur Úlfarsson, FW, Duke	Roman Celentano, GK, Indiana; Oskar Ågren, DF, Clemson; Kipp Keller, DF, Saint Louis; Jasper Löeffelsend, DF, Pittsburgh; Pedro Dolabella, MF, Marshall; Hendrik Hebbeker, MF, Hofstra; Dante Polvara, MF, Georgetown; Kian Yari, MF, Missouri State; Theo Collomb, FW, UNC Greensboro; Diego Gutierrez, FW, Creighton; Kyle Holcomb, FW, Wake Forest; Jack Lynn, FW, Notre Dame	Luka Gavran, GK, St. John's; Mariano Fazio, DF, Tulsa; Daniel Munie, DF, Indiana; Will Sands, DF, Georgetown; Djarne Thiesen, DF, West Virginia; Vitor Dias, MF, Marshall; Tyrone Mondi, MF, Oregon State; Peter Stroud, MF, Duke; Josh Dolling, FW, Missouri State; Kevin O'Toole, FW, Princeton; Diogo Pacheco, FW, Akron; Tola Showunmi, FW, New Hampshire

=== Major player of the year awards ===
- Hermann Trophy: Dante Polvara, Georgetown
- TopDrawerSoccer.com National Player of the Year Award: Dante Polvara, Georgetown

=== Other major awards ===
- United Soccer Coaches College Coach of the Year: Mike Noonan
- Bill Jeffrey Award: Lesle Gallimore
- Jerry Yeagley Award:
- Mike Berticelli Award: Deborah Raber
- NCAA Tournament MVP: Offensive: Isaiah Reid Defensive: George Marks

=== Conference player and coaches of the year ===
Conference	Conference Player of the Year	Offensive Player of the Year	Defensive Player of the Year	Midfielder of the Year	Goalkeeper of the Year	Rookie of the Year	Conference Coach of the Year
ACC	—N/a	Thorleifur Úlfarsson (Duke)	Jasper Löffelsend (Pitt)	Peter Stroud (Duke)	—N/a	Shak Mohammed (Duke)	Jay Vidovich (Pitt)
America East	—N/a	Tola Showunmi (New Hampshire)	Adam Savill (New Hampshire)	Yannick Bright (New Hampshire)	Nate Silveira (Vermont)	Jonas Bickus (Stony Brook)	Marc Hubbard (New Hampshire)
American	—N/a	Alex Meinhard (Tulsa)	Mariano Fazio (Tulsa)	Henry Sach (Tulsa)	Alex Lopez (Tulsa); Kazuna Takase (South Florida)	Alex Lopez (Tulsa)	Tom McIntosh (Tulsa)
ASUN	Alberto Suarez (Central Arkansas)	—N/a	Alberto Suarez (Central Arkansas); Noah Gulden (Lipscomb)	—N/a	Gustavo Vasconcelos (FGCU)	Nelson Pereira (Stetson)	Frank Kohlenstein (Central Arkansas)
Atlantic 10	—N/a	Simon Becher (Saint Louis)	Kipp Keller (Saint Louis)	Célio Pompeu (VCU)	—N/a	Isak Oystese (Rhode Island)	Kevin Kalish (Saint Louis)
Big East	—N/a	Diego Gutierrez (Creighton)	Sean Zawadzki (Georgetown)	Dante Polvara (Georgetown)	Luka Gavran (St. John's)	Matéo Leveque (UConn)	Brian Wiese (Georgetown)
Big South	—N/a	Tyler Young (Campbell)	Bissafi Dotte (Campbell)	—N/a	Holden Trent (High Point)	Brigham Larsen (Winthrop)	Dustin Fonder (Campbell)
Big Ten	—N/a	Peter Mangione (Penn State)	Daniel Munie (Indiana)	Ben Bender (Maryland)	Roman Celentano (Indiana)	Joshua Bolma (Maryland)	Jeff Cook (Penn State)
Big West	—N/a	Maximilian Arfsten (UC Davis)	Henry Davies (UC Santa Barbara)	Robert Mejia (UC Davis)	Gordon Botterill (UC Irvine)	Francesco Montanile (UC Irvine)	Yossi Raz (UC Irvine)
Colonial	Chris Donovan (Drexel)	—N/a	George O’Malley (Hofstra)	—N/a	—N/a	Mason Tatafu (Hofstra)	Richard Nuttall (Hofstra)
Conference USA	Pedro Dolabella (Marshall)	Pedro Dolabella (Marshall)	Nathan Dossantos (Marshall)	Vitor Dias (Marshall); Pedro Dolabella (Marshall)	Jan Hoffelner (Kentucky)	Bernardo Dos Santos Monteiro (FIU)	Kyle Russell (FIU)
Horizon	Jannis Schmidt (Cleveland State)	Bojan Kolevski (Cleveland State)	Thomas M’Barek (Cleveland State)	—N/a	Jonathan Kliewer (Detroit Mercy)	Jesse Randall (Northern Kentucky)	Eric Pogue (Oakland)
Ivy	—N/a	Kevin O'Toole (Princeton)	Elian Haddock (Yale)	—N/a	—N/a	Alessandro Arlotti (Harvard)	Jim Barlow (Princeton)
MAAC	—N/a	Zaki Alibou (Rider)	Huib Achterkamp (Marist)	—N/a	Sam Ilin (Marist)	Jacob Sandun Arachchige-Jensen (Siena)	Matt Viggiano (Marist)
Mid-American	Nick Markanich (Northern Illinois)	—N/a	—N/a	—N/a	—N/a	Alberto Anaya (Bowling Green)	Ryan Swan (Northern Illinois)
Missouri Valley	Billy Hency (Loyola Chicago)	—N/a	Kyle Hiebert (Missouri State)	Kian Yari (Missouri State)	Jared Brown (Drake)	Jose Vivas (Evansville)	Pat Flinn (Drake)
Northeast	El Mahdi Youssoufi (St. Francis Brooklyn)	—N/a	Harald Sollund (St. Francis Brooklyn)	—N/a	Demetri Skoumbakis (LIU)	Tony Gomez (Fairleigh Dickinson)	Tom Giovatto (St. Francis Brooklyn)
Pac-12	Sofiane Djeffal (Oregon State)	Tyrone Mondi (Oregon State)	Ryan Sailor (Washington)	—N/a	—N/a	Joran Gerbet (Oregon State)	Terry Boss (Oregon State)
Patriot	—N/a	Jacob Williams (Navy)	Matt Nocita (Navy)	Justin Ingram (Loyola)	Chase Vosvick (Loyola)	Evan Jones (Holy Cross)	Steve Nichols (Loyola)
SoCon	Théo Collomb (UNC Greensboro)	—N/a	—N/a	—N/a	Niclas Wild (UNC Greensboro)	J.C. Ngando (UNC Greensboro)	David Costa (Belmont); Chris Rich (UNC Greensboro)
Summit	—N/a	Dante Brigida (Oral Roberts)	Liam Johnson (Denver)	—N/a	Cooper Clark (Kansas City)	Felipe D’Agostini (Oral Roberts)	Ryan Bush (Oral Roberts)
WAC	—N/a	Tristan Trager (Air Force)	Esai Easley (Grand Canyon)	—N/a	—N/a	Diego Castillo (Utah Valley)	Simon Tobin (San Jose State)
West Coast	—N/a	Noel Caliskan (LMU)	Nick Dauchot (LMU)	Noel Caliskan (LMU)	Jacob Jackson (LMU)	Erik Centeno (Pacific)	Cam Rast (Santa Clara)

== Attendances ==
The 50 men's college soccer teams with the highest average home attendance:

#	Football club	Average attendance
1	Saint Louis Billikens	3,061
2	UConn Huskies	2,731
3	Maryland Terrapins	2,321
4	Clemson Tigers	2,275
5	New Hampshire Wildcats	2,076
6	Creighton Bluejays	1,985
7	Indiana Hoosiers	1,917
8	Cal Poly Mustangs	1,877
9	UC Santa Barbara Gauchos	1,853
10	Wake Forest Demon Deacons	1,642
11	South Carolina Gamecocks	1,622
12	Michigan State Spartans	1,580
13	Akron Zips	1,565
14	Grand Canyon Antelopes	1,555
15	Rhode Island Rams	1,478
16	Marshall Thundering Herd	1,446
17	Washington Huskies	1,445
18	Georgetown Hoyas	1,277
19	UMBC Retrievers	1,256
20	Penn State Nittany Lions	1,222
21	Virginia Cavaliers	1,189
22	Utah Valley Wolverines	1,169
23	Portland Pilots	1,153
24	West Virginia Mountaineers	1,119
25	North Carolina Tar Heels	1,115
26	Pittsburgh Panthers	1,089
27	Syracuse Orange	1,071
28	Virginia Tech Hokies	1,048
29	Michigan Wolverines	1,031
30	Ohio State Buckeyes	1,009
31	NC State Wolfpack	985
32	Seton Hall Pirates	959
33	St. John's Red Storm	946
34	California Golden Bears	901
35	Boston College Eagles	896
36	UCLA Bruins	882
37	Binghamton Bearcats	864
38	Stanford Cardinal	861
39	Kentucky Wildcats	811
40	Duke Blue Devils	790
41	Charlotte 49ers	788
42	Denver Pioneers	787
43	Louisville Cardinals	776
44	Oregon State Beavers	765
45	Notre Dame Fighting Irish	759
46	Davidson Wildcats	742
47	UNCW Seahawks	725
48	SMU Mustangs	710
49	Bakersfield Roadrunners	708
50	Providence Friars	692

== See also ==
- College soccer
- List of NCAA Division I men's soccer programs
- 2021 in American soccer
- 2021 NCAA Division I Men's Soccer Tournament
- 2021 NCAA Division I women's soccer season
