= 2021 NCAA Division I men's soccer tournament =

- Classification: Division I
- Teams: 48
- Site: WakeMed Soccer Park (Semifinal and Final); Cary, North Carolina
- Champions: Clemson (3rd title)
- Winning coach: Mike Noonan (1st title)
- MVP: Isaiah Reid (offense); George Marks (defense) (Clemson)
- Broadcast: ESPNU

The 2021 NCAA Division I men's soccer tournament was the 63rd edition of the NCAA Division I men's soccer tournament, a postseason tournament that determined the national champion of the 2021 NCAA Division I men's soccer season. The College Cup, the semifinals and finals of the tournament, were played on December 10 and December 12 in Cary, North Carolina.

== Qualification ==
Pending the state of the COVID-19 pandemic, 48 teams have been selected to participate. There were 23 automatic bids: the 20 conference tournament champions and to the regular season winners of the Ivy League, Pac-12 Conference, and West Coast Conference, which do not have tournaments. The remaining 25 berths are determined through an at-large process based upon the Ratings Percentage Index (RPI) of teams that did not automatically qualify.

The NCAA Selection Committee also named the top sixteen seeds for the tournament, with those teams receiving an automatic bye into the second round of the tournament. The remaining 32 teams play in a single-elimination match in the first round of the tournament for the right to play a seeded team in the second round.

=== Qualified teams ===
Team	Qualified as	Qualified on	Qualification type	Previous appearances in tournament	Previous best performance
Notre Dame	ACC champions	November 14, 2021	Automatic	22 (1988, 1993, 1994, 1996, 2001, 2002, 2003, 2004, 2005, 2006, 2007, 2008, 2009, 2010, 2012, 2013, 2014, 2015, 2016, 2017, 2018, 2019)	Winners (2013)
Vermont	Am. East champions	November 14, 2021	Automatic	10 (1975, 1977, 1978, 1981, 1989, 1990, 2000, 2007, 2015, 2016 )	Quarterfinals (1989)
Tulsa	American champions	November 14, 2021	Automatic	11 (1991, 2003, 2004, 2007, 2008, 2009, 2010, 2012, 2014, 2015, 2016 )	Quarterfinals (2004, 2009)
Lipscomb	ASUN champions	November 13, 2021	Automatic	2 (2017, 2018)	First round (2017, 2018)
Saint Louis	Atlantic 10 champions	November 14, 2021	Automatic	48 (1959, 1960, 1961, 1962, 1963, 1964, 1965, 1966, 1967, 1968, 1969, 1970, 1971, 1972, 1973, 1974, 1975, 1976, 1977, 1978, 1979, 1980, 1981, 1983, 1984, 1986, 1987, 1988, 1989, 1990, 1991, 1992, 1993, 1994, 1995, 1997, 1998, 1999, 2000, 2001, 2002, 2003, 2006, 2007, 2008, 2009, 2012, 2014)	Winners (1959, 1960. 1962, 1963, 1965. 1967, 1969, 1970, 1972, 1973)
Georgetown	Big East champions	November 14, 2021	Automatic	11 (1994, 1997, 2010, 2012, 2013, 2014, 2015, 2017, 2018, 2019, 2020)	Winners (2019)
Campbell	Big South champions	November 14, 2021	Automatic	3 (2007, 2018, 2019)	Second round (2019)
Penn State	Big Ten champions	November 14, 2021	Automatic	34 (1970, 1971, 1972, 1973, 1974, 1975, 1976, 1977, 1978, 1979, 1980, 1981, 1982, 1984, 1985, 1986, 1988, 1989, 1992, 1993, 1994, 1995, 1998, 1999, 2001, 2002, 2004, 2005, 2009, 2010, 2013, 2014, 2019, 2020)	Semifinals (1979)
UC Santa Barbara	Big West champions	November 13, 2021	Automatic	13 (2002, 2003, 2004, 2005, 2006, 2007, 2008, 2009, 2010, 2011, 2013, 2015, 2019)	Winners (2006)
Hofstra	CAA champions	November 14, 2021	Automatic	5 (1968, 2004, 2005, 2006, 2015)	Second round (2004, 2006, 2015)
Kentucky	C-USA champions	November 14, 2021	Automatic	11 (1999, 2000, 2001, 2003, 2012, 2014, 2015, 2016, 2018, 2019, 2020)	Quarterfinals (2018)
Oakland	Horizon champions	November 13, 2021	Automatic	7 (2002, 2003, 2007, 2008, 2010, 2014, 2015)	Second round (2007, 2014)
Princeton	Ivy champions	November 13, 2021	Automatic	10 (1977, 1979, 1989, 1993, 1995, 1999, 2001, 2009, 2010, 2018)	Semifinals (1993)
Marist	MAAC champions	November 14, 2021	Automatic	2 (2004, 2005)	First round (2004, 2005)
Northern Illinois	MAC champions	November 14, 2021	Automatic	3 (1973, 2006, 2011)	Round of 16 (2011)
Missouri State	MVC champions	November 14, 2021	Automatic	5 (1997, 1999, 2009, 2019, 2020)	Round of 16 (2020)
LIU	NEC champions	November 14, 2021	Automatic	15 (1963, 1965, 1966, 1967, 1971, 1972, 1973, 1977, 1981, 1982, 1985, 1986, 2004, 2015, 2018)	Runners-Up (1966)
Oregon State	Pac-12 champions	November 14, 2021	Automatic	5 (2002, 2003, 2014, 2018, 2020)	Second round (2014)
Loyola (MD)	Patriot champions	November 14, 2021	Automatic	8 (1986, 1987, 1993, 2001, 2002, 2007, 2008, 2009)	Quarterfinals (1986, 1987)
Mercer	SoCon champions	November 14, 2021	Automatic	4 (2001, 2016, 2017, 2019)	First round (2001, 2016, 2017, 2019)
Denver	Summit champions	November 13, 2021	Automatic	9 (1970, 2008, 2010, 2013, 2014, 2015, 2016, 2018, 2019)	Semifinals (2016)
Seattle	WAC champions	November 14, 2021	Automatic	4 (2013, 2015, 2017, 2019)	Round of 16 (2015)
Santa Clara	WCC champions	November 14, 2021	Automatic	20 (1973, 1978, 1979, 1989, 1990, 1991, 1993, 1995, 1996, 1997, 1998, 1999, 2001, 2003, 2004, 2005, 2006, 2007, 2010, 2015)	Winners (1989)
Washington	No. 1 RPI	November 15, 2021	At-large	27 (1968, 1972, 1973, 1976, 1978, 1982, 1989, 1992, 1995, 1996, 1997, 1998, 1999, 2000, 2001, 2003, 2004, 2006, 2007, 2012, 2013, 2014, 2016, 2017, 2018, 2019, 2020)	Quarterfinals (2013, 2019, 2020)
Duke	No. 4 RPI	November 15, 2021	At-large	27 (1972, 1980, 1981, 1982, 1983, 1985, 1986, 1987, 1989, 1992, 1993, 1994, 1995, 1998, 1999, 2000, 2002, 2004, 2005, 2006, 2007, 2008, 2009, 2010, 2011, 2017, 2018)	Winners (1986)
Pittsburgh	No. 7 RPI	November 15, 2021	At-large	4 (1962, 1965, 2019, 2020)	Semifinals (2020)
Clemson	No. 9 RPI	November 15, 2021	At-large	33 (1972, 1973, 1974, 1975, 1976, 1977, 1978, 1979, 1981, 1982, 1983, 1984, 1985, 1987, 1990, 1991, 1993, 1995, 1997, 1998, 2000, 2001, 2002, 2003, 2005, 2006, 2013, 2014, 2015, 2016, 2017, 2019, 2020)	Winners (1984, 1987)
New Hampshire	No. 11 RPI	November 15, 2021	At-large	5 (1994, 2017, 2018, 2019,2020)	Round of 16 (2017)
Grand Canyon	No. 12 RPI	November 15, 2021	At-large	2 (2019, 2020)	Second round (2020)
Indiana	No. 13 RPI	November 15, 2021	At-large	45 (1974, 1976, 1977, 1978, 1979, 1980, 1981, 1982, 1983, 1984, 1985, 1987, 1988, 1989, 1990, 1991, 1992, 1993, 1994, 1995, 1996, 1997, 1998, 1999, 2000, 2001, 2002, 2003, 2004, 2005, 2006, 2007, 2008, 2009, 2010, 2011, 2012, 2013, 2014, 2015, 2016, 2017, 2018, 2019, 2020)	Winners (1982, 1983, 1988, 1998, 1999, 2003, 2004, 2012)
Providence	No. 15 RPI	November 15, 2021	At-large	10 (1983, 2005, 2006, 2007, 2010, 2011, 2013, 2014, 2016, 2019)	Semifinals (2014)
Marshall	No. 17 RPI	November 15, 2021	At-large	2 (2019, 2020)	Winners (2020)
FIU	No. 18 RPI	November 15, 2021	At-large	10 (1991, 1994, 1996, 1997, 2001, 2002, 2003, 2004, 2015, 2017)	Runners-up (1996)
West Virginia	No. 19 RPI	November 15, 2021	At-large	14 (1966, 1968, 1971, 1972, 1973, 1981, 1992, 2005, 2006, 2007, 2010, 2011, 2018, 2019)	Quarterfinals (1981)
North Carolina	No. 20 RPI	November 15, 2021	At-large	27 (1968, 1987, 1988, 1990, 1991, 1993, 1994, 1999, 2000, 2001, 2002, 2003, 2004, 2005, 2006, 2008, 2009, 2010, 2011, 2012, 2013, 2014, 2105, 2016, 2017, 2018, 2020)	Winners (2001, 2011)
Maryland	No. 22 RPI	November 15, 2021	At-large	38 (1959, 1960, 1961, 1962, 1963, 1964, 1967, 1968, 1969, 1970, 1976, 1986, 1994, 1995, 1996, 1997, 1998, 1999, 2001, 2002, 2003, 2004, 2005, 2006, 2007, 2008, 2009, 2010, 2011, 2012, 2013, 2014, 2015, 2016, 2017, 2018, 2019, 2020)	Winners (1968, 2005, 2008, 2018)
Virginia Tech	No. 24 RPI	November 15, 2021	At-large	9 (2003, 2005, 2006, 2007, 2016, 2017, 2018, 2019, 2020)	Semifinals (2007)
UCLA	No. 25 RPI	November 15, 2021	At-large	45 (1968, 1970, 1971, 1972, 1973,1974, 1975, 1976, 1977, 1980, 1983, 1984, 1985, 1986, 1987, 1988, 1989, 1990, 1991, 1992, 1993, 1994, 1995, 1996, 1997, 1998, 1999, 2000, 2001, 2002, 2003, 2004, 2005, 2006, 2007, 2008, 2009, 2010, 2011, 2012, 2013, 2014, 2015, 2016, 2018)	Winners (1985, 1990, 1997, 2002)
Creighton	No. 26 RPI	November 15, 2021	At-large	24 (1992, 1993, 1994, 1995, 1996, 1997, 1998, 1999, 2000, 2001, 2002, 2003, 2004, 2005, 2006, 2007, 2008, 2010, 2011, 2012, 2013, 2014, 2015, 2016 )	Runners-up (2000)
Akron	No. 27 RPI	November 15, 2021	At-large	29 (1966, 1967, 1968, 1970, 1971, 1975, 1976, 1983, 1984, 1985, 1986, 1998, 2001, 2002, 2003, 2004, 2005, 2007, 2008, 2009, 2010, 2011, 2012, 2013, 2014. 2015, 2016, 2017, 2018)	Winners (2010)
Villanova	No. 28 RPI	November 15, 2021	At-large	1 (2016)	First round (2016)
St. John's	No. 29 RPI	November 15, 2021	At-large	21 (1992, 1993, 1994, 1995, 1996, 1997, 1998, 1999, 2000, 2001, 2002, 2003, 2004, 2005, 2006, 2008, 2009, 2011, 2012, 2013, 2019)	Winners (1996)
Portland	No. 32 RPI	November 15, 2021	At-large	16 (1988, 1989, 1990, 1991, 1992, 1993, 1995, 1999, 2001, 2002, 2003, 2004, 2007, 2009, 2016, 2018)	Semifinals (1988, 1995)
Louisville	No. 33 RPI	November 15, 2021	At-large	12 (2007, 2008, 2009, 2010, 2011, 2012, 2013, 2014, 2016, 2017, 2018, 2019)	Runners-up (2010)
Wake Forest	No. 34 RPI	November 15, 2021	At-large	24 (1988, 1989, 1990, 1991, 1999, 2001, 2002, 2003, 2004, 2005, 2006, 2007, 2008, 2009, 2011, 2012, 2013, 2014, 2015, 2016, 2017, 2018, 2019, 2020)	Winners (2007)
Charlotte	No. 35 RPI	November 15, 2021	At-large	15 (1991, 1992, 1994, 1996, 1997, 2009, 2011, 2012, 2013, 2014, 2015, 2016, 2018, 2019, 2020)	Runners-up (2011)
Georgia State	No. 36 RPI	November 15, 2021	At-large	2 (2011, 2018)	First round (2011, 2018)
Bowling Green	No. 49 RPI	November 15, 2021	At-large	7 (1972, 1973, 1992, 1995, 1996, 1997, 2020)	Round of 16 (1972, 1973, 1996, 1997)

=== Seeded teams ===
Seeded teams
Seed	School	Conference	Record	Berth type	United Soccer Coaches ranking	RPI ranking
1	Oregon State	7–1–2	12–2–3	Automatic	1st	2nd
2	Washington	6–1–2	14–1–2	At-Large	3rd	1st
3	Georgetown	8–2–0	16–2–0	Automatic	7th	3rd
4	Notre Dame	4–2–2	12–5–3	Automatic	20th	5th
5	Pittsburgh	5–2–1	11–5–1	At-Large	5th	7th
6	Tulsa	8–1–1	15–1–1	Automatic	2nd	6th
7	Duke	5–2–1	13–4–1	At-Large	11th	4th
8	Clemson	5–3–0	13–5–0	At-Large	9th	9th
9	Kentucky	3–1–4	14–1–4	Automatic	15th	8th
10	Saint Louis	8–0–0	14–0–4	Automatic	8th	14th
11	West Virginia	4–1–1	11–2–4	At-Large	21st	19th
12	Penn State	6–2–0	13–6–1	Automatic	24th	21st
13	FIU	7–0–1	12–3–2	At-Large	14th	18th
14	Marshall	5–1–2	11–3–3	At-Large	4th	17th
15	Indiana	5–3–0	14–5–1	At-Large	17th	13th
16	New Hampshire	7–0–1	16–1–2	At-Large	6th	11th

== Bracket ==
The bracket was announced on Monday, November 15, 2021. First round games will be played on November 18 at campus sites.

=== Regional 1 ===
First Round; November 18, 2021
St. John's*	1
Princeton	0
North Carolina* (pen.)	0 (4)
Loyola (MD)	0 (2)
Akron*	1
Santa Clara (a.e.t.)	2
Grand Canyon*	0
Denver	1

Second Round; November 21, 2021
1	Oregon State*	2
St. John's	0
North Carolina	1
16	New Hampshire*	4
9	Kentucky*	2
Santa Clara	0
Denver	0
8	Clemson* (a.e.t.)	1

Third Round; November 27–28, 2021
1	Oregon State*	1
16	New Hampshire	0
9	Kentucky	1
8	Clemson*	2

Quarterfinals; December 3–4, 2021
1	Oregon State*	1 (3)
8	Clemson (pen.)	1 (4)

Host Institution*

=== Regional 2 ===
First Round; November 18, 2021
Northern Illinois*	2
Oakland	1
Hofstra*	4
Lipscomb	2
Wake Forest*	2
Mercer	1
Vermont*	0
Villanova	1

Second Round; November 21, 2021
5	Pittsburgh*	5
Northern Illinois	2
Hofstra	8
12	Penn State*	2
13	FIU*	2
Wake Forest	3
Villanova	0
4	Notre Dame*	3

Third Round; November 27–28, 2021
5	Pittsburgh*	4
Hofstra	0
Wake Forest	0
4	Notre Dame*	2

Quarterfinals; December 3–4, 2021
5	Pittsburgh	1 (2)
4	Notre Dame* (pen.)	1 (4)

Host Institution*

=== Regional 3 ===
First Round; November 18, 2021
Charlotte*	0
Georgia State	1
Providence*	2
Marist	0
Virginia Tech*	2
Campbell	1
Missouri State*	0
Creighton	1

Second Round; November 21, 2021
3	Georgetown*	2
Georgia State	0
Providence (a.e.t.)	2
14	Marshall*	1
11	West Virginia* (pen.)	1 (4)
Virginia Tech	1 (3)
Creighton	0
6	Tulsa*	1

Third Round; November 27–28, 2021
3	Georgetown*	4
Providence	1
11	West Virginia (a.e.t.)	1
6	Tulsa*	0

Quarterfinals; December 3–4, 2021
3	Georgetown* (pen.)	1 (4)
11	West Virginia	1 (1)

Host Institution*

=== Regional 4 ===
First Round; November 18, 2021
UCLA* (a.e.t.)	2
UC Santa Barbara	1
Maryland*	0
LIU	1
Louisville*	0
Bowling Green	1
Portland*	3
Seattle	2

Second Round; November 21, 2021
7	Duke*	2
UCLA	1
LIU	1
10	Saint Louis*	5
15	Indiana*	2
Bowling Green	0
Portland	1
2	Washington*	3

Third Round; November 27–28, 2021
7	Duke*	3
10	Saint Louis	4
15	Indiana	2
2	Washington* (a.e.t.)	3

Quarterfinals; December 3–4, 2021
10	Saint Louis	0
2	Washington*	2

Host Institution*

=== 2021 College Cup ===
Semifinals; December 10; WakeMed Soccer Park; Cary, North Carolina
8	Clemson (pen.)	1 (5)
4	Notre Dame	1 (3)
3	Georgetown	1
2	Washington	2

Championship; December 12 @ 2:00pm EST; WakeMed Soccer Park; Cary, North Carolina
8	Clemson	2
2	Washington	0

== Results ==
=== First round ===
November 18, 2021	St. John's	1–0	Princeton	New York, NY
5:00 p.m. EST	Brandon Knapp 43'	Report		Stadium: Belson Stadium; Attendance: 933; Referee: Thomas Snyder

November 18, 2021	Maryland	0–1	LIU	College Park, MD
6:00 p.m. EST	Chris Rindov (yellow card) 87'	Report	(yellow card) 50' Fridtjof Andberg; (yellow card) 63' Alan Martinez; (yellow card) 81' Matthias Heiland; (yellow card) 89', (goal) 89' Assane Ben Fall	Stadium: Ludwig Field; Attendance: 1,070; Referee: Joshua Encarnacion

November 18, 2021	North Carolina	0–0 (a.e.t.) (4–2 p)	Loyola (MD)	Chapel Hill, NC
6:00 p.m. EST	Milo Garvanian (yellow card) 44'; Tim Schels (yellow card) 85'	Report	(yellow card) 29' Jonathan Sousa; (yellow card) 49' Sam Brown; (yellow card) 72' Justin Ingram; (yellow card) 90' Jordy Luchies	Stadium: Dorrance Field; Attendance: 1,347; Referee: Karl Kummer
	Penalties
	Santiago Herrera (penalty scored); Alex Rose (penalty scored); Milo Garvanian (penalty scored); Filippo Zattarin (penalty scored)		(penalty missed) Justin Ingram; (penalty missed) Kelan Swales; (penalty scored) Daniel Tshiani; (penalty scored) Jordy Luchies

November 18, 2021	Vermont	0–1	Villanova	Burlington, VT
6:00 p.m. EST	Zach Barrett (yellow card) 18'; Noah Egan (yellow card) 40'	Report	28' (pen.) Lyam MacKinnon; (yellow card) 63' Dominic Cyriacks	Stadium: Virtue Field; Attendance: 1,497; Referee: Jeremy Scheer

November 18, 2021	Virginia Tech	2–1	Campbell	Blacksburg, VA
6:00 p.m. EST	Kyle McDowell 41'; Kahlil Dover 72'	Report	56' Daniel Hernandez	Stadium: Thompson Field; Attendance: 369; Referee: Sergio Gonzalez

November 18, 2021	Wake Forest	2–1	Mercer	Winston-Salem, NC
6:00 p.m. EST	Kyle Holcomb 18', 66'	Report	11' Dylan Gaither	Stadium: Spry Stadium; Attendance: 855; Referee: Mike Stutt

November 18, 2021	Missouri State	0–1	Creighton	Springfield, MO
5:00 p.m. CST		Report	(yellow card) 30' Charles Auguste; 78' Diego Gutierrez	Stadium: Betty & Bobby Allison South Stadium; Attendance: 920; Referee: Matthew Rodman

November 18, 2021	Louisville	0–1	Bowling Green	Louisville, KY
6:30 p.m. EST	Josh Jones (yellow card) 69'; Dante Huckaby (yellow card) 88'	Report	30' Kale Nichols; (yellow card) 74' Jacob Erlandson; (yellow card) 86' Zach Buescher	Stadium: Lynn Stadium; Attendance: 672; Referee: Austin Saini

November 18, 2021	Akron	1–2 (a.e.t.)	Santa Clara	Akron, OH
7:00 p.m. EST	Carlo Ritaccio 26', (yellow card) 42'	Report	46', (yellow card) 89' Tyrone Kirunda; 102' Eduardo Lopez Perez	Stadium: FirstEnergy Stadium–Cub Cadet Field; Attendance: 982; Referee: Eric Tattersall

November 18, 2021	Charlotte	0–1	Georgia State	Charlotte, NC
7:00 p.m. EST	Delasi Batse (yellow card) 55' (yellow-red card) 90'; Preston Popp (yellow card) 89'; Carson Price (red card) 90'	Report	(yellow card) 6' Logan Luque; 26', (yellow card) 45' George Proctor	Stadium: Transamerica Field; Attendance: 1,100; Referee: Marc Lawrence

November 18, 2021	Hofstra	4–2	Lipscomb	Hempstead, NY
7:00 p.m. EST	Pierce Infuso 16'; Hendrik Hebbeker 50', (yellow card) 89'; Ryan Carmichael 52'; Matthew Vowinkel 54'; Joe Wright (yellow card) 75'	Report	14' Hayes Wood; (yellow card) 23' Louis Robinson; 26', (yellow card) 53' Bakary Bagayoko	Stadium: Shuart Stadium; Attendance: 987; Referee: Randall Kelley

November 18, 2021	Providence	2–0	Marist	Providence, RI
7:00 p.m. EST	Christopher Roman 40'; Armaan Wilson 67'	Report	(yellow card) 52' Henrique Cruz	Stadium: Anderson Stadium; Attendance: 1,404; Referee: Carlos Fernandes

November 18, 2021	Northern Illinois	2–1	Oakland	DeKalb, IL
6:00 p.m. CST	Diego Maynez 4', 14'; Roque Viegas (yellow card) 68'	Report	(yellow card) 11' Cameron Wilde; (yellow card) 63' Kieran Hayes; 70' Noah Jensen; (red card) 86' Dawson Schrum; (yellow card) 88' Owen Smith; (yellow card) 90' Adam McAleenan; (red card) 90' Team	Stadium: NIU Soccer Complex; Attendance: 308; Referee: Nikola Aleksic

November 18, 2021	Grand Canyon	0–1	Denver	Phoenix, AZ
7:00 p.m. MST	Marios Andreou (yellow card) 86' (yellow-red card) 90'	Report	24' Kengo Ohira	Stadium: GCU Stadium; Attendance: 3,124; Referee: Robi Hullner

November 18, 2021	Portland	3–2	Seattle	Portland, OR
7:00 p.m. PST	Alejandro Pereira 27', 30'; Wesley Frankel 63'	Report	24' Noe Meza; (yellow card) 70' Sam Tessler; (yellow card) 78' Hai Uderitz; 80' Levonte Johnson	Stadium: Merlo Field; Attendance: 1,129; Referee: Corbyn May

November 18, 2021	UCLA	2–1 (a.e.t.)	UC Santa Barbara	Los Angeles, CA
7:00 p.m. PST	Aaron Edwards (yellow card) 68'; Jose Contell 86'; Kevin Diaz 103'	Report	Ramses Martinez 54'	Stadium: Wallis Annenberg Stadium; Attendance: 1396; Referee: Alex Del Engel; Assistant referees: Robert Vincze; Jared Kennedy; Fourth official: Arnold Baldeaux

=== Second round ===
November 21, 2021	(3) Georgetown	2–0	Georgia State	Washington, DC
11:00 AM EST	Dante Polvara 70' (pen.); Zach Riviere 83'	Report	(yellow card) 52' Iolo Jones; (yellow card) 90' Simon Carlson	Stadium: Shaw Field; Attendance: 1,091; Referee: Karl Kummer

November 21, 2021	(7) Duke	2–1	UCLA	Durham, NC
1:00 PM EST	Ruben Mesalles 87'; Peter Stroud 88'	Report	Yoni Sorokin (yellow card) 7' (yellow-red card) 34'; Jose Sosa 9'; Kevin Diaz (yellow card) 37'; Pietro Grassi (red card) 89'	Stadium: Koskinen Stadium; Attendance: 626; Referee: Carmen Serbio

November 21, 2021	(11) West Virginia	1–1 (a.e.t.) (4–3 p)	Virginia Tech	Morgantown, WV
1:00 PM EST	Ike Swiger 7'; Aaron Denk Gracia (yellow card) 90'	Report	56', (yellow card) 60' Jacob Labovitz; (yellow card) 71' Sivert Haugli; (yellow card) 86' Kyle McDowell; (yellow card) 89' Conor Pugh; (yellow card) 100' Andrew Weber; (yellow card) 109' Danny Flores	Stadium: Dlesk Stadium; Attendance: 1,017; Referee: Sorin Stoica
	Penalties
	Ryan Crooks (penalty scored); Dyon Dromers (penalty scored); Bjarne Thiesen (penalty missed); Otto Ollikainen (penalty scored); Pau Jimenez (penalty scored)		(penalty scored) Sivert Haugli; (penalty scored) Pol Monells; (penalty missed) Jacob Labovitz; (penalty missed) Daniel Starr; (penalty scored) Danny Flores

November 21, 2021	(14) Marshall	1–2 (a.e.t.)	Providence	Huntington, WV
1:00 PM EST	Alexander Adjetey 56'; Collin Mocyunas (yellow card) 56'; Nathan Dossantos (yellow card) 101'	Report	(yellow card) 25' Paulo Lima; (yellow card) 51' Malcolm Duncan; (yellow card) 53' Christopher Roman; 85' Miguel Candela; 104' Davis Smith	Stadium: Veterans Memorial Soccer Complex; Attendance: 1,319; Referee: Aaron Hernandez

November 21, 2021	(15) Indiana	2–0	Bowling Green	Bloomington, IN
2:00 PM EST	Victor Bezerra 47'; Joe Schmidt (yellow card) 56'; Spencer Glass 61'	Report	(yellow card) 47' Kale Nichols	Stadium: Bill Armstrong Stadium; Attendance: 544; Referee: Eric Tattersall

November 21, 2021	(16) New Hampshire	4–1	North Carolina	Durham, NH
2:00 PM EST	Bridger Hansen 23'; Rory O'Driscoll 37'; Jacob Gould 40'; Johann von Knebel 45'	Report	24', (yellow card) 62' Tim Schels; (yellow card) 34' Jonathan Jimenez	Stadium: Wildcat Stadium; Attendance: 3,264; Referee: Jan Halaska

November 21, 2021	(10) Saint Louis	5–1	LIU	St. Louis, MO
3:00 PM EST	John Klein 4', 15', (yellow card) 23'; Christian Buendia 21'; Simon Becher 47'; A. J. Palazzolo 70'	Report	23' Robert Winkler; (yellow card) 23' (yellow-red card) 64' Emil Jaaskelainen	Stadium: Hermann Stadium; Attendance: 6,815; Referee: Heber Estrada

November 21, 2021	(5) Pittsburgh	5–2	Northern Illinois	Pittsburgh, PA
4:00 PM EST	Guilherme Feitosa 6'; Bertin Jacquesson 30'; Jackson Walti 45'; Valentin Noël (yellow card) 53'; Filip Mirkovic (yellow card) 63'; Alexander Dexter 74'	Report	5' Anthony Markanich; 47', (yellow card) 60' Roque Viegas Jr.	Stadium: Ambrose Urbanic Field; Attendance: 881; Referee: Sergio Gonzalez

November 21, 2021	(4) Notre Dame	3–0	Villanova	South Bend, IN
5:00 PM EST	Jack Lynn 18'; Paddy Burns 36'; Daniel Russo (yellow card) 47'; Ethan O'Brien (yellow card) 59'; Ben Giacobello 85'	Report	(yellow card) 44' (yellow-red card) 83' Anthony Dragisics; (yellow card) 86' Luke Pompliano	Stadium: Alumni Stadium; Attendance: 891

November 21, 2021	(12) Penn State	2–8	Hofstra	State College, PA
5:00 PM EST	Tyger Evans (yellow card) 33'; Femi Awodesu 78'; Daniel Bloyou 89'	Report	3' Ryan Carmichael; 30', 63' Hendrik Hebbeker; 37' Matthew Vowinkel; 46' Francesco Perinelli; 56', 62' Roc Carles; 68' Holger Maaloe	Stadium: Jeffrey Field; Attendance: 387; Referee: Lucas Feathers

November 21, 2021	(13) FIU	2–3	Wake Forest	Miami, FL
6:00 PM EST	Mauro Bravo 39'; Matteo Gasperoni 63', (yellow card) 79'	Report	(yellow card) 13' Holland Rula; 27' Kyle Holcomb; 42' Chase Oliver; 64' Roald Mitchell; (yellow card) 68' Jahlane Forbes	Stadium: FIU Soccer Stadium; Attendance: 1,567; Referee: Diana Padilla

November 21, 2021	(9) Kentucky	2–0	Santa Clara	Lexington, KY
7:00 PM EST	Lucca Rodrigues 5'; Marcel Meinzer 9'; Daniel Evans (yellow card) 76'	Report		Stadium: Bell Soccer Complex; Attendance: 1,049; Referee: Nicholas Balcer

November 21, 2021	(6) Tulsa	1–0	Creighton	Tulsa, OK
7:00 PM EST	Mitchell Cashion 40'	Report	(yellow card) 20' Musa Qongo	Stadium: Hurricane Soccer & Track Stadium; Attendance: 924; Referee: Brandon Gardner

November 21, 2021	(8) Clemson	1–0 (a.e.t.)	Denver	Clemson, SC
7:00 PM EST	Callum Johnson (yellow card) 57'; Charlie Asensio (yellow card) 99'; Oskar Ågren 108' (pen.)	Report	(yellow card) 22' Stefan DeLeone; (yellow card) 37' Eli Mereness; (yellow card) 38' (yellow-red card) 111' Liam Johnson	Stadium: Riggs Field; Attendance: 1,849; Referee: Mike Stutt

November 21, 2021	(2) Washington	3–1	Portland	Seattle, WA
8:00 PM EST	Lucas Meek (yellow card) 40'; Dylan Teves 45', 80', 88'	Report	(yellow card) 68' Alejandro Pereira; (yellow card) 70' Kevin Bonilla; 81' Luke Hendel; (yellow card) 81' John Atem Kato	Stadium: Husky Soccer Stadium; Attendance: 2,354; Referee: Will Niccolls

November 21, 2021	(1) Oregon State	2–0	St. John's	Corvallis, OR
9:00 PM EST	Mouhameth Thiam 11'; Gael Gilbert (yellow card) 69'; Javier Armas 85'	Report	(yellow card) 80' Rafael Bustamante	Stadium: Lorenz Field; Attendance: 1,182; Referee: Josh Wilkens

=== Third round ===
November 27, 2021	(2) Washington	3–2 (a.e.t.)	(15) Indiana	Seattle, WA
3:00 PM EST	Dylan Teves 48' (pen.), 75' 97'; Kendall Burks (yellow card) 85'	Report	29' Victor Bezerra; 52' Spencer Glass	Stadium: Husky Soccer Stadium; Attendance: 2,200; Referee: Josh Wilkens

November 27, 2021	(5) Pittsburgh	4–0	Hofstra	Pittsburgh, PA
5:00 PM EST	Arturo Ordonez (yellow card) 35'; Filip Mirkovic 40'; Raphael Crivello 49', 68'; Bertin Jacquesson 63'	Report	(yellow card) 72' Roc Carles; (yellow card) 77' Storm Strongin; (yellow card) 79' George O'Malley	Stadium: Urbanic Field; Attendance: 1079; Referee: Eric Tattersall

November 27, 2021	(7) Duke	3–4	(10) Saint Louis	Durham, NC
7:00 PM EST	Thorleifur Ulfarsson 54'; Nick Pariano 74'; Jai Bean 77', (red card) 90'	Report	18' Mason Leeth; (yellow card) 57' Christian Buendia; 58' John Klein; 64' Simon Becher; (yellow card) 76' Kevin Komodi; 79' (o.g.) Own Goal	Stadium: Koskinen Stadium; Attendance: 714; Referee: Sorin Stoica

November 27, 2021	(6) Tulsa	0–1	(11) West Virginia	Tulsa, OK
8:00 PM EST		Report	(yellow card) 100' Yoran Popovic; 102' Otto Ollikainen	Stadium: Hurricane Soccer & Track Stadium; Attendance: 762; Referee: Daniel Radford

November 28, 2021	(3) Georgetown	4–1	Providence	Washington, DC
12:00 PM EST	Dante Polvara 36'; Marlon Tabora 53', 58', 64'	Report	(yellow card) 41' Armaan Wilson; (yellow card) 45' Paulo Lima; (yellow card) 79' Ramzi Qawasmy; 88' Brendan McSorley	Stadium: Shaw Field; Attendance: 2,145; Referee: Joshua Encarnacion

November 28, 2021	(4) Notre Dame	2–0	Wake Forest	South Bend, IN
5:00 PM EST	Mohamed Omar 19', (yellow card) 64'; Matthew Roou 57'	Report	(yellow card) 65' Babacar Niang; (yellow card) 70' Kyle Holcomb	Stadium: Alumni Stadium; Attendance: 359

November 28, 2021	(8) Clemson	2–1	(9) Kentucky	Clemson, SC
7:00 PM EST	Callum Johnson 14'; Hamady Diop (yellow card) 34'; Isaiah Reid (yellow card) 65'; Ousmane Sylla (yellow card) 85'; Alvaro Gomez 89'	Report	(yellow card) 45' Luis Graasow; 85' Lucca Rodrigues; (yellow card) 86' Team	Stadium: Riggs Field; Attendance: 1,793; Referee: Matthew Thompson

November 28, 2021	(1) Oregon State	1–0	(16) New Hampshire	Corvallis, OR
9:00 PM EST	Mouhameth Thiam 10', (yellow card) 88'	Report	(yellow card) 41' Yannick Bright; (yellow card) 70' Bridger Hansen	Stadium: Paul Lorenz Field; Attendance: 1,265; Referee: Will Niccolls

=== Quarterfinals ===
December 4, 2021	(3) Georgetown	1–1 (a.e.t.) (4–1 p)	(11) West Virginia	Washington, DC
12:00 PM EST	Chris Hegardt (yellow card) 61'; Dante Polvara 67'	Report	16', (yellow card) 101' Yoran Popovic; (yellow card) 85' Kevin Morris	Stadium: Shaw Field; Attendance: 3,027; Referee: Nicholas Balcer
	Penalties
	Stefan Stojanović (penalty scored); Zach Riviere (penalty scored); Aidan Rocha (penalty scored); Joe Buck (penalty scored)		(penalty missed) Ryan Crooks; (penalty scored) Yoran Popovic; (penalty missed) Ike Swiger

December 4, 2021	(4) Notre Dame	1–1 (a.e.t.) (4–2 p)	(5) Pittsburgh	South Bend, IN
5:00 PM EST	Matt Bailey (yellow card) 51'; Paddy Burns 67'	Report	41' Guilherme Feitosa; (yellow card) 103' Thomas Deslongchamps	Stadium: Alumni Stadium; Attendance: 1,303; Referee: Sorin Stoica
	Penalties
	Jack Lynn (penalty scored); Paddy Burns (penalty scored); Dawson McCartney (penalty scored); Philip Quinton (penalty scored)		(penalty scored) Valentin Noël; (penalty scored) Guilherme Feitosa; (penalty missed) Filip Mirkovic; (penalty missed) Alexander Dexter

December 4, 2021	(2) Washington	2–0	(10) Saint Louis	Seattle, WA
8:00 PM EST	Gio Miglietti 22', 26'; Kendall Burks (yellow card) 50'; Sam Fowler (yellow card) 87'	Report		Stadium: Husky Soccer Stadium; Attendance: 3,629; Referee: Alex de Angel

December 4, 2021	(1) Oregon State	1–1 (a.e.t.) (3–4 p)	(8) Clemson	Corvallis, OR
9:00 PM EST	Sofiane Djeffal 30', (yellow card) 84'; Mouhameth Thiam (yellow card) 33'; Nicklas Lund (yellow card) 41'; Tsiki Ntsabeleng (yellow card) 104'	Report	(yellow card) 30' George Marks; (yellow card) 44' Charlie Asensio; (yellow card) 67' Ousmane Sylla; 85' (pen.) Luis Felipe Fernandez-Salvador	Stadium: Paul Lorenz Field; Attendance: 1,415; Referee: William Hoffman
	Penalties
	Sofiane Djeffal (penalty scored); Javier Armas (penalty missed); Gael Gilbert (penalty scored); Niklas Lund (penalty scored); Tsiki Ntsabeleng (penalty missed)		(penalty scored) Hamady Diop; (penalty scored) Justin Malou; (penalty scored) Oskar Ågren; (penalty scored) Isaiah Reid

=== College Cup Semifinals ===
December 10, 2021	(4) Notre Dame	1–1 (a.e.t.) (4–5 p)	(8) Clemson	Cary, NC
6:00 p.m. EST	Jack Lynn 21' (pen.); Dawson McCartney (yellow card) 95'	Report	11' Luis Felipe Fernandez-Salvador; (yellow card) 105' Mohamed Seye	Stadium: WakeMed Soccer Park; Referee: Nikola Aleksic; Assistant referees: Seth Barton; Salma Perez; Fourth official: Daniel Radford
	Penalties
	Jack Lynn (penalty scored); Paddy Burns (penalty scored); Dawson McCartney (penalty scored); Philip Quinton (penalty missed)		(penalty scored) John Martin; (penalty scored) Luis Felipe Fernandez-Salvador; (penalty scored) Oskar Ågren; (penalty scored) Hamady Diop; (penalty scored) Justin Malou

December 10, 2021	(2) Washington	2–1	(3) Georgetown	Cary, NC
8:30 p.m. EST	Lucas Meek 54', (yellow card) 62'; Charlie Ostrem 57'; Nick Scardina (yellow card) 57'; Team (yellow card) 90'	Report	(yellow card) 55' Dante Polvara; 80' Zach Riviere	Stadium: WakeMed Soccer Park; Attendance: 10,132; Referee: Matt Thompson; Assistant referees: Art Arustamyan; Meghan Mullen; Fourth official: Daniel Radford

=== College Cup Final ===
December 12, 2021	(2) Washington	0–2	(8) Clemson	Cary, NC
2:00 PM EST	Ryan Sailor (yellow card) 84'; Charlie Ostrem (yellow card) 89'	Report	1', 15' Isaiah Reid; (yellow card) 8' Charlie Asensio; (yellow card) 82' Elton Chifamba; (yellow card) 86' Brandon Parrish	Stadium: WakeMed Soccer Park; Attendance: 7,238; Referee: Daniel Radford; Assistant referees: Meghan Mullen; Ryan Graves; Fourth official: Nikola Aleksic

== Records by conference ==
Conference	Bids	Record	Pct.	R32	R16	E8	F4	CG	NC
ACC	8	11–4–5	.659	7	5	3	2	1	1
Big East	5	7–5–1	.577	5	2	1	1	–	–
Pac-12	3	7–2–1	.750	3	2	2	1	1	–
Atlantic 10	1	2–1–0	.667	1	1	1	–	–	–
MAC	5	4–5–1	.450	4	1	1	–	–	–
America East	2	1–2–0	.333	1	1	–	–	–	–
American	1	1–1–0	.500	1	1	–	–	–	–
Big Ten	3	1–3–0	.250	2	1	–	–	–	–
CAA	1	2–1–0	.667	1	1	–	–	–	–
C-USA	4	1–4–0	.200	3	1	–	–	–	–
WCC	2	2–2–0	.500	2	–	–	–	–	–
NEC	1	1–1–0	.500	1	–	–	–	–	–
Summit	1	1–1–0	.500	1	–	–	–	–	–
10 Others	11	0–10–1	.045	–	–	–	–	–	–

- The R32, S16, E8, F4, CG, and NC columns indicate how many teams from each conference were in the Round of 32 (second round), Round of 16 (third round), Quarterfinals (Elite Eight), Semifinals (Final Four), Championship Game, and National Champion, respectively.
- The following conferences failed to place a team into the round of 32: ASUN, Big South, Big West, Horizon, Ivy League, MAAC, MVC, Patriot, SoCon, WAC. The conference's records have been consolidated in the other row.

== Statistics ==
=== Goalscorers ===
There were 135 goals scored in 47 matches, for an average of 2.87 goals per match (as of December 12, 2021).

6 goals

- (United States) Dylan Teves – Washington

3 goals

- (Honduras) Marlon Tabora – Georgetown
- (United States) Dante Polvara – Georgetown
- (Germany) Hendrik Hebbeker – Hofstra
- (United States) John Klein – Saint Louis
- (United States) Kyle Holcomb – Wake Forest

2 goals

- (Ecuador) Luis Felipe Fernandez-Salvador – Clemson
- (United States) Isaiah Reid – Clemson
- (United States) Zach Riviere – Georgetown
- (Spain) Roc Carles – Hofstra
- (Northern Ireland) Ryan Carmichael – Hofstra
- (United States) Matthew Vowinkel – Hofstra
- (United States) Victor Bezerra – Indiana
- (United States) Spencer Glass – Indiana
- (Brazil) Lucca Rodrigues – Kentucky
- (United States) Diego Maynez – Northern Illinois
- (Northern Ireland) Paddy Burns – Notre Dame
- (United States) Jack Lynn – Notre Dame
- (Senegal) Mouhameth Thiam – Oregon State
- (France) Raphael Crivello – Pittsburgh
- (France) Bertin Jacquesson – Pittsburgh
- (Brazil) Guilherme Feitosa – Pittsburgh
- (Puerto Rico) Alejandro Pereira – Portland
- (United States) Simon Becher – Saint Louis
- (United States) Gio Miglietti – Washington

1 goal

- (United States) Carlo Ritaccio – Akron
- (United States) Kale Nichols – Bowling Green
- (Colombia) Daniel Hernandez – Campbell
- (Sweden) Oskar Ågren – Clemson
- (United States) Callum Johnson – Clemson
- (Spain) Alvaro Gomez – Clemson
- (United States) Diego Gutierrez – Creighton
- (Japan) Kengo Ohira – Denver
- (United States) Ruben Mesalles – Duke
- (United States) Peter Stroud – Duke
- (Iceland) Thorleifur Úlfarsson – Duke
- (United States) Nick Pariano – Duke
- (Bermuda) Jai Bean – Duke
- (Spain) Mauro Bravo – FIU
- (Italy) Matteo Gasperoni – FIU
- (England) George Proctor – Georgia State
- (United States) Pierce Infuso – Hofstra
- (Denmark) Holger Maaloe – Hofstra
- (Italy) Francesco Perinelli – Hofstra
- (Germany) Marcel Meinzer – Kentucky
- (Guinea) Bakary Bagayoko – Lipscomb
- (United States) Hayes Wood – Lipscomb
- (Senegal) Assane Ben Fall – LIU
- (Germany) Robert Winkler – LIU
- (Ghana) Alexander Adjetey – Marshall
- (United States) Dylan Gaither – Mercer
- (United States) Jacob Gould – New Hampshire
- (United States) Bridger Hansen – New Hampshire
- (United States) Rory O'Driscoll – New Hampshire
- (Germany) Johann von Knebel – New Hampshire
- (Germany) Tim Schels – North Carolina
- (United States) Anthony Markanich – Northern Illinois
- (Brazil) Roque Viegas Jr. – Northern Illinois
- (United States) Ben Giacobello – Notre Dame
- (Somalia) Mohamed Omar – Notre Dame
- (United States) Matthew Roou – Notre Dame
- (Canada) Noah Jensen – Oakland
- (Spain) Javier Armas – Oregon State
- (France) Sofiane Djeffal – Oregon State
- (United States) Femi Awodesu – Penn State
- (Ghana) Daniel Bloyou – Penn State
- (United States) Alexander Dexter – Pittsburgh
- (Switzerland) Jackson Walti – Pittsburgh
- (United States) Filip Mirkovic – Pittsburgh
- (United States) Wesley Frankel – Portland
- (Germany) Luke Hendel – Portland
- (Spain) Miguel Candela – Providence
- (United States) Christopher Roman – Providence
- (United States) Brendan McSorley – Providence
- (United States) Davis Smith – Providence
- (Canada) Armaan Wilson – Providence
- (United States) Brandon Knapp – Saint John's
- (United States) Christian Buendia – Saint Louis
- (United States) A.J. Palazzolo – Saint Louis
- (United States) Mason Leeth – Saint Louis
- (England) Tyrone Kirunda – Santa Clara
- (United States) Eduardo Lopez Perez – Santa Clara
- (Canada) Levonte Johnson – Seattle
- (United States) Noe Meza – Seattle
- (United States) Mitchell Cashion – Tulsa
- (Spain) Jose Contell – UCLA
- (United States) Kevin Diaz – UCLA
- (United States) Jose Sosa – UCLA
- (United States) Ramses Martinez – UC Santa Barbara
- (Switzerland) Lyam MacKinnon – Villanova
- (United States) Kahlil Dover – Virginia Tech
- (United States) Jacob Labovitz – Virginia Tech
- (Northern Ireland) Kyle McDowell – Virginia Tech
- (Trinidad and Tobago) Roald Mitchell – Wake Forest
- (United States) Chase Oliver – Wake Forest
- (United States) Charlie Ostrem – Washington
- (United States) Lucas Meek – Washington
- (United States) Ike Swiger – West Virginia
- (Netherlands) Yoran Popovic – West Virginia
- (Finland) Otto Ollikainen – West Virginia

== Honors ==
=== College Cup All-Tournament team ===
Goalkeeper	Defenders	Midfielders	Forwards	Ref
(United States) George Marks (Clemson)	(Sweden) Oskar Ågren (Clemson) (Senegal) Justin Malou (Clemson) (United States) Charlie Ostrem (Washington) (United States) Ryan Sailor (Washington)	(Ecuador) Luis Fernandez-Salvador (Clemson) (United States) Lucas Meek (Washington) (United States) Dylan Teves (Washington) (United States) Zach Riviere (Georgetown)	(United States) Jack Lynn (Notre Dame) (United States) Isaiah Reid (Clemson)	

== See also ==
- 2021 NCAA Division I Women's Soccer Tournament
