= 2021 Patriot League men's soccer tournament =

- Classification: Division I
- Teams: 6
- Matches: 5
- Attendance: 2,777
- Site: Campus Sites, Higher seed
- Champions: Loyola (MD) (1st title)
- Winning coach: Steve Nichols (1st title)
- MVP: Chase Vosvick (Loyola (MD))
- Broadcast: ESPN+

2021 Patriot League men's soccer standings
	Conf.					Overall
Team	W		L		T	W		L		T
Loyola (MD) ‡	7	–	2	–	0	10	–	6	–	4
American	6	–	2	–	1	9	–	5	–	4
Holy Cross	5	–	3	–	1	8	–	8	–	3
Lehigh	5	–	4	–	0	5	–	11	–	2
Navy	5	–	4	–	0	12	–	6	–	1
Army	4	–	4	–	1	8	–	7	–	3
Lafayette	3	–	3	–	3	7	–	7	–	4
Boston University	3	–	4	–	2	4	–	9	–	3
Bucknell	2	–	5	–	2	4	–	10	–	3
Colgate	0	–	9	–	0	0	–	18	–	0
‡ – 2021 Patriot Tournament Champion + – At-large invitation to the 2021 NCAA tournament; As of December 14, 2021; Rankings from United Soccer Coaches; Source: Patriot League

The 2021 Patriot League men's soccer tournament was the postseason men's soccer tournament for the Patriot League held from November 6 through November 13, 2021. The tournament was held at campus sites, with the higher seeded team hosting. The six-team single-elimination tournament consisted of three rounds based on seeding from regular season conference play. The defending champions were the American Eagles. They were unable to defend their crown, after losing to Loyola (MD) in the Final. The conference championship was the first for the Loyla men's soccer program, and the first for head coach Steve Nichols. As tournament champions, Loyola earned the Patriot League's automatic berth into the 2021 NCAA Division I men's soccer tournament.

== Seeding ==
Six of the ten Patriot League men's soccer programs qualified for the 2021 Tournament. Teams were seeded based on their regular season records. Tiebreakers were used to determine the seedings of teams who finished with identical conference records. A tiebreaker was required to determine the fourth and fifth seeds for the tournament as Lehigh and Navy finished with identical 5–4–0 records. Lehigh earned the fourth seed by virtue of their 3–2 overtime victory over Navy on October 23. Navy was the fifth seed for the tournament.

Seed	School	Conference Record	Points
1	Loyola (MD)	7–2–0	21
2	American	6–2–1	19
3	Holy Cross	5–3–1	16
4	Lehigh	5–4–0	15
5	Navy	5–4–0	15
6	Army	4–4–1	13

== Bracket ==
Quarterfinals; Saturday, Nov. 6
4	Lehigh	0
5	Navy	1
3	Holy Cross	0
6	Army	1

Semifinals; Tuesday, Nov. 9
1	Loyola (MD) (pen.)	0 (7)
6	Army	0 (6)
2	American	4
5	Navy	2

Final; Sunday, Nov. 13
1	Loyola (MD)	2
2	American	1

== Schedule ==
=== Quarterfinals ===
November 6, 2021	#4 Lehigh	0–1	#5 Navy	Bethlehem, PA
6:00 p.m. ET	Andrew White (yellow card) 32'	Report	50' Charlie Kriel	Stadium: Ulrich Sports Complex; Attendance: 463; Referee: Jorge Ramirez; Assistant referees: Fahrudin Sejdic; Paul Bento; Fourth official: Edwin Shafer

November 6, 2021	#3 Holy Cross	0–1	#6 Army	Worcester, MA
6:00 p.m. ET		Report	71' Oscar Pereira	Stadium: Smith Stadium; Attendance: 322; Referee: Carlos Fernandes; Assistant referees: Sean Regan; Jordan Cavaco; Fourth official: Ruben Seyde

=== Semifinals ===
November 9, 2021	#2 American	4–2	#5 Navy	Washington, D.C.
1:00 p.m. ET	David Coly 12'; Evan Schweickert (yellow card) 32', (goal) 45'; Max Wright 37'; Ethan Boyle 75'	Report	45' (pen.), (yellow card) 55' David Jackson; 59' Jacob Williams; (yellow card) 83' Matt Nocita	Stadium: Reeves Field; Attendance: 365; Referee: Mike De Felice; Assistant referees: Mark Remsa; Nickrod Fateh; Fourth official: Dan Lukash

November 9, 2021	#1 Loyola (MD)	0–0 (a.e.t.) (7–6 p)	#6 Army	Baltimore, MD
7:00 p.m. ET	Kelan Swales (yellow card) 17'; Justin Ingram (yellow card) 73'	Report	(yellow card) 17' Colman Kim; (yellow card) 41' Luke Doyle; (yellow card) 110' Jacob Suppiah	Stadium: Ridley Athletic Complex; Attendance: 511; Referee: Sergio Gonzalez; Assistant referees: Israel Campos; Michael Gorsegner; Fourth official: Balvir Cabrera-Garcia
	Penalties
	Justin Ingram (penalty scored); Kelan Swales (penalty scored); Daniel Tshiani (penalty scored); Jordy Luchies (penalty scored); Matthew Lala (penalty scored); Kevin Medrano (penalty scored); Jacob Denison (penalty scored)		(penalty scored) Oscar Pereira; (penalty scored) John Poncy; (penalty scored) Andrew Guerra; (penalty scored) Colman Kim; (penalty scored) Carter Kowalewski; (penalty scored) Cooper Warren; (penalty missed) Drew Clement

=== Final ===
November 13, 2021	#1 Loyola (MD)	2–1	#2 American	Baltimore, MD
	Kelan Swales 15'; Justin Ingram 83'; Tony Saldana (yellow card) 90'	Report	32', (yellow card) 61' David Coly	Stadium: Ridley Athletic Complex; Attendance: 1,116; Referee: Stephen Foster; Assistant referees: Rob Fereday; Alexander Luttmann; Fourth official: Sharon Gingrich

== Statistics ==
=== Goalscorers ===
There have been 11 goals scored in 5 matches, for an average of 2.2 goals per match (as of November 13, 2021).

2 goals

- David Coly – American

1 goal

- Ethan Boyle – American
- Evan Schweickert – American
- Max Wright – American
- Oscar Pereira – Army
- Justin Ingram – Loyola (MD)
- Kelan Swales – Loyola (MD)
- David Jackson – Navy
- Charlie Kriel – Navy
- Jacob Williams – Navy

== All-Tournament team ==
Player	Team
**Chase Vosvick**	Loyola (MD)
Justin Ingram	Loyola (MD)
Jordy Luchies	Loyola (MD)
Kelan Swales	Loyola (MD)
Nicholas Blassou	American
David Coly	American
Mattias Cooper	American
Oscar Pereira	Army
Jacob Suppiah	Army
Matt Nocita	Navy
Jacob Williams	Navy

MVP in bold
