= 2021 Conference USA men's soccer tournament =

- Classification: Division I
- Teams: 6
- Matches: 5
- Attendance: 1,052
- Site: Transamerica Field; Charlotte, North Carolina
- Champions: Kentucky (2nd title)
- Winning coach: Johan Cedergren (2nd title)
- MVP: Eythor Björgólfsson (Offensive); Luis Grassow (Defensive) (Kentucky)
- Broadcast: ESPN+

2021 Conference USA men's soccer standings
	Conf.					Overall
Team	W		L		T	W		L		T
No. 18 FIU +	7	–	0	–	1	12	–	4	–	2
No. 15 Marshall +	5	–	1	–	2	11	–	4	–	3
Charlotte +	5	–	3	–	0	10	–	6	–	1
No. 11 Kentucky ‡	3	–	1	–	4	15	–	2	–	4
Coastal Carolina	3	–	1	–	4	6	–	5	–	4
Florida Atlantic	2	–	4	–	2	9	–	7	–	3
South Carolina	1	–	5	–	2	5	–	9	–	2
Old Dominion	1	–	5	–	2	3	–	9	–	2
UAB	0	–	7	–	1	2	–	12	–	1
‡ – 2021 C-USA Tournament champion + – At-large invitation to the 2021 NCAA Tournament; As of December 14, 2021; Rankings from United Soccer Coaches; Source: C-USA

The 2021 Conference USA men's soccer tournament, was the 26th edition of the tournament. Conference USA did not conduct a men's soccer tournament after the 2020 season due to the COVID-19 pandemic. The tournament determined Conference USA's automatic berth into the 2021 NCAA Division I men's soccer tournament. The tournament began November 10 and concluded on November 14. The tournament was hosted by University of Charlotte, and all matches were played at the Transamerica Field in Charlotte, North Carolina. This would mark the final C-USA Tournament played as the conference stopped sponsoring men's soccer after the 2021 season when it lost all nine of its members due to conference realignment.

== Seeds ==
The top six teams in C-USA by conference records qualified for the tournament.

Seed	School	Conference	Tiebreaker
1	FIU	7–0–1	
2	Marshall	5–1–2	
3	Charlotte	5–3–0	
4	Kentucky	3–1–4	Conference GD of +7
5	Coastal Carolina	3–1–4	Conference GD of +4
6	FAU	2–4–2	

== Bracket ==
Quarterfinals; November 10
4	Kentucky	3
5	Coastal Carolina	1
3	Charlotte	0 (3)
6	FAU (pen.)	0 (5)

Semifinals; November 12
1	FIU	0
4	Kentucky	3
2	Marshall	1
6	FAU	3

C-USA Championship; November 14
4	Kentucky (a.e.t.)	2
6	FAU	1

== Results ==
=== First round ===
November 10
4:30 PM EST

No. 4 Kentucky	3–1	No. 5 Coastal Carolina
Lucca Rodrigues 2'; Luis Grassow 25'; Eythor Björgólfsson 87'	Report	Alvaro Garcia-Pasqua 67'

Transamerica Field
Referee: Matt Kedlecik

November 10
7:00 PM EST

No. 3 Charlotte	0–0 (a.e.t.)	No. 6 Florida Atlantic
	Report
Penalties
Alessandro Negri (penalty scored); Alex Willis (penalty scored); Joe Britto (penalty missed); Preston Popp (penalty scored)	3–5	Alonso Camarero (penalty scored); Jose Alastuey (penalty scored); Tom Abrahamsson (penalty scored); Filip Jauk (penalty scored); Ivan Mykhailenko (penalty scored)

Transamerica Field
Attendance: 592
Referee: Sorin Stoica

=== Semifinals ===
November 12
4:30 PM EST

No. 1 FIU	0–3	No. 4 Kentucky
	Report	Luke Andrews 54'; Daniel Evans 75', 76'

Transamerica Field
Attendance: 82
Referee: Esteban Rosano

November 12
7:00 PM EST

No. 2 Marshall	1–3	No. 6 Florida Atlantic
Vinicius Fernandes 80'	Report	Tom Abrahamsson 19'; Ivan Mykhailenko 76'; Célestin Theodore, Jr. 81'

Transamerica Field
Attendance: 203
Referee: Jose Rivero

=== Final ===
November 14
1:00 PM EST

No. 4 Kentucky	2–1 (a.e.t.)	No. 6 Florida Atlantic
Marcel Meinzer 60' (pen.); Enzo Mauriz (yellow card) 64'; Eythor Bjorgolfsson 94'	Report	16' Ivan Mykhailenko; (yellow card) 26' Jose Alastuey; (yellow card) 76' Vasilis Spinos

Transamerica Field
Attendance: 175
Referee: Matthew Thompson

== Statistics ==
=== Goalscorers ===
There have been 14 goals scored in 5 matches, for an average of 2.8 goals per match (as of November 14, 2021).

2 goals

- Ivan Mykhailenko – Florida Atlantic
- Eythor Björgólfsson – Kentucky
- Daniel Evans – Kentucky

1 goal

- Alvaro Garcia-Pasqua – Coastal Carolina
- Tom Abrahamsson – Florida Atlantic
- Célestin Theodore, Jr. – Florida Atlantic
- Luke Andrews – Kentucky
- Marcel Meinzer – Kentucky
- Luis Grassow – Kentucky
- Lucca Rodrigues – Kentucky
- Vinicius Fernandes – Marshall

== Awards ==
=== All Tournament XI ===
Player	Team
Eythor Bjorgolfsson*	Kentucky
Luis Grassow^	Kentucky
Jan Hoffelner	Kentucky
Marcel Meinzer	Kentucky
Tom Abrahamsson	Florida Atlantic
Alonso Coello	Florida Atlantic
Ivan Mykhailenko	Florida Atlantic
Matteo Gasperoni	FIU
Kareem Riley	FIU
Alex Adjetey	Marshall
Gabriel Alves	Marshall

* Offensive MVP
^ Defensive MVP
