= 2021 ASUN men's soccer tournament =

- Classification: Division I
- Teams: 6
- Matches: 5
- Attendance: 1,382
- Site: Campus Sites
- Champions: Lipscomb (3rd title)
- Winning coach: Charles Morrow (3rd title)
- MVP: Tyrese Spicer & Hayes Wood (Lipscomb)
- Broadcast: ESPN+

2021 ASUN Conference men's soccer standings
	Conf.					Overall
Team	W		L		T	W		L		T
Lipscomb ‡	5	–	2	–	0	12	–	4	–	2
Central Arkansas	5	–	2	–	0	11	–	6	–	0
Florida Gulf Coast	4	–	3	–	0	4	–	8	–	1
Stetson	4	–	3	–	0	8	–	7	–	2
Liberty	3	–	4	–	0	7	–	9	–	0
Bellarmine ^{#}	2	–	4	–	1	7	–	8	–	2
Jacksonville	2	–	4	–	1	3	–	10	–	1
North Florida	2	–	5	–	0	4	–	8	–	1
‡ – 2021 ASUN Tournament champion + – At-large invitation to the 2021 NCAA Tournament ^{#} – Ineligible for post-season (In transition); As of December 14, 2021; Rankings from United Soccer Coaches; Source: ASUN

The 2021 ASUN men's soccer tournament was the 43rd edition of the postseason men's soccer tournament for the ASUN Conference, held from November 5 through November 13, 2021. All rounds of the tournament were hosted at the first and second seeds home stadiums. The six-team single-elimination tournament consisted of three rounds based on seeding from regular season conference play. The Jacksonville Dolphins were the defending tournament champions, and were unable to defend their title, after not qualifying for the tournament. The Lipscomb Bisons won the tournament after defeating Central Arkansas 4–1 in the final. It was their third title in five years, and third title in program history for Lipscomb and coach Charles Morrow. As tournament champions, Lipscomb earned the ASUN's automatic berth into the 2021 NCAA Division I men's soccer tournament.

== Seeding ==
The top six teams in the regular season earned a spot in the tournament. Teams were seeded based on regular season conference record and tiebreakers were used to determine seedings of teams that finished with the same record. The first tiebreaker was required to determine the first and second overall seeds as Lipscomb and Central Arkansas both finished with 5–2–0 records. Lipscomb defeated Central Arkansas 1–0 on October 30, and was therefore the first seed, while Central Arkansas was the second seed. Florida Gulf Coast and Stetson finished with identical 4–3–0 records, and a tiebreaker was required to determine which team would get the third seed. Florida Gulf Coast defeated Stetson 2–1 on October 30, and earned the third seed, while Stetson was the fourth seed. Bellarmine and defending tournament champions Jacksonville tied for the sixth, and final spot in the tournament, with 2–4–1 records. The two teams drew 0–0 on October 30, and Bellarmine was awarded the sixth and final spot in the tournament.

Seed	School	Conference Record	Points
1	Lipscomb	5–2–0	15
2	Central Arkansas	5–2–0	15
3	Florida Gulf Coast	4–3–0	12
4	Stetson	4–3–0	12
5	Liberty	3–4–0	9
6	Bellarmine	2–4–1	7

== Bracket ==
First round Friday, Nov. 5
4	Stetson	3
5	Liberty	0
3	Florida Gulf Coast	1
6	Bellarmine	2

Semifinals; Sunday, Nov. 7
1	Lipscomb	4
4	Stetson	0
2	Central Arkansas	2
6	Bellarmine	0

Final; Saturday, Nov. 13
1	Lipscomb	4
2	Central Arkansas	1

== Schedule ==
=== First Round ===
November 5, 2021	#3 Florida Gulf Coast	1–2	#6 Bellarmine	Conway, AR
5:00 p.m.	O'Vonte Mullings 60'; Trevin Myers (yellow card) 82'	Report	72' Camden Dunne; 82' Micah Linscott; (yellow card) 85' Juan Ballas	Stadium: Bill Stephens Track/Soccer Complex; Attendance: 50; Referee: Brandon Gardner; Assistant referees: Lawrence Hale; Andrew Ellsworth; Fourth official: Jason Rector

November 5, 2021	#4 Stetson	3–0	#5 Liberty	Nashville, TN
7:00 p.m.	Nelson Pereira 20'; Oliver Bryneus 64'; Ajmeer Spengler 83'	Report		Stadium: Lipscomb Soccer Complex; Attendance: 110; Referee: Andrew Musashe; Assistant referees: Andy Boyle; Daniel Tibbitts; Fourth official: Skyye Medley

=== Semifinals ===
November 7, 2021	#2 Central Arkansas	2–0	#6 Bellarmine	Conway, AR
1:00 p.m.	Jonathan Randall (yellow card) 22'; Ole Kjoerholt (yellow card) 35'; Karim Diao 48', 53'	Report	(yellow card) 5' Jackson Kim; (yellow card) 29' Micah Linscott; (yellow card) 60' Rikard Cederberg; (yellow card) 82' Nate Girao	Stadium: Bill Stephens Track/Soccer Complex; Attendance: 358; Referee: Jervis Atagana; Assistant referees: Matthew Stein; Shane Kennard; Fourth official: David Henderson

November 7, 2021	#1 Lipscomb	4–0	#4 Stetson	Nashville, TN
2:00 p.m.	Tyrese Spicer 54', 73'; Javanne Smith 56'; Burl Shepherd 66'	Report	(red card) 65' Alvaro Gabancho	Stadium: Lipscomb Soccer Complex; Attendance: 302; Referee: Esteban Rosano; Assistant referees: Jackson Krauser; Timothy Stewart; Fourth official: Kris Fabrick

=== Final ===
November 13, 2021	#1 Lipscomb	4–1	#2 Central Arkansas	Nashville, TN
6:00 p.m.	Honore Kalala (yellow card) 2'; Hayes Wood 29', 81'; Bakary Bagayoko 35'; Alejandro Lopez 82'; Luca Naumann (yellow card) 85'	Report	52' (pen.) Alberto Suarez	Stadium: Lipscomb Soccer Complex; Attendance: 562; Referee: Alex Del Angel; Assistant referees: Kyle Johnston; Chjristopher Kloc; Fourth official: Kris Fabick

== Statistics ==
=== Goalscorers ===
There were 17 goals scored in 5 matches, for an average of 3.4 goals per match (as of November 13, 2021).

2 goals

- Karim Diao – Central Arkansas
- Tyrese Spicer – Lipscomb
- Hayes Wood – Lipscomb

1 goal

- Camden Dunne – Bellarmine
- Micah Linscott – Bellarmine
- Alberto Suarez – Central Arkansas
- O'Vonte Mullings – Florida Gulf Coast
- Bakary Bagayoko – Lipscomb
- Alejandro Lopez – Lipscomb
- Burl Shepherd – Lipscomb
- Javanne Smith – Lipscomb
- Oliver Bryneus – Stetson
- Nelson Pereira – Stetson
- Ajmeer Spengler – Stetson

== All-Tournament team ==
Player	Team
**Tyrese Spicer**	Lipscomb
**Hayes Wood**	Lipscomb
Noah Gulden	Lipscomb
Michael Sibley	Lipscomb
Louis Robinson	Lipscomb
Vicent Abaso	Central Arkansas
Karim Diao	Central Arkansas
Alberto Suarez	Central Arkansas
Micah Linscott	Bellarmine
Brock Pope	Bellarmine
O'Vonte Mullings	Florida Gulf Coast
Nelson Pereira	Stetson

MVP in bold
