= Tim Schels =

German footballer

Personal information
- Date of birth: 28 December 1998 (age 27)
- Place of birth: Göppingen, Germany
- Height: 1.76 m (5 ft 9 in)
- Position: Defensive midfielder

Team information
- Current team: FIU
- Number: 28

Youth career
- SpVgg Altenerding
- SE Freising
- –2017: SpVgg Unterhaching

College career
Years	Team	Apps	(Gls)
2020–2022	North Carolina Tar Heels	58	(3)
2023	FIU	13	(0)

Senior career*
Years	Team	Apps	(Gls)
2015–2018	SpVgg Unterhaching	13	(0)
2018–2020	SV Heimstetten	52	(4)

International career^{‡}
2015–2016	Germany U18	3	(0)
- * Club domestic league appearances and goals as of 14 January 2023 ‡ National team caps and goals as of 17:12, 23 September 2017 (UTC)

Tim Schels (born 28 December 1998) is a German professional footballer who plays as a defensive midfielder for the North Carolina Tar Heels.

== Career ==
In the summer of 2020, Schels joined North Carolina Tar Heels.
