= 2021 America East men's soccer tournament =

- Classification: Division I
- Teams: 6
- Matches: 5
- Attendance: 7,362
- Site: Campus Sites (Higher Seed)
- Champions: Vermont (6th title)
- Winning coach: Rob Dow (1st title)
- MVP: Adrian Schulze Solano (Vermont)
- Broadcast: America East TV

2021 America East Conference men's soccer standings
	Conf.					Overall
Team	W		L		T	W		L		T
No. 9 New Hampshire +	7	–	0	–	1	17	–	2	–	2
Vermont ‡	6	–	1	–	1	13	–	5	–	2
Albany	4	–	3	–	1	10	–	7	–	1
Stony Brook	4	–	4	–	0	8	–	6	–	1
UMBC	3	–	4	–	1	8	–	8	–	3
NJIT	3	–	5	–	0	6	–	12	–	1
UMass Lowell	3	–	5	–	0	4	–	11	–	1
Binghamton	2	–	6	–	0	7	–	9	–	1
Hartford	2	–	6	–	0	4	–	10	–	3
‡ – Tournament champion + – At-large invitation to the 2021 NCAA tournament; As of December 14, 2021; Rankings from United Soccer Coaches; Source: America East

The 2021 America East Conference men's soccer tournament was the postseason men's soccer tournament for the America East Conference held from November 6 through November 14, 2021. The five-match tournament took place at campus sites, with the higher seed hosting. The six-team single-elimination tournament consisted of three rounds based on seeding from regular season conference play. The defending champions were the New Hampshire, who were unable to defend their title, losing in the Final. Vermont won their first tournament in program history after a 1–0 victory in the final over New Hampshire. It was the sixth victory for the Vermont Catamounts soccer program and the first for Head Coach Rob Dow. As tournament champions, Vermont earned the America East's automatic berth into the 2021 NCAA Division I men's soccer tournament.

== Seeding ==
The top six teams in the regular season earned a spot in the tournament, with the top two seeds receiving byes into the Semifinals. NJIT and UMass Lowell finished the regular season tied for the sixth and final tournament spot, with a conference record of 3–5–0. NJIT qualified for the tournament by virtue of their 2–1 overtime win over UMass Lowell on September 18.

Seed	School	Conference Record	Points
1	New Hampshire	7–0–1	22
2	Vermont	6–1–1	19
3	Albany	4–3–1	13
4	Stony Brook	4–4–0	12
5	UMBC	3–4–1	10
6	NJIT	3–5–0	9

== Bracket ==
Quarterfinals; Saturday, Nov. 6
4	Stony Brook	1 (7)
5	UMBC (pen.)	1 (8)
3	Albany	1
6	NJIT	2

Semifinals; Wednesday, Nov. 10
1	New Hampshire	4
5	UMBC	0
2	Vermont	3
6	NJIT	2

Final; Sunday, Nov. 14
1	New Hampshire	0
2	Vermont	1

== Schedule ==
=== Quarterfinals ===
November 6, 2021	#4 Stony Brook	1–1 (a.e.t.) (7–8 p)	#5 UMBC	Stony Brook, NY
4:00 p.m. ET	Rondell Payne (yellow card) 17'; UMBC Own Goal 55' (o.g.); Kori Cupid (yellow card) 56'	Report	54' (pen.), (yellow card) 85' Julian Conze	Stadium: Kenneth P. LaValle Stadium; Attendance: 0 Referee: Jan Halaska; Assistant referees: Keith Fisher; Greg Muhs; Fourth official: Stephen Danisi
	Penalties
	Kori Cupid (penalty scored); Gabriel Fernandes (penalty scored); Jonas Bickus (penalty scored); Aki Solvason (penalty scored); Selcuk Kahveci (penalty scored); Trevor Harrison (penalty scored); Sebastian Rojek (penalty scored); Bas Beckhoven (penalty missed)		(penalty scored) Julian Conze; (penalty scored) Jackson Becher; (penalty scored) Ryan Becher; (penalty scored) Hans Nesheim; (penalty scored) Taylor Calheira; (penalty scored) Nik Steiner; (penalty scored) William Forby; (penalty scored) Qantrell Jones

November 6, 2021	#3 Albany	1–2	#6 NJIT	Albany, NY
7:00 p.m. ET	Bjarki Leosson 44' (pen.); Austin DaSilva (yellow card) 72'	Report	43' Alejandro Rabell; 58' Goncalo Franco; (yellow card) 71' Alejandro Flores Valentin; (yellow card) 72' Joao Costa	Stadium: Tom & Mary Casey Stadium; Attendance: 500; Referee: Matt Stein; Assistant referees: Mark Barile; Christopher Crocker; Fourth official: Yevgeniy Mednikov

=== Semifinals ===
November 10, 2021	#1 New Hampshire	4–0	#5 UMBC	Durham, NH
6:00 p.m. ET	Johann von Knebel 4'; Paul Mayer 32'; Rory O'Driscoll 53'; Linus Fallberg 64'; Yannick Bright (yellow card) 65'	Report	(yellow card) 41' Mackie Sacarellos; (yellow card) 87' Jago Lott	Stadium: Wildcat Stadium; Attendance: 2,455; Referee: Carlos Fernandes; Assistant referees: Risto Gjeorgiev; Michael Kelley; Fourth official: Ron Libby

November 10, 2021	#2 Vermont	3–2	#6 NJIT	Burlington, VT
6:00 p.m. ET	Yves Borie 39'; Adrian Solano (yellow card) 52'; Joe Morrison 61'; Jacob Vitale 78'	Report	(yellow card) 31' Joao Costa; (yellow card) 57' Jose Adames; 86' Asembo Augo; 88' Regsan Watkins	Stadium: Virtue Field; Attendance: 1,004; Referee: Mounir Idmalak; Assistant referees: Larry Bechard; Jim Myers; Fourth official: Jay Valliers

=== Final ===
November 14, 2021	#1 New Hampshire	0–1	#2 Vermont	Durham, NH
2:00 p.m. ET		Report	(yellow card) 20' Garrett Lillie; 68' Yves Borie; (yellow card) 87' Adrian Solano	Stadium: Wildcat Stadium; Attendance: 3,403; Referee: Carlos Fernandes; Assistant referees: Sean Regan; John Luk; Fourth official: John Jordan

== Statistics ==
=== Goalscorers ===
There were 15 goals scored in 5 matches, for an average of 3 goals per match (as of November 14, 2021).

2 goals

- Yves Borie – Vermont

1 goal

- Bjarki Leosson – Albany
- Linus Fallberg – New Hampshire
- Johann von Knebel – New Hampshire
- Paul Mayer – New Hampshire
- Rory O'Driscoll – New Hampshire
- Asembo Augo – NJIT
- Goncalo Franco – NJIT
- Alejandro Rabell – NJIT
- Regsan Watkins – NJIT
- Julian Conze – UMBC
- Joe Morrison – Vermont
- Jacob Vitale – Vermont

1 own goal

- UMBC (against Stony Brook)

== All-Tournament team ==
Player	Team
**Adrian Schulze Solano**	Vermont
Yves Borie	Vermont
Noah Egan	Vermont
Nate Silveira	Vermont
Bridger Hansen	New Hampshire
Bilal Kamal	New Hampshire
Johann von Knebel	New Hampshire
Hans Nesheim	UMBC
Julian Conze	UMBC
Regsan Watkins	NJIT
Rene White	NJIT
Austin DaSilva	Albany
Kori Cupid	Stony Brook

MVP in bold
