= Kazuna Takase =

Japanese footballer

Personal information
- Full name: Kazuna Takase
- Date of birth: August 6, 1999 (age 27)
- Place of birth: Tokyo, Japan
- Height: 1.82 m (5 ft 11 1/2 in)
- Position: Goalkeeper

Youth career
- FC Tokyo

College career
Years	Team	Apps	(Gls)
2018–2021	USF Bulls		

Senior career*
Years	Team	Apps	(Gls)
2017	FC Tokyo		
- * Club domestic league appearances and goals

Kazuna Takase (髙瀨 和楠, Takase Kazuna; born August 6, 1999) is a Japanese football player. He plays for FC Tokyo.

== Career ==
Kazuna Takase joined J1 League club FC Tokyo in 2017.
