= 2021 Big East Conference men's soccer tournament =

2021 soccer event in Washington D.C., USA

- Classification: Division I
- Teams: 6
- Matches: 5
- Attendance: 4,496
- Site: Shaw Field (Semifinals and Finals); Washington, D.C.
- Champions: Georgetown (5th title)
- Winning coach: Brian Wiese (5th title)
- MVP: Stefan Stojanovic (Offensive); Giannis Nikopolidis (Defensive) (Georgetown)
- Broadcast: Big East Network (Quarterfinals and Semifinals), Fox Sports 2 (Final)

2021 Big East Conference men's soccer standings
	Conf.					Overall
Team	W		L		T	W		L		T
No. 3 Georgetown ‡	8	–	2	–	0	18	–	3	–	1
No. 16 Providence +	5	–	2	–	3	12	–	5	–	4
St. John's +	5	–	3	–	2	11	–	6	–	3
Villanova +	5	–	4	–	1	12	–	8	–	1
Creighton +	5	–	4	–	1	9	–	8	–	2
Butler	5	–	4	–	1	7	–	9	–	3
Marquette	4	–	5	–	1	7	–	8	–	1
DePaul	3	–	4	–	3	7	–	7	–	3
Xavier	3	–	6	–	1	9	–	7	–	1
UConn	2	–	6	–	2	7	–	7	–	2
Seton Hall	2	–	7	–	1	6	–	8	–	3
‡ – 2021 Big East Tournament champion + – At-large invitation to the 2021 NCAA tournament; As of December 14, 2021; Rankings from United Soccer Coaches; Source: Big East

The 2021 Big East Conference men's soccer tournament was the post-season women's soccer tournament for the Big East Conference held from November 6 to 14, 2021, in the USA. The five-match tournament took place at Shaw Field in Washington, D.C. for the semifinals and finals, while the first round was hosted by the higher seeded team. The six-team single-elimination tournament consisted of three rounds based on seeding from regular season conference play. The defending champions were the Seton Hall Pirates. They were unable to defendtheir title after not qualifying for the tournament and finishing in last place in the regular season standings. Georgetown finished as tournament champions after defeating Providence 2–1 in overtime in the final. This is the fifth title in program history for Georgetown, all of which have come under Head Coach Brian Wiese. As tournament champions, Georgetown earned the Big East's automatic place in the 2021 NCAA Division I men's soccer tournament.

== Seeding ==
The top six teams in the regular season earned a spot in the tournament. Teams were seeded based on regular season conference record and tiebreakers were used to determine seedings of teams that finished with the same record. The Semifinals and Finals of the tournament were hosted by the first seed, Georgetown. A tiebreaker was required to determine the fourth, fifth and sixth seeds as Creighton, Villanova and Butler all finished with identical 5–4–1 regular season records. When three teams are tied, a "mini-conference" is created with those three teams and the team with the best record is awarded the highest seed. Creighton earned the fourth seed after going 2–0–0 against Villanova and Butler. Villanova earned the fifth seed by going 1–1–0 against the other teams. Butler was the sixth seed after posting a 0–2–0 record against the other teams.

Seed	School	Conference record	Points
1	Georgetown	8–2–0	21
2	Providence	5–2–3	18
3	St. John's	5–3–2	17
4	Creighton	5–4–1	16
5	Villanova	5–4–1	16
6	Butler	5–4–1	16

== Bracket ==
First round Saturday, Nov. 6
3	St. John's	0 (2)
6	Butler (pen.)	0 (4)
4	Creighton	1
5	Villanova	2

Semifinals; Thursday, Nov. 4
1	Georgetown	1
5	Villanova	0
2	Providence	2
6	Butler	0

Final; Sunday, Nov. 7
1	Georgetown (a.e.t.)	2
2	Providence	1

== Schedule ==
=== Quarterfinals ===
November 6, 2021	#3 St. John's	0–0 (a.e.t.) (2–4 p)	#6 Butler	Queens, NY
5:00 p.m. ET	Wesley Leggett (yellow card) 63'; Hugo Monteiro (yellow card) 95'; Rafael Bustamante (yellow card) 109'	Report	(yellow card) 31' Jack Haywood; (yellow card) 35' Griffin DeBolt; (yellow card) 77' (yellow-red card) 90' Perrin Barnes	Stadium: Belson Stadium; Attendance: 495; Referee: Andrea Pileri; Assistant referees: David Belmnahia; Timmoth Bramble; Fourth official: Stephen Cope
	Penalties
	Johan Aquilon (penalty scored); Lucas Bartlett (penalty scored); Jared Juleau (penalty missed); Einar Lye (penalty missed)		(penalty scored) Griffin DeBolt; (penalty scored) Jack Haywood; (penalty scored) Louie Bulger; (penalty scored) Joel Harvey

November 6, 2021	#4 Creighton	1–2	#5 Villanova	Omaha, NE
6:00 p.m. CT	Alejandro Maillet (yellow card) 22'; Cameron Briggs (yellow card) 28'; Daniel Espeleta 64'; Musa Qongo (yellow card) 90'	Report	(yellow card) 14' Josh Belluz; 76' Akinjide Awujo; 84' Luke Pompliano	Stadium: Morrison Stadium; Attendance: 1,296; Referee: Noah Matos; Assistant referees: Shane Labenz; TJ Bartels

=== Semifinals ===
November 11, 2021	#1 Georgetown	1–0	#5 Villanova	Washington, D.C.
11:00 a.m. ET	Chris Hegardt (yellow card) 81'; Joe Buck 90'	Report	(yellow card) 62' Marcus Brenes; (yellow card) 67' Jorge Garcia; (yellow card) 77' Akinjide Awujo; (yellow card) 81' Dominic Cyriacks; (yellow card) 86' Lyam MacKinnon; (yellow card) 87' Viktor Benediktsson	Stadium: Shaw Field; Attendance: 861; Referee: Jose Rivero; Assistant referees: Ryan Meyers; Tyler McElhinney; Fourth official: Ryan Trombetta

November 11, 2021	#2 Providence	2–0	#6 Butler	Washington, D.C.
1:30 p.m. ET	Simon Triantafilou (yellow card) 58'; Brendan McSorley 65'; Gevork Diarbian 66'	Report	(yellow card) 75' Griffin DeBolt	Stadium: Shaw Field; Attendance: 277; Referee: Mike Stutt; Assistant referees: Hugo Menguy; Matthew Richardson; Fourth official: Balvir Garcia

=== Final ===
November 14, 2021	#1 Georgetown	2–1 (a.e.t.)	#2 Providence	Washington, D.C.
Noon ET	Stefan Stojanovic 51' (pen.), (yellow card) 83', 96'; Giannis Nikopolidis (yellow card) 64'; Sean Zawadzki (yellow card) 73'	Report	(yellow card) 39' Team; (yellow card) 39' Team; (yellow card) 42' Cole Dewhurst; (yellow card) 52' Ramzi Qawasmy; (yellow card) 77' Armaan Wilson; 85' Brendan McSorley; (yellow card) 89' Migue Candela Bravo	Stadium: Shaw Field; Attendance: 1,567; Referee: Sergio Gonzalez; Assistant referees: Will Aten; Matt Nelson; Fourth official: James Sadowski

== Statistics ==
=== Goalscorers ===
There were 9 goals scored in 5 matches, for an average of 1.8 goals per match.

2 goals

- Stefan Stojanovic – Georgetown
- Brendan McSorley – Providence

1 goal

- Daniel Espeleta – Creighton
- Joe Buck – Georgetown
- Gevork Diarbian – Providence
- Akinjide Awujo – Villanova
- Luke Pompliano – Villanova

== All-Tournament team ==
Player	Team
Griffin DeBolt	Butler
Rhys Myers	Butler
Josh Belluz	Villanova
Carson Williams	Villanova
Lukas Burns	Providence
Gevork Diarbian	Providence
Brendan McSorley	Providence
Joe Buck	Georgetown
Giannis Nikopolidis^	Georgetown
Stefan Stojanovic*	Georgetown
Sean Zawadzki	Georgetown

* Offensive MVP
^ Defensive MVP
