= 2021 CAA men's soccer tournament =

- Classification: Division I
- Teams: 4
- Matches: 3
- Attendance: 1,732
- Site: Hofstra Soccer Stadium; Hempstead, NY
- Champions: Hofstra (5th title)
- Winning coach: Richard Nuttall (5th title)
- MVP: Matthew Vowinkel (Hofstra)
- Broadcast: FloSports

2021 Colonial Athletic Association men's soccer standings
	Conf.					Overall
Team	W		L		T	W		L		T
No. 13 Hofstra ‡	5	–	1	–	2	18	–	2	–	2
Northeastern	5	–	2	–	1	11	–	6	–	2
James Madison *	5	–	3	–	0	11	–	5	–	1
Elon	4	–	2	–	2	9	–	8	–	2
Drexel	4	–	3	–	1	8	–	8	–	1
UNC Wilmington	4	–	3	–	1	9	–	6	–	2
William & Mary	4	–	4	–	0	7	–	7	–	0
College of Charleston	1	–	6	–	1	5	–	8	–	3
Delaware	0	–	8	–	0	2	–	12	–	1
* – Ineligible for the 2021 CAA Tournament due to postseason ban imposed by the CAA.
‡ – 2021 CAA Tournament champion + – At-large invitation to the 2021 NCAA tournament; As of December 14, 2021; Rankings from United Soccer Coaches; Source: CAA

The 2021 CAA men's soccer tournament was the postseason men's soccer tournament for the Colonial Athletic Association held from November 11 through November 14, 2021. The tournament was held at Hofstra Soccer Stadium in Hempstead, NY. The four-team single-elimination tournament consisted of two rounds based on seeding from regular season conference play. The defending champions were the James Madison Dukes. They were unable to defend their crown as they were under a post season ban from the CAA. The Hofstra Pride won the tournament by defeating Elon 3–2 in the final. The conference tournament title was the fifth overall for the Hofstra men's soccer program all of which have come under head coach Richard Nuttall. As tournament champions, Hofstra earned the CAA's automatic berth into the 2021 NCAA Division I men's soccer tournament.

== Seeding ==
The top four teams in the regular season earned a spot in the tournament. Teams were seeded based on regular season conference record and tiebreakers were used to determine seedings of teams that finished with the same record. James Madison Dukes finished third in the regular season standings but could not participate due to a postseason ban handed down by the CAA. A tiebreaker was required to determine who would make the tournament as Drexel and UNC Wilmington finished tied on 13 points with 4–3–1 records. Drexel defeated UNC Wilmington on September 11, 2–0 and earned the final tournament spot.

Seed	School	Conference Record	Points
1	Hofstra	5–1–2	17
2	Northeastern	5–2–1	16
3	Elon	4–2–2	14
4	Drexel	4–3–1	13

== Bracket ==
Semifinals; Thursday, November 11
1	Hofstra	2
4	Drexel	1
2	Northeastern	0
3	Elon	1

Final; Sunday, November 14
1	Hofstra	3
3	Elon	2

== Schedule ==
=== Semifinals ===
November 11, 2021	#1 Hofstra	2–1	#4 Drexel	Hempstead, NY
4:30 p.m. EST	Matthew Vowinkel 12', 50'; Ryan Carmichael (yellow card) 90'	Report	18' Naiel Nesseler; (yellow card) 38' Ori Arzi; (yellow card) 54' Patrick Murphy	Stadium: Hofstra Soccer Stadium; Attendance: 472; Referee: Jan Halaska; Assistant referees: Greg DeMello; David Belmnahia; Fourth official: Joe Zawistowski

November 11, 2021	#2 Northeastern	0–1	#3 Elon	Hempstead, NY
7:30 p.m. EST	Soren Ilsoe (yellow card) 19'	Report	(yellow card) 49' Vemund Hole Vik; (yellow card) 65' Sam Bacon; 75' (pen.) Scott Vatne; (yellow card) 77' Kasper Lehm	Stadium: Hofstra Soccer Stadium; Attendance: 473; Referee: Andrea Pileri; Assistant referees: Franco Somma; Kevin Rodrigo; Fourth official: Greg Muhs

=== Final ===
November 14, 2021	#1 Hofstra	3–2	#3 Elon	Hempstead, NY
1:00 p.m. EST	Pierce Infuso (yellow card) 48'; Matthew Vowinkel 53', 72'; Stefan Mason 57'; Francesco Perinelli (yellow card) 70'	Report	6' Vemund Hole Vik; (yellow card) 49' Kasper Lehm; (yellow card) 60' Team; 79' Jack Edwards	Stadium: Hofstra Soccer Stadium; Attendance: 787; Referee: Kevin Morrison; Assistant referees: Brendan Quinn; Bruno Mozzo; Fourth official: David Breckner

== Statistics ==
=== Goalscorers ===
There were 9 goals scored in 3 matches, for an average of 3 goals per match (as of November 14, 2021).

4 goals

- Matthew Vowinkel – Hofstra

1 goal

- Naiel Nesseler – Drexel
- Jack Edwards – Elon
- Vemund Hole Vik – Elon
- Scott Vatne – Elon
- Stefan Mason – Hofstra

== All-Tournament team ==
Player	Team
**Matthew Vowinkel**	Hofstra
Roc Carles	Hofstra
Stefan Mason	Hofstra
Francesco Perinelli	Hofstra
Ben Rosenblatt	Elon
Scott Vatne	Elon
Jannik Videbaek	Elon
Chris Donovan	Drexel
Daniel Nesseler	Drexel
Jacob Marin-Thomson	Northeastern
Dan Munch	Northeastern

MVP in bold
