= Sofiane Djeffal =

French footballer (born 1999)

Personal information
- Full name: Sofiane Djeffal
- Date of birth: 19 April 1999 (age 27)
- Place of birth: Nantes, France
- Height: 5 ft 10 in (1.78 m)
- Position: Midfielder

Team information
- Current team: New Mexico United
- Number: 18

Youth career
- 2007–2018: Nantes

College career
Years	Team	Apps	(Gls)
2018–2021	Oregon State Beavers	66	(20)

Senior career*
Years	Team	Apps	(Gls)
2019	Portland Timbers U23s	2	(0)
2022	D.C. United	28	(0)
2023	Austin FC	7	(0)
2024	Orange County SC	12	(1)
2024	San Antonio FC	9	(0)
2025	Lexington SC	19	(1)
2026–	New Mexico United	1	(0)
- * Club domestic league appearances and goals as of 10:15, 10 November 2026 (UTC)

Sofiane Djeffal (born 19 April 1999) is a French professional footballer who plays as a midfielder for USL Championship club New Mexico United.

== Career ==
=== Youth ===
Born in Nantes, Djeffal spent 11 years within local Ligue 1 side FC Nantes's youth academy, where he won a league title at the U17 level.

=== Oregon State Beavers ===
Ahead of the 2018 NCAA Division I men's soccer season, Djeffal signed a National Letter of Intent to play college soccer at Oregon State University for the Oregon State Beavers men's soccer program. During his freshman year, Djeffal was an immediate starter in the squad, starting and playing in all 20 matches during his freshman season. During the freshman campaign, he had five goals and seven assists. At the end of his freshman season, he received numerous Pac-12 Conference and national accolades, including being named the Pac-12 Men's Soccer Freshman of the Year, being named to the All-Pac-12 First Team (best XI), and to the TopDrawer Soccer best XI.

He remained a full-time starter in his sophomore season, starting and playing in all 16 matches his sophomore year, having three goals and six assists. During his junior year, he started 10 of the 11 matches, contributing to 6 goals and two assists. He was named to the All-Pac-12 First Team both his sophomore and junior season. During his senior year at Oregon State, Djeffal started in all 19 matches, contributing to six goals and six assists. Upon conclusion of the 2021 NCAA Division I men's soccer season, Djeffal was named the Pac-12 Conference Men's Soccer Player of the Year and an semifinalist for the Hermann Trophy, an annual award for the best college soccer player in the United States.

While at college, Djeffal appeared for USL League Two side Portland Timbers U23s during their 2019 season, making two appearances.

=== D.C. United ===
On 11 January 2022, Djeffal was drafted in the second round with the 36th overall pick for D.C. United in the 2022 MLS SuperDraft. After impressing in preseason training, he signed a contract with United on 25 February 2022.

On 26 February 2022, Djeffal made his professional debut for United, coming on in the final 26 minutes in a 3–0 win over Charlotte FC.

Following the 2022 season, his contract option was declined by D.C. United.

=== Austin FC ===
On 17 November 2022, Djeffal was selected by Austin FC with the first pick in the MLS Re-Entry Draft Stage 1. He made his debut for the club on March 25, 2023, coming on as a substitution in the second half against the Colorado Rapids.

On 21 May 2023, Djeffal made his first start for Austin, replacing Jhojan Valencia in central midfield. On November 17, 2023, Austin FC announced they would not exercise the 2024 option for Djeffal.

=== Lexington SC ===
Djeffal transferred to Lexington SC on 6 January 2025, ahead of the club's first season competing in the USL Championship.

=== New Mexico United ===
On 26 January 2026, New Mexico United announced they had signed Djeffal to a contract for the 2026 USL Championship season.

== Personal life ==
Djeffal was born in the northwest of France and is of Algerian descent.

== Career statistics ==
=== Club ===
As of July 12, 2023

Appearances and goals by club, season and competition
Club	Season	Division	League		League Cup		National cup		Continental (Note: Appearance(s) in CONCACAF Champions League)		Other		Total	
Club	Season	Division	Apps	Goals	Apps	Goals	Apps	Goals	Apps	Goals	Apps	Goals	Apps	Goals
Portland Timbers U23s	2019	USL League Two	2	0	—		—		—		—		2	0
D.C. United	2022	Major League Soccer	28	0	—		0	0	—		—		28	0
D.C. United	Club Total		30	0	—		—		—		—		30	0
Austin FC	2023	Major League Soccer	7	0	0	0	2	0	1	0	0	0	10	0
Career total			37	0	0	0	2	0	1	0	0	0	40	0

== Honors ==
Individual

- Pac-12 Conference Men's Soccer Player of the Year: 2021
