= Bakary Bagayoko =

Guinean footballer

Personal information
- Date of birth: October 7, 1998 (age 28)
- Place of birth: Conakry, Guinea
- Height: 1.85 m (6 ft 1 in)
- Position: Forward

Youth career
- South Bronx United
- –2017: Manhattan SC

College career
Years	Team	Apps	(Gls)
2017–2020	Cumberland Phoenix	60	(38)
2021	Lipscomb Bisons	17	(5)

Senior career*
Years	Team	Apps	(Gls)
2019	Lakeland Tropics	6	(0)
2019	Reading United	3	(3)
2021	Ocean City Nor'easters	8	(2)
2022–2023	Sporting Kansas City II	19	(4)
- * Club domestic league appearances and goals as of January 6, 2024

Bakary Bagayoko (born 7 October 1998) is a Guinean professional footballer.

== Career ==
=== College and amateur ===
Bagayoko began his college career playing for Cumberland University. In 2021, Bagayoko was named to the All-Mid-South Conference First Team and was an NAIA All-American Honorable Mention.

While at college, Bagayoko also appeared in the USL League Two with Lakeland Tropics, Reading United, and Ocean City Nor'easters.

=== Professional ===
On 17 February 2022, Bagayoko signed a professional contract with Sporting Kansas City II in MLS Next Pro.
