= Justin Ingram (soccer) =

American soccer player (born 1998)

Personal information
- Date of birth: December 21, 1998 (age 27)
- Place of birth: Indianapolis, Indiana, United States
- Height: 1.72 m (5 ft 8 in)
- Position: Attacking midfielder

Youth career
- Carmel United
- Indiana Fire

College career
Years	Team	Apps	(Gls)
2017–2018	Virginia Cavaliers	8	(0)
2019–2021	Loyola Greyhounds	44	(13)

Senior career*
Years	Team	Apps	(Gls)
2018	FC Indiana	5	(0)
2019	Flint City Bucks	2	(0)
2022	Indy Eleven	30	(0)
2023	Las Vegas Lights	26	(1)
2025	Hartford Athletic	0	(0)
- * Club domestic league appearances and goals as of October 17, 2023

Justin Ingram (born December 21, 1998) is an American soccer player.

== Career ==
=== Youth ===
Ingram was part of the Carmel United side that won three Indiana State Championships. Ingram was also part of the Indiana Fire Academy. Ingram also spent time with the United States under-15 and United States under-19 teams.

=== College and amateur ===
In 2018, Ingram attended the University of Virginia to play college soccer, but struggled for playing time in his two seasons with the Cavaliers, making only eight appearances. In 2019, Ingram transferred to Loyola University Maryland, where he found success over his 44 appearances, scoring 13 goals and adding 18 assists to his name. He achieved accolades including All-Patriot League Second Team in 2019, was a two-time All-Patriot League First Team, a two-time Patriot League All-Tournament Team, a two-time Patriot League Midfielder of the Year, and was a two-time United Soccer Coaches First Team All-Atlantic Region selection.

In 2018, Ingram played with NPSL side FC Indiana during the team struggled to a 0–0–12 record. During his 2019 season, Ingram appeared for USL League Two side Flint City Bucks, helping the team become the 2019 USL League Two season champions with six appearances over the regular season and playoffs, scoring a single goal.

=== Professional ===
On January 11, 2022, Ingram was selected 48th overall in the 2022 MLS SuperDraft by Inter Miami. However, he was not signed by the club. On February 15, 2022, it was announced that Ingram had joined USL Championship club Indy Eleven. He made his professional debut on March 12, 2022, starting against Loudoun United. He was released by Indy Eleven on November 30, 2022, following the conclusion of the 2022 season.

Ingram was announced as a new signing for USL Championship side Las Vegas Lights on January 25, 2023.

On April 11, 2025, Ingram signed a short-term deal with USL Championship side Hartford Athletic.

== Honors ==
=== Club ===
Flint City Bucks

- USL League Two: 2019
