= 2016 Atlantic Coast Conference men's soccer season =

- League: NCAA Division I
- Sport: Soccer
- Duration: August, 2016 – November, 2016
- Teams: 12

2017 MLS SuperDraft
- Top draft pick: Miles Robinson, Syracuse
- Picked by: Atlanta United FC, 2nd overall

Regular season
- Season champions: Atlantic: Wake Forest; Coastal: North Carolina
- Runners-up: Atlantic: Louisville; Coastal: Virginia
- Season MVP: Offensive: Jon Gallagher; Midfielder: Ian Harkes; Defensive: Miles Robinson
- Top scorer: Jon Gallagher (14)

Tournament
- Champions: Wake Forest
- Runners-up: Clemson
- Finals MVP: Ian Harkes

ACC men's soccer seasons
- ← 2015 2017 →

2016 ACC men's soccer standings
	Conf.					Overall
Team	W		L		T	W		L		T
Atlantic
No. 2 Wake Forest ‡	5	–	1	–	2	19	–	2	–	4
No. 6 Louisville +	5	–	2	–	1	14	–	6	–	2
No. 5 Clemson +	4	–	1	–	3	14	–	4	–	5
No. 11 Syracuse +	4	–	2	–	3	12	–	4	–	4
Boston College +	3	–	3	–	3	9	–	9	–	3
NC State	1	–	8	–	0	5	–	12	–	0
Coastal
No. 4 North Carolina +	5	–	1	–	2	14	–	3	–	4
No. 13 Virginia +	4	–	2	–	3	11	–	4	–	5
No. 14 Notre Dame +	4	–	3	–	2	12	–	7	–	2
No. 8 Virginia Tech +	3	–	4	–	2	13	–	5	–	4
Duke	2	–	6	–	1	7	–	8	–	2
Pittsburgh	0	–	7	–	2	2	–	13	–	3
‡-2016 ACC Tournament champion + - Invited to the NCAA Division I Men's Soccer Championship; As of 13 December 2016; Rankings from NSCAA

The 2016 Atlantic Coast Conference men's soccer season was the 63rd season of men's varsity soccer in the conference.

The Wake Forest Demon Deacons and the Syracuse Orange were the defending regular season and tournament champions, respectively.

== Changes from 2015 ==
- Jay Vidovich replaced Joe Luxbacher has the Pittsburgh Panthers head coach

== Teams ==
=== Stadiums and locations ===
Atlantic Division
Team	Stadium	Capacity
Boston College Eagles	Newton Soccer Complex	2,500
Clemson Tigers	Riggs Field	6,500
Louisville Cardinals	Lynn Stadium	5,300
NC State Wolfpack	Method Road	3,000
Syracuse Orange	SU Soccer Stadium	5,000
Wake Forest Demon Deacons	Spry Stadium	3,000

Coastal Division
Team	Stadium	Capacity
Duke Blue Devils	Koskinen Stadium	7,000
North Carolina Tar Heels	Fetzer Field	5,025
Notre Dame Fighting Irish	Alumni Stadium	2,500
Pittsburgh Panthers	Ambrose Urbanic Field	735
Virginia Cavaliers	Klöckner Stadium	8,000
Virginia Tech Hokies	Thompson Field	2,500

1. Florida State, Georgia Tech and Miami do not sponsor men's soccer

=== Personnel ===
Team	Head coach	Captain
Boston College Eagles	(Republic of Ireland) Ed Kelly	(Bermuda) Zeiko Lewis
Clemson Tigers	(United States) Mike Noonan	(Denmark) Patrick Bunk-Andersen
Duke Blue Devils	(United States) John Kerr Jr.	(United States) Ryan Thompson
Louisville Cardinals	(United States) Ken Lolla	(United States) Michael DeGraffenreidt
NC State Wolfpack	(United States) Kelly Findley	(United States) Alex McCauley
North Carolina Tar Heels	(Guatemala) Carlos Somoano	(United States) Colton Storm
Notre Dame Fighting Irish	(Scotland) Bobby Clark	(United States) Chris Hubbard
Pittsburgh Panthers	(United States) Jay Vidovich	(Switzerland) Romeo Charron
Syracuse Orange	(England) Ian McIntyre	(United States) Liam Callahan
Virginia Cavaiers	(United States) George Gelnovatch	(France) Nicko Corriveau
Virginia Tech Hokies	(United States) Mike Brizendine	(Germany) Som Essome
Wake Forest Demon Deacons	(United States) Bobby Muuss	(United States) Ian Harkes

== Regular season ==
=== Rankings ===
==== National Soccer Coaches Association of America ====
Legend
Increase in ranking
Decrease in ranking
Not ranked previous week

	Pre	Wk 1	Wk 2	Wk 3	Wk 4	Wk 5	Wk 6	Wk 7	Wk 8	Wk 9	Wk 10	Wk 11	Wk 12	Final
Boston College	11	11	25	15	RV	RV	RV	RV	RV	RV		25	RV	RV
Clemson	3	2	2	6	7	5	5	3	8	5	3	3	3	5
Duke			RV											
Louisville			RV	RV	13	9	8	4	13	7	10	9	7	6
North Carolina	8	3	3	2	9	4	4	8	3	3	4	10	10	4
NC State		RV	RV											
Notre Dame	9	4	1	1	3	2	2	2	4	12	16	20	15	14
Pittsburgh														
Syracuse	6	6	6	5	2	3	3	10	6	6	7	6	8	11
Virginia	17	12	17	17	16	RV	RV	21	16	17	17	17	16	13
Virginia Tech		RV	15	23	19	18	18	15	23	23	23	RV	RV	8
Wake Forest	5	21	21	12	14	11	11	7	2	2	2	2	2	2

==== Top Drawer Soccer ====
Legend
Increase in ranking
Decrease in ranking
Not ranked previous week

	Pre	Wk 1	Wk 2	Wk 3	Wk 4	Wk 5	Wk 6	Wk 7	Wk 8	Wk 9	Wk 10	Wk 11	Wk 12	Wk 13	Wk 14	Wk 15	Wk 16	Final
Boston College	15	10	10	18	18	16	25	14	12	23	RV	RV	17					
Clemson	10	8	8	5	6	5	6	4	4	4	4	3	3	4	4	5	5	5
Duke				20	RV													
Louisville				17	13	6	4	6	3	12	8	13	12	7	6	6	6	6
North Carolina	1	1	1	1	1	3	2	2	6	2	5	4	9	9	8	4	4	4
NC State																		
Notre Dame	19		12	6	2	2	1	1	1	3	9	12	14	13	11	17	17	17
Pittsburgh																		
Syracuse	5	4	4	3	3	1	3	3	11	9	7	7	5	6	5	11	11	11
Virginia	RV	17	17	13	23	19	19	19	15	8	11	11	13	16	13	13	13	13
Virginia Tech							17	17	17	RV	23				20	8	8	8
Wake Forest	11	23	23				11	12	10	7	2	2	2	2	1	1	1	2

== Postseason ==
=== ACC tournament ===
Semifinals
8	Boston College	0
4	Clemson	1
3	Louisville	1
2	Wake Forest	2

Final
4	Clemson	1
2	Wake Forest	3

=== NCAA tournament ===
A record nine teams will participate in the NCAA tournament. Seven of the nine teams earned seeds and byes to the second round.

Seed	Region	School	1st round	2nd round	3rd round	Quarterfinals	Semifinals	Championship
2	4	Wake Forest	BYE	W 2–0 vs. Coastal Carolina – (Winston-Salem)	W 2–1 vs. SIUE – (Winston-Salem)	W 2–0 vs. Virginia Tech – (Winston-Salem)	W 2–1 vs. #6 Denver – (Houston)	T, 0–0 ^{L, 4–5 PK} vs. #5 Stanford – (Houston)
3	3	Clemson	BYE	W 2–1 (OT) vs. South Carolina – (Clemson)	W 3–1 vs. #14 Albany – (Clemson)	L 0–1 vs. #6 Denver – (Clemson)		
4	2	Louisville	BYE	W 2–1 vs. UCLA – (Louisville)	W 3–1 vs. #13 Notre Dame – (Louisville)	L 0–2 vs. #5 Stanford – (Louisville)		
8	1	Syracuse	BYE	W 3–0 vs. Dartmouth – (Syracuse)	L 0–1 vs. #9 North Carolina – (Syracuse)			
9	1	North Carolina	BYE	W 3–2 (OT) vs. FGCU – (Chapel Hill)	W 1–0 vs. #8 Syracuse – (Syracuse)	W 1–0 (2OT) vs. Providence – (Chapel Hill)	T, 0–0 ^{L, 9–10 PK} vs. #5 Stanford – (Houston)	
12	2	Virginia	BYE	W 2–1 (2OT) vs. Vermont – (Charlottesville)	L 0–1 vs. #5 Stanford – (Stanford)			
13	2	Notre Dame	BYE	W 1–0 vs. Loyola-Chicago – (Notre Dame)	L 1–3 vs. #4 Louisville – (Louisville)			
—N/a	3	Boston College	W 1–0 vs. Fordham – (Boston)	L 0–3 vs. #14 Albany – (Albany)				
—N/a	4	Virginia Tech	W 1–0 vs. ETSU – (Blacksburg)	W 3–2 vs. #10 Charlotte – (Charlotte)	W 2–1 (OT) vs. #7 Indiana – (Bloomington)	L 0–1 vs. #2 Wake Forest – (Winston-Salem)		

== All-ACC awards and teams ==
2016 ACC Men's Soccer Individual Awards
Award	Recipient(s)
Offensive Player of the Year	Jon Gallagher, Notre Dame
Midfielder of the Year	Ian Harkes, Wake Forest
Defensive Player of the Year	Miles Robinson, Syracuse
Freshman of the Year	Cam Lindley, North Carolina
Coach of the Year	Bobby Muuss, Wake Forest

2016 ACC Men's Soccer All-Conference Teams
First Team	Second Team	Third Team	Freshman Team
Zeiko Lewis, Sr., F, Boston College; Tim Kübel, Jr., D, Louisville; Mohamed Thiaw, Jr., F, Louisville; Cam Lindley, Fr., M, North Carolina; Brandon Aubrey, Sr., D, Notre Dame; Jon Gallagher, Jr., F, Notre Dame; Chris Nanco, Sr., F, Syracuse; Miles Robinson, So., D, Syracuse; Alec Ferrell, Sr., G, Wake Forest; Ian Harkes, Sr., M, Wake Forest; Jacori Hayes, Sr., M, Wake Forest	Diego Campos, Jr., F, Clemson; Oliver Shannon, Jr., M, Clemson; Brian White, Jr., F, Duke; Colton Storm, Sr., D, North Carolina; Alan Winn, Jr., F, North Carolina; Zach Wright, Jr., F, North Carolina; Julius Duchscherer, So., M, NC State; Pablo Aguilar, Jr., M, Virginia; Jeff Caldwell, Jr., G, Virginia; Edward Opoku, So., F, Virginia; Marcelo Acuna, Jr., F, Virginia Tech	Patrick Bunk-Andersen, So., D, Clemson; Geoffrey Dee, Jr., M, Louisville; Daniel Johnson, Sr., M, Louisville; Walker Hume, Sr., D, North Carolina; James Pyle, So., G, North Carolina; Evan Panken, Gr., M, Notre Dame; Mo Adams, Fr., M, Syracuse; Jean-Christophe Koffi, So., M, Virginia; Sergi Nus, So., D, Virginia; Brad Dunwell, So., M, Wake Forest; Kevin Politz, Jr., D, Wake Forest	Lasse Lehmann, Fr., M, Boston College; Malick Mbaye, Fr., D, Clemson; Tanner Dieterich, Fr., D, Clemson; Suniel Veerakone, Fr., M, Duke; Max Moser, Fr., M, Duke; Cam Lindley, Fr., M, North Carolina; Mauricio Pineda, Fr., M, North Carolina; Tommy McCabe, Fr., M, Notre Dame; Mo Adams, Fr., M, Syracuse; Robin Afamefuna, Fr., D, Virginia; Terrell Lowe, Fr., M, Virginia; Ema Twumasi, Fr., M, Wake Forest

== Draft picks ==
The ACC had 18 total players selected in the 2017 MLS SuperDraft. There were 7 players selected in the first round, 5 players selected in the second round, 4 players selected in the third round, and 2 players selected in the fourth round. The 18 selections were the most selections from any conference in the draft. ACC schools Louisville and Syracuse lead the league with 4 selections from each school.

FW	Forward	MF	Midfielder	DF	Defender	GK	Goalkeeper

Player	Team	Round	Pick #	Position	School
(United States) Miles Robinson	Atlanta United FC	1st	2	DF	Syracuse
(United States) Jeremy Ebobisse	Portland Timbers	1st	4	FW	Duke
(United States) Daniel Johnson	Chicago Fire	1st	11	MF	Louisville
(United States) Colton Storm	Sporting Kansas City	1st	14	DF	North Carolina
(Bermuda) Zeiko Lewis	New York Red Bulls	1st	17	FW	Boston College
(United States) Jacori Hayes	FC Dallas	1st	18	MF	Wake Forest
(United States) Brandon Aubrey	Toronto FC	1st	21	DF	Notre Dame
(United States) Alec Ferrell	Minnesota United FC	2nd	23	GK	Wake Forest
(United States) Liam Callahan	Colorado Rapids	2nd	24	DF	Syracuse
(United States) Stefan Cleveland	Chicago Fire	2nd	26	GK	Louisville
(England) Aaron Jones	Philadelphia Union	2nd	33	DF	Clemson
(United States) Walker Hume	FC Dallas	2nd	37	DF	North Carolina
(Germany) Robert Moewes	Toronto FC	3rd	52	GK	Duke
(Canada) Chris Nanco	Philadelphia Union	3rd	55	FW	Syracuse
(United States) Michael DeGraffenriedt	New York City FC	3rd	60	DF	Louisville
(Norway) Øyvind Alseth	Toronto FC	3rd	65	MF	Syracuse
(El Salvador) Romilio Hernandez	Portland Timbers	4th	80	MF	Louisville
(United States) Juan Pablo Saavedra	Toronto FC	4th	87	DF	Virginia Tech

== See also ==
- 2016 NCAA Division I men's soccer season
- 2016 ACC Men's Soccer Tournament
- 2016 Atlantic Coast Conference women's soccer season
