= 2016 ACC men's soccer tournament =

Soccer tournament

- Classification: Division I
- Teams: 12
- Matches: 11
- Attendance: 13,026
- Site: MUSC Health Stadium; Charleston, South Carolina
- Champions: Wake Forest (2nd title)
- Winning coach: Bobby Muuss (5th title)
- MVP: Ian Harkes (Wake Forest)
- Broadcast: ACC Network, ESPN3

2016 ACC men's soccer standings
	Conf.					Overall
Team	W		L		T	W		L		T
Atlantic
No. 2 Wake Forest ‡	5	–	1	–	2	19	–	2	–	4
No. 6 Louisville +	5	–	2	–	1	14	–	6	–	2
No. 5 Clemson +	4	–	1	–	3	14	–	4	–	5
No. 11 Syracuse +	4	–	2	–	3	12	–	4	–	4
Boston College +	3	–	3	–	3	9	–	9	–	3
NC State	1	–	8	–	0	5	–	12	–	0
Coastal
No. 4 North Carolina +	5	–	1	–	2	14	–	3	–	4
No. 13 Virginia +	4	–	2	–	3	11	–	4	–	5
No. 14 Notre Dame +	4	–	3	–	2	12	–	7	–	2
No. 8 Virginia Tech +	3	–	4	–	2	13	–	5	–	4
Duke	2	–	6	–	1	7	–	8	–	2
Pittsburgh	0	–	7	–	2	2	–	13	–	3
‡-2016 ACC Tournament champion + - Invited to the NCAA Division I Men's Soccer Championship; As of 13 December 2016; Rankings from NSCAA

The 2016 Atlantic Coast Conference men's soccer tournament is the 30th edition of the ACC Men's Soccer Tournament. The tournament decides the Atlantic Coast Conference champion and guaranteed representative into the 2016 NCAA Division I Men's Soccer Championship.

== Qualification ==
All twelve teams in the Atlantic Coast Conference earned a berth into the ACC Tournament. All rounds were held at the higher seed's home field. The championship match was held in Charleston, S.C. on November 13.

== Bracket ==
First Round
9	Virginia Tech	2
8	Boston College	2
12	Pittsburgh	0
5	Syracuse	4
11	NC State	0
6	Virginia	1
10	Duke	2
7	Notre Dame	3

Quarterfinals
1	North Carolina	0
8	Boston College	1
4	Clemson	1
5	Syracuse	1
3	Louisville	1
6	Virginia	0
2	Wake Forest	1
7	Notre Dame	0

Semifinals
8	Boston College	0
4	Clemson	1
3	Louisville	1
2	Wake Forest	2

Finals
3	Clemson	1
2	Wake Forest	3

== Schedule ==
=== First round ===
November 2, 2016	Virginia Tech	2–2 (a.e.t.) (4–3 p)	Boston College	Chestnut Hill, MA
7:00 p.m. EST	Mion 43', 84'	Report	Lewis 55', 85'	Stadium: Newton Campus Field; Attendance: 238; Referee: Charles Murphy
	Penalties
	Acuna (penalty scored); Mion (penalty scored); Lamps (penalty missed); White (penalty scored); Selvin (penalty missed)		Gudmundson (penalty scored); Forbes (penalty scored); Davock (penalty missed); Lewis (penalty scored); Boudadi (penalty scored)

November 2, 2016	Pittsburgh	0–4	Syracuse	Syracuse, NY
7:00 p.m. EST		Report	Nanco 10' 20'; Hagman 63' 70'	Stadium: SU Soccer Stadium; Attendance: 641; Referee: John McCloskey

November 2, 2016	Virginia	1–0	NC State	Charlottesville, VA
7:00 p.m. EST	Aguilar 81'	Report		Stadium: Klöckner Stadium; Attendance: 941; Referee: Peter Dhima

November 3, 2016	Duke	2–3	Notre Dame	Notre Dame, IN
1:00 p.m. EST	Manley 22'; Mosley 73'	Report	Aubrey 9'; Farina 70'; Gallagher 99'	Stadium: Alumni Stadium; Attendance: 134; Referee: Nick Balcer

=== Quarter-finals ===
November 6, 2016	Boston College	1–0	North Carolina	Chapel Hill, NC
1:00 p.m. EST	Lewis 57'	Report		Stadium: Fetzer Field; Attendance: 1,210; Referee: Nick Balcer

November 6, 2016	Syracuse	1–1 (a.e.t.) (2–4 p)	Clemson	Clemson, SC
1:00 p.m. EST	Camargo 85'	Report	Campos 66'	Stadium: Riggs Field; Attendance: 1,068; Referee: Mark Kadlecik
	Penalties
	Miller (penalty scored); Camargo (penalty missed); Breitenmosser (penalty missed); Lassiter (penalty scored)		Jones (penalty scored); Dieterich (penalty scored); Mbaye (penalty scored); Campos (penalty scored)

November 6, 2016	Virginia	0–1	Louisville	Louisville, KY
1:00 p.m. EST		Report	Kubel 54'	Stadium: Lynn Stadium; Attendance: 1,290; Referee: Charlie Murphy

November 6, 2016	Notre Dame	0–1	Wake Forest	Wake Forest, NC
1:00 p.m. EST		Report	Hayes 74'	Stadium: Spry Stadium; Attendance: 1,971; Referee: Mark Gorak

=== Semi-finals ===
November 9, 2016	Boston College	0–1	Clemson	Clemson, SC
7:00 p.m. EST		Report	Happi 88'	Stadium: Riggs Field; Attendance: 1,546; Referee: Mark Kadlecik

November 9, 2016	Louisville	1–2	Wake Forest	Wake Forest, NC
7:00 p.m. EST	Kubel 90'	Report	Partain 29'; Twumasi 91'	Stadium: Spry Stadium; Attendance: 1,683; Referee: Nikola Aleksic

=== Finals ===
November 13, 2016	Clemson	1–3	Wake Forest	Charleston, SC
2:00 p.m. EST	Dieterich 67'	Report	Harkes 24'; Hayes 35'; Echevarria 43'	Stadium: MUSC Health Stadium; Attendance: 2,304; Referee: Chris Penso

== All-Tournament team ==
**ACC Men’s Soccer All-Tournament team**

Zeiko Lewis, Boston College
Cedric Saladin, Boston College
Patrick Bunk-Andersen, Clemson
Malick Mbaye, Clemson
Oliver Shannon, Clemson
Daniel Johnson, Louisville
Tim Kübel, Louisville
Jon Bakero, Wake Forest
**Ian Harkes**, Wake Forest
Jacori Hayes, Wake Forest
Kevin Politz, Wake Forest

MVP in Bold

== Statistics ==
=== Goalscorers ===
3 goals

- (Bermuda) Zeiko Lewis – Boston College

2 goals

- (Germany) Tim Kübel – Louisville
- (Sweden) Jonathan Hagman – Syracuse
- (Canada) Chris Nanco – Syracuse
- (United States) Alessandro Mion – Virginia Tech
- (United States) Jacori Hayes – Wake Forest

1 goal

- (Costa Rica) Diego Campos – Clemson
- (United States) Tanner Dieterich – Clemson
- (France) Alexandre Happi – Clemson
- (United States) Cameron Mosley- Duke
- (United States) Carter Manley – Duke
- (United States) Brandon Aubrey – Notre Dame
- (United States) Jeffery Farina – Notre Dame
- (Republic of Ireland) Jon Gallagher – Notre Dame
- (Colombia) Sergio Camargo – Syracuse
- (Guatemala) Pablo Aguilar – Virginia
- (United States) Steven Echevarria – Wake Forest
- (United States) Ian Harkes – Wake Forest
- (United States) Hayden Partain – Wake Forest
- (Ghana) Ema Twumasi – Wake Forest

== See also ==
- Atlantic Coast Conference
- 2016 Atlantic Coast Conference men's soccer season
- 2016 NCAA Division I men's soccer season
- 2016 NCAA Division I Men's Soccer Championship
