= 2016 Wake Forest Demon Deacons men's soccer team =

American college soccer season

2016 Wake Forest Demon Deacons men's soccer

ACC Atlantic Division Champions ACC Tournament Champions

NCAA Tournament, runner-up
- Conference: Atlantic Coast Conference

Ranking
- Coaches: No. 2
- Record: 19–2–4 (5–1–2 ACC)
- Head coach: Bobby Muuss (2nd season)
- Assistant coach: Steve Armas (2nd season)
- Home stadium: Spry Stadium

2016 ACC men's soccer standings
	Conf.					Overall
Team	W		L		T	W		L		T
Atlantic
No. 2 Wake Forest ‡	5	–	1	–	2	19	–	2	–	4
No. 6 Louisville +	5	–	2	–	1	14	–	6	–	2
No. 5 Clemson +	4	–	1	–	3	14	–	4	–	5
No. 11 Syracuse +	4	–	2	–	3	12	–	4	–	4
Boston College +	3	–	3	–	3	9	–	9	–	3
NC State	1	–	8	–	0	5	–	12	–	0
Coastal
No. 4 North Carolina +	5	–	1	–	2	14	–	3	–	4
No. 13 Virginia +	4	–	2	–	3	11	–	4	–	5
No. 14 Notre Dame +	4	–	3	–	2	12	–	7	–	2
No. 8 Virginia Tech +	3	–	4	–	2	13	–	5	–	4
Duke	2	–	6	–	1	7	–	8	–	2
Pittsburgh	0	–	7	–	2	2	–	13	–	3
‡-2016 ACC Tournament champion + - Invited to the NCAA Division I Men's Soccer Championship; As of 13 December 2016; Rankings from NSCAA

The 2016 Wake Forest Demon Deacons men's soccer team represented Wake Forest University during the 2016 NCAA Division I men's soccer season. It was the 70th season of the university fielding a program. It was also the program's second season with Bobby Muuss as head coach. Muuss, the fourth head coach in program history, formerly coached Denver, and took over for Jay Vidovich, who left for a head coaching position with Portland Timbers 2.

== Roster ==
As of 2016: Note: Flags indicate national team as defined under FIFA eligibility rules; some limited exceptions apply. Players may hold more than one non-FIFA nationality.

No.	Pos.	Nation	Player
0	GK	USA	Alec Ferrell
1	GK	ESP	Andrew Cases Mundet
2	MF	USA	Luis Argudo
3	DF	USA	Rafael Fagundo
4	DF	USA	Kevin Politz
5	DF	TRI	Michael DeShields
6	DF	USA	Jared Odenbeck
7	MF	ESP	Jon Bakero
8	MF	USA	Jacori Hayes
9	FW	USA	Tater Rennhack
10	MF	BRA	Bruno Lapa
12	MF	USA	Brad Dunwell
13	MF	USA	Thomas Menke
14	MF	JAM	Joey DeZart

No.	Pos.	Nation	Player
15	MF	USA	Steven Echvarria
16	MF	USA	Ian Harkes
17	DF	USA	Logan Gdula
18	DF	USA	Alex Knox
19	DF	USA	Eddie Folds
20	MF	USA	Hunter Bandy
21	MF	USA	Hayden Partain
22	MF	GHA	Ema Twumasi
23	FW	USA	Hank Gauger
25	MF	USA	Ricky Greensfelder
26	DF	USA	Sam Raben
28	FW	NZL	Tane Gent
30	GK	USA	Grant Bishop
31	GK	USA	Kyle Barkett

== Schedule ==
Date Time, TV	Rank^{#}	Opponent^{#}	Result	Record	Site (Attendance) City, State
Preseason
08/14/2016*; 7:00 pm	No. 5	at Furman	T 0–0		Stone III Stadium; Greenville, SC
08/20/2016*; 7:00 pm	No. 5	UNC Wilmington	T 0–0		Spry Stadium; Winston-Salem, NC
Regular season
08/26/2016*; 7:00 pm, ACCN	No. 5	Saint Louis	L 0–1	0–1	Spry Stadium (1,277); Winston-Salem, NC
08/28/2016*; 7:30 pm	No. 5	Cal Poly	W 2–1	1–1	Spry Stadium (3,658); Winston-Salem, NC
09/03/2016*; 7:00 pm, ACCN	No. 21	Cleveland State	W 1–0	2–1	Spry Stadium (2,373); Winston-Salem, NC
09/06/2016*; 7:00 pm, ACCN	No. 21	Appalachian State	W 3–0	3–1	Spry Stadium (1,520); Winston-Salem, NC
09/10/2016; 7:00 pm, ACCN	No. 21	No. 17 Virginia	W 1–0 ^{OT}	4–1 (1–0)	Spry Stadium (3,275); Winston-Salem, NC
09/13/2016*; 7:00 pm, ACCN	No. 10	George Washington	T 0–0 ^{2OT}	4–1–1	Spry Stadium (1,437); Winston-Salem, NC
09/16/2016; 7:00 pm	No. 10	at Duke	W 2–0	5–1–1 (2–0)	Koskinen Stadium (1,054); Durham, NC
09/20/2016*; 7:00 pm	No. 10	FIU	W 2–0	6–1–1	Spry Stadium (1,094); Winston-Salem, NC
09/24/2016; 7:00 pm, ACCN	No. 10	NC State	W 1–0	7–1–1 (3–0)	Spry Stadium (3,366); Winston-Salem, NC
09/27/2016*; 7:00 pm, ACCN	No. 10	at Davidson	W 2–1	8–1–1	Alumni Soccer Stadium (776); Davidson, NC
09/30/2016; 7:00 pm, ACCN	No. 11	at No. 5 Clemson	L 0–1	8–2–1 (3–1)	Riggs Field (3,128); Clemson, SC
10/08/2016; 7:00 pm, ACCN	No. 11	at No. 1 Notre Dame	T 2–2 ^{2OT}	8–2–2 (3–1–1)	Alumni Field (1,586); South Bend, IN
10/11/2016*; 7:00 pm, ACCN	No. 6	Marshall	W 1–0	9–2–2	Spry Stadium (1,386); Winston-Salem, NC
10/15/2016; 7:00 pm, ACCN	No. 6	No. 2 Louisville	W 2–1	10–2–2 (4–1–1)	Spry Stadium (3,428); Winston-Salem, NC
10/18/2016; 7:00 pm, SECN	No. 2	at No. 21 South Carolina	W 1–0	11–2–2	Stone Stadium (3,121); Columbia, SC
10/22/2016; 7:00 pm, ACCN	No. 2	No. 18 Boston College	W 1–0	12–2–2 (5–1–1)	Spry Stadium (2,974); Winston-Salem, NC
10/28/2016; 7:00 pm, ACCN	No. 2	at No. 6 Syracuse	T 1–1 ^{2OT}	12–2–3 (5–1–2)	SU Soccer Stadium; Syracuse, NY
ACC Tournament
11/06/16; 1:00 pm, ACCN	No. 2	No. 20 Notre Dame; Quarterfinals	W 1–0	13–2–3	Spry Stadium (1,971); Winston-Salem, NC
11/09/16; 7:00 pm, ACCN	No. 2	No. 9 Louisville; Semifinals	W 2–1 ^{OT}	14–2–3	Spry Stadium (1,683); Winston-Salem, NC
11/12/16; 2:00 pm, ESPNU	No. 2	vs. No. 3 Clemson; Championship	W 3–1	15–2–3	MUSC Health Stadium (2,304); Charleston, SC
NCAA Tournament
11/20/16*; 1:00 pm, ACCN	No. 2	Coastal Carolina; Second Round	W 2–0	16–2–3	Spry Stadium (1,808); Winston-Salem, NC
11/27/16*; 5:00 pm, ACCN	No. 2	SIU Edwardsville; Third Round	W 2–1	17–2–3	Spry Stadium (1,942); Winston-Salem, NC
12/02/16*; 5:00 pm, ACCN	No. 2	No. 24 Virginia Tech; Quarterfinals	W 2–0	18–2–3	Spry Stadium (3,410); Winston-Salem, NC
12/09/16*; 7:00 pm	No. 2	vs. No. 4 Denver; College Cup – Semifinals	W 2–1 ^{OT}	19–2–3	BBVA Compass Stadium (6,056); Houston, TX
12/11/16*; 2:00 pm	No. 2	No. 5 Stanford; College Cup – Championship	T 0–0^{2OT} L 4–5 pen.	19–2–4	BBVA Compass Stadium (6,315); Houston, TX
*Non-conference game. ^{#}Rankings from United Soccer Coaches. (#) Tournament seedings in parentheses.

== Rankings ==
Ranking movements Legend: ██ Increase in ranking ██ Decrease in ranking
	Week													
Poll	Pre	1	2	3	4	5	6	7	8	9	10	11	12	Final
NSCAA	5	21	21	12	14	11	11	7	2	2	2	2	2	2

== See also ==
- Wake Forest Demon Deacons men's soccer
- 2016 Atlantic Coast Conference men's soccer season
- 2016 NCAA Division I men's soccer season
- 2016 ACC Men's Soccer Tournament
- 2016 NCAA Division I Men's Soccer Championship
