= 2016 Clemson Tigers men's soccer team =

American college soccer season

2016 Clemson Tigers men's soccer

ACC Tournament, Runners Up

NCAA Tournament, Quarterfinalists
- Conference: Atlantic Coast Conference
- U. Soc. Coaches poll: No. 5
- TopDrawerSoccer.com: No. 5
- Record: 14–4–5 (4–1–3 ACC)
- Head coach: Mike Noonan (7th season)
- Assistant coaches: Philip Jones (4th season); Camilo Rodriguez (1st season)
- Home stadium: Riggs Field

2016 ACC men's soccer standings
	Conf.					Overall
Team	W		L		T	W		L		T
Atlantic
No. 2 Wake Forest ‡	5	–	1	–	2	19	–	2	–	4
No. 6 Louisville +	5	–	2	–	1	14	–	6	–	2
No. 5 Clemson +	4	–	1	–	3	14	–	4	–	5
No. 11 Syracuse +	4	–	2	–	3	12	–	4	–	4
Boston College +	3	–	3	–	3	9	–	9	–	3
NC State	1	–	8	–	0	5	–	12	–	0
Coastal
No. 4 North Carolina +	5	–	1	–	2	14	–	3	–	4
No. 13 Virginia +	4	–	2	–	3	11	–	4	–	5
No. 14 Notre Dame +	4	–	3	–	2	12	–	7	–	2
No. 8 Virginia Tech +	3	–	4	–	2	13	–	5	–	4
Duke	2	–	6	–	1	7	–	8	–	2
Pittsburgh	0	–	7	–	2	2	–	13	–	3
‡-2016 ACC Tournament champion + - Invited to the NCAA Division I Men's Soccer Championship; As of 13 December 2016; Rankings from NSCAA

The 2016 Clemson Tigers men's soccer team represented Clemson University during the 2016 NCAA Division I men's soccer season. The Tigers were led by head coach Mike Noonan, in his seventh season. They played home games at Riggs Field. This was the team's 56th season playing organized men's college soccer and their 29th playing in the Atlantic Coast Conference.

== Roster ==
Updated 08/04/16

Note: Flags indicate national team as defined under FIFA eligibility rules; some limited exceptions apply. Players may hold more than one non-FIFA nationality.

No.	Pos.	Nation	Player
1	GK	(United States) USA	Michael Zierhoffer
2	DF	(United States) USA	Andrew Burnikel
3	DF	(Denmark) DEN	Patrick Bunk-Andersen
4	MF	(England) ENG	Oliver Shannon
5	DF	(Bermuda) BER	Mauriq Hill
6	MF	(United States) USA	Tanner Dieterich
7	MF	(Norway) NOR	Iman Mafi
8	MF	(United States) USA	Johnny Heckman
9	FW	(Costa Rica) CRC	Diego Campos
11	DF	(England) ENG	Aaron Jones
12	MF	(Costa Rica) CRC	Saul Chinchilla
13	MF	(United States) USA	Michael Melvin
14	MF	(United States) USA	Grayson Raynor
15	MF	(France) FRA	Alex Happi
16	MF	(Senegal) SEN	Malick Mbaye
17	MF	(Brazil) BRA	Thales Moreno

No.	Pos.	Nation	Player
18	MF	(United States) USA	Harrison Kurtz
19	FW	(United States) USA	Robby Jacobs
20	FW	(United States) USA	Austen Burnikel
21	DF	(United States) USA	Trey Langolis
22	GK	(United States) USA	Nolan Lennon
23	MF	(United States) USA	Michael Swift
24	GK	(United States) USA	Brady Allardice
25	DF	(United States) USA	Cale Thorne
26	DF	(United States) USA	Chris Heijjer
27	DF	(United States) USA	Kevin Fielden
28	DF	(United States) USA	Nate Hall
29	DF	(United States) USA	Robert Campbell
30	DF	(United States) USA	Jon Breed
31	GK	(Spain) ESP	Ximo Miralles
32	MF	(United States) USA	Philip Tran

== Draft picks ==
The Tigers had one player drafted in the 2017 MLS SuperDraft.

Player	Team	Round	Pick #	Position
(England) Aaron Jones	Philadelphia Union	2nd	33	DF

== Coaching staff ==
Position	Staff
Athletic director	(United States) Dan Radakovich
Head coach	(United States) Mike Noonan
Associate Head Coach	(England) Philip Jones
Assistant coach	(Colombia) Camilo Rodriguez
Director of Soccer Operations	(United States) Rohan Sachdev
Athletic trainer	(United States) Raz Razayeski
Strength and conditioning Coach	(United States) Rick Franzblau

== Schedule ==
Date Time, TV	Rank^{#}	Opponent^{#}	Result	Record	Site City, State
Exhibition
August 13*; 7:00 pm	No. 3	UAB	W 2–1 ^{2OT}	–	Riggs Field; Clemson, SC
August 16*; 7:00 pm	No. 3	High Point	T 1–1	–	Riggs Field; Clemson, SC
August 19*; 7:00 pm	No. 11	at Duke	T 2–2	–	Koskinen Stadium; Durham, NC
Regular season
August 26*; 7:00 pm	No. 3	at No. 24 South Carolina; Rivalry	W 2–1	1–0–0	Stone Stadium (2,892); Columbia, SC
August 28*; 6:30 pm	No. 3	Providence	W 2–1	2–0–0	Riggs Field (1,167); Clemson, SC
September 2*; 7:00 pm	No. 2	No. 8 Creighton	W 1–0	3–0–0	Riggs Field (2,869); Clemson, SC
September 9; 7:30 pm	No. 2	No. 3 North Carolina	L 0–1	3–1–0 (0–1–0)	Riggs Field (7,293); Clemson, SC
September 17; 7:00 pm	No. 6	at No. 17 Virginia	T 3-3 ^{2OT}	3–1–1 (0–1–1)	Klöckner Stadium (2,222); Charlottesville, VA
September 20*; 7:00 pm	No. 6	Gardner-Webb	W 5–0	4–1–1 (0–1–1)	Riggs Field (1,189); Clemson,SC
September 23; 7:00 pm	No. 7	at No. 19 Virginia Tech	W 2–1	5–1–1 (1–1–1)	Sandra D. Thompson Field (1,412); Blacksburg, VA
September 27*; 7:00 pm	No. 5	at South Florida	W 1–0 ^{OT}	6–1–1 (1–1–1)	USF Soccer Stadium (651); Tampa, FL
September 30; 7:00 pm	No. 5	No. 11 Wake Forest	W 1–0	7–1–1 (2–1–1)	Riggs Field (3,128); Clemson, SC
October 4*; 6:00 pm	No. 5	at Coastal Carolina	T 0–0 ^{2OT}	7–1–2 (2–1–1)	Coastal Carolina University Soccer Field (596); Conway, SC
October 8; 7:00 pm	No. 5	NC State	W 2–0	8–1–2 (3–1–1)	Riggs Field (4,112); Clemson, SC
October 11*; 7:00 pm	No. 3	No. 14 Charlotte	L 0–1	8–2–2 (3–1–1)	Riggs Field (1,015); Clemson, SC
October 14; 7:00 pm	No. 3	at Boston College; Rivalry	T 0–0 ^{2OT}	8–2–3 (3–1–2)	Newton Soccer Complex (1,035); Chestnut Hill, MA
October 16*; 12:30 pm	No. 3	at Brown	W 3–2	9–2–3 (3–1–2)	Stevenson Field (695); Providence, RI
October 21; 7:00 pm	No. 8	No. 6 Syracuse	T 0–0 ^{2OT}	9–2–4 (3–1–3)	Riggs Field (3,120); Clemson, SC
October 25*; 7:00 pm	No. 5	Georgia Southern; Senior Night	W 1–0	10–2–4 (3–1–3)	Riggs Field (2,538); Clemson, SC
October 28; 7:00 pm	No. 5	at No. 7 Louisville	W 1–0	11–2–4 (4–1–3)	Dr. Mark & Cindy Lynn Stadium (3,108); Louisville, KY
ACC Tournament
November 6; 1:00 pm	No. 4	No. 5 Syracuse; Quarterfinal	T 1–1 (4–2 PK) ^{2OT}	11–2–5	Riggs Field (1,068); Clemson, SC
November 9; 7:00 pm	No. 4	No. 8 Boston College; Semifinal	W 1–0	12–2–5	Riggs Field (1,546); Clemson, SC
November 13; 2:00 pm	No. 4	No. 2 Wake Forest; Final	L 1–0	12–3–5	MUSC Health Stadium (2,304); Clemson, SC
NCAA Tournament
November 17*	No. 3	South Carolina; Second Round	W 2–1 ^{OT}	13–3–5	Riggs Field (1,711); Clemson, SC
November 27*	No. 3	No. 14 Albany; Third Round	W 3–1	14–3–5	Riggs Field (2,046); Clemson, SC
December 2*	No. 3	No. 6 Denver; Quarterfinals	L 0–1	14–4–5	Riggs Field (4,101); Clemson, SC
*Non-conference game. ^{#}Rankings from United Soccer Coaches. (#) Tournament seedings in parentheses.

== Rankings ==
Ranking movement Legend: ██ Improvement in ranking. ██ Decrease in ranking. ██ Not ranked the previous week. RV=Others receiving votes.
Poll	Pre	Wk 1	Wk 2	Wk 3	Wk 4	Wk 5	Wk 6	Wk 7	Wk 8	Wk 9	Wk 10	Wk 11	Wk 12	Wk 13	Wk 14	Wk 15	Wk 16	Final
NSCAA	3	2	2	6	7	5	5	3	8	5	3	3	3	None Released				5
TopDrawer Soccer	10	8	8	5	6	5	6	4	4	4	4	3	3	4	4	5	5	5
