= 2016 Virginia Tech Hokies men's soccer team =

American college soccer season

2016 Virginia Tech Hokies men's soccer

Wolstein Classic Champions

NCAA Tournament, Quarterfinal
- Conference: Atlantic Coast Conference

Ranking
- Coaches: No. 8
- Record: 13–4–4 (3–4–2 ACC)
- Head coach: Mike Brizendine (8th season)
- Assistant coaches: Jeff Kinney (2nd season); Patrick McSorley (7th season)
- Home stadium: Sandra D. Thompson Field

2016 ACC men's soccer standings
| | Conf. | | | | | Overall |
| Team | W | | L | | T | W | | L | | T |
|---|---|---|---|---|---|---|---|---|---|---|
Atlantic
| No. 2 Wake Forest ‡ | 5 | – | 1 | – | 2 | 19 | – | 2 | – | 4 |
| No. 6 Louisville + | 5 | – | 2 | – | 1 | 14 | – | 6 | – | 2 |
| No. 5 Clemson + | 4 | – | 1 | – | 3 | 14 | – | 4 | – | 5 |
| No. 11 Syracuse + | 4 | – | 2 | – | 3 | 12 | – | 4 | – | 4 |
| Boston College + | 3 | – | 3 | – | 3 | 9 | – | 9 | – | 3 |
| NC State | 1 | – | 8 | – | 0 | 5 | – | 12 | – | 0 |
Coastal
| No. 4 North Carolina + | 5 | – | 1 | – | 2 | 14 | – | 3 | – | 4 |
| No. 13 Virginia + | 4 | – | 2 | – | 3 | 11 | – | 4 | – | 5 |
| No. 14 Notre Dame + | 4 | – | 3 | – | 2 | 12 | – | 7 | – | 2 |
| No. 8 Virginia Tech + | 3 | – | 4 | – | 2 | 13 | – | 5 | – | 4 |
| Duke | 2 | – | 6 | – | 1 | 7 | – | 8 | – | 2 |
| Pittsburgh | 0 | – | 7 | – | 2 | 2 | – | 13 | – | 3 |
‡-2016 ACC Tournament champion + - Invited to the NCAA Division I Men's Soccer Championship; As of 13 December 2016; Rankings from NSCAA

The 2016 Virginia Tech Hokies men's soccer team represented Virginia Tech during the 2016 NCAA Division I men's soccer season. It was the 45th season of the university fielding a program. The Hokies played their home fixtures at Sandra D. Thompson Field in Blacksburg, Virginia.

The 2016 season proved to be one of the program's most successful seasons. The Hokies were ranked for the first time since 2008, and earned their first NCAA Tournament berth since 2007. In the NCAA Tournament, the Hokies reached the quarterfinals before losing to fellow ACC outfit, Wake Forest.

== Schedule ==
| Date Time, TV | Rank^{#} | Opponent^{#} | Result | Record | Site (Attendance) City, State |
Preseason
| 08/16/2016*; 7:00 pm | | East Tennessee State | W 3–1 | | Thompson Field (227); Blacksburg, VA |
| 08/20/2016*; 7:00 pm | | at James Madison; Shenandoah Showdown | W 2–1 | | University Park (Not reported); Harrisonburg, VA |
Regular season
| 08/26/2016*; 7:00 pm | | at No. 18 Ohio State; Wolstein Classic | W 1–0 ^{2OT} | 1–0 | Owens Stadium (1,979); Columbus, OH |
| 08/28/2016*; 4:00 pm | | vs. Oakland; Wolstein Classic | W 3–0 | 2–0 | Owens Stadium (120); Columbus, OH |
| 09/02/2016*; 7:00 pm | | South Florida | W 4–1 | 3–0 | Thompson Field (879); Blacksburg, VA |
| 09/05/2016*; 1:00 pm | | at No. 24 Georgetown | W 1–0 | 4–0 | Shaw Field (1,149); Washington, DC |
| 09/09/2016; 7:00 pm, ACCN+ | No. 15 | at No. 1 Notre Dame | L 1–4 | 4–1 (0–1) | Alumni Stadium (1,824); South Bend, IN |
| 09/13/2016*; 7:00 pm, Hokievision | No. 23 | Longwood | W 1–0 | 5–1 | Thompson Field (367); Blacksburg, VA |
| 09/16/2016; 6:00 pm | No. 23 | NC State | W 3–0 | 6–1 (1–1) | Thompson Field (1,156); Blacksburg, VA |
| 09/20/2016*; 7:00 pm | No. 19 | at Delaware | W 2–0 | 7–1 | Grant Stadium (725); Newark, DE |
| 09/23/2016; 6:00 pm, ACCN+ | No. 19 | No. 7 Clemson | L 1–2 | 7–2 (1–2) | Thompson Field (1,412); Blacksburg, VA |
| 09/30/2016; 7:00 pm, ACCN+ | No. 18 | at Virginia; Commonwealth Cup | T 0–0 ^{2OT} | 7–2–1 (1–2–1) | Klöckner Stadium (1,989); Charlottesville, VA |
| 10/04/2016*; 6:00 pm, ACCN+ | No. 18 | VMI | W 7–1 | 8–2–1 | Thompson Field (623); Blacksburg, VA |
| 10/07/2016; 6:00 pm, ACCN+ | No. 18 | Duke | W 3–1 | 9–2–1 (2–2–1) | Thompson Field (193); Blacksburg, VA |
| 10/11/2016*; 6:00 pm, Hokievision | No. 15 | Wright State | T 1–1 ^{2OT} | 9–2–2 | Thompson Field (253); Blacksburg, VA |
| 10/14/2016; 7:00 pm, ACCN | No. 15 | at No. 10 Syracuse | L 0–1 | 9–3–2 (2–3–1) | SU Soccer Stadium (1,785); Syracuse, NY |
| 10/18/2016*; 6:00 pm, ACCN+ | No. 23 | No. 9 Charlotte | T 0–0 ^{2OT} | 9–3–3 | Thompson Field (223); Blacksburg, VA |
| 10/22/2016; 7:00 pm, ACCN+ | No. 23 | at No. 3 North Carolina | L 0–2 | 9–4–3 (2–4–1) | Fetzer Field (1,011); Chapel Hill, NC |
| 10/28/2016; 6:00 pm | No. 23 | Pittsburgh | W 2–1 | 10–4–3 (3–4–1) | Thompson Field (453); Blacksburg, VA |
ACC Tournament
| 11/02/2016*; 7:00 pm, ACCN+ | No. 23 (9) | at No. 25 (8) Boston College; First Round | T 2–2; L 2–4 pen. | 10–4–4 | Newton Soccer Complex (238); Chestnut Hill, MA |
NCAA Tournament
| 11/17/2016*; 6:00 pm, ESPN3 | | East Tennessee State; First Round | W 1–0 | 11–4–4 | Thompson Field (495); Blacksburg, VA |
| 11/20/2016*; 4:00 pm | | at No. 9 (10) Charlotte; Second Round | W 3–2 | 12–4–4 | Transamerica Field (1,023); Charlotte, NC |
| 11/27/2016*; 12:00 pm | | at No. 6 (7) Indiana; Third Round | W 2–1 ^{OT} | 13–4–4 | Armstrong Stadium (1,330); Bloomington, IN |
| 12/03/2016; 5:00 pm, ESPN3 | | at No. 2 (2) Wake Forest; Quarterfinals | L 0–2 | 13–5–4 | Spry Stadium (3,410); Winston-Salem, NC |

== See also ==
- Virginia Tech Hokies men's soccer
- 2016 Atlantic Coast Conference men's soccer season
- 2016 NCAA Division I men's soccer season
- 2016 ACC Men's Soccer Tournament
- 2016 NCAA Division I Men's Soccer Championship
