= 2016 North Carolina Tar Heels men's soccer team =

American college soccer season

2016 North Carolina Tar Heels men's soccer

Carolina Nike Classic Champions

NCAA Tournament, College Cup, L 0–0 (9–10 pen.) vs. Stanford
- Conference: Atlantic Coast Conference
- Record: 14–3–4 (5–1–2 ACC)
- Head coach: Carlos Somoano (5th season)
- Assistant coaches: Cristian Neagu (1st season); Grant Porter (5th season); Joe Scachetti (1st season)
- Home stadium: Fetzer Field

2016 ACC men's soccer standings
	Conf.					Overall
Team	W		L		T	W		L		T
Atlantic
No. 2 Wake Forest ‡	5	–	1	–	2	19	–	2	–	4
No. 6 Louisville +	5	–	2	–	1	14	–	6	–	2
No. 5 Clemson +	4	–	1	–	3	14	–	4	–	5
No. 11 Syracuse +	4	–	2	–	3	12	–	4	–	4
Boston College +	3	–	3	–	3	9	–	9	–	3
NC State	1	–	8	–	0	5	–	12	–	0
Coastal
No. 4 North Carolina +	5	–	1	–	2	14	–	3	–	4
No. 13 Virginia +	4	–	2	–	3	11	–	4	–	5
No. 14 Notre Dame +	4	–	3	–	2	12	–	7	–	2
No. 8 Virginia Tech +	3	–	4	–	2	13	–	5	–	4
Duke	2	–	6	–	1	7	–	8	–	2
Pittsburgh	0	–	7	–	2	2	–	13	–	3
‡-2016 ACC Tournament champion + - Invited to the NCAA Division I Men's Soccer Championship; As of 13 December 2016; Rankings from NSCAA

The 2016 North Carolina Tar Heels men's soccer team represented the University of North Carolina at Chapel Hill during the 2015 NCAA Division I men's soccer season. It was the 70th season of the university fielding a program.

== Schedule ==
Date Time, TV	Rank^{#}	Opponent^{#}	Result	Record	Site (Attendance) City, State
Preseason
08-12-2016*; 7:00 pm	No. 8	at Winthrop	W 1–0		Eagle Field (Not reported); Rock Hill, SC
08-15-2016*; 7:00 pm	No. 8	vs. South Carolina; Battle of the Carolinas	T 1–1		WakeMed Soccer Park (Not reported); Cary, NC
08-20-2016*; 7:00 pm	No. 8	at Davidson	W 3–0		Alumni Soccer Stadium (Not reported); Davidson, NC
Regular Season
08-26-2016*; 7:30 pm, ACCN+	No. 3	Cal Poly; Carolina Nike Classic	W 3–0	1–0	Fetzer Field (3,718); Chapel Hill, NC
08-28-2016*; 7:30 pm, ACCN+	No. 3	Saint Louis; Carolina Nike Classic	W 3–0	2–0	Fetzer Field (2,514); Chapel Hill, NC
09-02-2016*; 7:30 pm, ACCN+	No. 3	NC State; Carolina–State Game	Cancelled	2–0	Fetzer Field; Chapel Hill, NC
09-05-2016*; 7:30 pm, ACCN+	No. 3	VCU	W 3–2	3–0	Fetzer Field (1,736); Chapel Hill, NC
09-09-2016; 7:30 pm, ACCN+	No. 3	at No. 2 Clemson	W 1–0	4–0 (1–0)	Riggs Field (7,923); Clemson, SC
09-13-2016*; 7:00 pm, ACCN+	No. 2	East Tennessee State	L 0–1	4–1	Fetzer Field (410); Chapel Hill, NC
09-16-2016; 7:30 pm, ACCN+	No. 2	Pittsburgh	W 1–0	5–1 (2–0)	Fetzer Field (1,837); Chapel Hill, NC
09-20-2016*; 7:00 pm	No. 9	William & Mary	W 4–1	6–1	Albert–Daly Field (1,837); Williamsburg, VA
09-23-2016; 7:00 pm, ACCN+	No. 9	No. 25 Boston College	W 5–0	7–1 (3–0)	Fetzer Field (1,414); Chapel Hill, NC
09-30-2016; 7:00 pm, ACCN+	No. 4	at No. 3 Syracuse	T 0–0 ^{2OT}	7–1–1 (3–0–1)	SU Soccer Stadium (1,303); Syracuse, NY
10-04-2016*; 7:00 pm, ACCN+	No. 4	No. 20 UNC Wilmington	W 1–0	8–1–1	Fetzer Field (1,231); Chapel Hill, NC
10-07-2016; 5:00 pm, ACCN+	No. 4	No. 16 Virginia; South's Oldest Rivalry	L 1–2	8–2–1 (3–1–1)	Fetzer Field (237); Chapel Hill, NC
10-11-2016*; 7:00 pm, ACCN+	No. 8	UNC Asheville	W 7–0	9–2–1	Fetzer Field (402); Chapel Hill, NC
10-14-2016; 7:00 pm, ACCN+	No. 8	at Duke; Carlyle Cup	W 2–1	10–2–1 (4–1–1)	Koskinen Stadium (402); Durham, NC
10-18-2016*; 7:00 pm	No. 3	at Charleston	T 0–0 ^{2OT}	10–2–2	CofC Soccer Stadium (637); Mount Pleasant, SC
10-22-2016; 7:00 pm, ACCN+	No. 4	No. 23 Virginia Tech	W 2–0	11–2–2 (5–1–1)	Fetzer Field (1,011); Chapel Hill, NC
10-28-2016; 7:00 pm, ACCN+	No. 4	at No. 12 Notre Dame	T 0–0	11–2–3 (5–1–2)	Alumni Stadium (2,279); South Bend, IN
ACC Tournament
11-06-2016*; 7:00 pm, ACCN+	No. 10 (1)	at No. 25 (8) Boston College; Quarterfinals	L 0–1	11–3–3	Fetzer Field (1,210); Chapel Hill, NC
NCAA Tournament
11-20-2016*; 7:00 pm, ACCN+	No. 10 (9)	No. 20 Florida Gulf Coast; Second Round	W 3–2	12–3–3	Fetzer Field (1,210); Chapel Hill, NC
11-27-2016; 2:00 pm, Cuse.com	No. 10 (9)	at No. 8 (8) Syracuse; Third Round	W 1–0	13–3–3	David Murphy Field (720); Syracuse, NY
12-02-2016*; 7:00 pm, ESPN3	No. 10 (9)	No. 22 Providence; Quarterfinals	W 1–0 ^{2OT}	14–3–3	Fetzer Field (4,009); Chapel Hill, NC
12/09/16*; 8:45 pm, ESPNU	No. 8 (9)	vs. No. 5 (5) Stanford; College Cup – Semifinals	T 0–0; L 9–10 pen. ^{2OT}	14–3–4	BBVA Compass Stadium (6,056); Houston, TX
*Non-conference game. ^{#}Rankings from United Soccer Coaches. (#) Tournament seedings in parentheses.

== See also ==
- North Carolina Tar Heels men's soccer
- 2016 Atlantic Coast Conference men's soccer season
- 2016 NCAA Division I men's soccer season
- 2016 ACC Men's Soccer Tournament
- 2016 NCAA Division I Men's Soccer Championship
