= 2016 Syracuse Orange men's soccer team =

American college soccer season

2016 Syracuse Orange men's soccer

Central New York Classic champions

NCAA Tournament, Third round/Sweet 16
- Conference: Atlantic Coast Conference

Ranking
- Coaches: No. 7
- Record: 0–0–0 (0–0–0 ACC)
- Head coach: Ian McIntyre (4th season)
- Assistant coaches: Jukka Masalin (4th season); Matt Verni (3rd season); Blair Stevenson (1st season)
- Home stadium: SU Soccer Stadium

2016 ACC men's soccer standings
	Conf.					Overall
Team	W		L		T	W		L		T
Atlantic
No. 2 Wake Forest ‡	5	–	1	–	2	19	–	2	–	4
No. 6 Louisville +	5	–	2	–	1	14	–	6	–	2
No. 5 Clemson +	4	–	1	–	3	14	–	4	–	5
No. 11 Syracuse +	4	–	2	–	3	12	–	4	–	4
Boston College +	3	–	3	–	3	9	–	9	–	3
NC State	1	–	8	–	0	5	–	12	–	0
Coastal
No. 4 North Carolina +	5	–	1	–	2	14	–	3	–	4
No. 13 Virginia +	4	–	2	–	3	11	–	4	–	5
No. 14 Notre Dame +	4	–	3	–	2	12	–	7	–	2
No. 8 Virginia Tech +	3	–	4	–	2	13	–	5	–	4
Duke	2	–	6	–	1	7	–	8	–	2
Pittsburgh	0	–	7	–	2	2	–	13	–	3
‡-2016 ACC Tournament champion + - Invited to the NCAA Division I Men's Soccer Championship; As of 13 December 2016; Rankings from NSCAA

The 2016 Syracuse Orange men's soccer team represented Syracuse University during the 2016 NCAA Division I men's soccer season. It was the program's 93nd season. The #8 seeded Orange reached the third round/Sweet 16 of the 2016 NCAA Division I Men's Soccer Championship, where they lost to fellow ACC team, the 9th seeded North Carolina Tar Heels.

== Roster ==
=== Squad ===
This was the Syracuse roster for the 2016 season.

Note: Flags indicate national team as defined under FIFA eligibility rules; some limited exceptions apply. Players may hold more than one non-FIFA nationality.

No.	Pos.	Nation	Player
0	GK	USA	Austin Aviza
1	GK	USA	Pat Castle
2	DF	NOR	Oyvind Alseth
3	DF	SWE	Oscar Sewerin
4	MF	USA	Liam Callahan
5	DF	ENG	Lewis Cross
6	MF	FIN	Juuso Pasanen
7	FW	ENG	Ben Polk
8	MF	SWE	Jonathan Hagman
10	MF	GER	Julian Buescher
11	FW	BIH	Adnan Bakalović
12	FW	USA	Noah Rhynhart
13	DF	HON	Gabriel Menescal
14	FW	USA	Danny Apajee

No.	Pos.	Nation	Player
15	MF	USA	Korab Syla
16	MF	NOR	Andreas Jenssen
17	FW	CAN	Chris Nanco
18	MF	USA	Morgan Hackworth
19	DF	USA	Miles Robinson
20	DF	CAN	Kamal Miller
21	MF	USA	Chris Gomez
22	FW	USA	Kenny Lassiter
24	FW	USA	Jake Keller
25	GK	GER	Hendrik Hilpert
26	MF	USA	Trevor Alexander
28	DF	USA	Brandon Albert
29	DF	USA	Spencer Kopko

=== Coaching staff ===
Position	Staff
Athletic Director	(United States) John Wildhack
Head coach	(England) Ian McIntyre
Associate head coach	(Finland) Jukka Masalin
Asst. coach	(United States) Matt Verni
Volunteer Asst. coach	(United States) Blair Stevenson

Last updated: December 17, 2015
Source: Syracuse Soccer

== Schedule ==
Date Time, TV	Rank^{#}	Opponent^{#}	Result	Record	Site (Attendance) City, State
Exhibitions
08/13/16*; 7:00 pm	No. 6	New Hampshire	T 1–1		Ensley Athletic Center; Syracuse, NY
08/18/16*; 7:00 pm	No. 6	vs. Michigan State	T 2–2		Hefner Soccer Fields; Fort Wayne, IN
08/20/16*; 7:00 pm	No. 6	vs. No. 18 Ohio State	W 2–1		Hefner Soccer Fields; Fort Wayne, IN
Regular season
08/26/16*; 7:00 pm	No. 6	UMass; Central New York Classic	W 3–0	1–0–0	SU Soccer Stadium (1,709); Syracuse, NY
08/28/16*; 7:00 pm	No. 6	Loyola Marymount; Central New York Classic	W 2–1 ^{2OT}	2–0–0	SU Soccer Stadium (1,468); Syracuse, NY
09/01/16*; 7:00 pm	No. 6	Colgate; Rivalry	W 3–0	3–0–0	SU Soccer Stadium (1,540); Syracuse, NY
09/04/16*; 7:00 pm	No. 6	St. John's	W 3–2	4–0–0	SU Soccer Stadium (1,623); Syracuse, NY
09/09/16; 7:00 pm	No. 6	at NC State	W 2–0	5–0–0 (1–0–0)	Method Road (702); Raleigh, NC
09/13/16*; 7:00 pm	No. 5	Hofstra	W 1–0	6–0–0 (1–0–0)	SU Soccer Stadium (1,005); Syracuse, NY
09/16/16; 7:00 pm	No. 5	No. 15 Boston College	W 2–0	7–0–0 (2–0–0)	SU Soccer Stadium (2,132); Syracuse, NY
09/20/16*; 7:00 pm	No. 2	at Cornell	W 3–1	8–0–0 (2–0–0)	Berman Field (302); Ithaca, NY
09/23/16; 7:00 pm	No. 2	at No. 3 Notre Dame	L 1–2	8–1–0 (2–1–0)	Alumni Stadium (2,468); South Bend, IN
09/30/16; 7:00 pm	No. 3	No. 4 North Carolina	T 0–0 ^{2OT}	8–1–1 (2–1–1)	SU Soccer Stadium (1,303); Syracuse, NY
10/04/16*; 7:00 pm	No. 3	at Albany	L 1–2	8–2–1 (2–1–1)	Bob Ford Field (1,017); Albany, NY
10/07/16; 7:00 pm	No. 3	at No. 8 Louisville	L 0–1	8–3–1 (2–2–1)	Lynn Stadium (2,594); Louisville, KY
10/14/16; 7:00 pm	No. 10	No. 15 Virginia Tech	W 1–0	9–3–1 (3–2–1)	SU Soccer Stadium (1,785); Syracuse, NY
10/18/16*; 7:00 pm	No. 6	at Hartford	W 2–0	10–3–1 (3–2–1)	Al-Marzook Field (1,592); West Hartford, CT
10/21/16; 7:00 pm	No. 6	at No. 8 Clemson	T 0–0 ^{2OT}	10–3–2 (3–2–2)	Riggs Field (3,120); Clemson, SC
10/28/16; 7:00 pm	No. 6	No. 2 Wake Forest	T 1–1 ^{2OT}	10–3–3 (3–2–3)	SU Soccer Stadium (1,587); Syracuse, NY
ACC Tournament
11/02/16*; 7:00 pm	No. 7 (5 seed)	No. (12 seed) Pittsburgh; First round	W 4–0	11–3–3 (3–2–3)	SU Soccer Stadium (641); Syracuse, NY
11/06/16; 1:00 pm	No. 7 (5)	at No. 3 (4) Clemson; Quarterfinals	T 1–1 ^{2OT (2–4 PKs)}	11–3–4 (3–2–3)	Riggs Field (1,068); Clemson, SC
NCAA Tournament
11/20/16*; 12:00 pm	No. 8 (8)	Dartmouth; Second Round	W 3–0	12–3–4 (3–2–3)	SU Soccer Stadium (315); Syracuse, NY
11/27/16*; 2PM	No. 8 (8)	No. 10 (9) North Carolina; Third Round	L 0–1	12–4–4 (3–2–3)	SU Soccer Stadium (720); Syracuse, NY
*Non-conference game. ^{#}Rankings from United Soccer Coaches. (#) Tournament seedings in parentheses.

== MLS Draft ==
The following members of the 2016 Syracuse Orange men's soccer team were selected in the 2016 MLS SuperDraft.

Player	Round	Pick	Position	MLS club	Ref.			
Julian Büscher	1	11	MF		Ben Polk	1	20	F
