= 2016 Virginia Cavaliers men's soccer team =

American college soccer season

2016 Virginia Cavaliers men's soccer

NCAA Tournament, 3rd round
- Conference: Atlantic Coast Conference
- Record: 10–3–5 (4–2–3 ACC)
- Head coach: George Gelnovatch (21st season)
- Assistant coaches: Matt Chulis (11th season); Terry Boss (3rd season)
- Home stadium: Klöckner Stadium

2016 ACC men's soccer standings
	Conf.					Overall
Team	W		L		T	W		L		T
Atlantic
No. 2 Wake Forest ‡	5	–	1	–	2	19	–	2	–	4
No. 6 Louisville +	5	–	2	–	1	14	–	6	–	2
No. 5 Clemson +	4	–	1	–	3	14	–	4	–	5
No. 11 Syracuse +	4	–	2	–	3	12	–	4	–	4
Boston College +	3	–	3	–	3	9	–	9	–	3
NC State	1	–	8	–	0	5	–	12	–	0
Coastal
No. 4 North Carolina +	5	–	1	–	2	14	–	3	–	4
No. 13 Virginia +	4	–	2	–	3	11	–	4	–	5
No. 14 Notre Dame +	4	–	3	–	2	12	–	7	–	2
No. 8 Virginia Tech +	3	–	4	–	2	13	–	5	–	4
Duke	2	–	6	–	1	7	–	8	–	2
Pittsburgh	0	–	7	–	2	2	–	13	–	3
‡-2016 ACC Tournament champion + - Invited to the NCAA Division I Men's Soccer Championship; As of 13 December 2016; Rankings from NSCAA

The 2016 Virginia Cavaliers men's soccer team will be the college's 76th season of playing organized men's college soccer, and their 63rd season playing in the Atlantic Coast Conference.

== Schedule ==
Date Time, TV	Rank^{#}	Opponent^{#}	Result	Record	Site City, State
Preseason
08/13/16*; 7:00 pm	No. 17	Longwood	W 3–0		Klöckner Stadium; Charlottesville, VA
08/16/16*; 7:00 pm	No. 17	Liberty	W 4–2		Klöckner Stadium; Charlottesville, VA
08/19/16*; 7:00 pm	No. 17	No. 10 Georgetown	W 2–0		Klöckner Stadium; Charlottesville, VA
Regular Season
08/26/16*; 7:00 pm	No. 17	No. 21 Coastal Carolina	W 2–1	1–0	Klöckner Stadium (2,629); Charlottesville, VA
09/02/16*; 7:00 pm	No. 12	Xavier	T 1–1 ^{2OT}	1–0–1	Klöckner Stadium (1,684); Charlottesville, VA
09/05/16*; 7:00 pm	No. 12	at James Madison	W 3–1	2–0–1	University Park (1,317); Harrisonburg, VA
09/10/16; 7:00 pm	No. 17	at No. 21 Wake Forest	L 0–1 ^{OT}	2–1–1 (0–1)	Spry Stadium (3,275); Winston-Salem, NC
09/14/16*; 7:00 pm	No. 17	VCU; I-64 Derby	W 3–0	3–1–1	Klöckner Stadium (1,319); Charlottesville, VA
09/17/16; 7:00 pm	No. 17	No. 6 Clemson	T 3–3 ^{2OT}	3–1–2 (0–1–1)	Klöckner Stadium (2,222); Charlottesville, VA
09/24/16; 7:00 pm	No. 16	at No. 13 Louisville	L 1–6	3–2–2 (0–2–1)	Lynn Stadium (2,383); Louisville, KY
09/27/16*; 7:00 pm		Cornell	W 4–0	4–2–2	Klöckner Stadium (1,087); Charlottesville, VA
09/30/16; 7:00 pm		Virginia Tech; Commonwealth Cup	T 0–0 ^{2OT}	4–2–3 (0–2–2)	Klöckner Stadium (1,989); Charlottesville, VA
10/04/16*; 7:00 pm		Hofstra	W 1–0	5–2–3	Klöckner Stadium (1,060); Charlottesville, VA
10/07/16; 7:00 pm		at No. 4 North Carolina; South's Oldest Rivalry	W 2–1	6–2–3 (1–2–2)	Fetzer Field (237); Chapel Hill, NC
10/11/16*; 7:00 pm	No. 21	No. 25 Radford	T 0–0 ^{2OT}	6–2–4	Klöckner Stadium (1,029); Charlottesville, VA
10/14/16; 7:00 pm	No. 21	No. 2 Notre Dame	W 1–0	7–2–4 (2–2–2)	Klöckner Stadium (3,716); Charlottesville, VA
10/18/16*; 7:00 pm	No. 16	William & Mary	W 3–0	8–2–4	Klöckner Stadium (1,335); Charlottesville, VA
10/21/16; 7:00 pm	No. 16	at Pittsburgh	T 0–0 ^{2OT}	8–2–5 (2–2–3)	Ambrose Urbanic Field (325); Pittsburgh, PA
10/28/16; 7:00 pm	No. 17	Duke	W 1–0	9–2–5 (3–2–3)	Klöckner Stadium (2,593); Charlottesville, VA
ACC Tournament
11/02/16; 7:00 pm	No. 17	NC State; First Round	W 1–0	10–2–5	Klöckner Stadium (941); Charlottesville, VA
11/06/16; 1:00 pm	No. 17	at No. 9 Louisville; Quarterfinals	L 0–1	10–3–5	Lynn Stadium (1,290); Louisville, KY
NCAA Tournament
11/20/16*; 1:00 pm	No. 16 (12)	Vermont; Second Round	W 2–1 ^{2OT}	11–3–5	Klöckner Stadium (612); Charlottesville, VA
11/27/16*; 8:00 pm	No. 16 (12)	at No. 8 (5) Stanford; Third Round	L 0–1 ^{2OT}	11–4–5	Laird Q. Cagan Stadium (1,185); Stanford, CA
*Non-conference game. ^{#}Rankings from United Soccer Coaches. (#) Tournament seedings in parentheses.
