= 2016 Notre Dame Fighting Irish men's soccer team =

American college soccer season

2016 Notre Dame Fighting Irish men's soccer
- Conference: Atlantic Coast Conference

Ranking
- Coaches: No. 14
- Record: 12–7–2 (4–3–2 ACC)
- Head coach: Bobby Clark (16th season)
- Assistant coaches: B. J. Craig (9th season); Michael Casper (2nd season)
- Home stadium: Alumni Stadium

2016 ACC men's soccer standings
	Conf.					Overall
Team	W		L		T	W		L		T
Atlantic
No. 2 Wake Forest ‡	5	–	1	–	2	19	–	2	–	4
No. 6 Louisville +	5	–	2	–	1	14	–	6	–	2
No. 5 Clemson +	4	–	1	–	3	14	–	4	–	5
No. 11 Syracuse +	4	–	2	–	3	12	–	4	–	4
Boston College +	3	–	3	–	3	9	–	9	–	3
NC State	1	–	8	–	0	5	–	12	–	0
Coastal
No. 4 North Carolina +	5	–	1	–	2	14	–	3	–	4
No. 13 Virginia +	4	–	2	–	3	11	–	4	–	5
No. 14 Notre Dame +	4	–	3	–	2	12	–	7	–	2
No. 8 Virginia Tech +	3	–	4	–	2	13	–	5	–	4
Duke	2	–	6	–	1	7	–	8	–	2
Pittsburgh	0	–	7	–	2	2	–	13	–	3
‡-2016 ACC Tournament champion + - Invited to the NCAA Division I Men's Soccer Championship; As of 13 December 2016; Rankings from NSCAA

The 2016 Notre Dame Fighting Irish men's soccer team represented the University of Notre Dame during the 2016 NCAA Division I men's soccer season. It was the program's 40th season.

== Schedule ==
Date Time, TV	Rank^{#}	Opponent^{#}	Result	Record	Site City, State
Exhibition
August 14*; 8:00 p.m. ET	No. 9	at SIUE	T 0-0	—	Ralph Korte Stadium (467); Edwardsville, IL
August 17*; 8:00 p.m. ET	No. 9	at Bradley	L 0–1	—	Shea Stadium; Peoria, IL
August 22*; 5:00 p.m. ET	No. 9	Valparaiso	T 1–1	—	Alumni Stadium; Notre Dame, IN
Regular Season
August 26*	No. 9	UC Irvine; Mike Berticelli Memorial Tournament	W 4–0	1–0–0	Alumni Stadium; Notre Dame, IN
August 28*	No. 9	New Mexico; Mike Berticelli Memorial Tournament	W 1–0	2–0–0	Alumni Stadium; Notre Dame, IN
September 2*	No. 4	vs. No. 15 Stanford adidas/IU Credit Union Classic	W 2–1 ^{2OT}	3–0–0	Bill Armstrong Stadium; Bloomington, IN
September 4*	No. 4	vs. California adidas/IU Credit Union Classic	W 5–0	4–0–0	Bill Armstrong Stadium; Bloomington, IN
September 9	No. 1	No. 15 Virginia Tech	W 4–1	5–0–0 (1–0–0)	Alumni Stadium; Notre Dame, IN
September 13*	No. 1	No. 14 Connecticut	W 1–0 ^{2OT}	6–0–0	Alumni Stadium; Notre Dame, IN
September 16; 7:00 p.m. ET	No. 1	at Louisville	L 0–1	6–1–0 (1–1–0)	Lynn Stadium (4,043); Louisville, KY
September 23; 7:00 p.m. ET	No. 3	No. 2 Syracuse	W 2–1	7–1–0 (2–1–0)	Alumni Stadium (2,468); Notre Dame, IN
September 30; 7:00 p.m. ET	No. 2	at Pittsburgh	W 2–0	8–1–0 (3–1–0)	Ambrose Urbanic Field (842); Pittsburgh, PA
October 4*; 7:00 p.m. ET	No. 2	No. 6 Indiana	W 4–0	9–1–0	Alumni Stadium (1,811); Notre Dame, IN
October 8; 7:00 p.m. ET	No. 2	No. 11 Wake Forest	T 2–2 ^{2OT}	9–1–1 (3–1–1)	Alumni Stadium (1,586); Notre Dame, IN
October 11*; 7:00 p.m. ET	No. 1	at Michigan	W 2–0	10–1–1	U-M Soccer Stadium (1,152); Ann Arbor, MI
October 14; 7:00 p.m. ET	No. 2	at No. 21 Virginia	L 0–1	10–2–1 (3–2–1)	Klöckner Stadium (3,716); Charlottesville, VA
October 18*; 8:00 p.m. ET	No. 2	at Northwestern	L 1–2 ^{OT}	10–3–1	Toyota Park (644); Bridgeview, IL
October 21; 7:00 p.m. ET	No. 4	at Duke	L 1–2 ^{2OT}	10–4–1 (3–3–1)	Koskinen Stadium (1,364); Durham, NC
October 25*; 7:00 p.m. ET	No. 12	No. 13 Michigan State	L 0–1	10–5–1	Alumni Stadium (1,041); Notre Dame, IN
October 28; 7:00 p.m. ET	No. 12	No. 3 North Carolina	T 0–0 ^{2OT}	10–5–2 (3–3–2)	Alumni Stadium (2,279); Notre Dame, IN
ACC Tournament
November 3; 1:00 p.m. ET	(7) No. 16	(10) Duke; First round	W 3–2 ^{OT}	11–5–2	Alumni Stadium (134); Notre Dame, IN
November 6; 1:00 p.m. ET	(7) No. 16	at (2) No. 2 Wake Forest; Quarterfinals	L 0–1	11–6–2	Spry Stadium (1,971); Winston-Salem, NC
NCAA Tournament
November 20; 6:00 p.m. ET	(13) No. 15	No. 17 Loyola-Chicago; Second round	W 1–0	12–6–2	Alumni Stadium (378); Notre Dame, IN
November 27; 5:00 p.m. ET	(13) No. 15	at (4) No. 7 Louisville; Third round	L 1–3	12–7–2	Lynn Stadium (1,858); Louisville, KY
*Non-conference game. ^{#}Rankings from United Soccer Coaches. (#) Tournament seedings in parentheses.
