= 2016 NCAA Division I men's soccer tournament =

2016 NCAA men's soccer tournament
College Cup

Tournament details
- Country: United States
- Dates: November 17 – December 11, 2016
- Teams: 48

Final positions
- Champions: Stanford Cardinal
- Runners-up: Wake Forest Demon Deacons
- Semifinalists: Denver Pioneers; North Carolina Tar Heels

Tournament statistics
- Matches played: 47
- Goals scored: 121 (2.57 per match)
- Top goal scorer: Julian Gressel (4)

Awards
- Best player: Offensive: Ian Harkes; Defensive: Andrew Epstein
- All statistics correct as of December 3, 2016.

The 2016 NCAA Division I men's soccer tournament (also known as the 2016 College Cup) was the 58th annual single-elimination tournament to determine the national champion of NCAA Division I men's collegiate soccer. The first, second, third, and quarterfinal rounds were held at college campus sites across the United States during November and December 2016, with host sites determined by seeding and record. The four-team College Cup finals was played at BBVA Compass Stadium in Houston, Texas on December 9 and 11, 2016.

The Stanford Cardinal successfully defended their 2015 title. Stanford played the North Carolina Tar Heels to a scoreless draw in the semifinals before winning a penalty shootout, 10–9, to advance to the Championship game. The Cardinal then also tied the Wake Forest Demon Deacons, 0–0, in the final before claiming the back-to-back title with another penalty shootout victory, 5–4.

Stanford tied the NCAA record for the Lowest Goals-Against Average in the Tournament (Minimum 3 Games) of 0.00 by becoming the fourth team to not allow their opponents to score a goal in the tournament. The other three co-record-holders are the 1976 San Francisco Dons, the 1995 Wisconsin Badgers, and the 2009 Akron Zips.

== Qualification ==
All Division I men's soccer programs except for Grand Canyon, Incarnate Word, and UMass Lowell will be eligible to qualify for the tournament. Those three programs are ineligible because they are in transition from Division II to Division I. The tournament field remains fixed at 48 teams.

Of the 24 schools that had previously won the championship, 13 qualified for this year's tournament.

== Format ==
As in previous editions of the NCAA Division I Tournament, the tournament features 48 participants out of a possible field of 203 teams. Of the 48 berths, 24 are allocated to the 21 conference tournament champions and to the regular season winners of the Ivy League, Pac-12 Conference, and West Coast Conference, which do not have tournaments. The remaining 24 berths are supposed to be determined through an at-large process based upon the Ratings Percentage Index (RPI) of teams that did not automatically qualify.

The NCAA Selection Committee also names the top sixteen seeds for the tournament, with those teams receiving an automatic bye into the second round of the tournament. The remaining 32 teams play in a single-elimination match in the first round of the tournament for the right to play a seeded team in the second round.

Seeded teams
Seed	School	Conference	Record	Berth type	NSCAA Ranking	RPI Ranking
1	Maryland	Big Ten	18–0–2	Tournament Champion	1	1
2	Wake Forest	ACC	15–2–3	Tournament Champion	2	3
3	Clemson	ACC	13–3–4	At Large	3	2
4	Louisville	ACC	12–5–2	At Large	9	6
5	Stanford	PAC-12	11–3–4	Conference Champion	8	5
6	Denver	Summit	17–0–3	Tournament Champion	4	7
7	Indiana	Big Ten	11–1–7	At Large	7	15
8	Syracuse	ACC	11–4–3	At Large	6	9
9	North Carolina	ACC	11–3–3	At Large	10	10
10	Charlotte	C-USA	12–3–2	At Large	5	14
11	Washington	Pac-12	13–6–0	At Large	14	8
12	Virginia	ACC	10–3–5	At Large	17	20
13	Notre Dame	ACC	11–7–2	At Large	20	13
14	Albany	America East	12–5–2	Tournament Champion	RV	12
15	Butler	Big East	13–5–1	Tournament Champion	15	11
16	Kentucky	C-USA	11–4–3	At Large	19	18

== Schedule ==
2015 Quarterfinal sites (blue) and College Cup (red)

Round	Date
First round	November 17, 2016
Second round	November 20, 2016
Third round	November 26–27, 2016
Quarterfinals	December 2 − 4, 2016
College Cup: Semifinals	December 9, 2016
College Cup Final	December 11, 2016

== Bracket ==
=== Regional 1 ===
First round
Providence	2
Delaware	0
Creighton	3
Tulsa	0
South Florida	2(0)
Florida Gulf Coast ^{PK}	2(3)
Dartmouth ^{AET}	1
St. Francis Brooklyn	0

Second round
1	Maryland	4
Providence	5
Creighton	3
16	Kentucky	2
9	North Carolina ^{AET}	3
Florida Gulf Coast	2
Dartmouth	0
8	Syracuse	3

Third round
Providence	2
Creighton	1
9	North Carolina	1
8	Syracuse	0

Quarterfinals
Providence	0
9	North Carolina ^{AET}	1

=== Regional 2 ===
First round
CSUN	0
Pacific	1
Vermont	4
Rider	1
Loyola-Chicago	2
UIC	0
UCLA	4
Colgate	2

Second round
5	Stanford	2
Pacific	0
Vermont	1
12	Virginia ^{AET}	2
13	Notre Dame	1
Loyola-Chicago	0
UCLA	1
4	Louisville ^{AET}	2

Third round
5	Stanford ^{AET}	1
12	Virginia	0
13	Notre Dame	1
4	Louisville	3

Quarterfinals
5	Stanford	2
4	Louisville	0

=== Regional 3 ===
First round
South Carolina	1
Mercer	0
Boston College	1
Fordham	0
New Mexico ^{PK}	0(6)
Portland	0(5)
San Diego State	1(5)
UNLV ^{PK}	1(6)

Second round
3	Clemson ^{AET}	2
South Carolina	1
Boston College	0
14	Albany	3
11	Washington	4
New Mexico	1
UNLV	0
6	Denver	3

Third round
3	Clemson	3
14	Albany	1
11	Washington	1
6	Denver	2

Quarterfinals
3	Clemson	0
6	Denver	1

=== Regional 4 ===
First round
Akron	2
Villanova	0
Virginia Tech	1
East Tennessee State	0
Michigan State	1(8)
SIUE ^{PK}	1(9)
Coastal Carolina	2
Radford	1

Second round
7	Indiana	1
Akron	0
Virginia Tech	3
10	Charlotte	2
15	Butler	0(4)
SIUE ^{PK}	0(5)
Coastal Carolina	0
2	Wake Forest	2

Third round
7	Indiana	1
Virginia Tech ^{OT}	2
SIUE	1
2	Wake Forest	2

Quarterfinals
Virginia Tech	0
2	Wake Forest	2

=== 2016 College Cup ===
Semifinals; December 9 BBVA Compass Stadium; Houston, Texas
6	Denver	1
2	Wake Forest ^{2OT}	2
9	North Carolina	0(9)
5	Stanford ^{PK}	0(10)

Championship; December 11; BBVA Compass Stadium; Houston, Texas
2	Wake Forest	0(4)
5	Stanford ^{PK}	0(5)

== Results ==
=== First round ===
November 17, 2016	South Carolina	1–0	Mercer	Columbia, South Carolina
1:00pm EST	Walker 39'	Report Report		Stadium: Stone Stadium; Attendance: 336; Referee: Elvis Mahmutovic

November 17, 2016	Michigan State	1–1 (a.e.t.) (8–9 p)	SIU Edwardsville	East Lansing, Michigan
1:00pm EST	Marcantognini 40'	Report	McHugh 67'	Stadium: DeMartin Soccer Complex; Attendance: 559; Referee: Hilario Grajeda
	Penalties
	Sierakowski (penalty scored); Krolicki (penalty scored); Centala (penalty scored); Corrigan (penalty missed); Lewis (penalty scored); H. Barone (penalty scored); Beckett (penalty scored); Marcantognini (penalty scored); Scott (penalty scored); Pimlott (penalty missed); Sierakowski (penalty missed)		(penalty scored) McHugh; (penalty missed) Kendall-Moullin; (penalty scored) McLean; (penalty scored) Solawa; (penalty scored) Ledbetter; (penalty scored) D. Jambga; (penalty scored) Hinkson; (penalty scored) Gutierrez; (penalty scored) Ebbesen; (penalty missed) Christianson; (penalty scored) Ledbetter

November 17, 2016	Coastal Carolina	2–1	Radford	Conway, South Carolina
2:00pm EST	Einarsson 30'; Pierrot 30'	Report	Colmer 50'	Stadium: Coastal Carolina University Soccer Field; Attendance: 320; Referee: Howard Ash

November 17, 2016	Dartmouth	1–0 (a.e.t.)	St. Francis Brooklyn	Hanover, New Hampshire
5:00pm EST	Danilack 105'	Report		Stadium: Burnham Field; Attendance: 395; Referee: Jason Pelletier

November 17, 2016	Akron	2–0	Villanova	Akron, Ohio
5:00pm EST	Hinds 39', 73'	Report		Stadium: Cub Cadet Field; Attendance: 1,811; Referee: Chris Penso

November 17, 2016	Virginia Tech	1–0	East Tennessee State	Blacksburg, Virginia
6:00pm EST	Quashie 23'	Report		Stadium: Sandra D. Thompson Field; Attendance: 495; Referee: Brandon Marion

November 17, 2016	Boston College	1–0	Fordham	Chestnut Hill, Massachusetts
6:00pm EST	Lewis 82'	Report		Stadium: Newton Soccer Complex; Attendance: 422; Referee: Lou Labbadia

November 17, 2016	South Florida	2–2 (a.e.t.) (0–3 p)	Florida Gulf Coast	Tampa, Florida
7:00pm EST	Mfeka 44'; Epps 54'	Report	Ruiz 27'; Gavin 61'	Stadium: Corbett Stadium; Attendance: 936; Referee: Ted Unkel
	Penalties
	Rodriguez (penalty missed); Gomez (penalty missed); Bartman (penalty missed)		(penalty scored) Mohsin; (penalty missed) Roubos; (penalty scored) Jaime; (penalty scored) Ruiz

November 17, 2016	Vermont	4–1	Rider	Burlington, Vermont
7:00pm EST	Wright 24', 43', 90'; Lamanna 71'	Report	Herpreck 89'	Stadium: Virtue Field; Attendance: 2,058; Referee: Carlos Fernandes

November 17, 2016	Providence	2–0	Delaware	Providence, Rhode Island
7:00pm EST	Reardon 8'; Gressel 71'	Report Report		Stadium: Chapey Field at Anderson Stadium; Attendance: 2,057; Referee: Noel Cotterell

November 17, 2016	UCLA	4–2	Colgate	Los Angeles, California
8:00pm EST	Hernández 17'; Raygoza 26'; Danladi 33'; Poleo 89'	Report	Z. Pagani 22'; Scodari 38'	Stadium: Drake Stadium; Attendance: 623; Referee: Ricardo Salazar

November 17, 2016	Loyola-Chicago	2–0	UIC	Chicago, Illinois
8:00pm EST	Lasinski 60'; Engesser 89'	Report		Stadium: Loyola Soccer Park; Attendance: 1,023; Referee: Greg Dopka

November 17, 2016	Creighton	3–0	Tulsa	Omaha, Nebraska
8:00pm EST	LaGro 3'; Englis 6'; Lopez-Espin 68'	Report		Stadium: Morrison Stadium; Attendance: 1,404; Referee: Sorin Stoica

November 17, 2016	New Mexico	0–0 (a.e.t.) (6–5 p)	Portland	Albuquerque, New Mexico
9:00pm EST		Report		Stadium: UNM Soccer Complex; Attendance: 2,311; Referee: Mark Allatin
	Penalties
	Wehan (penalty scored); Gurule (penalty scored); Goss (penalty scored); Rochowski (penalty missed); Lawrence (penalty missed); Hansen (penalty missed); Herrera (penalty scored); Gleadle (penalty scored); Spangenberg (penalty scored)		(penalty scored) Ortiz; (penalty missed) Magana-Rivera; (penalty missed) Dixon; (penalty scored) Reaves; (penalty scored) Coffey; (penalty missed) Baez; (penalty scored) Michel; (penalty scored) Edwardson; (penalty missed) Zambrano

November 17, 2016	San Diego State	1–1 (a.e.t.) (5–6 p)	UNLV	San Diego, California
10:00pm EST	Vergara 47'	Report	A. Musovski 30'	Stadium: SDSU Sports Deck; Attendance: 1,468; Referee: Ian Anderson
	Penalties
	Sauers (penalty missed); Norris (penalty scored); Meefout (penalty scored); Van den Berg (penalty scored); Nicklaw (penalty missed); Pelaez (penalty scored); Kjellker (penalty scored); Sagno (penalty missed)		(penalty scored) D. Musovski; (penalty scored) Pitt; (penalty scored) Mehlich; (penalty missed) A. Musovski; (penalty missed) Drye; (penalty scored) Cooper; (penalty scored) Jackson; (penalty scored) Velazquez

November 17, 2016	Cal State Northridge	0–1	Pacific	Northridge, California
10:00pm EST		Report	Branche 77'	Stadium: Matador Soccer Field; Attendance: 1,122; Referee: Chris Calderon

=== Second round ===
November 20, 2016	#8 Syracuse	3–0	Dartmouth	Syracuse, New York
12:00pm EST	Nanco 7'; Carmago 24', 60'	Report		Stadium: SU Soccer Stadium; Attendance: 315; Referee: Robert Sibiga

November 20, 2016	#2 Wake Forest	2–0	Coastal Carolina	Winston-Salem, North Carolina
1:00pm EST	Hayes 21'; Argudo 62'	Report		Stadium: Spry Stadium; Attendance: 1,808; Referee: Mark Kadlecik

November 20, 2016	#7 Indiana	1–0	Akron	Bloomington, Indiana
1:00pm EST	McConnell 54'	Report		Stadium: Bill Armstrong Stadium; Attendance: 1,790; Referee: Shane Butler

November 20, 2016	#12 Virginia	2–1 (a.e.t.)	Vermont	Charlottesville, Virginia
1:00pm EST	Foss 76'; Aguilar 103'	Report	Barðdal 62'	Stadium: Klöckner Stadium; Attendance: 612; Referee: Peter Dhima

November 20, 2016	#14 Albany	3–0	Boston College	Albany, New York
1:00pm EST	Mattos 12'; Solabarrieta 28'; Pinheiro 83'	Report		Stadium: Bob Ford Field; Attendance: 366; Referee: Brian Dunn

November 20, 2016	#15 Butler	0–0 (a.e.t.) (4–5 p)	SIU Edwardsville	Indianapolis, Indiana
2:00pm EST		Report		Stadium: Butler Bowl; Attendance: 667; Referee: Dimitar Chavdarov
	Penalties
	Suddick (penalty scored); Timmer (penalty scored); Lehtinen (penalty missed); Ostrowski (penalty scored); Goldsmith (penalty scored); Charalambous (penalty missed)		(penalty scored) McHugh; (penalty scored) Kendall-Moullin; (penalty missed) McLean; (penalty scored) Solawa; (penalty scored) Ledbetter; (penalty scored) D. Jambga

November 20, 2016	#10 Charlotte	2–3	Virginia Tech	Charlotte, North Carolina
4:00pm EST	Bruce 19'; Bronico 83'	Report	Acuña 50' (pen.), 60'; Quashie 88'	Stadium: Transamerica Field; Attendance: 1,023; Referee: Mike Stutt

November 20, 2016	#16 Kentucky	2–3	Creighton	Lexington, Kentucky
4:30pm EST	Barajas 68'; Williams 89'	Report	Fox 9' (o.g.); Perez 32'; Sawaf 78'	Stadium: Wendell & Vickie Bell Soccer Complex; Attendance: 935; Referee: Kevin Terry Jr.

November 20, 2016	#4 Louisville	2–1 (a.e.t.)	UCLA	Louisville, Kentucky
5:00pm EST	Gayton 3'; Schmitt 94'	Report	Danladi 60'	Stadium: Lynn Stadium; Attendance: 1,018; Referee: Leland Grant

November 20, 2016	#1 Maryland	4–5	Providence	College Park, Maryland
5:00pm EST	Wild 6'; Sejdič 22', 51'; Williamson 54'	Report	Gressel 11', 70'; Sailor 71'; Kilday 75'; Serrano 82'	Stadium: Ludwig Field; Attendance: 3,804; Referee: Sergio Gonzalez

November 20, 2016	#3 Clemson	2–1 (a.e.t.)	South Carolina	Clemson, South Carolina
6:00pm EST	Happi 86', 93'	Report	Dieterich 73' (o.g.)	Stadium: Riggs Field; Attendance: 1,711; Referee: Nima Saghafi

November 20, 2016	#13 Notre Dame	1–0	Loyola-Chicago	Notre Dame, Indiana
6:00pm EST	Gallagher 79'	Report		Stadium: Alumni Stadium; Attendance: 378; Referee: Sorin Stoica

November 20, 2016	#6 Denver	3–0	UNLV	Denver, Colorado
7:00pm EST	DeVoss 56'; Underwood 70'; Ford 81'	Report		Stadium: Denver Soccer Stadium; Attendance: 1,070; Referee: Allen Chapman

November 20, 2016	#9 North Carolina	3–2 (a.e.t.)	Florida Gulf Coast	Chapel Hill, North Carolina
7:00pm EST	T. Hume 30', 105'; Bruening 86'	Report	Ferrer 11'; Ruiz 72' (pen.)	Stadium: Fetzer Field; Attendance: 636; Referee: David Erbacher

November 20, 2016	#5 Stanford	2–0	Pacific	Stanford, California
8:00pm EST	Langsdorf 37'; Hillard-Arce 70'	Report		Stadium: Laird Q. Cagan Stadium; Attendance: 1,403; Referee: Eric Ehrhardt

November 20, 2016	#11 Washington	4–1	New Mexico	Seattle, Washington
8:00pm EST	Schmidt 28'; Menzies 47'; Rice 57'; Blanchard 65'	Report	Khouri 22'	Stadium: Husky Soccer Stadium; Attendance: 874; Referee: Josh Wilkins

=== Third round ===
November 26, 2016	#6 Denver	2–1	#11 Washington	Denver, Colorado
7:00pm EST	Crosswait 25'; Shinyashiki 66'	Report	Wright 77' (pen.)	Stadium: CIBER Field; Attendance: 1,640; Referee: Nima Saghafi

November 26, 2016	Creighton	1–2	Providence	Omaha, Nebraska
7:00pm EST	Rydstrand 4'	Report	Gressel 21'; Griffin 83'	Stadium: Morrison Stadium; Attendance: 2,539; Referee: Landis Wiley

November 27, 2016	#7 Indiana	1–2 (a.e.t.)	Virginia Tech	Bloomington, Indiana
12:05pm EST	Lillard 77'	Report	Moyers 18'; White 98'	Stadium: Bill Armstrong Stadium; Attendance: 1,330; Referee: Sorin Stoica

November 27, 2016	#8 Syracuse	0–1	#9 North Carolina	Syracuse, New York
2:00pm EST		Report	Kelly 32'	Stadium: David W. Murphy Field (Note: Syracuse played their home match at David W. Murphy Field, on the campus Onondaga Community College, instead of their regular stadium SU Soccer Stadium, due to field conditions from snowy conditions.); Attendance: 720; Referee: Jan Halaska

November 27, 2016	#2 Wake Forest	2–1	SIU Edwardsville	Winston-Salem, North Carolina
5:00pm EST	Bakero 3', 72'	Report	Ledbetter 41'	Stadium: Spry Stadium; Attendance: 1,942; Referee: Carmen Serbio

November 27, 2016	#4 Louisville	3–1	#13 Notre Dame	Louisville, Kentucky
5:00pm EST	Thiaw 16'; Schmitt 71'; Dieye 90'	Report	Gallagher 54'	Stadium: Lynn Stadium; Attendance: 1,858; Referee: Hilario Grajeda

November 27, 2016	#3 Clemson	3–1	#14 Albany	Clemson, South Carolina
6:00pm EST	Au. Burnikel 45', 81'; Happi 84'	Report	Clark 47'	Stadium: Riggs Field; Attendance: 2,046; Referee: Mark Kadlecik

November 27, 2016	#5 Stanford	1–0 (a.e.t.)	#12 Virginia	Stanford, California
8:00pm EST	Langsdorf 106'	Report		Stadium: Laird Q. Cagan Stadium; Attendance: 1,185; Referee: Mark Allatin

=== Quarterfinals ===
December 2, 2016	#3 Clemson	0–1	#6 Denver	Clemson, South Carolina
7:00 pm EST		Report	Ford 89'	Stadium: Riggs Field; Attendance: 4,101; Referee: Robert Sibiga

December 2, 2016	#9 North Carolina	1–0 (a.e.t.)	Providence	Chapel Hill, North Carolina
7:00 pm EST	Murphy 102'	Report		Stadium: Fetzer Field; Attendance: 4,009; Referee: Mike Tutt

December 3, 2016	#2 Wake Forest	2–0	Virginia Tech	Winston-Salem, North Carolina
5:00 pm EST	Twumasi 79', 81'	Report		Stadium: Spry Stadium; Attendance: 3,410; Referee: Chris Penso

December 3, 2016	#4 Louisville	0–2	#5 Stanford	Louisville, Kentucky
7:00 pm EST		Report	Langsdorf 64'; Werner 79'	Stadium: Lynn Stadium; Attendance: 3,247; Referee: Anthony Vasali

=== College Cup ===
==== Semifinals ====
December 9, 2016	#2 Wake Forest	2–1 (a.e.t.)	#6 Denver	Houston, Texas
6:00pm EST	Bakero 7'; Harkes 102'	Report	Shinyashiki 17'	Stadium: BBVA Compass Stadium; Attendance: 6,056; Referee: John McCloskey

December 9, 2016	#5 Stanford	0–0 (a.e.t.) (10–9 p)	#9 North Carolina	Houston, Texas
8:45pm EST		Report		Stadium: BBVA Compass Stadium; Attendance: 6,056; Referee: Hilario Grajeda
	Penalties
	Beason (penalty scored); Langsdorf (penalty scored); Mosharrafa (penalty scored); Hilliard-Arce (penalty scored); Skundrich (penalty scored); Baird (penalty scored); Werner (penalty scored); Nana-Sinkam (penalty scored); Hyatt (penalty scored); Bashti (penalty scored)		(penalty scored) October; (penalty scored) Bruening; (penalty scored) Storm; (penalty scored) Pineda; (penalty scored) Lopez; (penalty scored) Murphy; (penalty scored) Kelly; (penalty scored) Skahan; (penalty scored) Winn; (penalty missed) Comsia

==== national championship ====
December 11, 2016	#2 Wake Forest	0–0 (a.e.t.) (4–5 p)	#5 Stanford	Houston, Texas
2:00pm EST	Harkes (penalty scored); Hayes (penalty scored); Lapa (penalty scored); Bakero (penalty scored); Partain (penalty missed); Dunwell (penalty missed)	Report	(penalty scored) Beason; (penalty scored) Langsdorf; (penalty scored) Mosharrafa; (penalty missed) Hilliard-Arce; (penalty scored) Baird; (penalty scored) Werner	Stadium: BBVA Compass Stadium; Attendance: 6,315; Referee: Mark Kadlecik

== Statistics ==
=== Goalscorers ===
4 goals

- (Germany) Julian Gressel — Providence

3 goals

- (France) Alex Happi — Clemson
- (United States) Foster Langsdorf — Stanford
- (Canada) Brian Wright — Vermont
- (Ghana) Nico Quashie — Virginia Tech
- (Spain) Jon Bakero — Wake Forest

2 goals

- (United States) Nick Hinds — Akron
- (United States) Austen Burnikel — Clemson
- (United States) Kortne Ford — Denver
- (Brazil) Andre Shinyashiki — Denver
- (Spain) Albert Ruiz — Florida Gulf Coast
- (United States) Tate Schmitt — Louisville
- (Bosnia and Herzegovina) Amar Sejdič — Maryland
- (United States) Tucker Hume — North Carolina
- (Republic of Ireland) Jon Gallagher — Notre Dame
- (Colombia) Sergio Camargo — Syracuse
- (Ghana) Abu Danladi — UCLA
- (Costa Rica) Marcelo Acuña — Virginia Tech
- (Ghana) Ema Twumasi — Wake Forest

1 goal

- (Puerto Rico) Carlos Clark — Albany
- (Brazil) Bernardo Mattos — Albany
- (Brazil) Afonso Pinheiro — Albany
- (Chile) Nicolás Solabarrieta — Albany
- (Bermuda) Zeiko Lewis — Boston College
- (United States) Brandt Bronico — Charlotte
- (England) Daniel Bruce — Charlotte
- (Iceland) Einar Einarsson — Coastal Carolina
- (Haiti) Frantzdy Pierrot — Coastal Carolina
- (United States) Zach Pagani — Colgate
- (United States) Bruno Scodari — Colgate
- (United States) Myles Englis — Creighton
- (United States) Mitch LaGro — Creighton
- (United States) Ricky Lopez-Espin — Creighton
- (Mexico) Ricardo Perez — Creighton
- (Sweden) Joel Rydstrand — Creighton
- (United States) Karim Sawaf — Creighton
- (United States) Matt Danilack — Dartmouth
- (United States) Chandler Crosswait — Denver
- (United States) Scott DeVoss — Denver
- (United States) Alex Underwood — Denver
- (Spain) Robert Ferrer — Florida Gulf Coast
- (United States) Justin Gavin — Florida Gulf Coast
- (United States) Grant Lillard — Indiana
- (United States) Billy McConnell — Indiana
- (United States) Kevin Barajas — Kentucky
- (United States) J. J. Williams — Kentucky
- (Senegal) Cherif Dieye — Louisville
- (United States) Jack Gayton — Louisville
- (Senegal) Mohamed Thiaw — Louisville
- (United States) Kevin Engesser — Loyola-Chicago
- (United States) Alec Lasinski — Loyola-Chicago
- (Germany) Gordon Wild — Maryland
- (United States) Eryk Williamson — Maryland
- (Canada) Michael Marcantognini — Michigan State
- (United States) Patrick Khouri — New Mexico
- (Germany) Nils Bruening — North Carolina
- (United States) Jeremy Kelly — North Carolina
- (United States) Drew Murphy — North Carolina
- (United States) Tariq Branche — Pacific
- (United States) Danny Griffin — Providence
- (United States) Steven Kilday — Providence
- (United States) Brendan Reardon — Providence
- (United States) Nick Sailor — Providence
- (Portugal) João Serrano — Providence
- (England) Fraser Colmer — Radford
- (France) Arthur Herpreck — Rider
- (United States) A. J. Vergara — San Diego State
- (United States) Tomas Hilliard-Arce — Stanford
- (United States) Sam Werner — Stanford
- (United States) Austin Ledbetter — SIU Edwardsville
- (United States) Keegan McHugh — SIU Edwardsville
- (United States) Kevin Walker — South Carolina
- (United States) Marcus Epps — South Florida
- (South Africa) Lindo Mfeka — South Florida
- (Canada) Chris Nanco — Syracuse
- (Mexico) José Hernández — UCLA
- (United States) Kike Poleo — UCLA
- (United States) Willie Raygoza — UCLA
- (United States) Adam Musovski — UNLV
- (Iceland) Jon Arnar Barðdal — Vermont
- (Canada) Stefan Lamanna — Vermont
- (Guatemala) Pablo Aguilar — Virginia
- (United States) Paddy Foss — Virginia
- (United States) Brendan Moyers — Virginia Tech
- (United States) Forrest White — Virginia Tech
- (Spain) Luis Argudo — Wake Forest
- (United States) Ian Harkes — Wake Forest
- (United States) Jacori Hayes — Wake Forest
- (United States) Beau Blanchard — Washington
- (Canada) Scott Menzies — Washington
- (United States) Elijah Rice — Washington
- (United States) Justin Schmidt — Washington
- (United States) Steven Wright — Washington

Own goals

- (United States) Tanner Dieterich — Clemson (playing against South Carolina)
- (United States) Kaelon Fox — Kentucky (playing against Creighton)

== See also ==
- NCAA Men's Soccer Championships (Division II, Division III)
- NCAA Women's Soccer Championships (Division I, Division II, Division III)
