= Joey DeZart =

Jamaican footballer (born 1998)

Personal information
- Full name: Joseph DeZart II
- Date of birth: June 9, 1998 (age 28)
- Place of birth: Jackson, New Jersey, U.S.
- Height: 1.85 m (6 ft 1 in)
- Position: Midfielder

Youth career
- 2015–2016: Philadelphia Union

College career
Years	Team	Apps	(Gls)
2016–2019	Wake Forest Demon Deacons	65	(2)

Senior career*
Years	Team	Apps	(Gls)
2017–2018	Reading United	2	(0)
2019	North Carolina Fusion U23	10	(0)
2020–2022	Orlando City B	9	(0)
2020–2022	Orlando City	29	(0)
2023	Huntsville City	23	(0)
2024	Tampa Bay Rowdies	4	(0)
2024	Miami FC	12	(0)
2025–2026	DFK Dainava	9	(0)

International career^{‡}
2016	Jamaica U20	3	(0)
- * Club domestic league appearances and goals as of 10 November, 2025 ‡ National team caps and goals as of June 19, 2016

Joseph DeZart II (born June 9, 1998) is a professional footballer who most recently played as a midfielder for TOPLYGA club DFK Dainava. Born in the United States, he represented the Jamaica national under-20 team.

== Early life ==
Born in Jackson Township, New Jersey, DeZart started his prep career at Jackson Memorial High School, playing his freshman year with the school's men's soccer team before transferring to YSC Academy in Wayne, Pennsylvania, for his junior and senior seasons. A member of the Philadelphia Union Academy, he played with the Union U16s and made it to the USSDA finals. He also competed in the Generation Adidas Cup.

=== Wake Forest Demon Deacons ===
DeZart played four years of college soccer at Wake Forest University between 2016 and 2019, making 65 appearances for their men's soccer team. After only featuring in three games as a freshman, DeZart played over 1,000 minutes in each of the following three seasons including when the team earned its first No. 1 national ranking in program history in 2017 and reached the 2019 College Cup semifinal. DeZart ended his college career with two goals, four assists, three ACC regular season titles and two ACC tournament wins.

While at college, DeZart also played for USL League Two sides Reading United and North Carolina Fusion U23.

== Club career ==
=== Orlando City ===
DeZart was selected in the second round (31st overall) of the 2020 MLS SuperDraft by Orlando City. On February 21, 2020, DeZart signed a contract with Orlando following preseason. On July 25, 2020, he made his professional debut as an 83rd-minute substitute in a 1–0 victory over Montreal Impact during the MLS is Back Tournament round of 16. The club declined DeZart's contract option as part of the end of season roster moves on November 14, 2022.

=== Miami FC ===
On August 10, 2024, DeZart joined Miami FC of the USL Championship on a transfer from the Tampa Bay Rowdies.

== International ==
In 2016, DeZart was called into the Jamaica U20 training camp and appeared for the team during 2017 CONCACAF U20 Championship qualifying in June 2016 as the team failed to advance from the first round.

== Career statistics ==
=== College ===
School	Season	Division	Apps	Goals
Wake Forest Demon Deacons	2016	Div. I	3	0
Wake Forest Demon Deacons	2017	Div. I	19	0
Wake Forest Demon Deacons	2018	Div. I	21	1
Wake Forest Demon Deacons	2019	Div. I	22	1
Career total			65	2

=== Club ===
As of October 16, 2022

Club	Season	League			National cup		Playoffs		Other		Total	
Club	Season	Division	Apps	Goals	Apps	Goals	Apps	Goals	Apps	Goals	Apps	Goals
Orlando City B	2020	USL League One	2	0	—		—		—		2	0
Orlando City B	2022	MLS Next Pro	7	0	—		—		—		7	0
Orlando City B	Total		9	0	0	0	0	0	0	0	9	0
Orlando City	2020	Major League Soccer	11	0	—		0	0	1 (Note: MLS is Back Tournament knockout stage.)	0	12	0
Orlando City	2021	Major League Soccer	17	0	0	0	0	0	—		17	0
Orlando City	2022	Major League Soccer	1	0	0	0	0	0	—		1	0
Orlando City	Total		29	0	0	0	0	0	1	0	30	0
Career total			38	0	0	0	0	0	1	0	39	0

== Honours ==
Wake Forest Demon Deacons

- Atlantic Coast Conference regular season: 2016, 2017, 2018
- ACC Men's Soccer Tournament: 2016, 2017
- NCAA College Cup runner-up: 2016

Orlando City

- U.S. Open Cup: 2022
