= Ken Lolla =

American soccer player-coach

Personal information
- Full name: Ken Lolla
- Date of birth: c. 1961 (age 64–65)
- Place of birth: Belmar, New Jersey, United States
- Position: Midfielder

Youth career
- –1980: St. Rose Purple Roses

College career
Years	Team	Apps	(Gls)
1980–1983	Duke Blue Devils		

Senior career*
Years	Team	Apps	(Gls)
1984	Charlotte Gold		
1984–1988	Canton Invaders (indoor)		
1988	New Jersey Eagles		
1990	Penn-Jersey Spirit		

Managerial career
- 1984: Monmouth Hawks (assistant)
- 1985: Duke Blue Devils (assistant)
- 1987: Lake High School
- 1988–1989: Duke Blue Devils (assistant)
- 1990–1992: Belmont Abbey Crusaders
- 1993–2005: Akron Zips
- 2006–2018: Louisville Cardinals
- * Club domestic league appearances and goals

Ken Lolla is a soccer coach who was formerly head men's soccer coach at the University of Louisville. He is also a writer and professional speaker. Lolla played collegiate soccer at Duke University and professionally at various US professional soccer teams. He has earned several accolades as both a player and coach.

== Player ==
Lolla attended St. Rose High School in Belmar, New Jersey where he was a 1980 High School All-American; he also played on the U.S. Olympic Sports Festival teams in 1979 and 1983. Lolla went on to play collegiate soccer at Duke University from 1980 to 1983 where he was a three-time all-conference selection of the Atlantic Coast Conference and earned All-South and All-America in 1981 and 1983. He graduated in 1983 with a degree in biology.

He was selected in the fourth round of the North American Soccer League draft by the Tampa Bay Rowdies. Lolla played professional soccer for the Charlotte Gold of the United Soccer League. He also played for the Canton Invaders of the National Professional Soccer League from 1984 to 1988. He also served as the Youth Development Director for the Canton Invaders in 1985 and 1986. He handled community and public relations in 1987 and 1988 in conjunction with appearances as a player for the NPSL franchise. In the Spring 1988, he moved to the New Jersey Eagles of the American Professional Soccer League. In 1990, he played for the Penn-Jersey Spirit, but he left the team on June 14, 1990, when he was hired as head coach of Belmont Abbey College. In 2002, Lolla was one of 55 players named to the ACC's 50th Anniversary Men's Soccer Team.

== Coach ==
Lolla began coaching during his playing career when he served as an assistant at Monmouth University in 1984. In 1985, he spent time as an assistant coach with his alma mater, Duke, then served as the head coach at Lake High School in Uniontown, Ohio in 1987. He returned as an assistant coach with Duke in 1988 and 1989. In 1993, he became the head coach of Belmont Abbey College an NCAA Division II soccer team. In his three seasons as head coach, he compiled a 49–16–3 record and the team won three consecutive Carolinas Conference Championships. Lolla was named the Carolinas Conference Coach of the Year in 1990 and NSCAA-NAIA National Coach of the Year in 1992.

For the next thirteen years Lolla went on to coach the Akron Zips where he was the winningest coach in school history compiling a 160–68–25 record along with eight Mid-American Conference Championships and a school record five straight NCAA Tournament appearances. Lolla coached 38 first team All-MAC players while at Akron and was named MAC coach of the year three times. Coach Lolla is a member of the Akron Hall of Fame.

On December 16, 2005, University of Louisville announced it had hired Lolla as the school's new head coach. In his second season at Louisville, the Cardinals finished 11–7–4 with an appearance in the NCAA Tournament's second round, where they lost to eventual National runner up Ohio State University. In the past five seasons, Coach Lolla has taken University of Louisville from a losing program to the 2010 NCAA College Cup Final, 2010 Big East Conference Championship, No. 1 national ranking, and 20–1–3 record. Lolla was named the 2010 National Coach of the Year and his staff was named the 2010 Big East Coaching Staff of the Year. In Fall 1999, he was appointed head coach of the U.S. Soccer Federation Under-15 National Team. After the 2018 season, Lolla resigned after 13 years and a 155–77–39 record with the team.

== Personal ==
Ken, his wife Tina, and their three children reside in Louisville, Kentucky.
