= Sean Teepen =

American soccer player (born 1991)

Personal information
- Date of birth: May 2, 1991 (age 35)
- Place of birth: Cincinnati, Ohio, United States
- Height: 6 ft 4 in (1.93 m)
- Position: Goalkeeper

College career
Years	Team	Apps	(Gls)
2009–2012	Charleston Golden Eagles		

Senior career*
Years	Team	Apps	(Gls)
2011	West Virginia Chaos	10	(0)
2012	Michigan Bucks	8	(0)
2013	Dayton Dutch Lions	1	(0)
2014	West Virginia Chaos	3	(0)

Managerial career
- 2012: Oakland Golden Grizzlies (assistant)
- 2013–2015: Charleston Golden Eagles (women's assistant)
- 2014: Walnut Hills Eagles (assistant)
- 2014–2015: West Virginia Chaos (assistant)
- 2015: Butler Bulldogs (assistant)
- 2016: Coastal Carolina Chanticleers (assistant)
- 2016–2017: Myrtle Beach Mutiny (assistant)
- 2017: Oregon State Beavers (assistant)
- 2018–2019: Bowling Green Falcons (assistant)
- 2020–2022: Bowling Green Falcons (associate HC)
- 2022–2025: Louisville Cardinals (assistant)
- * Club domestic league appearances and goals

Sean Teepen (born May 2, 1991) is an American retired soccer player and coach.

== Career ==
=== Youth and amateur ===
Teepen played college soccer at the University of Charleston between 2009 and 2012, where he also appeared for USL PDL club's West Virginia Chaos in 2011 and Michigan Bucks in 2012.

=== Professional ===
Teepen signed with USL Professional Division club Dayton Dutch Lions on July 3, 2013.
