= University Park (James Madison University) =

Coordinates: 38°25′23″N 78°52′1″W

The James Madison University Park is home to both Athletics (along the Neff side) and University Recreation (entrance is on Devon Lane).

Lacrosse/Soccer Complex is a soccer and lacrosse stadium located off of Neff Avenue in Harrisonburg, Virginia on the campus of James Madison University. The complex is home to the men's and women's soccer teams, as well as men's and women's lacrosse teams.

The soccer teams moved to University Park in 2012.
