= Bobby Muuss =

American college soccer coach

Current position
- Title: Head coach
- Team: Wake Forest Demon Deacons

Biographical details
- Born: January 13, 1976 (age 50); East Islip, New York
- Education: Southern Connecticut

Playing career
- 1995: Southern Connecticut

Coaching career (HC unless noted)
- 1997–2000: Connecticut (assistant)
- 2001–2006: Wake Forest (assistant)
- 2007–2014: Denver
- 2015–: Wake Forest

Bobby Muuss is an American college soccer coach, currently serving as head coach of the Wake Forest Demon Deacons men's soccer team.

== Career ==
He played college soccer at Southern Connecticut State.

He was an assistant coach at the University of Connecticut, helping UConn win the 2000 NCAA Championship.

After being an assistant coach at Wake Forest from 2001 to 2006, Muuss was hired to be the head coach at Denver in January 2007. In 2007, Muuss was named Mountain Pacific Sports Federation co-coach of the year, and was named the 2008 MPSF coach of the year. In 2008, Muuss lead Denver to its first-ever MPSF championship and its first NCAA Tournament appearance since 1970. In 2013, Denver's first year in the Summit League, Muuss guided the team to a 6–0–0 record in conference play and was named Summit League coach of the year.

Muuss was hired to be the head coach at Wake Forest in January 2015. In 2015, Muuss lead Wake Forest to a consensus No.1 ranking in the national polls and a number one seed in the 2015 NCAA Tournament. He was named the 2015 ACC coach of the year, becoming the fourth coach to win the award in his first year with a program.
