= Patrick Bunk-Andersen =

Danish footballer (born 1995)

Personal information
- Date of birth: 13 January 1995 (age 31)
- Place of birth: Copenhagen, Denmark
- Height: 1.88 m (6 ft 2 in)
- Position: Defender

Youth career
- Hvidovre IF

College career
Years	Team	Apps	(Gls)
2015–2018	Clemson Tigers	82	(4)

Senior career*
Years	Team	Apps	(Gls)
2014–2015	Hvidovre IF	0	(0)
2015	Skovshoved IF	0	(0)
2019	Toronto FC II	28	(5)
2020	Pittsburgh Riverhounds	7	(0)
2021	Hillerød	22	(1)
- * Club domestic league appearances and goals as of 7 June 2022

Patrick Bunk-Andersen (born 13 January 1995) is a Danish footballer who plays as a defender.

== Career ==
=== Youth, college and amateur ===
Bunk-Anderson played for club Hvidovre IF in his home country of Denmark. After finishing secondary school in Denmark, Bunk-Anderson used a program that matches Scandinavian athletes with US Colleges to find Clemson University. Bunk-Anderson would go on to make 82 appearances for the Tigers and score 4 goals in his four years at Clemson. In 2015, his freshman year, he was named to TopDrawerSoccer's all Freshman Team. He was named captain of the squad in 2018.

=== Professional ===
Bunk-Andersen was drafted in the third round, 64th overall, of the 2019 MLS SuperDraft by Toronto FC. He was signed by Toronto FC II on 13 March 2019. Bunk-Andersen made his debut for the club on 5 April 2019, when he started as a defender in a game against Orlando City B.

Bunk-Andersen scored his first career professional goal on 12 May 2019 in a game against Tormenta FC.
