= Jacori Hayes =

American soccer player (born 1995)

Personal information
- Date of birth: June 29, 1995 (age 31)
- Place of birth: Andrews Field, Maryland, United States
- Height: 5 ft 8 in (1.73 m)
- Position: Midfielder

Youth career
- 2008–2013: Baltimore Bays

College career
Years	Team	Apps	(Gls)
2013–2016	Wake Forest Demon Deacons	81	(15)

Senior career*
Years	Team	Apps	(Gls)
2014	Portland Timbers U23s	7	(0)
2015	D.C. United U-23	9	(4)
2017–2019	FC Dallas	38	(1)
2017	→ Tulsa Roughnecks (loan)	8	(1)
2019	→ North Texas SC	4	(0)
2020–2022	Minnesota United	34	(1)
2022	→ Minnesota United 2 (loan)	4	(0)
2023	San Antonio FC	28	(0)
2024	North Carolina FC	14	(0)
- * Club domestic league appearances and goals as of November 13, 2024

Jacori Hayes (born June 29, 1995) is an American professional soccer player. Hayes is typically deployed as a central midfielder.

== Career ==
=== College ===
Hayes grew up in Prince George's County, Maryland. He was a four-year starter for the Wake Forest Demon Deacons. At Wake Forest, he made 84 appearances, scoring 15 goals and picking up 15 assists.

=== Professional ===
Hayes was selected by FC Dallas in the first round of the 2017 MLS SuperDraft on January 13, 2017. He made his professional debut in FCD's match against Sporting Kansas City on March 11, 2017.

On April 14, 2018, Hayes scored his first MLS goal against New England Revolution.

Hayes was traded to Minnesota United on January 21, 2020, in exchange for a third-round MLS SuperDraft pick. Following the 2022 season, his contract option was declined by Minnesota.

On March 7, 2023, Hayes signed with USL Championship side San Antonio FC ahead of their 2023 season.

Hayes joined North Carolina FC on December 18, 2023, ahead of the club's return to the USL Championship.

== Honors ==
Wake Forest

- ACC Tournament Championship: 2016

Individual

- All-ACC Freshman Team: 2013
- All-ACC First Team: 2015, 2016
- NSCAA All-South Region Second Team: 2015, 2016
- All-ACC Tournament Team: 2015, 2016
