= SU Soccer Stadium =

Soccer-specific stadium

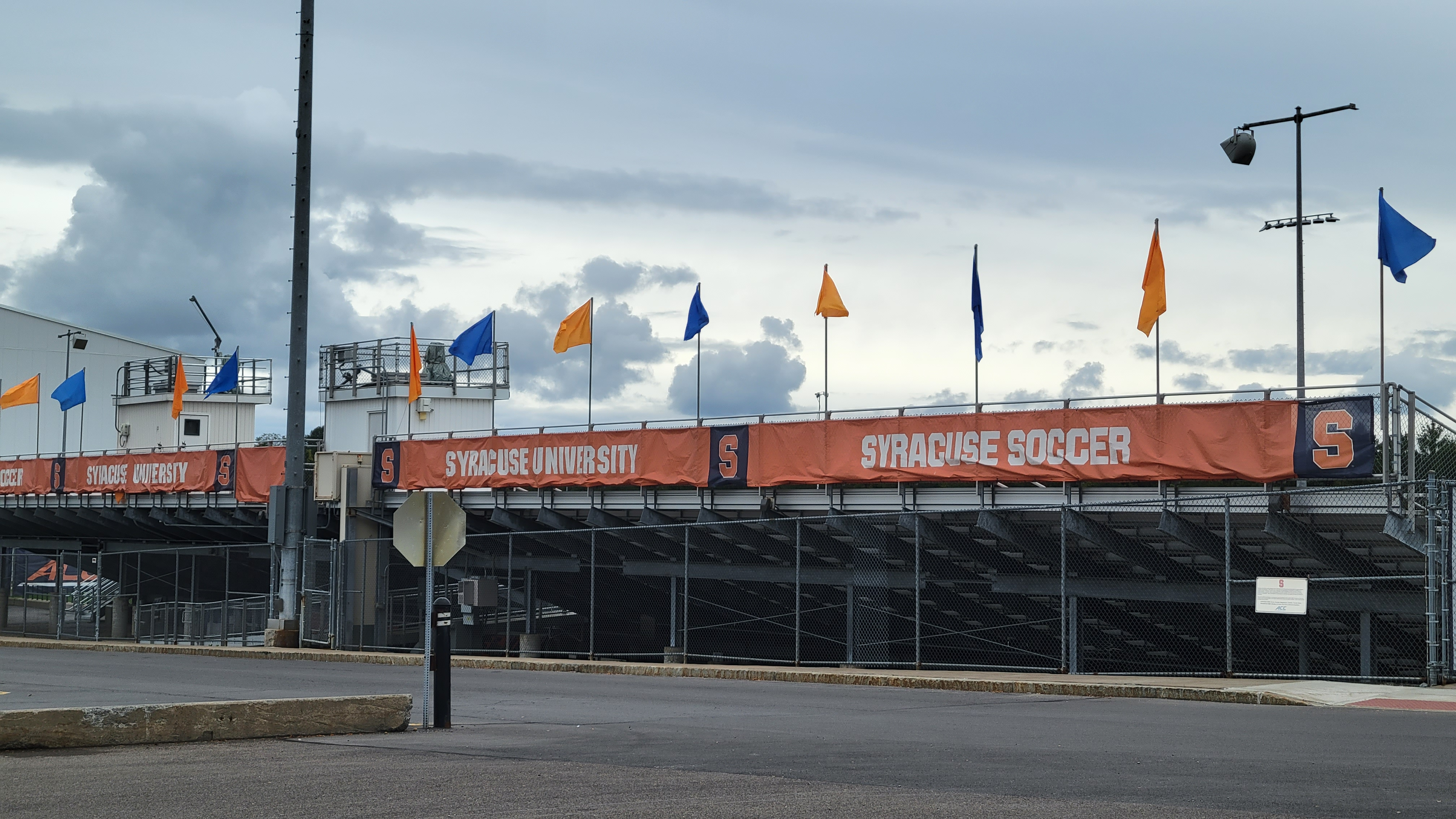
- Exterior view of the stadium in 2023
- Interactive map of SU Soccer Stadium
- Full name: Syracuse University Soccer Stadium
- Address: 1455 E Colvin St; Syracuse, NY; United States
- Owner: Syracuse University
- Operator: Syracuse University Athletics
- Capacity: 1,500
- Type: Stadium
- Surface: Grass
- Field size: 110 x 68 m
- Current use: Soccer

Construction
- Opened: August 31, 1996; 30 years ago

Tenants
- Syracuse Orange (NCAA) teams: men's and women's soccer (1996-present)

Website
- cuse.com/su-soccer-stadium

SU Soccer Stadium is a 1,500 seat soccer-specific stadium on the campus of Syracuse University in Syracuse, New York. The facility is home to the Syracuse Orange men's and women's soccer programs. The stadium opened on August 31, 1996 and is located behind the Manley Field House.
