= Riggs Field =

Soccer stadium at Clemson University

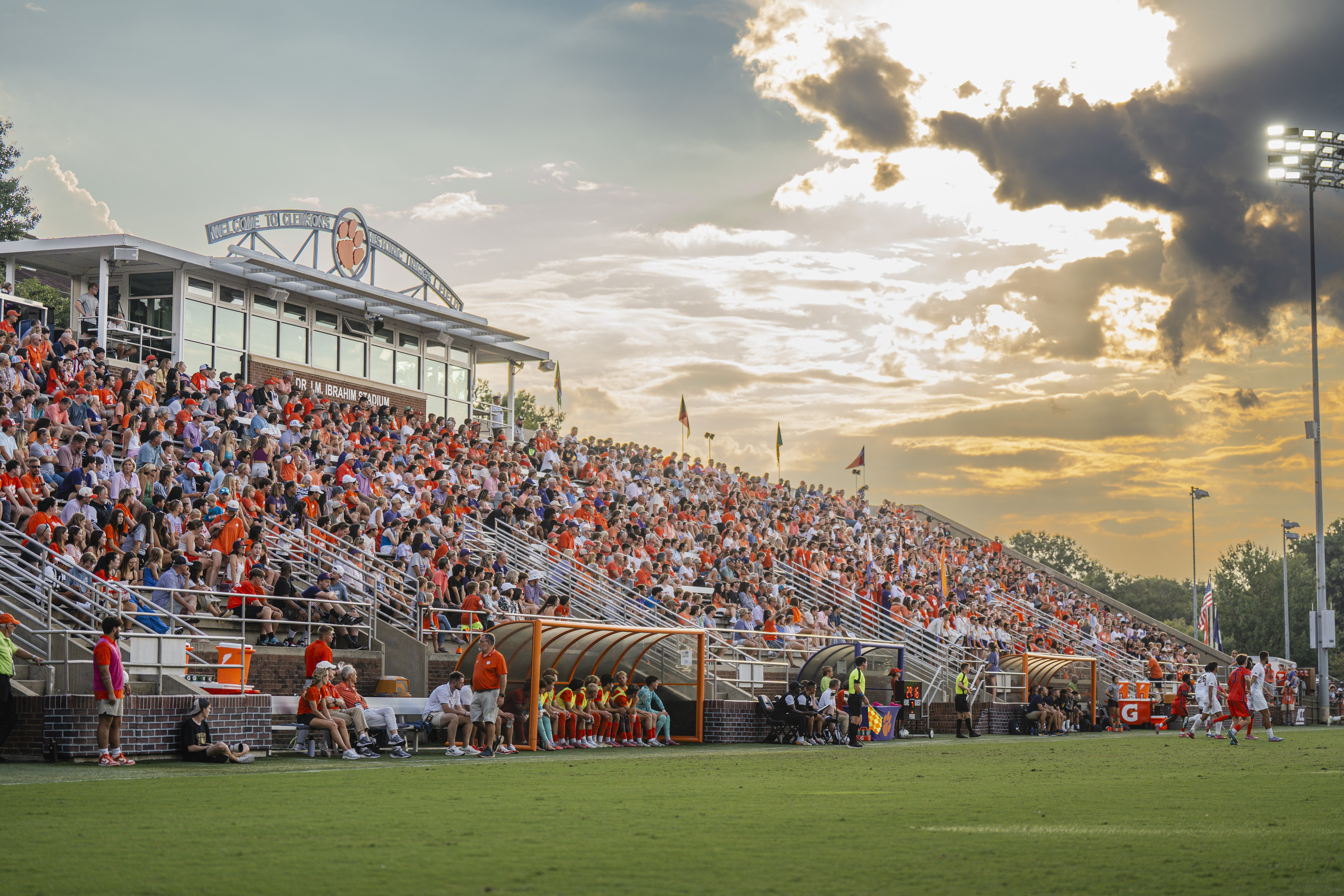
- The stadium in 2025
- Interactive map of Riggs Field
- Location: Clemson, South Carolina
- Coordinates: 34°40′54″N 82°50′20″W
- Owner: Clemson University
- Operator: Clemson University
- Capacity: 6,500
- Surface: Grass

Construction
- Opened: 1915; 111 years ago

Tenants
- Clemson Tigers football (1915–1941); Clemson Tigers baseball (1916–1969); Clemson Tigers men's & women's soccer (1980–present)

Website
- clemsontigers.com/riggs-field

Riggs Field is a 6,500-capacity soccer-specific stadium located in Clemson, South Carolina. The stadium is home to the Clemson Tigers men's and women's soccer teams. It has also hosted the NCAA Men's Soccer Championship in 1987. The stadium opened for soccer in 1980, and was renovated in 1987, and again in 2013. Previous to this, it hosted a variety of the school's athletic teams, including the football team from 1915 until 1941 and the baseball team from 1916 until 1969. It is named after Walter Riggs, the former coach of the football team and president of Clemson (1910–1924). Riggs Field is the fifth oldest collegiate athletic facility in the nation.

As first laid out in 1915, the football field, surrounded by a cinder track was at the east end of Riggs Field, tennis courts were in the center section, and the baseball diamond was at the west end of the space. A new baseball field was later laid out on an area of campus separate from the previous sports complex, and expanded tennis facilities replaced the former diamond. Riggs Field now generally only refers to the eastern portion where the football team played until 1941. The cinder track was eliminated during the remodeling as a soccer venue. It is now referred to as "Historic Riggs Field".

== Dedication ==
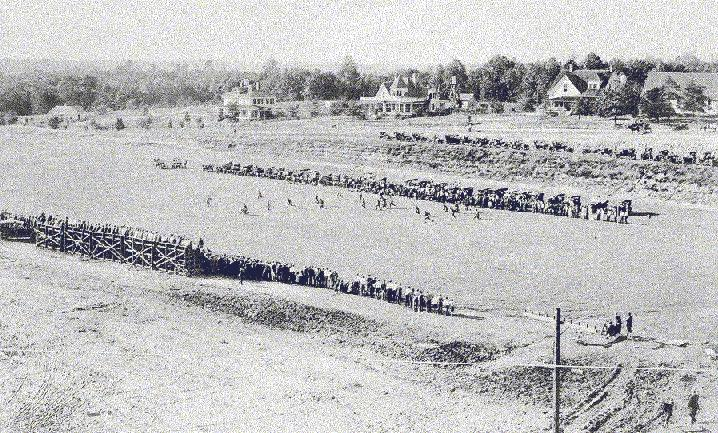
The stadium in 1915

On October 2, 1915, The Gala Day was declared for the dedication of the new athletic grounds. Riggs Field was dedicated prior to the football game with Davidson College. A parade to the field formed in front of the main building at 3 p.m. led, in this order, by the Cadet Band, speakers, Athletic Council, Alumni, faculty, and the Corps of Cadets. "Upon entering Riggs Field, the body took a 'C' formation and poured forth a thrilling volume of patriotic Tiger yells and songs." Presentation of the field to the Corps of Cadets by Dr. Walter Merritt Riggs followed. Prof. J. W. Gantt, President of the Athletic Association, introduced Dr. Riggs as "the man who has done more for the athletics at Clemson and probably more for Southern athletics than any other man." "In presentig [sic] the field to the corps of cadets, Dr. Riggs said in part; 'This magnificent field is a token of recognition by the Trustees of Clemson College of the importance of military and athletic training for the cadets. It is to be a place for the teaching of the principles of team work and fair play. On the crest of the hill stands the main Building which represents the intellectual side of life. In the immediate fore-ground we see the Textile Building. Here the brain and hand are trained to work together. Just to our left is the magnificent new Y. M. C. A. Building, standing for the development of spirit, mind, and body. In the immediate vicinity back of us are the churches, which are agents in the influencing of our spiritual natures. This large and beautiful athletic field is to stand for the development of the physical man, and, whether in real work or in play it is hoped that this field will be used as an agency in the developing of high and honorable men.'" Prof. Gantt introduces Mr. H. C. Tillman, Class of 1903 and President of the Clemson Alumni Association, who then christens the new playing field. Stated Tillman, "Students who have been and are to be, no matter how much we love other things, we love our athletic field best. Therefore, this field should be named for him who has done most for our athletics. Dr. Riggs is not only the father of athletics at Clemson but has coached our teams. It is not alone for gratitude, but for a sense of love and esteem that we name this field. May it bring victory to the Tigers' lair, and may it be represented by the honor and spirit Dr. Riggs has always shown. In the name of all students and lovers of Clemson, I christen this Field Riggs Field." A few minutes later, Dr. Riggs makes the initial kick-off in the first football game to be played on the new field. Clemson and Davidson play to a 6–6 tie. Informal dance given by the Thalian Club in the gymnasium, in honor of the Davidson football team, 9 p.m.-11:45 p.m.

== Stadium named ==
In early September 2011, the stadium surrounding Riggs Field was named Ibrahim Stadium after the late Dr. I. M. Ibrahim, who started Clemson's men's soccer program in 1967 and led the team to national titles in 1984 and 1987.

== 2013 Renovations ==
In 2013, Riggs Field underwent a second round of renovations. Stands were constructed to replace bleachers on the north side of the stadium. Additionally, a new entrance was constructed on this side of the stadium and pedestrian improvements were installed along the north side between the stadium and highway SC 93. A memorial to Walter Riggs was constructed at the new entrance on the north side. Renovations were completed in time for the 2013 soccer season.

== 100th anniversary celebration ==
On October 2, 2015, Clemson University celebrated Riggs Field's 100th anniversary. The Clemson University men's and women's soccer teams both played vs Virginia Tech and Wake Forest, respectively. Special promotions included a museum in the nearby indoor track to display artifacts and photos from Riggs Field's history, 2000 commemorative scarves to celebrate the occasion, and one uniform was given away during the women's game.

== In popular culture ==
The original configuration of the track and former football stadium, sans bleachers, was featured in a long scene in the latter portion of the 1974 Burt Lancaster movie The Midnight Man, filmed in part at Clemson University in 1973.

Preceded by Tacoma Dome	Host of the College Cup; 1987	Succeeded by Bill Armstrong Stadium
