= Louisville Cardinals men's soccer =

Men's soccer team of the University of Louisville

- 2026 Louisville Cardinals men's soccer team
- Founded: 1979; 47 years ago
- University: University of Louisville
- Head coach: John Michael Hayden (8th season)
- Conference: ACC
- Location: Louisville, Kentucky, US
- Stadium: Lynn Stadium (capacity: 5,300)
- Nickname: Cardinals
- Colors: Red and black
Home	Away

NCAA tournament runner-up
- 2010

NCAA tournament College Cup
- 2010

NCAA tournament Quarterfinals
- 2010, 2011, 2012, 2016

NCAA tournament Round of 16
- 2010, 2011, 2012, 2014, 2016, 2017, 2019

NCAA tournament appearances
- 2007, 2008, 2009, 2010, 2011, 2012, 2013, 2014, 2016, 2017, 2018, 2019, 2021, 2022, 2023

Conference tournament championships
- 2009, 2010, 2013, 2018

Conference regular season championships
- Big East; 2009, 2010, 2012 The American; 2013

The Louisville Cardinals men's soccer team represents the University of Louisville in all NCAA Division I men's college soccer competitions. The team presently competes in the Atlantic Coast Conference. The team currently plays in the soccer-specific Lynn Stadium on the campus.

== Overview ==
Nearly all of the Cardinals success has come in the last ten years of play under the helm of Ken Lolla. The Cardinals first qualified for the NCAA Division I Men's Soccer Championship in 2007, and have appeared in every NCAA Tournament since then except 2015, 2020 and 2021. Their best run came in 2010, where the Cardinals lost in the 2010 College Cup Final to the Akron Zips, 1–0. Since then, the Cardinals have reached the quarterfinals of the tournament in 2011, 2012, and 2016.

On December 27, 2018, Louisville named assistant coach John Michael Hayden to replace Lolla, who resigned on December 11 after leading the team for 13 seasons. Hayden, a graduate of local Trinity High School (named Kentucky Gatorade Player of the Year) played 4 seasons at Indiana University (winning two NCAA Championships) and several seasons professionally before retiring. Hayden served as an assistant coach for the Cardinals for four years before being promoted to his first head coaching position.

== Personnel ==
=== Current roster ===
As of 18 Feb 2025

Note: Flags indicate national team as defined under FIFA eligibility rules; some limited exceptions apply. Players may hold more than one non-FIFA nationality.

No.	Pos.	Nation	Player
1	GK	USA	AJ Piela
2	DF	USA	Gaetano D'Argento
3	DF	USA	Olayinka Ogunleye
4	DF	AUT	Luca Hollenstein
5	DF	AUS	Mason Tatafu
6	MF	USA	JP Jordan
7	FW	USA	Chase Vazquez
8	MF	USA	TJ Kahoalii
9	FW	USA	Gage Guerra
10	MF	SLO	Leon Kondic
11	FW	USA	Sammy Murphy
12	MF	NOR	Filip Fredhall
13	MF	CAN	Michael Lee
14	MF	MEX	Xavi Wences

No.	Pos.	Nation	Player
15	MF	NOR	Ola Arntsen
16	DF	USA	Josh Jones
17	MF	USA	Elijah Brijbasi
18	DF	USA	Ethan Subachan
19	DF	CAN	Noah De Blasis
20	DF	USA	Parker Forbes
21	MF	USA	Jack Boring
22	DF	USA	Fernando Sanchez
23	MF	FRA	Bilal Camara
24	FW	ENG	Jack Lewis
29	GK	USA	Alex Svetanoff
30	GK	ENG	Harvey Sellers
31	GK	USA	Liam McClen
46	MF	NOR	Sander Roed

=== Coaching staff ===
Position	Staff
John Michael Hayden	Head coach
Sean Teepen	Assistant coach
Stephen Lunney	Assistant coach
Jacob Bushue	Volunteer Assistant Coach
James Kusak	Director of Operations

== Notable alumni ==
=== Current professionals ===
As of February 18, 2025

- (United States) Jonny Walker (1994) – Currently Associate Head Coach with Memphis (women)
- (United States) Austin Berry (2007–2011) – Currently Strength & Conditioning Coach with FC Cincinnati
- (United States) Paolo DelPiccolo (2009–2012) – Currently Assistant Coach with Louisville City FC
- (United States) Andrew Farrell (2010–2012) – Currently with New England Revolution
- (United States) Marlon Hairston (2012–2013) – Currently with Hartford Athletic
- (United States) Ricardo Velazco (2013–2014) – Currently with Arizona Monsoon FC
- (United States) Andrew Brody (2013–2015) – Currently with Real Salt Lake
- (United States) Ethan Vanacore-Decker (2015) – Currently with Jackson Lions FC
- (United States) Tate Schmitt (2015–2018) – Currently with Houston Dynamo
- (United States) Stefan Cleveland (2016) – Currently with Austin FC
- (Japan) Kotaro Umeda (2016–2017) – Currently with Michigan Stars FC
- (United States) Elijah Amo (2017–2020) – Currently with Maryland Bobcats FC
- Haji Abdikadir (2018–2021) – Currently with Athlone Town and Somalia international
- (United States) Bradley Sample (2019–2023) – Currently with Pittsburgh Riverhounds SC
- (Bermuda) Detre Bell (2020–2021) – Currently with North Village Rams
