= Duke Blue Devils men's soccer =

American college soccer team

Duke Blue Devils Men's Soccer
- 2026 Duke Blue Devils men's soccer team
- Founded: 1935; 91 years ago
- University: Duke University
- Head coach: John Kerr, Jr. (19th season)
- Conference: ACC
- Location: Durham, North Carolina, US
- Stadium: Koskinen Stadium (capacity: 4,500)
- Nickname: Blue Devils
- Colors: Duke blue and white
Home	Away

NCAA tournament championships
- 1986

NCAA tournament runner-up
- 1982, 1995

NCAA tournament College Cup
- 1982, 1986, 1992, 1995, 2004

NCAA tournament Quarterfinals
- 1982, 1986, 1992, 1995, 2004, 2006, 2022

NCAA tournament Round of 16
- 1980, 1982, 1983, 1986, 1992, 1994, 1995, 1999, 2000, 2004, 2006, 2009, 2017, 2018, 2022, 2025

NCAA tournament appearances
- 1972, 1980, 1981, 1982, 1983, 1985, 1986, 1987, 1989, 1992, 1993, 1994, 1995, 1998, 1999, 2000, 2002, 2004, 2005, 2006, 2007, 2008, 2009, 2010, 2011, 2017, 2018, 2021, 2022, 2023, 2024, 2025

Conference tournament championships
- 1999, 2005, 2006

Conference regular season championships
- 1980, 1997, 1999, 2000, 2006

The Duke Blue Devils men's soccer team is the men's soccer program that represents Duke University. The Blue Devils compete in NCAA Division I as a member of the Atlantic Coast Conference (ACC).

They won their first and only NCAA tournament in 1986, co-captained by their current head coach, John Kerr Jr. and Mike Linenberger. Facilities included both turf and grass fields, a newly constructed weight room and training room (as of fall 2016), and a student-athlete academic advising facility. John Kerr Jr. is assisted by Michael Brady and Chris Rich.

== Current roster ==
As of 8 Sep 2024

Note: Flags indicate national team as defined under FIFA eligibility rules; some limited exceptions apply. Players may hold more than one non-FIFA nationality.

No.	Pos.	Nation	Player
00	GK	USA	Ryan Gallagher
0	GK	USA	Grant Farley
1	GK	NED	Wessel Speel
2	DF	USA	Jamie Kabussu
3	DF	USA	Kamran Acito
4	DF	USA	Trevor Burns
5	MF	USA	Alex Hauschild
6	MF	USA	Cameron Kerr
7	MF	USA	Felix Barajas
8	MF	NOR	Bull Jorgensen
9	FW	ISL	Ulfur Bjornsson
10	MF	USA	Drew Kerr
11	FW	BER	Colton Pleasants
12	MF	USA	Ruben Mesalles
13	FW	USA	Jose Ortega
15	MF	USA	Jack Zugay

No.	Pos.	Nation	Player
16	MF	USA	Luke Thomas
17	MF	USA	Adrian Byasiima
18	MF	USA	Julius Suber
19	DF	USA	Sintayehu Clements
20	MF	USA	Andrew Myerson
21	FW	GER	Niclas Wittur
22	MF	USA	Caleb Donaldson
23	MF	USA	Kenan Hot
24	DF	ISL	Axel Gudbjornsson
25	MF	USA	Hudson Hazlewood
26	FW	USA	Adam Luckhurst
28	MF	USA	Sebastian Docters
29	DF	USA	Nate Mulvaney
30	GK	USA	Nathan Gaviser
31	FW	ENG	Sol Arbib
32	MF	USA	Jackson Lagos

== Coaching staff ==
Position	Staff
Athletic director	(United States) Nina King
Head coach	(United States) John Kerr
Associate head coach	(England) Michael Brady
Assistant coach	(United States) Kyle Renfro
Volunteer assistant coach	(United States) Tristan Wierbonski

== Facilities ==
=== Koskinen Stadium ===
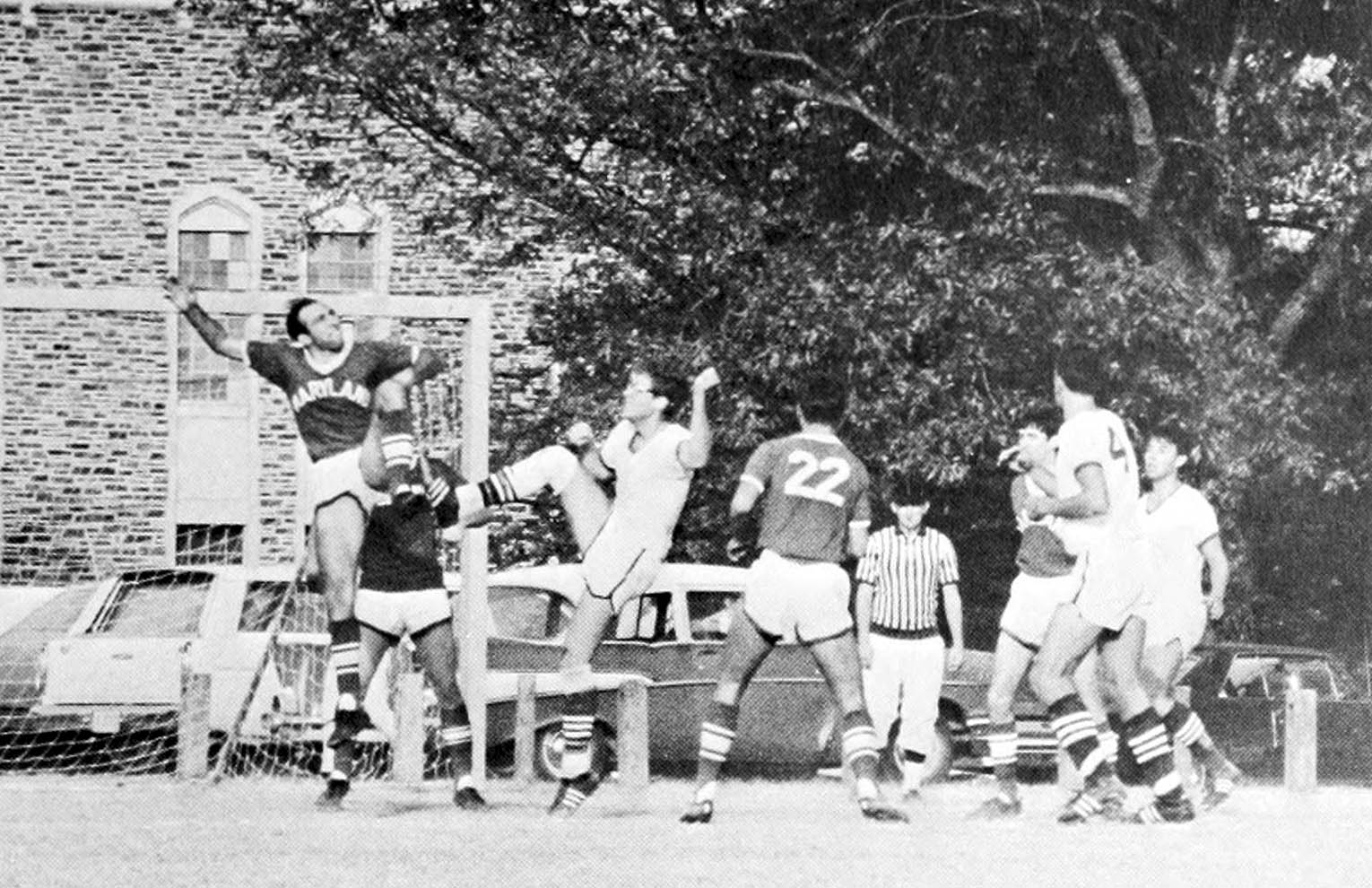
Duke v Maryland, 1968

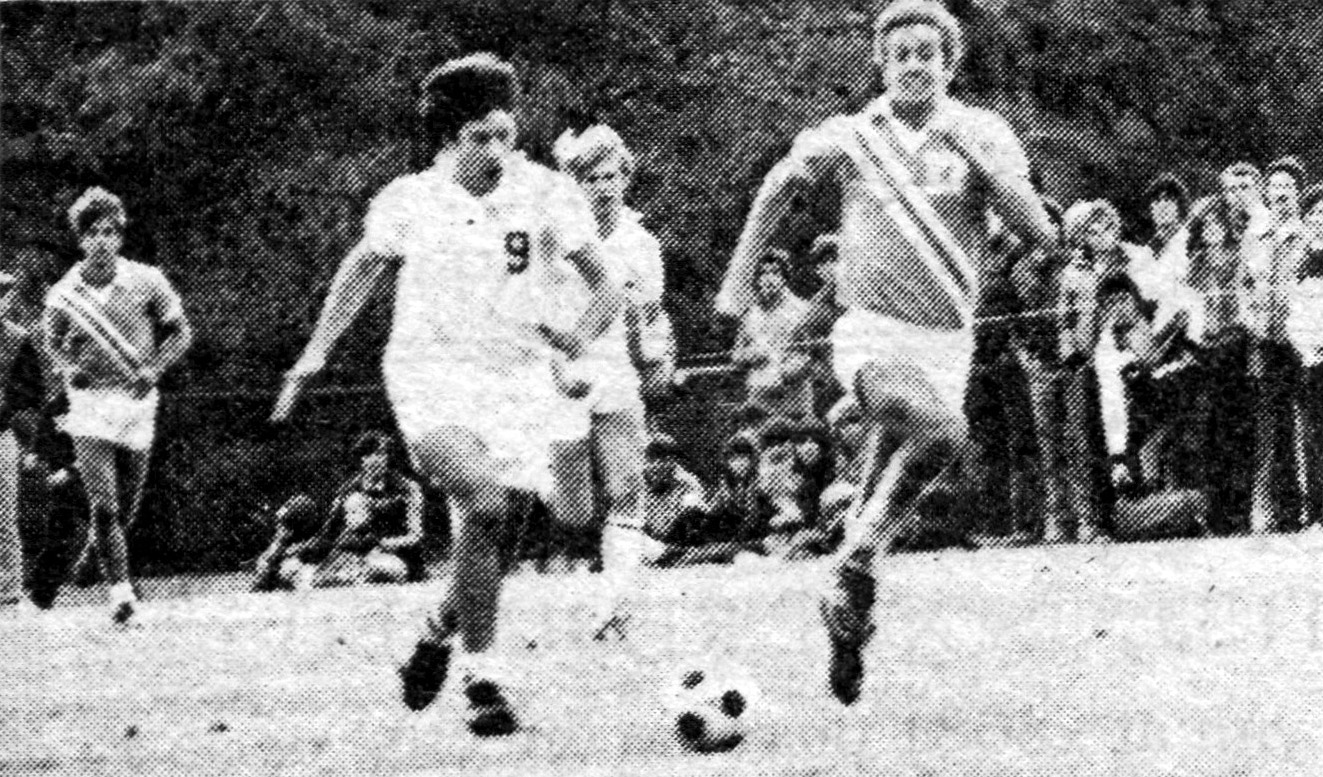
Duke v North Carolina, 1980

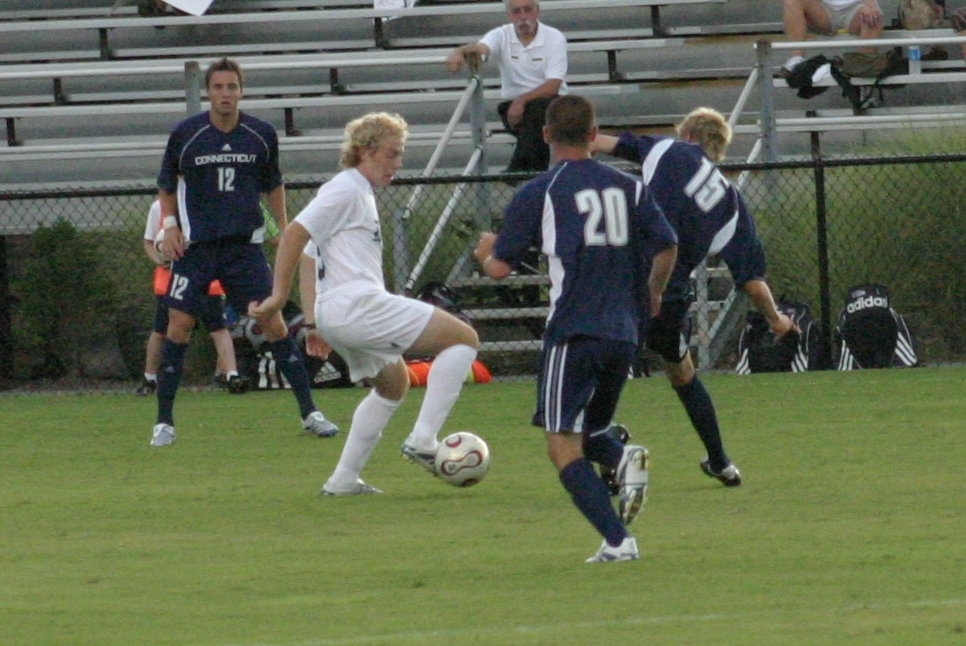
Duke (in white) vs. UConn in 2006

The facility that the Blue Devils Men's Soccer Team uses to play their matches. The stadium holds 7,000 and seats 4,500. The players play on Bermuda grass. The field is 75x120 yards. There are two locker rooms and a field house inside the stadium. In January 2015, there was a new press box revealed during a grand opening called Kennedy Tower, which was dedicated in honor of Chris and Ana Kennedy. Chris is the Duke Senior Deputy Director of Athletes. The Kennedy Tower, offers press boxes and hospitality suites at the top of Koskinen Stadium. In the fall of 2015, the new Track and Field facility opened on the opposite side of Kennedy Tower. Koskinen Stadium is home for Duke Men's Soccer, Duke Women's Soccer, Duke Men's Lacrosse, and Duke Women's Lacrosse.

=== Training facilities ===
In addition to Koskinen Stadium, Duke has a training ground (751 Practice Fields). 751 has 1 grass field and an additional 18-yard box designed specifically for shooting and goalie training. The team's practice locker rooms are located in the Murray Building, next to Koskinen stadium,

== Recruiting ==
The Blue Devil's have been one of the successful programs with recruiting since 2010. Seven of the last eight recruiting classes have been ranked inside the top 25 nationally. That doesn't change in 2017 as Duke's incoming class has been ranked 11th by College Soccer News. For a more in depth look at Duke's 2017 incoming freshman class, click here.

High school graduating year	National ranking
2010	#18
2011	#3
2012	#16
2013	#22
2014	#4
2015	N/A
2016	#15
2017	#11

== Notable alumni ==
=== Current professionals ===
As of March 19, 2025

- (United States) Mike Jeffries (1980–1983) – Currently head coach with Charlotte Independence
- (United States) John Klein (1983–1984) – Currently head coach with Columbia College (women)
- (United States) John Kerr (1984–1986) – Currently head coach with Duke
- (United States) Tom Stone (1984–1987) – Currently head coach with Texas Tech (women)
- (England) James Belshaw (2009–2012) – Currently with Notts County
- (United States) Sean Davis (2009–2011) – Currently with Nashville SC
- (Nigeria) Sebastien Ibeagha (2010–2013) – Currently with FC Dallas
- (United States) Jeremy Ebobisse (2014–2015) – Currently with Los Angeles FC
- (United States) Brian White (2014–2017) – Currently with Vancouver Whitecaps FC
- (United States) Aedan Stanley (2018–2019) – Currently with Indy Eleven
- (United States) Ian Murphy (2018–2021) – Currently with Colorado Rapids
- (Spain) Sergi Nus (2019) – Currently assistant coach with UCLA
- (United States) Peter Stroud (2020–2022) – Currently with New York Red Bulls
- (Iceland) Thorleifur Úlfarsson (2021) – Currently with Debrecen
- (Ghana) Shak Mohammed (2021–2022) – Currently with Orlando City SC
- Wayne Frederick (2022–2023) – Currently with Colorado Rapids and Trinidad and Tobago international
- (Ghana) Forster Ajago (2023) – Currently with Real Salt Lake
- (United States) Julian Eyestone (2023) – Currently with Brentford F.C.

== Honours ==
- NCAA Division I tournament (1): 1986
- Atlantic Coast Conference (5): 1980, 1982, 1999, 2005, 2006
