= 2017 Pac-12 Conference men's soccer season =

- League: NCAA Division I
- Sport: Soccer
- Duration: August, 2017 – November, 2017
- Teams: 6

2018 MLS SuperDraft
- Top draft pick: Tomas Hilliard-Arce, Stanford
- Picked by: LA Galaxy, 2nd overall

Regular season
- Champions: Stanford
- Runners-up: California
- Season MVP: Foster Langsdorf, Stanford

Pac-12 Conference men's soccer seasons
- ← 2016 2018 →

2017 Pac-12 Conference men's soccer standings
| | Conf. | | | | | Overall |
| Team | W | | L | | T | W | | L | | T |
|---|---|---|---|---|---|---|---|---|---|---|
| No. 1 Stanford ‡ | 9 | – | 0 | – | 1 | 19 | – | 2 | – | 2 |
| California + | 6 | – | 4 | – | 0 | 11 | – | 7 | – | 0 |
| Washington + | 5 | – | 4 | – | 1 | 12 | – | 7 | – | 1 |
| UCLA | 4 | – | 6 | – | 0 | 7 | – | 10 | – | 1 |
| Oregon State | 4 | – | 6 | – | 0 | 7 | – | 11 | – | 0 |
| San Diego State | 1 | – | 9 | – | 0 | 6 | – | 13 | – | 0 |
‡ – Conference champion + – Invited to the 2017 NCAA Division I Men's Soccer Championship; As of December 13, 2017; Rankings from United Soccer Coaches

The 2017 Pac-12 Conference men's soccer season was the 18th season of men's varsity soccer in the conference.

Stanford, who entered the season as the three-time defending Pac-12 champions, successfully defended their title for the fourth consecutive season, by winning the regular season (there is no conference tournament). The Cardinal were also the two-time defending NCAA champions, and successfully defended their title. California and Washington earned at-large berths into the 2017 NCAA Division I Men's Soccer Tournament, but were both eliminated in the first round.

Stanford's Foster Langsdorf, won the Pac-12 Conference Men's Soccer Player of the Year

== Teams ==
=== Stadiums and locations ===
| Team | Location | Stadium | Capacity |
|---|---|---|---|
| California Golden Bears | Berkeley, California | Edwards Stadium | 22,000 |
| Oregon State Beavers | Corvallis, Oregon | Lorenz Field | 2,200 |
| San Diego State Aztecs | San Diego, California | SDSU Sports Deck | 1,000 |
| Stanford Cardinal | Stanford, California | Cagan Stadium | 4,000 |
| UCLA Bruins | Los Angeles, California | Drake Stadium | 7,000 |
| Washington Huskies | Seattle, Washington | Husky Soccer Stadium | 1,640 |

- Arizona, Arizona State, Colorado, Oregon, USC, Utah and Washington State do not sponsor men's soccer. San Diego State is an associated member.

== Preseason ==
=== Recruiting ===
National rankings
| Team | CSN | TDS | Total signees |
|---|---|---|---|
| California | NR | NR | 7 |
| Oregon State | NR | NR | 9 |
| San Diego State | NR | NR | 7 |
| Stanford | 1 | 1 | 10 |
| UCLA | 14 | 16 | 6 |
| Washington | NR | 14 | 8 |

=== Preseason poll ===
The preseason poll was released on August 15, 2017.

| | Team ranking | First-place votes | Raw points |
| 1. | Stanford | 4 | 24 |
| 2. | UCLA | 1 | 22 |
| 3. | Washington | 1 | 19 |
| 4. | San Diego State | 0 | 10 |
| 5. | Oregon State | 0 | 8 |
| 6. | California | 0 | 7 |

== Head coaches ==
| Team | Head coach | Previous job | Years at school | Overall record | Record at school | P12 record | NCAA tournaments | NCAA College Cups | NCAA Titles |
|---|---|---|---|---|---|---|---|---|---|
| California | Kevin Grimes | SMU (asst.) | 18 | 196–118–51 (.607) | 173–105–38 (.608) | 73–70–21 (.509) | 11 | 0 | 0 |
| Oregon State | Steve Simmons | Northern Illinois | 9 | 128–118–28 (.518) | 69–72–17 (.491) | 22–45–11 (.353) | 2 | 0 | 0 |
| San Diego State | Lev Kirshner | San Diego State (asst.) | 18 | – (–) | – (–) | – (–) | 3 | 0 | 0 |
| Stanford | Jeremy Gunn | Charlotte | 6 | – (–) | – (–) | – (–) | 6 | 2 | 2 |
| UCLA | Jorge Salcedo | UCLA (asst.) | 14 | – (–) | – (–) | – (–) | 8 | 3 | 0 |
| Washington | Jamie Clark | Creighton | 7 | – (–) | – (–) | – (–) | 4 | 0 | 0 |

== Regular season ==
Index to colors and formatting
Pac-12 member won
Pac-12 member lost
Pac-12 member tied
Pac-12 teams in **bold**

All times Pacific time.

=== Week 1 (Aug 21-27) ===
Schedule and results:

| Date | Time (PT) | Visiting team | Home team | Site | TV | Result | Attendance |
|---|---|---|---|---|---|---|---|
| August 25 | 4:30 p.m. | West Virginia | **California** | Edwards Stadium • Berkeley, CA | | **L** 0–1 | 0 |
| August 25 | 5:00 p.m. | **#1 Stanford** | San Jose State | Spartan Soccer Field • San Jose, CA; Rivalry | | **W** 4–0 | 1,028 |
| August 25 | 8:00 p.m. | Fairfield | **Oregon State** | Lorenz Field • Corvallis, OR | | **L** 1–2 | 394 |
| August 25 | 8:00 p.m. | New Mexico | **#11 Washington** | Husky Soccer Stadium • Seattle, WA | P12N | **W** 2–1 | 710 |
| August 26 | 7:00 p.m. | **#22 UCLA** | San Francisco | Negoesco Stadium • San Francisco, CA | | **W** 5–3 | 1,338 |
| August 27 | 3:30 p.m. | Loyola Marymount | **Washington** | Husky Soccer Stadium • Seattle, WA | P12N | **W** 2–0 | 477 |

Players of the week:

| Offensive | | Defensive | | Goalkeeper | | Rookie | |
| Player | Team | Player | Team | Player | Team | Player | Team |
|---|---|---|---|---|---|---|---|
| Joey Parish | Washington | | | | | | |
Reference: Pac-12 Conference

=== Week 2 (Aug 28-Sep 3) ===
Schedule and results:

| Date | Time (PT) | Visiting team | Home team | Site | TV | Result | Attendance |
|---|---|---|---|---|---|---|---|
| August 28 | 1:00 p.m. | UNLV | **Oregon State** | Lorenz Field • Corvallis, OR | P12N | **W** 1–0 ^{OT} | 147 |
| September 1 | 4:00 p.m. | American | **Oregon State** | Gonzaga Soccer Field • Spokane, WA; Gonzaga Tournament | | **L** 0–1 | 200 |
| September 1 | 4:00 p.m. | **#15 UCLA** | #6 Maryland | Ludwig Field • College Park, MD | BTN | **L** 2–3 ^{OT} | 7,532 |
| September 1 | 4:30 p.m. | Northeastern | **California** | Edwards Stadium • Berkeley, CA | | **W** 1–0 | 155 |
| September 1 | 4:30 p.m. | **#10 Washington** | #24 Akron | Cub Cadet Field • Akron, OH | ESPN3 | **L** 0–2 | 1,987 |
| September 1 | 7:00 p.m. | #23 Creighton | **#1 Stanford** | Laird Q. Cagan Stadium • Stanford, CA | P12N | **W** 3–0 | 1,916 |
| September 3 | 11:00 a.m. | UC Riverside | **Oregon State** | Gonzaga Soccer Field • Spokane, WA; Gonzaga Tournament | | **W** 3–2 | 107 |
| September 3 | 4:30 p.m. | #23 Creighton | **California** | Edwards Stadium • Berkeley, CA | P12N | **L** 0–3 | 310 |
| September 3 | 5:00 p.m. | Northeastern | **#1 Stanford** | Laird Q. Cagan Stadium • Stanford, CA | | **W** 1–0 | 613 |

Players of the week:

| Offensive | | Defensive | | Goalkeeper | | Rookie | |
| Player | Team | Player | Team | Player | Team | Player | Team |
|---|---|---|---|---|---|---|---|
Reference: Pac-12 Conference

=== Week 3 (Sep 4-10) ===
Schedule and results:

| Date | Time (PT) | Visiting team | Home team | Site | TV | Result | Attendance |
|---|---|---|---|---|---|---|---|
| September 4 | 9:00 a.m. | **UCLA** | Georgetown | Shaw Field • Washington, DC | FSGO | | |
| September 7 | 7:00 p.m. | **Washington** | Gonzaga | Gonzaga Soccer Field • Spokane, WA | | | |
| September 7 | 8:00 p.m. | SMU | **Stanford** | Laird Q. Cagan Stadium • Stanford, CA | P12N | | |
| September 8 | 2:00 p.m. | **Oregon State** | Colgate | Beyer-Small '76 Field • Hamilton, NY | | **L** 0–1 | 725 |
| September 9 | 7:00 p.m. | **California** | Portland | Merlo Field • Portland, OR | | **W** 2–1 | 1,743 |
| September 9 | 7:00 p.m. | Tulsa | **Stanford** | Laird Q. Cagan Stadium • Stanford, CA | P12N | | |
| September 10 | 1:00 p.m. | Mercer | **Washington** | Husky Soccer Stadium • Seattle, WA | | | |

Players of the week:

| Offensive | | Defensive | | Goalkeeper | | Rookie | |
| Player | Team | Player | Team | Player | Team | Player | Team |
|---|---|---|---|---|---|---|---|
Reference: Pac-12 Conference

=== Week 4 (Sep 11-17) ===
Schedule and results:

| Date | Time (PT) | Visiting team | Home team | Site | TV | Result | Attendance |
|---|---|---|---|---|---|---|---|
| September 11 | 7:00 p.m. | UNLV | **UCLA** | Drake Stadium • Los Angeles, CA | P12N | | |
| September 12 | 4:00 p.m. | **Oregon State** | #7 Syracuse | SU Soccer Stadium • Syracuse, NY | ESPN3 | **L** 2–3 | 1,422 |
| September 14 | 7:00 p.m. | Drexel | **Washington** | Husky Soccer Stadium • Seattle, WA | | | |
| September 15 | 4:30 p.m. | Yale | **California** | Edwards Stadium • Berkeley, CA | P12N | **W** 1–0 | 368 |
| September 15 | 7:00 p.m. | San Francisco | **Stanford** | Laird Q. Cagan Stadium • Stanford, CA | | | |
| September 17 | 1:00 p.m. | Yale | **Stanford** | Laird Q. Cagan Stadium • Stanford, CA | P12N | | |
| September 17 | 2:00 p.m. | Santa Clara | **Washington** | Husky Soccer Stadium • Seattle, WA | | | |
| September 17 | 7:00 p.m. | **California** | San Francisco | Negoesco Stadium • San Francisco, CA | P12N | **W** 3–2 | 539 |
| September 17 | 7:00 p.m. | #23 Portland | **Oregon State** | Lorenz Field • Corvallis, OR | | **L** 0–1 | 374 |

Players of the week:

| Offensive | | Defensive | | Goalkeeper | | Rookie | |
| Player | Team | Player | Team | Player | Team | Player | Team |
|---|---|---|---|---|---|---|---|
Reference: Pac-12 Conference

=== Week 5 (Sep 18-24) ===
Schedule and results:

| Date | Time (PT) | Visiting team | Home team | Site | TV | Result | Attendance |
|---|---|---|---|---|---|---|---|
| September 19 | 4:00 p.m. | **UCLA** | Clemson | Riggs Field • Clemson, SC | | | |
| September 21 | 7:00 p.m. | Utah Valley | **Washington** | Husky Soccer Stadium • Seattle, WA | | | |
| September 22 | 4:30 p.m. | Santa Clara | **California** | Edwards Stadium • Berkeley, CA | | **W** 3–2 | 300 |
| September 22 | 7:00 p.m. | #17 Pacific | **Oregon State** | Lorenz Field • Corvallis, OR | | **W** 2–0 | 418 |
| September 23 | 12:00 p.m. | **Stanford** | Saint Louis | Hermann Stadium • St. Louis, MO | | | |
| September 24 | 6:00 p.m. | Cal State Northridge | **UCLA** | Drake Stadium • Los Angeles, CA | | | |
| September 24 | 6:00 p.m. | **Washington** | Seattle U | Championship Field Stadium • Seattle, WA; Seattle Derby | | | |

Players of the week:

| Offensive | | Defensive | | Goalkeeper | | Rookie | |
| Player | Team | Player | Team | Player | Team | Player | Team |
|---|---|---|---|---|---|---|---|
Reference: Pac-12 Conference

=== Week 6 (Sep 25-Oct 1) ===
Schedule and results:

| Date | Time (PT) | Visiting team | Home team | Site | TV | Result | Attendance |
|---|---|---|---|---|---|---|---|
| September 28 | TBD | **Stanford** | **San Diego State** | SDSU Sports Deck • San Diego, CA | | | |
| September 28 | 8:00 p.m. | **California** | **UCLA** | Drake Stadium • Los Angeles, CA; Cal Week | P12N | **CAL** 2–0 | 3,285 |
| October 1 | 12:00 p.m. | **California** | **San Diego State** | SDSU Sports Deck • San Diego, CA | | **CAL** 1–0 | 406 |
| October 1 | 3:00 p.m. | **Oregon State** | #17 **Washington** | Husky Soccer Stadium • Seattle, WA; The Cascade Clash | P12N | **UW** 2–1 | 990 |
| October 1 | 5:00 p.m. | **Stanford** | **UCLA** | Drake Stadium • Los Angeles, CA | P12N | | |

Players of the week:

| Offensive | | Defensive | | Goalkeeper | | Rookie | |
| Player | Team | Player | Team | Player | Team | Player | Team |
|---|---|---|---|---|---|---|---|
Reference: Pac-12 Conference

=== Week 7 (Oct 2-8) ===
Schedule and results:

| Date | Time (PT) | Visiting team | Home team | Site | TV | Result | Attendance |
|---|---|---|---|---|---|---|---|
| October 5 | 4:00 p.m. | **UCLA** | **Oregon State** | Lorenz Field • Corvallis, OR | P12N | | |
| October 5 | 7:00 p.m. | **San Diego State** | **Washington** | Husky Soccer Stadium • Seattle, WA | P12N | | |
| October 8 | 11:00 a.m. | **San Diego State** | **Oregon State** | Lorenz Field • Corvallis, OR | P12N | | |
| October 8 | 3:00 p.m. | **Stanford** | **California** | Edwards Stadium • Berkeley, CA; Big Game | P12N | **STAN** 3–0 | 1,166 |
| October 8 | 5:00 p.m. | **UCLA** | **Washington** | Husky Soccer Stadium • Seattle, WA | P12N | | |

Players of the week:

| Offensive | | Defensive | | Goalkeeper | | Rookie | |
| Player | Team | Player | Team | Player | Team | Player | Team |
|---|---|---|---|---|---|---|---|
Reference: Pac-12 Conference

=== Week 8 (Oct 9-15) ===
Schedule and results:

| Date | Time (PT) | Visiting team | Home team | Site | TV | Result | Attendance |
|---|---|---|---|---|---|---|---|
| October 12 | 4:00 p.m. | **Oregon State** | **California** | Edwards Stadium • Berkeley, CA | P12N | **CAL** 1–0 | 189 |
| October 12 | 6:00 p.m. | **Washington** | **Stanford** | Laird Q. Cagan Stadium • Stanford, CA | P12N | | |
| October 15 | 11:00 a.m. | **Oregon State** | **Stanford** | Laird Q. Cagan Stadium • Stanford, CA | P12N | | |
| October 15 | 3:00 p.m. | **Washington** | **California** | Edwards Stadium • Berkeley, CA | P12N | **CAL** 2–1 | 605 |
| October 15 | 5:00 p.m. | **San Diego State** | **UCLA** | Drake Stadium • Los Angeles, CA | P12N | | |

Players of the week:

| Offensive | | Defensive | | Goalkeeper | | Rookie | |
| Player | Team | Player | Team | Player | Team | Player | Team |
|---|---|---|---|---|---|---|---|
Reference: Pac-12 Conference

=== Week 9 (Oct 16-22) ===
Schedule and results:

| Date | Time (PT) | Visiting team | Home team | Site | TV | Result | Attendance |
|---|---|---|---|---|---|---|---|
| October 18 | 6:00 p.m. | UCLA | New Mexico | UNM Soccer Complex • Albuquerque, NM | | | |
| October 19 | 3:00 p.m. | California | **Oregon State** | Lorenz Field • Corvallis, OR | P12N | **OSU** 2–1 | 101 |
| October 19 | 8:00 p.m. | Stanford | **Washington** | Husky Soccer Stadium • Seattle, WA | P12N | | |
| October 22 | 1:00 p.m. | Stanford | **Oregon State** | Lorenz Field • Corvallis, OR | | | |
| October 22 | 5:00 p.m. | California | **Washington** | Husky Soccer Stadium • Seattle, WA | P12N | **UW** 3–0 | 570 |
| October 22 | 5:00 p.m. | UCLA | San Diego | Torero Stadium • San Diego, CA | | | |

Players of the week:

| Offensive | | Defensive | | Goalkeeper | | Rookie | |
| Player | Team | Player | Team | Player | Team | Player | Team |
|---|---|---|---|---|---|---|---|
Reference: Pac-12 Conference

=== Week 10 (Oct 23-29) ===
Schedule and results:

| Date | Time (PT) | Visiting team | Home team | Site | TV | Result | Attendance |
|---|---|---|---|---|---|---|---|
| October 26 | TBD | **Washington** | **San Diego State** | SDSU Sports Deck • San Diego, CA | | | |
| October 26 | 4:30 p.m. | **Oregon State** | **UCLA** | Drake Stadium • Los Angeles, CA | P12N | | |
| October 29 | 12:00 p.m. | **Oregon State** | **San Diego State** | SDSU Sports Deck • San Diego, CA | | | |
| October 29 | 5:00 p.m. | **Washington** | **UCLA** | Drake Stadium • Los Angeles, CA | P12N | | |

Players of the week:

| Offensive | | Defensive | | Goalkeeper | | Rookie | |
| Player | Team | Player | Team | Player | Team | Player | Team |
|---|---|---|---|---|---|---|---|
Reference: Pac-12 Conference

=== Week 11 (Oct 30-Nov 5) ===
Schedule and results:

| Date | Time (PT) | Visiting team | Home team | Site | TV | Result | Attendance |
|---|---|---|---|---|---|---|---|
| November 2 | 3:30 p.m. | **San Diego State** | **California** | Edwards Stadium • Berkeley, CA | P12N | **CAL** 1–0 | 160 |
| November 2 | 5:30 p.m. | **UCLA** | **Stanford** | Laird Q. Cagan Stadium • Stanford, CA | P12N | | |
| November 5 | 1:00 p.m. | **UCLA** | **California** | Edwards Stadium • Berkeley, CA; Rivalry | P12N | **CAL** 3–2 | 746 |
| November 5 | 5:00 p.m. | **San Diego State** | **Stanford** | Laird Q. Cagan Stadium • Stanford, CA | P12N | | |

Players of the week:

| Offensive | | Defensive | | Goalkeeper | | Rookie | |
| Player | Team | Player | Team | Player | Team | Player | Team |
|---|---|---|---|---|---|---|---|
Reference: Pac-12 Conference

=== Week 12 (Nov 6-Nov 12) ===
Schedule and results:

| Date | Time (PT) | Visiting team | Home team | Site | TV | Result | Attendance |
|---|---|---|---|---|---|---|---|
| November 9 | 2:00 p.m. | **Washington** | **Oregon State** | Lorenz Field • Corvallis, OR; The Cascade Clash | P12N | | |
| November 9 | 7:00 p.m. | **California** | **Stanford** | Laird Q. Cagan Stadium • Stanford, CA; Big Game | P12N | **STAN** 1–0 | 1,474 |
| November 11 | 7:00 p.m. | **UCLA** | **San Diego State** | SDSU Sports Deck • San Diego, CA | | | |

Players of the week:

| Offensive | | Defensive | | Goalkeeper | | Rookie | |
| Player | Team | Player | Team | Player | Team | Player | Team |
|---|---|---|---|---|---|---|---|
Reference: Pac-12 Conference

== Rankings ==
=== United Soccer Coaches National ===
Legend
| Increase in ranking |
| Decrease in ranking |
| Not ranked previous week |

| | | Pre | Wk 1 | Wk 2 | Wk 3 | Wk 4 | Wk 5 | Wk 6 | Wk 7 | Wk 8 | Wk 9 | Wk 10 | Wk 11 | Wk 12 | Final |
|---|---|---|---|---|---|---|---|---|---|---|---|---|---|---|---|
| California | C | | | | | | RV | 24 | RV | 17 | 24 | RV | | | |
| Oregon State | C | | | | | | | | | | | | | | |
| San Diego State | C | | | | | | | | | | | | | | |
| Stanford | C | 1 | 1 | 1 | 5 | 5 | 11 | 8 | 8 | 6 | 5 | 4 | | | |
| UCLA | C | 21 | 15 | 25 | NR | | | | | | | | | | |
| Washington | C | 11 | 10 | 16 | RV | RV | 17 | 22 | 19 | 21 | 23 | 17 | | | |

=== United Soccer Coaches Far West Regional ===
Legend
| Increase in ranking |
| Decrease in ranking |
| Not ranked previous week |

| | | Wk 1 | Wk 2 | Wk 3 | Wk 4 | Wk 5 | Wk 6 | Wk 7 | Wk 8 | Wk 9 | Wk 10 | Wk 11 | Wk 12 |
|---|---|---|---|---|---|---|---|---|---|---|---|---|---|
| California | C | 8 | | | | | | | | | | | |
| Oregon State | C | | | | | | | | | | | | |
| San Diego State | C | | | | | | | | | | | | |
| Stanford | C | 1 | | | | | | | | | | | |
| UCLA | C | 3 | | | | | | | | | | | |
| Washington | C | 2 | | | | | | | | | | | |

== Postseason ==
=== NCAA tournament ===
| Seed | Region | School | 1st round | 2nd round | 3rd round | Quarterfinals | Semifinals | Championship |
|---|---|---|---|---|---|---|---|---|
| 9 | 1 | Stanford | BYE | T, 0–0 ^{W, 10–9 PK} vs. Pacific – (Stanford) | W, 2–0 vs. Coastal Carolina – (Stanford) | W, 2–0 vs. #1 Wake Forest – (Winston-Salem) | W, 2–0 vs. #5 Akron – (Chester) | W, 1–0^{OT} vs. #5 Indiana – (Chester) |
| —N/a | 2 | California | L, 1–2 vs. San Francisco – (Berkeley) | | | | | |
| —N/a | 2 | Washington | L, 2–3 ^{OT} vs. Seattle U – (Seattle) | | | | | |

== All-Pac-12 awards and teams ==
2017 Pac-12 Men's Soccer Individual Awards
| Award | Recipient(s) |
| Player of the Year | Foster Langsdorf, Stanford |
| Coach of the Year | Jeremy Gunn, Stanford |
| Defender of the Year | Tomas Hilliard-Arce, Stanford |
| Freshman of the Year | Blake Bodily, Washington |

2017 Pac-12 Men's Soccer All-Conference Teams
| First Team | Second Team | Honorable Mention |
| Corey Baird, Sr., FW, Stanford; Tanner Beason, R-So., DF, Stanford; Blake Bodily, Fr., MF, Washington; Handwalla Bwana, So., MF, Washington; Drake Callender, So., GK, California; Jose Carerra-Garcia, R-Sr., FW, California; Tomas Hilliard-Arce, Sr., DF, Stanford; Erik Holt, Jr., DF, UCLA; Brian Iloski, R-Sr., MF, UCLA; Foster Langsdorf, Sr., FW, Stanford; Drew Skundrich, Sr., MF, Stanford | Anderson Asiedu, Jr., MF, UCLA; Kyle Coffee, R-Jr., FW, Washington; Garret Jackson, Sr., DF, Washington; Jordan Jones, Sr., FW, Oregon State; Shinya Kadono, Jr., MF, California; Saif Kerawala, R-So., GK, Washington; Jalen Markey, R-Sr., DF, Oregon State; Jeroen Meefout, Sr., FW, San Diego State; Quentin Pearson, Jr., DF, Washington; Don Tchilao, Jr., FW, Oregon State; Sam Werner, R-Jr., MF, Stanford | Nico Corti, R-Sr., GK, Stanford; Eric Diaz, So., DF, Oregon State; Hassani Dotson, Jr., MF, Oregon State; Samuel Ebstein, Jr., FW, California; Justin Fiddes, Sr., DF, Washington; Eric Iloski, Fr., MF, UCLA; Josh Morton, Sr., DF, California; Matthew Powell, R-So., DF, UCLA; Ugo Rebecchini, Sr., MF, California; Paul Salcedo, Sr., FW, California; Winston Sorhaitz, R-Sr., FW, San Diego State |

== MLS SuperDraft ==
=== Draft picks ===
A total of seven players were drafted in the 2018 MLS SuperDraft.

| Round | Pick # | MLS team | Player | Position | College | Other |
|---|---|---|---|---|---|---|
| 1 | 2 | LA Galaxy | Tomas Hilliard-Arce | DF | Stanford | |
| 1 | 17 | Vancouver Whitecaps FC | Justin Fiddes | DF | Washington | |
| 2 | 40 | LA Galaxy | Drew Skundrich | MF | Stanford | |
| 3 | 47 | Los Angeles FC | Jordan Jones | FW | Oregon State | |
| 3 | 63 | Portland Timbers | Timmy Mueller | FW | Oregon State | |
| 4 | 72 | Colorado Rapids | Brian Iloski | MF | UCLA | |
| 4 | 84 | Chicago Fire | Josh Morton | DF | California | |

=== Homegrown contracts ===
| Original MLS team | Player | Position | College | Notes |
|---|---|---|---|---|
| Real Salt Lake | Corey Baird | FW | Stanford | |
| Seattle Sounders FC | Handwalla Bwana | FW | Washington | 2016 Pac-12 Freshman of the Year |
| Portland Timbers | Foster Langsdorf | FW | Stanford | |
| Vancouver Whitecaps FC | David Norman Jr. | MF | Oregon State | |

== See also ==
- 2017 NCAA Division I men's soccer season
