= 2016 Pac-12 Conference men's soccer season =

- League: NCAA Division I
- Sport: Soccer
- Duration: August, 2016 – November, 2016
- Teams: 6

2017 MLS SuperDraft
- Top draft pick: Abu Danladi, UCLA
- Picked by: Minnesota United FC, 1st overall

Regular season
- Champions: Stanford
- Runners-up: Washington
- Season MVP: José Hernández; Foster Langsdorf

Pac-12 Conference men's soccer seasons
- ← 2015 2017 →

2016 Pac-12 Conference men's soccer standings
| | Conf. | | | | | Overall |
| Team | W | | L | | T | W | | L | | T |
|---|---|---|---|---|---|---|---|---|---|---|
| No. 1 Stanford ‡ | 8 | – | 1 | – | 1 | 14 | – | 3 | – | 6 |
| No. 12 Washington + | 6 | – | 4 | – | 0 | 14 | – | 7 | – | 0 |
| San Diego State + | 4 | – | 3 | – | 3 | 9 | – | 4 | – | 6 |
| UCLA + | 4 | – | 5 | – | 1 | 10 | – | 8 | – | 2 |
| Oregon State | 3 | – | 5 | – | 2 | 7 | – | 8 | – | 3 |
| California | 1 | – | 8 | – | 1 | 5 | – | 10 | – | 2 |
‡-Conference champion + - Invited to the 2016 NCAA Division I Men's Soccer Championship; As of 13 December 2016; Rankings from NSCAA

The 2016 Pac-12 Conference men's soccer season was the 17th season of men's varsity soccer in the conference.

The Stanford Cardinal are the defending champions, by virtue of winning the regular season (there is no conference tournament). The Cardinal are also the defending NCAA champions.

== Changes from 2015 ==
- None

== Teams ==
=== Stadiums and locations ===
| Team | Location | Stadium | Capacity |
|---|---|---|---|
| California Golden Bears | Berkeley, California | Edwards Stadium | 22,000 |
| Oregon State Beavers | Corvallis, Oregon | Lorenz Field | 2,200 |
| San Diego State Aztecs | San Diego, California | SDSU Sports Deck | 1,000 |
| Stanford Cardinal | Stanford, California | Cagan Stadium | 4,000 |
| UCLA Bruins | Los Angeles, California | Drake Stadium | 7,000 |
| Washington Huskies | Seattle, Washington | Husky Soccer Stadium | 1,640 |

- Arizona, Arizona State, Colorado, Oregon, USC, Utah and Washington State do not sponsor men's soccer. San Diego State is an associated member.

== Regular season ==
=== Results ===
Each team plays every other conference team twice; once home and once away.

| Home/Away | CAL | OSU | SDSU | STA | UCLA | UW |
|---|---|---|---|---|---|---|
| California Golden Bears | | 0–1 | 0–1 | 1–2 | 3–4 | 1–2 |
| Oregon State Beavers | 2–2 | | 3–2 | 0–1 | 3–4 | 1–2 |
| San Diego State Aztecs | 1–0 | 1–1 | | 1–1 | 0–1 | 1–0 |
| Stanford Cardinal | 1–0 | 3–0 | 3–1 | | 3–0 | 0–1 |
| UCLA Bruins | 1–2 | 2–0 | 0–0 | 2–3 | | 0–4 |
| Washington Huskies | 2–1 | 0–1 | 0–1 | 0–1 | 1–0 | |

=== Rankings ===
==== National ====
Legend
| Increase in ranking |
| Decrease in ranking |
| Not ranked previous week |

| | | Pre | Wk 1 | Wk 2 | Wk 3 | Wk 4 | Wk 5 | Wk 6 | Wk 7 | Wk 8 | Wk 9 | Wk 10 | Wk 11 | Wk 12 | Final |
|---|---|---|---|---|---|---|---|---|---|---|---|---|---|---|---|
| California | C | RV | 22 | RV | RV | RV | RV | NR | | | | | | | |
| Oregon State | C | | | RV | NR | | | | | | | | | | |
| San Diego State | C | | 23 | 13 | 11 | 11 | 22 | 13 | 25 | RV | 22 | 21 | 16 | RV | RV |
| Stanford | C | 1 | 15 | 24 | 25 | 23 | RV | RV | 16 | 12 | 9 | 9 | 8 | 5 | 1 |
| UCLA | C | 16 | 9 | 8 | 7 | 6 | 13 | 19 | 17 | 24 | RV | RV | RV | RV | RV |
| Washington | C | | | RV | RV | RV | 16 | 16 | 22 | 17 | 16 | 11 | 14 | 14 | 12 |

==== Far West Regional ====
Legend
| Increase in ranking |
| Decrease in ranking |
| Not ranked previous week |

| | | Wk 1 | Wk 2 | Wk 3 | Wk 4 | Wk 5 | Wk 6 | Wk 7 | Wk 8 | Wk 9 | Wk 10 | Wk 11 | Wk 12 |
|---|---|---|---|---|---|---|---|---|---|---|---|---|---|
| California | C | 4 | NR | | 5 | 6 | NR | | | | | | |
| Oregon State | C | 9 | 5 | 10 | 4 | NR | | | | | | | |
| San Diego State | C | 3 | 2 | 2 | 1 | 4 | 1 | 4 | 6 | 2 | 3 | 2 | 2 |
| Stanford | C | 5 | 7 | 7 | 8 | NR | 4 | 1 | 1 | 1 | 1 | 1 | 1 |
| UCLA | C | 1 | 3 | 1 | 2 | 1 | 3 | 2 | 5 | 6 | 5 | 6 | 6 |
| Washington | C | 10 | 8 | 6 | 3 | 2 | 2 | 3 | 2 | 3 | 2 | 4 | 3 |

== Postseason ==
=== NCAA tournament ===
| Seed | Region | School | 1st round | 2nd round | 3rd round | Quarterfinals | Semifinals | Championship |
|---|---|---|---|---|---|---|---|---|
| 5 | 2 | Stanford | BYE | W, 2–0 vs. Pacific – (Stanford) | W, 1–0 vs. #12 Virginia – (Stanford) | W, 2–0 vs. #7 Louisville – (Louisville) | T, 0–0 ^{W, 10–9 PK} vs. #9 North Carolina – (Houston) | T, 0–0 ^{W, 5–4 PK} vs. #2 Wake Forest – (Houston) |
| 11 | 3 | Washington | BYE | W, 4–1 vs. New Mexico – (Seattle) | L, 1–2 vs. #6 Denver – (Denver) | | | |
| —N/a | 3 | San Diego State | T, 1–1 (L, 5–6 pen.) vs. UNLV – (San Diego) | | | | | |
| —N/a | 2 | UCLA | W, 4–2 vs. Colgate – (Los Angeles) | L, 1–2 ^{OT} vs. #7 Louisville – (Louisville) | | | | |

== All-Pac-12 awards and teams ==
2016 Pac-12 Men's Soccer Individual Awards
| Award | Recipient(s) |
| Player of the Year | José Hernández, MF, UCLA; Foster Langsdorf, MF, Stanford |
| Coach of the Year | Jeremy Gunn, Stanford |
| Defender of the Year | Tomas Hilliard-Arce, Stanford |
| Freshman of the Year | Handwalla Bwana, MF, Washington |

2016 Pac-12 Men's Soccer All-Conference Teams
| First Team | Second Team | Honorable Mention |
| Corey Baird, Stanford; Jose Carerra-Garcia, California; Andrew Epstein, Stanford; José Hernández, UCLA; Tomas Hilliard-Arce, Stanford; Foster Langsdorf, Stanford; Nick Lima , California; Justin Schmidt, Washington; Brian Nana-Sinkam, Stanford; Christian Thierjung, California; Jackson Yueil, UCLA | Seyi Adekoya, UCLA; Handwalla Bwana, Washington; Brian Iloski, UCLA; Jordan Jones, Oregon State; Timmy Mueller, Oregon State; Travis Nicklaw, San Diego St. Pablo Pelaez, San Diego St. Auden Schilder, Washington; Drew Skundrich, Stanford; Felix Vobejda, UCLA; Henry Wingo, Washington | Adam Allmaras, San Diego St. Michael Amick, UCLA; Matt Callahan, San Diego St. Kyle Coffee, Washington; Abu Danladi, UCLA; Erik Holt, UCLA; Casey Macias, San Diego St. Bryce Marion, Stanford; Jeroen Meefout, San Diego St. Paul Salcedo, California; Michael Sauers, San Diego St. |

== MLS SuperDraft ==
=== Total picks by school ===
| Team | Round 1 | Round 2 | Round 3 | Round 4 | Total |
|---|---|---|---|---|---|
| California | – | – | 1 | – | 1 |
| Oregon State | – | – | – | – | 0 |
| San Diego State | – | – | – | – | 0 |
| Stanford | 1 | – | – | – | 1 |
| UCLA | 2 | 1 | – | – | 3 |
| Washington | – | 1 | – | 1 | 2 |
| Total | 3 | 2 | 1 | 1 | 7 |

=== List of selections ===
| Round | Pick # | MLS team | Player | Position | College |
|---|---|---|---|---|---|
| 1 | 1 | Minnesota United FC | (Ghana) Abu Danladi | FW | UCLA |
| 1 | 6 | San Jose Earthquakes | (United States) Jackson Yueill | MF | UCLA |
| 1 | 22 | Atlanta United FC | (United States) Brian Nana-Sinkam | DF | Stanford |
| 2 | 32 | Portland Timbers | (United States) Michael Amick | DF | UCLA |
| 2 | 35 | Real Salt Lake | (United States) Justin Schmidt | DF | Washington |
| 3 | 50 | San Jose Earthquakes | (United States) Christian Thierjung | FW | California |
| 4 | 72 | San Jose Earthquakes | (United States) Auden Schilder | GK | Washington |

== See also ==
- 2016 NCAA Division I men's soccer season
- 2016 Pac-12 Conference women's soccer season
