= 2018 MLS SuperDraft =

College draft for soccer teams

General information
- Sport: Soccer
- Date: January 19, 2018
- Time: 11:00 a.m. ET
- Location: Philadelphia, Pennsylvania
- Network: MLSSoccer.com

Overview
- 81 total selections
- First selection: João Moutinho

The 2018 MLS SuperDraft was the nineteenth SuperDraft conducted by Major League Soccer. As customary, the SuperDraft was held in conjunction with the annual United Soccer Coaches convention. The 2018 UCS was held in Philadelphia, Pennsylvania between January 17–21, 2018. Rounds one and two of the SuperDraft were held on January 19, 2018. Rounds three and four of the 2018 SuperDraft were held via a conference call on January 21, 2018.

== Draft Notes ==
Expansion club Los Angeles FC selected Akron defender João Moutinho with the first overall pick. He was the second Akron player taken first overall, after Steve Zakuani in 2009, and the first Portugal native to go first. The LA Galaxy took Stanford defender Tomás Hilliard-Arce second, and LAFC then acquired the third pick from D.C. United in a trade and used it on Pacific defender Tristan Blackmon. It was the first SuperDraft in which defenders were taken with the first three picks. Four goalkeepers were selected in the first round, the most ever in a first round, beginning with Butler's Eric Dick at No. 13 to Sporting Kansas City. Of the 81 players selected, 44 had spent at least one season with a U.S. Soccer Development Academy club.

== Format ==
The SuperDraft format has remained constant throughout its history and closely resembles that of the NFL draft:

1. Any expansion teams receive the first picks. Los Angeles FC will enter the league as an expansion team in 2018.
2. Non-playoff clubs receive the next picks in reverse order of prior season finish.
3. Teams that made the MLS Cup Playoffs are then ordered by which round of the playoffs they are eliminated.
4. The winners of the MLS Cup are given the last selection, and the losers the penultimate selection.

== Player selection ==
=== Round 1 ===
Any player marked with a * is part of the Generation Adidas program.

Pick #	MLS team	Player	Position	College	PDL or NPSL affiliation	Signed
1	Los Angeles FC	(Portugal) João Moutinho*	Defender	Akron		(United States) Los Angeles FC
2	LA Galaxy	(United States) Tomas Hilliard-Arce	Defender	Stanford	Burlingame Dragons FC	(United States) LA Galaxy
3	Los Angeles FC (Note: No. 3: D.C. United → Los Angeles FC. January 19, 2018: Los Angeles FC acquired a first-round selection in the 2018 SuperDraft from D.C. United in exchange for $100,000 of General Allocation Money and $100,000 of Targeted Allocation Money.)	(United States) Tristan Blackmon	Defender	Pacific	Burlingame Dragons FC	(United States) Los Angeles FC
4	FC Dallas (Note: No. 4: Colorado Rapids → Montreal Impact → FC Dallas. January 19, 2018: FC Dallas acquired a first-round selection in the 2018 SuperDraft from Montreal Impact in exchange for $200,000 of General Allocation Money. On February 4, 2016, Montreal had acquired this first-round selection in the 2018 SuperDraft and general allocation money from Colorado Rapids in exchange for defender Eric Miller.)	(Ghana) Francis Atuahene*	Forward	Michigan	Michigan Bucks	(United States) FC Dallas
5	Chicago Fire (Note: No. 5: Minnesota United FC → Chicago Fire. January 19, 2018: Chicago Fire acquired a first-round selection in the 2018 SuperDraft Minnesota United FC in exchange for the #15 selection in the 2018 SuperDraft, $75,000 of General Allocation Money, $100,000 of Targeted Allocation Money, and goalkeeper Matt Lampson.)	(Spain) Jon Bakero	Forward	Wake Forest	Carolina Dynamo	(United States) Chicago Fire
6	Orlando City SC	(United States) Chris Mueller	Forward	Wisconsin	Chicago FC United	(United States) Orlando City SC
7	Minnesota United FC (Note: No. 7: Montreal Impact → Minnesota United FC. January 19, 2018: Minnesota United FC acquired a first-round selection in the 2018 SuperDraft from Montreal Impact in exchange for $150,000 of General Allocation Money.)	(United States) Mason Toye*	Forward	Indiana		(United States) Minnesota United FC
8	New England Revolution (Note: No. 8: Philadelphia Union → New England Revolution. August 3, 2016: New England Revolution acquired a first-round selection in the 2018 SuperDraft, general allocation money, and targeted allocation money from Philadelphia Union in exchange for a third-round selection in the 2018 SuperDraft and forward Charlie Davies.)	(United States) Brandon Bye	Defender	Western Michigan	Minneapolis City SC	(United States) New England Revolution
9	New England Revolution	(United States) Mark Segbers	Forward	Wisconsin	Chicago FC United	(United States) New England Revolution
10	Chicago Fire (Note: No. 10: Real Salt Lake → Chicago Fire. January 19, 2018: Chicago Fire acquired a first-round selection in the 2018 SuperDraft from Real Salt Lake in exchange for $85,000 of General Allocation Money.)	(England) Mo Adams*	Midfielder	Syracuse	Reading United AC	(United States) Chicago Fire
11	FC Dallas	(Ghana) Ema Twumasi*	Midfielder	Wake Forest	GPS Portland Phoenix	(United States) FC Dallas
12	San Jose Earthquakes	(France) Paul Marie	Midfielder	FIU	Reading United AC	(United States) San Jose Earthquakes
13	Sporting Kansas City	(United States) Eric Dick	Goalkeeper	Butler	OKC Energy U23	(United States) Sporting Kansas City
14	Atlanta United FC	(Republic of Ireland) Jon Gallagher	Forward	Notre Dame		(United States) Atlanta United FC
15	Minnesota United FC (Note: No. 15: Chicago Fire → Minnesota United FC. January 19, 2018: Minnesota United FC acquired this first-round selection in the 2018 SuperDraft, $75,000 of General Allocation Money, $100,000 of Targeted Allocation Money, and goalkeeper Matt Lampson from Chicago Fire in exchange for the #5 selection in the 2018 SuperDraft.)	(United States) Wyatt Omsberg	Defender	Dartmouth	Seacoast United Phantoms	(United States) Minnesota United FC
16	New York Red Bulls	(United States) Brian White	Forward	Duke	New York Red Bulls U-23	(United States) New York Red Bulls II
17	Vancouver Whitecaps FC	(United States) Justin Fiddes	Defender	Washington	Southern California Surf	(Canada) Vancouver Whitecaps FC
18	Sporting Kansas City (Note: No. 18: Portland Timbers → Sporting Kansas City. February 3, 2017: Sporting Kansas City acquired a first-round selection in the 2018 SuperDraft and $50,000 in general allocation money from Portland Timbers in exchange for defender Lawrence Olum.)	(United States) Graham Smith	Defender	Denver	Colorado Rapids U-23	(United States) Sporting Kansas City
19	New York City FC	(United States) Jeff Caldwell	Goalkeeper	Virginia	Colorado Rapids U-23	(United States) New York City FC
20	Houston Dynamo	(United States) Michael Nelson	Goalkeeper	SMU	OKC Energy U23	(United States) Houston Dynamo
21	Columbus Crew SC	(United States) Ben Lundgaard	Goalkeeper	Virginia Tech	New York Red Bulls U-23	(United States) Columbus Crew SC
22	Seattle Sounders FC	(El Salvador) Alex Roldan	Midfielder	Seattle	OSA FC	(United States) Seattle Sounders FC
23	Minnesota United FC (Note: No. 23: Toronto FC → Minnesota United FC. January 19, 2018: Minnesota United FC acquired a first-round selection in the 2018 SuperDraft from Toronto FC in exchange for $50,000 of General Allocation Money and a second-round selection in the 2018 SuperDraft.)	(United States) Carter Manley	Defender	Duke	D.C. United U-23	(United States) Minnesota United FC

=== Round 2 ===
Any player marked with a * is part of the Generation Adidas program.

Pick #	MLS team	Player	Position	College	PDL or NPSL affiliation	Signed
24	Los Angeles FC	(Spain) Pol Calvet	Midfielder	Pittsburgh		Retired
25	Colorado Rapids (Note: No. 25: LA Galaxy → Colorado Rapids. December 13, 2016: Colorado Rapids acquired a second-round selection in the 2018 SuperDraft and a first-round selection in the 2017 MLS SuperDraft from LA Galaxy in exchange for midfielder Jermaine Jones.)	(United States) Alan Winn	Forward	North Carolina	Tobacco Road FC	(United States) Nashville SC
26	Vancouver Whitecaps FC (Note: No. 26: D.C. United → Vancouver Whitecaps FC. January 8, 2018: Vancouver Whitecaps FC acquired a second-round selection in the 2018 SuperDraft from D.C. United in exchange for goalkeeper David Ousted.)	(United States) Lucas Stauffer	Defender	Creighton	Des Moines Menace	(United States) New York Red Bulls II
27	Colorado Rapids	(Haiti) Frantzdy Pierrot	Forward	Coastal Carolina	Reading United AC	(Belgium) Royal Excel Mouscron
28	Toronto FC (Note: No. 28: Minnesota United FC → Toronto FC. January 19, 2018: Toronto FC acquired a second-round selection in the 2018 SuperDraft and $50,000 of General Allocation Money from Minnesota United FC in exchange for a first-round selection in the 2018 MLS SuperDraft)	(Germany) Tim Kübel	Defender	Louisville		(Canada) Toronto FC II
29	FC Dallas (Note: No. 29: Orlando City → FC Dallas. August 4, 2016: FC Dallas acquired this selection, originally a conditional third-round selection, in the 2018 SuperDraft from Orlando City SC in exchange for the MLS rights to defender Mikey Ambrose.)	(Venezuela) Mauro Cichero	Forward	SMU	OKC Energy U23	(United States) Charleston Battery
30	San Jose Earthquakes (Note: No. 30: Montreal Impact → San Jose Earthquakes. July 13, 2017: San Jose Earthquakes acquired a second-round selection in the 2018 SuperDraft from Montreal Impact in exchange for defender Shaun Francis.)	(United States) Danny Musovski	Forward	UNLV	FC Tucson	(United States) San Jose Earthquakes
31	New York Red Bulls (Note: No. 31: Philadelphia Union → New York Red Bulls. February 8, 2017: New York Red Bulls acquired a second-round selection in the 2018 SuperDraft from Philadelphia Union in exchange for the MLS rights to midfielder Adam Najem.)	(Philippines) Niko de Vera	Defender	Akron	Portland Timbers U23	(United States) New York Red Bulls II
32	Columbus Crew SC (Note: No. 32: New England Revolution → Columbus Crew. May 12, 2016: Columbus Crew SC acquired a second-round selection in the 2018 SuperDraft, a first-round selection in the 2017 MLS SuperDraft, an international roster slot for the 2016 season, general allocation money, and targeted allocation money from New England Revolution in exchange for forward Kei Kamara.)	(Ghana) Edward Opoku*	Forward	Virginia	AC Connecticut	(United States) Columbus Crew SC
33	Real Salt Lake	(United States) Ricky Lopez-Espin	Forward	Creighton	Tampa Bay Rowdies U23	(United States) Real Salt Lake
34	FC Dallas	(United States) Chris Lema	Midfielder	Georgetown	New York Red Bulls U-23	(United States) New York Red Bulls II
35	San Jose Earthquakes	(Senegal) Mohamed Thiaw	Forward	Louisville	Portland Timbers U23	(United States) San Jose Earthquakes
36	Atlanta United FC (Note: No. 36: Sporting Kansas City → Atlanta United. December 10, 2017: Atlanta United FC acquired a second-round selection in the 2018 SuperDraft, midfielder Kévin Oliveira, and defender Tyler Pasher from Sporting Kansas City in exchange for forward Kenwyne Jones, goalkeeper Alexander Tambakis and a fourth-round selection in the 2021 MLS SuperDraft.)	(England) Oliver Shannon	Midfielder	Clemson		(United States) Atlanta United FC
37	Atlanta United FC	(Germany) Gordon Wild*	Forward	Maryland		(United States) Atlanta United FC
38	Chicago Fire	(Costa Rica) Diego Campos	Midfielder	Clemson	SIMA Águilas	(United States) Chicago Fire
39	New York Red Bulls	(United States) Tom Barlow	Forward	Wisconsin	Chicago FC United	(United States) New York Red Bulls II
40	LA Galaxy (Note: No. 40: Vancouver Whitecaps FC → LA Galaxy. December 15, 2017: LA Galaxy acquired a second-round selection in the 2018 SuperDraft from Vancouver Whitecaps FC in exchange for goalkeeper Brian Rowe.)	(United States) Drew Skundrich	Midfielder	Stanford	Burlingame Dragons FC	(United States) Bethlehem Steel
41	Minnesota United FC (Note: No. 41: Portland Timbers → Minnesota United. December 20, 2016: Minnesota United FC acquired a second-round selection in the 2018 SuperDraft from Portland Timbers in exchange for goalkeeper Jeff Attinella.)	(United States) Xavier Gomez	Forward	Omaha		(United States) Chicago FC United
42	New York City FC	(Grenada) A. J. Paterson	Midfielder	Wright State	SW Florida Adrenaline	(United States) Bethlehem Steel
43	Houston Dynamo	(United States) Mac Steeves	Forward	Providence	FC Boston	(United States) Houston Dynamo
44	Columbus Crew SC	(United States) Jake Rozhansky	Midfielder	Maryland	D.C. United U-23	(Israel) Maccabi Netanya
45	Seattle Sounders FC	(Norway) Markus Fjørtoft	Defender	Duke	New York Red Bulls U-23	(New Zealand) Southern United
46	Toronto FC	(United States) Drew Shepherd	Goalkeeper	Western Michigan	Michigan Bucks	(Canada) Toronto FC II

=== Round 3 ===
Pick #	MLS team	Player	Position	College	PDL or NPSL affiliation	Signed
47	Los Angeles FC	(United States) Jordan Jones	Forward	Oregon State	Lane United	(United States) RGVFC Toros
48	LA Galaxy	(United States) Nate Shultz	Defender	Akron	Portland Timbers U23s	(United States) LA Galaxy II
49	Chicago Fire (Note: No. 49: D.C. United → Chicago Fire. July 29, 2016: Chicago Fire acquired a third-round selection in the 2018 SuperDraft and targeted allocation money from D.C. United in exchange for Kennedy Igboananike.)	(New Zealand) Elliot Collier	Forward	Loyola Chicago	Michigan Bucks	(United States) Chicago Fire
50	Colorado Rapids	(United States) Thomas Olsen	Goalkeeper	San Diego	FC Tucson	(United States) Las Vegas Lights
51	Real Salt Lake (Note: No. 51: Minnesota United → Real Salt Lake. February 3, 2017: Real Salt Lake acquired a third-round selection in the 2018 SuperDraft and $50,000 in general allocation money from Minnesota United FC in exchange for an international roster slot for the 2017 MLS season.)	PASS				
52	New York City FC (Note: No. 52: Orlando City → New York City FC. December 18, 2017: New York City FC acquired a third-round selection in the 2018 SuperDraft from Orlando City SC in exchange for defender R. J. Allen.)	(United States) Alex Bumpus	Defender	Kentucky		Unsigned
53	Montreal Impact	(Japan) Ken Krolicki	Midfielder	Michigan State	K-W United FC	(Canada) Montreal Impact
54	Philadelphia Union	(United States) Mike Catalano	Midfielder	Wisconsin	Reading United | Chicago FC United	(United States) Bethlehem Steel
55	Philadelphia Union (Note: No. 55: New England Revolution → Philadelphia Union. August 3, 2016: Philadelphia Union acquired a third-round selection in the 2018 SuperDraft and forward Charlie Davies from New England Revolution in exchange for a first-round selection in the 2018 SuperDraft, general allocation money, and targeted allocation money.)	(United States) Aidan Apodaca	Forward	California Baptist	Southern California Seahorses	(United States) Bethlehem Steel
56	Real Salt Lake	PASS				
57	FC Dallas	(Germany) Amir Šašivarević	Defender	Grand Canyon	Lane United	(United States) Ogden City SC
58	San Jose Earthquakes	(United States) Kevin Partida	Midfielder	UNLV	FC Tucson	(United States) Reno 1868
59	Houston Dynamo (Note: No. 59: Sporting Kansas City → Houston Dynamo. January 7, 2016: Houston Dynamo acquired a third-round selection in the 2018 SuperDraft, a second-round selection in the 2017 MLS SuperDraft, and future considerations from Sporting Kansas City in exchange for midfielder Brad Davis.)	(Guatemala) Pablo Aguilar	Midfielder	Virginia	Reading United AC	(United States) RGVFC Toros
60	Montreal Impact (Note: No. 60: Atlanta United → Montreal Impact. December 11, 2016: Montreal Impact acquired a third-round selection in the 2018 SuperDraft from Atlanta United FC in exchange for forward Romario Williams.)	PASS				
61	Portland Timbers (Note: No. 61: Chicago Fire → Portland Timbers. August 11, 2017: Portland Timbers acquired a conditional third-round selection in the 2018 SuperDraft and the #19 spot in the Allocation Order from Chicago Fire in exchange for the #6 spot in the Allocation Order. Chicago used the allocation spot to sign goalkeeper Richard Sánchez, who appeared in 2 games in the 2017 MLS season. Had Sanchez appeared in five or more games Portland would have instead received Chicago's natural second-round selection.)	(United States) Caleb Duvernay	Defender	NC State	North Carolina FC U23	(United States) North Carolina FC U23
62	Vancouver Whitecaps FC (Note: No. 62: New York Red Bulls → Vancouver Whitecaps FC. Trade details needed. As of December 21, 2017, the MLS website states that Vancouver acquired this pick from New York as part of a trade completed on August 6, 2015. However, no trade between the clubs was announced in 2015.)	(New Zealand) Cory Brown	Defender	Xavier	Michigan Bucks	(United States) Fresno FC
63	Portland Timbers (Note: No. 63: Vancouver Whitecaps FC → Real Salt Lake → Portland Timbers. December 15, 2017: Portland Timbers acquired a third-round selection in the 2018 SuperDraft from Real Salt Lake in exchange for the MLS rights to defender Taylor Peay. On August 9, 2017, Real Salt Lake had acquired this third-round selection in the 2018 SuperDraft from Vancouver Whitecaps FC in exchange for defender Aaron Maund.)	(United States) Timmy Mueller	Forward	Oregon State	Portland Timbers U23s	(Switzerland) SR Delémont
64	Portland Timbers	(New Zealand) Stuart Holthusen	Forward	Akron		Unsigned
65	New York City FC	PASS				
66	Houston Dynamo	(United States) Sheldon Sullivan	Defender	Virginia	Reading United AC	(United States) RGVFC Toros
67	Columbus Crew SC	(United States) Luis Argudo	Midfielder	Wake Forest	Carolina Dynamo	(United States) Columbus Crew SC
68	Seattle Sounders FC	(Panama) Chris Bared	Defender	Villanova		Unsigned
69	Toronto FC	(Jamaica) Andre Morrison	Defender	Hartford	Long Island Rough Riders	Unsigned

=== Round 4 ===
Pick #	MLS team	Player	Position	College	PDL or NPSL affiliation	Signed
70	Atlanta United FC (Note: No. 70: Los Angeles FC → Atlanta United. December 10, 2017: Atlanta United FC acquired a fourth-round selection in the 2018 SuperDraft from Los Angeles FC in exchange for an international roster slot for the 2018 season.)	(United States) Paul Christensen	Goalkeeper	Portland	Seattle Sounders FC U-23	(United States) Atlanta United 2
71	D.C. United (Note: No. 71: LA Galaxy → D.C. United. December 12, 2016: D.C. United acquired a fourth-round selection in the 2018 SuperDraft from LA Galaxy in exchange for midfielder Miguel Aguilar and a fourth-round selection in the 2019 SuperDraft.)	(Brazil) Afonso Pinheiro	Forward	Albany	FC Tucson	(Brazil) Batatais
72	Colorado Rapids (Note: No. 72: D.C. United → Colorado Rapids. February 1, 2016: Colorado Rapids acquired a fourth-round selection, originally a conditional selection, in the 2018 SuperDraft and targeted allocation money from D.C. United in exchange for midfielder Marcelo Sarvas.)	(United States) Brian Iloski	Midfielder	UCLA	San Diego Zest FC	(Poland) Legia Warsaw
73	Colorado Rapids	(United States) Niki Jackson	Forward	Grand Canyon		(United States) Colorado Rapids
74	D.C. United (Note: No. 74: Minnesota United → D.C. United. January 3, 2017: D.C. United acquired a fourth-round selection in the 2018 SuperDraft from Minnesota United FC in exchange for midfielder Collin Martin.)	(Brazil) Rafael Andrade Santos	Midfielder	VCU	SIMA Águilas	(United States) SIMA Águilas
75	Sporting Kansas City (Note: No. 75: Orlando City → Sporting Kansas City. August 3, 2016: Sporting Kansas City acquired a fourth-round selection in the 2018 SuperDraft from Orlando City SC in exchange for the MLS rights to midfielder Tony Rocha.)	(United States) Will Bagrou	Forward	Mercer	Seattle Sounders FC U-23	(United States) Birmingham Hammers
76	Montreal Impact	PASS				
77	Philadelphia Union	(United States) Matt Danilack	Midfielder	Dartmouth	GPS Portland Phoenix	Unsigned
78	New England Revolution	(Guatemala) Nicolas Samayoa	Defender	Florida Gulf Coast		(United States) New England Revolution
79	Real Salt Lake	PASS				
80	FC Dallas	(United States) Noah Franke	Midfielder	Creighton	Tampa Bay Rowdies U23	(United States) Pittsburgh Riverhounds
81	San Jose Earthquakes	PASS				
82	Sporting Kansas City	(United States) Wilfred Williams	Defender	Oakland	Myrtle Beach Mutiny	(United States) Detroit City FC
83	New York Red Bulls (Note: No. 83: Atlanta United → New York Red Bulls. March 1, 2017: New York Red Bulls acquired a fourth-round selection in the 2018 SuperDraft from Atlanta United FC in exchange for goalkeeper Kyle Reynish.)	(United States) Jared Stroud	Midfielder	Colgate	New York Red Bulls U-23	(United States) New York Red Bulls II
84	Chicago Fire	(United States) Josh Morton	Defender	California	Burlingame Dragons FC	(United States) Tulsa Roughnecks
85	New York Red Bulls	(Spain) Jose Aguinaga	Forward	Rider	New York Red Bulls U-23	(United States) New York Red Bulls II
86	Vancouver Whitecaps FC	PASS				
87	Portland Timbers	(Guinea) Mamadou Guirassy	Forward	NJIT	Jersey Express	(France) USL Dunkerque
88	New York City FC	PASS				
89	Houston Dynamo	(United States) Manny Padilla	Defender	San Francisco	San Francisco City FC	(United States) RGVFC Toros
90	LA Galaxy (Note: No. 90: Columbus Crew → LA Galaxy. December 13, 2017: LA Galaxy acquired a fourth-round selection in the 2018 SuperDraft from Columbus Crew SC in exchange for goalkeeper Jon Kempin.)	PASS				
91	D.C. United (Note: No. 91: Seattle Sounders FC → D.C. United. August 7, 2017: D.C. United acquired a fourth-round selection in the 2018 SuperDraft from Seattle Sounders FC in exchange for forward Lamar Neagle.)	PASS				
92	Toronto FC	(United States) Ben White	Defender	Gonzaga	Portland Timbers U23s	Unsigned

=== Other 2018 SuperDraft Trade Notes ===
- On December 23, 2016, Columbus Crew SC acquired a second-round selection in the 2018 SuperDraft from Atlanta United FC in exchange for the MLS rights to defender Greg Garza. Trade terms stated that if Garza started a minimum of 12 MLS regular-season games in 2017 the SuperDraft pick would be converted to General Allocation Money instead of the SuperDraft pick. Garza met this threshold and Columbus received General Allocation Money.
- On March 30, 2017, Vancouver Whitecaps FC acquired a conditional first-round selection in the 2018 SuperDraft, midfielder Tony Tchani, $225,000 of targeted allocation money, and $75,000 of general allocation money from Columbus Crew SC in exchange for forward Kekuta Manneh. The traded SuperDraft pick was contingent on Columbus signing Manneh to a contract extending beyond the 2017 MLS season and would have been Columbus's natural selection. However, in December 2017 Manneh instead signed with Pachuca of Liga MX. Trade terms also stated that Vancouver would receive additional general allocation money if Manneh is traded by Columbus prior to December 31, 2018, and would have retained a percentage of any future transfer fee if Manneh was transferred outside of MLS.

== Notable undrafted players ==
=== Homegrown players ===
Original MLS team	Player	Position	College	Conference	Notes
Montreal Impact	Jason Beaulieu	Goalkeeper	New Mexico	Conference USA	
Real Salt Lake	Corey Baird	Forward	Stanford	Pac-12	
Seattle Sounders FC	Handwalla Bwana	Forward	Washington	Pac-12	2016 Pac-12 Freshman of the Year
FC Dallas	Jordan Cano	Defender	SMU	American	2017 AAC Defender of the Year
Real Salt Lake	Aaron Herrera	Defender	New Mexico	Conference USA	2017 C-USA Defender of the Year
Portland Timbers	Foster Langsdorf	Forward	Stanford	Pac-12	
Chicago Fire	Grant Lillard	Defender	Indiana	Big Ten	2017 Big Ten Defender of the Year
San Jose Earthquakes	JT Marcinkowski	Goalkeeper	Georgetown	Big East	2017 Big East Men's Soccer Tournament MVP
Vancouver Whitecaps FC	David Norman Jr.	Midfielder	Oregon State	Pac-12	
New York Red Bulls	Kevin Politz	Defender	Wake Forest	ACC	2017 ACC Defender of the Year
FC Dallas	Kris Reaves	Defender	Portland	West Coast	
FC Dallas	Brandon Servania	Midfielder	Wake Forest	ACC	

=== Players who signed outside of MLS ===
Player	Position	College	Conference	Team	League	Notes
Greg Boehme	Midfielder	VCU	Atlantic 10	Richmond Kickers	United Soccer League	
Harry Cooksley	Midfielder	St. John's	Big East	Mallorca	Segunda División B	
Nico Corti	Goalkeeper	Stanford	Pac-12	Rio Grande Valley FC Toros	United Soccer League	
Fabio De Sousa	Forward	Rutgers–Newark	NJAC	Penn FC	United Soccer League	
Bryce Marion	Midfielder	Stanford	Pac-12	Rio Grande Valley FC Toros	United Soccer League	
Nico Matern	Midfielder	Indiana Wesleyan	Crossroads	Indy Eleven	United Soccer League	
Koby Osei-Wusu	Midfielder	George Washington	Atlantic 10	Richmond Kickers	United Soccer League	

== Summary ==
=== Selections by college athletic conference ===
Conference	Round 1	Round 2	Round 3	Round 4	Total
NCAA Division I conferences
ACC	8	8	4	0	20
America East	0	0	1	1	2
American	1	1	0	0	2
Atlantic 10	0	0	0	1	1
Atlantic Sun	0	0	0	2	2
Big East	1	4	2	1	8
Big Ten	4	3	2	0	9
Conference USA	1	0	1	0	2
Horizon	0	1	0	1	2
Ivy	1	0	0	1	2
MAAC	0	0	1	0	1
Mid-American	2	2	2	0	6
Missouri Valley	0	0	1	0	1
Pac-12	2	1	2	2	7
Patriot	0	0	0	1	1
SoCon	0	0	0	1	1
Summit	1	1	0	0	2
Sun Belt	0	1	0	1	2
WAC	1	1	2	1	5
West Coast	1	0	1	3	5
NCAA Division II conferences
Pacific West	0	0	1	0	1

- NCAA Division I conferences with no draft picks: Big South, Colonial and Northeast

=== Schools with multiple draft selections ===
Selections	Schools
4	Akron, Virginia, Wisconsin
3	Creighton, Duke, Wake Forest
2	Clemson, Dartmouth, Grand Canyon, Louisville, Maryland, Oregon State, SMU, Stanford, UNLV, Western Michigan

== See also ==
- 2017 NCAA Division I men's soccer season
- 2018 NWSL College Draft
