= 2016 NCAA Division I men's soccer championship game =

NCAA Division I men's soccer championship game
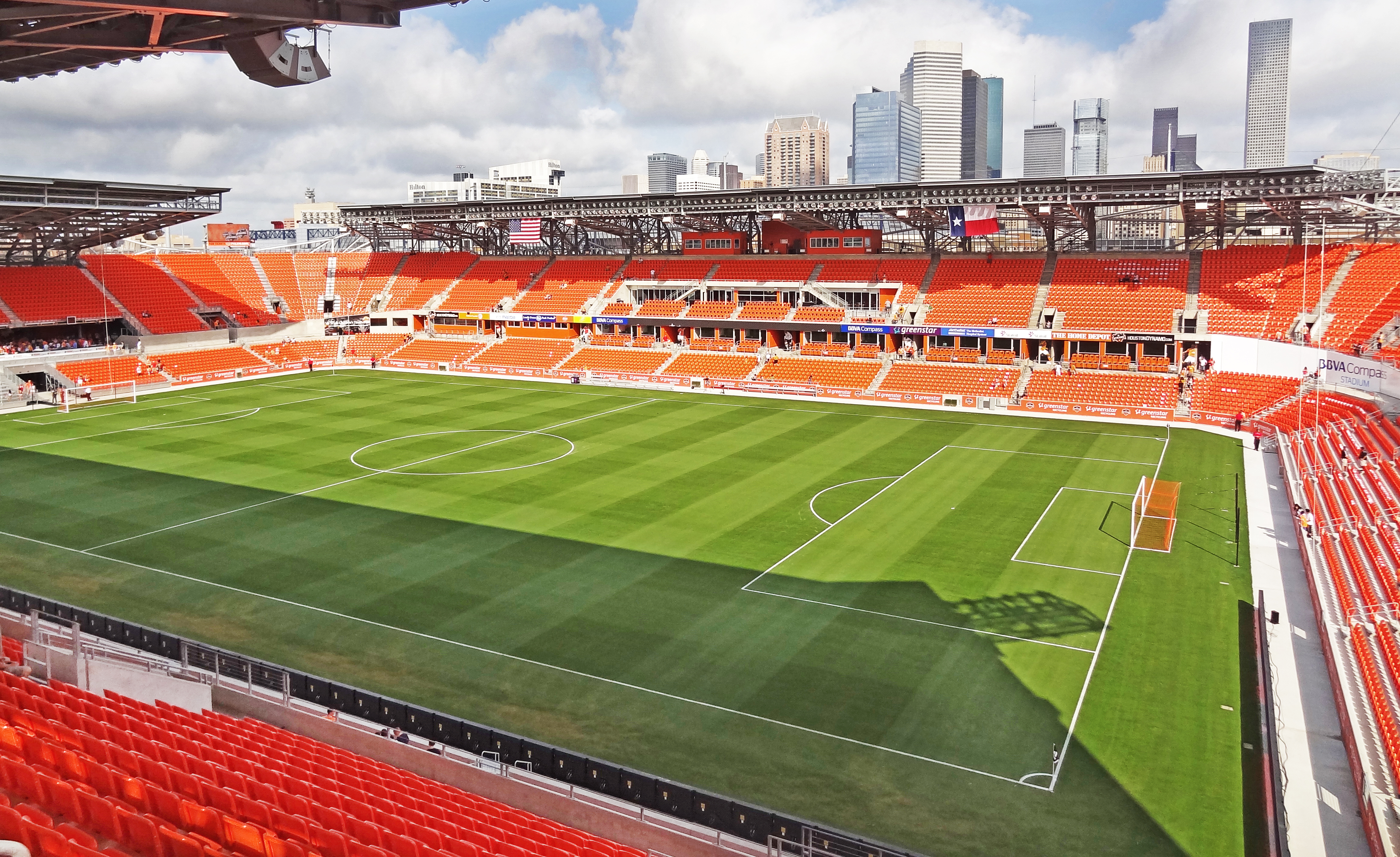
- Compass Stadium hosted the match
- Event: 2016 NCAA Division I Men's Soccer Championship
Wake Forest	Stanford
ACC	Pac-12
0	0
- Stanford won 5–4 on penalties
- Date: December 11, 2016
- Venue: BBVA Compass Stadium, Houston, Texas
- College Cup Most Outstanding Player(s): Andrew Epstein, Stanford (Defense); Ian Harkes, Wake Forest (Offense)
- Referee: Mark Kadlecik
- Attendance: 6,315
- Weather: Rain showers and 71 °F (22 °C)

The 2016 NCAA Division I men's soccer championship game was the final game of the 2016 NCAA Division I Men's Soccer Championship, determining the national champion for the 2016 NCAA Division I men's soccer season. The match was played on December 11, 2016, at BBVA Compass Stadium in Houston, Texas, a soccer-specific stadium that is home to Major League Soccer club, Houston Dynamo. Stanford of the Pac-12 Conference won the match, and successfully defended their national championship. Stanford defeated Wake Forest of the Atlantic Coast Conference. The crowd of 6,315 saw the match decided on penalty kicks, where Stanford prevailed on a 5–4 scoreline, following a 0–0 draw in regulation and overtime. The title was Stanford's second ever title, in their fourth-ever appearance. It was Wake Forest's second appearance in the final.

Both teams were seeded in the NCAA Tournament, meaning they bypassed the first round of the tournament, and entered into the second round of play. Wake Forest was seeded second in the tournament, while Stanford was seeded fifth. Wake Forest and Stanford entered the tournament as their respective conference champions. Wake Forest had won their first ACC Men's Soccer Tournament since 1989, and their second altogether. The Pac-12 Conference does not have a conference tournament, so the regular season champions are also crowned the conference champions. Stanford won their third-straight Pac-12 title, and their fourth title overall. Wake Forest secured its place in the final by defeating Coastal Carolina, SIU Edwardsville, Virginia Tech and Denver. Stanford reached the final with victories over Pacific, Virginia, Louisville, and North Carolina.

== Road to the final ==
The NCAA Division I Men's Soccer Tournament, sometimes known as the College Cup, is an American intercollegiate soccer tournament conducted by the National Collegiate Athletic Association (NCAA), and determines the Division I men's national champion. The tournament has been formally held since 1959, when it was an eight-team tournament. Since then, the tournament has expanded to 48 teams, in which every Division I conference tournament champion is allocated a berth. It was Wake Forest's first appearance since 2007, which they won. Stanford entered the final as the defending champion, winning their first ever national title in their first NCAA final appearance. It was the Cardinal's fourth NCAA championship appearance, finishing as runners-up in 1998 and 2002.

=== Wake Forest ===
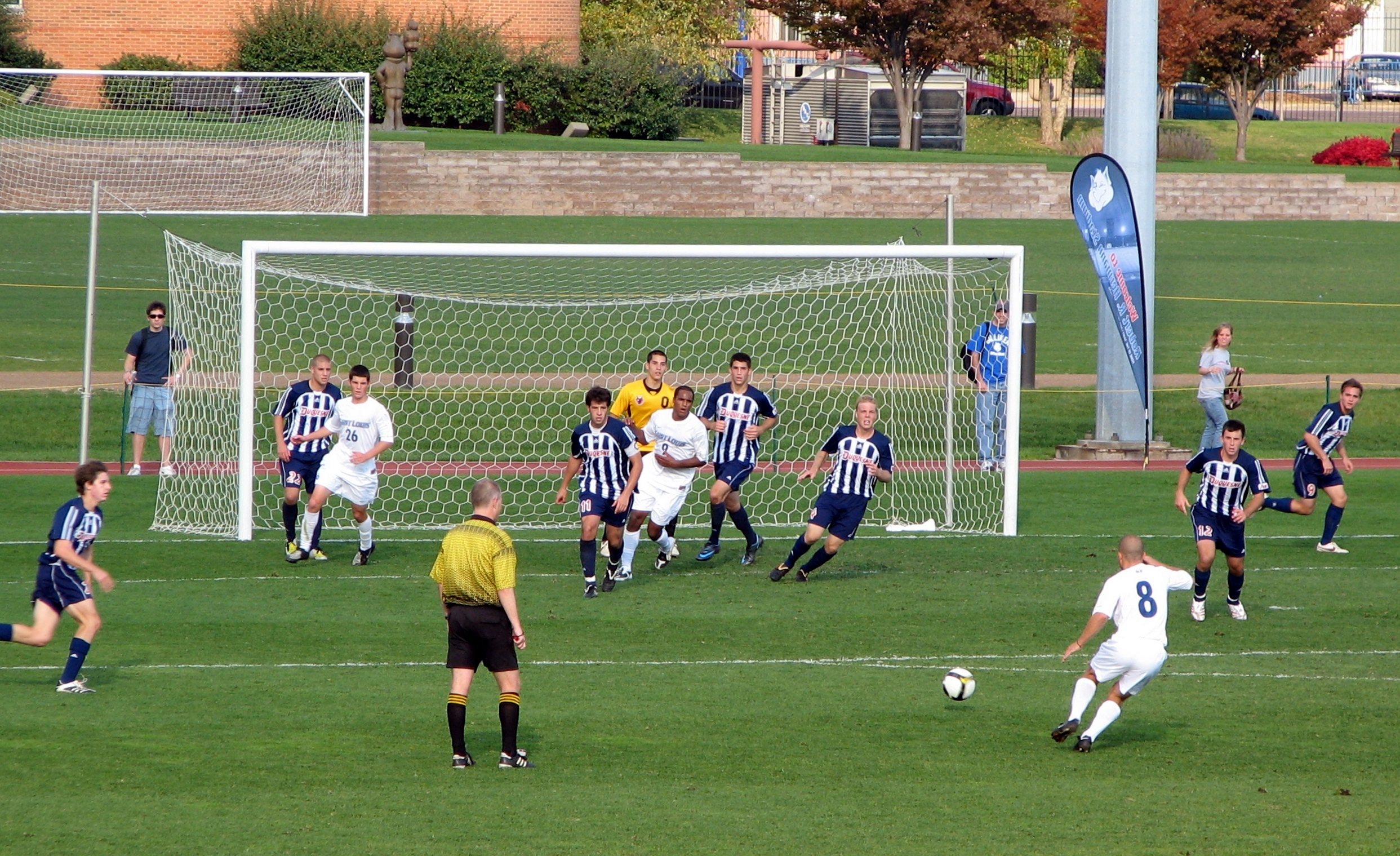
Wake Forest lost their home opener to Saint Louis (Saint Louis soccer pictured).

The Wake Forest Demon Deacons entered the NCAA Tournament as the Atlantic Coast Conference regular season champions, the Atlantic Division divisional champions as well as the conference tournament champions. The Demon Deacons amassed a conference record of five wins, one loss and two draws (5–1–2), and an overall regular season record of twelve wins, two losses and three draws (12–2–3). The Deacons began the season ranked fifth nationally, but suffered a shock 1–0 home loss to the unranked Saint Louis Billikens in their season opener. The loss caused the Demon Deacons to fall from fifth in the national polls to 21st. However, following the home loss to the Billikens, Wake Forest went on a four-match winning streak, and a nine-match undefeated streak. During this run, Wake Forest picked up notable victories against the 17th-ranked Virginia Cavaliers and two major road victories at Duke and Davidson.

During this win streak, the Deacons ascended from number 21 in the nation, to reach number 10 in the nation. Their nine-match undefeated streak ended with a 1–0 away loss at number five, Clemson. The Deacons rebounded from the loss by picking up a critical away point by tying the top-ranked Notre Dame, 2–2. Despite failing to beat either Clemson or Notre Dame, Wake Forest jumped in the NSCAA polls from eleventh to seventh. Following the loss at Clemson and the draw at Notre Dame, the Deacons would go on to win their next four matches. This included a home win against the then-second ranked, Louisville, a major non-conference away win at number 21, South Carolina, as well as an ACC conference-play win at home against then-number 18, Boston College. The Deacons concluded the regular season with a 1–1 road draw at the sixth-ranked Syracuse on October 28.

Wake Forest qualified for the 2016 ACC Men's Soccer Tournament as the number two seed. The Deacons earned a bye to the quarterfinals of the ACC Tournament where they hosted Notre Dame on November 6. A 74th-minute goal from Wake Forest midfielder, Jacori Hayes, proved to be the difference in the match, giving the Deacons a 1–0 win over the Irish. In the semifinals, Wake Forest hosted the three-seed, Louisville. Wake Forest struck first in the match, with Hayden Partain netting the opening goal of the contest in the 29th minute. Louisville's Tim Kübel scored on the near side of the Wake Forest defense with 50 seconds remaining in regulation, in order to force sudden death overtime. Ninety seconds into the first overtime period, Wake Forest's Jon Bakero lead a counterattack and fed a pass to striker, Ema Twumasi, who scored the golden goal to allow the Deacons to advance to the ACC Championship.

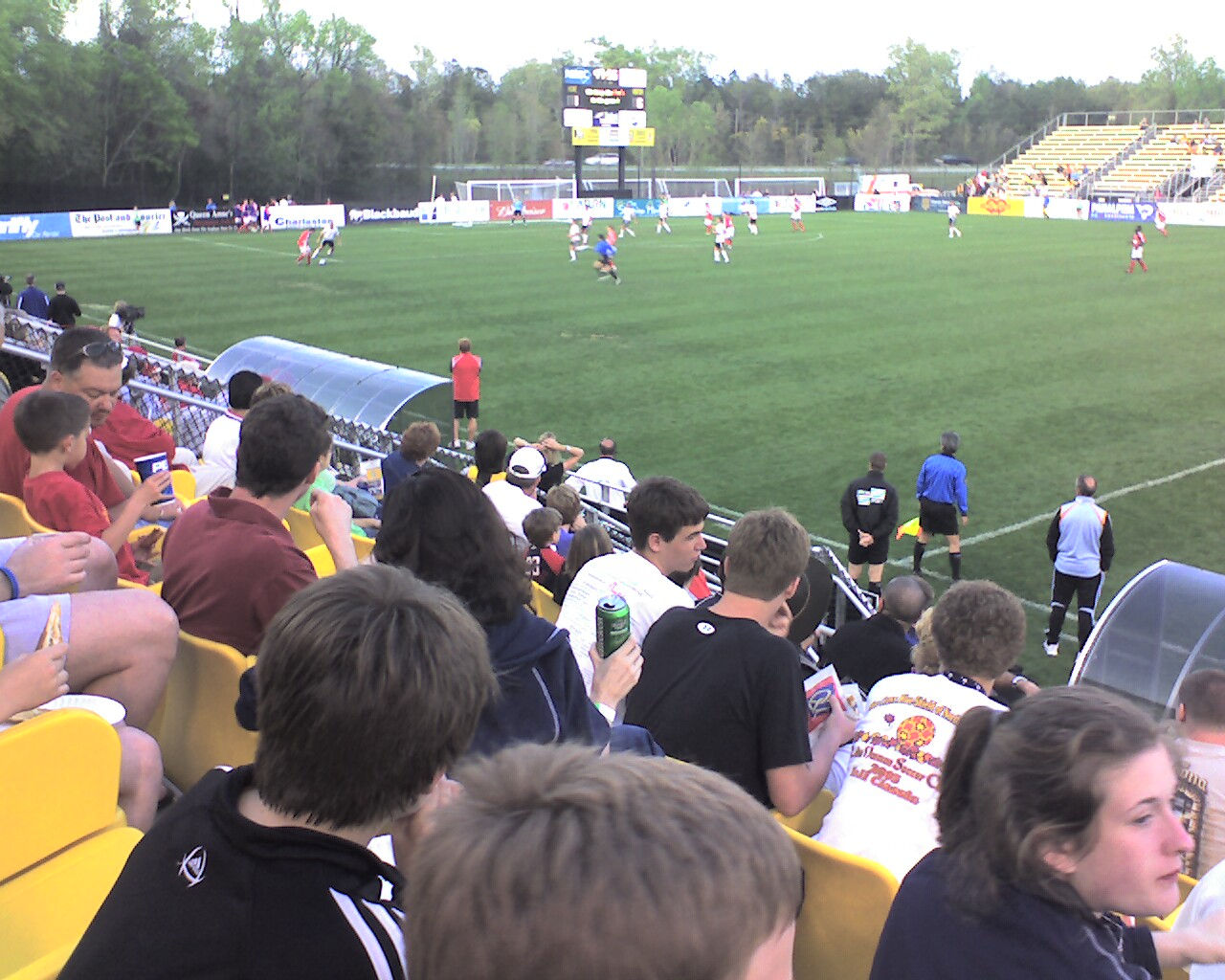
Wake Forest earned a 3–1 victory over Clemson at MUSC Health Stadium to win the ACC Final.

Wake Forest played against Clemson in the 2016 ACC Men's Soccer Championship Game. The match was held at the neutral site, MUSC Health Stadium in Charleston, South Carolina. The soccer-specific stadium serves regularly as the home ground for United Soccer League side, Charleston Battery. In the match, the Deacons roared out to a quick start, scoring three goals in the first half. Deacons captain, Ian Harkes, the son of former U.S. international, John Harkes, scored the opening goal in 24th minute. Nine minutes later, Partain netted a second goal to give the Deacons a 2–0 lead. Shortly before halftime, Steven Echvarria scored a third goal for Wake Forest to give the Deacons a 3–0 lead going into halftime. In the second half Clemson defender, Tanner Dieterich, scored a consolation goal to prevent a shutout, but the 3–1 scoreline proved to be the final result. It was Wake Forest's first ACC championship since 1989.

The ACC title gave the Deacons an automatic berth in the 2016 NCAA Tournament. The Deacons earned the number two overall seed in the tournament, and thus, earned a bye to the second round of the competition. Wake Forest played Coastal Carolina in the second round, where they advanced by winning 2–0 over the Chanticleers. Luis Argudo and Hayden Partain scored the Deacons' two goals of the match. Wake Forest hosted SIU Edwardsville in the Sweet Sixteen of the tournament, where the Deacons won 2–1. Wake Forest roared out to a quick start thanks to a third-minute goal by Bakero; however, SIU Edwardsville tied the match thanks to a goal by Austin Ledbetter in the 41st minute. Bakero scored a second half goal for the Deacons to secure victory and send Wake Forest to the quarterfinals. There, the Deacons hosted fellow ACC rival, Virginia Tech, who were making their first NCAA quarterfinal and overall tournament appearance since 2007. In front of 3,410 people at Spry Stadium, Wake Forest's Twumasi two late goals to give the Deacons a 2–0 victory over the Hokies to send them into the College Cup.

Wake Forest played against the sixth-seeded Denver in the semifinals. Denver, who had their best collegiate campaign since 1970, had not lost a match in regulation or overtime in a record 35 matches. The Pioneers had a season record of 20 wins, no losses and 3 draws heading into the College Cup. While the Pioneers played in the considerably weaker Summit League, the program had several major non-conference results including victories over the then-ranked Butler, Rutgers, New Mexico and Portland. Again, in the match, Wake Forest scored quickly into the game with Jon Bakero scoring in the seventh minute. The lead was short lived, as Denver's Andre Shinyashiki tied the match just 10 minutes later. The match would remain 1–1 until overtime. In the second period of overtime, Ian Harkes netted a goal in the bottom left corner off a counterattack to seal the Deacons' first NCAA championship appearance in nearly 10 years.

=== Stanford ===
The Stanford Cardinal entered the tournament as the defending national champions. During the regular season, the Cardinal amassed a conference record of eight wins, one draw and one loss. The record was good enough to have the best Pac-12 conference regular season, which doubled as the Pac-12 championship. Stanford secured their fourth Pac-12 title, and their third-consecutive conference championship with a 3–0 away victory at Oregon State on October 27.

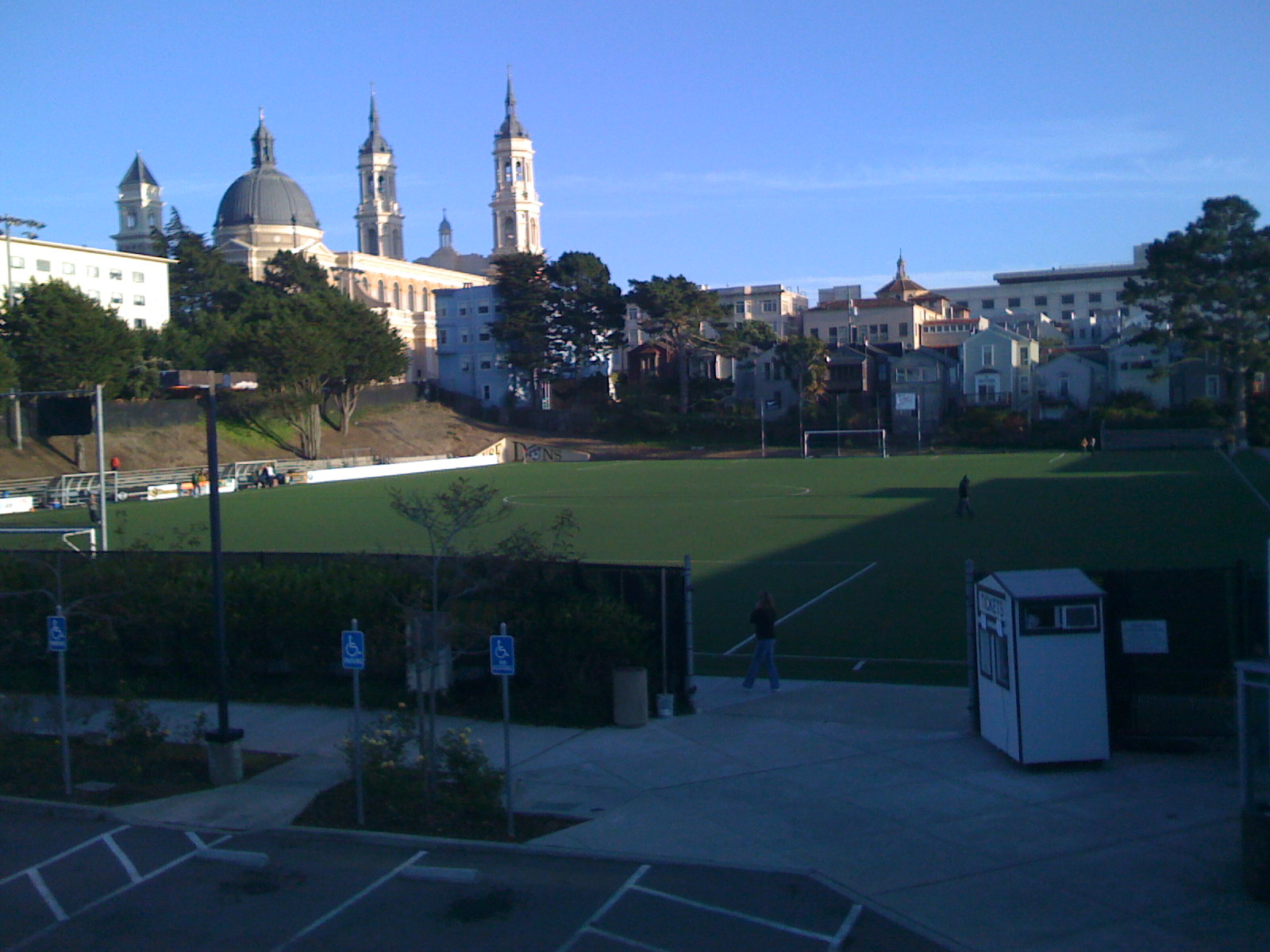
Stanford had a 2–1 away loss to San Francisco at Negoesco Stadium.

Entering the 2016 season, the Cardinal were ranked first in the nation in the NSCAA Poll. Ahead of the regular season, Stanford played two in-state colleges in exhibitions, picking up a 5–0 win at home against Sacramento State and a 2–1 win at Cal Poly. The regular season however, began slowly for Stanford, as the Cardinal failed to pick up a win in their first four matches. Stanford were forced to settle with two home draws against Penn State and Saint Mary's. Following their 0–0–2 start to the season, the Cardinal dropped from first to fifteenth in the polls. In their third and fourth games of the season, Stanford traveled out to Indiana to participate in the early season Adidas/IU Credit Union Classic tournament. There, the Cardinal had a loss to the fourth-ranked, Notre Dame and a draw against the seventh-ranked, Indiana.

Despite these results, Stanford remained ranked at number 25, and managed to go on a three-match win streak, which allowed the Cardinal to rise modestly to 23rd in the nation. In a road match against unranked San Francisco, the Cardinal had their second loss of the season, losing by a 1–2 scoreline against the Dons. The Cardinal became unranked for the first time since 2013 the following week. Entering Pac-12 play, the Cardinal went on a good run of form going undefeated for their next eight matches. The streak saw Stanford improve their overall record to 10–2–4, and their conference record to 7–0–1, causing them to ascend to number nine in the nation. The Cardinal would eventually have a loss at home to number 16, Washington, but would remain ranked in the top 10 as they finished off Pac-12 play.

Stanford earned an automatic berth in the NCAA Tournament by the virtue of winning the Pac-12 regular season, which doubled as the championship. Their Rating Percentage Index and the quality of their wins allowed the Cardinal to earn the fifth overall seed in the tournament, and thus earn a bye to the second round of the competition. In the second round, Stanford hosted nearby University of the Pacific. Goals from Foster Langsdorf and Tomas Hilliard-Arce secured a 2–0 victory for the Cardinal. Langsdorf would end up being the winning goalscorer in the Cardinal's third round matchup against the 12th-seeded, Virginia. A golden goal broke the scoreless stalemate, and gave Stanford 1–0 victory over the Cavaliers.

For the quarterfinals, the Cardinal took on their second ACC opponent of the tournament, and traveled to Kentucky to take on the Louisville Cardinals. Langsdorf would prove to be the hero again for Stanford, scoring in the 64th minute. Stanford midfielder, Sam Werner, would add an insurance goal in the 79th minute to give Stanford a 2–0 away win at Louisville and secure their spot in the College Cup. There, Stanford took on their third straight ACC opponent, North Carolina. The match, also played at BBVA Compass Stadium ended in a scoreless draw after regulation and two overtime periods. After a marathon of penalty kicks, Stanford prevailed when Alex Comsia missed his penalty kick in the 10th round of the shootout. It allowed Stanford to win the penalty shoot-out, 10–9 and advance to their second straight national championship.

== Pre-match ==
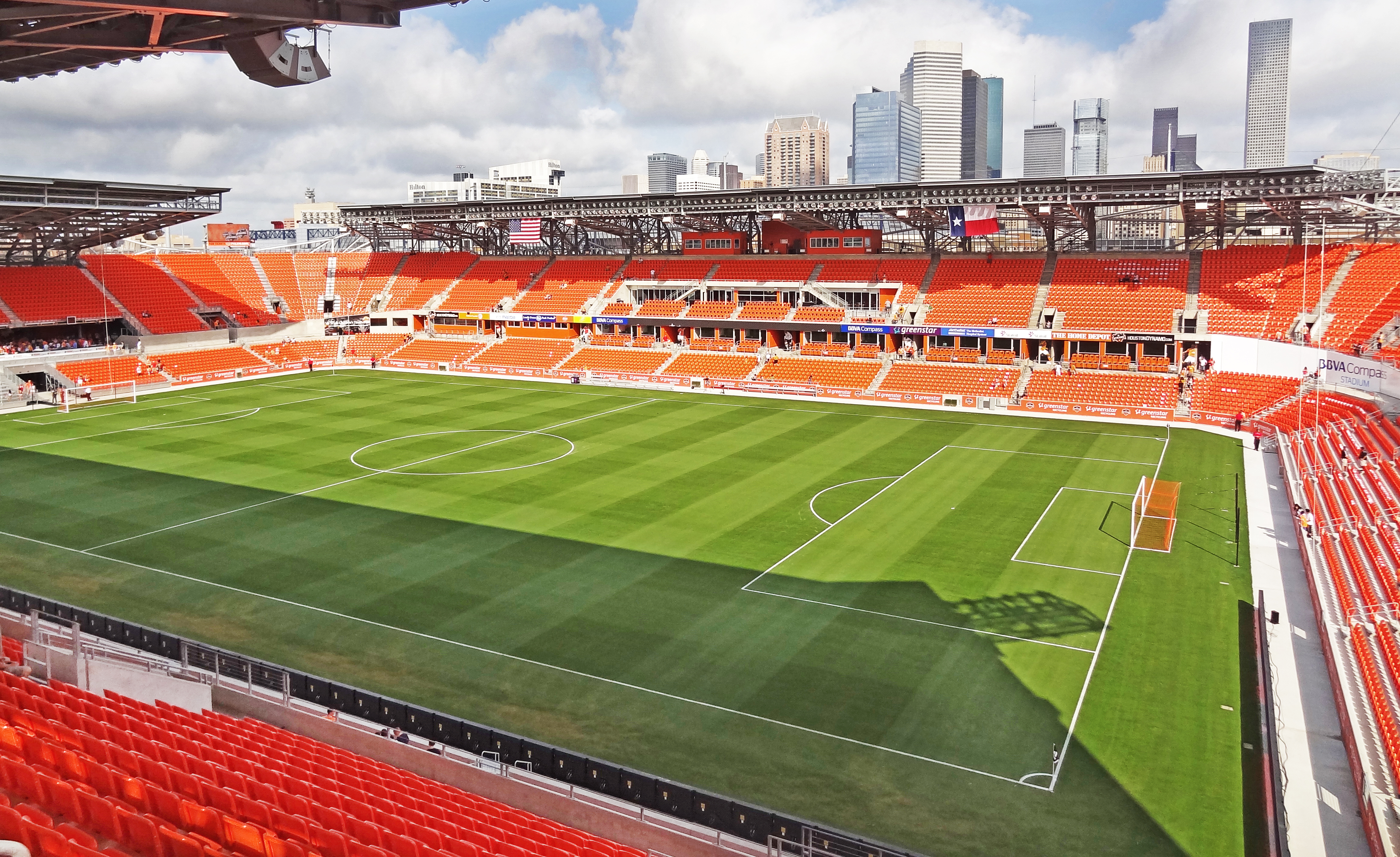
BBVA Compass Stadium in Houston hosted the 2016 Men's College Cup.

=== Venue selection ===
The National Collegiate Athletic Association determined the host of the final on December 13, 2013. The announcement of Houston's BBVA Compass Stadium being the College Cup host was in conjuncture with the announcement of the Houston region hosting the 2016 and 2017 NCAA Division III Women's Golf Championship and the 2018 NCAA Division II Women's Golf Championship. Since the foundation of the NCAA Tournament, the venue for the College Cup semifinals and national championship have been played at a predetermined neutral site. It was the first time since 2008 that the state of Texas hosted the NCAA Men's College Cup, and the third time ever that the state hosted the College Cup.

=== Analysis ===
The match was predicted to be a very close game, with the possibility of either side winning the game being nearly even. An NCAA.com fan poll saw that 55 percent of viewers felt that Wake Forest was going to win the match, while 45 percent felt that Stanford would win. CollegeSoccerNews.com described the match as a likely cagey contest featuring two very evenly matched teams. Brian Radewitz at Hero Sports predicted that the match would be tightly contested, but that Stanford would prevail. Radewitz felt that Stanford would have an edge over Wake Forest, given their experience in the tournament, as well as the team's sturdy defense.

== Match ==
Kickoff was scheduled for 1:00 pm local time. Mark Kadlecik was the referee and his assistants were Cameron Blanchard and Brian Dunn. The fourth official was John McCloskey. There were no suspensions or injuries of note. The weather was cloudy with occasional rain showers with a temperature of 71 °F (22 °C).

=== First half ===
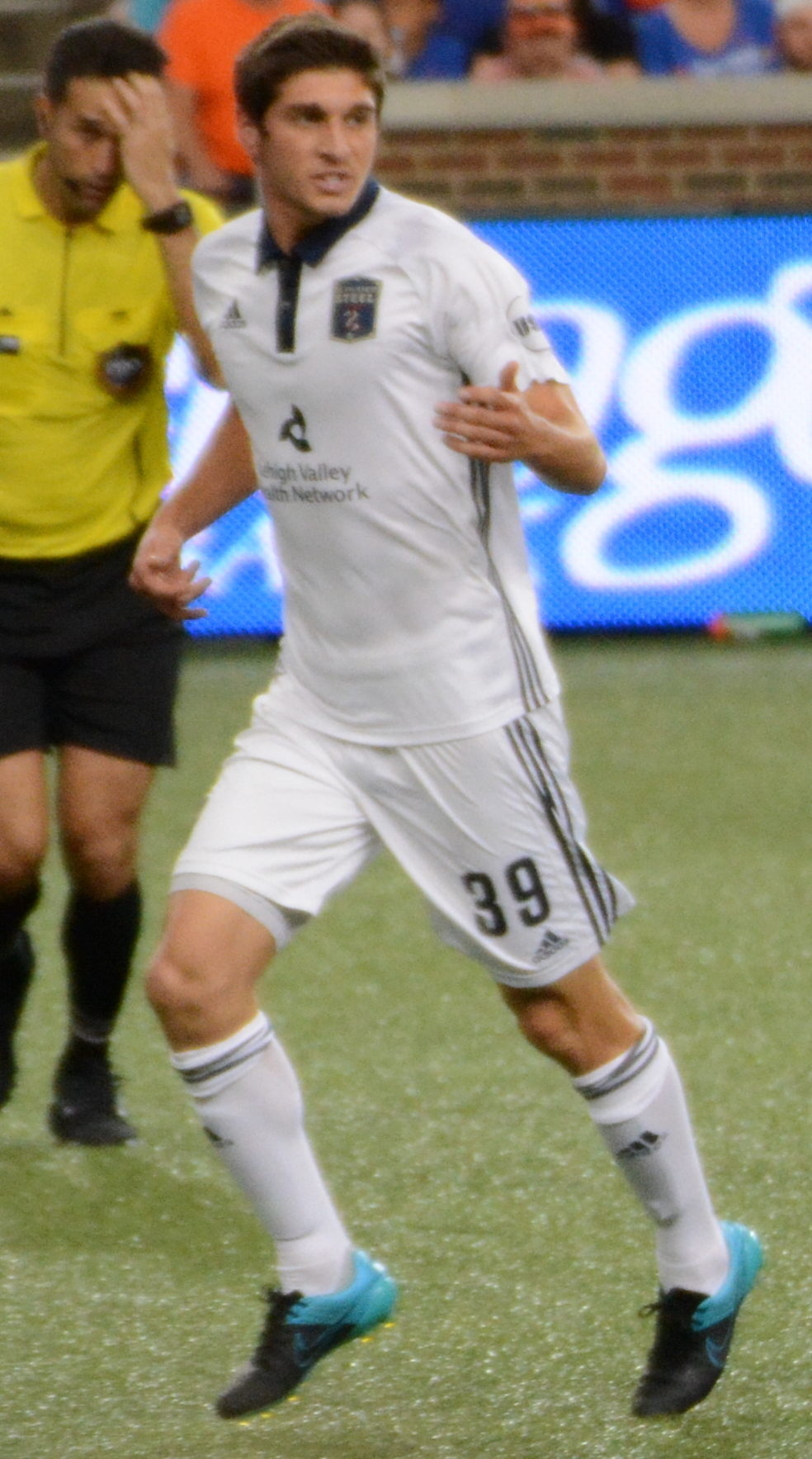
Drew Skundrich (pictured) was Stanford's co-captain for the match

Both teams were coming off a short, two-day turnaround from their semifinal victories. Due to the turnaround, Wake Forest Bobby Muuss, made two notable changes in the team's lineup from their 2–1 semifinal victory against Denver. Goalkeeper Andreu Mundet started in goal instead of Alec Ferrell, who played the entire match against Denver. Defender Hunter Bandy started for the match, despite not playing at all against Denver. Bandy started in the place of Alex Knox. The rest of Wake Forest's starting lineup featured the same individuals who started against Denver on December 9. Ema Twumasi, who was the program's top scorer in the tournament remained in the starting lineup as well as club captain, Ian Harkes. Stanford's head coach, Jeremy Gunn employed the same starting eleven in the match as he did from their semifinal victory against North Carolina.

The early portions of the match largely favored Stanford, who were able to dribble regularly down the right flank of Wake Forest's defense. Stanford threatened early in the third minute of play, with Corey Baird forcing Mundet to make an early save. Stanford kept up the pressure through the first 15 minutes, but failed to put anything on frame or stretch Mundet. Wake Forest's first opportunity came in the 20th minute, where Ian Harkes fed a through ball to Jacori Hayes. On a controversial no-call, Stanford right-back, Tanner Beason, slide tackled Hayes inside the box to stop his shot on goal. Instant replays suggested that it was a clean tackle. Three minutes later, Wake Forest began to add more pressure on Stanford. Off a Wake Forest corner, striker Jon Bakero had a bicycle kick shot on goal that went straight to Andrew Epstein.

Midway through the first half, both teams elected to make substitutions. Regular rotation players Steven Echevarria and Hayden Partain came on for Wake Forest for Luis Argudo and Ema Twumasi, respectively. For the Cardinal, rotation players Sam Werner and Adrian Alabi were subbed on for Bryce Marion and Corey Baird, respectively. In the 43rd minute, Wake Forest had their second shot on frame, where Deacons captain, Harkes, struck a shot on frame from about 20 yards out. The shot forced Epstein to make a diving save, that caused a deflection in the box before Tomas Hilliard-Arce could clear it out of the box. A moment later, Stanford made one more first half substitution, where Adrian Alabi came on for Foster Langsdorf, who had a rather quiet first half. The match ended scoreless going into the break.

=== Second half ===
The initial starting lineups employed in the first half were retained in the second half. At halftime Stanford made three substitutions, while Wake Forest made two. Stanford's Bryce Marion, Corey Baird and Foster Langsdorf returned for the second half of play after being subbed off in the first half. The three came on for Sam Werner, Amir Bashti and Adrian Albai, respectively. For Wake Forest, Ema Twumasi and Luis Argudo returned, being subbed on for Hayden Partain and Steven Echevarria, respectively.

In the second half, the match got more chippy between the two sides, where the first caution of the match was issued. In the 48th minute, Wake Forest's Luis Argudo received a yellow card for a late tackle on Stanford's Jared Gilbey. In a cautious move, Muuss subbed off Argudo and brought Partain back into the match in the 56th minute. In the 58th minute, play was stopped due to an apparent injury to Deacons defender, Brad Dunwell after colliding with Corey Baird on a cross. Dunwell was treated by team doctors, but returned to the game. As the second half continued, the game became more of a midfield battle as both sides failed to generate shots on goal.

In the 69th minute of play, Wake Forest had arguably their best chance of the match, where Kevin Politz's header sailed just over the bar, despite beating Esptein. In the 72nd minute, Stanford has a shot that almost crossed the line, that required the officials to look back on instant replay to see if the ball had crossed the line. The officials determined that Wake Forest goalie, Andreu Cases Mundet prevented the ball from crossing the line, causing the game to remain scoreless. Stanford had another opportunity in the 78th minute where Alabi had a header off a Harkes cross, but the header was punched away by Mundet.

With three minutes remaining in regulation, Corey Baird was given a yellow card for his challenge on Mundet during a cross where both him and Mundet went for the in-swinger. The final few minutes of the game remained defensive as both teams prepared for overtime. The match ended scoreless after 90 minutes.

=== Extra time and penalties ===
After 90 minutes of scoreless soccer, two sudden death periods of 10 minutes were played. Unlike FIFA's Laws of the Game, the NCAA employs a shorter, 10-minute overtime period and institutes the golden goal. The first period of extra time began with Stanford possession, and proved to be a defensive affair between both teams. Both teams failed to generate any shots on frame in the first seven minutes of overtime, before Wake Forest had a threatening look on goal. Argudo fed a corner kick to Kevin Politz, whose head was blocked by Epstein. The rebound shot by Brad Dunwell was also blocked by the Stanford back four before being cleared. Prior to the break between the two overtime periods, Muuss and Gunn elected to sub on attack-minded players.

The best chance of the second period of extra time came in the 104th minute, when Harkes was able to connect with Politz on an additional corner; however, Politz's header went wide. Both teams made penalty kick-conscience substitutions in the 107th minute to prepare for the potential penalty shootout. The final few minutes of extra time failed to create any shots. At the end of 110 minutes of soccer, the score was still level at zero.

Decided by a coin flip, Stanford was first to shoot in the penalty shoot-out. Both Stanford and Wake Forest scored in the first three rounds of the shoot-out. In the fourth round, Stanford defender, Tomas Hilliard-Arce missed his penalty kick, while Wake Forest striker, Jon Bakero, scored his penalty kick. This required Stanford's Baird to score his penalty kick to prevent losing in the shootout. Baird converted his penalty kick, which required Wake Forest's Hayden Partain to score to give Wake Forest the national title. Partain's elected to aim his penalty to the bottom left corner, but the kick was well-saved by Epstein, thus leaving the score tied at four after five rounds, requiring sudden death penalties. Stanford midfielder, Sam Werner converted his penalty, but Wake Forest's Brian Dunwell had his shot saved by Epstein, thus ending the penalty shootout, and ending the match.

=== Details ===
December 11, 2016
2:00 PM EST

Wake Forest	0–0 (a.e.t.)	Stanford
	Report
Penalties
Harkes (penalty scored); Hayes (penalty scored); Bruno Lapa (penalty scored); Bakero (penalty scored); Partain (penalty missed); Dunwell (penalty missed)	4–5	(penalty scored) Beason; (penalty scored) Langsdorf; (penalty scored) Mosharrafa; (penalty missed) Hilliard-Arce; (penalty scored) Baird; (penalty scored) Werner

BBVA Compass Stadium, Houston
Attendance: 6,315
Referee: Mark Kadlecik

Wake Forest	Stanford

GK	1	(Spain) Andreu Mundet
RB	20	(United States) Hunter Bandy
CB	17	(United States) Logan Gdula
CB	4	(United States) Kevin Politz
LB	26	(United States) Sam Raben
RM	12	(United States) Brad Dunwell
CM	16	(United States) Ian Harkes (c)
CM	8	(United States) Jacori Hayes		(substituted off) 77' (substituted on) 81' (substituted off) 100' (substituted on) 103'
CM	22	(Ghana) Ema Twumasi		(substituted off) 36' (substituted on) 46' (substituted off) 101' (substituted on) 103'
LM	2	(United States) Luis Argudo	(yellow card) 48'	(substituted off) 30' (substituted on) 46' (substituted off) 56' (substituted on) 91' (substituted off) 103'
ST	7	(Spain) Jon Bakero
Substitutes:
MF	10	(Brazil) Bruno Lapa
MF	25	(United States) Ricky Greensfelder		(substituted on) 103'
MF	15	(United States) Steven Echevarria		(substituted on) 30' (substituted off) 46' (substituted on) 77' (substituted off) 91' (substituted on) 100' (substituted off) 103'
MF	21	(United States) Hayden Partain		(substituted on) 36' (substituted off) 46' (substituted on) 56' (substituted off) 81' (substituted on) 101' (substituted off) 103'
GK	30	(United States) Grant Bishop
DF	3	(El Salvador) Rafael Fagundo
FW	9	(United States) Tater Rennhack
Manager:
(United States) Bobby Muuss

GK	1	(United States) Andrew Epstein
RB	3	(United States) Tanner Beason
CB	4	(United States) Tomas Hilliard-Arce (c)
CB	16	(Egypt) Adam Mosharrafa
LB	8	(United States) Brian Nana-Sinkam
RM	15	(United States) Jared Gilbey		(substituted off) 63' (substituted on) 69' (substituted off) 107'
CM	7	(United States) Bryce Marion		(substituted off) 28' (substituted on) 46' (substituted off) 77' (substituted on) 81' (substituted off) 95' (substituted on) 101' (substituted off) 110'
CM	12	(United States) Drew Skundrich
LF	29	(United States) Derek Waldeck	(yellow card) 96'	(substituted off) 69' (substituted on) 77'
CF	2	(United States) Foster Langsdorf		(substituted off) 42' (substituted on) 46' (substituted off) 76' (substituted on) 81' (substituted off) 100' (substituted on) 105'
CF	10	(United States) Corey Baird	(yellow card) 87'	(substituted off) 31' (substituted on) 46' (substituted off) 68' (substituted on) 76' (substituted off) 100' (substituted on) 110'
Substitutes:
GK	30	(Belgium) Nico Corti
DF	22	(United States) Quentin Chi
DF	21	(United States) Collin Liberty
DF	23	(United States) Sam Werner		(substituted on) 28' (substituted off) 46' (substituted on) 63' (substituted off) 81' (substituted on) 95' (substituted off) 101' (substituted on) 107'
MF	17	(United States) Adrian Alabi		(substituted on) 42' (substituted off) 46' (substituted on) 68' (substituted off) 81' (substituted on) 100' (substituted off) 105'
MF	11	(United States) Amir Bashti		(substituted on) 31' (substituted off) 46' (substituted on) 100'
FW	14	(United States) Justin Kahl
Manager:
(England) Jeremy Gunn

College Cup MVP
Andrew Epstein (Stanford)

Assistant referees:
Cameron Blanchard (United States)
Brian Dunn (United States)
Fourth official:
John McCloskey (United States)

Match rules:

- 90 minutes.
- 20 minutes of extra time if necessary.
- Penalty shoot-out if scores still level.
- Unlimited substitutes, may not return if subbed out in the first half; may return unlimited times in the second half.

=== Statistics ===
Overall
	Wake Forest	Stanford
Goals scored	0	0
Total shots	10	9
Shots on target	4	5
Saves	5	4
Corner kicks	5	4
Fouls committed	17	23
Offsides	0	0
Yellow cards	1	2
Red cards	0	0

== Post-match ==
The Stanford Cardinal became the first men's college soccer program to successfully defend the men's soccer national championship since Indiana did so in 2003–2004. Andrew Epstein was named the College Cup MVP and the Defensive Player of the Tournament. Wake Forest's Ian Harkes was named the Offensive Player of the Tournament. A month later, Wake Forest captain, Ian Harkes went on to win the Hermann Trophy, an annual award given to the best college soccer player in the nation. Harkes would subsequently go on trial with EFL Championship side, Derby County before eventually signing a homegrown contract with Major League Soccer's D.C. United.
