= 2016 Stanford Cardinal men's soccer team =

American college soccer season

2016 Stanford Cardinal men's soccer

National Champions

Pac-12 Champions

NCAA Tournament, College Cup vs. North Carolina
- Conference: Pac-12 Conference
- Record: 14–3–4 (8–1–1 Pac-12)
- Head coach: Jeremy Gunn (5th season)
- Assistant coaches: Nick Kirchhof (5th season); Oige Kennedy (1st season); Charles Rodriguez (1st season)
- Home stadium: Laird Q. Cagan Stadium

2016 Pac-12 Conference men's soccer standings
	Conf.					Overall
Team	W		L		T	W		L		T
No. 1 Stanford ‡	8	–	1	–	1	14	–	3	–	6
No. 12 Washington +	6	–	4	–	0	14	–	7	–	0
San Diego State +	4	–	3	–	3	9	–	4	–	6
UCLA +	4	–	5	–	1	10	–	8	–	2
Oregon State	3	–	5	–	2	7	–	8	–	3
California	1	–	8	–	1	5	–	10	–	2
‡-Conference champion + - Invited to the 2016 NCAA Division I Men's Soccer Championship; As of 13 December 2016; Rankings from NSCAA

The 2016 Stanford Cardinal men's soccer team represented Stanford University during the 2016 NCAA Division I men's soccer season. It was the 43rd season of the university fielding a program.

The Cardinal entered the season as the defending national champions. The Cardinal successfully defended their title in the 2016 NCAA Tournament against the Wake Forest Demon Deacons.

== Roster ==
As of December 5, 2016

Note: Flags indicate national team as defined under FIFA eligibility rules; some limited exceptions apply. Players may hold more than one non-FIFA nationality.

No.	Pos.	Nation	Player
1	GK	(United States) USA	Andrew Epstein
2	FW	(United States) USA	Foster Langsdorf
3	DF	(United States) USA	Tanner Beason
4	MF	(United States) USA	Tomas Hilliard-Arce
5	MF	(United States) USA	Colin Hyatt
6	MF	(United States) USA	Trevor Hyman
7	MF	(United States) USA	Bryce Marion
8	DF	(United States) USA	Brian Nana-Sinkam
10	MF	(United States) USA	Corey Baird
11	DF	(United States) USA	Amir Bashti
12	MF	(United States) USA	Drew Skundrich
14	MF	(United States) USA	Justin Kahl

No.	Pos.	Nation	Player
15	MF	(United States) USA	Jared Gilbey
16	DF	(United States) USA	Adam Mosharrafa
17	FW	(United States) USA	Adrian Alabi
18	MF	(United States) USA	Mark Joshua
19	MF	(United States) USA	Kyle Casey
20	GK	(United States) USA	Charlie Furrer
21	DF	(United States) USA	Collin Liberty
22	MF	(United States) USA	Quentin Chi
23	MF	(United States) USA	Sam Werner
27	MF	(Colombia) COL	Emanuel Pinilla
29	FW	(United States) USA	Derek Waldeck
30	GK	(Belgium) BEL	Nico Corti

== Coaching staff ==
Position	Person
Head coach	Jeremy Gunn
Assistant coach	Nick Kirchhof
Assistant coach	Oige Kennedy
Volunteer coach	Charles Rodriguez

Last updated: December 5, 2016
Source: Stanford Athletics

== Schedule ==
Date Time, TV	Rank^{#}	Opponent^{#}	Result	Record	Site (Attendance) City, State
Preseason
8/13/16*; 7:05 pm	No. 1	Sacramento State	W 5–0		Cagan Stadium (Not reported); Stanford, California
8/17/16*; 7:00 pm	No. 1	at Cal Poly	W 2–1		Spanos Stadium (415); San Luis Obispo, California
Non-conference regular season
8/26/16*; 5:00 pm, P12N	No. 1	Penn State	T 0–0 ^{2OT}	0–0–1	Cagan Stadium (777); Stanford, California
8/28/16*; 5:05 pm, P12N	No. 1	Saint Mary's	T 2–2 ^{2OT}	0–0–2	Cagan Stadium (596); Stanford, California
9/02/16*; 2:30 pm	No. 15	vs. No. 4 Notre Dame; Adidas/IU Credit Union Classic	L 1–2 ^{2OT}	0–1–2	Bill Armstrong Stadium (4,007); Bloomington, Indiana
9/04/16*; 4:30 pm, BTN	No. 15	at No. 5 Indiana; Adidas/IU Credit Union Classic	T 0–0 ^{2OT}	0–1–3	Bill Armstrong Stadium (4,081); Bloomington, Indiana
9/10/16*; 7:00 pm, P12N	No. 24	San Jose State	W 4–1	1–1–3	Cagan Stadium (914); Stanford, California
9/16/16*; 8:00 pm, P12N	No. 25	Harvard	W 3–1	2–1–3	Cagan Stadium (2,103); Stanford, California
9/18/16*; 8:00 pm, GSTV	No. 25	Omaha	W 4–0	3–1–3	Cagan Stadium (542); Stanford, California
9/23/16*; 7:00 pm	No. 23	at San Francisco	L 1–2	3–2–3	Negoesco Stadium (542); San Francisco
Pac-12 Conference regular season
10/02/16; 7:00 pm, P12N		California; Rivalry	W 1–0	4–2–3 (1–0–0)	Cagan Stadium (1,374); Stanford, California
10/06/16; 7:00 pm, P12N		at No. 16 Washington	W 1–0	5–2–3 (2–0–0)	Husky Soccer Stadium (1,198); Seattle
10/09/16; 11:00 am, P12N		at Oregon State	W 1–0 ^{2OT}	6–2–3 (3–0–0)	Lorenz Field (424); Corvallis, Oregon
10/13/16; 7:00 pm, P12N	No. 16	No. 25 San Diego State	W 3–1	7–2–3 (4–0–0)	Cagan Stadium (624); Stanford, California
10/16/16; 5:00 pm, P12N	No. 16	No. 17 UCLA	W 3–0	8–2–3 (5–0–0)	Cagan Stadium (1,262); Stanford, California
10/20/16; 7:00 pm	No. 12	at San Diego State	T 1–1 ^{2OT}	8–2–4 (5–0–1)	SDSU Sports Deck (579); San Diego
10/23/16; 5:00 pm, P12N	No. 12	at No. 24 UCLA	W 3–2	9–2–4 (6–0–1)	Drake Stadium (3,115); Los Angeles
10/27/16; 5:00 pm, P12N	No. 9	at Oregon State	W 3–0	10–2–4 (7–0–1)	Cagan Stadium (1,154); Stanford, California
10/30/16; 5:00 pm, P12N	No. 9	No. 16 Washington	L 0–1 ^{OT}	10–3–4 (7–1–1)	Cagan Stadium (1,171); Stanford, California
11/11/16; 1:00 pm, P12N	No. 8	California	W 2–1 ^{OT}	11–3–4 (8–1–1)	Cagan Stadium (1,680); Stanford, California
NCAA Tournament
12/20/16*; 5:00 pm	No. 5 (5)	Pacific; Second Round	W 2–0	12–3–4	Cagan Stadium (1,403); Stanford, California
12/27/16*; 5:00 pm	No. 5 (5)	No. 16 (12) Virginia; Third Round	W 1–0 ^{2OT}	13–3–4	Cagan Stadium (1,185); Stanford, California
12/09/16*; 5:45 pm, ESPN3	No. 5 (5)	at No. 4 (7) Louisville; Quarterfinals	W 2–0	14–3–4	Lynn Stadium (3,247); Louisville, Kentucky
12/09/16*; 5:45 pm, ESPNU	No. 5 (5)	vs. No. 8 (9) North Carolina; College Cup – Semifinals	T 0–0 ^{2OT} (W 10–9 pk)	14–3–5	BBVA Compass Stadium (6,056); Houston
12/11/16*; 2:00 pm, ESPNU	No. 5 (5)	vs. No. 2 (2) Wake Forest; College Cup – Final	T 0–0^{2OT} W 4–5 pen.	14–3–6	BBVA Compass Stadium (6,315); Houston
*Non-conference game. ^{#}Rankings from United Soccer Coaches. (#) Tournament seedings in parentheses.
