= Pac-12 Conference Player of the Year =

Pac-12 Conference Player of the Year may refer to:

- Pac-12 Conference Men's Basketball Player of the Year
- Pac-12 Conference Women's Basketball Player of the Year
- Pac-12 Conference Baseball Player of the Year
- Pac-12 Conference Men's Soccer Player of the Year
- Pac-12 Conference Softball Player of the Year
- Pac-12 Conference Offensive Player of the Year, one of the annual Pac-12 Conference football individual awards
- Pac-12 Conference Defensive Player of the Year, one of the annual Pac-12 Conference football individual awards
