= Pac-12 Conference Men's Soccer Player of the Year =

Annual American soccer award

The Pac-12 Conference Men's Soccer Player of the Year is a currently dormant annual award given to the top performing player in the Pac-12 Conference. After the conference's 2024 collapse, it suspended men's soccer competition. Pac-12 men's soccer will resume in 2026, with legacy full member Oregon State, plus incoming full members Gonzaga and San Diego State, joined by four new affiliates from the Big West Conference.

In 2014, the Pac-12 Conference introduced a new award solely for defensive players.

== Key ==
†	Co-Players of the Year

== Winners ==
=== Player of the Year (2000–2023) ===
Season	Player	School	Position	Class	Reference
2000	Ryan Nelsen	Stanford	Defender	Senior	
2001	Roger Levesque	Stanford	Midfielder	Junior	
2002	Josh Saunders	California	Goalkeeper	Senior	
2003	Matt Taylor	UCLA	Forward	Senior	
2004	Patrick Ianni; C. J. Klaas	UCLA; Washington	Defender; Defender	Junior; Senior	
2005	Calen Carr	California	Forward	Senior	
2006	Kevin Forrest	Washington	Forward	Junior	
2007	Ely Allen; Andrew Jacobson	Washington; California	Midfielder; Midfielder	Senior; Senior	
2008	Michael Stephens	UCLA	Midfielder	Junior	
2009	Danny Mwanga	Oregon State	Forward	Senior	
2010	A. J. Soares	California	Defender	Senior	
2011	Kelyn Rowe	UCLA	Midfielder	Senior	
2012	Ryan Hollingshead	UCLA	Midfielder	Senior	
2013	Leo Stolz	UCLA	Midfielder	Junior	
2014	Khiry Shelton	Oregon State	Forward	Senior	
2015	Jordan Morris	Stanford	Forward	Junior	
2016	José Hernández; Foster Langsdorf	UCLA; Stanford	Midfielder; Forward	Sophomore; Junior	
2017	Foster Langsdorf	Stanford	Forward	Senior	
2018	Tanner Beason	Stanford	Defender	Junior	
2019	Blake Bodily	Washington	Midfielder	Junior	
2020	Zach Ryan	Stanford	Midfielder	Junior	
2021	Sofiane Djeffal	Oregon State	Midfielder	Senior	
2022	Joran Gerbet	Oregon State	Midfielder	Sophomore	
2023	Logan Farrington	Oregon State	Forward	Senior	

=== Defensive Player of the Year (2014–2023, 2026–present) ===
Season	Player	School	Class	Reference
2014	Brandon Vincent	Stanford	Junior	
2015	Brandon Vincent	Stanford	Senior	
2016	Tomas Hilliard-Arce	Stanford	Junior	
2017	Tomas Hilliard-Arce	Stanford	Senior	
2018	Tanner Beason	Stanford	Junior	
2019	Ethan Bartlow	Washington	Junior	
2020	Charlie Ostrem	Washington	Junior	
2021	Ryan Sailor	Washington	Senior	
2022	Keegan Hughes	Stanford	Senior	
2023	Wyatt Meyer	California	Junior	
2026	William Lawson	Cal Baptist	Junior	

=== Offensive Player of the Year (2021–2023, 2026–present) ===
Season	Player	School	Class	Reference
2021	Tyrone Mondi	Oregon State	Senior	
2022	Ilijah Paul	Washington	Junior	
2023	Logan Farrington	Oregon State	Senior	
2026	Wyatt Borso	Oregon State	Senior	

=== Midfielder of the Year (2026–present) ===
Season	Player	School	Class	Reference
2026	Stavros Charalampous	Cal Baptist	Senior	
2026	Oliver Hernandez Parra	Oregon State	Sophomore	
