= Justin Schmidt =

Justin Schmidt may refer to:

- Justin O. Schmidt (1947–2023), American entomologist
- Justin Schmidt (soccer) (born 1993), American soccer player

== See also ==
- Justin Schmitt (born 1974), Australian rules football field umpire
