= Andrew Epstein =

American former college soccer player

Mac Steeves
Personal information
- Date of birth: January 14, 1996 (age 30)
- Place of birth: Fort Collins, Colorado, U.S.
- Height: 6 ft 0 in (1.83 m)
- Position: Goalkeeper

Youth career
- –2013: Colorado Rapids

College career
| Years | Team | Apps | (Gls) |
| 2013–2016 | Stanford Cardinal | 65 | (0) |

Senior career*
| Years | Team | Apps | (Gls) |
| 2016 | San Francisco City | 4 | (0) |
- * Club domestic league appearances and goals

Andrew Epstein (born January 14, 1996) is an American former college soccer player who last played for Stanford University. Epstein won the 2016 NCAA Division I Men's Soccer Tournament Most Outstanding Player Defensive MVP Award when the program won the 2016 NCAA Division I Men's Soccer Championship Game. He majored in Electrical Engineering, and was known for his strong efforts on group projects.

== Career ==
=== Youth and college ===
Epstein played for the Colorado Rapids youth academy prior to his collegiate career. Epstein played four years of college soccer for Stanford University. He was the program's starter for his sophomore through senior years, in which they won the 2015 and 2016 national titles. He finished with 65 appearances for Stanford.

During his senior year he earned several regional and national accolades, including being named to the Pac-12 first team.

=== Senior ===
Epstein spent the 2016 PDL season playing with San Francisco City. He made four appearances with the team.

== Personal life ==
After retiring from the game, Epstein served in the Peace Corps. He was assigned to a two year mission in the rural locality of Sinendé, Benin, which he began in September 2017.

Epstein was known for his strong work in Electrical Engineering, especially on group projects in the grueling Green Electronics class taught by Bill Dally, even though it coincided with the 2016 NCAA Division I Men's Soccer Championship Game. After retiring from the peace corps, he became a professional electrical engineer.

== Honors ==
- NCAA College Cup Defensive MVP: 2016
- NSCAA Scholar First Team All-American: 2016
- NSCAA Second Team All-American: 2016
- CoSIDA First Team Academic All-American: 2016
- TopDrawerSoccer.com Best XI: 2016
- Pac-12 Best XI: 2016
- Pac-12 Second Team: 2014, 2015
