= Josh Morton =

American soccer player

Personal information
- Full name: Joshua Morton
- Date of birth: April 3, 1996 (age 30)
- Place of birth: Wyandotte, Michigan, United States
- Height: 6 ft 2 in (1.88 m)
- Positions: Defender; midfielder

Youth career
- 2012–2014: San Jose Earthquakes

College career
Years	Team	Apps	(Gls)
2014–2017	California Golden Bears	65	(2)

Senior career*
Years	Team	Apps	(Gls)
2015–2017	Burlingame Dragons	23	(0)
2018	Tulsa Roughnecks	32	(1)
2019	Memphis 901	18	(1)
- * Club domestic league appearances and goals as of October 23, 2019

Joshua Morton (born April 3, 1996) is an American soccer player.

== Career ==
=== College and amateur ===
Morton played four years of college soccer at the University of California, Berkeley between 2014 and 2017. While at college, he appeared for Premier Development League side Burlingame Dragons.

=== Professional ===
On January 21, 2018, Morton was drafted 84th overall in the 2018 MLS SuperDraft by Chicago Fire.

On March 19, 2018, he signed with Chicago's United Soccer League affiliate club Tulsa Roughnecks.

=== Personal ===
Morton graduated from the University of California, Berkeley, with a degree in multi/interdisciplinary studies in 2018 and worked in HRIS sales as an account executive for failing Houston-based startup, Goco.io. He is now with SmartVault.
