= Tomas Hilliard-Arce =

American soccer player (born 1995)

Personal information
- Full name: Tomas Andres Hilliard-Arce
- Date of birth: November 22, 1995 (age 30)
- Place of birth: Hartford, Connecticut, United States
- Height: 6 ft 1 in (1.85 m)
- Position: Defender

Youth career
- 2010–2014: Charlotte Soccer Academy

College career
Years	Team	Apps	(Gls)
2014–2017	Stanford Cardinal	87	(13)

Senior career*
Years	Team	Apps	(Gls)
2015	Charlotte Eagles		
2017	Burlingame Dragons		
2018–2019	LA Galaxy	5	(0)
2018–2019	LA Galaxy II	39	(4)
2020	Sacramento Republic	12	(1)
- * Club domestic league appearances and goals as of October 4, 2020

Tomas Andres Hilliard-Arce (born November 22, 1995) is an American former soccer player.

== Career ==
=== Youth and college ===
Hilliard-Arce was born in Stamford, Connecticut, but grew up in the Charlotte suburb of Matthews, North Carolina. In high school, he played club soccer for Charlotte Soccer Academy in the U.S. Soccer Development Academy. During his freshman and sophomore years, Hilliard-Arce played high school soccer with Providence Day School. While playing for the Providence Day Chargers, Hilliard-Arce earned all-state honors as a sophomore and all-conference honors as a sophomore and freshman. During his junior and senior years, U.S. Soccer Laws changed prohibiting him from playing club and high school soccer.

Ahead of the 2014 NCAA Division I men's soccer season, Hilliard-Arce signed a National Letter of Intent to play for the Stanford Cardinal men's soccer program. Hilliard-Arce made his Stanford debut on August 29, 2014, where he started and played all 90 minutes in a 0–2 loss at Creighton. On September 9, 2014, he scored his first college soccer goal for the Cardinal, in a 4–1 win over UC Santa Barbara. Hilliard-Arce finished his freshman season with two goals in 19 appearances. Following his freshman year, he earned freshmen best XI honors from TopDrawer Soccer, Soccer America and CollegeSoccerNews.com, as well as second-team All-Pac-12. Hilliard-Arce remained a starter his sophomore year, during the program's first-ever national championship run. At the end of the season, Hilliard-Arce earned all-Pac-12 second-team honors as well as national second-team honors from TopDrawer Soccer.

Hilliard-Arce had a career year his junior year, where he helped the Cardinal repeat as national champions. His contributions, helped the program reach a record low 0.56 goals against average, one of the lowest in college soccer during the 2016 NCAA Division I men's soccer season. He earned first-team All-American honors from NSCAA and TopDrawer Soccer, as well as NSCAA College Cup Best XI, and was a semifinalist for the Hermann Trophy. At the end of the 2016 Pac-12 Conference men's soccer season, he was named the Pac-12 Defensive Player of the Year.

Speculation rose that Hilliard-Arce would go pro and forgo his senior year, but he returned for the 2017 season. There, he helped Stanford become the first program to three-peat as NCAA champions for the first time in over 20 years. Hilliard-Arce was named one of three finalists for the Hermann Trophy, but ultimately lost on voting to Jon Bakero of Wake Forest. Additionally, during his senior year, Hilliard-Arce repeated as the Pac-12 Defensive Player of the Year, and was, again named, an All-American by various soccer media outlets.

=== Professional ===
On January 19, 2018, Hilliard-Arce was selected 2nd overall in the 2018 MLS SuperDraft by LA Galaxy. Hillard-Arce made his debut for the Galaxy on May 21, 2018, against the Montreal Impact. He was subbed on in the 91st minute.

Following his release from LA Galaxy at the end of their 2019 season, Hilliard-Arce joined USL side Sacramento Republic on January 8, 2020.

On October 27, 2020, following the USL Championship season, Hilliard-Arce announced his retirement from playing professional soccer.

== International career ==
American-born Hilliard-Arce is also eligible to play for Costa Rica through his mother. He trained with the Costa Rican U20 team in 2014.

== Honors ==
=== Individual ===
- Pac-12 Defensive Player of the Year (2): 2016, 2017
- TopDrawer National Player of the Year: 2017

=== Team ===
- Stanford Cardinal
  - NCAA Division I Men's Soccer Championship (3): 2015, 2016, 2017
