= Foster Langsdorf =

American soccer player

Personal information
- Full name: Foster Langsdorf
- Date of birth: December 14, 1995 (age 30)
- Place of birth: Portland, Oregon, United States
- Height: 5 ft 10 in (1.78 m)
- Position: Forward

Youth career
- 2010–2011: Mountain View Thunder
- 2011–2012: FC Portland Academy
- 2012–2014: Portland Timbers

College career
Years	Team	Apps	(Gls)
2014–2017	Stanford Cardinal	82	(37)

Senior career*
Years	Team	Apps	(Gls)
2014–2016	Portland Timbers U23s	17	(3)
2017	San Francisco City	3	(1)
2018–2019	Portland Timbers	2	(0)
2018–2019	Portland Timbers 2	56	(21)
2020	Reno 1868	16	(10)
2020–2021	Minnesota United	2	(0)
2021	→ Tampa Bay Rowdies (loan)	3	(1)
- * Club domestic league appearances and goals as of 28 July 2021

Foster Langsdorf (born December 14, 1995) is an American former professional soccer player. After a very successful collegiate career at Stanford, he played for several teams over the course of five seasons. Most of is appearances were for Portland Timbers 2; he made a total of four appearances for Portland Timbers and Minnesota United of Major League Soccer. Langsdorf would announce his retirement in 2021.

== Career ==
=== Youth and college ===
Langsdorf played four years of college soccer for Stanford, winning three NCAA Division I Men's Soccer Championships in the process. While at college, Langsdorf also appeared for USL Premier Development League sides Portland Timbers U23s and San Francisco City FC.

=== Professional ===
A product of the Portland Timbers Academy, Langsdorf signed a homegrown contract with the Portland Timbers on January 19, 2018.

Langsdorf made his Timbers debut against the San Jose Earthquakes in a fourth-round Open Cup match on June 6, 2018.

Following his release by Portland at the end of their 2019 season, Langsdorf moved to USL Championship side Reno 1868 on January 24, 2020.

On October 30, 2020, following the 2020 USL Championship season, Langsforf signed a deal with Major League Soccer side Minnesota United ahead of their upcoming playoff fixtures.

Following a string of injuries to their attacking options, Langsdorf joined the Tampa Bay Rowdies on loan on 2 June 2021 and debuted that same day as a substitute during Tampa Bay's 1–0 win at New York Red Bulls II.

On July 27, 2021, Langsdorf announced his retirement.

== Career statistics ==
=== Club ===
As of match played 9 November 2020

Appearances and goals by club, season and competition
Club	Season	League			National Cup		Other		Total	
Club	Season	Division	Apps	Goals	Apps	Goals	Apps	Goals	Apps	Goals
Portland Timbers U23s	2014 to 2016	USL PDL	17	3	—		—		17	3
San Francisco City	2017	USL PDL	3	1	—		—		3	1
Portland Timbers	2018	MLS	0	0	1	0	0	0	1	0
Portland Timbers	2019	MLS	2	0	0	0	0	0	2	0
Portland Timbers	Total		2	0	1	0	0	0	3	0
Portland Timbers 2	2018	USL	29	14	—		1 (Note: Appearance(s) in USL Championship Playoffs)	0	30	14
Portland Timbers 2	2019	USLC	27	7	—		—		27	7
Portland Timbers 2	Total		56	21	0	0	1	0	57	21
Reno 1868	2020	USLC	16	10	—		2	1	18	11
Minnesota United	2020	MLS	1	0	—		0	0	1	0
Minnesota United	2021	MLS	1	0	0	0	0	0	1	0
Career total			96	35	1	0	3	1	100	36

== Honors ==
=== Individual ===
- Pac-12 Conference Men's Soccer Player of the Year (2): 2016, 2017

=== Club ===
- Stanford
  - NCAA Division I Men's Soccer Championship (3): 2015, 2016, 2017
  - Pac-12 Conference (4): 2014, 2015, 2016, 2017
