= Jeremy Gunn =

English footballer and manager

Personal information
- Date of birth: 1972 or 1973 (age 53–54)
- Place of birth: Harrogate, England
- Position: Midfielder

Youth career
- Grimsby Town
- Scunthorpe United
- 1989–1992: Cal State Bakersfield

Senior career*
Years	Team	Apps	(Gls)
1993–1995	Chico Rooks		
1998	Nashville Metros	7	(4)
1998	Charleston Battery	8	(0)

Managerial career
- 1993–1999: Cal State Bakersfield (assistant)
- 1999–2006: Fort Lewis College Skyhawks
- 2007–2011: Charlotte 49ers
- 2012–: Stanford Cardinal
- * Club domestic league appearances and goals

Jeremy Gunn is an English retired association football midfielder who is the head men's soccer coach at Stanford University. He played professionally in the USISL.

== Player ==
Gunn played in both the Grimsby Town F.C. and Scunthorpe United F.C. youth systems in his native England before coming to the United States. He attended Cal State Bakersfield where he was a 1992 First Team NCAA Division II All American soccer player. In 1993, he joined the Chico Rooks of the USISL. In 1998, he moved to the Nashville Metros. On 29 May 1998, the Metros traded Gunn to the Charleston Battery for John Jones and a 1999 draft pick.

== Coach ==
Even while playing professionally, Gunn was also coaching. In 1993, he became an assistant at Cal-State Bakersfield. In 1999, he became the head coach of the Fort Lewis College soccer team. Over eight seasons, he compiled a 123–35–17 record and won six Rocky Mountain Conference championships. He took the Skyhawks to the 1999, 2005 and 2006 NCAA Men's Division II Soccer Championship. The team won in 2005 and finished runner-up in 1999 and 2006. He was the 2005 NCAA Division II Coach of the Year. On 26 December 2006, the Charlotte 49ers hired Gunn to coach the school's men's soccer team. In 2007, he took his team to their first ever Atlantic 10 Tournament championship game. In 2011, Gunn led the 49ers to the finals of the College Cup, where they lost 1–0 to North Carolina. In December 2011, Gunn was hired as the head men's soccer coach at Stanford, leading them to National Championships in 2015, 2016, and 2017.
