= Pacific Tigers men's soccer =

- Founded: 1964 (program ended in 1985); 2014; 12 years ago (reinstated)
- University: University of the Pacific (United States)
- Head coach: Andrés Ochoa (1st. season)
- Conference: WCC; I Division
- Location: Stockton, California
- Stadium: Knoles Field (2014–present)
- Nickname: Tigers
- Colors: Black and orange
Home	Away

NCAA Tournament Round of 32
- 2016, 2017, 2018

NCAA Tournament appearances
- 2016, 2017, 2018

The Pacific Tigers men's soccer is the intercollegiate varsity soccer team representing the University of the Pacific, located in Stockton, California. The team is a member of the West Coast Conference athletic conference of NCAA Division I.

The team was established in 1964 by a group of Latin American students at Elbert Covell College. The program lasted until 1985, when it was closed by the University. In 2014, the men's soccer program was reinstated, and has remained since then.

The Tigers' current head coach is former player and captain (2014–17) Andrés Ochoa, who took position in November 2025. Ochoa is the Pacific's all-time assist leader with 12 assistances. Ochoa had previously worked as assistant coach at the University of California, Los Angeles from 2021 to 2025.

Pacific play their home matches at Knoles Field since 2014, the year the program was re-established by the University.

== History ==
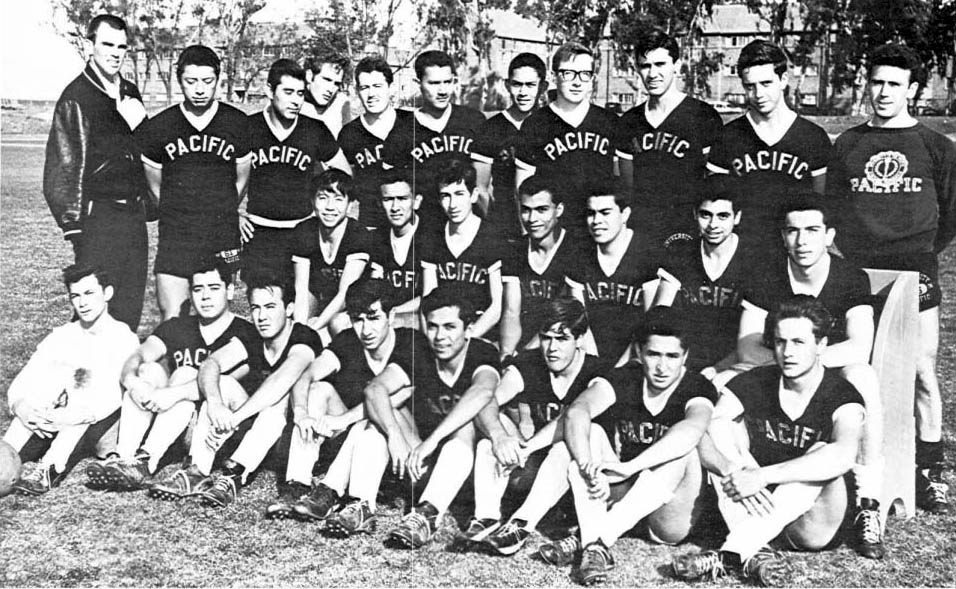
The 1964 team, the first fielded by the University

Records of a Pacific soccer team dates back to 1964, when the university fielded its first squad captained by David Cohn and Leonel Pizarro.

The team was launched by twenty-six Spanish speaking students at Elbert Covell College (a unique inter-American college established by the University in 1963, with half its students from the U.S. and half from Latin America, and classes taught in Spanish). Coached by Dick Davey, Pacific achieved a 3–3 record in their first season.

The following year saw Pacific to achieve a 5–5 record, with some remarkable wins over Chico State (6–0), Santa Clara (10–1), and San Francisco State (6–0).

In 1966 Pacific became a member of the "Northern California Intercollegiate Soccer Conference", playing a full schedule for the first time. The team had a 6–4 record that season, with 29 goals scored and 22 conceded to finish 5th. in the WCISC. The most notable win was a 6–2 to San Francisco State. In 1967 Pacific was coached by Oscar Litz, finishing the season with a 3–4–1 record, which included a notable 7–2 win over Stanford.

1969 was the debut of coach Joseph Oyewiusi, and the Tigers ended with a 65 record. Some highlights were the wins v Chico State (rated #1 at national level) 3–1, and Saint Mary's 5–1, and Santa Cruz (5–1). On the other hand, the team suffered hard defeats to Stanford (1–7) and San Francisco (0–8). Sophomore Gustavo Wilson was the leading scorer.

Pacific ended the 1971 season with a 762 record, finishing third in the WCISC. Jay Negus was the leading scorer with 7 goals. By 1973, Pacific was coached by Jim Santomier and played the season with a team mostly formed by young players who were gaining experience through the season.

Photographs and chronicles of those times are documented on the University's yearbook, The Naranjado (a Spanish form for orange, the university's primary color).

Tom Pucci, a tennis players with no experience in soccer coaching, took over the team in 1970. The season ended with a 7–4 record, ranking the Tigers 6th on the West Coast, although the team could not qualify for the NCAA tournament.

The University cut off the program in 1985, restarting it in 2014 when the Tigers rejoined the WCC. The team play their home matches at Knoles Field since then. The stadium also hosts the women's team since 2012.

Prior to joining the Big West Conference, the Tigers competed in the Pacific Soccer Conference and the Northern California Intercollegiate Soccer Conference.

Pacific in the 1960s and 1970s
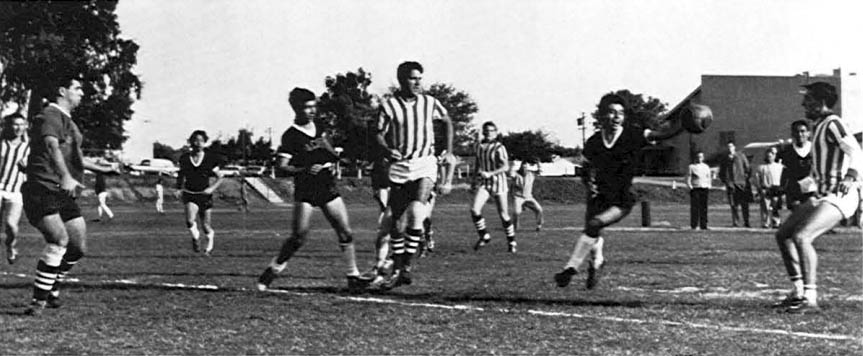
A Pacific match in 1964

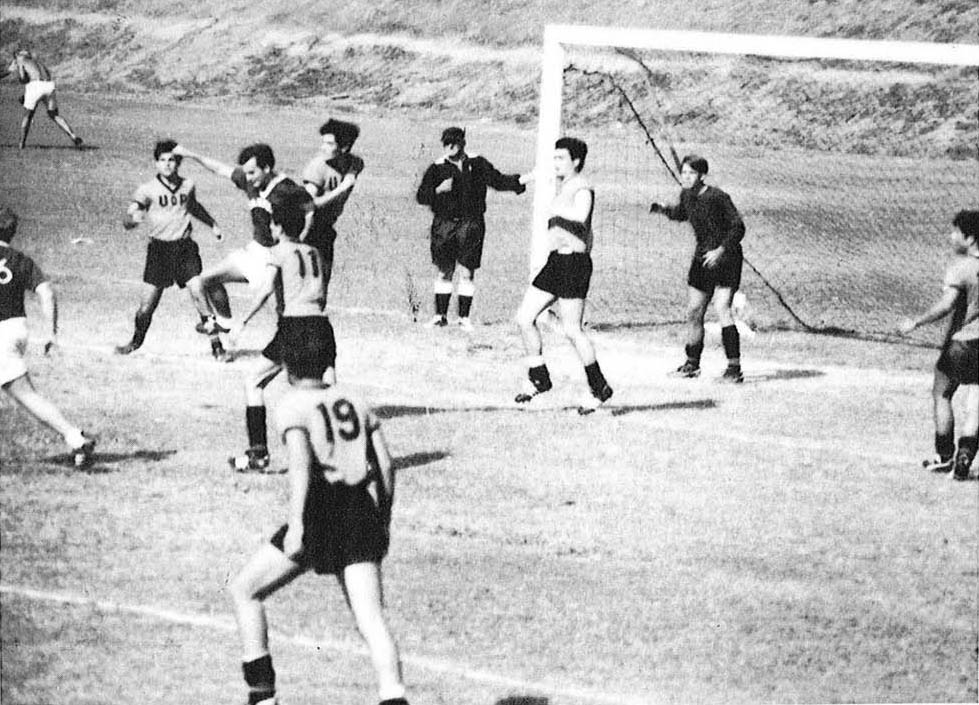
Pacific (light shirt) match, 1968

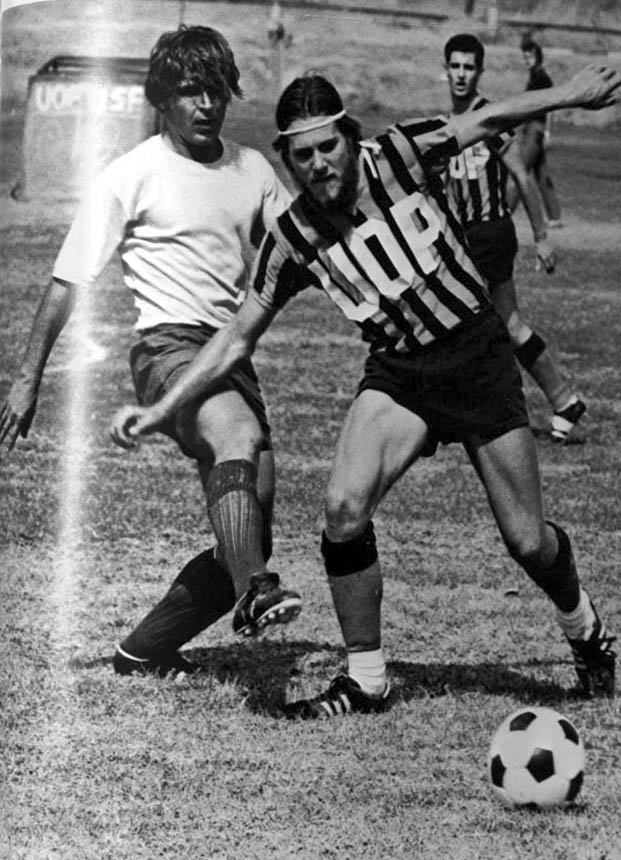
Pacific (striped shirt) match, 1970

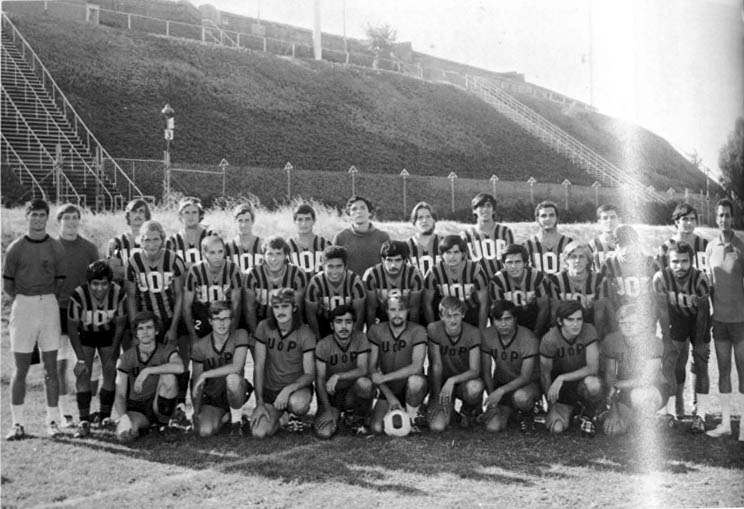
Pacific complete roster, 1970

== Stadium ==
The Tigers play their home matches at Knoles Field since 2014, the year the program was re-established by the University. On the other hand, the women's soccer team has been using the stadium since 2012.

Knoles Field has a natural grass surface, scoreboard, and a lighting system. The stadium hosted the first NCAA tournament match on November 16, 2017, when the Tigers hosted Cal State Fullerton to win 2–1 with an attendance of 564.

== Players ==
=== Current roster ===
As of January 2026

Note: Flags indicate national team as defined under FIFA eligibility rules; some limited exceptions apply. Players may hold more than one non-FIFA nationality.

No.	Pos.	Nation	Player
0	GK	USA	Juan Martinez
1	GK	USA	Mateus Ruiz-Hurst
4	DF	GHA	Muharif Abdul-Kadir
5	DF	ESP	Rodrigo Fernandez
7	FW	GHA	Josephat Yangyuoru
8	MF	USA	Daniel Govea
12	FW	USA	Maxamus Miller
13	FW	USA	Ethan Gill
16	DF	USA	Ethan Montgomery
17	FW	USA	Massimo Erfani
18	FW	USA	Ezekiel Padilla

No.	Pos.	Nation	Player
20	FW	USA	James Andrew
21	DF	USA	Carlos Maldonado
22	MF	GHA	Emmanuel Frimpong
23	DF	GHA	Aaron Folikwei
24	DF	USA	Andrew Do Carmo
25	MF	USA	Connor Louden
26	FW	USA	Caleb Cliburn
28	DF	USA	Joseph Odipo
29	GK	USA	Milo Risenhoover
30	GK	HON	Roy Jimenez
—	MF	GRE	Ionas Papaioannou

=== Records ===
- No records for the 1964–85 period

Top scorers

#	Nat.	Player	Goals	Tenure
1	(United States)	Camden Riley	19	2015–18
2	(United States)	Tristan Blackmon	16	2014–17
2	(United States)	Derick Roque	16	2019-23
3	(United States)	Ryan Her	14	2018–22
3	(United States)	Anthony Orendain	14	2016-19
4	(United States)	Julio Cervantes	11	2014–16
4	(United States)	Tariq Branche	11	2016-19
5	(United States)	Tyson Fox	8	2014–17
5	(United States)	Jonathan Jimenez	8	2018–19

Most assistances

#	Nat.	Player	Assist.	Tenure
1	(United States)	Andres Ochoa	12	2014–17
2	(Netherlands)	Bob Groenendijk	10	2016-18
2	(United States)	Camden Riley	10	2015–18
3	(United States)	Tristan Blackmon	9	2014–17
3	(United States)	Derick Roque	9	2019–23
3	(United States)	Ryan Herr	9	2018-22
4	(United States)	Anthony Orendain	8	2016–19
5	(United States)	Alfredo Alcala	7	2015–18
5	(France)	Yazid Omri	7	2020–22
5	(Japan)	Mamoru Kamisasanuki	7	2018–21

=== Professional players ===
Pacific players that play/have played at professional levels are:

Nat.	Player	Pro.	Professional career (teams)	Ref.
(United States)	Camden Riley	2019	Sporting Kansas City, Rio Grande Valley, San Diego Loyal, Oakland Roots	

== Coaches ==
=== Current staff ===
As of 15 December 2025

Position	Name
Head coach	Andres Ochoa
Assist. coach	Brian Lanoye

=== Coaching history ===
As of December 2025

#	Name	Tenure	Seasons	Record
1	Ryan Jorden	2014–18	5	42–43–7
2	Adam Reeves	2019–25	7	29–50—13
3	Andrés Ochoa	2025–present		

== Team statistics ==
=== NCAA appearances ===
Pacific's appearances in NCAA tournaments (NCAA D-I tournament are listed below:

Key

- a.e.t. – Match went to extra time
- p – Match decided by a penalty shootout after extra time

Season	Stage	Rival	Res.	Score
2016	First round	Cal State Northridge	W	1–0
2016	Second round	Stanford	L	0–2
2017	First round	Cal State Fullerton	W	2–1
2017	Second round	Stanford	L	0–0 (1–4 p)
2018	First round	UC Riverside	W	1–0
2018	Second round	Duke	L	0–1
