= Bryce Marion =

American soccer player (born 1996)

Personal information
- Date of birth: February 13, 1996 (age 30)
- Place of birth: Lake Charles, Louisiana, United States
- Height: 5 ft 7 in (1.70 m)
- Position: Winger

Youth career
- 2010–2013: Texans SC Houston
- 2013–2014: Houston Dynamo

College career
Years	Team	Apps	(Gls)
2014–2017	Stanford Cardinal	55	(1)

Senior career*
Years	Team	Apps	(Gls)
2016–2017	San Francisco City	6	(0)
2018	Rio Grande Valley FC Toros	13	(0)
- * Club domestic league appearances and goals as of 15:39, 16 October 2018 (UTC)

Bryce Marion (born February 13, 1996) is an American soccer player.

== Career ==
=== Youth and college ===
Marion played four years of college soccer at Stanford University between 2014 and 2017. While with the Cardinal, Marion made 55 appearances, scoring one goal and tallying nine assists.

Marion also played for Premier Development League side San Francisco City in 2016 and 2017.

=== Professional ===
In May 2018, Marion joined United Soccer League side Rio Grande Valley FC Toros. Marion made his professional debut on May 9, 2018, appearing as a stoppage-time substitute in a 2–2 draw with Fresno FC.

== Personal life ==
As a child, Marion moved from Louisiana to Houston to Norway to Alaska before returning to Houston.
