= 2016 NCAA Division I men's soccer season =

American college soccer season

- Number of teams: 206
- Preseason No. 1: Stanford
- TV partner/s: ESPNU, BTN, P12N, ACCN
- Hermann Trophy: Ian Harkes, Wake Forest
- Top goalscorer: Albert Ruiz, Florida Gulf Coast (22)

Statistics
- Biggest home win: Buffalo 9–0 Daemen (Aug. 26)
- Biggest away win: Akron 7–0 NIU (Oct. 15)
- Highest scoring: FGCU 6–5 Rutgers (Sept. 27)
- Longest winning run: 15 – Maryland (Sept. 13–Nov. 13)
- Longest unbeaten run: 23 – Denver (Aug. 26–Dec. 9)
- Longest winless run: 52 – VMI (Since 09/12/2014)
- Longest losing run: 49 – VMI (Since 09/23/2014)
- Highest attendance: Home field–11,424 @ UCSB vs Cal Poly (October 22); 1st game–11,075 @ Cal Poly vs UCSB (October 15); Neutral field–10,092 Army vs Navy @ Chester, PA (September 23)
- Lowest attendance: Home field & Neutral field Several reported as 0– Probably incorrect, but official

Tournament
- Duration: November 17 – December 11, 2016
- Most conference bids: ACC (9)

College Cup
- Date: December 9 – 11, 2016
- Site: BBVA Compass Stadium
- Champions: Stanford
- Runners-up: Wake Forest

Seasons
- ← 2015 2017 →

The 2016 NCAA Division I men's soccer season was the 58th season of NCAA championship men's college soccer. The regular season began on August 26 and continued into the first weekend of November 2016. The season culminated with the 2016 NCAA Division I Men's Soccer Championship in December 2016. There were 206 teams in men's Division I competition. The defending champions were Stanford who defeated Clemson 4–0 to win its first NCAA soccer title. The season concluded with Stanford defending its title by defeating Wake Forest 5–4 in a penalty kick shootout following a 0–0 double-overtime draw.

== Changes from 2015 ==
=== Coaching changes ===
| Program | Outgoing coach | Manner of departure | Date of vacancy | Incoming coach | Date of appointment |
|---|---|---|---|---|---|
| Appalachian State | Matt Nelson | Not retained | November 17, 2015 | Jason O’Keefe | January 26, 2016 |
| Cornell | Jaro Zawislan | Not retained | Was not announced | John Smith | March 8, 2016 |
| Georgia Southern | Kevin Kennedy | Not retained | Was not announced | John Murphy | July 26, 2016 |
| Iona | Fernando Barboto | Head coach at NJIT | January 24, 2016 | James Hamilton | April 26, 2016 |
| IUPUI | Isang Jacob | Resigned | July 18, 2016 | Brian Barnett | August 7, 2016 |
| La Salle | Pat Farrell | Retired | June 28, 2016 | Rob Irvine | July 28, 2016 |
| Navy | Dave Brandt | To Pittsburgh Riverhounds | May 23, 2016 | Tim O'Donohue | July 1, 2016 |
| NJIT | Didier Orellana | Resigned | Was not announced | Fernando Barboto | January 24, 2016 |
| Niagara | Eric Barnes | Not retained | November 9, 2015 | Bill Boyle | January 15, 2016 |
| Northeastern | Brian Ainscough | Resigned | November 13, 2015 | Chris Gbandi | January 11, 2016 |
| Pittsburgh | Joe Luxbacher | Retired | November 3, 2015 | Jay Vidovich | December 5, 2016 |
| Portland | Bill Irwin | Retired | November 24, 2015 | Nick Carlin-Voigt | January 12, 2016 |
| Presbyterian | Bret Boulware | Not retained | December 15, 2015 | Jonathan Potter | December 15, 2015 |
| Stetson | Ernie Yarborough | Not retained | June 27, 2016 | Jared Vock (Interim) | June 27, 2016 |
| VMI | Jon Freeman | Resigned | April 6, 2016 | Michael Bonelli | May 17, 2016 |
| Winthrop | Rich Posipanko | Retired | December 18, 2015 | Daniel Ridenhour | December 18, 2015 |

=== New programs ===
Chicago State was initially budgeted to finally start competition in the Western Athletic Conference this season. However, the ongoing State of Illinois budgetary crisis and the school's own critical financial problems have set this back once more.

Mount St. Mary's University announced that their soccer program, which has been dormant since the end of the 2012 season, will be reinstated for the 2018 season.

=== Discontinued programs ===
None.

=== Conference realignment ===
| School | Previous Conference | New Conference |
|---|---|---|
| Coastal Carolina | Big South Conference | Sun Belt Conference |
| NJIT | Sun Belt Conference | Atlantic Sun Conference |

=== Video review ===
The NCAA Playing Rules Oversight Panel approved voluntary video review for the 2016 season. Video may be used to determine whether a goal has been scored, to identify players for disciplinary matters, and to determine whether a fight occurred and identify the participants.

Use of video review in both men's and women's soccer is strictly voluntary, with coaches for both teams agreeing to its use before the game. The home team is responsible for the equipment and for making review possible either at the scorer's table or at another ground-level location. As in other NCAA sports, the video review must display indisputable evidence for a call to be overturned.

=== Proposed Division I season change ===
After many months of extended unofficial discussion, on August 22, 2016, NCAA Division I men's coaches and the National Soccer Coaches Association of America (NSCAA) officially began an "informational campaign" to build support for a proposed change of the playing schedule for Division I men's soccer. Under the proposed changes of the "Academic Year Season Model", the number of games on the Fall schedule and the number of mid-week games would be reduced, with games added in the Spring following a Winter break, and the NCAA Division I Men's Soccer Championship tournament would be moved from November and December to May and June. In addition to more closely matching the professional season, the changes address issues of player health and safety and of the time demands on student-athletes. The proposal concerns only Division I men's soccer. While a large majority of men's coaches and players support the changes, only a small minority of women's coaches and players currently do so. At this time, there is only the "informational campaign" "...to educate our Athletic Directors, NCAA leadership, student athletes, coaches and fans on the advantages of this Academic Year Model,” said Sasho Cirovski, NSCAA D1 Men's committee chair and University of Maryland head coach. No formal proposal has been made to the NCAA, and once proposed, could not come into effect any earlier than the 2017–18 academic year.

== Season overview ==
=== Pre-season polls ===
NSCAA
| Rank | Team |
|---|---|
| 1 | Stanford |
| 2 | Akron |
| 3 | Clemson |
| 4 | Maryland |
| 5 | Wake Forest |
| 6 | Syracuse |
| 7 | Creighton |
| 8 | North Carolina |
| 9 | Notre Dame |
| 10 | Georgetown |
| 11 | Boston College |
| 12 | SMU |
| 13 | UC Santa Barbara |
| 14 | Seattle |
| 15 | Indiana |
| 16 | UCLA |
| 17 | Virginia |
| 18 | Ohio State |
| 19 | South Florida |
| 20 | Denver |
| 21 | Coastal Carolina |
| 22 | Charlotte |
| 23 | FIU |
| 24 | South Carolina |
| 25 | Rutgers |

College Soccer News
| Rank | Team |
|---|---|
| 1 | Stanford |
| 2 | Akron |
| 3 | Maryland |
| 4 | Clemson |
| 5 | Wake Forest |
| 6 | North Carolina |
| 7 | Georgetown |
| 8 | Boston College |
| 9 | Creighton |
| 10 | SMU |
| 11 | Syracuse |
| 12 | Seattle |
| 13 | UCLA |
| 14 | Indiana |
| 15 | Denver |
| 16 | UC Santa Barbara |
| 17 | Notre Dame |
| 18 | Ohio State |
| 19 | South Florida |
| 20 | Virginia |
| 21 | South Carolina |
| 22 | Connecticut |
| 23 | Kentucky |
| 24 | Charlotte |
| 25 | FIU |

Soccer America
| Rank | Team |
|---|---|
| 1 | Akron |
| 2 | Stanford |
| 3 | UCLA |
| 4 | Maryland |
| 5 | North Carolina |
| 6 | Clemson |
| 7 | Wake Forest |
| 8 | Boston College |
| 9 | Creighton |
| 10 | Syracuse |
| 11 | UC Santa Barbara |
| 12 | Georgetown |
| 13 | Indiana |
| 14 | SMU |
| 15 | Notre Dame |
| 16 | Denver |
| 17 | Seattle |
| 18 | Ohio State |
| 19 | Washington |
| 20 | Virginia |
| 21 | South Florida |
| 22 | Xavier |
| 23 | California |
| 24 | Kentucky |
| 25 | Connecticut |

Top Drawer Soccer
| Rank | Team |
|---|---|
| 1 | North Carolina |
| 2 | Maryland |
| 3 | Akron |
| 4 | Stanford |
| 5 | Syracuse |
| 6 | UCLA |
| 7 | Georgetown |
| 8 | SMU |
| 9 | Seattle |
| 10 | Clemson |
| 11 | Wake Forest |
| 12 | Denver |
| 13 | Indiana |
| 14 | Creighton |
| 15 | Boston College |
| 16 | Connecticut |
| 17 | South Florida |
| 18 | Coastal Carolina |
| 19 | Notre Dame |
| 20 | Washington |
| 21 | Kentucky |
| 22 | Dartmouth |
| 23 | UC Santa Barbara |
| 24 | Utah Valley |
| 25 | South Carolina |

== Regular season ==
=== #1 ===
Weekly NSCAA #1 ranked team
| Date | Team | Date | Team | Date | Team | Date | Team |
|---|---|---|---|---|---|---|---|
| August 2 (preseason) | Stanford | None until after season starts | | August 30 | Akron | September 6 | Notre Dame |
| September 13 | Notre Dame | September 20 | Maryland | September 27 | Maryland | October 4 | Maryland |
| October 11 | Maryland | October 18 | Maryland | October 25 | Maryland | November 1 | Maryland |
| November 8 | Maryland | November 15 | Maryland | None until after tournament | | December 13 | Stanford |

=== Conference standings ===
2016 America East Conference men's soccer standings
| | Conf. | | | | | Overall |
| Team | W | | L | | T | W | | L | | T |
|---|---|---|---|---|---|---|---|---|---|---|
| No. 19 UMass Lowell ^{#} | 5 | – | 1 | – | 1 | 13 | – | 1 | – | 2 |
| No. 17 Albany ‡ | 4 | – | 2 | – | 1 | 13 | – | 6 | – | 2 |
| Stony Brook | 4 | – | 2 | – | 1 | 9 | – | 6 | – | 3 |
| New Hampshire | 4 | – | 3 | – | 0 | 12 | – | 7 | – | 0 |
| Vermont + | 4 | – | 3 | – | 0 | 14 | – | 7 | – | 1 |
| Hartford | 2 | – | 3 | – | 2 | 9 | – | 10 | – | 3 |
| Binghamton | 1 | – | 3 | – | 3 | 7 | – | 6 | – | 6 |
| UMBC | 0 | – | 7 | – | 0 | 5 | – | 9 | – | 3 |
‡ - Tournament champion +- Invited to the NCAA Division I Men's Soccer Championship ^{#}-Ineligible (In transition); As of 13 December 2116; Rankings from NSCAA

2016 American Athletic Conference men's soccer standings
| | Conf. | | | | | Overall |
| Team | W | | L | | T | W | | L | | T |
|---|---|---|---|---|---|---|---|---|---|---|
| South Florida + | 6 | – | 1 | – | 0 | 10 | – | 6 | – | 4 |
| Tulsa ‡ | 4 | – | 2 | – | 1 | 10 | – | 5 | – | 5 |
| Connecticut | 3 | – | 3 | – | 1 | 11 | – | 7 | – | 1 |
| Cincinnati | 3 | – | 4 | – | 0 | 9 | – | 7 | – | 1 |
| UCF | 3 | – | 4 | – | 0 | 5 | – | 11 | – | 0 |
| Temple | 2 | – | 3 | – | 2 | 10 | – | 6 | – | 2 |
| Memphis | 2 | – | 4 | – | 1 | 8 | – | 8 | – | 1 |
| SMU | 2 | – | 4 | – | 1 | 6 | – | 9 | – | 1 |
‡ – Tournament champion + – Invited to the NCAA Division I Men's Soccer Championship; As of 13 December 2016; Rankings from NSCAA

2016 Atlantic 10 Conference men's soccer standings
| | Conf. | | | | | Overall |
| Team | W | | L | | T | W | | L | | T |
|---|---|---|---|---|---|---|---|---|---|---|
| Saint Louis | 6 | – | 2 | – | 0 | 7 | – | 8 | – | 3 |
| Fordham ‡ | 5 | – | 2 | – | 1 | 10 | – | 7 | – | 4 |
| LaSalle | 5 | – | 3 | – | 0 | 10 | – | 8 | – | 1 |
| UMass | 4 | – | 2 | – | 2 | 7 | – | 9 | – | 3 |
| VCU | 4 | – | 3 | – | 1 | 8 | – | 9 | – | 4 |
| Rhode Island | 4 | – | 4 | – | 0 | 8 | – | 11 | – | 1 |
| Duquesne | 3 | – | 2 | – | 3 | 8 | – | 5 | – | 5 |
| Dayton | 3 | – | 3 | – | 2 | 7 | – | 9 | – | 3 |
| George Washington | 3 | – | 3 | – | 2 | 8 | – | 5 | – | 5 |
| St. Bonaventure | 3 | – | 4 | – | 1 | 4 | – | 12 | – | 2 |
| Saint Joseph's | 3 | – | 5 | – | 0 | 6 | – | 11 | – | 1 |
| Davidson | 2 | – | 5 | – | 1 | 4 | – | 12 | – | 1 |
| George Mason | 0 | – | 7 | – | 1 | 2 | – | 12 | – | 2 |
‡- 2016 Atlantic 10 Tournament +- Invited to the NCAA Division I Men's Soccer Championship; As of 18 November 2016; Rankings from NSCAA

2016 ACC men's soccer standings
| | Conf. | | | | | Overall |
| Team | W | | L | | T | W | | L | | T |
|---|---|---|---|---|---|---|---|---|---|---|
Atlantic
| No. 2 Wake Forest ‡ | 5 | – | 1 | – | 2 | 19 | – | 2 | – | 4 |
| No. 6 Louisville + | 5 | – | 2 | – | 1 | 14 | – | 6 | – | 2 |
| No. 5 Clemson + | 4 | – | 1 | – | 3 | 14 | – | 4 | – | 5 |
| No. 11 Syracuse + | 4 | – | 2 | – | 3 | 12 | – | 4 | – | 4 |
| Boston College + | 3 | – | 3 | – | 3 | 9 | – | 9 | – | 3 |
| NC State | 1 | – | 8 | – | 0 | 5 | – | 12 | – | 0 |
Coastal
| No. 4 North Carolina + | 5 | – | 1 | – | 2 | 14 | – | 3 | – | 4 |
| No. 13 Virginia + | 4 | – | 2 | – | 3 | 11 | – | 4 | – | 5 |
| No. 14 Notre Dame + | 4 | – | 3 | – | 2 | 12 | – | 7 | – | 2 |
| No. 8 Virginia Tech + | 3 | – | 4 | – | 2 | 13 | – | 5 | – | 4 |
| Duke | 2 | – | 6 | – | 1 | 7 | – | 8 | – | 2 |
| Pittsburgh | 0 | – | 7 | – | 2 | 2 | – | 13 | – | 3 |
‡-2016 ACC Tournament champion + - Invited to the NCAA Division I Men's Soccer Championship; As of 13 December 2016; Rankings from NSCAA

2016 Atlantic Sun Conference men's soccer standings
| | Conf. | | | | | Overall |
| Team | W | | L | | T | W | | L | | T |
|---|---|---|---|---|---|---|---|---|---|---|
| North Florida | 5 | – | 0 | – | 1 | 9 | – | 4 | – | 2 |
| No. 20 FGCU ‡ | 4 | – | 1 | – | 1 | 14 | – | 4 | – | 3 |
| Lipscomb | 3 | – | 2 | – | 1 | 10 | – | 6 | – | 2 |
| NJIT | 3 | – | 2 | – | 1 | 8 | – | 6 | – | 4 |
| Jacksonville | 2 | – | 4 | – | 0 | 8 | – | 10 | – | 0 |
| Stetson | 1 | – | 5 | – | 0 | 4 | – | 10 | – | 2 |
| USC Upstate | 1 | – | 5 | – | 0 | 3 | – | 10 | – | 0 |
‡-2016 ASUN Tournament champion +- Invited to the 2016 NCAA Division I Men's Soccer Championship; As of 13 December 2016; Rankings from NSCAA

2016 Big East Conference men's soccer standings
| | Conf. | | | | | Overall |
| Team | W | | L | | T | W | | L | | T |
|---|---|---|---|---|---|---|---|---|---|---|
| No. 10 Providence + | 7 | – | 2 | – | 0 | 15 | – | 7 | – | 0 |
| No. 18 Butler ‡ | 6 | – | 3 | – | 0 | 13 | – | 5 | – | 2 |
| No. 15 Creighton + | 5 | – | 3 | – | 1 | 13 | – | 7 | – | 3 |
| Villanova + | 5 | – | 3 | – | 1 | 10 | – | 8 | – | 2 |
| Xavier | 4 | – | 4 | – | 1 | 8 | – | 8 | – | 3 |
| DePaul | 4 | – | 5 | – | 0 | 9 | – | 7 | – | 3 |
| Georgetown | 3 | – | 4 | – | 2 | 6 | – | 9 | – | 2 |
| Saint John's | 2 | – | 5 | – | 2 | 6 | – | 7 | – | 4 |
| Marquette | 2 | – | 5 | – | 2 | 5 | – | 7 | – | 4 |
| Seton Hall | 2 | – | 6 | – | 1 | 4 | – | 11 | – | 2 |
‡-Tournament champion +- Invited to the NCAA Division I Men's Soccer Championship; As of 13 December 2016; Rankings from NSCAA

2016 Big South Conference men's soccer standings
| | Conf. | | | | | Overall |
| Team | W | | L | | T | W | | L | | T |
|---|---|---|---|---|---|---|---|---|---|---|
| Radford ‡ | 7 | – | 1 | – | 0 | 14 | – | 4 | – | 2 |
| High Point | 5 | – | 1 | – | 2 | 11 | – | 4 | – | 4 |
| UNC Asheville | 5 | – | 3 | – | 0 | 6 | – | 13 | – | 0 |
| Liberty | 4 | – | 3 | – | 1 | 7 | – | 9 | – | 2 |
| Presbyterian | 4 | – | 4 | – | 0 | 7 | – | 10 | – | 3 |
| Longwood | 3 | – | 5 | – | 0 | 8 | – | 12 | – | 1 |
| Gardner–Webb | 2 | – | 5 | – | 1 | 4 | – | 11 | – | 1 |
| Winthrop | 2 | – | 6 | – | 0 | 5 | – | 10 | – | 2 |
| Campbell | 2 | – | 6 | – | 0 | 5 | – | 11 | – | 1 |
‡-Tournament champion +- Invited to the NCAA Division I Men's Soccer Championship; As of 18 November 2016; Rankings from NSCAA

2016 Big Ten Conference men's soccer standings
| | Conf. | | | | | Overall |
| Team | W | | L | | T | W | | L | | T |
|---|---|---|---|---|---|---|---|---|---|---|
| No. 7 Maryland ‡ | 7 | – | 0 | – | 1 | 18 | – | 1 | – | 2 |
| No. 9 Indiana + | 3 | – | 0 | – | 5 | 12 | – | 2 | – | 7 |
| Wisconsin | 4 | – | 2 | – | 2 | 11 | – | 4 | – | 4 |
| No. 25 Michigan State + | 4 | – | 3 | – | 1 | 13 | – | 5 | – | 2 |
| Penn State | 4 | – | 4 | – | 0 | 8 | – | 8 | – | 2 |
| Ohio State | 3 | – | 4 | – | 1 | 5 | – | 13 | – | 1 |
| Northwestern | 3 | – | 4 | – | 1 | 6 | – | 11 | – | 1 |
| Michigan | 1 | – | 6 | – | 1 | 4 | – | 11 | – | 4 |
| Rutgers | 0 | – | 6 | – | 2 | 1 | – | 14 | – | 2 |
‡-Tournament champion +- Invited to the NCAA Division I Men's Soccer Championship; As of 13 December 2016; Rankings from NSCAA

2016 Big West Conference men's soccer standings
| | Conf. | | | | | Overall |
| Team | W | | L | | T | W | | L | | T |
|---|---|---|---|---|---|---|---|---|---|---|
North
| UC Santa Barbara | 6 | – | 1 | – | 3 | 10 | – | 7 | – | 3 |
| Sacramento State | 4 | – | 5 | – | 1 | 9 | – | 8 | – | 3 |
| UC Davis | 4 | – | 6 | – | 0 | 8 | – | 10 | – | 2 |
| Cal Poly | 3 | – | 5 | – | 2 | 5 | – | 9 | – | 3 |
South
| CSU Northridge ‡ | 5 | – | 2 | – | 3 | 9 | – | 7 | – | 5 |
| Cal St. Fullerton | 4 | – | 3 | – | 3 | 11 | – | 9 | – | 3 |
| UC Riverside | 4 | – | 5 | – | 1 | 8 | – | 10 | – | 2 |
| UC Irvine | 3 | – | 5 | – | 1 | 5 | – | 13 | – | 1 |
‡-Tournament champion +- Invited to the NCAA Division I Men's Soccer Championship; As of 18 November 2016; Rankings from NSCAA

2016 Colonial Athletic Association men's soccer standings
| | Conf. | | | | | Overall |
| Team | W | | L | | T | W | | L | | T |
|---|---|---|---|---|---|---|---|---|---|---|
| Hofstra | 7 | – | 1 | – | 0 | 9 | – | 8 | – | 1 |
| Delaware ‡ | 5 | – | 3 | – | 0 | 11 | – | 8 | – | 1 |
| UNC Wilmington | 3 | – | 2 | – | 3 | 8 | – | 6 | – | 3 |
| Elon | 3 | – | 2 | – | 3 | 7 | – | 7 | – | 4 |
| William & Mary | 3 | – | 3 | – | 2 | 13 | – | 7 | – | 2 |
| Charleston | 3 | – | 3 | – | 2 | 6 | – | 9 | – | 3 |
| James Madison | 3 | – | 3 | – | 2 | 5 | – | 9 | – | 3 |
| Northeastern | 3 | – | 5 | – | 0 | 6 | – | 11 | – | 0 |
| Drexel | 0 | – | 8 | – | 0 | 1 | – | 14 | – | 2 |
‡-Tournament champion +- Invited to the 2016 NCAA Division I Men's Soccer Championship; As of 18 November 2016; Rankings from NSCAA

2016 Conference USA men's soccer standings
| | Conf. | | | | | Overall |
| Team | W | | L | | T | W | | L | | T |
|---|---|---|---|---|---|---|---|---|---|---|
| No. 16 Charlotte + | 7 | – | 1 | – | 0 | 12 | – | 4 | – | 2 |
| South Carolina + | 5 | – | 2 | – | 1 | 11 | – | 8 | – | 1 |
| Fla. International | 5 | – | 2 | – | 1 | 10 | – | 7 | – | 2 |
| No. 23 Kentucky + | 5 | – | 3 | – | 0 | 11 | – | 5 | – | 3 |
| New Mexico ‡ | 4 | – | 3 | – | 1 | 12 | – | 7 | – | 3 |
| UAB | 2 | – | 5 | – | 1 | 6 | – | 9 | – | 3 |
| Old Dominion | 2 | – | 5 | – | 1 | 6 | – | 9 | – | 2 |
| Florida Atlantic | 2 | – | 6 | – | 0 | 4 | – | 10 | – | 1 |
| Marshall | 1 | – | 6 | – | 1 | 6 | – | 11 | – | 1 |
‡-Tournament champion +- Invited to the NCAA Division I Men's Soccer Championship; As of 13 December 2016; Rankings from NSCAA

2016 Horizon League men's soccer standings
| | Conf. | | | | | Overall |
| Team | W | | L | | T | W | | L | | T |
|---|---|---|---|---|---|---|---|---|---|---|
| Wright State | 7 | – | 1 | – | 1 | 11 | – | 6 | – | 3 |
| Milwaukee | 5 | – | 3 | – | 1 | 8 | – | 8 | – | 2 |
| UIC ‡ | 5 | – | 3 | – | 1 | 9 | – | 8 | – | 3 |
| Oakland | 5 | – | 4 | – | 0 | 6 | – | 10 | – | 1 |
| Valparaiso | 4 | – | 3 | – | 2 | 12 | – | 4 | – | 3 |
| Cleveland State | 4 | – | 3 | – | 2 | 7 | – | 8 | – | 2 |
| Green Bay | 4 | – | 3 | – | 2 | 5 | – | 9 | – | 2 |
| Belmont | 2 | – | 5 | – | 2 | 3 | – | 12 | – | 3 |
| Detroit | 1 | – | 6 | – | 2 | 3 | – | 10 | – | 4 |
| Northern Kentucky | 1 | – | 7 | – | 1 | 1 | – | 12 | – | 4 |
‡-Tournament champion +-Invited to the NCAA Division I Men's Soccer Championship Date= 18 November 2016; Rankings from NSCAA

2016 Ivy League men's soccer standings
| | Conf. | | | | | Overall |
| Team | W | | L | | T | W | | L | | T |
|---|---|---|---|---|---|---|---|---|---|---|
| Columbia ‡x | 5 | – | 1 | – | 1 | 12 | – | 3 | – | 1 |
| Dartmouth ‡ | 5 | – | 1 | – | 1 | 8 | – | 5 | – | 5 |
| Brown | 3 | – | 3 | – | 1 | 8 | – | 8 | – | 1 |
| Penn | 3 | – | 3 | – | 1 | 5 | – | 5 | – | 6 |
| Princeton | 1 | – | 3 | – | 2 | 7 | – | 7 | – | 2 |
| Yale | 1 | – | 4 | – | 2 | 3 | – | 10 | – | 2 |
| Cornell | 0 | – | 6 | – | 0 | 1 | – | 13 | – | 2 |
| Harvard # | 4 | – | 0 | – | 1 | 10 | – | 3 | – | 2 |
‡-Conference champion x- Not invited to the NCAA Division I Men's Soccer Championship #- Ineligible (self-imposed sanctions); As of 21 November 2016; Rankings from NSCAA

2016 Metro Atlantic Athletic Conference men's soccer standings
| | Conf. | | | | | Overall |
| Team | W | | L | | T | W | | L | | T |
|---|---|---|---|---|---|---|---|---|---|---|
| Quinnipiac | 8 | – | 2 | – | 0 | 13 | – | 7 | – | 0 |
| Rider ‡ | 7 | – | 1 | – | 2 | 13 | – | 4 | – | 3 |
| Siena | 6 | – | 3 | – | 1 | 8 | – | 8 | – | 5 |
| Marist | 6 | – | 4 | – | 0 | 11 | – | 7 | – | 1 |
| Canisius | 4 | – | 3 | – | 3 | 9 | – | 8 | – | 3 |
| Monmouth | 5 | – | 5 | – | 0 | 6 | – | 9 | – | 2 |
| Iona | 4 | – | 6 | – | 0 | 5 | – | 13 | – | 0 |
| Fairfield | 3 | – | 6 | – | 1 | 5 | – | 9 | – | 3 |
| Niagara | 3 | – | 6 | – | 1 | 4 | – | 11 | – | 2 |
| Manhattan | 2 | – | 6 | – | 2 | 2 | – | 12 | – | 3 |
| Saint Peter's | 2 | – | 8 | – | 0 | 3 | – | 13 | – | 2 |
‡-Tournament Champion +- Invited to the NCAA Division I Men's Soccer Championship; As of 18 November 2016; Rankings from NSCAA

2016 Mid-American Conference men's soccer standings
| | Conf. | | | | | Overall |
| Team | W | | L | | T | W | | L | | T |
|---|---|---|---|---|---|---|---|---|---|---|
| No. 24 Akron ‡ | 3 | – | 1 | – | 1 | 13 | – | 6 | – | 3 |
| Bowling Green | 2 | – | 0 | – | 3 | 9 | – | 6 | – | 4 |
| Buffalo | 2 | – | 1 | – | 2 | 12 | – | 4 | – | 3 |
| Western Michigan | 1 | – | 1 | – | 3 | 9 | – | 6 | – | 4 |
| Northern Illinois | 1 | – | 3 | – | 1 | 2 | – | 10 | – | 4 |
| West Virginia | 1 | – | 4 | – | 0 | 8 | – | 7 | – | 1 |
‡-Tournament Champion +-Invited to the 2016 NCAA Tournament; As of 13 December 2016; Rankings from NSCAA

2016 Missouri Valley Conference men's soccer standings
| | Conf. | | | | | Overall |
| Team | W | | L | | T | W | | L | | T |
|---|---|---|---|---|---|---|---|---|---|---|
| No. 21 Loyola Chicago + | 6 | – | 1 | – | 1 | 14 | – | 4 | – | 1 |
| No. 22 SIUE ‡ | 4 | – | 1 | – | 3 | 10 | – | 5 | – | 7 |
| Evansville | 4 | – | 2 | – | 2 | 9 | – | 8 | – | 3 |
| Central Arkansas | 4 | – | 3 | – | 1 | 7 | – | 7 | – | 3 |
| Missouri State | 3 | – | 4 | – | 1 | 9 | – | 8 | – | 2 |
| Drake | 2 | – | 5 | – | 1 | 6 | – | 12 | – | 1 |
| Bradley | 0 | – | 7 | – | 1 | 2 | – | 15 | – | 3 |
‡-MVC Tournament Champion +-Invited to the NCAA Division I Men's Soccer Championship; As of 13 December 2016; Rankings from NSCAA

2016 Northeast Conference men's soccer standings
| | Conf. | | | | | Overall |
| Team | W | | L | | T | W | | L | | T |
|---|---|---|---|---|---|---|---|---|---|---|
| St. Francis Brooklyn ‡ | 6 | – | 0 | – | 1 | 12 | – | 6 | – | 3 |
| Saint Francis (PA) | 4 | – | 1 | – | 2 | 12 | – | 6 | – | 2 |
| LIU Brooklyn | 4 | – | 2 | – | 1 | 10 | – | 6 | – | 2 |
| Sacred Heart | 3 | – | 4 | – | 0 | 5 | – | 11 | – | 2 |
| Bryant | 2 | – | 2 | – | 3 | 3 | – | 10 | – | 3 |
| Fairleigh Dickinson | 1 | – | 3 | – | 3 | 3 | – | 11 | – | 3 |
| Robert Morris | 1 | – | 5 | – | 1 | 4 | – | 11 | – | 2 |
| Central Connecticut | 1 | – | 5 | – | 1 | 2 | – | 12 | – | 3 |
‡-Tournament champion + - Invited to the NCAA Division I Men's Soccer Championship; As of 18 November 2016; Rankings from NSCAA

2016 Pac-12 Conference men's soccer standings
| | Conf. | | | | | Overall |
| Team | W | | L | | T | W | | L | | T |
|---|---|---|---|---|---|---|---|---|---|---|
| No. 1 Stanford ‡ | 8 | – | 1 | – | 1 | 14 | – | 3 | – | 6 |
| No. 12 Washington + | 6 | – | 4 | – | 0 | 14 | – | 7 | – | 0 |
| San Diego State + | 4 | – | 3 | – | 3 | 9 | – | 4 | – | 6 |
| UCLA + | 4 | – | 5 | – | 1 | 10 | – | 8 | – | 2 |
| Oregon State | 3 | – | 5 | – | 2 | 7 | – | 8 | – | 3 |
| California | 1 | – | 8 | – | 1 | 5 | – | 10 | – | 2 |
‡-Conference champion + - Invited to the 2016 NCAA Division I Men's Soccer Championship; As of 13 December 2016; Rankings from NSCAA

2016 Patriot League men's soccer standings
| | Conf. | | | | | Overall |
| Team | W | | L | | T | W | | L | | T |
|---|---|---|---|---|---|---|---|---|---|---|
| American | 7 | – | 1 | – | 1 | 11 | – | 5 | – | 5 |
| Loyola Maryland | 6 | – | 1 | – | 2 | 8 | – | 7 | – | 3 |
| Colgate ‡ | 5 | – | 3 | – | 1 | 13 | – | 7 | – | 2 |
| Boston U. | 4 | – | 3 | – | 2 | 9 | – | 6 | – | 3 |
| Army | 4 | – | 4 | – | 1 | 9 | – | 8 | – | 2 |
| Bucknell | 4 | – | 4 | – | 1 | 7 | – | 11 | – | 3 |
| Lafayette | 3 | – | 5 | – | 1 | 7 | – | 9 | – | 2 |
| Lehigh | 3 | – | 6 | – | 0 | 7 | – | 10 | – | 1 |
| Holy Cross | 1 | – | 5 | – | 3 | 5 | – | 10 | – | 3 |
| Navy | 1 | – | 6 | – | 2 | 5 | – | 9 | – | 4 |
‡-Tournament Champion +-Invited to the NCAA Division I Men's Soccer Championship; As of 18 November 2016; Rankings from NSCAA

2016 Southern Conference men's soccer standings
| | Conf. | | | | | Overall |
| Team | W | | L | | T | W | | L | | T |
|---|---|---|---|---|---|---|---|---|---|---|
| East Tenn. State+ | 7 | – | 1 | – | 3 | 12 | – | 5 | – | 3 |
| Mercer ‡ | 7 | – | 3 | – | 1 | 13 | – | 7 | – | 1 |
| Wofford | 6 | – | 4 | – | 0 | 12 | – | 7 | – | 0 |
| UNC Greensboro | 6 | – | 4 | – | 0 | 11 | – | 7 | – | 2 |
| Furman | 2 | – | 6 | – | 2 | 6 | – | 9 | – | 3 |
| VMI | 0 | – | 10 | – | 0 | 0 | – | 17 | – | 0 |
‡-2016 SoCon Tournament Champion +-Invited to the 2016 NCAA Division I Men's Soccer Championship; As of 18 November 2016; Rankings from NSCAA

2016 Summit League men's soccer standings
| | Conf. | | | | | Overall |
| Team | W | | L | | T | W | | L | | T |
|---|---|---|---|---|---|---|---|---|---|---|
| No. 3 Denver ‡ | 5 | – | 0 | – | 1 | 20 | – | 1 | – | 3 |
| Omaha | 5 | – | 0 | – | 1 | 10 | – | 5 | – | 4 |
| Western Illinois | 3 | – | 3 | – | 0 | 8 | – | 10 | – | 1 |
| Eastern Illinois | 2 | – | 4 | – | 0 | 5 | – | 12 | – | 1 |
| Fort Wayne | 2 | – | 4 | – | 0 | 9 | – | 9 | – | 0 |
| Oral Roberts | 2 | – | 4 | – | 0 | 6 | – | 10 | – | 2 |
| IUPUI | 1 | – | 5 | – | 0 | 2 | – | 15 | – | 1 |
‡-Tournament Champion +-Invited to the 2016 NCAA Division I Men's Soccer Championship; As of 13 December 2016; Rankings from NSCAA

2016 Sun Belt Conference men's soccer standings
| | Conf. | | | | | Overall |
| Team | W | | L | | T | W | | L | | T |
|---|---|---|---|---|---|---|---|---|---|---|
| Coastal Carolina ‡ | 3 | – | 1 | – | 1 | 10 | – | 7 | – | 3 |
| Georgia Southern | 3 | – | 1 | – | 1 | 8 | – | 8 | – | 3 |
| Georgia State | 3 | – | 2 | – | 0 | 15 | – | 7 | – | 0 |
| Hartwick | 2 | – | 2 | – | 1 | 9 | – | 6 | – | 4 |
| Appalachian State | 1 | – | 3 | – | 1 | 5 | – | 9 | – | 4 |
| Howard | 1 | – | 4 | – | 0 | 2 | – | 14 | – | 3 |
‡-Tournament Champion +-Invited to the 2016 NCAA Division I Men's Soccer Championship; As of 21 November 2016; Rankings from NSCAA

2016 West Coast Conference men's soccer standings
| | Conf. | | | | | Overall |
| Team | W | | L | | T | W | | L | | T |
|---|---|---|---|---|---|---|---|---|---|---|
| Portland ‡ | 6 | – | 1 | – | 0 | 12 | – | 5 | – | 2 |
| Pacific + | 4 | – | 1 | – | 2 | 13 | – | 4 | – | 2 |
| Loyola Marymount | 4 | – | 3 | – | 0 | 10 | – | 8 | – | 0 |
| Saint Mary's | 4 | – | 3 | – | 0 | 8 | – | 8 | – | 3 |
| San Francisco | 3 | – | 4 | – | 0 | 7 | – | 9 | – | 0 |
| San Diego | 3 | – | 4 | – | 0 | 6 | – | 9 | – | 3 |
| Gonzaga | 2 | – | 4 | – | 1 | 8 | – | 8 | – | 2 |
| Santa Clara | 0 | – | 6 | – | 1 | 5 | – | 10 | – | 1 |
‡-Conference champion + - Invited to the NCAA Division I Men's Soccer Championship; As of 21 November 2016; Rankings from NSCAA

2016 Western Athletic Conference men's soccer standings
| | Conf. | | | | | Overall |
| Team | W | | L | | T | W | | L | | T |
|---|---|---|---|---|---|---|---|---|---|---|
| Utah Valley | 8 | – | 1 | – | 1 | 15 | – | 4 | – | 1 |
| Seattle | 7 | – | 1 | – | 2 | 11 | – | 6 | – | 2 |
| Air Force | 6 | – | 3 | – | 1 | 14 | – | 7 | – | 1 |
| UNLV ‡ | 5 | – | 4 | – | 1 | 10 | – | 12 | – | 2 |
| Grand Canyon ^{#} | 4 | – | 3 | – | 3 | 7 | – | 10 | – | 3 |
| UTRGV | 4 | – | 4 | – | 2 | 4 | – | 6 | – | 8 |
| Cal St. Bakersfield | 4 | – | 6 | – | 0 | 6 | – | 13 | – | 0 |
| San Jose State | 3 | – | 6 | – | 1 | 4 | – | 13 | – | 2 |
| Incarnate Word ^{#} | 2 | – | 5 | – | 3 | 4 | – | 9 | – | 4 |
| Houston Baptist | 3 | – | 7 | – | 0 | 5 | – | 11 | – | 1 |
| UMKC | 1 | – | 7 | – | 2 | 2 | – | 12 | – | 2 |
‡-Tournament Champion + - Invited to the NCAA Division I Men's Soccer Championship ^{#}-Ineligible (In transition); As of 21 November 2016; Rankings from NSCAA

=== Major upsets ===
In this list, a "major upset" is defined as a game won by a team ranked 10 or more spots lower or an unranked team that defeats a team ranked #15 or higher.

| Date | Winner | Score | Loser |
|---|---|---|---|
| August 26 | St. Louis | 1–0 | @ #5 Wake Forest |
| August 26 | Michigan State | 2–1 | @ #12 SMU |
| August 28 | West Virginia | 1–0 @ Akron | #10 Georgetown |
| September 2 | @ #23 San Diego State | 1–0 | #1 Akron |
| September 2 | Duke | 1–0 | @ #9 UCLA |
| September 2 | Louisville | 2–0 | @ #14 Connecticut |
| September 4 | Villanova | 2–1 | @ #11 Boston College |
| September 9 | #19 Butler | 4–2 @ Akron | #7 UC Santa Barbara |
| September 9 | Loyola Chicago | 2–0 @ NIU | #12 Utah Valley |
| September 13 | East Tennessee State | 1–0 ^{(OT)} | @ #2 North Carolina |
| September 16 | @ Louisville | 1–0 | #1 Notre Dame |
| September 20 | @ UNC Wilmington | 2–0 | #5 Charlotte |
| September 23 | @ Cal Poly | 1–0 | #6 UCLA |
| September 23 | Pacific | 2–0 | @ #11 San Diego State |
| October 4 | @ Albany | 2–1 | #3 Syracuse |
| October 7 | Virginia | 2–1 | @ #4 North Carolina |
| October 8 | @ UAB | 2–1 | #15 Kentucky |
| October 11 | @ Tulsa | 2–1 | #6 Creighton |
| October 14 | @ #21 Virginia | 1–0 | #2 Notre Dame |
| October 18 | @ Northwestern | 2–1 ^{(OT)} | #4 Notre Dame |
| October 18 | North Florida | 3–2 | @ #11 FGCU |
| October 21 | @ Duke | 2–1 ^{(2 OT)} | #4 Notre Dame |
| October 22 | @ Villanova | 1–0 | #10 Creighton |
| October 23 | @ New Hampshire | 2–1 | #14 UMass Lowell |
| October 26 | @ DePaul | 1–0 | #15 Butler |
| October 29 | @ SIUE | 1–0 | #11 Loyola Chicago |
| November 6 | Boston College | 1–0 | @ #2 North Carolina |
| November 10 | Oregon State | 1–0 | @ #14 Washington |
| November 11 | New Mexico | 2–1 @ West Virginia | #5 Charlotte |
| November 11 | @ Missouri State | 2–1 ^{(OT)} | #13 Loyola Chicago |

=== Early season tournaments ===
Several universities hosted early season soccer tournaments.

| Name | Dates | Location | No. teams | Champion |
|---|---|---|---|---|
| Akron Classic | August 26–28 | FirstEnergy Stadium–Cub Cadet Field (Akron, OH) | 4 | Akron (2–0) |
| Carolina Nike Classic | August 26–28 | Fetzer Field (Chapel Hill, NC) | 4 | North Carolina (2–0) |
| Central New York Classic | August 26–28 | SU Soccer Stadium (Syracuse, NY) | 4 | Syracuse (2–0); Colgate (2–0) |
| Fairfield Inn by Marriot JMU Invitational | August 26–28 | University Park (Harrisonburg, VA | 4 | Radford (2–0) |
| Gonzaga Soccer Tournament | August 26–28 | Luger Field (Spokane, WA) | 4 | Gonzaga (1–0–1); San Diego State (1–0–1) |
| Hensor–Zaher Classic | August 26–28 | Lorenz Field (Corvallis, OR) | 4 | Oregon State (1–0–1) |
| John Rennie Nike Invitational | August 26–28 | Koskinen Stadium (Durham, NC) | 4 | Duke (1–0–1); San Diego (1–0–1) |
| Marriott Houston Westchase Invitaitonal | August 26–28 | Sorrels Field (Houston, TX) | 4 | UTRGV (1–0–1) |
| Mike Berticelli Memorial Tournament | August 26–28 | Alumni Stadium (Notre Dame, IN) | 4 | Notre Dame (2–0); Indiana (2–0) |
| Mike Gibbs Memorial Tournament | August 26–28 | Hodges Stadium (Jacksonville, FL) | 4 | North Florida (1–0–1); UNC Greensboro (1–0–1) |
| Nike/Aaron Olitsky Memorial Soccer Classic | August 26–28 | Patriots Point Athletics Complex (Mount Pleasant, SC) | 4 | Furman (1–0–1) |
| Stihl Soccer Classic & VCU Tournament | August 26–28 | ODU Soccer Complex & Sports Backers Stadium (Norfolk, VA) & (Richmond, VA) | 4 | Old Dominion (1–0–1); Stetson (1–0–1) |
| Wolstein Classic | August 26–28 | Jesse Owens Memorial Stadium (Columbus, OH) | 4 | UC Santa Barbara (2–0); Virginia Tech (2–0) |
| Adidas/IU Credit Union Classic | September 2–4 | Bill Armstrong Stadium (Bloomington, IN) | 4 | Notre Dame (2–0) |
| Chicago Classic | September 2–4 | Loyola Soccer Park & Wish Field (Chicago. IL) | 4 | DePaul (2–0); Loyola Chicago (2–0) |
| Elon/High Point Classic | September 2–4 | Vert Stadium & Rudd Field (High Point, NC) & (Elon, NC) | 4 | Elon (2–0) |
| The Grange & Ashwill Memorial Invitational | September 2–4 | UNM Soccer Complex (Albuquerque, NM) | 4 | New Mexico (2–0) |
| The Hotels at Grand Prairie Classic | September 2–4 | Shea Stadium (Peoria, IL)) | 4 | Utah Valley (2–0) |
| Johann Memorial Classic | September 2–4 | Peter Johann Memorial Field (Las Vegas, NV) | 4 | UC Riverside (1–1); Santa Clara (1–1); Cal State Fullerton (1–1); UNLV (1–1) |
| The Courtyard by Marriott; Central San Diego Tournament | September 9–11 | SDSU Sports Deck (San Diego, CA) | 4 | Cal State Fullerton (2–0); San Diego State (2–0) |
| Duquesne Invitational | September 9–11 | Arthur J. Rooney Athletic Field (Pittsburgh, PA) | 4 | Duquesne (2–0) |
| NIU/Adidas Invitational | September 9–11 | NIU Soccer and Track & Field Complex (DeKalb, IL) | 4 | Loyola Chicago (2–0) |
| ProRehab Aces Soccer Classic | September 9–11 | Arad McCutchan Stadium (Evansville, IN) | 4 | Evansville (1–0–1); Portland (1–0–1) |
| R.I. Capital City Classic | September 9–11 | Chapey Field at Anderson Stadium (Providence, RI) | 4 | Brown (2–0); Providence (2–0) |
| The TLC Plumbing and Utility Invitational | September 9–11 | UNM Soccer Complex (Albuquerque, NM) | 4 | New Mexico (2–0) |
| UAB Soccer For A Cure Classic | September 9–11 | BBVA Compass Field (Birmingham, AL) | 4 | Tulsa (1–0–1) |
| UNCW Courtyard by Marriott; Wilmington-Wrightsville Beach Classic | September 9–11 | UNCW Soccer Stadium (Wilmington, NC) | 4 | Marist (2–0); UNC Wilmington (2–0) |
| University of Akron Tournament | September 9–12 | FirstEnergy Stadium–Cub Cadet Field (Akron, OH) | 4 | Akron (2–0); Butler (2–0) |

=== Conference winners and tournaments ===
| Conference | Regular season winner | Conference Player of the Year | Conference Coach of the Year | Conference tournament | Tournament venue (city) | Tournament winner |
|---|---|---|---|---|---|---|
| America East; Conference | UMass Lowell (Note: UMass Lowell is in its final year of transition from Division II and is ineligible for post-season play.) | None named– 4 position awards | Christian Fiegueroa & staff (UML) | 2016 America East Tournament | Campus sites | Albany |
| American Athletic; Conference | South Florida | None named– 4 position awards | George Kiefer & staff (USF) | 2016 American Athletic Tournament | Hosted by season champion | Tulsa |
| Atlantic 10; Conference | Saint Louis | None named– 3 position awards | Mike McGinty, Saint Louis | 216 A-10 Tournament | Alumni Soccer Stadium (Davidson, NC) | Fordham |
| Atlantic Coast; Conference | Atlantic–Wake Forest; Coastal–North Carolina | None named– 3 position awards | Bobby Muuss, Wake Forest | 2016 ACC Tournament | MUSC Health Stadium (Charleston, SC) | Wake Forest |
| Atlantic Sun; Conference | North Florida | Albert Ruiz, Florida Gulf Coast | Adrian Nunez & staff (UNF) | 2016 A-SUN Tournament | Campus sites | Florida Gulf Coast |
| Big East; Conference | Providence | None named– 4 position awards | Craig Stewart & staff (Providence) | 2016 Big East Tournament | Campus sites | Butler |
| Big South; Conference | Radford | None named– 2 position awards | Marc Reeves, Radford | 2016 Big South Tournament | Bryan Park (Greensboro, NC) | Radford |
| Big Ten; Conference | Maryland | None named– 4 position awards | Sasho Cirovski, Maryland | 2016 B1G Tournament | Grand Park (Westfield, Indiana) | Maryland |
| Big West; Conference | N-UC Santa Barbara; S-Cal State Northridge | None named– 4 position awards | Terry Davila, Cal State Northridge | 2016 Big West Tournament | Campus sites | Cal State Northridge |
| Colonial Athletic; Association | Hofstra | Guillermo Delgado, Delaware | Richard Nuttall, Hofstra | 2016 CAA Tournament | Hosted by season champion | Delaware |
| Conference; USA | Charlotte | Brandt Bronico, Charlotte | Kevin Langan, Charlotte | 2016 C-USA Tournament | Veterans Memorial Soccer Complex (Huntington, West Virginia) | New Mexico |
| Horizon; League | Wright State | Peguy Ngatcha, Wright State | Bryan Davis, Wright State | 2016 Horizon League Tournament | Hosted by season champion | UIC |
| Ivy; League | Columbia & Dartmouth (tie) | None named– 2 position awards | Kevin Anderson, Columbia | No tournament | | |
| Metro Atlantic; Athletic; Conference | Quinnipiac | None named– 3 position awards | Eric Da Costa, Quinnipiac | 2016 MAAC Tournament | Campus sites | Rider |
| Mid-American; Conference | Akron | Adam Najem, Akron | Eric Nichols, Bowling Green | 2016 MAC Tournament | Hosted by season champion | Akron |
| Missouri Valley; Conference | Loyola Chicago | Austin Ledbetter, SIUE | Neil Jones & staff, Loyola Chicago | 2016 MVC tournament | Betty & Bobby Allison South Stadium (Springfield, MO) | SIUE |
| Northeast; Conference | St. Francis Brooklyn | Simen Hestnes, LIU Brooklyn | Tom Giovatto, St. Francis Brooklyn | 2016 NEC Tournament | Hosted by season champion | St. Francis Brooklyn |
| Pac-12; Conference | Stanford | Foster Langsdorf, Stanford & Jose Hernandez, UCLA | Jeremy Gunn, Stanford | No tournament | | |
| Patriot; League | American | None named– 4 position awards | Steve Nichols, Loyola Maryland | 2016 Patriot League Tournament | Hosted by season champion | Colgate |
| Southern; Conference | East Tennessee State | Will Bagrou, Jr., Mercer | Bo Oshoniyi, ETSU | 2016 SoCon Tournament | UNCG Soccer Stadium (Greensboro, NC) | Mercer |
| The Summit; League | Denver & Omaha (tie) | None named– 3 position awards | Jamie Franks, Denver | 2016 Summit League Tournament | Hosted by season champion | Denver |
| Sun Belt; Conference | Coastal Carolina & Georgia Southern (tie) | Hannes Burmeister, Georgia State | John Murphy, Georgia Southern | 2016 Sun Belt Tournament | Hosted by season champion | Coastal Carolina |
| West Coast; Conference | Portland | Eddie Sanchez, Portland | Ryan Jorden. Pacific & Nick Carlin-Voigt, Portland | No tournament | | |
| Western Athletic; Conference | Utah Valley | None named– 2 position awards | Greg Maas, Utah Valley | 2016 WAC Tournament | Hosted by season champion | UNLV |

== Statistics ==
=== Individuals ===
GOALS
| Rank | Scorer | School | Games | Goals |
|---|---|---|---|---|
| 1 | Albert Ruiz | FGCU | 20 | 22 |
| 2 | Cameron Harr | Marist | 19 | 17 |
| | Gordon Wild | Maryland | 21 | 17 |
| 4 | Chris Arling | New Hampshire | 19 | 15 |
| | Julian Gressel | Providence | 22 | 15 |
| | Foster Langsdorf | Stanford | 21 | 15 |
| 7 | Russell Cicerone | Buffalo | 19 | 14 |
| | Jon Gallagher | Notre Dame | 21 | 14 |
| | Jorge Gomez Sanchez | Temple | 18 | 14 |
| | Brian Wright | Vermont | 22 | 14 |

Last update on 13 December 2016

GOALS AGAINST AVERAGE
| Rank | Keeper | School | Games | Minutes | GA | GAA |
|---|---|---|---|---|---|---|
| 1 | Dylan Castanheira | Columbia | 10 | 929 | 3 | .291 |
| 2 | James Pyle | North Carolina | 21 | 1998 | 10 | .450 |
| 3 | Mitch Jensen | Utah Valley | 12 | 945 | 5 | .476 |
| 4 | Alec Ferrell | Wake Forest | 15 | 1411 | 8 | .510 |
| 4 | Nick Gardner | Denver | 23 | 2158 | 13 | .542 |
| 6 | Hendrik Hilpert | Syracuse | 20 | 1905 | 12 | .567 |
| 7 | Andrew Chekadanov | Loyola Chicago | 19 | 1726 | 11 | .574 |
| 8 | Andrew Epstein | Stanfrord | 22 | 2096 | 14 | .601 |
| 9 | Thor Arne Hofs | George Washington | 17 | 1644 | 12 | .611 |
| 10 | Aitor Pouseu Blanco | Radford | 19 | 1766 | 13 | .633 |

Last update on 13 December 2016

ASSISTS
| Rank | Player | School | Games | Assists |
|---|---|---|---|---|
| 1 | Dan Campos | Longwood | 21 | 12 |
| | Jonathan Lewis | Akron | 22 | 12 |
| | Cameron Woodfin | ETSU | 19 | 12 |
| | Brian Wright | Vermont | 22 | 12 |
| 5 | Tim Kübel | Louisville | 21 | 11 |
| | Christopher Mueller | Wisconsin | 19 | 11 |
| | Arion Sobers-Assue | FGCU | 20 | 11 |
| | Jackson Yueill | UCLA | 20 | 11 |
| 8 | Zac Blaydes | Evansville | 21 | 10 |
| | Brody Kraussel | Loyola Chicago | 19 | 10 |
| | Charlie Reymann | Kentucky | 19 | 10 |
| | Adam Wilson | Cincinnati | 17 | 10 |

Last update on 13 December 2016

SAVE PERCENTAGE
| Rank | Keeper | School | Games | Saves | GA | Save % |
|---|---|---|---|---|---|---|
| 1 | Dylan Castanheira | Columbia | 10 | 28 | 3 | .903 |
| 2 | Alec Ferrell | Wake Forest | 15 | 53 | 8 | .869 |
| 3 | Thor Arne Hofs | George Washington | 17 | 68 | 11 | .861 |
| 4 | Adam Allmaras | San Diego St. | 19 | 77 | 13 | .856 |
| 5 | Colin Miller | Providence | 15 | 62 | 11 | .849 |
| 6 | Sebastian Kalk | Cleveland State | 12 | 56 | 10 | .848 |
| 7 | Eric Klenofsky | Monmouth | 11 | 53 | 10 | .841 |
| 8 | Andrew Withers | St. John's | 17 | 63 | 12 | .840 |
| 9 | Kyle Dal Santo | SIUE | 22 | 88 | 17 | .838 |
| 10 | Mitch Jensen | Utah Valley | 12 | 25 | 5 | .833 |

Last update on 13 December 2016

TOTAL POINTS
| Rank | Player | School | Games | Goals | Assists | Points |
|---|---|---|---|---|---|---|
| 1 | Albert Ruiz | FGCU | 20 | 22 | 5 | 49 |
| 2 | Brian Wright | Vermont | 22 | 14 | 12 | 40 |
| 3 | Gordon Wild | Maryland | 21 | 17 | 5 | 39 |
| 4 | Russell Cicerone | Buffalo | 19 | 14 | 9 | 37 |
| 5 | Julian Gressel | Providence | 22 | 15 | 6 | 36 |
| 6 | Jon Gallagher | Notre Dame | 21 | 14 | 7 | 35 |
| | Cameron Harr | Marist | 19 | 17 | 1 | 35 |
| 8 | Arion Sobers-Assue | FGCU | 20 | 11 | 11 | 33 |
| 9 | Guillermo Delgado | Delaware | 19 | 12 | 8 | 32 |
| 10 | Chris Arling | New Hampshire | 19 | 15 | 1 | 31 |
| | Jorge Gomez Sanchez | Temple | 18 | 14 | 3 | 31 |

Last update on 13 December 2016

TOTAL SAVES
| Rank | Keeper | School | Games | Saves |
|---|---|---|---|---|
| 1 | Mertcan Akar | Belmont | 18 | 109 |
| 2 | Kenneth Hersey | Howard | 18 | 105 |
| 3 | David Greczek | Rutgers | 17 | 101 |
| 4 | Chris Katt | UNC Asheville | 18 | 100 |
| 5 | Kevin Marquez | CSUN | 21 | 99 |
| 6 | Robert Allen | VMI | 14 | 98 |
| 7 | Vincent Morales | UC Riverside | 20 | 96 |
| 8 | Paul Ladwig | Stetson | 16 | 91 |
| 9 | Winter Fondi | Robert Morris | 16 | 90 |
| | Will Steiner | Villanova | 21 | 90 |

Last update on 13 December 2016

- NOTE: Niki Jackson of Grand Canyon was among the
  national leaders in both Goals (16) and Total Points (34),
  but his school was in its final year of transition from
  Division II to Division I, making the school and its athletes
  ineligible for consideration for statistical placement.
- Individual statistics are through the games of 11 December 2016.

=== Teams ===
SCORING OFFENSE
| Rank | School | Games | Goals | Goals/Game |
|---|---|---|---|---|
| 1 | FGCU | 21 | 62 | 2.952 |
| 2 | Maryland | 21 | 53 | 2.524 |
| 3 | LIU Brooklyn | 18 | 39 | 2.167 |
| 4 | High Point | 19 | 41 | 2.158 |
| 5 | Charlotte | 18 | 37 | 2.056 |
| 6 | Akron | 22 | 45 | 2.045 |
| | Air Force | 22 | 45 | 2.045 |
| 8 | William & Mary | 21 | 41 | 1.952 |
| 9 | UNC Greensboro | 20 | 39 | 1.950 |
| 10 | North Florida | 15 | 29 | 1.933 |

Last update on 13 December 2016

SCORING DEFENSE (Team Goals Against Average)
| Rank | School | Games | Minutes | GA | Team GAA |
|---|---|---|---|---|---|
| 1 | North Carolina | 21 | 2016 | 10 | .446 |
| 2 | Wake Forest | 25 | 2345 | 12 | .461 |
| 3 | Denver | 24 | 2268 | 13 | .516 |
| 4 | Stanford | 24 | 2241 | 14 | .562 |
| 5 | Syracuse | 20 | 1905 | 12 | .567 |
| 6 | Loyola Chicago | 19 | 1745 | 11 | .567 |
| 7 | St. Francis Brooklyn | 20 | 1952 | 13 | .596 |
| 8 | George Washington | 18 | 1734 | 12 | .623 |
| 9 | Radford | 20 | 1856 | 13 | .630 |
| 10 | San Diego St. | 19 | 1845 | 13 | .634 |

Last update on 13 December 2016

SHUTOUT PERCENTAGE
| Rank | School | Games | Shutouts | Shutout % |
|---|---|---|---|---|
| 1 | North Carolina | 21 | 14 | .667 |
| 2 | Loyola Chicago | 19 | 12 | .632 |
| 3 | Denver | 24 | 14 | .583 |
| 4 | San Diego State | 19 | 11 | .579 |
| 5 | Charlotte | 18 | 10 | .556 |
| 6 | St. Francis Brooklyn | 20 | 11 | .550 |
| | Syracuse | 20 | 11 | .550 |
| 8 | Stanford | 22 | 12 | .545 |
| 9 | Wake Forest | 24 | 13 | .542 |
| 10 | Columbia | 17 | 9 | .529 |

Last update on 13 December 2016

- Team statistics are through the games of 11 December 2016.

WON-LOST-TIED PERCENTAGE
| Rank | School | Wins | Loses | Ties | W-L-T % |
|---|---|---|---|---|---|
| 1 | Maryland | 18 | 1 | 2 | ,905 |
| 2 | Denver | 20 | 1 | 3 | .896 |
| 3 | Wake Forest | 19 | 2 | 4 | .840 |
| 4 | Columbia | 13 | 3 | 1 | .794 |
| 5 | Utah Valley | 15 | 4 | 1 | 775 |
| 6 | Loyola Chicago | 14 | 4 | 1 | .763 |
| 7 | North Carolina | 14 | 3 | 4 | ,762 |
| 8 | Radford | 14 | 4 | 2 | .750 |
| 9 | Stanford | 14 | 3 | 6 | ,739 |
| 10 | FGCU | 14 | 4 | 3 | ,738 |
| | Indiana | 12 | 2 | 7 | ,738 |

- NOTE: UMass Lowell finished its season 13–1–2 (.875)
  but was in its final year of transition from Division II to
  Division I, making the school ineligible for consideration
  for both statistical placement and postseason play.

Last update on 13 December 2016

== See also ==
- College soccer
- List of NCAA Division I men's soccer programs
- 2016 in American soccer
- 2016 NCAA Division I Men's Soccer Championship
- 2016 NCAA Division I women's soccer season
