= 2016 Tulsa Golden Hurricane men's soccer team =

American college soccer season

2016 Tulsa Golden Hurricane men's soccer

AAC tournament champions

NCAA tournament, first round
- Conference: American Athletic Conference
- Record: 10–5–5 (4–2–1 The American)
- Head coach: Tom McIntosh (22nd season)
- Assistant coaches: Justin Cook (10th season); Ryan Pore (4th season); Daniel Cherbonnier (4th season)
- Home stadium: Hurricane Soccer & Track Stadium

2016 American Athletic Conference men's soccer standings
	Conf.					Overall
Team	W		L		T	W		L		T
South Florida +	6	–	1	–	0	10	–	6	–	4
Tulsa ‡	4	–	2	–	1	10	–	5	–	5
Connecticut	3	–	3	–	1	11	–	7	–	1
Cincinnati	3	–	4	–	0	9	–	7	–	1
UCF	3	–	4	–	0	5	–	11	–	0
Temple	2	–	3	–	2	10	–	6	–	2
Memphis	2	–	4	–	1	8	–	8	–	1
SMU	2	–	4	–	1	6	–	9	–	1
‡ – Tournament champion + – Invited to the NCAA Division I Men's Soccer Championship; As of 13 December 2016; Rankings from NSCAA

The 2016 Tulsa Golden Hurricane men's soccer team represented the University of Tulsa during the 2016 NCAA Division I men's soccer season. It was the program's 37th season.

== Before the season ==
=== Transfers out / departures ===
Adrian Smart transferred to Bloomfield College. Jordan Speed transferred to Midwestern State. Geoffrey Dee transferred to Louisville. Aymar Sigue transferred to Penn State. Zach Jackson transferred to Furman. Tony Doellefeld transferred to Belmont. Kyle Daledovich transferred to South Dakota Mines.

== Roster ==
Note: Flags indicate national team as defined under FIFA eligibility rules; some limited exceptions apply. Players may hold more than one non-FIFA nationality.

No.	Pos.	Nation	Player
0	GK	USA	Marcel Da Silva
1	GK	USA	Jake McGuire
2	DF	CAN	Quinton Duncan
3	FW	USA	Bernie Zuazua
4	DF	NOR	Casper Venstad
5	DF	USA	Ryan Alpers
6	DF	USA	Cole Poppen
7	FW	USA	Matthew Puig
8	MF	USA	David Viox
9	FW	USA	Miguel Velasquez
10	FW	USA	Juan Sanchez
11	MF	USA	Alejandro Chavez
12	DF	GER	Koray Easterling
13	MF	USA	Cameron Drackett
14	MF	ZIM	Munashe Raranje

No.	Pos.	Nation	Player
15	MF	USA	Rollie Rocha
16	MF	NED	Kay Duit
17	MF	USA	Vincent Pedace
18	DF	USA	Garrett Garwood
20	DF	USA	Aidan Dunne
21	DF	USA	Kurt Gerteisen
22	MF	CMR	Lesley Nchanji
23	DF	USA	Zack Stavrou
24	MF	USA	Jacob Gooden
25	MF	USA	Ray Saari
28	MF	USA	Fred Mattioli
30	GK	USA	Matt Karasinski
31	MF	NED	Lucas Bueno

== Schedule ==
=== Exhibition ===
August 14, 2016	Tulsa	2–6	#4 Maryland	Tulsa, Oklahoma
11:00 a.m.	Stavrou 2'; Saari 51' (pen.)	Report	Elney 40'; Wild 61' (pen.), 101'; Calix 78'; Heitzmann 98'; Reeves 105'	Stadium: Hurricane Stadium

August 19, 2016	Tulsa	0–0	Oklahoma Wesleyan	Tulsa, Oklahoma
7:00 p.m.		Report		Stadium: Hurricane Stadium

August 20, 2016	Tulsa	3–2	Central Arkansas	Tulsa, Oklahoma
7:00 p.m.	Nchanji 17'; Puig 20'; Stavrou 25'	Report	Brodacki 55'; Carson 76'	Stadium: Hurricane Stadium

=== Regular season ===
August 26, 2016	Cal State Northridge	2–1	Tulsa	Northridge, California
9:30 p.m.	Diouf 1'; N. Grinde 83'	Report	Sanchez 60'	Stadium: Matador Soccer Field; Attendance: 1,011

August 31, 2016	Tulsa	3–0	UMKC	Tulsa, Oklahoma
7:00 p.m.	Gooden 26'; Puig 78'; Saari 87' (pen.)	Report		Stadium: Hurricane Stadium; Attendance: 231

September 4, 2016	Saint Louis	1–1 (a.e.t.)	Tulsa	St. Louis, Missouri
7:00 p.m.	Owens 59'	Report	Gooden 20'	Stadium: Hermann Stadium; Attendance: 1,176

September 9, 2016	UAB	0–1	Tulsa	Birmingham, Alabama
7:00 p.m.		Report	Saari 74'	Stadium: West Campus Field; Attendance: 362

September 11, 2016	Stetson	2–2 (a.e.t.)	Tulsa	Birmingham, Alabama
11:30 a.m.	Contreras 13'; Diniz 25'	Report	Venstad 51'; Gooden 67'	Stadium: West Campus Field; Attendance: 98

September 16, 2016	Tulsa	1–2	#16 Akron	Tulsa, Oklahoma
8:00 p.m.	Saari 85' (pen.)	Report	Wiedt 65'; Kahsay 88'	Stadium: Hurricane Stadium; Attendance: 626

September 19, 2016	Tulsa	2–1 (a.e.t.)	Santa Clara	Tulsa, Oklahoma
7:00 p.m.	Rocha 13'; Puig 96'	Report	Jarrett 36'	Stadium: Hurricane Stadium; Attendance: 123

September 24, 2016 Rivalry	SMU	0–3	Tulsa	Dallas, Texas
7:00 p.m.		Report	Saari 4'; Rocha 27'; Duit 38'	Stadium: Westcott Field; Attendance: 1,005

September 27, 2016	Tulsa	1–0	Missouri State	Tulsa, Oklahoma
7:00 p.m.	Stavrou 66' (pen.)	Report		Stadium: Hurricane Stadium; Attendance: 174

October 1, 2016	Tulsa	0–1	Connecticut	Tulsa, Oklahoma
7:00 p.m.		Report	Geres 31'	Stadium: Hurricane Stadium; Attendance: 291

October 6, 2016	South Florida	2–0	Tulsa	Tampa, Florida
6:00 p.m.	Bartman 11'; Becket 38'	Report		Stadium: Corbett Stadium; Attendance: 349

October 11, 2016	Tulsa	2–1	#6 Creighton	Tulsa, Oklahoma
7:00 p.m.	Chavez 86'; Puig 89'	Report	Lopez-Espin 25'	Stadium: Hurricane Stadium; Attendance: 323

October 15, 2016	Tulsa	3–2	UCF	Tulsa, Oklahoma
7:00 p.m.	Bueno 68'; Puig 81'; Rocha 88'	Report	Pyysalo 61'; Clavijo 87'	Stadium: Hurricane Stadium; Attendance: 325

October 18, 2016	Tulsa	3–3 (a.e.t.)	Oral Roberts	Tulsa, Oklahoma
7:00 p.m.	Raranje 22'; Easterling 81'; Puig 87' (pen.)	Report	Rogers 63'; Fraley 79'; Riveros 86'	Stadium: Hurricane Stadium; Attendance: 318

October 22, 2016	Temple	1–1 (a.e.t.)	Tulsa	Philadelphia, Pennsylvania
6:00 p.m.	Wix Rauch 87'	Report	Duit 6'	Stadium: Ambler Soccer Field; Attendance: 522

October 29, 2016	Cincinnati	1–3	Tulsa	Cincinnati, Ohio
6:00 p.m.	Wilson 19' (pen.)	Report	Saari 48' (pen.); Puig 65'; Duncan 88'	Stadium: Sheakley Athletics Center; Attendance: 664

November 4, 2016	Tulsa	2–0	Memphis	Tulsa, Oklahoma
7:00 p.m.	Gooden 73'; Puig 86' (pen.)	Report		Stadium: Hurricane Stadium; Attendance: 454

=== AAC tournament ===
November 11, 2016 Semifinals	Tulsa	2–0	Connecticut	Tampa, Florida
3:30 p.m.	Sanchez 11'; Puig 62'	Report		Stadium: Corbett Stadium

November 13, 2016 Championship	Tulsa	1–1 (a.e.t.) (4–2 p)	South Florida	Tampa, Florida
11:00 a.m.	Sanchez 72'	Report	Bartman 52'	Stadium: Corbett Stadium
	Penalties
	Duncan (penalty scored); Puig (penalty scored); Raranje (penalty missed); Stavrou (penalty scored); Saari (penalty scored)		(penalty missed) Smith; (penalty scored) Gomez; (penalty scored) Rodriguez; (penalty missed) Epps

=== NCAA tournament ===
November 17, 2016 First Round	#23 Creighton	3–0	Tulsa	Omaha, Nebraska
6:00 p.m.	LaGro 3'; Englis 6'; Lopez-Espin 68'	Report		Stadium: Morrison Stadium; Attendance: 1,404; Referee: Sorin Stoica

== Rankings ==
Week
	Pre	1	2	3	4	5	6	7	8	9	10	11	12	Final
NSCAA	RV	NR	NR	NR	NR	NR	NR	NR	NR	NR	NR	NR	RV	NR
