= 2016 American Athletic Conference men's soccer season =

- League: NCAA Division I
- Sport: Soccer
- Duration: August, 2016 – November, 2016
- Teams: 7

2017 MLS SuperDraft
- Top draft pick: Jake Nerwinski, Connecticut
- Picked by: Vancouver Whitecaps FC, 7th overall

Regular Season
- Season champions: South Florida
- Runners-up: Tulsa

Tournament
- Champions: Tulsa
- Runners-up: South Florida
- Finals MVP: Juan Sanchez

AAC men's soccer seasons
- ← 2015 2017 →

2016 American Athletic Conference men's soccer standings
	Conf.					Overall
Team	W		L		T	W		L		T
South Florida +	6	–	1	–	0	10	–	6	–	4
Tulsa ‡	4	–	2	–	1	10	–	5	–	5
Connecticut	3	–	3	–	1	11	–	7	–	1
Cincinnati	3	–	4	–	0	9	–	7	–	1
UCF	3	–	4	–	0	5	–	11	–	0
Temple	2	–	3	–	2	10	–	6	–	2
Memphis	2	–	4	–	1	8	–	8	–	1
SMU	2	–	4	–	1	6	–	9	–	1
‡ – Tournament champion + – Invited to the NCAA Division I Men's Soccer Championship; As of 13 December 2016; Rankings from NSCAA

The 2016 American Athletic Conference men's soccer season was the 4th season of men's varsity soccer in the conference.

The SMU Mustangs are the defending regular season champions, and the Tulsa Golden Hurricane are the defending tournament champions.

== Changes from 2015 ==
- None

== Teams ==
=== Stadia and locations ===
Team	Location	Stadium	Capacity
Cincinnati Bearcats	Cincinnati, Ohio	Gettler Stadium	7,500
Connecticut Huskies	Storrs, Connecticut	Morrone Stadium	5,100
Memphis Tigers	Memphis, Tennessee	Mike Rose Soccer Complex	2,500
South Florida Bulls	Tampa, Florida	Corbett Soccer Stadium	4,000
SMU Mustangs	University Park, Texas	Westcott Field	4,000
Tulsa Golden Hurricane	Tulsa, Oklahoma	Hurricane Soccer & Track Stadium	2,000
Temple Owls	Philadelphia, Pennsylvania	Ambler Field	300
UCF Knights	Orlando, Florida	UCF Soccer and Track Stadium	2,000

- East Carolina, Houston and Tulane do not sponsor men's soccer

== Regular season ==
=== Results ===
Team/Opponent	CIN	CON	MEM	USF	SMU	TUL	TEM	UCF
Cincinnati Bearcats			2–1					
Connecticut Huskies							1–0	
Memphis Tigers	1–2							
South Florida Bulls								2–1
SMU Mustangs						0–3		
Tulsa Golden Hurricane					3–0			
Temple Owls		0–1						
UCF Knights				1–2				

=== Rankings ===
Legend
Increase in ranking
Decrease in ranking
Not ranked previous week

		Pre	Wk 1	Wk 2	Wk 3	Wk 4	Wk 5	Wk 6	Wk 7	Wk 8	Wk 9	Wk 10	Wk 11	Wk 12	Final
Cincinnati	C														
Connecticut	C	RV	14	RV	RV	NR		RV	24	RV	RV	NR			
Memphis	C														
SMU	C	12	25	RV	NR										
USF	C	19	RV	RV			RV	NR				RV	RV	RV	NR
Temple	C			RV	NR										
Tulsa	C	RV	NR											RV	NR
UCF	C														

== Postseason ==
=== AAC tournament ===
Semifinals
1	South Florida	2**
4	UCF	1
2	Tulsa	2
3	Connecticut	0

Finals
1	South Florida	1 (2)
2	Tulsa (pen.)	1 (4)**

Note: * denotes overtime period(s).

=== NCAA tournament ===
Seed	Region	School	1st Round	2nd Round	3rd Round	Quarterfinals	Semifinals	Championship
—N/a	College Park	Tulsa	L, 0–3 vs. Creighton – (Omaha)					
—N/a	College Park	South Florida	T, 2–2 (L, 0–3 pen.) vs. Florida Gulf Coast – (Tampa)					

== All-AAC awards and teams ==
2016 AAC Men's Soccer Individual Awards
Award	Recipient(s)
Offensive Player of the Year	Matias Pyysalo, UCF
Midfielder of the Year	Adam Wilson, Cincinnati
Defensive Player of the Year	Prosper Figbe, USF
Goalkeeper of the Year	Spasoje Stefanovic, USF
Rookie of the Year	Garrett McLaughlin, SMU
Coaching Staff of the Year	South Florida
Fair Play Award	Connecticut

2016 AAC Men's Soccer All-Conference Teams
First Team	Second Team	Rookie Team
Matias Pyysalo, M Jr., UCF; Adam Wilson, M, So., Cincinnati; Kwame Awuah, M Sr., UConn; Abdou Mbacke Thiam, F, So., UConn; Jake Nerwinski, B Sr., UConn; Nazeem Bartman, F Sr., USF; Prosper Figbe, B, So., USF; Lindo Mfeka, M Sr., USF; Spasoje Stefanovic, GK Sr., USF; Jorge Gomez Sanchez, F Sr., Temple; Carlos Moros Gracia, B Sr., Temple	Patrick Nielsen, B, Fr., Cincinnati; Simen Olafsen, B, So., UConn; Raul Gonzalez, M Sr., Memphis; Joonas Jokinen, F Jr., Temple; Melvin Becket, F Sr., USF; Jordan Cano, B Jr., SMU; Mauro Cichero, M Jr., SMU; Jake McGuire, GK Sr., Tulsa; Matt Puig, F, Fr., Tulsa; Ray Saari, M Sr., Tulsa; Zack Stavrou, B Jr., Tulsa	Brian Jamba, M, UCF; Ryan Melink, M, Cincinnati; Patrick Nielsen, B, Cincinnati; David Sanz, M, Cincinnati; Niko Petridis, M, UConn; Munir Saleh, M, UConn; Jackson Morse, M, Memphis; Garrett McLaughlin, F, SMU; Albert Moreno, M, Temple; Alejandro Chavez, B, Tulsa; Matt Puig, F, Tulsa

== MLS SuperDraft ==
=== Total picks by school ===
Team	Round 1	Round 2	Round 3	Round 4	Total
Cincinnati	0	0	0	0	0
Connecticut	2	0	0	0	2
Memphis	0	0	0	0	0
SMU	0	0	0	0	0
South Florida	0	2	0	1	3
Temple	0	0	1	0	1
Tulsa	0	1	0	0	1
UCF	0	0	0	0	0

=== List of selections ===
Round	Pick #	MLS team	Player	Position	College
1	7	Vancouver Whitecaps FC	(United States) Jake Nerwinski	DF	UConn
1	16	New York City FC	(Canada) Kwame Awuah	MF	UConn
2	25	Philadelphia Union	(United States) Marcus Epps	MF	South Florida
2	28	San Jose Earthquakes	(South Africa) Lindo Mfeka	MF	South Florida
2	30	Houston Dynamo FC	(United States) Jake McGuire	GK	Tulsa
3	51	Vancouver Whitecaps FC	(Spain) Jorge Gómez	MF	Temple
4	73	Vancouver Whitecaps FC	(South Africa) Nazeem Bartman	FW	South Florida

== See also ==
- 2016 NCAA Division I men's soccer season
- 2016 American Athletic Conference Men's Soccer Tournament
- 2016 American Athletic Conference women's soccer season
