= 2017 ASUN Conference men's soccer season =

- League: NCAA Division I
- Sport: Soccer
- Duration: August 25, 2017 – November 12, 2017
- Teams: 8

2018 MLS SuperDraft
- Top draft pick: Nicolas Samayoa, FGCU
- Picked by: New England Revolution, 78th overall

Regular Season
- Season champions: Stetson
- Runners-up: Florida Gulf Coast
- Season MVP: Mamadou Guirassy
- Top scorer: Mamadou Guirassy (16)

Tournament
- Champions: Lipscomb
- Runners-up: Jacksonville
- Finals MVP: Ivan Sakou

ASUN Conference men's soccer seasons
- ← 2016 2018 →

2017 ASUN Conference men's soccer standings
	Conf.					Overall
Team	W		L		T	W		L		T
Stetson	4	–	0	–	2	7	–	7	–	2
Florida Gulf Coast	4	–	1	–	1	8	–	6	–	3
NJIT	3	–	2	–	1	8	–	7	–	4
North Florida	2	–	3	–	1	3	–	10	–	2
Jacksonville	2	–	3	–	1	6	–	10	–	1
Lipscomb ‡	2	–	4	–	0	11	–	8	–	2
USC Upstate	1	–	5	–	0	3	–	10	–	2
‡ – 2017 ASUN tournament champion + – Invited to the 2017 NCAA Division I Men's Soccer Championship; As of November 17, 2017; Rankings from United Soccer Coaches

The 2017 ASUN Conference men's soccer season was the 40th season of men's varsity soccer in the conference. The regular season began on August 25, 2017 and ended on October 28, 2017. The regular season culminated with the 2017 ASUN Men's Soccer Tournament, which was held from November 3–11, 2017. The tournament determined the conference's tournament champion, and automatic berth into the 2017 NCAA Division I Men's Soccer Tournament.

Newly appointed head coach, Kyle Gookins lead the Stetson Hatters to their first Atlantic Sun regular season championship, accumulating a 4-0-2 record. The Hatters edged out traditional ASUN power Florida Gulf Coast for the title. In the tournament, Lipscomb earned their first ASUN championship, and thus, their first berth into the NCAA Tournament. There, they lost in the first round to Butler.

== Background ==
Ahead of the 2017 season, there were two head coaching changes. Jesse Cormier, formerly Vermont's head coach, took the head coaching role at Florida Gulf Coast. This came following Bob Butehorn's departure from FGCU, to coach South Florida. Kyle Gookins, formerly an assistant coach for Charlotte, took the head coaching position at Stetson. This was following Jared Vock stepping down as the caretaker manager for Stetson.

=== Head coaches ===
Team	Head coach	Previous job	Years at school	Overall record	Record at school	A-Sun record	NCAA Tournaments	NCAA College Cups	NCAA Titles
Florida Gulf Coast	Jesse Cormier	Vermont	1	122–95–50 (.551)	8–6–3 (.559)	4–1–1 (.750)	3	0	0
Jacksonville	Mauricio Ruiz	UCF (asst.)	4	21–42–2 (.338)	21–42–2 (.338)	6–16–1 (.283)	0	0	0
Lipscomb	Charles Morrow	Belmont Abbey	14	110–128–28 (.466)	90–115–22 (.445)	30–28–7 (.515)	1	0	0
NJIT	Fernando Barboto	Iona	2	16–13–8 (.541)	16–13–8 (.541)	6–4–2 (.583)	0	0	0
North Florida	Derek Marinatos	Furman (asst.)	7	32–49–5 (.401)	32–49–5 (.401)	36–54–8 (.408)	1	0	0
Stetson	Kyle Gookins	Charlotte (asst.)	1	7–7–2 (.500)	7–7–2 (.500)	4–0–2 (.833)	0	0	0
USC Upstate	Scott Halkett	USC Upstate (asst.)	1	3–10–2 (.267)	3–10–2 (.267)	1–5–0 (.167)	0	0	0

== Preseason ==
=== Recruiting ===
National Rankings
Team	CSN	TDS
Florida Gulf Coast	NR	NR
Jacksonville	NR	NR
Lipscomb	NR	NR
NJIT	NR	NR
North Florida	NR	NR
Stetson	NR	NR
USC Upstate	NR	NR

=== Preseason poll ===
The preseason poll had Florida Gulf Coast winning the regular season, just ahead of North Florida and Lipscomb.

	Team ranking	First place votes	Raw points
1.	Florida Gulf Coast	(5)	43
2.	North Florida	0	36
3.	Lipscomb	0	35
4.	Jacksonville	2	34
5.	NJIT	0	22
6.	Stetson	0	18
7.	USC Upsate	0	8

== Regular season ==
=== Results ===
Team/Opponent	FGC	JAX	LIP	NJT	UNF	STE	USC
Florida Gulf Coast		1–0	2–0	5–0			
Jacksonville					1–2	0–0	3–1
Lipscomb		1–3		0–1	1–0		
NJIT		4–1			1–1		2–1
North Florida	1–2					0–1	2–1
Stetson	1–1		2–1	2–1			
USC Upstate	2–1		0–4			0–2	

=== Rankings ===
==== United Soccer Coaches National ====
Legend
Increase in ranking
Decrease in ranking
Not ranked previous week

		Pre	Wk 1	Wk 2	Wk 3	Wk 4	Wk 5	Wk 6	Wk 7	Wk 8	Wk 9	Wk 10	Wk 11	Wk 12	Final
Florida Gulf Coast	C	23	NR												
Jacksonville	C														
Lipscomb	C														
NJIT	C														
North Florida	C														
Stetson	C														
USC Upstate	C														

== Postseason ==
=== A-Sun Tournament ===
First round November 3
4	North Florida	1
5	Jacksonville	2
3	NJIT	3 (3)
6	Lipscomb	3 (3)

Semifinals; November 5
1	Stetson	1
5	Jacksonville (2OT)	2
2	Florida Gulf Coast	1
6	Lipscomb	2

Final; November 11
5	Jacksonville	1
6	Lipscomb	2

=== NCAA Tournament ===
Seed	Region	School	1st Round	2nd Round	3rd Round	Quarterfinals	Semifinals	Championship
—N/a	Winston-Salem	Lipscomb	L, 0–2 vs. Butler – (Indianapolis)					

== Awards ==
=== Postseason awards ===
==== All-ASun awards and teams ====
2017 ASUN Men's Soccer Individual Awards
Award	Recipient(s)
ASUN Player of the Year	Mamadou Guirassy, NJIT
ASUN Defensive Player of the Year	Nicolas Samayoa, FGCU
ASUN Coach of the Year	Kyle Gookins, Stetson
ASUN Goalkeeper of the Year	Joseph Melong, Stetson
ASUN Freshman of the Year	Deniz Dogan, Stetson

ASUN First Team

Player	Nat.	School	Position	Class	Hometown (High school/Previous college/Previous club)
Joseph Melong	CAN	Stetson	GK	Jr.	Winnipeg, Manitoba (Temple University)
Nicolas Samayoa	GUA	Florida Gulf Coast	DF	Sr.	Guatemala City, Guatemala (Valle Verde High School)
Joe Kerridge	USA	Lipscomb	DF	Sr.	Golden, Colorado (Golden High School)
Ian McCauley	USA	Stetson	DF	Jr.	Seffner, Florida (IMG Academy)
Ivan Alvarado	USA	Lipscomb	MF	Sr.	Fort Worth, Texas (Southwest High School)
Adrian Núñez	CRC	North Florida	MF	So.	San José, Costa Rica (Saprissa U20)
Deniz Dogan	GER	Stetson	MF	Fr.	Aachen, Germany (Fortuna Düsseldorf U19)
Mamadou Guirassy	FRA	NJIT	FW	Sr.	Paris, France (Issy U17)
Shak Adams	USA	Florida Gulf Coast	FW	So.	Antioch, Tennessee (Tennessee SC U18)
Albert Ruiz	CAT	Florida Gulf Coast	FW	Sr.	Barcelona, Catalonia (Cornellà U19)
Logan Paynter	USA	Lipscomb	FW	Jr.	Bradenton, Florida (Manatee High School)

ASUN Second-Team

Player	Nat.	School	Position	Class	Hometown (High school/Previous college/Previous club)
Juanes Fajardo	USA	North Florida	GK	Sr.	Winter Garden, Florida
Preston Kilwien	USA	Florida Gulf Coast	DF	Jr.	San Francisco, California
Phillip Costa	USA	NJIT	DF	Jr.	Kenilworth, New Jersey
Micah Smoak	USA	North Florida	DF	Sr.	Melbourne, Florida
Kai Bennett	USA	Jacksonville	MF	So.	Smyrna, Georgia
Robert Ferrer	ESP	Florida Gulf Coast	MF	Sr.	Barcelona, Spain
Dennis Zapata	USA	Florida Gulf Coast	MF	Jr.	Orlando, Florida
Danny Cordeiro	USA	NJIT	MF	Sr.	North Arlington, New Jersey
Dylan Sacramento	CAN	Florida Gulf Coast	FW	Sr.	Winnipeg, Manitoba
Josh Castellanos	USA	North Florida	FW	Sr.	Ponte Vedra, Florida
Ivan Sakou	CMR	Lipscomb	FW	Sr.	Yaoundé, Cameroon

==== All-Americans ====
No players from the ASUN Conference earned All-American honors.

== MLS SuperDraft ==
=== Total picks by school ===
Team	Round 1	Round 2	Round 3	Round 4	Total
Florida Gulf Coast	0	0	0	1	1
Jacksonville	0	0	0	0	0
Lipscomb	0	0	0	0	0
NJIT	0	0	0	1	1
North Florida	0	0	0	0	0
Stetson	0	0	0	0	0
USC Upstate	0	0	0	0	0

=== List of selections ===
Round	Pick #	MLS team	Player	Position	College	Ref.
4	78	New England Revolution	(Guatemala) Nicolas Samayoa	DF	Florida Gulf Coast	
4	87	Portland Timbers	(France) Mamadou Guirassy	FW	NJIT	

=== Homegrown contracts ===
No ASUN players signed homegrown contracts with their parent MLS club.

== See also ==
- 2017 NCAA Division I men's soccer season
- 2017 Atlantic Sun Conference women's soccer season
