= Ibišević =

Ibišević is a Bosnian surname. Notable people with the surname include:

- Elvir Ibišević (born 1998), Bosnian footballer
- Vedad Ibišević (born 1984), Bosnian footballer
