= 2016 American Athletic Conference men's soccer tournament =

- Tournament Logo
- Classification: Division I
- Teams: 4
- Matches: 3
- Site: Corbett Stadium; Tampa, Florida
- Champions: Tulsa (8th title)
- Winning coach: Tom McIntosh (7th title)
- Broadcast: American Digital Network ESPN2, ESPNU

2016 American Athletic Conference men's soccer standings
	Conf.					Overall
Team	W		L		T	W		L		T
South Florida +	6	–	1	–	0	10	–	6	–	4
Tulsa ‡	4	–	2	–	1	10	–	5	–	5
Connecticut	3	–	3	–	1	11	–	7	–	1
Cincinnati	3	–	4	–	0	9	–	7	–	1
UCF	3	–	4	–	0	5	–	11	–	0
Temple	2	–	3	–	2	10	–	6	–	2
Memphis	2	–	4	–	1	8	–	8	–	1
SMU	2	–	4	–	1	6	–	9	–	1
‡ – Tournament champion + – Invited to the NCAA Division I Men's Soccer Championship; As of 13 December 2016; Rankings from NSCAA

The 2016 American Athletic Conference men's soccer tournament is the 4th edition of the American Athletic Conference Men's Soccer Tournament. The tournament decides the American Athletic Conference champion and guaranteed representative into the 2016 NCAA Division I Men's Soccer Championship. The semifinals and finals were played at Corbett Soccer Stadium on the campus of South Florida in Tampa, FL on November 11 & 13.

== Seeding and format ==
The teams are seeded based on their performance in the conference's round-robin regular season. The top four teams qualify for the event.

Team	W	L	T	Pct	Seed
South Florida	6	1	0	.857	1
Tulsa	4	2	1	.643	2
Connecticut	3	3	1	.500	3
UCF	3	4	0	.429	4

== Bracket ==
Semifinals
1	South Florida	2**
4	UCF	1
2	Tulsa	2
3	Connecticut	0

Finals
1	South Florida	1 (2)
2	Tulsa (pen.)	1 (4)**

Note: * denotes overtime period(s).

== Results ==
=== Semifinals ===
November 11, 2016	Tulsa	2–0	Connecticut	Tampa, Florida
4:30 p.m.	Sánchez 11'; Puig 62'	Report		Stadium: Corbett Stadium

November 11, 2016	South Florida	2–1	UCF	Tampa, Florida
7:00 p.m.	Bartman 77'; Epps 101'	Report	Colombo 61'	Stadium: Corbett Stadium

=== Final ===
November 13, 2016	Tulsa	1–1 (a.e.t.) (4–2 p)	South Florida	Tampa, Florida
12:00 p.m.	Sánchez 72'	Report	Bartman 52'	Stadium: Corbett Stadium
	Penalties
	Duncan (penalty scored); Puig (penalty scored); Raranje (penalty missed); Stavrou (penalty scored); Saari (penalty scored)		(penalty missed) Smith; (penalty scored) Gomez; (penalty missed) Rodriguez; (penalty missed) Epps

== All-Tournament team ==
- Jesus Colombo, UCF
- Abdou Mbacke Thiam, Connecticut
- Prosper Figbe, South Florida
- Marcus Epps, South Florida
- Nazeem Bartman, South Florida
- Spasoje Stefanovic, South Florida
- Quinton Duncan, Tulsa
- Juan Sánchez, Tulsa (most outstanding offensive player)
- Ray Saari, Tulsa
- Rollie Rocha, Tulsa
- Jake McGuire, Tulsa (most outstanding defensive player)

== Television/internet coverage ==
The semifinals were streamed live on the American Digital Network. The final was carried live on ESPN2 and 4 hours later on ESPNU.
