= 2016 ASUN men's soccer tournament =

- Classification: Division I
- Teams: 6
- Matches: 5
- Site: FGCU Soccer Complex; Fort Myers, Florida
- Champions: Florida Gulf Coast (4th title)
- Winning coach: Bob Butehorn (4th title)

The 2016 ASUN men's soccer tournament, the 38th edition of the tournament, determined the ASUN Conference's automatic berth into the 2016 NCAA Division I Men's Soccer Championship.

This was the first tournament held under the conference's current branding as the ASUN Conference. The league had been known as the Atlantic Sun Conference since 2002.

== Qualification ==
2016 Atlantic Sun Conference men's soccer standings
	Conf.					Overall
Team	W		L		T	W		L		T
North Florida	5	–	0	–	1	9	–	4	–	2
No. 20 FGCU ‡	4	–	1	–	1	14	–	4	–	3
Lipscomb	3	–	2	–	1	10	–	6	–	2
NJIT	3	–	2	–	1	8	–	6	–	4
Jacksonville	2	–	4	–	0	8	–	10	–	0
Stetson	1	–	5	–	0	4	–	10	–	2
USC Upstate	1	–	5	–	0	3	–	10	–	0
‡-2016 ASUN Tournament champion +- Invited to the 2016 NCAA Division I Men's Soccer Championship; As of 13 December 2016; Rankings from NSCAA

The top six teams in the ASUN Conference, based on their conference regular-season records, qualified for the tournament.

== Bracket ==
First round
4	NJIT	1
5	Jacksonville	2
3	Lipscomb	3
6	Stetson	0

Semifinals
1	North Florida	0
5	Jacksonville	1
2	Florida Gulf Coast	3 (2ot)
4	Lipscomb	2

Final
5	Jacksonville	2
2	Florida Gulf Coast	3

== Schedule ==
=== First round ===
November 3, 2016	Lipscomb	3–0	Stetson Hatters	Fort Myers, Florida
7:07 PM ET	Paynter 27' (Austin); Sakou 32' (Alvarado); Kerridge 57'; Chavez (yellow card) 71'	Report	Ferriera (yellow card) 24'; Carbone (yellow card) 71'	Stadium: FGCU Soccer Complex; Attendance: 62; Referee: Randy Cook

November 4, 2016	NJIT	1–2	Jacksonville	Jacksonville, Florida
7:07 PM ET	Kausch (yellow card) 49'; Flanagan (yellow card) 78'; Oldham (yellow card) 81'; Oldham (red card) 86'	Report	Gardner 8'; Team (o.g.); Bennett 36'; Spicer (yellow card) 56'; Mrabure (yellow card) 75'; Amico (yellow card) 78'	Stadium: Hodges Stadium; Attendance: 209; Referee: Martin Bel

=== Semi-finals ===
November 5, 2016	Florida Gulf Coast	3–2 ^{(2ot)}	Lipscomb	Fort Myers, Florida
7:07 PM ET	Ruiz 35' (Sobers-Assue & Zapata); Ruiz 61' (Zapata); Kilwein (yellow card) 81'; Mohsin 101' (Gavin)	Report	Paynter 28'; Reza (yellow card) 59'; Botes 63' (Paynter)	Stadium: FGCU Soccer Complex; Attendance: 317; Referee: Esteban Rosano

November 6, 2016	North Florida	0–1	Jacksonville	Jacksonville, Florida
7:00 PM ET	Begley (yellow card) 58'; Nunez (yellow card) 90'	Report	Ferreira 6' (Spicer); Spicer (yellow card) 43'	Stadium: Hodges Stadium; Attendance: 727; Referee: Richonne Clark

=== Championship ===
November 12, 2016	Florida Gulf Coast	3–2	Jacksonville	Fort Myers, Florida
7:00 PM (EST)	Ruia 15' (Sobers-Assue); Roubos 25' (Marriott & Kilwien); Roubos 82' (Marriott & Kilwien)	Report	Sanchez 25' (Bennett); Amico (yellow card) 47'; Mrabure 79' (Sanchez)	Stadium: FGCU Soccer Complex; Attendance: 1,163; Referee: Jonathan Weiner

== Statistics ==
SCORING
Rank	Player	School	Games	Goals	Assists	Points
1	Ruiz	FGCU	2	3	0	6
2	Paynter	Lipscomb	2	2	1	5
3	Roubos	FGCU	2	2	0	4
4	Bennett	Jacksonville	3	1	1	3
	Sanchez	Jacksonville	3	1	1	3
6	Botes	Lipscomb	2	1	0	2
	Ferreira	Jackspnville	3	1	0	2
	Gardiner	Jacksonville	3	1	0	2
	Mohsin	FGCU	2	1	0	2
	Mrabure	Jacksonville	3	1	0	2
	Kerridge	Lipscomb	2	1	0	2
	Sakou	Lipscomb	2	1	0	2
	Zapata	FGCU	1	0	2	2
	Kiwien	FGCU	2	0	2	2
	Marriott	FGCU	2	0	2	2
	Sobers-Assue	FGCU	2	0	2	2
17	Alvarado	Lipscomb	2	0	1	1
	Austin	Lipscomb	2	0	1	1
	Gavin	FGCU	2	0	1	1
	Spicer	Jacksonville	3	0	1	1

GOALKEEPING
Rank	Player	School	Games	Goals	Saves	Save %	Goals against ave.
1	Harding	Jacksonville	3	4	20	.833	1.333
2	Zappia	Lipscomb	2	3	6	.667	!.414
3	Brown	FGCU	2	4	8	.667	1.800
4	Ladwig	Stetson	1	3	5	.625	3.000
5	Pujades	NJIT	1	2	1	.333	2.000
6	Fajardo	North Florida	1	1	0	.000	1.000

== All-Tournament team ==
- Albert Ruiz, FGCU - MVP
- Eli Roubos, FGCU
- Miguel Jaime, FGCU
- Kamar Marriott, FGCU
- Patrick Harding, Jacksonville
- Kai Bennett, Jacksonville
- Allan Morgan, Jacksonville
- Joe Kerridge, Lipscomb
- Logan Paynter, Lipscomb
- Sylvester Szczesniewicz, North Florida
- Jay Bolt, North Florida

== See also ==
- Atlantic Sun Conference
- 2016 Atlantic Sun Conference men's soccer season
- 2016 NCAA Division I men's soccer season
- 2016 NCAA Division I Men's Soccer Championship
