= 2016 Summit League men's soccer season =

- League: NCAA Division I
- Sport: Soccer
- Duration: August, 2016 – November, 2016
- Teams: 10

2017 MLS SuperDraft
- Top draft pick: Reagan Dunk, Denver
- Picked by: Real Salt Lake, 13th overall

Regular season
- Season champions: Omaha
- Runners-up: Denver
- Season MVP: Offensive: Fazlo Alihodžić; Defensive: Reagan Dunk; Goalkeeper: Nick Gardner

Tournament
- Champions: Denver
- Runners-up: Omaha
- Finals MVP: Andre Shinyashiki

Summit League men's soccer seasons
- ← 2015 2017 →

2016 Summit League men's soccer standings
	Conf.					Overall
Team	W		L		T	W		L		T
No. 3 Denver ‡	5	–	0	–	1	20	–	1	–	3
Omaha	5	–	0	–	1	10	–	5	–	4
Western Illinois	3	–	3	–	0	8	–	10	–	1
Eastern Illinois	2	–	4	–	0	5	–	12	–	1
Fort Wayne	2	–	4	–	0	9	–	9	–	0
Oral Roberts	2	–	4	–	0	6	–	10	–	2
IUPUI	1	–	5	–	0	2	–	15	–	1
‡-Tournament Champion +-Invited to the 2016 NCAA Division I Men's Soccer Championship; As of 13 December 2016; Rankings from NSCAA

The 2016 The Summit League men's soccer season was the 11th season of men's varsity soccer in the conference.

The Denver Pioneers are both the defending regular season and conference tournament champions.

== Changes from 2015 ==
- None

== Teams ==
=== Stadiums and locations ===
Team	Location	Stadium	Capacity
Denver Pioneers	Denver, Colorado	University of Denver Soccer Stadium	2,000
Eastern Illinois Panthers	Charleston, Illinois	Lakeside Soccer Field	—N/a
Fort Wayne Mastodons	Fort Wayne, Indiana	Hefner Stadium	2,000
IUPUI Jaguars	Indianapolis, Indiana	Carroll Stadium	12,100
Omaha Mavericks	Omaha, Nebraska	Al F. Caniglia Field	3,097
Oral Roberts Golden Eagles	Tulsa, Oklahoma	Case Soccer Complex	1,000
Western Illinois Leathernecks	Macomb, Illinois	MacKenzie Alumni Field	1,000

- North Dakota State, South Dakota and South Dakota State do not sponsor men's soccer

== Regular season ==
=== Results ===
Home/Away	DEN	EIU	FWY	IPI	UNO	ORU	WIU
Denver Pioneers			4–3			Oct. 22	Oct. 15
Eastern Illinois Panthers	0–1		Oct. 23				Oct. 29
Fort Wayne Mastodons				Oct. 29	Oct. 15	3–1	
IUPUI Jaguars	0–1	Nov. 5					0–2
Omaha Mavericks	1–1	2–0		3–1			
Oral Roberts Golden Eagles		3–2		Oct. 15	Nov. 5		
Western Illinois Leathernecks			Nov. 5		Oct. 22	4–0	

=== Rankings ===
Legend
Increase in ranking
Decrease in ranking
Not ranked previous week

		Pre	Wk 1	Wk 2	Wk 3	Wk 4	Wk 5	Wk 6	Wk 7	Wk 8	Wk 9	Wk 10	Wk 11	Wk 12	Final
Denver	C	20	13	11	8	8	8	7	5	5	4	6	4	4	3
Eastern Illinois	C														
Fort Wayne	C														
IUPUI	C														
Omaha	C														
Oral Roberts	C														
Western Illinois	C														

== Postseason ==
=== Summit League tournament ===
Semifinals
1	Omaha	3
4	Eastern Illinois	1
2	Denver	1
3	Western Illinois	0

Championship
1	Omaha	1
2	Denver	2

=== NCAA tournament ===
Seed	Region	School	1st round	2nd round	3rd round	Quarterfinals	Semifinals	Championship
6	Clemson	Denver	BYE	W 3–0 vs. UNLV – (Denver)	W 2–1 vs. #11 Washington – (Denver)	W 1–0 vs. #3 Clemson – (Clemson)	vs. #2 Wake Forest – (Houston)	

== All-Summit League awards and teams ==
2016 Summit League Men's Soccer Individual Awards
Award	Recipient(s)
Offensive Player of the Year	Fazlo Alihodžić, Omaha
Defensive Player of the Year	Reagan Dunk, Denver
Goalkeeper of the Year	Nick Gardner, Denver
Coach of the Year	Jamie Franks, Denver
Newcomer of the Year	Emmanuel Hamzat, Omaha

2016 Summit League Men's Soccer All-Conference Teams
First Team	Second Team	Newcomer Team
Fazlo Alihodzic (M), Sr., Omaha; Jacob Bevan (F), Sr., Western Illinois; Reagan Dunk (D), Sr., Denver; Kortne Ford (D), Jr., Denver; Nick Gardner (GK), So., Denver; Joseph Ghitis (GK), Jr., Omaha; Sam Hamilton (M), Sr., Denver; Emmanuel Hamzat (F), Jr., Omaha; Karsten Hanlin (F), Sr., Denver; Seth Rinderknecht (D), Fr., Omaha; Zach Tom (M), So., Fort Wayne	Scott DeVoss (D), So., Denver; Blake Elder (F), Jr., Denver; Ben Fiddes (D), Jr., Western Illinois; Mark Moulton (M), Sr., Omaha; Mike Novotny (GK), Jr., Eastern Illinois; Fernando Pacheco (M), Jr., Western Illinois; Santiago Riveros (M), Jr., Oral Roberts; Andre Shinyashiki (F), So., Denver; Graham Smith (M), Jr., Denver; Oscar Uyamadu (F), Jr., Fort Wayne; Jacob Weiler (D), Jr., Omaha	Alex Castaneda (F), Fr., Eastern Illinois; Daniel Collins (M), Sr., Western Illinois; Blake Elder (F), Jr., Denver; Fred Frimpong (M), Fr., Omaha; Thibaut Giquel (GK), So., Oral Roberts; Emmanuel Hamzat (F), Jr., Omaha; Jonathan Huerta (M), Fr., Eastern Illinois; Tyler LaCourse (D), Fr., Oral Roberts; Anton Olsson (D), Fr., Eastern Illinois; Seth Rinderknecht (D), Fr., Omaha; Graham Smith (M), Jr., Denver

== See also ==
- 2016 NCAA Division I men's soccer season
- 2016 The Summit League Men's Soccer Tournament
- 2016 The Summit League women's soccer season
