= 2016 Denver Pioneers men's soccer team =

American college soccer season

2016 Denver Pioneers men's soccer

Summit League Regular Season Co-Champions Summit League Tournament Champions

NCAA Tournament, College Cup, L 1–2 (2OT) vs. Wake Forest
- Conference: Summit League

Ranking
- Coaches: No. 3
- Record: 20–1–3 (5–0–1 Summit)
- Head coach: Jamie Franks (2nd season)
- Assistant coaches: Ryan Hopkins (4th season); Levi Rossi (2nd season); Zander Dietz (2nd season)
- Home stadium: CIBER Field

2016 Summit League men's soccer standings
	Conf.					Overall
Team	W		L		T	W		L		T
No. 3 Denver ‡	5	–	0	–	1	20	–	1	–	3
Omaha	5	–	0	–	1	10	–	5	–	4
Western Illinois	3	–	3	–	0	8	–	10	–	1
Eastern Illinois	2	–	4	–	0	5	–	12	–	1
Fort Wayne	2	–	4	–	0	9	–	9	–	0
Oral Roberts	2	–	4	–	0	6	–	10	–	2
IUPUI	1	–	5	–	0	2	–	15	–	1
‡-Tournament Champion +-Invited to the 2016 NCAA Division I Men's Soccer Championship; As of 13 December 2016; Rankings from NSCAA

The 2016 Denver Pioneers men's soccer team represented the University of Denver during the 2016 NCAA Division I men's soccer season. The Pioneers played in Summit League where they won the regular season and conference tournament titles. They finished the regular season as one of only two unbeaten teams, the other being top-ranked Maryland.

The Pioneers qualified for the NCAA Tournament for the fourth straight season and their seventh overall time. The Pioneers earned a Second Round-bye and were seeded sixth in the tournament. In the second round, they played the UNLV Rebels where they won 3–0, marking their first NCAA Tournament win since 1970. They then defeated Washington 2–1 at home and third-seeded Clemson 1–0 on the road to advance to the school's first-ever College Cup.

== Roster ==
As of 19 November 2016

Squad No.	Name	Nationality	Year	Hometown	Previous School	Previous club
Goalkeepers
00	James Bannon-Schneebeck	(United States)	RS Junior (redshirt)	Albuquerque, NM	Albuquerque	Rio '95
0	Nick Gardner	(United States)	RS Sophomore (redshirt)	Marvin, NC	Charlotte Latin	Charlotte Soccer Academy
30	Will Palmquist	(United States)	FR	Denver, CO	Denver East	Colorado Rush
Defenders
2	Tobi Jnohope	(United States)	Freshman	Auburn, WA	Jefferson (WA)	Seattle Sounders FC Academy
3	Shae Smalley	(United States)	Sophomore	Columbus, OH	Olentangy Orange	Columbus Crew Academy
4	Reagan Dunk	(United States)	RS Senior (redshirt)	Dallas, TX	Lake Highlands	Solar Chelsea
5	Scott DeVoss	(United States)	RS Sophomore (redshirt)	Centennial, CO	Arapahoe	Real Colorado Foxes
16	Tosh Samkange	(United States)	Sophomore	Sammamish, WA	Eastlake (WA)	Seattle Sounders FC Academy
19	A. J. Fuller	(United States)	Junior	Littleton, CO	Heritage (CO)	Colorado Rush
21	Kortne Ford	(United States)	Junior	Greeley, CO	Greeley Central	Colorado Rapids Academy
25	Dylan Keeney	(United States)	Freshman	Littleton, CO	Heritage (CO)	Real Colorado Academy
27	Dan Mooney	(United States)	RS Freshman	Indianapolis, IN	Cathedral (IN)	Indiana Fire Academy
Midfielders
8	Sam Hamilton	(United States)	Senior	Evergreen, CO	Evergreen (CO)	Colorado Rush
12	Graham Smith	(United States)	Junior	Highlands Ranch, CO	Oregon State	Oregon State Beavers
13	Nick Marcin	(United States)	Freshman	Austin, TX	Westlake (TX)	Lonestar SC
14	Ryan Barlow	(United States)	RS Freshman (redshirt)	Coppell, TX	Coppell	FC Dallas Academy
15	Jared Cochran	(United States)	RS Junior (redshirt)	Evergreen, CO	Evergreen (CO)	Colorado Rush
17	Karsten Hanlin	(United States)	RS SR	Centennial, Colo.	(Cherry Creek High School)	Colorado Rapids Academy
18	Kyle Morlack	(United States)	RS JR	Goodyear, Ariz.	(Millennium High School)	SC Del Sol Armstrong
20	Chandler Crosswait	(United States)	RS SR	Bedford, Texas	(L.D. Bell High School)	Solar Chelsea
22	Blake Moncur	(United States)	FR	Fort Collins, Colo.	(Fort Collins High School)	Colorado Rapids Academy
23	Alex Underwood	(United States)	JR	Winnetka, Ill.	(New Trier High School)	Chicago Fire Academy
26	Kenny Akamatsu	(Japan)	Sophomore	Niigata, Japan	(Nittan Daigaka Buzan)	Mitsubishi Yowa Soccer Club
Forwards
6	Blake Elder	(United States)	RS Junior (redshirt)	Fort Worth, TX	U.S. Air Force Academy	Air Force Falcons
9	Andre Shinyashiki	(Brazil)	Sophomore	São Paulo, BRA	Montverde Academy	Pequeninos do Jockey
11	Eric Kronenberg	(United States)	RS Junior (redshirt)	Boulder, CO	Fairview High School (CO)	Colorado Rapids Academy
33	Ryan Schaefer	(United States)	RS Freshman	Burien, WA	Kennedy Catholic	Seattle Sounders Academy

== Schedule ==
Date Time, TV	Rank^{#}	Opponent^{#}	Result	Record	Site (Attendance) City, State
Exhibitions
08/20/16*; 3:00 p.m.	No. 20	at Air Force	T 0–0		Cadet Soccer Stadium; Colorado Springs, CO
Regular Season
08/26/16*; 3:00 p.m., ESPN3	No. 20	at Monmouth	T 1–1 ^{2OT}	0–0–1	Hesse Field (1,513); West Long Branch, NJ
08/28/16*; 10:00 a.m., BTN	No. 20	at No. 25 Rutgers	W 1–0	1–0–1	Yurcak Field (325); Piscataway, NJ
09/02/16*; 2:00 p.m., BTN	No. 13	at Northwestern	W 2–1	2–0–1	Martin Stadium (504); Evanston, IL
09/04/16*; 6:00 p.m.	No. 13	at UIC	W 2–1	3–0–1	Flames Field (333); Chicago, IL
09/09/16*; 7:00 p.m., Altitude	No. 11	UC Riverside	W 4–1	4–0–1	CIBER Field (912); Denver, CO
09/09/16*; 7:00 p.m., Altitude	No. 11	Bryant	W 2–0	5–0–1	CIBER Field (489); Denver, CO
09/15/16*; 7:00 p.m.	No. 8	Saint Louis	W 2–0	6–0–1	CIBER Field (576); Denver, CO
09/17/16*; 7:00 p.m.	No. 8	North Florida	W 1–0	7–0–1	CIBER Field (607); Denver, CO
09/21/16*; 6:00 p.m.	No. 8	at No. 12 Creighton	T 0–0 ^{2OT}	7–0–2	Morrison Stadium (2,048); Omaha, NE
09/24/16; 7:00 p.m., Altitude	No. 8	Fort Wayne	W 4–3	8–0–2 (1–0)	CIBER Field (685); Denver, CO
10/01/16; 11:00 a.m.	No. 8	at Eastern Illinois	W 1–0	9–0–2 (2–0)	West Practice Fields (80); Charleston, IL
10/07/16; 5:00 p.m.	No. 7	at IUPUI	W 1–0	10–0–2 (3–0)	Carroll Stadium (80); Indianapolis, IN
10/10/16; 5:00 p.m.	No. 7	at No. 9 Butler	W 1–0	11–0–2	Butler Bowl (804); Indianapolis, IN
10/15/16; 7:00 p.m.	No. 5	Western Illinois	W 2–0	12–0–2 (4–0)	CIBER Field (667); Denver, CO
10/19/16*; 7:00 p.m., Altitude	No. 5	No. 22 New Mexico; I-25 Derby	W 2–1 ^{2OT}	13–0–2	CIBER Field (576); Denver, CO
10/22/16; 7:00 p.m., Altitude 2	No. 5	Oral Roberts	W 2–0	14–0–2 (5–0)	CIBER Field (645); Denver, CO
10/29/16; 7:00 p.m.	No. 4	at Omaha	T 0–0 ^{2OT}	14–0–3 (5–0–1)	Caniglia Field (1,025); Omaha, NE
11/03/16*; 7:00 p.m.	No. 6	No. 24 Portland	W 2–1 ^{2OT}	15–0–3	CIBER Field (885); Denver, CO
The Summit Tournament
11/10/16; 4:00 p.m., Altitude 2	No. 4 (2)	No. (3) Eastern Illinois; Semifinals	W 1–0	16–0–3	CIBER Field (201); Denver, CO
11/12/16; 1:00 p.m.	No. 4 (2)	No. (1) Omaha; Championship	W 2–1	17–0–3	CIBER Field (683); Denver, CO
NCAA Tournament
11/20/16*; 5:00 p.m.	No. 4 (6)	UNLV; Second Round	W 3–0	18–0–3	CIBER Field (1,070); Denver, CO
11/27/16*; 5:00 p.m.	No. 4 (6)	No. 14 (11) Washington; Sweet 16	W 2–1	19–0–3	CIBER Field (1,640); Denver, CO
12/02/16*; 5:00 p.m.	No. 4 (6)	at No. 3 (3) Clemson; Quarterfinals	W 1–0	20–0–3	Riggs Field (4,101); Clemson, SC
12/09/16*; 6:00 p.m.	No. 4 (6)	vs. No. 2 (2) Wake Forest; College Cup – Semifinals	L 1–2 ^{2OT}	20–1–3	BBVA Compass Stadium (6,056); Houston, TX
*Non-conference game. ^{#}Rankings from United Soccer Coaches. (#) Tournament seedings in parentheses.

== Rankings ==
Ranking movement Legend: ██ Improvement in ranking. ██ Decrease in ranking. ██ Not ranked the previous week. RV=Others receiving votes.
Poll	Pre	Wk 1	Wk 2	Wk 3	Wk 4	Wk 5	Wk 6	Wk 7	Wk 8	Wk 9	Wk 10	Wk 11	Wk 12	Final
NSCAA	20	13	11	8	8	8	7	5	5	4	6	4	4	3
