= Kyle Gookins =

American soccer coach

Personal information
- Full name: Kyle Lawrences Gookins
- Date of birth: June 24, 1982 (age 44)
- Place of birth: Lancaster, California
- Position: Forward

College career
Years	Team	Apps	(Gls)
2000–2003	CSU Bakersfield	?	(29)

Senior career*
Years	Team	Apps	(Gls)
2003–2006	Bakersfield Brigade		

Managerial career
- 2007–2008: CSU Bakersfield Roadrunners (assistant)
- 2008–2016: Charlotte 49ers (assistant)
- 2017: Stetson Hatters
- * Club domestic league appearances and goals

Kyle Gookins (born June 24, 1982) is an American soccer coach who most previously coached the Stetson Hatters men's soccer program. Gookins attended California State University, Bakersfield for both his Bachelor's and Master's, and also played for their soccer team.

== Career ==
Kyle Gookins began his coaching career immediately after graduating from undergrad, becoming a graduate assistant coach for the CSU Bakerfield Roadrunners. Gookins was part of the Roadrunners program as a graduate assistant coach through 2008. Later that year, he joined the Jeremy Gunn's coaching staff at the University of North Carolina Charlotte. He remained an associate head coach through 2011, and following the team's run to the NCAA national championship, was promoted to top assistant head coach.

On December 21, 2016, Gookins was hired by Stetson University to coach their men's soccer program. In his first season in charge, Gookins was named ASUN Conference Coach of the Year. On November 15, 2017, less than a year in charge, Gookins resigned as the head coach of Stetson citing personal and family reasons.

== Head coaching record ==
Record table
Season	Team	Overall	Conference	Standing	Postseason
Stetson Hatters (ASUN Conference) (2017–present)
2017	Stetson	7–7–2	4–0–2	1st	A-Sun Semifinals
Stetson:		7–7–2 (.500)	4–0–2 (.833)		
Total:		7–7–2 (.500)			
National champion Postseason invitational champion Conference regular season champion Conference regular season and conference tournament champion Division regular season champion Division regular season and conference tournament champion Conference tournament champion
