= 2016 Summit League men's soccer tournament =

- Classification: Division I
- Teams: 4
- Matches: 3
- Site: CIBER Field; Denver, Colorado
- Champions: Denver (4th title)
- Winning coach: Jamie Franks (2nd title)

2016 Summit League men's soccer standings
	Conf.					Overall
Team	W		L		T	W		L		T
No. 3 Denver ‡	5	–	0	–	1	20	–	1	–	3
Omaha	5	–	0	–	1	10	–	5	–	4
Western Illinois	3	–	3	–	0	8	–	10	–	1
Eastern Illinois	2	–	4	–	0	5	–	12	–	1
Fort Wayne	2	–	4	–	0	9	–	9	–	0
Oral Roberts	2	–	4	–	0	6	–	10	–	2
IUPUI	1	–	5	–	0	2	–	15	–	1
‡-Tournament Champion +-Invited to the 2016 NCAA Division I Men's Soccer Championship; As of 13 December 2016; Rankings from NSCAA

The 2016 Summit League men's soccer tournament, was the 11th edition of the tournament. It determined the Summit League's automatic berth into the 2016 NCAA Division I Men's Soccer Championship.

The Denver Pioneers won The Summit League title, besting the Omaha Mavericks, 2–1 in the championship match. It was Denver's fourth Summit League title and their fourth consecutive.

The tournament was hosted by the University of Denver and all matches were contested at CIBER Field at the University of Denver Soccer Stadium.

== Seeds ==
The top four teams participate in the tournament. The seeding is based on the program's conference record during the 2016 Summit League season.

Seed	School	Conference	Tiebreaker
1	Omaha	5–0–1	+8 GD
2	Denver	5–0–1	+7 GD
3	Western Illinois	3–3	
4	Eastern Illinois	2–4	−2 GD

- Oral Roberts and Fort Wayne also had 2–4 conference records but a poorer goal differential

== Bracket ==
Semifinals
1	Omaha	3
4	Eastern Illinois	1
2	Denver	1
3	Western Illinois	0

Championship
1	Omaha	1
2	Denver	2

== Results ==
=== Semifinals ===
November 10, 2016	^{#1} Omaha	3–1	^{#4} Eastern Illinois	Denver, Colorado
1:00 PM MDT	Alihodžić 12'; Ibišević 26'; Hamadi 62'	Report	Huerta 74'	Stadium: CIBER Field; Attendance: 0 Referee: Cesar Ibarra

November 10, 2016	^{#2} Denver	1–0	^{#3} Western Illinois	Denver, Colorado
4:00 PM MDT	Hanlin 81'	Report		Stadium: CIBER Field; Attendance: 201; Referee: Christopher Koloffon

=== Championship ===
November 12, 2016	^{#1} Omaha	1–2	^{#2} Denver	Denver, Colorado
1:00 PM MDT	Weiler 58'	Report	Shinyashiki 75', 90'	Stadium: CIBER Field; Attendance: 583; Referee: Keith Angel

== Statistical leaders ==
=== Top goalscorers ===
Rank	Player	College	Goals
1	(Brazil) Andre Shinyashiki	Denver	2
2	(Bosnia and Herzegovina) Fazlo Alihodžić	Omaha	1
2	(United States) Karsten Hanlin	Denver	1
2	(Kenya) Noor Hamadi	Omaha	1
2	(United States) Jonathan Huerta	Eastern Illinois	1
2	(Bosnia and Herzegovina) Elvir Ibišević	Omaha	1
2	(United States) Jacob Weiler	Omaha	1
