= 2016 ASUN Conference men's soccer season =

- League: NCAA Division I
- Sport: Soccer
- Duration: August, 2016 – November, 2016
- Teams: 7

Regular season
- Season champions: North Florida
- Runners-up: Florida Gulf Coast

Tournament
- Champions: Florida Gulf Coast
- Runners-up: Jacksonville

Atlantic Sun men's soccer seasons
- ← 2015 2017 →

2016 Atlantic Sun Conference men's soccer standings
| | Conf. | | | | | Overall |
| Team | W | | L | | T | W | | L | | T |
|---|---|---|---|---|---|---|---|---|---|---|
| North Florida | 5 | – | 0 | – | 1 | 9 | – | 4 | – | 2 |
| No. 20 FGCU ‡ | 4 | – | 1 | – | 1 | 14 | – | 4 | – | 3 |
| Lipscomb | 3 | – | 2 | – | 1 | 10 | – | 6 | – | 2 |
| NJIT | 3 | – | 2 | – | 1 | 8 | – | 6 | – | 4 |
| Jacksonville | 2 | – | 4 | – | 0 | 8 | – | 10 | – | 0 |
| Stetson | 1 | – | 5 | – | 0 | 4 | – | 10 | – | 2 |
| USC Upstate | 1 | – | 5 | – | 0 | 3 | – | 10 | – | 0 |
‡-2016 ASUN Tournament champion +- Invited to the 2016 NCAA Division I Men's Soccer Championship; As of 13 December 2016; Rankings from NSCAA

The 2016 ASUN Conference men's soccer season was the 39th season of men's varsity soccer in the ASUN Conference, and also the first under the league's current "ASUN" branding.

The North Florida Ospreys are both the defending regular season and conference tournament champions.

== Changes from 2015 ==
- The NJIT Highlanders joined the conference.

== Teams ==
=== Stadia and locations ===
| Team | Location | Stadium | Capacity |
|---|---|---|---|
| Florida Gulf Coast Eagles | Fort Myers, Florida | FGCU Soccer Complex | 1,000 |
| Jacksonville Dolphins | Jacksonville, Florida | Ashley Sports Complex | 500 |
| Lipscomb Bisons | Nashville, Tennessee | Lipscomb Soccer Complex | 250 |
| North Florida Ospreys | Jacksonville, Florida | Hodges Stadium | 9,400 |
| NJIT Highlanders | Newark, New Jersey | Mal Simon Stadium | 1,200 |
| Stetson Hatters | DeLand, Florida | Stetson Soccer Field | 900 |
| USC Upstate Spartans | Spartanburg, South Carolina | County University Soccer Stadium | 3,000 |

=== Personnel ===
| Team | Head coach | Captain | Shirt supplier |
|---|---|---|---|
| Florida Gulf Coast Eagles | (United States) Bob Butehorn | TBA | Adidas |
| Jacksonville Dolphins | (United States) Ryan Pratt | TBA | Nike |
| Lipscomb Bisons | (United States) Charles Morrow | TBA | Nike |
| NJIT Highlanders | (United States) Fernando Barboto | TBA | Nike |
| North Florida Ospreys | (Cuba) Derek Marinatos | TBA | Nike |
| Stetson Hatters | (United States) Logan Fleck | TBA | Nike |
| USC Upstate Spartans | (United States) Greg Hooks | TBA | Nike |

== Regular season ==
=== Results ===
| Team/opponent | FGC | JAX | LIP | NJT | UNF | STE | USC |
|---|---|---|---|---|---|---|---|
| Florida Gulf Coast Eagles | | | | 4–1 | | | |
| Jacksonville Dolphins | | | 2–1 | 0–1 | | | |
| Lipscomb Bisons | | 1–2 | | | | 2–0 | |
| NJIT Highlanders | 1–4 | 1–0 | | | | | |
| North Florida Ospreys | | | | | | | |
| Stetson Hatters | | | 0–2 | | | | 2–1 |
| USC Upstate Spartans | | | | | | 1–2 | |

=== Rankings ===
Legend
| Increase in ranking |
| Decrease in ranking |
| Not ranked previous week |

| | | Pre | Wk 1 | Wk 2 | Wk 3 | Wk 4 | Wk 5 | Wk 6 | Wk 7 | Wk 8 | Wk 9 | Wk 10 | Wk 11 | Wk 12 | Final |
|---|---|---|---|---|---|---|---|---|---|---|---|---|---|---|---|
| Florida Gulf Coast | C | RV | | | | RV | 15 | 12 | 12 | 11 | 20 | 22 | 21 | 20 | 20 |
| Jacksonville | C | | | | | | | | | | | | | | |
| Lipscomb | C | | RV | | | | | | | | | | | | |
| NJIT | C | | | | | | | | | | | | | | |
| North Florida | C | | RV | RV | RV | RV | NR | | | | RV | RV | NR | | |
| Stetson | C | | | | | | | | | | | | | | |
| USC Upstate | C | | | | | | | | | | | | | | |

== Postseason ==
=== A-Sun tournament ===
Semifinals
1 | North Florida | 0
5 | Jacksonville | 1
2 | Florida Gulf Coast (2OT) | 3
4 | Lipscomb | 2

Final
5 | Jacksonville
2 | Florida Gulf Coast

=== NCAA tournament ===
| Seed | Region | School | 1st round | 2nd round | 3rd round | Quarterfinals | Semifinals | Championship |
|---|---|---|---|---|---|---|---|---|
| —N/a | 1 | Florida Gulf Coast | T, 2–2 ^{(W, 3–0 pen.)} vs. South Florida – (Tampa) | L, 2–3 ^{OT}vs. #9 North Carolina – (Chapel Hill) | | | | |

== All-Atlantic Sun awards and teams ==
2016 A-Sun Men's Soccer Individual Awards
| Award | Recipient(s) |
| Player of the Year | Albert Ruiz, FGCU |
| Defensive Player of the Year | Jay Bolt, North Florida |
| Goalkeeper of the Year | Paul Ladwig, Stetson |
| Coaching Staff of the Year | North Florida |
| Freshman of the Year | Adrian Nunez, North Florida* |

2016 A-Sun Men's Soccer All-Conference Teams
| First Team | Second Team | Rookie Team |
| GK – Paul Ladwig, Stetson; D – Nicolas Samayoa, FGCU; D – Joe Kerridge, Lipscomb; D – Jay Bolt, North Florida; MF – Kamar Marriott, FGCU; MF – Ivan Alvarado, Lipscomb; MF – Joshua Castellanos, North Florida; F – Albert Ruiz, FGCU; F – Arion Sobers-Assue, FGCU; F – Logan Paynter, Lipscomb; F – Adrian Nunez, North Florida | GK – Juanes Fajardo, North Florida; D – Eli Roubos, FGCU; D – Scout Monteith, Lipscomb; D – Victor Kausch, NJIT; D – Simen Solstad, North Florida; MF – Dylan Sacramento, FGCU; MF – Alberto Escobedo, Jacksonville; MF – Micah Smoak, North Florida; MF – Luke Ferreira, Stetson; F – Ivan Sakou, Lipscomb; F – Mamadou Guirassy, NJIT; F – Milan Kovacs, North Florida | F – Adrian Nunez, North Florida; MF – Miguel Perez, FGCU; MF – Kai Bennett, Jacksonville; F – Rene White, NJIT; F – Gabriel Diniz, Stetson; F – Shak Adams, FGCU; GK – Jared Brown, FGCU; D – Austin Eager, Lipscomb; MF – Andrew Nino, NJIT; GK – Victor Pujades, NJIT; MF – Cormac Begley, North Florida; F – Joel Bunting, USC Upstate |

== See also ==
- 2016 NCAA Division I men's soccer season
- 2016 ASUN Men's Soccer Tournament
- 2016 Atlantic Sun Conference women's soccer season
