= 2017 ASUN men's soccer tournament =

- Classification: Division I
- Teams: 6
- Matches: 5
- Quarterfinals site: Higher seeds
- Semifinals site: Higher seeds
- Finals site: Southern Oak Stadium; Jacksonville, Florida
- Champions: Lipscomb (1st title)
- Winning coach: Charles Morrow (1st title)
- MVP: Ivan Sakou (Lipscomb)
- Broadcast: ESPN3, Facebook Live

2017 ASUN Conference men's soccer standings
	Conf.					Overall
Team	W		L		T	W		L		T
Stetson	4	–	0	–	2	7	–	7	–	2
Florida Gulf Coast	4	–	1	–	1	8	–	6	–	3
NJIT	3	–	2	–	1	8	–	7	–	4
North Florida	2	–	3	–	1	3	–	10	–	2
Jacksonville	2	–	3	–	1	6	–	10	–	1
Lipscomb ‡	2	–	4	–	0	11	–	8	–	2
USC Upstate	1	–	5	–	0	3	–	10	–	2
‡ – 2017 ASUN tournament champion + – Invited to the 2017 NCAA Division I Men's Soccer Championship; As of November 17, 2017; Rankings from United Soccer Coaches

The 2017 ASUN Conference men's soccer tournament, the 39th edition of the tournament, determined the ASUN Conference's automatic berth into the 2017 NCAA Division I Men's Soccer Championship.

== Seeds ==
The top six of seven teams qualified for the ASUN Tournament. The top two regular season finishers earned a bye to the semifinals.

Seed	Team	W	L	T	Pct	Pts
1	Stetson	4	0	2	.833	14
2	Florida Gulf Coast	4	1	1	.750	13
3	NJIT	3	2	1	.583	10
4	North Florida	2	3	1	.417	7
5	Jacksonville	2	3	1	.417	7
6	Lipscomb	2	4	0	.333	6

== Bracket ==
First round November 3
4	North Florida	1
5	Jacksonville	2
3	NJIT	3 (3)
6	Lipscomb	3 (3)

Semifinals; November 5
1	Stetson	1
5	Jacksonville (2OT)	2
2	Florida Gulf Coast	1
6	Lipscomb	2

Final; November 11
5	Jacksonville	1
6	Lipscomb	2

== Results ==
=== First round ===
November 3
4:00 PM EST

^{No. 4} North Florida Ospreys	1–2	^{No. 5} Jacksonville Dolphins
Smoak 12'	Report	Ferreira 13'; Baruani 78'

Stetson Athletic Training Center Field, DeLand, Florida
Attendance: 175
Referee: Guido Gonzales

November 3
5:10 PM EST

^{No. 3} NJIT Highlanders	3–3 (a.e.t.)	^{No. 6} Lipscomb Bisons
Jimenez 33', 85'; Cordeiro 87'	Report	Sakou 13', 22'; Birchfield 19'
Penalties
Guirassy (penalty missed); Zapata (penalty missed); Jimenez (penalty missed)	0–3	(penalty missed) Paynter; (penalty scored) Smith; (penalty scored) Reza; (penalty scored) Locke

FGCU Soccer Complex, Fort Myers, Florida
Attendance: 46
Referee: Mark Kadlecik

=== Semifinals ===
November 5
1:00 PM EST

^{No. 2} Florida Gulf Coast Eagles	1–2	^{No. 6} Lipscomb Bisons
Zapata 29'	Report	Sakou 1'; Paynter 71'

FGCU Soccer Complex, Fort Myers, Florida
Attendance: 288
Referee: Esteban Rosano

November 4
7:00 PM EST

^{No. 1} Stetson Hatters	1–2 (a.e.t.)	^{No. 5} Jacksonville Dolphins
Dogan 87'	Report	Ferreira 2'; Escobedo 106'

Stetson Athletic Training Center Field, DeLand, Florida
Attendance: 375

=== Final ===
November 11
7:00 PM EST

^{No. 5} Jacksonville Dolphins	1–2	^{No. 6} Lipscomb Bisons
Muccilli 62'	Report	Smith 30'; Reza 69'

Southern Oak Stadium, Jacksonville, Florida
Attendance: 613

== Statistics ==
=== Goals ===
Rank	Player	College	Goals
1	(Cameroon) Ivan Sakou	Lipscomb	3
2	(Brazil) Igor Ferreira	Jacksonville	2
2	(Spain) Pablo Jimenez	NJIT	2
4	(England) Ryan Birchfield	Lipscomb	1
4	(Italy) Danny Cordiero	NJIT	1
4	(Tanzania) Selemani Baruani	Jacksonville	1
4	(Germany) Deniz Dogan	Stetson	1
4	(Mexico) Alberto Escobedo	Jacksonville	1
4	(United States) Logan Paynter	Lipscomb	1
4	(United States) Micah Smoak	North Florida	1
4	(United States) Dennis Zapata	Florida Gulf Coast	1

=== Assists ===
Rank	Player	College	Assists
1	(United States) Ivan Alvarado	Lipscomb	2
1	(United States) Kai Bennett	Jacksonville	2
3	(United States) Shak Adams	Florida Gulf Coast	1
3	(France) Chris Clement	Florida Gulf Coast	1
3	(United States) Mikey Connell	North Florida	1
3	(United States) Austin Eager	Lipscomb	1
3	(Canada) Sam Gardner	Jacksonville	1
3	(France) Mamadou Guirassy	NJIT	1
3	(Spain) Pablo Jimenez	NJIT	1
3	(United States) Logan Paynter	Lipscomb	1
3	(United States) Kyle Smith	Lipscomb	1
3	(United States) Juan Zapata	NJIT	1

=== Shutouts ===
There were no shutouts in the tournament.

== All-Tournament team ==
- Ivan Sakou, Lipscomb - MVP
- Logan Paynter, Lipscomb
- Ivan Alvarado, Lipscomb
- Ryan Birchfield, Lipscomb
- Eduardo Reza, Lipscomb
- Ignazio Muccilli, Jacksonville
- Igor Ferreira, Jacksonville
- Kai Bennett, Jacksonville
- Dennis Zapata, FGCU
- Pablo Jimenez, NJIT
- Deniz Dogan, Stetson

== See also ==
- 2017 Atlantic Sun Conference Women's Soccer Tournament
