= Eric Barnes (soccer) =

American soccer player

Personal information
- Place of birth: Aiken, South Carolina, U.S.

Youth career
- Years: Team
- 2006–2007: George Mason Patriots
- 2008–2009: Pittsburgh Panthers

Managerial career
- 2009–2011: Pittsburgh Panthers (assistant coach)
- 2012: Niagara Purple Eagles (assistant coach)
- 2013–2015: Niagara Purple Eagles (head coach)

Eric Barnes is an American head coach and a former soccer player. He holds a NSCAA Premier Diploma and an NSCAA Advanced National Goalkeeping Diploma. Barnes is a grade 6 USSF Referee and a member of the National Intercollegiate Soccer Officials Association.

== Playing career ==
A 2004 graduate of South Aiken High School in Aiken, S.C., Barnes earned a Bachelor's degree in health, fitness and recreation resources with a concentration in sport management in 2007 from George Mason University, where he played collegiately for two years. He then played two years at the University of Pittsburgh while earning his Juris Doctor.

Barnes also played professionally for the Carolina Dynamo (USL Premier Development League) in 2007 and for the Pittsburgh Riverhounds (USL-2) during the 2009 season.

== Coaching career ==
Barnes served as Pittsburgh Panthers men's soccer assistant coach from 2009 until joining the Niagara Purple Eagles men's soccer team also as an assistant coach in 2012. The following season, 2013, he became Niagara's head coach. He was replaced by Bill Boyle at Niagara in 2016.
