= Elvir Ibišević =

Bosnian footballer

Personal information
- Date of birth: 10 February 1998 (age 28)
- Place of birth: Tuzla, Bosnia and Herzegovina
- Height: 1.88 m (6 ft 2 in)
- Position: Forward

Youth career
- 2011–2013: Sporting Kansas City
- 2014–2015: IMG Academy

College career
Years	Team	Apps	(Gls)
2016–2017	Omaha Mavericks	36	(13)

Senior career*
Years	Team	Apps	(Gls)
2016–2018	Des Moines Menace	19	(5)
2018–2019	NK Celje	22	(1)
2019	Chemie Leipzig	6	(0)
2020	Union Omaha	9	(0)

International career^{‡}
2015	United States U17	2	(0)
2018	Bosnia and Herzegovina	1	(0)
- * Club domestic league appearances and goals as of 25 October 2020 ‡ National team caps and goals as of 3 March 2019

Elvir Ibišević (born 10 February 1998) is a Bosnian former professional footballer who played as a forward. He represented Bosnia and Herzegovina national football team at the senior level.

== Club career ==
Born in Bosnia and Herzegovina, Ibišević grew up in the United States. Ibišević was a star soccer player at Johnston High School, and was a member of the Sporting Kansas City academy. He opted to join the Omaha Mavericks a year early in 2016. Ibišević joined the Des Moines Menace in 2016, and was the youngest member of the team.

In July 2018, Elvir officially joined NK Celje in the Slovenian Prva Liga on 3-year deal. He made his official debut for the club in a match against Triglav Kranj on August 18. He scored his first goal for NK Celje on October 27 against Triglav Kranj.

In July 2019, NK Celje announced they would be parting ways with Ibišević, leaving him a free agent. He would join Chemie Leipzig. On December 19, the club announced that they would part ways with Elvir by mutual consent.

== International career ==
Ibišević was born in Bosnia and Herzegovina, but moved to the United States at the age of 2 and was raised in Johnston, Iowa. Previously a youth international for the United States, he was called up to the Bosnia and Herzegovina national football team for a friendly match against the USA on 28 January 2018. He made his debut in the 83rd minute of the 0–0 tie with the United States.

== Personal life ==
Ibišević is the cousin of the Bosnian-Herzegovinian international footballer Vedad Ibišević.
