= Juan Sánchez (soccer, born 1997) =

American soccer player (born 1997)

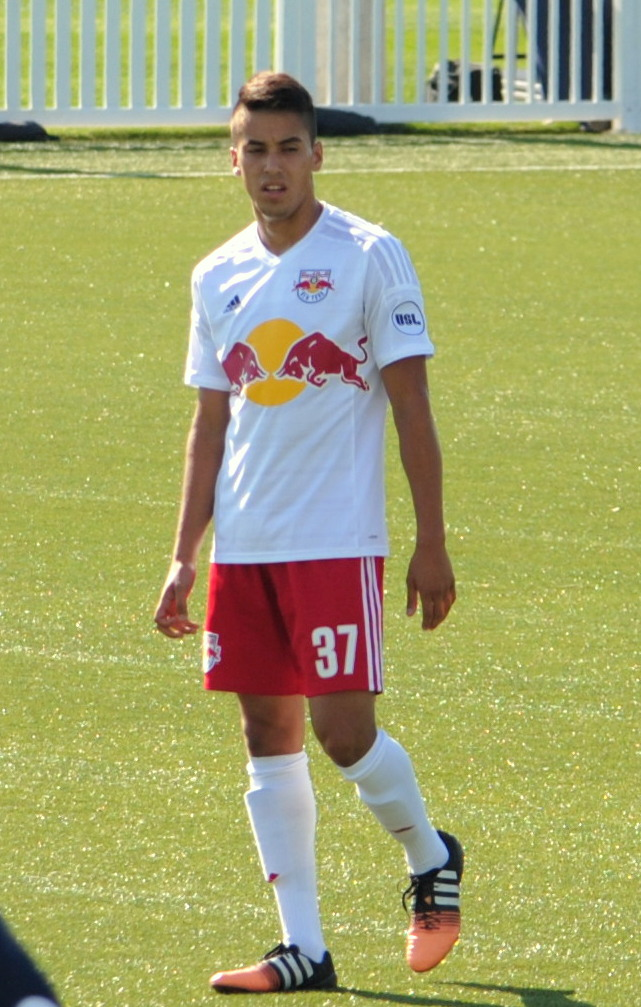

Personal information
- Full name: Juan Sebastián Sánchez
- Date of birth: June 29, 1997 (age 29)
- Place of birth: Lima, Peru
- Height: 1.78 m (5 ft 10 in)
- Position: Forward

Youth career
- Munay Soccer Academy
- 2014–2015: New York Red Bulls

College career
Years	Team	Apps	(Gls)
2015–2018	Tulsa Golden Hurricane	64	(15)

Senior career*
Years	Team	Apps	(Gls)
2015	New York Red Bulls II	12	(1)

International career
2014	United States U18		
- * Club domestic league appearances and goals as of November 2, 2018

Juan Sebastián Sánchez (born June 29, 1997) is an American soccer player who plays as a forward.

== Career ==
=== Early career ===
Born in Peru, Sánchez moved to the United States when he was eleven years old. He joined the local club side, Munay Soccer Academy, where he played for three years. He then joined the New York Red Bulls academy side. During the 2014/15 season Sánchez led the Red Bulls U17/U18's with 17 goals in 21 matches. Despite appearing for NYRB II, Sánchez was able to maintain his college eligibility and joined the Tulsa Golden Hurricane in August 2015.

=== USL ===
On January 27, 2015, it was announced that Sánchez would be a part of the Red Bulls first-team pre-season camp in Florida. Then, on March 27, it was announced that he would be a part of the New York Red Bulls II side that would play in the United Soccer League, the third-tier of soccer in the United States. Sánchez then made his debut for the Red Bulls II the next day against the Rochester Rhinos. He came on as a 79th-minute substitute as the Red Bulls II drew the game 0–0. On July 25, 2015, Sánchez scored his first goal for Red Bulls II in a 4–3 victory over Richmond Kickers.

=== International ===
Despite being born in Peru, Sánchez has been called up to the United States U18 team.

== Career statistics ==
As of May 24, 2015

Club	Season	League			League Cup		Domestic Cup		International		Total	
Club	Season	Division	Apps	Goals	Apps	Goals	Apps	Goals	Apps	Goals	Apps	Goals
New York Red Bulls II	2015	USL	12	1	0	0	1	0	—	—	13	1
Career total			12	1	0	0	1	0	0	0	13	1
