= Ray Saari =

American soccer player (born 1995)

Personal information
- Date of birth: April 18, 1995 (age 31)
- Place of birth: Kansas City, Missouri, United States
- Height: 5 ft 6 in (1.68 m)
- Position: Midfielder

Youth career
- 2009–2013: Billy Goat FC

College career
Years	Team	Apps	(Gls)
2013–2016	Tulsa Golden Hurricane	69	(12)

Senior career*
Years	Team	Apps	(Gls)
2013	Houston Dutch Lions	9	(0)
2014–2016	Tulsa Athletic	27	(12)
2017–2018	Seattle Sounders FC 2	39	(4)
2017	Kansas City Comets (indoor)	2	(0)
2019	Sacramento Republic	19	(0)
2019–2020	Kansas City Comets (indoor)	12	(6)
2020–2021	Oklahoma City Energy	3	(0)

Managerial career
- 2022–2023: Tulsa Golden Hurricane (assistant)
- * Club domestic league appearances and goals as of December 16, 2022

Ray Saari (born April 18, 1995) is an American professional soccer executive and former player. He is currently sporting director for USL League One team Portland Hearts of Pine.

== Early life ==
Saari was raised in the Kansas City area and attended Oak Park High School. He was diagnosed with testicular cancer at the age of 15 and underwent several months of chemotherapy before returning to the high school's soccer team.

== Playing career ==
=== College ===
Saari spent his entire college career at the University of Tulsa. He was a starter all four years. He made a total of 69 appearances, and tallied 12 goals and 12 assists. His sophomore season he was named to the American Athletic Conference All-conference team. In his senior season despite missing five matches, Saari finished as the team's second leading scorer and earned a spot on the NSCAA All-East region first team.

Saari spent three seasons with NPSL side Tulsa Athletic, playing a pivotal role in winning conference titles in two of his three seasons there. His advanced attacking role with the club yielded nearly a point a game and showcased his creative ability in the final third. Saari is among the all-time point leaders at the club registering 12 goals and 13 assists.

He also played in the Premier Development League for Houston Dutch Lions.

=== Professional ===
On March 22, 2017, Saari signed his first professional soccer contract, joining USL club Seattle Sounders FC 2. He made his professional debut four days later in a 2–1 defeat to Sacramento Republic. On September 13, 2018, Saari was released from Seattle Sounders FC 2 having played in 39 matches over two seasons for S2 and recording four goals and six assists.

On January 3, 2019, Saari joined USL Championship side Sacramento Republic FC.

On November 12, 2019, Saari returned to the Kansas City area and signed a contract with the Kansas City Comets of the Major Arena Soccer League.

Saari signed with USL Championship club OKC Energy FC on February 3, 2020.

== Coaching and executive career ==
After retiring from playing, Saari became an assistant coach with the Tulsa Golden Hurricane men's soccer team, a role he would hold for two seasons. He would join El Paso Locomotive FC of the USL Championship in 2023 as an assistant coach, before becoming the club's technical director in 2024.

On August 31, 2026, Saari was announced as sporting director for USL League One club Portland Hearts of Pine.
