= 2022 Pac-12 Conference men's soccer season =

- League: NCAA Division I
- Sport: Soccer
- Duration: August 25 – December 11, 2022
- Teams: 6

2023 MLS SuperDraft
- Top draft pick: Ilijah Paul, Washington
- Picked by: Real Salt Lake, 7th overall

Regular season
- Champions: Washington
- Runners-up: Stanford
- Season MVP: Joran Gerbet, Oregon State

Pac-12 Conference men's soccer seasons
- ← 2021 2023 →

2022 Pac-12 Conference men's soccer standings
	Conf.					Overall
Team	W		L		T	W		L		T
No. 11 Washington†	7	–	1	–	2	15	–	2	–	3
No. 7 Stanford+	4	–	2	–	4	12	–	2	–	6
Oregon State+	3	–	1	–	5	7	–	4	–	6
UCLA+	4	–	4	–	1	12	–	7	–	1
San Diego State	1	–	6	–	3	5	–	9	–	4
California	1	–	6	–	3	3	–	8	–	6
† – Conference champion + – At-large invitation to the 2022 NCAA tournament; As of December 13, 2022; Rankings from United Soccer Coaches; Source: Pac-12

The 2022 Pac-12 Conference men's soccer season is the 23rd season of men's varsity soccer sponsored by the Pac-12 Conference. Part of the 2022 NCAA Division I men's soccer season, the Pac-12 will begin play in August 2022 and conclude in November 2022.

Oregon State are the defending Pac-12 champions.

== Teams ==
=== Stadiums and Locations ===
Team	Location	Stadium	Capacity
California Golden Bears	Berkeley, California	Edwards Stadium	22,000
California Golden Bears	Berkeley, California	Witter Rugby Field	5,000
Oregon State Beavers	Corvallis, Oregon	Lorenz Field	2,200
San Diego State Aztecs (Note: San Diego State's primary conference is the Mountain West Conference, but the program has competed in the Pac-12 Conference as an affiliate member since 2005.)	San Diego, California	SDSU Sports Deck	3,000
Stanford Cardinal	Stanford, California	Cagan Stadium	4,000
UCLA Bruins	Los Angeles, California	Wallis Annenberg Stadium	3,000
Washington Huskies	Seattle, Washington	Husky Soccer Stadium	1,640

== Preseason ==
=== Recruiting classes ===
Rankings
Team	TDS	CSN	Signees
California			
Oregon State			
San Diego State	1		
Stanford			
UCLA			
Washington			

=== Preseason Coaches polls ===
The preseason polls will be released on August 16, 2022. Oregon State and Washington were voted to be co-champions. Below are the results of the media poll with total points received next to each school and first-place votes in parentheses.

Predicted finish	Team	Votes (1st place)
T−1	Oregon State	21 (2)
T−1	Washington	21 (1)
3	UCLA	18 (2)
4	Stanford	14 (1)
5	San Diego State	10
6	California	6

=== Preseason awards ===
==== All−American teams ====
USC 1st Team	USC 2nd Team	TDS 1st Team	TDS 2nd Team	CSN 1st Team	CSN 2nd Team

==== Preseason All Pac-12 ====
First Team

Second Team

All Pac–12 Honorable Mention (received votes from four or more members of the media):

- California:
- Oregon State:
- San Diego State:
- Stanford:
- UCLA:
- Washington:

=== Preseason exhibitions ===
Date	Time	Visiting team	Home team	Site	TV	Result	Attendance	Ref.
August 12	7:30 p.m.	Corban	No. 5 Oregon State	Lorenz Field • Corvallis, OR		W 1–0		
August 12	7:30 p.m.	California	UC Riverside	UCR Soccer Stadium • Riverside, CA		W 4–0		
August 14	6:00 p.m.	San Diego State	UC Irvine	Anteater Stadium • Irvine, CA		T 2–2		
August 14	7:30 p.m.	California	Cal State Bakersfield	Main Soccer Field • Bakersfield, CA		W 1–0		
August 15	6:00 p.m.	No. 5 Oregon State	Portland	Merlo Field • Portland, OR		L 0–4		
August 15	7:30 p.m.	Westmont	No. 23 UCLA	Wallis Annenberg Stadium • Los Angeles, CA		W 2–0		
August 19	1:00 p.m.	Pacific	California	Edwards Stadium • Berkeley, CA	P12N	W 2–1		
August 19	2:00 p.m.	No. 5 Oregon State	Seattle U	Championship Field • Seattle, WA		L 0–3		
August 19	7:00 p.m.	Cal Baptist	San Diego State	SDSU Sports Deck • San Diego, CA		T 2–2		
August 19	6:00 p.m.	No. 3 Washington	Portland	Merlo Field • Portland, OR		L 0–2		
August 20	7:00 p.m.	San Francisco	Stanford	Cagan Stadium • Stanford, CA		W 2–0		
August 20	7:30 p.m.	UNLV	No. 23 UCLA	Wallis Annenberg Stadium • Los Angeles, CA		T 0–0		
^{#}Rankings from United Soccer Coaches. All times are in Pacific Time.

== Head coaches ==
=== Coaching changes ===
There was one coaching change ahead of the 2022 season. California head coach, Kevin Grimes, retired at the end of the 2021 season. Grimes was replaced by Leonard Griffin, who had previously coached Grand Canyon University.

=== Coaches ===
Note: All stats current through the completion of the 2021 season

Team	Head coach	Years at school	Overall record	Record at school	Pac–12 record
California	Leonard Griffin	1	22–22–4	0–0–0	0–0–0
Oregon State	Terry Boss	5	49–29–9	49–29–9	28–17–5
San Diego State	Ryan Hopkins	3	204–106–38	9–14–4	3–14–2
Stanford	Jeremy Gunn	11	283–90–54	96–29–23	45–14–11
UCLA	Ryan Jorden	4	108–82–20	17–22–6	7–16–5
Washington	Jamie Clark	12	184–67–25	145–52–22	70–29–11

== Regular season ==
Index to colors and formatting
Pac-12 member won
Pac-12 member lost
Pac-12 member tied
Pac-12 teams in **bold**

All times Pacific time.

=== Conference results ===
Each team plays every other conference team twice; once home and once away.

Home \ Away	CAL	OSU	SDSU	STA	UCLA	UW
California	—	Oct 30	Sep 15	Nov 10	Sep 18	Oct 27
Oregon State	Oct 6	—	Nov 3	Oct 9	Nov 6	Oct 21
San Diego State	Oct 23	Oct 2	—	Oct 20	Nov 11	Sep 29
Stanford	Sep 29	Oct 27	Sep 18	—	Sep 15	Oct 30
UCLA	Oct 20	Sep 29	Oct 7	Oct 23	—	Oct 2
Washington	Oct 9	Nov 10	Nov 6	Oct 6	Nov 3	—

Source: Pac-12 Conference
Legend: Blue = home team win; Yellow = draw; Red = away team win.
For upcoming matches, an "a" indicates there is an article about the rivalry between the two participants.

=== Positions by round ===
Team ╲ Round	1	2	3	4	5	6	7	8	9	10
Washington										
Stanford										
California										
Oregon State										
UCLA										
San Diego State										

Leader and 2022 NCAA Division I Men's Soccer tournament

Source: Pac-12.com

=== Schedule ===
==== Week 1 (Aug 22–28) ====
Date	Time	Visiting team	Home team	Site	TV	Result	Attendance	Ref.
August 25	6:00 p.m.	UC Davis	No. 5 **Oregon State**	Lorenz Field • Corvallis, OR	Oregon State Live Stream 3	**W** 2–1	629	
August 25	7:00 p.m.	UC Irvine	No. 23 **UCLA**	Wallis Annenberg Stadium • Los Angeles, CA	P12N	**W** 1–0	745	
August 25	7:00 p.m.	**California**	Cal State Fullerton	Titan Stadium • Fullerton, CA		**L** 1–3	735	
August 25	7:00 p.m.	**San Diego State**	CSUN	Matador Soccer Field • Northridge, CA	ESPN+	**L** 1–2	507	
August 25	7:30 p.m.	Sacramento State	No. 3 **Washington**	Husky Soccer Stadium • Seattle, WA	Washington Live Stream-2	**W** 3–0	1,097	
August 25	7:00 p.m.	Villanova	**Stanford**	Cagan Stadium • Stanford, CA	Pac-12 Insider	**W** 1–0	545	
August 28	1:00 p.m.	Villanova	**California**	Edwards Stadium • Berkeley, CA		**T** 1–1	450	
August 28	7:00 p.m.	Loyola Marymount	**San Diego State**	SDSU Sports Deck • San Diego, CA		**L** 1–2		
August 28	7:00 p.m.	No. 17 Virginia Tech	No. 19 **UCLA**	Wallis Annenberg Stadium • Los Angeles, CA	P12N	**W** 1–0	515	
August 28	7:00 p.m.	No. 14 SMU	**Stanford**	Cagan Stadium • Stanford, CA	Stanford Live Stream	**W** 3–1	753	
^{#}Rankings from United Soccer Coaches. All times are in Pacific Time.

==== Week 2 (Aug 29–Sep 4) ====
Date	Time	Visiting team	Home team	Site	TV	Result	Attendance	Ref.
August 29	6:00 p.m.	Utah Valley	No. 5 **Oregon State**	Lorenz Field • Corvallis, OR	P12N	**T** 0–0	517	
August 29	7:30 p.m.	Central Arkansas	No. 3 **Washington**	Husky Soccer Stadium • Seattle, WA	Pac-12 Insider	**W** 2–1	953	
September 1	3:00 p.m.	UC Davis	No. 3 **Stanford**	Cagan Stadium • Stanford, CA	P12N	**W** 3–0	456	
September 2	5:00 p.m.	**San Diego State**	Omaha	Caniglia Field • Omaha, NE		**L** 0–1	303	
September 2	6:00 p.m.	Seton Hall	No. 10 **Oregon State**	Lorenz Field • Corvallis, OR	Oregon State Live Stream-3	**L** 0–1	495	
September 2	7:00 p.m.	**California**	UC Irvine	Anteater Stadium • Irvine, CA		**T** 1–1	543	
September 2	7:00 p.m.	Liberty	No. 4 **UCLA**	Wallis Annenberg Stadium • Los Angeles, CA	UCLA Live Steam-2	**W** 5–2	553	
September 2	7:30 p.m.	Utah Valley	No. 8 **Washington**	Husky Soccer Stadium • Seattle, WA	Washington Live Stream-2	**W** 4–1	879	
September 4	3:00 p.m.	San Jose State	No. 3 **Stanford**	Cagan Stadium • Stanford, CA (Rivalry)	P12N	**W** 4–0	1,672	
September 4	7:00 p.m.	**California**	UC San Diego	Triton Soccer Stadium • San Diego, CA		**T** 1–1	550	
^{#}Rankings from United Soccer Coaches. All times are in Pacific Time.

==== Week 3 (Sep 5–11) ====
Date	Time	Visiting team	Home team	Site	TV	Result	Attendance	Ref.
September 5	4:30 p.m.	**San Diego State**	No. 7 Creighton	Morrison Stadium • Omaha, NE	BEDN	**T** 2–2	1,178	
September 5	7:00 p.m.	Grand Canyon	No. 3 **UCLA**	Wallis Annenberg Stadium • Los Angeles, CA	P12N	**L** 2–3	449	
September 6	4:00 p.m.	No. 3 **Washington**	South Florida	Corbett Stadium • Tampa, FL	ESPN+	**W** 3–0	526	
September 9	7:00 p.m.	UNLV	**San Diego State**	SDSU Sports Deck • San Diego, CA		**W** 5–0	311	
September 9	7:00 p.m.	**Oregon State**	UC Santa Barbara	Harder Stadium • Santa Barbara, CA	ESPN+	**L** 1–3	629	
September 9	5:30 p.m.	No. 2 **Stanford**	Creighton	Morrison Stadium • Omaha, NE	BEDN	**T** 1–1	4,136	
September 10	1:00 p.m.	Cal Baptist	**California**	Edwards Stadium • Berkeley, CA		**W** 1–1	177	
September 10	7:00 p.m.	No. 15 **UCLA**	Portland	Merlo Field • Portland, OR		**L** 0–2	1,625	
September 11	3:00 p.m.	Denver	**San Diego State**	SDSU Sports Deck • San Diego, CA		**W** 2–1		
September 11	3:00 p.m.	Air Force	No. 3 **Washington**	Husky Soccer Stadium • Seattle, WA	P12N	**T** 1–1	891	
^{#}Rankings from United Soccer Coaches. All times are in Pacific Time.

==== Week 4 (Sep 12–18) ====
Date	Time	Visiting team	Home team	Site	TV	Result	Attendance	Ref.
September 15	4:00 p.m.	**San Diego State**	**California**	Edwards Stadium • Berkeley, CA	P12N	**CAL** 2–0	345	
September 15	6:00 p.m.	No. 25 **UCLA**	No. 2т **Stanford**	Cagan Stadium • Stanford, CA	P12N	**T** 0–0	1,380	
September 16	7:00 p.m.	Michigan State	**Washington**	Husky Soccer Stadium • Seattle, WA	P12N	**W** 4–1	1,525	
September 18	4:00 p.m.	No. 25 **UCLA**	**California**	Edwards Stadium • Berkeley, CA (Rivalry)	P12N	**UCLA** 2–1	487	
September 18	6:00 p.m.	**San Diego State**	No. 2 **Stanford**	Cagan Stadium • Stanford, CA	P12N	**T** 0–0	893	
^{#}Rankings from United Soccer Coaches. All times are in Pacific Time.

==== Week 5 (Sep 19–25) ====
Date	Time	Visiting team	Home team	Site	TV	Result	Attendance	Ref.
September 20	6:00 p.m.	**Oregon State**	No. 11 Denver	CIBER Field • Denver, CO		**W** 2–1	485	
September 20	7:00 p.m.	Seattle U	No. 2 **Washington**	Husky Soccer Stadium • Seattle, WA (Seattle Cup)	P12N	**W** 4–0	3,876	
September 24	7:00 p.m.	UC San Diego	**San Diego State**	SDSU Sports Deck • San Diego, CA		**W** 1–0	432	
September 24	7:00 p.m.	Cal State Fullerton	No. 20 **UCLA**	Wallis Annenberg Stadium • Los Angeles, CA	UCLA Live Stream-2	**W** 1–0	1,174	
September 24	7:00 p.m.	No. 5 **Stanford**	Santa Barbara	Harder Stadium • Santa Barbara, CA	ESPN+	**W** 2–1	3,174	
September 24	7:30 p.m.	No. 2 **Washington**	Grand Canyon	GCU Stadium • Phoenix, AZ	ESPN+	**W** 4–1		
September 25	1:00 p.m.	Saint Mary's (CA)	**California**	Edwards Stadium • Berkeley, CA		**W** 1–0	468	
^{#}Rankings from United Soccer Coaches. All times are in Pacific Time.

==== Week 6 (Sep 26–Oct 2) ====
Date	Time	Visiting team	Home team	Site	TV	Result	Attendance	Ref.
September 29	6:00 p.m.	**Oregon State**	No. 21 **UCLA**	Wallis Annenberg Stadium • Los Angeles, CA	P12N	**OSU** 1–0	694	
September 29	7:30 p.m.	**Washington**	**San Diego State**	Snapdragon Stadium • San Diego, CA		**WASH** 2–0	2,769	
September 29	8:00 p.m.	**California**	No. 6 **Stanford**	Cagan Stadium • Stanford, CA (72nd Big Clásico)	P12N	**STAN** 5–1	1,900	
October 2	3:00 p.m.	**Oregon State**	**San Diego State**	SDSU Sports Deck • San Diego, CA		**SDSU** 3–0	211	
October 2	4:00 p.m.	No. 2 **Washington**	No. 21 **UCLA**	Wallis Annenberg Stadium • Los Angeles, CA	P12N	**WASH** 1–0	1,081	
^{#}Rankings from United Soccer Coaches. All times are in Pacific Time.

==== Week 7 (Oct 3–9) ====
Date	Time	Visiting team	Home team	Site	TV	Result	Attendance	Ref.
October 6	6:00 p.m.	**California**	**Oregon State**	Lorenz Field • Corvallis, OR		**T** 1–1	808	
October 6	7:30 p.m.	No. 5 **Stanford**	No. 1 **Washington**	Husky Soccer Stadium • Seattle, WA	P12N	**WASH** 1–0	2,953	
October 7	7:00 p.m.	**San Diego State**	**UCLA**	Wallis Annenberg Stadium • Los Angeles, CA	P12NLA	**UCLA** 2–0	978	
October 9	12:00 p.m.	No. 5 **Stanford**	**Oregon State**	Lorenz Field • Corvallis, OR	P12N	**T** 2–2	887	
October 9	2:00 p.m.	**California**	No. 1 **Washington**	Husky Soccer Stadium • Seattle, WA	P12N	**WASH** 1–0	1,954	
^{#}Rankings from United Soccer Coaches. All times are in Pacific Time.

==== Week 8 (Oct 10–16) ====
Date	Time	Visiting team	Home team	Site	TV	Result	Attendance	Ref.
October 14	4:00 p.m.	Gonzaga	No. 1 **Washington**	Husky Soccer Stadium • Seattle, WA	P12N	**W** 1–0		
October 14	7:00 p.m.	**UCLA**	Loyola Marymount	Sullivan Field • Los Angeles, CA		**W** 2–0	1,160	
October 15	7:00 p.m.	Portland	**Oregon State**	Lorenz Field • Corvallis, OR	P12N	**W** 3–2	912	
October 15	1:00 p.m.	San Francisco	**California**	Edwards Stadium • Berkeley, CA		**L** 1–5	476	
October 15	7:00 p.m.	San Diego	**San Diego State**	SDSU Sports Deck • San Diego, CA		**W** 4–2	319	
October 15	1:00 p.m.	No. 9 **Stanford**	Saint Mary's (CA)	Saint Mary's Stadium • Moraga, CA		**W** 2–0	556	
^{#}Rankings from United Soccer Coaches. All times are in Pacific Time.

==== Week 9 (Oct 17–23) ====
Date	Time	Visiting team	Home team	Site	TV	Result	Attendance	Ref.
October 20	7:30 p.m.	**California**	**UCLA**	Wallis Annenberg Stadium • Los Angeles, CA (Rivalry)	P12N	**UCLA** 1–0	1,179	
October 20	7:00 p.m.	No. 5 **Stanford**	**San Diego State**	SDSU Sports Deck • San Diego, CA	Aztec Digital Network	**STAN** 3–2	382	
October 21	6:00 p.m.	No. 1 **Washington**	**Oregon State**	Lorenz Field • Corvallis, OR	P12N	**T** 1–1	1,258	
October 23	3:00 p.m.	No. 5 **Stanford**	**UCLA**	Wallis Annenberg Stadium • Los Angeles, CA	P12N	**STAN** 1–0	1,657	
October 23	3:00 p.m.	**California**	**San Diego State**	SDSU Sports Deck • San Diego, CA		**T** 2–2	360	
^{#}Rankings from United Soccer Coaches. All times are in Pacific Time.

==== Week 10 (Oct 24–30) ====
Date	Time	Visiting team	Home team	Site	TV	Result	Attendance	Ref.
October 27	3:00 p.m.	No. 1 **Washington**	**California**	Edwards Stadium • Berkeley, CA	P12N	**WASH** 2–1	489	
October 27	8:00 p.m.	**Oregon State**	No. 5 **Stanford**	Cagan Stadium • Stanford, CA	P12N	**OSU** 2–1	679	
October 29	10:00 a.m.	**UCLA**	Rutgers	Yurcak Field • Piscataway, NJ	BTN+	**W** 1–0	824	
October 30	12:00 p.m.	**Oregon State**	**California**	Edwards Stadium • Berkeley, CA		**T** 1–1	455	
October 30	4:00 p.m.	No. 1 **Washington**	No. 5 **Stanford**	Cagan Stadium • Stanford, CA	P12N	**T** 3–3	2,156	
^{#}Rankings from United Soccer Coaches. All times are in Pacific Time.

==== Week 11 (Oct 31–Nov 6) ====
Date	Time	Visiting team	Home team	Site	TV	Result	Attendance	Ref.
November 3	6:00 p.m.	**San Diego State**	**Oregon State**	Lorenz Field • Corvallis, OR	P12N	**T** 2–2	718	
November 3	8:00 p.m.	**UCLA**	No. 1 **Washington**	Husky Soccer Stadium • Seattle, WA	P12N	**WASH** 3–2	1,030	
November 6	12:00 p.m.	**San Diego State**	**Washington**	Husky Soccer Stadium • Seattle, WA	P12N	**WASH** 3–0	1,582	
November 6	2:00 p.m.	**UCLA**	**Oregon State**	Lorenz Field • Corvallis, OR		Canceled		
November 7	5:30 p.m.	Pacific	**Stanford**	Cagan Stadium • Stanford, CA	P12 Insider	**W** 7–0	998	
^{#}Rankings from United Soccer Coaches. All times are in Pacific Time.

==== Week 12 (Nov 7–13) ====
Date	Time	Visiting team	Home team	Site	TV	Result	Attendance	Ref.
November 10	TBD	**Stanford**	**California**	Edwards Stadium • Berkeley, CA (73rd Big Clásico)	P12N Bay Area	**STAN** 1–0	1,290	
November 10	6:00 p.m.	**Oregon State**	**Washington**	Husky Soccer Stadium • Seattle, WA	P12N	**OSU** 1–0	1,945	
November 11	7:00 p.m.	**UCLA**	**San Diego State**	SDSU Sports Deck • San Diego, CA		**UCLA** 2–1	608	
^{#}Rankings from United Soccer Coaches. All times are in Pacific Time.

== Postseason ==
=== NCAA tournament ===
The Pac-12 had four teams receive a bid to the 2022 NCAA tournament, three of the teams were seeded.

Seed	School	First round	2nd Round	3rd Round	Quarterfinals	Semifinals	Championship
2	Washington	BYE	L 1–3 vs. Creighton – (Seattle, WA)				
5	Stanford	BYE	W 6–2 High Point – (Stanford, CA)	T 1–1 (5–6 PKs) No. 12 UNC Greensboro – (Stanford, CA)			
8	Oregon State	BYE	L 0–2 Portland – (Corvallis, OR)				
	UCLA	W 2–1 California Baptist – (Los Angeles, CA)	W 2–1 at Clemson – (Clemson, SC)	L 0–3 at Vermont – (Burlington, VT)			
	W–L–T (%):	1–0–0 (1.000)	2–2–0 (.500)	0–1–1 (.250)	0–0–0 (–)	0–0–0 (–)	0–0–0 (–) Total: 3–3–1 (.500)

== Rankings ==
=== National rankings ===
	Improvement in ranking
	Drop in ranking
RV	Received votes but were not ranked in Top 25
NV	No votes received

		Pre	Wk 1	Wk 2	Wk 3	Wk 4	Wk 5	Wk 6	Wk 7	Wk 8	Wk 9	Wk 10	Wk 11	Wk 12	Wk 13	Wk 14	Wk 15	Wk 16	Final
California	USC	NV													None released				
California	TDS	NV																	
California	CSN	NV																	
Oregon State	USC	5	5	10											None released				
Oregon State	TDS	5	5	3	15								16						
Oregon State	CSN	6	5	16								RV							
San Diego State	USC	NV													None released				
San Diego State	TDS	NV																	
San Diego State	CSN	NV																	
Stanford	USC	RV	3	2	2т	5т	6	5	9	5	5	6			None released				
Stanford	TDS	NV	RV	RV	23	20	19	9	9	14	5	5	7						
Stanford	CSN	NV	NV	6	6	9	7	6	9	7	6	7							
UCLA	USC	23	4	15	25	20	21		RV	RV		RV			None released				
UCLA	TDS	20	20	14	6	14	15	14	25										
UCLA	CSN	23	15	9	RV	26	23	RV	RV	RV	RV	RV							
Washington	USC	3	8	3	4	2	2	1 (5)	1 (6)	1 (6)	1 (5)	1 (6)			None released				
Washington	TDS	2	2	2	4	2	2	1	1	1	1	1							
Washington	CSN	2	2	2	3	2	2	1	1	1	1	1							

=== Regional rankings - USC Far West Region ===
	Improvement in ranking
	Drop in ranking
RV	Received votes but were not ranked in Top 10
NV	No votes received

The United Soccer Coaches' Far West region ranks teams across the Pac-12, Big West, and WAC.

	Wk 1	Wk 2	Wk 3	Wk 4	Wk 5	Wk 6	Wk 7	Wk 8	Wk 9	Wk 10	Wk 11	Wk 12
California												
Oregon State	3	5				5	5	5	5	4		
San Diego State			9									
Stanford	1	1	1	2	2	2	2	2	2	2		
UCLA	2	3	4	3	3	6	3	3	4	3		
Washington	4	2	2	1	1	1	1	1	1	1		

== Awards and honors ==
=== Player of the week honors ===
Following each week's games, Pac-12 conference officials select the player of the week.

Week	Player	School	Pos.	Ref.
Aug. 26	Christian Soto	Washington	MF	
Sep. 5	Ilijah Paul	Washington	F	
Sep. 12	Elias Katsaros	San Diego State	D	
Sep. 19	Iljah Paul	Washington	F	
Sep. 26	Javier Armas	Oregon State	MF	
Oct. 3	Will Reilly	Stanford	MF	
Oct. 10	Lucas Meek	Washington	MF	
Oct. 17	Clarence Awoudor	Oregon State	F	
Oct. 24	Shane de Flores	Stanford	MF	
Oct. 31	Gio Miglietti	Washington	D/F	
Nov. 7	Imanol Rosales	Washington	MF	
Nov. 14	Joran Gerbet	Oregon State	MF	

=== Postseason honors ===
==== Conference honors ====
2022 Pac-12 Men's Soccer Individual Awards
Award	Recipient(s)
Player of the Year	Joran Gerbet – Oregon State
Defensive Player of the Year	Keegan Hughes – Stanford
Coach of the Year	Jamie Clark – Washington
Freshman of the Year	CJ Fodrey – San Diego State

2022 Pac-12 Men's Soccer All-Conference Teams
First Team Honorees	Second Team Honorees	Honorable Mention
Clarence Awoudor – Washington; Cam Cilley – Stanford; CJ Fodrey – San Diego State; Joran Gerbet – Oregon State; Keegan Hughes – Stanford; Kalani Kossa-Rienzi – Washington; Lucas Meek – Washington; Ilijah Paul – Washington; Nick Scardina – Washington; Christian Soto – Washington; Mouhameth Thiam – Oregon State	Nonso Adimabua – California; Javier Armas – Oregon State; Blake Bowen – San Diego State; Jacob Castro – San Diego State; Gael Gibert – Oregon State; Nate Jones – Washington; Wyatt Meyer – California; Gio Miglietti – Washington; Tommy Silva – UCLA; Jose Sosa – UCLA; Keegan Tingey – Stanford	Jose Contell – UCLA; Nate Crockbord – UCLA; Shane de Flores – Stanford; Kevin Diaz – UCLA; Pietro Grassi – UCLA; Fahmi Ibrahim – California; Nicklas Lund – Oregon State; Chris Meyers – Washington; Imanol Rosales – Washington; Iñigo Villaldea – San Diego State; Dante Williams – Oregon State

==== National honors ====
USC 1st Team	USC 2nd Team	TDS 1st Team	TDS 2nd Team	CSN 1st Team	CSN 2nd Team

== MLS SuperDraft ==
=== Draft picks ===
Round	Pick #	MLS team	Player	Position	College
1	7	Real Salt Lake	Ilijah Paul	FW	Washington
1	13	Austin FC	CJ Fodrey	FW	San Diego State
2	40	Charlotte FC	Nick Scardina	FW	Washington
3	59	Seattle Sounders FC	Blake Bowen	DF	San Diego State

=== Homegrown contracts ===
Original MLS team	Player	Position	College	Notes
Seattle Sounders FC	Jacob Castro	GK	San Diego State	
