= 2023 Pac-12 Conference men's soccer season =

- League: NCAA Division I
- Sport: Soccer
- Duration: August 24 – December 10, 2023
- Teams: 6

2024 MLS SuperDraft
- Top draft pick: Logan Farrington, Oregon State
- Picked by: FC Dallas

Regular season
- Season MVP: Logan Farrington, Oregon State
- Top scorer: Logan Farrington, Oregon State
- Finals champions: UCLA
- Runners-up: Oregon State

Pac-12 Conference men's soccer seasons
- ← 2022 2026 →

2023 Pac-12 Conference men's soccer standings
	Conf.					Overall
Team	W		L		T	W		L		T
No. 21 UCLA †	6	–	0	–	4	9	–	4	–	5
No. 4 Oregon State +	4	–	1	–	5	11	–	6	–	5
California	3	–	4	–	3	7	–	6	–	5
No. 5 Stanford +	3	–	2	–	5	11	–	4	–	5
Washington	2	–	4	–	4	5	–	6	–	7
San Diego State	0	–	7	–	3	6	–	7	–	5
† – Conference champion + – At-large invitation to the 2023 NCAA tournament; As of December 12, 2023; Rankings from United Soccer Coaches; Source: Pac-12

The 2023 Pac-12 Conference men's soccer season was the 24th season of men's varsity soccer in the conference, and the last before Pac-12 men's soccer went on a two-season hiatus. Part of the 2023 NCAA Division I men's soccer season, the Pac-12 began play in August 2023 and concluded in November 2023.

The champions for the 2023 season were UCLA, winning its 31st overall conference championship, and its ninth Pac-12 title. By being champions, UCLA earned the conference's automatic berth into the 2023 NCAA Division I men's soccer tournament. Oregon State and Stanford earned at-large bids into the tournament.

Oregon State striker Logan Farrington was the conference's top scorer of the 2023 season, with 15 goals, securing him the title of Pac-12 Conference Men's Soccer Player of the Year. Additionally, Farrington was the first Pac-12 player drafted in the 2024 MLS SuperDraft, being drafted by FC Dallas with the third overall pick.

The 2023 season was the final season in the Pac-12 for California, Stanford, UCLA, and Washington. The two former schools departied for the Atlantic Coast Conference while the two latter schools will be departing for the Big Ten Conference, both of which sponsor men's soccer.

The remaining Pac-12 men's soccer schools were Oregon State and San Diego State. Oregon State joined the West Coast Conference, while San Diego State joined the Western Athletic Conference as affiliate members.

Pac-12 men's soccer will resume in 2026, with legacy full member Oregon State, plus incoming full members Gonzaga and San Diego State, joined by four new affiliates from the Big West Conference.

== Teams ==
=== Stadiums and Locations ===
Team	Location	Stadium	Capacity
California Golden Bears	Berkeley, California	Edwards Stadium	22,000
California Golden Bears	Berkeley, California	Witter Rugby Field	5,000
Oregon State Beavers	Corvallis, Oregon	Lorenz Field	2,200
San Diego State Aztecs (Note: San Diego State's primary conference is the Mountain West Conference, but the program has competed in the Pac-12 Conference as an affiliate member since 2005.)	San Diego, California	SDSU Sports Deck	3,000
Stanford Cardinal	Stanford, California	Cagan Stadium	4,000
UCLA Bruins	Los Angeles, California	Wallis Annenberg Stadium	3,000
Washington Huskies	Seattle, Washington	Husky Soccer Stadium	1,640

== Head coaches ==
=== Coaching changes ===
There was one coaching change ahead of the 2022 season. Oregon State head coach, Terry Boss, resigned at the end of the 2022 season to pursue professional level coaching. Boss was replaced by Greg Dalby, who had previously served as an assistant coach at Penn State University.

=== Coaches ===
Note: All stats current through the completion of the 2022 season

Team	Head coach	Years at school	Overall record	Record at school	Pac–12 record
California	Leonard Griffin	2	3–8–6 (.353)	3–8–6 (.353)	1–6–3 (.250)
Oregon State	Greg Dalby	1	0–0–0 (–)	0–0–0 (–)	0–0–0 (–)
San Diego State	Ryan Hopkins	4	209–115–42 (.628)	14–23–8 (.400)	4–20–3 (.204)
Stanford	Jeremy Gunn	12	337–108–88 (.715)	150–65–46 (.663)	71–26–23 (.688)
UCLA	Ryan Jorden	5	120–89–21 (.567)	29–29–8 (.500)	11–20–6 (.378)
Washington	Jamie Clark	13	199–69–28 (.720)	160–54–25 (.722)	77–30–13 (.696)

== Preseason ==
=== Preseason Coaches polls ===
The preseason polls was released on August 21, 2023. Washington was voted the preseason favorite to win the Pac-12 championship. Below are the results of the media poll with total points received next to each school and first-place votes in parentheses.

Predicted finish	Team	Votes (1st place)
1	Washington	23 (4)
2	Stanford	21 (1)
3	UCLA	17 (1)
4	Oregon State	15
5	California	8
6	San Diego State	6

== Regular season ==
Index to colors and formatting
Pac-12 member won
Pac-12 member lost
Pac-12 member tied
Pac-12 teams in **bold**

All times Pacific time.

=== Conference results ===
Each team plays every other conference team twice; once home and once away.

Home \ Away	CAL	OSU	SDSU	STA	UCLA	UW
California	—	2–2	1–0	1–1	1–1	0–1
Oregon State	1–0	—	2–2	0–4	2–2	2–2
San Diego State	0–1	0–1	—	0–0	0–3	1–1
Stanford	2–1	1–2	5–0	—	1–3	1–1
UCLA	2–1	0–0	2–1	2–2	—	1–0
Washington	1–2	0–2	3–1	1–1	2–4	—

Source: Pac-12 Conference
Legend: Blue = home team win; Yellow = draw; Red = away team win.
For upcoming matches, an "a" indicates there is an article about the rivalry between the two participants.

=== Positions by round ===
Team ╲ Round	1	2	3	4	5	6	7	8	9	10
Washington	2	2								
Stanford	3	5								
California	6	6								
Oregon State	1	1								
UCLA	5	4								
San Diego State	4	3								

Leader and 2023 NCAA Division I men's soccer tournament

Source: Pac-12.com

== Rankings ==
=== National rankings ===
	Improvement in ranking
	Drop in ranking
RV	Received votes but were not ranked in Top 25
NV	No votes received

		Pre	Wk 1	Wk 2	Wk 3	Wk 4	Wk 5	Wk 6	Wk 7	Wk 8	Wk 9	Wk 10	Wk 11	Wk 12	Wk 13	Wk 14	Wk 15	Final
California	USC	NV	RV	NV	NV	NV	NV	NV	NV	NV	NV	NV	NV	None released				NV
California	TDS	NV	NV	NV	NV	NV	NV	NV	NV	NV	NV	NV	NV	NV	NV	NV	NV	NV
California	CSN	NV	NV	29	RV	NV	NV	NV	NV	NV	NV	NV	NV	NV	None released			NV
Oregon State	USC	RV	NV	RV	NV	NV	NV	RV	NV	RV	NV	NV	NV	None released				4
Oregon State	TDS	NV	NV	NV	NV	NV	NV	NV	NV	NV	NV	NV	NV	NV	15	4	3	4
Oregon State	CSN	NV	NV	NV	NV	RV	NV	RV	RV	NV	NV	NV	NV	NV	None released			4
San Diego State	USC	NV	NV	RV	18	21	17	22	NV	NV	NV	NV	NV	None released				NV
San Diego State	TDS	NV	NV	NV	25	21	14	21	NV	NV	NV	NV	NV	NV	NV	NV	NV	NV
San Diego State	CSN	NV	NV	NV	28	24	21	22	28	RV	NV	NV	NV	NV	None released			NV
Stanford	USC	7	4	1	1	8	6	10	9	17	15	19	22	None released				5
Stanford	TDS	8	2	1	1	6	4	6	7	14	16	21	NV	NV	12	3	5	5
Stanford	CSN	9	5	2	1	6	4	5	8	11	12	13	19	20	None released			7
UCLA	USC	RV	RV	RV	RV	NV	NV	NV	RV	NV	RV	NV	21	None released				21
UCLA	TDS	NV	NV	NV	NV	NV	NV	25	24	NV	NV	NV	21	12	20	20	20	20
UCLA	CSN	27	RV	RV	RV	RV	NV	NV	RV	NV	RV	30	17	17	None released			26
Washington	USC	6	22	25	RV	20	22	RV	RV	NV	NV	NV	NV	None released				NV
Washington	TDS	3	9	4	14	7	11	20	25	NV	NV	NV	NV	NV	NV	NV	NV	NV
Washington	CSN	5	13	11	23	16	24	RV	NV	NV	NV	NV	NV	NV	None released			NV

=== Regional rankings - USC Far West Region ===
	Improvement in ranking
	Drop in ranking
RV	Received votes but were not ranked in Top 10
NV	No votes received

The United Soccer Coaches' Far West region ranks teams across the Pac-12, Big West, and West Coast Conferences.

	Wk 1	Wk 2	Wk 3	Wk 4	Wk 5	Wk 6	Wk 7	Wk 8	Wk 9	Wk 10	Wk 11	Wk 12
California	2	7	4	9								
Oregon State	4	3	7	1								
San Diego State	7	2	2	2								
Stanford	1	1	1	3								
UCLA	3	8	6	7								
Washington	6	4	3	5								

== Awards and honors ==
=== Player of the week honors ===
Following each week's games, Pac-12 conference officials select the player of the week.

Week	Player	School	Pos.	Ref.
Aug. 28	Zach Bohane	Stanford	MF	
Sep. 4	Sam Fowler	Washington	GK	
Sep. 11	Austin Brummett	San Diego State	FW	
Sep. 18	Logan Farrington	Oregon State	FW	
Sep. 25	Richie Aman	Washington	MF	
Oct. 2	Ryan Becher	UCLA	MF	
Oct. 9	Jack Sarkos	UCLA	FW	
Oct. 16	Tristan Viviani	San Diego State	D	
Oct. 23	Shane de Flores	Stanford	MF	
Oct. 30	Zach Bohane	Stanford	MF	
Nov. 6	Jose Contell	UCLA	FW	
Nov. 13	Mark Fisher	Stanford	MF	

=== Postseason honors ===
==== Conference honors ====
2023 Pac-12 Men's Soccer Individual Awards
Award	Recipient(s)
Player of the Year	Logan Farrington – Oregon State
Defensive Player of the Year	Wyatt Meyer – California
Coach of the Year	Leonard Griffin – California
Freshman of the Year	Reid Fisher – San Diego State

2023 Pac-12 Men's Soccer All-Conference Teams
First Team Honorees	Second Team Honorees	Honorable Mention
Javier Armas – Oregon State; Fletcher Bank – Stanford; Zach Bohane – Stanford; Kevin Carmichael – California; Luis Castillo – Oregon State; Evan Davila – California; Logan Farrington – Oregon State; Nate Jones – Washington; Kalani Kossa-Rienzi – Washington; Tucker Lepley – UCLA; Wyatt Meyer – California	Nonso Adimabua – California; Noah Adnan – Stanford; Jose Contell – UCLA; Shane de Flores – Stanford; Logan Erb – San Diego State; Mark Fisher – Stanford; Chris Meyers – Washington; Jack Sarkos – UCLA; Tommy Silva – UCLA; Christian Soto – Washington; Ellis Spikner – Oregon State	Richie Aman – Washington; Khai Brisco – Washington; Arnau Farnos – Oregon State; Reid Fisher – San Diego State; Bryan Iliohan – Washington; Rommee Jaridly – San Diego State; Sean Karani – UCLA; Connor Lambe – California; Andre Ochoa – UCLA; Reid Sproat – San Diego State; Dante Williams – Oregon State

==== National honors ====
USC 1st Team	USC 2nd Team	TDS 1st Team	TDS 2nd Team	CSN 1st Team	CSN 2nd Team

== MLS SuperDraft ==
=== Total picks by school ===
Team	Round 1	Round 2	Round 3	Total
California	1	1	–	2
Oregon State	1	2	–	3
San Diego State	–	–	–	0
Stanford	–	–	3	3
UCLA	1	–	1	2
Washington	2	–	–	2
Total	5	3	4	12

=== List of selections ===
Round	Pick #	MLS team	Player	Position	College
1	3	FC Dallas	(United States) Logan Farrington	FW	Oregon State
1	5	Austin FC	(United States) Nate Jones	DF	Washington
1	10	CF Montreal	(United States) Grayson Doody	DF	UCLA
1	11	Nashville SC	(United States) Wyatt Meyer	DF	California
1	23	Seattle Sounders FC	(United States) Kalani Kossa-Rienzi	DF	Washington
2	44	FC Dallas	(United States) Turner Humphrey	DF	Oregon State
2	48	Atlanta United FC	(Spain) Javier Armas	DF	Oregon State
2	50	Nashville SC	(United States) Kevin Carmichael	DF	California
3	62	LA Galaxy	(United States) Tucker Lepley	MF	UCLA
3	63	Philadelphia Union	(United States) Zachary Bohane	FW	Stanford
3	72	Chicago Fire FC	(United States) Shane de Flores	MF	Stanford
3	85	Toronto FC	(United States) Fletcher Bank	MF	Stanford
