= 2022 Stanford Cardinal men's soccer team =

Men's soccer team

2022 Stanford Cardinal men's soccer
- Conference: Pac-12 Conference

Ranking
- Coaches: No. 5
- TopDrawerSoccer.com: No. 14
- Record: 9–2–4 (3–2–3 Pac-12)
- Head coach: Jeremy Gunn (11th season)
- Assistant coaches: Oige Kennedy (7th season); Ben Moane (4th season)
- Home stadium: Laird Q. Cagan Stadium

2022 Pac-12 Conference men's soccer standings
	Conf.					Overall
Team	W		L		T	W		L		T
No. 11 Washington†	7	–	1	–	2	15	–	2	–	3
No. 7 Stanford+	4	–	2	–	4	12	–	2	–	6
Oregon State+	3	–	1	–	5	7	–	4	–	6
UCLA+	4	–	4	–	1	12	–	7	–	1
San Diego State	1	–	6	–	3	5	–	9	–	4
California	1	–	6	–	3	3	–	8	–	6
† – Conference champion + – At-large invitation to the 2022 NCAA tournament; As of December 13, 2022; Rankings from United Soccer Coaches; Source: Pac-12

The 2022 Stanford Cardinal men's soccer team represented Stanford University during the 2022 NCAA Division I men's soccer season. They were led by eleventh year head coach Jeremy Gunn.

== Previous season ==
The Cardinal had a down year. They finished conference play at 2–4–4, 4th place in the Pac-12 season and 6–6–6 overall. The Cardinal were not invited to play in the postseason tournament.

== Preseason Media polls ==
Predicted finish	Team	Votes (1st place)
T1	Oregon State	21 (2)
T1	Washington	21 (1)
3	UCLA	18 (2)
4	Stanford	14 (1)
5	San Diego State	10
6	California	6

== Offseason ==
=== 2022 recruiting class ===
Name	Nat.	Hometown	Club	TDS rating
Fletcher Bank; MF	USA	Bakersfield, California	Garces Memorial High School/DMS11	2/5 stars
Palmer Bank; DF	USA	Bakersfield, California	Garces Memorial High School/DMS11	2/5 stars
Zachary Bohane; MF	USA	Monte Sereno, California	Los Gatos High School/De Anza Force	3/5 stars
Will Cleary; MF	USA	Windsor, Connecticut	Loomis Chaffee School/TOVO Academy	4/5 stars
Liam Doyle; FW	JPN	Tokyo, Japan	Northwood School/Black Rock FC	3/5 stars
Dyland Hooper; DF	USA	Shawnee, Kansas	Mill Valley High School/Sporting KC Academy	4/5 stars
Takashi Sasaki; DF	USA	Issaquah, Washington	Issaquah High School/Seattle Sounders FC Academy	4/5 stars
Rowan Schnebly; GK	USA	Portland, Oregon	Lincoln High School/Portland Timbers Academy	2/5 stars

=== Departures ===
Name	Number	Pos.	Height	Weight	Year	Hometown	Reason for departure
Andrew Aprahamian	2	DF	5'11"	165	RS-Senior	Malvern, PA	Graduated
Will Richmond	7	MF	5'10"	170	Senior	Piedmont, CA	Graduated, signed with San Jose Earthquakes
Gabe Segal	9	FW	5'10"	160	Junior	Bethesda, MD	Signed with 1. FC Köln II
Ousseni Bouda	11	FW/MF	5'10"	170	Junior	Ouagadougou, Burkina Faso	Drafted in 2022 MLS SuperDraft by San Jose Earthquakes, 8th overall
Ryan Ludwick	12	MF/DF	5'11"	165	Senior	York, PA	Graduated, signed with Tormenta FC 2
Zach Ryan	14	FW	6'1"	175	RS-Senior	Chatham Borough, NJ	Graduated, signed with New York Red Bulls
Kyle Orciuch	31	GK	6'2"	185	RS-Junior	St. John, IN	Graduated

== Roster ==
Source: Note: Flags indicate national team as defined under FIFA eligibility rules; some limited exceptions apply. Players may hold more than one non-FIFA nationality.

No.	Pos.	Nation	Player
2	DF	USA	Noah Adnan
3	DF	USA	Keegan Tingey
4	MF	USA	Conner Maurer
5	DF	USA	Keegan Hughes
6	MF	USA	Mark Fisher
8	MF	USA	Cam Cilley
10	FW	FRA	Carlo Agostinelli
11	FW	ENG	Alfonso Tenconi-Gradillas
12	MF	USA	Zach Bohane
13	MF	USA	Shane de Flores
14	FW	JPN	Liam Doyle
15	MF	USA	Will Cleary
16	MF	USA	Layton Purchase
17	MF	USA	Connor Evans
18	MF	USA	Aiden Weaver

No.	Pos.	Nation	Player
19	FW	USA	Jackson Kiil
20	MF	USA	Will Reilly
21	DF	USA	Ryan Dunn
22	DF	USA	Nico Rei McMillan
23	MF	GHA	Kwabena Kwakwa
24	DF	USA	Nolan Evans
25	DF	USA	Dylan Hooper
27	MF	USA	Fletcher Bank
28	DF	USA	Palmer Bank
29	DF	USA	Takashi Sasaki
30	GK	USA	Eliot Jones
31	GK	USA	Rowan Schnebly
32	GK	USA	Jack Morris
33	GK	USA	Matt Frank

== Schedule ==
Date Time, TV	Rank^{#}	Opponent^{#}	Result	Record	Site (Attendance) City, State
Exhibition
August 17, 2022*; 7:00 pm		Sonoma State	W 3–1	–	Laird Q. Cagan Stadium; Stanford, CA
August 20, 2022*; 7:00 pm		San Francisco	W 2–0	–	Laird Q. Cagan Stadium; Stanford, CA
Regular season
August 25, 2022*; 7:00 pm, Pac-12 Insider		Villanova	W 1–0	1–0–0	Laird Q. Cagan Stadium (545); Stanford, CA
August 28, 2022*; 7:00 pm, Stanford Live Stream		SMU	W 3–1	2–0–0	Laird Q. Cagan Stadium (753); Stanford, CA
September 1, 2022*; 3:00 pm, P12N	No. 3	UC Davis	W 3–0	3–0–0	Laird Q. Cagan Stadium (456); Stanford, CA
September 4, 2022*; 7:00 pm, P12N	No. 3	San Jose State	W 4–0	4–0–0	Laird Q. Cagan Stadium (1,672); Stanford, CA
September 9, 2022*; 5:30 pm, FloFC	No. 2	at Creighton	T 1–1	4–0–1	Morrison Stadium (4,136); Omaha, NE
September 15, 2022; 6:00 pm, P12N	No. 2	No. 25 UCLA	T 0–0	4–0–2 (0–0–1)	Laird Q. Cagan Stadium (1,380); Stanford, CA
September 18, 2022; 2:00 pm, Pac-12 LA	No. 2	San Diego State	T 0–0	4–0–3 (0–0–2)	Laird Q. Cagan Stadium (893); Stanford, CA
September 24, 2022*; 7:00 pm, ESPN+	No. 5	at UC Santa Barbara	W 2–1	5–0–3	Harder Stadium (3,174); Santa Barbara, CA
September 29, 2022; 8:00 pm, P12N	No. 6	California	W 5–1	6–0–3 (1–0–2)	Laird Q. Cagan Stadium (1,900); Stanford, CA
October 6, 2022; 7:30 pm, P12N	No. 5	at No. 1 Washington	L 0–3	6–1–3 (1–1–2)	Husky Soccer Stadium (2,953); Seattle, WA
October 9, 2022; 12:00 pm, P12N	No. 5	at Oregon State	T 2–2	6–1–4 (1–1–3)	Paul Lorenz Field at Patrick Wayne Valley Stadium (887); Corvallis, OR
October 15, 2022*; 1:00 pm	No. 9	at Saint Mary's	W 2–0	7–1–4	Saint Mary's Stadium (556); Moraga, CA
October 20, 2022; 7:00 pm, Aztec Digital Network	No. 5	San Diego State	W 3–2	8–1–4 (2–1–3)	SDSU Sports Deck (382); San Diego, CA
October 23, 2022; 3:00 pm, P12N	No. 5	at UCLA	W 1–0	9–1–4 (3–1–3)	Wallis Annenberg Stadium (1,657); Los Angeles, CA
October 27, 2022; 8:00 pm, P12N	No. 5	Oregon State	L 1–2	9–2–4 (3–2–3)	Laird Q. Cagan Stadium (679); Stanford, CA
October 30, 2022; 4:00 pm, P12N	No. 5	No. 1 Washington	T 3–3	9–2–5 (3–2–4)	Laird Q. Cagan Stadium (2,156); Stanford, CA
November 7, 2022*; 5:30 pm, Pac-12 Insider	No. 6	Pacific	W 7–0	10–2–5	Laird Q. Cagan Stadium (998); Stanford, CA
November 10, 2022; 2:00 pm, Pac-12 BA	No. 5	at California	W 1–0	11–2–5 (4–2–4)	Edwards Stadium (1,290); Berkeley, CA
NCAA Tournament
November 20, 2022*; 5:00 pm, ESPN+	No. 5	Creighton; Second Round	W 6–2	12–2–5	Laird Q. Cagan Stadium (1,229); Stanford, CA
November 27, 2022*; 5:00 pm, ESPN+	No. 5	No. 7 UNC Greensboro; Third Round	T 1–1 (1–3 PKs)	12–2–6	Laird Q. Cagan Stadium (1,393); Stanford, CA
*Non-conference game. ^{#}Rankings from United Soccer Coaches. (#) Tournament seedings in parentheses. All times are in Western.

== Rankings ==
Ranking movements Legend: ██ Increase in ranking ██ Decrease in ranking — = Not ranked т = Tied with team above or below
	Week																	
Poll	Pre	1	2	3	4	5	6	7	8	9	10	11	12	13	14	15	16	Final
United Soccer	—	3	2	2т	5т	6	5	9	5	5	6	5	Not released					7
TopDrawer Soccer	—	—	—	23	20	19	9	9	14	5	5	7	7	4	3	5	6	9
College Soccer News	—	—	6	6	9	7	6	9	7	6	5	11			Not released			
