= 2022 UCLA Bruins men's soccer team =

American college soccer season

2022 UCLA Bruins men's soccer

NCAA Tournament, Third Round
- Conference: Pac-12 Conference
- Record: 12-7-1 (4-4-1 Pac-12)
- Head coach: Ryan Jorden (4th season)
- Assistant coaches: Paul Killian (2nd season); Andres Ochoa (3rd season); Juan Cervantes (3rd season)
- Home stadium: Wallis Annenberg Stadium (Capacity: 3,000)

2022 Pac-12 Conference men's soccer standings
	Conf.					Overall
Team	W		L		T	W		L		T
No. 11 Washington†	7	–	1	–	2	15	–	2	–	3
No. 7 Stanford+	4	–	2	–	4	12	–	2	–	6
Oregon State+	3	–	1	–	5	7	–	4	–	6
UCLA+	4	–	4	–	1	12	–	7	–	1
San Diego State	1	–	6	–	3	5	–	9	–	4
California	1	–	6	–	3	3	–	8	–	6
† – Conference champion + – At-large invitation to the 2022 NCAA tournament; As of December 13, 2022; Rankings from United Soccer Coaches; Source: Pac-12

The 2022 UCLA Bruins men's soccer team represented the University of California, Los Angeles (UCLA) during the 2022 NCAA Division I men's soccer season.

== Current roster ==
As of January 11, 2022

Note: Flags indicate national team as defined under FIFA eligibility rules; some limited exceptions apply. Players may hold more than one non-FIFA nationality.

No.	Pos.	Nation	Player
1	GK	USA	Justin Garces
2	MF	ISR	Yoni Sorokin
4	DF	NOR	Kasper Strom
5	DF	USA	AJ Vasquez
6	MF	USA	Andrew Paoli
7	MF	USA	Jose Sosa
8	MF	USA	Cody Sundquist
9	FW	ESP	Jose Contell
10	MF	USA	Riley Ferch
11	MF	USA	Tucker Lepley

No.	Pos.	Nation	Player
12	FW	USA	Grayson Doody
13	DF	USA	Pablo Greenlee
14	MF	USA	Andrew Valverde
16	FW	USA	Kevin Diaz
17	MF	BRA	Marcony Pimentel
18	GK	USA	Tyler Kirberg
19	MF	USA	Luke Bone
20	DF	USA	Ruben Soria
21	DF	CYP	Constantinos Michaelides
22	GK	CYP	Aristides Costeas
23	FW	USA	Ollie de Visser

== Schedule and results ==
Date Time, TV	Rank^{#}	Opponent^{#}	Result	Record	Site (Attendance) City, State
Exhibition
August 15th 7:30 p.m.		Westmont	W 2-0	--	Wallis Annenberg Stadium (--); Westwood, Los Angeles, California
August 20th 7:30 p.m.		UNLV	T 0-0	--	Wallis Annenberg Stadium (--); Westwood, Los Angeles, California
Regular season
August 25th* 7:00 p.m., P12N		UC Irvine	W 1-0	1-0-0	Wallis Annenberg Stadium (745); Westwood, Los Angeles, California
August 28th* 6:00 p.m., P12N		Virginia Tech	W 1-0	2-0-0	Wallis Annenberg Stadium (515); Westwood, Los Angeles, California
September 2nd* 7:00 p.m., UCLA Live Stream-2		Liberty	W 5-2	3-0-0	Wallis Annenberg Stadium (553); Westwood, Los Angeles, California
September 5th* 7:00 p.m., P12N		Grand Canyon	L 3-2	3-1-0	Wallis Annenberg Stadium (449); Westwood, Los Angeles, California
September 10th* 7:00 p.m.		Portland	L 2-0	3-2-0	Wallis Annenberg Stadium (1,625); Westwood, Los Angeles, California
September 15th 6:00 p.m., P12N		at Stanford	T 0-0	3-2-1 (0-0-1)	Laird Q. Cagan Stadium (1,380); Stanford, California
September 18th 4:00 p.m., P12N		at California	W 2-1	4-2-1 (1-0-1)	Edwards Stadium (487); Berkeley, California
September 24th* 7:00 p.m., UCLA Live Stream-2		Cal State Fullerton	W 1-0	5-2-1 (1-0-1)	Wallis Annenberg Stadium (1,174); Westwood, Los Angeles, California
September 29th 6:00 p.m., P12N		Oregon State	L 1-0	5-3-1 (1-1-1)	Wallis Annenberg Stadium (694); Westwood, Los Angeles, California
October 2nd 4:00 p.m., P12N		Washington	L 1-0	5-4-1 (1-2-1)	Wallis Annenberg Stadium (1,081); Westwood, Los Angeles, California
October 7th 7:00 p.m., P12LA		San Diego State	W 2-0	6-4-1 (2-2-1)	Wallis Annenberg Stadium (978); Westwood, Los Angeles, California
October 14th* 7:00 p.m.		at Loyola Marymount	W 2-0	7-4-1 (2-2-1)	Sullivan Field (1,160); Los Angeles, California
October 20th 7:30 p.m., P12N		California	W 1-0	8-4-1 (3-2-1)	Wallis Annenberg Stadium (1,179); Westwood, Los Angeles, California
October 23rd 3:00 p.m., P12N		Stanford	L 1-0	8-5-1 (3-3-1)	Wallis Annenberg Stadium (1,657); Westwood, Los Angeles, California
October 29th* 1:00 p.m., BTN		at Rutgers	W 1-0	9-5-1 (3-3-1)	Yurcak Field (824); New Brunswick, New Jersey
November 3rd 8:00 p.m., P12N		at Washington	L 3-2	9-6-1 (3-4-1)	Husky Soccer Stadium (1,030); Seattle, Washington
November 6th 2:00 p.m., Pac-12 Insider		at Oregon State	Canceled	9-6-1 (3-4-1)	Patrick Wayne Valley Stadium; Corvallis, Oregon
November 11th 7:00 p.m.		at San Diego State	W 2-1	10-6-1 (4-4-1)	SDSU Sports Deck (608); San Diego, California
NCAA Tournament
November 17th* 5:00 pm, ESPN+		California Baptist; First Round	W 2-1	11-6-1	Wallis Annenberg Stadium (881); Westwood, Los Angeles, California
November 20th* 6:00 pm, ESPN+		at (6) No. 18т Clemson; Second Round	W 2-1	12-6-1	Riggs Field (1,186); Clemson, South Carolina
November 26th* 7:00 pm, ESPN+		at Vermont; Third Round	L 3-0	12-7-1	Virtue Field (2,500); Burlington, Vermont
*Non-conference game. ^{#}Rankings from United Soccer Coaches. (#) Tournament seedings in parentheses. All times are in Pacific.

== 2022 MLS SuperDraft ==
Player	Team	Round	Pick #	Position
Ahmed Longmire	Nashville SC	1	10	DF
Ben Reveno	New England Revolution	2	52	DF

=== Homegrown players ===
Original MLS team	Player	Position	College	Conference	Notes	Ref.
Atlanta United FC	(United States) Justin Garces	GK	UCLA	Pac-12		
