= Pac-12 Conference Men's Soccer Coach of the Year =

The Pac-12 Conference Men's Soccer Coach of the Year is a currently dormant annual award given to the best head coach in the Pac-12 Conference during the NCAA Division I men's soccer season. The award was first presented in 2000, and continued until the conference's collapse after the 2023 season. Pac-12 men's soccer will resume in 2026, with legacy full member Oregon State, plus incoming full members Gonzaga and San Diego State, joined by four new affiliates from the Big West Conference.

Kevin Grimes has won the award five times.

== Key ==
†	Co-Coaches of the Year

== Winners ==
=== Coach of the Year (2000–2023, 2026–present) ===
Season	Coach	School	Reference
2000	Bobby Clark	Stanford	
2001	Bret Simon	Stanford	
2002	Kevin Grimes; Dana Taylor	California; Oregon State	
2003	Tom Fitzgerald	UCLA	
2004	Jorge Salcedo; Dean Wurzberger	UCLA; Washington	
2005	Kevin Grimes (2)	California	
2006	Kevin Grimes (3)	California	
2007	Kevin Grimes (4)	California	
2008	Jorge Salcedo (2)	UCLA	
2009	Bret Simon (2)	Stanford	
2010	Kevin Grimes (5)	California	
2011	Jorge Salcedo (3)	UCLA	
2012	Jorge Salcedo (4)	UCLA	
2013	Jamie Clark	Washington	
2014	Jeremy Gunn	Stanford	
2015	Jeremy Gunn (2)	Stanford	
2016	Jeremy Gunn (3)	Stanford	
2017	Jeremy Gunn (4)	Stanford	
2018	Terry Boss	Oregon State	
2019	Jamie Clark (2)	Washington	
2020	Jamie Clark (3)	Washington	
2021	Terry Boss (2)	Oregon State	
2022	Jamie Clark (4)	Washington	
2023	Leonard Griffin	California	
2026	Jarred Brookins	Oregon State	
