= 2026 Pac-12 Conference men's soccer season =

- League: NCAA Division I
- Sport: Soccer
- Duration: August 20 – December 15, 2026
- Teams: 7

2027 MLS SuperDraft

Regular season
- Season MVP: FW: TBD; MF: TBD; DF: TBD; GK: TBD

Tournament

Men's soccer seasons
- 2023 2027

2026 Pac-12 Conference men's soccer standings
	Conf.					Overall
Team	W		L		T	W		L		T
No. 24т Oregon State †	4	–	1	–	1	9	–	4	–	4
Cal Baptist	3	–	1	–	2	12	–	3	–	2
San Diego State	1	–	0	–	5	3	–	7	–	9
UC Riverside	2	–	2	–	2	5	–	7	–	5
UC San Diego	1	–	1	–	4	7	–	6	–	4
Cal Poly	1	–	3	–	2	6	–	7	–	5
Gonzaga	1	–	5	–	0	5	–	9	–	3
† – Conference champion ‡ – 2026 Pac-12 tournament champion + – At-large invitation to the 2026 NCAA tournament; As of October 31, 2026; Rankings from United Soccer Coaches; Source: Pac-12

The 2026 Pac-12 Conference men's soccer season is the 25th season of men's varsity soccer in the conference, and the first since 2023. Part of the 2026 NCAA Division I men's soccer season, the Pac-12 began play in August 2026 and will conclude in December 2026.

Due to extensive changes in conference membership as part of the larger 2021–2026 NCAA conference realignment, the only remaining teams from the Pac-12's last men's soccer season in 2023 are Oregon State and San Diego State. Oregon State is one of the two current full members that remained in the conference after its 2024 collapse, and the only one that sponsors men's soccer (the other legacy full member, Washington State, does not). San Diego State had been a Pac-12 associate in men's soccer in 2023 and became a full member in July 2026. For the 2026 season, the two programs were joined by new full conference member Gonzaga and four new associates from the Big West Conference — Cal Baptist, Cal Poly, UC Riverside, and UC San Diego. The Big West teams joined Pac-12 men's soccer under the terms of a cooperative agreement with the Pac-12.

The most recent Pac-12 champion, UCLA, has competed in the Big Ten Conference since 2024 and thus will not defend its title.

== Teams ==
=== Stadiums and locations ===
Team	Location	Stadium	Capacity
Cal Baptist	Riverside, California	CBU Soccer Stadium	500
Cal Poly	San Luis Obispo, California	Alex G. Spanos Stadium	11,075
Gonzaga	Spokane, Washington	Gonzaga Soccer Field	1,500
Oregon State	Corvallis, Oregon	Paul Lorenz Field	1,500
San Diego State	San Diego, California	SDSU Sports Deck	3,000
UC Riverside	Riverside, California	UCR Soccer Stadium	1,000
UC San Diego	La Jolla, California	Triton Soccer Stadium	750

=== Personnel ===
Team	Head coach	Captain	Shirt supplier
Cal Baptist	(United States) Coe Michaelson	(Austria) Tizian Marth	(United States) Nike
Cal Poly	(Republic of Ireland) Oige Kennedy	(United States) Parker Owens	(Germany) Adidas
Gonzaga	(Northern Ireland) Chris McGaughey	(Netherlands) Jelle van Deijck	(United States) Nike
Oregon State	(United States) Jarred Brookins	(United States) Wyatt Borso	(United States) Nike
San Diego State	(United States) Ryan Hopkins	(United States) Avery Huggins	(United States) Nike
UC Riverside	(United States) Tim Cupello	(Mexico) Jona Martinez	(United States) Nike
UC San Diego	(United States) Jon Pascale	(United States) Keenai Braun	(United States) Under Armour

== Preseason ==
=== Preseason poll ===
Pac-12 preseason poll
Predicted finish	Team
1	Oregon State
2	Cal Baptist
3	San Diego State
4	Cal Poly
5	Gonzaga
6	UC Riverside
7	UC San Diego

=== Preseason national polls ===
	United; Soccer	CSN	Top Drawer; Soccer
Cal Baptist			
Cal Poly			
Gonzaga			
Oregon State	19		21
San Diego State			
UC Riverside			
UC San Diego			

=== Hermann Trophy ===
The Hermann Trophy preseason watchlist was announced on August 19, 2026.

Player	Class	Position	School
William Lawson	Jr.	DF	Cal Baptist

== Rankings ==
=== National rankings ===
Legend
Increase in ranking
Decrease in ranking
Not ranked previous week

		Pre	Wk 1	Wk 2	Wk 3	Wk 4	Wk 5	Wk 6	Wk 7	Wk 8	Wk 9	Wk 10	Wk 11	Wk 12	Wk 13	Wk 14	Wk 15	Final
Cal Baptist	USC	—	—	—	—	—	—	—	RV	—	—	—	RV	—	Not released			
Cal Baptist	TDS	—	—	—	—	—	—	—	—	—	—	—	—					
Cal Baptist	CSN	—	—	—	—	—	—	—	RV	—	—	—	—		Not released			
Cal Poly	USC	—	—	—	—	—	—	—	—	—	—	—	—	—	Not released			
Cal Poly	TDS	—	—	—	—	—	—	—	—	—	—	—	—					
Cal Poly	CSN	—	—	—	—	—	—	—	—	—	—	—	—		Not released			
Gonzaga	USC	—	—	—	—	—	—	—	—	—	—	—	—	—	Not released			
Gonzaga	TDS	—	—	—	—	—	—	—	—	—	—	—	—					
Gonzaga	CSN	—	—	—	—	—	—	—	—	—	—	—	—		Not released			
Oregon State	USC	19	25	10	23т	—	RV	21	—	22	21т	—	RV	24т	Not released			
Oregon State	TDS	—	—	6	13	—	—	—	—	19	—	—	—	—				
Oregon State	CSN	21	23	13	14	18	24	24	23	18	25	RV	RV		Not released			
San Diego State	USC	—	—	—	—	—	—	—	—	—	—	—	—	—	Not released			
San Diego State	TDS	—	—	—	—	—	—	—	—	—	—	—	—	—				
San Diego State	CSN	—	—	—	—	—	—	—	—	—	—	—	—		Not released			
UC Riverside	USC	—	—	—	—	—	—	—	—	—	—	—	—	—	Not released			
UC Riverside	TDS	—	—	—	—	—	—	—	—	—	—	—	—	—				
UC Riverside	CSN	—	—	—	—	—	—	—	—	—	—	—	—		Not released			
UC San Diego	USC	—	—	—	—	—	—	—	RV	—	—	—	—	—	Not released			
UC San Diego	TDS	—	—	—	—	—	—	—	—	—	—	—	—	—				
UC San Diego	CSN	—	—	—	—	RV	—	—	—	—	—	—	—		Not released			

=== Regional rankings - Far West Region ===
Legend
Increase in ranking
Decrease in ranking
Not ranked previous week

	Wk 1	Wk 2	Wk 3	Wk 4	Wk 5	Wk 6	Wk 7	Wk 8	Wk 9	Wk 10	Wk 11	Wk 12
Cal Baptist	3	5	5	5	4	3	1	3	4	3	3	4
Cal Poly	9	8	8	9	10	6	9	—	7	9	—	—
Gonzaga	—	—	—	10	9	8	—	—	—	—	—	—
Oregon State	1	1	1	8	2	1	2	1	1	2	1	1
San Diego State	—	—	—	—	—	—	—	—	—	—	—	—
UC Riverside	—	10	10	6	—	—	—	—	—	—	—	—
UC San Diego	6	7	4	4	6	—	8	8	10	10	9	9

== Postseason ==
=== Pac-12 Tournament ===
Semifinals; November 7
2
3
1
4

Championship; November 13 or 14

==== All-Tournament team ====
Player	Team

=== NCAA Tournament ===
Seed	Region	School	1st round	2nd round	3rd round	Quarterfinals	Semifinals	Championship
		TBD						
W–L–D (%):			0–0–0 (–)	0–0–0 (–)	0–0–0 (–)	0–0–0 (–)	0–0–0 (–)	0–0–0 (–) Total: 0–0–0 (–)

== Player statistics ==
As of August 7, 2026

=== Goals ===
Rank	Player	College	Goals

=== Assists ===
Rank	Player	College	Assists

=== Points ===
Two points for a goal, one point for an assist.

Rank	Player	College	Points

== Awards and honors ==
=== Player of the week honors ===
Following each week's games, Pac-12 conference officials select the players of the week.

Week	Offensive		Defensive		Newcomer	
Week	Player	Team	Player	Team	Player	Team
Week 1 (Aug. 25)	Oren Stuppel	UC San Diego	Gavin Carlson	UC San Diego	Wyatt Borso	Oregon State
Week 2 (Sep. 1)	Max Eisenberg	Oregon State	Nic Thiele	UC San Diego	Carson Hammond	Gonzaga
Week 3 (Sep. 9)	Nik Orth	San Diego State	Gavin Carlson (2)	UC San Diego	Gavin Carlson	UC San Diego
Week 4 (Sep. 15)	Drew Pedersen	Gonzaga	Keenai Braun	UC San Diego	Keenai Braun	UC San Diego
Week 5 (Sep. 22)	Tim Hoffman	Oregon State	John Nicolson	Oregon State	Ulrik Stroem	Cal Baptist
Week 6 (Sep. 29)	Charlie Hogan	Cal Poly	Mathew Guerra	Cal Poly	Devin Bening	Cal Poly
Week 7 (Oct. 6)	Justin Ojo	Cal Baptist	Stavros Charalampous	Cal Baptist	John Koutelieris	Oregon State
Week 8 (Oct. 13)	Jaxson Hutcheon	San Diego State	John Nicolson (2)	Oregon State	Wyatt Borso (2)	Oregon State
Week 9 (Oct. 20)						
Week 10 (Oct. 27)						
Week 11 (Nov. 3)						
Week 12 (Nov. 10)						

=== Postseason honors ===
Unanimous selections in bold.

**2026 Pac-12 Men's Soccer Individual Awards**
Award	Recipient(s)
Offensive Player of the Year	
Midfielder of the Year	
Defensive Player of the Year	
Goalkeeper of the Year	
Coach of the Year	
Freshman of the Year	

**2026 Pac-12 Men's Soccer All-Conference Teams**
First Team Honorees	Second Team Honorees	All-Freshman Team Honorees
