= All-Pac-12 =

All-Pac-12 may refer to:

- List of All-Pac-12 Conference football teams
- List of All-Pac-12 Conference men's basketball teams
- List of All-Pac-12 Conference women's basketball teams
- List of All-Pac-12 Conference men's soccer teams

== See also ==
- Pac-12 Conference
