= List of All-Pac-12 Conference men's soccer teams =

The All-Pac-12 men's soccer team is an annual Pac-12 Conference (Pac-12) honor bestowed on the best players in the conference following every college soccer season. Pac-12 coaches select an 11-player first team and a 12-player second team.

== Selections ==
=== 2010–present ===
2013

The 2013 teams.

First team

Note: Flags indicate national team as defined under FIFA eligibility rules; some limited exceptions apply. Players may hold more than one non-FIFA nationality.

No.	Pos.	Nation	Player
1	GK	(United States) USA	Earl Edwards (UCLA)
2	DF	(United States) USA	Steve Birnbaum (California)
3	DF	(United States) USA	Christian Dean (California)
4	DF	(United States) USA	Taylor Peay (Washington)
5	MF	(United States) USA	J. J. Koval (Stanford)
6	MF	(United States) USA	Cristian Roldan (Washington)
7	MF	(Germany) GER	Leo Stolz (UCLA)
8	FW	(United States) USA	Zach Batteer (Stanford)
9	FW	(United States) USA	Darwin Jones (Washington)
10	FW	(Canada) CAN	Jordan Ongaro (San Diego State)
11	FW	(United States) USA	Jordan Morris (Stanford)

Second team

Note: Flags indicate national team as defined under FIFA eligibility rules; some limited exceptions apply. Players may hold more than one non-FIFA nationality.

No.	Pos.	Nation	Player
0	GK	(United States) USA	Justin Taillole (California)
1	GK	(United States) USA	Matt Bersano (Oregon State)
2	DF	(United States) USA	Matt Harris (Washington)
3	DF	(United States) USA	Aaron Simmons (UCLA)
4	DF	(United States) USA	Brandon Vincent (Stanford)
6	MF	(United States) USA	Seth Casiple (California)
7	MF	(Spain) ESP	Victor Muñoz (UCLA)
8	MF	(United States) USA	James Moberg (Washington)
9	FW	(United States) USA	Alec Sundly (California)
10	FW	(United States) USA	Abraham Villon (San Diego State)
11	FW	(Italy) ITA	Stefano Bonomo (California)
12	FW	(United States) USA	Victor Chavez (UCLA)
