= Priddle =

Priddle is a surname. Notable people with this surname include:

- Bill Priddle (born 1963), Canadian rock musician
- Elizabeth Priddle (born 1993), Scottish cricketer
- Fred Priddle (1908–1990), American soccer coach
- Sean Priddle (born 1965), English footballer
- Tony Priddle (born 1970), Australian rugby league footballer

== Other uses ==
- The Priddle Concern, a Canadian rock band formed by Bill Priddle
