= California Intercollegiate Soccer Conference =

Former collegiate soccer league

- Founded: 1926
- Abolished: 1955; 70 years ago
- Region: California
- Last champion: San Francisco (1954)
- Most championships: San Francisco (11 titles)

The California Intercollegiate Soccer Conference was a pre-NCAA College soccer conference for colleges and universities across the California.

The league began play in 1926 and disbanded in 1955 when it was split into two separate leagues: the Northern California Soccer Conference and the Southern California Soccer Association.

San Francisco is the most winning team of the competition with 11 titles.

== Champions ==
Ed.	Season	Champion	Ref.
1	1926	San Mateo (1)	
2	1927	San Mateo (2)	
3	1928	San Mateo (3)	
4	1929	San Mateo (4)	
5	1930	San Mateo (5)	
6	1931	Stanford (1)	
7	1932	San Francisco (1)	
8	1933	San Francisco (2)	
9	1934	San Francisco (3)	
10	1935	San Francisco (4)	
11	1936	California (1)	
12	1937	California (2)	
13	1938	California (3)	
14	1939	San Jose State (1)	
15	1940	San Jose State (2)	
16	1941	San Jose State (3)	
17	1942	San Jose State (4)	
–	1943–1945	(None awarded due to World War II)	
18	1946	California (4)	
19	1947	California (5)	
20	1948	San Francisco (5)	
21	1949	San Francisco (6)	
22	1950	San Francisco (7)	
23	1951	San Francisco (8)	
24	1952	San Francisco (9)	
25	1953	San Francisco (10)	
26	1954	San Francisco (11)	

== Titles by team ==
Team	Titles	Winning years
San Francisco	11	1932, 1933, 1934, 1935, 1948, 1949, 1950, 1951, 1952, 1953, 1954
San Mateo	5	1926, 1927, 1928, 1929, 1930
California	5	1936, 1937, 1938, 1946, 1947
San Jose State	4	1939, 1940, 1941, 1942
Stanford	1	1931
