= Vidal Fernandez =

Mexican-American soccer player and coach (born 1958)

Personal information
- Date of birth: March 25, 1958 (age 68)
- Place of birth: Mexico City, Mexico
- Positions: Midfielder; forward

College career
Years	Team	Apps	(Gls)
1977–1979	San Diego State Aztecs		

Senior career*
Years	Team	Apps	(Gls)
1980	New York Cosmos	0	(0)
1981	California Surf	17	(1)
1981–1982	San Diego Sockers (NASL indoor)	18	(11)
1982–1984	San Diego Sockers	51	(12)
1982–1983	San Diego Sockers (MISL)	47	(34)
1983–1984	San Diego Sockers (NASL indoor)	5	(1)
1986	San Diego Nomads		
1987	San Diego Sockers (MISL)	1	(0)
- * Club domestic league appearances and goals

Vidal Fernandez is a Mexican-American former soccer player who played professionally in the North American Soccer League, Major Indoor Soccer League and Western Soccer Alliance.

== Youth ==
Fernandez was born in Mexico, but moved to Otay Mesa, San Diego, California where he entered Chula Vista High School. He was the 1977 California Interscholastic Federation Soccer Player of the Year as Chula Vista won back to back CIF championships. He is a member of the Sweetwater Union High School District Alumni Hall of Fame. He attended San Diego State University, playing on the men's soccer team from 1977 to 1979. He is a member of the SDSU Aztecs Hall of Fame. He became a U.S. citizen in 1979.

== Professional ==
In December 1979, the New York Cosmos selected Fernandez in the first round of the North American Soccer League draft. He injured his right knee during the 1980 pre-season and had surgery to remove his meniscus. He remained out for the entire 1980 season and was released in August 1980. He then signed as a free agent with the California Surf in 1981. The Surf folded at the end of the season and in the fall of 1981, Fernandez signed with the San Diego Sockers in time to play the NASL indoor season. He went on to play the 1982 NASL outdoor and the 1982-1983 Major Indoor Soccer League seasons with the Sockers. In February 1983, Alkis Panagoulias selected Fernandez for Team America, an attempt to place the United States men's national soccer team into a competitive league. He turned down Team America to remain with the Sockers only to injure his right knee in May 1983. He continued to play, including five games during the 1983-1984 NASL indoor season before retiring in November 1984. In 1986, he attempted to return to soccer when he played as a defender with the San Diego Nomads of the Western Soccer Alliance. In April 1987, Fernandez played one game while on a ten-day contract with the Sockers.

== Coach ==
Fernandez is the head coach of the Chula Vista High School soccer teams, a position he has held since the mid-1980s.
