= Leonid Krupnik =

Leo Krupnik
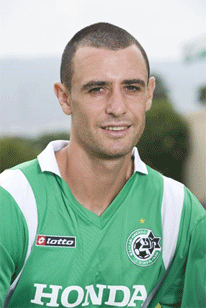

Personal information
- Date of birth: July 15, 1979 (age 47)
- Place of birth: Khmelnytskyi, Ukrainian SSR, Soviet Union (now Ukraine)
- Height: 1.91 m (6 ft 3 in)
- Position: Defender

Youth career
- 1995–1997: San Francisco Vikings
- 1997–2001: California Golden Bears

Senior career*
Years	Team	Apps	(Gls)
2002	Des Moines Menace	11	(0)
2002	MetroStars	0	(0)
2002–2003	Wilmington Hammerheads	27	(1)
2003–2005	Charleston Battery	27	(0)
2005–2006	Maccabi Netanya	24	(1)
2006	Maccabi Herzliya	7	(1)
2007–2008	Bnei Sakhnin	41	(0)
2008–2009	Maccabi Haifa	30	(0)
2009	New York Red Bulls	3	(0)
2010–2013	Maccabi Netanya	84	(0)
2013	→ Hapoel Petah Tikva (loan)	8	(0)
2013–2014	Maccabi Umm al-Fahm	30	(0)
2014–2015	Maccabi Kabilio Jaffa	13	(0)
2015	Sektzia Nes Tziona	15	(0)
- * Club domestic league appearances and goals as of December 31, 2012

Leonid Krupnik
Medal record

Representing United States

Football

Maccabiah Games
Silver medal – second place	2005 Maccabiah	Football

Leonid Krupnik (Note: Ukrainian: Леонід Крупнік, romanized: Leonid Krupnik; Hebrew: ליאוניד קרופניק) (born July 15, 1979) is a former footballer and current coach. He played college soccer at the University of California, Berkeley. He played soccer professionally for the Des Moines Menace, MetroStars, Wilmington Hammerheads, Charleston Battery, Maccabi Netanya, Maccabi Herzliya, Bnei Sakhnin, Maccabi Haifa, New York Red Bulls, Maccabi Netanya, Hapoel Petah Tikva, Maccabi Umm al-Fahm, Maccabi Kabilio Jaffa, and Sektzia Nes Tziona. He won a silver medal at the 2005 Maccabiah Games in Israel with Team USA.

== Career ==
=== Youth and college ===
Krupnik was born in Ukraine and is Jewish. He moved with his parents, Mark and Rita, and brother Vladimir, from his native Khmelnytskyi, Ukraine, to the United States in the 1990s, settling in San Francisco, California. Initially a promising gymnast, Krupnik was spotted playing football with some friends by the manager of the San Francisco Vikings youth team, and the youngster quickly changed sports. Krupnik attended and was the team soccer captain of George Washington High School, graduating in 1997.

He played four years of college soccer at the University of California, Berkeley ('01), majoring in social welfare. Krupnik was All-Pac-10 honorable mention in 2000 and 2001, Pac-10 All-Academic honorable mention in 2000 and first team in 2001. Krupnik was also strong academically, and was on the Dean's Honor List in Fall of 2000.

=== Professional ===
Krupnik was drafted with the 69th pick of the 2002 MLS SuperDraft by the MetroStars, but did not make the squad, and instead spent the 2002 season with the Des Moines Menace of the Premier Development League. He was signed by the MetroStars late in the season, again without seeing any first-team action, and was then released on free transfer to the Wilmington Hammerheads. After winning the 2003 championship with Wilmington, Krupnik was signed by Charleston Battery.

During his time in Israel in 2005 with the US Maccabiah Games team, Krupnik caught the eye of a scout from Maccabi Netanya. Manager Reuven Atar asked Krupnik if he could join the team for training but Krupnik had a contract in the US. It was his sister, Svetlana, who kept in touch with Reuven Atar and immediately after finishing his contract, Krupnik immigrated to Israel. Krupnik was attractive to Israeli club teams because he was eligible to receive Israeli citizenship and not count as a foreigner.

During the 2005–06 season he got into a contract dispute with the management. After the conclusion of the season, ownership of the club changed hands, and the Israeli manager, Reuven Atar, who brought Krupnik to the club, was fired. Krupnik was expected to return to the United States. Talks ensued between him and Major League Soccer but nothing became final.

On July 20, 2006, Reuven Atar was appointed as manager of newly promoted Israeli Premier League club, Maccabi Herzliya. His first action was to sign Krupnik to a contract with the club. Krupnik stayed with the club until the winter recess when he decided not to continue after Maccabi Herzliya would not agree to a new contract.

After leaving Maccabi Herzliya, Krupnik joined Bnei Sakhnin for the second half of the 2006–07 season and helped the club gain promotion to the Israeli Premier League. The following season Krupnik helped the newly promoted side to a fourth-place finish and qualification to the Intertoto Cup.

On June 17, 2008, Krupnik signed a contract with Maccabi Haifa for 3 years worth $360,000. During his first season with the club Krupnik was a fixture in central defense appearing in 30 league matches, and helped Maccabi Haifa clinch their 11th Israeli Premier League title.

Krupnik returned the New York Red Bulls, known as the MetroStars during his first stint with the club, in July 2009. Krupnik made his MLS debut in a 4–0 loss to Colorado Rapids on July 25, 2009, and played in three games for the team before returning to Israel in November, when he was signed for a second stint with Maccabi Netanya.

Since 2015 Krupnik has been the soccer coach at Menlo-Atherton High School in California.

=== International ===
In 2005, coach Lev Kirshner picked Krupnik for the United States squad for the 2005 Maccabiah Games, an international Jewish athletic event similar to the Olympics held in Israel every four years. Kirshner brought a talented squad with the most professional experience ever. The American team, which also had Jonathan Bornstein and Benny Feilhaber playing for it, reached the final but lost to the host Israeli team, which was composed of Israel's Under-21 national team players.

== Statistics ==
Club performance			League		Cup		League Cup		Continental		Total	
Season	Club	League	Apps	Goals	Apps	Goals	Apps	Goals	Apps	Goals	Apps	Goals
USA			League		Open Cup		League Cup		North America		Total	
2002	Des Moines Menace	USL PDL	11	0	1	0	–		0	0	12	0
2002	Wilmington Hammerheads	USL D3 Pro League	27	1	0	0	–		0	0	30	1
2003	Wilmington Hammerheads	USL Pro Select League	27	1	3	0	–		0	0	30	1
2003	Charleston Battery	A-League	27	0	0	0	–		0	0	27	0
2004	Charleston Battery	A-League	27	0	0	0	–		0	0	27	0
2005	Charleston Battery	USL First Division	27	0	0	0	–		0	0	27	0
Israel			League		Israel State Cup		Toto Cup		Europe		Total	
2005–06	Maccabi Netanya	Israeli Premier League	24	1	1	0	4	0	0	0	29	1
2006–07	Maccabi Herzliya	Israeli Premier League	7	1	0	0	2	0	0	0	9	1
2006–07	Bnei Sakhnin	Liga Leumit	10	0	0	0	2	0	0	0	12	0
2007–08	Bnei Sakhnin	Israeli Premier League	31	0	1	0	6	0	0	0	38	0
2008–09	Maccabi Haifa	Israeli Premier League	30	0	4	0	5	0	0	0	39	0
USA			League		Open Cup		League Cup		North America		Total	
2009	New York Red Bulls	Major League Soccer	3	0	0	0	–		0	0	3	0
Israel			League		Israel State Cup		Toto Cup		Europe		Total	
2009–10	Maccabi Netanya	Israeli Premier League	12	0	0	0	0	0	0	0	12	0
2010–11	Maccabi Netanya	Israeli Premier League	31	0	4	0	7	0	0	0	42	0
2011–12	Maccabi Netanya	Israeli Premier League	33	0	3	0	3	0	0	0	38	0
2012–13	Maccabi Netanya	Israeli Premier League	8	0	0	0	4	0	1	0	13	0
Total	USA		65	1	4	0	–		0	0	69	1
Total	Israel		190	2	12	0	29	0	0		221	2
Career total			243	3	10	0	29	0	0	0	288	3

== Honours ==
- Israeli Premier League (1):
  - 2008–09
