= Fred Priddle =

American soccer coach 1908–1990

Personal information
- Full name: Frederick John Priddle
- Date of birth: October 9, 1908
- Place of birth: Albany, New York
- Date of death: July 29, 1990 (aged 81)
- Place of death: Santa Cruz, California

Managerial career
- Years: Team
- 1954–1975: Stanford

Frederick John Priddle (October 9, 1908 – July 29, 1990) is a former collegiate men's head soccer coach. He is best known as the head men's soccer coach at Stanford University from 1954 to 1975. He posted a 133-119-2(.525) in 21 seasons at the helm. He remains the winningest coach in school history with 133 wins. He retired in 1976 after forty years of working for Stanford.

Priddle was born in Albany, New York on October 9, 1908. He married Irene Ruth Hauck in 1936. He died in Santa Cruz, California on July 29, 1990.
