= Kevin Grimes (soccer) =

American soccer player and coach

Personal information
- Full name: Kevin Grimes
- Date of birth: October 9, 1967 (age 59)
- Place of birth: St. Louis, Missouri, U. S.
- Height: 5 ft 11 in (1.80 m)
- Position: Defender

Youth career
- 1983–1990: Scott Gallagher
- 1986–1989: SMU Mustangs

Senior career*
Years	Team	Apps	(Gls)
1990	Colorado Foxes	19	(3)
1991	Tindastóll	12	(2)
1992	Miami Freedom	14	(1)
1993–1994	Los Angeles Salsa	0	(0)
1995	Raleigh Flyers	13	(2)
1996	San Jose Clash	11(E)	(0)
1997	Orange County Zodiac	16	(1)

International career
1983	U.S. U-16	6	(0)
1985	U.S. U-18		
1986	U.S. U-20	3	
1989	U.S. U-23	19	(0)
1988-90	U.S. MNT	5	(0)

Managerial career
- 1995–1997: Irvine Vaqueros
- 1997–1999: SMU Mustangs (assistant)
- 2000–2022: California Golden Bears
- * Club domestic league appearances and goals

Kevin Grimes (born October 9, 1967) is a former U.S. National Team player who played five seasons in the American Professional Soccer League, one in the USISL and one each in Iceland and Major League Soccer. He also earned five caps with the U.S. National Team in 1988. Grimes made over 20 appearances for the U.S. National Team from 1988 to 1990 that were not official international caps, but rather international matches versus other professional clubs from Central and South America.

== Player ==
=== Youth ===
Grimes grew up in St. Louis, where he played youth soccer with the Scott Gallagher Soccer Club. In 1984, he won the McGuire Cup National Championship with Scott Gallagher. He also attended Rosary High School where he was both a 1986 Parade Magazine All-American and National Defender of the Year his senior year. After high school, Grimes attended Southern Methodist University from 1986 to 1989. He was a 1988 and 1989 NSCAA First Team All-American. He was also a Herman Award (National Player of the Year) finalist in both his junior and senior year at SMU. His senior year, he was third in the voting. He graduated in 1990 with a bachelor's degree in Economics.

=== Professional ===
Grimes signed with the Colorado Foxes of the American Professional Soccer League (APSL) in 1990. The St. Louis Storm of the MSL drafted Grimes in 1991 but he left for Iceland where he spent the 1991 season with Tindastoll FC. He returned to the U.S. in 1992 to sign with the Miami Freedom of APSL. On January 20, 1993, he signed with the Los Angeles Salsa. He appeared in several exhibition games for the Salsa but never played a regular season game. In 1995, Grimes then moved to the USISL Raleigh Flyers where he played with former MLS coach, Jason Kreis. In January 1996, the San Jose Clash of Major League Soccer (MLS) selected Grimes in the sixteenth round (158 overall) in the Inaugural Player Draft. After starting 11 of 12 pre-season matches, Grimes injured his shin and the Clash released him on April 20, 1996. Once Grimes recovered from his injury, he signed with the Orange County Zodiac of the A-League He was named an A-League All Star in 1997 and started for the Western Conference in the A-League All-Star game in Rochester, New York. Despite this success, he decided to retire from playing professionally and enter coaching full-time.

=== U.S. National Team ===
Grimes first played for the U.S. as the captain of the U-16 U.S. National Team in 1983. The U.S. qualified for the first ever FIFA U-17 World Cup. The tournament was originally scheduled for 1984 but was delayed a year. With the delay, Grimes and several of his teammates were now too old to participate in the first ever FIFA U-17 World Cup. Grimes also was a member of the U-18, U-20 and U-23 U.S. National Teams.

While at SMU, Lothar Osiander called Grimes into the senior national team camp. Grimes earned his first caps with the U.S. national team in a 1–0 win over Guatemala on January 10, 1988. He went on to play five games with the national team, the last coming in a 1–0 victory over Costa Rica on June 14, 1988.

== Coaching ==
In 1993, Grimes began coaching youth soccer with the San Juan Soccer Club while a member of the Los Angeles Salsa. In 1995, he began coaching the Irvine High School girls soccer team as well as the Mission Viejo Pateadores Soccer Club during his offseason. In his two seasons with Irvine High School, he compiled a 23-13-13 record. In 1997, he decided to retire from playing professionally and commit to a coaching career when he was offered a position as an assistant coach at his alma mater, Southern Methodist University. He remained at SMU through the 1999 season, with his mentor Schellas Hyndman. On April 28, 2000, University of California hired Grimes as its head coach. In the years since then, he was named the Pac-12 Coach of the Year in 2002, 2005, 2006, 2007 and 2010. Cal has won the Pac-12 Championship in 2006, 2007 and 2010. They have also advanced to the NCAA Elite 8 in 2005, 2010, and 2013. In 2010, they lost in PK's at Akron, who ended up winning the NCAA College Cup. Cal has also advanced to the NCAA Sweet 16 four times (2002, 2006, 2008 & 2014). They were selected to the NCAA Tournament 13 times his 22 seasons. In 2017, Grimes had 18 of his former Cal players actively playing professional soccer in the United States and Europe. This is amongst the highest of any college team in the nation. In 2019, Grimes won his 200th collegiate game, all at Cal. In addition, he won his 203rd game the same season and is now the all-time winningest coach in Cal soccer history. On February 1, 2022, Grimes retired from Cal and collegiate coaching. At the time of his retirement, 17 of his former Cal players were playing professionally (8 in MLS, 6 in USL & 3 in NISA). Currently, Grimes is a scout for the United States National Youth Team in Barcelona and an assistant coach for the US U-16 MYNT and the US U-19 MYNT.
