= Ryan Hopkins (soccer) =

American soccer coach (born 1982)

Current position
- Title: Head coach
- Team: San Diego State
- Conference: Pac-12

Biographical details
- Born: April 27, 1982 (age 44); Los Angeles, California, U.S.
- Education: Concordia University Irvine

Playing career
- 2000–2003: Concordia Golden Eagles

Coaching career (HC unless noted)
- 2004–2008: Concordia Golden Eagles (assistant)
- 2009–2011: Cal Poly Mustangs (assistant)
- 2012: Wisconsin Badgers (assistant)
- 2013–2017: Denver Pioneers (assistant)
- 2018–2019: Virginia Cavaliers (assistant)
- 2020–: San Diego State Aztecs

Head coaching record
- Overall: 37–44–16 (.464)

Accomplishments and honors

Championships
- WAC regular season (2024)

Ryan Mitchell Hopkins (born April 27, 1982) is an American former soccer player and coach who has been the head coach of the San Diego State Aztecs men's soccer team since 2020.

Prior to coaching at San Diego State, Hopkins served as an assistant in various capacities at Concordia, Cal Poly, Wisconsin, Denver, and Virginia.

== Career ==
Hopkins was born in Los Angeles County, California in 1982 and was raised in Greater Los Angeles. He played college soccer for Concordia University Irvine where he played for four seasons on their varsity soccer team. Upon graduating in 2004, Hopkins joined the Concordia coaching staff as an assistant coach. He was part of the coaching staff for the 2007 team that reached the 2007 NAIA national final. After five seasons with Concordia, Hopkins took several assistant coach roles for NCAA Division I men's soccer programs including, Cal Poly, Wisconsin, Denver, and Virginia.

Ahead of the 2020 NCAA Division I men's soccer season, Hopkins was hired by San Diego State University to be the head coach of the men's soccer program. In Hopkins' first season, the Aztecs season was delayed to February 2021 due to the COVID-19 pandemic, where they played a Pac-12 slate only. The program finished 1–7–2 in his first season. Since taking over, the program won the Western Athletic Conference regular season title in 2024.

== Head coaching record ==
Record table
| Season | Team | Overall | Conference | Standing | Postseason |
|---|---|---|---|---|---|
San Diego State (Pac-12) (2020–2023)
| 2020 | San Diego State | 1–7–2 | 1–7–2 | 6th | |
| 2021 | San Diego State | 8–7–2 | 2–7–0 | 5th | |
| 2022 | San Diego State | 5–9–4 | 1–6–3 | 5th | |
| 2023 | San Diego State | 6–7–5 | 0–7–3 | 6th | |
San Diego State (WAC) (2024–2025)
| 2024 | San Diego State | 10–5–3 | 7–0–1 | 1st | WAC semifinals |
| 2025 | San Diego State | 7–9–2 | 3–2–2 | 4th | WAC semifinals |
San Diego State (Pac-12) (2026–present)
| 2026 | San Diego State | 0–0–0 | 0–0–0 | — | — |
| San Diego State: | | 37–44–16 (.464) | 14–29–11 (.361) | | |
| Total: | | 37–44–16 (.464) | | | |
National champion Postseason invitational champion Conference regular season champion Conference regular season and conference tournament champion Division regular season champion Division regular season and conference tournament champion Conference tournament champion
