= Jamie Clark (footballer) =

Scottish football player and coach (born 1976)

Personal information
- Date of birth: 13 December 1976 (age 49)
- Place of birth: Aberdeen, Scotland
- Position: Defender

Team information
- Current team: University of Washington (head coach)

College career
Years	Team	Apps	(Gls)
1996	North Carolina Tar Heels		
1997–1998	Stanford Cardinal		

Senior career*
Years	Team	Apps	(Gls)
1999–2001	San Jose Clash	34	(2)
1999	→ Aberdeen (loan)	0	(0)
2000	→ MLS Pro 40 (loan)	1	(0)
2001	Falkirk	0	(0)
2001–2002	Raith Rovers	3	(0)
2002	Minnesota Thunder	3	(0)
Total		41	(2)

Managerial career
- 2002–2005: New Mexico Lobos (assistant)
- 2006–2007: Notre Dame Fighting Irish (assistant)
- 2008–2009: Harvard Crimson
- 2010: Creighton Bluejays
- 2011–: Washington Huskies
- * Club domestic league appearances and goals

James Clark (born 13 December 1976) is a Scottish football coach and former professional player who is the head coach of the University of Washington.

== Early life ==
Clark was born on 13 December 1976 in Aberdeen. His father is former player Bobby Clark.

== College career ==
Clark, a defender, played his freshman season of college soccer at the University of North Carolina, before transferring to Stanford University, where he graduated in 1999.

== Professional career ==
Clark was selected in the 1999 MLS College Draft by the San Jose Clash. Clark made his debut for San Jose before he had graduated from college, and played in twenty consecutive games for the club during his first season. Clark made 34 league appearances in total for San Jose. While at San Jose, Clark spent a brief loan spell at Scottish side Aberdeen, although he never made a league appearance at the club. He also played one game on loan to MLS Pro 40 during the 2000 USL A-League season. Clark spent a total of two and a half seasons playing in Major League Soccer, before returning to Scotland to play with Falkirk and Raith Rovers, before being forced to retire from playing due to a groin injury.

== Coaching career ==
Clark was an assistant coach at the University of New Mexico from 2002 to 2005, and an assistant coach at the University of Notre Dame from 2006 to 2007. Clark was named as head coach of Harvard University in February 2008. He led the Crimson to a 26–10–1 record in his two years there, earning bids to the NCAA tournament both seasons. In June 2010, he was named head coach at Creighton University. He coached the Bluejays for one season, leading them to a 13–5–2 record and an at-large berth in the NCAA tournament, where Creighton reached the second round before losing to SMU in a shootout. On 26 January 2011, he resigned at Creighton to become head coach of the Washington Huskies.

== Honours ==
New Mexico Lobos

- NCAA Tournament Championship: Runners-up 2005 (as assistant)

Harvard Crimson

- Ivy League Championship: 2009

Creighton Blue Jays

- MVC Regular Season Championship: 2010

Washington Huskies

- Pac-12 Conference Championship: 2013, 2019, 2020

Individual

- NSCAA Northeast Region Coach of Year: 2009
- Pac-12 Coach of the Year: 2013, 2019, 2020, 2022
