= California Golden Bears men's soccer =

American college soccer team

- 2024 California Golden Bears men's soccer team
- Founded: 1906; 120 years ago
- University: University of California, Berkeley
- Head coach: Leonard Griffin (3rd season)
- Conference: ACC
- Location: Berkeley, California, US
- Stadium: Edwards Stadium (capacity: 22,000)
- Nickname: Bears, Cal, UC Berkeley
- Colors: Blue and gold
Home	Away

NCAA tournament Quarterfinals
- 1960, 2005, 2013

NCAA tournament Round of 16
- 1960, 1977, 2002, 2005, 2006, 2008, 2013, 2014

NCAA tournament appearances
- 1960, 1977, 1981, 1983, 1985, 1986, 1996, 2001, 2002, 2003, 2004, 2005, 2006, 2007, 2008, 2010, 2013, 2014, 2017, 2019

Conference tournament championships
- 1936, 1937, 1938, 1946, 1947, 1983, 1996, 2006, 2007, 2010

For information on all University of California, Berkeley sports, see California Golden Bears

The California Golden Bears men's soccer team is a varsity intercollegiate athletic team of University of California, Berkeley in Berkeley, California, United States. The team is a member of the ACC, which is part of the National Collegiate Athletic Association's Division I. California's first men's soccer team was fielded in 1906. The team plays its home games at Edwards Stadium. The Golden Bears are coached by Kevin Grimes.

== History ==
The university fielded its first soccer team in 1906. The Bears won their first conference in 1936, the California Intercollegiate. Until the league was disbanded in 1954, the team had won 5 conference titles. The Bears have been in several NCAA conferences over their history.

In 1983, the Bears won the Pacific Soccer Conference. The Bears won the Mountain Pacific tournament in 1996. In 2000, the Bears joined the Pac-12 Conference, when men's soccer was enlisted as a varsity sport in the conference. Since then, the Bears have won three Pac-12 titles: 2006, 2007 and 2010.

The Bears have appeared in the NCAA Division I men's soccer tournament 18 times. Their best performances came in 1960, 2005 and 2013, where the Bears reached the quarter-finals of the competition.

== Players ==
=== Current roster ===
As of 27 Feb 2025

Note: Flags indicate national team as defined under FIFA eligibility rules; some limited exceptions apply. Players may hold more than one non-FIFA nationality.

No.	Pos.	Nation	Player
00	GK	USA	Ryan Savoie
0	GK	USA	Aidan Ahmad
0	GK	USA	Alex Robb
1	GK	USA	Marco Brougher
2	DF	USA	Kevin Carmichael
3	MF	USA	Giancarlo Mota
4	MF	USA	Kai Djerbaka
5	MF	JPN	Gaku Nishimura
6	MF	USA	Jack Bowers
7	MF	USA	Justin Knighton
8	MF	USA	Allan Juarez
9	FW	USA	Rohan McEligot
10	FW	NGR	Nonso Adimabua
11	MF	USA	Kieran Bracken Serra
12	FW	USA	Arik Duncan
13	DF	NGR	Wisdom Onuoma
14	DF	USA	Griffin Gustafson
15	MF	USA	Adrian Guzman
16	MF	USA	Eli Wachs
17	MF	USA	Kevin Rodriguez

No.	Pos.	Nation	Player
18	FW	USA	Brendan Bell
19	DF	USA	Alfredo Ortiz
21	MF	USA	Nik Laredo
22	DF	USA	Owen Bizzaro
23	DF	USA	Cameron Robie
24	GK	USA	Connor Lambe
25	FW	GER	Isaiah Thomas
27	DF	USA	Malcolm Zalayet
28	DF	USA	Wyatt Meyer
29	DF	USA	Santiago Hopkins
30	DF	ENG	Joe Chalwin
31	MF	USA	Israel Cortez
32	MF	USA	Matthew McGrew
33	DF	USA	Beau Morrison
34	DF	USA	Arseni Metelista
35	MF	USA	Adrian Jacobs
37	DF	USA	Federico Barbieri
39	FW	USA	Michael Luckhurst
66	MF	USA	Noe Aubanel
99	GK	USA	Zack Andoh
99	GK	USA	Thomas Grimes

=== Notable former players ===
- Steve Birnbaum (Note: 2011 and 2013 All-Pac-12 first team, 2011 Jewish Sports Review first-team All-American, National Soccer Coaches Association of America (NSCAA) 2013 First Team All-American, and NSCAA 2013 First Team All-Far-West Team.)
- Drake Callender
- Calen Carr
- Taylor Davila
- Christian Dean
- Stefan Frei
- Sam Junqua
- Leo Krupnik (Note: (born 1979), Ukrainian-born American-Israeli former soccer player and current soccer coach.)
- Nick Lima
- Troy Roberts

=== Current professional players ===
As of February 27, 2025

- (United States) Eric Kronberg (2004–2005) – Currently assistant coach with Portland
- (Switzerland) Stefan Frei (2005–2008) – Currently with Seattle Sounders FC
- (United States) Hector Jiménez (2006–2010) – Currently assistant coach with Chicago Fire FC
- (United States) David Bingham (2008–2010) – Currently with Charlotte FC
- (United States) Alec Sundly (2010–2013) – Currently assistant coach with UC Davis
- (United States) Christian Dean (2011–2013) – Currently with Forward Madison FC
- (United States) Nick Lima (2013–2016) – Currently with San Jose Earthquakes
- (Mexico) José Carrera-García (2013–2017) – Currently with Forward Madison FC
- (United States) Jonathan Klinsmann (2015–2017) – Currently with Cesena FC
- (United States) Shinya Kadono (2015–2018) – Currently with Irvine Zeta FC
- (Japan) Sam Junqua (2015–2018) – Currently with Real Salt Lake
- (United States) Drake Callender (2016–2019) – Currently with Inter Miami CF
- (United States) Thomas Williamson (2017–2020) – Currently with Loudoun United FC
- (United States) Taylor Davila (2018–2020) – Currently with Louisville City FC

== Team management ==
Coaching staff
Manager	(United States) Leonard Griffin
Assistant manager	(United States) Ricardo Gutierrez
Assistant manager	(United States) Jake Wilson
Assistant manager	(United States) Henry Foulk

Last updated: February 27, 2025
Source: Cal Men's Soccer

=== Head coaching history ===
Years	Coach	Games	W	L	T	Pct.
1906–1911	(Records not kept)					
1912–1913	C.Y. Williamson	6	0	5	1	.083
1914–1915	G. DeGamendia	11	5	4	2	.546
1916	Carl Shafor	9	5	4	0	.556
1917	F.W. Cozens	4	3	1	0	.750
1920–1924	John Mathews	9	4	4	1	.500
1925–1931	Carl Zamloch	58	34	17	7	.647
1932	Reginald Downing	9	1	6	2	.222
1933–1951	Julius Schroeder	194	131	34	29	.750
1952–1980	Bob DiGrazia	374	202	133	39	.592
1981–1989	Bill Coupe	185	113	59	13	.646
1990–1992	Dave Chaplik	60	23	32	5	.425
1993–1999	Mark Mallon	135	62	60	13	.507
2000–2021	Kevin Grimes	241	131	80	30	.609
2022–	Leonard Griffin	53	18	22	13	.462

== NCAA tournament results ==
The Bears have made 19 NCAA Tournament appearances

Year	Record	Seed	Region	Round	Opponent	Results
1960	6–2	—N/a	St. Louis	Quarter-final	Saint Louis	L 0–2
1977	11–5–3	—N/a	San Francisco	Second round	UCLA	L 1–3
1981	13–5–1	—N/a	Berkeley	First round	San Diego State	L 0–4
1983	17–3	—N/a	Las Vegas	First round	UNLV	L 1–3 (OT)
1985	16–4–1	—N/a	Los Angeles	First round	UCLA	L 1–3
1986	15–4–2	—N/a	St. Louis	First round	Saint Louis	L 0–2
1996	12–6–2	—N/a	Seattle	First round	Fresno State	L 1–2
2001	10–8–1	—N/a	Stanford	First round	Santa Clara	L 0–1 (3OT)
2002	13–5–2	—N/a	Los Angeles	Second round Third round	UC Santa Barbara; UCLA	W 2–1; L 1–2
2003	10–8–2	—N/a	New York	First round Second round	San Jose State; UC Santa Barbara	W 2–0; L 0–2
2004	12–3–3	—N/a	Indianapolis	First round Second round	Santa Clara; No. 7 SMU	W 2–1 (OT); L 0–1
2005	13–3–2	No. 7	Albuquerque	Second round Third round Quarter-finals	Santa Clara; Wake Forest; No. 2 New Mexico	T 0–0 (PK); W 3–2 (2OT); L 0–1
2006	12–5–1	No. 13	Charlottesville	Second round Third round	New Mexico; No. 4 Virginia	W 3–1; L 1–2
2007	11–5–2	—N/a	Providence	First round Second round	UC Davis; No. 11 Virginia Tech	W 2–1 (OT); L 2–3
2008	11–5–2	—N/a	College Park	First round Second round Third round	San Francisco; No. 15 UC Santa Barbara; No. 2 Maryland	W 3–0; W 3–2 (2OT); L 1–2
2010	12–2–3	No. 6	Akron	Second round Third round Quarter-finals	Santa Barbara; Brown; No. 3 Akron	W 2–1 (OT); W 2–0; T 3–3 (PK)
2013	12–4–2	No. 4	Berkeley	Second round Third round Quarter-finals	Bradley; Coastal Carolina; No. 5 Maryland	W 3–1; W 1–0; W 1–0; L 1–2
2014	12–4–2	No. 15	Los Angeles	Second round Third round	SIU Edwardsville; No. 2 UCLA	W 1–0; L 2–3
2017	11–7–0	N/A	Berkeley	First round	San Francisco	L 1–2
2019	8–7–3	N/A	Santa Barbara	First round	Santa Barbara	L 1–3

== Honors ==
- California Intercollegiate Soccer Conference (5): 1936, 1937, 1938, 1946, 1947
- Mountain Pacific Sports Federation (1): 1996
- Pac-12 Conference (3): 2006, 2007, 2010
- Pacific Soccer Conference (1): 1983
