= Stanford Cardinal men's soccer =

American college soccer team

- 2026 Stanford Cardinal men's soccer team
- Founded: 1911; 115 years ago
- University: Stanford University
- Athletic director: John Donahoe
- Head coach: Jeremy Gunn
- Conference: ACC
- Location: Stanford, California, US
- Nickname: Cardinal
- Colors: Cardinal Red; White
Home	Away

Pre-tournament ASHA championships
- 1915, 1916, 1919, 1920, 1921, 1922

NCAA tournament championships
- 2015, 2016, 2017

NCAA tournament runner-up
- 1998, 2002

NCAA tournament College Cup
- 1998, 2001, 2002, 2015, 2016, 2017, 2019

NCAA tournament Quarterfinals
- 1998, 2001, 2002, 2015, 2016, 2017, 2018, 2023

NCAA tournament Round of 16
- 1998, 2001, 2002, 2015, 2016, 2017, 2018, 2019, 2023, 2024, 2025

NCAA tournament appearances
- 1962, 1978, 1991, 1992, 1997, 1998, 1999, 2000, 2001, 2002, 2009, 2013, 2014, 2015, 2016, 2017, 2018, 2019, 2020, 2023, 2024, 2025

Conference regular season championships
- 1931, 1962, 1963, 1997, 2001, 2014, 2015, 2016, 2017, 2018, 2020

The Stanford Cardinal men's soccer team represents Stanford University in all NCAA Division I men's college soccer competitions. The Cardinal play in the ACC. Their first season as a varsity program was in 1973.

== History ==
Roots to a Stanford's first soccer team can be traced to November 16, 1909, when a notice was published in The Daily Palo Alto, now The Stanford Daily:

It has been decided by Instructors Long and Maloney of the Hygiene department to organize soccer teams from the various gymnasium classes. The men have shown such a decided interest in the soccer as played during the gymnasium hours that it was suggested by certain members of the classes that permanent teams be organized.

The article also stated that "good soccer players usually make good rugby players". That announcement came after the 1905 Big Game at Stanford Field, when Stanford president David Starr Jordan and Cal president Benjamin Ide Wheeler held a secret meeting in response to the increasing complains about the brutality of American football. In the meeting, both presidents determined that Stanford and Cal would abolish football, and did so. From then on, both schools switched to rugby, which was the code of football played until 1919 when American football returned.

Harry Wilfred Maloney, hired by Stanford at age 32 in 1908 as an assistant instructor at Encina Gymnasium, (Note: Maloney was not only Stanford’s first varsity soccer coach but also men’s basketball, boxing (1916–1937), fencing coach. He also coached rugby, track and field (1920) and wrestling (1921–1922). His 104 soccer coaching victories (104–60–40 overall) remain No. 2 all-time at Stanford. Maloney went 49–38–2 in 22 seasons as the fencing coach between 1916–1940. Maloney was also president of the California Rugby Union president, he was selected the 1920 Olympic gold-medal-winning rugby team.) saw soccer as a way to help fuel the rugby program used in those years. The first version of a Stanford soccer team carried a heavy rugby influence, with H.L. Hubbard appointed as Stanford soccer's first captain. Benny Erb shone as the team's first star. The first team were called the Stanford's Reds, played a series of exhibition matches.

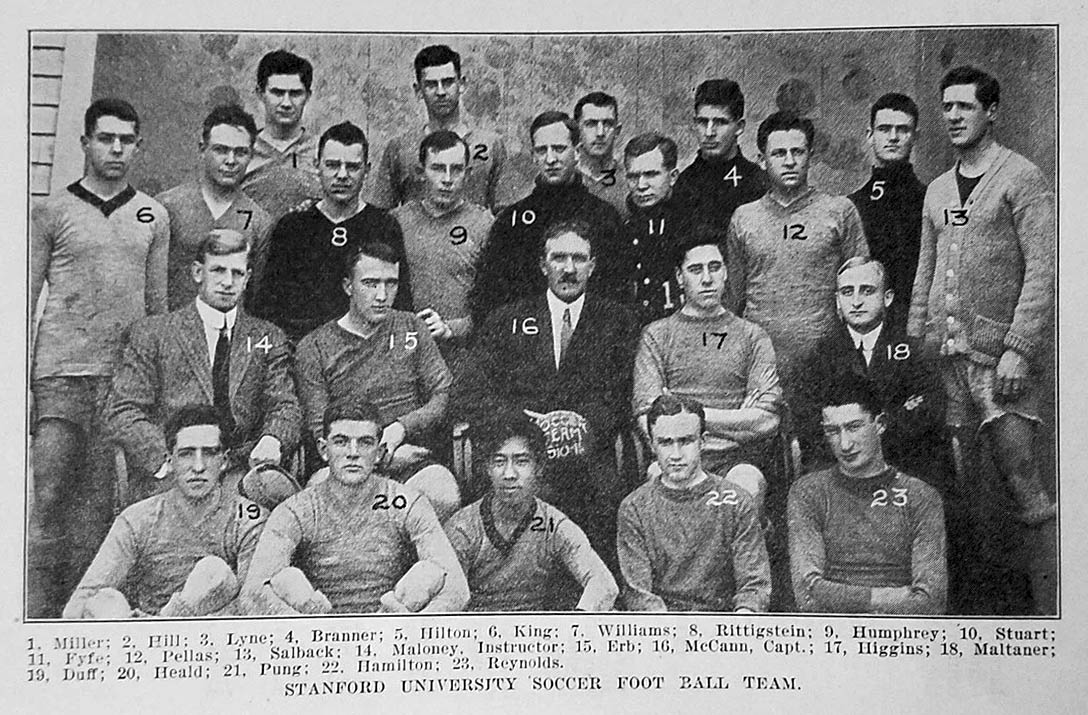
Stanford team of 1910

The first soccer match between Stanford and Cal was on March 5, 1910, and won by Cal 1–0 in front of 2,000 spectators in Berkeley. Cal's team just learned the rules of soccer in the run-up to the match and used the sport as a training method for rugby. Other matches played by Stanford were vs Bobby Burns (a team named after a Scottish poet) (3–3), and the San Francisco's Olympic Club (4–1), English Warship (sailors from the sloop-of-war HMS Shearwater. The team played other matches to complete a 2–3–2 season, being invited to join The California Football League

With a budget of $210, Stanford played a 14-match league schedule in 1910-11, finishing fifth and reaching the cup semifinals before losing to the Vampires. After the season concluded, The Stanford Quad wrote:

Considering the short time they have had to learn the game from its very rudiments, these teams have done remarkably well, especially when it is considered that in most of their matches they have been playing with teams which have been practicing the game for years.

The program was granted varsity status in 1911 and Maloney remained as coach for 29 years (1908–1944). He achieved a 104–60–40 record, ranking #3 in program history in coaching victories as of 2021. The Stanford soccer venue was renamed Maloney Field in 1941, and then rededicated in 1966.

The Cardinal have appeared in the NCAA Division I Men's Soccer Tournament 19 times since 1973, including 14 times in the 23 seasons from 1997 to 2019. They have made five appearances in the College Cup, including winning the 2015, 2016, and 2017 national championships, only the second time ever that a program won three consecutive championships (Virginia won four from 1991 to 1994).

== Players ==
=== Current roster ===
As of November 6, 2026

Note: Flags indicate national team as defined under FIFA eligibility rules; some limited exceptions apply. Players may hold more than one non-FIFA nationality.

No.	Pos.	Nation	Player
1	GK	USA	Rowan Schnebly
2	MF	USA	Brad Bennett
4	DF	USA	Dylan Groeneveld
6	MF	USA	Joshua Partal
7	MF	USA	Jude Stone
8	MF	USA	Jack Pymm
9	FW	USA	Trevor Islam
10	MF	USA	Alex Chow
13	MF	USA	TJ Kahoalii
14	FW	USA	Jayden Fitzgerald Boes
15	DF	USA	Hugo Berg
16	DF	USA	Maximo Nystrom
17	MF	CAN	Tim Fortier
18	DF	USA	Alex Ling

No.	Pos.	Nation	Player
19	MF	USA	Tim Logan
20	FW	USA	Logan Tsopanoglou
21	MF	USA	Dillon Logan
22	MF	JPN	Yujin Kikuchi
23	DF	USA	Victor Fung
24	DF	USA	Aidan Reilly
25	DF	USA	Joe Moyer
26	FW	USA	Calder Zirn
28	FW	USA	Eric Frintu
29	FW	USA	Carson Sagely
30	GK	USA	Jordan Victor
31	GK	USA	Bennett Ewing
32	GK	USA	Brayden Montague

=== Current professional players ===
As of March 7, 2025

- (Scotland) Jamie Clark (1997–1998) – Currently head coach of Washington Huskies
- Jordan Morris (2013–2015) – Currently with Seattle Sounders FC and United States international
- (United States) Corey Baird (2014–2017) – Currently with FC Cincinnati
- (United States) Drew Skundrich (2014–2017) – Currently with Loudoun United FC
- (United States) Tanner Beason (2016–2019) – Currently with New England Revolution
- (United States) Derek Waldeck (2016–2019) – Currently with Spokane Velocity
- (United States) Zach Ryan (2017–2021) – Currently with Loudoun United FC
- (United States) Alex Rando (2019) – Currently with New York City FC
- Ousseni Bouda (2019–2021) – Currently with San Jose Earthquakes and Burkina Faso international
- (United States) Keegan Hughes (2019–2021) – Currently with New England Revolution II
- (United States) Gabriel Segal (2019–2021) – Currently with Houston Dynamo FC
- (United States) Keegan Tingey (2019–2021) – Currently with Loudoun United FC
- (Canada) Mark Fisher (2020–2023) – Currently with Toronto FC II
- (United States) Will Reilly (2021–2024) – Currently with Atlanta United FC

== Coaches ==
=== Current staff ===
As of September 25, 2024

Name	Position	Seasons
Jeremy Gunn	Head coach	13th
Ben Moane	Assistant coach	5th
Jack Winter	Assistant coach	2nd
Kevin McCarthy	Assistant coach	1st

== Honours ==
=== National championships ===
- NCAA Division I tournament (3): 2015, 2016, 2017

=== Conference championships ===
- Pac-12 Conference (7): 2001, 2014, 2015, 2016, 2017, 2018, 2020
- Mountain Pacific Sports Federation (1): 1997
- Northern California Intercollegiate Soccer Conference (2): 1962, 1963
- University and Club Soccer League (6): 1915, 1916, 1919, 1920, 1921, 1922
- California Intercollegiate Soccer Conference (1): 1931

== Yearly records ==
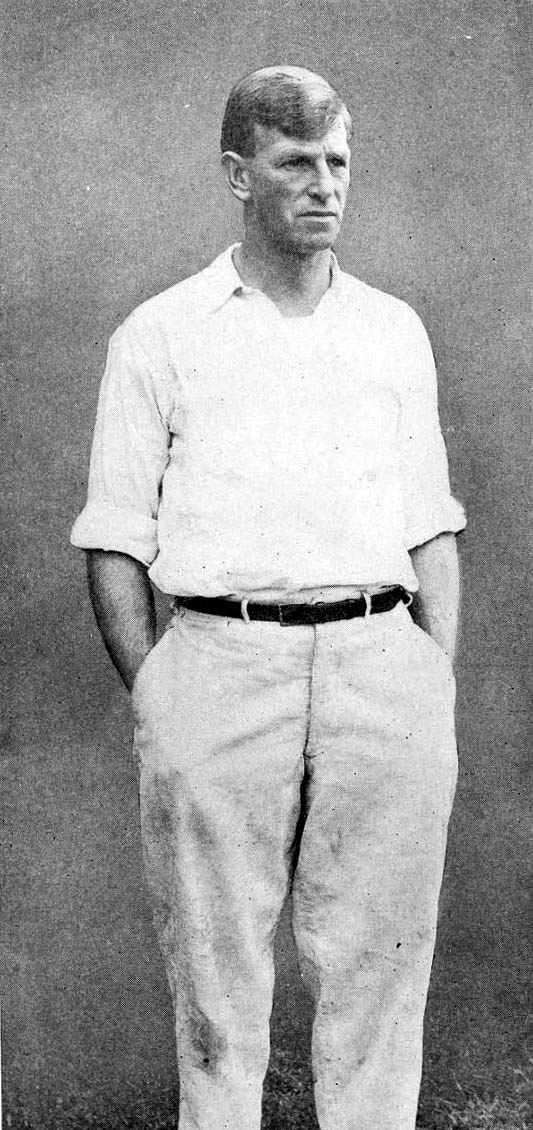
Harry Maloney was Stanford's coach from 1908 until his retirement in 1944

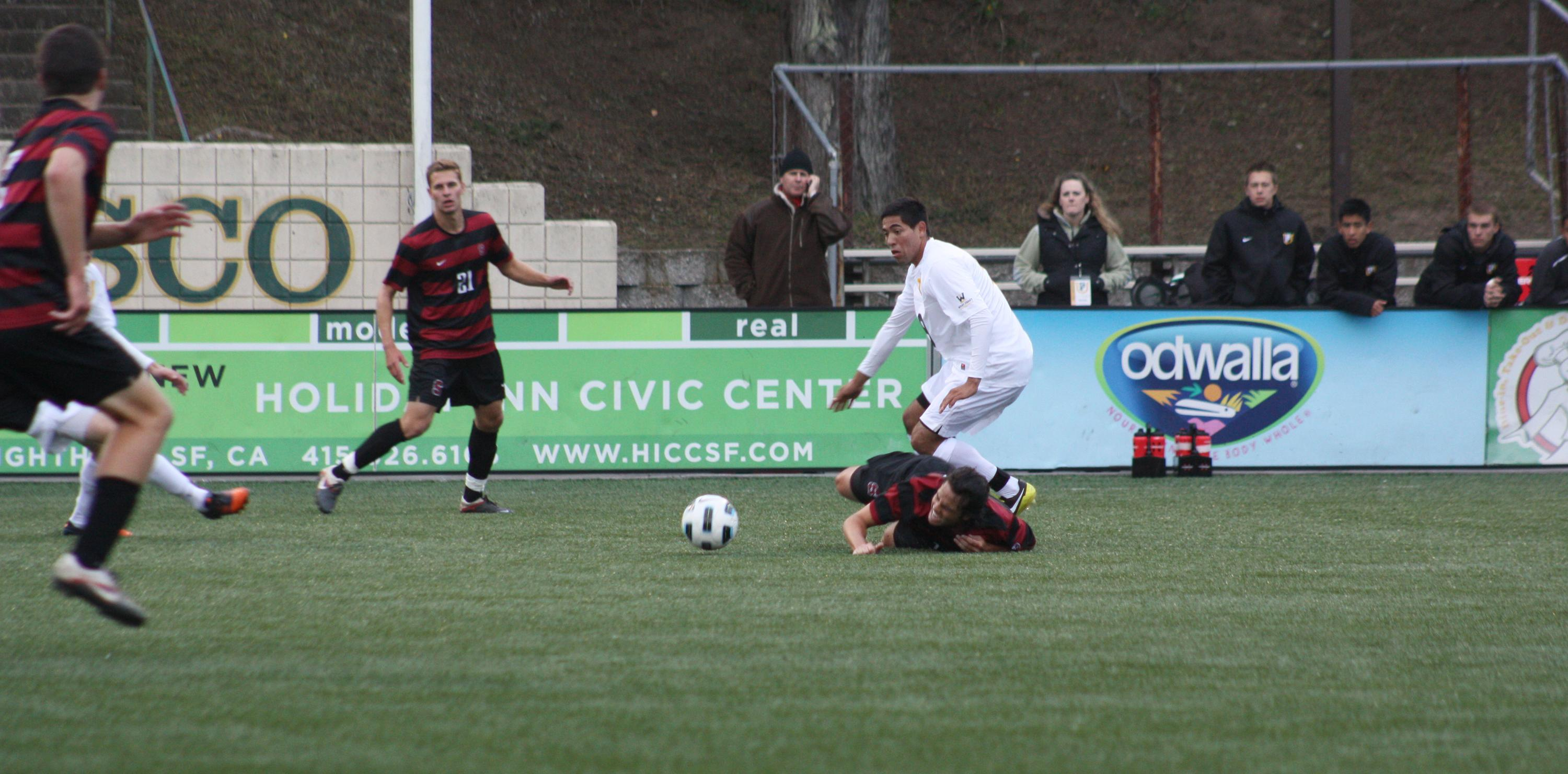
Stanford (scarlet and black) v USF Dons in 2012

Season	Coach	Overall	Conference	Standing	Postseason
Harry Maloney (University and Club Soccer League) (1911–1917)
1911	Harry Maloney	3–0–0	–		
1912	Harry Maloney	2–0–1	–		
1913	Harry Maloney	1–0–2	–		
1914	Harry Maloney	2–0–0	–		
1915	Harry Maloney	6–2–0	–	1st	
1916	Harry Maloney	6–3–1	–	1st	
1917	Harry Maloney	1–1–0	–		
E. R. Knollin (University and Club Soccer League) (1918–1918)
1918	E. R. Knollin	0–2–0	–		
E. R. Knollin:		0–2–0 (.000)	–		
Harry Maloney (University and Club Soccer League) (1919–1924)
1919	Harry Maloney	6–2–2	–	1st	
1920	Harry Maloney	1–0–1	–	1st	
1921	Harry Maloney	2–1–0	–	1st	
1922	Harry Maloney	2–0–0	–	1st	
1923	Harry Maloney	8–6–2	–		
1924	Harry Maloney	2–3–2	–		
Don Clark (University and Club Soccer League) (1925–1925)
1925	Don Clark	5–1–2	–		
Don Clark:		5–1–2 (.750)	–		
Harry Maloney (California Intercollegiate Soccer Conference) (1926–1934)
1926	Harry Maloney	0–1–1	–		
1927	Harry Maloney	1–2–0	–		
1928	Harry Maloney	2–3–0	–		
1929	Harry Maloney	1–3–2	–		
1930	Harry Maloney	4–4–2	–		
1931	Harry Maloney	8–0–2	–	1st	
1932	Harry Maloney	4–2–3	–		
1933	Harry Maloney	4–2–3	–		
1934	Harry Maloney	1–6–0	–		
Richard Bullis (California Intercollegiate Soccer Conference) (1935–1935)
1935	Richard Bullis	4–5–1	–		
Richard Bullis:		4–5–1 (.450)	–		
Harry Maloney (California Intercollegiate Soccer Conference) (1936–1942)
1936	Harry Maloney	3–3–3	–		
1937	Harry Maloney	6–3–1	–		
1938	Harry Maloney	5–4–1	–		
1939	Harry Maloney	9–3–1	–		
1940	Harry Maloney	7–2–2	–		
1941	Harry Maloney	5–2–5	–		
1942	Harry Maloney	2–2–3	–		
Harry Maloney:		104–60–40 (.608)	–		
No Team (-) (1943–1945)
1943	No Team				
1944	No Team				
1945	No Team				
Cornelius Warmerdam (California Intercollegiate Soccer Conference) (1946–1946)
1946	Cornelius Warmerdam	3–2–0	–		
Cornelius Warmerdam:		3–2–0 (.600)	–		
David Tappan (California Intercollegiate Soccer Conference) (1947–1947)
1947	David Tappan	1–2–1	–		
David Tappan:		1–2–1 (.375)	–		
John H. Segel (California Intercollegiate Soccer Conference) (1948–1948)
1948	John H. Segel	3–5–1	–		
John H. Segel:		3–5–1 (.389)	–		
Etem Barlas (California Intercollegiate Soccer Conference) (1949–1949)
1949	Etem Barlas	0–6–1	–		
Etem Barlas:		0–6–1 (.071)	–		
Robert Graham (California Intercollegiate Soccer Conference) (1950–1950)
1950	Robert Graham	2–4–1	–		
Robert Graham:		2–4–1 (.357)	–		
Leo Weinstein (California Intercollegiate Soccer Conference) (1951–1953)
1951	Leo Weinstein	7–4–1	–		
1952	Leo Weinstein	6–2–2	–		
1953	Leo Weinstein	5–3–2	–		
Leo Weinstein:		18–9–5 (.641)	–		
Fred Priddle (California Intercollegiate Soccer Conference) (1954–1964)
1954	Fred Priddle	2–3–1	–		
1955	Fred Priddle	4–3–1	–		
1956	Fred Priddle	5–5–0	–		
1957	Fred Priddle	4–4–1	–		
1958	Fred Priddle	3–5–1	–		
1959	Fred Priddle	5–3–0	–		
1960	Fred Priddle	6–3–0	–		
1961	Fred Priddle	4–5–2	–		
1962	Fred Priddle	8–2–0	–	1st	NCAA Division I First Round
1963	Fred Priddle	9–2–0	–	1st	
1964	Fred Priddle	10–3–1	–		
Fred Priddle (West Coast Intercollegiate Soccer Conference) (1965–1975)
1965	Fred Priddle	4–7–0	–		
1966	Fred Priddle	6–4–1	–		
1967	Fred Priddle	3–7–2	–		
1968	Fred Priddle	4–10–0	1–4–0	6th	
1969	Fred Priddle	8–7–0	3–3–0	4th	
1970	Fred Priddle	10–5–2	2–3–1	5th	
1971	Fred Priddle	6–7–3	1–4–1	5th	
1972	Fred Priddle	9–7–1	1–3–1	4th	
1973	Fred Priddle	10–5–2	1–2–2	4th	
1974	Fred Priddle	8–10–3	2–2–1	4th	
1975	Fred Priddle	5–12–2	1–4–0		
Fred Priddle:		133–119–23 (.525)	12–25–6 (.349)		
Nelson Lodge (Pacific Coast Conference) (1976–1983)
1976	Nelson Lodge	9–10–2	2–2–1		
1977	Nelson Lodge	9–8–2	2–2–1	3rd	
1978	Nelson Lodge	16–6–0	4–3–0	3rd	NCAA Division I Second Round
1979	Nelson Lodge	14–5–2	5–2–0	3rd	
1980	Nelson Lodge	10–10–1	5–2–0	3rd	
1981	Nelson Lodge	12–7–2	2–5–0	6th	
1982	Nelson Lodge	13–5–3	3–1–2		
1983	Nelson Lodge	12–5–3	3–3–1		
Nelson Lodge:		95–56–15 (.617)	26–20–5 (.559)		
Sam Koch (Pacific Coast Conference) (1984–1989)
1984	Sam Koch	11–7–3	4–3–0		
1985	Sam Koch	12–6–3	6–1–0	2nd	
1986	Sam Koch	6–11–4	1–4–1	5th	
1987	Sam Koch	9–9–3	3–3–0	3rd	
1988	Sam Koch	12–9–1	3–3–0		
1989	Sam Koch	8–11–2	1–3–2		
Sam Koch:		58–53–16 (.520)	18–17–3 (.513)		
Colin Lindores (No Conference) (1990–1991)
1990	Colin Lindores	9–6–6	–		
1991	Colin Lindores	12–4–5	–		NCAA Division I First Round
Colin Lindores (Mountain Pacific Sports Federation) (1992–1995)
1992	Colin Lindores	11–8–2	5–2–0	2nd	NCAA Division I First Round
1993	Colin Lindores	8–9–2	4–2–1	2nd	
1994	Colin Lindores	5–12–2	3–3–1		
1995	Colin Lindores	5–12–1	2–5–0	7th	
Colin Lindores:		50–51–19 (.496)	14–12–2 (.536)		
Bobby Clark (Mountain Pacific Sports Federation) (1996–1999)
1996	Bobby Clark	10–4–4	1–2–1	4th	
1997	Bobby Clark	13–5–2	3–0–1	T–1st	NCAA Division I First Round
1998	Bobby Clark	18–5–2	5–2–2	4th	NCAA Division I Runner-up
1999	Bobby Clark	12–4–3	5–1–1	2nd	NCAA First Round
Bobby Clark (Pacific-10 Conference) (2000–2000)
2000	Bobby Clark	18–3–1	6–2–0	2nd	NCAA Division I Third Round
Bobby Clark:		71–21–12 (.740)	20–7–5 (.703)		
Bret Simon (Pacific-10 Conference/Pac-12 Conference) (2001–2011)
2001	Bret Simon	19–2–1	6–1–1	1st	NCAA Division I National Semifinals
2002	Bret Simon	17–5–3	5–3–2	3rd	NCAA Division I Runner-up
2003	Bret Simon	3–15–2	0–10–0	6th	
2004	Bret Simon	7–6–5	2–4–2	4th	
2005	Bret Simon	4–11–3	1–7–2	6th	
2006	Bret Simon	7–7–4	5–3–2	3rd	
2007	Bret Simon	7–6–5	4–4–2	2nd	
2008	Bret Simon	4–11–3	2–6–2	6th	
2009	Bret Simon	12–6–2	4–4–2	3rd	NCAA Division I Regional Semifinals
2010	Bret Simon	8–10–0	4–6–0	4th	
2011	Bret Simon	6–10–2	3–6–1	4th	
Bret Simon:		94–89–30 (.512)	36–54–16 (.415)		
Jeremy Gunn (Pac-12 Conference) (2012–2023)
2012	Jeremy Gunn	9–8–1	5–4–1	3rd	
2013	Jeremy Gunn	10–7–4	3–5–2	4th	NCAA Division I Third Round
2014	Jeremy Gunn	13–3–3	6–1–3	1st	NCAA Division I Second Round
2015	Jeremy Gunn	18–2–3	7–1–2	1st	National Champions
2016	Jeremy Gunn	15–3–5	8–1–1	1st	National Champions
2017	Jeremy Gunn	19–2–2	9–0–1	1st	National Champions
2018	Jeremy Gunn	12–4–5	7–2–1	1st	NCAA Division I Quarterfinals
2019	Jeremy Gunn	14–3–5	6–2–2	2nd	NCAA Division I Semifinals
2020	Jeremy Gunn	10–3–1	7–2–1	1st	NCAA Division I Third Round
2021	Jeremy Gunn	6–6–6	2–4–4	4th	
2022	Jeremy Gunn	12–2–6	4–2–4	2nd	NCAA Division I Third Round
2023	Jeremy Gunn	11–4–5	3–2–5	4th	NCAA Division I Quarterfinals
Jeremy Gunn (Atlantic Coast Conference) (2024–present)
2024	Jeremy Gunn	9–5–6	3–2–3	7th	NCAA Division I Third Round
2025	Jeremy Gunn	14–4–2	5–2–1	2nd	NCAA Division I Third Round
Jeremy Gunn:		172–56–54 (.706)	75–30–31 (.665)		
Total:		813–541–221			
National champion Postseason invitational champion Conference regular season champion Conference regular season and conference tournament champion Division regular season champion Division regular season and conference tournament champion Conference tournament champion
