= San Diego State Aztecs men's soccer =

College men's soccer team

- Founded: 1968; 58 years ago
- University: San Diego State University
- Head coach: Ryan Hopkins (5th season)
- Conference: Pac-12
- Location: San Diego, California
- Stadium: SDSU Sports Deck (capacity: 3,000)
- Nickname: Aztecs
- Colors: Scarlet and black
Home	Away

NCAA tournament runner-up
- 1987

NCAA tournament College Cup
- 1987

NCAA tournament Quarterfinals
- 1987

NCAA tournament Round of 16
- 1987

NCAA tournament appearances
- 1969, 1981, 1982, 1987, 1988, 1989, 2005, 2006, 2016

The San Diego State Aztecs men's soccer team is the men's soccer program that represents San Diego State University (SDSU). The Aztecs compete in NCAA Division I as a member of the Pac-12 Conference. The team previously played as an affiliate member of the Western Athletic Conference. The team plays its home games at the SDSU Sports Deck.

== Postseason results ==
The San Diego State Aztecs have an NCAA Division I Men's Soccer Tournament record of 5–8 through eight appearances. The Aztecs also reached the tournament in 1981, though the result was vacated by the NCAA after it was revealed that the team fielded an ineligible player during the tournament.

Year	Round	Opponent	Result
1969	Second round	San Francisco	L 1–2
1982	First round Second round	Fresno State; San Francisco	W 1–0; L 0–2
1987	First round Second round Quarterfinals; Semifinals; National Championship	Saint Louis; SMU; UCLA; Harvard; Clemson	W 2–1; W 3–2; W 2–1; W 2–1; L 0–2
1988	First round	UCLA	L 1–2
1989	First round	UCLA	L 1–2
2005	First round	UC Santa Barbara	L 0–2
2006	First round	UC Santa Barbara	L 1–2
2016	First round	UNLV	L 1–2

== Head coaches ==
Head Coach	Seasons	Overall	Pct.
George Logan	1968–1981	148–48–17	.735
Chuck Clegg	1982–1999	194–134–39	.582
Lev Kirshner	2000–2019	142–179–57	.451
Ryan Hopkins	2020–present	20–30–13	.421

As of the 2024 Record Book

== Statistical leaders ==
=== Top goalscorers ===
Pos.	Player	Years	Goals
1	Kyle Whittemore	1984, 1986–1988	68
2	Micael Holmstedt	1979–1982	57
3	Steve Robertson	1974–1975	37
4	Eric Wynalda	1987–1989	34
4	Vidal Fernandez	1977–1979	34
6	Jim Tollerton	1969–1971	32
7	Choo Chowanda-Bandhu	1969–1972	31
8	Alan Kelly	1974–1977	28
9	Aaron Susi	1993–1996	25
9	Dida Mendes	1979–1982	25
9	Vince Bucelli	1979, 1981–1982	25

=== Assists leaders ===
Pos.	Player	Years	Goals
1	Dida Mendes	1979–1982	33
2	Choo Chowanda-Bandhu	1969–1972	31
3	Aaron Susi	1993–1996	28
3	Alan Kelly	1974–1977	28
5	Micael Holmstedt	1979–1982	27
6	Eric Wynalda	1987–1989	25
6	Eric Drabb	1984–1987	25
6	Vince Bucelli	1979, 1981–1982	25
9	Kyle Whittemore	1984, 1986–1988	24
10	Steve Boardman	1983–1986	22

== Notable alumni ==
- Jacob Castro, Seattle Sounders FC goalkeeper
- CJ Fodrey, Austin FC forward
- Rick Iversen, retired American soccer defender
- Dennis Sanchez, defender and captain
- Daniel Steres, Houston Dynamo defender
