= Buster Sjöberg =

Swedish soccer player (born 1999)

Personal information
- Date of birth: 4 April 1999 (age 27)
- Place of birth: Uppsala, Sweden
- Height: 1.96 m (6 ft 5 in)
- Position: Center-back

Youth career
- –2018: IK Sirius
- 2018–2019: Gamla Upsala SK

College career
Years	Team	Apps	(Gls)
2019–2021	Wofford Terriers	26	(2)
2021–2023	Syracuse Orange	55	(2)

Senior career*
Years	Team	Apps	(Gls)
2019	Gamla Upsala SK	12	(0)
2021	South Carolina United	7	(1)
2022	One Knoxville	6	(1)
2024	Whitecaps FC 2	22	(0)
- * Club domestic league appearances and goals as of 2 March 2023

Buster Valdemar Vitalis Sjöberg (born April 1999) is a Swedish professional footballer.

== Playing career ==
Sjöberg was born to Kjell and Katarina Sjoberg in Uppsala, Sweden and attended Celsiusskolan school. He played for IK Sirius's youth teams and Gamla Upsala SK.

=== College ===
During his freshman year in 2019, Sjöberg played for Wofford College and started in all 26 of his appearances. After two season he transferred to Syracuse and across two seasons with the Orange, Sjöberg started in 34 games out of 36 total appearances.

At the end of the 2022 season, he was part of the 2022 Syracuse Orange men's soccer team that won NCAA National Championship.

=== Semi-pro clubs ===
Sjöberg played for SC United Bantams of USL League Two in 2021 and One Knoxville SC in 2022, winning the Southern Division with both teams.

=== Vancouver Whitecaps FC ===
Sjöberg was selected by the Vancouver Whitecaps FC as the 71st overall pick in the 2023 MLS SuperDraft.

== Honours ==
Syracuse University

- Atlantic Division regular season: 2022
- ACC men's soccer tournament: 2022
- NCAA Division I men's soccer tournament: 2022

Individual

- 2023: ACC Championship all tournament team
- 2022: Academic All-District Team
- 2022: All-ACC Academic Team
- 2021: All-ACC Academic Team
- 2020: Southern Conference All-Academic Team, All-Southern Conference First Team, Southern Conference Academic Honor Roll
- 2019: Southern Conference All-Freshman Team and All-Southern Conference Second Team, Southern Conference Academic Honor Roll
