= 2022 ACC tournament =

2022 ACC tournament may refer to:

- 2022 ACC men's basketball tournament
- 2022 ACC women's basketball tournament
- 2022 ACC men's soccer tournament
