= 2022 Duke Blue Devils men's soccer team =

American college soccer season

2022 Duke Blue Devils men's soccer

NCAA Tournament, Quarterfinals
- Conference: Atlantic Coast Conference
- U. Soc. Coaches poll: No. 3
- TopDrawerSoccer.com: No. 8
- Record: 13–2–4 (5–0–3 ACC)
- Head coach: John Kerr (15th season)
- Assistant coaches: Michael Brady (15th season); Kyle Renfro (3rd season)
- Home stadium: Koskinen Stadium

2022 ACC men's soccer standings
	Conf.					Overall
Team	W		L		T	W		L		T
Atlantic
No. 1 Syracuse ‡	5	–	1	–	2	18	–	2	–	5
No. 24 Wake Forest +	5	–	3	–	0	14	–	6	–	0
Louisville +	4	–	3	–	1	9	–	6	–	3
No. 13 Clemson +	3	–	4	–	1	13	–	7	–	1
Boston College	1	–	4	–	3	4	–	7	–	5
NC State	1	–	5	–	2	6	–	7	–	5
Coastal
No. 3 Duke +	5	–	0	–	3	13	–	2	–	4
No. 16 Virginia +	5	–	1	–	2	10	–	4	–	5
No. 8 Pittsburgh +	3	–	2	–	3	12	–	5	–	5
North Carolina +	2	–	2	–	4	8	–	6	–	5
Notre Dame	3	–	4	–	1	8	–	7	–	2
Virginia Tech	0	–	8	–	0	3	–	14	–	1
‡ – ACC Tournament champion + – Also invited to the 2022 NCAA tournament; As of December 13, 2022; Rankings from United Soccer Coaches; Source: The ACC

The 2022 Duke Blue Devils men's soccer team represented Duke University during the 2022 NCAA Division I men's soccer season. The Blue Devils were led by head coach John Kerr, in his fifteenth season. They played their home games at Koskinen Stadium. The team was founded in 1935 and currently plays in the Atlantic Coast Conference.

The Blue Devils finished the season 13–2–4 overall and 5–0–3 in ACC play to finish in first place in the Coastal Division. As the first overall seed in the ACC Tournament, the received a bye into the Quarterfinals where they were upset at home by eighth seed Clemson. They received an at-large bid to the NCAA Tournament and were awarded the seventh overall seed. Being a seeded team, they received a bye into the Second Round where they defeated Denver and then FIU in the Third Round before being upset by unseeded Creighton in the Quarterfinals.

== Background ==
The Blue Devils finished the season 14–5–1 overall and 5–2–1 in ACC play to finish in a tie for first place in the Coastal Division. As the third overall seed in the ACC Tournament, the received a bye into the Quarterfinals where they defeated Wake Forest and then defeated Clemson in the Semifinals. They fell in the final to Notre Dame. They received an at-large bid to the NCAA Tournament and were awarded the seventh seed. Being a seeded team, they received a bye into the Second Round where they defeated UCLA before losing to tenth seeded Saint Louis in the Third Round.

== Player movement ==
=== Players leaving ===
Departures
Name	Number	Pos.	Height	Weight	Year	Hometown	Reason for Departure
Mateo Cornejo	2	MF	5'10"	165	Graduate Student	Cary, North Carolina	Graduated
Thorleifur Úlfarsson	7	FW	6'1"	165	Sophomore	Reykjavík, Iceland	Drafted 4th overall in the 2022 MLS SuperDraft
Ian Murphy	13	DF	6'2"	175	Senior	Redlands, California	Graduated; Drafted 14th overall in the 2022 MLS SuperDraft
Connor Kelly	22	MF	5'10"	160	Senior	Rumson, New Jersey	Graduated
JT Harms	23	GK	6'1"	180	Sophomore	Whitefish Bay, Wisconsin	Transferred to Indiana
Carter Cribbs	24	MF	5'9"	145	Freshman	New York, New York	—

=== Players arriving ===
==== Incoming transfers ====
Incoming transfers
Name	Number	Pos.	Height	Weight	Year	Hometown	Previous School
Peter Wentzel	31	GK	6'3"	205	Graduate Student	Ettlingen, Germany	Elon

==== Recruiting class ====
Name	Nat.	Hometown	Club	TDS Rating
Kamran Acito; DF	USA	Manhattan, New York	NYCFC Academy	3/5 stars
Bryce Barnum; FW	USA	League City, Texas	Houston Dynamo Academy	3/5 stars
Wayne Frederick; DF	TRI	Cabin John, Maryland	Bethesda SC Academy	4/5 stars
Kenan Hot; MF	USA	Lincroft, New Jersey	NYCFC Academy	4/5 stars
Drew Kerr; MF	USA	Hillsborough, North Carolina	North Carolina FC Youth	4/5 stars
Jose Ortega; FW	USA	Bethesda, Maryland	Bethesda SC	3/5 stars

== Squad ==
=== Roster ===
As of January 26, 2023

Note: Flags indicate national team as defined under FIFA eligibility rules; some limited exceptions apply. Players may hold more than one non-FIFA nationality.

No.	Pos.	Nation	Player
0	GK	USA	Grant Farley
1	GK	USA	Eliot Hamill
2	DF	USA	Amir Daley
3	DF	USA	Kamran Acito
4	DF	NIR	Lewis McGarvey
5	MF	USA	Antino Lopez
6	MF	USA	Cameron Kerr
7	MF	USA	Felix Barajas
8	MF	USA	Peter Stroud
9	FW	USA	Scotty Taylor
10	MF	USA	Nick Pariano
11	FW	BER	Jai Bean
12	MF	USA	Ruben Mesalles
13	MF	USA	Josh Kim
14	MF	GHA	Shak Mohammed
15	FW	USA	Krew Verratti

No.	Pos.	Nation	Player
16	MF	USA	Luke Thomas
17	MF	JPN	Santa Ihara
19	DF	USA	Sintayehu Clements
20	MF	USA	Carl Fisher
21	MF	USA	Daniel Aguilar
22	MF	USA	Drew Kerr
23	MF	USA	Kenan Hot
24	DF	ISL	Axel Gudbjornsson
25	FW	USA	Miguel Ramirez
26	MF	TRI	Wayne Frederick
27	FW	USA	Jose Ortega
28	MF	USA	Sebastian Docters
29	DF	USA	Nate Mulvaney
30	FW	ENG	Alex Bonnington
31	GK	GER	Peter Wentzel
32	MF	USA	Jackson Lagos

=== Team management ===
Position	Staff
Athletic Director	(United States) Nina King
Head coach	(United States) John Kerr
Associate head coach	(England) Michael Brady
Assistant Coach	(United States) Kyle Renfro
Volunteer assistant coach	(United States) Tristan Wierbonski

== Schedule ==
Date Time, TV	Rank^{#}	Opponent^{#}	Result	Record	Site (Attendance) City, State
Exhibition
August 13*; 6:00 p.m.	No. 12	South Carolina	T 1–1	—	Stone Stadium; Columbia, SC
August 16*; 7:00 p.m.	No. 12	High Point	W 3–0	—	Koskinen Stadium; Durham, NC
August 19*; 7:00 p.m.	No. 12	Longwood	W 7–1	—	Koskinen Stadium; Durham, NC
Regular season
August 26*; 7:30 p.m., ACCNX	No. 12	San Diego	W 1–0	1–0–0	Koskinen Stadium (587); Durham, NC
August 28*; 2:30 p.m., ACCNX	No. 12	Milwaukee	W 4–0	2–0–0	Koskinen Stadium (372); Durham, NC
September 1*; 5:00 p.m., ACCNX	No. 17	Michigan	W 3–0	1–0–0	Koskinen Stadium (416); Durham, NC
September 10; 7:30 p.m., ACCNX	No. 7	at Louisville	W 2–1	4–0–0 (1–0–0)	Lynn Stadium (1,033); Louisville, KY
September 16; 7:00 p.m., ACCNX	No. 5	North Carolina; Rivalry	T 1–1	4–0–1 (1–0–1)	Koskinen Stadium (3,155); Durham, NC
September 20*; 7:00 p.m., FloSports	No. 7	at Elon	W 1–0	5–0–1	Koskinen Stadium (909); Durham, NC
September 24; 7:00 p.m., ACCNX	No. 7	Boston College	W 1–0	6–0–1 (2–0–1)	Koskinen Stadium (1,934); Durham, NC
September 27*; 7:00 p.m., ACCNX	No. 4	Yale	T 1–1	6–0–2	Koskinen Stadium (467); Durham, NC
October 1; 7:00 p.m., ACCNX	No. 4	at No. 1 Wake Forest	W 3–2	7–0–2 (3–0–1)	Spry Stadium (3,630); Winston–Salem, NC
October 4*; 7:00 p.m., ACCNX	No. 2	Howard	W 2–0	8–0–2	Koskinen Stadium (579); Durham, NC
October 7; 7:00 p.m., ACCNX	No. 2	at No. 21 Virginia	T 0–0	8–0–3 (3–0–2)	Klöckner Stadium (3,830); Charlottesville, VA
October 14; 6:00 p.m., ACCN	No. 3	at Notre Dame	W 2–0	9–0–3 (4–0–2)	Alumni Stadium (1,643); Notre Dame, IN
October 18*; 7:00 p.m., ACCNX	No. 2т	George Washington	W 4–0	10–0–3	Koskinen Stadium (404); Durham, NC
October 21; 8:00 p.m., ACCN	No. 2т	Pittsburgh	T 0–0	10–0–4 (4–0–3)	Koskinen Stadium (877); Durham, NC
October 28; 6:00 p.m., ACCN	No. 3	at Virginia Tech	W 1–0	11–0–4 (5–0–3)	Thompson Field (1,360); Blacksburg, VA
ACC Tournament
November 6; 8:00 p.m., ACCN	(1) No. 3	(8) Clemson; Quarterfinals	L 0–2	11–1–4	Koskinen Stadium (1,164); Durham, NC
NCAA Tournament
November 20; 1:00 p.m., ESPN+	(7) No. 4	No. 9т Denver; Second Round	W 3–1	12–1–4	Koskinen Stadium (637); Durham, NC
November 27; 3:00 p.m., ESPN+	(7) No. 4	(10) No. 25 FIU; Third Round	W 1–0	13–1–4	Koskinen Stadium (572); Durham, NC
December 3; 1:00 p.m., ESPN+	(7) No. 4	Creighton; Quarterfinals	L 2–3	13–2–4	Koskinen Stadium (1,061); Durham, NC
*Non-conference game. ^{#}Rankings from United Soccer Coaches. (#) Tournament seedings in parentheses. All times are in Eastern.

== Awards and honors ==
Recipient	Award	Date	Ref.
Peter Stroud	Pre-Season ACC Watchlist	August 16	
Shak Mohammed	ACC Co-offensive Player of the Week	September 13	
Eliot Hammill	ACC Defensive Player of the Week	October 11	
Shak Mohammed	ACC Offensive Player of the Week	October 18	
Peter Stroud	ACC Midfielder of the Year	November 9	
Shak Mohammed	ACC Offensive Player of the Year	November 9	
Eliot Hamill	ACC Goalkeeper of the Year	November 9	
Kamran Acito	ACC Freshman of the Year	November 9	
Eliot Hamill	All-ACC First Team	November 9	
Shak Mohammed	All-ACC First Team	November 9	
Peter Stroud	All-ACC First Team	November 9	
Amir Daley	All-ACC Second Team	November 9	
Nick Pariano	All-ACC Second Team	November 9	
Antino Lopez	All-ACC Third Team	November 9	
Kamran Acito	ACC All-Freshman Team	November 9	
Axel Gubjornsson	ACC All-Freshman Team	November 9	
Kenan Hot	ACC All-Freshman Team	November 9	

== 2023 MLS Super Draft ==
Player	Team	Round	Pick #	Position
Shak Mohammed	Orlando City	1	2	FW

== Rankings ==
Ranking movements Legend: ██ Increase in ranking ██ Decrease in ranking т = Tied with team above or below ( ) = First-place votes
	Week																
Poll	Pre	1	2	3	4	5	6	7	8	9	10	11	12	13	14	15	Final
United Soccer	12	17	7	5	7	4	2 (2)	3 (1)	2т (1)	3 (1)	3	4	Not released				3
TopDrawer Soccer	11	6	3	2	4	3	2	2	2	2	2	4	5	4	3	3	8
