= 2022 Wake Forest Demon Deacons men's soccer team =

American college soccer season

2022 Wake Forest Demon Deacons men's soccer

NCAA Tournament, First Round
- Conference: Atlantic Coast Conference
- U. Soc. Coaches poll: No. 24
- Record: 14–6–0 (5–3–0 ACC)
- Head coach: Bobby Muuss (8th season)
- Assistant coaches: Steve Armas (8th season); Dane Brenner (12th season)
- Home stadium: Spry Stadium

2022 ACC men's soccer standings
	Conf.					Overall
Team	W		L		T	W		L		T
Atlantic
No. 1 Syracuse ‡	5	–	1	–	2	18	–	2	–	5
No. 24 Wake Forest +	5	–	3	–	0	14	–	6	–	0
Louisville +	4	–	3	–	1	9	–	6	–	3
No. 13 Clemson +	3	–	4	–	1	13	–	7	–	1
Boston College	1	–	4	–	3	4	–	7	–	5
NC State	1	–	5	–	2	6	–	7	–	5
Coastal
No. 3 Duke +	5	–	0	–	3	13	–	2	–	4
No. 16 Virginia +	5	–	1	–	2	10	–	4	–	5
No. 8 Pittsburgh +	3	–	2	–	3	12	–	5	–	5
North Carolina +	2	–	2	–	4	8	–	6	–	5
Notre Dame	3	–	4	–	1	8	–	7	–	2
Virginia Tech	0	–	8	–	0	3	–	14	–	1
‡ – ACC Tournament champion + – Also invited to the 2022 NCAA tournament; As of December 13, 2022; Rankings from United Soccer Coaches; Source: The ACC

The 2022 Wake Forest Demon Deacons men's soccer team represented Wake Forest University during the 2022 NCAA Division I men's soccer season. It was the 76th season of the university fielding a program. It was the program's eighth season with Bobby Muuss as head coach. The Demon Deacons played their home matches at Spry Stadium.

The Demon Deacons finished the season 14–6–0 overall and 5–3–0 in ACC play to finish in second place in the Atlantic Division. As the fourth overall seed in the ACC Tournament they defeated Virginia Tech in the Second Round before losing to Clemson in the Quarterfinals. They received an at-large bid to the NCAA Tournament. They were an unseeded team and lost to Ohio State in the First Round to end their season.

== Background ==
The Demon Deacons finished the season 13–7–1 overall and 4–3–1 in ACC play to finish in third place in the Atlantic Division. As the sixth overall seed in the ACC Tournament they defeated Virginia in the First Round before losing to Duke in the Quarterfinals. They received an at-large bid to the NCAA Tournament. They were an unseeded team and defeated Mercer in the First Round and thirteenth seed FIU in the Second Round before losing to fourth seed Notre Dame to end their season.

== Player movement ==
=== Players leaving ===
Departures
Name	Number	Pos.	Height	Weight	Year	Hometown	Reason for departure
Kyle Holcomb	7	FW	6'0"	165	Senior	San Marcos, California	Graduated, selected 29th overall in the 2022 MLS SuperDraft

=== Players arriving ===
==== Incoming transfers ====
Incoming transfers
Name	Number	Pos.	Height	Weight	Year	Hometown	Previous school
Sidney Paris	22	MF	5'9"	150	Junior	Oakville, Ontario	Navy

==== Recruiting class ====
Name	Nat.	Hometown	Club	TDS Rating
Devin Armstrong; GK	USA	Palm Harbor, Florida	Tampa Bay United Rowdies	3/5 stars
Cooper Flax; DF	USA	Dix Hills, New York	NYCFC Academy	4/5 stars
Samuel Jones; DF	USA	Portsmouth, Virginia	Philadelphia Union Academy	4/5 stars
Alec Kenison; DF	USA	San Diego, California	Olentangy Orange High School	4/5 stars
Nicholas Rabiu; FW	USA	Schenectady, New York	New York Red Bulls Academy	3/5 stars
Vladimir Walent; DF	USA	Lafayette, Colorado	Colorado Rapids Academy	4/5 stars
Aethan Yohannes; MF	USA	Springfield, Virginia	Laurel Springs High School	4/5 stars

== Squad ==
=== Roster ===
As of January 11, 2023

Note: Flags indicate national team as defined under FIFA eligibility rules; some limited exceptions apply. Players may hold more than one non-FIFA nationality.

No.	Pos.	Nation	Player
1	GK	USA	Trace Alphin
2	DF	USA	Bo Cummins
4	DF	USA	Alec Kenison
5	DF	USA	Samuel Jones
6	MF	USA	Aethan Yohannes
7	MF	USA	Nico Rabiu
8	FW	SEN	Babacar Niang
9	MF	USA	Roald Mitchell
10	MF	SWE	Oscar Sears
11	MF	USA	Leo Guarino
12	MF	USA	Takuma Suzuki
13	FW	USA	David Wrona
14	DF	USA	Jahlane Forbes
15	FW	USA	Mwinso Denkabe
16	DF	JPN	Hosei Kijima
17	MF	USA	Omar Hernandez

No.	Pos.	Nation	Player
18	MF	USA	Cooper Flax
19	DF	USA	Cristian Escribano
20	MF	USA	Ryan Fessler
21	FW	USA	Julian Kennedy
22	MF	PUR	Sidney Paris
23	DF	USA	Vlad Walent
24	MF	USA	Jake Swallen
25	MF	USA	Chase Oliver
26	MF	USA	Colin Thomas
27	DF	USA	Prince Amponsah
28	MF	USA	Nicolas Mancilla
30	GK	USA	Devin Armstrong
31	GK	USA	Cole McNally
32	DF	USA	Garrison Tubbs
33	DF	USA	Sebastian Scrivner

=== Team management ===
Position	Staff
Athletic Director	John Currie
Head coach	Bobby Muuss
Associate head coach	Steve Armas
Assistant Coach	Dane Brenner
Volunteer assistant coach	Ade Taiwo
Assistant Athletic Trainer	Michael White
Academic Counselor	Brooke Taylor
Sports Performance	David Bass

== Schedule ==
Date Time, TV	Rank^{#}	Opponent^{#}	Result	Record	Site (Attendance) City, State
Exhibition
August 14*; 6:00 p.m.	No. 15	at Coastal Carolina	T 1–1	–	Coastal Carolina University Soccer Field; Conway, SC
August 20*; 7:00 p.m.	No. 15	No. 6 West Virginia	T 0–0	–	Spry Stadium; Winston–Salem, NC
Regular season
August 25*; 8:00 p.m., ACCN	No. 15	UCF	W 1–0	1–0–0	Spry Stadium (1,733); Winston–Salem, NC
August 28*; 7:00 p.m., ACCNX	No. 15	Air Force	W 2–1	2–0–0	Spry Stadium (1,446); Winston–Salem, NC
September 3*; 8:00 p.m., ESPN+	No. 5	at UAB	W 2–0	3–0–0	PNC Field (315); Birmingham, AL
September 6*; 7:00 p.m., ACCNX	No. 4	Winthrop	W 5–1	4–0–0	Spry Stadium (1,020); Winston–Salem, NC
September 10; 7:00 p.m., ACCNX	No. 4	NC State	W 2–0	5–0–0 (1–0–0)	Spry Stadium (1,882); Winston–Salem, NC
September 13*; 7:00 p.m., ACCNX	No. 2т	Fairleigh Dickinson	W 3–2	6–0–0	Spry Stadium (1,457); Winston–Salem, NC
September 16; 7:30 p.m., ACCNX	No. 2т	at Virginia Tech	W 1–0	7–0–0 (2–0–0)	Thompson Field (2,350); Blacksburg, VA
September 20*; 7:00 p.m., ACCNX	No. 1	George Mason	W 6–1	8–0–0	Spry Stadium (1,794); Winston–Salem, NC
September 24; 7:00 p.m., ACCNX	No. 1	at No. 10 Clemson	W 6–1	9–0–0 (3–0–0)	Riggs Field (3,744); Clemson, SC
October 1; 7:00 p.m., ACCNX	No. 1	No. 4 Duke	L 2–3	9–1–0 (3–1–0)	Spry Stadium (3,630); Winston–Salem, NC
October 4*; 7:00 p.m., ACCNX	No. 4	Jacksonville	W 1–0	10–1–0	Spry Stadium (1,321); Winston–Salem, NC
October 7; 7:00 p.m., ACCNX	No. 4	at No. 7 Syracuse	L 0–2	10–2–0 (3–2–0)	SU Soccer Stadium (1,052); Syracuse, NY
October 11*; 6:00 p.m., FloSports	No. 10	at William & Mary	L 1–2	10–3–0	Albert–Daly Field (823); Williamsburg, VA
October 15; 7:00 p.m., ACCNX	No. 10	Boston College	W 3–1	11–3–0 (4–2–0)	Spry Stadium (2,133); Winston–Salem, NC
October 18*; 7:00 p.m., ACCNX	No. 25	Wofford	W 3–0	12–3–0	Spry Stadium (1,163); Winston–Salem, NC
October 22; 7:00 p.m., ACCNX	No. 25	at No. 24 Virginia	L 0–1	12–4–0 (4–3–0)	Klöckner Stadium (2,416); Charlottesville, VA
October 28; 8:00 p.m., ACCN		No. 9 Louisville	W 3–0	13–4–0 (5–3–0)	Spry Stadium (2,011); Winston–Salem, NC
ACC tournament
November 6; 2:00 p.m., ACCN	(4)	(12) Virginia Tech; Second Round	W 1–0	14–4–0	Spry Stadium (1,774); Winston–Salem, NC
November 9; 7:00 p.m., ACCN	(4) No. 20т	(8) No. 18т Clemson; Quarterfinals	L 0–2	14–5–0	Spry Stadium (1,729); Winston–Salem, NC
NCAA tournament
November 17; 6:00 p.m., ESPN+	No. 20т	No. 16т Ohio State; First Round	L 0–3	14–6–0	Spry Stadium (701); Winston–Salem, NC
*Non-conference game. ^{#}Rankings from United Soccer Coaches. (#) Tournament seedings in parentheses. All times are in Eastern.

== Awards and honors ==
Recipient	Award	Date	Ref.
Omar Hernandez	Pre-Season ACC Watchlist	August 16	
Prince Amponsah	ACC Defensive Player of the Week	September 6	
Roald Mitchell	ACC Co-offensive Player of the Week	September 13	
Garrison Tubbs	ACC Co-defensive Player of the Week	September 13	
Takuma Suzuki	ACC Defensive Player of the Week	November 1	
Garrison Tubbs	All-ACC Second Team	November 9	
Roald Mitchell	All-ACC Second Team	November 9	
Jahlane Forbes	All-ACC Third Team	November 9	
Babacar Niang	All-ACC Third Team	November 9	
Prince Amponsah	All-ACC Third Team	November 9	
Copper Flax	ACC All-Freshman Team	November 9	
Vlad Walent	ACC All-Freshman Team	November 9	

== Rankings ==
Ranking movements Legend: ██ Increase in ranking ██ Decrease in ranking — = Not ranked RV = Received votes т = Tied with team above or below ( ) = First-place votes
	Week																
Poll	Pre	1	2	3	4	5	6	7	8	9	10	11	12	13	14	15	Final
United Soccer	15	5	4	2т	1 (7)	1 (8)	4	10	25	RV	RV	20т	Not released				24
TopDrawer Soccer	19	7	4	3	1	1	4	8	17	19	17	13	—	—	—	—	—
