= Nathan Opoku =

Ghanaian footballer (born 2001)

Personal information
- Full name: Nathaniel Opoku Onyina
- Date of birth: 22 July 2001 (age 25)
- Place of birth: Accra, Ghana
- Height: 1.83 m (6 ft 0 in)
- Position: Forward

Team information
- Current team: Northampton Town

Youth career
- FDM Field Masters

College career
Years	Team	Apps	(Gls)
2021	Lindsey Wilson Blue Raiders	19	(19)
2022	Syracuse Orange	25	(11)

Senior career*
Years	Team	Apps	(Gls)
2022	Ventura County Fusion	16	(11)
2023–2026	Leicester City	0	(0)
2023–2024	→ OH Leuven (loan)	27	(5)
2025–2026	→ Newport County (loan)	30	(6)
2026–	Northampton Town	7	(1)
- * Club domestic league appearances and goals as of 12 November 2026 (UTC)

Nathaniel Opoku Onyina (born 22 July 2001) is a Ghanaian professional footballer who plays as a forward for EFL League Two club Northampton Town.

== Early life ==
Opoku started playing football in Ghana with the FDM Field Masters where he was a teammate of Kamal Sowah.

== Career ==
=== College in United States ===
Opoku played for Lindsey Wilson College in Columbia, Kentucky, where he scored 19 goals and five assists in 19 games in 2021.

In 2022, Opoku transferred to Syracuse University, where he became a prominent striker in the Atlantic Coast Conference under head coach Ian McIntyre. He helped Syracuse Orange men's soccer team win the National Championship in the 2022 NCAA Division I men's soccer tournament, scoring in the final before they defeated eight-time NCAA Champions Indiana 7–6 on penalties. He totaled 11 goals and eight assists in 25 matches for Syracuse. At the end of the 2022 season, Opoku was named to United Soccer Coaches’ Third-Team All-America and All-ACC First Team as well as he was the NCAA College Cup Most Outstanding Offensive Player, 2022 NCAA All-Tournament Team honoree.

=== Ventura County Fusion ===
Opoku played for Ventura County Fusion in USL League Two in 2022. He played and was named as the MVP as Fusion defeated the Long Island Rough Riders to win the USL League Two championship in 2022. Opoku scored 11 goals in 16 appearances in 2022 for Ventura County Fusion.

=== Leicester City ===
In January 2023, Opoku was reported to have signed for Premier League club Leicester City and loaned to Belgian club OH Leuven. According to Sky Sports News, Opoku rejected the opportunity to be a top pick in the 2023 MLS SuperDraft in favour of the European move. Opoku scored his first league goal for Leuven on April 8, 2023, in a 4–1 home win against KV Mechelen. In April 2024, he suffered a double leg fracture playing for Leuven against Westerlo.

On 1 September 2025, Opoku joined EFL League Two club Newport County on loan until January 2026. He scored his first goal for Newport on his debut five days later, coming on as a substitute for Matt Baker in the 64th-minute of a 3–2 home defeat to Bristol Rovers in the league. On 1 January 2026, his loan was extended until the end of the 2025–26 season.

=== Northampton Town ===
Opoku joined League Two club Northampton Town on 21 August 2026 for an undisclosed fee.

== Personal life ==
Opoku is from Accra, Ghana.

== Career statistics ==
As of match played 1 September 2026

Appearances and goals by club, season and competition
Club	Season	League			National Cup		League Cup		Others		Total	
Club	Season	Division	Apps	Goals	Apps	Goals	Apps	Goals	Apps	Goals	Apps	Goals
OH Leuven (loan)	2022–23	Belgian Pro League	7	3	0	0	—		—		7	3
OH Leuven (loan)	2023–24	Belgian Pro League	20	2	1	0	—		—		21	2
Newport County (loan)	2025–26	EFL League Two	30	6	1	0	—		2 (Note: Appearances in EFL Trophy)	0	33	6
Northampton Town	2026–27	EFL League Two	2	1	0	0	—		0	0	2	1
Career total			59	12	2	0	0	0	2	0	63	12

== Honours ==
Syracuse University

- Atlantic Division regular season: 2022
- ACC men's soccer tournament: 2022
- NCAA Division I men's soccer tournament: 2022

Ventura County Fusion

- USL League Two: 2022

Individual

- USL League Two Championship MVP: 2022
- USL League Two All-League Team: 2022
- USL League Two Western Conference Team: 2022
- NCAA Division I Most Outstanding Offensive Player: 2022
- NCAA All-Tournament Team: 2022
- All-ACC First Team: 2022
- NCAA Third Team All-America: 2022
