= 2022 Virginia Cavaliers men's soccer team =

American college soccer season

2022 Virginia Cavaliers men's soccer

NCAA Tournament, Second Round
- Conference: Atlantic Coast Conference
- Record: 10–4–5 (5–1–2 ACC)
- Head coach: George Gelnovatch (27th season)
- Assistant coaches: Matt Chulis (16th season); Adam Perron (3rd season)
- Home stadium: Klöckner Stadium

2022 ACC men's soccer standings
	Conf.					Overall
Team	W		L		T	W		L		T
Atlantic
No. 1 Syracuse ‡	5	–	1	–	2	18	–	2	–	5
No. 24 Wake Forest +	5	–	3	–	0	14	–	6	–	0
Louisville +	4	–	3	–	1	9	–	6	–	3
No. 13 Clemson +	3	–	4	–	1	13	–	7	–	1
Boston College	1	–	4	–	3	4	–	7	–	5
NC State	1	–	5	–	2	6	–	7	–	5
Coastal
No. 3 Duke +	5	–	0	–	3	13	–	2	–	4
No. 16 Virginia +	5	–	1	–	2	10	–	4	–	5
No. 8 Pittsburgh +	3	–	2	–	3	12	–	5	–	5
North Carolina +	2	–	2	–	4	8	–	6	–	5
Notre Dame	3	–	4	–	1	8	–	7	–	2
Virginia Tech	0	–	8	–	0	3	–	14	–	1
‡ – ACC Tournament champion + – Also invited to the 2022 NCAA tournament; As of December 13, 2022; Rankings from United Soccer Coaches; Source: The ACC

The 2022 Virginia Cavaliers men's soccer team represented the University of Virginia during the 2022 NCAA Division I men's soccer season. The Cavaliers were led by head coach George Gelnovatch, in his twenty-seventh season. They played their home games at Klöckner Stadium in Charlottesville, Virginia. This was the team's 82nd season playing organized men's college soccer and their 70th playing in the Atlantic Coast Conference.

The Cavaliers finished the season 10–4–5 overall and 5–1–2 in ACC play to finish in second place in the Coastal Division. As the third overall seed in the ACC Tournament they earned a first round bye, defeated Pittsburgh in the Quarterfinals but fell to Syracuse in the Semifinals in a penalty shoot-out. They received an at-large bid to the NCAA Tournament where they received a first round bye as the fourth overall seed but then lost in the Second Round to Marshall in another penalty shootout to end their season.

== Background ==
The Cavaliers finished the season 6–9–3 overall and 2–5–1 in ACC play to finish in sixth place in the Coastal Division. As the eleventh overall seed in the ACC Tournament they lost in the First Round to sixth seeded Wake Forest. They received did not receive an invite to the NCAA Tournament.

== Player movement ==
=== Players leaving ===
Departures
Name	Number	Pos.	Height	Weight	Year	Hometown	Reason for departure
Antonio Rodriguez	00	GK	6'0"	180	Sophomore	Bogota, Colombia	—
Oliver Gerbig	5	DF	6'2"	195	Senior	Taipei, Taiwan	Graduated
Jules Anderson	8	MF	5'9"	155	Junior	Ocean, New Jersey	Transferred to San Diego State
Nick Berghold	10	FW/MF	5'9"	165	(redshirt) Junior	Wingdale, New York	Graduated
Ank Nibogora	12	FW	5'10"	165	Sophomore	Kitchener, Ontario	Transferred to Saint John's
Kaya Ignacio	13	FW/MF	5'8"	160	Junior	Georgetown, Texas	Transferred to High Point
Rafael Caipo	15	MF/DF	6'1"	170	Sophomore	Lima, Peru	—
Julian Aguilar	16	MF	5'5"	138	Junior	Guatemala City, Guatemala	—
Chris Scheipe	19	MF/DF	5'9"	155	Junior	Duluth, Georgia	—
Jesper Moksnes	25	DF	6'2"	165	Freshman	Stavanger, Norway	Transferred to Duquesne
Malcolm Brickhouse	27	MF	5'11"	170	Freshman	Charlottesville, Virginia	—

=== Players arriving ===
==== Incoming transfers ====
Incoming transfers
Name	Number	Pos.	Height	Weight	Year	Hometown	Previous school
Aidan O'Connor	5	DF	6'3"	215	Junior	Grand Rapids, Michigan	Western Michigan
Moritz Kappelsberger	13	DF	6'3"	207	Graduate Student	Rosenheim, Germany	Wisconsin
Daniel Mangarov	16	MF	5'7"	146	Junior	Duluth, Georgia	UNC Greensboro
Axel Ahlander	24	MF	6'3"	190	Junior	Nøtterøy, Norway	James Madison
Truman Gelnovatch	35	FW	5'10"	185	Graduate Student	Miami, Florida	Princeton

==== Recruiting class ====
Name	Nat.	Hometown	Club	TDS Rating
Miguel Kobby Adoboe; MF	(United States)	Sachse, Texas	Sachse	3/5 stars
Triton Beauvois; FW	(United States)	Boston, Massachusetts	New England Revolution	3/5 stars
Colin Gallagher; GK	(United States)	Safety Harbor, Florida	Chargers SC	3/5 stars
Reese Miller; DF	(United States)	Houston, Texas	Houston Dynamo	3/5 stars
Amari Salley; FW	(United States)	Harrisburg, North Carolina	Atlanta United	3/5 stars
Parker Sloan; MF	(United States)	Cartersville, Virginia	FC Richmond	2/5 stars
Andrew Sullins; FW	(United States)	Athens, Tennessee	Atlanta United	3/5 stars
Owen Walz; DF	(United States)	Arlington, Virginia	DC United	4/5 stars

== Squad ==
=== Roster ===
As of January 25, 2023

Note: Flags indicate national team as defined under FIFA eligibility rules; some limited exceptions apply. Players may hold more than one non-FIFA nationality.

No.	Pos.	Nation	Player
1	GK	USA	Scott Williams
2	DF	USA	William Citron
3	MF	USA	Isaiah Byrd
4	DF	GER	Paul Wiese
5	DF	USA	Aidan O'Connor
6	MF	JAM	Jeremy Verly
7	FW	BRA	Leo Afonso
8	MF	USA	Erick Kilosho
9	FW	USA	Philip Horton
10	MF	USA	Asparuh Slavov
11	FW	NOR	Kevin Ogudugu
12	MF	SWE	Albin Gashi
13	DF	GER	Mortiz Kappelsberger
15	FW	USA	Triton Beauvois
16	MF	USA	Daniel Mangarov
17	DF	NOR	Andreas Ueland
18	FW	USA	Kome Ubogu
19	DF	USA	Reese Miller

No.	Pos.	Nation	Player
20	FW	ZIM	Cabrel Happi Kamseu
21	MF	GER	Nils Henry Orywol
22	FW	USA	Michael Tsicoulias
23	FW	USA	David Okorie
24	MF	NOR	Axel Ahlander
25	FW	USA	Andy Sullins
26	MF	USA	Amari Salley
27	DF	USA	Owen Walz
28	FW	USA	Henry Van Wincoop
29	DF	USA	Yassine Rhoumar
30	GK	USA	Colin Gallagher
31	MF	ITA	Umberto Pela
32	FW	USA	Parker Sloan
34	MF	USA	Miguel Kobby Adoboe
35	FW	USA	Truman Glenovatch
46	DF	USA	Matthew Hunter
99	GK	USA	Holden Brown

=== Team management ===
Position	Staff
Head coach	George Gelnovatch
Associate head coach	Matt Chulis
Assistant coach	Adam Perron
Volunteer assistant coach	Mike Lyons
Director of operations	Jermaine Birriel

== Schedule ==
Date Time, TV	Rank^{#}	Opponent^{#}	Result	Record	Site (Attendance) City, State
Exhibition
August 13*; 7:00 p.m.		Charlotte	L 2–3	–	Klöckner Stadium; Charlottesville, VA
August 20*; 5:00 p.m.		Bowling Green	W 5–1	–	Klöckner Stadium; Charlottesville, VA
Regular Season
August 25*; 7:00 p.m., ACCNX		Xavier	L 0–1	0–1–0	Klöckner Stadium (1,517); Charlottesville, VA
August 29*; 7:00 p.m., ACCNX		Rider	W 4–0	1–1–0	Klöckner Stadium (895); Charlottesville, VA
September 1*; 8:00 p.m., ACCNX		James Madison	W 3–0	2–1–0	Klöckner Stadium (1,774); Charlottesville, VA
September 5*; 6:00 p.m., YouTube		vs. No. 9 Maryland; Rivalry	L 1–6	2–2–0	Audi Field (2,022); Washington, D.C.
September 9; 8:00 p.m., ACCN		Virginia Tech; Rivalry	W 4–2	3–2–0 (1–0–0)	Klöckner Stadium (3,378); Charlottesville, VA
September 13*; 7:00 p.m., ACCNX		La Salle	W 5–0	4–2–0	Klöckner Stadium (855); Charlottesville, VA
September 16; 7:00 p.m., ACCNX		Notre Dame	L 1–2	4–3–0 (1–1–0)	Klöckner Stadium (2,255); Charlottesville, VA
September 20*; 7:00 p.m., ACCNX		American	W 2–0	5–3–0	Klöckner Stadium (1,024); Charlottesville, VA
September 24; 7:00 p.m., ACCNX		at No. 3 Syracuse	W 1–0	6–3–0 (2–1–0)	SU Soccer Stadium (2,311); Syracuse, NY
September 30; 7:00 p.m., ACCNX		at No. 10 Pittsburgh	W 3–1	7–3–0 (3–1–0)	Ambrose Urbanic Field (1,522); Pittsburgh, PA
October 4*; 6:00 p.m., ACCNX	No. 21	No. 10 Denver	L 0–1	7–4–0	Klöckner Stadium (985); Charlottesville, VA
October 7; 7:00 p.m., ACCNX	No. 21	No. 2 Duke	T 0–0	7–4–1 (3–1–1)	Klöckner Stadium (3,830); Charlottesville, VA
October 17; 5:30 p.m., ACCNX		at No. 2 Clemson	W 2–1	8–4–1 (4–1–1)	Riggs Field (2,236); Clemson, SC
October 18*; 7:00 p.m., ACCN	No. 24	Hofstra	T 1–1	8–4–2	Klöckner Stadium (1,965); Charlottesville, VA
October 22; 7:00 p.m., ACCNX	No. 24	No. 25 Wake Forest	W 1–0	9–4–2 (5–1–1)	Klöckner Stadium (2,416); Charlottesville, VA
October 28; 7:00 p.m., ACCNX	No. 18	at North Carolina	T 2–2	9–4–3 (5–1–2)	Dorrance Field (1,196); Chapel Hill, NC
ACC tournament
November 6; 4:00 p.m., ACCN	(3) No. 14	(6) No. 24 Pittsburgh; Quarterfinals	W 1–0	10–4–3	Klöckner Stadium (1,036); Charlottesville, VA
November 9; 5:00 p.m., ACCN	(3) No. 11	(2) No. 3 Syracuse; Semifinals	T 2–2 (3–5 PKs) ^{2OT}	10–4–4	SU Soccer Stadium (1,340); Syracuse, NY
NCAA tournament
November 20; 1:00 p.m., ESPN+	(4) No. 11	No. 9 Marshall; Second Round	T 1–1 (3–5 PKs)	10–4–5	Klöckner Stadium (870); Charlottesville, VA
*Non-conference game. ^{#}Rankings from United Soccer Coaches. (#) Tournament seedings in parentheses. All times are in Eastern.

== Awards and honors ==
Recipient	Award	Date	Ref.
Andreas Ueland	Pre-Season ACC Watchlist	August 16	
Andreas Ueland	ACC Defensive Player of the Week	September 27	
Holden Brown	ACC Co-defensive Player of the Week	October 4	
Leo Afonso	ACC Offensive Player of the Week	October 25	
Andreas Ueland	Defensive Player of the Year	November 9	
Leo Afonso	All-ACC First Team	November 9	
Andreas Ueland	All-ACC First Team	November 9	
Holden Brown	All-ACC Third Team	November 9	
Reese Miller	ACC All-Freshman Team	November 9	

== 2023 MLS Super draft ==
Player	Team	Round	Pick #	Position
Andreas Ueland	New England Revolution	3	68	DF

== Rankings ==
Ranking movements Legend: ██ Increase in ranking ██ Decrease in ranking — = Not ranked RV = Received votes
	Week																
Poll	Pre	1	2	3	4	5	6	7	8	9	10	11	12	13	14	15	Final
United Soccer	—	—	—	—	—	—	21	RV	24	18	14	11	Not released				16
TopDrawer Soccer	—	—	—	—	—	—	—	—	—	15	14	10	9	12	15	16	16
