= Amferny Sinclair =

Costa Rican footballer (born 2000)

Personal information
- Full name: Amferny Stward Arias Sinclair
- Date of birth: January 15, 2000 (age 26)
- Place of birth: Alajuela, Costa Rica
- Height: 1.80 m (5 ft 11 in)
- Position: Defensive midfielder

Team information
- Current team: Puntarenas F.C.
- Number: 55

Youth career
- 2008–2018: Alajuelense

College career
Years	Team	Apps	(Gls)
2019–2022	Syracuse Orange	64	(1)

Senior career*
Years	Team	Apps	(Gls)
2019	Reading United	6	(0)
2022	One Knoxville	5	(0)
2023	Real Monarchs	17	(1)

International career^{‡}
2017	Costa Rica U17	7	(0)
2018	Costa Rica U20	4	(0)
- * Club domestic league appearances and goals as of 16 December 2023 ‡ National team caps and goals as of 16 March 2023

Amferny Stward Arias Sinclair (born January 15, 2000) is a Costa Rican professional soccer player for Puntarenas F.C.. He played college soccer for Syracuse University.

== Playing career ==
Amferney Sinclair was born Ronald Arias Jimenez and Yorleny Sinclair Clark in Alajuela, Costa Rica. He attended Escuela Bri-Bri and was a standout at Liga Deportiva Alajuelense for 11 years.

He has appeared for his home country at various youth levels, most notably at the 2017 FIFA U-17 World Cup and the 2018 CONCACAF U-20 Championship.

=== College ===
Sinclair chose to pursue college soccer at Syracuse University in 2019. At Syracuse, Sinclair appeared in 64 matches during his four years, starting every match of his senior year. As a senior in 2022, Sinclair was named a team captain. He helped clinch Syracuse's first ever national championship with a successful penalty kick in the 7–6 shootout against Indiana. He started 21 matches and played 1,890 minutes.

=== Semi-pro clubs ===
Sinclair played for Reading United AC in 2019 and One Knoxville SC in 2022.

=== Real Salt Lake ===
On December 21, 2022, Sinclair was selected by the Real Salt Lake as the 45th overall pick in the 2023 MLS SuperDraft. He signed with Salt Lake's MLS Next Pro side Real Monarchs on 9 May 2023.

== Honors ==
Syracuse University

- Atlantic Division regular season: 2022
- ACC men's soccer tournament: 2022
- NCAA Division I men's soccer tournament: 2022
