= 2022 NCAA Division I men's soccer championship game =

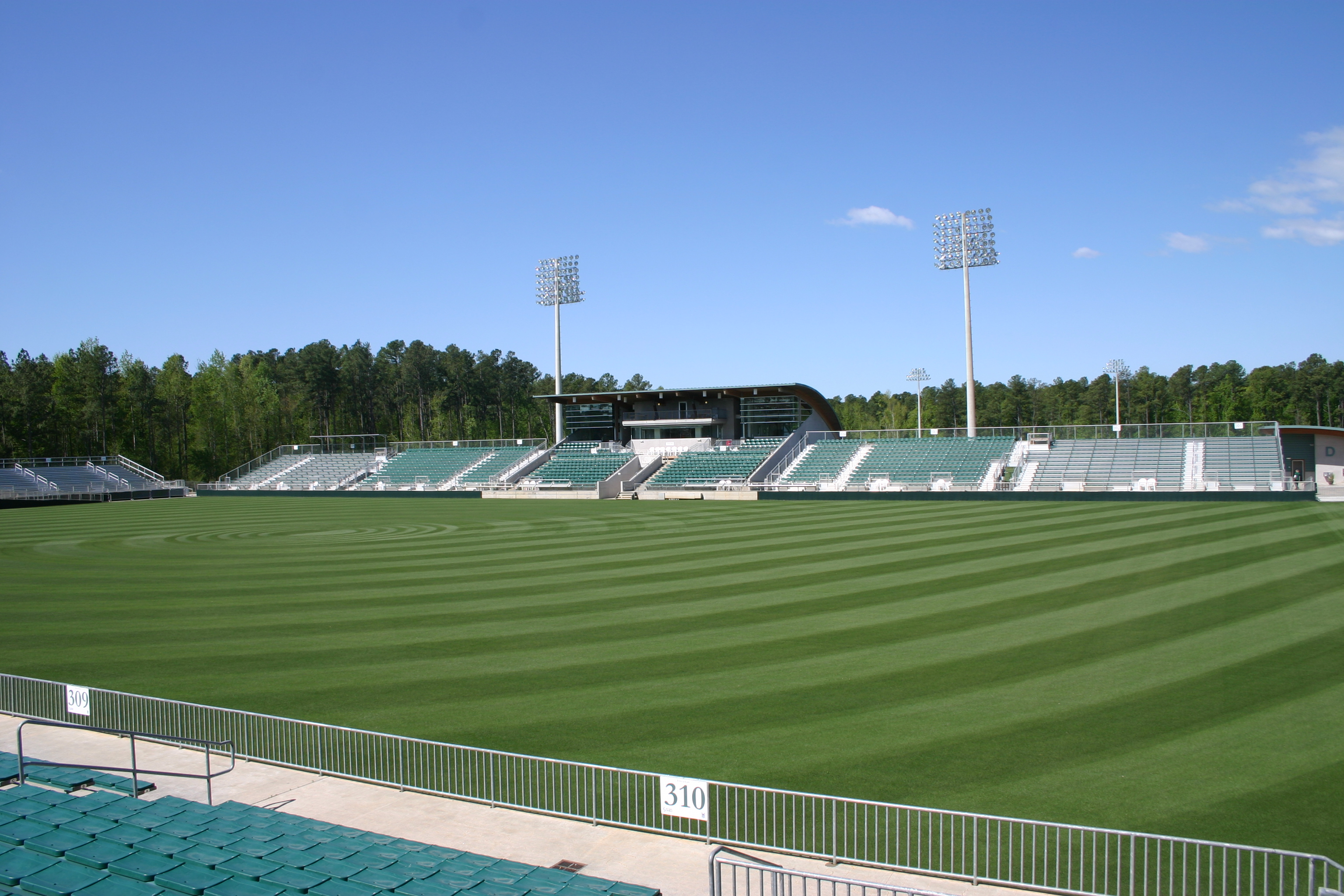
- WakeMed Soccer Park hosted the final
- Event: 2022 NCAA Division I men's soccer tournament
Syracuse	Indiana
ACC	Big Ten
2	2
- After extra time Syracuse won 7–6 on penalties
- Date: December 12, 2022
- Venue: WakeMed Soccer Park, Cary, North Carolina, U.S.
- Referee: Matt Thompson
- Attendance: 4,010

The 2022 NCAA Division I men's soccer championship game (also known as the 2022 NCAA Division I Men's College Cup) was played on December 12, 2022, at WakeMed Soccer Park in Cary, North Carolina and determined the winner of the 2022 NCAA Division I men's soccer tournament, the national collegiate soccer championship in the United States. This was the 64rd edition of the oldest active competition in United States college soccer.

The match featured Syracuse University, which made its first ever appearance in the College Cup final, and Indiana University Bloomington (known athletically as simply "Indiana"), which made its 16th appearance in the final, and its first since 2020.

The match was tied 2–2 at the end of regulation and after extra time. A penalty shootout was held to determine the College Cup winner, which Syracuse won 7–6. The title gave Syracuse their first NCAA title in men's soccer.

== Road to the final ==
The NCAA Division I men's soccer tournament, sometimes known as the College Cup, is an American intercollegiate soccer tournament conducted by the National Collegiate Athletic Association (NCAA), and determines the Division I men's national champion. The tournament has been formally held since 1959, when it was an eight-team tournament. Since then, the tournament has expanded to 48 teams, in which every Division I conference tournament champion is allocated a berth. It was Syracuse's first title game appearance in school history, and Indiana's 17th.

Indiana (B1G)		Round	Syracuse (ACC)	
Opponent	Result	NCAA Tournament	Opponent	Result
Bye	—	First round	Bye	—
Saint Louis (A-10)	1–0 (H)	Second round	Penn (Ivy)	2–1 (H)
Marshall (SBC)	1–0 (H)	Third round (Sweet 16)	Cornell (Ivy)	1–0 (H)
UNC Greensboro (SoCon)	2–0 (A)	Quarterfinals (Elite 8)	Vermont (A-East)	2–1 (H)
Pittsburgh (ACC)	2–0 (N)	College Cup (Final 4)	Creighton (Big East)	3–2 (N)

== Match details ==
College Cup
December 12, 2022
6:00 pm
Final

Syracuse	2–2 (a.e.t.)	Indiana
Opoku 24'; Calov 33'	Report	McDonald 32'; Endeley 80'
Penalties
Boselli (penalty scored); Kocevski (penalty missed); Calov (penalty scored); Singelmann (penalty scored); Biros (penalty scored); Rauch (penalty scored); Johnson (penalty scored); Sinclair (penalty scored)	7–6	(penalty scored) Wittenbrink; (penalty missed) Henderlong; (penalty scored) Mihalic; (penalty scored) Sarver; (penalty scored) Maher; (penalty scored) Bezerra; (penalty scored) Helmer; (penalty missed) Goumballe

WakeMed Soccer Park, Cary
Attendance: 4,010
Referee: Matt Thompson

Syracuse
Indiana

GK	1	(United States) Russell Shealy
DF	2	(Canada) Christian Curti
DF	3	(Somalia) Abdi Salim						(yellow card) 17'
DF	4	(Germany) Noah Singelmann	(substituted off) 35'	(substituted in) 45'	(substituted off) 94'
MF	5	(Costa Rica) Amferny Sinclair						(yellow card) 35'
MF	8	(United States) Jeorgio Kocevski
FW	10	(Ghana) Nathan Opoku	(substituted off) 36'	(substituted in) 45'
FW	11	(Italy) Lorenzo Boselli	(substituted off) 24'	(substituted in) 45'	(substituted off) 67'
FW	14	(Canada) Levonte Johnson	(substituted off) 32'	(substituted in) 45'	(substituted off) 67'	(substituted in) 83'
MF	17	(Germany) Giona Leibold	(substituted off) 36'	(substituted in) 45'	(substituted off) 83'	(substituted in) 90'
DF	22	(Canada) Olu Oyegunle
Substitutions:
MF	7	(United States) Curt Calov	(substituted in) 32'	(substituted off) 45'	(substituted in) 67'	(substituted off) 83'	(substituted in) 94'
FW	9	(Germany) Julius Rauch	(substituted in) 36'	(substituted off) 45'
MF	13	(United States) Colin Biros	(substituted in) 24'	(substituted off) 45'	(substituted in) 67'	(substituted off) 83'
MF	18	(United States) Camden Holbrook	(substituted in) 36'	(substituted off) 45'	(substituted in) 83'	(substituted off) 90'
DF	23	(United States) Jackson Glenn	(substituted in) 35'	(substituted off) 45'	(substituted in) 83'
Manager:
(England) Ian McIntyre

GK	0	(United States) JT Harms
DF	2	(United States) Joey Maher					(yellow card) 97'
DF	5	(United States) Daniel Munie
FW	9	(United States) Samuel Sarver
DF	11	(United States) Nyk Sessock
FW	14	(United States) Maouloune Goumballe	(substituted off) 24'	(substituted in) 45'	(substituted off) 62'	(substituted in) 105'
FW	17	(United States) Herbert Endeley
FW	18	(United States) Ryan Wittenbrink
DF	19	(United States) Brett Bebej	(substituted off) 105'
MF	21	(United States) Jack Wagoner					(yellow card) 90'
MF	22	(United States) Patrick McDonald
Substitutions:
FW	7	(United States) Karsen Henderlong
FW	10	(United States) Tommy Mihalic	(substituted in) 24'	(substituted off) 45'	(substituted in) 62'	(substituted off) 108'
MF	12	(Netherlands) Quinten Helmer
FW	15	(United States) Luka Bezerra
FW	26	(United States) Nate Ward	(substituted in) 108'
Manager:
(United States) Todd Yeagley

College Cup MVP
Offensive: Nathan Opoku (Syracuse)
Defensive: Russell Shealy (Syracuse)

Assistant referees:
Salma Perez (United States)
Albert Escovar (United States)
Fourth official:
Dimitar Chavdarov (United States)

Match rules:

- 90 minutes.
- 20 minutes of extra time if necessary.
- Penalty shoot-out if scores still level.
- Unlimited substitutes, may not return if subbed out in the first half; may return unlimited times in the second half.

=== Statistics ===
Overall
	Syracuse	Indiana
Goals scored	2	2
Total shots	20	15
Shots on target	8	5
Saves	3	6
Corner kicks	6	7
Offsides	2	5
Yellow cards	2	2
Red cards	0	0
