= Russell Shealy =

American footballer (born 1999)

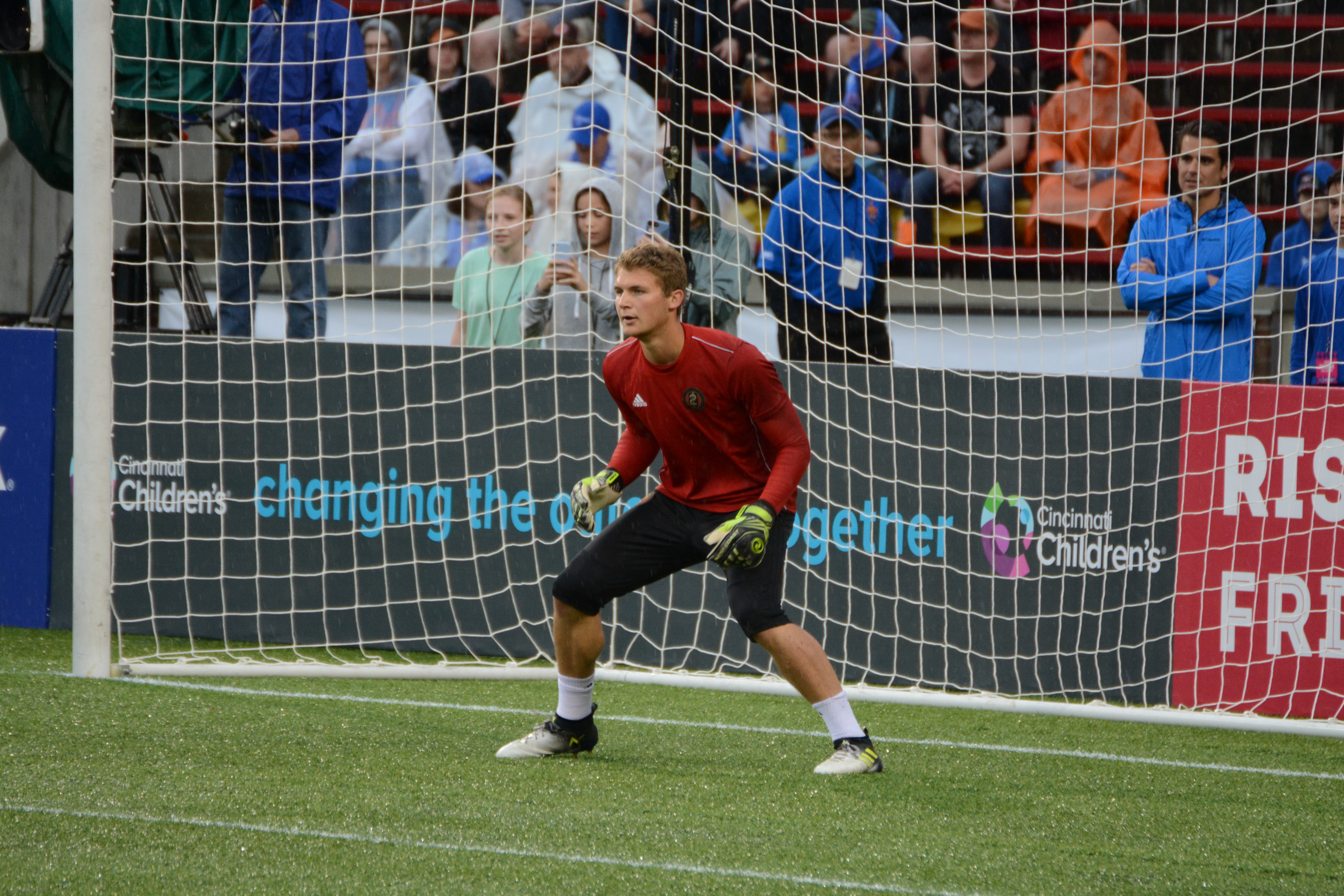

Personal information
- Date of birth: September 26, 1999 (age 27)
- Place of birth: Cartersville, Georgia, U.S.
- Height: 1.85 m (6 ft 1 in)
- Position: Goalkeeper

Youth career
- 2015: Concorde Fire
- 2016–2018: Atlanta United

College career
Years	Team	Apps	(Gls)
2018–2019	Maryland Terrapins	5	(0)
2020–2022	Syracuse Orange	43	(0)

Senior career*
Years	Team	Apps	(Gls)
2018	Atlanta United 2	0	(0)
2021	Georgia Revolution	2	(0)
2022	Reading United	8	(0)
2023	Crown Legacy FC	3	(0)
2024	Northern Colorado Hailstorm	1	(0)
2025	Union Omaha	1	(0)
- * Club domestic league appearances and goals as of November 21, 2024

Russell Shealy (born September 26, 1999) is an American professional soccer player.

== Playing career ==
Russell Shealy was born to Dr. Jim Shealy and Maureen Shealy in Cartersville, Georgia and attended Darlington School in Rome, Georgia.

During high school, he played for the Concorde Fire soccer club, Atlanta United Academy (Atlanta United 2), and US Youth Soccer.

After high school, Shealy was rated by Top Drawer Soccer as the No. 102 recruit in the country and he was recruited by Wofford College and the University of Maryland. In his junior year of high school, he committed to Wofford but soon decided to join Maryland squad instead.

=== College ===
During his freshman year in 2018, Shealy redshirted at Maryland, serving as the main backup behind Dayne St. Clair on Maryland's National Championship team. When St. Clair left early for MLS, Shealy was named the first-choice keeper at the start of the 2019 season, but lost the spot to German Niklas Neumann.

In 2020, Shealy transferred to Syracuse and made his first start for SU men's soccer after waiting for only three games. Michael Flynn was his position coach at Syracuse. He was a Communication and Rhetorical Studies major at Syracuse.

In 2022, he set program records for goalkeeper minutes in a season (2,220) and goalkeeper wins in a season (18–2–4). Shealy started 24 of the 25 matches on the way to the 2022 NCAA National Championship title and tallied 16 shutouts in 43 games, including posting 10 shutouts, career-highs in saves (72), goals against average (0.73), save percentage (0.800), and clean sheets (10).

At the end of the 2022 season, the team won the national championship and Shealy was named 2022 Men's College Cup's Defensive Most Outstanding Player.

Shealy saved three shots in the NCAA National Championship match against Indiana.

=== Semi-pro clubs ===
Shealy played for National Premier Soccer League side Georgia Revolution in 2021 and USL League Two side Reading United AC in 2022.

=== LA Galaxy ===
On December 21, 2022, Shealy was selected by the LA Galaxy as the 52nd overall pick in the 2023 MLS SuperDraft.

He is represented by ProConnect Soccer, soccer agency.

=== Northern Colorado Hailstorm ===
Shealy signed with USL League One club Northern Colorado Hailstorm on January 19, 2024.

== Honors ==
Syracuse University

- Atlantic Division regular season: 2022
- ACC men's soccer tournament: 2022
- NCAA Division I men's soccer tournament: 2022

Individual

- Men's College Cup Defensive Most Outstanding Player: 2022
- NCAA All-Tournament Team: 2022
- ACC All-Tournament Team & Most valuable player: 2022
- ACC All-Conference Second Team: 2022
- United Soccer Coaches' All-South Region Third Team
