= 2022 Louisville Cardinals men's soccer team =

American college soccer season

2022 Louisville Cardinals men's soccer

NCAA Tournament, First Round
- Conference: Atlantic Coast Conference
- Record: 9–6–3 (4–3–1 ACC)
- Head coach: John Michael Hayden (4th season)
- Assistant coaches: Bryan Green (4th season); Sean Teepen (1st season)
- Home stadium: Lynn Stadium

2022 ACC men's soccer standings
	Conf.					Overall
Team	W		L		T	W		L		T
Atlantic
No. 1 Syracuse ‡	5	–	1	–	2	18	–	2	–	5
No. 24 Wake Forest +	5	–	3	–	0	14	–	6	–	0
Louisville +	4	–	3	–	1	9	–	6	–	3
No. 13 Clemson +	3	–	4	–	1	13	–	7	–	1
Boston College	1	–	4	–	3	4	–	7	–	5
NC State	1	–	5	–	2	6	–	7	–	5
Coastal
No. 3 Duke +	5	–	0	–	3	13	–	2	–	4
No. 16 Virginia +	5	–	1	–	2	10	–	4	–	5
No. 8 Pittsburgh +	3	–	2	–	3	12	–	5	–	5
North Carolina +	2	–	2	–	4	8	–	6	–	5
Notre Dame	3	–	4	–	1	8	–	7	–	2
Virginia Tech	0	–	8	–	0	3	–	14	–	1
‡ – ACC Tournament champion + – Also invited to the 2022 NCAA tournament; As of December 13, 2022; Rankings from United Soccer Coaches; Source: The ACC

The 2022 Louisville Cardinals men's soccer team represented the University of Louisville during the 2022 NCAA Division I men's soccer season. The Cardinals were led by head coach John Michael Hayden, in his fourth season. They played their home games at Lynn Stadium. This was the team's 44th season playing organized men's college soccer and their 9th playing in the Atlantic Coast Conference.

The Cardinals finished the season 9–6–3 overall and 4–3–1 in ACC play to finish in third place in the Atlantic Division. As the fifth overall seed in the ACC Tournament they were upset by twelfth seed Virginia Tech in the First Round. They received an at-large bid to the NCAA Tournament where they lost in the First Round to Western Michigan to end their season.

== Background ==
The Cardinals finished the season 10–7–1 overall and 5–3–0 in ACC play to finish in second place in the Atlantic Division. As the fourth overall seed in the ACC Tournament the received a bye into the Quarterfinals, where they lost against fifth seed Notre Dame. They received an at-large bid to the NCAA Tournament where they lost in the First Round to Bowling Green to end their season.

== Player movement ==
=== Players leaving ===
Departures
Name	Number	Pos.	Height	Weight	Year	Hometown	Reason for Departure
Jack Fasteen	8	MF	5'11"	168	Junior	Louisville, Kentucky	Transferred to Liberty
Pedro Fonseca	10	FW	5'8"	154	Senior	Rio de Janeiro, Brazil	Graduated; Drafted 53rd overall in the 2022 MLS SuperDraft
Zeiko Harris	12	DF	6'4"	—	Senior	Sandys Parish, Bermuda	Graduated
Jack Hickey	18	DF	6'2"	175	(redshirt) Junior	Richmond, KY	Graduated
Jean Claude Bikorimana	25	MF	—	—	Freshman	Lexington, Kentucky	—
Detre Bell	30	GK	6'0"	—	Graduate Student	Hamilton, Bermuda	Graduated

=== Players arriving ===
==== Recruiting class ====
Name	Nat.	Hometown	Club	TDS Rating
David Boccuzzo; MF	USA	Orlando, Florida	Orlando City SC Academy	3/5 stars
Quinton Elliot; FW	USA	Charleston, West Virginia	Crew SC Academy	3/5 stars
Damien Barker John; FW	USA	Queens, New York	Met Oval	2/5 stars
Sammy Murphy; MF	USA	Prospect, Kentucky	Louisville City Academy	2/5 stars

== Squad ==
=== Roster ===
As of January 24, 2023

Note: Flags indicate national team as defined under FIFA eligibility rules; some limited exceptions apply. Players may hold more than one non-FIFA nationality.

No.	Pos.	Nation	Player
1	GK	USA	Gavin Krenecki
2	DF	USA	Dante Huckaby
3	DF	USA	Ryan Nichols
4	DF	USA	Bryce Lebel
5	DF	USA	Matty Walters
6	MF	MEX	Rafael Pinzón
7	FW	USA	Brandon McManus
8	MF	USA	David Boccuzzo
9	FW	USA	Aboubacar Camara
10	FW	NGA	Ugochukwu Achara
11	FW	SEN	Macoumba Ba
12	MF	NOR	Filip Fredhall
13	MF	USA	Bradley Sample
14	MF	GHA	Eric Danquah
15	MF	USA	RC Schmeider

No.	Pos.	Nation	Player
16	DF	USA	Josh Jones
17	FW	USA	Nico Diaz
18	DF	DEN	Marcus Jorgensen
19	MF	USA	Patrick Ajdukiewicz
20	DF	USA	Parker Forbes
21	MF	USA	Ayden Nocus
22	DF	USA	Axel Alejandre
23	MF	USA	Quinton Elliot
25	FW	USA	Damien Barker John
26	MF	USA	Sammy Murphy
27	FW	CYP	Konstantinos Georgallides
29	GK	USA	Alex Svetanoff
30	GK	USA	Ryan Troutman
31	GK	USA	Liam Fitzgerald
46	MF	NOR	Sander Roed

=== Team management ===
Position	Staff
Head coach	John Michael Hayden
Associate head coach	Bryan Green
Assistant Coach	Sean Teepen
Volunteer assistant coach	Darren Yeagle
Director of Operations	James Kusak

== Schedule ==
Date Time, TV	Rank^{#}	Opponent^{#}	Result	Record	Site (Attendance) City, State
Regular Season
August 25*; 5:00 p.m., ACCNX		No. 10 Saint Louis	W 3–1	1–0–0	Lynn Stadium (852); Louisville, KY
August 29*; 7:30 p.m., ACCNX		Bellarmine	W 3–0	2–0–0	Lynn Stadium (645); Louisville, KY
September 2*; 7:30 p.m., ACCNX		Seattle	W 2–1	3–0–0	Lynn Stadium (1,100); Louisville, KY
September 6*; 7:30 p.m., ESPN+	No. 10	at No. 5 Kentucky; Rivalry	L 2–3	3–1–0	Bell Soccer Complex (2,004); Lexington, KY
September 10; 7:30 p.m., ACCNX	No. 10	No. 7 Duke	L 1–2	3–2–0 (0–1–0)	Lynn Stadium (1,033); Louisville, KY
September 16; 7:00 p.m., ACCNX		at Boston College	T 1–1	3–2–1 (0–1–1)	Newton Campus Soccer Field (638); Chestnut Hill, MA
September 19*; 7:00 p.m., Facebook Live		at Florida Gulf Coast	W 1–0	4–2–1	FGCU Soccer Complex (487); Fort Myers, FL
September 23; 8:00 p.m., ACCN	No. 25т	No. 8 Pittsburgh	W 2–1	5–2–1 (1–1–1)	Lynn Stadium (508); Louisville, KY
September 27*; 7:30 p.m., ACCNX	No. 15	UNC Greensboro	T 1–1	5–2–2	Lynn Stadium (462); Louisville, KY
September 30; 7:00 p.m., ACCNX	No. 15	at NC State	W 1–0	6–2–2 (2–1–1)	Dail Soccer Field (62); Raleigh, NC
October 8; 7:00 p.m., ACCNX	No. 11	at Notre Dame	W 2–0	7–2–2 (3–1–1)	Alumni Stadium (419); Notre Dame, IN
October 11*; 7:00 p.m., ACCNX	No. 11	Evansville	W 2–0	8–2–2	Lynn Stadium (452); Louisville, KY
October 14; 7:00 p.m., ACCNX	No. 11	No. 5 Syracuse	L 1–2	8–3–2 (3–2–1)	Lynn Stadium (1,388); Louisville, KY
October 18*; 7:00 p.m., ACCNX	No. 11	East Tennessee State	T 1–1	8–3–3	Lynn Stadium (289); Louisville, KY
October 21; 7:00 p.m., ACCNX	No. 11	Clemson	W 1–0	9–3–3 (4–2–1)	Lynn Stadium (1,013); Louisville, KY
October 28; 8:00 p.m., ACCN	No. 9	at Wake Forest	L 0–3	9–4–3 (4–3–1)	Spry Stadium (2,011); Winston-Salem, NC
ACC Tournament
November 2; 6:00 p.m., ACCNX	(5) No. 11	(12) Virginia Tech; First Round	L 1–2	9–5–3	Lynn Stadium (515); Louisville, KY
NCAA Tournament
November 17; 7:00 p.m., ESPN+		Western Michigan; First Round	L 1–2	9–6–3	Lynn Stadium (307); Louisville, KY
*Non-conference game. ^{#}Rankings from United Soccer Coaches. (#) Tournament seedings in parentheses. All times are in Eastern.

== Awards and honors ==
Recipient	Award	Date	Ref.
Eric Danquah	Pre-Season ACC Watchlist	August 16	
Aboubakar Camara	ACC Offensive Player of the Week	September 27	
Josh Jones	ACC Co-defensive Player of the Week	October 25	
Sander Roed	All-ACC First Team	November 9	
Aboubakar Camara	All-ACC Second Team	November 9	

== Rankings ==
Ranking movements Legend: ██ Increase in ranking ██ Decrease in ranking — = Not ranked RV = Received votes т = Tied with team above or below
	Week																
Poll	Pre	1	2	3	4	5	6	7	8	9	10	11	12	13	14	15	Final
United Soccer	—	RV	10т	RV	25т	15	11	11	11	9	11	RV	Not released				—
TopDrawer Soccer	—	16	14	—	—	—	16	10	15	11	18	—	—	—	—	—	—
