= 2022 Atlantic Coast Conference men's soccer season =

- League: NCAA Division I
- Sport: Soccer
- Duration: August 25, 2022 – October 28, 2022
- Teams: 12

2023 MLS SuperDraft
- Top draft pick: Hamady Diop, 1st overall
- Picked by: Charlotte FC

Regular season
- Season champions: Atlantic:Syracuse; Coastal:Duke
- Runners-up: Atlantic:Wake Forest; Coastal:Virginia
- Season MVP: Offensive:Shak Mohammed; Midfielder:Peter Stroud; Defensive:Andreas Ueland
- Top scorer: Stefan Sigurdarson

ACC Tournament
- Champions: Syracuse
- Runners-up: Clemson
- Finals MVP: (United States) Russell Shealy

ACC men's soccer seasons
- ← 2021 2023 →

2022 ACC men's soccer standings
	Conf.					Overall
Team	W		L		T	W		L		T
Atlantic
No. 1 Syracuse ‡	5	–	1	–	2	18	–	2	–	5
No. 24 Wake Forest +	5	–	3	–	0	14	–	6	–	0
Louisville +	4	–	3	–	1	9	–	6	–	3
No. 13 Clemson +	3	–	4	–	1	13	–	7	–	1
Boston College	1	–	4	–	3	4	–	7	–	5
NC State	1	–	5	–	2	6	–	7	–	5
Coastal
No. 3 Duke +	5	–	0	–	3	13	–	2	–	4
No. 16 Virginia +	5	–	1	–	2	10	–	4	–	5
No. 8 Pittsburgh +	3	–	2	–	3	12	–	5	–	5
North Carolina +	2	–	2	–	4	8	–	6	–	5
Notre Dame	3	–	4	–	1	8	–	7	–	2
Virginia Tech	0	–	8	–	0	3	–	14	–	1
‡ – ACC Tournament champion + – Also invited to the 2022 NCAA tournament; As of December 13, 2022; Rankings from United Soccer Coaches; Source: The ACC

The 2022 Atlantic Coast Conference men's soccer season was the 69th season of men's varsity soccer in the conference.

Clemson were the defending champions of the Atlantic Conference and Pittsburgh were the defending champions of the Coastal Conference. Notre Dame were the defending ACC tournament Champion.

Eight ACC teams were invited to the 2021 NCAA tournament. Clemson had the best showing of the eight, winning their third title in program history.

Syracuse won the Atlantic Conference with a 5–1–2 record and Duke won the Costal Conference. Syracuse went on to win the ACC tournament 2–0 over eighth seed Clemson in the final.

In 2022, eight ACC teams were again invited to the NCAA tournament. Clemson was unable to defend its title, but another ACC team Syracuse, claimed the title with a penalty shoot-out victory over Indiana.

== Teams ==
=== Stadiums and locations ===
Atlantic Division
Team	Stadium	Capacity
Boston College	Newton Campus Soccer Field	1,800
Clemson	Riggs Field	6,500
Louisville	Lynn Stadium	5,300
NC State	Dail Soccer Field	3,000
Syracuse	SU Soccer Stadium	1,500
Wake Forest	Spry Stadium	3,000

Coastal Division
Team	Stadium	Capacity
Duke	Koskinen Stadium	7,000
North Carolina	Dorrance Field	4,200
Notre Dame	Alumni Stadium	2,500
Pittsburgh	Ambrose Urbanic Field	735
Virginia	Klöckner Stadium	7,100
Virginia Tech	Thompson Field	2,500

Note: Florida State, Georgia Tech and Miami (FL) are members of the Atlantic Coast Conference but do not sponsor men's soccer.

=== Personnel ===
Team	Head coach	Years at school	Overall record	Record at school	ACC record
Boston College	Bob Thompson	3	7–9–3	7–7–9	3–7–3
Clemson	Mike Noonan	13	353–184–48	140–71–35	53–36–15
Duke	John Kerr Jr.	15	206–153–44	125–94–31	49–53–17
Louisville	John Michael Hayden	4	25–23–4	25–23–4	13–13–2
North Carolina	Carlos Somoano	12	148–49–31	137–49–31	57–21–16
NC State	George Kiefer	6	199–130–63	37–36–16	10–24–11
Notre Dame	Chad Riley	5	43–29–9	43–29–9	15–17–4
Pittsburgh	Jay Vidovich	7	264–104–35	57–50–4	21–25–4
Syracuse	Ian McIntyre	13	210–147–64	103–83–35	20–40–17
Virginia	George Gelnovatch	27	351–148–62	351–148–62	95–71–33
Virginia Tech	Mike Brizendine	14	99–108–34	99–108–34	26–64–20
Wake Forest	Bobby Muuss	8	190–81–37	115–25–13	43–8–8

Notes

- Records shown are prior to the 2022 season
- Years at school includes the 2022 season
- ACC records include only years with current school.

== Preseason ==
=== Hermann Trophy ===
The ACC placed four players on the watch-list, which was announced on August 25.

Player	Class	Position	School
Til Zinnhardt	Senior	DF	North Carolina
Valentin Noël	Senior	MF	Pittsburgh
Peter Stroud	Junior	MF	Duke
Levonte Johnson	Senior	FW	Syracuse

=== Preseason Poll ===
The 2022 ACC Preseason Poll was released on August 16, 2022. The league's head coaches ranked Clemson as the preseason favorite, with 7 out of 12 votes. Full results of the poll are shown below:

Atlantic Division
Predicted finish	Team	Votes (1st place)
1	Clemson	64 (9)
2	Wake Forest	55 (3)
3	Louisville	47
4	Syracuse	33
5	Boston College	28
6	NC State	19

Coastal Division
Predicted finish	Team	Votes (1st place)
1	Pittsburgh	57 (6)
2	North Carolina	52 (5)
3	Notre Dame	44 (1)
4	Duke	38
5	Virginia Tech	34
6	Virginia	21

Media poll (ACC Championship)
Rank	Team	Votes
1	Clemson	6
2	North Carolina	2
2	Pittsburgh	2
3	Notre Dame	1
3	Wake Forest	1

=== Preseason awards ===
Preseason All-ACC Watchlist

Position	Player	Class	School
Goalkeeper	Brian Dowd	Junior	Notre Dame
Defender	Victor Souza	Senior	Boston College
Defender	Andreas Ueland	Senior	Virginia
Midfielder	Eric Danquah	Junior	Louisville
Midfielder	Mayola Kinyua	Senior	Virginia Tech
Midfielder	Omar Hernandez	Senior	Wake Forest
Midfielder	Sebastian Schacht	Graduate Student	North Carolina
Midfielder	Amferny Sinclair	Senior	Syracuse
Midfielder	Peter Stroud	Junior	Duke
Midfielder	Jackson Walti	Graduate Student	Pittsburgh
Forward	Luke Hille	Sophomore	NC State
Forward	Mohamed Seye	Senior	Clemson

== Regular season ==
Index to colors and formatting
ACC member won
ACC member lost
ACC member tied
ACC teams in **bold**

All times Eastern time.

=== Week 1 (Aug. 21 – Aug. 29) ===
Date	Time (ET)	Visiting team	Home team	Site	Result	Attendance
August 25	4:00 p.m.	Quinnipiac	**Boston College**	Newton Soccer Complex • Chestnut Hill, MA	**W** 5–2	450
August 25	5:00 p.m.	Iona	**Syracuse**	SU Soccer Stadium • Syracuse, NY	**W** 2–0	596
August 25	5:00 p.m.	No. 10 Saint Louis	**Louisville**	Lynn Stadium • Louisville, KY	**W** 3–1	852
August 25	7:00 p.m.	Seattle	**No. 4 Notre Dame**	Alumni Stadium • Notre Dame, IN	**L** 1–3	437
August 25	7:00 p.m.	Xavier	**Virginia**	Klöckner Stadium • Charlottesville, VA	**L** 0–1	1,517
August 25	7:30 p.m.	Air Force	**No. 24 North Carolina**	Dorrance Field • Chapel Hill, NC	**W** 2–1	2,327
August 25	8:00 p.m.	No. 2 Georgetown	**No. 7 Pittsburgh**	Ambrose Urbanic Field • Pittsburgh, PA	**W** 2–1	2,000
August 25	8:00 p.m.	UCF	**No. 15 Wake Forest**	Spry Stadium • Winston-Salem, NC	**W** 1–0	1,733
August 25	10:00 p.m.	**Virginia Tech**	Grand Canyon	GCU Stadium • Phoenix, AZ	**L** 0–1	2,515
August 26	7:00 p.m.	No. 13 Indiana	**No. 1 Clemson**	Riggs Field • Clemson, SC	**W** 3–2	6,539
August 26	7:00 p.m.	Loyola (MD)	**NC State**	Dail Soccer Field • Raleigh, NC	**W** 2–0	1,534
August 26	7:30 p.m.	San Diego	**No. 12** **Duke**	Koskinen Stadium • Durham, NC	**W** 1–0	587
August 28	2:30 p.m.	Milwaukee	**No. 12** **Duke**	Koskinen Stadium • Durham, NC	**W** 4–0	372
August 28	6:00 p.m.	No. 21 Penn State	**Syracuse**	SU Soccer Stadium • Syracuse, NY	**W** 1–0	1,556
August 28	7:00 p.m.	Air Force	**No. 15 Wake Forest**	Spry Stadium • Winston-Salem, NC	**W** 2–1	1,446
August 28	7:30 p.m.	South Florida	**No. 24 North Carolina**	Dorrance Field • Chapel Hill, NC	**W** 1–0	691
August 28	10:00 p.m.	**Virginia Tech**	No. 23 UCLA	Wallis Annenberg Stadium • Los Angeles, CA	**L** 0–1	515
August 29	5:30 p.m.	Northeastern	**Boston College**	Newton Soccer Complex • Chestnut Hill, MA	**W** 3–2	873
August 29	7:00 p.m.	Rider	**Virginia**	Klöckner Stadium • Charlottesville, VA	**W** 4–0	895
August 29	7:00 p.m.	USC Upstate	**No. 1 Clemson**	Riggs Field • Clemson, SC	**W** 2–0	3,053
August 29	7:00 p.m.	No. 6 West Virginia	**No. 7 Pittsburgh**	Ambrose Urbanic Field • Pittsburgh, PA	**W** 3–0	1,514
August 29	7:00 p.m.	Wofford	**NC State**	Dail Soccer Field • Raleigh, NC	**W** 4–0	882
August 29	7:30 p.m.	Bellarmine	**Louisville**	Lynn Stadium • Louisville, KY	**W** 3–0	645
August 29	7:30 p.m.	**No. 4** **Notre Dame**	Michigan State	DeMartin Soccer Complex • East Lansing, MI	**W** 3–2	1,684

Players of the Week

Offensive		Defensive	
Player	Team	Player	Team
Ousmane Sylla	Clemson	Christian Curti	Syracuse
Bertin Jacquesson	Pittsburgh	Christian Curti	Syracuse

=== Week 2 (Aug. 30 – Sep. 5) ===
Date	Time (ET)	Visiting team	Home team	Site	Result	Attendance
September 1	5:00 p.m.	Michigan	**No. 17 Duke**	Koskinen Stadium • Durham, NC	**W** 3–0	416
September 1	8:00 p.m.	James Madison	**Virginia**	Klöckner Stadium • Charlottesville, VA	**W** 3–0	1,774
September 2	4:00 p.m.	**NC State**	Mercer	Thompson Field • Blacksburg, VA	**T** 0–0	112
September 2	7:00 p.m.	**No. 1 Clemson**	South Carolina	Stone Stadium • Columbia, SC	**W** 1–0	5,449
September 2	7:00 p.m.	**No. 2 Pittsburgh**	No. 11 Marshall	Veterans Memorial Soccer Complex • Huntington, WV	**L** 1–2	1,879
September 2	7:00 p.m.	Radford	**Virginia Tech**	Thompson Field • Blacksburg, VA	**T** 0–0	317
September 2	7:00 p.m.	**No. 15 Syracuse**	Vermont	Virtue Field • Burlington, VT	**T** 1–1	741
September 2	7:30 p.m.	Seattle	**Louisville**	Lynn Stadium • Louisville, KY	**W** 2–1	1,100
September 3	1:00 p.m.	**Boston College**	UMass	Rudd Field • Amherst, MA	**L** 0–3	1,811
September 3	7:30 p.m.	FIU	**No. 13 North Carolina**	Dorrance Field • Chapel Hill, NC	**L** 1–2	774
September 3	8:00 p.m.	**No. 22 Notre Dame**	No. 21 Indiana	Bill Armstrong Stadium • Bloomington, IN	Postponed	
September 3	8:00 p.m.	**No. 5 Wake Forest**	UAB	PNC Field • Birmingham, AL	**W** 2–0	315
September 5	5:00 p.m.	Mercer	**Virginia Tech**	Thompson Field • Blacksburg, VA	**L** 2–3	175
September 5	6:00 p.m.	**Virginia**	No. 9 Maryland	Audi Field • Washington, D.C.	**L** 1–6	2,022
September 5	7:00 p.m.	Howard	**No. 2 Pittsburgh**	Ambrose Urbanic Field • Pittsburgh, PA	**W** 5–0	721
September 5	7:00 p.m.	**NC State**	Radford	Thompson Field • Blacksburg, VA	Postponed	
September 5	7:00 p.m.	**No. 15 Syracuse**	Connecticut	Morrone Stadium • Storrs, CT	**W** 5–0	2,052

Players of the Week

Offensive		Defensive	
Player	Team	Player	Team
Conor Kelly	NC State	Prince Amponsah	Wake Forest

=== Week 3 (Sep. 6 – Sep. 12) ===
Date	Time (ET)	Visiting team	Home team	Site	Result	Attendance
September 6	5:30 p.m.	Siena	**Boston College**	Newton Soccer Complex • Chestnut Hill, MA	**T** 1–1	137
September 6	6:00 p.m.	UNC Asheville	**No. 1 Clemson**	Riggs Field • Clemson, SC	**W** 4–0	1,504
September 6	7:00 p.m.	DePaul	**No. 22 Notre Dame**	Alumni Stadium • Notre Dame, IN	**T** 1–1	337
September 6	7:00 p.m.	**No. 10 Louisville**	No. 5 Kentucky	Bell Soccer Complex • Lexington, KY	**L** 2–3	2,004
September 6	7:00 p.m.	Winthrop	**No. 4 Wake Forest**	Spry Stadium • Winston-Salem, NC	**W** 5–1	1,020
September 9	7:00 p.m.	**No. 10 Pittsburgh**	**North Carolina**	Dorrance Field • Chapel Hill, NC	**PITT** 1–0	2,437
September 9	7:00 p.m.	**Virginia Tech**	**Virginia**	Klöckner Stadium • Charlottesville, VA	**UVA** 4–2	3,378
September 10	1:00 p.m.	**No. 22 Notre Dame**	**No. 24 Syracuse**	SU Soccer Stadium • Syracuse, NY	**CUSE** 1–0	1,872
September 10	7:00 p.m.	**No. 1 Clemson**	**Boston College**	Newton Soccer Complex • Chestnut Hill, MA	**CLEM** 2–1	1,208
September 10	7:00 p.m.	**NC State**	**No. 4 Wake Forest**	Spry Stadium • Winston-Salem, NC	**WAKE** 2–0	1,882
September 10	7:30 p.m.	**No. 7 Duke**	**No. 10 Louisville**	Lynn Stadium • Louisville, KY	**DUKE** 2–1	1,033

Players of the Week

Offensive		Defensive	
Player	Team	Player	Team
Shak Mohammed	Duke	Jackson Gilman	Pittsburgh
Roald Mitchell	Wake Forest	Garrison Tubbs	Wake Forest

=== Week 4 (Sep. 13 – Sep. 19) ===
Date	Time (ET)	Visiting team	Home team	Site	Result	Attendance
September 13	7:00 p.m.	ETSU	**North Carolina**	Dorrance Field • Chapel Hill, NC	**W** 1–0	594
September 13	7:00 p.m.	Fairleigh Dickinson	**No. 2т Wake Forest**	Spry Stadium • Winston-Salem, NC	**W** 3–2	1,457
September 13	7:00 p.m.	James Madison	**NC State**	Dail Soccer Field • Raleigh, NC	**L** 0–1	716
September 13	7:00 p.m.	La Salle	**Virginia**	Klöckner Stadium • Charlottesville, VA	**W** 5–0	855
September 13	7:00 p.m.	Niagara	**No. 16 Syracuse**	SU Soccer Stadium • Syracuse, NY	**W** 1–0	461
September 13	8:00 p.m.	**No. 1 Clemson**	UAB	PNC Field • Birmingham, AL	**W** 2–0	934
September 16	7:00 p.m.	**Louisville**	**Boston College**	Newton Soccer Complex • Chestnut Hill, MA	**T** 1–1	638
September 16	7:00 p.m.	**NC State**	**No. 10 Pittsburgh**	Ambrose Urbanic Field • Pittsburgh, PA	**PITT** 3–0	1,075
September 16	7:00 p.m.	**North Carolina**	**No. 5 Duke**	Koskinen Stadium • Durham, NC	**T** 1–1	3,155
September 16	7:00 p.m.	**Notre Dame**	**Virginia**	Klöckner Stadium • Charlottesville, VA	**ND** 2–1	2,255
September 16	7:30 p.m.	**No. 2т Wake Forest**	**Virginia Tech**	Thompson Field • Blacksburg, VA	**WAKE** 1–0	2,350
September 16	8:00 p.m.	**No. 16 Syracuse**	**No. 1 Clemson**	Riggs Field • Clemson, SC	**CUSE** 2–1	4,737
September 19	7:00 p.m.	Akron	**No. 10 Pittsburgh**	Ambrose Urbanic Field • Pittsburgh, PA	**T** 3–3	495
September 19	7:00 p.m.	**Louisville**	Florida Gulf Coast	FGCU Soccer Complex • Fort Myers, FL	**W** 1–0	487
September 19	7:00 p.m.	Presbyterian	**No. 1 Clemson**	Riggs Field • Clemson, SC	**W** 4–0	1,143

Players of the Week

Offensive		Defensive	
Player	Team	Player	Team
Levonte Johnson	Syracuse	Russell Shealy	Syracuse

=== Week 5 (Sep. 20 – Sep. 26) ===
Date	Time (ET)	Visiting team	Home team	Site	Result	Attendance
September 20	6:00 p.m.	**Boston College**	Boston University	Nickerson Field • Boston, MA	**T** 0–0	280
September 20	7:00 p.m.	American	**Virginia**	Klöckner Stadium • Charlottesville, VA	**W** 2–0	1,024
September 20	7:00 p.m.	**No. 7 Duke**	Elon	Rudd Field • Elon, NC	**W** 1–0	909
September 20	7:00 p.m.	George Mason	**No. 1 Wake Forest**	Spry Stadium • Winston-Salem, NC	**W** 6–1	1,794
September 20	7:00 p.m.	Longwood	**Virginia Tech**	Thompson Field • Blacksburg, VA	**W** 4–0	470
September 20	7:00 p.m.	**No. 3 Syracuse**	Colgate	Beyer-Small Field • Hamilton, NY	**W** 2–0	468
September 20	7:00 p.m.	UNC Wilmington	**North Carolina**	Dorrance Field • Chapel Hill, NC	**T** 0–0	1,475
September 21	7:00 p.m.	Chicago State	**Notre Dame**	Alumni Stadium • Notre Dame, IN	**W** 4–0	417
September 23	7:00 p.m.	**Virginia Tech**	**NC State**	Dail Soccer Field • Raleigh, NC	**NCST** 1–0	1,691
September 23	8:00 p.m.	**No. 8 Pittsburgh**	**No. 25т Louisville**	Lynn Stadium • Louisville, KY	**LOU** 2–1	508
September 24	7:00 p.m.	**Boston College**	**No. 7 Duke**	Koskinen Stadium • Durham, NC	**DUKE** 1–0	1,937
September 24	7:00 p.m.	**North Carolina**	**Notre Dame**	Alumni Stadium • Notre Dame, IN	**UNC** 1–0	818
September 24	7:00 p.m.	**Virginia**	**No. 3 Syracuse**	SU Soccer Stadium • Syracuse, NY	**UVA** 1–0	2,311
September 24	7:00 p.m.	**No. 1 Wake Forest**	**No. 10 Clemson**	Riggs Field • Clemson, SC	**WAKE** 6–1	3,744

Players of the Week

Offensive		Defensive	
Player	Team	Player	Team
Aboubakar Camara	Louisville	Andreas Ueland	Virginia

=== Week 6 (Sep. 27 – Oct. 3) ===
Date	Time (ET)	Visiting team	Home team	Site	Result	Attendance
September 27	7:00 p.m.	Kalamazoo	**Notre Dame**	Alumni Stadium • Notre Dame, IN	**W** 8–0	123
September 27	7:00 p.m.	**Virginia Tech**	Davidson	Alumni Soccer Stadium • Davidson, NC	**L** 1–3	689
September 27	7:00 p.m.	Yale	**No. 4 Duke**	Koskinen Stadium • Durham, NC	**T** 1–1	467
September 27	7:30 p.m.	UNCG	**No. 15 Louisville**	Lynn Stadium • Louisville, KY	**T** 1–1	462
September 30	6:00 p.m.	**Boston College**	**Notre Dame**	Alumni Stadium • Notre Dame, IN	**ND** 2–1	754
September 30	6:00 p.m.	**No. 7 Syracuse**	**Virginia Tech**	Thompson Field • Blacksburg, VA	**CUSE** 3–0	150
September 30	7:00 p.m.	**No. 15 Louisville**	**NC State**	Dail Soccer Field • Raleigh, NC	**LOU** 1–0	62
September 30	7:00 p.m.	**Virginia**	**No. 10 Pittsburgh**	Ambrose Urbanic Field • Pittsburgh, PA	**UVA** 3–1	1,522
October 1	7:00 p.m.	**No. 4 Duke**	**No. 1 Wake Forest**	Spry Stadium • Winston-Salem, NC	**DUKE** 3–2	3,630
October 3	7:00 p.m.	**No. 17 Clemson**	**North Carolina**	Dorrance Field • Chapel Hill, NC	**CLEM** 1–0	1,257

Players of the Week

Offensive		Defensive	
Player	Team	Player	Team
Philip Horton	Syracuse	Holden Brown	Virginia
Philip Horton	Syracuse	Russell Shealy	Syracuse

=== Week 7 (Oct. 4 – Oct. 10) ===
Date	Time (ET)	Visiting team	Home team	Site	Result	Attendance
October 4	6:00 p.m.	No. 10 Denver	**No. 21 Virginia**	Klöckner Stadium • Charlottesville, VA	**L** 0–1	985
October 4	7:00 p.m.	Cornell	**No. 7 Syracuse**	SU Soccer Stadium • Syracuse, NY	**L** 1–2	570
October 4	7:00 p.m.	High Point	**NC State**	Dail Soccer Field • Raleigh, NC	**W** 2–0	783
October 4	7:00 p.m.	Howard	**No. 2 Duke**	Koskinen Stadium • Durham, NC	**W** 2–0	579
October 4	7:00 p.m.	Jacksonville	**No. 4 Wake Forest**	Spry Stadium • Winston-Salem, NC	**W** 1–0	1,321
October 4	7:00 p.m.	**Virginia Tech**	ETSU	Summers-Taylor Stadium • Johnson City, TN	**W** 2–0	562
October 5	7:00 p.m.	**Notre Dame**	Indiana	Bill Armstrong Stadium • Bloomington, IN	**L** 0–1	2,311
October 7	7:00 p.m.	**No. 2 Duke**	**No. 21 Virginia**	Klöckner Stadium • Charlottesville, VA	**T** 0–0	3,830
October 7	7:00 p.m.	**NC State**	**Boston College**	Newton Soccer Complex • Chestnut Hill, MA	**BC** 2–0	543
October 7	7:00 p.m.	**Virginia Tech**	**North Carolina**	Dorrance Field • Chapel Hill, NC	**UNC** 2–0	1,588
October 7	7:00 p.m.	**No. 4 Wake Forest**	**No. 7 Syracuse**	SU Soccer Stadium • Syracuse, NY	**CUSE** 2–0	1,052
October 7	8:00 p.m.	**No. 23 Clemson**	**No. 25 Pittsburgh**	Ambrose Urbanic Field • Pittsburgh, PA	**T** 1–1	1,428
October 8	7:00 p.m.	**No. 11 Louisville**	**Notre Dame**	Alumni Stadium • Notre Dame, IN	**LOU** 2–0	419
October 10	6:00 p.m.	Loyola (MD)	**No. 7 Syracuse**	SU Soccer Stadium • Syracuse, NY	**W** 6–1	512
October 10	7:00 p.m.	No. 10 Denver	**No. 25 Pittsburgh**	Ambrose Urbanic Field • Pittsburgh, PA	**T** 2–2	606

Players of the Week

Offensive		Defensive	
Player	Team	Player	Team
Jeorgio Kocevski	Syracuse	Eliot Hamill	Duke

=== Week 8 (Oct. 11 – Oct. 17) ===
Date	Time (ET)	Visiting team	Home team	Site	Result	Attendance
October 11	7:00 p.m.	Brown	**Boston College**	Newton Soccer Complex • Chestnut Hill, MA	**L** 0–1	241
October 11	7:00 p.m.	Evansville	**No. 11 Louisville**	Lynn Stadium • Louisville, KY	**W** 2–0	452
October 11	7:00 p.m.	**NC State**	College of Charleston	Patriots Point Soccer Complex • Charleston, SC	**T** 0–0	353
October 11	7:00 p.m.	No. 23 UNCG	**No. 18 Clemson**	Riggs Field • Clemson, SC	**L** 1–2	1,571
October 11	7:00 p.m.	VCU	**North Carolina**	Dorrance Field • Chapel Hill, NC	**W** 1–0	690
October 11	7:00 p.m.	**No. 10 Wake Forest**	William & Mary	Albert–Daly Field • Williamsburg, VA	**L** 1–2	823
October 14	5:00 p.m.	**Pittsburgh**	**Virginia Tech**	Thompson Field • Blacksburg, VA	**PITT** 1–0	1,640
October 14	7:00 p.m.	**North Carolina**	**NC State**	Dail Soccer Field • Raleigh, NC	**T** 2–2	1,939
October 14	7:00 p.m.	**Notre Dame**	**No. 3 Duke**	Koskinen Stadium • Durham, NC	**DUKE** 2–0	1,643
October 14	7:00 p.m.	**No. 5 Syracuse**	**No. 11 Louisville**	Lynn Stadium • Louisville, KY	**CUSE** 2–1	1,388
October 15	5:30 p.m.	**Virginia**	**No. 18 Clemson**	Riggs Field • Clemson, SC	**UVA** 2–1	2,236
October 15	7:00 p.m.	**Boston College**	**No. 10 Wake Forest**	Spry Stadium • Winston-Salem, NC	**WAKE** 3–1	2,133
October 17	7:00 p.m.	Duquesne	**Pittsburgh**	Ambrose Urbanic Field • Pittsburgh, PA	**W** 5–2	939

Players of the Week

Offensive		Defensive	
Player	Team	Player	Team
Shak Mohammed	Duke	Buster Sjoberg	Syracuse

=== Week 9 (Oct. 18 – Oct. 24) ===
Date	Time (ET)	Visiting team	Home team	Site	Result	Attendance
October 18	6:00 p.m.	Princeton	**Virginia Tech**	Thompson Field • Blacksburg, VA	**L** 0–5	340
October 18	7:00 p.m.	Bucknell	**No. 4 Syracuse**	SU Soccer Stadium • Syracuse, NY	**W** 2–1	309
October 18	7:00 p.m.	ETSU	**No. 11 Louisville**	Lynn Stadium • Louisville, KY	**T** 1–1	289
October 18	7:00 p.m.	George Washington	**No. 2т Duke**	Koskinen Stadium • Durham, NC	**W** 4–0	404
October 18	7:00 p.m.	Hofstra	**No. 24 Virginia**	Klöckner Stadium • Charlottesville, VA	**T** 1–1	1,965
October 18	7:00 p.m.	**North Carolina**	Elon	Rudd Field • Elon, NC	**L** 0–3	874
October 18	7:00 p.m.	William & Mary	**NC State**	Dail Soccer Field • Raleigh, NC	**W** 2–1	338
October 18	7:00 p.m.	Wofford	**No. 25 Wake Forest**	Spry Stadium • Winston-Salem, NC	**W** 3–0	1,163
October 18	7:30 p.m.	UIC	**Notre Dame**	Alumni Stadium • Notre Dame, IN	**W** 4–2	588
October 21	6:00 p.m.	**North Carolina**	**Boston College**	Newton Soccer Complex • Chestnut Hill, MA	**T** 1–1	688
October 21	7:00 p.m.	**Clemson**	**No. 11 Louisville**	Lynn Stadium • Louisville, KY	**LOU** 1–0	1,013
October 21	7:00 p.m.	**Virginia Tech**	**Notre Dame**	Alumni Stadium • Notre Dame, IN	**UND** 1–0	1,279
October 21	8:00 p.m.	**Pittsburgh**	**No. 2т Duke**	Koskinen Stadium • Durham, NC	**T** 0–0	877
October 22	7:00 p.m.	**No. 4 Syracuse**	**NC State**	Dail Soccer Field • Raleigh, NC	**T** 1–1	895
October 22	7:00 p.m.	**No. 25 Wake Forest**	**No. 24 Virginia**	Klöckner Stadium • Charlottesville, VA	**UVA** 1–0	2,416
October 24	5:30 p.m.	Endicott	**Boston College**	Newton Soccer Complex • Chestnut Hill, MA	**W** 5–1	158
October 24	7:00 p.m.	UMass	**Clemson**	Riggs Field • Clemson, SC	**W** 3–1	1,624

Players of the Week

Offensive		Defensive	
Player	Team	Player	Team
Leo Afonso	Virginia	Josh Jones	Louisville
Leo Afonso	Virginia	Lucas Hatsios	NC State

=== Week 10 (Oct. 25 – Oct. 29) ===
Date	Time (ET)	Visiting team	Home team	Site	Result	Attendance
October 25	6:00 p.m.	William & Mary	North Carolina	Dorrance Field • Chapel Hill, NC	**W** 3–0	330
October 25	7:00 p.m.	Michigan	Notre Dame	Alumni Stadium • Notre Dame, IN	**W** 3–2	359
October 25	7:00 p.m.	Radford	NC State	Dail Soccer Field • Raleigh, NC	**W** 2–0	247
October 28	6:00 p.m.	**No. 3 Duke**	Virginia Tech	Thompson Field • Blacksburg, VA	**DUKE** 1–0	1,360
October 28	7:00 p.m.	**Boston College**	No. 4 Syracuse	SU Soccer Stadium • Syracuse, NY	**T** 1–1	1,201
October 28	7:00 p.m.	**NC State**	Clemson	Riggs Field • Clemson, SC	**CLEM** 3–0	1,984
October 28	7:00 p.m.	**Notre Dame**	No. 23 Pittsburgh	Ambrose Urbanic Field • Pittsburgh, PA	**T** 1–1	903
October 28	7:00 p.m.	**No. 18 Virginia**	North Carolina	Dorrance Field • Chapel Hill, NC	**T** 2–2	1,196
October 28	8:00 p.m.	**No. 9 Louisville**	Wake Forest	Spry Stadium • Winston-Salem, NC	**WAKE** 3–0	2,011

Players of the Week

Offensive		Defensive	
Player	Team	Player	Team
Daniel Russo	Notre Dame	Takuma Suzuki	Wake Forest

== Rankings ==
=== United Soccer Coaches ===
Legend
Increase in ranking
Decrease in ranking
Not ranked previous week

	Pre	Wk 1	Wk 2	Wk 3	Wk 4	Wk 5	Wk 6	Wk 7	Wk 8	Wk 9	Wk 10	Wk 11	Final
Boston College													
Clemson	1 (8)	1 (7)	1 (6)	1 (7)	10	17	23	18	RV			18т	13
Duke	12	17	7	5	7	4	2 (2)	3 (1)	2т (1)	3 (1)	3	4	3
Louisville		RV	10т	RV	25т	15	11	11	11	9	11	RV	
North Carolina	24	13	RV	RV	RV	RV							
NC State													
Notre Dame	4	22	22										
Pittsburgh	7	2 (1)	10т	10	8	10	25	RV	RV	23	24	RV	8
Syracuse		15	24	16	3	7	7	5	4	4	4	3	1 (6)
Virginia							21	RV	24	18	14	11	16
Virginia Tech	RV												
Wake Forest	15	5	4	2т	1 (7)	1 (8)	4	10	25	RV	RV	20т	24

=== Top Drawer Soccer ===
Legend
Increase in ranking
Decrease in ranking
Not ranked previous week

	Wk 1	Wk 2	Wk 3	Wk 4	Wk 5	Wk 6	Wk 7	Wk 8	Wk 9	Wk 10	Wk 11	Wk 12	Wk 13	Wk 14	Wk 15	Wk 16	Final
Boston College																	
Clemson	1	1	1	1	7	11	11	12	22			14	12	16	18	19	20
Duke	11	6	3	2	4	3	2	2	2	2	2	4	5	4	3	3	8
Louisville		16	14				16	10	15	11	18						
North Carolina		23															
NC State																	
Notre Dame	3	8	8	12	17												
Pittsburgh	9	5	5	5	3	10	14	15	14	13	15	16		22	22	10	4
Syracuse				13	8	7	6	7	3	3	4	3	1	1	1	1	1
Virginia										15	14	10	9	12	15	16	16
Virginia Tech																	
Wake Forest	19	7	4	3	1	1	4	8	17	19	17	13					

== Postseason ==
=== ACC Tournament ===
Semifinals
8	Clemson	2
4	Wake Forest	0
3	Virginia	2 (3)
2	Syracuse (pen.)	2 (5)

Final
8	Clemson	0
2	Syracuse	2

=== NCAA tournament ===
The ACC had eight teams receive a bid to the 2022 NCAA tournament, which was the highest number of bids for any conference. Four teams claimed top eight seeds, which was also the most among any conference.

Seed	School	First round	2nd Round	3rd Round	Quarterfinals	Semifinals	Championship
3	Syracuse	BYE	W 2–1 vs. No. 23 Penn – (Syracuse, NY)	W 1–0 vs. No. 16 Cornell – (Syracuse, NY)	W 2–1 vs. No. 8 Vermont – (Syracuse, NY)	W 3–2 vs. Creighton – (Cary, NC)	T 2–2 (7–6 PKs) vs. Indiana – (Cary, NC)
4	Virginia	BYE	T 1–1 (3–5 PKs) vs. No. 9 Marshall – (Charlottesville, VA)				
6	Clemson	BYE	L 1–2 vs. UCLA – (Clemson, SC)				
7	Duke	BYE	W 3–1 vs. No. 9 Denver – (Durham, NC)	W 1–0 vs. No. 25 FIU – (Durham, NC)	L 2–3 vs. Creighton – (Durham, NC)		
	Louisville	L 1–2 (2OT) vs. Western Michigan – (Louisville, KY)					
	North Carolina	L 0–2 vs. High Point – (Chapel Hill, NC)					
	Pittsburgh	W 2–1 vs. Cleveland State – (Pittsburgh)	W 3–0 at No. 15 Akron – (Akron, OH)	W 2–1 at No. 2 Kentucky – (Lexington, KY)	W 1–0 (2OT) vs. No. 18 Portland – (Pittsburgh)	L 0–2 vs. Indiana – (Cary, NC)	
	Wake Forest	L 0–3 vs. No. 16 Ohio State – (Winston-Salem, NC)					
	W–L (%):	1–3–0 (.250)	3–1–1 (.700)	3–0–0 (1.000)	2–1–0 (.667)	1–1–0 (.500)	0–0–1 (.500) Total: 10–6–2 (.611)

=== Awards ===
==== All-ACC awards and teams ====
2022 ACC Men's Soccer Individual Awards
Award	Recipient(s)
Coach of the Year	Ian McIntyre – Syracuse
Offensive Player of the Year	Shak Mohammed – Duke
Midfielder of the Year	Peter Stroud – Duke
Defensive Player of the Year	Andreas Ueland – Virginia
Goalkeeper of the Year	Eliot Hamill – Duke
Freshman of the Year	Kamran Acito – Duke

2022 ACC Men's Soccer All-Conference Teams
First Team	Second Team	Third Team	All-Freshman Team
Ousmane Sylla – Clemson; Eliot Hamill – Duke; Shak Mohammed – Duke; Peter Stroud – Duke; Sander Roed – Louisville; Valentin Noël – Pittsburgh; Filip Mirkovic – Pittsburgh; Levonte Johnson – Syracuse; Nathan Opoku – Syracuse; Leo Afonso – Virginia; Andreas Ueland – Virginia	Stefan Sigurdarson – Boston College; Hamady Diop – Clemson; Amir Daley – Duke; Nick Pariano – Duke; Aboubacar Camara – Louisville; Milo Garvanian – North Carolina; Bertin Jacquesson – Pittsburgh; Jackson Walti – Pittsburgh; Russell Shealy – Syracuse; Garrison Tubbs – Wake Forest; Roald Mitchell – Wake Forest	Victor Souza – Boston College; Mohamed Seye – Clemson; Antino Lopez – Duke; Conor Kelly – NC State; Daniel Russo – Notre Dame; Christian Curti – Syracuse; Jeorgio Kocevski – Syracuse; Holden Brown – Virginia; Jahlane Forbes – Wake Forest; Babacar Niang – Wake Forest; Prince Amponsah – Wake Forest	Joseph Andema – Clemson; Kamran Acito – Duke; Axel Gudbjornsson – Duke; Kenan Hot – Duke; Sam Williams – North Carolina; KK Baffour – Notre Dame; Jackson Gilman – Pittsburgh; Reese Miller – Virginia; Misei Yoshizawa – Virginia Tech; Cooper Flax – Wake Forest; Vlad Walent – Wake Forest

== MLS SuperDraft ==
The ACC had sixteen players selected in the 2023 draft, the most by any conference. The ACC had the top two selections and seven overall first round picks. National Champions Syracuse lead the league with five overall picks. Clemson had the first overall pick for the second time in four drafts. No other school has had two top-five picks in the past four seasons.

=== Total picks by school ===
Team	Round 1	Round 2	Round 3	Total
Boston College	–	1	1	2
Clemson	2	1	–	3
Duke	1	–	–	1
Louisville	–	–	–	–
NC State	–	–	–	–
North Carolina	–	1	–	1
Notre Dame	–	–	–	–
Pittsburgh	2	1	–	3
Syracuse	2	2	1	5
Virginia	–	–	1	1
Virginia Tech	–	–	–	–
Wake Forest	–	–	–	–
Total	7	6	3	16

=== List of selections ===
Round	Pick #	MLS team	Player	Position	College
1	1	Charlotte FC	(Senegal) Hamady Diop	DF	Clemson
1	2	Orlando City	(Ghana) Shak Mohammed	FW	Duke
1	11	Nashville SC	(United States) Joey Skinner	DF	Clemson
1	16	Real Salt Lake	(France) Bertin Jacquesson	FW	Pittsburgh
1	17	Orlando City	(United States) Abdi Salim	DF	Syracuse
1	20	Austin FC	(France) Valentin Noël	MF	Pittsburgh
1	29	Vancouver Whitecaps	(Canada) Levonte Johnson	FW	Syracuse
2	34	Houston Dynamo	(United States) Isaiah Reid	FW	Clemson
2	39	New England Revolution	(United States) Victor Souza	DF	Boston College
2	45	Real Salt Lake	(Costa Rica) Amferny Sinclair	MF	Syracuse
2	52	LA Galaxy	(United States) Russell Shealy	GK	Syracuse
2	54	CF Montréal	(United States) Milo Garvanian	DF	North Carolina
2	56	Austin FC	(Switzerland) Jackson Walti	MF	Pittsburgh
3	68	New England Revolution	(Norway) Andreas Ueland	DF	Virginia
3	71	Vancouver Whitecaps	(Sweden) Buster Sjöberg	DF	Syracuse
3	79	New York Red Bulls	(United States) Amos Shapiro-Thompson	MF	Boston College

== Homegrown players ==
The Homegrown Player Rule is a Major League Soccer program that allows MLS teams to sign local players from their own development academies directly to MLS first team rosters. Before the creation of the rule in 2008, every player entering Major League Soccer had to be assigned through one of the existing MLS player allocation processes, such as the MLS SuperDraft.

To place a player on its homegrown player list, making him eligible to sign as a homegrown player, players must have resided in that club's home territory and participated in the club's youth development system for at least one year. Players can play college soccer and still be eligible to sign a homegrown contract.

Original MLS team	Player	Pos.	School	Ref.
New York Red Bulls	Peter Stroud	MF	Duke	
Nashville SC	Ben Martino	GK	Virginia Tech	
