= Nicholas Rabiu =

Ecuadorian footballer (born 2004)

Personal information
- Full name: Nicholas Rabiu
- Date of birth: 17 February 2004 (age 22)
- Positions: Winger; forward

Team information
- Current team: Wake Forest Demon Deacons
- Number: 6

Youth career
- –2019: New York SC
- 2019–2021: New York Red Bulls

College career
Years	Team	Apps	(Gls)
2022–	Wake Forest Demon Deacons	44	(3)

Senior career*
Years	Team	Apps	(Gls)
2021	New York Red Bulls II	8	(0)

International career
2021	Ecuador U17	0	(0)
- * Club domestic league appearances and goals as of 4 November 2021

Nicholas Rabiu (born 17 February 2004) is an Ecuadorian football player who plays as a winger for Wake Forest Demon Deacons.

== Career ==
Rabiu has played with the New York Red Bulls academy since 2019, after joining from New York SC.

In 2021, Rabiu appeared for New York Red Bulls II in the USL Championship, making his first appearance on 23 July, as an 88th-minute substitute during a 3–1 loss to Pittsburgh Riverhounds.

== International career ==
On 26 July 2021, Rabiu was called up to the Ecuador under-17 national team squad.
