= 2022 ACC men's soccer tournament =

Soccer tournament

- Classification: Division I
- Teams: 12
- Matches: 11
- Attendance: 13,074
- Site: Campus Sites; WakeMed Soccer Park; Cary, North Carolina
- Champions: Syracuse (2nd title)
- Winning coach: Ian McIntyre (2nd title)
- MVP: Russell Shealy (Syracuse)
- Broadcast: ESPNU (Final), ACC Network

2022 ACC men's soccer standings
	Conf.					Overall
Team	W		L		T	W		L		T
Atlantic
No. 1 Syracuse ‡	5	–	1	–	2	18	–	2	–	5
No. 24 Wake Forest +	5	–	3	–	0	14	–	6	–	0
Louisville +	4	–	3	–	1	9	–	6	–	3
No. 13 Clemson +	3	–	4	–	1	13	–	7	–	1
Boston College	1	–	4	–	3	4	–	7	–	5
NC State	1	–	5	–	2	6	–	7	–	5
Coastal
No. 3 Duke +	5	–	0	–	3	13	–	2	–	4
No. 16 Virginia +	5	–	1	–	2	10	–	4	–	5
No. 8 Pittsburgh +	3	–	2	–	3	12	–	5	–	5
North Carolina +	2	–	2	–	4	8	–	6	–	5
Notre Dame	3	–	4	–	1	8	–	7	–	2
Virginia Tech	0	–	8	–	0	3	–	14	–	1
‡ – ACC Tournament champion + – Also invited to the 2022 NCAA tournament; As of December 13, 2022; Rankings from United Soccer Coaches; Source: The ACC

The 2022 ACC men's soccer tournament was the 36th edition of the ACC Men's Soccer Tournament. The tournament decided the Atlantic Coast Conference champion and guaranteed representative into the 2022 NCAA Division I men's soccer tournament. The final was played at WakeMed Soccer Park in Cary, North Carolina.

The defending champions, Notre Dame was unable to defend their title, falling to Clemson in the first round. Clemson advanced to the final, becoming the lowest seed to do so in tournament history. However, Clemson could not complete their improbable run, losing to Syracuse 2–0 in the final. The victory was the second ACC Tournament title during Syracuse's time in the ACC and second title under head coach Ian McIntyre.

== Qualification ==
All twelve teams in the Atlantic Coast Conference earned a berth into the ACC Tournament. The winners of each division, Atlantic and Coastal, were seeds 1 and 2. The top 4 seeds received first round byes and hosted the winner of a first round game. The remaining 10 teams in the conference were seeded according to points awarded in conference matches. All rounds, with the exception of the final were held at the higher seed's home field. Seeding was determined by regular season conference record. The seeding for the tournament was determined on the final day of conference play, October 28.

(*: division winners are automatically given the top two seeds).

Seed	School	Conference Record	Points
1	Duke	5–0–3	18
2	Syracuse	5–1–2	17
3	Virginia	5–1–2	17
4	Wake Forest	5–3–0	15
5	Louisville	4–3–1	13
6	Pittsburgh	3–2–3	12
7	North Carolina	2–2–4	10
8	Clemson	3–4–1	10
9	Notre Dame	3–4–1	10
10	Boston College	1–4–3	6
11	NC State	1–5–2	5
12	Virginia Tech	0–8–0	0

== Bracket ==
*Note: Home team listed first. Rankings shown are ACC Tournament Seeds.

First Round; November 2 ACCN & ACCNX
8	Clemson	3
9	Notre Dame	1
5	Louisville	1
12	Virginia Tech	2
6	Pittsburgh (a.e.t.)	4
11	NC State	1
7	North Carolina	1
10	Boston College	0

Quarterfinals; November 6 ACCN
1	Duke	0
8	Clemson	2
4	Wake Forest	1
12	Virginia Tech	0
3	Virginia	1
6	Pittsburgh	0
2	Syracuse	1
7	North Carolina	0

Semifinals; November 9 ACCN
8	Clemson	2
4	Wake Forest	0
3	Virginia	2 (3)
2	Syracuse (pen.)	2 (5)

Final; November 13; ESPNU
8	Clemson	0
2	Syracuse	2

== Matches ==
=== First round ===
November 2, 2022	#5 Louisville	1–2	#12 Virginia Tech	Louisville, KY
6:00 p.m.	Bradley Sample 37'; David Boccuzzo (yellow card) 61'; Konstantinos Georgallides (yellow card) 79'; Brandon McManus (yellow card) 87'	Report	30' Ethan Ballek; 55' Daniel Starr; (yellow card) 70' Nick Blacklock; (yellow card) 88' Chris Nicola	Stadium: Lynn Stadium; Attendance: 515; Referee: John McCloskey; Assistant referees: Dean Morgan; Jeremy Sharp; Fourth official: Aaron Rawlins

November 2, 2022	#7 North Carolina	1–0	#10 Boston College	Chapel Hill, NC
6:00 p.m.	Milo Garvanian (yellow card) 30'; Ernest Bawa 82'	Report	(yellow card) 60' Victor Souza	Stadium: Dorrance Field; Attendance: 445; Referee: Kevin Marrison; Assistant referees: Jude Carr; Kevin Maurer; Fourth official: David McPhun

November 2, 2022	#6 Pittsburgh	4–1 (a.e.t.)	#11 NC State	Pittsburgh, PA
7:00 p.m.	Michael Sullivan 12', 92'; Valentin Noël 106'; Jackson Walti 110'	Report	(yellow card) 10' Calem Tommy; (yellow card) 19', (goal) 26' Luke Hille; (yellow card) 75' Vusumzi Plamana; (yellow card) 90' Team; (yellow card) 99' Junior Nare	Stadium: Ambrose Urbanic Field; Attendance: 438; Referee: David Erbacher; Assistant referees: Ankur Singh; Ross Kleinstuber; Fourth official: Chris Regan

November 2, 2022	#8 Clemson	3–1	#9 Notre Dame	Clemson, SC
8:00 p.m.	Notre Dame Own Goal 11' (o.g.); Hamady Diop (yellow card) 23'; Isaiah Reid (yellow card) 31'; Notre Dame Own Goal 40' (o.g.); Enrique Montana III (yellow card) 47'; Ousmane Sylla (yellow card) 52'; Mohamed Seye 59'	Report	(yellow card) 32' (yellow-red card) 54' Bryce Boneau; (yellow card) 54' Josh Ramsey; (yellow card) 54' Reese Mayer; (yellow card) 70' Sebastian Green; (yellow card) 77' Paddy Burns; 81' Matthew Radivojsa; (yellow card) 90' KK Baffour	Stadium: Riggs Field; Attendance: 1,720; Referee: Jonathan Bilinski; Assistant referees: Rick Rogers; Chris Zuerner; Fourth official: Logan Webber

=== Quarterfinals ===
November 6, 2022	#4 Wake Forest	1–0	#12 Virginia Tech	Winston-Salem, NC
2:00 p.m. EST	Omar Hernandez 62'; Babacar Niang (yellow card) 75'; Team (yellow card) 85'	Report	(yellow card) 19' Jack Dearie; (yellow card) 62' Welnilton Da Silva; (yellow card) 69' Conor Pugh	Stadium: Spry Stadium; Attendance: 1,774; Referee: JC Griggs; Assistant referees: Raymond Thomas; Michael Donovan; Fourth official: Mark Buda

November 6, 2022	#3 Virginia	1–0	#6 Pittsburgh	Charlottesville, VA
4:00 p.m. EST	Reese Miller 21'; Paul Wiese (yellow card) 64'; Jeremy Verley (yellow card) 70'	Report		Stadium: Klöckner Stadium; Attendance: 1,036; Referee: Joshua Encarnacion; Assistant referees: William Aten; Kevin Uitto; Fourth official: Joe Wehrle

November 6, 2022	#2 Syracuse	1–0	#7 North Carolina	Syracuse, NY
6:00 p.m. EST	Christian Curti (yellow card) 69'; Levonte Johnson 86'	Report		Stadium: SU Soccer Stadium; Referee: Nikola Aleksic; Assistant referees: Ankur Singh; Democratis Pashalidis; Fourth official: Christopher Borncamp

November 6, 2022	#1 Duke	0–2	#8 Clemson	Durham, NC
8:00 p.m. EST	Peter Stroud (yellow card) 27'	Report	(yellow card) 10', (goal) 90' Brandon Parrish; (yellow card) 28' Adam Lundegard; (yellow card) 40', (goal) 71' Derek Waleffe; (yellow card) 90' Ousmane Sylla	Stadium: Koskinen Stadium; Attendance: 1,164; Referee: Kevin Morrison; Assistant referees: Benjamin Wooten; Justin Howard; Fourth official: Carmen Anthony Serbio

=== Semifinals ===
November 9, 2022	#2 Syracuse	2–2 (a.e.t.) (5–3 p)	#3 Virginia	Syracuse, NY
5:00 p.m. EST	Amferny Sinclair (yellow card) 16'; Jeorgio Kocevski 27' (pen.); Olu Oyegunle (yellow card) 70'; Giona Leibold (yellow card) 76'; Lorenzo Boselli 84'	Report	(yellow card) 27' Paul Wiese; 38' Andreas Ueland; (yellow card) 62' Team; (yellow card) 64' Daniel Mangarov; 66' Leo Afonso; (yellow card) 92' Moritz Kappelsberger	Stadium: SU Soccer Stadium; Attendance: 1,340; Referee: John McCloskey; Assistant referees: Jim Myers; Connor McCloskey; Fourth official: Jeffery Trubia
	Penalties
	Lorenzo Boselli (penalty scored); Jeorgio Kocevski (penalty scored); Nathan Opoku (penalty scored); Curt Calov (penalty scored); Colin Biros (penalty scored)		(penalty scored) Daniel Mangarov; (penalty missed) Andreas Ueland; (penalty scored) Philip Horton; (penalty scored) Axel Ahlander

November 9, 2022	#4 Wake Forest	0–2	#8 Clemson	Winston-Salem, NC
7:00 p.m. EST	Ryan Fessler (yellow card) 11'; Prince Amponsah (yellow card) 17'; David Wrona (yellow card) 41'	Report	(yellow card) 3' Elton Chifamba; 14' Brandon Parrish; (yellow card) 17' Adam Lundegard; 60' Derek Waleffe	Stadium: Spry Stadium; Attendance: 1,729; Referee: Carmen Serbio; Assistant referees: Chris Zuerner; Jeremy Smith; Fourth official: Kevin Uitto

=== Final ===
November 13, 2022	#2 Syracuse	2–0	#8 Clemson	Cary, NC
12:00 p.m. EST	Amferny Sinclair (yellow card) 11'; Lorenzo Boselli 21'; Giona Leibold 38'; Olu Oyegunle (yellow card) 67'; Christian Curti (yellow card) 74'	Report	(yellow card) 54' Brandon Parrish; (yellow card) 74' Dylan Sullivan	Stadium: WakeMed Soccer Park; Attendance: 2,913; Referee: David Erbacher; Assistant referees: Rick Rogers; Jude Carr; Fourth official: Aaron Gallagher

== Statistics ==
=== Goalscorers ===
There were 24 goals scored in 11 matches, for an average of 2.18 goals per match.

2 goals

- (United States) Brandon Parrish – Clemson
- (United States) Derek Waleffe – Clemson
- (United States) Michael Sullivan – Pittsburgh
- (Italy) Lorenzo Boselli – Syracuse

1 goal

- (Spain) Mohamed Seye – Clemson
- (United States) Bradley Sample – Louisville
- (United States) Ernest Bawa – North Carolina
- (United States) Luke Hille – NC State
- (Canada) Matthew Radivojsa – Notre Dame
- (France) Valentin Noël – Pittsburgh
- (Switzerland) Jackson Walti – Pittsburgh
- (Canada) Levonte Johnson – Syracuse
- (United States) Jeorgio Kocevski – Syracuse
- (Germany) Giona Leibold – Syracuse
- (Brazil) Leo Afonso – Virginia
- (United States) Reese Miller – Virginia
- (Norway) Andreas Ueland – Virginia
- (United States) Ethan Ballek – Virginia Tech
- (United States) Daniel Starr – Virginia Tech
- (United States) Omar Hernandez – Wake Forest

2 own goals

- Notre Dame (against Clemson)
- Notre Dame (against Clemson)

== All-Tournament team ==
Player	Team
**2022 ACC Men's Soccer All-Tournament team**
**Russell Shealy**	Syracuse
Lorenzo Boselli	Syracuse
Christian Curti	Syracuse
Jeorgio Kocevski	Syracuse
Hamady Diop	Clemson
Brandon Parrish	Clemson
Derek Waleffe	Clemson
Holden Brown	Virginia
Andreas Ueland	Virginia
Prince Amponsah	Wake Forest
Takuma Suzuki	Wake Forest

MVP in Bold
