= Nina King =

American college sports administrator

Current position
- Title: Athletic director
- Team: Duke
- Conference: ACC

Biographical details
- Born: October 3, 1978 (age 48); Tampa, Florida, U.S.
- Education: University of Notre Dame (BBA); Tulane University (JD)

Administrative career (AD unless noted)
- 2005–2008: Notre Dame (director of rules education)
- 2008–2021: Duke (senior deputy director)
- 2021–present: Duke

Nina E. King (born October 3, 1978) is an American college sports administrator who is currently the vice president, director of athletics and adjunct professor of business administration at Duke University. She was named the director of athletics for the Blue Devils following athletic director Kevin White's retirement on September 1, 2021, the third Black woman to be an athletic director in a power conference. In addition to her duties, she also served as the chair of the NCAA Division I Women's Basketball Committee, a role she held until the conclusion of the 2021–22 season.

King worked for Nike before joining her alma mater Notre Dame as their director of rules education, working under White. She followed him to Duke in 2008 to work as the senior deputy director of athletics, during which she was named to Sports Business Journal's "Forty under 40" list in 2018.
