= 2022 NCAA Division I men's soccer rankings =

- Season: 2022
- NCAA Tournament: 2022
- Preseason No. 1: Clemson
- NCAA Tournament Champions: Syracuse
NCAA Division I men's soccer rankings


Two major human polls make up the 2022 NCAA Division I men's soccer rankings: United Soccer Coaches and Top Drawer Soccer.

== Legend ==
	Increase in ranking
	Decrease in ranking
	New to rankings from previous week
Italics	Number of first place votes
(#–#)	Win-loss record
т	Tied with team above or below also with this symbol

== United Soccer Coaches ==
	Preseason Aug 2	Week 1 Aug 30	Week 2 Sep 6	Week 3 Sep 13	Week 4 Sep 20	Week 5 Sep 27	Week 6 Oct 4	Week 7 Oct 11	Week 8 Oct 18	Week 9 Oct 25	Week 10 Nov 1	Week 11 Nov 8	Final Dec 13	
1.	Clemson (8)	Clemson (7) (2–0–0)	Clemson (6) (3–0–0)	Clemson (7) (5–0–0)	Wake Forest (7) (7–0–0)	Wake Forest (8) (9–0–0)	Washington (5) (9–0–1)	Washington (6) (11–0–1)	Washington (6) (12–0–1)	Washington (5) (12–0–2)	Washington (6) (13–0–3)	Washington (7) (15–0–3)	Syracuse (19–2–4)	1.
2.	Georgetown	Pittsburgh (1) (2–0–0)	Stanford (4–0–0)	Wake Forest (5–0–0)т	Washington (1) (5–0–1)	Washington (7–0–1)	Duke (2) (7–0–2)	Kentucky (1) (8–0–2)	Kentucky (1) (8–0–4)т	Kentucky (2) (9–0–5)	Kentucky (2) (10–0–5)	Kentucky (1) (12–0–5)	Indiana (14–4–7)	2.
3.	Washington	Stanford (2–0–0)	Washington (3–0–0)	Stanford (4–0–1)т	Syracuse (6–0–1)	Marshall (5–1–1)	Kentucky (1) (7–0–2)	Duke (1) (8–0–3)	Duke (1) (9–0–3)т	Duke (1) (10–0–4)	Duke (11–0–4)	Syracuse (13–2–3)	Duke (13–2–4)	3.
4.	Notre Dame	UCLA (2–0–0)	Wake Forest (3–0–0)	Washington (4–0–1)	Marshall (4–1–1)	Duke (6–0–1)	Wake Forest (9–1–0)	Marshall (7–1–2)	Syracuse (11–2–1)	Syracuse (12–2–2)	Syracuse (12–2–3)	Duke (11–1–4)	Vermont (16–4–2)	4.
5.	Oregon State	Wake Forest (2–0–0)	Kentucky (2) (3–0–0)	Duke (4–0–0)	Kentucky (4–0–2)т	Kentucky (6–0–2)	Stanford (6–0–3)	Syracuse (10–2–1)	Stanford (7–1–4)	Stanford (9–1–4)	Marshall (9–2–3)	Stanford (10–2–5)	UNC Greensboro (13–2–6)	5.
6.	West Virginia	Kentucky (2–0–0)	Denver (3–0–1)	Kentucky (1) (4–0–1)	Stanford (4–0–3)т	Stanford (5–0–3)	Marshall (5–1–2)	Portland (8–0–3)	Marshall (7–2–2)	Marshall (8–2–3)	Stanford (9–2–5)	Maryland (10–2–5)	Kentucky (15–1–5)	6.
7.	Pittsburgh	Creighton (2–0–0)	Duke (3–0–0)	Marshall (4–1–0)	Duke (4–0–1)	Syracuse (7–1–1)	Syracuse (8–1–1)	Maryland (7–1–3)	Portland (8–1–3)	Portland (9–1–3)	Maryland (9–2–5)	UNC Greensboro (12–1–4)	Stanford (12–2–6)	7.
8.	Kentucky	Washington (2–0–0)	Marshall (2–1–0)	Maryland (3–1–1)	Pittsburgh (5–1–1)	Maryland (5–1–2)	Maryland (6–1–2)	Denver (7–2–4)	Maryland (7–2–4)	Maryland (8–2–4)	Vermont (13–2–1)	Vermont (13–2–2)	Pittsburgh (12–5–5)	8.
9.	New Hampshire	Maryland (1–0–1)	Akron (4–0–0)	Denver (4–1–1)	Maryland (4–1–1)	Portland (6–0–3)	Portland (7–0–3)	Stanford (6–1–4)	Xavier (9–0–5)	Louisville (9–3–3)	UNC Greensboro (11–1–4)	Denver (11–2–5)т	Creighton (13–5–6)	9.
10.	Saint Louis	Oregon State (1–0–1)	Louisvilleт (3–0–0)	Pittsburgh (4–1–0)	Clemson (7–1–0)	Pittsburgh (5–2–1)	Denver (6–2–2)	Wake Forest (10–2–0)	Vermont (11–1–1)	Lipscomb (11–1–2)	Denver (9–2–5)	Marshall (10–3–3)т	Portland (15–3–3)	10.
11.	Tulsa	Marshall (1–1–0)	Pittsburghт (3–1–0)	Charlotte (4–0–0)	Denver (4–1–2)	Ohio State (5–1–3)	Louisville (6–2–2)	Louisville (7–2–2)	Louisville (8–3–2)	UNC Greensboro (10–1–4)	Louisville (9–4–3)	Virginia (10–4–3)	Washington (15–2–3)	11.
12.	Duke	Charlotte (2–0–0)	Butler (3–0–0)	Tulsa (3–0–1)	Charlotte (6–0–0)	Tulsa (5–1–1)	Xavier (7–0–3)	Vermont (9–1–1)	Lipscomb (10–1–1)	SMU (9–3–1)	Lipscomb (11–2–2)т	Lipscomb (13–2–2)	Marshall (11–4–4)	12.
13.	Indiana	North Carolina (2–0–0)	Charlotte (3–0–0)	Portland (3–0–2)	Ohio State (5–0–2)	Denver (5–2–2)	Charlotte (7–1–0)	Xavier (8–0–4)	Ohio State (8–1–4)т	Ohio State (8–1–5)	Tulsa (9–2–2)т	SMU (10–4–1)	Clemson (13–7–1)	13.
14.	Marshall	Akron (2–0–0)	Maryland (2–1–1)	Akron (4–1–0)	Portland (4–0–3)	Charlotte (7–1–0)	Tusla (5–1–2)	SMU (8–2–1)	Charlotte (8–1–2)т	Tulsa (8–2–2)	Virginia (9–4–3)	Georgetown (10–4–3)	Cornell (14–4–1)	14.
15.	Wake Forest	Syracuse (2–0–0)	UCLA (4–1–0)	Indiana (2–1–1)	Akron (4–1–2)	Louisville (5–2–1)	Vermont (8–1–1)	Ohio State (6–1–4)	Denver (7–2–5)	Penn (10–1–2)	Cornell (12–3–0)	Akron (11–2–5)	Tulsa (10–5–2)	15.
16.	Providence	Tulsa (1–0–0)	Missouri State (2–0–2)	Syracuse (4–0–1)	Indiana (3–2–1)	Vermont (7–1–1)	Dayton (8–0–1)	Cornell (9–1–0)	Penn (9–1–1)	Missouri State (9–1–3)	SMU (9–4–1)	Ohio State (10–2–5)т	Virginia (10–4–5)	16.
17.	Hofstra	Duke (2–0–0)	Lipscomb (3–0–0)	Dayton (4–0–0)	Missouri State (4–0–2)	Clemson (7–2–0)	Ohio State (5–1–4)	Lipscomb (9–1–1)	UNC Greensboro (9–1–4)	Denver (8–2–5)	Georgetown (9–4–3)	Cornell (12–3–1)т	Maryland (11–4–5)	17.
18.	FIU	West Virginia (1–1–0)	Dayton (3–0–0)	UC Santa Barbara (4–1–1)	UNC Greensboro (5–0–2)	Xavier (6–0–3)	Lipscomb (8–1–1)	Clemson (8–2–1)	Missouri State (8–1–2)	Virginia (9–4–2)	Ohio State (9–2–5)	Clemson (12–5–1)т	SMU (10–6–1)	18.
19.	Missouri State	Georgetown (0–1–1)	UNC Greensboro (3–0–0)	Missouri State (3–0–2)	Xavier (5–0–2)	Dayton (6–0–1)	Missouri State (6–1–2)	Charlotte (7–1–2)	Dayton (9–0–4)	Xavier (9–1–5)	Akron (10–2–4)	Portland (11–2–3)т	FIU (13–5–2)	19.
20.	Maryland	Denver (2–0–0)	Tulsa (3–0–0)	Butler (3–1–0)	UCLA (5–2–1)	Penn State (4–2–2)	Akron (6–2–2)	Akron (7–2–3)	SMU (8–3–1)	Vermont (12–2–1)	New Hampshire (11–4–0)	Wake Forest (14–4–0)т	Georgetown (12–6–3)	20.
21.	Penn State	Indiana (0–1–0)	Georgetown (1–1–2)	Lipscomb (4–0–1)	Lipscomb (5–0–1)	UCLA (5–2–1)	Virginia (7–3–0)	Missouri State (7–1–2)	Cornell (9–3–0)	New Hampshire (11–3–0)	Penn (10–2–2)т	Saint Louis (11–4–1)т	New Hampshire (15–4–1)	21.
22.	Santa Clara	Notre Dame (1–1–0)	Notre Dame (1–1–0)	Ohio State (4–0–1)	Vermont (5–1–1)	Missouri State (5–1–2)	Cornell (7–1–0)	Dayton (8–0–3)	Tulsa (7–2–2)т	Charlotte (8–2–2)	Saint Louis (10–4–1)т	New Hampshire (12–4–0)	Lipscomb (14–3–2)	22.
23.	UCLA	Lipscomb (2–0–0)	West Virginia (1–2–0)	UNC Greensboro (4–0–1)	UCF (4–1–0)	Lipscomb (6–1–1)	Clemson (8–2–0)	UNC Greensboro (8–1–3)	Akron (8–2–4)т	Pittsburgh (7–3–4)	Missouri State (9–1–4)т	Penn (11–2–2)т	Akron (11–4–5)	23.
24.	North Carolina	Loyola Marymount (2–0–0)	Syracuse (3–0–1)	Xavier (5–0–1)	Dayton (5–0–1)	Duquesne (6–0–2)	UC Santa Barbara (7–2–2)	Tulsa (6–2–2)	Virginia (8–4–1)	Georgetown (8–4–3)	Pittsburgh (7–3–5)	Missouri State (10–1–4)т	Wake Forest (14–6–0)	24.
25.	Bowling Greenт; Campbellт	Missouri State (1–0–1)	Xavier (3–0–1)	UCLA (4–2–0)	Duquesne (6–0–1)т Louisville (4–2–1)т	Akron (4–2–2)	Pittsburgh (5–3–1)	Duquesne (8–1–3)	Wake Forest (11–3–0)	Cornell (11–3–0)	Portland (10–2–3)	FIU (11–4–1)	Saint Louis (12–5–3)	25.
	Preseason Aug 2	Week 1 Aug 30	Week 2 Sep 6	Week 3 Sep 13	Week 4 Sep 20	Week 5 Sep 27	Week 6 Oct 4	Week 7 Oct 11	Week 8 Oct 18	Week 9 Oct 25	Week 10 Nov 1	Week 11 Nov 8	Final Dec 13	
		Dropped: No. 9 New Hampshire; No. 10 Saint Louis; No. 16 Providence; No. 17 Hofstra; No. 18 FIU; No. 21 Penn State; No. 22 Santa Clara; No. 25т Bowling Green; No. 25т Campbell	Dropped: No. 7 Creighton; No. 10 Oregon State; No. 13 North Carolina; No. 21 Indiana; No. 24 Loyola Marymount	Dropped: No. 10т Louisville; No. 21 Georgetown; No. 22 Notre Dame; No. 23 West Virginia	Dropped: No. 12 Tulsa; No. 18 UC Santa Barbara; No. 20 Butler	Dropped: No. 16 Indiana; No. 18 UNC Greensboro; No. 23 UCF	Dropped: No. 20 Penn State; No. 21 UCLA; No. 24 Duquesne	Dropped: No. 21 Virginia; No. 24 UC Santa Barbara; No. 25 Pittsburgh	Dropped: No. 18 Clemson; No. 25 Duquesne	Dropped: No. 19 Dayton; No. 22т Akron; No. 25 Wake Forest	Dropped: No. 19 Xavier; No. 22 Charlotte	Dropped: No. 11 Louisville; No. 13 Tulsa; No. 24 Pittsburgh	Dropped: No. 9т Denver; No. 16т Ohio State; No. 23т Penn; No. 23т Missouri State	

== Top Drawer Soccer ==
	Week 1 Aug 19	Week 2 Aug 29	Week 3 Sep 5	Week 4 Sep 12	Week 5 Sep 19	Week 6 Sep 26	Week 7 Oct 3	Week 8 Oct 10	Week 9 Oct 17	Week 10 Oct 24	Week 11 Oct 31	Week 12 Nov 7	Week 13 Nov 14	Week 14 Nov 21	Week 15 Nov 28	Week 16 Dec 5	Final Dec 12	
1.	Clemson	Clemson (1–0–0)	Clemson (3–0–0)	Clemson (5–0–0)	Wake Forest (7–0–0)	Wake Forest (9–0–0)	Washington (9–0–1)	Washington (11–0–1)	Washington (12–0–1)	Washington (12–0–2)	Washington (13–0–3)	Washington (15–0–3)	Syracuse (14–2–4)	Syracuse (15–2–4)	Syracuse (16–2–4)	Syracuse (17–2–4)	Syracuse (18–2–5)	1.
2.	Washington	Washington (1–0–0)	Washington (3–0–0)	Duke (4–0–0)	Washington (5–0–1)	Washington (7–0–1)	Duke (7–0–2)	Duke (8–0–3)	Duke (9–0–3)	Duke (10–0–4)	Duke (11–0–4)	Kentucky (12–0–5)	Washington (15–1–3)	Kentucky (15–0–5)	Kentucky (15–1–5)	Kentucky (15–1–5)	Indiana (14–4–7)	2.
3.	Notre Dame	Oregon State (1–0–0)	Duke (3–0–0)	Wake Forest (5–0–0)	Pittsburgh (5–1–0)	Duke (6–0–1)	Kentucky (7–0–2)	Kentucky (8–0–2)	Syracuse (11–2–1)	Syracuse (12–2–2)	Kentucky (10–0–5)	Syracuse (13–2–3)	Kentucky (14–0–5)	Stanford (12–2–5)	Duke (13–1–4)	Duke (13–2–4)	Creighton (13–5–6)	3.
4.	Georgetown	West Virginia (1–0–0)	Wake Forest (3–0–0)	Washington (4–0–1)	Duke (4–0–1)	Kentucky (6–0–2)	Wake Forest (9–1–0)	Marshall (7–1–2)	Kentucky (8–0–4)	Kentucky (9–0–5)	Syracuse (12–2–3)	Duke (11–1–4)	Stanford (11–2–5)	Duke (12–1–4)	UNC Greensboro (13–1–6)	Indiana (13–4–6)	Pittsburgh (12–5–5)	4.
5.	Oregon State	Pittsburgh (1–0–0)	Pittsburgh (3–1–0)	Pittsburgh (4–1–0)	Maryland (4–1–1)	Marshall (5–1–1)	Maryland (6–1–2)	Portland (8–0–3)	Stanford (7–1–4)	Stanford (9–1–4)	Marshall (9–2–3)	Maryland (10–2–5)	Duke (11–1–4)	Washington (15–2–3)	Stanford (12–2–6)	UNC Greensboro (13–2–6)	Kentucky (15–1–5)	5.
6.	Providence	Duke (2–0–0)	UCLA (3–1–0)	Kentucky (4–0–1)	Kentucky (4–0–2)	Maryland (5–1–2)	Syracuse (8–1–1)	Maryland (7–1–3)	Maryland (7–1–4)	Marshall (8–2–3)	Tulsa (9–2–2)	Marshall (10–3–3)	UNC Greensboro (13–1–4)	UNC Greensboro (13–1–4)	Vermont (15–3–2)	Stanford (12–2–6)	Washington (15–2–3)	6.
7.	West Virginia	Wake Forest (2–0–0)	Georgetown (1–1–2)	Maryland (3–1–1)	Clemson (6–1–0)	Syracuse (7–1–1)	Marshall (5–1–2)	Syracuse (9–2–1)	Portland (8–1–3)	Tulsa (8–2–2)	Stanford (9–2–5)	Stanford (9–2–5)	Denver (13–2–5)	Vermont (14–3–2)	Washington (15–2–3)	Vermont (15–4–2)	UNC Greensboro (13–2–6)	7.
8.	Indiana	Notre Dame (0–1–0)	Notre Dame (1–1–0)	Indiana (2–1–1)	Syracuse (6–0–1)	Portland (6–0–3)	Portland (7–0–3)	Wake Forest (10–2–0)	Marshall (7–2–2)	Maryland (8–2–4)	Maryland (9–2–5)	Denver (11–2–5)	Maryland (10–3–5)	Marshall (11–3–4)	Indiana (12–4–6)	Washington (15–2–3)	Duke (13–2–4)	8.
9.	Pittsburgh	Georgetown (0–1–1)	Kentucky (3–0–0)	Marshall (4–1–0)	Marshall (4–1–1)	Stanford (5–0–3)	Stanford (6–0–3)	Missouri State (7–1–2)	Tulsa (7–2–2)	Portland (9–1–3)	Denver (9–2–5)	UNC Greensboro (12–1–4)	Virginia (10–4–4)	FIU (13–4–2)	Creighton (12–4–6)	Creighton (13–4–6)	Stanford (12–2–6)	9.
10.	Saint Louis	Indiana (0–1–0)	West Virginia (1–2–0)	Tulsa (3–0–1)	Charlotte (6–0–0)	Pittsburgh (5–2–1)	Missouri State (6–1–2)	Louisville (7–2–2)	Vermont (10–1–1)	Denver (8–2–5)	UNC Greensboro (11–1–4)	Virginia (10–4–3)	Lipscomb (14–2–2)	Cornell (14–3–1)	Marshall (11–4–4)	Pittsburgh (12–4–5)	Vermont (15–4–2)	10.
11.	Duke	Kentucky (1–0–0)	Indiana (0–1–1)	Georgetown (1–2–2)	Missouri State (4–0–2)	Clemson (7–2–0)	Clemson (7–2–0)	Denver (7–2–3)	Denver (7–2–5)	Louisville (9–3–3)	Vermont (12–2–1)	Vermont (12–2–2)	Marshall (10–3–3)	Denver (14–3–5)	FIU (13–5–2)	Marshall (11–4–4)	Marshall (11–4–4)	11.
12.	SMU	Maryland (1–0–1)	Tulsa (3–0–0)	Notre Dame (1–2–1)	UNC Greensboro (5–0–2)	Missouri State (5–1–2)	Denver (6–2–2)	Clemson (8–2–1)	Charlotte (8–1–2)	UNC Greensboro (10–1–4)	Akron (10–2–4)	Akron (11–2–5)	Clemson (13–6–1)	Virginia (10–4–5)	Cornell (14–4–1)	FIU (13–5–2)	FIU (13–5–2)	12.
13.	Tulsa	Tulsa (1–0–0)	Marshall (2–1–0)	Syracuse (4–0–1)	Ohio State (5–0–2)	Penn State (4–2–2)	UNC Greensboro (6–1–3)	UNC Greensboro (8–1–3)	UNC Greensboro (9–1–4)	Pittsburgh (7–3–4)	Portland (10–2–3)	Wake Forest (14–4–0)	FIU (13–4–1)	Lipscomb (14–3–2)	Portland (15–2–3)	Cornell (14–4–1)	Cornell (14–4–1)	13.
14.	Penn State	UCLA (2–0–0)	Louisville (3–0–0)	UCLA (4–1–0)	Portland (3–0–3)	UCLA (6–2–1)	Pittsburgh (5–3–1)	Stanford (6–1–4)	Pittsburgh (6–3–3)	Charlotte (8–2–2)	Virginia (9–4–3)	Clemson (12–5–1)	Vermont (12–3–2)	Tulsa (10–3–2)	Denver (14–3–5)	Portland (15–3–3)	Portland (15–3–3)	14.
15.	Kentucky	Hofstra (1–0–0)	Oregon State (1–1–1)	UNC Greensboro (4–0–1)	UCLA (5–2–1)	Charlotte (7–1–0)	Charlotte (7–1–0)	Pittsburgh (5–3–2)	Louisville (8–3–2)	Virginia (9–4–2)	Pittsburgh (7–3–5)	Tulsa (9–3–2)	Penn (12–2–2)	Indiana (11–4–6)	Virginia (10–4–5)	Denver (14–3–5)	Denver (14–3–5)	15.
16.	New Hampshire	Louisville (1–0–0)	Penn State (2–1–1)	SMU (4–1–0)	Indiana (3–2–1)	UNC Greensboro (5–1–2)	Louisville (6–2–2)	Indiana (5–2–4)	Missouri State (8–1–2)	Vermont (11–2–1)	Oregon State (6–3–5)	Pittsburgh (8–4–5)	Cornell (13–3–1)	Clemson (13–7–1)	Lipscomb (14–3–2)	Virginia (10–4–5)	Virginia (10–4–5)	16.
17.	Maryland	Saint Louis (0–2–0)	Saint Louis (1–2–0)	Missouri State (3–0–2)	Notre Dame (2–2–1)	Ohio State (5–1–3)	Ohio State (5–1–4)	Ohio State (6–1–4)	Wake Forest (11–3–0)	Missouri State (9–1–3)	Wake Forest (13–4–0)	Portland (11–2–3)	Portland (12–2–3)	Creighton (11–4–6)	Tulsa (10–4–2)	Lipscomb (14–3–2)	Lipscomb (14–3–2)	17.
18.	Hofstra	Marshall (1–0–0)	Denver (3–0–1)	Charlotte (4–0–0)	Penn State (3–2–1)	Tulsa (5–1–1)	Indiana (4–2–3)	Akron (7–2–3)	Indiana (6–2–4)	Ohio State (8–1–5)	Louisville (9–4–3)	Georgetown (10–4–3)	Rutgers (10–4–6)	Maryland (11–4–5)	Clemson (13–7–1)	Tulsa (10–4–2)	UCLA (11–7–1)	18.
19.	Wake Forest	Penn State (0–1–1)	Maryland (2–1–1)	Portland (2–1–2)	Stanford (4–0–3)	Indiana (3–2–2)	Akron (6–2–2)	Vermont (9–1–1)	Ohio State (8–1–4)	Wake Forest (12–4–0)	Missouri State (9–1–4)	Penn (11–2–2)	New Hampshire (14–4–0)	UCLA (11–6–1)	Maryland (11–4–5)	Clemson (13–7–1)	Tulsa (10–4–2)	19.
20.	UCLA	SMU (1–1–0)	SMU (3–1–0)	Stanford (4–0–1)	Denver (4–1–2)	Denver (5–2–2)	Vermont (8–1–1)	Charlotte (7–1–2)	Akron (8–2–3)	Akron (8–2–4)	Cornell (12–3–0)	Missouri State (10–1–4)	Missouri State (12–1–4)	Western Michigan (15–2–2)	UCLA (11–7–1)	Maryland (11–4–5)	Clemson (13–7–1)	20.
21.	Missouri State	Missouri State (0–0–1)	Campbell (3–0–1)	West Virginia (2–3–0)	Akron (4–1–1)	Akron (4–2–2)	Tulsa (5–1–2)	Tulsa (6–2–2)	Penn (9–1–1)	Indiana (7–3–4)	Georgetown (9–4–3)	Cornell (12–3–1)	Georgetown (11–5–3)	Portland (14–2–3)	Western Michigan (15–3–2)	UCLA (11–7–1)	Maryland (11–4–5)	21.
22.	Campbell	Campbell (1–1–0)	Akron (4–0–0)	Penn State (2–2–1)	FIU (4–2–0)	Memphis (5–1–1)	Dayton (8–0–1)	Cornell (9–1–0)	Clemson (8–4–1)	Penn (10–1–2)	FIU (10–4–1)	FIU (11–4–1)	Saint Louis (11–4–3)	Pittsburgh (10–4–5)	Pittsburgh (11–4–5)	Western Michigan (15–3–2)	Western Michigan (15–3–2)	22.
23.	FIU	North Carolina (2–0–0)	Stanford (4–0–0)	Denver (4–1–1)	Tulsa (3–1–1)	Vermont (7–1–1)	SMU (6–2–1)	SMU (8–2–1)	Cornell (9–3–0)	Cornell (11–3–0)	Lipscomb (11–2–2)	Lipscomb (12–2–2)	Oregon State (7–3–6)	Penn (13–3–2)	Penn (13–3–2)	Penn (13–3–2)	Penn (13–3–2)	23.
24.	Santa Clara	Grand Canyon (1–1–0)	Missouri State (2–0–2)	Ohio State (4–0–1)	Memphis (3–1–1)	Dayton (6–0–1)	Penn State (4–3–3)	Lipscomb (9–1–1)	SMU (8–3–1)	SMU (9–3–1)	Ohio State (9–2–5)	Ohio State (10–2–5)	Indiana (10–4–6)	New Hampshire (15–4–1)	New Hampshire (15–4–1)	New Hampshire (15–4–1)	New Hampshire (15–4–1)	24.
25.	St. John's	Akron (1–0–0)	Hofstra (1–2–0)	Akron (4–1–0)	SMU (4–2–1)	SMU (5–2–1)	UCLA (6–4–1)	Penn State (5–3–3)	Lipscomb (10–1–1)	Lipscomb (11–1–2)	Saint Louis (10–4–1)	Saint Louis (11–4–1)	Akron (11–3–5)	Georgetown (12–6–3)	Georgetown (12–6–3)	Georgetown (12–6–3)	Georgetown (12–6–3)	25.
	Week 1 Aug 19	Week 2 Aug 29	Week 3 Sep 5	Week 4 Sep 12	Week 5 Sep 19	Week 6 Sep 26	Week 7 Oct 3	Week 8 Oct 10	Week 9 Oct 17	Week 10 Oct 24	Week 11 Oct 31	Week 12 Nov 7	Week 13 Nov 14	Week 14 Nov 21	Week 15 Nov 28	Week 16 Dec 5	Final Dec 12	
		Dropped: No. 6 Providence; No. 16 New Hampshire; No. 23 FIU; No. 24 Santa Clara; No. 25 St. John's	Dropped: No. 23 North Carolina; No. 24 Grand Canyon	Dropped: No. 14 Louisville; No. 15 Oregon State; No. 17 Saint Louis; No. 21 Campbell; No. 25 Hofstra	Dropped: No. 11 Georgetown; No. 21 West Virginia	Dropped: No. 17 Notre Dame; No. 22 FIU	Dropped: No. 22 Memphis	Dropped: No. 22 Dayton; No. 25 UCLA	Dropped: No. 25 Penn State	Dropped: No. 22 Clemson	Dropped: No. 14 Charlotte; No. 21 Indiana; No. 22 Penn; No. 24 SMU	Dropped: No. 16 Oregon State; No. 18 Louisville	Dropped: No. 13 Wake Forest; No. 15 Tulsa; No. 16 Pittsburgh; No. 24 Ohio State	Dropped: No. 18 Rutgers; No. 20 Missouri State; No. 22 Saint Louis; No. 23 Oregon State; No. 25 Akron	Dropped: None	Dropped: None	Dropped: None	
