= 2021 Louisville Cardinals men's soccer team =

American college soccer season

2021 Louisville Cardinals men's soccer

NCAA Tournament, First Round
- Conference: Atlantic Coast Conference
- Record: 10–7–1 (5–3–0 ACC)
- Head coach: John Michael Hayden (3rd season)
- Assistant coaches: Bryan Green (3rd season); Donovan Dowling (3rd season)
- Home stadium: Lynn Stadium

2021 ACC men's soccer standings
	Conf.					Overall
Team	W		L		T	W		L		T
Atlantic
No. 1 Clemson +	5	–	3	–	0	16	–	5	–	2
Louisville +	5	–	3	–	0	10	–	7	–	1
No. 17 Wake Forest +	4	–	3	–	1	13	–	7	–	1
Boston College	2	–	4	–	2	6	–	7	–	2
Syracuse	2	–	5	–	1	8	–	8	–	2
NC State	1	–	5	–	2	7	–	8	–	2
Coastal
No. 12 Duke +	5	–	2	–	1	14	–	5	–	1
No. 6 Pittsburgh +	5	–	2	–	1	13	–	5	–	2
No. 4 Notre Dame ‡	4	–	2	–	2	14	–	5	–	5
North Carolina +	4	–	4	–	0	11	–	7	–	2
No. 19 Virginia Tech +	3	–	4	–	1	11	–	5	–	4
Virginia	2	–	5	–	1	6	–	9	–	3
‡ – ACC Tournament champion + – Also invited to the 2021 NCAA tournament; As of December 14, 2021; Rankings from United Soccer Coaches; Source: The ACC

The 2021 Louisville Cardinals men's soccer team represented the University of Louisville during the 2021 NCAA Division I men's soccer season. The Cardinals were led by head coach John Michael Hayden, in his third season. They played their home games at Lynn Stadium. This was the team's 43rd season playing organized men's college soccer and their 8th playing in the Atlantic Coast Conference.

The Cardinals finished the season 10–7–1 overall and 5–3–0 in ACC play to finish in second place in the Atlantic Division. As the fourth overall seed in the ACC Tournament the received a bye into the Quarterfinals, where they lost against fifth seed Notre Dame. They received an at-large bid to the NCAA Tournament where they lost in the First Round to Bowling Green to end their season.

== Background ==
The teams' 2020 season was significantly impacted by the COVID-19 pandemic, which curtailed the fall season and caused the NCAA Tournament to be played in spring 2021. The ACC was one of the only two conferences in men's soccer to play in the fall of 2020. The ACC also held a mini-season during the spring of 2021.

The Cardinals finished the fall season 1–6–1 and 1–4–1 in ACC play to finish in fifth place in the North Division. They were not invited to the ACC Tournament. They finished the spring season 4–2–0 and 4–2–0 in ACC play, to finish in second place in the Atlantic Division. They were not invited to the NCAA Tournament.

== Player movement ==
=== Players leaving ===
Departures
Name	Number	Pos.	Height	Year	Hometown	Reason for departure
Osmar Chavero	1	GK	6'0"	Freshman	Mission, TX	—
William Portman	2	DF	5'8"	Junior	Sheffield, England	—
Lamine Conte	3	MF	5'11"	(redshirt) Senior	Conakry, Guinea	Graduated; Drafted 40th overall by the New York Red Bulls in the 2021 MLS SuperDraft
Haji Abdikadir	4	FW	5'11"	Junior	Louisville, KY	Joined San Diego Loyal
Evil Elveroth	9	FW	6'0"	Senior	Halmstad, Sweden	Graduated
Carlos Sanchis	10	MF	5'7"	Senior	Madrid, Spain	Graduated
Elijah Amo	17	MF	5'10"	Senior	Lothian, MD	Graduated; Drafted 34th overall by Real Salt Lake in the 2021 MLS SuperDraft
William Howard	28	GK	6'5"	(redshirt) Junior	Chester, VA	Graduated
Sebastian Falsone	29	DF	6'1"	Freshman	Warrenton, VA	—
Jake Gelnovatch	31	GK	6'0"	(redshirt) Senior	Earlysville, VA	Graduated

=== Players arriving ===
Name	Nat.	Hometown	Club	TDS Rating
Jean Claude Bikorimana; MF	USA	Lexington, KY	FC Cincinnati U17	3/5 stars
Parker Forbes; DF	USA	Cedar Park, TX	Lonestar SC	3/5 stars
Dante Huckaby; DF	USA	Morganton, WV	Philadelphia Union	4/5 stars
Josh Jones; MF	USA	Hatfield, PA	Ukrainians Nationals	3/5 stars
Gavin Krenecki; GK	USA	Sacramento, CA	Sporting Kansas City Academy	4/5 stars

== Squad ==
=== Roster ===
As of January 26, 2022

Note: Flags indicate national team as defined under FIFA eligibility rules; some limited exceptions apply. Players may hold more than one non-FIFA nationality.

No.	Pos.	Nation	Player
1	GK	USA	Gavin Krenecki
2	DF	USA	Dante Huckaby
3	MF	USA	Jamie Diluzio
4	DF	USA	Bryce Lebel
5	DF	USA	Matty Walters
6	MF	MEX	Rafael Pinzón
7	FW	USA	Brandon McManus
8	MF	USA	Jack Fasteen
9	FW	USA	Aboubacar Camara
10	FW	BRA	Pedro Fonseca
11	FW	SEN	Macoumba Ba
12	DF	BER	Zeiko Harris
13	MF	USA	Bradley Sample
14	MF	GHA	Eric Danquah

No.	Pos.	Nation	Player
15	MF	USA	RC Schmeider
16	DF	USA	Josh Jones
17	FW	USA	Nico Diaz
18	DF	USA	Jack Hickey
19	MF	USA	Patrick Ajdukiewicz
20	DF	USA	Parker Forbes
21	MF	USA	Ayden Nocus
22	DF	USA	Axel Alejandre
23	FW	NGA	Ugo Achara
25	MF	USA	Jean Claude Bikorimana
27	DF	USA	Ryan Nichols
30	GK	BER	Detre Bell
31	GK	USA	Liam Fitzgerald
46	MF	NOR	Sander Roed

=== Team management ===
Position	Staff
Head coach	John Michael Hayden
Associate Head Coach	Bryan Green
Assistant Coach	Donovan Dowling
Volunteer Assistant Coach	Darren Yeagle
Director of Operations	James Kusak

== Schedule ==
Date Time, TV	Rank^{#}	Opponent^{#}	Result	Record	Site (Attendance) City, State
Exhibition
August 14*; 8:00 p.m.		at UAB	W 4–1	–	BBVA Field; Birmingham, AL
August 21*; 8:00 p.m.		at No. 2 Indiana	L 4–5	–	Bill Armstrong Stadium; Bloomington, IN
Regular Season
August 26*; 8:00 p.m., ESPN+		at Saint Louis	L 1–2 ^{2OT}	0–1–0	Hermann Stadium (2,224); St. Louis, MO
August 30*; 7:30 p.m., ACCNX		Evansville	W 2–1	1–1–0	Lynn Stadium (504); Louisville, KY
September 3*; 7:30 p.m., ACCNX		Bellarmine	W 1–0 ^{2OT}	2–1–0	Lynn Stadium (1,200); Louisville, KY
September 7*; 7:30 p.m., ACCN		No. 17 Kentucky; Rivalry	L 1–3	2–2–0	Lynn Stadium (1,679); Louisville, KY
September 10; 7:30 p.m., ACCNX		No. 25 Wake Forest	W 3–0	3–2–0 (1–0–0)	Lynn Stadium (1,307); Louisville, KY
September 17; 7:00 p.m., ACCNX		at Syracuse	W 5–4 ^{2OT}	4–2–0 (2–0–0)	SU Soccer Stadium (1,113); Syracuse, NY
September 21*; 7:30 p.m., ACCNX	No. 25	Northern Kentucky	W 4–0	5–2–0	Lynn Stadium (393); Louisville, KY
September 24; 7:30 p.m., ACCNX	No. 25	Boston College	W 2–0	6–2–0 (3–0–0)	Lynn Stadium (827); Louisville, KY
September 28*; 7:30 p.m., ACCNX	No. 14	Western Illinois	W 7–1	7–2–0	Lynn Stadium (482); Louisville, KY
October 1; 7:00 p.m., ACCNX	No. 14	at No. 4 Duke	L 1–3	7–3–0 (3–1–0)	Koskinen Stadium (1,017); Durham, NC
October 8; 6:00 p.m., ACCRSN	No. 23	at No. 9 Virginia Tech	L 2–4	7–4–0 (3–2–0)	Thompson Field (765); Blacksburg, VA
October 12*; 7:00 p.m., ACCNX		Eastern Illinois	W 5–0	8–4–0	Lynn Stadium (609); Louisville, KY
October 15; 7:00 p.m., ACCN		North Carolina	W 2–0	9–4–0 (4–2–0)	Lynn Stadium (562); Louisville, KY
October 19*; 7:00 p.m., ACCNX		Oakland	L 1–2	9–5–0	Lynn Stadium (0); Louisville, KY
October 22; 7:00 p.m., ACCNX		NC State	W 2–1	10–5–0 (5–2–0)	Lynn Stadium (608); Louisville, KY
October 29; 7:00 p.m., ACCN		at No. 15 Clemson	L 1–5	10–6–0 (5–3–0)	Riggs Field (1,889); Clemson, SC
ACC tournament
November 7; 6:00 p.m., ACCN	(4)	(5) No. 23 Notre Dame; Quarterfinals	T 0–0 (0–3 PKs) ^{2OT}	10–6–1	Lynn Stadium (582); Louisville, KY
NCAA tournament
November 18; 6:30 p.m., ACCNX		Bowling Green; First Round	L 0–1	10–7–1	Lynn Stadium (672); Louisville, KY
*Non-conference game. ^{#}Rankings from United Soccer Coaches. (#) Tournament seedings in parentheses. All times are in Eastern.

== Awards and honors ==
Recipient	Award	Date	Ref.
Pedro Fonseca	Preseason All-ACC Watchlist	August 18	
Aboubacar Camara	ACC Offensive Player of the Week	October 19	
Pedro Fonseca	All-ACC First Team	November 10	
Aboubacar Camara	All-ACC First Team	November 10	
Sander Roed	All-ACC Third Team	November 10	
Sander Roed	ACC All-Freshman Team	November 10	

== 2022 MLS SuperDraft ==
Player	Team	Round	Pick #	Position
Pedro Fonseca	Real Salt Lake	2	53	FW

== Rankings ==
Ranking movements Legend: ██ Increase in ranking ██ Decrease in ranking — = Not ranked RV = Received votes
	Week																
Poll	Pre	1	2	3	4	5	6	7	8	9	10	11	12	13	14	15	Final
United Soccer	—	—	—	RV	25	14	23	RV	RV	—	—	—	Not released				—
TopDrawer Soccer																	
