= 2021 Atlantic Coast Conference men's soccer season =

- League: NCAA Division I
- Sport: Soccer
- Duration: August 23, 2021 – October 29, 2021
- Teams: 12

2022 MLS SuperDraft
- Top draft pick: Thorleifur Úlfarsson, 4th overall
- Picked by: Houston Dynamo

Regular season
- Season champions: Atlantic:Clemson; Coastal:Pittsburgh
- Runners-up: Atlantic:Louisville; Coastal:Duke
- Season MVP: Offensive: Thorleifur Úlfarsson; Midfielder: Peter Stroud; Defensive:Jasper Löeffelsend

ACC Tournament
- Champions: Notre Dame
- Runners-up: Duke
- Finals MVP: (United States) Dawson McCartney

ACC men's soccer seasons
- ← 2020 2022 →

2021 ACC men's soccer standings
| | Conf. | | | | | Overall |
| Team | W | | L | | T | W | | L | | T |
|---|---|---|---|---|---|---|---|---|---|---|
Atlantic
| No. 1 Clemson + | 5 | – | 3 | – | 0 | 16 | – | 5 | – | 2 |
| Louisville + | 5 | – | 3 | – | 0 | 10 | – | 7 | – | 1 |
| No. 17 Wake Forest + | 4 | – | 3 | – | 1 | 13 | – | 7 | – | 1 |
| Boston College | 2 | – | 4 | – | 2 | 6 | – | 7 | – | 2 |
| Syracuse | 2 | – | 5 | – | 1 | 8 | – | 8 | – | 2 |
| NC State | 1 | – | 5 | – | 2 | 7 | – | 8 | – | 2 |
Coastal
| No. 12 Duke + | 5 | – | 2 | – | 1 | 14 | – | 5 | – | 1 |
| No. 6 Pittsburgh + | 5 | – | 2 | – | 1 | 13 | – | 5 | – | 2 |
| No. 4 Notre Dame ‡ | 4 | – | 2 | – | 2 | 14 | – | 5 | – | 5 |
| North Carolina + | 4 | – | 4 | – | 0 | 11 | – | 7 | – | 2 |
| No. 19 Virginia Tech + | 3 | – | 4 | – | 1 | 11 | – | 5 | – | 4 |
| Virginia | 2 | – | 5 | – | 1 | 6 | – | 9 | – | 3 |
‡ – ACC Tournament champion + – Also invited to the 2021 NCAA tournament; As of December 14, 2021; Rankings from United Soccer Coaches; Source: The ACC

The 2021 Atlantic Coast Conference men's soccer season was the 68th season of men's varsity soccer in the conference.

Clemson are the defending champions of the Atlantic Conference and the Pittsburgh are the defending champions of the Coastal Conference. Clemson is the defending ACC tournament Champion.

Clemson and Pittsburgh both retained their regular season titles in their respective conferences. However, Clemson could not defend its ACC Tournament crown, with Notre Dame prevailing in the 2021 tournament. Eight ACC teams were invited to the NCAA tournament. Clemson had the best showing of the eight, winning their third title in program history.

== Teams ==
=== Stadiums and locations ===
Atlantic Division
| Team | Stadium | Capacity |
|---|---|---|
| Boston College Eagles | Newton Campus Soccer Field | 2,500 |
| Clemson Tigers | Riggs Field | 6,500 |
| Louisville Cardinals | Lynn Stadium | 5,300 |
| NC State Wolfpack | Dail Soccer Field | 3,000 |
| Syracuse Orange | SU Soccer Stadium | 5,000 |
| Wake Forest Demon Deacons | Spry Stadium | 3,000 |

Coastal Division
| Team | Stadium | Capacity |
|---|---|---|
| Duke Blue Devils | Koskinen Stadium | 7,000 |
| North Carolina Tar Heels | Dorrance Field | 4,200 |
| Notre Dame Fighting Irish | Alumni Stadium | 2,500 |
| Pittsburgh Panthers | Ambrose Urbanic Field | 735 |
| Virginia Cavaliers | Klöckner Stadium | 8,000 |
| Virginia Tech Hokies | Thompson Field | 2,500 |

1. Florida State, Georgia Tech and Miami do not sponsor men's soccer

=== Personnel ===
| Team | Head coach | Years at school | Overall record | Record at school | ACC record |
|---|---|---|---|---|---|
| Boston College | Bob Thompson | 2 | 1–3–1 | 1–3–1 | 1–3–1 |
| Clemson | Mike Noonan | 12 | 337–179–46 | 124–66–33 | 48–33–15 |
| Duke | John Kerr Jr. | 14 | 192–148–43 | 111–89–30 | 44–51–16 |
| Louisville | John Michael Hayden | 3 | 15–16–3 | 15–16–3 | 8–10–2 |
| North Carolina | Carlos Somoano | 11 | 137–42–29 | 137–42–29 | 53–17–16 |
| NC State | George Kiefer | 5 | 192–122–61 | 30–28–14 | 9–19–9 |
| Notre Dame | Chad Riley | 4 | 29–24–4 | 29–24–4 | 11–15–2 |
| Pittsburgh | Jay Vidovich | 6 | 251–99–33 | 44–45–2 | 17–23–3 |
| Syracuse | Ian McIntyre | 12 | 202–139–62 | 95–75–33 | 18–35–16 |
| Virginia | George Gelnovatch | 26 | 345–139–59 | 345–139–59 | 93–66–32 |
| Virginia Tech | Mike Brizendine | 13 | 88–103–30 | 88–103–30 | 23–60–19 |
| Wake Forest | Bobby Muuss | 7 | 177–74–36 | 102–18–12 | 39–5–7 |

Notes

- Records shown are prior to the 2021 season
- Years at school includes the 2021 season
- ACC records include only years with current school.

== Preseason ==
=== Hermann Trophy ===
The preseason watch list for the Hermann Trophy was released on August 26, 2021.

| Player | Class | Position | School |
|---|---|---|---|
| Jasper Löeffelsend | Graduate Student | DF | Pittsburgh |
| Valentin Noël | Junior | FW | Pittsburgh |

=== Preseason Poll ===
The 2021 ACC Preseason Poll was announced on August 18, 2021. The league's 12 head coaches voted Pittsburgh as the preseason favorite, with 7 of the 12 votes. Full results of the preseason poll are shown below:

Atlantic Division
| Predicted finish | Team | Votes (1st place) |
|---|---|---|
| 1 | Clemson | 64 (9) |
| 2 | Wake Forest | 57 (2) |
| 3 | Louisville | 38 |
| 4 | Boston College | 36 (1) |
| 5 | NC State | 27 |
| 6 | Syracuse | 26 |

Coastal Division
| Predicted finish | Team | Votes (1st place) |
|---|---|---|
| 1 | Pittsburgh | 64 (9) |
| 2 | North Carolina | 58 (3) |
| 3 | Virginia Tech | 40 |
| 4 | Virginia | 32 |
| 5 | Duke | 28 |
| 6 | Notre Dame | 24 |

Media poll (ACC Championship)
| Rank | Team | Votes |
| 1 | Pittsburgh | 7 |
| 2 | Clemson | 3 |
| 3 | North Carolina | 2 |

=== Preseason awards ===
Preseason All-ACC Watchlist

| Position | Player | Class | School |
|---|---|---|---|
| Goalkeeper | Alec Smir | Graduate Student | North Carolina |
| Goalkeeper | Leon Krapf | (redshirt) Senior | NC State |
| Defender | Victor Souza | Junior | Boston College |
| Defender | Oskar Ågren | Junior | Clemson |
| Defender | Andreas Ueland | Junior | Virginia |
| Defender | Sivert Haugli | Senior | Virginia Tech |
| Midfielder | Peter Stroud | Sophomore | Duke |
| Midfielder | Valentin Noël | Junior | Pittsburgh |
| Forward | Pedro Fonseca | Senior | Louisville |
| Forward | Jack Lynn | Senior | Notre Dame |
| Forward | Deandre Kerr | Sophomore | Syracuse |
| Forward | Kyle Holcomb | Senior | Wake Forest |

== Regular season ==
Index to colors and formatting
ACC member won
ACC member lost
ACC member tied
ACC teams in **bold**

All times Eastern time.

=== Week 1 (Aug. 24 – Aug. 30) ===
| Date | Time (ET) | Visiting team | Home team | Site | Result | Attendance |
|---|---|---|---|---|---|---|
| August 26 | 5:00 p.m. | **No. 15 Virginia Tech** | Kansas City | Sentara Park • Harrisonburg, VA | **T** 2–2 (2OT) | N/A |
| August 26 | 7:00 p.m. | St. John's | **No. 6 Clemson** | Riggs Field • Clemson, SC | **W** 2–1 | N/A |
| August 26 | 7:00 p.m. | USC Upstate | **NC State** | Dail Soccer Field • Raleigh, NC | **W** 2–0 | 1,141 |
| August 26 | 7:00 p.m. | VCU | **No. 7 Wake Forest** | Spry Stadium • Winston-Salem, NC | **L** 0–2 | 1,296 |
| August 26 | 7:00 p.m. | Western Michigan | **Virginia** | Klöckner Stadium • Charlottesville, VA | **W** 2–1 | 1,815 |
| August 26 | 7:30 p.m. | Bucknell | **No. 4 North Carolina** | Dorrance Field • Chapel Hill, NC | **W** 7–0 | 1,227 |
| August 26 | 7:30 p.m. | Drexel | **Syracuse** | SU Soccer Stadium • Syracuse, NY | **W** 2–0 | 727 |
| August 26 | 8:00 p.m. | Duquesne | **No. 3 Pittsburgh** | Ambrose Urbanic Field • Pittsburgh, PA | **W** 7–0 | 1,310 |
| August 26 | 8:00 p.m. | **Louisville** | Saint Louis | Hermann Stadium • St. Louis, MO | **L** 1–2 (2OT) | 2,224 |
| August 27 | 7:00 p.m. | No. 2 Indiana | **Notre Dame** | Alumni Stadium • Notre Dame, IN | **L** 2–3 (OT) | 2,347 |
| August 27 | 7:30 p.m. | Liberty | **Duke** | Koskinen Stadium • Durham, NC | **W** 3–0 | 851 |
| August 28 | 4:00 p.m. | **Boston College** | Quinnipiac | Quinnipiac Soccer Stadium • Hamden, CT | **L** 1–2 | 226 |
| August 29 | 2:30 p.m. | Merrimack | **Duke** | Koskinen Stadium • Durham, NC | **W** 4–0 | 262 |
| August 29 | 3:30 p.m. | **No. 15 Virginia Tech** | No. 1 Marshall | Sentara Park • Harrisonburg, VA | **W** 3–2 | 113 |
| August 29 | 7:00 p.m. | Bucknell | **No. 7 Wake Forest** | Spry Stadium • Winston-Salem, NC | **W** 2–0 | 1,089 |
| August 29 | 7:00 p.m. | **Syracuse** | No. 11 Penn State | Jeffrey Field • State College, PA | **L** 0–3 | 2,073 |
| August 29 | 7:00 p.m. | USC Upstate | **No. 6 Clemson** | Riggs Field • Clemson, SC | **W** 5–0 | N/A |
| August 29 | 7:30 p.m. | VCU | **No. 4 North Carolina** | Dorrance Field • Chapel Hill, NC | **T** 1–1 (2OT) | 1,776 |
| August 30 | 5:30 p.m. | Boston University | **Boston College** | Newton Soccer Complex • Chestnut Hill, MA | **W** 2–1 | 750 |
| August 30 | 7:00 p.m. | NIU | **Notre Dame** | Alumni Stadium • Notre Dame, IN | **W** 2–0 | 456 |
| August 30 | 7:00 p.m. | **No. 3 Pittsburgh** | West Virginia | Dick Dlesk Soccer Stadium • Morgantown, WV | **L** 1–2 | 1,316 |
| August 30 | 7:00 p.m. | UNC Asheville | **NC State** | Dail Soccer Field • Raleigh, NC | **W** 4–0 | 1,589 |
| August 30 | 7:30 p.m. | Evansville | **Louisville** | Lynn Stadium • Louisville, KY | **W** 2–1 | 504 |

Players of the Week

| Offensive | | Defensive | |
| Player | Team | Player | Team |
|---|---|---|---|
| Veljko Petković | Pittsburgh | George Marks | Clemson |

=== Week 2 (Aug. 31 – Sept. 6) ===
| Date | Time (ET) | Visiting team | Home team | Site | Result | Attendance |
|---|---|---|---|---|---|---|
| September 2 | 7:00 p.m. | **No. 24 Duke** | Michigan | U-M Soccer Stadium • Ann Arbor, MI | **W** 1–0 | 0 |
| September 2 | 7:00 p.m. | High Point | **Virginia** | Klöckner Stadium • Charlottesville, VA | **W** 2–0 | 1,042 |
| September 3 | 4:00 p.m. | UCF | **No. 10 Virginia Tech** | Dail Soccer Field • Raleigh, NC | **W** 2–1 | 50 |
| September 3 | 7:00 p.m. | No. 2 Georgetown | **Syracuse** | SU Soccer Stadium • Syracuse, NY | **L** 0–1 | 1,674 |
| September 3 | 7:00 p.m. | Georgia Southern | **No. 6 North Carolina** | Dorrance Field • Chapel Hill, NC | **W** 3–0 | 498 |
| September 3 | 7:00 p.m. | Lehigh | **No. 3 Pittsburgh** | Ambrose Urbanic Field • Pittsburgh, PA | **W** 2–0 | 1,060 |
| September 3 | 7:00 p.m. | No. 20 Seton Hall | **NC State** | Dail Soccer Field • Raleigh, NC | **L** 1–3 | 842 |
| September 3 | 7:00 p.m. | South Carolina | **No. 4 Clemson** | Riggs Field • Clemson, SC | **W** 5–0 | 4,524 |
| September 3 | 7:30 p.m. | Bellarmine | **Louisville** | Lynn Stadium • Louisville, KY | **W** 1–0 (2OT) | 1,200 |
| September 3 | 7:30 p.m. | **Notre Dame** | No. 21 Kentucky | Bell Soccer Complex • Lexington, KY | **L** 0–1 | 1,589 |
| September 4 | 7:00 p.m. | Cornell | **No 18 Wake Forest** | Spry Stadium • Winston-Salem, NC | **W** 2–1 (2OT) | 1,491 |
| September 6 | 1:00 p.m. | **No. 10 Virginia Tech** | No. 20 Seton Hall | Dail Soccer Field • Raleigh, NC | **T** 3–3 (2OT) | 116 |
| September 6 | 5:30 p.m. | Hartford | **Boston College** | Newton Soccer Complex • Chestnut Hill, MA | **W** 1–0 | 615 |
| September 6 | 6:00 p.m. | **Virginia** | No. 11 Maryland | Audi Field • Washington, D.C. | **L** 1–2 | 1,987 |
| September 6 | 7:00 p.m. | **No. 6 North Carolina** | Davidson | Alumni Soccer Stadium • Davidson, NC | **W** 3–0 | 2,163 |
| September 6 | 7:00 p.m. | Niagara | **Syracuse** | SU Soccer Stadium • Syracuse, NY | **W** 2–0 | 896 |
| September 6 | 7:00 p.m. | **No. 3 Pittsburgh** | No. 19 Akron | FirstEnergy Stadium • Akron, OH | **L** 1–2 | 1,955 |
| September 6 | 7:00 p.m. | Seattle | **No. 24 Duke** | Koskinen Stadium • Durham, NC | **L** 0–1 (2OT) | 503 |
| September 6 | 7:00 p.m. | South Florida | **No. 4 Clemson** | Riggs Field • Clemson, SC | **W** 3–0 | 1,412 |
| September 6 | 7:00 p.m. | UCF | **NC State** | Dail Soccer Field • Raleigh, NC | **W** 2–1 | 802 |

Players of the Week

| Offensive | | Defensive | |
| Player | Team | Player | Team |
|---|---|---|---|
| Stefan Sigurdarson | Boston College | Eliot Hamill | Duke |

=== Week 3 (Sept. 7 – Sept. 13) ===
| Date | Time (ET) | Visiting team | Home team | Site | Result | Attendance |
|---|---|---|---|---|---|---|
| September 7 | 7:30 p.m. | No. 17 Kentucky | **Louisville** | Lynn Stadium • Louisville, KY | **L** 1–3 | 1,679 |
| September 10 | 7:00 p.m. | **No. 2 Clemson** | **NC State** | Dail Soccer Field • Raleigh, NC | **CLEM** 2–0 | 1,840 |
| September 10 | 7:00 p.m. | **No. 4 North Carolina** | **No. 15 Pittsburgh** | Ambrose Urbanic Field • Pittsburgh, PA | **PITT** 4–0 | 1,115 |
| September 10 | 7:00 p.m. | **Notre Dame** | **Boston College** | Newton Soccer Complex • Chestnut Hill, MA | **T** 1–1 (2OT) | 927 |
| September 10 | 7:00 p.m. | **Syracuse** | **Virginia** | Klöckner Stadium • Charlottesville, VA | **CUSE** 3–1 | 1,945 |
| September 10 | 7:30 p.m. | **No. 25 Wake Forest** | **Louisville** | Lynn Stadium • Louisville, KY | **LOU** 3–0 | 1,307 |
| September 11 | 7:00 p.m. | **No. 6 Virginia Tech** | **No. 19 Duke** | Koskinen Stadium • Durham, NC | **DUKE** 1–0 | 863 |
| September 13 | 7:00 p.m. | **No. 15 Pittsburgh** | Penn State | Jeffrey Field • State College, PA | **W** 1–0 | 1,518 |

Players of the Week

| Offensive | | Defensive | |
| Player | Team | Player | Team |
|---|---|---|---|
| Deandre Kerr | Syracuse | George Marks | Clemson |

=== Week 4 (Sept. 14 – Sept. 20) ===
| Date | Time (ET) | Visiting team | Home team | Site | Result | Attendance |
|---|---|---|---|---|---|---|
| September 14 | 7:00 p.m. | Binghamton | **Syracuse** | SU Soccer Stadium • Syracuse, NY | **W** 7–0 | 988 |
| September 14 | 7:00 p.m. | Campbell | **No. 16 North Carolina** | Dorrance Field • Chapel Hill, NC | **W** 1–0 | 538 |
| September 14 | 7:00 p.m. | Georgia Southern | **No. 2 Clemson** | Riggs Field • Clemson, SC | **W** 5–0 | 1,232 |
| September 14 | 7:00 p.m. | Holy Cross | **Boston College** | Newton Soccer Complex • Chestnut Hill, MA | **W** 3–2 (OT) | 381 |
| September 14 | 7:00 p.m. | James Madison | **NC State** | Dail Soccer Field • Raleigh, NC | **W** 2–1 | 520 |
| September 14 | 7:00 p.m. | Michigan State | **Notre Dame** | Alumni Stadium • Notre Dame, IN | **L** 3–4 | 351 |
| September 14 | 7:00 p.m. | UNC Greensboro | **Virginia** | Klöckner Stadium • Charlottesville, VA | **T** 0–0 (2OT) | 932 |
| September 17 | 7:00 p.m. | **Boston College** | **No. 2 Clemson** | Riggs Field • Clemson, SC | **CLEM** 3–0 | 3,032 |
| September 17 | 7:00 p.m. | **Louisville** | **Syracuse** | SU Soccer Stadium • Syracuse, NY | **LOU** 5–4 (2OT) | 1,113 |
| September 17 | 7:00 p.m. | **NC State** | **Notre Dame** | Alumni Stadium • Notre Dame, IN | **ND** 1–0 | 1,001 |
| September 17 | 7:00 p.m. | **Virginia** | **No. 17 Virginia Tech** | Thompson Field • Blacksburg, VA | **VT** 2–1 (2OT) | 2,725 |
| September 17 | 8:00 p.m. | **No. 5 Pittsburgh** | **Wake Forest** | Spry Stadium • Winston-Salem, NC | **WAKE** 3–1 | 2,176 |
| September 19 | 7:00 p.m. | **No. 12 Duke** | **No. 16 North Carolina** | Dorrance Field • Chapel Hill, NC | **DUKE** 3–0 | 2,310 |
| September 20 | 7:00 p.m. | **Wake Forest** | George Mason | George Mason Stadium • Fairfax, VA | **W** 1–0 | 175 |

Players of the Week

| Offensive | | Defensive | |
| Player | Team | Player | Team |
|---|---|---|---|
| Jacob Labovitz | Virginia Tech | Eliot Hamill | Duke |

=== Week 5 (Sept. 21 – Sept. 27) ===
| Date | Time (ET) | Visiting team | Home team | Site | Result | Attendance |
|---|---|---|---|---|---|---|
| September 21 | 7:00 p.m. | **Boston College** | Yale | Reese Stadium • New Haven, CT | **L** 0–2 | 511 |
| September 21 | 7:00 p.m. | **No. 2 Clemson** | UNC Greensboro | UNCG Soccer Stadium • Greensboro, NC | **L** 1–3 | 569 |
| September 21 | 7:00 p.m. | **Notre Dame** | Michigan | U-M Soccer Stadium • Ann Arbor, MI | **W** 3–1 | 317 |
| September 21 | 7:00 p.m. | **Syracuse** | Cornell | Berman Field • Ithaca, NY | **T** 1–1 (2OT) | 155 |
| September 21 | 7:00 p.m. | **Virginia** | James Madison | Sentara Park • Harrisonburg, VA | **L** 0–1 (2OT) | 564 |
| September 21 | 7:00 p.m. | **No. 12 Virginia Tech** | William & Mary | Albert–Daly Field • Williamsburg, VA | **W** 3–2 | 1,129 |
| September 21 | 7:30 p.m. | Northern Kentucky | **No. 25 Louisville** | Lynn Stadium • Louisville, KY | **W** 4–0 | 393 |
| September 24 | 7:00 p.m. | **Notre Dame** | **No. 12 Virginia Tech** | Thompson Field • Blacksburg, VA | **VT** 2–1 (OT) | 1,423 |
| September 24 | 7:00 p.m. | **Wake Forest** | **NC State** | Dail Soccer Field • Raleigh, NC | **T** 1–1 (2OT) | 1,570 |
| September 24 | 7:30 p.m. | **Boston College** | **No. 25 Louisville** | Lynn Stadium • Louisville, KY | **LOU** 2–0 | 827 |
| September 25 | 7:00 p.m. | **No. 6 Duke** | **Syracuse** | SU Soccer Stadium • Syracuse, NY | **DUKE** 1–0 | 1,879 |
| September 25 | 7:00 p.m. | **North Carolina** | **Virginia** | Klöckner Stadium • Charlottesville, VA | **UNC** 2–0 | 2,046 |
| September 25 | 7:00 p.m. | **No. 15 Pittsburgh** | **No. 2 Clemson** | Riggs Field • Clemson, SC | **PITT** 2–0 | 2,231 |

Players of the Week

| Offensive | | Defensive | |
| Player | Team | Player | Team |
|---|---|---|---|
| Matt Bailey | Pittsburgh | Eliot Hamill | Duke |
| Danny Flores | Virginia Tech | Eliot Hamill | Duke |

=== Week 6 (Sept. 28 – Oct. 4) ===
| Date | Time (ET) | Visiting team | Home team | Site | Result | Attendance |
|---|---|---|---|---|---|---|
| September 28 | 7:00 p.m. | East Tennessee State | **No. 11 Virginia Tech** | Thompson Field • Blacksburg, VA | **W** 2–0 | 511 |
| September 28 | 7:00 p.m. | Howard | **No. 4 Duke** | Koskinen Stadium • Durham, NC | **W** 4–0 | 739 |
| September 28 | 7:00 p.m. | Liberty | **Wake Forest** | Spry Stadium • Winston-Salem, NC | **L** 0–1 (2OT) | 1,287 |
| September 28 | 7:00 p.m. | **NC State** | Longwood | Longwood Athletics Complex • Farmville, VA | **W** 6–2 | 50 |
| September 28 | 7:00 p.m. | Trine | **Notre Dame** | Alumni Stadium • Notre Dame, IN | **W** 13–0 | 318 |
| September 28 | 7:00 p.m. | VCU | **Virginia** | Klöckner Stadium • Charlottesville, VA | **W** 3–1 | 880 |
| September 28 | 7:00 p.m. | Vermont | **Syracuse** | SU Soccer Stadium • Syracuse, NY | **W** 5–2 | 325 |
| September 28 | 7:30 p.m. | Western Illinois | **No. 14 Louisville** | Lynn Stadium • Louisville, KY | **W** 7–1 | 482 |
| September 29 | 7:00 p.m. | **North Carolina** | UNC Wilmington | UNCW Soccer Stadium • Wilmington, NC | **L** 1–2 | 1,321 |
| October 1 | 6:00 p.m. | **Virginia** | **Notre Dame** | Alumni Stadium • Notre Dame, IN | **ND** 2–1 | 1,213 |
| October 1 | 7:00 p.m. | **No. 19 Clemson** | **Wake Forest** | Spry Stadium • Winston-Salem, NC | **CLEM** 2–1 | 3,560 |
| October 1 | 7:00 p.m. | **No. 14 Louisville** | **No. 4 Duke** | Koskinen Stadium • Durham, NC | **DUKE** 3–1 | 1,017 |
| October 1 | 7:00 p.m. | **Syracuse** | **No. 16 Pittsburgh** | Ambrose Urbanic Field • Pittsburgh, PA | **PITT** 3–2 (2OT) | 1,097 |
| October 1 | 7:00 p.m. | **No. 11 Virginia Tech** | **Boston College** | Newton Soccer Complex • Chestnut Hill, MA | **T** 0–0 (2OT) | 1,956 |
| October 3 | 7:00 p.m. | **NC State** | **North Carolina** | Dorrance Field • Chapel Hill, NC | **UNC** 4–0 | 1,433 |

Players of the Week

| Offensive | | Defensive | |
| Player | Team | Player | Team |
|---|---|---|---|
| Thorleifur Úlfarsson | Duke | Charlie Asensio | Clemson |

=== Week 7 (Oct. 5 – Oct. 11) ===
| Date | Time (ET) | Visiting team | Home team | Site | Result | Attendance |
|---|---|---|---|---|---|---|
| October 5 | 1:30 p.m. | UNC Wilmington | **Virginia** | Klöckner Stadium • Charlottesville, VA | **T** 1–1 (2OT) | 76 |
| October 5 | 7:00 p.m. | **Boston College** | Northeastern | Parsons Field • Brookline, MA | **W** 2–1 | 221 |
| October 5 | 7:00 p.m. | **No. 21 Clemson** | Coastal Carolina | CCU Soccer Field • Conway, SC | **W** 2–0 | 858 |
| October 5 | 7:00 p.m. | Cleveland State | **No. 13 Pittsburgh** | Ambrose Urbanic Field • Pittsburgh, PA | **W** 4–0 | 430 |
| October 5 | 7:00 p.m. | Colgate | **Syracuse** | SU Soccer Stadium • Syracuse, NY | **W** 3–0 | 326 |
| October 5 | 7:00 p.m. | Elon | **No. 3 Duke** | Koskinen Stadium • Durham, NC | **W** 3–1 | 520 |
| October 5 | 7:00 p.m. | Purdue Fort Wayne | **Notre Dame** | Alumni Stadium • Notre Dame, IN | **W** 4–0 | 403 |
| October 5 | 7:00 p.m. | William & Mary | **Wake Forest** | Spry Stadium • Winston-Salem, NC | **W** 4–0 | 1,119 |
| October 8 | 6:00 p.m. | **No. 23 Louisville** | **No. 9 Virginia Tech** | Thompson Field • Blacksburg, VA | **VT** 4–2 | 765 |
| October 8 | 7:00 p.m. | **Boston College** | **Virginia** | Klöckner Stadium • Charlottesville, VA | **UVA** 2–1 | 0 |
| October 8 | 7:00 p.m. | **NC State** | **Syracuse** | SU Soccer Stadium • Syracuse, NY | **T** 0–0 (2OT) | 1,572 |
| October 8 | 7:00 p.m. | **Wake Forest** | **North Carolina** | Dorrance Field • Chapel Hill, NC | **WAKE** 2–1 | 1,283 |
| October 9 | 7:00 p.m. | **No. 3 Duke** | **No. 13 Pittsburgh** | Ambrose Urbanic Field • Pittsburgh, PA | **PITT** 3–2 | 1,409 |
| October 9 | 7:00 p.m. | **Notre Dame** | **No. 21 Clemson** | Riggs Field • Clemson, SC | **ND** 2–0 | 1,500 |
| October 11 | 7:00 p.m. | Denver | **Virginia** | Klöckner Stadium • Charlottesville, VA | **L** 1–2 (OT) | 992 |
| October 11 | 7:00 p.m. | **Syracuse** | Bucknell | Holmes Stadium • Lewisburg, PA | **W** 4–0 | 175 |

Players of the Week

| Offensive | | Defensive | |
| Player | Team | Player | Team |
|---|---|---|---|
| Daniel Russo | Notre Dame | Philip Quinton | Notre Dame |
| Guilherme Feitosa | Pittsburgh | Philip Quinton | Notre Dame |

=== Week 8 (Oct. 12 – Oct. 18) ===
| Date | Time (ET) | Visiting team | Home team | Site | Result | Attendance |
|---|---|---|---|---|---|---|
| October 12 | 7:00 p.m. | Davidson | No. 5 Virginia Tech | Thompson Field • Blacksburg, VA | **W** 4–0 | 435 |
| October 12 | 7:00 p.m. | Eastern Illinois | Louisville | Lynn Stadium • Louisville, KY | **W** 5–0 | 609 |
| October 12 | 7:00 p.m. | George Washington | Wake Forest | Spry Stadium • Winston-Salem, NC | **W** 3–0 | 1,127 |
| October 12 | 7:00 p.m. | High Point | NC State | Dial Soccer Field • Raleigh, NC | **W** 4–0 | 480 |
| October 12 | 7:00 p.m. | Wofford | North Carolina | Dorrance Field • Chapel Hill, NC | **W** 1–0 | 466 |
| October 15 | 7:00 p.m. | **No. 23 Clemson** | No. 9 Duke | Koskinen Stadium • Durham, NC | **CLEM** 3–2 (OT) | 1,204 |
| October 15 | 7:00 p.m. | **North Carolina** | Louisville | Lynn Stadium • Louisville, KY | **LOU** 2–0 | 562 |
| October 15 | 7:00 p.m. | **Syracuse** | Boston College | Newton Soccer Complex • Chestnut Hill, MA | **BC** 1–0 | 324 |
| October 15 | 7:00 p.m. | **Virginia** | NC State | Dial Soccer Field • Raleigh, NC | **UVA** 2–1 | 751 |
| October 16 | 7:00 p.m. | **No. 7 Pittsburgh** | Notre Dame | Alumni Stadium • Notre Dame, IN | **UND** 1–0 (2OT) | 385 |
| October 16 | 7:00 p.m. | **No. 5 Virginia Tech** | Wake Forest | Spry Stadium • Winston-Salem, NC | **WAKE** 3–1 | 3,026 |

Players of the Week

| Offensive | | Defensive | |
| Player | Team | Player | Team |
|---|---|---|---|
| Aboubacar Camara | Louisville | Paddy Burns | Notre Dame |

=== Week 9 (Oct. 19 – Oct. 25) ===
| Date | Time (ET) | Visiting team | Home team | Site | Result | Attendance |
|---|---|---|---|---|---|---|
| October 19 | 7:00 p.m. | **No. 18 Duke** | Furman | Stone Stadium • Greenville, SC | **W** 3–2 | 538 |
| October 19 | 7:00 p.m. | Loyola (MD) | **Wake Forest** | Spry Stadium • Winston-Salem, NC | **W** 7–0 | 1,021 |
| October 19 | 7:00 p.m. | No. 15 Loyola Marymount | **North Carolina** | Dorrance Field • Chapel Hill, NC | **W** 2–0 | 471 |
| October 19 | 7:00 p.m. | Oakland | **Louisville** | Lynn Stadium • Louisville, KY | **L** 1–2 | 0 |
| October 19 | 7:00 p.m. | UIC | **No. 20 Notre Dame** | Alumni Stadium • Notre Dame, IN | **W** 3–0 | 259 |
| October 19 | 7:00 p.m. | William & Mary | **NC State** | Dial Soccer Field • Raleigh, NC | **L** 0–1 | 369 |
| October 20 | 6:00 p.m. | Winthrop | **No. 13 Virginia Tech** | Thompson Field • Blacksburg, VA | **W** 3–0 | 551 |
| October 22 | 7:00 p.m. | **No. 18 Duke** | **No. 20 Notre Dame** | Alumni Stadium • Notre Dame, IN | **T** 1–1 (2OT) | 1,037 |
| October 22 | 7:00 p.m. | **NC State** | **Louisville** | Lynn Stadium • Louisville, KY | **LOU** 2–1 | 608 |
| October 22 | 7:00 p.m. | **No. 10 Pittsburgh** | **Virginia** | Klöckner Stadium • Charlottesville, VA | **T** 2–2 (2OT) | 0 |
| October 23 | 7:00 p.m. | **No. 6 Clemson** | **Syracuse** | SU Soccer Stadium • Syracuse, NY | **CUSE** 2–0 | 1,205 |
| October 23 | 7:00 p.m. | **Wake Forest** | **Boston College** | Newton Soccer Complex • Chestnut Hill, MA | **BC** 3–2 | 658 |
| October 24 | 7:00 p.m. | **North Carolina** | **No. 13 Virginia Tech** | Thompson Field • Blacksburg, VA | **UNC** 2–0 | 1,115 |
| October 25 | 1:00 p.m. | Mary Washington | Virginia | Klöckner Stadium • Charlottesville, VA | **W** 2–0 | 82 |
| October 25 | 7:00 p.m. | Massachusetts | **No. 10 Pittsburgh** | Ambrose Urbanic Field • Pittsburgh, PA | **W** 5–1 | 713 |

Players of the Week

| Offensive | | Defensive | |
| Player | Team | Player | Team |
|---|---|---|---|
| Milo Garvanian | North Carolina | Alec Smir | North Carolina |

=== Week 10 (Oct. 26 – Nov. 2) ===
| Date | Time (ET) | Visiting team | Home team | Site | Result | Attendance |
|---|---|---|---|---|---|---|
| October 26 | 7:00 p.m. | No. 17 FIU | No. 15 Clemson | Riggs Field • Clemson, SC | **W** 4–0 | 1,335 |
| October 29 | 4:30 p.m. | **No. 11 Notre Dame** | North Carolina | Dorrance Field • Chapel Hill, NC | **UNC** 3–1 | 1,481 |
| October 29 | 7:00 p.m. | **Boston College** | NC State | Dail Soccer Field • Raleigh, NC | **NCST** 1–0 (2OT) | 931 |
| October 29 | 7:00 p.m. | **Louisville** | No. 15 Clemson | Riggs Field • Clemson, SC | **CLEM** 5–1 | 1,889 |
| October 29 | 7:00 p.m. | **Syracuse** | Wake Forest | Spry Stadium • Winston-Salem, NC | **WAKE** 2–0 | 2,271 |
| October 29 | 7:00 p.m. | **Virginia** | No. 13 Duke | Koskinen Stadium • Durham, NC | **DUKE** 3–2 (OT) | 1,117 |
| October 29 | 7:00 p.m. | **No. 21 Virginia Tech** | No. 12 Pittsburgh | Ambrose Urbanic Field • Pittsburgh, PA | **PITT** 4–1 | 900 |

Players of the Week

| Offensive | | Defensive | |
| Player | Team | Player | Team |
|---|---|---|---|
| Quinn McNeill | Clemson | Trace Alphin | Notre Dame |
| Quinn McNeill | Clemson | Oskar Ågren | Clemson |

== Rankings ==
=== National ===
==== United Soccer Coaches ====
Legend
| Increase in ranking |
| Decrease in ranking |
| Not ranked previous week |

| | Pre | Wk 1 | Wk 2 | Wk 3 | Wk 4 | Wk 5 | Wk 6 | Wk 7 | Wk 8 | Wk 9 | Wk 10 | Wk 11 | Final |
|---|---|---|---|---|---|---|---|---|---|---|---|---|---|
| Boston College | | | | | | | | | | | | | |
| Clemson | 6 (1) | 4 (1) | 2 (6) | 2 (5) | 2 (4) | 19 | 21 | 23 | 6 | 15 | 9 | 9 | 1 (24) |
| Duke | | 24 | 19 | 12 | 6 | 4 | 3 | 9 | 18 | 13 | 13 | 11 | 12 |
| Louisville | | | | RV | 25 | 14 | 23 | RV | RV | | | | |
| North Carolina | 4 | 6 | 4 | 16 | RV | RV | RV | | | RV | 18 | 23 | RV |
| NC State | | RV | RV | | | | | | | | | | |
| Notre Dame | RV | | | | | | | RV | 20 | 11 | 23 | 20 | 4 |
| Pittsburgh | 3 (1) | 3 (3) | 15 | 5 | 15 | 16 | 13 | 7 | 10 | 12 | 6 | 5 (2) | 6 |
| Syracuse | | | | RV | | | | | | | | | |
| Virginia | RV | RV | RV | | | | | | | | | | |
| Virginia Tech | 15 | 10 | 6 | 17 | 12 | 11 | 9 | 5 | 13 | 21 | RV | RV | 19 |
| Wake Forest | 7 | 18 | 25 | RV | RV | RV | | RV | RV | RV | RV | RV | 17 |

==== Top Drawer Soccer ====
Legend
| Increase in ranking |
| Decrease in ranking |
| Not ranked previous week |

| | Wk 1 | Wk 2 | Wk 3 | Wk 4 | Wk 5 | Wk 6 | Wk 7 | Wk 8 | Wk 9 | Wk 10 | Wk 11 | Wk 12 | Wk 13 | Wk 14 | Wk 15 | Wk 16 | Final |
|---|---|---|---|---|---|---|---|---|---|---|---|---|---|---|---|---|---|
| Boston College | | | | | | | | | | | | | | | | | |
| Clemson | 8 | 6 | 3 | 2 | 2 | 10 | 9 | 15 | 6 | 17 | 15 | 15 | 17 | 14 | 8 | 4 | 1 |
| Duke | | | | 18 | 9 | 8 | 6 | 9 | 13 | 11 | 10 | 10 | 14 | 10 | 12 | 12 | 12 |
| Louisville | | | | | | | | | | | | | | | | | |
| North Carolina | 4 | 5 | 2 | 4 | 11 | 11 | 17 | | | 23 | 20 | 20 | 22 | 22 | 22 | 22 | 22 |
| NC State | | | | | | | | | | | | | | | | | |
| Notre Dame | | | | | | | | | | | | | 11 | 9 | 6 | 3 | 4 |
| Pittsburgh | 3 | 2 | 6 | 11 | 22 | 21 | 22 | 8 | 12 | 16 | 14 | 12 | 15 | 12 | 7 | 8 | 8 |
| Syracuse | | | | | | | | | | | | | | | | | |
| Virginia | | | | | | | | | | | | | | | | | |
| Virginia Tech | 19 | 18 | 18 | | | | | 21 | 21 | 25 | | | | | | | |
| Wake Forest | 6 | 8 | 8 | | 18 | 20 | | 19 | 18 | | | | | | | | |

== Postseason ==
=== ACC Tournament ===
Semifinals
1 | Pittsburgh | 0
5 | Notre Dame | 2
3 | Duke | 1
2 | Clemson | 0

Final
5 | Notre Dame | 2
3 | Duke | 0

=== NCAA tournament ===
The ACC sent eight teams to the NCAA tournament, which was the most of any conference. ACC teams also were four of the top eight seeds in the tournament.

| Seed | School | First round | 2nd Round | 3rd Round | Quarterfinals | Semifinals | Championship |
|---|---|---|---|---|---|---|---|
| 4 | Notre Dame | BYE | W 3–0 vs. Villanova – (Notre Dame, IN) | W 2–0 vs. Wake Forest – (Notre Dame, IN) | T 1–1 (4–2 PKs) vs. No. 5 Pittsburgh – (Notre Dame, IN) | T 1–1 (4–5 PKs) vs. No. 8 Clemson – (Cary, NC) | |
| 5 | Pittsburgh | BYE | W 5–2 vs. Northern Illinois – (Pittsburgh, PA) | W 4–0 vs. Hofstra – (Pittsburgh, PA) | T 0–0 (4–2 PKs) vs. No. 4 Notre Dame – (Notre Dame, IN) | | |
| 7 | Duke | BYE | W 2–1 vs. UCLA – (Durham, NC) | L 3–4 vs. No. 10 Saint Louis – (Durham, NC) | | | |
| 8 | Clemson | BYE | W 1–0 vs. Denver – (Clemson, SC) | W 2–1 vs. No. 9 Kentucky – (Clemson, SC) | T 0–0 (4–3 PKs) vs. No. 1 Oregon State – (Corvallis, OR) | T 1–1 (5–4 PKs)vs. No. 4 Notre Dame – (Cary, NC) | W 2–0 vs. No. 2 Washington – (Cary, NC) |
| | Louisville | L 0–1 vs. Bowling Green – (Louisville, KY) | | | | | |
| | North Carolina | T 0–0 (4–2 PKs) vs. Loyola (MD) – (Chapel Hill, NC) | L 1–4 vs. No. 16 New Hampshire – (Durham, NH) | | | | |
| | Virginia Tech | W 2–1 vs. Campbell – (Blacksburg, VA) | T 1–1 (3–4 PKs) vs. No. 11 West Virginia – (Morgantown, WV) | | | | |
| | Wake Forest | W 2–1 vs. Mercer – (Winston-Salem, NC) | W 3–2 vs. No. 13 FIU – (Miami, FL) | L 0–2 vs. No. 4 Notre Dame – (Notre Dame, IN) | | | |
| | W–L (%): | 2–1–1 (.625) | 5–1–1 (.786) | 3–2–0 (.600) | 0–0–3 (.500) | 0–0–2 (.500) | 1–0–0 (1.000) Total: 11–4–7 (.659) |

== Awards ==
=== Postseason awards ===
Postseason awards were released on November 10, prior to the ACC Tournament Semifinals.

==== All-ACC awards and teams ====
2021 ACC Men's Soccer Individual Awards
| Award | Recipient(s) |
| Coach of the Year | Jay Vidovich – Pittsburgh |
| Offensive Player of the Year | Thorleifur Úlfarsson – Duke |
| Midfielder of the Year | Peter Stroud – Duke |
| Defensive Player of the Year | Jasper Löeffelsend – Pittsburgh |
| Freshman of the Year | Shak Mohammed – Duke |

2021 ACC Men's Soccer All-Conference Teams
| First Team | Second Team | Third Team | All-Freshman Team |
| Oskar Ågren – Clemson; Peter Stroud – Duke; Thorleifur Úlfarsson – Duke; Aboubacar Camara – Louisville; Pedro Fonseca – Louisville; Alec Smir – North Carolina; Jack Lynn – Notre Dame; Jasper Löeffelsend – Pittsburgh; Deandre Kerr – Syracuse; Jacob Labovitz – Virginia Tech; Kyle Holcomb – Wake Forest | Hamady Diop – Clemson; George Marks – Clemson; Ousmane Sylla – Clemson; Shakur Mohammed – Duke; Rodrigo Almeida – Pittsburgh; Bertin Jacquesson – Pittsburgh; Valentin Noël – Pittsburgh; Arturo Ordoñez – Pittsburgh; Veljko Petkovic – Pittsburgh; Jackson Walti – Pittsburgh; Leo Afonso – Virginia | Victor Souza – Boston College; Quinn McNeill – Clemson; Sander Roed – Louisville; Joe Pickering – North Carolina; Filippo Zattarin – North Carolina; Philip Quinton – Notre Dame; Nico Campuzano – Pittsburgh; Mayola Kinyua – Virginia Tech; Nico Benalcazar – Wake Forest; Omar Hernandez – Wake Forest; Jake Swallen – Wake Forest | Aidan Farwell – Boston College; Ruben Mesalles – Duke; Shak Mohammed – Duke; Sander Roed – Louisville; Ken Bellini – North Carolina; Tega Ikoba – North Carolina; Josh Ramsey – Notre Dame; Matthew Roou – Notre Dame; Guilherme Feitosa – Pittsburgh; Curt Calov – Syracuse; Asparuh Slavov – Virginia; Danny Flores – Virginia Tech |

== MLS SuperDraft ==
A total of nineteen players were selected from ACC teams in the 2022 MLS SuperDraft. Their six first round picks and nineteen overall picks were the most of any conference in the draft. The nineteen total picks is the second highest in league history. Clemson had the most players selected with six.

=== Total picks by school ===
| Team | Round 1 | Round 2 | Round 3 | Total |
|---|---|---|---|---|
| Clemson | 1 | 3 | 2 | 6 |
| Duke | 2 | – | – | 2 |
| Louisville | – | 1 | – | 1 |
| NC State | – | – | 1 | 1 |
| North Carolina | – | – | 1 | 1 |
| Notre Dame | 3 | – | – | 3 |
| Pittsburgh | – | 1 | 1 | 2 |
| Virginia Tech | – | – | 1 | 1 |
| Wake Forest | – | 1 | 1 | 2 |
| Total | 6 | 6 | 7 | 19 |

=== List of selections ===
| Round | Pick # | MLS team | Player | Position | College |
|---|---|---|---|---|---|
| 1 | 4 | Houston Dynamo | (Iceland) Thorleifur Úlfarsson | FW | Duke |
| 1 | 13 | San Jose Earthquakes | (Sweden) Oskar Ågren | DF | Clemson |
| 1 | 14 | FC Cincinnati | (United States) Ian Murphy | DF | Duke |
| 1 | 18 | Orlando City | (United States) Jack Lynn | FW | Notre Dame |
| 1 | 23 | Colorado Rapids | (Canada) Mohamed Omar | MF | Notre Dame |
| 1 | 25 | Columbus Crew | (United States) Philip Quinton | DF | Notre Dame |
| 2 | 29 | Charlotte FC | (United States) Kyle Holcomb | FW | Wake Forest |
| 2 | 35 | Austin FC | (United States) Charlie Asensio | DF | Clemson |
| 2 | 39 | Houston Dynamo | (Spain) Arturo Ordoñez | DF | Pittsburgh |
| 2 | 42 | LA Galaxy | (United States) Callum Johnson | MF | Clemson |
| 2 | 44 | Vancouver Whitecaps | (Ecuador) Luis Felipe Fernandez-Salvador | MF | Clemson |
| 2 | 53 | Real Salt Lake | (Brazil) Pedro Fonseca | FW | Louisville |
| 3 | 57 | Charlotte FC | (United States) George Marks | GK | Clemson |
| 3 | 62 | FC Dallas | (United States) Alec Smir | GK | North Carolina |
| 3 | 64 | San Jose Earthquakes | (United States) John Martin | MF | Clemson |
| 3 | 67 | CF Montréal | (Haiti) Ivy Brisma | FW | NC State |
| 3 | 81 | Real Salt Lake | (Germany) Jasper Löeffelsend | DF | Pittsburgh |
| 3 | 83 | Portland Timbers | (Norway) Sivert Haugli | DF | Virginia Tech |
| Compensatory | 87 | FC Dallas | (United States) Holland Rula | DF | Wake Forest |

== Homegrown players ==
The Homegrown Player Rule is a Major League Soccer program that allows MLS teams to sign local players from their own development academies directly to MLS first team rosters. Before the creation of the rule in 2008, every player entering Major League Soccer had to be assigned through one of the existing MLS player allocation processes, such as the MLS SuperDraft.

To place a player on its homegrown player list, making him eligible to sign as a homegrown player, players must have resided in that club's home territory and participated in the club's youth development system for at least one year. Players can play college soccer and still be eligible to sign a homegrown contract.

| Original MLS team | Player | Pos. | School | Ref. |
|---|---|---|---|---|
| Portland Timbers | Tega Ikoba | FW | North Carolina | |
| New York City FC | Nico Benalcazar | DF | Wake Forest | |
| Toronto FC | Deandre Kerr | FW | Syracuse | |
