= 2021 ACC tournament =

2021 ACC tournament may refer to:

- 2021 ACC men's basketball tournament
- 2021 ACC women's basketball tournament
- 2021 ACC men's soccer tournament
