= 2021 ACC men's soccer tournament =

Soccer tournament

- Classification: Division I
- Teams: 12
- Matches: 11
- Attendance: 16,325
- Site: Campus Sites; WakeMed Soccer Park; Cary, North Carolina
- Champions: Notre Dame (1st title)
- Winning coach: Chad Riley (1st title)
- MVP: Dawson McCartney (Notre Dame)
- Broadcast: ESPNU (Final), ACC Network

2021 ACC men's soccer standings
	Conf.					Overall
Team	W		L		T	W		L		T
Atlantic
No. 1 Clemson +	5	–	3	–	0	16	–	5	–	2
Louisville +	5	–	3	–	0	10	–	7	–	1
No. 17 Wake Forest +	4	–	3	–	1	13	–	7	–	1
Boston College	2	–	4	–	2	6	–	7	–	2
Syracuse	2	–	5	–	1	8	–	8	–	2
NC State	1	–	5	–	2	7	–	8	–	2
Coastal
No. 12 Duke +	5	–	2	–	1	14	–	5	–	1
No. 6 Pittsburgh +	5	–	2	–	1	13	–	5	–	2
No. 4 Notre Dame ‡	4	–	2	–	2	14	–	5	–	5
North Carolina +	4	–	4	–	0	11	–	7	–	2
No. 19 Virginia Tech +	3	–	4	–	1	11	–	5	–	4
Virginia	2	–	5	–	1	6	–	9	–	3
‡ – ACC Tournament champion + – Also invited to the 2021 NCAA tournament; As of December 14, 2021; Rankings from United Soccer Coaches; Source: The ACC

The 2021 ACC men's soccer tournament was the 35th edition of the ACC Men's Soccer Tournament. The tournament decided the Atlantic Coast Conference champion and a guaranteed representative into the 2021 NCAA Division I Men's Soccer Tournament. The final was played at WakeMed Soccer Park in Cary, North Carolina.

The Clemson Tigers were the defending champions, but were unable to defend their title, as they fell to Duke in the semifinals. Notre Dame won their first ACC title, by defeating NC State in the first round, Louisville on penalties in the quarterfinals, Pittsburgh in the semifinals, and Duke in the final, 2–0. It was also the first ACC title for head coach Chad Riley. Notre Dame was the 5 seed entering the tournament, and they became the lowest seeded team to win since Syracuse in 2015, who won as the 7th seed.

== Qualification ==
All twelve teams in the Atlantic Coast Conference earned a berth into the ACC Tournament. The winners of each division, Atlantic and Coastal, were seeds 1 and 2. The top 4 seeds received first round byes and hosted the winner of a first-round game. The remaining 10 teams in the conference were seeded according to points awarded in conference matches. All rounds, with the exception of the final were held at the higher seed's home field. Seeding was determined by regular season conference record.

(*: division winners are automatically given the top two seeds).

Seed	School	Conference Record	Points	Tiebreaker notes
1	Pittsburgh	5–2–1	16*	3–2 vs. Duke
2	Clemson	5–3	15*	5–1 vs Louisville
3	Duke	5–2–1	16	2–3 vs Pittsburgh
4	Louisville	5–3	15	1–5 vs. Clemson
5	Notre Dame	4–2–2	14	
6	Wake Forest	4–3–1	13	
7	North Carolina	4–4	12	
8	Virginia Tech	3–3–1	10	
9	Boston College	2–4–2	8	
10	Syracuse	2–5–1	7	3–1 vs. Virginia
11	Virginia	2–5–1	7	1–3 vs. Syracuse
12	NC State	1–5–2	5	

== Bracket ==
*Note: Home team listed first. Rankings shown are ACC Tournament Seeds.

First Round; November 3
8	Virginia Tech (a.e.t.)	1
9	Boston College	0
5	Notre Dame	1
12	NC State	0
6	Wake Forest	3
11	Virginia	0
7	North Carolina (a.e.t.)	1
10	Syracuse	0

Quarterfinals; November 7
1	Pittsburgh (a.e.t.)	2
8	Virginia Tech	1
4	Louisville	0 (0)
5	Notre Dame (p)	0 (3)
3	Duke	3
6	Wake Forest	2
2	Clemson	2
7	North Carolina	1

Semifinals; November 10
1	Pittsburgh	0
5	Notre Dame	2
3	Duke	1
2	Clemson	0

Final; November 14
5	Notre Dame	2
3	Duke	0

== Matches ==
=== First round ===
November 3 Match 1	#7 North Carolina	1–0 (a.e.t.)	#10 Syracuse	Chapel Hill, NC
6:00 p.m.	Joe Pickering (yellow card) 15'; Riley Thomas (yellow card) 36' (yellow-red card) 90'; Milo Garvanian 106' (pen.)	Report	(yellow card) 54' Jeorgio Kocevski; (yellow card) 58' Noah Singelmann; (yellow card) 97' (yellow-red card) 102' Hilli Goldhar; (yellow card) 105' Christian Curti	Stadium: Dorrance Field; Attendance: 544; Referee: Andrea Pileri; Assistant referees: Benjamin Wooten; Heath Hixson; Fourth official: David McPhun

November 3 Match 2	#8 Virginia Tech	1–0 (a.e.t.)	#9 Boston College	Blacksburg, VA
7:00 p.m.	Jack Dearie 97'	Report	(yellow card) 68' Stefan Sigurdarson; (yellow card) 92' Kristofer Konradsson	Stadium: Thompson Field; Attendance: 1,535; Referee: David Erbacher; Assistant referees: Rick Rogers; Hudson Owens; Fourth official: Anthony Wolford

November 3 Match 3	#5 Notre Dame	1–0	#12 NC State	Notre Dame, IN
7:00 p.m.	Jack Lynn (yellow card) 42'; Dawson McCartney 53' (pen.); Tyler Shea (yellow card) 88'	Report		Stadium: Alumni Stadium; Attendance: 174; Referee: Carmen Serbio; Assistant referees: Peter Charpentier; Khalaf Al-Latayfeh; Fourth official: Justin Bell

November 3 Match 4	#6 Wake Forest	3–0	#11 Virginia	Winston-Salem, NC
8:00 p.m.	Omar Hernandez 21'; Kyle Holcomb 42'; Julian Kennedy (yellow card) 43'; Leo Guarino 69'	Report	(yellow card) 2' Andreas Ueland; (yellow card) 27' Daniel Wright; (yellow card) 54' Jeremy Verley	Stadium: Spry Stadium; Attendance: 1,034; Referee: Sorin Stoica; Assistant referees: Raymond Thomas; John Rush; Fourth official: Kevin Maurer

=== Quarterfinals ===
November 7 Match 5	#3 Duke	3–2	#6 Wake Forest	Durham, NC
2:00 p.m.	Ian Murphy (yellow card) 25'; Thorleifur Úlfarsson 30', 31'; Shak Mohammed (yellow card) 49'; Jai Bean 77'; Connor Kelly (yellow card) 86' (yellow-red card) 90'; Amir Daley (yellow card) 87'	Report	27' Jake Swallen; (yellow card) 41' (yellow-red card) 87' Babacar Niang; 45', (yellow card) 73' Nico Benalcazar	Stadium: Koskinen Stadium; Attendance: 1,062; Referee: Andrea Pileri; Assistant referees: Gabriel Rivera; Dustin Thorne; Fourth official: Aaron Gallagher

November 7 Match 6	#1 Pittsburgh	2–1 (a.e.t.)	#8 Virginia Tech	Pittsburgh, PA
4:00 p.m.	Valentin Noël 5', 103'; Mohammad Abualnadi (yellow card) 26'	Report	9' Kyle McDowell; (yellow card) 32' Sivert Haugli; (yellow card) 63' Andrew Weber; (yellow card) 76' Chris Nicola; (yellow card) 86' Nick Blacklock; (yellow card) 95' Danny Flores	Stadium: Ambrose Urbanic Field; Attendance: 1,443; Referee: Nikola Aleksic; Assistant referees: John Safar; Ross Kleinstuber; Fourth official: Lucas Feathers

November 7 Match 7	#4 Louisville	0–0 (a.e.t.) (0–3 p)	#5 Notre Dame	Louisville, KY
6:00 p.m.	Ugo Achara (yellow card) 69'; Jamie DiLuzio (yellow card) 108'	Report		Stadium: Lynn Stadium; Attendance: 582; Referee: John Brady; Assistant referees: Johann Pedolzky; Dean Morgan; Fourth official: Caleb Riley
	Penalties
	Pedro Fonseca (penalty missed); Sander Roed (penalty missed); Detre Bell (penalty missed)		(penalty scored) Jack Lynn; (penalty scored) Paddy Burns; (penalty scored) Dawson McCartney

November 7 Match 8	#2 Clemson	2–1	#7 North Carolina	Clemson, SC
8:00 p.m.	Isaiah Reid 37'; Quinn McNeill 76'; Mohamed Seye (yellow card) 83'	Report	20' Santiago Herrera; (yellow card) 57' Filippo Zattarin	Stadium: Riggs Field; Attendance: 2,351; Referee: Mike Stutt; Assistant referees: Kevin Huet; Rick Rogers; Fourth official: Ralph Polson

=== Semifinals ===
November 10 Semifinal 1	#1 Pittsburgh	0–2	#5 Notre Dame	Pittsburgh, PA
5:00 p.m. EDT	Arturo Ordonez (yellow card) 38'	Report	(yellow card) 43' Reese Mayer; 77' Jack Lynn; 77' Daniel Russo; (yellow card) 79' Dawson McCartney; (yellow card) 88' Josh Ramsey	Stadium: Ambrose Urbanic Field; Attendance: 1,626; Referee: Carmen Serbio; Assistant referees: Ankur Singh; William Aten; Fourth official: Taylor Bombalski

November 10 Semifinal 2	#2 Clemson	0–1	#3 Duke	Clemson, SC
7:00 p.m. EDT	Hamady Diop (yellow card) 19'	Report	(yellow card) 26' Shak Mohammed; 27' (pen.), (yellow card) 34' Thorleifur Úlfarsson; (yellow card) 52' Ian Murphy; (yellow card) 70' Peter Stroud	Stadium: Riggs Field; Attendance: 3,237; Referee: David Erbacher; Assistant referees: John Rush; Chris Zuerner; Fourth official: Wilmer Soriano

=== Final ===
November 14	#5 Notre Dame	2–0	#3 Duke	Cary, NC
2:00 p.m. EDT	Dawson McCartney 4', 76'; Tyler Shea (yellow card) 62'	Report	(yellow card) 36' Cameron Kerr; (yellow card) 75' Ruben Mesalles	Stadium: WakeMed Soccer Park; Attendance: 2,737; Referee: John McCloskey; Assistant referees: Benjamin Wooten; Johann Pedolzky; Fourth official: Jude Carr

== Statistics ==
=== Goalscorers ===
There were 22 goals scored in 11 matches, for an average of 2 goals per match.

3 goals

- (United States) Dawson McCartney – Notre Dame
- (Iceland) Thorleifur Úlfarsson – Duke

2 goals

- (France) Valentin Noël – Pittsburgh

1 goal

- (United States) Quinn McNeill – Clemson
- (United States) Isaiah Reid – Clemson
- (Bermuda) Jai Bean – Duke
- (United States) Milo Garvanian – North Carolina
- (Venezuela) Santiago Herrera – North Carolina
- (United States) Jack Lynn – Notre Dame
- (United States) Daniel Russo – Notre Dame
- (United States) Jack Dearie – Virginia Tech
- (England) Kyle McDowell – Virginia Tech
- (United States) Nico Benalcazar – Wake Forest
- (United States) Leo Guarino – Wake Forest
- (United States) Omar Hernandez – Wake Forest
- (United States) Kyle Holcomb – Wake Forest
- (United States) Jake Swallen – Wake Forest

== All-Tournament team ==
Player	Team
**2021 ACC Men's Soccer All-Tournament team**
Bryan Dowd	Notre Dame
Jack Lynn	Notre Dame
**Dawson McCartney**	Notre Dame
Philip Quinton	Notre Dame
Shak Mohammed	Duke
Peter Stroud	Duke
Thorleifur Úlfarsson	Duke
Oskar Ågren	Clemson
Quinn McNeill	Clemson
Valentin Noël	Pittsburgh
Arturo Ordoñez	Pittsburgh

MVP in Bold
