= 2021 Duke Blue Devils men's soccer team =

American college soccer season

2021 Duke Blue Devils men's soccer

NCAA Tournament, Third Round
- Conference: Atlantic Coast Conference
- U. Soc. Coaches poll: No. 12
- TopDrawerSoccer.com: No. 12
- Record: 14–5–1 (5–2–1 ACC)
- Head coach: John Kerr (14th season)
- Assistant coaches: Michael Brady (14th season); Kyle Renfro (2nd season)
- Home stadium: Koskinen Stadium

2021 ACC men's soccer standings
	Conf.					Overall
Team	W		L		T	W		L		T
Atlantic
No. 1 Clemson +	5	–	3	–	0	16	–	5	–	2
Louisville +	5	–	3	–	0	10	–	7	–	1
No. 17 Wake Forest +	4	–	3	–	1	13	–	7	–	1
Boston College	2	–	4	–	2	6	–	7	–	2
Syracuse	2	–	5	–	1	8	–	8	–	2
NC State	1	–	5	–	2	7	–	8	–	2
Coastal
No. 12 Duke +	5	–	2	–	1	14	–	5	–	1
No. 6 Pittsburgh +	5	–	2	–	1	13	–	5	–	2
No. 4 Notre Dame ‡	4	–	2	–	2	14	–	5	–	5
North Carolina +	4	–	4	–	0	11	–	7	–	2
No. 19 Virginia Tech +	3	–	4	–	1	11	–	5	–	4
Virginia	2	–	5	–	1	6	–	9	–	3
‡ – ACC Tournament champion + – Also invited to the 2021 NCAA tournament; As of December 14, 2021; Rankings from United Soccer Coaches; Source: The ACC

The 2021 Duke Blue Devils men's soccer team represented Duke University during the 2021 NCAA Division I men's soccer season. The Blue Devils were led by head coach John Kerr, in his fourteenth season. They played their home games at Koskinen Stadium. The team was founded in 1935 and currently plays in the Atlantic Coast Conference.

The Blue Devils finished the season 14–5–1 overall and 5–2–1 in ACC play to finish in a tie for first place in the Coastal Division. As the third overall seed in the ACC Tournament, the received a bye into the Quarterfinals where they defeated Wake Forest and then defeated Clemson in the Semifinals. They fell in the final to Notre Dame. They received an at-large bid to the NCAA Tournament and were awarded the seventh seed. Being a seeded team, they received a bye into the Second Round where they defeated UCLA before losing to tenth seeded Saint Louis in the Third Round.

== Background ==
The teams' 2020 season was significantly impacted by the COVID-19 pandemic, which curtailed the fall season and caused the NCAA Tournament to be played in spring 2021. The ACC was one of the only two conferences in men's soccer to play in the fall of 2020. The ACC also held a mini-season during the spring of 2021.

The Blue Devils finished the fall season 2–6–0 and 2–4–0 in ACC play to finish in fourth place in the South Division. In the ACC Tournament they lost to Pittsburgh in the Quarterfinals. They finished the spring season 2–4–3 and 2–3–1 in ACC play, to finish in third place in the Coastal Division. They were not invited to the NCAA Tournament.

== Player movement ==
=== Players leaving ===
Departures
Name	Number	Pos.	Height	Weight	Year	Hometown	Reason for Departure
Michael Reis	0	GK	6'2"	180	Senior	Claremont, CA	Graduated
Will Pulisic	1	GK	6'1"	180	Senior	Mechanicsville, VA	Graduated
Stephen O'Connell	2	DF	5'11"	170	Senior	Rye, NY	Graduated
Matthias Frick	3	DF	6'2"	195	Senior	Feldkirch, Austria	Graduated
Daniel Wright	7	FW	5'10"	140	Senior	Wixom, MI	Graduated
Jack Doran	8	MF	5'11"	180	Graduate Student	West Roxbury, MA	Graduated
Kristófer Garðarsson	10	MF	6'1"	175	Senior	Akranes, Iceland	Graduated
Micolas Macri	11	FW	6'1"	175	Senior	Buenos Aires, Argentina	Graduated
Kees Heetderks	16	DF	5'10"	170	Sophomore	Chapel Hill, NC	—
Sintayehu Clements	19	DF/FW	6'1"	180	Freshman	Seattle, WA	—
Adrian Vela	20	DF	6'0"	170	Senior	Richmond, TX	Graduated
Alex Slover	24	MF	5'11"	170	Sophomore	Westhampton, NY	—
Matthew Wolf	30	GK	6'1"	205	Freshman	Chapel Hill, NC	—

=== Players arriving ===
Duke signed seven players during the 2021 recruiting period.

Name	Nat.	Hometown	Club	TDS Rating
Felix Barajas; FW	USA	Los Angeles, CA	LA Galaxy (Academy)	3/5 stars
Jai Bean; FW	BER	Bermuda	Black Rock FC	3/5 stars
Sebastian Docters; DF	USA	Larchmont, NY	New York SC Academy	3/5 stars
Grant Farley; GK	USA	Baltimore, MD	Baltimore Armour	3/5 stars
Ruben Mesalles; MF	USA	Longboat, FL	IMG Academy	3/5 stars
Shak Mohammed; MF	GHA	Kumasi, Ghana	Black Rock FC	3/5 stars
Mateo Cornejo; MF	USA	Cary, NC	North Carolina	N/A

== Squad ==
=== Roster ===
As of February 9, 2022

Note: Flags indicate national team as defined under FIFA eligibility rules; some limited exceptions apply. Players may hold more than one non-FIFA nationality.

No.	Pos.	Nation	Player
0	GK	(United States) USA	Grant Farley
1	GK	(United States) USA	Eliot Hamill
2	MF	(United States) USA	Mateo Cornejo
4	DF	(Northern Ireland) NIR	Lewis McGarvey
5	MF	(United States) USA	Antino Lopez
6	MF	(United States) USA	Cameron Kerr
7	FW	(Iceland) ISL	Thorleifur Úlfarsson
8	MF	(United States) USA	Peter Stroud
9	FW	(United States) USA	Scotty Taylor
10	MF	(United States) USA	Nick Pariano
11	FW	(Bermuda) BER	Jai Bean
12	MF	(United States) USA	Ruben Mesalles
13	DF	(United States) USA	Ian Murphy
14	MF	(Ghana) GHA	Shak Mohammed

No.	Pos.	Nation	Player
15	FW	(United States) USA	Krew Verratti
16	MF	(United States) USA	Luke Thomas
17	MF	(Japan) JPN	Santa Ihara
19	MF	(United States) USA	Felix Barajas
20	MF	(United States) USA	Carl Fisher
21	MF	(United States) USA	Daniel Aguilar
22	MF	(United States) USA	Conor Kelly
23	GK	(United States) USA	JT Harms
24	MF	(United States) USA	Carter Cribbs
25	FW	(United States) USA	Miguel Ramirez
26	DF	(United States) USA	Amir Daley
28	MF	(United States) USA	Sebastian Docters
29	DF	(United States) USA	Nate Mulvaney

=== Team management ===
Position	Staff
Athletic Director	(United States) Kevin White
Head coach	(United States) John Kerr
Associate head coach	(England) Michael Brady
Assistant Coach	(United States) Kyle Renfro
Volunteer Assistant Coach	(United States) Tristan Wierbonski

== Schedule ==
Date Time, TV	Rank^{#}	Opponent^{#}	Result	Record	Site (Attendance) City, State
Exhibition
August 12*; 7:00 p.m.		at No. 25 Coastal Carolina	T 1–1	—	CCU Soccer Field; Conway, SC
August 14*; 7:00 p.m.		at UNC Wilmington	W 4–2	—	UNCW Soccer Stadium (701); Wilmington, NC
August 17*; 7:00 p.m.		at No. 24 High Point	W 2–0	—	Vert Stadium (265); High Point, NC
August 21*; 11:00 a.m.		NC State	L 1–3	—	Koskinen Stadium; Durham, NC
Regular season
August 27*; 7:30 p.m., ACCNX		Liberty	W 3–0	1–0–0	Koskinen Stadium (851); Durham, NC
August 29*; 2:30 p.m., ACCNX		Merrimack	W 4–0	2–0–0	Koskinen Stadium (262); Durham, NC
September 2*; 7:00 p.m., BTN+	No. 24	at Michigan	W 1–0	3–0–0	U-M Soccer Stadium (0); Ann Arbor, MI
September 6*; 7:00 p.m., ACCNX	No. 24	Seattle	L 0–1 ^{2OT}	3–1–0	Koskinen Stadium (503); Durham, NC
September 11; 7:00 p.m., ACCNX	No. 19	No. 6 Virginia Tech	W 1–0	4–1–0 (1–0–0)	Koskinen Stadium (863); Durham, NC
September 19; 7:00 p.m., ACCN	No. 12	at No. 16 North Carolina; Rivalry	W 3–0	5–1–0 (2–0–0)	Dorrance Field (2,310); Chapel Hill, NC
September 25; 7:00 p.m., ACCNX	No. 6	at Syracuse	W 1–0	6–1–0 (3–0–0)	SU Soccer Stadium (1,879); Syracuse, NY
September 28*; 7:00 p.m., ACCNX	No. 4	Howard	W 4–0	7–1–0	Koskinen Stadium (739); Durham, NC
October 1; 7:00 p.m., ACCNX	No. 4	No. 14 Louisville	W 3–1	8–1–0 (4–0–0)	Koskinen Stadium (1,017); Durham, NC
October 5*; 7:00 p.m., ACCNX	No. 3	Elon	W 3–1	9–1–0	Koskinen Stadium (520); Durham, NC
October 9; 7:00 p.m., ACCNX	No. 3	at No. 13 Pittsburgh	L 2–3	9–2–0 (4–1–0)	Ambrose Urbanic Field (1,409); Pittsburgh, PA
October 15; 7:00 p.m., ACCNX	No. 9	No. 23 Clemson	L 2–3 ^{OT}	9–3–0 (4–2–0)	Koskinen Stadium (1,204); Durham, NC
October 19*; 7:00 p.m., ESPN+	No. 18	at Furman	W 3–2	10–3–0	Stone Stadium (538); Greenville, SC
October 22; 7:00 p.m., ACCNX	No. 18	at No. 20 Notre Dame	T 1–1 ^{2OT}	10–3–1 (4–2–1)	Alumni Stadium (1,037); Notre Dame, IN
October 29; 7:00 p.m., ACCNX	No. 13	Virginia	W 3–2	11–3–1 (5–2–1)	Koskinen Stadium (1,117); Durham, NC
ACC Tournament
November 7; 2:00 pm, ACCN	(3) No. 13	(6) Wake Forest; Quarterfinal	W 3–2	12–3–1	Koskinen Stadium (1,062); Durham, NC
November 10; 7:00 pm, ACCN	(3) No. 11	at (2) No. 9 Clemson; Semifinal	W 1–0	13–3–1	Riggs Field (3,237); Clemson, SC
November 14; 2:00 pm, ESPNU	(3) No. 11	vs. (5) No. 20 Notre Dame; Final	L 0–2	13–4–1	WakeMed Soccer Park (2,737); Cary, NC
NCAA Tournament
November 21; 1:00 p.m., ACCNX	(7) No. 11	No. 22 UCLA; Second Round	W 2–1	14–4–1	Koskinen Stadium (626); Durham, NC
November 27; 7:00 p.m., ACCNX	(7) No. 11	(10) No. 8 Saint Louis; Third Round	L 3–4	14–5–1	Koskinen Stadium (714); Durham, NC
*Non-conference game. ^{#}Rankings from United Soccer Coaches. (#) Tournament seedings in parentheses. All times are in Eastern.

== Awards and honors ==
Recipient	Award	Date	Ref.
Peter Stroud	Preseason All-ACC Watchlist	August 18	
Eliot Hamill	ACC Defensive Player of the Week	September 7	
Eliot Hamill	ACC Defensive Player of the Week	September 21	
Eliot Hamill	ACC Defensive Player of the Week	September 28	
Thorleifur Úlfarsson	ACC Offensive Player of the Week	October 5	
Thorleifur Úlfarsson	ACC Offensive Player of the Year	November 10	
Peter Stroud	ACC Midfielder of the Year	November 10	
Shak Mohammed	ACC Freshman of the Year	November 10	
Thorleifur Úlfarsson	All-ACC First Team	November 10	
Shak Mohammed	All-ACC Second Team	November 10	
Ruben Mesalles	ACC All-Freshamn Team	November 10	
Shak Mohammed	ACC All-Freshamn Team	November 10	
Shak Mohammed	ACC All-Tournament Team	November 15	
Peter Stroud	ACC All-Tournament Team	November 15	
Thorleifur Úlfarsson	ACC All-Tournament Team	November 15	

== 2022 MLS Super Draft ==
Player	Team	Round	Pick #	Position
Thorleifur Úlfarsson	Houston Dynamo	1	4	FW
Ian Murphy	FC Cincinnati	1	14	DF

== Rankings ==
Ranking movements Legend: ██ Increase in ranking ██ Decrease in ranking — = Not ranked
	Week																
Poll	Pre	1	2	3	4	5	6	7	8	9	10	11	12	13	14	15	Final
United Soccer	—	24	19	12	6	4	3	9	18	13	13	11	Not released				12
TopDrawer Soccer	—	—	—	18	9	8	6	9	13	11	10	10	14	10	12	12	12
