= 2021 Virginia Tech Hokies men's soccer team =

American college soccer season

2021 Virginia Tech Hokies men's soccer

NCAA Tournament, Second Round
- Conference: Atlantic Coast Conference
- U. Soc. Coaches poll: No. 19
- Record: 11–5–4 (3–4–1 ACC)
- Head coach: Mike Brizendine (13th season)
- Assistant coaches: Patrick McSorley (12th season); James Lofton (1st season)
- Home stadium: Thompson Field

2021 ACC men's soccer standings
	Conf.					Overall
Team	W		L		T	W		L		T
Atlantic
No. 1 Clemson +	5	–	3	–	0	16	–	5	–	2
Louisville +	5	–	3	–	0	10	–	7	–	1
No. 17 Wake Forest +	4	–	3	–	1	13	–	7	–	1
Boston College	2	–	4	–	2	6	–	7	–	2
Syracuse	2	–	5	–	1	8	–	8	–	2
NC State	1	–	5	–	2	7	–	8	–	2
Coastal
No. 12 Duke +	5	–	2	–	1	14	–	5	–	1
No. 6 Pittsburgh +	5	–	2	–	1	13	–	5	–	2
No. 4 Notre Dame ‡	4	–	2	–	2	14	–	5	–	5
North Carolina +	4	–	4	–	0	11	–	7	–	2
No. 19 Virginia Tech +	3	–	4	–	1	11	–	5	–	4
Virginia	2	–	5	–	1	6	–	9	–	3
‡ – ACC Tournament champion + – Also invited to the 2021 NCAA tournament; As of December 14, 2021; Rankings from United Soccer Coaches; Source: The ACC

The 2021 Virginia Tech Hokies men's soccer team represented Virginia Tech during the 2021 NCAA Division I men's soccer season. It was the 50th season of the University fielding a program. The Hokies played their home games at Sandra D. Thompson Field in Blacksburg, Virginia. The Hokies were led by thirteenth-year head coach Mike Brizendine.

The Hokies finished the season 11–5–4 overall and 3–4–1 in ACC play to finish fifth in the Coastal Division. As the eighth overall seed in the ACC Tournament, they defeated ninth seed Boston College in the first round before losing to top seeded Pittsburgh in the quarterfinals. They received an at-large bid to the NCAA Tournament. They defeated Campbell in the first round before losing to West Virginia in a penalty shoot-out to end their season.

== Previous season ==
The teams' 2020 season was significantly impacted by the COVID-19 pandemic, which curtailed the fall season and caused the NCAA Tournament to be played in spring 2021. The ACC was one of the only two conferences in men's soccer to play in the fall of 2020. The ACC also held a mini-season during the spring of 2021.

The Hokies finished the fall season 3–2–2 and 3–1–2 in ACC play to finish in second place in the North Division. In the ACC Tournament they lost to Clemson in the quarterfinals. They finished the spring season 4–4–2 and 2–4–0 in ACC play, to finish in fifth place in the Coastal Division. They received an at-large bid to the NCAA Tournament. They defeated Oregon State in the second round before losing to the number six seed Seton Hall in the third round to end their season.

In the 2021 MLS SuperDraft, the Hokies had two players drafted:Daniel Periera and Kristofer Strickler.

== Player movement ==
=== Players leaving ===
Departures
Name	Number	Pos.	Height	Year	Hometown	Reason for departure
Mathijs Swaneveld	1	GK	6'4"	Senior	Schoonhoven, Netherlands	Graduated
Oreyem Kilama	7	FW		Sophomore	Wilmington, DE	—
Daniel Pereira	9	MF	5'9"	Sophomore	Roanoke, VA	Drafted 1st overall in the 2021 MLS SuperDraft by Austin FC
Kristo Strickler	15	MF	5'10"	Senior	Hilliard, OH	Graduated; Drafted 30th overall in the 2021 MLS SuperDraft by the Houston Dynamo
Birkir Eythórsson	16	MF	6'0"	Freshman	Reykjavík, Iceland	Signed professional contract with Fylkir
Hayden Kickbush	27	GK	6'2"	(redshirt) Junior	Arlington, VA	Graduated
Alex Adjetey	30	FW	5'7"	Sophomore	Accra, Ghana	—
Jakob Bluemler	31	GK	5'10"	Senior	Frankfurt, Germany	Graduated

=== Players arriving ===
Name	Nat.	Hometown	Club	TDS Rating
Carsten Bay; DF	USA	Chesapeake, VA	Beach FC	2/5 stars
Jordan Black; DF	USA	Woodbridge, VA	Loudoun Soccer Club	2/5 stars
Danny Flores; DF	USA	Faribault, MN	Philadelphia Union	4/5 stars
Ethan Fraser; FW	USA	Leesburg, VA	Loudoun Soccer Club	2/5 stars
Carter Hensley; MF	USA	Charlotte, NC	Charlotte Soccer Academy	2/5 stars
Ben Martino; GK	USA	Pittsburgh, PA	Philadelphia Union	4/5 stars
James Declan Quill; FW	USA	Falls Church, VA	Braddock Road YC	3/5 stars
Chris Thompson; DF	USA	Woodbridge, VA	Loudoun Soccer Club	2/5 stars

== Squad ==
=== Roster ===
As of February 2, 2022

Note: Flags indicate national team as defined under FIFA eligibility rules; some limited exceptions apply. Players may hold more than one non-FIFA nationality.

No.	Pos.	Nation	Player
0	GK	USA	Connor Jordan-Hyde
1	GK	USA	Ben Martino
2	DF	USA	Jack Dearie
3	DF	NOR	Sivert Haugli
4	MF	USA	Kyle Stenzel
5	DF	BRA	Welnilton da Silva
6	MF	AUS	Camron Joice
7	FW	USA	Declan Quill
8	MF	GHA	Mayola Kinyua
9	FW	ESP	Pol Monells
10	MF	USA	Chris Little
11	FW	USA	Daniel Starr
12	MF	USA	Andrew Weber
13	MF	USA	Carter Hensley
14	FW	USA	Kahlil Dover
15	FW	USA	Ethan Fraser
16	MF	IRL	Conor Pugh

No.	Pos.	Nation	Player
17	FW	USA	Nick Backlock
18	FW	USA	Jacob Labovitz
20	MF	USA	Landon Ameres
21	MF	USA	Camron Lennon
22	DF	USA	Mason McClendon
23	MF	USA	Danny Flores
24	MF	ENG	Kyle McDowell
25	GK	USA	Matt Zambetti
26	DF	USA	Chris Nicola
27	GK	USA	Timi Adams
28	DF	USA	Zane Bubb
29	DF	USA	Chris Thompson
30	MF	USA	Tyler Taber
31	DF	CAN	Joel Opoku
32	DF	USA	Carsten Bay
33	DF	USA	Jordan Black

=== Team management ===
Position	Staff
Athletic Director	Whit Babcock
Head coach	Mike Brizendine
Assistant Coach	Patrick McSorley
Assistant Coach	James Lofton

== Schedule ==
Date Time, TV	Rank^{#}	Opponent^{#}	Result	Record	Site (Attendance) City, State
Exhibition
August 13*; 7:00 p.m.	No. 15	No. 18 Charlotte	L 0–1	–	Thompson Field; Blacksburg, VA
August 17*; 7:00 p.m.	No. 15	NC State	L 0–2	–	Thompson Field; Blacksburg, VA
August 21*; 1:00 p.m.	No. 15	at No. 5 Georgetown		–	Shaw Field; Washington, D.C.
Regular season
August 26*; 5:00 p.m.	No. 15	vs. Kansas City; JMU Invitational	T 2–2 ^{2OT}	0–0–1	Sentara Park (0); Harrisonburg, VA
August 29*; 3:30 p.m.	No. 15	vs. No. 1 Marshall; JMU Invitational	W 3–2	1–0–1	Sentara Park (113); Harrisonburg, VA
September 3*; 4:00 p.m.	No. 10	vs. UCF; George Tarantini Classic	W 2–1	2–0–1	Dail Soccer Field (50); Raleigh, NC
September 6*; 1:00 p.m.	No. 10	vs. No. 20 Seton Hall; George Tarantini Classic	T 3–3 ^{2OT}	2–0–2	Dail Soccer Field (116); Raleigh, NC
September 11; 7:00 p.m., ACCNX	No. 6	at No. 19 Duke	L 0–1	2–1–2 (0–1–0)	Koskinen Stadium (863); Durham, NC
September 17; 7:00 p.m., ACCN	No. 17	Virginia; Commonwealth Clash	W 2–1 ^{2OT}	3–1–2 (1–1–0)	Thompson Field (2,725); Blacksburg, VA
September 21*; 7:00 p.m.	No. 12	at William & Mary	W 3–2	4–1–2	Albert–Daly Field (1,129); Williamsburg, VA
September 24; 7:00 p.m.	No. 12	Notre Dame	W 2–1 ^{OT}	5–1–2 (2–1–0)	Thompson Field (1,423); Blacksburg, VA
September 28*; 7:00 p.m.	No. 11	East Tennessee State	W 2–0	6–1–2	Thompson Field (511); Blacksburg, VA
October 1; 7:00 p.m.	No. 11	at Boston College	T 0–0 ^{2OT}	6–1–3 (2–1–1)	Newton Soccer Complex (1,956); Chestnut Hill, MA
October 8; 6:00 p.m., ACCRSN	No. 9	No. 23 Louisville	W 4–2	7–1–3 (3–1–1)	Thompson Field (765); Blacksburg, VA
October 12*; 7:00 p.m., ACCN	No. 5	Davidson	W 4–0	8–1–3	Thompson Field (435); Blacksburg, VA
October 16; 7:00 p.m.	No. 5	at Wake Forest	L 1–3	8–2–3 (3–2–1)	Spry Stadium (3,026); Winston–Salem, NC
October 20*; 6:00 p.m., ACCNX	No. 13	Winthrop	W 3–0	9–2–3	Thompson Field (551); Blacksburg, VA
October 24; 7:00 p.m., ACCRSN	No. 13	North Carolina	L 0–2	9–3–3 (3–3–1)	Thompson Field (1,115); Blacksburg, VA
October 29; 7:00 p.m., ACCNX	No. 21	at No. 12 Pittsburgh	L 1–4	9–4–3 (3–4–1)	Ambrose Urbanic Field (900); Pittsburgh, PA
ACC tournament
November 3; 7:00 p.m., ACCNX	(8)	(9) Boston College; First Round	W 1–0 ^{OT}	10–4–3	Thompson Field (1,535); Blacksburg, VA
November 7; 4:00 p.m., ACCN	(8)	at (1) No. 6 Pittsburgh; Quarterfinals	L 1–2 ^{2OT}	10–5–3	Ambrose Urbanic Field (1,443); Pittsburgh, PA
NCAA tournament
November 18; 6:00 p.m., ACCNX		Campbell; First Round	W 2–1	11–5–3	Thompson Field (369); Blacksburg, VA
November 21; 1:00 p.m.		(11) No. 21 West Virginia; Second Round	T 1–1 (3–4 PKs) ^{2OT}	11–5–4	Dick Dlesk Soccer Stadium (1,017); Morgantown, WV
*Non-conference game. ^{#}Rankings from United Soccer Coaches. (#) Tournament seedings in parentheses. All times are in Eastern.

== Honors and awards ==
Recipient	Award	Date	Ref.
Sivert Haugli	Preseason All-ACC Watchlist	August 18, 2021	
Jacob Labovitz	ACC Offensive Player of the Week	September 21, 2021	
Danny Flores	ACC Co-Offensive Player of the Week	September 28, 2021	
Jacob Labovitz	All-ACC First Team	November 10	
Mayola Kinyua	All-ACC Third Team	November 10	
Danny Flores	ACC All-Freshman Team	November 10	

== Rankings ==
Ranking movements Legend: ██ Increase in ranking ██ Decrease in ranking — = Not ranked RV = Received votes
	Week																
Poll	Pre	1	2	3	4	5	6	7	8	9	10	11	12	13	14	15	Final
United Soccer	15	10	6	17	12	11	9	5	13	21	RV	RV	Not released				19
TopDrawer Soccer	19	18	18	—	—	—	—	21	21	25	—	—	—	—	—	—	—

== 2022 MLS SuperDraft ==
Player	Team	Round	Pick #	Position
Sivert Haugli	Portland Timbers	3	83	DF
