= 2021 Pittsburgh Panthers men's soccer team =

American college soccer season

2021 Pittsburgh Panthers men's soccer

ACC Coastal Division Regular Season Champions

NCAA Tournament, Quarterfinals
- Conference: Atlantic Coast Conference
- U. Soc. Coaches poll: No. 6
- TopDrawerSoccer.com: No. 8
- Record: 13–5–2 (5–2–1 ACC)
- Head coach: Jay Vidovich (6th season)
- Assistant coaches: Michael Behonick (6th season); Rich Costanzo (5th season)
- Home stadium: Ambrose Urbanic Field

2021 ACC men's soccer standings
	Conf.					Overall
Team	W		L		T	W		L		T
Atlantic
No. 1 Clemson +	5	–	3	–	0	16	–	5	–	2
Louisville +	5	–	3	–	0	10	–	7	–	1
No. 17 Wake Forest +	4	–	3	–	1	13	–	7	–	1
Boston College	2	–	4	–	2	6	–	7	–	2
Syracuse	2	–	5	–	1	8	–	8	–	2
NC State	1	–	5	–	2	7	–	8	–	2
Coastal
No. 12 Duke +	5	–	2	–	1	14	–	5	–	1
No. 6 Pittsburgh +	5	–	2	–	1	13	–	5	–	2
No. 4 Notre Dame ‡	4	–	2	–	2	14	–	5	–	5
North Carolina +	4	–	4	–	0	11	–	7	–	2
No. 19 Virginia Tech +	3	–	4	–	1	11	–	5	–	4
Virginia	2	–	5	–	1	6	–	9	–	3
‡ – ACC Tournament champion + – Also invited to the 2021 NCAA tournament; As of December 14, 2021; Rankings from United Soccer Coaches; Source: The ACC

The 2021 Pittsburgh Panthers men's soccer team represented the University of Pittsburgh during the 2021 NCAA Division I men's soccer season. The Panthers were led by head coach Jay Vidovich, in his sixth season. They played home games at Ambrose Urbanic Field. This was the team's 68th season playing organized men's college soccer and their 9th playing in the Atlantic Coast Conference.

The Panthers finished the season 13–5–2 overall and 5–2–1 in ACC play to finish in a tie for first place in the Coastal Division. They won a tiebreaker with Duke to be awarded the first overall seed in the ACC Tournament. They earned a bye into the Quarterfinals where they defeated Virginia Tech before losing to eventual champions Notre Dame in the Semifinals. They received an at-large bid to the NCAA Tournament and were awarded the fifth overall seed. After a First Round bye, they defeated Northern Illinois in the Second Round and Hofstra in the Third Round before losing to Notre Dame on penalties to end their season.

== Background ==
The teams' 2020 season was significantly impacted by the COVID-19 pandemic, which curtailed the fall season and caused the NCAA Tournament to be played in spring 2021. The ACC was one of the only two conferences in men's soccer to play in the fall of 2020. The ACC also held a mini-season during the spring of 2021.

The Panthers finished the fall season 7–1–0 and 4–0–0 in ACC play to finish in first place in the North Division. In the ACC Tournament they defeated Duke in the Quarterfinals and Notre Dame in the Semifinals before losing to Clemson in the Final. They finished the spring season 6–1–0 and 5–1–0 in ACC play, to finish in first place in the Coastal Division. They received an at-large bid to the NCAA Tournament because they lost the automatic bid play-in game to Clemson. As the second seed in the tournament, they defeated Monmouth in the Second Round, UCF in the Third Round, and Washington in the Quarterfinals before losing to Indiana in the Semifinals to end their season.

At the end of the season, one Panthers men's soccer player was selected in the 2021 MLS SuperDraft: Edward Kizza.

== Player movement ==
=== Players leaving ===
Departures
Name	Number	Pos.	Height	Weight	Year	Hometown	Reason for departure
Alexander Steinbach	1	GK	5'11"	168	(redshirt) Sophomore	Frankfurt, Germany	—
Bryce Washington	4	DF	6'2"	163	Senior	Atlanta, GA	Graduated
Anass Amrani	6	MF	5'8"	153	Sophomore	Rabat, Morocco	—
Luis Lara	7	FW	5'9"	167	Freshman	Mexico City, Mexico	Transferred to Stetson
Sebastian Serpa	22	DF	5'8"	158	(redshirt) Freshman	Miami Beach, FL	—
Vinicius Belon	23	DF	5'7"	145	Freshman	Curitiba, Brazil	—
Dominic Reiter	26	DF	6'0"	175	Freshman	Sewickley, PA	—
Nathan Stricker	28	MF	5'5"	140	Freshman	Sinking Spring, PA	—

=== Players arriving ===
Name	Nat.	Hometown	Club	TDS Rating
Luis Shamkow; FW	USA	Plano, TX	Solar Soccer Club	3/5 stars

== Squad ==
=== Roster ===
As of February 9, 2022

Note: Flags indicate national team as defined under FIFA eligibility rules; some limited exceptions apply. Players may hold more than one non-FIFA nationality.

No.	Pos.	Nation	Player
0	GK	ESP	Nico Campuzano
1	GK	NED	Joe Van der Sar
2	DF	GER	Jasper Löeffelsend
3	DF	FRA	Raphaël Crivello
4	DF	JOR	Mohammad Abualnadi
5	DF	ESP	Arturo Ordoñez
6	MF	BRA	Lucas Rosa
7	MF	BRA	Guilherme Feitosa
8	MF	FRA	Valentin Noël
10	FW	FRA	Bertin Jacquesson
11	MF	BRA	Rodrigo Almeida
13	FW	USA	Alexander Dexter
14	DF	ESP	Sito Sena

No.	Pos.	Nation	Player
15	FW	USA	Luke Mort
17	FW	USA	Luis Sahmkow
18	MF	JPN	Soshun Shigaki
19	MF	SRB	Veljko Petkovic
20	MF	USA	Matt Bailey
21	MF	SRB	Filip Mirkovic
22	DF	USA	Max Brown
23	FW	USA	Cade Hagan
24	MF	SUI	Jackson Walti
26	MF	USA	Michael Sullivan
27	DF	USA	Anthony Harding
28	MF	ENG	Louis Spicer
32	GK	USA	Andrew Noel

=== Team management ===
Position	Staff
Athletic Director	Heather Lyke
Head coach	Jay Vidovich
Assistant Coach	Michael Behonick
Assistant Coach	Rich Costanzo

== Schedule ==
Date Time, TV	Rank^{#}	Opponent^{#}	Result	Record	Site (Attendance) City, State
Exhibition
August 14*; 7:00 p.m.	No. 3	Robert Morris	W 4–0	—	Ambrose Urbanic Field; Pittsburgh, PA
August 21*; 7:30 p.m.	No. 3	at Maryland	L 1–2	—	Ludwig Field; College Park, MD
Regular season
August 26*; 8:00 p.m., ACCN	No. 3	Duquesne	W 7–0	1–0–0	Ambrose Urbanic Field (1,310); Pittsburgh, PA
August 30*; 7:00 p.m., ESPN+	No. 3	at West Virginia	L 1–2	1–1–0	Dick Dlesk Soccer Stadium (1,316); Morgantown, WV
September 3*; 7:00 p.m., ACCNX	No. 3	Lehigh	W 2–1	2–1–0	Ambrose Urbanic Field (1,060); Pittsburgh, PA
September 6*; 7:00 p.m., ESPN+	No. 3	at No. 19 Akron	L 1–2	2–2–0	FirstEnergy Stadium (1,955); Akron, OH
September 10; 7:00 p.m., ACCNX	No. 15	No. 4 North Carolina	W 4–0	3–2–0 (1–0–0)	Ambrose Urbanic Field (1,115); Pittsburgh, PA
September 13*; 7:00 p.m., FS1	No. 15	at Penn State	W 1–0	4–2–0	Jeffrey Field (1,518); State College, PA
September 17; 8:00 p.m., ACCNX	No. 5	at Wake Forest	L 1–3	4–3–0 (1–1–0)	Spry Stadium (2,176); Winston–Salem, NC
September 25; 7:00 p.m., ACCNX	No. 15	at No. 2 Clemson	W 2–0	5–3–0 (2–1–0)	Riggs Field (2,231); Clemson, SC
October 1; 7:00 p.m., ACCNX	No. 16	Syracuse	W 3–2 ^{2OT}	6–3–0 (3–1–0)	Ambrose Urbanic Field (1,097); Pittsburgh, PA
October 5*; 7:00 p.m., ACCNX	No. 13	Cleveland State	W 4–0	7–3–0	Ambrose Urbanic Field (430); Pittsburgh, PA
October 9; 7:00 p.m., ACCNX	No. 13	No. 3 Duke	W 3–2	8–3–0 (4–1–0)	Ambrose Urbanic Field (1,409); Pittsburgh, PA
October 16; 7:00 p.m., ACCNX	No. 7	at Notre Dame	L 0–1 ^{2OT}	8–4–0 (4–2–0)	Alumni Stadium (385); Notre Dame, IN
October 22; 7:00 p.m., ACCNX	No. 10	at Virginia	T 2–2 ^{2OT}	8–4–1 (4–2–1)	Klöckner Stadium (0); Charlottesville, VA
October 25*; 7:00 p.m., ACCNX	No. 10	Massachusetts	W 5–1	9–4–1	Ambrose Urbanic Field (713); Pittsburgh, PA
October 29; 7:00 p.m., ACCNX	No. 12	No. 21 Virginia Tech	W 4–1	10–4–1 (5–2–1)	Ambrose Urbanic Field (900); Pittsburgh, PA
ACC tournament
November 7; 4:00 p.m., ACCN	(1) No. 6	(8) Virginia Tech; Quarterfinals	W 2–1 ^{2OT}	11–4–1	Ambrose Urbanic Field (1,443); Pittsburgh, PA
November 10; 5:00 p.m., ACCN	(1) No. 5	(5) No. 20 Notre Dame; Semifinals	L 0–2	11–5–1	Ambrose Urbanic Field (1,626); Pittsburgh, PA
NCAA tournament
November 21; 4:00 p.m.	(5) No. 5	No. 19 Northern Illinois; Second Round	W 5–2	12–5–1	Ambrose Urbanic Field (881); Pittsburgh, PA
November 27; 4:00 p.m.	(5) No. 5	No. 13 Hofstra; Third Round	W 4–0	13–5–1	Ambrose Urbanic Field (1,079); Pittsburgh, PA
December 4; 5:00 p.m.	(5) No. 5	(4) No. 20 Notre Dame; Quarterfinals	T 1–1 (2–4 PKs)	13–5–2	Alumni Stadium (1,303); Notre Dame, IN
*Non-conference game. ^{#}Rankings from United Soccer Coaches. (#) Tournament seedings in parentheses. All times are in Eastern.

== Awards and honors ==
Recipient	Award	Date	Ref.
Valentin Noël	Preseason All-ACC Watchlist	August 18, 2021	
Jasper Löeffelsend	Preseason Hermann Trophy Watchlist	August 26, 2021	
Valentin Noel	Preseason Hermann Trophy Watchlist	August 26, 2021	
Veljko Petkovic	ACC Offensive Player of the Week	August 31, 2021	
Matt Bailey	ACC Co-Offensive Player of the Week	September 28, 2021	
Guilherme Feitosa	Co-Offensive Player of the Week	October 13, 2021	
Jay Vidovich	ACC Coach of the Year	November 10	
Jasper Löeffelsend	ACC Defensive Player of the Year	November 10	
Jasper Löeffelsend	All-ACC First Team	November 10	
Rodrigo Almeida	All-ACC Second Team	November 10	
Bertin Jacquesson	All-ACC Second Team	November 10	
Valentin Noel	All-ACC Second Team	November 10	
Arturo Ordoñez	All-ACC Second Team	November 10	
Veljko Petkovic	All-ACC Second Team	November 10	
Jackson Walti	All-ACC Second Team	November 10	
Nico Campuzano	All-ACC Third Team	November 10	
Guiherme Feitosa	ACC All-Freshman Team	November 10	
Valentin Noel	ACC All-Tournament Team	November 15	
Arturo Ordoñez	ACC All-Tournament Team	November 15	

== Rankings ==
Ranking movements Legend: ██ Increase in ranking ██ Decrease in ranking ( ) = First-place votes
	Week																
Poll	Pre	1	2	3	4	5	6	7	8	9	10	11	12	13	14	15	Final
United Soccer	3 (1)	3 (3)	15	5	15	16	13	7	10	12	6	5 (2)	Not released				6
TopDrawer Soccer	3	2	6	11	22	21	22	8	12	16	14	12	15	12	7	8	8

== 2022 MLS Super Draft ==
Player	Team	Round	Pick #	Position
Arturo Ordoñez	Houston Dynamo	2	39	DF
Jasper Löeffelsend	Real Salt Lake	3	81	DF
