= Gavin Krenecki =

American soccer player

Personal information
- Full name: Gavin Krenecki
- Date of birth: March 8, 2003 (age 23)
- Place of birth: Sacramento, California, United States
- Height: 5 ft 11 in (1.80 m)
- Position: Goalkeeper

Team information
- Current team: Louisville Cardinals
- Number: 1

Youth career
- 2016–2019: Sacramento Republic
- 2019–2020: Sporting Kansas City

College career
Years	Team	Apps	(Gls)
2021–2023	Louisville Cardinals	3	(0)
2024–	Dayton		

Senior career*
Years	Team	Apps	(Gls)
2020–2021	Sporting Kansas City II	4	(0)
- * Club domestic league appearances and goals as of October 6, 2021

Gavin Krenecki (born March 8, 2003) is an American professional soccer player who plays as a goalkeeper for Dayton Flyers.

== Club career ==
=== Youth ===
Born in Sacramento, California, Krenecki began his career at the Sacramento Republic youth academy before joining the Sporting Kansas City academy in 2019. He was signed to a short USL Academy contract with Sporting Kansas City's reserve side Swope Park Rangers in late 2019 but did not make an appearance. Krenecki was then signed again to a USL Academy contract with the then rebranded Sporting Kansas City II in the USL Championship on August 13, 2020.

Krenecki made his professional debut for Sporting Kansas City II on August 15, 2020, against Saint Louis FC. He started in goal as Sporting Kansas City II were defeated 3–1.

=== College ===
In the fall of 2021, Krenecki began playing college soccer at the University of Louisville.

== Career statistics ==
=== Club ===
As of match played August 15, 2020

Appearances and goals by club, season and competition
Club	Season	League			Cup		Continental		Total	
Club	Season	Division	Apps	Goals	Apps	Goals	Apps	Goals	Apps	Goals
Sporting Kansas City II	2020	USL Championship	1	0	—	—	—	—	1	0
Career total			1	0	0	0	0	0	1	0
