= 2021 NCAA Division I men's soccer rankings =

- Season: 2021
- NCAA tournament: 2021
- Preseason No. 1: Marshall
- NCAA Tournament Champions: Clemson
NCAA Division I men's soccer rankings


Two major human polls make up the 2021 NCAA Division I men's soccer rankings: United Soccer Coaches and Top Drawer Soccer.

== Legend ==
	Increase in ranking
	Decrease in ranking
	New to rankings from previous week
Italics	Number of first place votes
(#–#)	Win–loss record
т	Tied with team above or below also with this symbol

== United Soccer Coaches ==
	Preseason Aug 4	Week 1 Aug 31	Week 2 Sep 7	Week 3 Sep 14	Week 4 Sep 21	Week 5 Sep 28	Week 6 Oct 5	Week 7 Oct 12	Week 8 Oct 19	Week 9 Oct 26	Week 10 Nov 2	Week 11 Nov 9	Final Dec 14	
1.	Marshall (22)	Indiana (1–0–0) (20)	Georgetown (3–0–0) (15)	Georgetown (5–0–1) (19)	Georgetown (6–0–0) (19)	Georgetown (7–0–0) (22)	Georgetown (8–0–0) (21)	Georgetown (10–0–0) (22)	Washington (12–0–1) (15)	Georgetown (13–1–0) (14)	Marshall (11–1–3) (15)	Oregon State (12–2–2) (7)	Clemson (16–5–2) (24)	1.
2.	Indiana	Georgetown (2–0–0)	Clemson (3–0–0) (6)	Clemson (6–0–1) (5)	Clemson (7–0–0) (4)	Washington (7–0–0) (1)	Washington (9–0–0) (3)	Washington (11–0–0) (2)	Georgetown (11–1–0) (6)	Marshall (10–1–3) (4)	Oregon State (11–1–2) (6)	Tulsa (13–1–1) (5)	Washington (18–2–2)	2.
3.	Pittsburgh (1)	Pittsburgh (1–0–0) (3)	Washington (3–0–0) (3)	Washington (5–0–0) (1)	Washington (6–0–0) (1)	West Virginia (6–0–2) (1)	Duke (8–1–0)	Marshall (7–1–3)	Marshall (8–1–3) (1)	Oregon State (9–1–2) (4)	Washington (12–1–1) (1)	Washington (14–1–1) (5)	Georgetown (18–3–1)	3.
4.	North Carolina	Clemson (2–0–0) (1)	North Carolina (2–0–1)	West Virginia (4–0–1)	West Virginia (4–0–2)	Duke (6–1–0)	West Virginia (6–0–3)	New Hampshire (12–0–0)	Kentucky (8–0–3) (2)	Washington (12–1–1) (2)	Georgetown (13–2–0) (2)	Marshall (11–2–3) (2)	Notre Dame (14–5–5)	4.
5.	Georgetown	Washington (2–0–0)	West Virginia (3–0–0)	Pittsburgh (5–2–0)	Marshall (3–1–2)	Marshall (4–1–3)	Marshall (6–1–3)	Virginia Tech (7–1–3)	New Hampshire (12–0–2)	Kentucky (9–0–4)	Tulsa (12–1–1)	Pittsburgh (11–4–1) (2)	Oregon State (14–2–4)	5.
6.	Clemson (1)	North Carolina (1–0–1)	Virginia Tech (2–0–1)	Marshall (3–1–1)	Duke (5–1–0)	New Hampshire (9–0–0)	Tulsa (9–0–0)	Kentucky (7–0–3)	Clemson (10–3–0)	New Hampshire (13–0–2)	Pittsburgh (10–4–1)	New Hampshire (15–0–2) (2)	Pittsburgh (13–5–2)	6.
7.	Wake Forest	Marshall (1–1–0)	Maryland (3–0–0)	Akron (4–0–1)	Maryland (6–1–0)	Tulsa (7–0–0)	New Hampshire (11–0–0)	Pittsburgh (8–3–0)	Maryland (10–2–1)	Maryland (11–2–1)	New Hampshire (14–0–2)	Georgetown (14–2–0)	Saint Louis (16–1–4)	7.
8.	Stanford	Missouri State (2–0–0)	SMU (2–0–1)	Maryland (4–1–0)	Tulsa (6–0–0)	Maryland (7–1–0)	Kentucky (7–0–2)	Tulsa (9–1–0)	Oregon State (8–1–2)	Tulsa (11–1–0)	Saint Louis (14–0–3)	Saint Louis (15–0–3)	West Virginia (12–3–6)	8.
9.	Washington	SMU (1–0–0)	Indiana (2–1–0)	New Hampshire (5–0–0)	New Hampshire (7–0–0)	Loyola Marymount (9–0–1)	Virginia Tech (6–1–3)	Duke (9–2–0)	Missouri State (11–1–0)	Missouri State (12–1–0)	Clemson (12–4–0)	Clemson (13–4–0)	New Hampshire (17–2–2)	9.
10.	Seton Hall	Virginia Tech (1–0–1)	Marshall (1–1–1)	Tulsa (5–0–0)	Kentucky (5–0–1)	Kentucky (5–0–2)	SMU (6–1–2)	Missouri State (9–1–0)	Pittsburgh (8–4–0)	Saint Louis (13–0–3)	Maryland (12–3–1)	Missouri State (15–1–0) (1)	Tulsa (16–2–1)	10.
11.	Penn State	Maryland (2–0–0)	Loyola Marymount (3–0–1)	Indiana (4–1–1)	Loyola Marymount (8–0–1)	Virginia Tech (5–1–2)	Missouri State (8–1–0)	Saint Louis (10–0–3)	Tulsa (10–1–0)	Notre Dame (9–4–2)	Missouri State (14–1–0)	Duke (12–3–1)	Kentucky (15–2–4)	11.
12.	Missouri State	VCU (1–0–1)	New Hampshire (3–0–0)	Duke (6–1–1)	Virginia Tech (3–1–2)	SMU (5–0–2)	Maryland (7–2–1)	Maryland (8–2–1)	Saint Louis (12–0–3)	Pittsburgh (9–4–1)	Kentucky (10–1–4)	Maryland (12–3–2)	Duke (14–5–1)	12.
13.	UCF	Marquette (2–0–0)	FIU (3–0–0)	FIU (4–0–1)	SMU (4–0–2)	San Diego State (6–0–2)	Pittsburgh (6–3–0)	Oregon State (7–1–2)	Virginia Tech (8–2–3)	Duke (10–3–1)	Duke (11–3–1)	Hofstra (15–1–2)	Hofstra (18–2–2)	13.
14.	Kentucky	New Hampshire (2–0–0)	Oregon State (3–0–0)	Kentucky (4–0–1)	San Diego State (5–0–2)	Louisville (6–2–0)	Saint Louis (7–0–3)	Loyola Marymount (10–1–1)	Bowling Green (9–2–2)	Hofstra (14–1–1)	Hofstra (15–1–1)	FIU (12–2–2)	Indiana (15–6–1)	14.
15.	Virginia Tech	Loyola Marymount (1–0–0)	Pittsburgh (2–1–0)	Loyola Marymount (6–0–1)	Pittsburgh (4–3–0)	Saint Louis (5–0–3)	Oregon State (6–1–1)	James Madison (10–2–0)	Loyola Marymount (10–2–1)	Clemson (10–4–0)	NIU (12–1–2)	Kentucky (11–1–4)	Marshall (11–4–3)	15.
16.	Oregon State	Saint Louis (2–0–0)	Akron (3–0–0)	North Carolina (3–2–1)	Saint Louis (4–0–3)	Pittsburgh (5–3–0)	Loyola Marymount (9–1–1)	UNC Greensboro (9–2–1)	Providence (8–2–3)	NIU (11–1–2)	Providence (9–2–4)	Santa Clara (11–1–3)	Providence (12–5–4)	16.
17.	Loyola Marymount	Penn State (1–0–1)	Kentucky (2–0–1)	Virginia Tech (2–1–3)	Bowling Green (5–1–1)	Bowling Green (7–1–1)	Grand Canyon (8–1–0)	Bowling Green (9–2–1)	FIU (8–1–2)	FIU (10–1–2)	Grand Canyon (14–2–0)	Indiana (13–4–1)	Wake Forest (13–7–1)	17.
18.	Charlotte	Wake Forest (1–1–0)	Marquette (3–0–0)	SMU (3–0–2)	Lipscomb (5–0–2)	Missouri State (6–1–0)	James Madison (8–2–0)	FIU (7–1–2)	Duke (9–3–0)	Providence (9–2–3)	North Carolina (10–5–1)	Providence (9–3–4)	FIU (12–4–2)	18.
19.	Marquette	Akron (1–0–0)	Duke (3–0–0)	Seton Hall (3–0–2)	Grand Canyon (5–1–0)	Clemson (7–2–0)	UNC Greensboro (8–2–1)	Cornell (7–1–1)	Hofstra (12–1–1)	Akron (8–3–3)	FIU (11–2–2)	NIU (12–2–2)	Virginia Tech (11–5–4)	19.
20.	New Hampshire	Seton Hall (0–0–1)	Stanford (1–1–0)	Oregon State (4–1–0)	Akron (4–1–1)	Grand Canyon (6–1–0)	FIU (7–1–1)	Providence (7–1–3)	Notre Dame (8–4–1)	Cornell (10–2–1)	Santa Clara (10–1–3)	Notre Dame (10–5–3)	Santa Clara (12–2–4)	20.
21.	James Madison	Kentucky (0–0–1)	Lipscomb (3–0–0)	San Diego State (3–0–2)	Rutgers (7–0–1)	FIU (6–1–1)	Clemson (8–2–0)	West Virginia (6–1–4)	NIU (10–1–1)	Virginia Tech (9–3–3)	Akron (9–4–3)	West Virginia (11–2–4)	NIU (15–3–2)	21.
22.	Grand Canyon	Oregon State (1–0–0)	Seton Hall (2–0–2)	Lipscomb (4–0–1)	Santa Clara (6–1–0)	Providence (6–1–1)	Rutgers (7–1–2)	NIU (10–1–0)	UCLA (8–4–0)	Indiana (11–3–1)	Indiana (12–4–1)	UCLA (9–6–1)	Missouri State (17–2–0)	22.
23.	Fordham	Lipscomb (2–0–0)	Saint Louis (2–0–1)	Stanford (2–1–2)	FIU (4–1–1)	UCLA (6–2–0)	Louisville (7–3–0)	Clemson (9–3–0)	James Madison (10–3–0)	UCLA (8–5–1)	Notre Dame (9–5–2)	North Carolina (11–6–1)	Maryland (12–4–2)	23.
24.	High Point	Duke (2–0–0)	Tulsa (3–0–0)	Saint Louis (4–0–2)	Providence (4–1–1)	Rutgers (7–1–1)	Cornell (6–1–1)	SMU (6–2–2)	Cornell (8–2–1)	Santa Clara (8–1–3)	St. John's (10–4–2)	Penn State (11–6–1)	Penn State (13–7–1)	24.
25.	Coastal Carolina	Stanford (0–1–0)	Wake Forest (2–1–0)	Grand Canyon (4–1–0)	Louisville (4–2–0)	Santa Clara (6–1–1)	Providence (6–1–2)	Grand Canyon (10–1–0)	West Virginia (7–1–4)	Grand Canyon (12–2–0)	UNC Greensboro (13–3–1)	Grand Canyon (14–3–0)	UCLA (11–7–1)	25.
	Preseason Aug 4	Week 1 Aug 31	Week 2 Sep 7	Week 3 Sep 14	Week 4 Sep 21	Week 5 Sep 28	Week 6 Oct 5	Week 7 Oct 12	Week 8 Oct 19	Week 9 Oct 26	Week 10 Nov 2	Week 11 Nov 9	Final Dec 14	
		Dropped: No. 13 UCF; No. 18 Charlotte; No. 21 James Madison; No. 22 Grand Canyon; No. 23 Fordham; No. 24 High Point; No. 25 Coastal Carolina	Dropped: No. 8 Missouri State; No. 12 VCU; No. 17 Penn State	Dropped: No. 18 Marquette; No. 25 Wake Forest	Dropped: No. 11 Indiana; No. 16 North Carolina; No. 19 Seton Hall; No. 20 Oregon State; No. 23 Stanford	Dropped: No. 18 Lipscomb; No. 20 Akron	Dropped: No. 13 San Diego State; No. 17 Bowling Green; No. 23 UCLA; No. 25 Santa Clara	Dropped: No. 22 Rutgers; No. 23 Louisville	Dropped: No. 16 UNC Greensboro; No. 24 SMU; No. 25 Grand Canyon	Dropped: No. 14 Bowling Green; No. 15 Loyola Marymount; No. 23 James Madison; No. 25 West Virginia	Dropped: No. 20 Cornell; No. 21 Virginia Tech; No. 23 UCLA	Dropped: No. 21 Akron; No. 24 St. John's; No. 25 UNC Greensboro	Dropped: No. 23 North Carolina; No. 25 Grand Canyon	

== Top Drawer Soccer ==
	Week 1 Aug 26	Week 2 Aug 30	Week 3 Sep 6	Week 4 Sep 13	Week 5 Sep 20	Week 6 Sep 27	Week 7 Oct 4	Week 8 Oct 11	Week 9 Oct 18	Week 10 Oct 25	Week 11 Nov 1	Week 12 Nov 8	Week 13 Nov 15	Week 14 Nov 22	Week 15 Nov 29	Week 16 Dec 6	Final Dec 13	
1.	Marshall	Indiana (1–0–0)	Georgetown (3–0–0)	Georgetown (5–0–0)	Georgetown (6–0–0)	Georgetown (7–0–0)	Georgetown (8–0–0)	Georgetown (10–0–0)	Washington (12–0–0)	Georgetown (13–1–0)	Oregon State (11–1–2)	Washington (14–1–1)	Washington (14–1–2)	Washington (15–1–2)	Washington (16–1–2)	Washington (17–1–2)	Clemson (16–5–2)	1.
2.	Indiana	Pittsburgh (1–0–0)	North Carolina (2–0–1)	Clemson (5–0–0)	Clemson (7–0–0)	Washington (7–0–0)	Washington (9–0–0)	Washington (11–0–0)	Georgetown (11–1–0)	Washington (12–1–0)	Marshall (11–1–3)	Saint Louis (13–0–3)	Saint Louis (14–0–4)	Saint Louis (15–0–4)	Saint Louis (16–0–4)	Georgetown (17–2–1)	Washington (18–2–2)	2.
3.	Pittsburgh	Georgetown (2–0–0)	Clemson (3–0–0)	Washington (4–0–0)	Washington (6–0–0)	New Hampshire (9–0–0)	New Hampshire (11–0–0)	New Hampshire (12–0–0)	Marshall (8–1–3)	Marshall (10–1–3)	Washington (12–1–1)	Georgetown (14–2–0)	Georgetown (15–2–0)	Georgetown (16–2–0)	Georgetown (17–2–0)	Notre Dame (14–5–4)	Georgetown (17–3–1)	3.
4.	North Carolina	Marshall (1–1–0)	Washington (3–0–0)	North Carolina (3–1–1)	New Hampshire (7–0–0)	Tulsa (7–0–0)	Tulsa (9–0–0)	Marshall (7–1–3)	Saint Louis (10–0–3)	Saint Louis (11–0–3)	Saint Louis (12–0–3)	Oregon State (12–2–2)	Oregon State (12–2–3)	Oregon State (13–2–3)	Oregon State (14–2–3)	Clemson (15–5–1)	Notre Dame (14–5–5)	4.
5.	Georgetown	North Carolina (1–0–1)	Indiana (2–1–0)	Indiana (3–1–1)	Tulsa (6–0–0)	Loyola Marymount (8–0–1)	Marshall (6–1–3)	Loyola Marymount (9–1–1)	Tulsa (10–1–0)	Tulsa (11–1–0)	Georgetown (13–2–0)	Marshall (11–2–3)	Tulsa (15–1–1)	Tulsa (16–1–1)	West Virginia (12–3–5)	Saint Louis (16–1–4)	Saint Louis (16–1–4)	5.
6.	Wake Forest	Clemson (2–0–0)	Pittsburgh (2–1–0)	Akron (4–0–1)	Loyola Marymount (7–0–1)	SMU (5–0–2)	Duke (8–1–0)	Saint Louis (9–0–3)	Clemson (10–3–0)	Kentucky (9–0–4)	Tulsa (12–1–1)	Tulsa (13–1–1)	Missouri State (17–1–0)	New Hampshire (17–1–2)	Notre Dame (14–5–3)	Oregon State (14–2–4)	Oregon State (14–2–4)	6.
7.	Stanford	Washington (2–0–0)	Marshall (1–1–1)	Marshall (3–1–1)	SMU (4–0–2)	Marshall (4–1–3)	West Virginia (6–0–3)	Tulsa (9–1–0)	Kentucky (8–0–3)	New Hampshire (13–0–2)	New Hampshire (14–0–2)	New Hampshire (15–0–2)	Marshall (11–3–3)	Kentucky (15–1–4)	Pittsburgh (13–5–1)	West Virginia (12–3–6)	West Virginia (12–3–6)	7.
8.	Clemson	Wake Forest (1–1–0)	Wake Forest (2–1–0)	New Hampshire (5–0–0)	Marshall (3–1–2)	Duke (6–1–0)	SMU (6–1–2)	Pittsburgh (8–3–0)	New Hampshire (12–0–2)	Missouri State (12–1–0)	Missouri State (14–1–0)	Missouri State (15–1–0)	New Hampshire (16–1–2)	West Virginia (11–3–5)	Clemson (15–5–0)	Pittsburgh (13–5–2)	Pittsburgh (13–5–2)	8.
9.	Washington	Missouri State (2–0–0)	Marquette (3–0–0)	Tulsa (5–0–0)	Duke (5–1–0)	West Virginia (6–0–2)	Clemson (8–2–0)	Duke (9–2–0)	West Virginia (7–1–4)	Oregon State (10–1–2)	West Virginia (10–2–4)	West Virginia (11–2–4)	Kentucky (14–1–4)	Notre Dame (13–5–3)	Kentucky (15–2–4)	Kentucky (15–2–4)	Kentucky (15–2–4)	9.
10.	Penn State	Marquette (2–0–0)	West Virginia (3–0–0)	West Virginia (4–0–1)	West Virginia (4–0–2)	Clemson (7–2–0)	Loyola Marymount (8–1–1)	Grand Canyon (10–1–0)	Missouri State (11–1–0)	West Virginia (8–2–4)	Duke (11–3–1)	Duke (12–3–1)	West Virginia (11–3–4)	Duke (14–4–1)	New Hampshire (17–2–2)	New Hampshire (17–2–2)	New Hampshire (17–2–2)	10.
11.	Missouri State	Penn State (1–0–1)	Loyola Marymount (3–0–1)	Pittsburgh (3–2–0)	North Carolina (4–2–1)	North Carolina (5–2–1)	Rutgers (7–1–2)	West Virginia (6–1–4)	Oregon State (9–1–2)	Duke (10–3–1)	Kentucky (10–1–4)	Kentucky (11–1–4)	Notre Dame (12–5–3)	Hofstra (17–1–2)	Tulsa (16–2–1)	Tulsa (16–2–1)	Tulsa (16–2–1)	11.
12.	Marquette	Loyola Marymount (1–0–0)	SMU (2–0–0)	Loyola Marymount (5–0–1)	Rutgers (7–0–1)	Indiana (5–2–1)	Missouri State (8–1–0)	Kentucky (7–0–3)	Pittsburgh (8–4–0)	Grand Canyon (11–2–0)	Grand Canyon (14–2–0)	Pittsburgh (11–4–1)	Penn State (12–6–1)	Pittsburgh (12–5–1)	Duke (14–5–1)	Duke (14–5–1)	Duke (14–5–1)	12.
13.	Seton Hall	SMU (1–0–0)	Stanford (1–1–0)	SMU (2–0–2)	Indiana (3–2–1)	Maryland (7–1–0)	Kentucky (7–0–2)	Missouri State (9–1–0)	Duke (9–3–0)	Indiana (11–3–1)	Hofstra (14–1–1)	Grand Canyon (14–3–0)	Hofstra (15–1–2)	Indiana (15–4–1)	Hofstra (17–2–2)	Hofstra (17–2–2)	Hofstra (17–2–2)	13.
14.	UCF	Stanford (0–1–0)	Seton Hall (2–0–1)	Stanford (2–1–1)	Maryland (6–1–0)	Rutgers (7–1–1)	Saint Louis (7–0–3)	SMU (6–2–2)	Loyola Marymount (9–2–1)	Maryland (11–2–1)	Pittsburgh (10–4–1)	Hofstra (14–1–2)	Duke (13–4–1)	Clemson (14–5–0)	Indiana (15–5–1)	Indiana (15–5–1)	Indiana (15–5–1)	14.
15.	James Madison	Seton Hall (0–0–1)	Missouri State (2–1–0)	Seton Hall (3–0–2)	Akron (4–1–1)	Missouri State (6–1–0)	Oregon State (6–1–1)	Clemson (9–3–0)	Grand Canyon (10–2–0)	Hofstra (13–1–1)	Clemson (12–4–0)	Clemson (13–4–0)	Pittsburgh (11–5–1)	Providence (12–3–4)	Providence (12–4–4)	Providence (12–4–4)	Providence (12–4–4)	15.
16.	Loyola Marymount	Kentucky (0–0–1)	Kentucky (2–0–1)	Missouri State (3–1–0)	Missouri State (5–1–0)	Kentucky (5–0–2)	Grand Canyon (8–1–0)	Oregon State (7–1–2)	Rutgers (8–3–2)	Pittsburgh (8–4–1)	Maryland (12–3–1)	FIU (12–2–2)	Grand Canyon (15–3–1)	Missouri State (17–2–0)	Missouri State (17–2–0)	Missouri State (17–2–0)	Missouri State (17–2–0)	16.
17.	Kentucky	New Hampshire (2–0–0)	New Hampshire (3–0–0)	Kentucky (4–0–1)	Kentucky (5–0–1)	Grand Canyon (6–1–0)	North Carolina (6–3–1)	Rutgers (7–3–2)	Indiana (9–3–1)	Clemson (10–4–0)	Indiana (12–4–1)	Maryland (12–3–2)	Clemson (13–5–0)	Marshall (11–4–3)	Marshall (11–4–3)	Marshall (11–4–3)	Marshall (11–4–3)	17.
18.	Charlotte	Virginia Tech (1–0–1)	Virginia Tech (2–0–1)	Duke (4–1–0)	Wake Forest (4–2–0)	San Diego State (6–0–2)	Indiana (5–3–1)	Indiana (7–3–1)	Wake Forest (8–4–1)	Providence (9–2–3)	Providence (9–2–4)	Indiana (13–4–1)	FIU (12–3–2)	Penn State (12–7–1)	Penn State (12–7–1)	Penn State (12–7–1)	Penn State (12–7–1)	18.
19.	Virginia Tech	Saint Mary's (1–0–0)	James Madison (2–1–0)	James Madison (4–1–0)	Grand Canyon (5–1–0)	Akron (5–2–1)	Akron (5–2–2)	Wake Forest (6–4–1)	Maryland (10–2–1)	FIU (10–1–2)	FIU (11–2–2)	Providence (9–3–4)	Maryland (12–3–2)	Grand Canyon (15–4–1)	Grand Canyon (15–4–1)	Grand Canyon (15–4–1)	Grand Canyon (15–4–1)	19.
20.	New Hampshire	James Madison (1–1–0)	Maryland (3–0–0)	Penn State (3–1–1)	Rhode Island (5–1–1)	Wake Forest (4–2–1)	Maryland (7–2–1)	Maryland (8–2–1)	Hofstra (11–1–1)	Akron (8–3–3)	North Carolina (10–5–1)	North Carolina (11–6–1)	Indiana (14–4–1)	FIU (12–4–2)	FIU (12–4–2)	FIU (12–4–2)	FIU (12–4–2)	20.
21.	High Point	Maryland (2–0–0)	Penn State (1–1–1)	Grand Canyon (4–1–0)	San Diego State (5–0–2)	Pittsburgh (5–3–0)	Central Arkansas (8–1–0)	Virginia Tech (7–1–3)	Virginia Tech (8–2–3)	Cornell (10–2–1)	St. John's (10–4–2)	Penn State (11–6–1)	Providence (10–3–4)	Maryland (12–4–2)	Maryland (12–4–2)	Maryland (12–4–2)	Maryland (12–4–2)	21.
22.	SMU	Davidson (2–0–0)	Davidson (2–0–0)	Maryland (4–1–0)	Pittsburgh (4–3–0)	Hofstra (7–1–0)	Pittsburgh (6–3–0)	Hofstra (10–1–1)	UNC Wilmington (8–4–1)	Michigan (7–5–3)	NIU (12–1–2)	Santa Clara (11–1–3)	North Carolina (11–6–1)	North Carolina (11–7–2)	North Carolina (11–7–2)	North Carolina (11–7–2)	North Carolina (11–7–2)	22.
23.	Saint Mary's	Oregon State (1–0–0)	Oregon State (3–0–0)	FIU (4–0–1)	Penn State (4–2–1)	Providence (6–1–1)	Hofstra (9–1–0)	Bowling Green (9–2–1)	Providence (8–2–3)	North Carolina (9–5–1)	Akron (9–4–3)	UCLA (9–6–1)	Santa Clara (11–1–4)	Santa Clara (12–2–4)	Santa Clara (12–2–4)	Santa Clara (12–2–4)	Santa Clara (12–2–4)	23.
24.	Fordham	VCU (1–0–1)	FIU (3–0–0)	VCU (2–1–1)	Providence (4–1–1)	Saint Louis (5–0–3)	Providence (6–1–2)	Providence (7–1–3)	FIU (8–1–2)	St. John's (9–4–2)	Penn State (10–6–1)	Cornell (11–3–1)	UCLA (10–6–1)	UCLA (11–7–1)	UCLA (11–7–1)	UCLA (11–7–1)	UCLA (11–7–1)	24.
25.	Oregon State	Saint Louis (2–0–0)	Saint Louis (2–0–1)	Saint Louis (3–0–2)	Saint Louis (4–0–3)	Northeastern (7–1–1)	UNC Wilmington (7–3–0)	UNC Wilmington (7–3–1)	UCLA (8–4–0)	Virginia Tech (9–3–3)	Santa Clara (10–1–3)	Villanova (11–6–1)	Cornell (11–3–2)	Portland (11–7–1)	Portland (11–7–1)	Portland (11–7–1)	Portland (11–7–1)	25.
	Week 1 Aug 26	Week 2 Aug 30	Week 3 Sep 6	Week 4 Sep 13	Week 5 Sep 20	Week 6 Sep 27	Week 7 Oct 4	Week 8 Oct 11	Week 9 Oct 18	Week 10 Oct 25	Week 11 Nov 1	Week 12 Nov 8	Week 13 Nov 15	Week 14 Nov 22	Week 15 Nov 29	Week 16 Dec 6	Final Dec 13	
		Dropped: No. 14 UCF; No. 18 Charlotte; No. 21 High Point; No. 24 Fordham	Dropped: No. 19 Saint Mary's; No. 24 VCU	Dropped: No. 8 Wake Forest; No. 9 Marquette; No. 18 Virginia Tech; No. 22 Davidson; No. 23 Oregon State	Dropped: No. 14 Stanford; No. 15 Seton Hall; No. 19 James Madison; No. 23 FIU; No. 24 VCU	Dropped: No. 20 Rhode Island; No. 23 Penn State	Dropped: No. 18 San Diego State; No. 20 Wake Forest; No. 25 Northeastern	Dropped: No. 17 North Carolina; No. 19 Akron; No. 21 Central Arkansas	Dropped: No. 14 SMU; No. 23 Bowling Green	Dropped: No. 14 Loyola Marymount; No. 16 Rutgers; No. 18 Wake Forest; No. 22 UNC Wilmington; No. 25 UCLA	Dropped: No. 21 Cornell; No. 22 Michigan; No. 25 Virginia Tech	Dropped: No. 21 St. John's; No. 22 NIU; No. 23 Akron	Dropped: No. 25 Villanova	Dropped: No. 25 Cornell	Dropped: None	Dropped: None	Dropped: None	

== College Soccer News ==
	Preseason Aug 1	Week 1 Aug 30	Week 2 Sep 6	Week 3 Sep 13	Week 4 Sep 20	Week 5 Sep 26	Week 6 Oct 4	Week 7 Oct 11	Week 8 Oct 18	Week 9 Oct 25	Week 10 Nov 1	Week 11 Nov 7	Week 12 Nov 14	Final	
1.	Marshall	Indiana (1–0–0)	Clemson (3–0–0)	Clemson (5–0–0)	Clemson (7–0–0)	Georgetown (7–0–0)	Georgetown (8–0–0)	Georgetown (10–0–0)	Washington (12–0–0)	Washington (12–1–0)	Marshall (11–1–3)	Washington (14–1–1)	Washington (14–1–2)		1.
2.	Indiana	Pittsburgh (1–0–0)	Georgetown (3–0–0)	Georgetown (5–0–0)	Georgetown (6–0–0)	Washington (7–0–0)	Washington (9–0–0)	Washington (11–0–0)	Georgetown (11–1–0)	Georgetown (13–1–0)	Oregon State (11–1–2)	Georgetown (14–2–0)	Georgetown (16–2–0)		2.
3.	Pittsburgh	Marshall (1–1–0)	Indiana (2–1–0)	Indiana (3–1–1)	Washington (5–0–0)	West Virginia (6–0–2)	West Virginia (6–0–3)	New Hampshire (12–0–0)	Marshall (8–1–3)	Marshall (10–1–3)	Washington (12–1–1)	Oregon State (12–2–2)	Oregon State (12–2–3)		3.
4.	North Carolina	North Carolina (1–0–1)	North Carolina (2–0–1)	Washington (4–0–0)	West Virginia (4–0–2)	Maryland (7–1–0)	Duke (8–1–0)	Marshall (7–1–3)	Kentucky (8–0–3)	Kentucky (9–0–4)	Georgetown (13–2–0)	New Hampshire (15–0–2)	Tulsa (15–1–1)		4.
5.	Clemson	Clemson (2–0–0)	Pittsburgh (2–1–0)	Marshall (3–1–1)	Marshall (3–1–2)	New Hampshire (9–0–0)	New Hampshire (11–0–0)	Duke (9–2–0)	New Hampshire (12–0–2)	New Hampshire (13–0–2)	New Hampshire (14–0–2)	Marshall (11–2–3)	Missouri State (17–1–0)		5.
6.	Wake Forest	Georgetown (2–0–0)	Marshall (1–1–1)	West Virginia (4–0–1)	Maryland (5–1–0)	Duke (6–1–0)	Tulsa (9–0–0)	Kentucky (7–0–3)	Tulsa (10–1–0)	Tulsa (11–1–0)	Missouri State (14–1–0)	Missouri State (15–1–0)	Saint Louis (14–0–4)		6.
7.	Georgetown	Washington (2–0–0)	Washington (3–0–0)	Akron (4–0–1)	New Hampshire (7–0–0)	Marshall (4–1–3)	Marshall (6–1–3)	Tulsa (9–1–0)	Maryland (10–2–1)	Maryland (11–2–1)	Saint Louis (12–0–3)	Saint Louis (13–0–3)	Notre Dame (12–5–3)		7.
8.	Stanford	Missouri State (2–0–0)	Virginia Tech (2–0–1)	Maryland (4–1–0)	Tulsa (6–0–0)	Tulsa (6–0–0)	Clemson (8–2–0)	Virginia Tech (7–1–3)	Missouri State (11–1–0)	Missouri State (12–1–0)	Tulsa (12–1–1)	Tulsa (13–1–1)	Kentucky (14–1–4)		8.
9.	Washington	Penn State (1–0–1)	West Virginia (3–0–0)	Pittsburgh (3–2–0)	Duke (5–1–0)	Clemson (7–2–0)	Kentucky (7–0–2)	Loyola Marymount (9–1–1)	Duke (9–3–2)	Saint Louis (11–0–3)	Kentucky (10–1–4)	Pittsburgh (11–4–1)	New Hampshire (16–1–2)		9.
10.	Seton Hall	Wake Forest (1–1–0)	Wake Forest (2–1–0)	North Carolina (3–1–1)	Akron (4–1–1)	Virginia Tech (5–1–2)	Maryland (7–2–1)	Maryland (8–2–1)	Saint Louis (10–0–3)	Oregon State (9–1–2)	Pittsburgh (10–4–1)	Kentucky (11–1–4)	Penn State (13–6–1)		10.
11.	Missouri State	Virginia Tech (1–0–1)	Stanford (1–1–1)	Seton Hall (3–0–2)	Virginia Tech (3–1–2)	Loyola Marymount (8–0–1)	Virginia Tech (6–1–3)	West Virginia (6–1–4)	Virginia Tech (8–2–3)	Duke (10–3–1)	Clemson (12–4–0)	Clemson (13–4–0)	Marshall (11–3–3)		11.
12.	Penn State	Stanford (0–1–0)	Seton Hall (2–0–1)	New Hampshire (5–0–0)	Kentucky (5–0–1)	Kentucky (5–0–2)	Loyola Marymount (8–1–1)	Pittsburgh (8–3–0)	Clemson (10–3–0)	FIU (10–1–2)	Duke (11–3–1)	Duke (12–3–1)	Duke (13–4–1)		12.
13.	UCF	Seton Hall (0–0–1)	Missouri State (2–1–0)	Virginia Tech (2–1–2)	Loyola Marymount (6–0–1)	SMU (5–0–2)	Akron (5–2–2)	Missouri State (9–1–0)	West Virginia (7–1–4)	Clemson (10–4–0)	Maryland (12–3–1)	FIU (12–2–2)	Hofstra (16–1–2)		13.
14.	Virginia Tech	Marquette (2–0–0)	Marquette (3–0–0)	Missouri State (3–1–0)	Missouri State (5–1–0)	Akron (5–2–1)	Missouri State (8–0–1)	Saint Louis (9–0–3)	Oregon State (8–1–2)	Pittsburgh (8–4–1)	Grand Canyon (14–2–0)	West Virginia (11–2–4)	Pittsburgh (11–5–1)		14.
15.	Marquette	Loyla Marymount (1–0–0)	Oregon State (3–0–0)	Kentucky (4–0–1)	SMU (4–0–2)	Missouri State (6–1–0)	SMU (6–1–2)	Clemson (9–3–0)	Loyola Marymount (9–2–1)	Virginia Tech (9–3–3)	Hofstra (14–1–1)	Hofstra (14–1–2)	Clemson (13–5–0)		15.
16.	Loyola Marymount	Oregon State (1–0–0)	FIU (3–0–0)	Stanford (2–1–1)	Providence (4–1–1)	Providence (6–1–1)	Pittsburgh (6–3–0)	Grand Canyon (10–1–0)	Pittsburgh (8–4–0)	Grand Canyon (12–2–0)	NIU (12–1–2)	Maryland (12–3–2)	Maryland (12–3–2)		16.
17.	Kentucky	Kentucky (0–0–1)	Kentucky (2–0–1)	FIU (4–0–1)	Seton Hall (4–1–2)	Pittsburgh (5–3–1)	Grand Canyon (8–1–0)	Oregon State (7–1–2)	Grand Canyon (10–2–0)	Providence (9–2–3)	West Virginia (10–2–4)	Indiana (13–4–1)	Santa Clara (11–1–4)		17.
18.	Charlotte	VCU (1–0–1)	Loyola Marymount (2–0–1)	Loyola Marymount (5–0–1)	Pittsburgh (4–3–1)	San Diego State (6–0–2)	Providence (6–1–2)	James Madison (10–2–1)	Bowling Green (9–2–2)	Hofstra (13–1–1)	Providence (9–2–4)	Grand Canyon (14–3–0)	NIU (14–2–2)		18.
19.	James Madison	FIU (2–0–0)	New Hampshire (3–0–0)	Penn State (3–1–1)	Rutgers (6–0–1)	North Carolina (5–2–1)	Oregon State (6–1–1)	SMU (6–2–2)	James Madison (10–3–0)	West Virginia (8–2–4)	UNC Greensboro (13–3–1)	Santa Clara (11–1–3)	Grand Canyon (15–3–1)		19.
20.	Oregon State	UCF (1–1–0)	Penn State (1–1–1)	Tulsa (5–0–0)	North Carolina (4–2–1)	Rutgers (7–1–1)	Rutgers (7–1–2)	Bowling Green (9–2–1)	FIU (8–1–2)	Indiana (11–3–1)	FIU (11–2–2)	NIU (12–2–2)	Indiana (14–5–1)		20.
21.	High Point	New Hampshire (2–0–0)	Maryland (3–0–0)	Oregon State (4–1–0)	Oregon State (4–1–0)	Indiana (5–2–1)	Saint Louis (7–0–3)	Providence (7–1–3)	Providence (8–2–3)	Akron (8–3–3)	Indiana (12–4–1)	Providence (9–3–4)	Providence (10–4–4)		21.
22.	Fordham	Grand Canyon (2–0–0)	VCU (1–1–1)	VCU (2–1–1)	Indiana (3–2–1)	Bowling Green (7–1–1)	San Diego State (6–2–2)	UNC Greensboro (9–2–1)	Wake Forest (8–4–1)	UNC Greensboro (11–3–1)	Virginia Tech (9–4–3)	Notre Dame (12–4–1)	FIU (12–3–2)		22.
23.	New Hampshire	Maryland (2–0–0)	James Madison (2–1–0)	James Madison (4–1–0)	Penn State (4–2–1)	Grand Canyon (6–1–0)	Bowling Green (7–2–1)	FIU (7–1–2)	Indiana (9–3–1)	Cornell (10–2–1)	Wake Forest (10–5–1)	Penn State (11–6–1)	West Virginia (11–3–4)		23.
24.	Grand Canyon	Charlotte (1–1–0)	Charlotte (2–1–0)	Duke (4–1–0)	Bowling Green (5–1–1)	Oregon State (4–1–1)	FIU (7–1–1)	Cornell (7–1–1)	Akron (7–3–2)	James Madison (10–4–1)	North Carolina (10–5–1)	North Carolina (11–6–1)	North Carolina (11–6–1)		24.
25.	Yale	James Madison (1–1–0)	Tulsa (3–0–0)	Wake Forest (2–2–0)	Wake Forest (3–2–0)	FIU (6–1–1)	James Madison (8–2–0)	Wisconsin (6–2–3)	UNC Greensboro (9–3–1)	Wake Forest (9–5–1)	James Madison (11–4–1)	Virginia Tech (10–5–3)	Princeton (12–5–0)		25.
26.	Saint Mary's	Saint Mary's (1–0–0)	SMU (2–0–0)	Grand Canyon (4–1–0)	San Diego State (5–0–2)	Saint Louis (5–0–3)	Santa Clara (7–1–1)	Akron (6–3–2)	Cornell (8–2–1)	Bowling Green (9–3–2)	Santa Clara (10–1–3)	UNC Greensboro (13–4–1)	UC Santa Barbara (12–4–4)		26.
27.	Coastal Carolina	SMU (1–0–0)	Grand Canyon (2–1–0)	SMU (2–0–2)	Grand Canyon (5–1–0)	Wake Forest (4–2–1)	UNC Greensboro (8–2–1)	Rutgers (7–3–2)	Rutgers (8–3–2)	Loyola Marymount (9–4–1)	Loyola Marymount (11–4–1)	Princeton (11–5–0)	Virginia Tech (10–5–3)		27.
28.	Maryland	Saint Louis (2–0–0)	Akron (3–0–0)	Marquette (3–2–0)	FIU (4–1–1)	James Madison (7–2–0)	Central Arkansas (8–1–0)	Santa Clara (7–1–2)	Hofstra (11–1–1)	NIU (11–1–2)	Akron (9–4–3)	Wake Forest (11–6–1)	Wake Forest (11–6–1)		28.
29.	UNCG	Davidson (2–0–0)	Lipscomb (3–0–0)	Lipscomb (4–0–1)	James Madison (5–2–0)	Seton Hall (4–2–2)	North Carolina (6–3–1)	Wake Forest (6–4–1)	NIU (10–1–1)	Notre Dame (9–4–2)	Notre Dame (9–5–2)	Loyola Marymount (12–4–1)	Campbell (15–3–2)		29.
30.	Denver	High Point (1–1–0)т Yale (0–0–0)т	Duke (3–0–0)т Saint Louis (2–0–1)т	Saint Louis (3–0–2)т Xavier (5–1–0)т	Saint Louis (4–0–3)т Rhode Island (5–1–1)т	Santa Clara (6–1–1)	Cornell (6–1–1)т Hofstra (9–1–0)т	NIU (10–1–0)	UCLA (8–4–0)	UC Santa Barbara (10–3–4)	St. John's (10–4–2)т Princeton (10–5–0)т	UC Santa Barbara (11–4–4)т Campbell (13–3–2)т	UCLA (10–6–1)		30.
	Preseason Aug 1	Week 1 Aug 30	Week 2 Sep 6	Week 3 Sep 13	Week 4 Sep 20	Week 5 Sep 26	Week 6 Oct 4	Week 7 Oct 11	Week 8 Oct 18	Week 9 Oct 25	Week 10 Nov 1	Week 11 Nov 7	Week 12 Nov 14	Final	
		Dropped: No. 22 Fordham; No. 27 Coastal Carolina; No. 29 UNCG; No. 30 Denver	Dropped: No. 20 UCF; No. 26 Saint Mary's; No. 29 Davidson; No. 30т Yale; No. 30т High Point	Dropped: No. 24 Charlotte	Dropped: No. 16 Stanford; No. 22 VCU; No. 28 Marquette; No. 29 Lipscomb; No. 30т Xavier	Dropped: No. 23 Penn State; No. 30т Rhode Island	Dropped: No. 21 Indiana; No. 27 Wake Forest; No. 29 Seton Hall	Dropped: No. 22 San Diego State; No. 28 Central Arkansas; No. 29 North Carolina; No. 30т Hofstra	Dropped: No. 19 SMU; No. 25 Wisconsin; No. 28 Santa Clara	Dropped: No. 27 Rutgers; No. 30 UCLA	Dropped: No. 23 Cornell; No. 26 Bowling Green; No. 30 UC Santa Barbara	Dropped: No. 25 James Madison; No. 28 Akron; No. 30т St. John's	Dropped: No. 26 UNC Greensboro; No. 29 Loyola Marymount	None	
