= Detre Bell =

Bermudian footballer

Personal information
- Date of birth: 3 August 1997 (age 29)
- Height: 1.82 m (5 ft 11 1/2 in)
- Position: Goalkeeper

Team information
- Current team: North Village Rams

Youth career
- 2015: South Kent School

College career
Years	Team	Apps	(Gls)
2016	UConn Huskies	0	(0)
2017–2019	Cal State Bakersfield Roadrunners	43	(0)
2020–2021	Louisville Cardinals	23	(0)

Senior career*
Years	Team	Apps	(Gls)
2022–	North Village Rams		

International career^{‡}
- Bermuda U20
2015–	Bermuda	2	(0)
- * Club domestic league appearances and goals as of 17:03, 27 December 2023 (UTC) ‡ National team caps and goals as of 17:03, 27 December 2023 (UTC)

Detre Bell (born 8 March 1997) is a Bermudian international footballer who plays as a goalkeeper for North Village Rams. He formerly played college soccer for the Louisville Cardinals.

== Career ==
Bell played college soccer for UConn, Cal State Bakersfield, and Louisville. He transferred to Louisville in December 2020.

He debuted for North Village Rams in 2022.

He made his international debut for Bermuda in 2015. At the youth level he played in the 2017 CONCACAF U-20 Championship.
