= 2022 Syracuse Orange men's soccer team =

American college soccer season

2022 Syracuse Orange men's soccer

ACC tournament champions ACC Atlantic Division champions

NCAA tournament, College Cup National Champions
- Conference: Atlantic Coast Conference

Ranking
- Coaches: No. 1
- TopDrawerSoccer.com: No. 1
- Record: 19–2–4 (5–1–2 ACC)
- Head coach: Ian McIntyre (13th season)
- Assistant coaches: Jukka Masalin (13th season); Sean Lawlor (3rd season)
- Home stadium: SU Soccer Stadium

2022 ACC men's soccer standings
	Conf.					Overall
Team	W		L		T	W		L		T
Atlantic
No. 1 Syracuse ‡	5	–	1	–	2	18	–	2	–	5
No. 24 Wake Forest +	5	–	3	–	0	14	–	6	–	0
Louisville +	4	–	3	–	1	9	–	6	–	3
No. 13 Clemson +	3	–	4	–	1	13	–	7	–	1
Boston College	1	–	4	–	3	4	–	7	–	5
NC State	1	–	5	–	2	6	–	7	–	5
Coastal
No. 3 Duke +	5	–	0	–	3	13	–	2	–	4
No. 16 Virginia +	5	–	1	–	2	10	–	4	–	5
No. 8 Pittsburgh +	3	–	2	–	3	12	–	5	–	5
North Carolina +	2	–	2	–	4	8	–	6	–	5
Notre Dame	3	–	4	–	1	8	–	7	–	2
Virginia Tech	0	–	8	–	0	3	–	14	–	1
‡ – ACC Tournament champion + – Also invited to the 2022 NCAA tournament; As of December 13, 2022; Rankings from United Soccer Coaches; Source: The ACC

The 2022 season is the 103rd season of Syracuse University fielding a men's varsity soccer team. It was the program's 10th season in the Atlantic Coast Conference, and their 13th season with Ian McIntyre as the head coach of the program. Syracuse played their home matches at SU Soccer Stadium in Syracuse, New York.

The 2022 season was the most successful season in program history. It was the first time a team from the university reached the NCAA Division I men's soccer tournament championship game going on to defeat #13 Indiana, 7–6 on penalties after a 2–2 draw. It was the program's first national soccer title since 1936.

== Background ==
In 2021, the Orange finished the season 8–8–2 overall and 2–5–1 in ACC play to finish in fifth in the Atlantic Division. As the tenth overall seed in the ACC Tournament, they lost to North Carolina in the First Round. They were not invited to the NCAA Tournament.

== Player movement ==
=== Players Leaving ===
Departures
Name	Number	Pos.	Height	Weight	Year	Hometown	Reason for departure
Andres Quevedo	0	GK	6'0"	169	Junior	Dallas, Texas	Graduated
Deandre Kerr	7	FW	5'11"	—	Sophomore	Ajax, Ontario	Signed Homegrown player contract with Toronto FC
Manel Busquets	10	FW	6'3"	175	Senior	Barcelona, Spain	Graduated
Hilli Goldhar	11	MF	5'9"	149	Senior	Toronto, Canada	Graduated; Transferred to North Carolina
Kyle Gruno	14	DF	6'4"	—	Sophomore	Bonita Springs, Florida	Transferred to FAU
Luke Biasi	17	DF	6'0"	180	Graduate Student	Buford, Georgia	Graduated
Max Kent	20	DF	6'2"	—	Graduate Student	Minneapolis, Minnesota	Graduated
Kenny Clapp	24	DF	6'0"	170	Sophomore	Baltimore, Maryland	Transferred to Lycoming College
Zephyn Brockert-Kress	29	DF	—	—	Freshman	Farmington Hills, Michigan	—
Jack Anderson	31	DF	—	—	Freshman	Holyoke, Massachusetts	Transferred to UMass

=== Players Arriving ===
==== Incoming transfers ====
Incoming transfers
Name	Number	Pos.	Height	Weight	Year	Hometown	Previous school
Nathan Opoku	10	FW	6'0"	173	Sophomore	Accra, Ghana	Lindsey Wilson College
Lorenzo Boselli	11	MF	5'11"	172	Junior	Bregnano, Italy	Dallas College
Gavin Wigg	12	DF	6'2"	171	Junior	Columbus, Ohio	Western Michigan
Levonte Johnson	14	FW	5'10"	185	Senior	Brampton, Ontario	Seattle
Louie Bulger	15	DF	5'10"	157	Senior	Tokyo, Japan	Butler

==== Recruiting class ====
Name	Nationality	Hometown	Club	TDS Rating
Marc Chin; MF	USA	Oviedo, Florida	Montverde Academy	3/5 stars
Samuel Coss; GK	USA	Bowie, Maryland	Baltimore Armour	2/5 stars
Andrea Di Blasio; FW	USA	New York, New York	Met Oval	3/5 stars
Antonino Pagano; MF	USA	Manlius, New York	Fayetteville–Manlius	3/5 stars

== Squad ==
=== Roster ===
As of January 30, 2023

Note: Flags indicate national team as defined under FIFA eligibility rules; some limited exceptions apply. Players may hold more than one non-FIFA nationality.

No.	Pos.	Nation	Player
0	GK	USA	Sam Coss
1	GK	USA	Russell Shealy
2	DF	CAN	Christian Curti
3	DF	USA	Abdi Salim
4	DF	GER	Noah Singelmann
5	MF	CRC	Amferny Sinclair
6	MF	USA	Julio Fulcar
7	MF	USA	Curt Calov
8	MF	USA	Jeorgio Kocevski
9	FW	GER	Julius Rauch
10	FW	GHA	Nathan Opoku
11	MF	ITA	Lorenzo Boselli
12	DF	USA	Gavin Wigg
13	MF	USA	Colin Biros
14	FW	CAN	Levonte Johnson
15	DF	JPN	Louie Bulger
16	MF	USA	Michal Gradus

No.	Pos.	Nation	Player
17	MF	USA	Giona Leibold
18	FW	USA	Camden Holbrook
19	DF	SWE	Buster Sjoberg
20	MF	USA	Trevor Carabin
21	DF	USA	Stephen Betz
22	DF	CAN	Olu Oyegunle
23	DF	USA	Jackson Glenn
24	FW	USA	Andrea DiBlasio
25	GK	USA	Parker Kump
26	MF	USA	Tony Shaw
27	DF	USA	Aidan Arber
28	FW	USA	Francesco Pagano
29	MF	USA	Antonio Pagano
30	GK	CAN	Jahiem Wickham
31	MF	CAN	Noah Lechelt
32	DF	USA	Marc Chin
40	GK	USA	Lucas Daunhauer

=== Team management ===
Position	Staff
Athletic director	John Wildhack
Head coach	Ian McIntyre
Associate head coach	Jukka Masalin
Assistant coach	Sean Lawlor

== Schedule ==
Date Time, TV	Rank^{#}	Opponent^{#}	Result	Record	Site (Attendance) City, State
Preseason
August 13*; 7:00 pm		Marist	W 6–0	–	SU Soccer Stadium; Syracuse, NY
August 16*; 5:00 pm		Villanova	L 1–2	–	SU Soccer Stadium; Syracuse, NY
August 20*; 6:30 pm		Saint Francis (PA)	W 5–1	–	SU Soccer Stadium; Syracuse, NY
Regular season
August 25*; 5:00 pm, ACCNX		Iona	W 2–0	1–0–0	SU Soccer Stadium (596); Syracuse, NY
August 28*; 6:00 pm, ACCN		No. 21 Penn State; Rivalry	W 1–0	2–0–0	SU Soccer Stadium (1,556); Syracuse, NY
September 2*; 7:00 pm	No. 15	at Vermont	T 1–1	2–0–1	Virtue Field (741); Burlington, VT
September 5*; 7:00 pm	No. 15	at UConn; Rivalry	W 5–0	3–0–1	Morrone Stadium (2,052); Storrs, CT
September 10; 1:00 pm, ACCNX	No. 24	No. 22 Notre Dame	W 1–0	4–0–1 (1–0–0)	SU Soccer Stadium (1,872); Syracuse, NY
September 13*; 7:00 pm, ACCNX	No. 16	Niagara	W 1–0	5–0–1	SU Soccer Stadium (461); Syracuse, NY
September 16; 7:00 pm, ACCN	No. 16	at No. 1 Clemson	W 2–1	6–0–1 (2–0–0)	Riggs Field (4,737); Clemson, SC
September 20*; 7:00 pm, ACCN	No. 3	at Colgate	W 2–0	7–0–1	Beyer–Small '76 Field (468); Hamilton, NY
September 24; 7:00 pm, ACCNX	No. 3	No. 21 Virginia	L 0–1	7–1–1 (2–1–0)	SU Soccer Stadium (2,311); Syracuse, NY
September 30; 7:00 pm	No. 7	at Virginia Tech	W 3–0	8–1–1 (3–1–0)	Sandra D. Thompson Field (150); Blacksburg, VA
October 4*; 7:00 pm, ACCNX	No. 7	No. 22 Cornell	L 1–2	8–2–1	SU Soccer Stadium (570); Syracuse, NY
October 7; 7:00 pm, ACCNX	No. 7	No. 4 Wake Forest	W 2–0	9–2–1 (4–1–0)	SU Soccer Stadium (1,052); Syracuse, NY
October 10*; 6:00 pm, ACCNX	No. 7	Loyola (MD)	W 6–1	10–2–1	SU Soccer Stadium (512); Syracuse, NY
October 14; 7:00 pm	No. 5	at No. 11 Louisville	W 2–1	11–2–1 (5–1–0)	Lynn Stadium (1,388); Louisville, KY
October 18*; 7:00 pm, ACCNX	No. 4	Bucknell	W 2–1	12–2–1	SU Soccer Stadium (309); Syracuse, NY
October 22; 7:00 pm	No. 4	at NC State	T 1–1	12–2–2 (5–1–1)	Dail Soccer Field (895); Raleigh, NC
October 28; 7:00 pm, ACCNX	No. 4	Boston College; Rivalry	T 1–1	12–2–3 (5–1–2)	SU Soccer Stadium (1,201); Syracuse, NY
ACC tournament
November 6; 6:00 pm, ACCNX	(2) No. 4	(7) North Carolina; Quarterfinals	W 1–0	13–2–3	SU Soccer Stadium (1,292); Syracuse, NY
November 9; 5:00 pm, ACCN	(2) No. 4	(3) No. 11 Virginia; Semifinals	T 2–2 (W 5–3 P) ^{2OT}	13–2–4	SU Soccer Stadium (1,340); Syracuse, NY
November 13; 5:00 pm, ESPNU	(2) No. 4	vs. (8) No. 18 Clemson; Final	W 2–0	14–2–4	WakeMed Soccer Park (2,193); Cary, NC
NCAA tournament
November 20*; 2:00 pm, ESPN+	(3) No. 4	No. 23 Penn; Second round	W 2–1	15–2–4	SU Soccer Stadium (595); Syracuse, NY
November 27*; 2:00 pm, ESPN+	(3) No. 4	(14) No. 17 Cornell; Third round	W 1–0	16–2–4	SU Soccer Stadium (620); Syracuse, NY
December 3*; 2:00 pm, ESPN+	(3) No. 4	No. 8 Vermont; Quarterfinals	W 2–1	17–2–4	SU Soccer Stadium (1,762); Syracuse, NY
December 9*; 6:00 pm, ESPNU	(3) No. 4	vs. No. 9 Creighton; College Cup semifinals	W 3–2	18–2–4	WakeMed Soccer Park (10,286); Cary, NC
December 12*; 6:00 pm, ESPNU	(3) No. 4	vs. (13) No. 12 Indiana; College Cup final	W 2–2 (7–6 P) ^{2OT}	19–2–4	WakeMed Soccer Park (4,010); Cary, NC
*Non-conference game. ^{#}Rankings from United Soccer Coaches. (#) Tournament seedings in parentheses. All times are in Eastern Time.

== Awards and honors ==
Recipient	Award	Date	Ref.
Amferny Sinclair	Pre-Season ACC Watchlist	August 16	
Levonte Johnson	Hermann Trophy Pre-Season Watchlist	August 25	
Christian Curti	ACC Defensive Player of the Week	August 30	
Levonte Johnson	ACC Offensive Player of the Week	September 20	
Russell Shealy	ACC Defensive Player of the Week	September 20	
Philip Horton	ACC Offensive Player of the Week	October 4	
Russell Shealy	ACC Defensive Player of the Week	October 4	
Jeorgio Kocevski	ACC Offensive Player of the Week	October 11	
Buster Sjoberg	ACC Defensive Player of the Week	October 18	
Ian McIntyre	ACC Coach of the Year	November 9	
Levonte Johnson	All-ACC First Team	November 9	
Nathan Opoku	All-ACC First Team	November 9	
Russell Shealy	All-ACC Second Team	November 9	
Christian Curti	All-ACC Third Team	November 9	
Jeorgio Kocevski	All-ACC Third Team	November 9	
Ian McIntyre and the coaching staff	United Soccer Coaches National Coaching Staff of the Year	December 16	

== 2023 MLS Super Draft ==
Player	Team	Round	Pick #	Position
Abdi Salim	Orlando City SC	1	17	DF
Levonte Johnson	Vancouver Whitecaps FC	1	29	FW
Amferny Sinclair	Real Salt Lake	2	45	MF
Russell Shealy	LA Galaxy	2	52	GK
Buster Sjöberg	Vancouver Whitecaps FC	3	71	DF

== Rankings ==
Ranking movements Legend: ██ Increase in ranking ██ Decrease in ranking — = Not ranked ( ) = First-place votes
	Week																
Poll	Pre	1	2	3	4	5	6	7	8	9	10	11	12	13	14	15	Final
United Soccer	—	15	24	16	3	7	7	5	4	4	4	3	Not released				1 (6)
TopDrawer Soccer	—	—	—	13	8	7	6	7	3	3	4	3	1	1	1	1	1
