= 2022 Clemson Tigers men's soccer team =

American college soccer season

2022 Clemson Tigers men's soccer

NCAA Tournament, Second Round
- Conference: Atlantic Coast Conference
- Record: 13–7–1 (3–4–1 ACC)
- Head coach: Mike Noonan (13th season)
- Assistant coaches: Philip Jones (10th season); Camilo Rodriguez (7th season)
- Home stadium: Riggs Field

2022 ACC men's soccer standings
	Conf.					Overall
Team	W		L		T	W		L		T
Atlantic
No. 1 Syracuse ‡	5	–	1	–	2	18	–	2	–	5
No. 24 Wake Forest +	5	–	3	–	0	14	–	6	–	0
Louisville +	4	–	3	–	1	9	–	6	–	3
No. 13 Clemson +	3	–	4	–	1	13	–	7	–	1
Boston College	1	–	4	–	3	4	–	7	–	5
NC State	1	–	5	–	2	6	–	7	–	5
Coastal
No. 3 Duke +	5	–	0	–	3	13	–	2	–	4
No. 16 Virginia +	5	–	1	–	2	10	–	4	–	5
No. 8 Pittsburgh +	3	–	2	–	3	12	–	5	–	5
North Carolina +	2	–	2	–	4	8	–	6	–	5
Notre Dame	3	–	4	–	1	8	–	7	–	2
Virginia Tech	0	–	8	–	0	3	–	14	–	1
‡ – ACC Tournament champion + – Also invited to the 2022 NCAA tournament; As of December 13, 2022; Rankings from United Soccer Coaches; Source: The ACC

The 2022 Clemson Tigers men's soccer team represented Clemson University during the 2022 NCAA Division I men's soccer season. They were led by head coach Mike Noonan, in his thirteenth season. They played their home games at Riggs Field. This was the team's 62nd season playing organized men's college soccer and their 35th playing in the Atlantic Coast Conference.

The Tigers finished the season 13–7–1 overall and 3–4–1 in ACC play to finish in fourth place in the Atlantic Division. As the eighth overall seed in the ACC Tournament, they defeated Notre Dame in the First Round, top seed Duke in the Quarterfinals, fourth seed Wake Forest in the Semifinals and became the lowest seed to reach the final in ACC Tournament history. They came up short in the final losing to eventual National Champion Syracuse 2–0. They received an at large bid to the NCAA Tournament and were awarded the sixth overall seed. After a First Round bye, they lost to UCLA in the Second Round to end their National Title defense.

== Background ==
The Tigers finished the season 16–5–2 overall and 5–3–0 in ACC play to finish in a tie for first in the Atlantic Division. As the second overall seed in the ACC Tournament, they defeated North Carolina in the Quarterfinals before losing to Duke in the Semifinals. They received an at large bid to the NCAA Tournament and were awarded the eight overall seed. After a First Round bye, they defeated Denver in overtime in the Second Round and Kentucky in the Third Round. In the quarterfinals, they face off against top seed Oregon State, who they defeated on penalties to advance. Penalties were required again to defeat Notre Dame in the Semifinals. In the Final Clemson defeated Washington to win their third National Title in program history.

== Player movement ==
=== Players leaving ===
Players Leaving
Name	Number	Pos.	Height	Weight	Year	Hometown	Reason for Departure
George Marks	1	GK	6'1"	177	Senior	Charlotte, North Carolina	Graduated, Drafted 57th overall in the 2022 MLS SuperDraft
Oskar Ågren	3	DF	6'3"	180	Junior	Malmo, Sweden	Drafted 13th overall in the 2022 MLS SuperDraft
Justin Malou	4	DF	5'11"	175	Senior	Kedougou, Senegal	Graduated
Callum Johnson	8	MF	5'9"	165	Junior	New York, New York	Drafted 42nd overall in the 2022 MLS SuperDraft
Luis Felipe Fernandez-Salvador	10	MF	5'10"	165	Senior	Royal Palm Beach, Florida	Graduated, Drafted 44th overall in the 2022 MLS SuperDraft
Camilo Comi	11	FW	5'7"	147	Freshman	Rosario, Argentina	Transferred to VCU
John Martin	13	MF/DF	5'9"	155	Senior	Clemson, South Carolina	Graduated, Drafted 64th overall in the 2022 MLS SuperDraft
Charlie Asensio	15	DF	5'9"	155	Senior	Roswell, Georgia	Graduated, Drafted 35th overall in the 2022 MLS SuperDraft
Quinn McNeill	17	MF	5'11"	160	(redshirt) Senior	Greenville, South Carolina	Graduated, Signed with Charlotte FC
Josh Hallenberger	23	FW	5'10"	155	Sophomore	San Antonio, Texas	Transferred to Akron
James Brighton	25	FW	6'1"	190	(redshirt) Junior	Hilton Head Island, South Carolina	Graduated
Jake Barron	26	DF	6'2"	175	(redshirt) Junior	Orlando, Florida	Graduated
Tyler Hutchinson	29	DF	5'9"	160	Sophomore	Cliffside Park, New Jersey	Transferred to Seton Hall
Giles Thaxter	31	GK	6'3"	195	Senior	Richmond, Virginia	Graduated

=== Players arriving ===
==== Incoming transfers ====
Incoming transfers
Name	Number	Pos.	Height	Weight	Year	Hometown	Previous School
Joey Skinner	13	DF	6'2"	155	Sophomore	Charlotte, North Carolina	UNC Greensboro
Derek Waleffe	16	MF	5'11"	167	Graduate Student	Madison, Wisconsin	Brown

==== Recruiting class ====
Name	Nat.	Hometown	Club	TDS Rating
Joseph Andema; GK	GHA	Accra, Ghana	Montverde Academy	2/5 stars
Noah Behrmann; MF	USA	Charlotte, North Carolina	Charlotte Independence Soccer Club	3/5 stars
Patrick Donovan; GK	USA	Westport, Connecticut	Beachside SC	3/5 stars
Marco Garcia; FW	ITA	Liguria, Italy	Alabama FC	2/5 stars
Aiden Hampton; GK	USA	Southbury, Connecticut	Connecticut Rash	2/5 stars
James Kelly; MF	USA	Gastonia, North Carolina	Charlotte Soccer Academy	3/5 stars
Michael John Petry; MF	USA	Mount Pleasant, South Carolina	South Carolina United FC	3/5 stars
Nathan Richmond; MF	USA	Atlanta, Georgia	IMG Academy	4/5 stars
Shawn Smart; DF	USA	Apopka, Florida	Montverde Academy	3/5 stars
Tyler Trimnal; FW	USA	Lancaster, South Carolina	Charlotte Soccer Academy	3/5 stars
Terry Watson; DF	USA	Blythewood, South Carolina	South Carolina United FC	3/5 stars

== Squad ==
=== Roster ===
As of January 6, 2023

Note: Flags indicate national team as defined under FIFA eligibility rules; some limited exceptions apply. Players may hold more than one non-FIFA nationality.

No.	Pos.	Nation	Player
0	GK	USA	Patrick Donovan
1	GK	USA	Trevor Manion
3	DF	USA	Adam Lundegard
4	DF	USA	Dawson Malcolm
5	DF	SEN	Hamady Diop
6	DF	USA	Dylan Sullivan
7	FW	SWE	Tim Ströbeck
8	MF	USA	Elton Chifamba
9	MF	ESP	Mohamed Seye
10	MF	SEN	Ousmane Sylla
11	MF	USA	Brandon Parrish
12	DF	USA	Enrique Montana III
13	DF	USA	Joey Skinner
14	DF	USA	Titus Sandy Jr
15	DF	USA	Terry Watson

No.	Pos.	Nation	Player
16	MF	USA	Derek Waleffe
17	FW	USA	Tyler Trimnal
18	MF	ESP	Alvaro Gomez
19	FW	USA	James Kelly
20	DF	USA	Shawn Smart
21	MF	USA	Noah Behrmann
22	GK	USA	Aiden Hampton
24	MF	USA	MJ Petry
25	MF	USA	Nathan Richmond
26	FW	ITA	Marco Garcia
27	FW	USA	Isaiah Reid
28	DF	USA	Ben Erkens
29	FW	USA	Isaiah Easley
31	GK	GHA	Joseph Andema

=== Team management ===
Position	Staff
Athletic Director	(United States) Dan Radakovich
Head coach	(United States) Mike Noonan
Associate head coach	(England) Philip Jones
Assistant Coach	(Colombia) Camilo Rodriguez
Director of Operations	(United States) Rob Thompson

== Schedule ==
Date Time, TV	Rank^{#}	Opponent^{#}	Result	Record	Site (Attendance) City, State
Exhibition
August 13*; 7:00 p.m.	No. 1	at Wofford	L 1–3	–	Snyder Field; Spartanburg, SC
August 16*; 7:00 p.m.	No. 1	at Furman	W 3–0	–	Stone Stadium; Greenville, SC
August 20*	No. 1	Georgia State		–	Soccer Practice Facility; Clemson, SC
Regular season
August 26*; 7:00 p.m.	No. 1	No. 13 Indiana	W 3–2	1–0–0	Riggs Field (6,539); Clemson, SC
August 29*; 7:00 p.m.	No. 1	USC Upstate	W 2–0	2–0–0	Riggs Field (3,053); Clemson, SC
September 2*; 7:00 p.m.	No. 1	at South Carolina	W 1–0	3–0–0	Stone Stadium (5,449); Columbia, SC
September 6*; 6:00 p.m.	No. 1	UNC Asheville	W 4–0	4–0–0	Riggs Field (1,504); Clemson, SC
September 10; 7:00 p.m.	No. 1	at Boston College	W 2–1	5–0–0 (1–0–0)	Newton Campus Soccer Field (1,208); Chestnut Hill, MA
September 13*; 8:00 p.m.	No. 1	at UAB	W 2–0	6–0–0	PNC Field (934); Birmingham, AL
September 16; 8:00 p.m.	No. 1	No. 16 Syracuse	L 1–2	6–1–0 (1–1–0)	Riggs Field (4,737); Clemson, SC
September 19*; 7:00 p.m.	No. 1	Presbyterian	W 4–0	7–1–0	Riggs Field (1,143); Clemson, SC
September 24; 7:00 p.m.	No. 10	No. 1 Wake Forest	L 1–6	7–2–0 (1–2–0)	Riggs Field (3,744); Clemson, SC
October 3; 7:00 p.m.	No. 17	at North Carolina	W 1–0	8–2–0 (2–2–0)	Dorrance Field (1,257); Chapel Hill, NC
October 7; 8:00 p.m.	No. 23	at No. 25 Pittsburgh	T 1–1	8–2–1 (2–2–1)	Ambrose Urbanic Field (1,428); Pittsburgh, PA
October 11*; 7:00 p.m.	No. 18	No. 23 UNC Greensboro	L 1–2	8–3–1	Riggs Field (1,571); Clemson, SC
October 15; 5:30 p.m.	No. 18	Virginia	L 1–2	8–4–1 (2–3–1)	Riggs Field (2,236); Clemson, SC
October 21; 7:00 p.m.		at No. 11 Louisville	L 0–1	8–5–1 (2–4–1)	Lynn Stadium (1,013); Louisville, KY
October 24*; 7:00 p.m.		UMass	W 3–1	9–5–1	Riggs Field (1,624); Clemson, SC
October 28; 7:00 p.m.		NC State	W 3–0	10–5–1 (3–4–1)	Riggs Field (1,984); Clemson, SC
ACC Tournament
November 2; 8:00 p.m., ACCN	(8)	(9) Notre Dame; First Round	W 3–1	11–5–1	Riggs Field (1,720); Clemson, SC
November 6; 8:00 p.m., ACCN	(8)	at (1) No. 3 Duke; Quarterfinals	W 2–0	12–5–1	Koskinen Stadium (1,164); Durham, NC
November 9; 7:00 p.m., ACCN	(8) No. 18т	at (4) No. 20т Wake Forest; Semifinals	W 2–0	13–5–1	Spry Stadium (1,729); Winston-Salem, NC
November 13; Noon, ESPNU	(8) No. 18т	vs. (2) No. 3 Syracuse; Final	L 0–2	13–6–1	WakeMed Soccer Park (2,913); Cary, NC
NCAA Tournament
November 20; 6:00 p.m., ESPN+	(6) No. 18т	UCLA; Second Round	L 1–2	13–7–1	Riggs Field (1,186); Clemson, SC
*Non-conference game. ^{#}Rankings from United Soccer Coaches. (#) Tournament seedings in parentheses. All times are in Eastern.

== Goals Record ==
Rank	No.	Nat.	Po.	Name	Regular season	ACC Tournament	NCAA Tournament	Total
1	10	(Senegal)	MF	Ousmane Sylla	5	0	0	5
2	9	(Spain)	FW	Mohamed Seye	3	1	0	4
3	11	(United States)	MF	Brandon Parrish	1	2	0	3
3	26	(Italy)	FW	Macro Garcia	3	0	0	3
3	27	(United States)	FW	Isaiah Reid	3	0	0	3
6	3	(United States)	FW	Adam Lundegard	2	0	0	2
6	5	(Senegal)	DF	Hamady Diop	1	0	1	2
6	7	(Sweden)	FW	Tim Ströbeck	2	0	0	2
6	13	(United States)	DF	Joey Skinner	2	0	0	2
6	16	(United States)	MF	Derek Waleffe	0	2	0	2
6	17	(United States)	FW	Tyler Trimnal	2	0	0	2
6	29	(United States)	FW	Isaiah Easley	2	0	0	2
13	12	(United States)	DF	Enrique Montana III	1	0	0	1
13	18	(Spain)	MF	Alvaro Gomez	1	0	0	1
13	25	(United States)	MF	Nathan Richmond	1	0	0	1
Total					29	5	1	37

== Disciplinary record ==
Rank	No.	Nat.	Po.	Name	Regular Season			ACC Tournament			NCAA Tournament			Total		
Rank	No.	Nat.	Po.	Name	Booked	(yellow card) (yellow-red card)	Sent off (straight red)	Booked	(yellow card) (yellow-red card)	Sent off (straight red)	Booked	(yellow card) (yellow-red card)	Sent off (straight red)	Booked	(yellow card) (yellow-red card)	Sent off (straight red)
1	3	(United States)	DF	Adam Lundegard	3	0	0	2	0	0	0	0	0	5	0	0
2	5	(United States)	DF	Hamady Diop	1	0	1	1	0	0	0	0	0	2	1	0
2	9	(Spain)	FW	Mohamed Seye	4	0	0	0	0	0	0	0	0	4	0	0
2	10	(Senegal)	MF	Ousmane Sylla	2	0	0	2	0	0	0	0	0	4	0	0
5	8	(United States)	MF	Elton Chifamba	2	0	0	1	0	0	0	0	0	3	0	0
5	11	(United States)	MF	Brandon Parrish	1	0	0	2	0	0	0	0	0	3	0	0
5	20	(United States)	DF	Shawn Smart	3	0	0	0	0	0	0	0	0	3	0	0
8	7	(Sweden)	FW	Tim Ströbeck	2	0	0	0	0	0	0	0	0	2	0	0
8	16	(United States)	MF	Derek Waleffe	1	0	0	1	0	0	0	0	0	2	0	0
8	18	(Spain)	MF	Alvaro Gomez	2	0	0	0	0	0	0	0	0	2	0	0
8	26	(Italy)	FW	Marco Garcia	2	0	0	0	0	0	0	0	0	2	0	0
8	29	(United States)	FW	Isaiah Easley	2	0	0	0	0	0	0	0	0	2	0	0
13	6	(United States)	DF	Dylan Sullivan	0	0	0	1	0	0	0	0	0	1	0	0
13	12	(United States)	DF	Enrique Montana III	0	0	0	1	0	0	0	0	0	1	0	0
13	27	(United States)	FW	Isaiah Reid	0	0	0	1	0	0	0	0	0	1	0	0
Total					25	0	1	12	0	0	0	0	0	37	1	0

== Awards and honors ==
Recipient	Award	Date	Ref.
Mohamed Seye	Pre-Season ACC Watchlist	August 16	
Ousmane Sylla	ACC Co-offensive Player of the Week	August 30	
Ousmane Sylla	All-ACC First Team	November 9	
Hamady Diop	All-ACC Second Team	November 9	
Mohamed Seye	All-ACC Third Team	November 9	
Joseph Andema	ACC All-Freshman Team	November 9	

== 2023 MLS Super Draft ==
Clemson had the first overall pick for the second time in four drafts. No other school has had two top-five picks in the past four seasons.

Player	Team	Round	Pick #	Position
Hamady Diop	Charlotte FC	1	1	DF
Joey Skinner	Nashville SC	1	13	DF
Isaiah Reid	Houston Dynamo	2	34	FW

== Rankings ==
Ranking movements Legend: ██ Increase in ranking ██ Decrease in ranking — = Not ranked RV = Received votes т = Tied with team above or below ( ) = First-place votes
	Week																
Poll	Pre	1	2	3	4	5	6	7	8	9	10	11	12	13	14	15	Final
United Soccer	1 (8)	1 (7)	1 (6)	1 (7)	10	17	23	18	RV	—	—	18т	Not released				13
TopDrawer Soccer	1	1	1	1	7	11	11	12	22	—	—	14	12	16	18	19	20
