= 2022 NCAA Division I men's soccer tournament =

Soccer tournament

- Classification: Division I
- Teams: 48
- Matches: 47
- Site: WakeMed Soccer Park (Semifinal and Final); Cary, North Carolina
- Champions: Syracuse (1st title)
- Winning coach: Ian McIntyre (1st title)
- MVP: Nathan Opoku (Offensive); Russell Shealy (Defensive) (Syracuse)
- Broadcast: ESPN+, ESPNU

The 2022 NCAA Division I Men's Soccer Tournament was the 64th edition of the NCAA Division I men's soccer tournament, a postseason tournament to determine the national champion of the 2022 NCAA Division I men's soccer season. The tournament started on November 17 and culminated with the Men's College Cup, the semifinals and finals of the tournament, which was played on December 9 and December 12 in Cary, North Carolina.

In the championship game Syracuse defeated Indiana 2–2 (7–6 pk).

== Qualification ==
All Division I men's soccer programs are eligible to qualify for the tournament. 20 teams received automatic bids by winning their conference tournaments, 3 teams received automatic bids by claiming the conference regular season crown (the Ivy League, Pac-12 Conference, and West Coast Conference don't hold conference tournaments), and an additional 25 teams earned at-large bids based on their regular season records.

Automatic Bids
Conference	Team	Date qualified	Record	Appearance	Last bid
ACC	Syracuse	November 13	14–2–4	8th	2019
America East	New Hampshire	November 13	12–4–0	7th	2021
American (Note: FIU is a men's soccer affiliate member of The American, as its primary home of Conference USA dropped men's soccer after the 2021 season.)	FIU	November 13	13–4–1	12th (Note: 12th appearance as a Division I program. FIU qualified eight times to the NCAA Division II men's soccer tournament.)	2021
ASUN	Lipscomb	November 12	13–2–2	4th	2021
Atlantic 10	Saint Louis	November 13	11–4–1	50th	2021
Big East	Creighton	November 13	7–4–6	26th	2021
Big South	High Point	November 12	9–4–5	3rd	2020
Big Ten	Rutgers	November 13	10–4–6	18th	2015
Big West	UC Riverside	November 12	7–7–4	2nd	2005
CAA	Hofstra	November 12	13–3–3	10th	2021
Horizon	Cleveland State	November 5	9–3–5	10th	2012
Ivy	Penn	November 12	11–2–2	11th	2013
MAAC	Quinnipiac	November 12	11–4–3	2nd	2013
MAC	Western Michigan	November 12	15–1–4	3rd	2013
Missouri Valley	Missouri State	November 13	13–2–2	7th	2021
Northeast	Fairleigh Dickinson	November 13	8–5–3	18th	2019
Pac-12	Washington	November 13	15–1–3	28th	2021
Patriot	Navy	November 12	6–4–9	12th	2013
SoCon	UNC Greensboro	November 13	12–1–4	13th (Note: 13th appearance as a Division I program. UNC Greensboro qualified ten times to the NCAA Division II men's soccer tournament.)	2020
Summit	Denver	November 12	11–2–5	12th	2021
Sun Belt (Note: Kentucky is a men's soccer affiliate member of the Sun Belt Conference, as its primary conference, the SEC, does not sponsor men's soccer.)	Kentucky	November 13	14–0–5	13th	2021
West Coast	San Diego	November 13	7–4–6	16th	2014
WAC	Cal Baptist	November 13	8–6–3	1st (Note: 1st appearance and 1st year of eligibility as a Division I program. California Baptist qualified twice for each of three other national championship tournaments: the NAIA men's soccer tournament, the NCCAA Division I men's soccer tournament, and the NCAA Division II men's soccer tournament.)	None

At-Large Bids
Conference	Team	Record	Appearance	Last bid
MAC	Akron	18–2–1	31st	2021
ACC	Clemson	13–6–1	35th	2021
Ivy	Cornell	11–3–4	11th	2012
ACC	Duke	10–2–6	29th	2021
CAA	Elon	10–4–6	5th	2015
Big East	Georgetown	8–4–5	13th	2021
Big Ten	Indiana	12–4–3	47th	2021
ACC	Louisville	12–5–3	14th	2021
Sun Belt	Marshall	11–1–3	4th	2021
Big Ten	Maryland	9–3–7	40th	2021
American	Memphis	16–2–3	3rd	2009
ACC	North Carolina	11–5–4	29th	2021
Big Ten	Ohio State	7–7–5	11th	2015
Pac-12	Oregon State	15–4–1	7th	2021
ACC	Pittsburgh	14–4–2	6th	2021
West Coast	Portland	14–2–3	18th	2021
Big East	Seton Hall	10–5–3	13th	2020
American	SMU	12–4–3	34th	2019
American	South Florida	11–4–4	22nd	2019
Pac-12	Stanford	13–4–2	17th	2021
American	Tulsa	12–4–5	13th	2021
Pac-12	UCLA	11–5–2	47th	2021
America East	Vermont	14–2–4	12th	2021
ACC	Virginia	9–6–5	42nd	2019
ACC	Wake Forest	9–2–5	26th	2021

=== Seeded teams ===
The top 16 teams are seeded and earn a bye to the second round of the tournament.

Seeded teams
Seed	School	Conference	Record	Berth type	United Soccer Coaches ranking	RPI ranking
1	Kentucky	5–0–3	14–0–5	Automatic	2nd	3rd
2	Washington	7–1–2	15–1–3	Automatic	1st	2nd
3	Syracuse	5–1–2	14–2–4	Automatic	3rd	1st
4	Virginia	5–1–2	10–4–4	At-Large	11th	4th
5	Stanford	4–2–4	11–2–5	At-Large	5th	8th
6	Clemson	3–4–1	13–6–1	At-Large	18th	5th
7	Duke	5–0–3	11–1–4	At-Large	4th	6th
8	Oregon State	3–1–5	7–3–6	At-Large	RV	10th
9	Lipscomb	7–1–0	14–2–2	Automatic	12th	7th
10	FIU	6–2–1	13–4–1	Automatic	25th	9th
11	SMU	6–3–0	10–5–1	At-Large	13th	14th
12	UNC Greensboro	4–0–1	13–1–4	Automatic	7th	12th
13	Indiana	3–1–4	10–4–6	At-Large	RV	20th
14	Cornell	5–1–1	13–3–1	At-Large	16th	11th
15	Tulsa	5–3–1	9–4–2	At-Large	RV	17th
16	Akron	5–0–3	11–3–5	At-Large	15th	16th

== Bracket ==
The bracket was announced on Monday, November 14, 2022. First round games will be played on November 17 at campus sites.

=== Regional 1 ===
First Round; November 17, 2022
South Florida*	4
Hofstra	2
Pittsburgh*	2
Cleveland State	1
Louisville*	1
Western Michigan (a.e.t.)	2
Portland*	2
UC Riverside	1

Second Round; November 20, 2022
1	Kentucky*	4
South Florida	0
16	Akron*	0
Pittsburgh	3
9	Lipscomb*	0
Western Michigan	1
8	Oregon State*	0
Portland	2

Third Round; November 26–27, 2022
1	Kentucky*	1
Pittsburgh	2
Western Michigan	0
Portland*	1

Quarterfinals; December 3, 2022
Pittsburgh* (a.e.t.)	1
Portland	0

Host Institution*

=== Regional 2 ===
First Round; November 17, 2022
North Carolina*	0
High Point	2
Wake Forest*	0
Ohio State	3
Saint Louis* (a.e.t.)	4
Memphis	2
Elon*	0
Marshall	1

Second Round; November 20, 2022
5	Stanford*	6
High Point	2
12	UNC Greensboro*	1 (6)
Ohio State	1 (5)
13	Indiana*	1
Saint Louis	0
4	Virginia*	1 (3)
Marshall (p)	1 (5)

Third Round; November 27, 2022
5	Stanford*	1 (5)
12	UNC Greensboro (p)	1 (6)
13	Indiana*	1
Marshall	0

Quarterfinals; December 3, 2022
12	UNC Greensboro*	0
13	Indiana	2

Host Institution*

=== Regional 3 ===
First Round; November 17–18, 2022
Penn*	3
Rutgers	0
Maryland*	5
Fairleigh Dickinson	2
Vermont* (a.e.t.)	3
Quinnipiac	2
UCLA*	2
California Baptist	1

Second Round; November 20, 2022
3	Syracuse* (a.e.t.)	2
Penn	1
14	Cornell*	2
Maryland	1
11	SMU*	2
Vermont	3
6	Clemson*	1
UCLA	2

Third Round; November 26–27, 2022
3	Syracuse*	1
14	Cornell	0
Vermont*	3
UCLA	0

Quarterfinals; December 3, 2022
3	Syracuse*	2
Vermont	1

Host Institution*

=== Regional 4 ===
First Round; November 17–18, 2022
Denver* (a.e.t.)	1
San Diego	0
New Hampshire*	2
Seton Hall	1
Georgetown*	2
Navy	0
Creighton*	2
Missouri State	1

Second Round; November 20, 2022
7	Duke*	3
Denver	1
10	FIU* (p)	2 (10)
New Hampshire	2 (9)
15	Tulsa* (a.e.t.)	1
Georgetown	0
2	Washington*	1
Creighton	3

Third Round; November 26–27, 2022
7	Duke*	1
10	FIU	0
15	Tulsa*	1
Creighton	2

Quarterfinals; December 3, 2022
7	Duke*	2
Creighton	3

Host Institution*

=== 2022 Men's College Cup ===
Semifinals; December 9 WakeMed Soccer Park; Cary, North Carolina
Pittsburgh	0
13	Indiana	2
3	Syracuse	3
Creighton	2

Championship; December 12 @ 6:00pm EST; WakeMed Soccer Park; Cary, North Carolina
3	Syracuse	2 (7)
13	Indiana	2 (6)

== Results ==
=== First round ===
November 17, 2022	North Carolina	0–2	High Point	Chapel Hill, NC
12:00 p.m. EST	Riley Thomas (yellow card) 52'; Ahmad Al-Qaq (yellow card) 72'; Akeim Clarke (yellow card) 90'	Report	52' Jefferson Amaya; 57' Noah Holmes	Stadium: Dorrance Field; Attendance: 458; Referee: JC Griggs; Assistant referees: Tim Eller; Nicholas Seymour; Fourth official: Bryson Condrey

November 17, 2022	Georgetown	2–0	Navy	Washington, DC
12:00 p.m. EST	Jacob Murrell 57', 70'; Diego Letayf (yellow card) 83'	Report	(yellow card) 90' A. J. Schuetz	Stadium: Shaw Field; Attendance: 687; Referee: Luis Diego Arroyo; Assistant referees: Larry Urwiler Jr. Jeffrey Skinker; Fourth official: Mike De Felice

November 17, 2022	Denver	1–0 (a.e.t.)	San Diego	Denver, CO
4:00 p.m. EST	Stefan DeLeone (yellow card) 90'; Liam Johnson (yellow card) 92'; Kengo Ohira 93'	Report	(yellow card) 44' Cesar Bahena; (red card) 57' Rhys Gourdie; (yellow card) 91' Jason Dubrovich	Stadium: CIBER Field; Attendance: 194; Referee: Younes Marrakchi; Assistant referees: Brad Miller; Joti Baruni; Fourth official: Chris Greer

November 17, 2022	Creighton	2–1	Missouri State	Omaha, NE
5:00 p.m. EST	Luke Mitchell (yellow card) 14'; Jake Ashford (yellow card) 79', (goal) 83'; Alejandro Maillet 88'	Report	47' Nicolo Mulatero; (yellow card) 90' Jon Koka; (yellow card) 90' Javier Martin Gil	Stadium: Morrison Stadium; Attendance: 1,054; Referee: Dimitar Chavdarov; Assistant referees: Zachary Richter; Matthew Ryder; Fourth official: Esad Omanovic

November 17, 2022	Elon	0–1	Marshall	Elon, NC
6:00 p.m. EST	Mason Duval (yellow card) 5'	Report	44' Mohammed Seidu; (yellow card) 67' Ryan Holmes; (yellow card) 80' Adam Aoumaich	Stadium: Rudd Field; Attendance: 1,521; Referee: Carmen Serbio; Assistant referees: Kevin Uitto; Jude Carr; Fourth official: Dustin Thorne

November 17, 2022	Maryland	5–2	Fairleigh Dickinson	College Park, MD
6:00 p.m. EST	Stefan Copetti 2'; Malcolm Johnston 10'; Albi Ndrenika 26'; Colin Griffith (yellow card) 54'; Joe Suchecki 64', (yellow card) 88'; Hunter George 81'	Report	(yellow card) 49' Tony Gomez; (yellow card) 53' Fallou Tounkara; (yellow card) 54' Edoardo Calzola; (yellow card) 60' Jordan Alonge; (red card) 70' Jeffrey Marquez; 74', 88' Matt Giraldo	Stadium: Ludwig Field; Attendance: 864; Referee: Guido Gonzales; Assistant referees: A. Max Smith; Jason Blight; Fourth official: Matthew Kreitzer

November 17, 2022	New Hampshire	2–1	Seton Hall	Durham, NH
6:00 p.m. EST	Eli Goldman 4'; Bilal Kamal 9'; Yannick Bright (yellow card) 37'; Johann von Knebel (yellow card) 40'; Tola Showunmi (yellow card) 90'	Report	(yellow card) 6' Johannes Pex; 12' Konstantin Donalies; (yellow card) 35' Quenzi Huerman; (yellow card) 52' Ian Albuquerque; (yellow card) 77' J. P. Marin; (yellow card) 80' Luca Dahn	Stadium: Wildcat Stadium; Attendance: 1,523; Referee: Daniel Shenk Moreno; Assistant referees: Eric Schreiber; Jason Ayotte; Fourth official: Andrew Porada

November 17, 2022	Wake Forest	0–3	Ohio State	Winston-Salem, NC
6:00 p.m. EST	Garrison Tubbs (yellow card) 16'; Sidney Paris (yellow card) 31'	Report	2' Anthony Samways; 15' Xavier Green; (yellow card) 30', (goal) 53' Thomas Gilej; (yellow card) 53' Nathan Demian	Stadium: Spry Stadium; Attendance: 701; Referee: Jonathan Bilinski; Assistant referees: Rick Rogers; Brandon Marion; Fourth official: Justin Howard

November 17, 2022	South Florida	4–2	Hofstra	Tampa, FL
7:00 p.m. EST	Ajmeer Spengler 29'; Oscar Resano 45'; Marcus Victorio 54'; Chris Lee (yellow card) 55'; Shion Soga 61'; Sergio Pineros-Mayorga (yellow card) 84'	Report	5', 78' Eliot Goldthorp; (yellow card) 55' Nico Oberrauch; (yellow card) 58' Francesco Perinelli; (yellow card) 69' Roc Carles; (yellow card) 83' Ryan Carmichael	Stadium: Corbett Stadium; Attendance: 1,321; Referee: Jonathan Weiner; Kendall McCardell; Fourth official: Daniel Gutierrez

November 17, 2022	Pittsburgh	2–1	Cleveland State	Pittsburgh, PA
7:00 p.m. EST	Bertin Jacquesson 28', 77'	Report	(yellow card) 28' Ryan Kolonick; 89' Hector Gomez	Stadium: Ambrose Urbanic Field; Attendance: 659; Referee: Sergio Gonzalez; Assistant referees: Lucas Feathers; Erik Blackbrun; Fourth official: John Woodruff

November 17, 2022	Louisville	1–2 (a.e.t.)	Western Michigan	Louisville, KY
7:00 p.m. EST	Ugo Achara (yellow card) 17'; Josh Jones (yellow card) 81'; Aboubacar Camara 83'; Bryce Lebel (yellow card) 96'; Konstantinos Georgallides (yellow card) 101'; Matt Walters (yellow card) 104'	Report	59' Dylan Sing; 93' Charlie Sharp	Stadium: Dr. Mark & Cindy Lynn Stadium; Attendance: 307; Referee: Sorin Stoica; Assistant referees: Cory Richardson; Noah Matos; Fourth official: Tyler Metcalf

November 17, 2022	Penn	3–0	Rutgers	Philadelphia, PA
7:00 p.m. EST	Ben Stitz 2', 70'; Stas Korzeniowski 31'	Report	(yellow card) 41' Ian Abbey; (yellow card) 52' Joey Zalinsky; (yellow card) 81' Matthew Acosta	Stadium: Penn Park; Attendance: 773; Referee: Shaun Papperman; Assistant referees: Geoff Spector; Zak Elabid; Fourth official: Aran Hart

November 17, 2022	Vermont	3–2 (a.e.t.)	Quinnipiac	Burlington, VT
7:00 p.m. EST	Max Murray 5'; Sebastian Gebhart (yellow card) 55'; Noah Egan 75'; Adri Schulze Solano (yellow card) 88'; Alex Nagy 108'	Report	(yellow card) 35' Luke Allen; 41' Brage Aasen; (yellow card) 58' Sander Sonsterud; (yellow card) 61' Alex Holle; 73' Tomas Svecula; (yellow card) 109' Jason Budhai	Stadium: Virtue Field; Attendance: 969; Referee: Bruno Mozzo; Assistant referees: Thomas Felice; John Jordan; Fourth official: Gunther Sihier

November 17, 2022	Saint Louis	4–2 (a.e.t.)	Memphis	St. Louis, MO
8:00 p.m. EST	Seth Anderson 42'; Colin Welsh (yellow card) 76'; Alberto Suárez 76'; Enzo Okpoye 95'; Jack Mika 108'	Report	(yellow card) 12', (goal) 79' Bryce Meredith; 23', (yellow card) 66' Eric Primo	Stadium: Hermann Stadium; Attendance: 725; Referee: Calin Radosav; Assistant referees: Eulogio Villalpando; Daniel Ortega; Fourth official: Don Tebeau

November 17, 2022	UCLA	2–1	California Baptist	Los Angeles, CA
8:00 p.m. EST	Jose Contell 9'; Tommy Silva (yellow card) 44'; Kevin Diaz 69'; Grayson Doody (yellow card) 83'; Tarun Karumanchi (yellow card) 85'	Report	7', (yellow card) 82' Luis Mueller; (yellow card) 85' Thomas Beecham; (yellow card) 90' Georg Bjarnason	Stadium: Wallis Annenberg Stadium; Attendance: 881; Referee: Bernard Hosu; Assistant referees: Frank Anderson; Ivan de Cristofaro; Fourth official: Irving Navarro

November 17, 2022	Portland	2–1	UC Riverside	Portland, OR
10:00 p.m. EST	Jacob Babalai 17'; Jake Arteaga (yellow card) 36'; Delentz Pierre (yellow card) 45'; Gurman Sangha 47'; Deryk Jones Jr. (yellow card) 90'	Report	(yellow card) 47' Adrian Meade-Tatum; (yellow card) 86' Luka Lukić; 89' Aleksandar Vuković; (yellow card) 90' Christian Ceja	Stadium: Merlo Field; Attendance: 1,009; Referee: Corbyn May; Assistant referees: Chad Steward; Bryan Juarez; Fourth official: Mike Hohnholz

=== Second round ===
November 20, 2022	(13) Indiana	1–0	Saint Louis	Bloomington, IN
12:00 p.m. EST	Brett Bebej (yellow card) 59'; Ryan Wittenbrink 75'	Report		Stadium: Bill Armstrong Stadium; Attendance: 1,171; Referee: Eric Tattersall; Assistant referees: Christopher Schufranz; Joshua Brooks; Fourth official: Chad Collins

November 20, 2022	(4) Virginia	1–1 (a.e.t.) (3–5 p)	Marshall	Charlottesville, VA
1:00 p.m. EST	Reese Miller (yellow card) 15'; Philip Horton 28'; Albin Gashi (yellow card) 64'; Michael Tsicoulias (yellow card) 73'; Jeremy Verley (yellow card) 87'	Report	(yellow card) 17' João Souza; (yellow card) 25' Gabriel Alves; (yellow card) 49' Taimu Okiyoshi; (yellow card) 51' Adam Aoumaich; 66' Matthew Bell	Stadium: Klöckner Stadium; Attendance: 870; Referee: Stephen Foster; Assistant referees: Nicholas Seymour; Jeremy L.B. Smith; Fourth official: Otto Leon
	Penalties
	Daniel Mangarov (penalty missed); Philip Horton (penalty scored); Axel Ahlander (penalty scored); Andreas Ueland (penalty scored)		(penalty scored) Oliver Semmle; (penalty scored) Gabriel Alves; (penalty scored) Matthew Bell; (penalty scored) João Souza; (penalty scored) Milo Yosef

November 20, 2022	(7) Duke	3–1	Denver	Durham, NC
1:00 p.m. EST	Peter Stroud 6', (yellow card) 8'; Shak Mohammed 16', (yellow card) 76'; Kamran Acito 65'; Wayne Frederick (yellow card) 89'	Report	(yellow card) 6' Isaac Nehme; (yellow card) 8' Griffin Meyer; 34' Holger Olsson; (yellow card) 42' Lukas Fisher; (yellow card) 85' Liam Johnson	Stadium: Koskinen Stadium; Attendance: 637; Referee: David Erbacher; Assistant referees: Rick Rogers; Benjamin Wooten; Fourth official: Mark Kadlecik

November 20, 2022	(16) Akron	0–3	Pittsburgh	Akron, OH
1:00 p.m. EST	Josh Hallenberger (yellow card) 34'; Ashton Kamdem (yellow card) 48'; Johnny Fitzgerald (yellow card) 48'; Malik Henry (yellow card) 50'; Santiago Frias (yellow card) 87'	Report	8', 48' Valentin Noël; (yellow card) 58' Josh Luchini; (yellow card) 63' Jackson Gilman; 66' Luis Sahmkow	Stadium: FirstEnergy Stadium–Cub Cadet Field; Attendance: 586; Referee: Nicholas Balcer; Assistant referees: Michael Nickerson; Jacob Little; Fourth official: Carter Brochu

November 20, 2022	(3) Syracuse	2–1 (a.e.t.)	Penn	Syracuse, NY
2:00 p.m. EST	Christian Curti (yellow card) 10'; Nathan Opoku 60'; Amferny Sinclair (yellow card) 78'; Levonte Johnson 92'	Report	53' Nick Schimbeno	Stadium: SU Soccer Stadium; Attendance: 595; Referee: Sorin Stoica; Assistant referees: Raymond Tam; Jefferson Dargout; Fourth official: Stephen Montanino

November 20, 2022	(14) Cornell	2–1	Maryland	Ithaca, NY
2:00 p.m. EST	Nick Allen (yellow card) 33'; Henry Hylbert (yellow card) 65'; Danny Lokko 84', 87'	Report	(yellow card) 85', (goal) 88' Albi Ndrenika	Stadium: Charles F. Berman Field; Attendance: 782; Referee: Thomas Snyder; Assistant referees: Justen Lopez; Ankur Singh; Fourth official: Jason Weischedel

November 20, 2022	(9) Lipscomb	0–1	Western Michigan	Nashville, TN
3:00 p.m. EST	Adam McAleenan (yellow card) 26'	Report	(yellow card) 41' Dylan Sing; 71' Daniel Nimick	Stadium: Lipscomb Soccer Complex; Attendance: 757; Referee: Leeland Grant; Assistant referees: Dean Morgan; Wes Caouette; Fourth official: Benjamin Meyer

November 20, 2022	(1) Kentucky	4–0	South Florida	Lexington, KY
6:00 p.m. EST	Martin Soereide 27'; Casper Grening 65'; Clay Holstad 74'; Max Miller 78'	Report		Stadium: Bell Soccer Complex; Attendance: 1,182; Referee: Nikola Aleksic; Assistant referees: Kyle Maust; Stephen Milhoan; Fourth official: Mikael Lundqvist

November 20, 2022	(6) Clemson	1–2	UCLA	Clemson, SC
6:00 p.m. EST	Hamady Diop 23'	Report	31' Andre Ochoa; (yellow card) 57' Cam Wilkerson; (yellow card) 64' Jose Sosa; 79' Tucker Lepley	Stadium: Riggs Field; Attendance: 1,186; Referee: Matthew Thompson; Assistant referees: Chris Zuerner; Jarred Mosher; Fourth official: Ben Ellis

November 20, 2022	(10) FIU	2–2 (a.e.t.) (10–9 p)	New Hampshire	Miami, FL
6:00 p.m. EST	Rasmus Tobinski 14'; Chris Pinkham 96' (o.g.)	Report	65' (o.g.) Carlos Scheckermann; 108' Rory O'Driscoll	Stadium: FIU Soccer Stadium; Attendance: 492
	Penalties
	Rasmus Tobinski (penalty missed); Julian Hodek (penalty scored); Andrew Bennett (penalty scored); David Garcia (penalty scored); Edgar Aguilar (penalty scored); Yushi Nagao (penalty scored); Bernardo dos Santos (penalty scored); Carlos Scheckermann (penalty scored); Paulo Alves (penalty scored); Matteo Gasperoni (penalty missed); David Garcia (penalty scored); Carlos Scheckermann (penalty scored)		(penalty missed) Moise Bombito; (penalty scored) Chris Pinkham; (penalty scored) Nils Buchwalder; (penalty scored) Rory O'Driscoll; (penalty scored) Yannick Bright; (penalty scored) Tola Showunmi; (penalty scored) Bilal Kamal; (penalty scored) Liam Bennett; (penalty scored) Jamie Davis; (penalty missed) Johann Knebel; (penalty scored) Rory O'Driscoll; (penalty missed) Nils Buchwalder

November 20, 2022	(12) UNC Greensboro	1–1 (a.e.t.) (5–4 p)	Ohio State	Greensboro, NC
6:00 p.m. EST	Ismail El Harchi 77'; Maddox Mallery (yellow card) 100'	Report	(yellow card) 76' Marko Borkovic; 81' Parker Grinstead; (yellow card) 85' Thomas Gilej; (yellow card) 111' Reed Davis	Stadium: UNCG Soccer Stadium; Attendance: 1,596; Referee: Dimitar Chavdarov; Assistant referees: Robert Dail; Jude Carr; Fourth official: Kevin Maurer
	Penalties
	Basile Marc (penalty scored); Ethan Conley (penalty scored); Marco Afonso (penalty missed); Jack Birch (penalty scored); Yoshiya Okawa (penalty scored); Emmanuel Hagan (penalty scored); Maddox Mallery (penalty scored)		(penalty scored) Laurence Wootton; (penalty scored) Parker Grinstead; (penalty missed) Deylen Vellios; (penalty scored) Thomas Gilej; (penalty scored) Reed Davis; (penalty scored) Marko Borkovic; (penalty missed) Owen Sullivan

November 20, 2022	(15) Tulsa	1–0 (a.e.t.)	Georgetown	Tulsa, OK
7:00 p.m. EST	Mariano Fazio (yellow card) 56'; Will Edwards (yellow card) 85'; Luke Jeffus 93'	Report	(yellow card) 36' Maximus Jennings; (yellow card) 49' Kenny Nielsen; (yellow card) 102' Kieran Sargeant; (red card) 110' Marlon Tabora	Stadium: Hurricane Soccer & Track Stadium; Attendance: 513; Referee: Lorenzo Hernandez; Assistant referees: Matt Trotter; Roy Robinson; Fourth official: Brook Weiss

November 20, 2022	(2) Washington	1–3	Creighton	Seattle, WA
8:00 p.m. EST	Kalani Kossa-Rienzi 10', (yellow card) 37'; Ilijah Paul (yellow card) 75'	Report	(yellow card) 15' Jake Ashford; 21' Owen O'Malley; 84', 86' Duncan McGuire	Stadium: Husky Soccer Stadium; Attendance: 2,261; Referee: Josh Wilkens; Assistant referees: Christian Clerc; Bryan Juarez; Fourth official: Jaclyn Metz

November 20, 2022	(5) Stanford	6–2	High Point	Stanford, CA
8:00 p.m. EST	Carlo Agostinelli 3', 17'; Shane de Flores 23', (yellow card) 67'; Keegan Hughes 35'; Liam Doyle 72'; Zach Bohane 81'	Report	51', 90' Sebastian Chalbaud; (yellow card) 61' Jefferson Amaya; (yellow card) 72' LaLas Ayertay	Stadium: Laird Q. Cagan Stadium; Attendance: 1,229; Referee: Michael Zapata; Assistant referees: Peter Hanson; Sergiu Iordachi; Fourth official: Krzysztof Rogala

November 20, 2022	(11) SMU	2–3	Vermont	University Park, TX
8:00 p.m. EST	Alexander Petraeus 5'; Nikola Đorđević (yellow card) 20'; Bailey Sparks 32'; J. P. Jordan (yellow card) 83'	Report	(yellow card) 27'Yves Borie; 65', 80' Max Murray; (yellow card) 81' Daniel Pacella; 86' Garrett Lillie; (yellow card) 90' Matt Black	Stadium: Washburne Soccer and Track Stadium; Attendance: 950; Referee: Daniel Radford; Assistant referees: Joel Mckell; Fevzi Demirhan; Fourth official: Habeeb Hooshmand

November 20, 2022	(8) Oregon State	0–2	Portland	Corvallis, OR
9:00 p.m. EST	Adria Capdevila (yellow card) 44'; Clarence Awoudor (yellow card) 90'	Report	78' Jacob Babalai; 89' Muslim Umar	Stadium: Patrick Wayne Valley Stadium; Attendance: 1,419; Referee: Raymond Moffatte Jr. Assistant referees: Ryan Jung; CJ Kroll; Fourth official: Jason Perlewitz

=== Third round ===
November 26, 2022	(15) Tulsa	1–2	Creighton	Tulsa, OK
7:00 p.m. EST	Alex Meinhard 23'; John Dalby (yellow card) 79'	Report	(yellow card) 36' Callum Watson; (yellow card) 43' Luke Mitchell; 54' Mark O'Neill; (yellow card) 58' Charles Auguste; (yellow card) 81' Jake Ashford; 88' Giorgio Probo	Stadium: Hurricane Track and Soccer Stadium; Attendance: 540; Referee: Brandon Gardner; Assistant referees: Seth Barton; Matt Trotter; Fourth official: Andre Figueirdo

November 26, 2022	Vermont	3–0	UCLA	Burlington, VT
7:00 p.m. EST	Yaniv Bazini 56', (yellow card) 82'; Yves Borie 70'; Alex Nagy 86'	Report	(yellow card) 79' Andre Ochoa; (yellow card) 81' Jose Contell	Stadium: Virtue Field; Attendance: 2,500; Referee: Jeremy Scheer; Assistant referees: Justen Lopez; Jessica Carnevale; Fourth official: Andrew Porada

November 26, 2022	Portland	1–0	Western Michigan	Portland, OR
8:00 p.m. EST	Delentz Pierre 59'	Report	(yellow card) 89' Mike Melaragni; (yellow card) 89' Eric Conerty	Stadium: Merlo Field; Attendance: 1,862; Referee: Will Niccolls; Assistant referees: JJ Blodgett; Eric Krueger; Fourth official: Mohammed Shakibnia

November 27, 2022	(3) Syracuse	1–0	(14) Cornell	Syracuse, NY
2:00 p.m. EST	Giona Leibold 83'	Report	(yellow card) 55' Nick Allen; (yellow card) 58' Brandon Morales	Stadium: SU Soccer Stadium; Attendance: 620; Referee: Guido Gonzales; Assistant referees: Alexandru Focea; Hao Zhong; Fourth official: Jordan Cavaco

November 27, 2022	(7) Duke	1–0	(10) FIU	Durham, NC
3:00 p.m. EST	Scotty Taylor 42'; Kenan Hot (yellow card) 68'	Report	(yellow card) 10' Matteo Gasperoni; (yellow card) 72' Edgar Aguilar; (yellow card) 73' Stephen Afrifa; (yellow card) 86' Carlos Scheckermann	Stadium: Koskinen Stadium; Attendance: 572; Referee: JC Griggs; Assistant referees: Robert Dail; Jude Carr; Fourth official: Brandon Marion

November 27, 2022	(1) Kentucky	1–2	Pittsburgh	Lexington, KY
6:00 p.m. EST	Casper Grening 52'	Report	54' Valentin Noël; (red card) 79' Henrique Gallina; 87' Bertin Jacquesson	Stadium: Bell Soccer Complex; Attendance: 1,708; Referee: Eric Tattersall; Assistant referees: Cory Richardson; Zachary McWhorter; Fourth official: Youssef Elmessoussi

November 27, 2022	(13) Indiana	1–0	Marshall	Bloomington, IN
6:30 p.m. EST	Herbert Endeley (yellow card) 17'; Brett Bebej 47'; Maouloune Goumballe (yellow card) 68'	Report	(yellow card) 26' Morris Duggan; (yellow card) 73' Mohammed Seidu; (yellow card) 76' Collin Mocyunas	Stadium: Bill Armstrong Stadium; Attendance: 2,161; Referee: Calin Radosav; Assistant referees: Andrew Bigelow; Matthew Rodman; Fourth official: Matthew Geringer

November 27, 2022	(5) Stanford	1–1 (a.e.t.) (1–3 p)	(12) UNC Greensboro	Stanford, CA
8:00 p.m. EST	Cam Cilley 26', (yellow card) 39'; Will Cleary (yellow card) 109'	Report	21' Marco Afonso; (yellow card) 44' Colton Sessoms; (yellow card) 72' Ismail El Harchi	Stadium: Cagan Stadium; Attendance: 1,393; Referee: Frank Anderson; Assistant referees: Peter Hanson; Sergiu Iordachi; Fourth official: Alex Del Angel
	Penalties
	Carlo Agostinelli (penalty missed); Will Reilly (penalty missed); Cam Cilley (penalty missed); Connor Evans (penalty scored)		(penalty scored) Basile Marc; (penalty missed) Jack Birch; (penalty scored) Ethan Conley; (penalty scored) Emmanuel Hagan

=== Quarterfinals ===
December 3, 2022	(7) Duke	2–3	Creighton	Durham, NC
1:00 p.m. EST	Axel Gudbjornsson 29'; Luke Mitchell 75' (o.g.)	Report	17' Duncan McGuire; 43' Jackson Castro; 45' Charles Auguste; (yellow card) 65' Mark O'Neill; (yellow card) 76' Luke Mitchell; (yellow card) 87' Giorgio Probo	Stadium: Koskinen Stadium; Attendance: 1,061; Referee: Elvis Osmanović; Assistant referees: Nicholas Seymour; Justin Howard; Fourth official: Eric Usher

December 3, 2022	Pittsburgh	1–0 (a.e.t.)	Portland	Pittsburgh, PA
1:00 p.m. EST	Jay Vidovich (yellow card) 72'; Valentin Noël 104', (yellow card) 105'; Luis Sahmkow (yellow card) 105'; Filip Mirković (yellow card) 105'; Mateo Maillefaud (yellow card) 106'	Report	(yellow card) 55' George Tasouris; (yellow card) 70' Buba Fofanah; (yellow card) 73' Gurman Sangha; (yellow card) 82' Nicholas Denley	Stadium: Ambrose Urbanic Field; Attendance: 2,200; Referee: Daniel Radford; Assistant referees: Michael Nickerson; Jeffery Skinner; Fourth official: Lucas Feathers

December 3, 2022	(3) Syracuse	2–1	Vermont	Syracuse, NY
2:00 p.m. EST	Giona Leibold (yellow card) 9'; Curt Calov 11'; Levonte Johnson 42'; Amferny Sinclair (yellow card) 82'	Report	(yellow card) 10' Garrett Lillie; 23', (yellow card) 51' Daniel Pacella; (yellow card) 27' Zach Barrett; (yellow card) 67' Noah Egan; (yellow card) 73' Ymir Mar Geirsson; (red card) 90' Noe Coutiño	Stadium: SU Soccer Stadium; Attendance: 1,762; Referee: Thomas Snyder; Assistant referees: Raymond Tam; Jason Dizek; Fourth official: Ankur Singh

December 3, 2022	(12) UNC Greensboro	0–2	(13) Indiana	Greensboro, NC
5:00 p.m. EST	Emmanuel Hagan (yellow card) 27'; Jack Birch (yellow card) 90'	Report	16' Maouloune Goumballe; 64', (yellow card) 64' Samuel Sarver; (yellow card) 67' Jack Wagoner	Stadium: UNCG Soccer Stadium; Attendance: 3,622; Referee: Jose Carlos Rivero; Assistant referees: Rick Rogers; Jude Carr; Fourth official: Carmen Serbio

=== Men's College Cup Semifinals ===
December 9, 2022	(3) Syracuse	3–2	Creighton	Cary, NC
6:00 p.m. EST	Christian Curti 37'; Nathan Opoku 51'; Levonte Johnson 86'; Noah Singelmann (yellow card) 87'	Report	50' Duncan McGuire; (yellow card) 58' Giorgio Probo; 64' Alfie Pope; (yellow card) 86' Luke Mitchell; (yellow card) 87' Charles Auguste	Stadium: WakeMed Soccer Park; Referee: Dimitar Chavdarov; Assistant referees: Salma Perez; Albert Escovar; Fourth official: Brandon Marion

December 9, 2022	(13) Indiana	2–0	Pittsburgh	Cary, NC
8:30 p.m. EST	Ryan Wittenbrink 14'; Tommy Mihalic 45'; Ben Yeagley (yellow card) 55'	Report	(yellow card) 21' Jackson Walti	Stadium: WakeMed Soccer Park; Attendance: 10,286; Referee: David Erbacher; Assistant referees: Meghan Mullen; Jeremy Smith; Fourth official: Brandon Marion

=== Men's College Cup Final ===
December 12, 2022	(13) Indiana	2–2 (a.e.t.) (6–7 p)	(3) Syracuse	Cary, NC
6:00 p.m. EST	Patrick McDonald 32'; Herbert Endeley 80'; Jack Wagoner (yellow card) 90'; Joey Maher (yellow card) 98'	Report	(yellow card) 17' Abdi Salim; 24' Nathan Opoku; 33' Curt Calov; (yellow card) 35' Amferny Sinclair	Stadium: WakeMed Soccer Park; Attendance: 4,010; Referee: Matt Thompson; Assistant referees: Salma Perez; Albert Escovar; Fourth official: Dimitar Chavdarov
	Penalties
	Ryan Wittenbrink (penalty scored); Karsen Henderlong (penalty missed); Tommy Mihalic (penalty scored); Samuel Sarver (penalty scored); Joey Maher (penalty scored); Luka Bezerra (penalty scored); Quinten Helmer (penalty scored); Maouloune Goumballe (penalty missed)		(penalty scored) Lorenzo Boselli; (penalty missed) Jeorgio Kocevski; (penalty scored) Curt Calov; (penalty scored) Noah Singelmann; (penalty scored) Colin Biros; (penalty scored) Julius Rauch; (penalty scored) Levonte Johnson; (penalty scored) Amferny Sinclair

== Records by conference ==
Conference	Bids	Record	Pct.	R32	R16	E8	F4	CG	NC
ACC	8	10–6–2	.611	5	3	3	2	1	1
Big Ten	4	6–2–2	.700	3	1	1	1	1	–
Big East	3	5–3–0	.625	2	1	1	1	–	–
America East	2	4–1–1	.750	2	1	1	–	–	–
WCC	2	3–2–0	.600	1	1	1	–	–	–
SoCon	1	0–1–2	.333	1	1	1	–	–	–
Sun Belt	2	2–2–1	.500	2	2	–	–	–	–
Pac-12	4	3–3–1	.500	4	2	–	–	–	–
American	5	2–5–1	.313	4	2	–	–	–	–
Ivy	2	2–2–0	.500	2	1	–	–	–	–
MAC	2	2–2–0	.500	2	1	–	–	–	–
Atlantic 10	1	1–1–0	.500	1	–	–	–	–	–
ASUN	1	1–1–0	.500	1	–	–	–	–	–
Big South	1	1–1–0	.500	1	–	–	–	–	–
Summit	1	1–1–0	.500	1	–	–	–	–	–
CAA	2	0–2–0	.000	–	–	–	–	–	–
Others	7	0–7–0	.000	–	–	–	–	–	–

- The R32, S16, E8, F4, CG, and NC columns indicate how many teams from each conference were in the Round of 32 (second round), Round of 16 (third round), Quarterfinals (Elite Eight), Semifinals (Final Four), Championship Game, and National Champion, respectively.
- The following conferences failed to place a team into the round of 32: Big West, Horizon, MAAC, Missouri Valley, Northeast, Patriot, and WAC. The conference's records have been consolidated in the other row.

== Statistics ==
=== Goalscorers ===
There were 141 goals scored in 47 matches, for an average of 3 goals per match.

4 goals

- (United States) Duncan McGuire – Creighton
- (France) Valentin Noël – Pittsburgh

3 goals

- (France) Bertin Jacquesson – Pittsburgh
- (Canada) Levonte Johnson – Syracuse
- (Ghana) Nathan Opoku – Syracuse
- (United States) Max Murray – Vermont

2 goals

- (England) Danny Lokko – Cornell
- (United States) Mark O'Neill – Creighton
- (United States) Matt Giraldo – Fairleigh Dickinson
- (United States) Jacob Murrell – Georgetown
- (Venezuela) Sebastian Chalbaud – High Point
- (England) Eliot Goldthorp – Hofstra
- (United States) Ryan Wittenbrink – Indiana
- (Denmark) Casper Grening – Kentucky
- (United States) Albi Ndrenika – Maryland
- (United States) Ben Stitz – Penn
- (United States) Jacob Babalai – Portland
- (France) Carlo Agostinelli – Stanford
- (United States) Curt Calov – Syracuse
- (United States) Alex Nagy – Vermont

1 goal

- (Germany) Luis Mueller – California Baptist
- (United States) Hector Gomez – Cleveland State
- (United States) Jake Ashford – Creighton
- (Haiti) Charles Auguste – Creighton
- (United States) Jackson Castro – Creighton
- (Denmark) Alejandro Maillet – Creighton
- (United States) Owen O'Malley – Creighton
- (England) Alfie Pope – Creighton
- (Italy) Giorgio Probo – Creighton
- (Senegal) Hamady Diop – Clemson
- (Japan) Kengo Ohira – Denver
- (Sweden) Holger Olsson – Denver
- (United States) Kamran Acito – Duke
- (Iceland) Axel Gudbjornsson – Duke
- (Ghana) Shak Mohammed – Duke
- (United States) Peter Stroud – Duke
- (Germany) Rasmus Tobinski – FIU
- (United States) Jefferson Amaya – High Point
- (United States) Noah Holmes – High Point
- (United States) Brett Bebej – Indiana
- (United States) Herbert Endeley – Indiana
- (United States) Maouloune Goumballe – Indiana
- (United States) Patrick McDonald – Indiana
- (United States) Tommy Mihalic – Indiana
- (United States) Samuel Sarver – Indiana
- (United States) Clay Holstad – Kentucky
- (United States) Max Miller – Kentucky
- (Norway) Martin Søreide – Kentucky
- (United States) Aboubacar Camara – Louisville
- (Jamaica) Matthew Bell – Marshall
- (Ghana) Mohammed Seidu – Marshall
- (Canada) Stefan Copetti – Maryland
- (United States) Hunter George – Maryland
- (Canada) Malcolm Johnston – Maryland
- (United States) Joe Suchecki – Maryland
- (Italy) Nicolo Mulatero – Missouri State
- (United States) Bryce Meredith – Memphis
- (Spain) Éric Primo – Memphis
- (United States) Eli Goldman – New Hampshire
- (England) Bilal Kamal – New Hampshire
- (United States) Rory O'Driscoll – New Hampshire
- (Germany) Thomas Gilej – Ohio State
- (New Zealand) Xavier Green – Ohio State
- (United States) Parker Grinstead – Ohio State
- (United States) Anthony Samways – Ohio State
- (Poland) Stas Korzeniowski – Penn
- (United States) Nick Schimbeno – Penn
- (United States) Luis Sahmkow – Pittsburgh
- (Haiti) Delentz Pierre – Portland
- (Canada) Gurman Sangha – Portland
- (Nigeria) Muslim Umar – Portland
- (Norway) Brage Aasen – Quinnipiac
- (Slovakia) Tomáš Svečula – Quinnipiac
- (United States) Seth Anderson – Saint Louis
- (United States) Jack Mika – Saint Louis
- (Nigeria) Enzo Okpoye – Saint Louis
- (Spain) Alberto Suárez– Saint Louis
- (Germany) Konstantin Donalies – Seton Hall
- (Denmark) Alexander Petraeus – SMU
- (United States) Bailey Sparks – SMU
- (Mexico) Oscar Resano – South Florida
- (Japan) Shion Soga – South Florida
- (United States) Ajmeer Spengler – South Florida
- (Norway) Marcus Victorio – South Florida
- (United States) Zach Bohane – Stanford
- (United States) Cam Cilley – Stanford
- (United States) Shane de Flores – Stanford
- (Hong Kong) Liam Doyle – Stanford
- (United States) Keegan Hughes – Stanford
- (Canada) Christian Curti – Syracuse
- (Germany) Giona Leibold – Syracuse
- (United States) Luke Jeffus – Tulsa
- (Estonia) Alex Meinhard – Tulsa
- (Spain) Jose Contell – UCLA
- (United States) Kevin Diaz – UCLA
- (United States) Tucker Lepley – UCLA
- (United States) Andre Ochoa – UCLA
- (Serbia) Aleksandar Vuković – UC Riverside
- (South Africa) Marco Afonso – UNC Greensboro
- (Morocco) Ismail El Harchi – UNC Greensboro
- (Israel) Yaniv Bazini – Vermont
- (Germany) Yves Borie – Vermont
- (United States) Noah Egan – Vermont
- (United States) Garrett Lillie – Vermont
- (Canada) Daniel Pacella – Vermont
- (United States) Philip Horton – Virginia
- (United States) Kalani Kossa-Rienzi – Washington
- (Canada) Daniel Nimick – Western Michigan
- (United States) Charlie Sharp – Western Michigan
- (United States) Dylan Sing – Western Michigan

== See also ==
- 2022 NCAA Division I women's soccer tournament
