= 2022 Pittsburgh Panthers men's soccer team =

American college soccer season

2022 Pittsburgh Panthers men's soccer

NCAA Tournament, Semifinals
- Conference: Atlantic Coast Conference
- U. Soc. Coaches poll: No. 8
- TopDrawerSoccer.com: No. 4
- Record: 12–5–5 (3–2–3 ACC)
- Head coach: Jay Vidovich (7th season)
- Assistant coaches: Michael Behonick (7th season); Bryce Cregan (1st season)
- Home stadium: Ambrose Urbanic Field

2022 ACC men's soccer standings
	Conf.					Overall
Team	W		L		T	W		L		T
Atlantic
No. 1 Syracuse ‡	5	–	1	–	2	18	–	2	–	5
No. 24 Wake Forest +	5	–	3	–	0	14	–	6	–	0
Louisville +	4	–	3	–	1	9	–	6	–	3
No. 13 Clemson +	3	–	4	–	1	13	–	7	–	1
Boston College	1	–	4	–	3	4	–	7	–	5
NC State	1	–	5	–	2	6	–	7	–	5
Coastal
No. 3 Duke +	5	–	0	–	3	13	–	2	–	4
No. 16 Virginia +	5	–	1	–	2	10	–	4	–	5
No. 8 Pittsburgh +	3	–	2	–	3	12	–	5	–	5
North Carolina +	2	–	2	–	4	8	–	6	–	5
Notre Dame	3	–	4	–	1	8	–	7	–	2
Virginia Tech	0	–	8	–	0	3	–	14	–	1
‡ – ACC Tournament champion + – Also invited to the 2022 NCAA tournament; As of December 13, 2022; Rankings from United Soccer Coaches; Source: The ACC

The 2022 Pittsburgh Panthers men's soccer team represented the University of Pittsburgh during the 2022 NCAA Division I men's soccer season. The Panthers were led by head coach Jay Vidovich, in his seventh season. They played home games at Ambrose Urbanic Field. This was the team's 69th season playing organized men's college soccer and their 10th playing in the Atlantic Coast Conference.

The Panthers finished the season 12–5–5 overall and 3–2–3 in ACC play to finish in third place in the Coastal Division. As the sixth overall seed in the ACC Tournament, they defeated eleventh seed NC State in the first round before losing to third seed Virginia in the Quarterfinals. They received an at-large bid to the NCAA Tournament and were an unseeded team. They defeated Cleveland State in the First Round, Akron in the Second Round, first overall seed Kentucky in the Third Round, and Portland in the Quarterfinals to make the College Cup. There they lost to Indiana to end their season.

== Background ==
The Panthers finished the season 13–5–2 overall and 5–2–1 in ACC play to finish in a tie for first place in the Coastal Division. They won a tiebreaker with Duke to be awarded the first overall seed in the ACC Tournament. They earned a bye into the Quarterfinals where they defeated Virginia Tech before losing to eventual champions Notre Dame in the Semifinals. They received an at-large bid to the NCAA Tournament and were awarded the fifth overall seed. After a First Round bye, they defeated Northern Illinois in the Second Round and Hofstra in the Third Round before losing to Notre Dame on penalties to end their season.

== Player movement ==
=== Players leaving ===
Departures
Name	Number	Pos.	Height	Weight	Year	Hometown	Reason for departure
Nico Campuzano	0	GK	6'2"	182	Graduate Student	Cantabria, Spain	Graduated
Jasper Löeffelsend	2	DF	5'5"	146	Graduate Student	Cologne, Germany	Drafted 81st overall in the 2022 MLS SuperDraft
Raphaël Crivello	3	DF	5'9"	165	Junior	Bordeaux, France	Transferred to UCF
Arturo Ordoñez	5	DF	6'2"	174	Senior	Salou, Spain	Graduated; Drafted 39th overall in the 2022 MLS SuperDraft
Alexander Dexter	13	FW	5'8"	150	Graduate Student	Brooklyn, New York	Graduated
Sito Sena	14	DF	5'11"	177	Graduate Student	Valencia, Spain	Graduated
Lucas Mort	15	FW	5'10"	152	(redshirt) Sophomore	Greensburg, Pennsylvania	—
Soshun Shigaki	18	MF	5'5"	157	Sophomore	Tokyo, Japan	—
Veljko Petković	19	MF	5'10"	164	Junior	Queens, New York	Left the University
Matt Bailey	20	MF	5'7"	145	Graduate Student	Kent Island, Maryland	Graduated
Max Brown	22	DF	6'2"	186	Freshman	Aurora, Ohio	Transferred to Cleveland State
Cade Hagan	23	FW	5'11"	175	Freshman	Chicago, Illinois	Transferred to DePaul
Anthony Harding	27	DF	5'11"	165	(redshirt) Junior	North Huntingdon, Pennsylvania	Transferred to Duquesne
Louis Spicer	28	MF	5'10"	168	(redshirt) Sophomore	Cambridge, England	—

=== Players arriving ===
==== Incoming transfers ====
Incoming transfers
Name	Number	Pos.	Height	Weight	Year	Hometown	Previous school
Yanis Leerman	5	DF	6'2"	175	Graduate Student	Troyes, France	UCF
Ideal Shefqeti	15	MF	6'0"	178	Graduate Student	Lignano Sabbiadoro, Italy	Fairleigh Dickinson
Henrique Gallina	16	DF	6'1"	180	Graduate Student	Atibaia, Brazil	South Florida
Josh Luchini	19	FW	6'0"	165	Graduate Student	Wexford, Pennsylvania	Lehigh

==== Recruiting class ====
Name	Nat.	Hometown	Club	TDS Rating
Cabral Carter; GK	USA	Los Angeles, California	LAFC So Cal	2/5 stars
Jackson Gilman; MF	USA	Schwenksville, Pennsylvania	Philadelphia Union MLS Next	3/5 stars
Niko Manos; DF	USA	Ambridge, Pennsylvania	Pittsburgh Riverhounds	3/5 stars
Eben McIntyre; FW	USA	Charleroi, Pennsylvania	Century V FC	2/5 stars
Mateo Stoka; MF	USA	Milwaukee, Wisconsin	Sockers FC (Academy)	3/5 stars

== Squad ==
=== Roster ===
As of January 27, 2023

Note: Flags indicate national team as defined under FIFA eligibility rules; some limited exceptions apply. Players may hold more than one non-FIFA nationality.

No.	Pos.	Nation	Player
0	GK	USA	Cabral Carter
1	GK	NED	Joe Van der Sar
2	DF	USA	Jackson Gilman
3	MF	BRA	Leonardo Andrade
4	DF	JOR	Mohammad Abualnadi
5	DF	FRA	Yanis Leerman
6	MF	BRA	Lucas Rosa
7	MF	BRA	Guilherme Feitosa
8	MF	FRA	Valentin Noël
10	FW	FRA	Bertin Jacquesson
11	MF	BRA	Rodrigo Almeida
13	DF	USA	Noah Hall
14	DF	USA	Abraham Brown

No.	Pos.	Nation	Player
15	MF	ITA	Ideal Shefqeti
16	DF	BRA	Henrique Gallina
17	FW	USA	Luis Sahmkow
19	FW	USA	Josh Luchini
20	MF	USA	Mateo Stoka
21	MF	SRB	Filip Mirkovic
22	MF	FRA	Mathys Lefebvre
23	FW	GER	Djavid Abdullatif
24	MF	SUI	Jackson Walti
25	FW	USA	Eben McIntyre
26	MF	USA	Michael Sullivan
31	GK	AUT	Kilian Vallant
32	GK	USA	Andrew Noel

=== Team management ===
Position	Staff
Athletic Director	Heather Lyke
Head coach	Jay Vidovich
Assistant coach	Michael Behonick
Assistant coach	Bryce Cregan

== Schedule ==
Date Time, TV	Rank^{#}	Opponent^{#}	Result	Record	Site (Attendance) City, State
Exhibition
August 13*; 7:00 p.m.	No. 7	Robert Morris	N/A	—	Ambrose Urbanic Field; Pittsburgh, PA
August 19*; 7:00 p.m.	No. 7	at Michigan State	W 1–0	—	DeMartin Soccer Complex; East Lansing, MI
Regular season
August 25*; 8:00 p.m.	No. 7	No. 2 Georgetown	W 2–1	1–0–0	Ambrose Urbanic Field (2,000); Pittsburgh, PA
August 29*; 7:00 p.m.	No. 7	No. 6 West Virginia	W 3–0	2–0–0	Ambrose Urbanic Field (1,514); Pittsburgh, PA
September 2* :00 p.m.	No. 2	at No. 11 Marshall	L 1–2	2–1–0	Veterans Memorial Soccer Complex (1,879); Huntington, WV
September 5*; 7:00 p.m.	No. 2	Howard	W 5–0	3–1–0	Ambrose Urbanic Field (721); Pittsburgh, PA
September 9; 7:00 p.m.	No. 10	at North Carolina	W 1–0	4–1–0 (1–0–0)	Dorrance Field (2,437); Chapel Hill, NC
September 16; 7:00 p.m.	No. 10	NC State	W 3–0	5–1–0 (2–0–0)	Ambrose Urbanic Field (1,075); Pittsburgh, PA
September 19*; 7:00 p.m.	No. 10	No. 14 Akron	T 3–3	5–1–1	Ambrose Urbanic Field (495); Pittsburgh, PA
September 23; 8:00 p.m.	No. 8	at No. 25т Louisville	L 1–2	5–2–1 (2–1–0)	Lynn Stadium (508); Louisville, KY
September 30; 7:00 p.m.	No. 10	Virginia	L 1–3	5–3–1 (2–2–0)	Ambrose Urbanic Field (1,522); Pittsburgh, PA
October 7; 8:00 p.m.	No. 25	No. 23 Clemson	T 1–1	5–3–2 (2–2–1)	Ambrose Urbanic Field (1,428); Pittsburgh, PA
October 10*; 7:00 p.m.	No. 25	No. 10 Denver	T 2–2	5–3–3	Ambrose Urbanic Field (606); Pittsburgh, PA
October 14; 5:00 p.m.		at Virginia Tech	W 1–0	6–3–3 (3–2–1)	Thompson Field (1,640); Blacksburg, VA
October 17*; 7:00 p.m.		Duquesne	W 5–2	7–3–3	Ambrose Urbanic Field (939); Pittsburgh, PA
October 21; 8:00 p.m.		at No. 2т Duke	T 0–0	7–3–4 (3–2–2)	Koskinen Stadium (877); Durham, NC
October 28; 7:00 p.m.	No. 23	Notre Dame	T 1–1	7–3–5 (3–2–2)	Ambrose Urbanic Field (903); Pittsburgh, PA
ACC tournament
November 2; 7:00 p.m.	(6) No. 24	(11) NC State; First Round	W 4–1 ^{2OT}	8–3–5	Ambrose Urbanic Field (438); Pittsburgh, PA
November 6; 4:00 p.m., ACCN	(6) No. 24	at (3) No. 14 Virginia; Quarterfinals	L 0–1	8–4–5	Klöckner Stadium (1,036); Charlottesville, VA
NCAA tournament
November 17 :00 p.m., ESPN+		Cleveland State; First Round	W 2–1	9–4–5	Ambrose Urbanic Field (659); Pittsburgh, PA
November 20 :00 p.m., ESPN+		at (16) No. 15 Akron; Second Round	W 3–0	10–4–5	FirstEnergy Stadium (586); Akron, OH
November 27; 6:00 p.m., ESPN+		at (1) No. 2 Kentucky; Third Round	W 2–1	11–4–5	Bell Soccer Complex (1,708); Lexington, KY
December 3; 1:00 p.m., ESPN+		No. 18т Portland; Quarterfinal	W 1–0 ^{2OT}	12–4–5	Ambrose Urbanic Field (2,200); Pittsburgh, PA
November; 8:30 p.m., ESPNU		vs. (13) Indiana; Semifinals	L 0–2	12–5–5	WakeMed Soccer Park (10,286); Cary, NC
*Non-conference game. ^{#}Rankings from United Soccer Coaches. (#) Tournament seedings in parentheses. All times are in Eastern.

== Awards and honors ==
Recipient	Award	Date	Ref.
Jackson Walti	Pre-Season ACC Watchlist	August 16	
Valentin Noël	Hermann Trophy Pre-Season Watchlist	August 25	
Bertin Jacquesson	ACC Co-Offensive Player of the Week	August 30	
Jackson Gilman	ACC Co-Offensive Player of the Week	September 13	
Valentin Noel	All-ACC First Team	November 9	
Filip Mirkovic	All-ACC First Team	November 9	
Bertin Jacquesson	All-ACC Second Team	November 9	
Jackson Walti	All-ACC Second Team	November 9	
Jackson Gilman	ACC All-Freshman Team	November 9	

== Rankings ==
Ranking movements Legend: ██ Increase in ranking ██ Decrease in ranking — = Not ranked RV = Received votes т = Tied with team above or below ( ) = First-place votes
	Week																
Poll	Pre	1	2	3	4	5	6	7	8	9	10	11	12	13	14	15	Final
United Soccer	7	2 (1)	10т	10	8	10	25	RV	RV	23	24	RV	Not released				8
TopDrawer Soccer	9	5	5	5	3	10	14	15	14	13	15	16	—	22	22	10	4

== 2023 MLS Super draft ==
Player	Team	Round	Pick #	Position
Bertin Jacquesson	Real Salt Lake	1	16	FW
Valentin Noël	Austin FC	1	20	MF
Jackson Walti	Austin FC	2	56	MF
