= 2022 North Carolina Tar Heels men's soccer team =

American college soccer season

2022 North Carolina Tar Heels men's soccer

NCAA Tournament, First Round
- Conference: Atlantic Coast Conference
- Record: 8–6–5 (2–2–4 ACC)
- Head coach: Carlos Somoano (12th season)
- Assistant coaches: Grant Porter (12th season); Michael Harrington (1st season)
- Home stadium: Dorrance Field

2022 ACC men's soccer standings
	Conf.					Overall
Team	W		L		T	W		L		T
Atlantic
No. 1 Syracuse ‡	5	–	1	–	2	18	–	2	–	5
No. 24 Wake Forest +	5	–	3	–	0	14	–	6	–	0
Louisville +	4	–	3	–	1	9	–	6	–	3
No. 13 Clemson +	3	–	4	–	1	13	–	7	–	1
Boston College	1	–	4	–	3	4	–	7	–	5
NC State	1	–	5	–	2	6	–	7	–	5
Coastal
No. 3 Duke +	5	–	0	–	3	13	–	2	–	4
No. 16 Virginia +	5	–	1	–	2	10	–	4	–	5
No. 8 Pittsburgh +	3	–	2	–	3	12	–	5	–	5
North Carolina +	2	–	2	–	4	8	–	6	–	5
Notre Dame	3	–	4	–	1	8	–	7	–	2
Virginia Tech	0	–	8	–	0	3	–	14	–	1
‡ – ACC Tournament champion + – Also invited to the 2022 NCAA tournament; As of December 13, 2022; Rankings from United Soccer Coaches; Source: The ACC

The 2022 North Carolina Tar Heels men's soccer team represented the University of North Carolina at Chapel Hill during the 2022 NCAA Division I men's soccer season. It was the 76th season of the university fielding a program. The Tar Heels were led by twelfth year head coach Carlos Somoano and played their home games at Dorrance Field.

The Tar Heels finished the season 8–6–5 overall and 2–2–4 in ACC play to finish in fourth place in the Coastal Division. As the seventh overall seed in the ACC Tournament, they defeated Boston College in the First Round, before losing to eventual champions Syracuse in the Quarterfinals. They received an at-large bid to the NCAA Tournament. As an unseeded team, they lost to High Point in the First Round to end their season.

== Background ==
The Tar Heels finished the season 11–7–2 overall and 4–4–0 in ACC play to finish in fourth place in the Atlantic Division. As the seventh overall seed in the ACC Tournament, they defeated Syracuse in the First Round, before losing to Clemson in the Quarterfinals. They received an at-large bid to the NCAA Tournament. As an unseeded team, they defeated Loyola (MD) via penalty shoot-out in the First Round before losing to sixth seeded New Hampshire in the Second Round.

== Player movement ==
=== Departures ===
Departures
Name	Number	Pos.	Height	Weight	Year	Hometown	Reason for Departure
Alec Smir	1	GK	6'2"	190	Graduate Student	Greensboro, North Carolina	Drafted 62nd overall in the 2022 MLS SuperDraft
Filippo Zattarin	2	DF/MF	5'9"	168	Graduate Student	Padua, Italy	Graduated
Joe Pickering	4	DF	6'0"	175	Graduate Student	East Sussex, England	Graduated
Lucas del Rosario	7	FW/MF	5'10"	150	Graduate Student	Durham, North Carolina	Graduated
Santiago Herrera	9	FW	5'10"	160	Graduate Student	Barquisimeto, Venezuela	Graduated
Tega Ikoba	10	FW	6'4"	205	Freshman	Madison, Alabama	Signed a Homegrown Contract with Portland Timbers
Antonio Lopez	11	MF	5'8"	137	Junior	Austin, Texas	Transferred to Duke
J.P Philpot	12	GK	6'5"	195	Sophomore	Greenville, North Carolina	—
Jonathan Jimenez	16	FW	5'10"	169	Junior	Norwalk, Connecticut	Signed Homegrown Contract with NYCFC
Alex Rose	21	FW	6'1"	157	Graduate Student	Cary, North Carolina	Graduated
Jake Schick	30	GK	6'2"	172	Junior	Palm Harbor, Florida	—
Aldair Sanchez	32	DF	5'8"	148	Sophomore	Vancouver, Washington	—
Garrett Kessel	33	MF	5'10"	150	Sophomore	Oak Ridge, North Carolina	—
Sam Moore	35	MF/DF	6'1"	151	Junior	Richmond, Virginia	Transferred to DePaul
Jacques Bouvery	37	MF	5'8"	155	Junior	Washington, D.C.	Graduated
Gerit Wintermeyer	39	FW	6'3"	205	Graduate Student	Wiesbaden, Germany	Graduated
Chris Sullivan	41	MF	6'0"	160	Graduate Student	Naperville, Illinois	Graduated

=== Incoming transfers ===
Departures
Name	Number	Pos.	Height	Weight	Year	Hometown	Previous School
Andrew Cordes	1	GK	6'1"	190	(redshirt) Freshman	Denver, Colorado	Portland
Til Zinnhardt	2	DF	6'2"	175	Graduate Student	Konigstein, Germany	Tulsa
Juan Caffaro	10	MF	5'6"	150	Sophomore	Rosario, Argentina	Barry
Hilli Goldhar	11	MF	5'9"	150	Graduate Student	Toronto, Canada	Syracuse
James Person	16	DF	6'0"	160	Graduate Student	Walnut Creek, California	Saint Mary's
Sebastian Schacht	23	MF	6'0"	175	Graduate Student	Christchurch, New Zealand	Saint Mary's

=== Recruiting class ===
Name	Nat.	Hometown	Club	TDS Rating
Riley Berge; DF	USA	Columbia, Maryland	Baltimore Armour	4/5 stars
David Danquah; MF	USA	Chattanooga, Tennessee	Chattanooga Red Wolves	0/5 stars
Aristide Gry; GK	USA	Hong Kong	Black Rock FC	2/5 stars
Ty Johnson; FW	USA	Chesterfield, Virginia	Richmond United	3/5 stars
Hayden Morgan; MF	USA	Tampa, Florida	Tampa Bay Rowdies	3/5 stars
Parker O’Ferral; DF	USA	Raleigh, North Carolina	North Carolina FC	3/5 stars
Lucas Ross; FW	USA	Verona, New Jersey	PDA	2/5 stars
Rohit Thakur; FW	USA	Morrisville, North Carolina	North Carolina FC	3/5 stars
Sam Williams; MF	USA	Tenafly, New Jersey	New York Red Bulls	4/5 stars

== Squad ==
=== Roster ===
As of January 18, 2023

Note: Flags indicate national team as defined under FIFA eligibility rules; some limited exceptions apply. Players may hold more than one non-FIFA nationality.

No.	Pos.	Nation	Player
0	GK	USA	Quinn Colsson
1	GK	USA	Andrew Cordes
2	DF	GER	Til Zinnhardt
4	MF	SUI	Benjamin Kabeya
5	DF	USA	Julian Hinojosa
6	MF	USA	Andres Cardenas
7	MF	USA	Sam Williams
8	MF	USA	Jameson Charles
10	MF	ARG	Juan Caffaro
11	MF	CAN	Hilli Goldhar
12	GK	HKG	Aristide Gry
13	FW	USA	Key White
14	MF	SWE	Victor Olofsson
15	DF	USA	Riley Thomas
16	DF	USA	James Person
17	MF	USA	Cameron Fisher
18	DF	USA	Matthew Senanou
19	MF	USA	Jonathan Sinclair
20	MF	GHA	Ernest Bawa
22	MF	USA	Milo Garvanian

No.	Pos.	Nation	Player
23	MF	NZL	Sebastian Schacht
24	GK	SUI	Marco Saborio-Perez
25	FW	USA	Akeim Clarke
26	DF	USA	Matt Edwards
27	MF	USA	Andrew Czech
28	MF	GER	Tim Schels
29	MF	USA	Yaya Bakayoko
31	FW	USA	Luc Granitur
33	DF	USA	Riley Berge
34	MF	USA	Ahmad Al-Qaq
35	MF	USA	Ty Johnson
36	MF	BRA	Guy Vivaldini
37	DF	MEX	Derek Lippert
38	FW	USA	Lucas Ross
39	MF	USA	Hayden Morgan
40	DF	ENG	Finn Sansom
41	FW	USA	Rohit Thakur
42	FW	USA	Daniel Kutsch
44	DF	AUS	Charlie Harper

=== Team management ===
Position	Staff
Athletic Director	Bubba Cunningham
Head coach	Carlos Somoano
Assistant Coach	Grant Porter
Assistant Coach	Michael Harrington
Volunteer Assistant Coach	JR DeRose

== Schedule ==
Date Time, TV	Rank^{#}	Opponent^{#}	Result	Record	Site (Attendance) City, State
Exhibition
August 14*	No. 24	USC Upstate	W 3–0	–	Dorrance Field; Chapel Hill, NC
August 15*	No. 24	Mount Olive	T 1–1	–	Dorrance Field; Chapel Hill, NC
August 19*	No. 24	at James Madison	W 2–0	–	Sentara Park; Harrisonburg, VA
Regular season
August 25*; 7:30 p.m.	No. 24	Air Force	W 2–1	1–0–0	Dorrance Field (2,327); Chapel Hill, NC
August 28*; 7:30 p.m.	No. 24	South Florida	W 1–0	2–0–0	Dorrance Field (691); Chapel Hill, NC
September 3*; 7:30 p.m.	No. 13	FIU	L 1–2	2–1–0	Dorrance Field (774); Chapel Hill, NC
September 9; 7:00 p.m.		No. 10 Pittsburgh	L 0–1	2–2–0 (0–1–0)	Dorrance Field (2,437); Chapel Hill, NC
September 13* :00 p.m.		East Tennessee State	W 1–0	3–2–0	Dorrance Field (594); Chapel Hill, NC
September 16; 7:00 p.m.		at No. 5 Duke; Rivalry	T 1–1	3–2–1 (0–1–1)	Koskinen Stadium (3,155); Durham, NC
September 20*; 7:00 p.m.		UNC Wilmington	T 0–0	3–2–2	Dorrance Field (1,475); Chapel Hill, NC
September 24; 7:00 p.m.		at Notre Dame	W 1–0	4–2–2 (1–1–1)	Alumni Stadium (818); Notre Dame, IN
October 3; 7:00 p.m.		No. 17 Clemson	L 0–1	4–3–2 (1–2–1)	Dorrance Field (1,257); Chapel Hill, NC
October 7; 7:00 p.m.		Virginia Tech	W 2–0	5–3–2 (2–2–1)	Dorrance Field (1,588); Chapel Hill, NC
October 11*; 7:00 p.m.		VCU	W 1–0	6–3–2	Dorrance Field (690); Chapel Hill, NC
October 14; 7:00 p.m.		at NC State	T [ 2–2]	6–3–3 (2–2–2)	Dail Soccer Field (1,939); Raleigh, NC
October 18*; 7:00 p.m.		at Elon	L 0–3	6–4–3	Rudd Field (874); Elon, NC
October 21; 6:00 p.m.		at Boston College	T 1–1	6–4–4 (2–2–3)	Newton Campus Soccer Field (688); Chestnut Hill, MA
October 25* :00 p.m.		William & Mary	W 3–0	7–4–4	Dorrance Field (330); Chapel Hill, NC
October 28; 7:00 p.m.		No. 18 Virginia	T 2–2	7–4–5 (2–2–4)	Dorrance Field (1,196); Chapel Hill, NC
ACC Tournament
November 2; 6:00 p.m.	(7)	(10) Boston College; First Round	W 1–0	8–4–5	Dorrance Field (445); Chapel Hill, NC
November 6; 6:00 p.m., ACCNX	(7)	(2) No. 4 Syracuse; Quarterfinals	L 0–1	8–5–5	SU Soccer Stadium (1,292); Syracuse, NY
NCAA Tournament
November 17; 12:00 p.m., ESPN+		High Point; First Round	L 0–2	8–5–6	Dorrance Field (458); Chapel Hill, NC
*Non-conference game. ^{#}Rankings from United Soccer Coaches. (#) Tournament seedings in parentheses. All times are in Eastern.

== Awards and honors ==
Recipient	Award	Date	Ref.
Sebastian Schacht	Pre-Season ACC Watchlist	August 16	
Milo Garvanian	All-ACC Second Team	November 9	
Sam Williams	ACC All-Freshman Team	November 9	

== 2023 MLS Super Draft ==
Player	Team	Round	Pick #	Position
Milo Garvanian	CF Montréal	2	54	DF

== Rankings ==
Ranking movements Legend: ██ Increase in ranking ██ Decrease in ranking — = Not ranked RV = Received votes
	Week																
Poll	Pre	1	2	3	4	5	6	7	8	9	10	11	12	13	14	15	Final
United Soccer	24	13	RV	RV	RV	RV	—	—	—	—	—	—	Not released				—
TopDrawer Soccer	—	23	—	—	—	—	—	—	—	—	—	—	—	—	—	—	—
