= 2021 Wake Forest Demon Deacons men's soccer team =

American college soccer season

2021 Wake Forest Demon Deacons men's soccer

NCAA Tournament, Third Round
- Conference: Atlantic Coast Conference
- U. Soc. Coaches poll: No. 17
- Record: 13–7–1 (4–3–1 ACC)
- Head coach: Bobby Muuss (7th season)
- Assistant coaches: Steve Armas (7th season); Dane Brenner (11th season); Jonathan Lagos (3rd season)
- Home stadium: Spry Stadium

2021 ACC men's soccer standings
	Conf.					Overall
Team	W		L		T	W		L		T
Atlantic
No. 1 Clemson +	5	–	3	–	0	16	–	5	–	2
Louisville +	5	–	3	–	0	10	–	7	–	1
No. 17 Wake Forest +	4	–	3	–	1	13	–	7	–	1
Boston College	2	–	4	–	2	6	–	7	–	2
Syracuse	2	–	5	–	1	8	–	8	–	2
NC State	1	–	5	–	2	7	–	8	–	2
Coastal
No. 12 Duke +	5	–	2	–	1	14	–	5	–	1
No. 6 Pittsburgh +	5	–	2	–	1	13	–	5	–	2
No. 4 Notre Dame ‡	4	–	2	–	2	14	–	5	–	5
North Carolina +	4	–	4	–	0	11	–	7	–	2
No. 19 Virginia Tech +	3	–	4	–	1	11	–	5	–	4
Virginia	2	–	5	–	1	6	–	9	–	3
‡ – ACC Tournament champion + – Also invited to the 2021 NCAA tournament; As of December 14, 2021; Rankings from United Soccer Coaches; Source: The ACC

The 2021 Wake Forest Demon Deacons men's soccer team represented Wake Forest University during the 2021 NCAA Division I men's soccer season. It was the 75th season of the university fielding a program. It was the program's seventh season with Bobby Muuss as head coach. The Demon Deacons played their home matches at Spry Stadium.

The Demon Deacons finished the season 13–7–1 overall and 4–3–1 in ACC play to finish in third place in the Atlantic Division. As the sixth overall seed in the ACC Tournament they defeated Virginia in the first round before losing to Duke in the quarterfinals. They received an at-large bid to the NCAA Tournament. They were an unseeded team and defeated Mercer in the first round and thirteenth seed FIU in the second round before losing to fourth seed Notre Dame to end their season.

== Background ==
The teams' 2020 season was significantly impacted by the COVID-19 pandemic, which curtailed the fall season and caused the NCAA Tournament to be played in spring 2021. The ACC was one of the only two conferences in men's soccer to play in the fall of 2020. The ACC also held a mini-season during the spring of 2021.

The Demon Deacons finished the fall season 5–1–0 and 7–2–0 in ACC play to finish in first place in the South Division. In the ACC Tournament they lost to Virginia in the quarterfinals. They finished the spring season 4–0–2 and 3–0–2 in ACC play, to finish in third place in the Atlantic Division. They received an at-large bid to the NCAA Tournament. As the fifth seed in the tournament, they defeated Coastal Carolina in the second round and Kentucky in the third round before losing to North Carolina in the quarterfinals to end their season.

Four Demon Deacons men's soccer players were selected in the 2021 MLS SuperDraft: Calvin Harris, Michael DeShields, Justin McMaster and Andrew Pannenberg.

== Player movement ==
=== Players leaving ===
Departures
Name	Number	Pos.	Height	Weight	Year	Hometown	Reason for departure
Andrew Pannenberg	0	GK	6'3"	195	(redshirt) Junior	Charlotte, NC	Graduated; Drafted 49th overall in the 2021 MLS SuperDraft by Orlando City
Koby Carr	2	DF	5'9"	150	Junior	San Antonio, TX	Transferred to Charlotte
Michael DeShields	5	DF	6'1"	180	(redshirt) Senior	Baltimore, MD	Graduated; Drafted 5th overall in the 2021 MLS SuperDraft by D.C. United
Aristotle Zarris	7	MF	5'10"	160	Junior	Sarasota, FL	—
Justin McMaster	11	MF	5'9"	165	Senior	Kingston, Jamaica	Graduated; Drafted 17th overall in the 2021 MLS SuperDraft by Minnesota United
Isaiah Parente	15	MF	5'9"	150	Junior	Medina, OH	Signed a Homegrown contract with the Columbus Crew
Kyle McCurley	20	MF	5'10"	145	Senior	Lake Zurich, IL	Graduated
Machop Chol	21	MF	6'2"	175	Senior	Tucker, GA	Graduated; Signed a Homegrown contract with Atlanta United
Calvin Harris	22	FW	6'0"	160	Sophomore	Middlesbrough, England	Drafted 2nd overall in the 2021 MLS SuperDraft by FC Cincinnati
William Valtos	25	MF	5'8"	145	Sophomore	Manila, Philippines	—
Tyrrell Moore	28	DF	5'6"	150	Senior	Brooklyn, NY	Graduated
Dominic Peters	30	GK	6'3"	180	(redshirt) Junior	Santa Clara, CA	Graduated

=== Players arriving ===
Name	Nat.	Hometown	Club	TDS Rating
Robert Alphin; GK	USA	Raleigh, NC	North Carolina FC Youth	4/5 stars
Boima Cummins; DF	USA	Port Huron, MI	New York Red Bulls	4/5 stars
Mwinso Denkabe; FW	USA	Los Altos, CA	Silicon Valley Soccer Association	3/5 stars
Ryan Fessler; MF	USA	Charlotte, NC	Sporting Kansas City (Academy)	3/5 stars
Eligio Guarino; MF	USA	East Rockaway, NY	NYCFC	3/5 stars
Julian Kennedy; FW	USA	Orlando, FL	Orlando City (Academy)	3/5 stars
Nicolas Mancilla; MF	CHI	Osorno, Chile	Club Universidad de Chile	3/5 stars
Roald Mitchell; MF	USA	Montclair, NJ	PDA	4/5 stars
Babacar Niang; FW	SEN	Dakar, Senegal	The Pennington School	4/5 stars
Jake Nicoll; GK	USA	Short Hills, NJ	STA	2/5 stars
Tareq Shihab; MF	ENG	Brighton, England	Brighton & Hove Albion	3/5 stars

== Squad ==
=== Roster ===
As of February 3, 2022

Note: Flags indicate national team as defined under FIFA eligibility rules; some limited exceptions apply. Players may hold more than one non-FIFA nationality.

No.	Pos.	Nation	Player
1	GK	USA	Trace Alphin
2	DF	USA	Bo Cummins
3	FW	USA	Kyle Holcomb
4	DF	USA	Alec Kenison
5	DF	USA	Samuel Jones
8	FW	SEN	Babacar Niang
9	MF	USA	Roald Mitchell
10	MF	SWE	Oscar Sears
11	MF	USA	Leo Guarino
12	MF	USA	Takuma Suzuki
13	FW	USA	David Wrona
14	DF	USA	Jahlane Forbes
15	FW	USA	Mwinso Denkabe
16	DF	JPN	Hosei Kijima

No.	Pos.	Nation	Player
17	MF	USA	Omar Hernandez
18	MF	USA	Cooper Flax
19	DF	USA	Cristian Escribano
20	MF	USA	Ryan Fessler
21	FW	USA	Julian Kennedy
24	MF	USA	Jake Swallen
25	MF	USA	Chase Oliver
26	MF	USA	Colin Thomas
27	DF	USA	Prince Amponsah
28	MF	USA	Nicolas Mancilla
31	GK	USA	Cole McNally
32	DF	USA	Garrison Tubbs
33	DF	USA	Sebastian Scrivner

=== Team management ===
Position	Staff
Athletic Director	John Currie
Head coach	Bobby Muuss
Associate head coach	Steve Armas
Assistant Coach	Dane Brenner
Assistant Coach	Jonathan Lagos
Assistant Athletic Trainer	Michael White
Academic Counselor	Brooke Taylor
Sports Performance	David Bass

== Schedule ==
Date Time, TV	Rank^{#}	Opponent^{#}	Result	Record	Site (Attendance) City, State
Exhibition
August 15*; 7:00 p.m.	No. 7	at Furman	W 2–0	–	Stone Stadium; Greenville, SC
August 21*; 7:00 p.m.	No. 7	No. 25 Coastal Carolina	L 0–2	–	Spry Stadium; Winston–Salem, NC
Regular season
August 26*; 7:00 p.m., ACCNX	No. 7	VCU	L 0–2	0–1–0	Spry Stadium (1,296); Winston–Salem, NC
August 29*; 7:00 p.m., ACCN	No. 7	Bucknell	W 2–0	1–1–0	Spry Stadium (1,089); Winston–Salem, NC
September 4*; 7:00 p.m., ACCNX	No. 18	Cornell	W 2–1 ^{2OT}	2–1–0	Spry Stadium (1,491); Winston–Salem, NC
September 10; 7:30 p.m., ACCNX	No. 25	at Louisville	L 0–3	2–2–0 (0–1–0)	Lynn Stadium (1,307); Louisville, KY
September 17; 8:00 p.m., ACCNX		No. 5 Pittsburgh	W 3–1	3–2–0 (1–1–0)	Spry Stadium (2,176); Winston–Salem, NC
September 20*; 7:00 p.m., ESPN+		at George Mason	W 1–0	4–2–0	George Mason Stadium (175); Fairfax, VA
September 24; 7:00 p.m., ACCNX		at NC State	T 1–1 ^{2OT}	4–2–1 (1–1–1)	Dail Soccer Field (1,570); Raleigh, NC
September 28*; 7:00 p.m., ACCNX		Liberty	L 0–1 ^{2OT}	4–3–1	Spry Stadium (1,287); Winston–Salem, NC
October 1; 7:00 p.m., ACCNX		Clemson	L 1–2	4–4–1 (1–2–1)	Spry Stadium (3,560); Winston–Salem, NC
October 5*; 7:00 p.m., ACCNX		William & Mary	W 4–0	5–4–1	Spry Stadium (1,119); Winston–Salem, NC
October 8; 7:00 p.m., ACCNX		at North Carolina	W 2–1	6–4–1 (2–2–1)	Dorrance Field (1,283); Chapel Hill, NC
October 12*; 7:00 p.m., ACCNX		George Washington	W 3–0	7–4–1	Spry Stadium (1,127); Winston–Salem, NC
October 16; 7:00 p.m., ACCNX		No. 5 Virginia Tech	W 3–1	8–4–1 (3–2–1)	Spry Stadium (3,026); Winston–Salem, NC
October 19*; 7:00 p.m., ACCNX		Loyola (MD)	W 7–0	9–4–1	Spry Stadium (1,021); Winston–Salem, NC
October 23; 7:00 p.m., ACCNX		at Boston College	L 2–3	9–5–1 (3–3–1)	Newton Soccer Complex (658); Chestnut Hill, MA
October 29; 7:00 p.m., ACCNX		Syracuse	W 2–0	10–5–1 (4–3–1)	Spry Stadium (2,271); Winston–Salem, NC
ACC tournament
November 3; 8:00 p.m., ACCN	(6)	(11) Virginia; First Round	W 3–0	11–5–1	Spry Stadium (1,034); Winston–Salem, NC
November 7; 2:00 p.m., ACCN	(6)	(11) Duke; Quarterfinals	L 2–3	11–6–1	Koskinen Stadium (1,062); Durham, NC
NCAA tournament
November 18; 6:00 p.m., ACCNX		Mercer; First Round	W 2–1	12–6–1	Spry Stadium (855); Winston–Salem, NC
November 21; 6:00 p.m., ESPN+		(13) No. 14 FIU; Second Round	W 3–2	13–6–1	FIU Soccer Stadium (1,567); Miami, FL
November 28; 5:00 p.m., ACCNX		(4) No. 20 Notre Dame; Third Round	L 0–2	13–7–1	Alumni Stadium (481); Notre Dame, IN
*Non-conference game. ^{#}Rankings from United Soccer Coaches. (#) Tournament seedings in parentheses. All times are in Eastern.

== Awards and honors ==
Recipient	Award	Date	Ref.
Kyle Holcomb	Preseason All-ACC Watchlist	August 18, 2021	
Kyle Holcomb	All-ACC First Team	November 10	
Nico Benalcazar	All-ACC Third Team	November 10	
Omar Hernandez	All-ACC Third Team	November 10	
Jake Swallen	All-ACC Third Team	November 10	

== 2022 MLS Super Draft ==
Player	Team	Round	Pick #	Position
Kyle Holcomb	Charlotte FC	2	29	FW
Holland Rula	FC Dallas	Compensatory	87	DF

== Rankings ==
Ranking movements Legend: ██ Increase in ranking ██ Decrease in ranking — = Not ranked RV = Received votes
	Week																
Poll	Pre	1	2	3	4	5	6	7	8	9	10	11	12	13	14	15	Final
United Soccer	7	18	25	RV	RV	RV	—	RV	RV	RV	RV	RV	Not released				17
TopDrawer Soccer	6	8	8	—	18	20	—	19	18	—	—	—	—	—	—	—	—
