= Levonte Johnson =

Canadian soccer player (born 1999)

Personal information
- Full name: Levonte Leroy Brown Johnson
- Date of birth: March 15, 1999 (age 27)
- Place of birth: Brampton, Ontario, Canada
- Height: 1.78 m (5 ft 10 in)
- Position: Forward

Team information
- Current team: Forge FC (on loan from Colorado Springs Switchbacks)
- Number: 11

Youth career
- Botelho ST
- Brampton YSC

College career
Years	Team	Apps	(Gls)
2019	EFSC Titans	20	(10)
2020	SLCC Bruins	18	(11)
2021	Seattle Redhawks	22	(9)
2022	Syracuse Orange	25	(11)

Senior career*
Years	Team	Apps	(Gls)
2015–2017	Master's FA	16	(1)
2019	Treasure Coast Tritons	9	(4)
2021	Portland Timbers U23	7	(1)
2022	Chicago FC United	8	(3)
2023	Whitecaps FC 2	12	(6)
2023	→ Vancouver Whitecaps FC (loan)	1	(0)
2023–2024	Vancouver Whitecaps FC	31	(0)
2025–	Colorado Springs Switchbacks	30	(1)
2026–	→ Forge FC (loan)	7	(1)
- * Club domestic league appearances and goals as of October 25, 2026

Levonte Leroy Brown Johnson (born March 15, 1999) is a Canadian professional soccer player who plays for Forge FC in the Canadian Premier League on loan from USL Championship side Colorado Springs Switchbacks.

== Early life ==
Johnson played youth soccer with Botelho Soccer Training and Brampton YSC. In 2011, he represented Canada at the Danone U12 Cup. During his youth years, he also spent some time playing in England and Spain. In 2016, he won the ROPSSA high school boys soccer title.

== College career ==
In 2019, he began attending Eastern Florida State College, helping lead them to their first National Junior College Athletic Association championship game. He scored a brace in the regular season opener against Morton College on August 22, 2019. On September 20, 2019, he scored the double overtime winning goal to defeat the Daytona State Falcons 1-0. At the end of the season he was named to the All-Region 8 Second Team.

After the cancellation of the 2020 season due to the COVID-19 pandemic, he moved to Salt Lake Community College, where he guided the Bruins to their inaugural NJCAA title. In May 2021, he was named the Scenic West Player of the Week. After leading the team with eight goals, he was named to the All-Region 18 First-Team and the NJCAA All-America First Team.

In 2021, he transferred to Seattle University, joining the men's soccer team. That season, he led the team in goals, assists, and points that season and helping them win the Western Athletic Conference championship. At the end of the season, he was named to the All-WAC Second Team, the WAC All-Tournament Team, and the All-Far West Region Team. During the 2021 season, Major League Soccer teams were interested in drafting him, with Charlotte FC interested in taking him with the first-overall pick at the 2022 MLS SuperDraft. He attended the MLS Combine, however, he did not earn a Generation Adidas deal to enter the draft before finishing college, and was therefore ineligible for the draft.

In February 2022, Johnson transferred to Syracuse University, joining his fourth collegiate program in four years. Prior to the 2022 season, he was named to the Mac Hermann Trophy watchlist and the United Soccer Coaches watchlist. He made his debut on August 25, recording his first assist against the Iona Gaels. On September 2, he scored his first goal for Syracuse in a 1-1 draw against the Vermont Catamounts. In September, he was named the ACC Offensive Player of the Week for the first time. On October 18, he scored a brace against the Bucknell Bison. With Syracuse, he scored 11 goals, of which eight were game-winning goals, leading the NCAA and also added six assists, finishing second in the ACC in goals and points, and helped Syracuse win the national championship. He was named to the All-ACC First Team, the All-South Region First Team, and a First Team All-American in 2022. He was also named as a finalist for the Hermann Trophy, awarded to the top collegiate player in the United States.

== Club career ==
In 2015, he began playing with Master's FA in League1 Ontario, continuing with them in 2016 and 2017.

In 2019, he played for the Treasure Coast Tritons in USL League Two. At the end of May 2019, he was named to the Southern Conference Team of the Week. In 2021, Johnson played for Portland Timbers U23. With Portland, he won the Western Conference title. In 2022, he played for Chicago FC United.

At the 2023 MLS SuperDraft, Johnson was selected in the first round (29th overall) by the Vancouver Whitecaps FC. After attending pre-season with the MLS club, he signed a professional contract with their second team, Whitecaps FC 2 in MLS Next Pro on February 28, 2023. He scored his first goal on April 9, 2023 in a victory over North Texas SC. On April 23, he scored a brace in a victory over Minnesota United FC 2.

In March 2023, he joined the Vancouver Whitecaps first team on a short-term loan, ahead of a CONCACAF Champions League match, but was an unused substitute. In May 2023, he joined the first team on another short-term loan ahead of a Canadian Championship match, where he made his debut and scored in a victory against York United FC on May 11. He signed a third short-term loan at the end of May, making his MLS debut on May 27 against St. Louis City SC. He signed his fourth short term loan on June 6 (league rules allow up to four such loans per player per season). On June 30, he signed a full MLS contract with the first team for the remainder of the season, with club options for 2024 and 2025. On May 7, 2024, he scored a brace in a 2-1 victory over Cavalry FC in the 2024 Canadian Championship. At the end of the 2024 season, Johnson would have his club option declined by Vancouver, ending his time with the club.

In January 2025, Johnson signed with the Colorado Springs Switchbacks FC of the USL Championship.

In July 2026, Johnson was loaned to Forge FC of the Canadian Premier League.

== Career statistics ==
As of match played June 21, 2026

Appearances and goals by club, season and competition
Club	Season	League			Playoffs		National cup		Continental		Other		Total	
Club	Season	Division	Apps	Goals	Apps	Goals	Apps	Goals	Apps	Goals	Apps	Goals	Apps	Goals
Masters FA	2015	League1 Ontario	?	?	–		–		–		–		?	?
Masters FA	2016	League1 Ontario	15	1	–		–		–		–		15	1
Masters FA	2017	League1 Ontario	1	0	–		–		–		–		1	0
Masters FA	Total		16	1	0	0	0	0	0	0	0	0	16	1
Treasure Coast Tritons	2019	USL League Two	9	4	–		–		–		–		9	4
Portland Timbers U23	2021	USL League Two	7	1	0	0	–		–		–		7	1
Chicago FC United	2022	USL League Two	8	3	2	2	0	0	–		–		10	5
Whitecaps FC 2	2023	MLS Next Pro	12	6	0	0	–		–		–		12	6
Vancouver Whitecaps FC (loan)	2023	Major League Soccer	1	0	0	0	2	1	–		–		3	1
Vancouver Whitecaps FC	2023	Major League Soccer	6	0	1	0	0	0	–		2	0	9	0
Vancouver Whitecaps FC	2024	Major League Soccer	25	0	2	0	3	2	1	0	3	1	34	3
Vancouver Whitecaps FC	Total		32	1	3	0	5	3	1	0	5	1	47	4
Colorado Springs Switchbacks	2025	USL Championship	22	0	1	0	0	0	–		3	0	26	0
Colorado Springs Switchbacks	2026	USL Championship	8	1	0	0	2	0	–		1	0	11	1
Colorado Springs Switchbacks	Total		30	1	1	0	2	0	0	0	4	0	37	1
Career total			114	16	5	2	7	3	1	0	9	1	137	22

== Honours ==
Vancouver Whitecaps FC

- Canadian Championship: 2023, 2024

Forge FC

- Canadian Championship: 2026
