= Julian Hodek =

German footballer

Personal information
- Date of birth: 9 May 1998 (age 28)
- Place of birth: Werder, Germany
- Height: 1.77 m (5 ft 10 in)
- Position: Midfielder

Team information
- Current team: Maryland Bobcats
- Number: 21

Youth career
- 2015–2016: SV Babelsberg 03
- 2016–2017: FSV Zwickau

College career
Years	Team	Apps	(Gls)
2021–2023	FIU Panthers	47	(2)

Senior career*
Years	Team	Apps	(Gls)
2017–2019	FSV Zwickau	4	(0)
2019	BFC Dynamo	2	(0)
2019–2020	Rielasingen-Arlen	12	(0)
2020–2021	FC 08 Villingen	1	(0)
2022	Texas United	4	(2)
2024–	Maryland Bobcats	3	(0)
- * Club domestic league appearances and goals as of 03:15, 4 July 2024 (UTC)

Julian Hodek (born 9 May 1998) is a German footballer who plays as a midfielder for National Independent Soccer Association club Maryland Bobcats FC.
