= 2021 North Carolina Tar Heels men's soccer team =

American college soccer season

2021 North Carolina Tar Heels men's soccer

NCAA Tournament, Second Round
- Conference: Atlantic Coast Conference
- U. Soc. Coaches poll: No. RV
- TopDrawerSoccer.com: No. 22
- Record: 11–7–2 (4–4–0 ACC)
- Head coach: Carlos Somoano (11th season)
- Assistant coaches: Grant Porter (11th season); Will Clayton (4th season)
- Home stadium: Dorrance Field

2021 ACC men's soccer standings
| | Conf. | | | | | Overall |
| Team | W | | L | | T | W | | L | | T |
|---|---|---|---|---|---|---|---|---|---|---|
Atlantic
| No. 1 Clemson + | 5 | – | 3 | – | 0 | 16 | – | 5 | – | 2 |
| Louisville + | 5 | – | 3 | – | 0 | 10 | – | 7 | – | 1 |
| No. 17 Wake Forest + | 4 | – | 3 | – | 1 | 13 | – | 7 | – | 1 |
| Boston College | 2 | – | 4 | – | 2 | 6 | – | 7 | – | 2 |
| Syracuse | 2 | – | 5 | – | 1 | 8 | – | 8 | – | 2 |
| NC State | 1 | – | 5 | – | 2 | 7 | – | 8 | – | 2 |
Coastal
| No. 12 Duke + | 5 | – | 2 | – | 1 | 14 | – | 5 | – | 1 |
| No. 6 Pittsburgh + | 5 | – | 2 | – | 1 | 13 | – | 5 | – | 2 |
| No. 4 Notre Dame ‡ | 4 | – | 2 | – | 2 | 14 | – | 5 | – | 5 |
| North Carolina + | 4 | – | 4 | – | 0 | 11 | – | 7 | – | 2 |
| No. 19 Virginia Tech + | 3 | – | 4 | – | 1 | 11 | – | 5 | – | 4 |
| Virginia | 2 | – | 5 | – | 1 | 6 | – | 9 | – | 3 |
‡ – ACC Tournament champion + – Also invited to the 2021 NCAA tournament; As of December 14, 2021; Rankings from United Soccer Coaches; Source: The ACC

The 2021 North Carolina Tar Heels men's soccer team represented the University of North Carolina at Chapel Hill during the 2021 NCAA Division I men's soccer season. It was the 75th season of the university fielding a program. The Tar Heels were led by eleventh year head coach Carlos Somoano and played their home games at Dorrance Field.

The Tar Heels finished the season 11–7–2 overall and 4–4–0 in ACC play to finish in fourth place in the Coastal Division. As the seventh overall seed in the ACC Tournament, they defeated Syracuse in the First Round, before losing to Clemson in the Quarterfinals. They received an at-large bid to the NCAA Tournament. As an unseeded team, they defeated Loyola (MD) via penalty shoot-out in the First Round before losing to sixth seeded New Hampshire in the Second Round.

== Background ==
The teams' 2020 season was significantly impacted by the COVID-19 pandemic, which curtailed the fall season and caused the NCAA Tournament to be played in spring 2021. The ACC was one of the only two conferences in men's soccer to play in the fall of 2020. The ACC also held a mini-season during the spring of 2021.

The Tar Heels finished the fall season 3–2–2 and 3–1–2 in ACC play to finish in second place in the South Division. In the ACC Tournament lost to Notre Dame in the Quarterfinals. They finished the spring season 4–2–1 and 4–1–1 in ACC play, to finish in second place in the Coastal Division. They received an at-large bid to the NCAA Tournament. As an unseeded team in the tournament, they progressed pass Charlotte in the Second Round via penalties, defeated Stanford in the Third Round, and Wake Forest in the Quarterfinals before losing to Marshall in the Semifinals to end their season.

At the end of the season, three Tar Heels men's soccer players were selected in the 2021 MLS SuperDraft: Matt Constant, Mark Salas and Giovanni Montesdeoca.

== Player movement ==
=== Departures ===
Departures
| Name | Number | Pos. | Height | Weight | Year | Hometown | Reason for Departure |
|---|---|---|---|---|---|---|---|
| Matt Constant | 6 | DF | 6'6" | 190 | Senior | Dallas, TX | Graduated |
| Giovanni Montesdeoca | 10 | FW | 5'9" | 167 | Senior | Dallas, TX | Graduated; Drafted 79th overall in the 2021 MLS SuperDraft by FC Dallas |
| Sam Jones | 18 | MF | 6'2" | 190 | Senior | Cardiff, Wales | Graduated |
| Axel Alejandre | 26 | DF | 5'11" | | Freshman | Chicago, IL | Transferred to Louisville |
| Mark Salas | 27 | DF | 5'10" | 150 | Senior | Dallas, TX | Graduated; Drafted 76th overall in the 2021 MLS SuperDraft by FC Dallas |
| Malik Henry | 31 | FW | 5'6" | 130 | Freshman | Hamilton, Canada | Transferred to Akron |
| Roman Knox | 38 | MF | 5'10" | 150 | Junior | Shawnee, KS | Transferred to SMU |
| Taff Wadda | 39 | FW | 5'9" | 150 | Senior | Brackell, England | Graduated |

=== Recruiting class ===
| Name | Nat. | Hometown | Club | TDS Rating |
|---|---|---|---|---|
| Nicolas Bellini; FW | USA | Lehi, UT | Real Salt Lake | 4/5 stars |
| Andres Cardenas; FW | USA | Doral, FL | Inter Miami CF U18 | 4/5 stars |
| Quinn Closson; GK | USA | Fairfield, CT | NYCFC Academy | 3/5 stars |
| Andrew Czech; MF | USA | Elmhurst, IL | Sockers FC | 3/5 stars |
| Matthew Edwards; DF | USA | Atlanta, GA | Atlanta United | 3/5 stars |
| Luc Granitur; FW | USA | Vero Beach, FL | SIMA | 3/5 stars |
| Tega Ikoba; FW | USA | Huntsville, AL | Portland Timbers Academy | 4/5 stars |
| Daniel Kutsch; MF | USA | Birmingham, AL | Alabama FC | 2/5 stars |
| Zack Naughton; MF | USA | Goldsboro, NC | Wilmington Hammerheads FC | 2/5 stars |
| Lucas Ross; FW | USA | Verona, NJ | PDA Academy | N/A |
| Matthew Senanou; DF | USA | Plainfield, IL | Sockers FC | 3/5 stars |
| Gui Vivaldini; MF | USA | Chattanooga, TN | The McCallie School | 2/5 stars |

== Squad ==
=== Roster ===
As of January 27, 2022

Note: Flags indicate national team as defined under FIFA eligibility rules; some limited exceptions apply. Players may hold more than one non-FIFA nationality.

| No. | Pos. | Nation | Player |
|---|---|---|---|
| 0 | GK | USA | Quinn Colsson |
| 1 | GK | USA | Alec Smir |
| 2 | DF | ITA | Filippo Zattarin |
| 4 | DF | ENG | Joe Pickering |
| 5 | DF | USA | Julian Hinojosa |
| 6 | MF | USA | Andres Cardenas |
| 7 | FW | USA | Lucas del Rosario |
| 8 | MF | USA | Jameson Charles |
| 9 | FW | VEN | Santiago Herrera |
| 10 | FW | USA | Tega Ikoba |
| 11 | MF | USA | Antonio Lopez |
| 12 | GK | USA | J.P. Philpot |
| 13 | FW | USA | Key White |
| 14 | MF | SWE | Victor Olofsson |
| 15 | DF | USA | Riley Thomas |
| 16 | FW | USA | Jonathan Jimenez |
| 17 | MF | USA | Cameron Fisher |
| 18 | DF | USA | Matthew Senanou |
| 19 | MF | USA | Jonathan Sinclair |
| 20 | MF | USA | Ernest Bawa |

| No. | Pos. | Nation | Player |
|---|---|---|---|
| 21 | FW | USA | Alex Rose |
| 22 | MF | USA | Milo Garvanian |
| 24 | GK | SUI | Marco Saborio-Perez |
| 25 | FW | USA | Akeim Clarke |
| 26 | DF | USA | Matt Edwards |
| 27 | MF | USA | Andrew Czech |
| 28 | MF | GER | Tim Schels |
| 29 | MF | USA | Yaya Bakayoko |
| 30 | GK | USA | Jake Schick |
| 31 | FW | USA | Luc Granitur |
| 32 | DF | USA | Aldair Sanchez |
| 33 | MF | USA | Garrett Kessel |
| 34 | MF | USA | Ahmad Al-Qaq |
| 35 | MF | USA | Sam Moore |
| 36 | MF | BRA | Guy Vivaldini |
| 37 | MF | USA | Jacques Bouvery |
| 39 | FW | GER | Gerit Wintermeyer |
| 41 | MF | USA | Chris Sullivan |
| 42 | FW | USA | Daniel Kutsch |

=== Team management ===
| Position | Staff |
|---|---|
| Athletic Director | Bubba Cunningham |
| Head coach | Carlos Somoano |
| Assistant Coach | Grant Porter |
| Assistant Coach | Will Clayton |
| Volunteer Assistant Coach | Michael Harrington |

== Schedule ==
| Date Time, TV | Rank^{#} | Opponent^{#} | Result | Record | Site (Attendance) City, State |
Exhibition
| August 15*; 8:30 p.m. | No. 4 | No. 1 Marshall | T 1–1 | – | Dorrance Field; Chapel Hill, NC |
| August 20*; 7:00 p.m. | No. 4 | Liberty | L 0–1 | – | Liberty Soccer Stadium; Lynchburg, VA |
Regular season
| August 26*; 7:30 p.m., ACCNX | No. 4 | Bucknell | W 7–0 | 1–0–0 | Dorrance Field (1,227); Chapel Hill, NC |
| August 29*; 7:30 p.m., ACCNX | No. 4 | VCU | T 1–1 ^{2OT} | 1–0–1 | Dorrance Field (1,776); Chapel Hill, NC |
| September 3*; 7:00 p.m., ACCNX | No. 6 | Georgia Southern | W 3–0 | 2–0–1 | Dorrance Field (498); Chapel Hill, NC |
| September 6*; 7:00 p.m., ESPN+ | No. 6 | at Davidson | W 3–0 | 3–0–1 | Alumni Soccer Stadium (2,163); Davidson, NC |
| September 10; 7:00 p.m., ACCNX | No. 4 | at No. 15 Pittsburgh | L 0–4 | 3–1–1 (0–1–0) | Ambrose Urbanic Field (1,115); Pittsburgh, PA |
| September 14*; 7:00 p.m., ACCNX | No. 16 | Campbell | W 1–0 | 4–1–1 | Dorrance Field (538); Chapel Hill, NC |
| September 19; 7:00 p.m., ACCN | No. 16 | No. 12 Duke; Rivalry | L 0–3 | 4–2–1 (0–2–0) | Dorrance Field (2,310); Chapel Hill, NC |
| September 25; 7:00 p.m., ACCRSN | | at Virginia | W 2–0 | 5–2–1 (1–2–0) | Klöckner Stadium (2,046); Charlottesville, VA |
| September 29*; 7:00 p.m., FloSports | | at UNC Wilmington | L 1–2 | 5–3–1 | UNCW Soccer Stadium (1,321); Wilmington, NC |
| October 3; 7:00 p.m., ACCN | | NC State | W 4–0 | 6–3–1 (2–2–0) | Dorrance Field (1,433); Chapel Hill, NC |
| October 8; 7:00 p.m., ACCNX | | Wake Forest | L 1–2 | 6–4–1 (2–3–0) | Dorrance Field (1,283); Chapel Hill, NC |
| October 12*; 7:00 p.m., ACCNX | | Wofford | W 1–0 | 7–4–1 | Dorrance Field (466); Chapel Hill, NC |
| October 15; 7:00 p.m., ACCN | | at Louisville | L 0–2 | 7–5–1 (2–4–0) | Lynn Stadium (562); Louisville, KY |
| October 19*; 7:00 p.m., ACCNX | | No. 15 Loyola Marymount | W 2–0 | 8–5–1 | Dorrance Field (471); Chapel Hill, NC |
| October 24; 7:00 p.m., ACCRSN | | at No. 13 Virginia Tech | W 2–0 | 9–5–1 (3–4–0) | Thompson Field (1,115); Blacksburg, VA |
| October 29; 4:30 p.m., ESPNU | | No. 11 Notre Dame | W 3–1 | 10–5–1 (4–4–0) | Dorrance Field (1,481); Chapel Hill, NC |
ACC Tournament
| November 3; 8:00 p.m., ACCN | (7) No. 18 | (10) Syracuse; First Round | W 1–0 ^{2OT} | 11–5–1 | Dorrance Field (544); Chapel Hill, NC |
| November 7; 8:00 p.m., ACCN | (7) No. 18 | at (2) No. 9 Clemson; Quarterfinals | L 1–2 | 11–6–1 | Riggs Field (2,351); Clemson, SC |
NCAA Tournament
| November 18; 6:00 p.m., ACCNX | No. 23 | Loyola (MD); First Round | T 0–0 (4–2 PKs) | 11–6–2 | Dorrance Field (1,347); Chapel Hill, NC |
| November 21; 2:00 p.m., ESPN+ | No. 23 | (16) No. 6 New Hampshire; Second Round | L 1–4 | 11–7–2 | Wildcat Stadium (3,264); Durham, NH |
*Non-conference game. ^{#}Rankings from United Soccer Coaches. (#) Tournament seedings in parentheses. All times are in Eastern.

== Awards and honors ==
| Recipient | Award | Date | Ref. |
|---|---|---|---|
| Alec Smir | Preseason All-ACC Watchlist | August 18 | |
| Milo Garvanian | ACC Offensive Player of the Week | October 26 | |
| Alec Smir | ACC Defensive Player of the Week | October 26 | |
| Alec Smir | All-ACC First Team | November 10 | |
| Joe Pickering | All-ACC Third Team | November 10 | |
| Filippo Zattarin | All-ACC Third Team | November 10 | |
| Ken Bellini | ACC All-Freshman Team | November 10 | |
| Tega Ikoba | ACC All-Freshman Team | November 10 | |

== 2022 MLS Super Draft ==
| Player | Team | Round | Pick # | Position |
|---|---|---|---|---|
| Alec Smir | FC Dallas | 3 | 62 | GK |

== Rankings ==
Ranking movements Legend: ██ Increase in ranking ██ Decrease in ranking — = Not ranked RV = Received votes
| | Week | | | | | | | | | | | | | | | | |
| Poll | Pre | 1 | 2 | 3 | 4 | 5 | 6 | 7 | 8 | 9 | 10 | 11 | 12 | 13 | 14 | 15 | Final |
|---|---|---|---|---|---|---|---|---|---|---|---|---|---|---|---|---|---|
| United Soccer | 4 | 6 | 4 | 16 | RV | RV | RV | — | — | RV | 18 | 23 | Not released | | | | RV |
| TopDrawer Soccer | 4 | 5 | 2 | 4 | 11 | 11 | 17 | — | — | 23 | 20 | 20 | 22 | 22 | 22 | 22 | 22 |
