= 2021 Notre Dame Fighting Irish men's soccer team =

American college soccer season

2021 Notre Dame Fighting Irish men's soccer

ACC Tournament Champions

NCAA Tournament, Semifinals
- Conference: Atlantic Coast Conference
- U. Soc. Coaches poll: No. 4
- TopDrawerSoccer.com: No. 4
- Record: 14–5–5 (4–2–2 ACC)
- Head coach: Chad Riley (4th season)
- Assistant coaches: Mike Graczyk (2nd season); Jeff Rowland (1st season)
- Home stadium: Alumni Stadium

2021 ACC men's soccer standings
	Conf.					Overall
Team	W		L		T	W		L		T
Atlantic
No. 1 Clemson +	5	–	3	–	0	16	–	5	–	2
Louisville +	5	–	3	–	0	10	–	7	–	1
No. 17 Wake Forest +	4	–	3	–	1	13	–	7	–	1
Boston College	2	–	4	–	2	6	–	7	–	2
Syracuse	2	–	5	–	1	8	–	8	–	2
NC State	1	–	5	–	2	7	–	8	–	2
Coastal
No. 12 Duke +	5	–	2	–	1	14	–	5	–	1
No. 6 Pittsburgh +	5	–	2	–	1	13	–	5	–	2
No. 4 Notre Dame ‡	4	–	2	–	2	14	–	5	–	5
North Carolina +	4	–	4	–	0	11	–	7	–	2
No. 19 Virginia Tech +	3	–	4	–	1	11	–	5	–	4
Virginia	2	–	5	–	1	6	–	9	–	3
‡ – ACC Tournament champion + – Also invited to the 2021 NCAA tournament; As of December 14, 2021; Rankings from United Soccer Coaches; Source: The ACC

The 2021 Notre Dame Fighting Irish men's soccer team represented the University of Notre Dame during the 2021 NCAA Division I men's soccer season. It was the program's 44th season. It was the program's ninth season competing in the Atlantic Coast Conference. The Fighting Irish were led by head coach Chad Riley, in his fourth year and played their home games at Alumni Stadium in Notre Dame, Indiana.

The Fighting Irish finished the season 14–5–5 overall and 4–2–2 in ACC play to finish in third place in the Coastal Division. As the fifth overall seed in the ACC Tournament they defeated NC State in the First Round, Louisville on penalties in the Second Round, Pittsburgh in the Semifinals, and Duke in the Final to win the tournament. This was their first tournament title after moving to the ACC in 2013. As tournament champions, they received an automatic bid to the NCAA Tournament and were awarded the fourth overall seed. After a First Round bye, they defeated Villanova in the Second Round, Wake Forest in the Third Round, and Pittsburgh in the Quarterfinals via penalty shootout before losing to Clemson in the Semifinals again via penalty shootout to end their season.

== Background ==
The teams' 2020 season was significantly impacted by the COVID-19 pandemic, which curtailed the fall season and caused the NCAA Tournament to be played in spring 2021. The ACC was one of the only two conferences in men's soccer to play in the fall of 2020. The ACC also held a mini-season during the spring of 2021.

The Fighting Irish finished the fall season 5–4–0 and 3–2–0 in ACC play to finish in third place in the North Division. In the ACC Tournament they defeated North Carolina in the Quarterfinals before losing to Pittsburgh in the Semifinals. They finished the spring season 3–5–0 and 1–5–0 in ACC play, to finish in sixth place in the Coastal Division. They were not invited to the NCAA Tournament.

In the 2021 MLS SuperDraft, the Fighting Irish had one player drafted: Aiden McFadden.

== Player movement ==
=== Players leaving ===
Departures
Name	Number	Pos.	Height	Weight	Year	Hometown	Reason for departure
Keagan McLaughlin	1	GK	6'4"	190	Senior	Zanesville, OH	Graduated
Mohammad Abualnadi	5	DF	6'1"	165	Sophomore	Leawood, KS	—
Aiden McFadden	10	MF	5'10"	165	Senior	West Chester, PA	Graduated; Drafted 59th overall in the 2021 MLS SuperDraft by Atlanta United
Simon Roennecke	11	FW	6'0"	165	Senior	Pleasant Ridge, MI	Graduated
Patrick Coleman	13	MF	5'11"	155	Junior	Antioch, IL	—
Senan Farrelly	17	DF	6'1"	196	Graduate Student	Havertown, PA	Graduated
Townsend Meyer	18	MF	6'0"	169	Senior	San Diego, CA	Graduated
Jacob Huber	24	DF	6'0"	175	Senior	Lebanon, OH	Graduated
Zach Dedrick	25	DF	6'3"	180	Sophomore	Wilton, CT	—
Sam Guinane	30	GK	6'3"	185	Junior	San Juan Capistrano, CA	—

=== Players arriving ===
Name	Nat.	Hometown	Club	TDS Rating
Mateo Acosta; DF	USA	Skokie, IL	Chicago Fire	3/5 stars
Bryce Boneau; MF	USA	Keller, TX	FC Dallas	3/5 stars
Liam Egan; GK	USA	Louisville, KY	Bridgton Academy	3/5 stars
Kyle Genenbacher; DF	USA	Farmington, MO	St. Louis FC U17	4/5 stars
Eno Nto; FW	ENG	Derby, England	Derby County FC	N/A
Joshua Ramsey; DF	USA	Plano, TX	FC Dallas Academy	4/5 stars
Matthew Roou; FW	USA	Germantown, WI	Indiana Fire Academy	4/5 stars
Michael Rossi; FW	USA	Glen Ellyn, IL	Sockers FC	3/5 stars
Cleveland Sellers IV; DF	USA	Charlotte, NC	Charlotte Independence SC	3/5 stars

== Squad ==
=== Roster ===
As of February 10, 2022

Note: Flags indicate national team as defined under FIFA eligibility rules; some limited exceptions apply. Players may hold more than one non-FIFA nationality.

No.	Pos.	Nation	Player
0	GK	USA	Thomas Deslongchamps
2	DF	USA	Philip Quinton
3	DF	USA	Reese Mayer
4	DF	USA	Aaron Hill
5	MF	USA	Bryce Boneau
6	MF	USA	Michael Pellegrino
7	MF	IRL	Ethan O'Brien
8	MF	CAN	Matthew Radivojsa
9	FW	USA	Tyler Shea
10	MF	USA	Matthew McLaughlin
11	FW	USA	Daniel Russo
12	MF	USA	Bryan Silver
13	DF	USA	Cleveland Sellers IV
14	MF	USA	Michael Lynch
15	DF	NIR	Paddy Burns

No.	Pos.	Nation	Player
16	FW	ENG	Eno Nto
17	DF	USA	Mateo Acosta
18	DF	USA	Josh Ramsey
19	FW	USA	Michael Rossi
21	FW	USA	Matthew Roou
22	MF	CAN	PJ Bujouves
23	FW	USA	Alex Salvino
24	DF	USA	Kyle Genenbacher
26	MF	USA	Ben Giacobello
27	FW	USA	Jack Lynn
28	FW	USA	Dawson McCartney
29	MF	SOM	Mohamed Omar
30	GK	USA	Liam Egan
31	GK	USA	Bryan Dowd

=== Team management ===
Position	Staff
Athletic Director	Jack Swarbrick
Head coach	Chad Riely
Assistant Coach	Mike Graczyk
Assistant Coach	Jeff Rowland
Director of Operations	Chris Rolfe

== Schedule ==
Date Time, TV	Rank^{#}	Opponent^{#}	Result	Record	Site City, State
Exhibition
August 18*; 7:00 p.m.		Butler		—	Alumni Stadium; Notre Dame, IN
August 23*; 7:00 p.m.		St. Thomas		—	Alumni Stadium; Notre Dame, IN
Regular Season
August 27*; 7:00 p.m., ACCNX		No. 2 Indiana	L 2–3 ^{OT}	0–1–0	Alumni Stadium (2,347); Notre Dame, IN
August 30*; 7:00 p.m., ACCNX		NIU	W 2–0	1–1–0	Alumni Stadium (456); Notre Dame, IN
September 3*; 7:30 p.m., ESPN+		at No. 21 Kentucky	L 0–1	1–2–0	Bell Soccer Complex (1,589); Lexington, KY
September 10; 7:00 p.m., ACCNX		at Boston College	T 1–1 ^{2OT}	1–2–1 (0–0–1)	Newton Soccer Complex (927); Chestnut Hill, MA
September 14*; 7:00 p.m., ACCN		Michigan State	L 3–4	1–3–1	Alumni Stadium (351); Notre Dame, IN
September 17; 7:00 p.m., ACCNX		NC State	W 1–0	2–3–1 (1–0–1)	Alumni Stadium (1,001); Notre Dame, IN
September 21*; 7:00 p.m., ESPNU		at Michigan	W 3–1	3–3–1	U-M Soccer Stadium (317); Ann Arbor, MI
September 24; 7:00 p.m.		at No. 12 Virginia Tech	L 1–2 ^{OT}	3–4–1 (1–1–1)	Thompson Field (1,423); Blacksburg, VA
September 28*; 7:00 p.m.		Trine	W 13–0	4–4–1	Alumni Stadium (318); Notre Dame, IN
October 1; 6:00 p.m., ACCN		Virginia	W 2–1	5–4–1 (2–1–1)	Alumni Stadium (1,213); Notre Dame, IN
October 5*; 7:00 p.m.		Purdue Fort Wayne	W 4–0	6–4–1	Alumni Stadium (403); Notre Dame, IN
October 9; 7:00 p.m.		at No. 21 Clemson	W 2–0	7–4–1 (3–1–1)	Riggs Field (1,500); Clemson, SC
October 16; 7:00 p.m., ACCNX		No. 7 Pittsburgh	W 1–0 ^{2OT}	8–4–1 (4–1–1)	Alumni Stadium (385); Notre Dame, IN
October 19*; 7:00 p.m.	No. 20	UIC	W 3–0	9–4–1	Alumni Stadium (259); Notre Dame, IN
October 22; 7:00 p.m.	No. 20	No. 18 Duke	T 1–1 ^{2OT}	9–4–2 (4–1–2)	Alumni Stadium (1,037); Notre Dame, IN
October 29; 4:30 p.m., ESPNU	No. 11	at North Carolina	L 1–3	9–5–2 (4–2–2)	Dorrance Field (1,481); Chapel Hill, NC
ACC tournament
November 3; 7:00 p.m., ACCNX	(5) No. 23	(12) NC State; First Round	W 1–0	10–5–2	Alumni Stadium (174); South Bend, IN
November 7; 6:00 p.m., ACCN	(5) No. 23	at (4) Louisville; Quarterfinals	T 0–0 (3–0 PKs) ^{2OT}	10–5–3	Lynn Stadium (582); Louisville, KY
November 10; 5:00 p.m., ACCN	(5) No. 20	at (1) No. 5 Pittsburgh; Semifinals	W 2–0	11–5–3	Ambrose Urbanic Field (1,626); Pittsburgh, PA
November 14; 2:00 p.m., ESPNU	(5) No. 20	vs. (3) No. 11 Duke; Final	W 2–0	12–5–3	WakeMed Soccer Park (2,737); Cary, NC
NCAA tournament
November 21; 5:00 p.m.	(4) No. 20	Villanova; Second Round	W 3–0	13–5–3	Alumni Stadium (891); South Bend, IN
November 28; 5:00 p.m.	(4) No. 20	Wake Forest; Third Round	W 2–0	14–5–3	Alumni Stadium (481); South Bend, IN
December 4; 5:00 p.m.	(4) No. 20	(5) No. 5 Pittsburgh; Quarterfinals	T 1–1 (4–2 PKs)	14–5–4	Alumni Stadium (1,303); South Bend, IN
December 10; 6:00 p.m., ESPNU	(4) No. 20	vs. (8) No. 9 Clemson; Semifinals	T 1–1 (4–5 PKs)	14–5–5	WakeMed Soccer Park (10,132); Cary, NC
*Non-conference game. ^{#}Rankings from United Soccer Coaches. (#) Tournament seedings in parentheses. All times are in Eastern.

== Awards and honors ==
Recipient	Award	Date	Ref.
Jack Lynn	Preseason All-ACC Watchlist	August 18	
Daniel Russo	Co-Offensive Player of the Week	October 13	
Philip Quinton	Defensive Player of the Week	October 13	
Paddy Burns	ACC Defensive Player of the Week	October 19	
Trace Alphin	ACC Co-Defensive Player of the Week	November 2	
Jack Lynn	All-ACC First Team	November 10	
Philip Quinton	All-ACC Third Team	November 10	
Josh Ramsey	ACC All-Freshman Team	November 10	
Matthew Roou	ACC All-Freshman Team	November 10	
Bryan Dowd	ACC All-Tournament Team	November 15	
Jack Lynn	ACC All-Tournament Team	November 15	
Dawson McCartney	ACC All-Tournament Team	November 15	
Philip Quinton	ACC All-Tournament Team	November 15	
Dawson McCartney	ACC Tournament MVP	November 15	

== 2022 MLS Super Draft ==
Player	Team	Round	Pick #	Position
Jack Lynn	Orlando City	1	18	FW
Mohamed Omar	Colorado Rapids	1	23	MF
Philip Quinton	Columbus Crew	1	25	DF

== Rankings ==
Ranking movements Legend: ██ Increase in ranking ██ Decrease in ranking — = Not ranked RV = Received votes
	Week																
Poll	Pre	1	2	3	4	5	6	7	8	9	10	11	12	13	14	15	Final
United Soccer	RV	—	—	—	—	—	—	RV	20	11	23	20	Not released				4
TopDrawer Soccer	—	—	—	—	—	—	—	—	—	—	—	—	11	9	6	3	4
