= 2022 NCAA Division I men's soccer season =

American college soccer season

- Duration: August 25, 2022 to December 12, 2022
- Number of teams: 212
- Preseason No. 1: Clemson
- Hermann Trophy: Duncan McGuire
- Top goalscorer: Duncan McGuire (22)

Statistics
- Biggest home win: 8 goals: Siena 8–0 Hartford (September 11)
- Biggest away win: 6 goals: VMI 0–6 Northern Kentucky (September 6)
- Highest scoring: 10 goals: UMBC 8–2 Fairfield (August 26)
- Longest winless run: 21 games: Colgate (April 3, 2021–August 25, 2022)
- Longest losing run: 20 games: Colgate (April 10, 2021–August 25, 2022)

Tournament
- Duration: November 14 to December 12, 2022
- Most conference bids: ACC – 8 bids

Men's College Cup
- Date: December 12
- Site: WakeMed Soccer Park; Cary, NC
- Champions: Syracuse
- Runners-up: Indiana

Seasons
- ← 2021 2023 →

The 2022 NCAA Division I men's soccer season was the 64th season of NCAA championship men's college soccer.

The season began in August 2022 and concluded in November. It culminated with the 2022 NCAA Division I Men's Soccer Tournament, with the Men's College Cup held at WakeMed Soccer Park in Cary, North Carolina.

Syracuse won the NCAA Championship by defeating Indiana 7–6 on penalty kicks following a 2–2 draw.

== Changes from 2021 ==
=== Rule changes ===
In April 2022, during a meeting among the NCAA Playing Rules Oversight Panel (PROP), several major rule changes were enacted. This included overtime, expansion of video assistant referee (VAR), and the appeals process of a suspension.

Specifically overtime was abolished during the regular season. Matches that ended in a draw during a conference or national tournament match would go to extra time, consisting of two 10-minute periods without a golden goal. A playoff game tied after two overtime periods would still move to a penalty kick shoot-out with the winner determined by the teams alternating kicks from the penalty mark. Additionally PROP approved VAR to be used for fouls that occurred outside of the penalty area, as well as allowing a 48-hour period to appeal a red card decision.

=== Coaching changes ===
A total of 24 coaching changes took place during the 2021–22 offseason. One head coach announced his retirement after the 2021 season, but backed out of his retirement plan and was rehired by his program.

Program	Outgoing coach	Manner of departure	Date of vacancy	Incoming coach	Date of appointment
Brown	Patrick McLaughlin	Not retained	December 31, 2021	Chase Wileman	January 18, 2022
Bucknell	Matt Brown	End of caretaker spell	December 17, 2021	Dave Brandt	December 17, 2021
California	Kevin Grimes	Retired	February 1, 2022	Leonard Griffin	March 31, 2022
Cal Poly	Steve Sampson	Retired	November 3, 2021	Steve Sampson	December 20, 2021
Canisius	Dermot McGrane	Not retained	November 12, 2021	Michael Tanke	February 3, 2022
Chicago State	Trevor Banks	Resigned	February 25, 2022	Norris Howze	June 15, 2022
Delaware	Ian Hennessy	Fired	November 9, 2021	Tommy McMenemy	November 30, 2021
Drake	Gareth Smith	Resigned	November 22, 2021	Pat Flinn	January 5, 2022
East Tennessee State	David Casper	Fired	October 11, 2021	David Lilly	December 3, 2021
Eastern Illinois	Ronnie Bouemboue	Stepped Down	April 25, 2022	Josh Oakley	June 29, 2022
George Mason	Elmar Bolowich	Stepped Down	March 31, 2022	Rich Costanzo	April 29, 2022
Grand Canyon	Leonard Griffin	Hired by California	March 31, 2022	Michael Kraus	May 3, 2022
IUPUI	Brian Barnett	Not retained	November 11, 2021	Sid van Druenen	February 10, 2022
Loyola Chicago	Neil Jones	Hired by Wisconsin	January 10, 2022	Steve Bode	January 20, 2022
Loyola Marymount	Paul Krumpe	Moved to Assistant	March 10, 2022	Kyle Schmid	March 10, 2022
Missouri State	Jon Leamy	Retired	December 31, 2021	Michael Seabolt	January 1, 2022
Northern Kentucky	Stu Riddle	Resigned	December 8, 2021	Tom Poitras	January 13, 2022
Northeastern	Chris Gbandi	Hired by UConn	December 16, 2021	Rich Weinrebe	January 24, 2022
Omaha	Bob Warming	Retired	June 2, 2022	Donovan Dowling	June 28, 2022
Sacred Heart	Joe Barroso	transition to an assistant role	January 21, 2022	Anthony Anzevui	January 21, 2022
UConn	Ray Reid	Retired	December 2, 2021	Chris Gbandi	December 16, 2021
UMass Lowell	Christian Figueroa	Fired	January 5, 2022	Kyle Zenoni	February 17, 2022
UNLV	Rich Ryerson	Resigned	November 14, 2021	B. J. Craig	January 6, 2022
VMI	Max Watson	Resigned	April 8, 2022	Nick Regan	May 25, 2022
Wisconsin	John Trask	Fired	November 13, 2021	Neil Jones	January 10, 2022
Xavier	Andy Flemming	Mutually Parted Ways	February 18, 2022	John Higgins	March 28, 2022

=== New programs ===
Two members of the NCAA Division II Great Lakes Valley Conference (GLVC) announced in February 2022 that they would reclassify to NCAA Division I as new members of the Ohio Valley Conference (OVC) effective that July. The first to announce was the University of Southern Indiana on February 9. Lindenwood University followed suit on February 23. With the OVC then sponsoring soccer only for women, both schools entered into negotiations with the Summit League, whose men's soccer league included established OVC member Eastern Illinois. The Summit accepted both Lindenwood and Southern Indiana as associate members on May 11.

On May 22, 2022, the ASUN Conference announced that Queens University of Charlotte, then a member of the South Atlantic Conference, would begin its own transition to Division I and become the newest ASUN member.

On April 5, 2022, Stonehill College announced that it had accepted an invitation to join the Northeast Conference and would begin the transition to Division I.

=== Discontinued programs ===
While no schools dropped men's soccer prior to the 2022 fall season, one conference discontinued its men's soccer league. Conference USA had nine men's soccer members in 2021, and had planned to add another such member for 2022, but lost all of them by the end of the 2021–22 school year. First, in April 2022, it was announced that five of its members (Coastal Carolina, Kentucky, Marshall, Old Dominion, and South Carolina) would join the Sun Belt Conference for the fall 2022 season, as would West Virginia, which had previously announced a planned move of men's soccer from the Mid-American Conference to C-USA. One month later, the remaining four members (Charlotte, FIU, Florida Atlantic, and UAB) announced they would join the American Athletic Conference effective fall 2022. Of these last four schools, all but FIU are scheduled to fully join The American in 2023.

The Hartford Hawks will transition to NCAA Division III. However, they continue to honor athletic scholarships previously awarded, and departed the America East Conference to become a Division I independent for the 2022 season. The Hawks will join the D-III Commonwealth Coast Conference in 2023.

In March 2023, St. Francis College, athletically known as St. Francis Brooklyn, announced that it would shut down its entire athletic program at the end of the 2022–23 school year.

=== Conference realignment ===
Twenty-seven schools joined new conferences or became independents, including four schools from Division II which started transitions to Division I this season and one that started a transition from Division I to Division III in the 2021 season.

Incarnate Word (UIW) was an affiliate member of the Western Athletic Conference (WAC) for men's soccer in 2021. They had announced their intent to move their primary conference affiliation from the Southland Conference to the WAC, but on June 24, 2022 announced a reversal of course to retain the Southland Conference as their primary conference. There was no formal announcement that they would discontinue their affiliation with the WAC for men's soccer; however, they were removed from the WAC soccer schedule, and played an independent schedule in the 2022 season.

School	Previous Conference	New Conference
Belmont	SoCon	MVC
Bryant	NEC	America East
Charlotte	C-USA	The American
Chicago State	WAC	MAC
Coastal Carolina	C-USA	Sun Belt
FIU	C-USA	The American
Florida Atlantic	C-USA	The American
Georgia Southern	MAC	Sun Belt
Georgia State	MAC	Sun Belt
Hartford	America East	Independent
Incarnate Word	WAC	Independent
James Madison	CAA	Sun Belt
Kentucky	C-USA	Sun Belt
Lindenwood	GLVC (NCAA D-II)	Summit
Loyola Chicago	MVC	A-10
Marshall	C-USA	Sun Belt
Monmouth	MAAC	CAA
Mount St. Mary's	NEC	MAAC
Old Dominion	C-USA	Sun Belt
Queens	SAC (NCAA D-II)	ASUN
South Carolina	C-USA	Sun Belt
Southern Indiana	GLVC (NCAA D-II)	Summit
Stonehill	NE-10 (NCAA D-II)	NEC
Stony Brook	America East	CAA
UAB	C-USA	The American
UIC	Horizon	MVC
West Virginia	MAC	Sun Belt

=== Other headlines ===
- November 10, 2021—The Utah legislature approved the rebranding of Dixie State University to Utah Tech University. The name change occurred in May 2022, with the change taking legal effect on July 1, 2022. The athletic nickname of Trailblazers was not affected.
- August 12 – The Indiana University and Purdue University systems announced that Indiana University–Purdue University Indianapolis will be dissolved in 2024 and replaced by separate IU- and Purdue-affiliated institutions. The current athletic program, the IUPUI Jaguars, will transfer to the new IU Indianapolis.
- August 31 – The Division I Board of Directors adopted a series of changes to transfer rules.
  - Transfer windows were adopted for all Division I sports. Student-athletes who wish to be immediately eligible at their next school must enter the NCAA transfer portal within the designated period(s) for their sport. For men's soccer, two windows were established—a 45-day winter window starting the day after the NCAA tournament selections are announced, and a spring window from May 1–15.
  - Student-athletes who experience head coaching changes, or those whose athletic aid is reduced, canceled, or not renewed, may transfer outside designated windows without penalty.
  - Transferring student-athletes are guaranteed their financial aid at their next school through graduation.
- September 21 – Houston Baptist University announced it had changed its name to Houston Christian University, effective immediately. The athletic nickname of Huskies was not affected.
- November 11 – The Mid-American Conference (MAC) announced that it would no longer sponsor men's soccer after the 2022 season, citing its recent reductions in membership in that sport. Three of the four full MAC members that sponsor men's soccer—Bowling Green, Northern Illinois, and Western Michigan—announced that day that they would become single-sport members of the Missouri Valley Conference effective in 2023.
- November 16 – The Big East Conference announced that Akron, the last full MAC member that had yet to announce a men's soccer affiliation beyond 2022, would join Big East men's soccer effective with the 2023 season. At that time, the Big East, whose 11 full members all sponsor men's soccer, split into divisions for that sport.

== Season outlook ==
=== Preseason polls ===
United Soccer Coaches released their preseason poll on August 2, 2022. College Soccer News released their preseason poll on August 18, 2022. TopDrawer Soccer released their rankings on August 19, 2022.

United Soccer Coaches
Rank	Team
1	Clemson
2	Georgetown
3	Washington
4	Notre Dame
5	Oregon State
6	West Virginia
7	Pittsburgh
8	Kentucky
9	New Hampshire
10	Saint Louis
11	Tulsa
12	Duke
13	Indiana
14	Marshall
15	Wake Forest
16	Providence
17	Hofstra
18	FIU
19	Missouri State
20	Maryland
21	Penn State
22	Santa Clara
23	UCLA
24	North Carolina
T-25	Bowling Green
T-25	Campbell

Top Drawer Soccer
Rank	Team
1	Clemson
2	Washington
3	Notre Dame
4	Georgetown
5	Oregon State
6	Providence
7	West Virginia
8	Indiana
9	Pittsburgh
10	Saint Louis
11	Duke
12	SMU
13	Tulsa
14	Penn State
15	Kentucky
16	New Hampshire
17	Maryland
18	Hofstra
19	Wake Forest
20	UCLA
21	Missouri State
22	Campbell
23	FIU
24	Santa Clara
25	St. John's

College Soccer News
Rank	Team
1	Clemson
2	Washington
3	Georgetown
4	Notre Dame
5	West Virginia
6	Oregon State
7	New Hampshire
8	Pittsburgh
9	Saint Louis
10	Kentucky
11	Duke
12	Tulsa
13	Hofstra
14	Providence
15	Indiana
16	Wake Forest
17	Marshall
18	FIU
19	Virginia Tech
20	Maryland
21	Missouri State
22	Penn State
23	UCLA
24	North Carolina
25	Bowling Green
26	Campbell
27	Santa Clara
28	Denver
29	UNC Greensboro
T-30	Georgia State
T-30	St. John's

== Regular season ==
=== Major upsets ===
In this list, a "major upset" is defined as a game won by an unranked team that defeats a ranked team, or a team ranked 10 spots lower than the other team.

All rankings are from the United Soccer Coaches Poll.

Date	Winner	Score	Loser
August 25	Louisville	3–1	No. 10 Saint Louis
August 25	Seattle	3–1	No. 4 Notre Dame
August 28	Boston University	1–0	No. 9 New Hampshire
August 28	Lipscomb	2–1	No. 10 Saint Louis
August 29	Butler	1–0	No. 14 Marshall
September 2	Saint Louis	3–2	No. 7 Creighton
September 2	Seton Hall	1–0	No. 10 Oregon State
September 3	FIU	2–1	No. 13 North Carolina
September 5	Grand Canyon	3–2	No. 4 UCLA
September 9	Indiana	2–0	No. 9 Akron
September 9	Ohio State	2–0	No. 12 Butler
September 10	Portland	2–0	No. 15 UCLA
September 11	San Diego State	2–1	No. 6 Denver
September 16	FIU	3–0	No. 12 Tulsa
September 16	No. 16 Syracuse	2–1	No. 1 Clemson
September 20	Oregon State	2–1	No. 11 Denver
September 23	No. 25т Louisville	2–1	No. 8 Pittsburgh
September 24	Virginia	1–0	No. 3 Syracuse
September 25	Penn State	1–0	No. 15 Akron
September 25	Tulsa	2–0	No. 12 Charlotte
September 30	Virginia	3–1	No. 10 Pittsburgh
October 4	Cornell	2–1	No. 7 Syracuse
October 9	South Florida	2–1	No. 14 Tulsa
October 11	William & Mary	2–1	No. 10 Wake Forest
October 14	Oregon State	3–2	No. 6 Portland
October 15	Old Dominion	2–1	No. 4 Marshall
October 17	High Point	2–1	No. 7 Maryland
October 21	UCF	2–1	No. 13т Charlotte
October 22	Georgetown	3–0	No. 9 Xavier
October 22	UMBC	2–1	No. 10 Vermont
October 27	Oregon State	2–1	No. 5 Stanford
October 28	Florida Atlantic	2–1	No. 12 SMU
October 28	Wake Forest	3–0	No. 9 Louisville
October 29	Florida Gulf Coast	1–0	No. 10 Lipscomb
October 29	Harvard	3–2	No. 15 Penn
October 29	San Diego	4–1	No. 7 Portland
October 30	Wisconsin	3–2	No. 13 Ohio State
November 2	Virginia Tech	2–1	No. 11 Louisville
November 6	Clemson	2–0	No. 3 Duke
November 6	James Madison	1–0	No. 5 Marshall
November 6	Memphis	2–1 (OT)	No. 13 Tulsa
November 9	Indiana	2–1	No. 6 Maryland
November 10	Albany	1–0	No. 8 Vermont
November 10	Oregon State	1–0	No. 1 Washington
November 10	USF	1–0	No. 13 SMU
November 12	Western Michigan	2–1	No. 15 Akron
November 13	Creighton	3–0	No. 14 Georgetown
November 20	Creighton	3–1	No. 1 Washington
November 20	Pittsburgh	3–0	No. 15 Akron
November 20	Tulsa	1–0 (OT)	No. 14 Georgetown
November 20	Western Michigan	1–0	No. 12 Lipscomb
November 27	Indiana	1–0	No. 9т Marshall
November 27	Pittsburgh	2–1	No. 2 Kentucky
December 3	Creighton	3–2	No. 4 Duke
December 3	Indiana	2–0	No. 7 UNC Greensboro

=== Conference standings ===
2022 ACC men's soccer standings
	Conf.					Overall
Team	W		L		T	W		L		T
Atlantic
No. 1 Syracuse ‡	5	–	1	–	2	18	–	2	–	5
No. 24 Wake Forest +	5	–	3	–	0	14	–	6	–	0
Louisville +	4	–	3	–	1	9	–	6	–	3
No. 13 Clemson +	3	–	4	–	1	13	–	7	–	1
Boston College	1	–	4	–	3	4	–	7	–	5
NC State	1	–	5	–	2	6	–	7	–	5
Coastal
No. 3 Duke +	5	–	0	–	3	13	–	2	–	4
No. 16 Virginia +	5	–	1	–	2	10	–	4	–	5
No. 8 Pittsburgh +	3	–	2	–	3	12	–	5	–	5
North Carolina +	2	–	2	–	4	8	–	6	–	5
Notre Dame	3	–	4	–	1	8	–	7	–	2
Virginia Tech	0	–	8	–	0	3	–	14	–	1
‡ – ACC Tournament champion + – Also invited to the 2022 NCAA tournament; As of December 13, 2022; Rankings from United Soccer Coaches; Source: The ACC

2022 America East Conference men's soccer standings
	Conf.					Overall
Team	W		L		T	W		L		T
No. 21 New Hampshire‡	6	–	1	–	0	15	–	4	–	1
No. 4 Vermont+	5	–	1	–	1	16	–	4	–	2
UMBC	4	–	3	–	0	10	–	6	–	2
Albany	3	–	1	–	3	6	–	8	–	6
Binghamton	3	–	2	–	2	6	–	9	–	4
NJIT	1	–	4	–	2	5	–	8	–	4
UMass Lowell	0	–	4	–	3	2	–	9	–	5
Bryant	0	–	6	–	1	3	–	10	–	1
‡ – Tournament champion + – At-large invitation to the 2022 NCAA Tournament; As of December 13, 2022; Rankings from United Soccer Coaches; Source: America East

2022 American Athletic Conference men's soccer standings
	Conf.					Overall
Team	W		L		T	W		L		T
No. 19 FIU‡	6	–	2	–	1	13	–	5	–	2
No. 18 SMU+	6	–	3	–	0	10	–	6	–	1
South Florida+	5	–	1	–	3	9	–	7	–	4
No. 15 Tulsa+	5	–	3	–	1	10	–	5	–	2
Memphis+	5	–	3	–	1	9	–	6	–	4
Charlotte	3	–	4	–	2	9	–	5	–	2
Florida Atlantic	3	–	4	–	2	4	–	9	–	3
UCF	3	–	6	–	0	6	–	7	–	0
UAB	1	–	5	–	3	3	–	9	–	4
Temple	1	–	7	–	1	4	–	9	–	3
‡ – Tournament champion + – At-large invitation to the 2022 NCAA tournament; As of December 13, 2022; Rankings from United Soccer Coaches; Source: The American

2022 ASUN Conference men's soccer standings
	Conf.					Overall
Team	W		L		T	W		L		T
No. 22 Lipscomb‡	7	–	1	–	0	14	–	3	–	2
Central Arkansas	5	–	1	–	2	6	–	5	–	6
Stetson	4	–	2	–	2	6	–	3	–	7
Florida Gulf Coast	3	–	2	–	3	8	–	5	–	4
North Florida	3	–	3	–	2	4	–	8	–	4
Bellarmine ^{#}	2	–	3	–	3	6	–	4	–	8
Liberty	1	–	4	–	3	3	–	6	–	6
Queens ^{#}	1	–	5	–	2	4	–	10	–	2
Jacksonville	0	–	5	–	3	3	–	8	–	4
‡ – 2022 ASUN Tournament champion + – At-large invitation to the 2022 NCAA Tournament ^{#} – Ineligible for post-season (In transition); As of December 13, 2022; Rankings from United Soccer Coaches; Source: ASUN

2022 Atlantic 10 Conference men's soccer standings
	Conf.					Overall
Team	W		L		T	W		L		T
No. 25 Saint Louis‡	6	–	1	–	1	12	–	5	–	3
Duquesne	4	–	1	–	3	11	–	4	–	4
VCU	3	–	1	–	4	3	–	8	–	6
Dayton	3	–	2	–	3	10	–	2	–	5
Loyola Chicago	3	–	2	–	3	9	–	2	–	7
George Washington	4	–	4	–	0	8	–	8	–	2
UMass	2	–	1	–	5	7	–	4	–	7
La Salle	3	–	3	–	2	5	–	9	–	4
Rhode Island	2	–	2	–	4	6	–	3	–	7
Saint Joseph's	2	–	2	–	4	3	–	6	–	8
Davidson	3	–	4	–	1	6	–	8	–	3
Fordham	1	–	2	–	5	3	–	4	–	9
George Mason	1	–	6	–	1	2	–	11	–	2
St. Bonaventure	0	–	6	–	2	3	–	10	–	3
‡ – 2022 Atlantic 10 Tournament champion + – At-large invitation to the 2022 NCAA Tournament; As of December 13, 2022; Rankings from United Soccer Coaches; Source: Atlantic 10

2022 Big East Conference men's soccer standings
	Conf.					Overall
Team	W		L		T	W		L		T
No. 20 Georgetown+	8	–	1	–	1	12	–	6	–	3
Seton Hall+	4	–	1	–	5	7	–	4	–	7
Xavier	3	–	1	–	6	9	–	2	–	7
Butler	4	–	3	–	3	10	–	6	–	3
Providence	3	–	2	–	5	5	–	5	–	7
No. 9 Creighton‡	3	–	3	–	4	13	–	5	–	6
UConn	3	–	4	–	3	7	–	7	–	3
St. John's	2	–	4	–	4	4	–	8	–	5
DePaul	1	–	4	–	5	4	–	6	–	7
Villanova	2	–	6	–	2	6	–	8	–	3
Marquette	1	–	5	–	4	5	–	9	–	4
‡ – 2022 Big East Tournament champion + – At-large invitation to the 2022 NCAA tournament; As of December 13, 2022; Rankings from United Soccer Coaches; Source: Big East

2022 Big South Conference men's soccer standings
	Conf.					Overall
Team	W		L		T	W		L		T
Campbell	6	–	1	–	1	11	–	4	–	5
High Point‡	5	–	0	–	3	11	–	5	–	5
USC Upstate	4	–	1	–	3	6	–	6	–	5
Presbyterian	3	–	3	–	2	10	–	5	–	2
Gardner–Webb	2	–	2	–	4	7	–	5	–	4
Radford	3	–	4	–	1	4	–	10	–	2
Winthrop	2	–	5	–	1	3	–	13	–	1
UNC Asheville	1	–	4	–	3	2	–	11	–	4
Longwood	0	–	6	–	2	2	–	10	–	5
‡ – 2022 Big South Tournament champion + – At-large invitation to the 2022 NCAA Tournament; As of December 13, 2022; Rankings from United Soccer Coaches; Source: Big South

2022 Big Ten Conference men's soccer standings
	Conf.					Overall
Team	W		L		T	W		L		T
No. 17 Maryland+	4	–	0	–	4	11	–	4	–	5
Ohio State+	4	–	2	–	2	11	–	3	–	6
Rutgers ‡	4	–	2	–	2	10	–	5	–	6
No. 2 Indiana+	3	–	1	–	4	14	–	4	–	7
Penn State	3	–	2	–	3	6	–	6	–	4
Wisconsin	3	–	4	–	1	6	–	6	–	4
Michigan State	3	–	4	–	1	6	–	9	–	2
Northwestern	1	–	5	–	2	3	–	9	–	5
Michigan	1	–	6	–	1	4	–	10	–	3
‡ – 2022 B1G Tournament champion + – At-large invitation to the 2022 NCAA tournament; As of December 13, 2022; Rankings from United Soccer Coaches; Source: Big Ten

2022 Big West Conference men's soccer standings
	Conf.					Overall
Team	W		L		T	W		L		T
UC Riverside‡	5	–	2	–	2	8	–	8	–	4
UC Santa Barbara	4	–	1	–	4	10	–	4	–	6
Cal State Northridge	5	–	3	–	1	9	–	6	–	4
UC Irvine	5	–	3	–	1	6	–	12	–	2
UC Davis	4	–	3	–	2	5	–	9	–	4
Sacramento State	4	–	5	–	0	9	–	8	–	2
Cal State Fullerton	3	–	3	–	3	8	–	6	–	5
UC San Diego ^{#}	4	–	5	–	0	8	–	8	–	2
Cal Poly	2	–	3	–	4	2	–	11	–	4
Cal State Bakersfield	0	–	8	–	1	2	–	13	–	2
‡ – 2022 Big West Tournament champion + – At-large invitation to the 2022 NCAA Tournament ^{#} – Ineligible for post-season (In transition); As of December 13, 2022; Rankings from United Soccer Coaches; Source: Big West

2022 Colonial Athletic Association men's soccer standings
	Conf.					Overall
Team	W		L		T	W		L		T
Elon+	6	–	1	–	2	11	–	5	–	3
UNC Wilmington	5	–	1	–	3	6	–	4	–	7
Hofstra‡	5	–	2	–	2	14	–	4	–	3
Northeastern	4	–	4	–	1	6	–	9	–	3
Drexel	3	–	3	–	3	7	–	5	–	6
William & Mary	3	–	3	–	3	5	–	7	–	6
College of Charleston	3	–	4	–	2	5	–	7	–	5
Stony Brook	3	–	6	–	0	5	–	11	–	0
Monmouth	2	–	6	–	1	7	–	7	–	1
Delaware	2	–	6	–	1	4	–	11	–	2
‡ – 2022 CAA Tournament champion + – At-large invitation to the 2022 NCAA Tournament; As of December 13, 2022; Rankings from United Soccer Coaches; Source: CAA

2022 Horizon League men's soccer standings
	Conf.					Overall
Team	W		L		T	W		L		T
Cleveland State‡	5	–	1	–	3	11	–	4	–	5
Wright State	4	–	1	–	4	4	–	7	–	6
IUPUI	4	–	2	–	3	7	–	7	–	6
Oakland	4	–	2	–	3	4	–	10	–	5
Robert Morris	4	–	3	–	2	6	–	7	–	3
Detroit Mercy	3	–	2	–	4	4	–	7	–	6
Green Bay	2	–	2	–	5	6	–	3	–	7
Northern Kentucky	2	–	6	–	1	4	–	11	–	2
Milwaukee	0	–	4	–	5	1	–	8	–	8
Purdue Fort Wayne	1	–	6	–	2	2	–	10	–	3
‡ – 2022 Horizon Tournament champion + – At-large invitation to the 2022 NCAA Tournament; As of December 13, 2022; Rankings from United Soccer Coaches; Source: Horizon

2022 Ivy League men's soccer standings
	Conf.					Overall
Team	W		L		T	W		L		T
Penn†	6	–	1	–	0	13	–	3	–	2
No. 14 Cornell+	5	–	1	–	1	14	–	3	–	1
Harvard	3	–	1	–	3	9	–	4	–	4
Dartmouth	3	–	4	–	0	6	–	7	–	3
Yale	2	–	3	–	2	7	–	4	–	5
Princeton	1	–	3	–	3	6	–	6	–	4
Columbia	0	–	3	–	4	1	–	9	–	6
Brown	0	–	4	–	3	8	–	6	–	3
† – Conference champion + – At-large invitation to the 2022 NCAA Tournament; As of December 13, 2022; Rankings from United Soccer Coaches; Source: Ivy League

2022 Metro Atlantic Athletic Conference men's soccer standings
	Conf.					Overall
Team	W		L		T	W		L		T
Quinnipiac‡	6	–	2	–	2	13	–	5	–	3
Iona	5	–	1	–	4	7	–	5	–	5
Manhattan	5	–	1	–	4	8	–	5	–	6
Siena	4	–	2	–	4	8	–	5	–	6
Niagara	4	–	2	–	4	5	–	9	–	6
Fairfield	4	–	5	–	1	8	–	10	–	1
Marist	3	–	4	–	3	7	–	6	–	4
Rider	2	–	3	–	5	3	–	8	–	6
Mount St. Mary's	3	–	5	–	1	7	–	8	–	1
Saint Peter's	2	–	5	–	3	3	–	10	–	4
Canisius	0	–	7	–	3	1	–	10	–	6
‡ – 2022 MAAC Tournament champion + – At-large invitation to the 2022 NCAA Tournament; As of December 13, 2022; Rankings from United Soccer Coaches; Source: MAAC

2022 Mid-American Conference men's soccer standings
	Conf.					Overall
Team	W		L		T	W		L		T
No. 23 Akron+	5	–	0	–	3	11	–	4	–	5
Western Michigan‡	5	–	1	–	2	16	–	3	–	2
Bowling Green	4	–	2	–	2	6	–	5	–	5
Northern Illinois	2	–	5	–	1	5	–	8	–	4
Chicago State	0	–	8	–	0	1	–	13	–	3
‡ – 2022 MAC Tournament champion + – At-large invitation to the 2022 NCAA Tournament; As of December 13, 2022; Rankings from United Soccer Coaches; Source: MAC

2022 Missouri Valley Conference men's soccer standings
	Conf.					Overall
Team	W		L		T	W		L		T
Missouri State‡	6	–	0	–	2	12	–	2	–	4
Drake	5	–	2	–	1	7	–	4	–	4
Evansville	3	–	2	–	3	8	–	5	–	6
Belmont	2	–	2	–	4	7	–	4	–	7
UIC	3	–	4	–	1	5	–	9	–	2
SIU Edwardsville	2	–	6	–	0	5	–	9	–	2
Bradley	1	–	6	–	1	5	–	11	–	3
‡ – 2022 MVC Tournament champion + – At-large invitation to the 2022 NCAA tournament; As of December 13, 2022; Rankings from United Soccer Coaches; Source: MVC

2022 Northeast Conference men's soccer standings
	Conf.					Overall
Team	W		L		T	W		L		T
Fairleigh Dickinson‡	6	–	0	–	2	10	–	6	–	3
Merrimack ^{#}	5	–	2	–	1	8	–	6	–	3
St. Francis Brooklyn	4	–	1	–	3	8	–	5	–	6
Sacred Heart	4	–	3	–	1	7	–	9	–	1
Saint Francis (PA)	3	–	2	–	3	6	–	6	–	4
LIU	3	–	4	–	1	9	–	6	–	2
Stonehill ^{#}	1	–	5	–	2	3	–	12	–	2
Howard	1	–	5	–	2	2	–	11	–	2
Central Connecticut	1	–	6	–	1	3	–	11	–	1
‡ – 2022 NEC Tournament champion + – At-large invitation to the 2022 NCAA Tournament ^{#} – Ineligible for post-season (In transition); As of December 13, 2022; Rankings from United Soccer Coaches; Source: NEC

2022 Patriot League men's soccer standings
	Conf.					Overall
Team	W		L		T	W		L		T
Army	5	–	1	–	3	8	–	4	–	5
Boston University	4	–	2	–	3	6	–	5	–	7
Colgate	3	–	1	–	5	7	–	4	–	7
Navy‡	3	–	1	–	5	7	–	5	–	9
Lafayette	3	–	2	–	4	9	–	6	–	4
American	3	–	4	–	2	8	–	7	–	5
Loyola (MD)	2	–	2	–	5	4	–	5	–	8
Lehigh	2	–	5	–	2	3	–	10	–	3
Bucknell	2	–	5	–	2	3	–	12	–	2
Holy Cross	1	–	5	–	3	5	–	9	–	4
‡ – 2022 Patriot Tournament Champion + – At-large invitation to the 2022 NCAA Tournament; As of December 13, 2022; Rankings from United Soccer Coaches; Source: Patriot League

2022 Pac-12 Conference men's soccer standings
	Conf.					Overall
Team	W		L		T	W		L		T
No. 11 Washington†	7	–	1	–	2	15	–	2	–	3
No. 7 Stanford+	4	–	2	–	4	12	–	2	–	6
Oregon State+	3	–	1	–	5	7	–	4	–	6
UCLA+	4	–	4	–	1	12	–	7	–	1
San Diego State	1	–	6	–	3	5	–	9	–	4
California	1	–	6	–	3	3	–	8	–	6
† – Conference champion + – At-large invitation to the 2022 NCAA tournament; As of December 13, 2022; Rankings from United Soccer Coaches; Source: Pac-12

2022 Southern Conference men's soccer standings
	Conf.					Overall
Team	W		L		T	W		L		T
No. 5 UNC Greensboro‡	4	–	0	–	1	13	–	2	–	6
East Tennessee State	3	–	1	–	1	8	–	6	–	3
Mercer	2	–	1	–	2	8	–	5	–	6
Wofford	2	–	2	–	1	6	–	9	–	2
Furman	1	–	3	–	1	7	–	7	–	4
VMI	0	–	5	–	0	2	–	14	–	1
‡– SoCon Tournament Champion + – At-large invitation to the 2022 NCAA Tournament; As of December 13, 2022; Rankings from United Soccer Coaches; Source: SoCon

2022 Summit League men's soccer standings
	Conf.					Overall
Team	W		L		T	W		L		T
Oral Roberts	7	–	1	–	0	11	–	4	–	2
Denver‡	6	–	0	–	2	14	–	3	–	5
Omaha	5	–	2	–	1	8	–	6	–	2
Kansas City	4	–	1	–	3	7	–	5	–	5
Western Illinois	2	–	3	–	3	2	–	8	–	7
St. Thomas ^{#}	2	–	5	–	1	3	–	12	–	2
Southern Indiana ^{#}	2	–	5	–	1	2	–	12	–	3
Lindenwood ^{#}	2	–	6	–	0	3	–	11	–	1
Eastern Illinois	0	–	7	–	1	1	–	12	–	3
‡ – 2022 Summit Tournament Champion + – At-large invitation to the 2022 NCAA tournament ^{#} – Ineligible for post-season (In transition); As of December 13, 2022; Rankings from United Soccer Coaches; Source: Summit

2022 Sun Belt Conference men's soccer standings
	Conf.					Overall
Team	W		L		T	W		L		T
No. 6 Kentucky‡	5	–	0	–	3	15	–	1	–	5
No. 12 Marshall+	4	–	1	–	3	11	–	4	–	4
Georgia State	4	–	2	–	2	12	–	4	–	3
West Virginia	3	–	1	–	4	7	–	7	–	4
Coastal Carolina	2	–	1	–	5	5	–	5	–	6
Old Dominion	3	–	4	–	1	6	–	8	–	2
James Madison	2	–	3	–	3	8	–	8	–	4
South Carolina	1	–	4	–	3	5	–	8	–	4
Georgia Southern	0	–	8	–	0	1	–	14	–	1
‡ – 2022 Sun Belt Conference Tournament champion + – At-large invitation to the 2022 NCAA tournament; As of December 13, 2022; Rankings from United Soccer Coaches; Source: Sun Belt

2022 West Coast Conference men's soccer standings
	Conf.					Overall
Team	W		L		T	W		L		T
San Diego†	6	–	0	–	1	8	–	5	–	6
No. 10 Portland+	6	–	1	–	0	15	–	3	–	3
Saint Mary's	2	–	1	–	4	7	–	6	–	5
Loyola Marymount	3	–	3	–	1	9	–	6	–	3
Santa Clara	1	–	2	–	4	4	–	4	–	7
Pacific	2	–	4	–	1	3	–	12	–	2
Gonzaga	0	–	4	–	3	4	–	11	–	3
San Francisco	0	–	5	–	2	7	–	6	–	4
† – Conference champion + – At-large invitation to the 2022 NCAA Tournament; As of November 8, 2022; Rankings from United Soccer Coaches; Source: WCC

2022 Western Athletic Conference men's soccer standings
	Conf.					Overall
Team	W		L		T	W		L		T
Air Force	7	–	1	–	1	8	–	6	–	3
San Jose State	5	–	2	–	2	10	–	5	–	4
Seattle	5	–	4	–	0	7	–	10	–	1
Utah Valley	5	–	4	–	0	7	–	8	–	1
California Baptist†	4	–	3	–	2	10	–	7	–	4
Grand Canyon	4	–	3	–	2	7	–	8	–	3
Texas–Rio Grande Valley	4	–	4	–	1	7	–	7	–	3
Utah Tech ^{#}	2	–	5	–	2	4	–	12	–	2
Houston Christian	1	–	5	–	3	5	–	8	–	6
UNLV	0	–	6	–	3	1	–	9	–	7
† – 2022 WAC Tournament Champion + – At-large invitation to the 2022 NCAA Tournament # – Ineligible (In transition); As of December 13, 2022; Rankings from United Soccer Coaches; Source: WAC

2022 NCAA Division I independents men's soccer records
	Conf.			Overall
Team	W	L	T	W		L		T
Incarnate Word		–		2	–	13	–	1
Hartford		–		0	–	14	–	0

=== Early season tournaments ===
Several universities hosted early season soccer tournaments.

Name	Date(s)	Stadium	City	No. teams	Champion
Duke Tournament	August 25–28	Koskinen Stadium	Durham, NC	4	Elon
Fairfield Inn by Marriott JMU Invitational	August 25–28	Sentara Park	Harrisonburg, VA	4	Drexel
UAB Soccer for the Cure Classic	August 25–28	PNC Field	Birmingham, AL	4	UAB
Wolstein Classic	August 25–28	Jesse Owens Memorial Stadium	Columbus, OH	4	Dayton
Portland Tournament	September 2–5	Merlo Field	Portland, OR	4	
adidas/IU Credit Union Classic	September 3–6	Bill Armstrong Stadium	Bloomington, IN	3	

== Postseason ==
=== Conference winners and tournaments ===
Conference	Regular Season Champion(s)	Tournament Winner	Conference Tournament	Tournament Dates	Tournament Venue (City)
ACC	Atlantic – Syracuse	Syracuse	2022 Tournament	November 2–13	All matches before final: Campus sites, hosted by higher seed Final: WakeMed Soccer Park • Cary, North Carolina
ACC	Coastal – Duke (Note: Top seed in conference tournament.)	Syracuse	2022 Tournament	November 2–13	All matches before final: Campus sites, hosted by higher seed Final: WakeMed Soccer Park • Cary, North Carolina
America East	New Hampshire	New Hampshire	2022 Tournament	November 5–13	Campus sites, hosted by higher seed
American	FIU	FIU	2022 Tournament	November 6–13	First round: Campus sites, hosted by higher seed Remainder: Hosted by regular-season champion
ASUN	Lipscomb	Lipscomb	2022 Tournament	November 5–12	Quarterfinals and semifinals: Campus sites, hosted by top two seeds Final: Hosted by top remaining seed
Atlantic 10	Saint Louis	Saint Louis	2022 Tournament	November 4–13	Campus sites, hosted by higher seed
Big East	Georgetown	Creighton	2022 Tournament	November 5–13	Maryland SoccerPlex • Boyds, Maryland
Big South	Campbell	High Point	2022 Tournament	November 6–12	Campus sites, hosted by higher seed
Big Ten	Maryland	Rutgers	2022 Tournament	November 4–13	Campus sites, hosted by higher seed
Big West	UC Riverside	UC Riverside	2022 Tournament	November 2–12	Campus sites, hosted by higher seed
CAA	Elon	Hofstra	2022 Tournament	November 3–12	Quarterfinals and semifinals: Campus sites, hosted by top two seeds Final: Hosted by top remaining seed
Horizon	Cleveland State	Cleveland State	2022 Tournament	November 6–12	Quarterfinals: Campus sites, hosted by higher seed Semifinals and final: Hosted by regular-season champion
Ivy	Penn		No Tournament		
MAAC	Quinnipiac	Quinnipiac	2022 Tournament	November 6–12	Campus sites, hosted by higher seed
MAC	Akron	Western Michigan	2022 Championship Game	November 12	Campus site, hosted by regular-season champion
Missouri Valley	Missouri State	Missouri State	2022 Tournament	November 6–13	Quarterfinals: Campus sites, hosted by higher seed Semifinals and final: Hosted by regular-season champion
Northeast	Fairleigh Dickinson	Fairleigh Dickinson	2022 Tournament	November 6–13	Campus sites, hosted by higher seed
Pac-12	Washington		No Tournament		
Patriot	Army	Navy	2022 Tournament	November 5–12	Campus sites, hosted by higher seed
SoCon	UNC Greensboro	UNC Greensboro	2022 Tournament	November 4–12/13	Campus sites, hosted by higher seed
The Summit	Oral Roberts	Denver	2022 Tournament	November 10–12	DU Soccer Stadium • Denver, Colorado
Sun Belt	Kentucky	Kentucky	2022 Tournament	November 6–13	Quarterfinals and semifinals: Campus sites, hosted by top two seeds Final: Hosted by top remaining seed
WCC	San Diego		No Tournament		
WAC	Air Force	California Baptist	2022 Tournament	November 9–13	CBU Soccer Stadium • Riverside, California

== Player statistics ==
As of August 26, 2022

=== Goals ===
As of November 2, 2022

Rank	Player	College	Goals
1	(England) Eliot Goldthorp	Hofstra	14
2	(Australia) Finn Ballard McBride	UC Santa Barbara	13
2	(United States) Ryan Becher	UMBC	13
2	(United States) MD Myers	Rutgers	13
5	(United States) Duncan McGuire	Creighton	12
5	(Iceland) Stefan Sigurðarson	Boston College	12
7	(Spain) David Bercedo	Quinnipiac	14
7	(United States) Taylor Calheira	UMBC	11
7	(Germany) Jelldrik Dallmann	Lipscomb	11
7	(United States) Thaddaeus Dewing	Air Force	11

=== Assists ===
As of November 2, 2022

Rank	Player	College	Assists
1	(Germany) Nick Gutmann	Kentucky	14
2	(England) Tom Cooklin	George Washington	13
3	(France) JC Ngando	UNC Greensboro	11
4	(United States) Ryan Becher	UMBC	10
4	(United States) Chris Meyers	Washington	10
4	(Serbia) Filip Mirković	Pittsburgh	10
7	(United States) Shane Anderson	Oral Roberts	9
7	(France) Adam Aoumaich	Marshall	9
7	(New Zealand) Willem Ebbinge	Harvard	9
7	(United States) Dylan Gaither	Mercer	9
7	(Italy) Giorgio Probo	Creighton	9
7	(Denmark) Alexander Stjernegaard	Quinnipiac	9

=== Points ===
As of November 2, 2022. Two points per a goal, and one point per an assist.

Rank	Player	College	Points
1	(United States) Ryan Becher	UMBC	36
2	(England) Eliot Goldthorp	Hofstra	33
3	(United States) MD Myers	Rutgers	30
4	(Spain) David Bercedo	Quinnipiac	28
4	(United States) Taylor Calheira	UMBC	28
4	(England) Shaun Joash	Grand Canyon	28
7	(New Zealand) Finn Ballard McBride	UC Santa Barbara	27
8	(United States) Duncan McGuire	Creighton	26
8	(United States) Lucas Meek	Washington	26
10	(Iceland) Stefan Sigurðarson	Boston College	25
10	(United States) Thaddaeus Dewing	Air Force	25
10	(New Zealand) Kieran Richards	East Tennessee State	25
10	(United States) Charlie Sharp	Western Michigan	25

=== Hat tricks ===
As of August 26, 2022

Player	For	Against	Score	Date
(United States) Duncan McGuire	Creighton	Oakland	6–0 (H)	August 25, 2022
(United States) Jose Ortiz	SMU	Oral Roberts	4–0 (H)	August 25, 2022
(Germany) Milo Yosef	Marshall	VCU	5–0 (H)	August 25, 2022
(United States) Spencer Hanks	UMBC	Fairfield	8–2 (H)	August 26, 2022
(Poland) Jakub Woznicki	Stonehill	La Salle	3–5 (A)	August 26, 2022
(England) Sam Pitts-Eckersall	UNC Asheville	Georgia Southern	5–3 (H)	August 28, 2022
(United States) Harrison Coron ^{4}	Drexel	College of Charleston	5–0 (H)	September 24, 2022

== Awards and honors ==
=== TopDrawerSoccer.com Player/Team of the Week ===
- **Bold** denotes TDS Player of the Week.

TopDrawer Soccer Team of the Week
Week	Goalkeeper	Defenders	Midfielders	Forwards	Bench
Aug. 30	(United States) Cole Jensen (Xavier)	(United States) Evan Morrison (Boston U) (United States) Tommy Silva (UCLA) (United States) Bryce Lebel (Louisville) (United States) **Duncan McGuire** (Creighton)	(France) Kemy Amiche (Campbell) (Senegal) Ousmane Sylla (Clemson) (Ghana) Shak Mohammed (Duke)	(United States) Tony Pineda (High Point) (France) Bertin Jacquesson (Pittsburgh) (United States) Jack Finnegan (Wisconsin)	(Nigeria) Diba Nwegbo (William & Mary) (England) Tom Cooklin (George Washington) (Ghana) Josh Bolma (Maryland) (United States) Conor Kelly (NC State) (England) Sam Pitts-Eckersall (UNC Asheville) (Spain) Jose Contell (UCLA) (Sweden) Oscar Sears (Wake Forest) (United States) Declan McGlynn (Seattle U) (United States) Aaron Edwards (UCLA)
Sep. 6	(South Korea) Kevin Harr (FIU)	(Spain) Alberto Suárez (Saint Louis) (Germany) Luca Dähn (Seton Hall) (Canada) Nathan Simeon (San Francisco)	(Norway) Knut Ahlander (SMU) (United States) Riley Ferch (UCLA) (United States) Antek Sienkiel (St. John's)	(Jamaica) Matthew Bell (Marshall) (Canada) Stephen Afrifa (FIU) (United States) **Ilijah Paul** (Washington)	(United States) Kameron Blaise (Stony Brook) (United States) Steven Hernandez (UNCG) (Spain) Álvaro Gómez (Clemson) (United States) Taylor Calheira (UMBC) (Japan) Liam Doyle (Stanford) (Paraguay) Gabriel Perrotta (UNCW) (United States) Sam Bassett (Denver) (United States) Chandler Hallwood (Seton Hall) (Colombia) Daniel Hernandez (Campbell) (United States) Justin Faison (Sacramento State)
Sep. 13	(Australia) Domenic Nascimben (Duquesne)	(United States) Nick Atkinson (Army) (United States) Joey Akpunonu (Bowling Green) (Greece) Elias Katsaros (San Diego State)	(Australia) Max Rogers (Yale) (Canada) Malcolm Johnston (Maryland) (Ghana) Shak Mohammed (Duke) (Canada) **Brandon Cambridge** (Portland)	(South Africa) Marco Afonso (UNCG) (England) Eliot Goldthorp (Hofstra) (Estonia) Alex Meinhard (Tulsa)	(Norway) Thomas Storodegard (Siena) (Australia) Aedon Kyra (FGCU) (United States) Francisco Magana (Sacramento State) (United States) Lawrence Aydlett (Lafayette) (United States) Jack Ostrosky (Holy Cross) (United States) Simon Jillson (Loyola Chicago) (Norway) Vemund Vik (Elon) (Australia) Henry Davies (UCSB) (Germany) Giona Leibola (Syracuse)
Sep. 20	(United States) Dominic Peters (UCSD)	(Canada) Nathan Simeon (San Francisco) (United States) Brandon Knapp (St. John's) (Denmark) Kasper Lehm (Elon) (France) Hugo Le Guennec (Rutgers)	(United States) Cameron Wheeler (Xavier) (New Zealand) Xavier Green (Ohio State) (Ghana) KK Baffour (Notre Dame)	(Canada) Stephen Afrifa (FIU) (United States) Jack Sarkos (Lehigh) (Canada) **Levonte Johnson** (Syracuse)	(Italy) Leonardo D'Ambrosio (Charleston) (United States) Kyle Cusimano (Bowling Green) (United States) Eoin Martin (Lafayette) (United States) Greg Monroe (Siena) (United States) Cristiano Bruletti (South Carolina) (Spain) Nacho Diaz (Evansville) (United States) Colin Thomas (Wake Forest) (United States) John Klein (Saint Louis) (Denmark) Lasse Laursen (Charlotte) (United States) Ilijah Paul (Washington)
Sep. 27	(United States) Sebastian Conlon (James Madison)	(United States) Keegan Hughes (Stanford) (United States) Alex Mirsberger (Marquette) (England) Lewis Green (Missouri State)	(United States) Eric Conerty (Western Michigan) (United States) Harrison Coron (Drexel) (United States) Lucas Meek (Washington) (Norway) Knut Ahlander (SMU)	(Norway) Eythor Bjørgolfsson (Kentucky) (United States) Palmer Ault (Butler) (Sweden) CJ Tibbling (Portland)	(Mexico) Beto Anaya (Bowling Green) (Ghana) Shak Mohammed (Duke) (Haiti) Vladimir Walent (Wake Forest) (Cyprus) Konstantinos Michaelides (UCLA) (Netherlands) Wessel Speel (Hofstra) (France) Kemy Amiche (Campbell) (United States) Kris Shakes (Penn State) (United States) Tyger Evans (Penn State) (Spain) Álex López (Tulsa) (United States) Manny Day (Dayton)

=== All-America teams ===
**2022 United Soccer Coaches All-America Teams**
First Team	Second Team	Third Team
Casper Mols, GK, Kentucky; Luis Grassow, DF, Kentucky; Noah Gulden, DF, Lipscomb; Keegan Hughes, DF, Stanford; Knut Ahlander, MF, SMU; Alex Nagy, MF, Vermont; JC Ngando, MF, UNC Greensboro; Peter Stroud, MF, Duke; Eythor Bjorgolfsson, FW, Kentucky; Levonte Johnson, FW, Syracuse; Shak Mohammed, FW, Duke; Ilijah Paul, FW, Washington	Eliot Hamill, GK, Duke; Moise Bombito, DF, New Hampshire; Leo Burney, DF, Penn; Daniel Nimick, DF, Western Michigan; Daniel Wu, DF, Georgetown; Emeka Eneli, MF, Cornell; Eliot Goldthorp, MF, Hofstra; Milo Yosef, MF, Marshall; Stephen Afrifa, FW, FIU; Stas Korzeniowski, FW, Penn; Duncan McGuire, FW, Creighton	Cole Jensen, GK, Xavier; Mariano Fazio, DF, Tulsa; Daniel Munie, DF, Indiana; Nick Richardson, DF, Maryland; Yannick Bright, MF, New Hampshire; Dyson Clapier, MF, Akron; Lucas Meek, MF, Washington; Laurence Wootton, MF, Ohio State; Nicolo Mulatero, FW, Missouri State; Valentin Noel, FW, Pittsburgh; Nathan Opoku, FW, Syracuse; Tyrese Spicer, FW, Lipscomb

=== Major player of the year awards ===
- Hermann Trophy: Duncan McGuire, Creighton
- TopDrawerSoccer.com National Player of the Year Award: Duncan McGuire, Creighton

=== Other major awards ===
- United Soccer Coaches College Coach of the Year: Ian McIntyre, Syracuse
- Bill Jeffrey Award:
- Jerry Yeagley Award: Kristin Acquavella
- Mike Berticelli Award: Felicity Day
- NCAA Tournament MVP:Offensive: Nathan Opoku Defensive: Russell Shealy

=== Conference player and coaches of the year ===
Conference	Conference Player of the Year	Offensive Player of the Year	Defensive Player of the Year	Midfielder of the Year	Goalkeeper of the Year	Rookie of the Year	Conference Coach of the Year
ACC	—N/a	Shak Mohammed (Duke)	Andreas Ueland (Virginia)	Peter Stroud (Duke)	Eliot Hamill (Duke)	Kamran Acito (Duke)	Ian McIntyre (Syracuse)
America East	—N/a	Taylor Calheira (New Hampshire)	Moise Bombito (New Hampshire)	Yannick Bright (New Hampshire)	Nate Silveira (Vermont)	Maximus Barboto (NJIT)	Marc Hubbard (New Hampshire)
American	—N/a	Knut Ahlander (SMU)	Mariano Fazio (Tulsa)	Knut Ahlander (SMU)	Álex López (Tulsa)	Alexander Petraeus (SMU)	Kyle Russell (FIU)
ASUN	Jelldrik Dallmann (Lipscomb)	—N/a	Noah Gulden (Lipscomb)	—N/a	Michael Sibley (Lipscomb)	Nick Dang (Lipscomb)	Charles Morrow (Lipscomb)
Atlantic 10	Alec Hughes (UMass)	John Klein Jr. (Saint Louis)	Alberto Suárez (Saint Louis)	Billy Hency (Loyola Chicago)	—N/a	Basit Umar (Dayton)	Kevin Kalish (Saint Louis)
Big East	—N/a	Duncan McGuire (Creighton)	Daniel Wu (Georgetown)	Aidan Rocha (Georgetown)	Cole Jensen (Xavier)	Palmer Ault (Butler)	Brian Wiese (Georgetown)
Big South	—N/a	Tyler Young (Campbell)	Moses Mensah (Campbell)	—N/a	Holden Trent (High Point)	Jefferson Amaya (High Point)	Zach Haines (High Point)
Big Ten	—N/a	MD Myers (Rutgers)	Daniel Munie (Indiana)	Laurence Wootton (Ohio State)	Keagan McLaughlin (Ohio State)	Cole Curthers (Rutgers); Jonathan Stout (Michigan State)	Sasho Cirovski (Maryland)
Big West	—N/a	Ballard McBride (UC Santa Barbara)	Henry Davies (UC Santa Barbara)	Sebastian Cruz (Cal State Fullerton)	Carlos Gonzalez (UC Riverside); Leroy Zeller (UC Santa Barbara)	David Diaz (Cal State Northridge)	Tim Cupello (UC Riverside)
Colonial	Ryan Carmichael (Hofstra)	—N/a	Vemund Hole Vik (Elon)	—N/a	—N/a	Chris Elliott (Charleston)	Marc Reeves (Elon)
Horizon	Bojan Kolevski (Cleveland State)	Bojan Kolevski (Cleveland State)	Hesron Barry (Green Bay)	—N/a	Tobias Jahn (Green Bay)	Josemir Gomez (IUPUI)	Siniša Ubiparipović (Cleveland State)
Ivy	—N/a	Stas Korzeniowski (Penn)	Leo Burney (Penn)	—N/a	—N/a	Ryan Friedberg (Cornell)	Brian Gill (Penn)
MAAC	—N/a	David Bercedo (Quinnipiac)	Nassim Akki (Manhattan)	—N/a	Greg Monroe (Siena)	Alexander Stjernegaard (Quinnipiac)	Eric Da Costa (Quinnipiac)
Mid-American	Daniel Nimick (Western Michigan)	—N/a	—N/a	—N/a	Brendan Graves (Bowling Green); Hunter Morse (Western Michigan)	Carson Hodgson (Western Michigan)	Jared Embick (Akron)
Missouri Valley	Jesus Barea (Missouri State)	Nicolo Mulatero (Missouri State)	Declan Watters (Drake)	Jack Denton (Missouri State)	Jon Burke (Drake)	Nacho Diaz (Evansville)	Pat Flinn (Drake)
Northeast	Emil Jaaskelainen (LIU)	—N/a	Hugo Bacharach (Fairleigh Dickinson)	—N/a	Spencer King (Fairleigh Dickinson)	Jordaine Jeager (Saint Francis)	Seth Roland (Fairleigh Dickinson)
Pac-12	Joran Gerbet (Oregon State)	Ilijah Paul (Washington)	Keegan Hughes (Stanford)	—N/a	—N/a	CJ Fodrey (San Diego State)	Jamie Clark (Washington)
Patriot	—N/a	Gage Guerra (Army)	Griffin Roach (Boston)	David Jackson (Navy)	Francesco Montali (Boston)	Max Andrews (Army)	Brian Plotkin (Army)
SoCon	JC Ngando (UNC Greensboro)	—N/a	—N/a	—N/a	Cole Hunter (ETSU); Niclas Wild (UNC Greensboro)	Chris Rich (UNC Greensboro)	Nikolai Rojel (Wofford)
Summit	—N/a	Felipe D'Agostini (Oral Roberts)	Ronan Wynne (Denver)	Ben Smith (Denver)	Jeremy Coste (Oral Roberts)	Isaac Nehme (Denver)	Ryan Bush (Oral Roberts)
Sun Belt	Milo Yosef (Marshall)	Milo Yosef (Marshall)	Luis Grassow (Kentucky)	—N/a	Casper Mols (Kentucky)	Matthew Bell (Marshall); Adam Aoumaich (Marshall)	Johan Cedergren (Kentucky)
WAC	—N/a	Shaun Joash (Grand Canyon)	London Aghedo (Air Force)	—N/a	—N/a	Owen Knecht (Utah Valley)	Doug Hill (Air Force)
West Coast	—N/a	Brandon Cambridge (Portland)	Trevor Dillon (San Diego)	Noel Caliskan (LMU)	Jason Dubrovich (San Diego); George Tasouris (Portland)	Simon Duus Muller (San Diego)	Brian Quinn (San Diego)

== See also ==
- College soccer
- List of NCAA Division I men's soccer programs
- 2022 in American soccer
- 2022 NCAA Division I Men's Soccer Tournament
- 2022 NCAA Division I women's soccer season
