= 2022 CAA men's soccer tournament =

- Classification: Division I
- Teams: 6
- Matches: 5
- Attendance: 3,263
- Site: Campus Sites (Higher Seed)
- Champions: Hofstra (6th title)
- Winning coach: Richard Nuttall (6th title)
- MVP: Eliot Goldthorp (Hofstra)
- Broadcast: FloSports

2022 Colonial Athletic Association men's soccer standings
	Conf.					Overall
Team	W		L		T	W		L		T
Elon+	6	–	1	–	2	11	–	5	–	3
UNC Wilmington	5	–	1	–	3	6	–	4	–	7
Hofstra‡	5	–	2	–	2	14	–	4	–	3
Northeastern	4	–	4	–	1	6	–	9	–	3
Drexel	3	–	3	–	3	7	–	5	–	6
William & Mary	3	–	3	–	3	5	–	7	–	6
College of Charleston	3	–	4	–	2	5	–	7	–	5
Stony Brook	3	–	6	–	0	5	–	11	–	0
Monmouth	2	–	6	–	1	7	–	7	–	1
Delaware	2	–	6	–	1	4	–	11	–	2
‡ – 2022 CAA Tournament champion + – At-large invitation to the 2022 NCAA Tournament; As of December 13, 2022; Rankings from United Soccer Coaches; Source: CAA

The 2022 CAA men's soccer tournament was the postseason men's soccer tournament for the Colonial Athletic Association held from November 3 through November 12, 2022. The five-match tournament took place at campus sites, with the higher seed hosting. The six-team single-elimination tournament consisted of three rounds based on seeding from regular season conference play. The defending champions were the Hofstra Pride. They were able to successfully defend their title, defeating the top overall seed, Elon 2–1 in the Final. The conference tournament title was the sixth overall for the Hofstra men's soccer program all of which have come under head coach Richard Nuttall. As tournament champions, Hofstra earned the CAA's automatic berth into the 2022 NCAA Division I men's soccer tournament.

This was the last CAA tournament under the "Colonial Athletic Association" identity. On July 20, 2023, the CAA announced it had changed its name to Coastal Athletic Association.

== Seeding ==
The top six teams in the regular season earned a spot in the tournament. Teams were seeded based on regular season conference record and tiebreakers were used to determine seedings of teams that finished with the same record. A tiebreaker was required to determine the fifth and sixth seeds as Drexel and William & Mary both finished with regular season records of 3–3–3. Drexel earned the fifth seed by virtue of their 4–1 regular season win over William & Mary on September 3.

Seed	School	Conference Record	Points
1	Elon	6–1–2	20
2	UNC Wilmington	5–1–3	18
3	Hofstra	5–2–2	17
4	Northeastern	4–4–1	13
5	Drexel	3–3–3	12
6	William & Mary	3–3–3	12

== Bracket ==
First Round; Thursday, November 3
4	Northeastern	0
5	Drexel	1
3	Hofstra (a.e.t.)	1
6	William & Mary	0

Semifinals; Sunday, November 6
1	Elon	1
5	Drexel	0
2	UNC Wilmington	1
3	Hofstra	2

Final; Saturday, November 12
1	Elon	1
3	Hofstra	2

== Schedule ==
=== First Round ===
November 3	#4 Northeastern	0–1	#5 Drexel	Elon, NC
6:00 p.m. ET	Ahriá Simons (yellow card) 40'; Fraser Brown (yellow card) 54'; Ole Kjorholt (yellow card) 55'; Tobias Wangerud (yellow card) 64'	Report	67' Cesar Banacloy; (yellow card) 85' Youri Senden	Stadium: Rudd Field; Attendance: 177; Referee: Amin Hadzic; Assistant referees: Jude Carr; Hudson Owens; Fourth official: Forrest Ambrose

November 3	#3 Hofstra	1–0 (a.e.t.)	#6 William & Mary	Wilmington, NC
7:00 p.m. ET	Roc Charles (yellow card) 17'; Team (yellow card) 28'; Nico Oberrauch (yellow card) 40'; Oliver Svalander (yellow card) 79'; Ryan Carmichael 103'	Report	(yellow card) 56' Joe Core; (yellow card) 62' Augie Cooper; (yellow card) 107' Diba Nwegbo; (yellow card) 110' Jack Crocco	Stadium: UNCW Soccer Stadium; Attendance: 85; Referee: Izlen Peksenar; Assistant referees: Clive Edwards; Aaron Gallagher; Fourth official: David McPhun

=== Semifinals ===
November 6	#1 Elon	1–0	#5 Drexel	Elon, NC
1:00 p.m. ET	Ben Rosenblatt 21'; Marco Vesterholm (yellow card) 55' (yellow-red card) 89'; Jeppe Jordoson (yellow card) 66'	Report	(yellow card) 13' Cesar Banacloy; (yellow card) 66' Daniel Nesseler; (yellow card) 73' Harrison Coron; (yellow card) 89' Dominick Bachstein	Stadium: Rudd Field; Attendance: 823; Referee: Mike Stutt; Assistant referees: Chris Zuerner; Dustin Thorne; Fourth official: Hicham El Bariqi

November 6	#2 UNC Wilmington	1–2	#3 Hofstra	Wilmington, NC
2:00 p.m. ET	Ethan Newsome 14'; Bachir Ndiaye (yellow card) 52'; Adam Hillis (yellow card) 61'; Angelo Madrid (red card) 74'	Report	31' Marcelo Lage; 75' Eliot Goldthrop; (yellow card) 85' Roc Carles	Stadium: UNCW Soccer Stadium; Attendance: 753; Referee: Richard Crowgey; Assistant referees: Bradley Shrader; Jude Carr; Fourth official: Erick Varone

=== Final ===
November 12	#1 Elon	1–2	#3 Hofstra	Elon, NC
1:00 p.m. ET	Vemund Hole Vik (yellow card) 32'; Scott Vatne (yellow card) 37'; Majaliwa Msabaha (yellow card) 72'; Kasper Lehm 90'	Report	(yellow card) 13' Eliot Goldthorp; 39' Oliver Svalander; 86' Francesco Perinelli	Stadium: Rudd Field; Attendance: 1,425; Referee: Izlen Peksenar; Assistant referees: Kevin Uitto; Gabriel Rivera; Fourth official: Hudson Owens

== Statistics ==
=== Goalscorers ===
There were 9 goals scored in 5 matches, for an average of 1.8 goals per match (as of November 14, 2021).

1 goal

- Ben Rosenblatt – Elon
- Kasper Lehm – Elon
- Cesar Banacloy – Drexel
- Ryan Carmichael – Hofstra
- Eliot Goldthrop – Hofstra
- Marcelo Lage – Hofstra
- Francesco Perinelli – Hofstra
- Oliver Svalander – Hofstra
- Ethan Newsome – UNC Wilmington

== All-Tournament team ==
Player	Team
**Eliot Goldthorp**	Hofstra
Ryan Carmichael	Hofstra
Pierce Infuso	Hofstra
Francesco Perinelli	Hofstra
Franc Gamiz Quer	Elon
Kasper Lehm	Elon
Ben Rosenblatt	Elon
Alessandro Capogna	Drexel
Youri Senden	Drexel
Bachir Ndiaye	UNC Wilmington
Gabriel Perrotta	UNC Wilmington

MVP in bold
