= 2022 Marshall Thundering Herd men's soccer team =

American college soccer season

2022 Marshall Thundering Herd men's soccer

NCAA Tournament, Round of 16
- Conference: Sun Belt
- U. Soc. Coaches poll: No. 12
- TopDrawerSoccer.com: No. 11
- Record: 11-4-4 (4-1-3 SBC)
- Head coach: Chris Grassie (6th season)
- Assistant coaches: Josh Faga (4th season); Rafa Simoes (2nd season); Ian De Oliveira (1st season)
- Home stadium: Veterans Memorial Soccer Complex

2022 Sun Belt Conference men's soccer standings
	Conf.					Overall
Team	W		L		T	W		L		T
No. 6 Kentucky‡	5	–	0	–	3	15	–	1	–	5
No. 12 Marshall+	4	–	1	–	3	11	–	4	–	4
Georgia State	4	–	2	–	2	12	–	4	–	3
West Virginia	3	–	1	–	4	7	–	7	–	4
Coastal Carolina	2	–	1	–	5	5	–	5	–	6
Old Dominion	3	–	4	–	1	6	–	8	–	2
James Madison	2	–	3	–	3	8	–	8	–	4
South Carolina	1	–	4	–	3	5	–	8	–	4
Georgia Southern	0	–	8	–	0	1	–	14	–	1
‡ – 2022 Sun Belt Conference Tournament champion + – At-large invitation to the 2022 NCAA tournament; As of December 13, 2022; Rankings from United Soccer Coaches; Source: Sun Belt

The 2022 Marshall Thundering Herd men's soccer team represented Marshall University in men's college soccer during the 2022 NCAA Division I men's soccer season. It was the 44th season the university fielded a men's varsity soccer program. The Thundering Herd, led by sixth-year head coach Chris Grassie, played their home games at Veterans Memorial Soccer Complex as members of the Sun Belt Conference (SBC).

The Thundering Herd played in the inaugural eight team College Spring League during the 2022 spring season, ultimately winning the championship match held in Columbus, Ohio at Historic Crew Stadium vs. Bowling Green, 2-1.

== Roster ==
Updated September 23, 2022

Note: Flags indicate national team as defined under FIFA eligibility rules; some limited exceptions apply. Players may hold more than one non-FIFA nationality.

No.	Pos.	Nation	Player
0	GK	USA	Aden Mills
1	GK	GER	Oliver Semmle
3	DF	USA	Abdul Barrie
4	DF	ENG	Alex Bamford
5	MF	USA	Ryan Holmes
6	FW	BRA	Guga Veiga
7	FW	GER	Milo Yosef
8	MF	JPN	Taimu Okiyoshi
9	FW	SEN	Ibrahima Diop
10	MF	BRA	Vinicius Fernandes
11	MF	BRA	Joao Souza
12	MF	USA	William Bramback
13	FW	BRA	Kenzo Brito
14	DF	USA	Adam Lubell
16	DF	BRA	Gabriel Alves

No.	Pos.	Nation	Player
17	FW	JAM	Matthew Bell
18	FW	ARG	Augustin Iusem
19	MF	USA	Nikola Sljivic
20	DF	USA	Collin Mocyunas
24	DF	GHA	Mohammed Seidu
25	DF	GER	Morris Duggan
26	FW	ESP	Pablo Aguilera
27	DF	USA	Ethan Prescott
28	DF	USA	Salvatore Saulle
29	GK	USA	Gabe Sitler
31	MF	USA	Stefan Momcilovic
32	MF	JPN	Masaya Sekiguchi
33	FW	FRA	Adam Aoumaich
44	FW	GHA	Alexander Adjetey
47	MF	USA	Marco Silva

== Goal Scorers ==
Rank	Player	Goals
1	Matthew Bell	10
2	Milo Yosef	8
3	Joao Souza	7
4	Adam Aoumaich	2
4	Ryan Holmes	2
4	Taimu Okiyoshi	2
7	Gabriel Alves	1
7	Kenzo Brito	1
7	Morris Duggan	1
7	Vinicius Fernandes	1
7	Agustin Iusem	1
7	Mohammed Seidu	1

== Schedule ==
=== Spring Season ===
March 26, 2022	Dayton Flyers	0-1	Marshall Thundering Herd	Dayton, OH
		Report		Stadium: Baujan Field

April 2, 2022	Marshall Thundering Herd	0-0	Ohio State Buckeyes	Huntington
		Report		Stadium: Veterans Memorial Soccer Complex

April 9, 2022	Marshall Thundering Herd	4-1	Louisville Cardinals	Huntington
11:00 AM EDT				Stadium: Veterans Memorial Soccer Complex

April 16, 2022	Marshall Thundering Herd	2-1	Bowling Green Falcons	Columbus, OH
5:00 PM EDT	Ibrahima Diop; Vinicius Fernandes 67'		Jensen Lukacsko 57'	Stadium: Columbus Crew Stadium

=== Exhibitions ===
August 12, 2021	Rio Grande RedStorm	0–4	No. 14 Marshall Thundering Herd	Rio Grande, OH
7:00 PM EDT		Report		Stadium: Evan E. Davis Field

August 14, 2021	No. 14 Marshall Thundering Herd	4–2	Radford Highlanders	Huntington
8:30 PM EDT		Report		Stadium: Veterans Memorial Soccer Complex

August 19, 2021	No. 20 Maryland Terrapins	2-1	No. 14 Marshall Thundering Herd	College Park, MD
11:00 AM EDT		Report
Note: Teams mutually agreed prior to game to play 3 45 minutes periods. Result indicates first two 45 minutes periods.

=== Regular season ===
August 25, 2022 1	No. 14 Marshall Thundering Herd	5-0	Virginia Commonwealth Rams	Huntington
7:15 PM EDT	Milo Yosef 3', 42', 65'; Joao Souza 57'; Matthew Bell 72'	Report		Stadium: Veterans Memorial Soccer Complex; Attendance: 1,184; Referee: Sorin Stoica; Assistant referees: Kyle Maust, Tim Eller

August 29, 2022 2	Butler Bulldogs	1-0	No. 14 Marshall Thundering Herd	Indianapolis, IN
7:00 PM EDT		Report		Stadium: Sellick Bowl; Referee: Khalaf Al-Latayfeh; Assistant referees: Khalid Falak, Brian Menz
Note: Game stopped twice due to lightning. Game called at 83:35 due to weather.

September 2, 2022 3	No. 11 Marshall Thundering Herd	2-1	No. 2 Pittsburgh Panthers	Huntington
7:15 PM EDT	Matthew Bell 15', 27'	Report	Valentin Noel 72'	Stadium: Veterans Memorial Soccer Complex; Attendance: 1,879; Referee: Brandon Marion; Assistant referees: Edward Kofi, Caleb Perry

September 7, 2022 4	Cleveland State Vikings	1–3	No. 8 Marshall Thundering Herd	Cleveland, OH
7:00 PM EDT	Bojan Kolevski 3'	Report	Joao Souza 22'; Milo Yosef 29'; Matthew Bell 77'	Stadium: Krenzler Field; Attendance: 601; Referee: John Safar; Assistant referees: Vicente Suarez, Joe Semus

September 11, 2022 5	No. 7 Marshall Thundering Herd	7-1	Pacific Tigers	Huntington
1:00 PM EDT	Ryan Holmes 3', 19'; Joao Souza 30'; Kenzo Brito 44'; Augustin Iusem 53'; Matthew Bell 70', 74'	Report	Cooper Riley 13'	Stadium: Veterans Memorial Soccer Complex; Attendance: 1,116; Referee: Aaron Hernandez; Assistant referees: Jeremiah Jemison, Jaclyn Williams

September 16, 2022 6	No. 6 Kentucky Wildcats	1-1	No. 7 Marshall Thundering Herd	Lexington, KY
7:30 PM EDT	Nick Gutmann 53'	Report	Matthew Bell 47'	Stadium: Wendell & Vickie Bell Soccer Complex; Attendance: 2,672; Referee: Chico Grajeda; Assistant referees: Khary Williams, Chad Collins

September 24, 2022 7	No. 4 Marshall Thundering Herd	1–0	West Virginia Mountaineers	Huntington
7:15 PM EDT	Milo Yosef 85'	Report		Stadium: Veterans Memorial Soccer Complex; Attendance: 2,735; Referee: Chico Grajeda; Assistant referees: Khary Williams, Dean Morgan

September 29, 2022 8	Coastal Carolina Chanticleers	0–0	No. 3 Marshall Thundering Herd	Conway, SC
5:00 PM EDT		Report		Stadium: Coastal Carolina Soccer Stadium; Attendance: 123; Referee: David Erbacher; Assistant referees: Thomas Rutherford, Brandon Ingram
Note: Game was advanced a day to avoid the expected arrival of Hurricane Ian.

October 4, 2022 9	No. 6 Marshall Thundering Herd	3-1	Robert Morris	Huntington
7:15 PM EDT	Joao Souza 37'; Matthew Bell 84'; Taimu Okiyoshi 87'	Report	Anass Hadran 85'	Stadium: Veterans Memorial Soccer Complex; Attendance: 1,059; Referee: Michael Nickerson; Assistant referees: Kyle Maust, Adam Walters

October 8, 2022 10	South Carolina Gamecocks	1-3	No. 6 Marshall Thundering Herd	Columbia, SC
7:00 PM EDT	Rocky Perez 88'	Report	Vinicius Fernandez 36'; Pedro Dolabella 69', 79'	Stadium: Stone Stadium; Attendance: 2,431; Referee: Brandon Marion; Assistant referees: Joseph Suchoski, Rick Rogers

October 15, 2022 11	No. 4 Marshall Thundering Herd	1-2	Old Dominion Monarchs	Huntington
7:15 PM EDT	Gabriel Alves 74'	Report	Michael Eberle 16'; Samuel Mar Kristinsson 64'	Stadium: Veterans Memorial Soccer Complex; Attendance: 1,438; Referee: Andrey Caste; Assistant referees: Luke Sobota, Thai Huynh

October 19, 2022 12	Georgia State Panthers	1–1	No. 6 Marshall Thundering Herd	Atlanta, GA
7:00 PM EDT	Jack Hilton-Jones 72'	Report	Adam Aoumaich 52'	Stadium: GSU Soccer Complex; Attendance: 427; Referee: Alexksander Zhelyazkov; Assistant referees: Kevin Huet, Kayla Polonsky

October 23, 2022 13	No. 6 Marshall Thundering Herd	6–1	Georgia Southern Eagles	Huntington
4:00 PM EDT	Morris Duggan 14'; Joao Souza 21'; Taimu Okiyoshi 52'; TEAM 58'; Adam Aoumaich 64'; Milo Yosef 75'	Report	Manuel Prieto 67'	Stadium: Veterans Memorial Soccer Complex; Attendance: 1,453; Referee: Aaron Hernandez; Assistant referees: Don Cooper, Kyle Maust

October 26, 2022 14	Wright State Raiders	0-1	No. 6 Marshall Thundering Herd	Dayton, OH
7:00 PM EDT		Report	Joao Souza 16'	Stadium: Alumni Field; Attendance: 257; Referee: Brandon Klepach; Assistant referees: John Harney, Rob Lowe

November 1, 2022 15	No. 6 Marshall Thundering Herd	2-0	James Madison Dukes	Huntington
7:15 PM EDT	Matthew Bell 44'; Joao Souza 53'	Report		Stadium: Veterans Memorial Soccer Complex; Attendance: 1,675; Referee: Sorin Stoica; Assistant referees: Noah Minor, Jeremiah Jemison

=== Conference Tournament ===
November 6, 2022 Quarterfinals	Marshall Thundering Herd	0-1	James Madison Dukes	Huntington
3:00 PM EST		Report	Clay Obara 43'	Stadium: Veterans Memorial Soccer Complex; Attendance: 1,402; Referee: Matthew Thompson; Assistant referees: Dean Morgan, Khary Williams

=== NCAA Tournament ===
November 17, 2022 First Round	Elon Phoenix	0–1	No. 9 Marshall Thundering Herd	Elon, NC
6:00 p.m. EST	Mason Duval (yellow card) 5'	Report	44' Mohammed Seidu; (yellow card) 67' Ryan Holmes; (yellow card) 80' Adam Aoumaich	Stadium: Rudd Field; Attendance: 1,521; Referee: Carmen Serbio; Assistant referees: Kevin Uitto; Jude Carr; Fourth official: Dustin Thorne

November 20, 2022 Second Round	(4 seed) No. 11 Virginia Cavaliers	1-1 (a.e.t.) (3–5 p)	No. 9 Marshall Thundering Herd	Charlottesville, VA
1:00 PM EST	Reese Miller (yellow card) 15'; Philip Horton 28'; Albin Gashi (yellow card) 64'; Michael Tsicoulias (yellow card) 73'; Jeremy Verley (yellow card) 87'	Report	João Souza (yellow card) 17'; Gabriel Alves (yellow card) 25'; Taimu Okiyoshi (yellow card) 49'; Adam Aoumaich (yellow card) 51'; Matthew Bell 66'	Stadium: Klöckner Stadium; Attendance: 870; Referee: Stephen Foster; Assistant referees: Nicholas Seymour, Jeremy L.B. Smith
	Penalties
	Daniel Mangarov (penalty missed); Philip Horton (penalty scored); Axel Ahlander (penalty scored); Andreas Ueland (penalty scored)		(penalty scored) Oliver Semmle; (penalty scored) Gabriel Alves; (penalty scored) Matthew Bell; (penalty scored) João Souza; (penalty scored) Milo Yosef

November 27, 2022 Third Round	(13 seed) Indiana Hoosiers	1–0	No. 9 Marshall Thundering Herd	Bloomington, IN
6:30 p.m. EST	Herbert Endeley (yellow card) 17'; Brett Bebej 47'; Maouloune Goumballe (yellow card) 68'	Report	(yellow card) 26' Morris Duggan; (yellow card) 73' Mohammed Seidu; (yellow card) 76' Collin Mocyunas	Stadium: Bill Armstrong Stadium; Attendance: 2,161; Referee: Calin Radosav; Assistant referees: Andrew Bigelow; Matthew Rodman; Fourth official: Matthew Geringer

== Awards and honors ==
Recipient	Award	Date	Ref.
Milo Yosef	SBC Offensive Player of the Week	Aug. 30	
Matthew Bell	SBC Offensive Player of the Week	Sept. 6	
Oliver Semmle	SBC Defensive Player of the Week	Sept. 6	
Ryan Holmes	SBC Defensive Player of the Week	Sept. 13	
Oliver Semmle	SBC Defensive Player of the Week	Nov. 3	
Milo Yosef	SBC All-Conference First-Team	Nov. 4	
Matthew Bell	SBC All-Conference First-Team	Nov. 4	
Vinicius Fernandes	SBC All-Conference First-Team	Nov. 4	
Gabriel Alves	SBC All-Conference First-Team	Nov. 4	
Adam Aoumaich	SBC All-Conference Second-Team	Nov. 4	
Oliver Semmle	SBC All-Conference Second-Team	Nov. 4	
Milo Yosef	SBC Player of the Year	Nov. 4	
Milo Yosef	SBC Offensive Player of the Year	Nov. 4	
Matthew Bell	SBC Freshmen of the Year	Nov. 4	
Adam Aoumaich	SBC Newcomer of the Year	Nov. 4	
Gabriel Alves	United Soccer Coaches All-Southeast Region First-Team	Dec. 6	
Matthew Bell	United Soccer Coaches All-Southeast Region First-Team	Dec. 6	
Milo Yosef	United Soccer Coaches All-Southeast Region First-Team	Dec. 6	
Vinicius Fernandes	United Soccer Coaches All-Southeast Region Second-Team	Dec. 6	
Oliver Semmle	United Soccer Coaches All-Southeast Region Second-Team	Dec. 6	
Milo Yosef	MAC Hermann Trophy Semifinalist	Dec. 7	
Milo Yosef	United Soccer Coaches All-America Second Team	Dec. 9	

== Rankings ==
Ranking movements Legend: ██ Increase in ranking ██ Decrease in ranking — = Not ranked
	Week															
Poll	Pre	1	2	3	4	5	6	7	8	9	10	11	12	13	14	Final
United Soccer	14	11	8	7	4	3	6	4	6	6	5	9	N/A	N/A	N/A	12
TopDrawer Soccer	—	18	13	9	9	5	7	4	8	6	5	6	11	8	11	11
College Soccer News	17	12	11	8	8	6	8	4	6	5	5	9	9	N/A	N/A	12

== 2023 MLS Draft ==
Player	Round	Pick	Position	MLS club	Ref.
Oliver Semmle	2	41	GK	Colorado Rapids	
