= 2022 Mid-American Conference men's soccer championship game =

2022 MAC men's soccer championship
Akron	Western Michigan
1	2
- Report
- Date: November 12, 2022; 1 pm EST
- Venue: FirstEnergy Stadium–Cub Cadet Field, Akron, OH
- Man of the Match: Charlie Sharp (Western Michigan)
- Referee: Dimitrios Kastimingos
- Attendance: 942

The 2022 Mid-American Conference men's soccer championship game determined the Mid-American Conference (MAC) soccer champion for the 2022 season. The game, held on November 12, 2022, also determined the MAC's automatic berth into the 2022 NCAA Division I men's soccer tournament. Western Michigan defeated the host Akron 2–1 to secure the automatic bid.

This would be the last-ever match for MAC men's soccer, at least for the foreseeable future. Conference realignment, most notably the decision of the Sun Belt Conference to start a men's soccer league in 2022, caused the MAC to lose three of the seven teams that had played in the conference in the 2021 season, with six teams required to maintain its automatic NCAA tournament bid. The MAC had a two-year window to add a sixth team to maintain its automatic bid in the long term, and brought in Chicago State as its fifth team for the 2022 season. However, the conference was unable to add the needed sixth member, leading it to end sponsorship of men's soccer at the end of the 2022 season.

== Qualification ==
Akron and Western Michigan secured their spots in the Championship game by virtue of 18 pts in conference play and 17 pts in conference play respectively.

== Match ==
The match was hosted by the Akron Zips as the top overall seed.
