= 2022 America East men's soccer tournament =

- Classification: Division I
- Teams: 6
- Matches: 5
- Attendance: 6,490
- Site: Campus Sites (Higher Seed)
- Champions: New Hampshire (4th title)
- Winning coach: Marc Hubbard (4th title)
- MVP: Jassem Koleilat (New Hampshire)
- Broadcast: ESPN+

2022 America East Conference men's soccer standings
	Conf.					Overall
Team	W		L		T	W		L		T
No. 21 New Hampshire‡	6	–	1	–	0	15	–	4	–	1
No. 4 Vermont+	5	–	1	–	1	16	–	4	–	2
UMBC	4	–	3	–	0	10	–	6	–	2
Albany	3	–	1	–	3	6	–	8	–	6
Binghamton	3	–	2	–	2	6	–	9	–	4
NJIT	1	–	4	–	2	5	–	8	–	4
UMass Lowell	0	–	4	–	3	2	–	9	–	5
Bryant	0	–	6	–	1	3	–	10	–	1
‡ – Tournament champion + – At-large invitation to the 2022 NCAA Tournament; As of December 13, 2022; Rankings from United Soccer Coaches; Source: America East

The 2022 America East Conference men's soccer tournament was the postseason men's soccer tournament for the America East Conference held from November 5 through November 13, 2022. The five-match tournament took place at campus sites, with the higher seed hosting. The six-team single-elimination tournament consisted of three rounds based on seeding from regular season conference play. The defending champions were the Vermont Catamounts, who were unable to defend their title, losing in the Semifinals to Albany. New Hampshire went on to win the tournament after a 2–0 victory in the final over Albany. It was the fourth victory for the New Hampshire Wildcats soccer program, all of which have come under Head Coach Marc Hubbard. This was New Hampshire's fourth tournament victory in the last five years. As tournament champions, New Hampshire earned the America East's automatic berth into the 2022 NCAA Division I men's soccer tournament.

== Seeding ==
The top six teams in the regular season earned a spot in the tournament, with the top two seeds receiving byes into the Semifinals. A tiebreaker was required to determine the third and fourth seeds as Albany and UMBC both finished with twelve regular season points. Albany was awarded the third seed by virtue of their 1–0 regular season victory over UMBC on September 24.

Seed	School	Conference Record	Points
1	New Hampshire	6–1–0	18
2	Vermont	5–1–1	16
3	Albany	3–1–3	12
4	UMBC	4–3–0	12
5	Binghamton	3–2–2	11
6	NJIT	1–4–2	5

== Bracket ==
Quarterfinals; Saturday, Nov. 5
4	UMBC	2
5	Binghamton (a.e.t)	3
3	Albany	1
6	NJIT	0

Semifinals; Thursday, Nov. 10
1	New Hampshire	3
5	Binghamton	0
2	Vermont	0
3	Albany	1

Final; Sunday, Nov. 13
1	New Hampshire	2
3	Albany	0

== Schedule ==
=== Quarterfinals ===
November 5	#3 Albany	2–0	#6 NJIT	Albany, NY
4:00 p.m. ET	Mohamed Soumah 74'; Pantelis Panteli 84' (pen.); Jeff Thielmann (yellow card) 85'; Tiago Dias (yellow card) 86'; Domenic Baumann (yellow card) 88'; Saad Faiz (yellow card) 90'	Report	(yellow card) 17' Matt Moran; (yellow card) 48' Hugo Tavares; (yellow card) 84' Karmel Segui; (yellow card) 84' Maximus Barboto; (yellow card) 90' Joseph Davis	Stadium: Casey Stadium; Attendance: 201; Referee: Greg DeMello; Assistant referees: Victor Matheson; Wilmer Melendez; Fourth official: Hao Zhong

November 5	#4 UMBC	2–3 (a.e.t.)	#5 Binghamton	Baltimore, MD
7:00 p.m. ET	Ryan Becher (yellow card) 13'; Ismailcan Usta 13'; Lasse Kelp 69'; Taylor Calheira (yellow card) 70'	Report	(yellow card) 35' Shawn Coles; 36' Will Noecker; (yellow card) 39' Parker McKnight; (yellow card) 61' Carter Beaulieu; 67' Anthony Lazaridis; 99' Markos Touroukis; (yellow card) 102' Carlo Cavalar	Stadium: Retriever Soccer Park; Attendance: 1,623

=== Semifinals ===
November 10	#1 New Hampshire	3–0	#5 Binghamton	Durham, NH
6:00 p.m. ET	Eli Goldman 2'; Moïse Bombito 59'; Paul Mayer 72'	Report	(yellow card) 1' Markos Touroukis	Stadium: Wildcat Stadium; Attendance: 1,694; Referee: Kevin Morrison; Assistant referees: Mounir Idmalak; Ruben Seyde; Fourth official: John Luk

November 10	#2 Vermont	0–1	#3 Albany	Burlington, VT
7:00 p.m. ET		Report	(yellow card) 34' Lucas Watt; 81' Jeff Thielmann	Stadium: Virtue Field; Attendance: 1,532; Referee: Luis Reis; Assistant referees: Jamie Labarge; Anthony Pedolsky; Fourth official: Larry Bechard

=== Final ===
November 13	#1 New Hampshire	2–0	#3 Albany	Durham, NH
2:00 p.m. ET	Eli Goldman 19'; Tola Showunmi 21'; Yannick Bright (yellow card) 53'	Report		Stadium: Wildcat Stadium; Attendance: 1,440; Referee: Adam Kilpatrick; Assistant referees: John Luk; Mounir Idmalak; Fourth official: Ron Libby

== Statistics ==
=== Goalscorers ===
There were 13 goals scored in 5 matches, for an average of 2.6 goals per match (as of November 13, 2022).

2 goals

- Eli Goldman – New Hampshire

1 goal

- Pantelis Panteli – Albany
- Mohamed Soumah – Albany
- Jeff Thielmann – Albany
- Anthony Lazaridis – Binghamton
- Will Noecker – Binghamton
- Markos Touroukis – Binghamton
- Moïse Bombito – New Hampshire
- Paul Mayer – New Hampshire
- Tola Showunmi – New Hampshire
- Lasse Kelp – UMBC
- Ismailcan Usta – UMBC

== All-Tournament team ==
Player	Team
Jamie Davis	New Hampshire
Eli Goldman	New Hampshire
**Jassem Koleilat**	New Hampshire
Johann Von Knebel	New Hampshire
Tiago Dias	Albany
Elias Ehlin	Albany
Neophytos Scottis	Albany
Carter Beaulieu	Binghamton
Will Noecker	Binghamton
Noah Egan	Vermont
Joe Morrison	Vermont
Taylor Calheira	UMBC
Maximus Barboto	NJIT

MVP in bold
