= 2022 Sun Belt Conference men's soccer season =

- League: NCAA Division I
- Sport: Soccer
- Teams: 9

Regular Season

Tournament

Sun Belt Conference men's soccer seasons
- ← 2020 2023 →

2022 Sun Belt Conference men's soccer standings
	Conf.					Overall
Team	W		L		T	W		L		T
No. 6 Kentucky‡	5	–	0	–	3	15	–	1	–	5
No. 12 Marshall+	4	–	1	–	3	11	–	4	–	4
Georgia State	4	–	2	–	2	12	–	4	–	3
West Virginia	3	–	1	–	4	7	–	7	–	4
Coastal Carolina	2	–	1	–	5	5	–	5	–	6
Old Dominion	3	–	4	–	1	6	–	8	–	2
James Madison	2	–	3	–	3	8	–	8	–	4
South Carolina	1	–	4	–	3	5	–	8	–	4
Georgia Southern	0	–	8	–	0	1	–	14	–	1
‡ – 2022 Sun Belt Conference Tournament champion + – At-large invitation to the 2022 NCAA tournament; As of December 13, 2022; Rankings from United Soccer Coaches; Source: Sun Belt

The 2022 Sun Belt Conference men's soccer season was the 20th season of men's varsity soccer in the Sun Belt Conference (SBC), marking the return of SBC men's soccer after a one-season hiatus. The season ended with the 2022 Sun Belt Conference Men's Soccer Tournament.

== Background ==
A major conference realignment initially triggered in July 2021 when Oklahoma and Texas announced their plans to leave the Big 12 Conference for the Southeastern Conference eventually led to the reinstatement of Sun Belt men's soccer. Further moves in this realignment cycle saw three men's soccer schools announce that they would join the SBC no later than 2023: Colonial Athletic Association (CAA) member James Madison, and then-reigning national champion Marshall and Old Dominion from Conference USA (C-USA). Accordingly, league commissioner Keith Gill announced on November 1, 2021, that SBC men's soccer would be reinstated no later than 2023.

Shortly after James Madison announced its departure for the SBC, the CAA invoked a provision of its bylaws to bar JMU from its conference championship events. This led the SBC to announce on February 2, 2022, that JMU would join the conference in July 2022 instead of 2023. The following month saw a legal dispute between C-USA and the three schools set to leave that league for the SBC (Marshall, Old Dominion, and Southern Miss, with Southern Miss sponsoring soccer only for women) over their departure date. On March 29, C-USA and those schools reached a settlement that allowed them to join the SBC in July 2022. A little more than a week later on April 6, the SBC announced that men's soccer would be reinstated in 2022. The three incoming members were joined by existing full members Coastal Carolina, Georgia Southern, and Georgia State plus new associate members Kentucky, South Carolina, and West Virginia.

== Teams ==
=== Stadiums and locations ===
Team	Location	Stadium	Capacity
Coastal Carolina Chanticleers	Conway, South Carolina	Coastal Carolina University Soccer Field	1,000
Georgia Southern Eagles	Statesboro, Georgia	Eagle Field	3,500
Georgia State Panthers	Decatur, Georgia	GSU Soccer Complex	1,892
James Madison Dukes	Harrisonburg, Virginia	Sentara Park	1,500
Kentucky Wildcats	Lexington, Kentucky	Wendell & Vickie Bell Soccer Complex	3,368
Marshall Thundering Herd	Huntington, West Virginia	Veterans Memorial Soccer Complex	1,006
Old Dominion Monarchs	Norfolk, Virginia	Old Dominion Soccer Complex	4,000
South Carolina Gamecocks	Columbia, South Carolina	Stone Stadium	5,700
West Virginia Mountaineers	Morgantown, West Virginia	Dick Dlesk Soccer Stadium	1,600

=== Head coaches ===
Note: All stats current through the completion of the 2021 season

Team	Head coach	Previous job	Years at school	Overall record	Record at school	SBC record	NCAA Tournaments	NCAA College Cups	NCAA Titles
Coastal Carolina	Shaun Docking	Charleston Southern	24	318–159–45 (.652)	298–140–43 (.664)	17–7–1 (.700)	15	0	0
Georgia Southern	John Murphy	Anderson (SC)	7	102–97–25 (.511)	36–53–10 (.414)	10–13–2 (.440)	0	0	0
Georgia State	Brett Surrency	Jacksonville (asst.)	12	123–88–18 (.576)	123–88–16 (.577)	21–11–3 (.643)	3	0	0
James Madison	Paul Zazenski	James Madison (asst.)	5	112–41–14 (.713)	42–18–10 (.671)	0–0–0 (–)	3	0	0
Kentucky	Johan Cedergren	Dartmouth (asst.)	11	116–54–26 (.658)	116–54–26 (.658)	0–0–0 (–)	8	0	0
Marshall	Chris Grassie	Charleston (WV)	6	155–48–22 (.738)	56–28–14 (.643)	0–0–0 (–)	3	1	1
Old Dominion	Alan Dawson	North Carolina (asst.)	25	380–190–57 (.652)	251–160–46 (.600)	0–0–0 (–)	12	0	0
South Carolina	Tony Annan	Atlanta United Academy	2	5–9–2 (.375)	5–9–2 (.375)	0–0–0 (–)	0	0	0
West Virginia	Dan Stratford	Charleston (WV)	3	79–10–12 (.842)	18–6–7 (.694)	0–0–0 (–)	1	0	0

== Preseason ==
=== Recruiting classes ===
Rankings
Team	TDS	CSN	Signees
Coastal Carolina			
Georgia Southern			
Georgia State			
James Madison			
Kentucky			
Marshall			
Old Dominion			
South Carolina			
West Virginia			

=== Preseason Coaches polls ===
The 2022 SBC Preseason Poll was released on August 15, 2022. The league's head coaches ranked West Virginia as the preseason favorite, with 5 out of 9 first place votes. Full results of the poll are shown below:

Predicted finish	Team	Votes (1st place)
1	West Virginia	5
2	Marshall	3
3	Kentucky	1
4	South Carolina	
T-5	Coastal Carolina	
T-5	James Madison	
7	Georgia State	
8	Old Dominion	
9	Georgia Southern	

=== Preseason awards ===
==== All−American Teams ====
USC 1st Team	USC 2nd Team	TDS 1st Team	TDS 2nd Team	CSN 1st Team	CSN 2nd Team

==== Preseason All SBC ====
Position	Player	Class	School
Goalkeeper	Oliver Semmle	5th Year	Marshall
Defender	Luis Grassow	Senior	Kentucky
Defender	Robert Screen	5th Year	Kentucky
Defender	Gabriel Alves	Junior	Marshall
Defender	Bjarne Thiesen	Junior	West Virginia
Midfielder	Ross Finnie	Senior	Georgia State
Midfielder	Rodrigo Robles	Junior	James Madison
Midfielder	Vinicius Fernandes	5th Year	Marshall
Forward	Álvaro García Pascual	Sophomore	Coastal Carolina
Forward	Luca Erhardt	Senior	James Madison
Forward	Eythor Bjorgolfsson	Senior	Kentucky
Forward	Milo Yosef	Senior	Marshall

=== Preseason exhibitions ===
Date	Time	Visiting team	Home team	Site	TV	Result	Attendance	Ref.
August 12	7:00 p.m.	No. 14 Marshall	Rio Grande (OH)	Evan Davis Soccer Field • Rio Grande, OH		Not reported		
August 12	7:00 p.m.	UNCG	Old Dominion	ODU Soccer Complex • Norfolk, VA		T 0–0		
August 12	7:00 p.m.	No. 6 West Virginia	Duquesne	Arthur J. Rooney Athletic Field • Pittsburgh, PA		Not reported		
August 13	7:00 p.m.	James Madison	VCU	Sports Backers Stadium • Richmond, VA	ESPN+	Not reported		
August 14	7:00 p.m.	No. 15 Wake Forest	Coastal Carolina	CCU Soccer Field • Conway, SC		T 1–1		
August 14	7:00 p.m.	Winthrop	Georgia Southern	Eagle Field at Erk Park • Statesboro, GA				
August 14	7:15 p.m.	Radford	No. 14 Marshall	Hoops Family Field • Huntington, WV				
August 16	11:00 a.m.	Richard Bland	Old Dominion	ODU Soccer Complex • Norfolk, VA		W 6–0		
August 16	3:00 p.m.	Navy	James Madison	Sentara Park • Harrisonburg, VA				
August 17	7:00 p.m.	No. 19 Virginia Tech	No. 6 West Virginia	Dick Dlesk Soccer Stadium • Morgantown, WV (Rivalry)	B12N+			
August 19	7:00 p.m.	Georgia Southern	North Georgia	UNG Soccer Field • Dahlonega, GA				
August 19	7:00 p.m.	No. 24 North Carolina	James Madison	Sentara Park • Harrisonburg, VA				
August 19	7:30 p.m.	No. 14 Marshall	No. 20 Maryland	Ludwig Field • College Park, MD	BTN+	L 1–2	2,393	
August 20	7:00 p.m.	NC State	Coastal Carolina	CCU Soccer Field • Conway, SC				
August 20	7:00 p.m.	Old Dominion	UNCW	UNCW Soccer Stadium • Wilmington, NC				
August 20	7:00 p.m.	No. 6 West Virginia	No. 15 Wake Forest	Spry Stadium • Winston-Salem, NC	ACCNX	T 0–0		
^{#}Rankings from United Soccer Coaches. All times are in Eastern Time.

== Regular season ==
The regular season will begin on August 25, 2022.

== Rankings ==
=== National rankings ===
	Improvement in ranking
	Drop in ranking
RV	Received votes but were not ranked in Top 25
NV	No votes received

		Pre	Wk 1	Wk 2	Wk 3	Wk 4	Wk 5	Wk 6	Wk 7	Wk 8	Wk 9	Wk 10	Wk 11	Wk 12	Wk 13	Wk 14	Wk 15	Wk 16	Final
Coastal Carolina	USC	NV	NV	NV	NV	NV	NV	NV	NV	NV					None released				
Coastal Carolina	TDS	NV	NV	NV	NV	NV	NV	NV	NV	NV									
Coastal Carolina	CSN	NV	NV	NV	NV	NV	NV	NV	NV	NV									
Georgia Southern	USC	NV	NV	NV	NV	NV	NV	NV	NV	NV					None released				
Georgia Southern	TDS	NV	NV	NV	NV	NV	NV	NV	NV	NV									
Georgia Southern	CSN	NV	NV	NV	NV	NV	NV	NV	NV	NV									
Georgia State	USC	RV	NV	NV	RV	RV	RV	NV	NV	NV					None released				
Georgia State	TDS	NV	NV	NV	NV	NV	NV	NV	NV	NV									
Georgia State	CSN	30	NV	NV	NV	RV	NV	NV	NV	NV									
James Madison	USC	NV	NV	NV	NV	NV	NV	NV	NV	NV					None released				
James Madison	TDS	NV	NV	NV	NV	NV	NV	NV	NV	NV									
James Madison	CSN	NV	NV	NV	NV	NV	NV	NV	NV	NV									
Kentucky	USC	8	6	5	6	5	5	3	2	2					None released				
Kentucky	TDS	15	11	9	6	6	4	3	3	4									
Kentucky	CSN	10	6	3	5	7	5	5	3	3									
Marshall	USC	14	11	8	7	4	3	6	4	6					None released				
Marshall	TDS	RV	18	13	9	9	5	7	4	8									
Marshall	CSN	17	12	11	8	8	6	8	4	6									
Old Dominion	USC	NV	NV	NV	NV	NV	NV	NV	NV	NV					None released				
Old Dominion	TDS	NV	NV	NV	NV	NV	NV	NV	NV	NV									
Old Dominion	CSN	NV	NV	NV	NV	NV	NV	NV	NV	NV									
South Carolina	USC	NV	NV	NV	NV	NV	NV	NV	NV	NV					None released				
South Carolina	TDS	NV	NV	NV	NV	NV	NV	NV	NV	NV									
South Carolina	CSN	NV	NV	NV	NV	NV	NV	NV	NV	NV									
West Virginia	USC	6	18	23	NV	NV	NV	NV	NV	NV					None released				
West Virginia	TDS	7	4	10	21	NV	NV	NV	NV	NV									
West Virginia	CSN	5	3	29	RV	NV	NV	NV	NV	NV									

=== Regional rankings - USC Southeast Region ===
	Improvement in ranking
	Drop in ranking
RV	Received votes but were not ranked in Top 10
NV	No votes received

The United Soccer Coaches' Southeast region ranks teams across the Atlantic 10 Conferences.

	Wk 1	Wk 2	Wk 3	Wk 4	Wk 5	Wk 6	Wk 7	Wk 8	Wk 9	Wk 10	Wk 11	Wk 12
Coastal Carolina	6	7	NV	NV	NV	NV	NV	NV				
Georgia Southern	NV	NV	NV	NV	NV	NV	NV	NV				
Georgia State	9	6	6	5	5	5	7	6				
James Madison	10	NV	NV	NV	NV	NV	NV	NV				
Kentucky	3	1	2	2	2	1	1	1				
Marshall	1	2	1	1	1	2	2	2				
Old Dominion	NV	NV	NV	NV	NV	NV	NV	10				
South Carolina	NV	NV	9	10	8	7	8	8				
West Virginia	2	5	7	7	NV	NV	NV	NV				

== MLS SuperDraft ==
=== Total picks by school ===
Team	Round 1	Round 2	Round 3	Total
Coastal Carolina	–	–	–	0
Georgia Southern	–	–	–	0
Georgia State	–	–	–	0
James Madison	–	–	1	1
Kentucky	–	3	–	3
Marshall	–	1	–	1
Old Dominion	–	–	–	0
South Carolina	–	–	–	0
West Virginia	–	–	–	0
Total	0	4	1	5

=== List of selections ===
Round	Pick #	MLS team	Player	Position	College
2	38	Seattle Sounders FC	(Norway) Eythor Björgolfsson	FW	Kentucky
2	41	Colorado Rapids	(Germany) Oliver Semmle	GK	Marshall
2	43	Columbus Crew	(United States) Clay Holstad	MF	Kentucky
2	46	Orlando City SC	(Germany) Luis Grassow	DF	Kentucky
3	85	Portland Timbers	(United States) Tyler Clegg	DF	James Madison
