= 2022 ASUN men's soccer tournament =

- Classification: Division I
- Teams: 6
- Matches: 5
- Attendance: 2,063
- Site: Campus Sites
- Champions: Lipscomb (4th title)
- Winning coach: Charles Morrow (4th title)
- MVP: Hayes Wood (Lipscomb)
- Broadcast: ESPN+, YouTube

2022 ASUN Conference men's soccer standings
	Conf.					Overall
Team	W		L		T	W		L		T
No. 22 Lipscomb‡	7	–	1	–	0	14	–	3	–	2
Central Arkansas	5	–	1	–	2	6	–	5	–	6
Stetson	4	–	2	–	2	6	–	3	–	7
Florida Gulf Coast	3	–	2	–	3	8	–	5	–	4
North Florida	3	–	3	–	2	4	–	8	–	4
Bellarmine ^{#}	2	–	3	–	3	6	–	4	–	8
Liberty	1	–	4	–	3	3	–	6	–	6
Queens ^{#}	1	–	5	–	2	4	–	10	–	2
Jacksonville	0	–	5	–	3	3	–	8	–	4
‡ – 2022 ASUN Tournament champion + – At-large invitation to the 2022 NCAA Tournament ^{#} – Ineligible for post-season (In transition); As of December 13, 2022; Rankings from United Soccer Coaches; Source: ASUN

The 2022 ASUN men's soccer tournament was the 44th edition of the postseason men's soccer tournament for the ASUN Conference, held from November 5 through November 12, 2022. All rounds of the tournament were hosted at the first and second seeds home stadiums, with the #1 seed Lipscomb, hosting the Final. The six-team single-elimination tournament consisted of three rounds based on seeding from regular season conference play. The Lipscomb Bison were the defending tournament champions, and were successful in defending their title, defeating second seed Central Arkansas 6–2 in the Final. It was their fourth title in six years, and fourth title in program history for Lipscomb and coach Charles Morrow. As tournament champions, Lipscomb earned the ASUN's automatic berth into the 2022 NCAA Division I men's soccer tournament.

== Seeding ==
The top six teams in the regular season earned a spot in the tournament. Teams were seeded based on regular season conference record and tiebreakers were used to determine seedings of teams that finished with the same record. No tiebreakers were required as the top six teams in conference play finished with unique regular season records.

Seed	School	Conference Record	Points
1	Lipscomb	7–1–0	21
2	Central Arkansas	5–1–2	17
3	Stetson	4–2–2	14
4	Florida Gulf Coast	3–2–3	12
5	North Florida	3–3–2	11
6	Bellarmine	2–3–3	9

== Bracket ==
First round Saturday, Nov. 5
4	Florida Gulf Coast	4
5	North Florida	0
3	Stetson	2 (0)
6	Bellarmine (pen.)	2 (3)

Semifinals; Monday, Nov. 7
1	Lipscomb (a.e.t.)	1
4	Florida Gulf Coast	0
2	Central Arkansas (pen.)	2 (3)
6	Bellarmine	2 (0)

Final; Saturday, Nov. 12
1	Lipscomb	6
2	Central Arkansas	2

== Schedule ==
=== First Round ===
November 5	#3 Stetson	2–2 (a.e.t.) (0–3 p)	#6 Bellarmine	Conway, AR
5:00 p.m. CT	Luis Lara Delgado (yellow card) 23', (goal) 65'; Kelvin Zinck (yellow card) 59'; Gio Rodriguez 88'	Report	44' Brock Pope; 75' Chris Shust; (yellow card) 82' Team; (yellow card) 98' Camden Dunne	Stadium: Bill Stephens Complex; Attendance: 52; Referee: Matthew Corrigan; Assistant referees: Matthew Rodman; Jason Rector; Fourth official: Jose Lara-Mancia
	Penalties
	Lewis Scattergood (penalty missed); Gio Rodriguez (penalty missed); Allessandro Gabbani (penalty missed)		(penalty scored) Nolan McGrath; (penalty scored) Brock Pope; (penalty missed) Cooper Forcellini; (penalty scored) Joey Gladys

November 5	#4 Florida Gulf Coast	4–0	#5 North Florida	Nashville, TN
7:00 p.m. CT	Markus Maurer 29'; Team (yellow card) 56'; Aedon Kyra 69'; Davi Alves 73'; Luke Peperak 88'	Report	(yellow card) 56' Rio Onwumere; (yellow card) 56' Dean Walker; (yellow card) 73' Luke Barforosh; (yellow card) 76' Joaquin Acuna; (red card) 79' Alex Barnett	Stadium: Lipscomb Soccer Complex; Referee: Daniel Radford; Assistant referees: Wes Williams; Gerson Otoniel Lopez Castellenos; Fourth official: Esteban Eordogh

=== Semifinals ===
November 7	#2 Central Arkansas	2–2 (a.e.t.) (3–0 p)	#6 Bellarmine	Conway, AR
6:00 p.m. CT	Daniel Shabani (yellow card) 32'; Sebastian Andreassen 55'; Team (red card) 55'; Kris Naicker 68'; Richy Lapointe-Guevara (yellow card) 74'	Report	25' Brock Pope; (yellow card) 40' Teagan Dunne; 74', (yellow card) 78' Cooper Forcellini; (yellow card) 89' Brendan Schoemehl	Stadium: Bill Stephens Complex; Attendance: 569; Referee: Velimir Stefanovic; Assistant referees: Andrew Ellsworth; Wes Caouette; Fourth official: Daniel Ortega
	Penalties
	Sebastian Andreassen (penalty scored); Pietro Fontana (penalty scored); Ignacio Bellina (penalty scored)		(penalty missed) Nolan McGrath; (penalty missed) Brock Pope; (penalty missed) Cooper Forcellini

November 7	#1 Lipscomb	1–0 (a.e.t.)	#4 Florida Gulf Coast	Nashville, TN
7:00 p.m. CT	Hayes Wood (yellow card) 46'; Louis Robinson (yellow card) 61'; Jelldrik Dallmann (yellow card) 76'; Luca Naumann 108'	Report	(yellow card) 5' Alon Drey; (yellow card) 38' Aedon Kyra; (yellow card) 48' Nadav Ohayon; (yellow card) 62' Jovoney Brown; (yellow card) 105' Anthony Rowan; (yellow card) 110' Pau Santanach; (red card) 110' Shandel Senior	Stadium: Lipscomb Soccer Complex; Attendance: 725; Referee: Sorin Stoica; Assistant referees: Christopher Heintzman; Alexander Garcia; Fourth official: Amin Hadzic

=== Final ===
November 12	#1 Lipscomb	6–2	#2 Central Arkansas	Nashville, TN
7:00 p.m. CT	Nick Dang (yellow card) 28', (goal) 74'; Tyrese Spicer 29'; Malachi Jones 31'; Javanne Smith 38'; Hayes Wood 65' (pen.); Alejandro Lopez 75'	Report	47' Mathias Bendiksen; (yellow card) 51' (yellow-red card) 90', (goal) 90' Karim Diao; (yellow card) 62' Sebastian Andreassen; (yellow card) 65' Sohma Ichikawa; (yellow card) 67' Rowan Laufer	Stadium: Lipscomb Soccer Complex; Attendance: 717; Referee: Matthew Corrigan; Assistant referees: Esteban Eordogh; Gerson Otoniel Lopez Catallenos; Fourth official: Amin Hadzic

== Statistics ==
=== Goalscorers ===
There were 21 goals scored in 5 matches, for an average of 4.2 goals per match (as of November 12, 2022).

2 goals

- Brock Pope – Bellarmine

1 goal

- Cooper Forcellini – Bellarmine
- Chris Shust – Bellarmine
- Sebastian Andreassen – Central Arkansas
- Mathias Bendiksen – Central Arkansas
- Karim Diao – Central Arkansas
- Kris Naicker – Central Arkansas
- Davi Alves – Florida Gulf Coast
- Aedon Kyra – Florida Gulf Coast
- Markus Maurer – Florida Gulf Coast
- Luke Peperak – Florida Gulf Coast
- Nick Dang – Lipscomb
- Malachi Jones – Lipscomb
- Alejandro Lopez – Lipscomb
- Luca Naumann – Lipscomb
- Javanne Smith – Lipscomb
- Tyrese Spicer – Lipscomb
- Hayes Wood – Lipscomb
- Luis Lara Delgado – Stetson
- Gio Rodriguez – Stetson

== All-Tournament team ==
Player	Team
**Hayes Wood**	Lipscomb
Nick Dang	Lipscomb
Malachi Jones	Lipscomb
Luca Naumann	Lipscomb
Michael Sibley	Lipscomb
Tyrese Spicer	Lipscomb
Sebastian Andreassen	Central Arkansas
Richy Lapointe-Guevara	Central Arkansas
Zach Schawl	Central Arkansas
Brock Pope	Bellarmine
Gio Rodriguez	Stetson

MVP in bold
