= 2022 Sun Belt Conference men's soccer tournament =

American college soccer postseason tournament

- Classification: Division I
- Teams: 8
- Matches: 7
- Site: Lexington, KY; Huntington, WV
- Champions: Kentucky (1st title)
- Winning coach: Johan Cedergren (1st title)
- MVP: Clay Holstad (Kentucky)
- Broadcast: ESPN+

2022 Sun Belt Conference men's soccer standings
	Conf.					Overall
Team	W		L		T	W		L		T
No. 6 Kentucky‡	5	–	0	–	3	15	–	1	–	5
No. 12 Marshall+	4	–	1	–	3	11	–	4	–	4
Georgia State	4	–	2	–	2	12	–	4	–	3
West Virginia	3	–	1	–	4	7	–	7	–	4
Coastal Carolina	2	–	1	–	5	5	–	5	–	6
Old Dominion	3	–	4	–	1	6	–	8	–	2
James Madison	2	–	3	–	3	8	–	8	–	4
South Carolina	1	–	4	–	3	5	–	8	–	4
Georgia Southern	0	–	8	–	0	1	–	14	–	1
‡ – 2022 Sun Belt Conference Tournament champion + – At-large invitation to the 2022 NCAA tournament; As of December 13, 2022; Rankings from United Soccer Coaches; Source: Sun Belt

The 2022 Sun Belt Conference men's soccer tournament was the 27th edition of the Sun Belt Conference Men's Soccer Tournament. The tournament ran from November 6 to November 13, 2022. Kentucky won the Sun Belt Conference (SBC) tournament and with it the SBC's automatic bid to the NCAA Division I National Tournament.

The conference announced the top two seeds would host the quarterfinals and semifinal rounds, and then the highest remaining seed in the finals would host the finals. #1 seed Kentucky and #2 seed Marshall earned the right to host the first two rounds of the tournament.

== Background ==
The Sun Belt shuttered its men's soccer league after all of its members moved the sport to other conferences by the end of the 2020–21 school year. The conference had lost one men's soccer team before the season when full conference member Appalachian State dropped men's soccer in May 2020, citing financial impacts from COVID-19. That July saw associate member Howard announce that it would become an associate member of the Northeast Conference in six sports, with men's soccer being one of four sports moving in July 2021. In January 2021 the ASUN Conference announced three schools as incoming full members, including Sun Belt men's soccer associate Central Arkansas. The following month saw full Sun Belt member Coastal Carolina announce that it would become a single-sport member of Conference USA, joining another in-state associate member in South Carolina. This left Georgia Southern and Georgia State, both full Sun Belt members, as the conference's only remaining men's soccer programs, and those two schools announced they would move that sport to the Mid-American Conference in late May 2021.

However, following a major conference realignment that brought three new men's soccer schools (James Madison, Marshall, and Old Dominion) to the conference, SBC commissioner Keith Gill announced on November 1, 2021, that men's soccer would be reinstated no later than 2023. With all three schools joining in 2022 instead of the originally intended 2023 timeline, the SBC announced on April 6, 2022, that men's soccer would instead return in 2022 with Kentucky, South Carolina, and West Virginia as affiliate members.

== Seeds ==
Seed	School	Conference	Points
1	Kentucky	5–0–3	18
2	Marshall	4–1–3	15
3	Georgia State	4–2–2	14
4	West Virginia	3–1–4	13
5	Coastal Carolina	2–1–5	11
6	Old Dominion	3–4–1	10
7	James Madison	2–3–3	9
8	South Carolina	1–4–3	6

== Bracket ==
Quarterfinals
1	Kentucky	2
8	South Carolina	1
4	Coastal Carolina	0
5	West Virginia	1
2	Marshall	0
7	James Madison	1
3	Georgia State	3
6	Old Dominion	1

Semifinals
Kentucky	3
West Virginia	0
Georgia State	0
James Madison	5

Finals
Kentucky	2
James Madison	0

== Schedule ==
=== Quarterfinals ===
November 6, 2022
3:00 PM EST

#4 West Virginia Mountaineers	1–0	#5 Coastal Carolina Chanticleers

Wendell & Vickie Bell Soccer Complex, Lexington, KY
Attendance: 576

November 6, 2022
3:00 PM EST

#2 Marshall Thundering Herd	0–1	#7 James Madison Dukes

Hoops Family Field, Huntington, WV
Attendance: 1402

November 6, 2022
7:00 PM EST

#1 Kentucky Wildcats	2–1	#8 South Carolina Gamecocks

Wendell & Vickie Bell Soccer Complex, Lexington, KY
Attendance: 1499

November 6, 2022
7:00 PM EST

#3 Georgia State Panthers	3–1	#6 Old Dominion Monarchs

Hoops Family Field, Huntington, WV
Attendance: 1402

=== Semifinals ===
November 9, 2022
8:00 PM EDT

#1 Kentucky	3–0	#4 West Virginia

Wendell & Vickie Bell Soccer Complex, Lexington, KY
Attendance: 1,677

November 9, 2022
8:00 PM EDT

#7 James Madison	5–0	#3 Georgia State

Hoops Family Field, Huntington, WV
Attendance: 389

=== Final ===
November 13, 2022
2:00 PM EDT

#1 Kentucky	2–0	#7 James Madison

Wendell & Vickie Bell Soccer Complex, Lexington, KY
Attendance: 2,389

== Statistics ==
=== Goalscorers ===
TBD

== Honors ==
=== All Tournament Team ===
TBA
