= Eliot Goldthorp =

English footballer (born 2001)

Personal information
- Date of birth: 3 November 2001 (age 25)
- Place of birth: Leeds, England
- Height: 6 ft 0 in (1.83 m)
- Position: Midfielder

Team information
- Current team: Pittsburgh Riverhounds
- Number: 37

Youth career
- 2009–2010: Manchester United
- 2010–2018: Leeds United
- 2018: Bradford City

College career
Years	Team	Apps	(Gls)
2021	Old Dominion Monarchs	13	(4)
2022–2023	Hofstra Pride	43	(25)

Senior career*
Years	Team	Apps	(Gls)
2018–2020	Bradford City	2	(0)
2019	→ Mossley (loan)	3	(0)
2019–2020	→ Radcliffe (loan)	2	(0)
2020	→ Matlock Town (loan)	1	(0)
2020–2021	Farsley Celtic		
2020–2021	→ Frickley Athletic (dual registration)		
2022	Des Moines Menace	12	(9)
2024	Whitecaps FC 2	22	(10)
2024	→ Vancouver Whitecaps FC (loan)	0	(0)
2025	Lexington SC	11	(1)
2025	→ FC Tulsa (loan)	16	(1)
2026–	Pittsburgh Riverhounds	27	(3)
- * Club domestic league appearances and goals as of 14:03, 8 November 2026 (UTC)

Eliot Goldthorp (born 3 November 2001) is an English professional footballer who plays as a midfielder for Pittsburgh Riverhounds in the USL Championship.

== Early life ==
Goldthorp was born in Leeds and played youth football for Manchester United, Leeds United and Bradford City.

== Club career ==
=== Early career ===
Goldthorp made his senior debut for Bradford City on 25 September 2018 in the EFL Trophy in a 1–1 draw against Everton U21s, scoring the winning penalty. On 9 October 2018, manager David Hopkin stated that Goldthorp would make his first senior start, also in the EFL Trophy. He was praised by Hopkin for his performance in the match, which was a 4–1 home defeat.

On 1 October 2019 he moved on loan to Mossley. He scored 3 goals in 5 games before being recalled by Bradford City later that month. His 5 games for Mossley included 3 in the league, 1 in the Manchester Premier Cup, and 1 in the FA Trophy Preliminary Round where he scored a hat-trick.

He moved on loan to Radcliffe in December 2019. On 8 January 2020 the loan deal was ended early. In February 2020 he moved on loan to Matlock Town until the end of the season.

Goldthorp was released by Bradford City at the end of the 2019–20 season.

He signed for Farsley Celtic in October 2020.

In December 2020, Goldthorp and teammate Joe West signed for Northern Premier League side Frickley Athletic on a dual registration deal.

=== North America ===
==== College career ====
In May 2021, Goldthorp signed to play collegiate soccer in the United States at Old Dominion University. In his freshman season, Goldthrop made 13 appearances, scoring four goals, and providing two assists, leading the team in total points. After his freshman season, he transferred to Hofstra University. During his first year at Hofstra he made 21 appearances, scoring 17 goals. He helped Hosftra qualify for the 2022 NCAA Division I men's soccer tournament. There, he scored twice for the Pride before they were eliminated in the first round.

During the 2022 college offseason, he played for the Des Moines Menace in USL League Two making 12 appearances, scoring nine goals and providing two assists.

==== Professional career ====
In December 2023, he was drafted by the Vancouver Whitecaps FC of Major League Soccer. In March 2024, he signed with the second team, Whitecaps FC 2, in MLS Next Pro. During the 2024 season, he twice signed short-term loans with the first team. In August 2024, he made his debut for the first team as a late substitute in a 3–1 victory over Tijuana in the Leagues Cup.

On 10 December 2024, Goldthorp joined Lexington SC ahead of their debut season in the USL Championship. On 6 June 2025, he joined FC Tulsa on loan for the remainder of the season.

In January 2026, he signed a one-year contract, with an option for 2027, with the Pittsburgh Riverhounds in the USL Championship.

== Personal life ==
His sister Francesca plays rugby league and rugby union.

== Career statistics ==
As of 12 May 2021

Appearances and goals by club, season and competition
Club	Season	League			Domestic cup		League cup		Other		Total	
Club	Season	Division	Apps	Goals	Apps	Goals	Apps	Goals	Apps	Goals	Apps	Goals
Bradford City	2018–19	League One	2	0	0	0	0	0	2 (Note: Appearances in the EFL Trophy.)	0	4	0
Bradford City	2019–20	League Two	0	0	0	0	0	0	0	0	0	0
Bradford City	Total		2	0	0	0	0	0	2	0	4	0
Mossley (loan)	2019–20	NPL Division One North West	3	0	0	0	0	0	2 (Note: One appearance in the Manchester Premier Cup, and one appearance and three goals in the FA Trophy Preliminary Round.)	3	5	3
Radcliffe (loan)	2019–20	NPL Premier Division	2	0	0	0	0	0	0	0	2	0
Matlock Town (loan)	2019–20	NPL Premier Division	1	0	0	0	0	0	2 (Note: One appearance in the Integro League Cup, and one appearance in the Derbyshire Senior Cup.)	0	3	0
Career total			8	0	0	0	0	0	6	3	14	3
