= 2020 Atlantic Coast Conference men's soccer season =

- League: NCAA Division I
- Sport: Soccer
- Duration: September 18, 2020 – November 8, 2020
- Teams: 11

2021 MLS SuperDraft
- Top draft pick: Daniel Pereira, 1st overall
- Picked by: Austin FC

Regular season
- Season champions: Pittsburgh (North Division); Wake Forest (South Division)
- Runners-up: Virginia Tech (North Division); North Carolina (South Division)
- Season MVP: Offensive: Valentin Noël; Midfielder: Daniel Pereira; Defensive:Jasper Löeffelsend

ACC Tournament
- Champions: Clemson
- Runners-up: Pittsburgh
- Finals MVP: (England) Kimarni Smith

ACC men's soccer seasons
- ← 2019 2021 →

2020 ACC men's fall soccer standings
	Conf.					Overall
Team	W		L		T	W		L		T
North
No. 2 Pittsburgh	4	–	0	–	0	7	–	1	–	0
No. 4 Virginia Tech	3	–	1	–	2	3	–	2	–	2
Notre Dame	3	–	2	–	0	5	–	4	–	0
Virginia	2	–	3	–	1	3	–	4	–	1
Louisville	1	–	4	–	1	1	–	6	–	1
Syracuse	0	–	3	–	2	0	–	3	–	2
South
No. 3 Wake Forest	5	–	1	–	0	7	–	2	–	0
North Carolina	3	–	1	–	2	3	–	2	–	2
No. 1 Clemson‡	3	–	2	–	1	8	–	2	–	1
Duke	2	–	4	–	0	2	–	6	–	0
NC State	0	–	5	–	1	0	–	6	–	1
Boston College†	0	–	0	–	0	0	–	0	–	0
‡ – 2020 ACC Tournament champion; As of March 9, 2021; Rankings from United Soccer Coaches; Source:The ACC; Note: † Due to COVID-19, Boston College suspended the Fall 2020 men's soccer season; begins play in March.

2020 ACC men's spring soccer standings
	Conf.					Overall
Team	W		L		T	W		L		T
Atlantic
No. 7 Clemson ‡	4	–	1	–	1	14	–	3	–	3
Louisville	4	–	2	–	0	5	–	8	–	1
No. 6 Wake Forest +	3	–	0	–	2	13	–	3	–	2
NC State	1	–	2	–	3	3	–	8	–	4
Boston College *	1	–	3	–	1	1	–	3	–	1
Syracuse	0	–	3	–	1	2	–	7	–	4
Coastal
No. 3 Pittsburgh +	5	–	1	–	0	16	–	4	–	0
No. 4 North Carolina +	4	–	1	–	1	9	–	5	–	4
Duke	2	–	3	–	1	3	–	10	–	3
Virginia	2	–	4	–	0	7	–	8	–	1
No. 15 Virginia Tech +	2	–	4	–	0	7	–	6	–	4
Notre Dame	1	–	5	–	0	8	–	9	–	0
‡ – 2020 ACC Fall Tournament champion + – Also invited to the 2020 NCAA Tournament; As of May 18, 2021; Rankings from United Soccer Coaches; Source:The ACC; Note: *- Due to COVID-19, Boston College suspended the Fall 2020 men's soccer season; began play in March.

The 2020 Atlantic Coast Conference men's soccer season will be the 67th season of men's varsity soccer in the conference.

Clemson are the defending champions of the Atlantic Conference and the Virginia are the defending champions of the Coastal Conference. Wake Forest are the defending ACC tournament Champions.

Due to the ongoing COVID-19 pandemic, the season has been significantly modified from previous seasons. The teams were reorganized geographically, and will play a six-game conference season. The season will begin on September 18, 2020, instead of August 28, 2020 and conclude on November 7, 2020. A modified spring season was also played due to the pandemic.

== Changes from 2019 ==
After 33 years as head coach, Ed Kelly retired following the 2019 season. Bob Thompson was hired as the head coach for Boston College on January 23, 2020.

=== Impact of the COVID-19 pandemic on the season ===
On September 4, 2020, the Atlantic Coast Conference announced the fall Olympic sports schedule, which included the schedule for men's soccer. The men's soccer season will begin on September 18, 2020, instead of the originally planned August 28, and conclude on November 8. The season will culminate with the 2020 ACC Men's Soccer tournament, which will be reduced to eight teams for the 2020 season only.

On January 26, 2021, it was announced that a spring portion of the 2020 season would be played. Each team will play five matches in their division. Divisions would return to the Atlantic and Coastal division, as in previous years. The winner of the Coastal will play the winner of the Atlantic on April 13. The winner of that match will play Clemson (winner of the fall season) on April 17 to determine the automatic qualifier for the NCAA tournament.

== Teams ==
=== Stadiums and locations ===
North Division
Team	Stadium	Capacity
Louisville Cardinals	Lynn Stadium	5,300
Notre Dame Fighting Irish	Alumni Stadium	2,500
Pittsburgh Panthers	Ambrose Urbanic Field	735
Syracuse Orange	SU Soccer Stadium	5,000
Virginia Cavaliers	Klöckner Stadium	8,000
Virginia Tech Hokies	Thompson Field	2,500

South Division
Team	Stadium	Capacity
Clemson Tigers	Riggs Field	6,500
Duke Blue Devils	Koskinen Stadium	7,000
North Carolina Tar Heels	Fetzer Field	5,025
Wake Forest Demon Deacons	Spry Stadium	3,000

1. Florida State, Georgia Tech and Miami do not sponsor men's soccer. Boston College has opted out of participating in the 2020 season due to the COVID-19 pandemic.

=== Personnel ===
Team	Head coach	Years at school	Overall record	Record at school	ACC record
Boston College	Bob Thompson	1	0–0–0	0–0–0	0–0–0
Clemson	Mike Noonan	10	323–176–43	110–63–30	41–29–13
Duke	John Kerr Jr.	13	188–138–40	107–79–27	40–44–15
Louisville	John Michael Hayden	2	10–8–2	10–8–2	3–4–1
North Carolina	Carlos Somoano	10	128–37–25	128–37–25	46–15–13
NC State	George Kiefer	4	113–34–26	131–47–33	8–11–5
Notre Dame	Chad Riley	3	21–15–4	21–15–4	7–8–2
Pittsburgh	Jay Vidovich	5	235–95–33	28–41–2	8–22–3
Syracuse	Ian McIntyre	11	200–132–58	93–68–28	18–27–13
Virginia	George Gelnovatch	25	341–129–59	341–129–59	89–59–31
Virginia Tech	Mike Brizendine	11	81–97–26	81–97–26	18–55–17
Wake Forest	Bobby Muuss	6	164–71–34	89–15–10	31–4–5

Notes

- Records shown are prior to the 2020 season
- Years at school includes the 2020 season
- ACC records include only years with current school.

== Preseason ==
=== Hermann Trophy ===
Due to the ongoing COVID-19 pandemic, a preseason Hermann Trophy watch list was released in January instead of August. Six players from ACC schools were named to the watchlist.

Player	Class	Position	School
Justin Malou	Senior	DF	Clemson
Valentin Noël	Sophomore	MF	Pittsburgh
Veljko Petkovic	Sophomore	MF	Pittsburgh
Colin Shutler	Senior	GK	Virginia
Kimarni Smith	Senior	FW	Clemson
Kristo Strickler	Senior	MF	Virginia Tech

=== Preseason Poll ===
The preseason poll was released on September 8, 2020.

South Division
Predicted finish	Team	Votes (1st place)
1	Clemson	45 (5)
2	Wake Forest	44 (5)
3	North Carolina	33 (1)
4	NC State	21
5	Duke	17

North Division
Predicted finish	Team	Votes (1st place)
1	Virginia	59 (9)
2	Pittsburgh	44 (2)
3	Virginia Tech	35
4	Syracuse	30
5	Louisville	29
6	Notre Dame	28

Media poll (ACC Championship)
Rank	Team	Votes
1	Clemson	5
2	Wake Forest	4
3	North Carolina	1
3	Virginia	1

=== Preseason national polls ===
The preseason national polls were to be released in August and September 2020. Only CollegeSoccerNews.com released a preseason poll due to the COVID-19 pandemic. TopDrawer Soccer and United Soccer Coaches released a preseason poll in February 2021.

	United; Soccer	CSN	Top Drawer; Soccer
Boston College	N/A	24	NR
Clemson	N/A	3	2
Duke	N/A	RV	NR
Louisville	N/A	18	NR
North Carolina	N/A	27	14
NC State	N/A	26	NR
Notre Dame	N/A	RV	12
Pitt	N/A	28	3
Syracuse	N/A	RV	NR
Virginia	N/A	7	NR
Virginia Tech	N/A	14	11
Wake Forest	N/A	4	5

=== Recruiting rankings ===
College Soccer News and TopDrawer Soccer release annual recruiting rankings. Below are their respective rankings for the Class of 2020 by program. Ten of the 12 programs earned Top 40 recruiting rankings by College Soccer News.

	CSN	Top Drawer; Soccer
Boston College	—	—
Clemson	9	11
Duke	1	2
Louisville	7	6
North Carolina	8	10
NC State	29	24
Notre Dame	32	—
Pitt	—	—
Syracuse	12	25
Virginia	5	3
Virginia Tech	23	20
Wake Forest	6	4

=== Preseason awards ===
Preseason All-ACC Watchlist

- Kimarni Smith, Senior, Forward, Clemson
- Jack Doran, Graduate, Midfielder, Duke
- Pedro Fonseca, Junior, Forward, Louisville
- Alec Smir, Junior, Goalkeeper, North Carolina
- George Asomani, Senior, Midfielder, NC State
- Jack Lynn, Junior, Forward, Notre Dame
- Edward Kizza, Senior, Forward, Pitt
- Sondre Norheim, Senior, Defender, Syracuse
- Nathaniel Crofts, Senior, Forward, Virginia
- Kristo Strickler, Senior, Forward, Virginia Tech
- Michael DeShields, Senior, Defender, Wake Forest

== Fall 2020 regular season ==
Index to colors and formatting
ACC member won
ACC member lost
ACC member tied
ACC teams in **bold**

All times Eastern time.

=== Week 1 (Sep. 14 – Sept. 20) ===
Date	Time (ET)	Visiting team	Home team	Site	Result	Attendance
September 17	7:00 p.m.	Kentucky	No. 5 **Notre Dame**	Alumni Stadium • Notre Dame, IN	**W** 1–0	1

Players of the Week

Offensive		Defensive	
Player	Team	Player	Team
Daniel Russo	Notre Dame	Keagan McLaughlin	Notre Dame

=== Week 2 (Sep. 21 – Sept. 27) ===
Date	Time (ET)	Visiting team	Home team	Site	Result	Attendance
September 21	7:00 p.m.	**Duke**	Kentucky	Bell Soccer Complex • Lexington, KY	**L** 2–4	95
September 25	7:30 p.m.	No. 1 **Wake Forest**	**Louisville**	Lynn Stadium • Louisville, KY	**WAKE** 3–1	112
September 26	7:00 p.m.	**NC State**	**Duke**	Koskinen Stadium • Durham, NC	**DUKE** 1–0 (2OT)	0
September 26	7:00 p.m.	No. 4 **Pittsburgh**	No. 5 **Notre Dame**	Alumni Stadium • South Bend, IN	**PITT** 3–1	0

Players of the Week

Offensive		Defensive	
Player	Team	Player	Team
Bertin Jacquesson	Pittsburgh	Arturo Ordoñez	Pittsburgh
Calvin Harris	Wake Forest	Arturo Ordoñez	Pittsburgh

=== Week 3 (Sep. 28 – Oct. 4) ===
Date	Time (ET)	Visiting team	Home team	Site	Result	Attendance
September 28	7:30 p.m.	**Louisville**	Kentucky	Bell Soccer Complex • Lexington, KY	**L** 1–3	115
October 1	7:00 p.m.	No. 3 **Clemson**	South Carolina	Stone Stadium • Columbia, SC	**W** 3–0	460
October 2	7:00 p.m.	**North Carolina**	**Duke**	Koskinen Stadium • Durham, NC	**UNC** 2–0	0
October 3	7:00 p.m.	**Notre Dame**	**Louisville**	Lynn Stadium • Louisville, KY	**LOU** 2–1	169
October 3	7:00 p.m.	**NC State**	No. 1 **Wake Forest**	Spry Stadium • Winston-Salem, NC	**WAKE** 4–1	0

Players of the Week

Offensive		Defensive	
Player	Team	Player	Team
Kyle Holcomb	Wake Forest	Alec Smir	North Carolina
Mohamed Seye	Clemson	Alec Smir	North Carolina

=== Week 4 (Oct. 5 – Oct. 11) ===
Date	Time (ET)	Visiting team	Home team	Site	Result	Attendance
October 5	6:00 p.m.	UAB	No. 3 Clemson	Riggs Field • Clemson, SC	**W** 2–0	748
October 6	7:00 p.m.	**No. 2 Pittsburgh**	Syracuse	SU Soccer Stadium • Syracuse, NY	**PITT** 3–2 (2OT)	1
October 9	6:00 p.m.	**No. 3 Clemson**	North Carolina	Dorrance Field • Chapel Hill, NC	**UNC** 1–0	0
October 9	7:00 p.m.	**Louisville**	No. 5 Virginia	Klöckner Stadium • Charlottesville, VA	**UVA** 2–1 (2OT)	177
October 9	8:00 p.m.	**Duke**	NC State	Dail Field • Raleigh, NC	**DUKE** 3–1	70
October 10	7:00 p.m.	UAB	No. 1 Wake Forest	Spry Stadium • Winston-Salem, NC	**W** 3–0	0
October 10	7:00 p.m.	**Virginia Tech**	No. 2 Pittsburgh	Ambrose Urbanic Field • Pittsburgh, PA	**PITT** 4–2	55
October 11	7:00 p.m.	**Syracuse**	Notre Dame	Alumni Stadium • South Bend, IN	**ND** 1–0	0

Players of the Week

Offensive		Defensive	
Player	Team	Player	Team
Veljko Petkovic	Pittsburgh	Colin Shutler	Virginia
Veljko Petkovic	Pittsburgh	Fillipo Zattarin	North Carolina

=== Week 5 (Oct. 12 – Oct. 18) ===
Date	Time (ET)	Visiting team	Home team	Site	Result	Attendance
October 13	7:00 p.m.	**No. 1 Wake Forest**	Clemson	Riggs Field • Clemson, SC	**CLEM** 2–1	1,000
October 14	8:00 p.m.	**No. 5 Virginia**	Virginia Tech	Thompson Field • Blacksburg, VA	**T** 1–1 (2OT)	130
October 16	8:00 p.m.	**Duke**	Clemson	Riggs Field • Clemson, SC	**CLEM** 2–1 (2OT)	1,000
October 16	8:00 p.m.	**Louisville**	Syracuse	SU Soccer Stadium • Syracuse, NY	**T** 2–2 (2OT)	1
October 17	11:00 p.m.	**Notre Dame**	Virginia Tech	Thompson Field • Blacksburg, VA	**PPD**	
October 17	6:00 p.m.	**No. 3 North Carolina**	No. 1 Wake Forest	Spry Stadium • Winston-Salem, NC	**WAKE** 1–0 (OT)	0
October 17	7:00 p.m.	Navy	NC State	Dail Soccer Field • Raleigh, NC	**L** 1–2	70
October 17	7:00 p.m.	**No. 2 Pittsburgh**	No. 5 Virginia	Klöckner Stadium • Charlottesville, VA	**PITT** 3–2 (OT)	132

Players of the Week

Offensive		Defensive	
Player	Team	Player	Team
Valentin Noël	Pittsburgh	George Marks	Clemson
Kimarni Smith	Clemson	George Marks	Clemson

=== Week 6 (Oct. 19 – Oct. 25) ===
Date	Time (ET)	Visiting team	Home team	Site	Result	Attendance
October 23	6:00 p.m.	**No. 2 Wake Forest**	**Duke**	Koskinen Stadium • Durham, NC	**WF** 2–1	0
October 23	7:00 p.m.	**No. 1 Pittsburgh**	**Louisville**	Lynn Stadium • Louisville, KY	**PITT** 4–1	0
October 23	8:00 p.m.	**No. 3 Clemson**	**NC State**	Dail Field • Raleigh, NC	**CLEM** 1–0	88
October 24	1:00 p.m.	**Virginia**	**Notre Dame**	Alumni Field • South Bend, IN	**ND** 2–1 (2OT)	133
October 24	6:30 p.m.	**Syracuse**	**Virginia Tech**	Thompson Field • Blacksburg, VA	**T** 1–1 (2OT)	101

Players of the Week

Offensive		Defensive	
Player	Team	Player	Team
Omar Hernandez	Wake Forest	Oskar Ågren	Clemson
Grayson Barber	Clemson	Oskar Ågren	Clemson

=== Week 7 (Oct. 26 – Nov. 1) ===
Date	Time (ET)	Visiting team	Home team	Site	Result	Attendance
October 27	7:00 p.m.	**No. 5 North Carolina**	**No. 3 Clemson**	Riggs Field • Clemson, SC	**T** 3–3 (2OT)	1,000
October 30	5:00 p.m.	**No. 3 Clemson**	**No. 2 Wake Forest**	Spry Stadium • Winston-Salem, NC	**WAKE** 2–0	0
October 30	8:00 p.m.	**Virginia Tech**	**Louisville**	Lynn Stadium • Louisville, KY	**VT** 2–1 (OT)	212
October 30	8:00 p.m.	**Virginia**	**Syracuse**	SU Soccer Stadium • Syracuse, NY	**UVA** 1–0	160
November 1	1:00 p.m.	**NC State**	**No. 5 North Carolina**	Dorrance Field • Chapel Hill, NC	**T** 0–0 (2OT)	0

Players of the Week

Offensive		Defensive	
Player	Team	Player	Team
Jacob Labovitz	Virginia Tech	Nico Benalcazar	Wake Forest

=== Week 8 (Nov. 2 – Nov. 8) ===
Date	Time (ET)	Visiting team	Home team	Site	Result	Attendance
November 2	1:00 p.m.	**Virginia Tech**	**Notre Dame**	Alumni Field • South Bend, IN	**VT** 1–0	0
November 6	4:00 p.m.	**Virginia Tech**	**Virginia**	Klöckner Stadium • Charlottesville, VA	**VT** 1–0	265
November 6	7:00 p.m.	**Louisville**	**Notre Dame**	Alumni Field • South Bend, IN	**ND** 4–1	266
November 6	8:00 p.m.	**Duke**	No. 4 **North Carolina**	Dorrance Field • Chapel Hill, NC	**UNC** 2–0	0
November 7	7:00 p.m.	No. 2 **Wake Forest**	**NC State**	Dail Field • Raleigh, NC	**WAKE** 2–0	77

Players of the Week

Offensive		Defensive	
Player	Team	Player	Team
Jack Lynn	Notre Dame	Andrew Pannenberg	Wake Forest

== Spring 2021 regular season ==
Index to colors and formatting
ACC member won
ACC member lost
ACC member tied
ACC teams in **bold**

All times Eastern time.

=== Week 11 (Feb. 3 – Feb. 7) ===
Date	Time (ET)	Visiting team	Home team	Site	Result	Attendance
No games scheduled

=== Week 12 (Feb. 8 – Feb. 14) ===
Date	Time (ET)	Visiting team	Home team	Site	Result	Attendance
February 12	1:30 p.m.	Hofstra	**Syracuse**	Afrim's Sports Park • Albany, NY	**W** 2–1	0
February 12	7:00 p.m.	Charlotte	**Duke**	Koskinen Stadium • Durham, NC	**T** 0–0 (2OT)	0

=== Week 13 (Feb. 15 – Feb. 21) ===
Date	Time (ET)	Visiting team	Home team	Site	Result	Attendance
February 19	1:30 p.m.	**Syracuse**	Albany	Afrim's Sports Park • Albany, NY	**T** 1–1 (2OT)	0
February 19	7:00 p.m.	Kentucky	**Duke**	Koskinen Stadium • Durham, NC	**L** 0–1 (OT)	0
February 20	7:00 p.m.	UAB	**NC State**	Dail Soccer Field • Raleigh, NC	**W** 2–0	100
February 21	3:00 p.m.	Akron	**Pittsburgh**	Ambrose Urbanic Field • Pittsburgh, PA	Postponed	–

=== Week 14 (Feb. 22 – Feb. 28) ===
Date	Time (ET)	Visiting team	Home team	Site	Result	Attendance
February 23	12:30 p.m.	Bowling Green	**Syracuse**	SU Soccer Stadium • Buffalo, NY	**L** 1–2	0
February 24	6:00 p.m.	**NC State**	VCU	Sports Backers Stadium • Richmond, VA	**W** 1–0	103
February 25	6:00 p.m.	Liberty	**North Carolina**	Dorrance Field • Chapel Hill, NC	**L** 0–1	0
February 26	7:00 p.m.	UNCW	**Duke**	Koskinen Stadium • Durham, NC	**T** 0–0 (2OT)	0
February 27	2:00 p.m.	**Notre Dame**	Butler	Sellick Bowl • Indianapolis, IN	**W** 1–0	100
February 27	7:00 p.m.	Duquesne	**Pittsburgh**	Ambrose Urbanic Field • Pittsburgh, PA	**W** 1–0	0
February 28	1:00 p.m.	**Virginia Tech**	Coastal Carolina	CCU Soccer Field • Conway, SC	**W** 2–0	200

=== Week 15 (Mar. 1 – Mar. 7) ===
Date	Time (ET)	Visiting team	Home team	Site	Result	Attendance
March 1	6:00 p.m.	Davidson	Wake Forest	Spry Stadium • Winston-Salem, NC	**W** 1–0	0
March 2	1:00 p.m.	George Mason	Virginia	Klöckner Stadium • Charlottesville, VA	**W** 3–0	0
March 4	6:00 p.m.	**Louisville**	NC State	Dail Soccer Field • Raleigh, NC	**LOU** 3–0	90
March 5	7:00 p.m.	**No. 4 Pittsburgh**	North Carolina	Dorrance Field • Chapel Hill, NC	**UNC** 3–0	351
March 6	1:00 p.m.	**Duke**	No. 13 Virginia Tech	Thompson Field • Blacksburg, VA	**DUKE** 4–2	250
March 6	7:00 p.m.	**Boston College**	No. 6 Wake Forest	Spry Stadium • Winston-Salem, NC	**WAKE** 3–2	0
March 7	1:00 p.m.	**Notre Dame**	Virginia	Klöckner Stadium • Charlottesville, VA	**UVA** 1–0 (OT)	110
March 7	5:00 p.m.	**Syracuse**	No. 1 Clemson	Riggs Field • Clemson, SC	**CLEM** 3–1	813

Players of the Week

Offensive		Defensive	
Player	Team	Player	Team
Giovanni Montesdeoca	North Carolina	Oliver Gerbig	Virginia

=== Week 16 (Mar. 8 – Mar. 14) ===
Date	Time (ET)	Visiting team	Home team	Site	Result	Attendance
March 12	7:00 p.m.	Notre Dame	Duke	Koskinen Stadium • Durham, NC	**ND** 2–0	0
March 12	7:00 p.m.	Syracuse	Louisville	Lynn Stadium • Louisville, KY	**LOU** 3–1	300
March 13	5:00 p.m.	No. 1 Clemson	No. 21 Virginia Tech	Thompson Field • Blacksburg, VA	**CLEM** 1–0 (2OT)	250
March 13	6:00 p.m.	NC State	No. 4 Wake Forest	Spry Stadium • Winston-Salem, NC	**T** 0–0 (2OT)	350
March 13	7:00 p.m.	Boston College	No. 8 Pittsburgh	Ambrose Urbanic Field • Pittsburgh, PA	**PITT** 2–0	0
March 13	7:00 p.m.	No. 24 Virginia	North Carolina	Dorrance Field • Chapel Hill, NC	**UNC** 2–0	580

Players of the Week

Offensive		Defensive	
Player	Team	Player	Team
Giovanni Montesdeoca	North Carolina	Philip Quinton	Notre Dame
Jack Lynn	Notre Dame	Philip Quinton	Notre Dame

=== Week 17 (Mar. 15 – Mar. 21) ===
Date	Time (ET)	Visiting team	Home team	Site	Result	Attendance
March 16	7:00 p.m.	Calvin	Notre Dame	Alumni Stadium • South Bend, IN	**W** 1–0	141
March 19	2:00 p.m.	**Virginia Tech**	Virginia	Klöckner Stadium • Charlottesville, VA	**UVA** 2–0	187
March 19	7:00 p.m.	**No. 7 Pittsburgh**	Duke	Koskinen Stadium • Durham, NC	**PITT** 4–3 (2OT)	0
March 20	2:00 p.m.	**Louisville**	Boston College	Newton Soccer Complex • Chestnut Hill, MA	**BC** 4–0	0
March 20	2:00 p.m.	**No. 15 North Carolina**	Syracuse	SU Soccer Stadium • Syracuse, NY	**T** 0–0 (2OT)	0
March 20	7:00 p.m.	**NC State**	No. 1 Clemson	Riggs Field • Clemson, SC	**CLEM** 1–0	753
March 20	7:00 p.m.	**No. 5 Wake Forest**	Notre Dame	Alumni Stadium • South Bend, IN	**WAKE** 3–2	241

Offensive		Defensive	
Player	Team	Player	Team
Valentin Noël	Pittsburgh	Mike Suski	Boston College
Christian Garner	Boston College	Alex Rando	Virginia

=== Week 18 (Mar. 22 – Mar. 28) ===
Date	Time (ET)	Visiting team	Home team	Site	Result	Attendance
March 23	5:00 p.m.	Central Arkansas	Virginia	Klöckner Stadium • Charlottesville, VA	**W** 1–0	301
March 26	7:00 p.m.	**Syracuse**	NC State	Dail Soccer Field • Raleigh, NC	**NCST** 2–1 (OT)	100
March 27	1:00 p.m.	**No. 1 Clemson**	Boston College	Newton Soccer Complex • Chestnut Hill, MA	**CLEM** 3–2	35
March 27	1:00 p.m.	**No. 5 Pittsburgh**	Virginia Tech	Thompson Field • Blacksburg, VA	**PITT** 2–1 (2OT)	600
March 27	7:00 p.m.	**Louisville**	No. 6 Wake Forest	Spry Stadium • Winston-Salem, NC	**WAKE** 2–1 (OT)	450
March 27	7:00 p.m.	**No. 16 North Carolina**	Notre Dame	Alumni Stadium • South Bend, IN	**UNC** 2–1 (OT)	143
March 28	1:00 p.m.	**Duke**	Virginia	Klöckner Stadium • Charlottesville, VA	**DUKE** 3–1	441

Players of the Week

Offensive		Defensive	
Player	Team	Player	Team
Thor Ulfarsson	Duke	Jackson Walti	Pittsburgh

=== Week 19 (Mar. 29 – Apr. 4) ===
Date	Time (ET)	Visiting team	Home team	Site	Result	Attendance
March 30	6:00 p.m.	St. Francis	Syracuse	SU Soccer Stadium • Syracuse, NY	**W** 1–0	0
April 2	7:00 p.m.	**Virginia**	Louisville	Lynn Stadium • Louisville, KY	**LOU** 2–1	370
April 2	7:00 p.m.	**Virginia Tech**	No. 15 North Carolina	Dorrance Field • Chapel Hill, NC	**VT** 1–0	423
April 2	7:00 p.m.	**No. 4 Wake Forest**	No. 1 Clemson	Riggs Field • Clemson, SC	**T** 0–0 (2OT)	1,000
April 3	7:00 p.m.	**Duke**	NC State	Dail Soccer Stadium • Raleigh, NC	**T** 0–0 (2OT)	100
April 3	7:00 p.m.	**Notre Dame**	No. 3 Pittsburgh	Ambrose Urbanic Field • Pittsburgh, PA	**PITT** 2–0	0

Offensive		Defensive	
Player	Team	Player	Team
Kristo Strickler	Virginia Tech	Nathan Durst	Virginia Tech

=== Week 20 (Apr. 5 – Apr. 11) ===
Date	Time (ET)	Visiting team	Home team	Site	Result	Attendance
April 8	7:00 p.m.	Virginia	No. 1 Pittsburgh	Ambrose Urbanic Field • Pittsburgh, PA	**PITT** 5–0	0
April 9	7:00 p.m.	NC State	Boston College	Newton Soccer Complex • Chestnut Hill, MA	**T** 0–0 (2OT)	65
April 9	7:00 p.m.	No. 3 Clemson	Louisville	Lynn Stadium • Louisville, KY	**LOU** 2–1	0
April 9	7:00 p.m.	Virginia Tech	Notre Dame	Alumni Stadium • South Bend, IN	**VT** 2–0	203
April 9	7:00 p.m.	No. 4 Wake Forest	Syracuse	SU Soccer Stadium • Syracuse, NY	Canceled	
April 11	7:00 p.m.	No. 18 North Carolina	Duke	Koskinen Stadium • Durham, NC	**UNC** 1–0	0

Offensive		Defensive	
Player	Team	Player	Team
Aboubacar Camara	Louisville	Detre Bell	Louisville

== Rankings ==
=== Fall 2020 ===
==== National ====
===== United Soccer Coaches =====
Legend
Increase in ranking
Decrease in ranking
Not ranked previous week

	Wk 1	Wk 2	Wk 3	Wk 4	Wk 5	Wk 6	Wk 7	Wk 8	Wk 9	Final
Boston College										
Clemson	2	3	3		3	3	5	4	2	1
Duke										
Louisville										
North Carolina				3	5	5	4	3	4	
NC State										
Notre Dame	5									
Pittsburgh	4	2	2	2	1	1	1	1	1	2
Syracuse										
Virginia	3	5	5	5						
Virginia Tech								5		4
Wake Forest	1	1	1	1	2	2	2	2	3	3

=== Spring 2021 ===
==== National ====
Legend
Increase in ranking
Decrease in ranking
Not ranked previous week

===== United Soccer Coaches =====
	Wk 1	Wk 2	Wk 3	Wk 4	Wk 5	Wk 6	Wk 7	Wk 8	Final
Boston College									
Clemson	1 (16)	1 (23)	1 (19)	1 (24)	1 (23)	3 (4)	4 (1)	1 (21)	7
Duke		RV							
Louisville									
North Carolina		RV	15	16	15	18	15	16	4
NC State									
Notre Dame	RV	RV	RV						
Pittsburgh	4	8	7	5	3 (1)	1 (13)	1 (16)	3 (1)	3 (2)
Syracuse									
Virginia		24	RV	RV					
Virginia Tech	13	21					25	RV	15
Wake Forest	6	4	5	6	4 (1)	4	5	4 (2)	6

===== Top Drawer Soccer =====
Legend
Increase in ranking
Decrease in ranking
Not ranked previous week

	Pre	Wk 1	Wk 2	Wk 3	Wk 4	Wk 5	Wk 6	Wk 7	Wk 8	Wk 9	Wk 10	Wk 11	Wk 12	Wk 13	Final
Boston College															
Clemson	2	2	2	2	2	1	1	1	1	1	5	1	1	9	9
Duke															
Louisville															
North Carolina	14	13	13	14					RV				16	8	4
NC State															
Notre Dame	12	11	11	11	11	RV	RV								
Pittsburgh	3	3	3	3	3	7	6	5	4	4	3	6	5	1	3
Syracuse															
Virginia															
Virginia Tech	11	10	10	10	10	17	18						15	16	16
Wake Forest	5	5	5	5	5	4	5	4	3	3	2	2	2	2	5

== Postseason ==
=== ACC Tournament ===
Eight teams will qualify for the modified ACC Men's Soccer Tournament.

Semifinals
N1	Pittsburgh	3
N3	Notre Dame	1
N4	Virginia	1
S3	Clemson	2

Final
N1	Pittsburgh	1
S3	Clemson	2

=== NCAA tournament ===
On August 13, 2020, the NCAA suspended postseason tournaments for all fall sports. The tournament will be played from April 17 to May 17, 2021.

Seed	School	2nd Round	3rd Round	Quarterfinals	Semifinals	Championship
1	Clemson	W 2–1 vs. American – (Spry Stadium)	T 1–1 (6–7 PKs) vs. Marshall – (WakeMed Soccer Park)			
2	Pittsburgh	W 6–1 vs. Monmouth – (Bryan Park)	W 4–0 vs. UCF – (WakeMed Soccer Park)	W 3–0 vs. #7 Washington – (WakeMed Soccer Park)	L 0–1 vs. #3 Indiana – (WakeMed Soccer Park)	
5	Wake Forest	W 3–2 vs. Coastal Carolina – (Spry Stadium)	W 2–1 vs. Kentucky – (WakeMed Soccer Park)	L 1–2 vs. North Carolina – (WakeMed Soccer Park)		
	North Carolina	T 1–1 (4–1 PKs) vs. Charlotte – (Sahlen's Stadium)	W 1–0 vs. #4 Stanford – (WakeMed Soccer Park)	W 2–1 vs. #5 Wake Forest – (WakeMed Soccer Park)	L 0–1 vs. Marshall – (WakeMed Soccer Park)	
	Virginia Tech	W 2–1 (OT) vs. Oregon State – (Bryan Park)	T 2–2 (6–7 PKs) vs. #6 Seton Hall – (WakeMed Soccer Park)			
	W–L (%):	4–0–1 (.900)	3–0–2 (.800)	2–1–0 (.667)	0–2–0 (.000)	0–0–0 (–) Total: 9–3–3 (.700)

== Awards ==
=== Postseason awards ===
The Atlantic Coast Conference post season awards were announced on April 14, 2021, and considered both the fall season and spring season. Some players who were drafted and did not play in the spring season were included on the All Conference teams.

==== All-ACC awards and teams ====
2020 ACC Men's Soccer Individual Awards
Award	Recipient(s)
Coach of the Year	Jay Vidovich – Pittsburgh
Offensive Player of the Year	Valentin Noël – Pittsburgh
Midfielder of the Year	Daniel Pereira – Virginia Tech
Defensive Player of the Year	Jasper Löeffelsend – Pittsburgh
Freshman of the Year	Bertin Jacquesson – Pittsburgh

2020 ACC Men's Soccer All-Conference Teams
First Team	Second Team	Third Team	Rookie Team
Grayson Barber, Jr., F, Clemson; Philip Mayaka, So., M, Clemson; Kimarni Smith, Sr., F, Clemson; Jack Lynn, Jr., F, Notre Dame; Nico Campuzano, Gr., GK, Pittsburgh; Jasper Löeffelsend, Gr., D, Pittsburgh; Valentin Noël, So., M, Pittsburgh; Daniel Pereira, So., M, Virginia Tech; Kristo Strickler, Sr., M, Virginia Tech; Calvin Harris, So., F, Wake Forest; Isaiah Parente, Jr., M, Wake Forest	Oskar Ågren, So., D, Clemson; Pedro Fonseca, Jr., F, Louisville; Giovanni Montesdeoca, Sr., F, North Carolina; Alec Smir, Jr., GK, North Carolina; Aiden McFadden, Sr., M, Notre Dame; Bertin Jacquesson, Fr., F, Pittsburgh; Veljko Petković, So., M, Pittsburgh; Jackson Walti, Jr., M, Pittsburgh; Bret Halsey, Jr., M, Virginia; Nico Benalcazar, So., D, Wake Forest; Machop Chol, Sr., F, Wake Forest	Kristofer Konradsson, Jr., M, Boston College; Luis Felipe Fernandez-Salvador, Jr., M, Clemson; Justin Malou, Sr., D, Clemson; George Marks, Jr., GK, Clemson; Peter Stroud, Fr., M, Duke; Elijah Amo, Sr., M, Louisville; Alexander Dexter, Sr., F, Pittsburgh; Arturo Ordoñez, So., D, Pittsburgh; Andreas Ueland, So., D, Virginia; Jacob Labovitz, Sr., F, Virginia Tech; Kyle Holcomb, Jr., F, Wake Forest	Hamady Diop, D, Clemson; Ousmane Sylla, M, Clemson; Antino Lopez, M, Duke; Nick Pariano, M, Duke; Peter Stroud, M, Duke; Thorleifur Úlfarsson, F, Duke; Aboubacar Camara, F, Louisville; Bertin Jacquesson, F, Pittsburgh; Filip Mirkovic, M, Pittsburgh; Deandre Kerr, F, Syracuse; Garrison Tubbs, D, Wake Forest

== MLS SuperDraft ==
The 2021 MLS SuperDraft was held on January 21, 2021. The Atlantic Coast Conference had a record total of twenty five players selected, with twelve first round selections. This eclipsed the previous record of eighteen total selections, set twice previously. The twelve first round picks surpassed the previous record of eight first round picks, set in 2016, 2018, and 2020. The twenty five players selected represented one third of the players taken in the draft. The ACC also had five players selected in the first five picks, a first in draft history. Also of note, at least one player was selected from a team that played during the 2020 season. Only Boston College did not have a player selected and Boston College elected to suspend their season due to COVID-19.

=== Total picks by school ===
Team	Round 1	Round 2	Round 3	Total
Clemson	3	–	–	3
Duke	1	–	–	1
Louisville	–	2	–	2
NC State	–	1	–	1
North Carolina	–	1	2	3
Notre Dame	–	–	1	1
Pittsburgh	1	–	–	1
Syracuse	1	–	1	2
Virginia	2	3	–	5
Virginia Tech	1	1	–	2
Wake Forest	3	1	–	4
Total	12	9	4	25

=== List of selections ===
Round	Pick #	MLS team	Player	Position	College
1	1	Austin FC	(Venezuela) Daniel Pereira	MF	Virginia Tech
1	2	FC Cincinnati	(England) (Hong Kong) Calvin Harris	FW	Wake Forest
1	3	Colorado Rapids	(Kenya) Philip Mayaka	MF	Clemson
1	4	D.C. United	(England) Kimarni Smith	FW	Clemson
1	5	D.C. United	(United States) Michael DeShields	DF	Wake Forest
1	7	Real Salt Lake	(United States) Bret Halsey	DF	Virginia
1	13	New York Red Bulls	(Guadeloupe) Luther Archimède	FW	Syracuse
1	17	Minnesota United FC	(Jamaica) Justin McMaster	FW	Wake Forest
1	20	Nashville SC	(Tanzania) Irakoze Donasiyano	FW	Virginia
1	21	Austin FC	(United States) Aedan Stanley	DF	Duke
1	24	New England Revolution	(Uganda) Edward Kizza	FW	Pittsburgh
1	27	Columbus Crew	(Senegal) Justin Malou	DF	Clemson
2	28	Austin FC	(Scotland) Daniel Steedman	FW	Virginia
2	30	Houston Dynamo	(United States) Kristofer Strickler	FW	Virginia Tech
2	34	Real Salt Lake	(United States) Elijah Amo	FW	Louisville
2	39	San Jose Earthquakes	(Ghana) George Asomani	MF	NC State
2	40	New York Red Bulls	(Guinea) Lamine Conte	MF	Louisville
2	45	Toronto FC	(England) Nathaniel Crofts	FW	Virginia
2	48	FC Dallas	(United States) Colin Shutler	GK	Virginia
2	49	Orlando City SC	(United States) Andrew Pannenberg	GK	Wake Forest
2	50	Sporting Kansas City	(Canada) Matt Constant	DF	North Carolina
3	59	Atlanta United	(United States) Aiden McFadden	MF	Notre Dame
3	73	Nashville SC	(Norway) Sondre Norheim	DF	Syracuse
3	76	FC Dallas	(United States) Mark Salas	DF	North Carolina
3	79	FC Dallas	(United States) Giovanni Montesdeoca	FW	North Carolina

== Homegrown players ==
The Homegrown Player Rule is a Major League Soccer program that allows MLS teams to sign local players from their own development academies directly to MLS first team rosters. Before the creation of the rule in 2008, every player entering Major League Soccer had to be assigned through one of the existing MLS player allocation processes, such as the MLS SuperDraft.

To place a player on its homegrown player list, making him eligible to sign as a homegrown player, players must have resided in that club's home territory and participated in the club's youth development system for at least one year. Players can play college soccer and still be eligible to sign a homegrown contract.

Original MLS team	Player	Pos.	School	Ref.
Atlanta United	Machop Chol	MF	Wake Forest (Sr.)	
Columbus Crew	Isaiah Parente	MF	Wake Forest (Jr.)	
Sporting Kansas City	Grayson Barber	F	Clemson (Jr.)	
