= 2020 ACC men's soccer tournament =

Soccer tournament

- Classification: Division I
- Teams: 8
- Matches: 7
- Attendance: 677
- Site: Sahlen's Stadium; Cary, North Carolina
- Champions: Clemson (4th title)
- Winning coach: Mike Noonan (2nd title)
- MVP: Kimarni Smith (Clemson)
- Broadcast: ESPNU (Final), ACC Network Extra (all other rounds)

2020 ACC men's fall soccer standings
| | Conf. | | | | | Overall |
| Team | W | | L | | T | W | | L | | T |
|---|---|---|---|---|---|---|---|---|---|---|
North
| No. 2 Pittsburgh | 4 | – | 0 | – | 0 | 7 | – | 1 | – | 0 |
| No. 4 Virginia Tech | 3 | – | 1 | – | 2 | 3 | – | 2 | – | 2 |
| Notre Dame | 3 | – | 2 | – | 0 | 5 | – | 4 | – | 0 |
| Virginia | 2 | – | 3 | – | 1 | 3 | – | 4 | – | 1 |
| Louisville | 1 | – | 4 | – | 1 | 1 | – | 6 | – | 1 |
| Syracuse | 0 | – | 3 | – | 2 | 0 | – | 3 | – | 2 |
South
| No. 3 Wake Forest | 5 | – | 1 | – | 0 | 7 | – | 2 | – | 0 |
| North Carolina | 3 | – | 1 | – | 2 | 3 | – | 2 | – | 2 |
| No. 1 Clemson‡ | 3 | – | 2 | – | 1 | 8 | – | 2 | – | 1 |
| Duke | 2 | – | 4 | – | 0 | 2 | – | 6 | – | 0 |
| NC State | 0 | – | 5 | – | 1 | 0 | – | 6 | – | 1 |
| Boston College† | 0 | – | 0 | – | 0 | 0 | – | 0 | – | 0 |
‡ – 2020 ACC Tournament champion; As of March 9, 2021; Rankings from United Soccer Coaches; Source:The ACC; Note: † Due to COVID-19, Boston College suspended the Fall 2020 men's soccer season; begins play in March.

The 2020 ACC men's soccer tournament was the 34th edition of the ACC Men's Soccer Tournament. The tournament decided the Atlantic Coast Conference champion and guaranteed representative into the 2020 NCAA Division I Men's Soccer Tournament. The final will be played at Sahlen's Stadium in Cary, North Carolina.

== Background ==
The format of the tournament was announced in conjunction with all other ACC fall sports on July 29, 2020.

Due to the ongoing COVID-19 pandemic, the format of the 2020 tournament changed multiple times. Originally, the 2020 ACC Tournament was to only feature 4 teams with all matches played at Sahlen's Stadium to create an "isolation zone" (similar to the 2020 NBA Bubble) to minimize the spread of the pandemic. The semifinals were to be played on November 13, 2020, with the final was to be played on November 15, 2020.

On September 4, 2020, the format again changed, expanding the tournament from four to eight teams. The quarterfinals to be played on November 15, the semifinals on November 18, and the championship game on November 22.

== Qualification ==
Due to the aforementioned COVID-19 pandemic, only eleven teams participated in the regular season, with Boston College electing to not play. The teams were also divided into a North and South region as opposed to the normal Atlantic and Coastal Divisions. Eight teams qualified for the tournament, the top four teams in each region. In the tournament, teams were paired against the opposite region in the bracket. Higher seeds hosted the quarterfinals and semifinals.

South Region
| Finish | Team | Conference Record |
|---|---|---|
| 1 | Wake Forest | 5–1–0 |
| 2 | North Carolina | 3–1–2 |
| 3 | Clemson | 3–2–1 |
| 4 | Duke | 2–4–0 |
| 5 | NC State | 0–5–1 |

North Region
| Finish | Team | Conference Record |
|---|---|---|
| 1 | Pittsburgh | 4–0–0 |
| 2 | Virginia Tech | 3–1–2 |
| 3 | Notre Dame | 3–2–0 |
| 4 | Virginia | 2–3–1 |
| 5 | Louisville | 1–4–1 |
| 6 | Syracuse | 0–3–2 |

== Fall tournament ==
Quarterfinals; November 15
N1 | Pittsburgh | 2
S4 | Duke | 1
S2 | North Carolina | 0
N3 | Notre Dame | 1^{OT}
S1 | Wake Forest | 0
N4 | Virginia | 2
N2 | Virginia Tech | 1
S3 | Clemson | 4

Semifinals; November 18
N1 | Pittsburgh | 3
N3 | Notre Dame | 1
N4 | Virginia | 1
S3 | Clemson | 2

Final; November 22
N1 | Pittsburgh | 1
S3 | Clemson | 2

=== Quarterfinals ===
November 15, 2020
Noon

| Virginia Tech | 1–4 | Clemson |
|---|---|---|
| Daniel Pereira (yellow card) 59'; Jacob Labovitz (yellow card) 66'; Kristo Strickler 70' | Report | 15', 30', 33' Kimarni Smith; 55' James Brighton; (yellow card) 60' Charlie Asensio |

Koskinen Stadium, Durham, NC
Attendance: 0
Referee: Mike Stutt

November 15, 2020
2:00 p.m.

| North Carolina | 0–1 (a.e.t.) OT | Notre Dame |
|---|---|---|
| | Report | (yellow card) 35' Mohamed Omar; (yellow card) 38' Mohammad Abualnadi; 99' Aiden McFadden |

Dorrance Field, Chapel Hill, NC
Attendance: 0
Referee: John McCloskey

November 15, 2020
4:00 p.m.

| Wake Forest | 0–2 | Virginia |
|---|---|---|
| | Report | 30', 51', (yellow card) 45' Cabrel Happi Kamseu; (yellow card) 75' Jeremy Verley; (yellow card) 78' Andreas Ueland; (yellow card) 88' Kevin Ogudugu |

Spry Stadium, Winston–Salem, NC
Attendance: 100
Referee: David Erbacher

November 15, 2020
6:00 p.m.

| Pittsburgh | 2–1 | Duke |
|---|---|---|
| Jackson Walti 33'; Valentin Noël 61', (yellow card) 61' | Report | (yellow card) 7' Antonio Lopez; (yellow card) 13' (red card) 90' Matthias Frick; (yellow card) 43', (goal) 58' Stephen O'Connell; (yellow card) 55' Scotty Taylor |

Dail Soccer Field, Raleigh, NC
Attendance: 77
Referee: Sorin Stoica

=== Semifinals ===
November 18, 2020
6:00 p.m.

| Clemson | 2–1 | Virginia |
|---|---|---|
| Kimarni Smith 22'; Luis Felipe Fernandez-Salvador 86' (pen.), (yellow card) 86' | Report | (yellow card) 77' Jeremy Verley; 84' Axel Gunnarsson; (yellow card) 86' Colin Shutler |

Dorrance Field, Chapel Hill, NC
Attendance: 50
Referee: John Brady

November 18, 2020
8:00 p.m.

| Pittsburgh | 3–1 | Notre Dame |
|---|---|---|
| Veljko Petkovic 20', 43'; Jackson Walti (yellow card) 28'; Valentin Noël 33' | Report | (yellow card) 62' Aiden McFadden; (yellow card) 63' Philip Quinton; 86' (pen.) Jack Lynn |

Dail Soccer Field, Raleigh, NC
Attendance: 100
Referee: Carmen Serbio

=== Final ===
November 22, 2020
12:00 pm

| Pittsburgh | 1–2 | Clemson |
|---|---|---|
| Raphael Crivello (yellow card) 38'; Valentin Noël 47'; Filip Mirkovic (yellow card) 48'; Anass Amrani (red card) 87' | Report | 13' Mohamed Seye; 71' James Brighton; (yellow card) 83' John Martin; (yellow card) 84' Kimarni Smith |

WakeMed Soccer Park, Cary, NC
Attendance: 350
Referee: Nikola Aleksic

== Spring Tournament ==
The ACC played a six-game conference schedule in the spring. The division winners, along with the fall tournament winners, Clemson, played for the ACC's automatic bid to the 2020 NCAA Division I men's soccer tournament. As a result of Clemson winning the Atlantic division in the spring, Pittsburgh and Clemson played one game to determine the conference's automatic qualifier.

| Semifinal | | | Final |
| | | | 1 | Clemson | 2 |
| 2 | Clemson | - | | Pittsburgh | 0 |
| 3 | Pittsburgh | - |

=== Semifinal ===
April 13, 2021

| Clemson | x–x | Pittsburgh |

=== Final ===
April 17, 2021
7:00 p.m.
NCAA Play-In Final

| Clemson | 2–0 | Pittsburgh |
|---|---|---|
| Quinn McNeill 16', (yellow card) 83'; Isaiah Reid 82', (yellow card) 87' | Report | (yellow card) 78' Raphael Crivello; (yellow card) 80' Luke Mort |

Riggs Field, Clemson, SC
Attendance: 1,000
Referee: David Erbacher

== Statistics ==
=== Goalscorers ===
4 Goals

- (England) Kimarni Smith – Clemson

3 Goals

- (France) Valentin Noël – Pittsburgh

2 Goals

- (United States) James Brighton – Clemson
- (Zimbabwe) Cabrel Happi Kamseu – Virginia
- (Serbia) Veljko Petković – Pittsburgh

1 Goal

- (Ecuador) Luis Felipe Fernandez-Salvador – Clemson
- (Sweden) Axel Gunnarsson – Virginia
- (United States) Jack Lynn – Notre Dame
- (United States) Aiden McFadden – Notre Dame
- (United States) Stephen O'Connell – Duke
- (Spain) Mohamed Seye – Clemson
- (United States) Kristo Strickler – Virginia Tech
- (Switzerland) Jackson Walti – Pittsburgh

== All-Tournament team ==
| Player | Team |
|---|---|
**2020 ACC Men's Soccer All-Tournament team**
| **Kimarni Smith** | Clemson |
| Justin Malou | Clemson |
| Grayson Barber | Clemson |
| Philip Mayaka | Clemson |
| Nico Campuzano | Pitt |
| Valentin Noël | Pitt |
| Veljko Petković | Pitt |
| Mohamed Omar | Notre Dame |
| Jack Lynn | Notre Dame |
| Andreas Ueland | Virginia |
| Bret Halsey | Virginia |

MVP in Bold
