= 2020 Clemson Tigers men's soccer team =

American college soccer season

2020 Clemson Tigers men's soccer

ACC Tournament Spring ACC Coastal Division

NCAA Tournament, Third Round
- Conference: Atlantic Coast Conference
- U. Soc. Coaches poll: No. 7
- TopDrawerSoccer.com: No. 9
- Record: 14–3–3 (7–3–2 ACC)
- Head coach: Mike Noonan (11th season)
- Assistant coaches: Philip Jones (8th season); Camilo Rodriguez (5th season)
- Captains: George Marks; James Brighton
- Home stadium: Riggs Field

2020 ACC men's fall soccer standings
	Conf.					Overall
Team	W		L		T	W		L		T
North
No. 2 Pittsburgh	4	–	0	–	0	7	–	1	–	0
No. 4 Virginia Tech	3	–	1	–	2	3	–	2	–	2
Notre Dame	3	–	2	–	0	5	–	4	–	0
Virginia	2	–	3	–	1	3	–	4	–	1
Louisville	1	–	4	–	1	1	–	6	–	1
Syracuse	0	–	3	–	2	0	–	3	–	2
South
No. 3 Wake Forest	5	–	1	–	0	7	–	2	–	0
North Carolina	3	–	1	–	2	3	–	2	–	2
No. 1 Clemson‡	3	–	2	–	1	8	–	2	–	1
Duke	2	–	4	–	0	2	–	6	–	0
NC State	0	–	5	–	1	0	–	6	–	1
Boston College†	0	–	0	–	0	0	–	0	–	0
‡ – 2020 ACC Tournament champion; As of March 9, 2021; Rankings from United Soccer Coaches; Source:The ACC; Note: † Due to COVID-19, Boston College suspended the Fall 2020 men's soccer season; begins play in March.

2020 ACC men's spring soccer standings
	Conf.					Overall
Team	W		L		T	W		L		T
Atlantic
No. 7 Clemson ‡	4	–	1	–	1	14	–	3	–	3
Louisville	4	–	2	–	0	5	–	8	–	1
No. 6 Wake Forest +	3	–	0	–	2	13	–	3	–	2
NC State	1	–	2	–	3	3	–	8	–	4
Boston College *	1	–	3	–	1	1	–	3	–	1
Syracuse	0	–	3	–	1	2	–	7	–	4
Coastal
No. 3 Pittsburgh +	5	–	1	–	0	16	–	4	–	0
No. 4 North Carolina +	4	–	1	–	1	9	–	5	–	4
Duke	2	–	3	–	1	3	–	10	–	3
Virginia	2	–	4	–	0	7	–	8	–	1
No. 15 Virginia Tech +	2	–	4	–	0	7	–	6	–	4
Notre Dame	1	–	5	–	0	8	–	9	–	0
‡ – 2020 ACC Fall Tournament champion + – Also invited to the 2020 NCAA Tournament; As of May 18, 2021; Rankings from United Soccer Coaches; Source:The ACC; Note: *- Due to COVID-19, Boston College suspended the Fall 2020 men's soccer season; began play in March.

The 2020 Clemson Tigers men's soccer team represented Clemson University during the 2020 NCAA Division I men's soccer season. The Tigers were led by head coach Mike Noonan, in his eleventh season. They played home games at Riggs Field. This was the team's 60th season playing organized men's college soccer and their 33rd playing in the Atlantic Coast Conference.

The teams' 2020 season was significantly impacted by the COVID-19 pandemic, which curtailed the fall season and caused the NCAA Tournament to be played in spring 2021. The ACC was one of the only two conferences in men's soccer to play in the fall of 2020. The ACC also held a mini-season during the spring of 2021.

The Tigers finished the fall season 8–2–1 and 3–2–1 in ACC play to finish in third place in the North Division. They won the ACC Tournament by defeating Virginia Tech, Virginia and Pittsburgh in the final. They finished the spring season 4–1–1 and 4–1–1 in ACC play, to finish in first place in the Atlantic Division. They received the ACC's automatic bid to the NCAA Tournament after defeating Pittsburgh in a game for the bid. As the first seed in the tournament, they defeated American in the Second Round before losing to Marshall in the Third Round on penalty kicks to end their season.

== Background ==
The 2019 Clemson men's soccer team finished the season with a 18–2–2 overall record and a 6–1–1 ACC record. The Tigers won the Atlantic Coast Conference Atlantic Division, and were seeded first–overall in the 2019 ACC Men's Soccer Tournament. They defeated Notre Dame and Pittsburgh before falling to Virginia in the final. The Tigers received an at-large bid to the 2019 NCAA Division I Men's Soccer Tournament. Seeded second-overall, they defeated Charlotte and Providence before losing to Stanford in the Quarterfinals.

At the end of the season, three Tigers men's soccer players wer selected in the 2020 MLS SuperDraft: Robbie Robinson, Tanner Dieterich, and Malick Mbaye.

== Player movement ==
=== Players leaving ===
Name	Number	Pos.	Height	Weight	Year	Hometown	Reason for departure
Daniel Kuzemka	1	GK	6'1"	185	(redshirt) Sophomore	Clifton, Virginia	Transferred to Charlotte
Judson Burns	2	DF	5'8"	165	Freshman	Argyle, Texas	Transferred to SMU
Malick Mbaye	5	DF	6'0"	168	Senior	Dakar, Senegal	Drafted 33rd overall in the 2020 MLS SuperDraft by Toronto FC
Tanner Dieterich	6	DF	6'0"	170	Senior	Nashville, Tennessee	Drafted 28th overall in the 2020 MLS SuperDraft by Nashville SC
Robbie Robinson	7	FW	6'2"	170	Junior	Camden, South Carolina	Drafted 1st overall in the 2020 MLS SuperDraft by Inter Miami
Adrian Nunez	10	FW	5'7"	150	Senior	San José, Costa Rica	Graduated
Adam Yorke	12	FW	6'1"	175	Freshman	Redondo Beach, California	
Cale Thorne	16	MF	6'0"	193	(redshirt) Junior	Baltimore, Maryland	Graduated
Izzy Garcia-Perez	21	FW	5'9"	157	(redshirt) Freshman	Asheville, North Carolina	
Nolan Lennon	22	GK	6'2"	190	(redshirt) Senior	Piedmont, South Carolina	Graduated
Sindri Björnsson	23	MF	6'1"	180	Junior	Brieðholt, Iceland	Transferred to Villanova
Nate Hall	28	FW	5'4"	145	(redshirt) Junior	Baltimore, Maryland	Graduated

=== Players arriving ===
Name	Nat.	Hometown	Club	TDS Rating
Hamady Diop; DF	SEN	Dakar, Senegal	Montverde Academy	3/5 stars
Ben Erkens; DF	USA	Greenville, SC	Carolina Elite Soccer Academy	3/5 stars
Joshua Hallenberger; MF	USA	Perland, TX	Houston Dynamo	3/5 stars
Trevor Manion; GK	USA	Phoenixville, PA	Penn Fusion SA	3/5 stars
Brandon Parrish; MF	USA	Fairview, TN	Darlington Academy	2/5 stars
Titus Sandy Jr; DF	USA	Matthews, NC	Charlotte Soccer Academy	2/5 stars
Ousmane Sylla; MF	SEN	Dakar, Senegal	Montverde Academy	3/5 stars
Seth Wilson; GK	USA	Frisco, TX	FC Dallas Academy	4/5 stars

== Squad ==
=== Roster ===
Updated March 21, 2021

Note: Flags indicate national team as defined under FIFA eligibility rules; some limited exceptions apply. Players may hold more than one non-FIFA nationality.

No.	Pos.	Nation	Player
0	GK	USA	Max Fisher
1	GK	USA	George Marks (captain)
2	DF	USA	Ben Erkens
3	DF	SWE	Oskar Ågren
4	DF	SEN	Justin Malou
5	DF	SEN	Hamady Diop
6	DF	USA	Dylan Sullivan
8	MF	USA	Callum Johnson
9	FW	ENG	Kimarni Smith
10	MF	ECU	Luis Felipe Fernandez-Salvador
11	FW	USA	Grayson Barber
12	DF	USA	Enrique Montana III
13	MF	USA	John Martin
14	MF	ESP	Mohamed Seye
15	DF	USA	Charlie Asensio

No.	Pos.	Nation	Player
17	MF	USA	Quinn McNeill
18	MF	ESP	Alvaro Gomez
19	FW	USA	Chris Matlashewki
20	MF	KEN	Philip Mayaka
21	MF	SEN	Osmane Sylla
22	GK	USA	Trevor Manion
23	FW	USA	Josh Hallenberger
24	MF	USA	Stirling Russell
25	FW	USA	James Brighton (captain)
26	DF	USA	Jake Barron
27	DF	USA	Isaiah Reid
28	FW	USA	Matthew Boberg
29	MF	USA	Brandon Parrish
30	DF	USA	Titus Sandy Jr.
32	DF	USA	Tyler Hutchinson

Prior to the season, George Marks and James Brighton were named co-captains of the team.

=== Team management ===
Position	Staff
Athletic Director	(United States) Dan Radakovich
Head coach	(United States) Mike Noonan
Associate head coach	(England) Philip Jones
Assistant Coach	(Colombia) Camilo Rodriguez
Director of Operations	(United States) Rob Thompson

== Schedule ==
Date Time, TV	Rank^{#}	Opponent^{#}	Result	Record	Site (Attendance) City, State
Fall Exhibition
September 11, 2020*; 7:00 p.m.		at Virginia	Cancelled	– (–)	Klöckner Stadium; Charlottesville, VA
Fall Regular season
September 18, 2020; 7:00 p.m., ACCN		Wake Forest	Postponted		Riggs Field; Clemson, SC
September 25, 2020; 6:00 p.m., ACCN		North Carolina	Postponted		Riggs Field; Clemson, SC
October 1, 2020*; 7:00 p.m.	No. 3	at South Carolina; Rivalry	W 3–0	1–0–0	Stone Stadium (460); Columbia, SC
October 5, 2020*; 6:00 p.m., ACCN	No. 3	UAB	W 2–0	2–0–0	Riggs Field (748); Clemson, SC
October 9, 2020; 6:00 p.m., ESPNU	No. 3	at North Carolina	L 0–1	2–1–0 (0–1–0)	Dorrance Field (0); Chapel Hill, NC
October 13, 2020; 7:00 p.m., ACCN		No. 1 Wake Forest	W 2–1	3–1–0 (1–1–0)	Riggs Field (1,000); Clemson, SC
October 16, 2020; 8:00 p.m., ACCN		Duke	W 2–1 ^{2OT}	4–1–0 (2–1–0)	Riggs Field (1,000); Clemson, SC
October 23, 2020; 8:00 p.m., ACCN	No. 3	at NC State	W 1–0	5–1–0 (3–1–0)	Dail Soccer Field (88); Raleigh, NC
October 27, 2020; 7:00 p.m., ACCN	No. 3	No. 5 North Carolina	T 3–3 ^{2OT}	5–1–1 (3–1–1)	Riggs Field (1,000); Clemson, SC
October 30, 2020; 6:00 p.m., RSN	No. 3	No. 2 Wake Forest	L 0–2	5–2–1 (3–2–1)	Spry Stadium (0); Winston-Salem, NC
ACC Tournament
November 15, 2020; Noon, ACCN	(S3) No. 4	vs. (N2) No. 5 Virginia Tech; Quarterfinals	W 4–1	6–2–1	Koskinen Stadium (0); Durham, NC
November 18, 2020; 6:00 p.m., ACCN	(S3) No. 2	vs. (N4) Virginia; Semifinals	W 2–1	7–2–1	Dorrance Field (50); Chapel Hill, NC
November 18, 2020; 6:00 p.m., ESPNU	(S3) No. 2	vs. (N1) No. 1 Pittsburgh; Final	W 2–1	8–2–1	WakeMed Soccer Park (350); Cary, NC
Spring Exhibition
February 20, 2021*; 4:00 p.m.		vs. North Carolina	L 0–1	–	CSA OrthoCarolina Sportsplex (0); Pineville, NC
Spring Regular season
March 7, 2021; 5:00 p.m., ACCNX	No. 1	Syracuse	W 3–1	9–2–1 (4–2–1)	Riggs Field (813); Clemson, SC
March 13, 2021; 5:00 p.m., ACCNX	No. 1	at No. 21 Virginia Tech	W 1–0 ^{2OT}	10–2–1 (5–2–1)	Thompson Field (250); Blacksburg, VA
March 20, 2021; 7:00 p.m., ACCNX	No. 1	NC State	W 1–0	11–2–1 (6–2–1)	Riggs Field (753); Clemson, SC
March 27, 2021; 1:00 p.m., ACCNX	No. 1	at Boston College	W 3–2	12–2–1 (7–2–1)	Newton Soccer Complex (35); Chestnut Hill, MA
April 2, 2021; 7:00 p.m., ACCNX	No. 1	No. 4 Wake Forest	T 0–0 ^{2OT}	12–2–2 (7–2–2)	Riggs Field (1,000); Clemson, SC
April 9, 2021; 7:00 p.m., ACCNX	No. 3	at Louisville	L 1–2	12–3–2 (7–3–2)	Lynn Stadium (0); Louisville, KY
NCAA Automatic Bid Play-In
April 17, 2021; 7:00 p.m., ACCN	No. 4	No. 1 Pittsburgh	W 2–0	13–3–2	Riggs Field (1,000); Clemson, SC
NCAA Tournament
May 2, 2021; 5:00 p.m., ESPN3	(1) No. 1	vs. American; Second Round	W 2–1	14–3–2	Spry Stadium (182); Winston-Salem, NC
May 6, 2021; 3:00 p.m., NCAA Livestream	(1) No. 1	vs. No. 10 Marshall; Third Round	T 1–1 (6–7 PKs) ^{2OT}	14–3–3	WakeMed Soccer Park (185); Cary, NC
*Non-conference game. ^{#}Rankings from United Soccer Coaches. (#) Tournament seedings in parentheses.

== Goals Record ==
Rank	No.	Nat.	Po.	Name	Regular season	ACC Tournament	NCAA Tournament	Total
1	9	(England)	FW	Kimarni Smith	4	4	0	8
2	25	(United States)	FW	James Brighton	3	2	1	6
3	16	(United States)	MF	Callum Johnson	4	0	1	5
4	14	(Spain)	MF	Mohamed Seye	2	1	1	4
5	5	(Senegal)	DF	Hamady Diop	2	0	0	2
5	10	(Ecuador)	MF	Luis Felipe Fernandez-Salvador	1	1	0	2
5	11	(United States)	FW	Grayson Barber	2	0	0	2
5	17	(United States)	MF	Quinn McNeill	1	1	0	2
5	27	(United States)	DF	Isaiah Reid	1	1	0	2
10	4	(Senegal)	DF	Justin Malou	1	0	0	1
10	21	(Senegal)	MF	Ousmane Sylla	1	0	0	1
Total					22	10	3	35

== Disciplinary record ==
Rank	No.	Nat.	Po.	Name	Regular Season			ACC Tournament			NCAA Tournament			Total		
Rank	No.	Nat.	Po.	Name	Booked	(yellow card) (yellow-red card)	Sent off (straight red)	Booked	(yellow card) (yellow-red card)	Sent off (straight red)	Booked	(yellow card) (yellow-red card)	Sent off (straight red)	Booked	(yellow card) (yellow-red card)	Sent off (straight red)
1	3	DF	(Sweden)	Oskar Ågren	4	0	0	0	0	0	1	0	0	5	0	0
2	10	MF	(Ecuador)	Luis Felipe Fernandez-Salvador	3	0	0	1	0	0	0	0	0	4	0	0
2	14	FW	(Spain)	Mohamed Seye	2	1	0	0	0	0	1	0	0	3	1	0
4
4	11	FW	(United States)	Grayson Barber	3	0	0	0	0	0	0	0	0	3	0	0
4	20	MF	(Kenya)	Philip Mayaka	3	0	0	0	0	0	0	0	0	3	0	0
6	8	MF	(United States)	Callum Johnson	2	0	0	0	0	0	0	0	0	2	0	0
6	17	MF	(United States)	Quinn McNeill	1	0	0	1	0	0	0	0	0	2	0	0
6	24	MF	(United States)	Stirling Russell	2	0	0	0	0	0	0	0	0	2	0	0
9	4	DF	(Senegal)	Justin Malou	0	0	0	0	0	0	1	0	0	1	0	0
9	5	DF	(Senegal)	Hamady Diop	1	0	0	0	0	0	0	0	0	1	0	0
9	9	FW	(England)	Kimarni Smith	0	0	0	1	0	0	0	0	0	1	0	0
9	13	MF	(United States)	John Martin	0	0	0	1	0	0	0	0	0	1	0	0
9	15	DF	(United States)	Charlie Asensio	0	0	0	1	0	0	0	0	0	1	0	0
9	21	MF	(Senegal)	Osmane Sylla	0	0	0	0	0	0	1	0	0	1	0	0
9	27	DF	(United States)	Isaiah Reid	0	0	0	1	0	0	0	0	0	1	0	0
9	29	FW	(United States)	Brandon Parrish	1	0	0	0	0	0	0	0	0	1	0	0
Total					21	1	0	6	0	0	4	0	0	31	1	0

== Awards and honors ==
Recipient	Award	Date	Ref.
Mohamed Seye	Co-offensive Player of the Week	October 5, 2020	
Kimarni Smith	Co-offensive Player of the Week	October 19, 2020	
George Marks	Defensive Player of the Week	October 19, 2020	
Grayson Barber	Co-offensive Player of the Week	October 26, 2020	
Oskar Ågren	Defensive Player of the Week	October 26, 2020	
Kimarni Smith	All-ACC Tournament Team	November 22, 2020	
Justin Malou	All-ACC Tournament Team	November 22, 2020	
Grayson Barber	All-ACC Tournament Team	November 22, 2020	
Philip Mayaka	All-ACC Tournament Team	November 22, 2020	
Kimarni Smith	ACC Tournament MVP	November 22, 2020	
Justin Malou	MAC Hermann Trophy Watchlist	January 28, 2021	
Kimarni Smith	MAC Hermann Trophy Watchlist	January 28, 2021	
Grayson Barber	All ACC First-Team	April 14, 2021	
Philip Mayaka	All ACC First-Team	April 14, 2021	
Kimarni Smith	All ACC First-Team	April 14, 2021	
Oskar Ågren	All ACC Second-Team	April 14, 2021	
Luis Felipe Fernandez-Salvador	All ACC Third-Team	April 14, 2021	
Justin Malou	All ACC Third-Team	April 14, 2021	
George Marks	All ACC Third-Team	April 14, 2021	
Hamady Diop	All ACC Rookie Team	April 14, 2021	
Ousmane Sylla	All ACC Rookie Team	April 14, 2021	

== 2021 MLS Super Draft ==
Player	Team	Round	Pick #	Position
Philip Mayaka	Colorado Rapids	1	3	MF
Kimarni Smith	D.C. United	1	4	FW
Justin Malou	Columbus Crew	1	27	DF

== Rankings ==
=== Fall 2020 ===
Ranking movement Legend: ██ Improvement in ranking. ██ Decrease in ranking. ██ Not ranked the previous week. RV=Others receiving votes.
Poll	Wk 1	Wk 2	Wk 3	Wk 4	Wk 5	Wk 6	Wk 7	Wk 8	Wk 9	Final
United Soccer	2	3	3		3	3	5	4	2	1

=== Spring 2021 ===
Ranking movement Legend: ██ Improvement in ranking. ██ Decrease in ranking. ██ Not ranked the previous week. RV=Others receiving votes.
Poll	Pre	Wk 1	Wk 2	Wk 3	Wk 4	Wk 5	Wk 6	Wk 7	Wk 8	Wk 9	Wk 10	Wk 11	Wk 12	Wk 13	Final
United Soccer	None Released				1 (16)	1 (23)	1 (19)	1 (24)	1 (23)	3 (4)	4 (1)	1 (21)	None Released		7
TopDrawer Soccer	2	2	2	2	2	1	1	1	1	1	5	1	1	9	9
