= 2020 Virginia Tech Hokies men's soccer team =

American college soccer season

2020 Virginia Tech Hokies men's soccer

NCAA Tournament, Third Round
- Conference: Atlantic Coast Conference
- U. Soc. Coaches poll: No. 15
- TopDrawerSoccer.com: No. 16
- Record: 7–6–4 (5–5–2 ACC)
- Head coach: Mike Brizendine (12th season)
- Assistant coaches: Patrick McSorley (11th season); Josh Dunn (2nd season)
- Home stadium: Thompson Field

2020 ACC men's fall soccer standings
	Conf.					Overall
Team	W		L		T	W		L		T
North
No. 2 Pittsburgh	4	–	0	–	0	7	–	1	–	0
No. 4 Virginia Tech	3	–	1	–	2	3	–	2	–	2
Notre Dame	3	–	2	–	0	5	–	4	–	0
Virginia	2	–	3	–	1	3	–	4	–	1
Louisville	1	–	4	–	1	1	–	6	–	1
Syracuse	0	–	3	–	2	0	–	3	–	2
South
No. 3 Wake Forest	5	–	1	–	0	7	–	2	–	0
North Carolina	3	–	1	–	2	3	–	2	–	2
No. 1 Clemson‡	3	–	2	–	1	8	–	2	–	1
Duke	2	–	4	–	0	2	–	6	–	0
NC State	0	–	5	–	1	0	–	6	–	1
Boston College†	0	–	0	–	0	0	–	0	–	0
‡ – 2020 ACC Tournament champion; As of March 9, 2021; Rankings from United Soccer Coaches; Source:The ACC; Note: † Due to COVID-19, Boston College suspended the Fall 2020 men's soccer season; begins play in March.

2020 ACC men's spring soccer standings
	Conf.					Overall
Team	W		L		T	W		L		T
Atlantic
No. 7 Clemson ‡	4	–	1	–	1	14	–	3	–	3
Louisville	4	–	2	–	0	5	–	8	–	1
No. 6 Wake Forest +	3	–	0	–	2	13	–	3	–	2
NC State	1	–	2	–	3	3	–	8	–	4
Boston College *	1	–	3	–	1	1	–	3	–	1
Syracuse	0	–	3	–	1	2	–	7	–	4
Coastal
No. 3 Pittsburgh +	5	–	1	–	0	16	–	4	–	0
No. 4 North Carolina +	4	–	1	–	1	9	–	5	–	4
Duke	2	–	3	–	1	3	–	10	–	3
Virginia	2	–	4	–	0	7	–	8	–	1
No. 15 Virginia Tech +	2	–	4	–	0	7	–	6	–	4
Notre Dame	1	–	5	–	0	8	–	9	–	0
‡ – 2020 ACC Fall Tournament champion + – Also invited to the 2020 NCAA Tournament; As of May 18, 2021; Rankings from United Soccer Coaches; Source:The ACC; Note: *- Due to COVID-19, Boston College suspended the Fall 2020 men's soccer season; began play in March.

The 2020 Virginia Tech Hokies men's soccer team represented Virginia Tech during the 2020–21 NCAA Division I men's soccer season. It was the 49th season of the University fielding a program. The Hokies played their home games at Sandra D. Thompson Field in Blacksburg, Virginia. The Hokies were led by twelfth-year head coach Mike Brizendine.

The teams' 2020 season was significantly impacted by the COVID-19 pandemic, which curtailed the fall season and caused the NCAA Tournament to be played in spring 2021. The ACC was one of the only two conferences in men's soccer to play in the fall of 2020. The ACC also held a mini-season during the spring of 2021.

The Hokies finished the fall season 3–2–2 and 3–1–2 in ACC play to finish in second place in the North Division. In the ACC Tournament they lost to Clemson in the Quarterfinals. They finished the spring season 4–4–2 and 2–4–0 in ACC play, to finish in fifth place in the Coastal Division. They received an at-large bid to the NCAA Tournament. They defeated Oregon State in the Second Round before losing to the number six seed Seton Hall in the Third Round to end their season.

== Previous season ==
The 2019 Virginia Tech men's soccer team finished the season with a 10–6–3 overall record and a 2–4–2 ACC record. The Hokies were seeded eleventh–overall in the 2019 ACC Men's Soccer Tournament. The Hokies won their first round match up against Louisville, but fell to Wake Forest in the quarterfinals. The Hokies earned an at-large bid into the 2019 NCAA Division I Men's Soccer Tournament. As the tenth overall seed Virginia Tech defeated New Hampshire in the second round, before losing to Stanford in the third round.

== Preseason ==
=== Player movement ===
==== Players leaving ====
Name	Number	Pos.	Height	Year	Hometown	Reason for departure
Will Mejia	2	DF	6'2"	(redshirt) Senior	Falls Church, VA	Graduated
Jon Ingason	5	DF	6'1"	Senior	Vestmannaeyjar, Iceland	Graduated
Brendan Moyers	6	FW	6'0"	Senior	Earlysville, VA	Graduated
James Kasak	8	FW	5'9"	Senior	Stuarts Draft, VA	Declared for 2020 MLS SuperDraft, drafted 84th overall by Sporting Kansas City
Nikal Clarke-Smith	13	DF	6'2"	Senior	Toronto, Canada	Graduated
Marc Hoppler	17	DF	6'0"	Senior	Lucerne, Switzerland	Graduated

==== Players arriving ====
Name	Nat.	Hometown	Club	TDS Rating
Emmanuel Ameres; MF	USA	Palmetto, FL	Clearwater Chargers	3/5 stars
Welnilton Da Silva; DF	BRA	Para, Brazil	SIMA	2/5 stars
Jack Dearie; DF	USA	Ponta Vedra Beach, FL	Beachside Academy	2/5 stars
Cameron Joice; FW	AUS	Newcastle, Australia	Lake Ginninderra Secondary College	0/5 stars
Oryem Kilama; FW	USA	Wilmington, DE	Delaware FC	3/5 stars
Ethan Stevenson; FW	USA	Clover, SC	Charlotte Independence SC	2/5 stars

==== Transfers ====
Name	Nat.	No.	Pos.	Height	Year	Hometown	Notes
Mayola Kinua	GHA	8	MF	5 ft 8 in (1.73 m)	Sophomore	Elk Creek, VA	Transferred from Appalachian State

=== Preseason rankings ===
==== ACC Media Poll ====
The ACC men's soccer media poll was released on September 8, 2020. Virginia Tech was picked to finish third in the ACC North Division.

Coaches' Poll
Predicted finish	Team	Points
1	Virginia	59 (9)
2	Pitt	44 (2)
3	Virginia Tech	35
4	Syracuse	30
5	Louisville	29
6	Notre Dame	28

=== Preseason honors and awards ===
All-ACC Preseason Team

- Kristo Strickler, Senior, Forward

== Squad ==
=== Roster ===
Updated: December 10, 2020

Note: Flags indicate national team as defined under FIFA eligibility rules; some limited exceptions apply. Players may hold more than one non-FIFA nationality.

No.	Pos.	Nation	Player
0	GK	USA	Connor Jordan-Hyde
1	GK	NED	Mathijs Swaneveld
2	DF	USA	Jack Dearie
3	DF	NOR	Sivert Haugli
4	MF	USA	Kyle Stenzel
5	DF	BRA	Welnilton da Silva II
6	MF	AUS	Camron Joice
7	FW	USA	Oreyem Kilama
8	MF	GHA	Mayola Kinyua
9	MF	VEN	Daniel Pereira
10	MF	USA	Chris Little
11	FW	USA	Daniel Starr
12	MF	USA	Andrew Weber
14	FW	USA	Kahlil Dover
15	MF	USA	Kristo Strickler

No.	Pos.	Nation	Player
16	MF	ISL	Birkir Eythorsson
17	FW	USA	Nick Backlock
18	FW	USA	Jacob Labovitz
19	DF	USA	Nathan Durst
20	MF	USA	Landon Ameres
21	MF	USA	Camron Lennon
22	DF	USA	Mason McClendon
23	DF	USA	J.P. Pascarella
24	MF	ENG	Kyle McDowell
25	GK	USA	Matt Zambetti
26	DF	USA	Chris Nicola
27	GK	USA	Hayden Kickbush
28	DF	USA	Zane Bubb
30	FW	GHA	Alex Adjetey
31	FW	GER	Jakob Bluemler

=== Team management ===
Position	Staff
Athletic Director	Whit Babcock
Head coach	Mike Brizendine
Assistant Coach	Patrick McSorley
Assistant Coach	Josh Dunn

== Schedule ==
Date Time, TV	Rank^{#}	Opponent^{#}	Result	Record	Site (Attendance) City, State
Fall Regular season
October 10, 2020; 7:00 p.m.		at No. 2 Pittsburgh	L 2–4	0–1–0 (0–1–0)	Ambrose Urbanic Field (55); Pittsburgh, PA
October 14, 2020; 6:00 p.m.		No. 5 Virginia; Commonwealth Clash	T 1–1 ^{2OT}	0–1–1 (0–1–1)	Thompson Field (130); Blacksburg, VA
October 24, 2020; 6:30 p.m.		Syracuse	T 1–1 ^{2OT}	0–1–2 (0–1–2)	Thompson Field (101); Blacksburg, VA
October 30, 2020; 7:00 p.m.		at Louisville	W 2–1 ^{OT}	1–1–2 (1–1–2)	Lynn Stadium (212); Louisville, KY
November 2, 2020; 1:00 p.m.		Notre Dame	W 1–0	2–1–2 (2–1–2)	Alumni Stadium (0); South Bend, IN
November 6, 2020; 7:00 p.m.		Virginia; Commonwealth Clash	W 1–0	3–1–2 (3–1–2)	Klöckner Stadium; Charlottesville, VA
ACC Tournament
November 15, 2020; Noon	(N2) No. 5	vs. (S3) No. 4 Clemson; Quarterfinals	L 1–4	3–2–2	Koskinen Stadium; Durham, NC
Spring Exhibition
February 19, 2021; 5:00 p.m.		at VCU	Canceled due to COVID-19		Sports Backers Stadium; Richmond, VA
February 23, 2021; 2:00 p.m.		at Virginia; Commonwealth Clash	W 1–0	–	Klöckner Stadium; Charlottesville, VA
Spring Regular season
February 28, 2021; 1:00 p.m.		at Coastal Carolina	W 2–0	4–2–2	CCU Soccer Field (200); Conway, SC
March 6, 2021; 1:00 p.m.	No. 13	Duke	L 2–4	4–3–2 (3–2–2)	Thompson Field (250); Blacksburg, VA
March 13, 2021; 5:00 p.m.	No. 21	No. 1 Clemson	L 0–1 ^{2OT}	4–4–2 (3–3–2)	Thompson Field (250); Blacksburg, VA
March 19, 2021; 2:00 p.m., ACCNX		at Virginia; Commonwealth Clash	L 0–2	4–5–2 (3–4–2)	Klöckner Stadium (187); Charlottesville, VA
March 27, 2021; 1:00 p.m.		No. 5 Pittsburgh	L 1–2 ^{2OT}	4–6–2 (3–5–2)	Thompson Field (600); Blacksburg, VA
April 2, 2021; 7:00 p.m.		at No. 15 North Carolina	W 1–0	5–6–2 (4–5–2)	Dorrance Field (423); Chapel Hill, NC
April 9, 2021; 7:00 p.m.		at Notre Dame	W 2–0	6–6–2 (5–5–2)	Alumni Stadium (203); South Bend, IN
April 17, 2021*; 5:00 p.m.		UMass	T 3–3 ^{2OT}	6–6–3	Thompson Field (600); Blacksburg, VA
NCAA Tournament
May 2, 2021; 4:00 p.m.		vs. No. 15 Oregon State; Second Round	W 2–1 ^{OT}	7–6–3	Bryan Park (300); Browns Summit, NC
May 6, 2021; 9:00 p.m., NCAA Livestream		vs. (6) No. 6 Seton Hall; Third Round	T 2–2 (6–7 PKs) ^{2OT}	7–6–4	WakeMed Soccer Park; Cary, NC
*Non-conference game. ^{#}Rankings from United Soccer Coaches. (#) Tournament seedings in parentheses.

== Honors and awards ==
Recipient	Award	Date	Ref.
Jacob Labovitz	ACC Offensive Player of the Week	November 2, 2020	
Kristo Strickler	MAC Hermann Trophy Watchlist	January 28, 2021	
Nathan Durst	ACC Defensive Player of the Week	April 5, 2021	
Kristo Strickler	ACC Offensive Player of the Week	April 5, 2021	
Daniel Pereira	All ACC First-Team	April 14, 2021	
Kristo Strickler	All ACC First-Team	April 14, 2021	
Jacob Labovitz	All ACC Third-Team	April 14, 2021	
Kristo Strickler	ACC Midfielder of the Year	April 14, 2021	

== Rankings ==
=== Fall 2020 ===
Ranking movement Legend: ██ Improvement in ranking. ██ Decrease in ranking. ██ Not ranked the previous week. RV=Others receiving votes.
Poll	Wk 1	Wk 2	Wk 3	Wk 4	Wk 5	Wk 6	Wk 7	Wk 8	Wk 9	Final
United Soccer								5		4

=== Spring 2021 ===
Ranking movement Legend: ██ Improvement in ranking. ██ Decrease in ranking. ██ Not ranked the previous week. RV=Others receiving votes.
Poll	Pre	Wk 1	Wk 2	Wk 3	Wk 4	Wk 5	Wk 6	Wk 7	Wk 8	Wk 9	Wk 10	Wk 11	Wk 12	Wk 13	Final
United Soccer	None Released				13	21					25	RV	None Released		15
TopDrawer Soccer	11	10	10	10	10	17	18						15	16	16

== 2021 MLS SuperDraft ==
Player	Team	Round	Pick #	Position
Daniel Pereira	Austin FC	1	1	MF
Kristofer Strickler	Houston Dynamo	2	30	FW
