= 2020 Wake Forest Demon Deacons men's soccer team =

American college soccer season

2020 Wake Forest Demon Deacons men's soccer

NCAA Tournament, Quarterfinals
- Conference: Atlantic Coast Conference
- U. Soc. Coaches poll: No. 6
- TopDrawerSoccer.com: No. 5
- Record: 13–3–2 (8–1–2 ACC)
- Head coach: Bobby Muuss (6th season)
- Assistant coaches: Steve Armas (6th season); Dane Brenner (10th season); Jonathan Lagos (2nd season)
- Home stadium: Spry Stadium

2020 ACC men's fall soccer standings
	Conf.					Overall
Team	W		L		T	W		L		T
North
No. 2 Pittsburgh	4	–	0	–	0	7	–	1	–	0
No. 4 Virginia Tech	3	–	1	–	2	3	–	2	–	2
Notre Dame	3	–	2	–	0	5	–	4	–	0
Virginia	2	–	3	–	1	3	–	4	–	1
Louisville	1	–	4	–	1	1	–	6	–	1
Syracuse	0	–	3	–	2	0	–	3	–	2
South
No. 3 Wake Forest	5	–	1	–	0	7	–	2	–	0
North Carolina	3	–	1	–	2	3	–	2	–	2
No. 1 Clemson‡	3	–	2	–	1	8	–	2	–	1
Duke	2	–	4	–	0	2	–	6	–	0
NC State	0	–	5	–	1	0	–	6	–	1
Boston College†	0	–	0	–	0	0	–	0	–	0
‡ – 2020 ACC Tournament champion; As of March 9, 2021; Rankings from United Soccer Coaches; Source:The ACC; Note: † Due to COVID-19, Boston College suspended the Fall 2020 men's soccer season; begins play in March.

2020 ACC men's spring soccer standings
	Conf.					Overall
Team	W		L		T	W		L		T
Atlantic
No. 7 Clemson ‡	4	–	1	–	1	14	–	3	–	3
Louisville	4	–	2	–	0	5	–	8	–	1
No. 6 Wake Forest +	3	–	0	–	2	13	–	3	–	2
NC State	1	–	2	–	3	3	–	8	–	4
Boston College *	1	–	3	–	1	1	–	3	–	1
Syracuse	0	–	3	–	1	2	–	7	–	4
Coastal
No. 3 Pittsburgh +	5	–	1	–	0	16	–	4	–	0
No. 4 North Carolina +	4	–	1	–	1	9	–	5	–	4
Duke	2	–	3	–	1	3	–	10	–	3
Virginia	2	–	4	–	0	7	–	8	–	1
No. 15 Virginia Tech +	2	–	4	–	0	7	–	6	–	4
Notre Dame	1	–	5	–	0	8	–	9	–	0
‡ – 2020 ACC Fall Tournament champion + – Also invited to the 2020 NCAA Tournament; As of May 18, 2021; Rankings from United Soccer Coaches; Source:The ACC; Note: *- Due to COVID-19, Boston College suspended the Fall 2020 men's soccer season; began play in March.

The 2020 Wake Forest Demon Deacons men's soccer team represented Wake Forest University during the 2020 NCAA Division I men's soccer season. It was the 74th season of the university fielding a program. It was the program's sixth season with Bobby Muuss as head coach. The Demon Deacons played their home matches at Spry Stadium.

The teams' 2020 season was significantly impacted by the COVID-19 pandemic, which curtailed the fall season and caused the NCAA Tournament to be played in spring 2021. The ACC was one of the only two conferences in men's soccer to play in the fall of 2020. The ACC also held a mini-season during the spring of 2021.

The Demon Deacons finished the fall season 5–1–0 and 7–2–0 in ACC play to finish in first place in the South Division. In the ACC Tournament they lost to Virginia in the Quarterfinals. They finished the spring season 4–0–2 and 3–0–2 in ACC play, to finish in third place in the Atlantic Division. They received an at-large bid to the NCAA Tournament. As the fifth seed in the tournament, they defeated Coastal Carolina in the Second Round and Kentucky in the Third Round before losing to North Carolina in the Quarterfinals to end their season.

== Background ==
The 2019 Wake Forest men's soccer team finished the season with a 16–5–2 overall record and a 6–2–0 ACC record. The Demon Deacons were seeded third–overall in the 2019 ACC Men's Soccer Tournament, where they defeated Virginia Tech in the Quarterfinals, but lost to eventual champions Virginia in the Semifinals. The Demon Deacons earned an at-large bid into the 2019 NCAA Division I Men's Soccer Tournament. As the fourth–overall seed in the tournament, Wake Forest defeated Maryland, Michigan, and UC Santa Barbara before being defeated by eventual runners-up Virginia in the Semifinals.

At the end of the season, two Demon Deacons men's soccer players were selected in the 2020 MLS SuperDraft: Alistair Johnston and Joey DeZart.

== Player movement ==
=== Players leaving ===
Name	Number	Pos.	Height	Weight	Year	Hometown	Reason for departure
Andreu Cases Mundet	1	GK	6'0"	165	Senior	Barcelona, Spain	Graduated
Justyn Thomas	6	DF	6'0"	175	Junior	Keswick, Ontario	
Alistair Johnson	8	MF	5'11"	170	Senior	Aurora, Ontario	Declared for 2020 MLS SuperDraft; drafted 11th overall by Nashville
Tater Rennhack	9	FW	5'11"	165	(redshirt) Senior	Westlake, TX	Graduated
Bruno Lapa	10	MF	5'9"	155	Senior	Curitiba, Brazil	Graduated
Joey DeZart	14	MF	6'1"	195	Senior	Jackson, NJ	Declared for 2020 MLS SuperDraft; drafted 31st overall by Orlando
Eddie Folds	19	DF	5'10"	150	Senior	Columbus, OH	Graduated

=== Players arriving ===
Name	Nat.	Hometown	Club	TDS Rating
Prince Amponsah; DF	USA	Bronx, New York	NYCFC (Academy)	4/5 stars
Cristian Escribano; DF	USA	Frisco, TX	FC Dallas (Academy)	3/5 stars
Jahlane Forbes; DF	USA	Clermont, FL	Orlando City SC (Academy)	4/5 stars
Hosei Kijima; DF	JPN	Yokohama, Japan	IMG Academy	3/5 stars
Chase Oliver; MF	USA	Kennesaw, GA	Atlanta United (Academy)	3/5 stars
Thomas Raimbault; FW	CAN	Vancouver, BC	Vancouver Whitecaps (Academy)	N/A
Oscar Sears; MF	SWE	Stockholm, Sweden	Danderyds Gymnasium	4/5 stars
Colin Thomas; MF	USA	Canton, GA	United Futbol Academy	3/5 stars
Garrison Tubbs; DF	USA	Brunswick, GA	Atlanta United (Academy)	3/5 stars

== Squad ==
=== Roster ===
Updated:November 4, 2020

Note: Flags indicate national team as defined under FIFA eligibility rules; some limited exceptions apply. Players may hold more than one non-FIFA nationality.

No.	Pos.	Nation	Player
0	GK	USA	Andrew Pannenberg
2	DF	USA	Koby Carr
3	FW	USA	Kyle Holcomb
4	DF	USA	Holland Rula
5	DF	TRI	Michael DeShields
7	FW	USA	Aristotle Zarris
10	MF	SWE	Oscar Sears
11	MF	JAM	Justin McMaster
12	MF	USA	Takuma Suzuki
13	FW	USA	David Wrona
14	DF	USA	Jahlane Forbes
15	MF	USA	Isaiah Parente
16	DF	JPN	Hosei Kijima
17	MF	USA	Omar Hernandez
19	DF	USA	Cristian Escribano

No.	Pos.	Nation	Player
20	MF	USA	Kyle McCurley
21	MF	USA	Machop Chol
22	FW	NZL	Calvin Harris
23	DF	USA	Nico Benalcazar
24	MF	USA	Jake Swallen
25	MF	PHI	William Valtos
26	MF	USA	Colin Thomas
27	DF	USA	Prince Amponsah
28	DF	USA	Tyrrell Moore
30	GK	USA	Dominic Peters
31	GK	USA	Cole McNally
32	DF	USA	Garrison Tubbs
33	DF	USA	Sebastian Scrivner
34	MF	USA	Chase Oliver

=== Team management ===
Position	Staff
Athletic Director	Ron Wellman
Head coach	Bobby Muuss
Associate head coach	Steve Armas
Assistant Coach	Dane Brenner
Assistant Coach	Jonathan Lagos
Assistant Athletic Trainer	Michael White
Academic Counselor	Brooke Taylor
Sports Performance	David Bass

== Schedule ==
Date Time, TV	Rank^{#}	Opponent^{#}	Result	Record	Site (Attendance) City, State
Exhibition
September 13, 2020*; 7:00 p.m.		Pittsburgh	W 3–2	–	Spry Stadium; Winston–Salem, NC
Fall Regular season
September 25, 2020*; 6:00 p.m., ACCN	No. 1	at Louisville	W 3–1	1–0–0	Lynn Stadium (112); Louisville, KY
October 3, 2020; 7:00 p.m., ACCNX	No. 1	NC State	W 4–1	2–0–0 (1–0–0)	Spry Stadium; Winston–Salem, NC
October 10, 2020*; 7:30 p.m., ACCN	No. 1	UAB	W 2–0	3–0–0 (1–0–0)	Spry Stadium (748); Winston–Salem, NC
October 13, 2020; 7:00 p.m., ACCN	No. 1	at Clemson	L 1–2	3–1–0 (1–1–0)	Riggs Field (1,000); Clemson, SC
October 18, 2020; 6:00 p.m., ACCNX	No. 1	No. 3 North Carolina	W 1–0 ^{OT}	4–1–0 (2–1–0)	Spry Stadium; Winston–Salem, NC
October 23, 2020; 6:00 p.m., ACCN	No. 2	at Duke	W 2–1	5–1–0 (3–1–0)	Koskinen Stadium; Durham, NC
October 30, 2020; 5:00 p.m., RSN	No. 2	No. 3 Clemson	W 2–0	6–1–0 (4–1–0)	Spry Stadium; Winston–Salem, NC
November 7, 2020; 7:00 p.m., RSN	No. 2	at NC State	W 2–0	7–1–0 (5–1–0)	Dail Soccer Field (77); Raleigh, NC
ACC Tournament
November 15, 2020; 4:00 p.m., ACCN	(S1) No. 2	(N4) Virginia; Quarterfinals	L 0–2	7–2–0	Spry Stadium (100); Winston–Salem, NC
Spring Regular season
March 1, 2021*; 6:00 p.m., ACCNX		Davidson	W 1–0	8–2–0	Spry Stadium (0); Winston–Salem, NC
March 6, 2021; 7:00 p.m., ACCNX	No. 6	Boston College	W 3–2	9–2–0 (6–1–0)	Spry Stadium (0); Winston–Salem, NC
March 13, 2021; 6:00 p.m., ACCNX	No. 4	NC State	T 0–0 ^{2OT}	9–2–1 (6–1–1)	Spry Stadium (350); Winston–Salem, NC
March 20, 2021; 7:00 p.m.	No. 5	at Notre Dame	W 3–2	10–2–1 (7–1–1)	Alumni Stadium (241); Notre Dame, IN
March 27, 2021; 7:00 p.m., ACCNX	No. 6	Louisville	W 2–1 ^{OT}	11–2–1 (8–1–1)	Spry Stadium (450); Winston–Salem, NC
April 2, 2021; 7:00 p.m., ACCNX	No. 4	at No. 1 Clemson	T 0–0 ^{2OT}	11–2–2 (8–1–2)	Riggs Field (1,000); Clemson, SC
April 9, 2021; 7:00 p.m.	No. 4	at Syracuse	Canceled		SU Soccer Stadium; Syracuse, NY
NCAA Tournament
May 2, 2021; 1:00 p.m., ESPN3	(5) No. 4	No. 25 Coastal Carolina; Second Round	W 3–2	12–2–2	Spry Stadium (509); Winston–Salem, NC
May 6, 2021; 9:00 p.m., NCAA Livestream	(5) No. 4	vs. No. 24 Kentucky; Third Round	W 2–1	13–2–2	WakeMed Soccer Park (156); Cary, NC
May 10, 2021; 5:00 p.m., NCAA Livestream	(5) No. 4	vs. No. 16 North Carolina; Quarterfinals	L 1–2	13–3–2	WakeMed Soccer Park (189); Cary, NC
*Non-conference game. ^{#}Rankings from United Soccer Coaches. (#) Tournament seedings in parentheses.

== Awards and honors ==
Recipient	Award	Date	Ref.
Calvin Harris	ACC Co-offensive Player of the Week	September 28, 2020	
Kyle Holcomb	ACC Co-offensive Player of the Week	October 5, 2020	
Omar Hernandez	ACC Co-offensive Player of the Week	October 26, 2020	
Nico Benalcazar	ACC Defensive Player of the Week	November 2, 2020	
Andrew Pannenberg	ACC Defensive Player of the Week	November 9, 2020	
Calvin Harris	All ACC First-Team	April 14, 2021	
Isaiah Parente	All ACC First-Team	April 14, 2021	
Nico Benalcazar	All ACC Second-Team	April 14, 2021	
Machop Chol	All ACC Second-Team	April 14, 2021	
Kyle Holcomb	All ACC Third-Team	April 14, 2021	
Garrison Tubbs	All ACC Rookie Team	April 14, 2021	

== 2021 MLS Super Draft ==
Player	Team	Round	Pick #	Position
Calvin Harris	FC Cincinnati	1	2	FW
Michael DeShields	D.C. United	1	5	DF
Justin McMaster	Minnesota United	1	17	FW
Andrew Pannenberg	Orlando City	2	49	GK

== Rankings ==
=== Fall 2020 ===
Ranking movement Legend: ██ Improvement in ranking. ██ Decrease in ranking. ██ Not ranked the previous week. RV=Others receiving votes.
Poll	Wk 1	Wk 2	Wk 3	Wk 4	Wk 5	Wk 6	Wk 7	Wk 8	Wk 9	Final
United Soccer	1	1	1	1	2	2	2	2	3	3

=== Spring 2021 ===
Ranking movement Legend: ██ Improvement in ranking. ██ Decrease in ranking. ██ Not ranked the previous week. RV=Others receiving votes.
Poll	Pre	Wk 1	Wk 2	Wk 3	Wk 4	Wk 5	Wk 6	Wk 7	Wk 8	Wk 9	Wk 10	Wk 11	Wk 12	Wk 13	Final
United Soccer	None Released				6	4	5	6	4 (1)	4	5	4 (2)	None Released		6
TopDrawer Soccer	5	5	5	5	5	4	5	4	3	3	2	2	2	2	5
