= 2020 Pittsburgh Panthers men's soccer team =

American college soccer season

2020 Pittsburgh Panthers men's soccer

ACC North Region/Coastal Division Champions

NCAA Tournament, Semifinals
- Conference: Atlantic Coast Conference
- U. Soc. Coaches poll: No. 3
- TopDrawerSoccer.com: No. 3
- Record: 16–4–0 (9–1–0 ACC)
- Head coach: Jay Vidovich (5th season)
- Assistant coaches: Michael Behonick (5th season); Rich Costanzo (4th season)
- Home stadium: Ambrose Urbanic Field

2020 ACC men's fall soccer standings
	Conf.					Overall
Team	W		L		T	W		L		T
North
No. 2 Pittsburgh	4	–	0	–	0	7	–	1	–	0
No. 4 Virginia Tech	3	–	1	–	2	3	–	2	–	2
Notre Dame	3	–	2	–	0	5	–	4	–	0
Virginia	2	–	3	–	1	3	–	4	–	1
Louisville	1	–	4	–	1	1	–	6	–	1
Syracuse	0	–	3	–	2	0	–	3	–	2
South
No. 3 Wake Forest	5	–	1	–	0	7	–	2	–	0
North Carolina	3	–	1	–	2	3	–	2	–	2
No. 1 Clemson‡	3	–	2	–	1	8	–	2	–	1
Duke	2	–	4	–	0	2	–	6	–	0
NC State	0	–	5	–	1	0	–	6	–	1
Boston College†	0	–	0	–	0	0	–	0	–	0
‡ – 2020 ACC Tournament champion; As of March 9, 2021; Rankings from United Soccer Coaches; Source:The ACC; Note: † Due to COVID-19, Boston College suspended the Fall 2020 men's soccer season; begins play in March.

2020 ACC men's spring soccer standings
	Conf.					Overall
Team	W		L		T	W		L		T
Atlantic
No. 7 Clemson ‡	4	–	1	–	1	14	–	3	–	3
Louisville	4	–	2	–	0	5	–	8	–	1
No. 6 Wake Forest +	3	–	0	–	2	13	–	3	–	2
NC State	1	–	2	–	3	3	–	8	–	4
Boston College *	1	–	3	–	1	1	–	3	–	1
Syracuse	0	–	3	–	1	2	–	7	–	4
Coastal
No. 3 Pittsburgh +	5	–	1	–	0	16	–	4	–	0
No. 4 North Carolina +	4	–	1	–	1	9	–	5	–	4
Duke	2	–	3	–	1	3	–	10	–	3
Virginia	2	–	4	–	0	7	–	8	–	1
No. 15 Virginia Tech +	2	–	4	–	0	7	–	6	–	4
Notre Dame	1	–	5	–	0	8	–	9	–	0
‡ – 2020 ACC Fall Tournament champion + – Also invited to the 2020 NCAA Tournament; As of May 18, 2021; Rankings from United Soccer Coaches; Source:The ACC; Note: *- Due to COVID-19, Boston College suspended the Fall 2020 men's soccer season; began play in March.

The 2020 Pittsburgh Panthers men's soccer team represented University of Pittsburgh during the 2020 NCAA Division I men's soccer season. The Panthers were led by head coach Jay Vidovich, in his fifth season. They played home games at Ambrose Urbanic Field. This was the team's 67th season playing organized men's college soccer and their 8th playing in the Atlantic Coast Conference.

The teams' 2020 season was significantly impacted by the COVID-19 pandemic, which curtailed the fall season and caused the NCAA Tournament to be played in spring 2021. The ACC was one of the only two conferences in men's soccer to play in the fall of 2020, during which conference competition was organized in North and South divisions followed by a conference tournament. The ACC also held a mini-season during the spring of 2021 which was organized according to the more typical Atlantic and Coastal divisions and was followed by a one game playoff between the division champions to determine who received the automatic bid to the NCAA tournament.

The Panthers finished the fall season 7–1–0 and 4–0–0 in ACC play to finish in first place in the North Region. In the ACC Tournament they defeated Duke in the Quarterfinals and Notre Dame in the Semifinals before losing to Clemson in the Final. They finished the spring season 6–1–0 and 5–1–0 in ACC play, to finish in first place in the Coastal Division. They received an at-large bid to the NCAA Tournament because they lost the automatic bid play-in game to Clemson. As the second seed in the tournament, they defeated Monmouth in the Second Round, UCF in the Third Round, and Washington in the Quarterfinals before losing to Indiana in the Semifinals to end their season.

== Previous season ==
The 2019 Pittsburgh men's soccer team finished the season with a 10–8–2 overall record and a 4–3–1 ACC record. Pitt were seeded fourth–overall in the 2019 ACC Men's Soccer Tournament. The Panthers won their first round match up against NC State, but fell to Clemson in the semifinals. The Panthers earned an at-large bid into the 2019 NCAA Division I Men's Soccer Tournament, making it their first berth into the NCAA Tournament since 1965. Pitt defeated Lehigh in the first round, before losing to the eventual national champions, Georgetown, in the second round.

== Preseason ==
=== Preseason rankings ===
==== ACC Media Poll ====
The ACC men's soccer media poll was released on September 8, 2020. Pitt was picked to finish second in the ACC North Division.

Coaches' Poll
Predicted finish	Team	Points
1	Virginia	59 (9)
2	Pitt	44 (2)
3	Virginia Tech	35
4	Syracuse	30
5	Louisville	29
6	Notre Dame	28

=== Player movement ===
==== Players leaving ====
Name	Number	Pos.	Height	Weight	Year	Hometown	Reason for departure
Johan Peñaranda	0	GK	5'11"	172	Sophomore	Long Island, NY	Transferred to FIU
Nyk Sessock	2	DF	5'7"	148	Sophomore	Philadelphia, PA	Transferred to Indiana
Chandler Vaughn	3	DF	5'9"	142	Sophomore	Woodbridge, VA	Transferred to St. Louis
Lucas Cyriacus	6	MF	6'0"	172	Freshman	Munich, Germany	Transferred to Manhattan
Braden Kline	7	MF	6'1"	160	Senior	Lancaster, PA	Graduated
Edward Kizza	9	FW	5'9"	170	Junior	Kampala, Uganda	No longer with team
Josh Hesson	12	FW	5'11"	168	Freshman	Wolverhampton, England	Transferred to Delaware
Louis Spicer	17	MF	5'10"	168	(redshirt) Freshman	Cambridge, England	Transferred to Maryland
Tim Townsend	18	MF	5'8"	155	(redshirt) Sophomore	Hummelstown, PA	
Alex Peperak	21	MF	5'10"	170	Senior	Connellsville, PA	Graduated
Chad Stout	25	MF	5'9"	163	(redshirt) Sophomore	Lewisberry, PA	
Tim Ekpone	28	DF	6'0"	160	(redshirt) Junior	Germantown, MD	Transferred to Syracuse
Arie Ammann	32	GK	6'0"	180	(redshirt) Junior	Round Hill, VA	

==== Players arriving ====
Name	Nat.	Hometown	Club	TDS Rating
Vinicius Belon; DF	BRA	Curitiba, Brazil	SIMA	2/5 stars
Brandon Clagette; FW	USA	Atlanta, GA	Atlanta United Academy	2/5 stars
Lucas Matuszewski; DF	USA	York, PA	PA Classics Academy	2/5 stars
Luke Peperak; FW	USA	Pittsburgh, PA	Pittsburgh Riverhounds SC	2/5 stars
Dominic Reiter; DF	USA	Sewickley, PA	Beadling SC	2/5 stars
Soshun Shigaki; MF	JPN	Tokyo, Japan	SIMA	2/5 stars
Nathan Stricker; MF	USA	Sinking Spring, PA	PA Classics Academy	2/5 stars

== Squad ==
=== Roster ===
Updated October 28, 2020

Note: Flags indicate national team as defined under FIFA eligibility rules; some limited exceptions apply. Players may hold more than one non-FIFA nationality.

No.	Pos.	Nation	Player
0	GK	ESP	Nico Campuzano
1	GK	USA	Alexander Steinbach
2	DF	GER	Jasper Löeffelsend
3	DF	FRA	Raphaël Crivello
4	DF	USA	Bryce Washington
5	DF	ESP	Arturo Ordoñez
6	MF	MAR	Anass Amrani
7	MF	MEX	Luis Lara
8	MF	FRA	Valentin Noël
10	FW	FRA	Bertin Jacquesson
11	MF	BRA	Rodrigo Almeida
12	FW	USA	Brandon Clagette
13	FW	USA	Alexander Dexter
14	DF	ESP	Sito Sena

No.	Pos.	Nation	Player
15	FW	USA	Luke Mort
16	DF	USA	Lucas Matuszewski
17	MF	ENG	Louis Spicer
18	MF	JPN	Soshun Shigaki
19	MF	SRB	Veljko Petkovic
20	MF	USA	Matt Bailey
21	MF	SRB	Filip Mirkovic
22	DF	USA	Sebastian Serpa
23	DF	BRA	Vinicius Belon
24	MF	SUI	Jackson Walti
25	FW	USA	Luke Peperak
26	DF	USA	Dominic Reiter
27	DF	USA	Anthony Harding
28	MF	USA	Nathan Stricker

=== Team management ===
Position	Staff
Athletic Director	Heather Lyke
Head coach	Jay Vidovich
Assistant Coach	Michael Behonick
Assistant Coach	Rich Costanzo
Volunteer Assistant Coach	Bryce Cregan

== Schedule ==
Date Time, TV	Rank^{#}	Opponent^{#}	Result	Record	Site (Attendance) City, State
Fall Exhibition
September 13, 2020*; 7:00 p.m.	No. 4	at No. 1 Wake Forest	L 2–3	–	Spry Stadium (0); Winston-Salem, NC
September 19, 2020*; 7:00 p.m.	No. 4	at Louisville	W 5–0	–	Ambrose Urbanic Field (0); Pittsburgh, PA
Fall regular season
September 26, 2020*; 7:00 p.m., ACCNX	No. 4	at No. 5 Notre Dame	W 3–1	1–0–0	Alumni Stadium (0); South Bend, IN
October 6, 2020; 7:00 p.m., ACCNX	No. 2	at Syracuse	W 3–2 ^{2OT}	2–0–0 (1–0–0)	SU Soccer Stadium (1); Syracuse
October 10, 2020; 7:00 p.m., ACCNX	No. 2	Virginia Tech	W 4–2	3–0–0 (2–0–0)	Ambrose Urbanic Field (55); Pittsburgh, PA
October 18, 2020; 7:30 p.m., ACCN	No. 2	at No. 5 Virginia	W 3–2 ^{OT}	4–0–0 (3–0–0)	Klöckner Stadium (132); Charlottesville, VA
October 23, 2020; 7:00 p.m., ACCN	No. 1	at Louisville	W 4–1	5–0–0 (4–0–0)	Lynn Family Stadium; Louisville, KY
October 30, 2020; 6:00 p.m., ACCNX	No. 1	Notre Dame	Canceled	5–0–0 (4–0–0)	Ambrose Urbanic Field; Pittsburgh, PA
November 6, 2020; 6:00 p.m., ACCNX	No. 1	Syracuse	Canceled	5–0–0 (4–0–0)	Ambrose Urbanic Field; Pittsburgh, PA
ACC Tournament
November 15, 2020; 6:00 p.m., ACCN	(1N) No. 1	vs. (4S) Duke; Quarterfinals	W 2–1	6–0–0	Dail Soccer Field; Raleigh, NC
November 18, 2020; 8:00 p.m., ACCN	(1N) No. 1	vs. (3N) Notre Dame; Semifinals	W 3–1	7–0–0	Dail Soccer Field (100); Raleigh, NC
November 22, 2020; Noon, ESPNU	(1N) No. 1	vs. (3S) No. 2 Clemson; Final	L 1–2	7–1–0	WakeMed Soccer Park (350); Cary, NC
Spring Exhibition
February 13, 2021*; 3:00 p.m.		Georgetown	Canceled		Ambrose Urbanic Field; Pittsburgh, PA
Spring regular season
February 21, 2021*; 3:00 p.m.		Akron	Canceled	–	Ambrose Urbanic Field (–); Pittsburgh, PA
February 27, 2021*; 7:00 p.m.		Duquesne; City Game	W 1–0	8–1–0	Ambrose Urbanic Field (0); Pittsburgh, PA
March 5, 2021; 7:00 p.m., ACCNX	No. 4	at North Carolina	L 0–3	8–2–0 (4–1–0)	Dorrance Field (315); Chapel Hill, NC
March 13, 2021; 7:00 p.m., ACCNX	No. 8	Boston College	W 1–0	9–2–0 (5–1–0)	Ambrose Urbanic Field (0); Pittsburgh, PA
March 19, 2021; 7:00 p.m., ACCNX	No. 7	at Duke	W 4–3 ^{2OT}	10–2–0 (6–1–0)	Koskinen Stadium (0); Durham, NC
March 27, 2021; 1:00 p.m., ACCNX	No. 5	at Virginia Tech	W 2–1 ^{2OT}	11–2–0 (7–1–0)	Thompson Field (600); Blacksburg, VA
April 3, 2021; 7:00 p.m., ACCNX	No. 3	Notre Dame	W 2–0	12–2–0 (8–1–0)	Ambrose Urbanic Field (0); Pittsburgh, PA
April 8, 2021; 7:00 p.m., ACCNX	No. 1	Virginia	W 5–0	13–2–0 (9–1–0)	Ambrose Urbanic Field (0); Pittsburgh, PA
NCAA Automatic Bid Play-In
April 17, 2021; 7:00 p.m., ACCN	No. 1	No. 4 Clemson	L 0–2	13–3–0	Riggs Field (1,000); Clemson, SC
NCAA Tournament
May 2, 2021; 8:00 p.m.	(2) No. 3	vs. Monmouth; Second Round	W 6–1	14–3–0	Bryan Park (300); Browns Summit, NC
May 6, 2021; 3:00 p.m.	(2) No. 3	vs. No. 18 UCF; Third Round	W 4–0	15–3–0	WakeMed Soccer Park (86); Cary, NC
May 10, 2021; 1:00 p.m., NCAA Livestream	(2) No. 3	vs. (7) No. 8 Washington; Quarterfinals	W 3–0	16–3–0	WakeMed Soccer Park (74); Cary, NC
May 14, 2021; 8:30 p.m., ESPNU	(2) No. 3	vs. (3) No. 2 Indiana; Semifinals	L 0–1	16–4–0	WakeMed Soccer Park (2,667); Cary, NC
*Non-conference game. ^{#}Rankings from United Soccer Coaches. (#) Tournament seedings in parentheses.

== Awards and honors ==
Recipient	Award	Date	Ref.
Arturo Ordoñez	ACC Defensive Player of the Week	September 28, 2020	
Veljko Petkovic	ACC Offensive Player of the Week	October 12, 2020	
Valentin Noël	ACC Co-Offensive Player of the Week	October 19, 2020	
Nico Campuzano	All-ACC Tournament Team	November 22, 2020	
Veljko Petkovic	All-ACC Tournament Team	November 22, 2020	
Valentin Noël	All-ACC Tournament Team	November 22, 2020	
Veljko Petkovic	MAC Hermann Trophy Watchlist	January 28, 2021	
Valentin Noël	MAC Hermann Trophy Watchlist	January 28, 2021	
Valentin Noël	ACC Co-Offensive Player of the Week	March 22, 2021	
Jackson Walti	ACC Defensive Player of the Week	March 29, 2021	
Jay Vidovich	ACC Coach of the Year	April 14, 2021	
Valentin Noël	ACC Offensive Player of the Year	April 14, 2021	
Jasper Löeffelsend	ACC Defensive Player of the Year	April 14, 2021	
Bertin Jacquesson	ACC Freshman of the Year	April 14, 2021	
Nico Campuzano	All ACC First-Team	April 14, 2021	
Jasper Löeffelsend	All ACC First-Team	April 14, 2021	
Valentin Noël	All ACC First-Team	April 14, 2021	
Bertin Jacquesson	All ACC Second-Team	April 14, 2021	
Veljko Petkovic	All ACC Second-Team	April 14, 2021	
Jackson Walti	All ACC Second-Team	April 14, 2021	
Alexander Dexter	All ACC Third-Team	April 14, 2021	
Arturo Ordoñez	All ACC Third-Team	April 14, 2021	
Bertin Jacquesson	All ACC Rookie Team	April 14, 2021	
Filip Mirkovic	All ACC Rookie Team	April 14, 2021	

== Rankings ==
=== Fall 2020 ===
Ranking movement Legend: ██ Improvement in ranking. ██ Decrease in ranking. ██ Not ranked the previous week. RV=Others receiving votes.
Poll	Wk 1	Wk 2	Wk 3	Wk 4	Wk 5	Wk 6	Wk 7	Wk 8	Wk 9	Final
United Soccer	4	2	2	2	1	1	1	1	1	2

=== Spring 2021 ===
Ranking movement Legend: ██ Improvement in ranking. ██ Decrease in ranking. ██ Not ranked the previous week. RV=Others receiving votes.
Poll	Pre	Wk 1	Wk 2	Wk 3	Wk 4	Wk 5	Wk 6	Wk 7	Wk 8	Wk 9	Wk 10	Wk 11	Wk 12	Wk 13	Final
United Soccer	None Released				4	8	7	5	3 (1)	1 (13)	1 (16)	3 (1)	None Released		3 (2)
TopDrawer Soccer	3	3	3	3	3	7	6	5	4	4	3	6	5	1	3

== 2021 MLS Super Draft ==
Player	Team	Round	Pick #	Position
Edward Kizza	New England Revolution	1	24	FW
