= 2020 North Carolina Tar Heels men's soccer team =

American college soccer season

2020 North Carolina Tar Heels men's soccer

NCAA Tournament, Semifinal
- Conference: Atlantic Coast Conference
- U. Soc. Coaches poll: No. 4
- TopDrawerSoccer.com: No. 4
- Record: 9–5–4 (7–2–3 ACC)
- Head coach: Carlos Somoano (10th season)
- Assistant coaches: Grant Porter (10th season); Will Clayton (3rd season)
- Home stadium: Dorrance Field

2020 ACC men's fall soccer standings
	Conf.					Overall
Team	W		L		T	W		L		T
North
No. 2 Pittsburgh	4	–	0	–	0	7	–	1	–	0
No. 4 Virginia Tech	3	–	1	–	2	3	–	2	–	2
Notre Dame	3	–	2	–	0	5	–	4	–	0
Virginia	2	–	3	–	1	3	–	4	–	1
Louisville	1	–	4	–	1	1	–	6	–	1
Syracuse	0	–	3	–	2	0	–	3	–	2
South
No. 3 Wake Forest	5	–	1	–	0	7	–	2	–	0
North Carolina	3	–	1	–	2	3	–	2	–	2
No. 1 Clemson‡	3	–	2	–	1	8	–	2	–	1
Duke	2	–	4	–	0	2	–	6	–	0
NC State	0	–	5	–	1	0	–	6	–	1
Boston College†	0	–	0	–	0	0	–	0	–	0
‡ – 2020 ACC Tournament champion; As of March 9, 2021; Rankings from United Soccer Coaches; Source:The ACC; Note: † Due to COVID-19, Boston College suspended the Fall 2020 men's soccer season; begins play in March.

2020 ACC men's spring soccer standings
	Conf.					Overall
Team	W		L		T	W		L		T
Atlantic
No. 7 Clemson ‡	4	–	1	–	1	14	–	3	–	3
Louisville	4	–	2	–	0	5	–	8	–	1
No. 6 Wake Forest +	3	–	0	–	2	13	–	3	–	2
NC State	1	–	2	–	3	3	–	8	–	4
Boston College *	1	–	3	–	1	1	–	3	–	1
Syracuse	0	–	3	–	1	2	–	7	–	4
Coastal
No. 3 Pittsburgh +	5	–	1	–	0	16	–	4	–	0
No. 4 North Carolina +	4	–	1	–	1	9	–	5	–	4
Duke	2	–	3	–	1	3	–	10	–	3
Virginia	2	–	4	–	0	7	–	8	–	1
No. 15 Virginia Tech +	2	–	4	–	0	7	–	6	–	4
Notre Dame	1	–	5	–	0	8	–	9	–	0
‡ – 2020 ACC Fall Tournament champion + – Also invited to the 2020 NCAA Tournament; As of May 18, 2021; Rankings from United Soccer Coaches; Source:The ACC; Note: *- Due to COVID-19, Boston College suspended the Fall 2020 men's soccer season; began play in March.

The 2020 North Carolina Tar Heels men's soccer team represented the University of North Carolina at Chapel Hill during the 2020 NCAA Division I men's soccer season. It was the 74th season of the university fielding a program. The Tar Heels were led by tenth year head coach Carlos Somoano and played their home games at Dorrance Field.

The teams' 2020 season was significantly impacted by the COVID-19 pandemic, which curtailed the fall season and caused the NCAA Tournament to be played in spring 2021. The ACC was one of the only two conferences in men's soccer to play in the fall of 2020. The ACC also held a mini-season during the spring of 2021.

The Tar Heels finished the fall season 3–2–2 and 3–1–2 in ACC play to finish in second place in the South Division. In the ACC Tournament lost to Notre Dame in the Quarterfinals. They finished the spring season 4–2–1 and 4–1–1 in ACC play, to finish in second place in the Coastal Division. They received an at-large bid to the NCAA Tournament. As an unseeded team in the tournament, they progressed pass Charlotte in the Second Round via penalties, defeated Stanford in the Third Round, and Wake Forest in the Quarterfinals before losing to Marshall in the Semifinals to end their season.

== Background ==
The 2019 North Carolina men's soccer team finished the season with a 7–7–4 overall record and a 3–5–0 ACC record. The Tar Heels were seeded seventh–overall in the 2019 ACC Men's Soccer Tournament. The Tar Heels were upset in the first round by the tenth seed Syracuse. The Tar Heels were not invited to the 2019 NCAA Division I Men's Soccer Tournament. This marked the first year since 2007 that the Tar Heels were not invited to the NCAA Tournament.

At the end of the season, two Tar Heels men's soccer players wer selected in the 2020 MLS SuperDraft: Jeremy Kelly and Jack Skahan.

== Player movement ==
=== Departures ===
Name	Number	Pos.	Height	Weight	Year	Hometown	Reason for departure
Mauricio Pineda	2	MF	6'1"	175	Senior	Bolingbrook, IL	Graduated
Blake Malone	4	DF	6'0"	165	Freshman	Las Vegas, NV	Signed with Orange County SC
Jack Skahan	8	MF	5'10"	165	Senior	Memphis, TN	Declared for 2020 MLS SuperDraft; selected 27th overall by San Jose Earthquakes
Drew Romig	12	GK	6'1"	186	Senior	Midlothian, VA	Graduated
Lenny Aharon	14	DF	5'8"	169	Freshman	Herzlia, Israel	
Sebastian Berhalter	15	FW	5'10"	154	Freshman	Westerville, OH	Signed with Columbus Crew
Martin Salas	19	MF	5'10"	148	Senior	Dallas, TX	Graduated
Alex Moztarzadeh	20	MF	5'9"	153	Senior	Miami, FL	Graduated
Jake Walker	23	DF	6'0"	160	Sophomore	Davie, FL	
Liam Williams	25	DF	6'0"	178	Junior	Taupō	
Jelani Pieters	26	FW	6'0"	165	Senior	Oswego, IL	Graduated
Raul Aguilera	28	MF	5'9"	155	Junior	Sanford, FL	Signed with Orlando City B
Jeremy Kelly	29	MF	5'10"	155	Senior	Chapel Hill, NC	Declared for 2020 MLS SuperDraft; selected 9th overall by Montreal Impact

=== Recruiting class ===
Name	Nat.	Hometown	Club	TDS Rating
Axel Alejandre; DF	USA	Chicago, IL	FC United (IL)	4/5 stars
Yaya Bakayoko; FW	USA	Bronx, NY	Manhattan SC	3/5 stars
Sammed Bawa; MF	USA	Hawthorn Woods, IL	Taft School	3/5 stars
Jameson Charles; MF	USA	Minneapolis, MN	Washburn	3/5 stars
Akeim Clarke; MF	USA	Windsor, CT	Black Rock FC	3/5 stars
Garrett Kessel; MF	USA	Oak Ridge, NC	North Carolina Fusion	3/5 stars
Jonathan Sinclair; MF	USA	Valley Stream, NY	F.A Euro	3/5 stars
Riley Thomas; DF	USA	Atlanta, GA	United Futbol Academy (GA)	3/5 stars

== Squad ==
=== Roster ===
Updated December 10, 2020

Note: Flags indicate national team as defined under FIFA eligibility rules; some limited exceptions apply. Players may hold more than one non-FIFA nationality.

No.	Pos.	Nation	Player
1	GK	USA	Alec Smir
2	MF	ITA	Filippo Zattarin
4	DF	ENG	Joe Pickering
5	DF	USA	Julian Hinojosa
6	DF	USA	Matt Constant
7	FW	USA	Lucas Del Rosario
8	MF	USA	Jameson Charles
9	MF	VEN	Santiago Herrera
10	FW	USA	Giovanni Montesdeoca
11	MF	USA	Antonio Lopez
12	GK	USA	J.P. Philpot
13	FW	USA	Key White
14	MF	SWE	Victor Olofsson
15	DF	USA	Riley Thomas
16	FW	USA	Jonathan Jimenez
17	MF	USA	Cameron Fisher
18	MF	WAL	Sam Jones
19	MF	USA	Jonathan Sinclari

No.	Pos.	Nation	Player
20	MF	USA	Ernest Bawa
21	FW	USA	Alex Rose
22	MF	USA	Milo Garvanian
24	GK	SUI	Marco Saborio-Perez
25	FW	USA	Akeim Clarke
26	FW	USA	Axel Alejandre
27	DF	USA	Mark Salas
28	MF	GER	Tim Schels
29	MF	USA	Yaya Bakayoko
30	GK	USA	Jake Schick
31	FW	CAN	Malik Henry
32	DF	USA	Aldair Sanchez
33	MF	USA	Garrett Kessel
34	MF	USA	Ahmad Al-Qaq
35	MF	USA	Sam Moore
37	MF	USA	Jacques Bouvery
38	MF	USA	Roman Knox
39	FW	ENG	Taff Wadda

=== Team management ===
Position	Staff
Athletic Director	Bubba Cunningham
Head coach	Carlos Somoano
Assistant Coach	Grant Porter
Assistant Coach	Will Clayton
Volunteer Assistant Coach	Michael Harrington
Director of Operations	Tim Kübel

== Schedule ==
Date Time, TV	Rank^{#}	Opponent^{#}	Result	Record	Site (Attendance) City, State
Fall Exhibition
September 20, 2020*; 6:00 p.m.		NC State	W 1–0	–	Dorrance Field; Chapel Hill, NC
Fall Regular season
October 2, 2020; 7:00 p.m., ACCNX		at Duke; Rivalry	W 2–0	1–0–0 (1–0–0)	Koskinen Stadium; Durham, NC
October 9, 2020; 6:00 p.m., ESPNU		No. 3 Clemson	W 1–0	2–0–0 (2–0–0)	Dorrance Field; Chapel Hill, NC
October 18, 2020; 6:00 p.m., ACCNX	No. 3	at No. 1 Wake Forest; Rivalry	L 0–1 ^{OT}	2–1–0 (2–1–0)	Spry Stadium; Winston–Salem, NC
October 27, 2020; 7:00 p.m., ACCN	No. 5	at No. 3 Clemson	T 3–3 ^{2OT}	2–1–1 (2–1–1)	Riggs Field (1,000); Clemson, SC
November 1, 2020; 1:00 p.m., ACCNX	No. 5	NC State	T 0–0 ^{2OT}	2–1–2 (2–1–2)	Dorrance Field; Chapel Hill, NC
November 6, 2020; 8:00 p.m., ACCN	No. 4	Duke; Rivalry	W 2–0	3–1–2 (3–1–2)	Dorrance Field (0); Chapel Hill, NC
ACC Tournament
November 15, 2020; 2:00 p.m., ACCN	(S2) No. 3	(N3) Notre Dame; Quarterfinals	L 0–1 ^{OT}	3–2–2	Dorrance Field (0); Chapel Hill, NC
Spring Exhibition
February 20, 2021*; 4:00 p.m.		vs. Clemson	W 1–0	–	CSA OrthoCarolina Sportsplex (0); Pineville, NC
Spring Regular Season
February 25, 2021*; 6:00 p.m., ACCNX		Liberty	L 0–1	3–3–2	Dorrance Field (0); Chapel Hill, NC
March 5, 2021; 7:00 p.m., ACCNX		No. 4 Pittsburgh	W 3–0	4–3–2 (4–1–2)	Dorrance Field (351); Chapel Hill, NC
March 13, 2021; 7:00 p.m., ACCNX		No. 24 Virginia	W 2–0	5–3–2 (5–1–2)	Dorrance Field (580); Chapel Hill, NC
March 20, 2021; 2:00 p.m., ACCNX	No. 15	at Syracuse	T 0–0 ^{2OT}	5–3–3 (5–1–3)	SU Soccer Stadium (0); Syracuse, NY
March 27, 2021; 7:00 p.m., ACCNX	No. 16	at Notre Dame	W 2–1 ^{OT}	6–3–3 (6–1–3)	Alumni Stadium (143); Notre Dame, IN
April 2, 2021; 7:00 p.m., ACCNX	No. 15	Virginia Tech	L 0–1	6–4–3 (6–2–3)	Dorrance Field (423); Chapel Hill, NC
April 11, 2021; 7:00 p.m., ACCNX	No. 18	at Duke; Rivalry	W 1–0	7–4–3 (7–2–3)	Koskinen Stadium (0); Durham, NC
NCAA Tournament
May 2, 2021; 5:00 p.m., NCAA Livestream	No. 16	No. 14 Charlotte; Second Round	T 1–1 (4–1 PKs) ^{2OT}	7–4–4	WakeMed Soccer Park (175); Cary, NC
May 6, 2021; 6:00 p.m., NCAA Livestream	No. 16	(4) No. 5 Stanford; Third Round	W 1–0	8–4–4	WakeMed Soccer Park (185); Cary, NC
May 10, 2021; 5:00 p.m., NCAA Livestream	No. 16	(5) No. 4 Wake Forest; Quarterfinals	W 2–1	9–4–4	WakeMed Soccer Park (189); Cary, NC
May 14, 2021; 6:00 p.m., ESPNU	No. 16	No. 10 Marshall; Semifinals	L 0–1	9–5–4	WakeMed Soccer Park; Cary, NC
*Non-conference game. ^{#}Rankings from United Soccer Coaches. (#) Tournament seedings in parentheses.

== Awards and honors ==
Recipient	Award	Date	Ref.
Alec Smir	ACC Defensive Player of the Week	October 5, 2020	
Fillipo Zattarin	Co-ACC Defensive Player of the Week	October 12, 2020	
Giovanni Montesdeoca	ACC Offensive Player of the Week	March 9, 2021	
Giovanni Montesdeoca	ACC Offensive Player of the Week	March 15, 2021	
Alec Smir	All ACC Second-Team	April 14, 2021	
Giovanni Montesdeoca	All ACC Second-Team	April 14, 2021	

== 2021 MLS Super Draft ==
Player	Team	Round	Pick #	Position
Matt Constant	Sporting Kansas City	2	50	DF
Mark Salas	FC Dallas	3	76	DF
Giovanni Montesdeoca	FC Dallas	3	79	FW

== Rankings ==
=== Fall 2020 ===
Ranking movement Legend: ██ Improvement in ranking. ██ Decrease in ranking. ██ Not ranked the previous week. RV=Others receiving votes.
Poll	Wk 1	Wk 2	Wk 3	Wk 4	Wk 5	Wk 6	Wk 7	Wk 8	Wk 9	Final
United Soccer				3	5	5	4	3	4	

=== Spring 2021 ===
Ranking movement Legend: ██ Improvement in ranking. ██ Decrease in ranking. ██ Not ranked the previous week. RV=Others receiving votes.
Poll	Pre	Wk 1	Wk 2	Wk 3	Wk 4	Wk 5	Wk 6	Wk 7	Wk 8	Wk 9	Wk 10	Wk 11	Wk 12	Wk 13	Final
United Soccer	None Released					RV	15	16	15	18	15	16	None Released		4
TopDrawer Soccer	14	13	13	14					RV				16	8	4
