= Journal of Advertising =

- Discipline: Advertising
- Language: English
- Edited by: Shelly Rodgers

Publication details
- History: 1972-present
- Publisher: Routledge Taylor & Francis on behalf of the American Academy of Advertising (United States)
- Frequency: 5 Times Per Year
- Impact factor: 6.302 (2019)

Standard abbreviations
- ISO 4: J. Advert.

Indexing
- ISSN: 0091-3367 (print); 1557-7805 (web)
- JSTOR: 00913367

Links
- Journal homepage; Online access

The Journal of Advertising is published fives times per year and is a peer-reviewed academic journal covering advertising theories and their relationship with practice. It is owned by the American Academy of Advertising and published on their behalf by Routledge Taylor & Francis.

== Abstracting and indexing ==
The journal is abstracted and indexed in Communication Abstracts, Current Contents/Social and Behavioral Sciences, Emerald Management Reviews, International Bibliography of the Social Sciences, PsycINFO, ProQuest, Scopus, and Social Sciences Citation Index. According to the Journal Citation Reports, the Journal has a 2019 impact factor of 6.302.

== Editors ==
The following persons have been editors-in-chief of the journal:

- Shelly Rodgers (current)
- Shintaro Okazaki
- Wei-Na Lee
- Marla Royne
- Russell Laczniak
- Ronald Faber
- Les Carlson
- George Zinkhan
- Len Reid
- Anthony McGann
- H. Keith Hunt
- Thomas Russell
- Daniel Stewart

As of January 2020, the editor-in-chief is Shelly Rodgers (University of Missouri)
