= George Zinkhan =

American poet

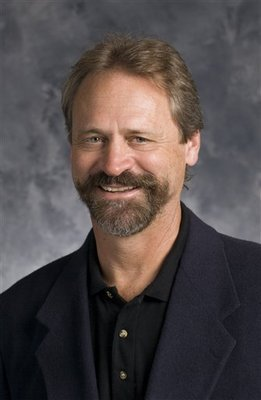
- George Zinkhan in August 2006
- Born: February 17, 1952; Baltimore, Maryland
- Died: April/May 2009 (aged 57); Clarke County, Georgia
- Cause of death: Suicide
- Citizenship: American
- Education: Swarthmore College; University of Michigan
- Scientific career
- Fields: Marketing
- Workplaces: University of Houston; University of Pittsburgh; University of Georgia; Vrije Universiteit

George Martin Zinkhan III (February 17, 1952 – c. May 9, 2009) was an American academic and poet. Zinkhan was a professor of marketing at the University of Georgia from 1994 until April 26, 2009. He was named as the prime suspect in a triple homicide before authorities announced on May 9, 2009, that they had found and identified Zinkhan's body.

== Career ==
In 1974, Zinkhan received his Bachelor of Arts in English literature from Swarthmore College. He earned a Master's in Business Administration with high distinction from the University of Michigan in 1979 and his doctorate in business administration, also from the University of Michigan, in 1981.

Zinkhan was the Conn Professor of Marketing for thirteen years at the University of Houston beginning in 1981. While there, he sexually harassed multiple female academics and ultimately had a lawsuit brought against him. For one year he also was an associate professor for the University of Pittsburgh in 1987. He began as a professor at the University of Georgia's Terry College of Business in 1994 and served as department head for Terry's Department of Marketing and Distribution from 1994 until 2001. He held an endowed chair as the department's Coca-Cola Company Professor from 1994 to 2009. According to a university spokesman, he had an impeccable track record as a teacher and was a respected professor on campus.

== Awards ==
Zinkhan received an award for Outstanding Contribution to Research in 2004 which was presented by the American Academy of Advertising. He also received the Terry Outstanding Faculty Award 2006 and 2009 presented by the economics faculty of the Vrije Universiteit.

== Publications ==
Zinkhan published over 100 articles in peer-reviewed academic journals, as well as numerous chapters in edited books. He was the editor of the Journal of the Academy of Marketing Science from 2003 to 2006, and of the Journal of Advertising from 1991 to 1995, as well as the book review editor of the Journal of Marketing from 1991 to 1995. In addition, he edited or co-edited several books:

- Arnould, Eric; Linda Price; George Zinkhan (2004). Consumers. McGraw Hill / Irwin. ISBN 0-07-253714-0.
- Watson, Richard; Pierre Berthon; Leyland F. Pitt; George Zinkhan (2000). Electronic Commerce: The Strategic Perspective. Thompson / Dryden. 162 pages. ISBN 0-03-026533-9.
- Zinkhan, George M. (2000). Advertising research: the Internet, consumer behavior, and strategy. Chicago, Ill: American Marketing Association. ISBN 0-87757-288-7.

Zinkhan's curriculum vitae listed 22 works under a section called, "Research Activities: Poetry". Zinkhan's poems—many of which the American Marketing Association published on its website—cover topics ranging from university politics to the Appalachian Trail.

== Personal life ==
Zinkhan had two children, a son and a daughter, with his wife, attorney Marie Bruce. Zinkhan also had three children from a previous marriage. The family lived in the town of Bogart, which is adjacent to Athens. Zinkhan owned a second home in Amsterdam, where he was a marketing professor at the Vrije Universiteit.

== Murder charges ==
Zinkhan was named the prime suspect in the April 25, 2009, shooting deaths of his wife and two other people, Tom Tanner and Ben Teague, outside the Athens Community Theatre in Athens, Georgia. The murders occurred during a picnic reunion of the Town & Gown Players, and all three killed were active in local theater productions. Two bystanders were injured by bullet fragments. According to neighbors and colleagues, there had been no advance signs of trouble. Police said Zinkhan and his wife, Marie Bruce, were having “marital difficulties,” that Tom Tanner appeared to be his “specific target” in the shootings, and that Ben Teague was “at the wrong place at the wrong time.” Tanner was shot first, police said. On the same day, "Zinkhan was charged with three counts of murder and a state arrest warrant was issued in Clarke County, Georgia. A federal arrest warrant was issued on April 26, 2009, after he was charged with unlawful flight to avoid prosecution."

== Death ==
Zinkhan's red Jeep Liberty was found on the night of April 30, 2009, in northwest Clarke County, Georgia, which is coextensive with Athens. Cadaver dogs located Zinkhan's body on May 9, 2009, approximately one mile from the Jeep. Investigators said that Zinkhan used a shovel to dig a 15-to-18-inch-deep (380 to 460 mm) grave in the woods behind Cleveland Road Elementary, lay down in it, took an old wooden pallet he had covered with dirt and debris and pulled it over top of the hole. He then fired a single shot from a .38-caliber handgun into his head.

Zinkhan's body was claimed by a son from a previous marriage one day before it was scheduled for burial in a pauper's grave.
