= Kristo Strickler =

American soccer player

Personal information
- Full name: Kristofer Montero Strickler
- Date of birth: September 5, 1998 (age 28)
- Place of birth: Columbus, Ohio, United States
- Height: 5 ft 10 in (1.78 m)
- Position: Forward

Youth career
- 2013–2017: Blast FC

College career
Years	Team	Apps	(Gls)
2017–2020	Virginia Tech Hokies	74	(28)

Senior career*
Years	Team	Apps	(Gls)
2019	Dayton Dutch Lions	5	(1)
2021	South Georgia Tormenta	15	(0)
- * Club domestic league appearances and goals as of November 2, 2021

Kristofer Montero Strickler (born September 5, 1998) is an American professional soccer player who plays as a forward.

== Career ==
=== Youth ===
Strickler spent four years playing club soccer with local side Blast FC between 2013 and 2017, as well as playing in high school with Saint Charles Preparatory School.

=== College and amateur ===
In 2017, Strickler began playing college soccer at Virginia Tech. Over four seasons with the Hokies, Strickler made 74 appearances, scoring 28 goals and tallying 10 assists. He also earned honors including; First team All-ACC in 2020, First team VaSID in 2018 and 2020, and Second team All-ACC in 2018 and 2019.

During the 2019 season, Strickler also appeared in the USL League Two for Dayton Dutch Lions, scoring a goal and tallying a single assist in 5 appearances.

=== MLS SuperDraft ===
On January 21, 2021, Strickler was selected 30th overall in the 2021 MLS SuperDraft by Houston Dynamo. However, he was not signed by the club.

=== South Georgia Tormenta ===
On June 12, 2021, it was announced Strickler had signed for USL League One side South Georgia Tormenta. He made his professional debut the following day, appearing as a 70th-minute substitute during a 1–0 win over Toronto FC II.

== International ==
In March 2019, Strickler traveled to Bangkok, Thailand to train and attempt to earn a spot in the Philippines national football team. However, to date has not earned a cap for the national team level.

== Personal ==
Strickler is half-Filipino on his mother's side.
