= Luis Felipe Fernandez-Salvador =

Ecuadorian footballer (born 2000)

Personal information
- Full name: Luis Felipe Fernández-Salvador Boloña
- Date of birth: February 28, 2000 (age 26)
- Place of birth: Guayaquil, Ecuador
- Height: 1.78 m (5 ft 10 in)
- Position: Midfielder

Youth career
- 2012–2016: Emelec
- 2016–2018: Shattuck-Saint Mary's

College career
Years	Team	Apps	(Gls)
2018–2021	Clemson Tigers	69	(11)

Senior career*
Years	Team	Apps	(Gls)
2022	Whitecaps FC 2	17	(3)
2023–2024	Deportivo Cuenca	3	(0)
- * Club domestic league appearances and goals as of 16:18, 25 April 2025 (UTC)

Luis Felipe Fernández-Salvador Boloña (born 28 February 2000), also known as Pípé, is an Ecuadorian footballer who plays as a midfielder.

== Career ==
=== Youth ===
Fernández-Salvador was born in Guayaquil, Ecuador, but moved to the United States when he was five years old. At age 12 he returned to Ecuador, where he stayed for four years and was part of the Emelec academy from 12 to 16 year's old. However, at the age of 16 he returned to North America, where he attended the Shattuck-Saint Mary's academy.

=== College ===
In 2018, Fernández-Salvador attended Clemson University, where he went on to make 69 appearances for the Tigers, scoring eleven goals and tallying 14 assists. In 2020, he was named third-team All-ACC, and in 2021 was on the NCAA College Cup All-Tournament Team as he helped the team to the NCAA national championship.

=== Professional ===
On 11 January 2022, Fernández-Salvador was selected 44th overall in the 2022 MLS SuperDraft by Vancouver Whitecaps FC. On 18 March 2022, he signed a professional contract with club's MLS Next Pro side Whitecaps FC 2 ahead of the league's inaugural season. He went on to make 17 appearances for the team during the 2022 season, scoring three goals.
