= NC State Wolfpack men's soccer =

American college soccer team

- Founded: 1950; 76 years ago
- University: North Carolina State University
- Head coach: Marc Hubbard (2nd season)
- Conference: ACC
- Location: Raleigh, North Carolina, US
- Stadium: Dail Soccer Field (capacity: 3,000)
- Nickname: The Pack
- Colors: Red and white
Home	Away

NCAA tournament runner-up
- 2025

NCAA tournament College Cup
- 1990, 2025

NCAA tournament Quarterfinals
- 1990, 1991, 1992, 2025

NCAA tournament Round of 16
- 1986, 1990, 1991, 1992, 1994, 2024, 2025

NCAA tournament appearances
- 1981, 1983, 1984, 1985, 1986, 1987, 1990, 1991, 1992, 1994, 2003, 2005, 2009, 2017, 2018, 2019, 2024, 2025

Conference tournament championships
- 1990

Conference regular season championships
- 1994

The NC State Wolfpack men's soccer team is a varsity intercollegiate athletic team of North Carolina State University in Raleigh, North Carolina, United States. The team is a member of the Atlantic Coast Conference, which is part of the National Collegiate Athletic Association's Division I. NC State's first men's soccer team was fielded in 1950. The team plays its home games at Dail Soccer Stadium in Raleigh. The Pack is coached by Marc Hubbard.

The Wolfpack had much of their success in the mid-1980s to the mid-1990s, where over the span of 10 seasons, the Pack appeared in eight NCAA Tournaments. During this time, the Wolfpack won, to date, their only ACC Men's Soccer Tournament title, coming in 1990, as well as their only ACC Regular Season title, coming in 1994. Since then, the Wolfpack have made the NCAA Tournament on three occasions, qualifying in the 2003, 2005 and 2009 editions of the tournament. Additionally, in 1990, the team had their deepest run in the NCAA Tournament, reaching their first College Cup in program history.

== Roster ==
As of 24 Aug 2026

Note: Flags indicate national team as defined under FIFA eligibility rules; some limited exceptions apply. Players may hold more than one non-FIFA nationality.

No.	Pos.	Nation	Player
1	GK	USA	Samuel Terranova
2	DF	CAN	Josh Gordon
3	DF	ENG	Riley Moloney
4	DF	USA	Nakai Antoine
5	DF	ESP	Oriol Comas
6	MF	FRA	Abdou-Magib So
7	FW	ENG	Russell Berko
8	MF	USA	Drew Lovelace
9	FW	ENG	Tom Wingate
10	MF	BER	Ajani Burchall
11	FW	USA	Frank DeFrancesco
12	MF	ENG	Tyler Caton
13	FW	USA	Austin Bush
14	MF	MEX	Erik Peña
15	FW	USA	Aidan Payne
16	DF	GHA	Lawson Abass
17	MF	USA	Caden Tolentino

No.	Pos.	Nation	Player
18	FW	USA	Cameron Letterlough
19	MF	USA	Ervin Cruz
20	MF	JPN	Hayato Takayama
21	DF	USA	Adam Abdouh
22	DF	ESP	Adrià Muñoz
23	DF	FRA	Malcolm Rangon
24	MF	ENG	Mikell Barnes
25	DF	USA	Brandon Bent
26	GK	USA	Jackson Smith
27	DF	GER	Emanuel Adou
28	MF	USA	Brendan Peeples
29	MF	USA	Jake Cooley
30	GK	BRA	Matheus Rhormens
31	MF	USA	John Pottle
32	DF	USA	Gianni Rosario
34	GK	USA	Gabe Lamphere

== Rivalries ==
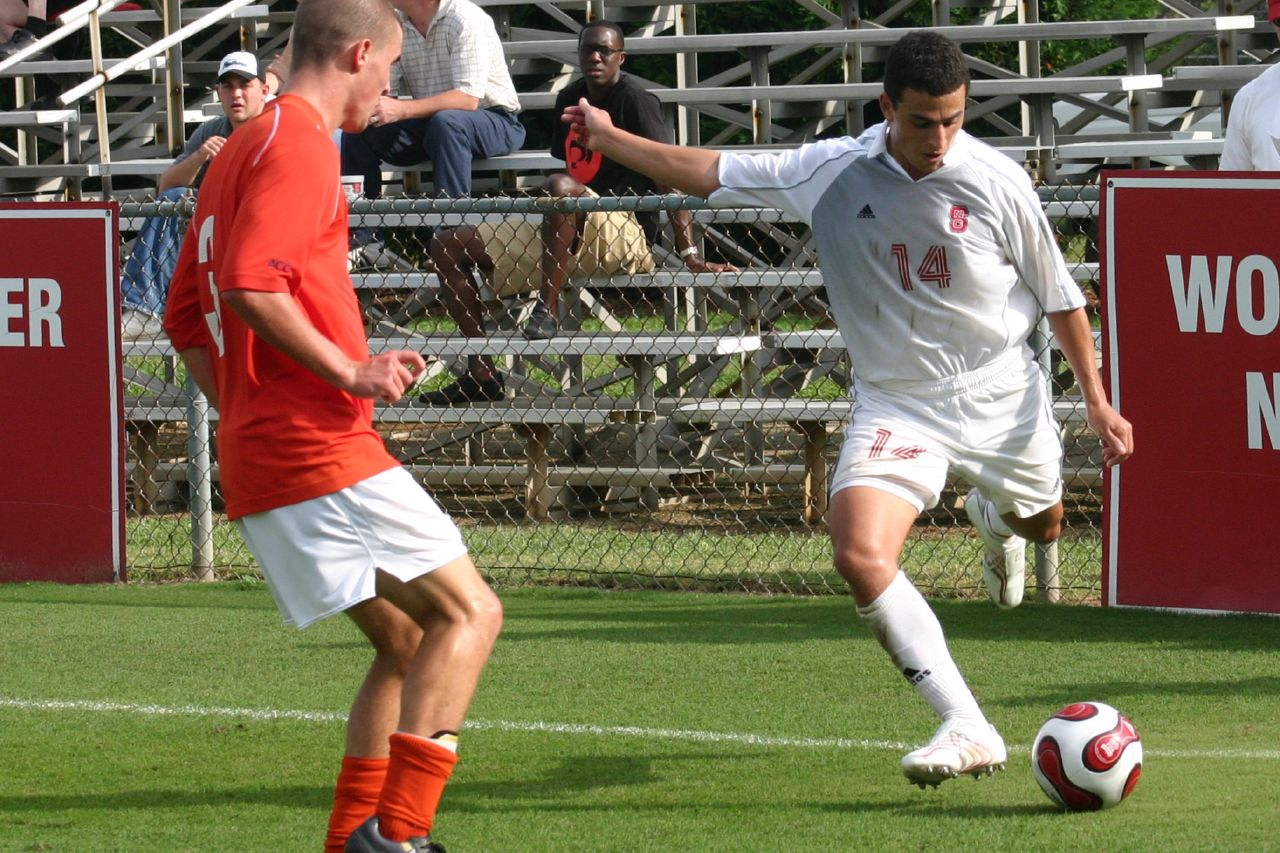
NC State v Clemson match in 2006

Much of NC State's rivalries are also rivalries across other collegiate sports. The Wolfpack's primary rival, is the North Carolina Tar Heels, who they contest annually in ACC play. Matches against other in-state ACC opponents, such as Duke and Wake Forest are known as Tobacco Road, due to the state' longstanding history of tobacco production.

== Coaching history ==
There have been ten head coaches in the program's history.

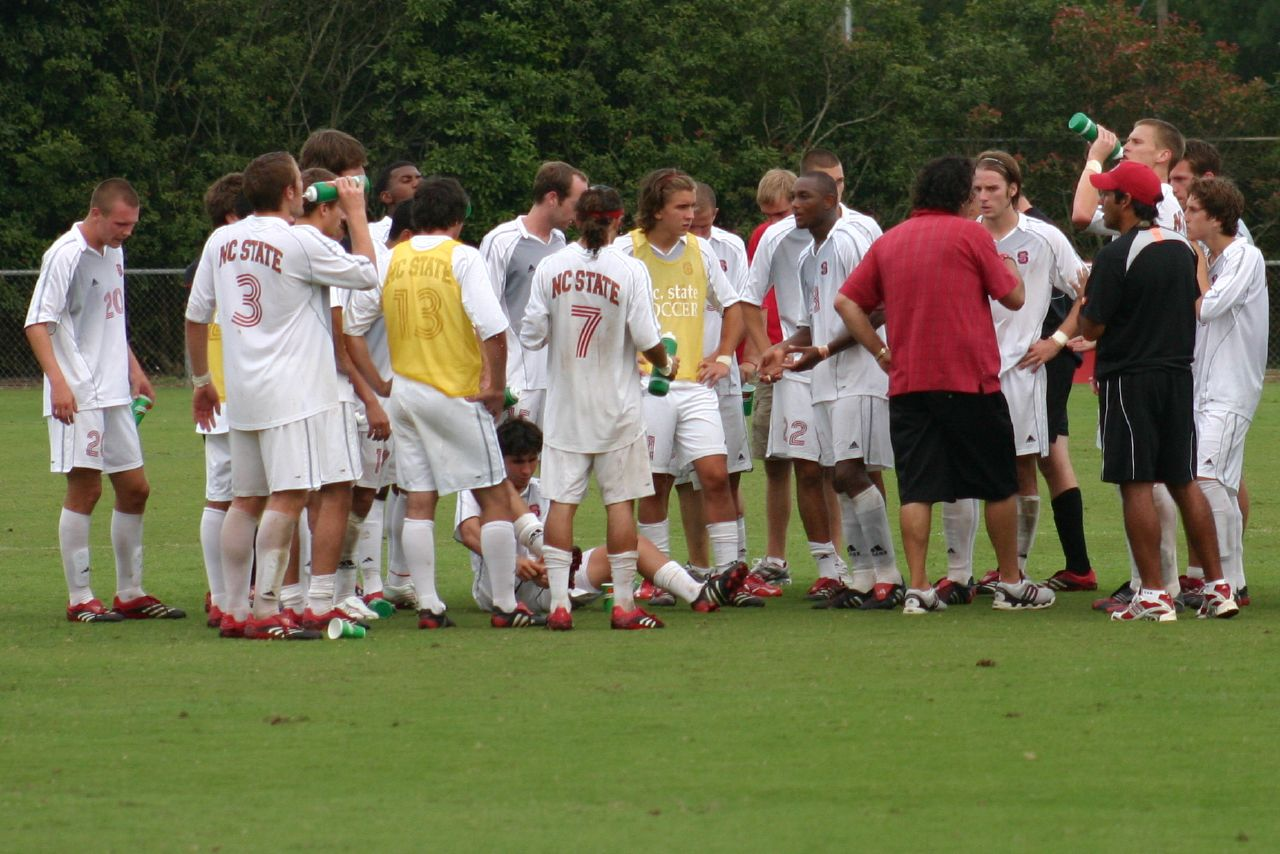
NC State players and coaching staff during a match in 2006

Years	Coach	GP	W	L	T	Pct.
1950–1955	Eric DeGroat	56	17	29	10	.393
1956	John Kenfield	8	1	7	0	.125
1957–1960	Bill Leonhardt	36	11	23	2	.333
1961–1963	Nellie Cooper	33	10	22	1	.318
1964–1977	Max Rhodes	157	77	69	11	.526
1978–1985	Larry Gross	152	106	37	9	.727
1986–2010	George Tarantini	474	234	197	43	.539
2011–2016	Kelly Findley	109	45	51	13	.473
2017–2023	George Kiefer	125	49	52	24	.488
2024–	Marc Hubbard	20	10	5	5	.625

== Individual achievements ==
=== All-Americans ===
NC State has produced 12 All-Americans. The most recent was Aaron King, who won the honor in 2005.

Player	Position	Year(s)
Kare Kragas	FW	1951
Benito Artinano	FW	1962, 1963
Eddie Link	MF	1967
Chris Ogu	MF	1982, 1983
Sam Okpodu	FW	1982, 1983, 1984
Tab Ramos	MF	1985, 1986, 1987
Dario Brose	MF	1988, 1990
Henry Gutierrez	FW	1988, 1990, 1991
Chris Szanto	DF	1989
Tom Tanner	FW	1990
Scott Schweitzer	DF	1992
Aaron King	FW	2005

== Notable alumni ==
=== Current Professional Players ===
As of March 6, 2025

- (United States) Samuel Okpodu (1981–1984) – Currently head coach with Maryland Bobcats FC
- (United States) Chuck Codd (1985–1989) – Currently assistant coach with Baylor (women)
- (United States) Tom Tanner (1986–1990) – Currently general manager of Utica City FC
- (United States) Damon Nahas (1992–1996) – Currently head coach with North Carolina (women)
- (Cuba) Albertin Montoya (1993–1995) – Currently head coach with Bay FC
- (United States) Pablo Mastroeni (1994–1997) – Currently head coach with Real Salt Lake
- (Trinidad and Tobago) Akil DeFreitas (2009–2010) – Currently with KF
- (Uruguay) Alex Martínez (2012–2013) – Currently assistant coach with D.C. United
- (United States) Danny DiPrima (2011–2013) – Currently assistant coach with Millersville
- (United States) Matías Fracchia (2014–2015) – Currently with Coritiba
- (United States) Ryan Peterson (2014–2015) – Currently with Ocean City Nor'easters
- (United States) Manny Perez (2017–2018) – Currently with Louisville City FC
- (England) Jamie Smith (2019–2021) – Currently with Crown Legacy FC
