= 2020 NCAA Division I men's soccer season =

American college soccer season

- Duration: Fall season: September 17 – November 22, 2020; Spring season: February 3 – May 17, 2021
- Number of teams: ~~207~~ 186 (21 sitting out due to COVID-19)
- Top goalscorer: 15 goals Gloire Amanda (Oregon State)

Statistics
- Biggest home win: Portland 15-0 Multnomah University (03/31/2021)
- Highest scoring: Portland 15-0 Multnomah University (03/31/2021)
- Longest winning run: 4 games Denver (03/18/21–current)
- Longest unbeaten run: 9 games Marshall (7-0-2) (03/11/21–current)
- Longest winless run: 23 games Harvard (0–22–1) (10/02/2018-current)
- Longest losing run: 13 games Canisius (10/12/19-current)
- Highest attendance: 5,000 – NCAA Title Game, Cary, NC 05/18/21
- Lowest attendance: 0 (multiple closed door games)

Tournament
- Duration: April 30 to May 17, 2021

College Cup
- Date: May 17, 2021
- Site: WakeMed Soccer Park (Cary, NC)
- Champions: Marshall
- Runners-up: Indiana

Seasons
- ← 2019 2021 →

The 2020 NCAA Division I men's soccer season was the 62nd season of NCAA championship men's college soccer. The season was originally slated to begin on August 28, 2020, and conclude on November 15, 2020. The season was to culminate with the 2020 NCAA Division I men's soccer tournament, which was to be held from November 18 to December 13, 2020, with the four-team College Cup at Meredith Field at Harder Stadium in Santa Barbara, California.

On August 13, 2020, the NCAA tournament was suspended due to the ongoing COVID-19 pandemic. Leading up to the postseason tournament suspension, some conferences had planned to play conference-only matches during the fall season, while some conferences opted to postpone the season to Spring 2021 (February to May 2021). Ultimately, the Atlantic Coast Conference and the Sun Belt Conference began play for the 2020 fall season; while a handful of programs scheduled competitive fixtures for the fall 2020 season: Army, Kentucky, Mercer, Navy, South Carolina, and UAB.

On September 16, 2020, the NCAA announced that the spring season would run from February 3 to April 17, 2021, culminating with the NCAA tournament, which was reduced from 48 to 36 teams for this season only. The postponed NCAA tournament began on April 30 and ended on May 17, 2021. The ACC and Sun Belt champions, which were determined in November, earned automatic bids into the tournament. Nevertheless, the fall season began with Notre Dame beating Kentucky, 1–0, on September 17, 2020.

On March 24, 2021, the NCAA announced that the entirety of the men's and women's tournament would be consolidated, with all 36 men's teams and 48 women's teams playing all games in Cary, North Carolina and its vicinity during the period from April 27–May 17.

== Changes from 2019 ==
=== Coaching changes ===
Program	Outgoing coach	Manner of departure	Date of vacancy	Incoming coach	Date of appointment
Central Connecticut	Shaun Green	Retired	December 6, 2019	Dave Kelly (interim)	January 14, 2020
Incarnate Word	Chris Fidler (interim)	Not retained after 2 seasons	November 11, 2019	Kiki Lara	December 20, 2019
George Mason	Greg Andrulis	Resigned	November 13, 2019	Elmar Bolowich	January 13, 2020
Boston U.	Neil Roberts	Retired	November 18, 2019	Kevin Nylen	January 16, 2020
Harvard	Pieter Lehrer	Fired	November 18, 2019	Josh Shapiro	January 13, 2020
UNC Asheville	Mathes Mennell	Resigned	November 19, 2019	Mick Giordano (Interim)	February 7, 2020
Valparaiso	Mike Avery	Program discontinued	November 20, 2019	—N/a	—N/a
Boston College	Ed Kelly	Retired	November 25, 2019	Bob Thompson	January 23, 2020
Kansas City	Rick Benben	Retired	December 2, 2019	Ryan Pore	January 14, 2020
Drexel	Doug Hess	Fired	December 3, 2019	Michael Marchiano	January 31, 2020
San Diego State	Lev Kirshner	Fired	December 6, 2019	Ryan Hopkins	January 21, 2020
West Virginia	Marlon LeBlanc	Resigned	December 12, 2019	Dan Stratford	January 20, 2020
Eastern Illinois	Kiki Lara	Hired by Incarnate Word	December 23, 2019	Ronnie Bouemboue	February 5, 2020
Purdue Fort Wayne	Mike Harper	Resigned	January 13, 2020	Stephen Gorton	February 14, 2020
FIU	Kevin Nylen	Hired by Boston U.	January 16, 2020	Kyle Russell	February 21, 2020
Stetson	Cristian Neagu	Fired	February 10, 2020	Emmett Rutkowski	February 26, 2020
VMI	Charlie Hubbard	Hired by James Madison (asst.)	March 5, 2020	Max Watson	March 23, 2020
Cincinnati	Hylton Dayes	Resigned, program discontinued	March 13, 2020	—N/a	—N/a
Appalachian State	Jason O'Keefe	Program discontinued	May 26, 2020	—N/a	—N/a
Chicago State	—N/a	—N/a	New program	Trevor Banks	July 20, 2020
Robert Morris	Bill Denniston	Retired	September 1, 2020	Jason O'Keefe	November 24, 2020
UTRGV	Paul Leese	Not retained	October 18, 2020	Bryheem Hancock	November 24, 2020
Radford	Bryheem Hancock	Hired by UTRGV	November 24, 2020	Chris Barrett,	February 2, 2021

=== New programs ===
On November 27, 2017, it was announced that, in 2020, the Tritons of the University of California, San Diego, located in the San Diego, California district of La Jolla, would begin the transition from Division II to Division I as a member of the Big West Conference.

On January 11, 2019, it was announced that the Trailblazers of Dixie State University, now known as Utah Tech University, of St. George, Utah would begin the transition from Division II to Division I as a member of the Western Athletic Conference (WAC).

On June 17, 2019, it was announced that the Knights of Bellarmine University of Louisville, Kentucky would begin the transition from Division II to Division I as a member of the ASUN Conference.

Chicago State University announced on June 23, 2020, that it would begin men's soccer effective immediately. The school had first committed to adding the sport when joining the Western Athletic Conference in 2014, and it budgeted for a team in 2016, but the school did not then begin play due to financial challenges and seriously discussed leaving Division I. The decision to finally add men's soccer came at the same time the school dropped baseball due to fallout from the COVID-19 pandemic. The Cougars will play in their full-time home of the WAC but will not begin conference play until 2021.

On July 15, 2020, after months of consideration, the NCAA granted the highly unusual request of the University of St. Thomas to move directly from Division III to Division I. The school had already accepted an invitation to join the Summit League, and the Tommies will enter Division I and Summit League competition in 2021.

=== Discontinued programs ===
On November 20, 2019, Valparaiso announced that the men's soccer and tennis teams would be eliminated to allow greater attention to the school's other sports teams.

On April 14, 2020, Cincinnati announced that, due to uncertainty surrounding the COVID-19 pandemic, the men's soccer program would be discontinued effective immediately.

On May 26, 2020, Appalachian State, a Division I men's soccer power in the late 1970s, cut the men's soccer program and two other men's programs in response to the financial impact of COVID-19.

=== Conference realignment ===
School	Previous Conference	New Conference
Cal State Bakersfield	Western Athletic Conference (WAC)	Big West Conference
UC San Diego	California Collegiate Athletic Association (CCAA) (Division II)	Big West Conference
Dixie State	Rocky Mountain Athletic Conference (RMAC) (Division II)	Western Athletic Conference (WAC)
Kansas City	Western Athletic Conference (WAC)	Summit League
Bellarmine	Great Lakes Valley Conference (GLVC) (Division II)	ASUN Conference
UConn	American Athletic Conference	Big East Conference
Purdue Fort Wayne	Summit League	Horizon League
Valparaiso	Missouri Valley Conference (MVC)	Program discontinued (MVC now has only 5 teams)
Cincinnati	American Athletic Conference	Program discontinued
Appalachian State	Sun Belt Conference	Program discontinued (Sun Belt now has only 5 teams)
NJIT	ASUN Conference	America East Conference
Robert Morris	Northeast Conference	Horizon League
Chicago State	No team	Western Athletic Conference (played as independent in 2020)

=== Other changes ===
In June 2020, the Missouri Valley Conference and SIU Edwardsville jointly announced that SIUE men's soccer would leave the Mid-American Conference and return to the MVC effective with the 2021 season. While restoring the MVC to six teams, the move then reduced the MAC to only five teams.

The Sun Belt Conference had begun the 2020–21 school year with five men's soccer members, but by the start of the spring 2021 season, two were confirmed to be departing that July for conferences that sponsor men's soccer. On July 6, 2020, Howard announced that it would become an associate member of the Northeast Conference (NEC) in six sports no later than July 2021. Two sports joined the NEC for the 2020–21 school year, while the remaining four, including men's soccer, will join in July 2021. Then, on January 29, 2021, the ASUN Conference officially announced three schools as incoming full members, including Sun Belt men's soccer associate member Central Arkansas. With the Sun Belt men's soccer league by that time all but certain to disband after the 2020–21 school year, Conference USA (C-USA) and Coastal Carolina jointly announced on February 25 that the Chanticleers would become men's soccer members of the league effective with the fall 2021 season. The end of Sun Belt men's soccer was confirmed on May 21 when the Mid-American Conference announced that the last two Sun Belt men's soccer members, Georgia Southern and Georgia State, would join the MAC for the fall 2021 season. This move also restored the MAC men's soccer league to seven teams.

== Season outlook ==
=== Preseason polls ===
NOTE: College Soccer News released its pre-season poll before the NCAA moved the season to the Spring semester. The ACC and the Sun Belt and some other teams played son Fall games, and the Ivy League cancelled its season. Before the Spring season got underway, College Soccer News conducted a new poll and published a new Top 30. The new poll is to the right of the older one.

United Soccer Coaches
Rank	Team
1	
2	
3	
4	
5	
6	
7	
8	
9	
10	
11	
12	
13	
14	
15	
16	
17	
18	
19	
20	
21	
22	
23	
24	
25	

College Soccer News
Rank	Team
1	Georgetown
2	Stanford
3	Clemson
4	Wake Forest
5	SMU
6	Indiana
7	Virginia
8	UCF
9	Washington
10	Missouri State
11	UCSB
12	Maryland
13	Michigan
14	Virginia Tech
15	Marshall
16	Seattle U
17	St. John's
18	Louisville
19	Campbell
20	Penn State
21	Kentucky
22	Charlotte
23	UC Davis
24	Boston College
25	Yale
26	NC State
27	North Carolina
28	Pitt
29	California
30	Akron

College Soccer News
Rank	Team
1	Georgetown
2	Stanford
3	Clemson
4	Wake Forest
5	SMU
6	Indiana
7	UCF
8	Washington
9	Pitt
10	Missouri State
11	Virginia Tech
12	Maryland
13	Michigan
14	Marshall
15	Seattle U
16	Notre Dane
17	St. John's
18	North Carolina
19	Kentucky
20	Campbell
21	Penn State
22	Charlotte
23	Coastal Carolina
24	Boston College
25	California
26	Akron
27	Loyola Marymount
28	James Madison
29	Virginia
30	NJIT

Top Drawer Soccer
Rank	Team
1	Georgetown
2	Clemson
3	Pittsburgh
4	Stanford
5	Wake Forest
6	Akron
7	Indiana
8	SMU
9	Marshall
10	UCF
11	Virginia Tech
12	Notre Dane
13	Kentucky
14	North Carolina
15	Loyola Marymount
16	Washington
17	Saint Mary's
18	James Madison
19	Charlotte
20	Coastal Carolina
21	Maryland
22	Portland
23	Penn State
24	St. John's
25	Florida International

Soccer America
Rank	Team
1	
2	
3	
4	
5	
6	
7	
8	
9	
10	
11	
12	
13	
14	
15	
16	
17	
18	
19	
20	
21	
22	
23	
24	
25	

=== Impact of COVID-19 on season ===
For the 2020 season, several changes in how the season began, and how conference play was organized affected the 2020 season.

- The Atlantic 10 Men's Soccer Tournament, for the 2020 season only, will be reduced from eight teams to four, to minimize travel and contamination.
- The Big East Conference divided into two divisions, the "East" and "Midwest" divisions to minimize travel and to regionalize conference play.
- The Big South Conference Men's Soccer Tournament, for the 2020 season only, will be reduced from six teams to four, to minimize travel and contamination.
- The Metro Atlantic Athletic Conference announced that the men's soccer season will begin on September 11, rather than August 28.
- The Mid-American Conference discontinued its men's soccer tournament. All teams will play each other home-and-home.
- The Southern Conference Men's Soccer Tournament, for the 2020 season only, will be reduced from six teams to four, to minimize travel and contamination.
- On July 8, the Ivy League cancelled all intercollegiate sports for the 2020 Fall semester; this includes both men's and women's soccer.
- On July 10, the Big Ten and Pac-12 Conferences announced all teams will play the 2020 season with conference-only matches
- On July 13, the Patriot League announced that all fall sports, including men's soccer would be cancelled.
- On July 17, the Atlantic 10 Conference announced that all fall sports, including men's soccer, would be postponed to spring 2021.
- On August 13, the Western Athletic Conference announced that all fall sports, including men's soccer, would be postponed to spring 2021. However, the league is allowing non-conference games.
- On August 13, the Southern Conference announced that conference competition in all fall sports, including men's soccer, would be suspended through the end of the calendar year.
- On August 14, the ASUN Conference announced that all fall sports, including men's soccer, would be postponed with the intent to hold them in the spring 2021.
- On August 15, the NCAA suspended the men's soccer championship for the fall season, with the possibility of being played in winter or spring 2021
- On August 27, three conferences confirmed to play in the fall, with individual programs allowed to play games in the fall. The ACC and the Sun Belt played in fall 2020.
- On October 15, the ASUN announced that it would split into North and South Divisions for the spring 2021 season only. Conference standings, and with them seeding in the conference tournament, were based exclusively on results within each division.

== Fall 2020 season ==
=== Standings ===
2020 ACC men's fall soccer standings
	Conf.					Overall
Team	W		L		T	W		L		T
North
No. 2 Pittsburgh	4	–	0	–	0	7	–	1	–	0
No. 4 Virginia Tech	3	–	1	–	2	3	–	2	–	2
Notre Dame	3	–	2	–	0	5	–	4	–	0
Virginia	2	–	3	–	1	3	–	4	–	1
Louisville	1	–	4	–	1	1	–	6	–	1
Syracuse	0	–	3	–	2	0	–	3	–	2
South
No. 3 Wake Forest	5	–	1	–	0	7	–	2	–	0
North Carolina	3	–	1	–	2	3	–	2	–	2
No. 1 Clemson‡	3	–	2	–	1	8	–	2	–	1
Duke	2	–	4	–	0	2	–	6	–	0
NC State	0	–	5	–	1	0	–	6	–	1
Boston College†	0	–	0	–	0	0	–	0	–	0
‡ – 2020 ACC Tournament champion; As of March 9, 2021; Rankings from United Soccer Coaches; Source:The ACC; Note: † Due to COVID-19, Boston College suspended the Fall 2020 men's soccer season; begins play in March.

2020 Sun Belt Conference men's soccer standings
	Conf.					Overall
Team	W		L		T	W		L		T
No. 23 Coastal Carolina ‡	5	–	1	–	0	6	–	2	–	1
Georgia State	4	–	2	–	0	9	–	2	–	2
Central Arkansas	3	–	3	–	0	4	–	6	–	2
Georgia Southern	0	–	6	–	0	1	–	9	–	0
‡ – 2020 Sun Belt Tournament Champion + – Also invited to the 2020 NCAA tournament Note: † Due to COVID-19, Howard has suspended the 2020 men's soccer season.; As of March 2, 2021; Rankings from United Soccer Coaches

=== Rankings ===
==== Top-ranked team ====
Weekly United Soccer Coaches #1 ranked team (Fall 2020)
Date	Team	Date	Team	Date	Team	Date	Team
September 22	Wake Forest	September 29	Wake Forest	October 6	Wake Forest	October 13	Wake Forest
October 20	Pitt	October 27	Pitt	November 3	Pitt	November 10	Pitt
November 17	Pitt	November 24	Clemson	end of fall 2020 season			

=== Top Drawer Soccer Team of the Week ===
- **Bold** denotes TDS player of the week.

Team of the week
Week	Goalkeeper	Defenders	Midfielders	Forwards	Honorable mention
Sep. 22	(United States) McLaughlin (Notre Dame)	(Guinea-Bissau) Soumah (South Carolina) (United States) Mayer (Notre Dame) (England) Henderson (Georgia State) (Italy) Calzola (Central Arkansas)	(Republic of Ireland) McFadden (Notre Dame) (United States) Buete (UAB) (United States) Guest (Georgia State)	(Canada) Martineau (Mercer) (United States) **Briggs** (Georgia State) (United States) Banahan (South Carolina)	(United States) Russo (Notre Dame) (England) Tyson (Georgia State) (United States) Kim (Mercer) (United States) Frost (South Carolina)
Sep. 29	(Spain) Campuzano (Pitt)	(United States) Screen (Kentucky) (United States) Cortes (Georgia Southern) (United States) Hodge (Georgia State)	(United States) Gaither (Mercer) (United States) Pariano (Duke) (France) Jacquesson (Pitt) (United States) Rouse (Kentucky) (Scotland) Finnie (Georgia State)	(England) **Harris** (Wake Forest) (Germany) Dexter (Pitt)	(Sudan) Chol (Wake Forest) (England) Davie (Georgia Southern) (England) Fearnely (Georgia State) (Canada) Loughrey (UAB) (United States) Wright (Duke)
Oct. 6	(United States) Smir (North Carolina)	(Zambia) **Mabika** (Kentucky) (United States) Rula (Wake Forest) (United States) Constant (North Carolina)	(England) Fearnley (Georgia State) (United States) Rouse (Kentucky) (United States) Barber (Clemson)	(United States) Holcomb (Wake Forest) (Spain) Seye (Clemson) (Brazil) Fonseca (Louisville) (United States) Briggs (Georgia State)	(Sudan) Chol (Wake Forest) (Norway) Bjorgolfsson (Kentucky) (England) Proctor (Georgia State) (United States) Sample (Louisville)
Oct. 13	(United States) Shutler (Virginia)	(Italy) Zattarin (North Carolina) (United States) Meyer (Notre Dame) (France) Couteau (Coastal Carolina) (Guinea-Bissau) Soumah (South Carolina)	(Serbia) Petkovic (Pitt) (United States) Parente (Wake Forest) (United States) Doran (Duke) (France) **Jacquesson** (Pitt) (Denmark) Jensen (Central Arkansas)	(United States) Wrona (Wake Forest)	(United States) Benalcázar (Wake Forest) (United States) Lynn (Notre Dame) (United States) Brady (South Carolina) (United States) Pariano (Duke) (Senegal) Malou (Clemson) (England) Tyson (Georgia State) (France) Noël (Pitt)
Oct. 20	(England) Tyson (Georgia State)	(United States) Lage (Coastal Carolina) (Spain) Ordoñez (Pitt) (Sweden) Ågren (Clemson)	(England) Bennett (Georgia State) (France) Noël (Pitt) (United Arab Emirates) El-Medkhar (Kentucky) (United States) Guest (Georgia State) (United States) Jackson (Navy)	(England) **Smith** (Clemson) (Canada) Kerr (Syracuse)	(Norway) Bjorgolfsson (Kentucky) (United States) Brighton (Clemson) (Kenya) Abdikadir (Louisville) (United States) Pereira (Virginia Tech)
Oct. 27	(United States) Shealy (Syracuse)	(Senegal) Malou (Clemson) (United States) Washington (Pitt)	(Denmark) Jensen (Central Arkansas) (United States) Hernandez (Wake Forest) (Serbia) Petkovic (Pitt) (Republic of Ireland) **McFadden** (Notre Dame)	(United States) Backlock (Virginia Tech) (United States) Barber (Clemson) (United States) Hackenberg (Coastal Carolina) (England) Harris (Wake Forest)	(United States) Rando (Virginia) (United States) Doran (Duke) (Spain) Suárez (Central Arkansas) (United States) Pannenberg (Wake Forest) (United States) Quinton (Notre Dame)
Nov. 3	(United States) Rando (Virginia)	(Spain) Suárez (Central Arkansas) (United States) Constant (North Carolina) (Norway) Ueland (Virginia) (Jamaica) Edwards (NC State) (United States) Benalcázar (Wake Forest)	(Venezuela) Pereira (Virginia Tech) (England) Fearnley (Georgia State)	(England) Smith (Clemson) (United States) **Labovitz** (Virginia Tech) (Sudan) Chol (Wake Forest)	(England) Harris (Wake Forest) (United States) Strickler (Virginia Tech) (United States) Laufer (Central Arkansas) (United States) Barber (Clemson)
Nov. 10	(England) Tyson (Georgia State)	(United States) Constant (North Carolina) (Denmark) Skraep (Coastal Carolina) (United States) Tubbs (Wake Forest) (England) Proctor (Georgia State)	(Venezuela) Pereira (Virginia Tech) (Italy) Giacobello (Notre Dame) (England) Jones (Coastal Carolina) (United States) Kinyua (Virginia Tech)	(United States) Holcomb (Wake Forest) (United States) Lynn (Notre Dame)	(United States) Labovitz (Virginia Tech) (United States) Parente (Wake Forest)
Nov. 17	(United States) Saunders (Coastal Carolina)	(England) Henderson (Georgia State) (Norway) Ueland (Virginia) (United States) Lage (Coastal Carolina)	(Switzerland) Walti (Pitt) (Republic of Ireland) McFadden (Notre Dame) (France) Noël (Pitt)	(United States) Barber (Clemson) (Zimbabwe) Kamseu (Virginia) (Costa Rica) Leiva (Coastal Carolina) (England) **Smith** (Clemson)	—N/a

=== Major upsets ===
In this list, a "major upset" is defined as a game won by an unranked team that defeats a ranked team.

All rankings are from the United Soccer Coaches Poll.

Date	Winner	Score	Loser
October 9, 2020	**North Carolina**	1–0	No. 3 Clemson
October 13, 2020	**Clemson**	2–1	No. 1 Wake Forest
November 15, 2020	**Virginia**	2–0	No. 2 Wake Forest

=== Fall postseason ===
==== Conference winners and tournaments ====
Conference	Regular Season Champion(s)	Tournament Winner	Conference Tournament	Tournament Dates	Tournament Venue (City)
ACC	North- Pitt; South- Wake Forest	Clemson	Tournament	November 15–22	Dorrance Field • Chapel Hill, NC
Sun Belt	Coastal Carolina	Coastal Carolina	Tournament	November 11–15	GSU Soccer Field • Atlanta, GA

== Spring 2021 season ==
=== Standings ===
Note: W-L-T records are through the Finals of the NCAA tournament.

2020 America East Conference men's soccer standings
	Conf.					Overall
Team	W		L		T	W		L		T
Pod A
No. 19 New Hampshire ‡	5	–	0	–	1	8	–	1	–	1
Vermont	4	–	1	–	1	5	–	2	–	1
UMass Lowell	1	–	4	–	1	1	–	6	–	1
Pod B
Hartford	3	–	2	–	1	3	–	3	–	1
Binghamton	2	–	4	–	0	2	–	4	–	0
Albany	2	–	4	–	0	3	–	5	–	1
Pod C
NJIT	4	–	2	–	0	4	–	5	–	1
UMBC	2	–	3	–	1	3	–	4	–	1
Stony Brook	1	–	4	–	1	1	–	6	–	1
‡ – 2020 Am. East Tournament champion + – Also invited to the 2020 NCAA tournament; As of May 28, 2021; Rankings from United Soccer Coaches; Note: Due to COVID-19, the NCAA suspended the 2020 men's soccer season for fall

2020 American Athletic Conference men's soccer standings
	Conf.					Overall
Team	W		L		T	W		L		T
No. 13 UCF ‡	7	–	3	–	0	9	–	4	–	1
Tulsa	6	–	3	–	1	6	–	4	–	2
Temple	5	–	4	–	1	5	–	4	–	2
SMU	5	–	5	–	0	5	–	5	–	1
South Florida	4	–	6	–	0	4	–	6	–	0
Memphis	2	–	8	–	0	2	–	8	–	0
Note: Due to COVID-19, the NCAA suspended the 2020 men's soccer season for fall ‡ – 2020 American Tournament champion + – Also invited to the 2020 NCAA Tournament; As of May 28, 2021; Rankings from United Soccer Coaches

2020 Atlantic 10 Conference men's soccer standings
	Conf.					Overall
Team	W		L		T	W		L		T
Central
George Washington	3	–	1	–	2	5	–	3	–	2
VCU	3	–	2	–	1	4	–	3	–	2
Davidson	2	–	2	–	2	3	–	4	–	2
George Mason	0	–	3	–	3	0	–	6	–	3
North
No. 22 Fordham ‡	3	–	0	–	2	7	–	1	–	2
UMass +	3	–	1	–	2	7	–	2	–	2
La Salle	2	–	3	–	1	5	–	5	–	1
Rhode Island	1	–	3	–	1	2	–	4	–	1
Saint Joseph's	1	–	4	–	0	3	–	7	–	0
West
Dayton	4	–	1	–	1	4	–	4	–	1
Saint Louis	4	–	2	–	0	9	–	5	–	0
Duquesne	2	–	4	–	0	2	–	5	–	0
St. Bonaventure	1	–	4	–	1	4	–	4	–	1
‡ – 2020 Atlantic 10 Tournament champion + – Also invited to the 2020 NCAA tournament; As of May 28, 2021; Rankings from United Soccer Coaches

2020 ACC men's spring soccer standings
	Conf.					Overall
Team	W		L		T	W		L		T
Atlantic
No. 7 Clemson ‡	4	–	1	–	1	14	–	3	–	3
Louisville	4	–	2	–	0	5	–	8	–	1
No. 6 Wake Forest +	3	–	0	–	2	13	–	3	–	2
NC State	1	–	2	–	3	3	–	8	–	4
Boston College *	1	–	3	–	1	1	–	3	–	1
Syracuse	0	–	3	–	1	2	–	7	–	4
Coastal
No. 3 Pittsburgh +	5	–	1	–	0	16	–	4	–	0
No. 4 North Carolina +	4	–	1	–	1	9	–	5	–	4
Duke	2	–	3	–	1	3	–	10	–	3
Virginia	2	–	4	–	0	7	–	8	–	1
No. 15 Virginia Tech +	2	–	4	–	0	7	–	6	–	4
Notre Dame	1	–	5	–	0	8	–	9	–	0
‡ – 2020 ACC Fall Tournament champion + – Also invited to the 2020 NCAA Tournament; As of May 18, 2021; Rankings from United Soccer Coaches; Source:The ACC; Note: *- Due to COVID-19, Boston College suspended the Fall 2020 men's soccer season; began play in March.

2020 ASUN Conference men's soccer standings
	Conf.					Overall
Team	W		L		T	W		L		T
North
Bellarmine ^{#}	3	–	1	–	0	4	–	4	–	0
Liberty	1	–	3	–	1	7	–	3	–	2
Lipscomb	1	–	2	–	1	6	–	5	–	2
South
Jacksonville ‡	4	–	2	–	0	7	–	4	–	2
North Florida	2	–	2	–	2	4	–	3	–	3
Florida Gulf Coast	2	–	2	–	2	3	–	4	–	4
Stetson	1	–	3	–	2	1	–	5	–	2
‡ – 2021 Spring ASUN Tournament champion + – Also invited to the 2020 NCAA tournament ^{#} – Ineligible for post-season (In transition); As of May 3, 2021; Rankings from United Soccer Coaches

2020 Big East Conference men's soccer standings
	Conf.					Overall
Team	W		L		T	W		L		T
East
No. 5 Georgetown +	7	–	0	–	2	9	–	2	–	2
No. 9 Seton Hall ‡	5	–	1	–	2	10	–	2	–	3
Providence	3	–	3	–	1	4	–	4	–	1
St. John's	3	–	5	–	0	5	–	5	–	0
Villanova	2	–	5	–	0	2	–	8	–	0
UConn	0	–	6	–	1	1	–	6	–	1
Midwest
No. 14 Marquette +	5	–	1	–	1	8	–	2	–	2
Creighton	5	–	3	–	0	6	–	6	–	0
Butler	4	–	2	–	2	4	–	6	–	2
DePaul	2	–	5	–	0	2	–	5	–	2
Xavier	0	–	5	–	1	3	–	7	–	1
‡ – 2020 Big East Tournament champion + – Also invited to the 2020 NCAA tournament; As of May 28, 2021; Rankings from United Soccer Coaches

2020 Big South Conference men's soccer standings
	Conf.					Overall
Team	W		L		T	W		L		T
No. 23 High Point ‡	8	–	0	–	0	12	–	2	–	0
USC Upstate	6	–	1	–	1	6	–	4	–	2
Campbell	5	–	1	–	1	8	–	2	–	2
UNC Asheville	3	–	4	–	1	3	–	5	–	1
Gardner–Webb	3	–	5	–	0	5	–	6	–	0
Presbyterian	2	–	4	–	2	4	–	4	–	2
Radford	2	–	4	–	1	3	–	5	–	1
Longwood	1	–	5	–	1	2	–	6	–	1
Winthrop	0	–	7	–	1	0	–	8	–	1
‡ – 2020 Big South Tournament champion + – Also invited to the 2020 NCAA tournament; As of May 28, 2021; Rankings from United Soccer Coaches

2020 Big Ten Conference men's soccer standings
	Conf.					Overall
Team	W		L		T	W		L		T
No. 2 Indiana ‡	7	–	1	–	0	12	–	2	–	2
No. 11 Penn State +	6	–	1	–	1	10	–	2	–	2
Michigan	5	–	3	–	1	6	–	4	–	1
Maryland +	4	–	3	–	1	4	–	5	–	2
Rutgers	4	–	4	–	0	4	–	4	–	1
Michigan State	4	–	6	–	0	4	–	7	–	0
Ohio State	3	–	5	–	1	3	–	6	–	1
Northwestern	2	–	7	–	1	2	–	8	–	1
Wisconsin	2	–	7	–	1	2	–	7	–	1
‡ – 2020 B1G Tournament champion + – Also invited to the 2020 NCAA Tournament; As of May 28, 2021; Rankings from United Soccer Coaches; Source: Big Ten

2020 Colonial Athletic Association men's soccer standings
	Conf.					Overall
Team	W		L		T	W		L		T
North
Hofstra	2	–	0	–	2	5	–	2	–	3
Drexel	2	–	1	–	1	6	–	3	–	2
Delaware	1	–	1	–	2	2	–	1	–	2
Northeastern	0	–	3	–	1	0	–	5	–	1
South
No. 21 James Madison ‡	4	–	0	–	0	5	–	2	–	3
UNC Wilmington	2	–	1	–	1	5	–	3	–	2
Elon	2	–	2	–	0	3	–	5	–	0
William & Mary	1	–	3	–	0	2	–	4	–	0
Charleston	0	–	3	–	1	1	–	5	–	3
‡ – 2020 CAA Tournament champion + – Also invited to the 2020 NCAA Tournament; As of May 28, 2021; Rankings from United Soccer Coaches

2020 Conference USA men's soccer standings
	Conf.					Overall
Team	W		L		T	W		L		T
No. 1 Marshall ‡	6	–	0	–	1	13	–	2	–	3
No. 20 Charlotte +	6	–	1	–	0	6	–	3	–	2
No. 16 Kentucky +	3	–	3	–	1	12	–	5	–	2
FIU	3	–	3	–	1	4	–	4	–	1
Florida Atlantic	3	–	4	–	0	6	–	4	–	2
South Carolina	2	–	4	–	1	8	–	7	–	1
UAB	1	–	5	–	1	3	–	12	–	1
Old Dominion	0	–	4	–	3	1	–	4	–	3
‡ – Conference USA champion + – Also invited to the 2020 NCAA tournament; As of May 18, 2021; Rankings from United Soccer Coaches

2020 Horizon League men's soccer standings
	Conf.					Overall
Team	W		L		T	W		L		T
Northern Kentucky	7	–	1	–	0	7	–	2	–	0
Oakland	6	–	1	–	2	6	–	1	–	2
UIC	6	–	2	–	1	6	–	3	–	1
Milwaukee ‡	6	–	4	–	0	8	–	5	–	0
Wright State	5	–	3	–	1	5	–	3	–	1
Cleveland State	4	–	5	–	0	4	–	5	–	0
Green Bay	3	–	4	–	1	3	–	4	–	1
Purdue Fort Wayne	3	–	6	–	0	3	–	6	–	0
Detroit Mercy	2	–	5	–	0	2	–	5	–	0
Robert Morris	1	–	6	–	1	1	–	6	–	1
IUPUI	0	–	6	–	0	0	–	6	–	0
‡ – 2020 Horizon Tournament champion + – Also invited to the 2020 NCAA Tournament; As of May 28, 2021; Rankings from United Soccer Coaches

2020 Metro Atlantic Athletic Conference men's soccer standings
	Conf.					Overall
Team	W		L		T	W		L		T
Quinnipiac	5	–	1	–	0	7	–	2	–	0
Rider	2	–	0	–	1	3	–	1	–	1
Niagara	4	–	2	–	0	5	–	3	–	0
Saint Peter's	3	–	2	–	1	3	–	3	–	1
Fairfield	3	–	2	–	1	4	–	3	–	1
Monmouth ‡	2	–	2	–	1	6	–	3	–	1
Iona	2	–	3	–	1	2	–	4	–	1
Manhattan	2	–	4	–	0	2	–	4	–	0
Siena	2	–	4	–	1	2	–	6	–	1
Canisius	0	–	5	–	0	0	–	6	–	0
‡ – 2020 MAAC Tournament champion + – Also invited to the 2020 NCAA tournament; As of May 3, 2021; Rankings from United Soccer Coaches

2020 Mid-American Conference men's soccer standings
	Conf.					Overall
Team	W		L		T	W		L		T
Bowling Green †	5	–	2	–	1	7	–	5	–	1
Western Michigan	5	–	3	–	1	7	–	3	–	1
West Virginia	4	–	3	–	1	6	–	3	–	1
Akron	3	–	4	–	1	4	–	4	–	2
Northern Illinois	4	–	6	–	0	5	–	8	–	1
SIU Edwardsville	2	–	5	–	0	5	–	5	–	0
† – Conference champion + – Also invited to the 2020 NCAA tournament; As of May 3, 2021; Rankings from United Soccer Coaches

2020 Missouri Valley Conference men's soccer standings
	Conf.					Overall
Team	W		L		T	W		L		T
No. 12 Missouri State ‡	7	–	1	–	0	12	–	2	–	0
Loyola Chicago	5	–	2	–	1	7	–	4	–	2
Drake	5	–	2	–	1	5	–	3	–	1
Bradley	1	–	6	–	1	2	–	7	–	2
Evansville	0	–	7	–	1	0	–	9	–	1
‡ – 2020 MVC Tournament champion + – Also invited to the 2020 NCAA Tournament; As of May 28, 2021; Rankings from United Soccer Coaches

2020 Northeast Conference men's soccer standings
	Conf.					Overall
Team	W		L		T	W		L		T
St. Francis Brooklyn ‡	5	–	1	–	1	6	–	1	–	3
LIU	3	–	1	–	3	3	–	1	–	4
Central Connecticut	3	–	3	–	1	3	–	3	–	1
Merrimack ^{#}	2	–	1	–	2	2	–	1	–	2
Bryant	2	–	2	–	2	2	–	2	–	2
Fairleigh Dickinson	2	–	3	–	1	2	–	5	–	1
Mount St. Mary's	1	–	3	–	2	1	–	5	–	2
Sacred Heart	1	–	5	–	0	1	–	6	–	0
‡ – 2020 NEC Tournament champion + – Also invited to the 2020 NCAA tournament ^{#} – Ineligible for post-season (In transition); As of May 3, 2021; Rankings from United Soccer Coaches

2020 Patriot League men's soccer standings
	Conf.					Overall
Team	W		L		T	W		L		T
North
Lafayette	4	–	0	–	0	7	–	1	–	0
Holy Cross	2	–	1	–	0	2	–	2	–	0
Boston University	1	–	2	–	1	1	–	2	–	1
Colgate	1	–	2	–	0	1	–	3	–	1
Army	0	–	3	–	1	0	–	3	–	1
South
Loyola (MD)	3	–	1	–	1	3	–	2	–	1
American ‡	2	–	1	–	2	4	–	2	–	3
Navy	2	–	1	–	1	4	–	2	–	1
Bucknell	1	–	3	–	0	1	–	4	–	1
Lehigh	1	–	4	–	0	1	–	4	–	0
As of May 28, 2021

2020 Pac-12 Conference men's soccer standings
	Conf.					Overall
Team	W		L		T	W		L		T
No. 10 Stanford †	7	–	2	–	1	10	–	3	–	1
No. 8 Washington +	7	–	3	–	0	12	–	4	–	0
No. 18 Oregon State +	6	–	4	–	0	9	–	5	–	0
California	4	–	5	–	1	4	–	5	–	1
UCLA	2	–	6	–	2	3	–	7	–	2
San Diego State	1	–	7	–	2	1	–	7	–	2
† – Conference champion on points per game + – Also invited to the 2020 NCAA tournament; As of May 28, 2021; Rankings from United Soccer Coaches

2020 Southern Conference men's soccer standings
	Conf.					Overall
Team	W		L		T	W		L		T
Furman	5	–	0	–	1	7	–	2	–	1
UNCG ‡	3	–	1	–	2	9	–	3	–	2
East Tennessee State	3	–	1	–	2	3	–	5	–	3
Belmont	3	–	2	–	1	7	–	3	–	2
Mercer	2	–	3	–	1	4	–	9	–	1
Wofford	1	–	4	–	1	1	–	7	–	1
VMI	0	–	6	–	0	2	–	9	–	0
‡– 2020 SoCon Tournament Champion + – Also invited to the 2020 NCAA tournament; As of May 3, 2021; Rankings from United Soccer Coaches

2020 Summit League men's soccer standings
	Conf.					Overall
Team	W		L		T	W		L		T
Denver †	6	–	2	–	0	6	–	2	–	0
Omaha +	5	–	2	–	1	7	–	3	–	1
Oral Roberts	6	–	3	–	1	8	–	4	–	1
Kansas City	5	–	4	–	1	5	–	8	–	1
Western Illinois	2	–	6	–	1	2	–	8	–	2
Eastern Illinois	0	–	7	–	2	0	–	8	–	2
↑ – Season title based on points per game + – Omaha replaced Denver in the 2020 NCAA Tournament due to Covid-19 protocols; As of May 3, 2021; Rankings from United Soccer Coaches

2020 Sun Belt Conference men's spring soccer standings
	Conf.					Overall
Team	W		L		T	W		L		T
#24 Coastal Carolina ‡	5	–	1	–	0	9	–	4	–	2
Georgia State	4	–	2	–	0	9	–	2	–	2
Central Arkansas	3	–	3	–	0	6	–	9	–	2
Georgia Southern	0	–	6	–	0	1	–	9	–	0
‡ – 2020 Sun Belt Tournament Champion + – Also invited to the 2020 NCAA tournament Note: † Due to COVID-19, Howard suspended the 2020 men's soccer season.; As of May 28, Rankings from United Soccer Coaches

2020 West Coast Conference men's soccer standings
	Conf.					Overall
Team	W		L		T	W		L		T
No. 17Loyola Marymount†	5	–	0	–	2	6	–	0	–	3
Saint Mary's	4	–	2	–	1	6	–	2	–	1
Santa Clara	4	–	3	–	0	4	–	4	–	0
San Francisco	3	–	2	–	2	4	–	4	–	2
San Diego	3	–	2	–	2	3	–	3	–	2
Portland	1	–	3	–	3	2	–	4	–	3
Pacific	2	–	4	–	0	2	–	7	–	0
Gonzaga	0	–	6	–	0	2	–	9	–	0
† – Conference champion + – Also invited to the 2020 NCAA tournament; As of May 28, 2021; Rankings from United Soccer Coaches

2020 Western Athletic Conference men's soccer standings
	Conf.					Overall
Team	W		L		T	W		L		T
No. 25 Grand Canyon +	7	–	0	–	0	8	–	2	–	0
UTRGV	6	–	1	–	2	6	–	2	–	2
San Jose State	5	–	1	–	2	5	–	1	–	3
California Baptist ^{#}	5	–	4	–	1	6	–	4	–	2
UNLV	4	–	4	–	2	4	–	5	–	2
Seattle	4	–	2	–	1	6	–	4	–	1
Air Force ‡	4	–	4	–	1	6	–	5	–	2
Dixie State ^{#}	3	–	6	–	0	3	–	6	–	0
Utah Valley	2	–	4	–	0	3	–	4	–	0
Incarnate Word	2	–	7	–	0	2	–	7	–	0
Houston Baptist	0	–	9	–	1	0	–	9	–	2
Chicago State ¿	0	–	0	–	0	1	–	2	–	0
‡ – Conference tournament champion + – Also invited to the 2020 NCAA tournament # – Ineligible (In transition) ¿– Not competing in WAC until 2022; As of May 28, 2021; Rankings from United Soccer Coaches

=== Rankings ===
==== Top-ranked team ====
Weekly United Soccer Coaches #1 ranked team (Spring 2021)
Date	Team	Date	Team	Date	Team	Date	Team
January 11 (preseason)		None until after season starts		February 8	—	February 15	—
February 22	—	March 1	Clemson	March 8	Clemson	March 15	Clemson
March 22	Clemson	March 29	Clemson	April 5	Pitt	April 12	Pitt
April 19		April 26		None until after tournament		May 24	

=== Top Drawer Soccer Team of the Week ===
- **Bold** denotes TDS player of the week.

Team of the week
Week	Goalkeeper	Defenders	Midfielders	Forwards	Honorable mention
Feb. 9	(Canada) Schneider (UTRGV)	(United States) Cashion (Tulsa) (United States) Haney (SMU) (United States) Niece (Saint Louis)	(United States) Matulis (Air Force) (United States) Meek (Washington) (United States) **Borczak** (Oakland) (Canada) Campbell (Temple)	(United States) Henderlong (Xavier) (United States) Farrington (Milwaukee) (England) Smith (Lipscomb)	(Canada) Jensen (Oakland) (United States) Teves (Washington) (Greece) Vasilas (UIC) (Germany) Lenz (SIUE) (United States) Poorman (Detroit Mercy) (United States) Hafferty (Oregon State) (United States) Scardina (Washington) (United States) Daniel (Air Force) (United States) Ortiz (Seattle U) (England) Gill (Central Arkansas)
Feb. 16	(United States) Kuzemka (Charlotte)	(Italy) Posarelli (Marquette) (United States) Collins (La Salle) (Brazil) Rosa (UCF) (United States) Asensio (Kentucky)	(United States) Dougherty (Lipscomb) (United States) Soronellas (North Florida) (Germany) Doğan (Seattle U)	(Senegal) Ndoye (SMU) (Tanzania) **Amanda** (Oregon State) (United States) Halloran (South Carolina)	(United States) Taylor (SMU) (United States) Shockey (Loyola Marymount) (United States) Murphy (Duke) (Germany) Gutia (Incarnate Word) (United States) Tingey (Stanford) (United States) Kocevski (Syracuse)

=== Spring postseason ===
==== Conference winners and tournaments ====
Conference	Regular Season Champion(s)	Tournament Winner	Conference Tournament	Tournament Dates	Tournament Venue (City)
America East	New Hampshire	New Hampshire	2020 Tournament	April 15–17	Wildcat Stadium (Durham, NH)
American	UCF	UCF	2020 Tournament	April 16–18	UCF Soccer and Track Stadium (Orlando, FL)
ASUN	North: Bellarmine (Note: For the rescheduled spring 2021 season only, the ASUN split into divisions, with conference standings based strictly on results within each division.); South: Jacksonville	Jacksonville	2020 Tournament (Note: The ASUN Conference officially called this season's tournament the "2021 Spring" edition.)	April 10–18 (Note: The final, originally scheduled for April 17 at Jacksonville University's Southern Oak Stadium, was postponed to the following day due to unplayable field conditions and moved to the Stetson University campus.)	Quarterfinals: Campus sites Semifinals: Southern Oak Stadium (Jacksonville, FL); Final: Stetson Athletic Training Center (DeLand, FL)
Atlantic 10	Dayton	Fordham	2020 Tournament	April 15–17	Baujan Field (Dayton, OH)
Big East	Georgetown	Seton Hall	2020 Tournament	TBD	Shaw Field (Washington, DC)
Big South	High Point	High Point	2020 Tournament	April 14–17	Higher seed
Big Ten	Indiana	Indiana	2020 Tournament	April 10–17	Bill Armstrong Stadium (Bloomington, IN)
Big West	Season cancelled due to COVID-19				
Colonial	James Madison	James Madison	2020 Tournament	April 15–17	Vidas Field (Philadelphia, PA)
Conference USA	Marshall	Tournament cancelled due to COVID-19			
Horizon	Northern Kentucky	Milwaukee	2020 Tournament	April 11–17	Higher seed
Ivy	Season cancelled due to COVID-19				
MAAC	Quinnipiac	Monmouth	2020 Tournament	April 11–17	Higher seed
Mid-American	Bowling Green	No tournament			
Missouri Valley	Missouri State	Missouri State	2020 Tournament	April 13–17	Higher seed
Northeast	St. Francis Brooklyn	St. Francis Brooklyn	2020 Tournament	April 16–18	Higher seed
Pac-12	Washington	No tournament			
Patriot	Lafayette	American	2020 Tournament	TBD	TBD
Southern	Furman	UNCG	2020 Tournament	TBD	TBD
Summit	Denver (Note: Omaha replaced Summit League champion Denver in the 2020 NCAA tournament due to COVID-19 protocols.)	No tournament			
WAC	Grand Canyon	Air Force	2020 Tournament	TBD	TBD
West Coast	Loyola Marymount	No tournament			

=== Postseason awards ===
==== Hermann Trophy ====
The Hermann Trophy is given to the year's most outstanding player. The finalists were announced on May 21. On May 27, 2021, Gloire Amanda of Oregon State won the Hermann Trophy.

- **Glorie Amanda – Oregon State**
- Victor Bezerra – Indiana
- Valentin Noël – Pitt

==== TDS National Player of the Year ====
The TopDrawerSoccer.com National Player of the Year Award recognizes the top college soccer player in the nation by the TDS staff. On May 25, 2021, Veljko Petkovic of Pitt won the award.

- **Veljko Petković – Pitt**

==== Senior CLASS Award ====
- The Senior CLASS Award is presented each year to the most outstanding senior in NCAA Division I. Thomas M'Barek of Cleveland State won the award. The following finalists were:
  - Jacob Graiber (DF), UIC
  - Justin Malou (DF), Clemson
  - **Thomas M'Barek (DF), Cleveland State**
  - Jacob Montes (MF), Georgetown
  - Yannik Oettl (GK), UCF
  - George Proctor (DF), Georgia State
  - Tor Saunders (GK), Coastal Carolina
  - Chris Sullivan (MF), Bowling Green
  - Joel Walker (FW), Oregon State
  - Marc Ybarra (MF), Michigan

==== Conference player and coaches of the year ====
Conference	Conference Player of the Year	Offensive Player of the Year	Defensive Player of the Year	Midfielder of the Year	Goalkeeper of the Year	Rookie of the Year	Conference Coach of the Year
ACC	—N/a	Valentin Noel (Pitt)	Jasper Löeffelsend (Pitt)	Daniel Pereira (Virginia Tech)	—N/a	Bertin Jacquesson (Pitt)	Jay Vidovich (Pitt)
America East	—N/a	Regsan Watkins (NJIT)	Bridger Hansen (New Hampshire)	Rory O'Driscoll (New Hampshire)	Alejandro Robles (New Hampshire)	Daniel Pacella (Vermont)	Marc Hubbard (New Hampshire)
American	—N/a	Alex Meinhard (Tulsa)	Pierre Cayet (Temple)	Yoni Sorokin & Knut Ahlander (UCF) & (SMU)	Yannik Oettl (UCF)	Gino Vivi (UCF)	Scott Calabrese (UCF)
ASUN	O'Vonte Mullings (FGCU)	O'Vonte Mullings (FGCU)	Ethan Dudley (FGCU)	—N/a	Gustavo Vasconcelos (FGCU)	Gabe Findley (Liberty)	Tim Chastonay (Bellarmine)
Atlantic 10	—N/a	Jonas Fjeldberg (Dayton)	Patrick Shulte (Saint Louis)	Kingsford Adjei (Dayton)	—N/a	Alex Hughes (UMass)	Dennis Currier (Dayton)
Big East	—N/a	Diego Gutierrez (Creighton)	Rio Hope-Gund (Georgetown)	Dante Polvara (Georgetown)	Giannis Nikopolidis (Georgetown)	Beto Soto (Marquette)	Andreas Lindberg (Seton Hall)
Big South	—N/a	MD Myers (High Point)	Franck Momo (Campbell)	—N/a	—N/a	Sami Amal (Campbell)	Scott Halkett (USC Upstate)
Big Ten	—N/a	Victor Bezerra (Indiana)	Jackson Ragen (Michigan)	Marc Ybarra (Michigan)	Roman Celenato (Indiana)	Laurence Wootton (Ohio State)	Todd Yeagley (Indiana)
Big West	Season canceled due to COVID-19						
Colonial	Laolu Daranijo (Drexel)	Laolu Daranijo (Drexel)	T.J. Bush (James Madison)	—N/a	—N/a	Axel Ahlander (James Madison)	Paul Zazenski (James Madison)
Conference USA	Vitor Dias (Marshall)	Vitor Dias (Marshall)	Patrick Hogan (Charlotte)	Preston Popp (Charlotte)	Oliver Semmle (Marshall)	Josh Thacker (Old Dominion)	Chris Grassie (Marshall)
Horizon	Noah Jensen (Oakland)	Dylan Borczak (Oakland)	Jacob Graiber (UIC)	—N/a	Danny Birmingham (Northern Kentucky)	Logan Farrington (Milwaukee)	Stu Riddle (Northern Kentucky)
Ivy	Season canceled due to COVID-19						
MAAC	—N/a	Dominic Law (Saint Peter's)	George Akampeke (Monmouth)	—N/a	Jared Mazzola (Quinnipiac)	Thomas Drillien (Fairfield)	Robert McCourt (Monmouth)
Mid-American	Nick Markanich (Northern Illinois)	—N/a	—N/a	—N/a	—N/a	Harry Jolley (Northern Illinois)	Eric Nichols (Bowling Green)
Missouri Valley	Billy Hency (Loyola Chicago)	Nicolo Mulatero (Missouri State)	Kyle Hiebert (Missouri State)	—N/a	Bryce Logan (Bradley)	Pablo Guillen (Evansville)	Jon Leamy (Missouri State)
Northeast	Nicolas Molina (St. Francis Brooklyn)	—N/a	Harald Sollund (St. Francis Brooklyn)	—N/a	Callum James (Oakland)	Emil Jaaskelainen (LIU)	Tom Giovatto (St. Francis Brooklyn)
Pac-12	Zach Ryan (Stanford)	—N/a	Charlie Ostrem (Washington)	—N/a	—N/a	Mark Fisher (Stanford)	Jamie Clark (Washington)
Patriot	—N/a	Sam Brown (Loyola Maryland)	Nick Hazel (Lafayette) & Matt Nocita (Navy)	Justin Ingram (Loyola Maryland)	Chase Vosvick (Loyola Maryland)	David Jackson (Navy)	Dennis Bohn (Lafayette)
Southern	Ben Hale (Furman)	—N/a	—N/a	—N/a	Ben Hale (Furman)	Theo Collomb (UNCG) & Jake Raine (Furman)	Doug Allison (Furman)
Summit	—N/a	Dante Brigida (Oral Roberts)	Fitzroy Cummings (Omaha)	—N/a	Cooper Clark (Kansas City)	Hugo Kametani (Omaha)	Ryan Pore (Kansas City)
Sun Belt	George Proctor (Georgia State)	Aris Briggs (Georgia State)	George Proctor (Georgia State)	—N/a	—N/a	Newcomer: Tor Saunders (Coastal Carolina); Freshman: Jason Kemble (Coastal Carolina)	Shaun Docking (Coastal Carolina)
WAC	—N/a	William Akio (UTRGV)	George Tasouris (Grand Canyon)	—N/a	—N/a	Maximilian Moeller (Grand Canyon)	Schellas Hyndman (Grand Canyon)
West Coast	—N/a	Noel Caliskan (Loyola Marymount)	Gerardo Lopez (Loyola Marymount)	—N/a	Jacob Jackson (Loyola Marymount)	Nonso Adimabua (San Francisco)	Paul Krumpe (Loyola Marymount)

=== Other major awards ===
- United Soccer Coaches College Coach of the Year: Chris Grassie, Marshall
- Bill Jeffrey Award:
- Glenn Myernick Award:
- Jerry Yeagley Award: Raymon Gaddis
- Mike Berticelli Award: Neil Hull
- NCAA Division I Men's Soccer Tournament Most Outstanding Player:
  - Offensive: Jamil Roberts, Marshall
  - Defensive: Roman Celentano, Indiana
- TopDrawerSoccer.com National Freshman of the Year Award: Bertin Jacquesson, Pitt

=== Final rankings ===
Rank	United Soccer Coaches	TopDrawerSoccer.com	College Soccer News
1	Marshall		
2	Indiana		
3	Pitt		
4	North Carolina		
5	Georgetown		
6	Wake Forest		
7	Clemson		
8	Washington		
9	Seton Hall		
10	Stanford		
11	Penn State		
12	Missouri State		
13	UCF		
14	Marquette		
15	Virginia Tech		
16	Kentucky		
17	Loyola Marymount		
18	Oregon State		
19	New Hampshire		
20	Charlotte		
21	James Madison		
22	Fordham		
23	High Point		
24	Coastal Carolina		
25	Grand Canyon		
26			
27			
28			
29			
30			

== Statistics ==
=== Individual statistics ===
Goals
Rank	Scorer	School	Games	Goals
1	Glorie Amanda	Oregon State	12	13
2	MD Myers	High Point	12	12
3	Valentin Noel	Pitt	14	11
4	Victor Bezerra	Indiana	10	10
4	Laolu Daranijo	Drexel	11	10
4	Paolo Gratton	Milwaukee	11	10
7	Sebastian Chalbaud	High Point	12	9
7	Nick Markanich	Northern Illinois	13	9
7	Zach Ryan	Stanford	11	9
10	Chris Donovan	Drexel	10	8
10	Jack Lynn	Notre Dame	16	8
10	Kimarni Smith	Clemson	11	8

Goals Against Average
Rank	Keeper	School	Games	Minutes	GA	GAA
1	Roman Celentano	Indiana	10	903	2	.199
2	Jacob Jackson	Loyola Marymount	8	760	2	.237
3	Giannis Nikopolidis	Georgetown	8	671	2	.268
4	T.J. Bush	James Madison	7	662	2	.272
5	Padraic Gilley	North Florida	6	580	2	.310
6	Oliver Semmle	Marshall	12	1085	5	.415
7	Nathan Silveira	Vermont	6	560	3	.482
8	Holden Trent	High Point	12	1072	6	.503
9	Alejandro Robles	New Hampshire	8	700	4	.514
10	Justin Grady	George Washington	9	871	5	.516

Assists
Rank	Player	School	Games	Assists
1	Noah Jensen	Oakland	9	14
2	Rudy Castro	San Jose State	9	10
2	Charlie Ostrem	Washington	12	10
4	Joshua Kidder	Milwaukee	11	9
5	Gloire Amanda	Oregon State	12	7
5	Grayson Barber	Clemson	11	7
5	James Boote	Seton Hall	12	7
5	Marcello Jones	Coastal Carolina	14	7
5	Jasper Loeffelsend	Pitt	14	7
5	Nicolo Mulatero	Missouri State	11	7
5	Miles Peay	UNC Asheville	9	7
5	Dawsun Schrum	Oakland	9	7
5	Ben Shepherd	UMass	10	7

Save Percentage
Rank	Keeper	School	Games	Minutes	Saves	GA	Save %
1	Roman Celentano	Indiana	10	903	32	2	.941
2	T.J. Bush	James Madison	7	662	25	2	.926
3	Giannis Nikopolidis	Georgetown	8	671	19	2	.905
4	Yannik Oettl	UCF	9	841	47	5	.904
5	Jacob Jackson	Loyola Marymount	8	760	17	2	.895
6	Nathan Silveira	Vermont	6	560	22	3	.880
7	Justin Grady	George Washington	9	871	36	5	.878
8	Josh Levine	Fordham	8	779	35	5	.875
9	Chandler Hallwood	Marquette	10	899	41	6	.872
10	Paul Tyson	Georgia State	10	940	40	6	.870

Points
Rank	Player	School	Games	Goals	Assists	Points
1						
2						
3						
4						
5						
6						
7						
8						
9						
10						

Saves
Rank	Keeper	School	Games	Saves
1				
2				
3				
4				
5				
6				
7				
8				
9				
10				

- Individual statistics are through the games of April 17, 2021

== See also ==
- College soccer
- List of NCAA Division I men's soccer programs
- 2020 in American soccer
- 2020 NCAA Division I Men's Soccer Tournament
- 2020 NCAA Division I women's soccer season
