= ASUN men's soccer tournament =

American college soccer tournament

- Conference soccer championship
- Sport: College soccer
- Conference: ASUN Conference
- Number of teams: 6
- Format: Single-elimination tournament
- Current stadium: Campus sites
- Played: 1979–present
- Last contest: 2026
- Current champion: North Florida (4th title)
- Most championships: Georgia State & Lipscomb (5 titles each)
- TV partner(s): ESPN3, ESPN+, YouTube
- Official website: asunsports.org/msoc

The ASUN Men's Soccer Tournament is the conference championship tournament in soccer for the ASUN Conference (previously the Trans America Athletic Conference and Atlantic Sun Conference). The tournament has been held every year since 1978 except in 2020, when the ASUN moved its soccer season from fall 2020 to spring 2021 due to COVID-19 issues (resulting in two tournaments in calendar 2021). It is a single-elimination tournament and seeding is based on regular season records. The winner, declared conference champion, receives the conference's automatic bid to the NCAA Men's Division I Soccer Championship.

== Champions ==
The following is a list of ASUN Tournament winners:

=== Finals ===
Key

- (1) – Title number
- a.e.t. – Match went to extra time
- p – Match decided by a penalty shootout after extra time
- – Winning team won regular season
- – Winning team won National Championship

Year	Champion	Score	Runner-up	Venue	City	MVP
1979	Hardin-Simmons (1)	9–0	Louisiana–Monroe	HSU Soccer Field	Abilene, TX	not awarded
1980	Hardin-Simmons (2)	3–0	Georgia Southern	n/i	Monroe, LA	not awarded
1981	Louisiana–Monroe (1)	1–0 (a.e.t.)	Houston Baptist	n/i	Monroe, LA	not awarded
1982	Houston Baptist (1)	2–0	Mercer	n/i	Houston, TX	not awarded
1983	Georgia State (1)	1–0	Houston Baptist	n/i	Atlanta, GA	not awarded
1984	Houston Baptist (2)	2–1	Georgia State	n/i	Houston, TX	not awarded
1985	Houston Baptist (3)	2–1	Georgia State	n/i	Atlanta, GA	not awarded
1986	Georgia State (2)	2–1	Hardin-Simmons	n/i	Abilene, TX	not awarded
1987	Georgia State (3)	2–0	Centenary	n/i	Atlanta, GA	not awarded
1988	Centenary (1)	3–1	Georgia State	n/i	Shreveport, LA	not awarded
1989	Centenary (2)	4–3 (a.e.t.)	Georgia State	n/i	Atlanta, GA	not awarded
1990	Centenary (3)	2–1	Georgia Southern	n/i	Shreveport, LA	not awarded
1991	FIU (1)	3–0	Mercer	n/i	Miami, FL	not awarded
1992–1993	(no tournament held)					
1994	Charleston (1)	4–2 (a.e.t.)	FIU	n/i	Charleston, SC	Chad Carithers (Charleston)
1995	Charleston (2)	4–1	Campbell	n/i	Miami, FL	Stephen Khouri (Charleston)
1996	Charleston (3)	3–2	Campbell	n/i	Charleston, SC	Damon Richvalsky (Charleston)
1997	Georgia State (4)	2–0	Florida Atlantic	n/i	Jacksonville, FL	Darren McKune (Ga. State)
1998	Jacksonville (1)	3–2 (a.e.t.)	UCF	n/i	Jacksonville, FL	Mike Popovic (Jacksonville)
1999	Mercer (1)	2–0	Florida Atlantic	n/i	Jacksonville, FL	Neil Zarac (Mercer)
2000	Georgia State (5)	1–0	Mercer	Eakes Athletics Complex	Buies Creek, NC	Darren McKune (Ga. State)
2001	Mercer (2)	2–1	Jacksonville	Bear Field	Macon, GA	Neil Zarac (Mercer)
2002	UCF (1)	1–0	Stetson	n/i	Boca Raton, FL	Eric Vasquez (UCF)
2003	UCF (2)	3–1	Florida Atlantic	Bear Field	Macon, GA	Brian Malec (UCF)
2004	UCF (3)	1–0	Mercer	Bear Field	Macon, GA	John Sobczak (UCF)
2005	Stetson (1)	2–1	Campbell	Bear Field	Macon, GA	Alex Minton (Stetson)
2006	Gardner–Webb (1)	2–1 (a.e.t.)	Stetson	Spec Martin Stadium	DeLand, FL	Dirk Dittrich (Gardner–Webb)
2007	Campbell (1)	1–1 (5–4 p)	Jacksonville	Spec Martin Stadium	DeLand, FL	Vince Petrasso (Campbell)
2008	Jacksonville (2)	4–3	Campbell	Eakes Athletics Complex	Buies Creek, NC	Ramak Safi (Jacksonville)
2009	Stetson (2)	2–1	Mercer	Eakes Athletics Complex	Buies Creek, NC	Griffin Gilstrap (Stetson)
2010	East Tennessee State (1)	1–0 (a.e.t.)	Stetson	Summers-Taylor Stadium	Johnson City, TN	Itode Fubara (ETSU)
2011	Florida Gulf Coast (1)	1–0	East Tennessee State	Summers-Taylor Stadium	Johnson City, TN	Nathan Ingham (FGCU)
2012	Florida Gulf Coast (2)	1–0	Mercer	FGCU Soccer Complex	Fort Myers, FL	Santiago Echeverri (FGCU)
2013	East Tennessee State (2)	3–1	North Florida	FGCU Soccer Complex	Fort Myers, FL	Nate Hodges (ESTU)
2014	Florida Gulf Coast (3)	1–0	North Florida	Nashville, TN	Nathan Ingham (FGCU)	
2015	North Florida (1)	7–0	USC Upstate	Hodges Stadium	Jacksonville, FL	Helge Pietschmann (North Florida)
2016	Florida Gulf Coast (4)	3–2	Jacksonville	FGCU Soccer Complex	Fort Myers, FL	Albert Ruiz (FGCU)
2017	Lipscomb (1)	2–1	Jacksonville	Southern Oak Stadium	Jacksonville, FL	Ivan Sakou (Lipscomb)
2018	Lipscomb (2)	2–0	Stetson	Lipscomb Soccer Complex	Nashville, TN	Logan Paynter (Lipscomb)
2019	NJIT (1)	2–1	Florida Gulf Coast	J. Malcolm Simon Stadium	Newark, NJ	Regsan Watkins (NJIT)
2020	(no tournament held because of the COVID-19 pandemic in the United States)					
2021 (Apr.) (Note: The ASUN moved its originally scheduled fall 2020 season to spring 2021 due to COVID-19 issues. The conference tournament was officially branded as the "2021 Spring" edition.)	Jacksonville (2) (Note: For the rescheduled spring 2021 season only, the ASUN split into North and South Divisions, with regular-season standings based exclusively on results within the division. Jacksonville won the South Division.)	2–0	Florida Gulf Coast	Stetson Athletic Center	DeLand, FL (Note: The final, originally scheduled for April 17 at Jacksonville University's Southern Oak Stadium, was postponed to the following day due to unplayable field conditions and moved to the Stetson University campus.)	Connar Lufkin (Jacksonville)
2021 (Nov.)	Lipscomb (3)	4–1	Central Arkansas	Lipscomb Soccer Complex	Nashville, TN	Tyrese Spicer & Hayes Wood (Lipscomb)
2022	Lipscomb (4)	6–2	Central Arkansas	Lipscomb Soccer Complex	Nashville, TN	Hayes Wood (Lipscomb)
2023	Lipscomb (5)	1–0	Bellarmine	Lipscomb Soccer Complex	Nashville, TN	Javanne Smith (Lipscomb)
2024	North Florida (2)	3–3 (4–3 p)	Central Arkansas	Hodges Stadium	Jacksonville, FL	Joaquin Acuna (North Florida)
2025	North Florida (3)	3–2 (a.e.t.)	Bellarmine	Hodges Stadium	Jacksonville, FL	Anton Khelil (North Florida)
2026	North Florida (4)	2–0	Queens	Hodges Stadium	Jacksonville, FL	Anton Khelil (North Florida)

== Statistics ==
=== All-time champions ===
Key

- Teams in italic no longer member of the ASUN.
- ^{1} no longer sponsor men's soccer.

College	Titles	Last won	Runn.	Last lost
Georgia State	5	2000	4	1989
Lipscomb	5	2023	0	—N/a
Florida Gulf Coast	4	2016	2	2021
North Florida	4	2026	2	2014
Jacksonville	3	2021	4	2017
Houston Baptist	3	1985	2	1983
Centenary	3	1990	1	1987
UCF	3	2004	1	1998
Charleston	3	1996	0	—N/a
East Tennessee State	2	2013	1	2011
Hardin-Simmons	2	1980	1	1986
Mercer	2	2001	6	2012
Stetson	2	2009	4	2018
Campbell	1	2007	4	2008
FIU	1	1991	1	1994
Louisiana–Monroe^{1}	1	1981	1	1979
Gardner–Webb	1	2006	0	—N/a
NJIT	1	2019	0	—N/a
Central Arkansas	0	—N/a	3	2024
Florida Atlantic	0	—N/a	3	2003
Bellarmine	0	—N/a	2	2025
Georgia Southern	0	—N/a	2	1990
Queens	0	—N/a	1	2026
USC Upstate	0	—N/a	1	2015
