= 2023 ASUN men's soccer tournament =

- Classification: Division I
- Teams: 6
- Matches: 5
- Attendance: 1,869
- Site: Campus Sites
- Champions: Lipscomb (5th title)
- Winning coach: Charles Morrow (5th title)
- MVP: Javanne Smith (Lipscomb)
- Broadcast: ESPN+, YouTube

2023 ASUN Conference men's soccer standings
	Conf.					Overall
Team	W		L		T	W		L		T
Lipscomb ‡	6	–	1	–	0	10	–	4	–	4
Stetson	3	–	2	–	2	7	–	7	–	4
Bellarmine ^{#}	3	–	2	–	2	6	–	5	–	6
Jacksonville	2	–	2	–	3	5	–	9	–	3
Florida Gulf Coast	2	–	2	–	3	3	–	7	–	5
Central Arkansas	2	–	2	–	3	4	–	9	–	4
Queens ^{#}	3	–	4	–	0	5	–	10	–	2
North Florida	0	–	6	–	1	3	–	8	–	4
‡ – 2023 ASUN tournament champion + – At-large invitation to the 2023 NCAA tournament ^{#} – Ineligible for post-season (In transition); As of December 12, 2023; Rankings from United Soccer Coaches; Source: ASUN

The 2023 ASUN men's soccer tournament was the 45th edition of the postseason men's soccer tournament for the ASUN Conference, held from November 4 through November 11, 2023. All rounds of the tournament were hosted at the first and second seeds home stadiums, with the #1 seed Lipscomb, hosting the Final. The six-team single-elimination tournament consisted of three rounds based on seeding from regular season conference play. The Lipscomb Bison were the defending tournament champions, and were successful in defending their title, defeating second seed Bellarmine 1–0 in the Final. It was their fifth title in seven years, and fifth title in program history for Lipscomb and coach Charles Morrow. It also was the third title in a row for Lipscomb. As tournament champions, Lipscomb earned the ASUN's automatic berth into the 2023 NCAA Division I men's soccer tournament.

== Seeding ==
The top six teams in the regular season earned a spot in the tournament. Teams were seeded based on regular season conference record and tiebreakers were used to determine seedings of teams that finished with the same record. A tiebreaker was required to determine the second and third seeds for the tournament as Bellarmine and Stetson both finished with eleven conference points. Bellarmine defeated Stetson on October 28, and was therefore the second seed in the tournament. Four teams finished with nine conference points. After the tiebreakers, Queens was the fourth seed, Central Arkansas was the fifth seed, and Jacksonville was the sixth seed. Florida Gulf Coast was the fourth team to finish with nine conference points, and did not qualify for the tournament.

Seed	School	Conference Record	Points
1	Lipscomb	6–1–0	18
2	Bellarmine	3–2–2	11
3	Stetson	3–2–2	11
4	Queens	3–4–0	9
5	Central Arkansas	2–2–3	9
6	Jacksonville	2–2–3	9

== Bracket ==
First round Saturday, Nov. 4
4	Queens	0
5	Central Arkansas	1
3	Stetson	2
6	Jacksonville	0

Semifinals; Monday, Nov. 6
1	Lipscomb	4
5	Central Arkansas	0
2	Bellarmine (a.e.t.)	3
3	Stetson	2

Final; Saturday, Nov. 11
1	Lipscomb	1
2	Bellarmine	0

== Schedule ==
=== First Round ===
November 4	#3 Stetson	2–0	#6 Jacksonville	Louisville, KY
6:00 p.m. ET	Xavi Csato (yellow card) 44'; Alvaro Gabancho 77'; Afonso Conde 85'; Jacob Lenhard (yellow card) 88'	Report	(yellow card) 50' Mason Duval; (yellow card) 88' Daniel Wilkins; (yellow card) 90' Cole Reasonover	Stadium: Frazier Stadium; Attendance: 125; Referee: Noah Mantos; Assistant referees: Andrey Castel; Chad Collins; Fourth official: Don Cooper

November 4	#4 Queens	0–1	#5 Central Arkansas	Nashville, TN
6:00 p.m. CT	Samuel Idinge (yellow card) 26'; Gaston Moise (yellow card) 42'	Report	32' Deon Travis	Stadium: Lipscomb Soccer Complex; Attendance: 112; Referee: Adam Hadzic; Assistant referees: Logan Busby; Amir Torkamani; Fourth official: Matthew Bell

=== Semifinals ===
November 6	#2 Bellarmine	3–2 (a.e.t.)	#3 Stetson	Louisville, KY
7:00 p.m. ET	Alex Halevy 41', (yellow card) 83'; Jeffery Cox (yellow card) 51'; Chris Shust (yellow card) 71'; Brendan Schoemehl 84', 105' (pen.)	Report	4' Afonso Conde; 29', (yellow card) 51' Alvaro Gabancho; (yellow card) 42' Rafael Pinzon; (yellow card) 106' Luis Lara	Stadium: Frazier Stadium; Attendance: 500; Referee: Chico Grajeda; Assistant referees: Khary Williams; Sarah Pierce; Fourth official: Shawn Westerfield

November 6	#1 Lipscomb	4–0	#5 Central Arkansas	Nashville, TN
7:00 p.m. CT	Daniel Stampatori 27'; Tyrese Spicer (yellow card) 34'; Ploutarchos Alonefti 53', (yellow card) 59'; Javanne Smith 67', 80'; Carson Cooke (yellow card) 90'	Report	(yellow card) 15' (yellow-red card) 76' Pietro Fontana; (yellow card) 45' Team; (red card) 60' Tajio James; (yellow card) 60' Team	Stadium: Lipscomb Soccer Complex; Attendance: 461; Referee: Kevin Fikar; Assistant referees: Tim Stewart; Amir Torkamani; Fourth official: Adam Warner

=== Final ===
November 11	#1 Lipscomb	1–0	#2 Bellarmine	Nashville, TN
7:00 p.m. CT	Javanne Smith 40'; Juan Carlos Rodriguez (red card) 74'	Report	(yellow card) 63' Juan Ballas	Stadium: Lipscomb Soccer Complex; Attendance: 671; Referee: Amin Hadzic; Assistant referees: Amir Torkamani; Kris Fabrick; Fourth official: Jason Steiner

== Statistics ==
=== Goalscorers ===
There were 13 goals scored in 5 matches, for an average of 2.6 goals per match (as of November 11, 2023).

3 goals

- Javanne Smith – Lipscomb

2 goals

- Brendan Schoemehl – Bellarmine
- Afonso Conde – Stetson
- Alvaro Gabancho – Stetson

1 goal

- Alex Halevy – Bellarmine
- Deon Travis – Central Arkansas
- Ploutarchos Alonefti – Lipscomb
- Daniel Stampatori – Lipscomb

== All-Tournament team ==
Player	Team
Alex Halevy	Bellarmine
Brock Pope	Bellarmine
Brendan Schoemehl	Bellarmine
Jerry Gutierrez	Central Arkansas
Deon Travis	Central Arkansas
Nick Dang	Lipscomb
George Macready	Lipscomb
**Javanne Smith**	Lipscomb
Daniel Stampatori	Lipscomb
Afonso Conde	Stetson
Alvaro Gabancho	Stetson

MVP in bold
