= 2024 ASUN men's soccer tournament =

- Classification: Division I
- Teams: 6
- Matches: 5
- Attendance: 2,024
- Site: Campus Sites
- Champions: North Florida (2nd title)
- Winning coach: Jamie Davies (1st title)
- MVP: Joaquin Acuna (North Florida)
- Broadcast: ESPN+

2024 ASUN Conference men's soccer standings
	Conf.					Overall
Team	W		L		T	W		L		T
North Florida ‡	4	–	2	–	1	7	–	8	–	4
Stetson	3	–	0	–	4	4	–	6	–	6
Florida Gulf Coast	3	–	3	–	1	4	–	10	–	3
Central Arkansas	3	–	3	–	1	8	–	7	–	3
Queens ^{#}	2	–	2	–	3	5	–	10	–	3
Jacksonville	2	–	3	–	2	4	–	6	–	5
Bellarmine	2	–	3	–	2	5	–	6	–	5
Lipscomb	1	–	4	–	2	3	–	8	–	5
‡ – 2024 ASUN tournament champion + – At-large invitation to the 2024 NCAA tournament ^{#} – Ineligible for post-season (In transition); As of December 16, 2024; Rankings from United Soccer Coaches; Source: ASUN

The 2024 ASUN men's soccer tournament was the 46th edition of the postseason men's soccer tournament for the ASUN Conference, held from November 9 through November 16, 2024. All rounds of the tournament were hosted at the first and second seeds home stadiums, with the #1 seed Stetson, hosting the Final. The six-team single-elimination tournament consisted of three rounds based on seeding from regular season conference play. The Lipscomb Bison were the defending tournament champions, and were unsuccessful in defending their title, as they finished eighth during the conference regular season and did not qualify for the tournament. The North Florida Ospreys would go on to win the title, defeating Central Arkansas in a penalty shootout in the Final. The second title for the North Florida men's soccer program and the first under head coach Jamie Davies. As tournament champions, North Florida earned the ASUN's automatic berth into the 2024 NCAA Division I men's soccer tournament.

== Seeding ==
The top six teams in the regular season earned a spot in the tournament. Teams were seeded based on regular season conference record and tiebreakers were used to determine seedings of teams that finished with the same record. A tiebreaker was required to determine the first and second seeds after North Florida and Stetson both finished the regular season with thirteen points in conference play. Stetson defeated North Florida 2–1 on September 21, and therefore earned the first seed. A second tiebreaker was required to determine the third and fourth seeds as Central Arkansas and Florida Gulf Coast finished with identical 3–3–1 regular season records. Florida Gulf Coast defeated Central Arkansas 2–1 on October 25, to earn the third seed. A final tiebreaker was required for the sixth and final seed as Bellarmine and Jacksonville finished with identical 2–3–2 records during regular season play. Bellarmine defeated Jacksonville 2–1 on October 26 to earn the sixth seed.

Seed	School	Conference Record	Points
1	Stetson	3–0–4	13
2	North Florida	4–2–1	13
3	Florida Gulf Coast	3–3–1	10
4	Central Arkansas	3–3–1	10
5	Queens	2–2–3	9
6	Bellarmine	2–3–2	8

== Bracket ==
First round Saturday, Nov. 9
4	Central Arkansas	3
5	Queens	2
3	Florida Gulf Coast (pen.)	1 (5)
6	Bellarmine	1 (4)

Semifinals; Monday, Nov. 11
1	Stetson	0
4	Central Arkansas	3
2	North Florida	3
3	Florida Gulf Coast	0

Final; Saturday, Nov. 16
4	Central Arkansas	3 (3)
2	North Florida (pen.)	3 (4)

== Schedule ==
=== First Round ===
November 9, 2024	#4 Central Arkansas	3–2	#5 Queens	DeLand, FL
6:00 p.m. EST	Pietro Fontana 44'; Tajio James 77', 81'	Report	22' Cole Pumpian; 81' Rodrigo Canovas; (yellow card) 88' Roberto Alvarez	Stadium: Stetson Athletic Training Center; Attendance: 0 Referee: Richonne Clark; Assistant referees: Matt Osterhouse; Will Diaz Jr.

November 9, 2024	#3 Florida Gulf Coast	1–1 (a.e.t.) (5–4 p)	#6 Bellarmine	Jacksonville, FL
7:00 p.m. EST	Jose Escobar (yellow card) 39'; Victor Lopes (yellow card) 76'; Addrian Knights-Browne 89'; Shachar Nissim (yellow card) 89'	Report	54' (pen.) Austin Yowell	Stadium: Hodges Stadium; Attendance: 213; Referee: Mario Maric; Assistant referees: Thanas Bitro; Chris Chen; Fourth official: Velmir Vejzovic
	Penalties
	Lucas Sperner (penalty scored); Pablo Brimeux (penalty scored); Victor Lopes (penalty scored); Lucas Windschauer (penalty scored); Cao Chaves (penalty scored)		(penalty scored) Colin Elder; (penalty missed) Austin Yowell; (penalty scored) Cade Morgan; (penalty scored) Nore Summer; (penalty scored) Adric Rosato

=== Semifinals ===
November 11, 2024	#1 Stetson	0–3	#4 Central Arkansas	DeLand, FL
6:00 p.m. EST	Afonso Conde (yellow card) 54'; Maurice Hauser (yellow card) 84'	Report	(yellow card) 24' Josh Baros; (yellow card) 33', (goal) 45' Charles Brunet; 68' Devonte Richards; (yellow card) 76' Franco DiGiovanni; 76' Tajio James; (yellow card) 79' Pietro Fontana	Stadium: Stetson Athletic Training Center; Attendance: 369; Referee: Alejo Calume; Assistant referees: Lyubomir Sapundzhiev; Corbin Goodyear

November 11, 2024	#2 North Florida	3–0	#3 Florida Gulf Coast	Jacksonville, FL
7:00 p.m. EST	Joaquin Acuna 7', 27'; David Perez 54'; Alex Barnett (yellow card) 68'	Report	(yellow card) 69' Victor Lopes	Stadium: Hodges Stadium; Attendance: 461

=== Final ===
November 16, 2024	#2 North Florida	3–3 (a.e.t.) (4–3 p)	#4 Central Arkansas	Jacksonville, FL
7:00 p.m. EST	Anton Khelil 10'; David Perez 39', (yellow card) 85'; Joaquin Acuna 67', (yellow card) 75'; Team (yellow card) 72'; Tyler Prebenda (yellow card) 83'	Report	14', 22', 73' Devonte Richards; (yellow card) 53' Pharis Petrica	Stadium: Hodges Stadium; Attendance: 981; Referee: Elvis Osmanovic; Assistant referees: Kamil Sikora; Thanas Bitro; Fourth official: Mario Maric
	Penalties
	Anton Khelil (penalty scored); Tyler Prebenda (penalty scored); Rafa Rios (penalty scored); David Perez (penalty missed); Joaquin Acuna (penalty scored)		(penalty scored) Devonte Richards; (penalty scored) Pietro Fontana; (penalty missed) Yamato Fujishima; (penalty scored) Pharis Petrica; (penalty missed) Javier Ramirez

== Statistics ==
=== Goalscorers ===
There were 19 goals scored in 5 matches, for an average of 3.8 goals per match (as of November 16, 2024).

4 goals

- Devonte Richards – Central Arkansas

3 goals

- Joaquin Acuna – North Florida
- Tajio James – Central Arkansas

2 goals

- David Perez – North Florida

1 goal

- Charles Brunet – Central Arkansas
- Rodrigo Canovas – Queens
- Pietro Fontana – Central Arkansas
- Anton Khelil – North Florida
- Addrian Knights-Browne – Florida Gulf Coast
- Cole Pumpian – Queens
- Austin Yowell – Bellarmine

== All-Tournament team ==
Player	Team
Elijah Bishop	Central Arkansas
Pietro Fontana	Central Arkansas
Devonte Richards	Central Arkansas
Beltran Alvarez	Florida Gulf Coast
Victor Lopes	Florida Gulf Coast
**Joaquin Acuna**	North Florida
Anton Khelil	North Florida
David Perez	North Florida
Tyler Prebenda	North Florida
Charles Ahl	Stetson
Clarence Loriot	Stetson

MVP in bold
