= 2021 Spring ASUN men's soccer tournament =

2020–21 ASUN men's soccer tournament
- Classification: Division I
- Teams: 7
- Matches: 6
- Quarterfinals site: Campus sites
- Semifinals site: Southern Oak Stadium; Jacksonville, FL
- Finals site: Stetson Athletic Training Center; DeLand, FL
- Champions: Jacksonville (2nd title)
- Winning coach: Mauricio B. Ruiz (1st title)
- MVP: Connar Lufkin (Jacksonville)
- Broadcast: ESPN+, Facebook Live, YouTube TV

2020 ASUN Conference men's soccer standings
	Conf.					Overall
Team	W		L		T	W		L		T
North
Bellarmine ^{#}	3	–	1	–	0	4	–	4	–	0
Liberty	1	–	3	–	1	7	–	3	–	2
Lipscomb	1	–	2	–	1	6	–	5	–	2
South
Jacksonville ‡	4	–	2	–	0	7	–	4	–	2
North Florida	2	–	2	–	2	4	–	3	–	3
Florida Gulf Coast	2	–	2	–	2	3	–	4	–	4
Stetson	1	–	3	–	2	1	–	5	–	2
‡ – 2021 Spring ASUN Tournament champion + – Also invited to the 2020 NCAA tournament ^{#} – Ineligible for post-season (In transition); As of May 3, 2021; Rankings from United Soccer Coaches

The 2021 Spring ASUN men's soccer tournament was the 42nd edition of the ASUN Men's Soccer Tournament. It determined the ASUN Conference's automatic berth for the 2020 NCAA Division I men's soccer tournament. The tournament began on April 10, 2021, and concluded on April 18. The final had originally been scheduled for April 17, but the intended final site of Southern Oak Stadium on the Jacksonville University campus in Jacksonville, Florida was rendered unplayable due to severe weather. The match was delayed by a day and moved to the Stetson University campus in DeLand, Florida.

Due to COVID-19 issues, the NCAA moved the 2020–21 men's soccer championship from fall 2020 to spring 2021. Almost all Division I conferences, including the ASUN, moved their men's soccer seasons accordingly. The conference split into two divisions for that season only, with Bellarmine, Lipscomb, and Liberty in the North Division and Florida Gulf Coast, Jacksonville, North Florida, and Stetson in the South Division.

Jacksonville, the winner of the South Division, won the tournament for the second time, defeating Florida Gulf Coast 2–0 in the final. The Dolphins earned their sixth berth to the NCAA Tournament, losing in the first round to American on penalties after a 3–3 draw.

== Seeds ==
Seed	School	Conference	Tiebreaker
1N	Bellarmine	3–1–0	
1S	Jacksonville	4–2–0	
2N	Lipscomb	1–2–1	LIP 1–0–1 vs. LIB
2S	Florida Gulf Coast	2–2–2	FGCU 1–0–1 vs. UNF
3N	Liberty	1–2–1	
3S	North Florida	2–2–2	
4S	Stetson	1–3–2	

== Bracket ==
Quarterfinals; April 10
2S	Florida Gulf Coast (pen.)	1 (5)
3S	North Florida	1 (3)
1S	Jacksonville	3
4S	Stetson	0
2N	Lipscomb	2
3N	Liberty	0

Semifinals; April 15
1N	Bellarmine	1
2S	Florida Gulf Coast	2
1S	Jacksonville	4
2N	Lipscomb	2

Final; April 18
2S	Florida Gulf Coast	0
1S	Jacksonville	2

== Results ==
=== Quarterfinals ===
April 10
6:45 p.m. EDT

No. 4S Stetson	0–3	No. 1S Jacksonville
Wintermeier (yellow card) 24'; Vinasco (yellow card) 27'; DiLorenzo (yellow card) 35'; Scattergood (red card) 71'; Alram (yellow card) 71'; Norton (yellow card) 84'	Report	Johnson 16'; Araujo-Wilson (yellow card) 37'; Correa 45'; Manzo (yellow card) 47'; Davis 69'; Capellan (yellow card) 90'

Southern Oak Stadium
Jacksonville, FL
Attendance: 183
Referee: Jonathan Bilinski

April 10
7:00 p.m. EDT

No. 3S North Florida	1–1 (a.e.t.)	No. 2S FGCU
Brown (yellow card) 17'; TEAM (yellow card) 17'; Steigelman (yellow card) 49'; Board (yellow card) 56'; TEAM 59'; Nevorić (yellow card) 74'	Report	Becker (yellow card) 22'; Saunders (yellow card) 49'; Guichard (yellow card) 49'; Senior (red card) 81'; Dudley 87'
Penalties
Soronellas (penalty scored); Begley (penalty missed); Burka (penalty scored); Estes (penalty scored)	3–5	(penalty scored) Dudley; (penalty scored) Vasconcelos; (penalty scored) Da Paz; (penalty scored) Becker; (penalty scored) Veys

FGCU Soccer Complex
Fort Myers, FL
Attendance: 208
Referee: Jonathan Weiner

April 10
6:00 p.m. CDT

No. 3N Liberty	0–2	No. 2N Lipscomb
Clark (yellow card) 57'; Betts (yellow card) 83'	Report	Wood 56'; Kalala 84'; Smith (yellow card) 87'

Lipscomb Soccer Complex
Nashville, TN
Attendance: 352

=== Semifinals ===
April 15
4:00 p.m. EDT

No. 2S FGCU	2–1	No. 1N Bellarmine
Mullings 15'; McCloskey (yellow card) 52'; Hammond (yellow card) 60'; Saunders (yellow card) 62'; Edwards 85'	Report	Zed 8'; Williamson (yellow card) 52'; Dunne (yellow card) 67'

Southern Oak Stadium
Jacksonville, FL
Attendance: 77
Referee: Mark Kadlecik

April 15
7:00 p.m. EST

No. 2N Lipscomb	2–4	No. 1S Jacksonville
Turner 44'; Neuman (yellow card) 64'; Lopez (yellow card) 66' (goal) 79'; Robinson (yellow card) 79'; Gulden (yellow card) 85'; Wood (yellow card) 90'	Report	Johnson 6'; Ringstrand 8'; Correa 23'; Lufkin 61'; Reasonover (yellow card) 90'

Southern Oak Stadium
Jacksonville, FL
Attendance: 123
Referee: Sorin Stoica

=== Final ===
April 18
3:30 p.m. EDT

No. 2S FGCU	0–2	No. 1S Jacksonville
Becker (yellow card) 61'; Dudley (yellow card) 80'; Da Paz (yellow card) 90'	Report	Duncan-Smith (yellow card) 1'; Lufkin 60', 67'; Johnson (yellow card) 61'; Davis (yellow card) 65'; Moreira (yellow card) 73'

Stetson Athletic Training Center
DeLand, FL
Attendance: 50

== All Tournament Team ==
**2021 ASUN Spring Men's Soccer All-Tournament team**

**Connar Lufkin**, Jacksonville
Cao Chaves, Jacksonville
Olivier Correa, Jacksonville
Reed Davis, Jacksonville
Nil Ringstrand, Jacksonville
Ethan Dudley, FGCU
O'Vonte Mullings, FGCU
Gustavo Vasconcelos, FGCU
Noah Gulden, Lipscomb
William Turner, Lipscomb
LJ Estes, North Florida

MVP in **Bold**
