= Atlantic Sun Tournament =

Atlantic Sun Tournament may refer to the championship of any sport sponsored by the ASUN Conference (formerly Atlantic Sun Conference) including the following:

- ASUN men's basketball tournament
- ASUN Men's Soccer Tournament
- ASUN Conference baseball tournament
- ASUN women's basketball tournament
