= 2020 West Coast Conference men's soccer season =

- League: NCAA Division I
- Sport: Soccer
- Duration: February 28 – April 11, 2021
- Teams: 10

2021 MLS SuperDraft

Regular Season
- Season champions: Portland
- Runners-up: Pacific

West Coast Conference men's soccer seasons
- ← 2019 2021 →

2020 West Coast Conference men's soccer standings
| | Conf. | | | | | Overall |
| Team | W | | L | | T | W | | L | | T |
|---|---|---|---|---|---|---|---|---|---|---|
| No. 17Loyola Marymount† | 5 | – | 0 | – | 2 | 6 | – | 0 | – | 3 |
| Saint Mary's | 4 | – | 2 | – | 1 | 6 | – | 2 | – | 1 |
| Santa Clara | 4 | – | 3 | – | 0 | 4 | – | 4 | – | 0 |
| San Francisco | 3 | – | 2 | – | 2 | 4 | – | 4 | – | 2 |
| San Diego | 3 | – | 2 | – | 2 | 3 | – | 3 | – | 2 |
| Portland | 1 | – | 3 | – | 3 | 2 | – | 4 | – | 3 |
| Pacific | 2 | – | 4 | – | 0 | 2 | – | 7 | – | 0 |
| Gonzaga | 0 | – | 6 | – | 0 | 2 | – | 9 | – | 0 |
† – Conference champion + – Also invited to the 2020 NCAA tournament; As of May 28, 2021; Rankings from United Soccer Coaches

The 2020 West Coast Conference men's soccer season is the 33rd season of men's varsity soccer in the conference. The season, originally scheduled to begin on August 30, 2020, and conclude on November 6, 2020, was postponed to spring 2021 due to the COVID-19 pandemic. Consequently, the season will begin on February 3, 2021, and conclude on April 11, 2021. The first set of conference games are scheduled for February 28, 2021.

The defending champions are the Saint Mary's Gaels who won the regular season last year (the conference does not host a tournament).

== Previous season ==
The 2019 season began on August 29, 2019, and concluded on November 12, 2019. Saint Mary's won the regular season, and earned the conference's automatic berth into the NCAA Tournament. Loyola Marymount, the WCC runners-up, earned an at-large bid into the tournament. Saint Mary's earned a first-round bye, and was seeded 12th-overall in the tournament while Loyola Marymount entered in the first round. Loyola Marymount hosted Seattle in the first round and lost 1–3. Saint Mary's hosted UCSB in the second round and lost 0–4.

Anders Engebretsen and Miguel Berry were named Co-Players of the Year for the conference. Filippo Zattarin won the Defensive Player of the Year Award. Remi Prieur was named Goalkeeper of the Year; Noel Caliskan was named Rookie of the Year, and finally, Adam Cooper was named Coach of the Year.

Miguel Berry was selected by Columbus Crew with the 7th overall pick in the 2020 MLS SuperDraft. Chicago Fire drafted Jonathan Jimenez in the first round with the 26th overall pick. Rey Ortiz, Remi Prieur, and Anders Engebretsen were drafted in the Draft.

== Teams ==
=== Stadiums and locations ===
| Team | Location | Stadium | Capacity |
|---|---|---|---|
| Gonzaga Bulldogs | Spokane, Washington | Gonzaga Soccer Field | 1,500 |
| Loyola Marymount Lions | Los Angeles, California | Sullivan Field | 2,000 |
| Portland Pilots | Portland, Oregon | Merlo Field | 5,120 |
| Saint Mary's Gaels | Moraga, California | Saint Mary's Stadium | 4,500 |
| San Diego Toreros | San Diego, California | Torero Stadium | 6,000 |
| San Francisco Dons | San Francisco, California | Negoesco Stadium | 3,000 |
| Santa Clara Broncos | Santa Clara, California | Stevens Stadium | 7,000 |

=== Head coaches ===
As of the 2019 season

| Team | Head coach | Previous job | Years at school | Overall record | Record at school | WCC record | NCAA Tournaments | NCAA College Cups | NCAA Titles | Ref. |

== Preseason ==
=== WCC Media Poll ===
To be announced.

=== All-WCC Preseason Team ===
To be announced.

== Regular season ==
=== Weekly results ===
Legend

Index to colors and formatting
WCC member won
WCC member lost
WCC member tied
WCC teams in **bold**

All times Eastern time.

==== Week 1 (Feb. 3 – Feb. 7) ====
To be determined.

==== Week 2 (Feb. 8 – Feb. 14) ====
To be determined.

==== Week 3 (Feb. 15 – Feb. 21) ====
To be determined.

==== Week 4 (Feb. 22 – Feb. 28) ====
To be determined.

==== Week 5 (Mar. 1 – Mar. 7) ====
To be determined.

==== Week 6 (Mar. 8 – Mar. 14) ====
To be determined.

==== Week 7 (Mar. 15 – Mar. 21) ====
To be determined.

==== Week 8 (Mar. 22 – Mar. 28) ====
To be determined.

==== Week 9 (Mar. 29 – Apr. 4) ====
To be determined.

==== Week 10 (Apr. 5 – Apr. 11) ====
To be determined.

=== Rankings ===
==== National ====
Legend
| Increase in ranking |
| Decrease in ranking |
| Not ranked previous week |

| | | Pre | Wk 1 | Wk 2 | Wk 3 | Wk 4 | Wk 5 | Wk 6 | Wk 7 | Wk 8 | Wk 9 | Wk 10 | Wk 11 | Wk 12 | Final |
|---|---|---|---|---|---|---|---|---|---|---|---|---|---|---|---|
| Gonzaga | C | | | | | | | | | | | | | | |
| Loyola Marymount | C | | | | | | | | | | | | | | |
| Pacific | C | | | | | | | | | | | | | | |
| Portland | C | | | | | | | | | | | | | | |
| Saint Mary's | C | | | | | | | | | | | | | | |
| San Diego | C | | | | | | | | | | | | | | |
| San Francisco | C | | | | | | | | | | | | | | |
| Santa Clara | C | | | | | | | | | | | | | | |

==== Far West Regional ====
Legend
| Increase in ranking |
| Decrease in ranking |
| Not ranked previous week |

| | | Wk 1 | Wk 2 | Wk 3 | Wk 4 | Wk 5 | Wk 6 | Wk 7 | Wk 8 | Wk 9 | Wk 10 | Wk 11 | Wk 12 |
|---|---|---|---|---|---|---|---|---|---|---|---|---|---|
| Gonzaga | C | | | | | | | | | | | | |
| Loyola Marymount | C | | | | | | | | | | | | |
| Pacific | C | | | | | | | | | | | | |
| Portland | C | | | | | | | | | | | | |
| Saint Mary's | C | | | | | | | | | | | | |
| San Diego | C | | | | | | | | | | | | |
| San Francisco | C | | | | | | | | | | | | |
| Santa Clara | C | | | | | | | | | | | | |

== Postseason ==
=== NCAA Tournament ===
The WCC regular season winner will qualify for the NCAA Tournament. Other teams can still earn an at-large bid into the tournament.

=== Postseason awards and honors ===
2020 WCC Men's Soccer Individual Awards
| Award | Recipient(s) |
| Player of the Year | |
| Defensive Player of the Year | |
| Goalkeeper of the Year | |
| Co-Coaches of the Year | |
| Freshman of the Year | |

2020 WCC Men's Soccer All-Conference Teams
| First Team | Second Team | Freshman Team |

== 2021 MLS Draft ==
The 2021 MLS SuperDraft was held on January 21, 2021. No players from the WCC were selected in the draft.

== Homegrown players ==
The Homegrown Player Rule is a Major League Soccer program that allows MLS teams to sign local players from their own development academies directly to MLS first team rosters. Before the creation of the rule in 2008, every player entering Major League Soccer had to be assigned through one of the existing MLS player allocation processes, such as the MLS SuperDraft.

To place a player on its homegrown player list, making him eligible to sign as a homegrown player, players must have resided in that club's home territory and participated in the club's youth development system for at least one year. Players can play college soccer and still be eligible to sign a homegrown contract.
