= 2020 Patriot League men's soccer season =

- League: NCAA Division I
- Sport: Soccer
- Duration: Fall season: September 17 – October 30, 2020; Spring season: February 3 – April 17, 2021
- Teams: 8

2021 MLS SuperDraft

Regular Season

Tournament

Patriot League men's soccer seasons
- ← 2019 2021 →

2020 Patriot League men's soccer standings
	Conf.					Overall
Team	W		L		T	W		L		T
North
Lafayette	4	–	0	–	0	7	–	1	–	0
Holy Cross	2	–	1	–	0	2	–	2	–	0
Boston University	1	–	2	–	1	1	–	2	–	1
Colgate	1	–	2	–	0	1	–	3	–	1
Army	0	–	3	–	1	0	–	3	–	1
South
Loyola (MD)	3	–	1	–	1	3	–	2	–	1
American ‡	2	–	1	–	2	4	–	2	–	3
Navy	2	–	1	–	1	4	–	2	–	1
Bucknell	1	–	3	–	0	1	–	4	–	1
Lehigh	1	–	4	–	0	1	–	4	–	0
As of May 28, 2021

The 2020 Patriot League men's soccer season is the 31st season of men's varsity soccer in the conference. The season was slated to begin on August 29, 2020 and conclude on November 14, 2020. Due to the ongoing COVID-19 pandemic, the season was postponed to begin on February 3, 2021, and conclude on April 17, 2021.

Despite the delay, Army and Navy will be playing competitive fixtures during the fall season.

== Fall 2020 season ==
=== Fall matches ===
The two service academies in the conference, Army and Navy, played competitive matches during the fall.

Index to colors and formatting
PL member won
PL member lost
PL member tied
SoCon teams in **bold**

All times Eastern time.

Date	Time (ET)	Visiting team	Home team	Site	Result	Attendance
September 26	6:00 p.m.	**Army**	Merchant Marine	Brooks Stadium • Kings Point, NY	**W** 1–0	275
October 3	7:00 p.m.	Merchant Marine	**Army**	James Clinton Field • West Point, NY	**W** 4–0	324
October 18	7:00 p.m.	**Navy**	NC State	Dail Soccer Field • Raleigh, NC	**W** 2–1	70

=== Rankings ===
==== United Soccer Coaches ====
During the fall 2020 season, United Soccer Coaches ran a Top 5 poll for the programs playing in fall.

	Improvement in ranking
	Drop in ranking
RV	Received votes but were not ranked in Top 5
NV	No votes received

	Wk 1	Wk 2	Wk 3	Wk 4	Wk 5	Wk 6	Wk 7	Wk 8	Wk 9	Wk 10	Wk 11	Wk 12
Army	NV	NV	NV	NV	NV	NV	NV	NV	NV			
Navy	NV	NV	NV	NV	NV	NV	NV	NV	NV			

==== TopDrawerSoccer.com ====
During the fall 2020 season, United Soccer Coaches ran a Top 10 poll for the programs playing in fall.

	Improvement in ranking
	Drop in ranking
RV	Received votes but were not ranked in Top 10
NV	No votes received

	Wk 1	Wk 2	Wk 3	Wk 4	Wk 5	Wk 6	Wk 7	Wk 8	Wk 9	Wk 10	Wk 11	Wk 12
Army	NV											
Navy	NV											

=== Awards and honors ===
Date	Player	Position	School	Honor	Ref.

== Spring 2021 season ==
The Spring season will begin on February 27, 2021 and conclude on April 10, 2021. Teams will be divided into the North and South Division for the season to minimize travel due to the pandemic.

=== Preseason poll ===
The preseason poll will be released in December 2020 or January 2021.

	Team ranking	Points	First place votes
1.			
2.			
3.			
4.			
5.			
6.			
7.			

=== Preseason national polls ===
The preseason national polls were originally to be released in July and August 2020. Only CollegeSoccerNews.com released a preseason poll for 2020.

	United; Soccer	CSN	Soccer; America	Top Drawer; Soccer
American	—	—	—	—
Army	—	—	—	—
Boston U	—	—	—	—
Bucknell	—	—	—	—
Colgate	—	—	—	—
Holy Cross	—	—	—	—
Lafayette	—	—	—	—
Lehigh	—	—	—	—
Navy	—	—	—	—

=== Early season tournaments ===
Early season tournaments will be announced in late Fall 2020 and winter 2021.

Team	Tournament	Finish

=== Results ===
Index to colors and formatting
SoCon member won
SoCon member lost
SoCon member tied
SoCon teams in **bold**

All times Eastern time.† denotes Homecoming game

=== Rankings ===
==== National rankings ====
	Improvement in ranking
	Drop in ranking
RV	Received votes but were not ranked in Top 25
NV	No votes received

		Pre	Wk 1	Wk 2	Wk 3	Wk 4	Wk 5	Wk 6	Wk 7	Wk 8	Wk 9	Wk 10	Wk 11	Wk 12	Wk 13	Wk 14	Wk 15	Wk 16	Final
American	USC														None released				
American	TDS																		
Army	USC														None released				
Army	TDS																		
Boston U	USC														None released				
Boston U	TDS																		
Bucknell	USC														None released				
Bucknell	TDS																		
Colgate	USC														None released				
Colgate	TDS																		
Holy Cross	USC														None released				
Holy Cross	TDS																		
Lafayette	USC														None released				
Lafayette	TDS																		
Lehigh	USC														None released				
Lehigh	TDS																		
Navy	USC														None released				
Navy	TDS																		

==== Regional rankings - South Region ====
	Improvement in ranking
	Drop in ranking
RV	Received votes but were not ranked in Top 10
NV	No votes received

The United Soccer Coaches' south region ranks teams among the ACC, Atlantic Sun, and SoCon.

	Wk 1	Wk 2	Wk 3	Wk 4	Wk 5	Wk 6	Wk 7	Wk 8	Wk 9	Wk 10	Wk 11	Wk 12
American												
Army												
Boston U												
Bucknell												
Colgate												
Holy Cross												
Lafayette												
Lehigh												
Navy												

=== Players of the Week ===
Week	Offensive			Defensive			Ref.
Week	Player	Position	Team	Player	Position	Team	Ref.

== MLS SuperDraft ==
The MLS SuperDraft was held on January 21, 2021 and was held virtually through its website. No players from the Patriot League were selected in the draft.
