= Sékou Soumah =

Guinean footballer

Personal information
- Date of birth: 18 August 1974 (age 52)
- Position: Midfielder

Senior career*
Years	Team	Apps	(Gls)
1992–1995	Willem II	12	(2)

International career
1994	Guinea	2	(0)
- * Club domestic league appearances and goals

Sékou Soumah (born 18 August 1974) is a Guinean footballer who played as a midfielder. He played in two matches for the Guinea national football team in 1994. He was also named in Guinea's squad for the 1994 African Cup of Nations tournament.
