= 2020 CAA men's soccer tournament =

- Classification: Division I
- Teams: 4
- Matches: 3
- Site: Vidas Athletic Complex; Philadelphia, Pennsylvania
- Champions: James Madison (8th title)
- Winning coach: Paul Zazenski (3rd title)
- Broadcast: FloSports

2020 Colonial Athletic Association men's soccer standings
	Conf.					Overall
Team	W		L		T	W		L		T
North
Hofstra	2	–	0	–	2	5	–	2	–	3
Drexel	2	–	1	–	1	6	–	3	–	2
Delaware	1	–	1	–	2	2	–	1	–	2
Northeastern	0	–	3	–	1	0	–	5	–	1
South
No. 21 James Madison ‡	4	–	0	–	0	5	–	2	–	3
UNC Wilmington	2	–	1	–	1	5	–	3	–	2
Elon	2	–	2	–	0	3	–	5	–	0
William & Mary	1	–	3	–	0	2	–	4	–	0
Charleston	0	–	3	–	1	1	–	5	–	3
‡ – 2020 CAA Tournament champion + – Also invited to the 2020 NCAA Tournament; As of May 28, 2021; Rankings from United Soccer Coaches

The 2020 CAA men's soccer tournament was the postseason men's soccer tournament for the Colonial Athletic Association held from April 15 through April 17, 2021. The tournament was held at Vidas Athletic Complex in Philadelphia, PA. The four-team single-elimination tournament consisted of two rounds based on seeding from regular season conference play. James Madison repeated as champions, defeating Hofstra 4–3 in a penalty shootout following a 0–0 draw after 110 minutes. As tournament champions, James Madison earned the CAA's automatic berth into the 2020 NCAA Division I men's soccer tournament.

== Seeding ==
Seed	School	Conference Record	Points
N1	Hofstra	2–0–2	8
S1	James Madison	4–0–0	12
N2	Drexel	2–1–1	7
S2	UNC Wilmington	2–1–1	7

== Bracket ==
Semifinals; April 15, 2021
N1	Hofstra	4
S2	UNC Wilmington	2
S1	James Madison	1 (8)
N2	Drexel	1 (7)

Final; April 17, 2021
N1	Hofstra	0 (3)
S1	James Madison	0 (4)

== Schedule ==
=== Semifinals ===
April 15, 2021	#S1 James Madison	1–1 (a.e.t.) (8–7 p)	#N2 Drexel	Philadelphia, PA
	Axel Ahlander 22'		15' Chris Donovan; (yellow card) 50' Laolu Daranijo; (yellow card) 98' Patrick Murphy; (yellow card) 106' Kyle Tucker	Stadium: Vidas Athletic Complex; Referee: David Breckner; Assistant referees: Nicholas Zegestowsky; Luis Arroyo; Fourth official: Inga Maric
	Penalties
	Axel Ahlander (penalty scored)		Penalty missed Penalty scored

April 15, 2021	#N1 Hofstra	4–2	#S2 UNC Wilmington	Philadelphia, PA
	George O'Malley 3'; Luca Tausch (yellow card) 18'; Hendrik Hebbeker 19'; Storm Strongin 27'; George O'Malley (yellow card) 39'; Angel Chinchilla (yellow card) 87'; Matthew Vowinkel 88'		(yellow card) 68' Ryan Graham; 69' Parker Norris; 72' Jacob Evans	Stadium: Vidas Athletic Complex; Referee: Michael McBride; Assistant referees: Jerry Werel; Phil Benson; Fourth official: John Barr

=== Final ===
April 17, 2021	#N1 Hofstra	0–0 (3–4 p)	#S1 James Madison	Philadelphia, PA
	Tyler Clegg (yellow card)		(yellow card) 76' (red card) 76' Coach; (yellow card) 89' Ryan Carmichael	Stadium: Vidas Athletic Complex; Referee: John McCloskey; Assistant referees: Jay Hutchinson; Timothy John Shaw; Fourth official: Michael Weber
	Penalties
	Jack Nutall (penalty scored); Hendrik Hebbeker (penalty missed); Stefan Mason (penalty scored); Storm Strongin (penalty scored); Ryan Carmichael (penalty missed)		(penalty scored) Alex Krakowiak; (penalty scored) Rodrigo Robles; (penalty scored) Tyler Clegg; (penalty scored) Luca Erhardt; (penalty missed) Steve Foss
