= Wildcat Stadium (University of New Hampshire) =

Stadium at the University of New Hampshire

- The Dungeon
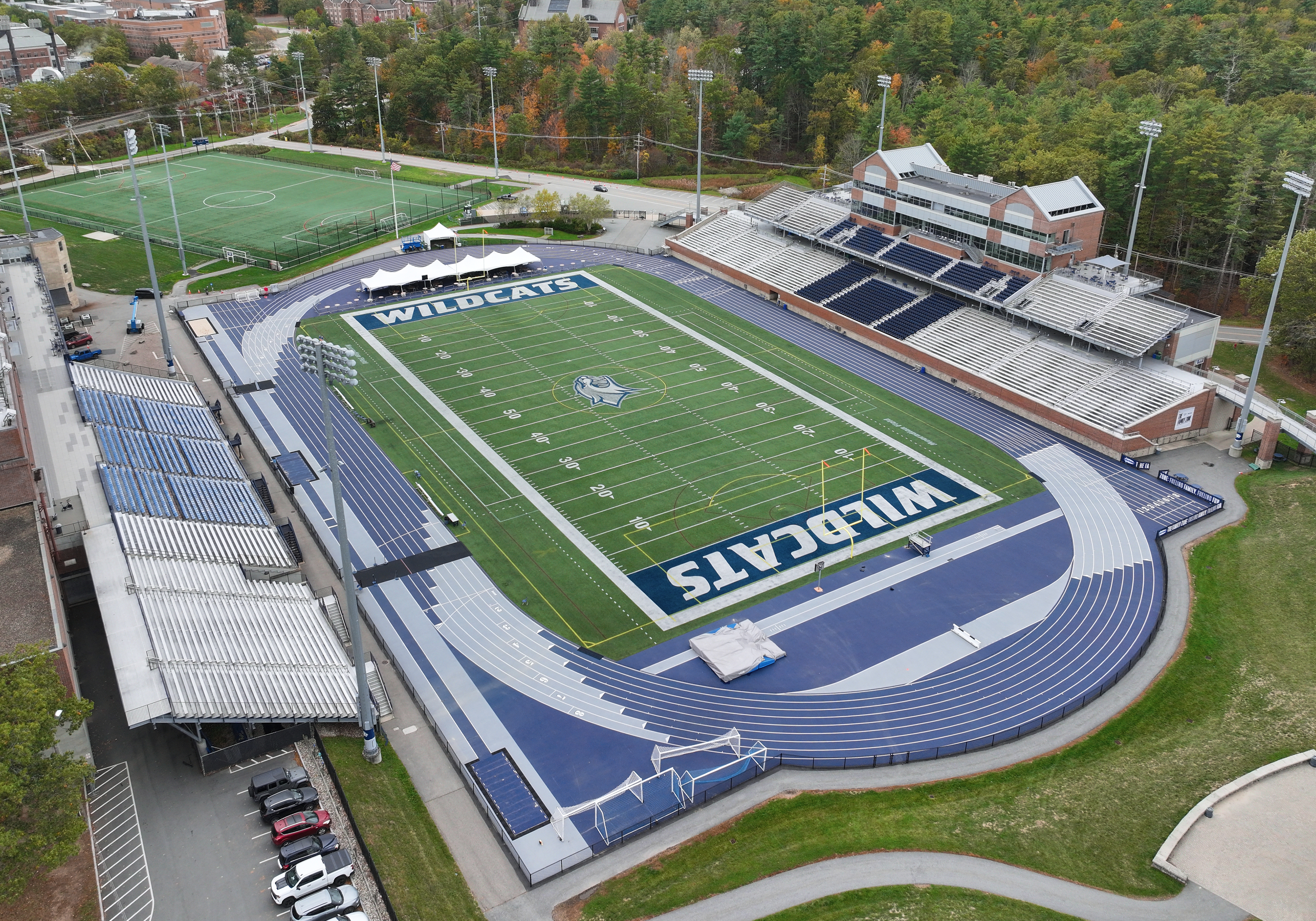
- Aerial view of the stadium in 2025
- Interactive map of Wildcat Stadium
- Former names: Lewis Field (1936–1951); Cowell Stadium (1952–2015)
- Address: 145 Main Street; Durham, NH; United States
- Coordinates: 43°08′19″N 70°56′23″W
- Owner: University of New Hampshire
- Operator: UNH Athletics
- Capacity: 11,015 (2016–present); 6,500 (1936–2015)
- Type: Stadium
- Surface: FieldTurf
- Current use: Football

Construction
- Groundbreaking: December 1933
- Opened: September 26, 1936; 90 years ago (Note: Refers to the date of first game. The stadium was dedicated on October 10, 1936.)
- Expanded: 2015–2016
- Cost: $25 million (expansion)

Tenant
- New Hampshire Wildcats football (NCAA)

Website
- unhwildcats.com/wildcatstadium

Wildcat Stadium is an 11,015-seat open-air multi-purpose stadium in Durham, New Hampshire, on the campus of the University of New Hampshire (UNH). It is home to the New Hampshire Wildcats football, soccer, lacrosse and track and field varsity teams. The stadium, which runs west-northwest, consists of a FieldTurf playing surface surrounded by a 400-metre track. On either side of the track are aluminum stands (the larger home stands being on northeast side). The stadium lies just southwest of the Field House, which houses Lundholm Gym as well as Swazey Pool and the Jerry Azumah Performance Center.

The stadium is a part of the main athletics area of campus, south of Main Street and west of the railroad tracks. It replaced Memorial Field, which has since been remodeled for use by women's field hockey, and lies diagonally across Main Street beside the Whittemore Center. The track and field facility surrounding the field is named after Reggie F. Atkins, UNH class of 1928, a star student athlete who in later life donated the funds to start building the facility.

== History ==
The stadium was dedicated on October 10, 1936, with a football rivalry game against the Maine Black Bears. The first football game played in the stadium was actually held two weeks earlier, on September 26, 1936, against Lowell Textile Institute (now University of Massachusetts Lowell). The university's athletic facilities were originally named Lewis Fields after former university president Edward M. Lewis, with the football stadium referred to as Lewis Stadium or simply "Lewis Field".

In 1952, the stadium was formally named "Cowell Stadium" in honor of former football coach and athletic director William H. "Butch" Cowell. The field itself is "Mooradian Field", named in 1994 to honor Andy Mooradian, a longtime UNH professor, coach, and athletic director.

Lighting for night games was installed prior to the 2014 season, and the Wildcats hosted their first night game on September 27, 2014, recording a 52–19 victory over Dartmouth. The stadium went through major renovations following the 2015 season, in the months leading up to the 2016 season. Plans called for a new seating section on the eastern end zone side, which included new restrooms, concession, and press box. It also called for restoration of the western end zone seats. Renamed as "Wildcat Stadium", the facility hosted its first game under that name on September 10, 2016, with the Wildcats defeating Holy Cross by a score of 39–28.

The stadium also hosted soccer matches organised by the America East Conference, the women's tournament in 2007 and the men's tournament in 2020, limited to four teams and with restricted attendance during the COVID-19 pandemic.

The stadium hosted most spring graduation ceremonies for the university from 1948 through 2021. Exceptions included 2006, when ceremonies were moved indoors due to rain and flooding. Notable commencement speakers included then-vice president George H. W. Bush in May 1987. Bush returned in May 2007 along with Bill Clinton, with both ex-presidents serving as commencement speakers at the stadium. In September 2021, the university announced that future graduation ceremonies would be held indoors at the Whittemore Center, in a restructured manner.

=== Scoreboard controversy ===
Following renovations to the facility completed for the 2016 season, the university received criticism for its decision to use a quarter of a $4 million bequest for a video scoreboard at the new $25 million stadium. The donation was made by longtime university librarian and alumnus Robert Morin. The $4 million bequest was largely unrestricted with only $100,000 being required to be spent on the library. $2.5 million of the donation was used to fund an expanded career center. The university responded to this criticism by explaining that Morin was a football fan by the end of his life and detailing his following of the football team late in his life; however, internal documents showed after-the-fact that this assertion was a post-hoc spin. Regardless, many thought it should have been spent otherwise.

== See also ==
- List of NCAA Division I FCS football stadiums
- Ownby Stadium, a former football stadium in Dallas, also the source of some controversy over how donated funds were spent
