= Tor Saunders =

American soccer player (born 1998)

Personal information
- Date of birth: April 30, 1998 (age 28)
- Place of birth: Spokane, Washington, United States
- Height: 1.96 m (6 ft 5 in)
- Position: Goalkeeper

Youth career
- –2012: Crossfire Premier
- 2013–2016: Seattle Sounders FC

College career
Years	Team	Apps	(Gls)
2016–2019	Akron Zips	18	(0)
2020–2021	Coastal Carolina Chanticleers	15	(0)

Senior career*
Years	Team	Apps	(Gls)
2017	Seattle Sounders FC U-23	2	(0)
2019	South Georgia Tormenta 2	5	(0)
2021	Nashville SC	0	(0)
2022	Indy Eleven	0	(0)
2022	→ Chattanooga Red Wolves (loan)	5	(0)
2023	North Carolina FC	2	(0)
- * Club domestic league appearances and goals as of October 17, 2023

Tor Saunders (born April 30, 1998) is an American soccer player who plays as a goalkeeper.

== Career ==
=== Youth ===
Saunders attended Glacier Peak High School in Snohomish, Washington, also playing with the Seattle Sounders FC academy from 2013 to 2016. Prior to playing with the Sounders academy, Saunders was with Crossfire Premier.

=== College & amateur ===
In 2016, Saunders attended University of Akron to play college soccer. In three seasons with the Zips, Saunders made 18 appearances. He also earned Academic All-MAC accolades in 2018 and 2019. In 2020, Saunders transferred to Coastal Carolina University, where he went on to make 15 appearances across the 2020–21 season. Saunders season with Coastal Carolina saw him earn All-Sun Belt honors along with the Sun Belt Newcomer of the Year award, Senior CLASS Award First-Team All-American, Sun Belt Conference Championship Most Outstanding Player, and was named to the 2021 MAC Hermann Trophy watchlist.

While at college, Saunders also played in the USL League Two with Seattle Sounders FC U-23 in 2017, and South Georgia Tormenta 2 in 2019.

=== Professional ===
==== Nashville SC ====
On January 21, 2021, Saunders was selected 74th overall in the 2021 MLS SuperDraft by Nashville SC. He officially signed with the Major League Soccer team on June 17, 2021. Saunders was released by Nashville following the 2021 MLS season.

=== Indy Eleven ===
On March 4, 2022, Saunders signed with USL Championship club Indy Eleven. The same day he was loaned to USL League One's Chattanooga Red Wolves for the 2022 season. He made his professional debut on April 2, 2022, starting in a 1–1 draw with Forward Madison FC. He was released by Indy Eleven on November 30, 2022, following the conclusion of the 2022 season.

=== North Carolina FC ===
Saunders signed with USL League One side North Carolina FC on January 19, 2023.
