= 2020 America East men's soccer tournament =

- Classification: Division I
- Teams: 4
- Matches: 3
- Attendance: 404
- Site: Wildcat Stadium; Durham, New Hampshire
- Champions: New Hampshire (3rd title)
- Winning coach: Marc Hubbard (3rd title)
- Broadcast: AETV, ESPN+

2020 America East Conference men's soccer standings
	Conf.					Overall
Team	W		L		T	W		L		T
Pod A
No. 19 New Hampshire ‡	5	–	0	–	1	8	–	1	–	1
Vermont	4	–	1	–	1	5	–	2	–	1
UMass Lowell	1	–	4	–	1	1	–	6	–	1
Pod B
Hartford	3	–	2	–	1	3	–	3	–	1
Binghamton	2	–	4	–	0	2	–	4	–	0
Albany	2	–	4	–	0	3	–	5	–	1
Pod C
NJIT	4	–	2	–	0	4	–	5	–	1
UMBC	2	–	3	–	1	3	–	4	–	1
Stony Brook	1	–	4	–	1	1	–	6	–	1
‡ – 2020 Am. East Tournament champion + – Also invited to the 2020 NCAA tournament; As of May 28, 2021; Rankings from United Soccer Coaches; Note: Due to COVID-19, the NCAA suspended the 2020 men's soccer season for fall

The 2020 America East men's soccer tournament was the 32nd edition of the tournament. The tournament decided the America East Conference champion and guaranteed representative into the 2020 NCAA Division I men's soccer tournament.

== Background ==
The 2020 America East Men's Soccer Tournament was originally to be played in November 2020. However, the America East Conference postponed all fall sports with the hope to play them in the spring.

== Format ==
The American East Tournament was contested by the three pod winners plus one wild card.

== Qualified teams ==
Seed	Team	Conference record	Notes
1	New Hampshire	5-0-1	Pod A winners
2	Vermont	4-1-1	
3	NJIT	4-2-0	Pod C winners
4	Hartford	3-2-1	Pod B winners

== Bracket ==
Semifinals; April 15
1	New Hampshire	2
4	Hartford	0
3	NJIT	0
2	Vermont	1

Final; April 17
1	New Hampshire	2
2	Vermont	0

== Matches ==
=== Semifinals ===
April 15, 2021
2:00 p.m. ET

New Hampshire	2–0	Hartford
Menudier 43', 47'	Report

Wildcat Stadium, Durham, New Hampshire
Attendance: 126
Referee: Sam Mokalled

April 15, 2021
7:00 p.m. ET

Vermont	1–0	NJIT
Nagy 8'	Report

Wildcat Stadium, Durham, New Hampshire
Attendance: 0
Referee: Carlos Frenandes

=== Final ===
April 17, 2021
4:00 p.m. ET

New Hampshire	2–0	Vermont
Chris Pinkham 42'; Victor Menudier 76'	Report

Wildcat Stadium, Durham, New Hampshire
Attendance: 278
