= Jacksonville Dolphins men's soccer =

American college soccer team

- Founded: 1957; 69 years ago
- University: Jacksonville University
- Head coach: Ali Simmons (1st season)
- Conference: ASUN
- Location: Jacksonville, Florida, US
- Stadium: Southern Oak Stadium (capacity: 500)
- Nickname: Dolphins
- Colors: Green and white
Home	Away

NCAA tournament Round of 16
- 1998

NCAA tournament Round of 32
- 1998

NCAA tournament appearances
- 1987, 1995, 1996, 1998, 2008, 2020

Conference tournament championships
- 1987, 1995, 1996, 1998, 2008, 2020

Conference Regular Season championships
- 1959, 1999, 2007, 2020

The Jacksonville University Men's Soccer Team is a varsity intercollegiate athletic team of Jacksonville University in Jacksonville, Florida, United States. The team is a member of the ASUN Conference, which is part of the National Collegiate Athletic Association's Division I. Jacksonville's first men's soccer team was fielded in 1957. The team plays its home games at Southern Oak Stadium. The Dolphins are coached by Ali Simmons, who enters his first season in 2023.

The Dolphins have been in several NCAA conferences over their 60-year history. In 1959, the Dolphins won the Florida Intercollegiate Conference. The Dolphins have won three Sun Belt Conference Men's Soccer Tournaments, with one coming in 1987 and the other two coming from 1995–1996. The Dolphins won the ASUN Tournament in 2008 and spring 2021 (part of the rescheduled 2020 season). The Dolphins' best performance in NCAA Division I Men's Soccer Championship came in 1998, where they reached the round of 16.

== Roster ==
As of 1 Oct 2024

Note: Flags indicate national team as defined under FIFA eligibility rules; some limited exceptions apply. Players may hold more than one non-FIFA nationality.

No.	Pos.	Nation	Player
1	GK	GER	Christian Sekanina
2	DF	ESP	Cristobal Molina
3	DF	USA	Matthew Skinner
4	MF	SWE	Kasper Davidsson
5	DF	USA	Owen Guske
6	DF	GER	Paul Danner
7	FW	NED	Ken Raghoebar
8	MF	USA	Evan Schweickert
9	FW	MEX	Oscar Resano
10	FW	CAN	Olivier Correa
11	MF	CAN	Carson Wood
12	MF	USA	Trey Demps
13	DF	NOR	Daniel Wilkins
15	FW	USA	David Robinson

No.	Pos.	Nation	Player
16	DF	PUR	Orion McHugh
17	DF	MEX	Julian Fernandez
18	DF	USA	Shane Clancy
19	DF	USA	Joshua Izu
20	MF	NOR	Tobias Holtan
21	MF	NOR	Iver Skorve
22	MF	CAN	Michael Mancuso
23	MF	USA	Pierce Amalberti
24	DF	USA	Noah Dinnal
25	MF	MEX	Juan Pablo Gonzalez
27	FW	NOR	Aanensen Karlsen
28	GK	NOR	Simen Havig
29	GK	USA	Elijah Buford

=== Coaching staff ===
- (England) Ali Simmons– Head Coach
- (England) Thomas Buckner – Associate Head Coach
- (Denmark) Nick Rulle – Assistant Coach

== Individual achievements ==
=== All-Americans ===
Jacksonville has produced four All-Americans. The most recent All-American came in 2000.

Player	Position	Year
Aleks Mihailovic	MF	1978
Jason Phitides	FW	1984
Peter Popovic	GK	2000
Mladen Dikic	FW	2000

== Honors ==
- ASUN Conference
  - Winners (Tournament) (2): 2008, 2021 Spring
- Sun Belt Conference
  - Winners (Tournament) (3): 1987, 1995, 1996
