= Florida Gulf Coast Eagles men's soccer =

American college soccer team

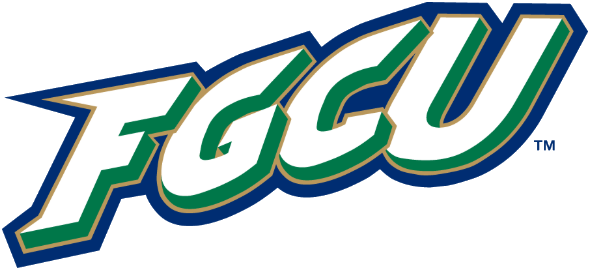
- Founded: 2007; 19 years ago
- University: Florida Gulf Coast University
- Head coach: Jesse Cormier (7th season)
- Conference: Atlantic Sun
- Location: Fort Myers, Florida, US
- Stadium: FGCU Soccer Complex (capacity: 1,500)
- Nickname: Eagles
- Colors: Cobalt blue and emerald green
Home	Away

NCAA tournament Round of 32
- 2016

NCAA tournament appearances
- 2011, 2012, 2014, 2016

Conference tournament championships
- 2011, 2012, 2014, 2016

Conference Regular Season championships
- 2010, 2011, 2012, 2013, 2014, 2015

The Florida Gulf Coast Eagles men's soccer team represents Florida Gulf Coast University in Fort Myers, Florida in all NCAA Division I men's soccer competitions. The Eagles compete in the Atlantic Sun Conference. The soccer team is one of several varsity sports teams that represent the Florida Gulf Coast Eagles.

The team made the NCAA tournament in the first year of eligibility in 2011, and returned in 2012, 2014, and 2016.

== Players ==
=== Current roster ===
As of 23 April 2025

Note: Flags indicate national team as defined under FIFA eligibility rules; some limited exceptions apply. Players may hold more than one non-FIFA nationality.

No.	Pos.	Nation	Player
4	M	ARG	Beltran Alvarez
6	M	GER	Linus Dahl
8	F	BRA	Cao Chaves
9	F	FRA	Pablo Brimeux
10	F	USA	Edson Murguia
11	D	BRA	Victor Lopes
12	D	USA	Samuel Maraver
13	M	BRA	Leo Schorr
14	M	ISR	Alon Drey
15	M	ISR	Shachar Nissim
16	M	CAN	Caylan Lawrence
17	M	GER	Lucas Sperner

No.	Pos.	Nation	Player
18	M	USA	Charlie Retzer
19	D	USA	Dylan Dana
21	D	USA	Jose Escobar
23	D	USA	Ryan Heron
24	D	USA	Arber Shala
25	D	USA	Barrett Saunders
26	F	USA	Job Choute
27	M	CAN	Addrian Knights-Browne
28	M	USA	Brooks Beeman
29	GK	ESP	Eduard Garcia
31	GK	USA	Oliver Weng
33	M	USA	Stanley Bazelais

=== Notable players ===
- Rodrigo Saravia — 2015 Atlantic Sun Conference Player of the Year; first FGCU soccer player invited to the Major League Soccer Player Combine; plays for Comunicaciones and the Guatemala national football team.

== Coaching staff ==
Position	Staff
Head Coach	Oliver Twelvetrees
Associate Head Coach	Owen McCorkle
Assistant Coach	Guillermo Laguna
Assistant Coach	Gustavo Vasconcelos

Last updated: April 23, 2025

Bob Butehorn served as head coach for Florida Gulf Coast Eagles men's soccer from the program's inception in 2007 until 2016. Butehorn was successful at FGCU, posting a perfect 9–0–0 conference record in 2010, and qualifying for four NCAA Division I tournaments (2011, 2012, 2014, and 2016).

== Seasons ==
Statistics overview
Season	Coach	Overall	Conference	Standing	Postseason
Florida Gulf Coast (Atlantic Sun Conference) (2007–present)
2007	Bob Butehorn	6–11–2	3–5–1	7th	Ineligible
2008	Bob Butehorn	6–10–2	3–5–1	7th	Ineligible
2009	Bob Butehorn	8–7–1	6–3–0	3rd	Ineligible
2010	Bob Butehorn	13–3–2	9–0–0	1st	Ineligible
2011	Bob Butehorn	12–6–2	7–1–0	1st	A-Sun Champions; NCAA First Round
2012	Bob Butehorn	11–5–3	6–1–1	1st	A-Sun Champions; NCAA First Round
2013	Bob Butehorn	8–7–2	6–1–1	1st	A-Sun Semifinal
2014	Bob Butehorn	8–7–5	4–1–1	T-1st	A-Sun Champions; NCAA First Round
2015	Bob Butehorn	7–4–3	4–0–1	T-1st	A-Sun Semifinal
2016	Bob Butehorn	14–3–2	4–1–1	2nd	A-Sun Champions; NCAA Second Round
2017	Jesse Cormier	8–6–3	4–1–1	2nd	A-Sun Semifinal
2018	Jesse Cormier	9-5-2	5-1	2nd	A-Sun Semifinal
2019	Jesse Cormier	9–8–2	4–1–1	2nd	A-Sun Final
2021 Spring	Jesse Cormier	3–4–4	2–2–2	4th	A-Sun Final
2021	Jesse Cormier	4–8–1	4–3	4th	A-Sun Quarterfinal
2022	Jesse Cormier	8–5–4	3–2–3	4th	A-Sun Semifinal
2023	Jesse Cormier	3–7–5	2–3–3	5th	
2024	Jesse Cormier	4–10–3	3–3–1	3rd	A-Sun Semifinal
Atlantic Sun Total:			75–30–21		
Total:		134–112–45			
National champion Postseason invitational champion Conference regular season champion Conference regular season and conference tournament champion Division regular season champion Division regular season and conference tournament champion Conference tournament champion

== NCAA tournament results ==
November 17, 2011
NCAA Round 1

FGCU	0–1	Central Florida

UCF Soccer and Track Stadium, Orlando, Florida
Attendance: 535
November 15, 2012
NCAA Round 1

FGCU	0–0 (3–5p)	South Florida

Corbett Soccer Stadium, Tampa, Florida
Attendance: 1,379
November 20, 2014
NCAA Round 1

FGCU	0–1	Coastal Carolina

CCU Soccer Field, Conway, South Carolina
Attendance: 238

== Honors ==
- Atlantic Sun Conference
  - Winners (Tournament) (4): 2011, 2012, 2014, 2016
  - Winners (Regular Season) (6): 2010, 2011, 2012, 2013, 2014, 2015
