= Southern Oak Stadium =

Stadium in Jacksonville, Florida

- Interactive map of Southern Oak Stadium
- Address: 2800 University Blvd. N Jacksonville, FL; United States
- Coordinates: 30.3572185°N 81.6082855°W
- Owner: Jacksonville University
- Operator: Jacksonville Univ. Athletics
- Type: Stadium
- Current use: Soccer

Tenants
- Jacksonville Dolphins (NCAA) teams: men's and women's soccer

Website
- judolphins.com/southern-oak-stadium

Southern Oak Stadium is a soccer-specific stadium located on the campus of Jacksonville University in Jacksonville, Florida. The stadium is home to the Jacksonville Dolphins men's and women's soccer teams.

The venue was, also, home to the 2015 Atlantic Sun Conference women's lacrosse championship. Jacksonville Armada FC have also played some home games at Southern Oak Stadium.
