= Bellarmine Knights men's soccer =

American college soccer team

- 2025 Bellarmine Knights men's soccer team
- Founded: 1974; 52 years ago
- University: Bellarmine University
- Head coach: Tim Chastonay (28th season)
- Conference: Atlantic Sun
- Location: Louisville, Kentucky, US
- Stadium: Frazier Stadium (capacity: 2,000)
- Colors: Scarlet and silver
Home	Away

NCAA tournament Round of 32
- DII: 2019

NCAA tournament appearances
- DII: 2019

Conference tournament championships
- 2019

Conference regular season championships
- 1989

The Bellarmine Knights men's soccer program represents the Bellarmine University in all NCAA Division I men's college soccer competitions. Founded in 1974, the Knights compete in the Atlantic Sun Conference. The Knights are coached by Tim Chastonay, who has coached the program since 1998. The Knights plays their home matches at Owsley B. Frazier Stadium, on the Bellarmine campus.

The Knights began play in NCAA Division I in the 2020 season.

== Roster ==
As of 30 Sep 2024

Note: Flags indicate national team as defined under FIFA eligibility rules; some limited exceptions apply. Players may hold more than one non-FIFA nationality.

No.	Pos.	Nation	Player
1	GK	CAN	Tudor Iordan
2	MF	USA	Cade Morgan
3	DF	USA	Jeremy Mason
4	DF	USA	Karl Lundstrom
5	DF	USA	Austin Yowell
6	DF	USA	Michael Voulgaris
7	FW	USA	Alex Halevy
8	MF	USA	Brendan Schoemehl
9	FW	USA	Chris Shust
10	MF	USA	Ben Griffis
11	FW	NOR	Johan Nissen-Lie
12	MF	USA	Tate McCrery
13	DF	USA	Sawyer Gribble

No.	Pos.	Nation	Player
14	DF	USA	Ty Been
15	DF	USA	Bennett Kirn
16	MF	USA	Luke Gonda
17	DF	SWE	Nore Sumner
18	MF	USA	Jack Fischer
19	MF	SWE	Calle Sjoberg
20	DF	USA	Jeffrey Cox
21	DF	NZL	Rhys Davies
22	MF	USA	Jackson Marks
23	FW	USA	Colin Elder
24	MF	USA	Sawyer Trowel
36	GK	SWE	Hannes Nilsson

== Seasons ==
Season	Coach	Overall	Conference	Standing	Postseason
Independent (1974–1985)
1974	Doug Foland	11–7–0			
1975	Doug Foland	9–6–2			
1976	Bill Beattie	11–4–2			
1977	Bill Beattie	7–9–1			
1978	Bill Beattie	10–7–2			
1979	Bill Beattie	6–7–2			
1980	Bill Beattie	8–9–0			
1981	George Taurman	7–10–1			
1982	George Taurman	6–10–0			
1983	George Taurman	7–7–2			
1984	George Taurman	4–12–1			
1985	George Taurman	12–4–2			
Independent Total:		98–92–15			
Great Lakes Valley Conference (Division II) (1986–2019)
1986	George Taurman	8–8–1	4–3–0	4th	
1987	George Taurman	9–11–0	4–3–0	5th	
1988	George Taurman	8–10–1	3–3–1	T–3rd	
1989	George Taurman	11–9–0	6–1–0	1st	
1990	George Taurman	8–10–2	4–2–1	T–3rd	
1991	Dan Gleason	9–7–0	3–3–1	5th	
1992	Dave Fernandez	9–10–0	3–3–0	T–4th	
1993	Dave Fernandez	4–11–2	1–4–1	7th	
1994	Dave Fernandez	7–10–2	2–3–1	4th	
1995	Dave Fernandez	8–12–0	3–5–0	T–6th	
1996	Doug Robb	7–12–0	4–7–0	T–7th	
1997	Doug Robb	9–10–0	4–7–0	8th	
1998	Tim Chastonay	6–12–1	1–9–1	11th	
1999	Tim Chastonay	8–12–0	2–9–0	10th	
2000	Tim Chastonay	6–12–1	0–10–1	12th	
2001	Tim Chastonay	11–9–0	4–7–0	7th	
2002	Tim Chastonay	11–8–0	5–6–0	6th	
2003	Tim Chastonay	8–8–3	2–5–3	7th	
2004	Tim Chastonay	7–9–2	3–6–1	7th	
2005	Tim Chastonay	9–8–3	5–6–2	8th	
2006	Tim Chastonay	9–8–0	6–7–0	10th	
2007	Tim Chastonay	12–9–0	8–5–0	5th	
2008	Tim Chastonay	9–7–4	5–5–2	6th	
2009	Tim Chastonay	11–6–1	8–5–0	5th	
2010	Tim Chastonay	10–5–2	8–4–2	6th	
2011	Tim Chastonay	10–7–2	9–5–1	6th	
2012	Tim Chastonay	10–5–3	9–3–3	4th	
2013	Tim Chastonay	8–6–4	6–5–4	8th	
2014	Tim Chastonay	8–8–3	6–6–3	8th	
2015	Tim Chastonay	10–9–0	8–7–0	6th	
2016	Tim Chastonay	6–8–4	5–7–3	10th	
2017	Tim Chastonay	11–5–1	9–4–1	T–4th	
2018	Tim Chastonay	12–5–2	9–3–1	2nd	
2019	Tim Chastonay	16–1–5	10–0–4	2nd	NCAA Division II Third round
GLVC Total:		305–284–49	169–169–37		
Atlantic Sun Conference (Division I) (2020–present)
2020	Tim Chastonay	4–4–0	3–1–0	1st (North)	
2021	Tim Chastonay	7–8–2	2–4–1	T–6th	
2022	Tim Chastonay	6–4–8	2–3–3	6th	
2023	Tim Chastonay	6–5–6	3–2–2	T–2nd	
2024	Tim Chastonay	5–6–5	2–3–2	T–6th	
ASUN Total:		28–27–21	12–12–8		
Total:		485–403–85			
National champion Postseason invitational champion Conference regular season champion Conference regular season and conference tournament champion Division regular season champion Division regular season and conference tournament champion Conference tournament champion

== Championships ==
=== Conference Regular Season Championships ===
Year	Coach	Overall Record	Conference Record
1989	George Taurman	11–9–0	6–1–0
Conference Regular Season Championships			1

== Coaching records ==
Years	Coach	Overall Record
1974–1975	Doug Foland	20–13–2 (.600)
1976–1980	Bill Beattie	42–36–7 (.535)
1981–1990	George Taurman	80–91–9 (.469)
1991	Dan Gleason	9–7–0 (.563)
1992–1995	Dave Fernandez	28–43–4 (.400)
1996–1997	Doug Robb	16–22–0 (.421)
1998–	Tim Chastonay	236–191–62 (.546)

== Postseason ==
=== NCAA Division II Tournament results ===
Bellarmine made one appearance in the NCAA Division II Men's Soccer Tournament. Their record is 0–1–1.

Year	Round	Opponent	Result
2019	Second round Third round	Cedarville; Maryville (MO)	T 0–0; L 1–2
