= North Florida Ospreys men's soccer =

American college soccer team

North Florida Ospreys
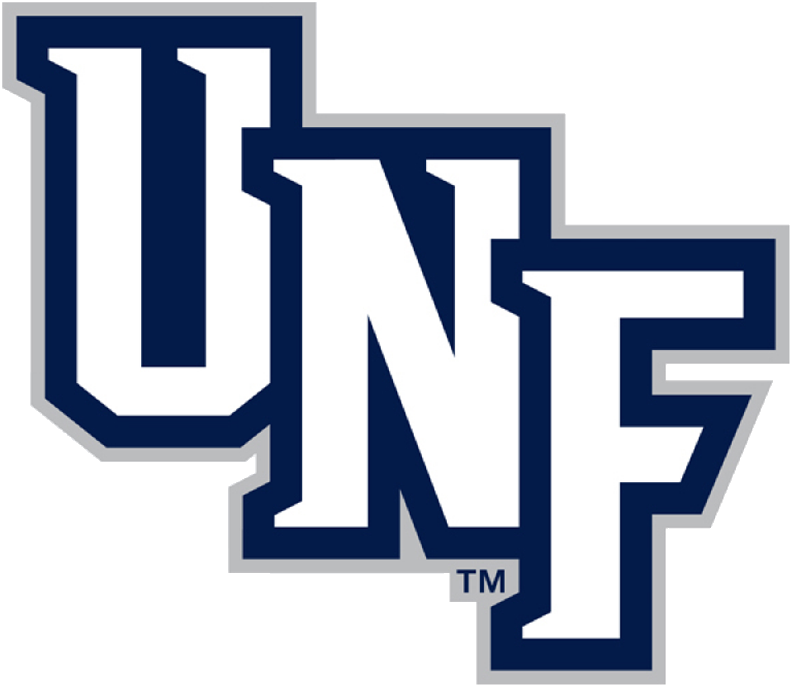
- Founded: 1991; 35 years ago
- University: University of North Florida
- Head coach: Jamie Davies (2nd season)
- Conference: Atlantic Sun
- Location: Jacksonville, Florida, US
- Stadium: Hodges Stadium (capacity: 12,000)
- Nickname: UNF, Ospreys
- Colors: Navy blue and gray
Home	Away

NCAA tournament appearances
- 2015, 2024, 2025

Conference tournament championships
- 2015, 2024, 2025

Conference regular season championships
- 2015, 2025

The North Florida Ospreys men's soccer program represents the University of North Florida in all NCAA Division I men's college soccer competitions. Founded in 1991, the Ospreys compete in the ASUN Conference. The Ospreys are coached by Jamie Davies, who has coached the program since 2024. The Ospreys plays their home matches at Hodges Stadium, on the UNF campus.

== Roster ==
As of November 2026

Note: Flags indicate national team as defined under FIFA eligibility rules; some limited exceptions apply. Players may hold more than one non-FIFA nationality.

No.	Pos.	Nation	Player
0	GK	ESP	Iu Pentinat
00	GK	USA	Akash Poola
1	GK	USA	Luciano Natoli
2	MF	USA	Tyler Prebenda
3	DF	ENG	Alfie Mattocks
4	DF	ESP	Rafa Rios
5	DF	FRA	Paul Schacherer
6	MF	ENG	Cameron Gray
7	FW	FRA	Kaiss Mansouri
8	FW	USA	Mark Romano
9	FW	BRA	Geraldo Neto
10	MF	FRA	Anton Khelil
11	FW	FRA	Alex Monde
12	FW	USA	Owen Lewis
13	FW	USA	Robert Calazans
15	DF	USA	Brian McManus Jr.

No.	Pos.	Nation	Player
16	DF	JPN	Ryuta Morioka
18	MF	USA	Omar Trto
19	FW	USA	Emir Trto
20	FW	USA	Tyler Tilden
21	DF	USA	Mikhail Keise
22	MF	USA	Kadin Sadiq
24	DF	FRA	Milan Ales
25	DF	USA	Sasha Maric
26	MF	USA	Nicolas Tafurt
27	DF	FRA	Germain Kapela
28	MF	KOR	Yurok Cho
30	GK	USA	Austin Gains
33	DF	BRA	Tarik Freire
77	DF	FRA	Max Maneke
99	MF	FRA	Ugo Bertelli

== Coaching history ==
Years	Coach	Games	W	L	T	Pct.
1991–2010	Ray Bunch	342	156	164	22	.488
2011–2023	Derek Marinatos	200	68	109	23	.398
2024–	Jamie Davies	19	7	8	4	.474

== Seasons ==
Record table
Season	Coach	Overall	Conference	Standing	Postseason
Independent (NAIA) (1991–1991)
1991	Ray Bunch	7–8–0			
NAIA Total:		7–8–0			
Sunshine State (NCAA DII) (1992–1996)
1992	Ray Bunch	12–8–0	2–4–0	N/A	
1993	Ray Bunch	10–6–2	2–3–2		
1994	Ray Bunch	12–6–0	2–5–0	6th	
1995	Ray Bunch	6–8–3	1–4–2	7th	
1996	Ray Bunch	12–6–1	5–2–0	3rd	
Sunshine State Total:		52–34–6	12–18–4		
Peach Belt (NCAA DII) (1997–2004)
1997	Ray Bunch	7–9–1	3–4–0	5th	Peach Belt First Round
1998	Ray Bunch	7–11–1	3–4–0	5th	Peach Belt Semifinals
1999	Ray Bunch	11–3–3	5–1–1	2nd	Peach Belt Semifinals
2000	Ray Bunch	11–7–0	4–3–0	3rd	Peach Belt First Round
2001	Ray Bunch	7–5–3	3–3–0	3rd	Peach Belt First Round
2002	Ray Bunch	8–5–2	4–1–1	2nd	Peach Belt First Round
2003	Ray Bunch	8–8–1	3–3–0	5th	Peach Belt First Round
2004	Ray Bunch	5–9–1	2–3–1	5th	Peach Belt First Round
Peach Belt Total:		64–57–12	27–22–3		
Atlantic Sun (NCAA DI) (2005–present)
2005	Ray Bunch	3–10–1	3–5–0	7th	
2006	Ray Bunch	6–11–2	1–5–1	T–7th	
2007	Ray Bunch	8–9–0	5–4–0	4th	
2008	Ray Bunch	9–10–0	4–5–0	6th	
2009	Ray Bunch	4–13–1	4–4–1	4th	ASUN First Round
2010	Ray Bunch	3–12–0	2–7–0	8th	
2011	Derek Marinatos	1–15–0	0–8–0	9th	
2012	Derek Marinatos	4–13–0	3–6–0	9th	
2013	Derek Marinatos	8–7–3	2–4–2	6th	ASUN Championship Game
2014	Derek Marinatos	8–7–1	3–2–1	4th	ASUN Championship Game
2015	Derek Marinatos	10–7–1	4–0–1	T–1st	NCAA First round
2016	Derek Marinatos	9–4–2	5–0–1	1st	ASUN Semifinals
2017	Derek Marinatos	3–10–2	2–3–1	4th	ASUN First Round
2018	Derek Marinatos	4–11–0	3–3–0	3rd	ASUN First Round
2019	Derek Marinatos	6–8–2	3–2–1	3rd	ASUN Semifinals
2020	Derek Marinatos	4–3–3	2–2–2	3rd	ASUN Quarterfinals
2021	Derek Marinatos	4–8–1	2–5–0	8th	
2022	Derek Marinatos	4–8–4	3–3–2	5th	ASUN First Round
2023	Derek Marinatos	3–8–4	0–6–1	8th	
2024	Jamie Davies	7–8–4	4–2–1	T–1st	NCAA First round
ASUN Total:		108–195–31	56–76–15		
Total:		231–281–49			
National champion Postseason invitational champion Conference regular season champion Conference regular season and conference tournament champion Division regular season champion Division regular season and conference tournament champion Conference tournament champion

== Individual honors ==
The following players have earned a postseason award.

=== National awards ===
No players have won a national award.

=== Regional awards ===
- NAIA All District
  - 1991: Gary McCall (2nd team)
  - 1992: Gary McCall (1st team)
  - 1992: Matt Sessions (2nd team)
- NSCAA All-South Region
  - 1993: Gary McCall (3rd team)
  - 1994: Nate Silva (2nd team)
  - 1994: Chris Dunn (3rd team)
  - 1996: A. J. Romano (2nd team)
  - 1996: Peter Sesay (2nd team)
  - 2009: Matthew Hollyoak (2nd team)

=== Conference awards ===
- Atlantic Sun Men's Soccer Tournament MVP
  - 2015: Helge Pietschmann
- Peach Belt Conference Player of the Year
  - 2000: Danny Spake
- Peach Belt Conference Freshman of the Year
  - 1998: Robert West
  - 2004: Martin Pettersson

== Titles ==
=== Conference ===
- ASUN tournament (3): 2015, 2024, 2025
