= Stetson Hatters =

Sports teams of Stetson University

- University: Stetson University
- NCAA: Division I (FCS)
- Conference: ASUN (primary); PFL (football); FIRA (men's rowing); MAAC (women's rowing)
- Athletic director: Dr. Ricky Ray
- Location: DeLand, Florida
- Varsity teams: 19 (8 men's, 10 women's)
- Football stadium: Spec Martin Memorial Stadium
- Basketball arena: J. Ollie Edmunds Center
- Baseball stadium: Melching Field at Conrad Park
- Softball stadium: Patricia Wilson Field
- Soccer stadium: Athletic Training Center
- Aquatics center: Sandra Stetson Aquatic Center
- Tennis venue: Mandy Stoll Tennis Center
- Nickname: Hatters
- Colors: Hunter green and white
- Mascot: John B.
- Website: gohatters.com
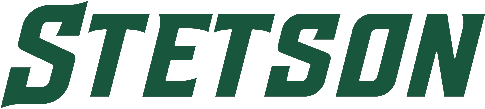

The Stetson Hatters are composed of 18 teams representing Stetson University in intercollegiate athletics. The Hatters compete in the NCAA Division I Football Championship Subdivision (FCS) and are primary members of the Atlantic Sun Conference for most sports, excluding the university's football program, which competes in the Pioneer Football League. Their mascot is John B.

== Varsity teams ==
| Men's sports | Women's sports |
|---|---|
| Basketball | Basketball |
| Baseball | Softball |
| Football | Volleyball |
| Cross country | Cross country |
| Golf | Golf |
| Rowing | Rowing |
| Soccer | Soccer |
| Tennis | Tennis |
| | Beach Volleyball |
| | Lacrosse |

A member of the ASUN Conference (ASUN) since 1985, Stetson University sponsors teams in eight men's and ten women's NCAA sanctioned sports.

=== Golf ===
In 1948, Grace Lenczyk won the women's individual intercollegiate golf championship (an event conducted by the Division of Girls' and Women's Sports (DGWS) — which later evolved into the current NCAA women's golf championship).

=== Wrestling ===
Stetson had Varsity wrestling for 3 years (1983-1986).

== Notable alumni ==
- Fredrik Brustad, forward for Stabæk Fotball, Molde FK, and Norway
- Jacob deGrom, pitcher for the Texas Rangers
- Logan Gilbert, pitcher for the Seattle Mariners
- Earnie Killum, guard for the Los Angeles Lakers
- Corey Kluber, retired MLB Pitcher
- Donald Parham, tight end for the Los Angeles Chargers
- Donald Payne, linebacker for the Jacksonville Jaguars
- Nick Rickles, catcher, Washington Nationals and Philadelphia Phillies organizations; Team Israel
- George Tsamis, pitcher, formerly of the Minnesota Twins
