= Lipscomb Bisons men's soccer =

American college soccer team

Lipscomb Bisons
- Founded: 1979; 47 years ago
- University: Lipscomb University
- Head coach: Charles Morrow (14th season)
- Conference: Atlantic Sun
- Location: Nashville, Tennessee, US
- Stadium: Lipscomb Soccer Complex (capacity: 1,500)
- Nickname: Bisons
- Colors: Purple and gold
Home	Away

NCAA tournament Round of 16
- 2018

NCAA tournament Round of 32
- 2018, 2022

NCAA tournament appearances
- 2017, 2018, 2021, 2022, 2023

Conference tournament championships
- 2017, 2018, 2021, 2022, 2023

Conference Regular Season championships
- 2018, 2023

The Lipscomb Bisons men's soccer team represents Lipscomb University in all NCAA Division I men's college soccer competitions. The Bisons play in the ASUN Conference, where they are the two-time defending A-Sun champions.

== Roster ==
As of 1 Oct 2024

Note: Flags indicate national team as defined under FIFA eligibility rules; some limited exceptions apply. Players may hold more than one non-FIFA nationality.

No.	Pos.	Nation	Player
1	GK	ESP	Juan Carlos Rodriguez
2	MF	USA	Zach Kennedy
3	DF	CAN	Daniel Stampatori
4	DF	ENG	George Macready
5	MF	USA	Cooper Kieran
6	MF	USA	Bubu Medina
7	DF	USA	Yuushin Nakagawa
8	MF	GER	Luca Naumann
10	FW	GER	Dan Karsten
11	FW	CAN	Josiah Green
12	FW	ENG	Javanne Smith
13	DF	USA	Keegan Yorke

No.	Pos.	Nation	Player
14	MF	SLE	Levi Jones
15	FW	USA	Carson Cooke
16	MF	USA	Camilo Estrada
17	MF	BAH	Roen Davis
18	DF	ITA	Matteo Colombo
19	MF	USA	Patrick Walz
21	MF	USA	Tyler Stinnett
22	GK	USA	Noah Kump
23	DF	USA	Baxter Hurt
24	FW	USA	Aidan Boehmer
34	GK	USA	Aidan Strickler

== Postseason ==
=== NCAA tournament results ===
Year	Round	Opponent	Venue	City	Result	Record
2017	First round	at Butler	Butler Bowl	Indianapolis, Indiana	L 0–2	0–1–0
2018	First round	at Washington	Husky Soccer Stadium	Seattle, Washington	T 0–0; W 5–4 (p)	0–1–1
2018	Second round	at UCF	UCF Soccer Stadium	Orlando, Florida	W 1–0 ^{OT}	1–1–1
2018	Third round	at Kentucky	Bell Soccer Complex	Lexington, Kentucky	L 1–2	1–2–1
2021	First round	at Hofstra	Shuart Stadium	Hempstead, New York	L 2–4	0–1–0
2022	Second round	vs Western Michigan	Lipscomb Soccer Complex	Nashville, TN	L 0–1	0–1–0
