= 2021 Big Ten Conference men's soccer season =

- League: NCAA Division I
- Sport: Soccer
- Duration: August 26, 2021 – October 31, 2021
- Teams: 9

2022 MLS SuperDraft
- Top draft pick: Ben Bender, 1st overall
- Picked by: Charlotte FC

Regular Season
- Season champions: Penn State
- Season MVP: OPOY: Peter Mangione; MFOY: Ben Bender; DPOY: Daniel Munie; GKOY: Roman Celentano
- Top scorer: Andrew Privett (9)

Tournament
- Champions: Penn State
- Runners-up: Indiana
- Finals MVP: Offense: Seth Kuhn; Defense: Kris Shakes

Big Ten Conference men's soccer seasons
- ← 2020 2022 →

2021 Big Ten Conference men's soccer standings
	Conf.					Overall
Team	W		L		T	W		L		T
No. 24 Penn State ‡	6	–	2	–	0	13	–	7	–	1
No. 23 Maryland +	5	–	2	–	1	12	–	4	–	2
No. 14 Indiana +	5	–	3	–	0	15	–	6	–	1
Michigan	4	–	3	–	1	8	–	7	–	3
Rutgers	3	–	4	–	1	9	–	6	–	2
Wisconsin	3	–	4	–	1	7	–	7	–	3
Northwestern	3	–	5	–	0	6	–	8	–	2
Michigan State	2	–	4	–	2	6	–	8	–	2
Ohio State	2	–	6	–	0	6	–	9	–	1
‡ – 2021 B1G Tournament champion + – At-large invitation to the 2021 NCAA Tournament; As of December 14, 2021; Rankings from United Soccer Coaches; Source: Big Ten

The 2021 Big Ten Conference men's soccer season is the 31st season of men's varsity soccer in the conference. The season began in August 2021 and concluded in November 2021.

The season will culminate with the 2021 Big Ten Men's Soccer Tournament to determine the conference's automatic berth into the 2021 NCAA Division I Men's Soccer Tournament.

== Background ==
=== Previous season ===
The previous season was the 30th season of men's varsity soccer in the conference. Due to the COVID-19 pandemic, the 2020 Big Ten regular season was postponed and began on February 3, 2021 and concluded on April 17, 2021. The season culminated with the 2020 Big Ten Men's Soccer Tournament to determine the conference's automatic berth into the 2020 NCAA Division I Men's Soccer Tournament. Indiana defeated Penn State in the Big Ten Men's Soccer Championship Game.

With the Big Ten title, Indiana earned the conference's automatic berth into the 2020 NCAA Tournament, where Maryland, and Penn State joined as at-large berths. Maryland was eliminated in the Second Round, while Penn State were eliminated in the Third Round, and Indiana lost in the 2020 NCAA Division I Men's Soccer Championship Game.

== Head coaches ==
As of the 2021 season

Team	Head coach	Previous job	Years at school	Overall record	Record at school	Big Ten record	NCAA Tournaments	NCAA College Cups	NCAA Titles
Indiana	Todd Yeagley	Wisconsin	10	129–54–36 (.671)	122–45–34 (.692)	35–15–18 (.647)	10	3	1
Maryland	Sasho Cirovski	Hartford	27	412–156–60 (.704)	386–143–53 (.709)	24–9–7 (.688)	25	9	3
Michigan	Chaka Daley	Providence	8	151–165–48 (.481)	61–54–21 (.526)	23–20–9 (.529)	3	0	0
Michigan State	Damon Rensing	Michigan State (asst.)	11	117–66–30 (.620)	117–66–30 (.620)	31–26–13 (.536)	8	1	0
Northwestern	Tim Lenahan	Lafayette	19	305–209–72 (.582)	169–140–51 (.540)	36–60–20 (.397)	9	0	0
Ohio State	Brian Maisonneuve	Indiana (asst.)	3	1–15–2 (.111)	1–15–2 (.111)	0–7–1 (.063)	0	0	0
Penn State	Jeff Cook	Bethlehem Steel (asst.)	3	127–104–36 (.543)	6–9–2 (.412)	3–3–2 (.500)	9	0	0
Rutgers	Jim McElderry	Fordham	2	127–125–37 (.503)	0–0–0 (–)	0–0–0 (–)	3	0	0
Wisconsin	John Trask	UIC	11	129–96–55 (.559)	75–72–29 (.509)	26–28–10 (.484)	2	0	0

== Preseason ==
=== Preseason poll ===
The preseason poll was released on August 23, 2021. Indiana was selected unanimously as the favorite to win the Big Ten.

	Team ranking
1.	Indiana
2.	Penn State
3.	Michigan
4.	Maryland
5.	Michigan State
6.	Rutgers
7.	Ohio State
8.	Northwestern
9.	Wisconsin

=== Preseason national polls ===
The preseason national polls were released in August 2021.

	United; Soccer	CSN	Top Drawer; Soccer
Indiana	2	2	2
Maryland	—	28	—
Michigan	—	—	—
Michigan State	—	—	—
Northwestern	—	—	—
Ohio State	—	—	—
Penn State	11	12	10
Rutgers	—	—	—
Wisconsin	—	—	—

== Postseason ==
=== Big Ten Tournament ===
The Big Ten Tournament was held from November 7–14, 2021.

Quarterfinals; November 7
1	Penn State	2
8	Michigan State	0
4	Michigan	2
5	Wisconsin	1
3	Indiana	1
6	Rutgers	0
2	Maryland	0 (2)
7	Northwestern (pen.)	0 (3)

Semifinals; November 10
1	Penn State	2
4	Michigan	0
3	Indiana (a.e.t.)	1
7	Northwestern	0

Championship; November 14
1	Penn State	3
3	Indiana	0

=== NCAA Tournament ===
Seed	Region	School	1st round	2nd round	3rd round	Quarterfinals	Semifinals	Championship
12	2	Penn State	BYE	L 2–8 vs. Hofstra – (State College)	—	—	—	—
15	4	Indiana	BYE	W 2–0 vs. Bowling Green – (Bloomington)	L 2–3 at (2) Washington – (Seattle)	—	—	—
—N/a	4	Maryland	L 0–1 vs. Penn – (College Park)	—	—	—	—	—
W–L–D (%):			0–1–0 (.000)	1–1–0 (.500)	0–1–0 (.000)	0–0–0 (–)	0–0–0 (–)	0–0–0 (–) Total: 1–3–0 (.250)

== MLS SuperDraft ==
=== Total picks by school ===
Team	Round 1	Round 2	Round 3	Total
Indiana	1	–	–	1
Maryland	1	1	–	2
Michigan	–	–	–	0
Michigan State	1	–	–	1
Northwestern	–	–	–	0
Ohio State	–	–	–	0
Penn State	–	–	2	2
Rutgers	–	–	–	0
Wisconsin	–	–	–	0
Total	3	1	2	6

=== List of selections ===
Round	Pick #	MLS team	Player	Position	College
1	1	Charlotte FC	(United States) Ben Bender	MF	Maryland
1	2	FC Cincinnati	(United States) Roman Celentano	GK	Indiana
1	21	LA Galaxy	(Zimbabwe) Farai Mutatu	FW	Michigan State
2	50	Sporting Kansas City	(United States) Brett St. Martin	DF	Maryland
3	73	New York Red Bulls	(United States) Seth Kuhn	MF	Penn State
3	75	Atlanta United FC	(Ghana) Daniel Bloyou	FW	Penn State
