= 2020 NCAA Division I men's soccer championship game =

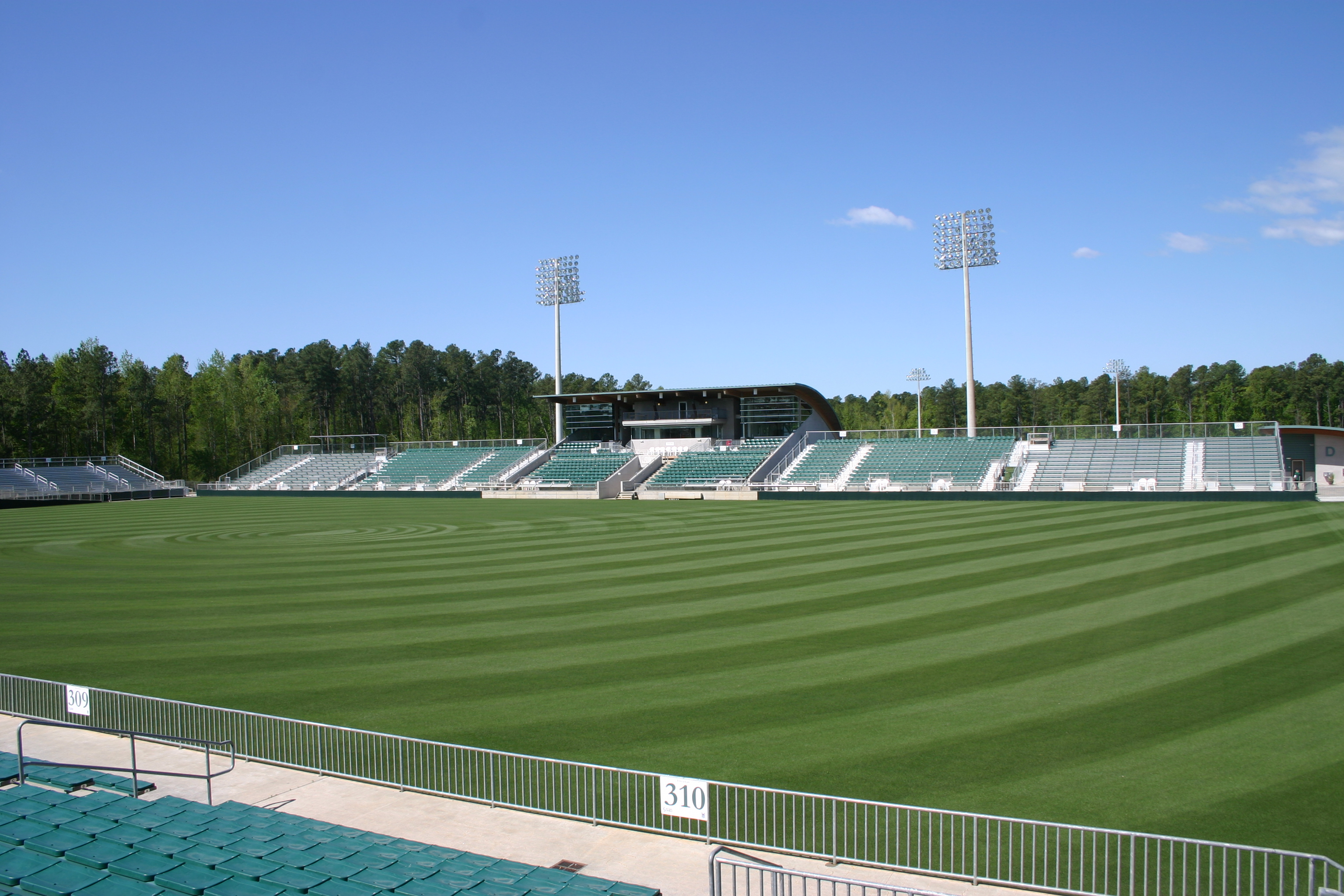
- WakeMed Soccer Park, venue
- Event: 2020 NCAA Division I men's soccer tournament
Marshall	Indiana
C-USA	Big Ten
1	0
- After extra time
- Date: May 17, 2021
- Venue: WakeMed Soccer Park, Cary, North Carolina, U.S.
- College Cup MOP: Jamil Roberts (offensive); Roman Celentano (defensive)
- Referee: Sorin Stoica
- Attendance: 5,000

The 2020 NCAA Division I men's soccer championship game (also known as the 2020 NCAA Division I Men's College Cup) was played on May 17, 2021, at WakeMed Soccer Park in Cary, North Carolina and determined the winner of the 2020 NCAA Division I men's soccer tournament, the national collegiate soccer championship in the United States. This was the 62nd edition of the oldest active competition in United States college soccer.

The tournament final was original slated to be held on December 13, 2020, but due to the COVID-19 pandemic in the United States, the tournament was postponed to May 2021 by the NCAA, making it the first NCAA Soccer Championship Game to be played in the Spring time. Despite being played in 2021, the competition retained its 2020 branding.

The match featured Marshall University of Conference USA (C-USA) and Indiana University of the Big Ten Conference.

Marshall won the match on a golden goal in extra time becoming the first unseeded team to win the championship since UC Santa Barbara in 2006. This was Marshall's first men's soccer title and was also the first national title in a team sport won by a C-USA member while affiliated with the league. Marshall was also the first mid-major program to win the national championship since Akron did so in 2010.

== Road to the final ==
The NCAA Division I men's soccer tournament, sometimes known as the College Cup, is an American intercollegiate soccer tournament conducted by the National Collegiate Athletic Association (NCAA), and determines the Division I men's national champion. The tournament has been formally held since 1959, when it was an eight-team tournament. Since then, the tournament has expanded to 48 teams, in which every Division I conference tournament champion is allocated a berth. However, this season's tournament had a reduced tournament field size of 36 teams due to the ongoing COVID-19 pandemic. It was Marshall's first title game appearance in school history, and Indiana's first appearance since 2017, where they lost to Stanford. Indiana has won the NCAA Tournament on eight previous occasions: 1982, 1983, 1988, 1998, 1999, 2003, 2004, and 2012.

Marshall (C-USA)		Round	Indiana (Big Ten)	
Opponent	Result	NCAA Tournament	Opponent	Result
Bye	—N/a	First Round	Bye	—N/a
Fordham (A-10)	2–1 (N)	Second Round	St. Francis (NEC)	1–1 (N)
Clemson (ACC)	1–1 (N)	Third Round (Sweet 16)	Marquette (Big East)	2–1 (N)
Georgetown (Big East)	1–0 (N)	Quarterfinals (Elite 8)	Seton Hall (Big East)	2–0 (N)
North Carolina (ACC)	1–0 (N)	College Cup (Final 4)	Pittsburgh (ACC)	1–0 (N)

=== Marshall ===
Marshall University was making their first appearance in the College Cup final in only their second NCAA Tournament appearance in school history. On April 18, the program qualified for the NCAA Tournament by winning the C-USA regular season championship by defeating Charlotte 2–0 in the season finale, claiming the conference's automatic berth into the NCAA Tournament. It was the Thundering Herd's second consecutive Conference USA title. Entering the national championship game, Marshall accumulated a record of 12–2–3 across all competitions, and a 6–0–1 record in C-USA play.

Entering the NCAA Tournament, Marshall was ranked tenth overall in the United Soccer Coaches poll, but were unseeded. However, they earned a bye into the second round of the tournament. On May 2, in the second round, Marshall played A-10 Tournament champions, Fordham. Marshall needed an overtime goal by Milo Yosef to secure a 2–1 victory over the Rams. The Thundering Herd played number one overall seed and ACC Tournament champions, Clemson, to a 1–1 tie in the a third round (Sweet 16) on May 6. Marshall advanced on penalty kicks, winning 7–6.

On May 10, in the Quarterfinals (Elite 8), Marshall played Big East champions, 8th-seeded, and defending national champions, Georgetown Hoyas. The Herd defeated the Hoyas thanks to a Jamil Roberts goal in the 70th minute to win by a score of 1–0, allowing Marshall to book their trip to the College Cup (Final 4) for the first time in school history.

On May 14, the College Cup semifinal round was held at WakeMed Soccer Park in Cary, North Carolina, where Marshall played against unseeded North Carolina from the ACC. North Carolina was making their ninth College Cup appearance having won the NCAA College Cup twice before in 2001 and 2011. Despite Marshall being outshot 11–1 by UNC during the game, Marshall made its one shot count in the 60th minute as it proved to be the only goal of the match. Marshall's 1–0 victory made them the fourth unseeded team to reach the National Championship game since 2003.

=== Indiana ===
Indiana University was making their record sixteenth appearance in the national championship. Of the previous fifteen finals, Indiana had won eight of the finals, with their last loss in a national championship coming in 2017. Indiana booked their 34th consecutive appearance in the NCAA Division I Men's Soccer Tournament on April 17, with a 3–2 penalty kick win against Penn State in the Big Ten Men's Soccer Championship Game. It was Indiana's third consecutive Big Ten Men's Soccer Tournament title as well as their third consecutive regular season championship. Entering the national championship game, Indiana accumulated a record of 12–1–2 across all competitions, and a 7–1–0 record in Big Ten play.

Entering the NCAA Tournament, Indiana ranked second overall in the United Soccer Coaches poll, and were given the third overall seed, allowing them to earn a bye into the second round of the tournament. The Hoosiers first NCAA Tournament game came on May 2, where they played the Northeast Conference champions, St. Francis Brooklyn. Indiana advanced 3–1 on penalty kicks after the matched ended in a 1–1 tie. The Hoosier played the Big East Midwest Division champions, Marquette in the third round (Sweet Sixteen) on May 6. Two second half goals by the Hoosiers proved to be the difference in the match as Indiana won 2–1.

On May 10, Indiana hosted the Big East Tournament champions, and 6th-seeded, Seton Hall. Indiana won the game 2–0 to advance to the College Cup for the third time in four years and the 21st time in school history.

On May 14, Indiana played second seeded Pittsburgh from the ACC in the College Cup semifinals, which was the second match of a doubleheader at WakeMed Soccer Park. In front of a crowd of 2,667, Indiana's Herbert Endeley scored a goal in the 79th minute to lift the Hoosiers past the Panthers and into the National Championship game by a score of 1–0

== Match ==
=== Details ===
May 17, 2021
9:15 PM EDT

Marshall	1–0 (a.e.t.)	Indiana
Roberts 98'	Report

WakeMed Soccer Park, Cary
Attendance: 5,000
Referee: Sorin Stoica

Marshall	Indiana

GK	1	(Germany) Oliver Semmle
CB	6	(Canada) Nathan Dossantos	(yellow card) 82'
FW	7	(Germany) Milo Yosef
MF	8	(Brazil) Vinicius Fernandes		(substituted off) 66' (substituted in) 79'
MF	10	(Brazil) Pedro Dolabella
FW	11	(England) Jamil Roberts		(substituted off) 86' (substituted in) 90'
LB	16	(Brazil) Gabriel Alves	(yellow card) 19'
RB	20	(United States) Collin Mocyunas	(yellow card) 48'
MF	23	(Germany) Max Schneider
RB	30	(Germany) Jan-Erik Leinhos	(yellow card) 67'
FW	31	(Brazil) Vitor Dias		(substituted off) 79' (substituted in) 86'
Substitutes:
MF	17	(Brazil) Joao Souza		(substituted in) 66' (substituted off) 90'
Manager:
(England) Chris Grassie

GK	1	(United States) Roman Celentano
DF	2	(United States) Joey Maher
DF	4	(United States) A.J. Palazzolo		(substituted off) 57' (substituted in) 66'
DF	5	(United States) Daniel Munie
FW	7	(Argentina) Victor Bezerra		(substituted off) 87' (substituted in) 91'
MF	8	(United States) Joe Schmidt	(yellow card) 50'
FW	9	(United States) Thomas Warr		(substituted off) 26' (substituted in) 55' (substituted off) 66' (substituted in) 87' (substituted off) 91'
DF	11	(United States) Nyk Sessock		(substituted off) 44' (substituted in) 46'
FW	14	(United States) Maouloune Goumballe		(substituted off) 55' (substituted in) 66'
FW	17	(United States) Herbert Endeley
DF	19	(United States) Brett Bebej
Substitutes:
FW	18	(United States) Ryan Wittenbrink		(substituted in) 35' (substituted off) 70' (substituted in) 76'
MF	20	(United States) Ben Yeagley		(substituted in) 44' (substituted off) 46' (substituted in) 57' (substituted off) 66'
FW	26	(United States) Nate Ward		(substituted in) 26' (substituted off) 35' (substituted in) 70' (substituted off) 76'
Manager:
(United States) Todd Yeagley

College Cup MVP
Offensive: Jamil Roberts (Marshall)
Defensive: Roman Celentano (Indiana)

Assistant referees:
Eric Weisbrod (United States)
Ryan Graves (United States)
Fourth official:
Brandon Marion (United States)

Match rules:

- 90 minutes.
- 20 minutes of extra time if necessary.
- Penalty shoot-out if scores still level.
- Unlimited substitutes, may not return if subbed out in the first half; may return unlimited times in the second half.

=== Statistics ===
Overall
	Marshall	Indiana
Goals scored	1	0
Total shots	17	8
Shots on target	8	1
Saves	1	7
Corner kicks	7	2
Offsides	3	2
Yellow cards	4	1
Red cards	0	0
