= 2020 Indiana Hoosiers men's soccer team =

American college soccer season

2020 Indiana Hoosiers men's soccer

Big Ten regular season and tournament champions

NCAA Tournament, Runner-Up
- Conference: Big Ten Conference
- U. Soc. Coaches poll: No. 2
- TopDrawerSoccer.com: No. 2
- Record: 12–2–2 (7–1–0 Big Ten)
- Head coach: Todd Yeagley (11th season)
- Assistant coaches: Kevin Robson (6th season); Danny O'Rourke (3rd season); Christian Lomeli (2nd season)
- Home stadium: Bill Armstrong Stadium

2020 Big Ten Conference men's soccer standings
	Conf.					Overall
Team	W		L		T	W		L		T
No. 2 Indiana ‡	7	–	1	–	0	12	–	2	–	2
No. 11 Penn State +	6	–	1	–	1	10	–	2	–	2
Michigan	5	–	3	–	1	6	–	4	–	1
Maryland +	4	–	3	–	1	4	–	5	–	2
Rutgers	4	–	4	–	0	4	–	4	–	1
Michigan State	4	–	6	–	0	4	–	7	–	0
Ohio State	3	–	5	–	1	3	–	6	–	1
Northwestern	2	–	7	–	1	2	–	8	–	1
Wisconsin	2	–	7	–	1	2	–	7	–	1
‡ – 2020 B1G Tournament champion + – Also invited to the 2020 NCAA Tournament; As of May 28, 2021; Rankings from United Soccer Coaches; Source: Big Ten

The 2020 Indiana Hoosiers men's soccer team represented Indiana University Bloomington in men's college soccer during the 2020 NCAA Division I men's soccer season and 2020 Big Ten Conference men's soccer season. It was the 48th season the university fielded a men's varsity soccer program, and the 30th season the program played in the Big Ten Conference. Indiana played their home games at Bill Armstrong Stadium and were coached by 11th-year head coach, Todd Yeagley.

The season was originally scheduled to begin on August 28, 2020, and conclude on December 15, 2020; but was postponed to a February 19, 2021 start and May 17, 2021, end due to the COVID-19 pandemic.

== Background ==
The 2019 Indiana Hoosiers men's soccer team represented Indiana University Bloomington in men's college soccer during the 2019 NCAA Division I men's soccer season and 2019 Big Ten Conference men's soccer season. It was the 47th season the university fielded a men's varsity soccer program, and the 29th season the program played in the Big Ten Conference.

During the regular season Indiana completed the league double by winning both the Big Ten regular season, and the 2019 Big Ten Conference Men's Soccer Tournament, successfully repeating their 2018 successes. The Hoosiers were seeded fifth overall in the 2019 NCAA Division I Men's Soccer Tournament, where they reached the Third Round before losing to UC Santa Barbara.

Three Indiana players were selected in the 2020 MLS SuperDraft: Jack Maher was selected by expansion club, Nashville SC with the second overall pick. Simon Waever was drafted by Toronto FC late in the second round with the 51st overall pick. Joris Ahlinvi was selected early in the third round by FC Cincinnati with the 53rd overall pick. After one season with the Hoosiers, Aidan Morris signed a homegrown player contract with his parent MLS team, Columbus Crew.

== Team information ==
=== Roster ===
Players and squad numbers last updated on February 25, 2021. Appearances include all competitions.
Note: Flags indicate national team as has been defined under FIFA eligibility rules. Players may hold more than one non-FIFA nationality.

No.	Name	Nat	Position(s)	Year	Height	Weight	Hometown	Previous school (college)	Previous club	MLS rights
0	Bryant Pratt	(United States)	GK	R-So.	6 ft 2 in (1.88 m)	190	Columbus, Ohio	Bishop Watterson	Ohio Premier	—N/a
1	Roman Celentano	(United States)	GK	So.	6 ft 3 in (1.91 m)	200	Naperville, Illinois	Neuqua Valley	Chicago Sockers	Chicago Fire
2	Joey Maher	(United States)	DF	Fr.	6 ft 2 in (1.88 m)	160	Caseyville, Illinois	Althoff Catholic	Saint Louis FC	—N/a
3	Lawson Redmon	(United States)	DF	Fr.	5 ft 10 in (1.78 m)	160	Glen Carbon, Illinois	Edwardsville	Saint Louis FC	—N/a
4	A.J. Palazzolo	(United States)	FW	R-Sr.	6 ft 1 in (1.85 m)	165	St. Louis, Missouri	Christian Brothers College	Saint Louis FC	—N/a
5	Daniel Munie	(United States)	DF	So.	6 ft 0 in (1.83 m)	180	Maryland Heights, Missouri	Parkway North	Saint Louis FC	—N/a
7	Victor Bezerra	(Argentina)	FW	So.	6 ft 0 in (1.83 m)	175	Chicago, Illinois	Jones College Prep	Chicago Fire	Chicago Fire
8	Joe Schmidt	(United States)	MF	R-Jr.	5 ft 9 in (1.75 m)	165	Bainbridge Township, Ohio	University School	Cleveland Internationals	—N/a
9	Thomas Warr	(United States)	FW	Sr.	6 ft 0 in (1.83 m)	175	Zionsville, Indiana	Zionsville	Indiana Fire	Chicago Fire
10	Tommy Mihalić	(Serbia)	FW	Fr.	5 ft 11 in (1.80 m)	165	Skokie, Illinois	Niles North	FC United	—N/a
11	Nyk Sessock	(United States)	DF	Jr.	5-7	150	Philadelphia, Pennsylvania	YSC Academy (Pitt)	Philadelphia Union	Philadelphia Union
12	Quinten Helmer	(Netherlands)	MF	R-Fr.	6-0	155	Amsterdam, Netherlands	St. Michael College	AZ Alkmaar	—N/a
13	Emerson Nieto	(United States)	MF	Fr.	5-10	150	Fort Wayne, Indiana	Bishop Dwenger	Indiana Fire	Chicago Fire
14	Maouloune Goumballe	(Senegal)	FW	So.	6-2	163	Cincinnati, Ohio	Walnut Hills	Columbus Crew	Columbus Crew
15	Kyle Folds	(United States)	MF	Fr.	6-2	200	Berea, Ohio	St. Ignatius	Indiana Fire	Chicago Fire
16	Lukas Hummel	(United States)	DF	Fr.	5-11	160	Fenton, Missouri	Rockwood Summit	Saint Louis FC	—N/a
17	Herbert Endeley	(United States)	FW	So.	5-10	152	Blaine, Minnesota	Totino-Grace	Minneapolis United	Minnesota United
18	Ryan Wittenbrink	(United States)	FW	R-So.	6-1	165	Libertyville, Illinois	Libertyville	FC United	—N/a
19	Brett Bebej	(United States)	DF	So.	6-0	153	Shorewood, Illinois	Minooka	Chicago Fire	Chicago Fire
20	Ben Yeagley	(United States)	MF	R-So.	5-9	150	Bloomington, Indiana	Bloomington South	Alliance FC	—N/a
21	Spencer Glass	(United States)	DF	R-Sr.	6-0	165	Fort Wayne, Indiana	Carroll (IN)	Indiana Fire	Chicago Fire
22	Ian Black	(United States)	FW	R-Sr.	5-10	165	Dublin, Ohio	Dublin Jerome	Club Ohio	—N/a
23	Isaac Sarosy	(United States)	DF	R-So.	5-11	170	Fair Oaks, Indiana	Andrean	Indiana Fire	Chicago Fire
24	Andrew Goldsworthy	(United States)	DF	R-Fr.	6-1	180	Bloomington, Indiana	Bloomington North	Indiana Fire	Chicago Fire
25	Trey Kapsalis	(United States)	MF	R-So.	5-7	140	Fishers, Indiana	Cathedral	Indy Premier	—N/a
26	Nate Ward	(United States)	FW	Fr.	5-11	160	Connellsville, Pennsylvania	Greensburg Central Catholic	Beadling SC	—N/a
27	Alex McGill	(United States)	MF	R-Fr.	6-0	160	Columbus, Indiana	Columbus North	Indiana Fire	Chicago Fire
28	Grant Yeagley	(United States)	MF	Fr.	6-0	160	Bloomington, Indiana	Bloomington South	Alliance FC Academy	—N/a
29	Luke Boha	(United States)	MF	So.	5-11	150	Bloomington, Indiana	Center Grove	Alliance FC	—N/a
32	Austin Himebaugh	(United States)	GK	Fr.	6-2	175	Bloomington, Indiana	Bloomington North	Alliance FC	—N/a

=== Coaching staff ===
2020 Indiana Hoosiers men's soccer coaching staff
Name	Position	Seasons at Indiana	Alma mater
Todd Yeagley	Head Coach	11	Indiana (1994)
Kevin Robson	Assistant Coach	6	Indiana (2007)
Danny O'Rourke	Assistant Coach	3	Indiana (2004)
Christian Lomeli	Assistant Coach	2	Indiana (2008)

== Player movement ==
=== Transfers ===
Name	Nat.	No.	Pos.	Height	Year	Hometown	Notes
Nyk Sessock	USA	11	DF	5 ft 7 in (1.70 m)	Junior	Philadelphia, PA	Transferred from Pitt

== Competitive ==
=== Big Ten regular season ===
==== Results summary ====
Overall								Home						Away					
Pld	W	D	L	GF	GA	GD	Pts	W	D	L	GF	GA	GD	W	D	L	GF	GA	GD
2	2	0	0	6	0	+6	6	1	0	0	3	0	+3	1	0	0	3	0	+3

Last updated: February 25, 2021.
Source: IU Soccer

==== Results by round ====
Matchday	1	2	3	4	5	6	7	8	9	10
Stadium	N	N	A	H	A	H	A	H	A	H
Result	W	W	L							
Position	2	1	3							

Updated to match(es) played on February 25, 2021. Source: Big Ten Conference
A = Away; H = Home; N = Neutral; W = Win; D = Draw; L = Loss; P = Postponed

==== Match results ====
February 19, 2021 1	Indiana	3–0	Wisconsin	Westfield, Indiana
13:00 EST	Bezerra 39', 43'; Warr 49'	Report	Pauls (yellow card) 44'; Kappelsberger (yellow card) 86'	Stadium: Grand Park; Attendance: 0 Referee: Sorin Stoica

February 23, 2021 2	Ohio State	0–3	Indiana	Westfield, Indiana
14:00 EST		Report	Bezerra (yellow card) 12' (goal) 62', 83'; Munie 48'	Stadium: Grand Park; Attendance: 0 Referee: Nicholas Balcer

February 27, 2021 3	Northwestern	1–0	Indiana	Evanston, Illinois
14:00 EST	Achara Jr. 88'	Report		Stadium: Martin Stadium

March 7, 2021 4	Indiana	Cancelled	Penn State	Bloomington, Indiana
13:00 EST		Report		Stadium: Bill Armstrong Stadium

March 11, 2021 5	Wisconsin	4-0	Indiana	Madison, Wisconsin
13:00 EST	Brett Bebej 26', 55'; Herbert Endeley 47'; Joe Schmidt 82'	Report		Stadium: Dan McClimon Stadium; Attendance: 106

March 15, 2021 6	Indiana	2-1	Michigan State	Bloomington, Indiana
14:00 EDT	Victor Bezerra 62'; Daniel Munie 88'	Report	Luke Morrell 25'	Stadium: Bill Armstrong Stadium; Attendance: 0

March 19, 2021 7	Rutgers	0-3	Indiana	Piscataway, New Jersey
13:00 EDT		Report	Victor Bezerra 6'; Ryan Wittenbrink 63', 80'	Stadium: Yurcak Field; Attendance: 72

March 23, 2021 8	Indiana	3-0	Northwestern	Bloomington, Indiana
19:00 EDT	Nate Ward 11'; Maouloune Goumballe 20'; Herbert Endeley 51'	Report		Stadium: Bill Armstrong Stadium; Attendance: 0

March 27, 2021 9	Michigan	0-1 (a.e.t.)	Indiana	Ann Arbor, Michigan
19:00 EDT		Report	Ryan Wittenbrink 101'	Stadium: U-M Soccer Stadium; Attendance: 50

April 4, 2021 10	Indiana	Cancelled	Maryland	Bloomington, Indiana
19:00 EDT		Report		Stadium: Bill Armstrong Stadium

=== Big Ten Tournament ===
April 10, 2021 Quarterfinals	Indiana	3-0	Northwestern	Bloomington, Indiana
19:00 EDT	Victor Bezerra 7' (pen.), 73'; Ryan Wittenbrink 43'			Stadium: Bill Armstrong Stadium; Attendance: 0

April 14, 2021 Semifinals	Indiana	2-0	Maryland	Bloomington, Indiana
19:30 EDT	Victor Bezerra 47', 56'			Stadium: Bill Armstrong Stadium; Attendance: 0

April 17, 2021 Finals	Indiana	1-1 (a.e.t.) (3–2 p)	Penn State	Bloomington, Indiana
17:00 EDT	Victor Bezerra 40'		Liam Butts 82'	Stadium: Bill Armstrong Stadium; Attendance: 0
	Penalties
	Thomas Warr (penalty scored); Joe Schmidt (penalty scored); Victor Bezerra (penalty scored); Quinten Helmer (penalty missed)		Andrew Privett (penalty missed); Daniel Bloyou (penalty missed); Peter Mangione (penalty scored); Seth Kuhn (penalty scored); Callum Pritchatt (penalty missed)

=== NCAA Tournament ===
May 2, 2021 Second round	(3) Indiana	1-1 (a.e.t.) (3–1 p)	St. Francis Brooklyn	Wilmington, North Carolina
17:00 EDT	Victor Bezerra 35'		77' El Mahdi Youssoufi	Stadium: UNCW Soccer Stadium; Attendance: 250
	Penalties
	Thomas Warr (penalty scored); Joe Schmidt (penalty missed); Victor Bezerra (penalty scored); Ryan Wittenbrink (penalty scored)		(penalty missed) Sokol Ymeraj; (penalty missed) Khaled Abdella; (penalty scored) El Mahdi Youssoufi; (penalty missed) Nicolas Molina

May 6, 2021 Third Round	(3) Indiana	2-1	Marquette	Cary, North Carolina
18:00 EDT	Maouloune Goumballe 79'; Herbert Endeley 70'		43' AJ Franklin	Stadium: WakeMed Soccer Park; Attendance: 86

May 10, 2021 Quarterfinals	(3) Indiana	2-0	(6) Seton Hall	Cary, North Carolina
17:00 EDT	Ryan Wittenbrink 43'; Thomas Warr 57'			Stadium: WakeMed Soccer Park; Attendance: 68

May 14, 2021 Semifinals	(2) Pittsburgh	0-1	(3) Indiana	Cary, North Carolina
20:30 EDT			Herbert Endeley 79'	Stadium: WakeMed Soccer Park; Attendance: 2,667

May 17, 2021 Championship	Marshall	1-0 (a.e.t.)	(3) Indiana	Cary, North Carolina
21:15 EDT	Jamil Roberts 98'			Stadium: WakeMed Soccer Park; Attendance: 5,000

== Rankings ==
Ranking movement Legend: ██ Improvement in ranking. ██ Decrease in ranking. ██ Not ranked the previous week. RV=Others receiving votes.
Poll	Pre	Wk 1	Wk 2	Wk 3	Wk 4	Wk 5	Wk 6	Wk 7	Wk 8	Wk 9	Wk 10	Wk 11	Wk 12	Wk 13	Wk 14	Wk 15	Wk 16	Final
United Soccer	None Released													None Released				
Top Drawer Soccer	7	7	7	7														
Soccer America	None Released																	
CollegeSoccerNews.com	6	6	6	6														

== 2021 MLS SuperDraft ==
Player	Round	Pick	Position	MLS club	Ref.
Joshua Penn	1	10	FW	Inter Miami	
