= 2020 Maryland Terrapins men's soccer team =

American college soccer season

2020 Maryland Terrapins men's soccer

NCAA Tournament, second round
- Conference: Big Ten Conference
- Record: 4–5–2 (4–3–1 Big Ten)
- Head coach: Sasho Cirovski (27th season)
- Assistant coaches: Jake Pace (3rd season); Miles Vaughn (1st season); Casey Beyers (2nd season)
- Home stadium: Ludwig Field

2020 Big Ten Conference men's soccer standings
	Conf.					Overall
Team	W		L		T	W		L		T
No. 2 Indiana ‡	7	–	1	–	0	12	–	2	–	2
No. 11 Penn State +	6	–	1	–	1	10	–	2	–	2
Michigan	5	–	3	–	1	6	–	4	–	1
Maryland +	4	–	3	–	1	4	–	5	–	2
Rutgers	4	–	4	–	0	4	–	4	–	1
Michigan State	4	–	6	–	0	4	–	7	–	0
Ohio State	3	–	5	–	1	3	–	6	–	1
Northwestern	2	–	7	–	1	2	–	8	–	1
Wisconsin	2	–	7	–	1	2	–	7	–	1
‡ – 2020 B1G Tournament champion + – Also invited to the 2020 NCAA Tournament; As of May 28, 2021; Rankings from United Soccer Coaches; Source: Big Ten

The 2020 Maryland Terrapins men's soccer team represented the University of Maryland, College Park during the 2020 NCAA Division I men's soccer season. It was the 75th season of the university fielding a program. The Terrapins were led by 28th year head coach, Sasho Cirovski.

== Effects of the Covid-19 pandemic ==
On August 11, 2020, the Big Ten Conference postponed all fall sports, with the hope to play in the spring.

On November 4, 2020, the NCAA approved a plan for college soccer to be played in the spring.

== Roster ==
Source: Note: Flags indicate national team as defined under FIFA eligibility rules; some limited exceptions apply. Players may hold more than one non-FIFA nationality.

No.	Pos.	Nation	Player
0	GK	(United States) USA	Craig Eichelberger
1	GK	(United States) USA	Jamie Lowell
3	DF	(Japan) JPN	Kento Abe
3	DF	(Australia) AUS	Ryan Blumberg
4	DF	(Canada) CAN	Marques Antoine
5	DF	(Germany) GER	Alex Nitzl
6	MF	(Slovenia) SVN	David Kovačić
7	FW	(South Korea) KOR	Paul Bin
8	MF	(United States) USA	Ben Bender
9	FW	(United States) USA	Justin Gielen
11	MF	(Canada) CAN	Malcolm Johnston
12	DF	(United States) USA	Brett St. Martin
13	FW	(Canada) CAN	Jacen Russell-Rowe

No.	Pos.	Nation	Player
14	FW	(Ghana) GHA	Joshua Bolma
15	FW	(United States) USA	Eric Matzelevich
16	MF	(United States) USA	Jacob Chakroun
18	DF	(United States) USA	Chris Rindov
19	MF	(New Zealand) NZL	Henry Hamilton
20	MF	(United States) USA	Justin Harris
21	MF	(United States) USA	Joe Suchecki
22	DF	(United States) USA	Nick Richardson
23	DF	(United States) USA	Isaac Ngobu
24	MF	(United States) USA	Mike Heitzmann
30	GK	(Venezuela) VEN	Alejandro Chacon
36	GK	(Germany) GER	Niklas Neumann
70	RW	(United States) USA	Brayan Padilla

== Schedule ==
=== Regular season ===
February 19, 2021	Penn State	3–2	Maryland	University Park, Pennsylvania
6:00 p.m. ET				Stadium: Jeffrey Field

February 27, 2021	Maryland	0–1	Ohio State	College Park, Maryland
2:00 p.m. ET				Stadium: Ludwig Field

March 3, 2021	Rutgers	2–0	Maryland	Piscataway, New Jersey
12:00 p.m. ET				Stadium: Yurcak Field

March 7, 2021	Maryland	1–0	Wisconsin	College Park, Maryland
2:30 p.m. ET				Stadium: Ludwig Field

March 11, 2021	Michigan	1–2	Maryland	Ann Arbor, Michigan
11:00 a.m. ET				Stadium: U-M Soccer Stadium

March 19, 2021	Maryland	2–1	Michigan State	College Park, Maryland
2:00 p.m. ET				Stadium: Ludwig Field

March 23, 2021	Maryland	Cancelled	Rutgers	College Park, Maryland
12:00 p.m. ET		Report		Stadium: Ludwig Field

March 27, 2021	Northwestern	1–2	Maryland	Evanston, Illinois
4:00 p.m. ET				Stadium: Lanny and Sharon Martin Stadium

March 31, 2021	Maryland	2–2 (a.e.t.)	Penn State	College Park, Maryland
12:00 p.m. ET				Stadium: Ludwig Field

April 4, 2021	Indiana	Cancelled	Maryland	Bloomington, Indiana
1:00 p.m. ET		Report		Stadium: Bill Armstrong Stadium

=== Postseason ===
==== Big Ten Tournament ====
April 10, 2021 Quarterfinals	Maryland	1–1 (a.e.t.) (5–4 p)	Rutgers	College Park, Maryland
1:00 p.m. ET				Stadium: Ludwig Field

April 14, 2021 Quarterfinals	Indiana	2–0	Maryland	Bloomington, Indiana
7:30 p.m. ET				Stadium: Bill Armstrong Stadium

==== NCAA Tournament ====
May 2, 2021 Second round	Maryland	1–2	Missouri State	Wilmington, North Carolina
1:00 p.m. EDT				Stadium: UNCW Soccer Stadium
