= 2020 Penn State Nittany Lions men's soccer team =

Penn State Nittany Lions men's soccer 2020 season

2020 Penn State Nittany Lions men's soccer

NCAA Tournament, Sweet Sixteen
- Conference: Big Ten Conference
- U. Soc. Coaches poll: No. 11
- TopDrawerSoccer.com: No. 12
- Record: 10–2–2 (6–1–1 Big Ten)
- Head coach: Jeff Cook (3rd season)
- Assistant coaches: Greg Dalby (3rd season); Methembe Ndlovu (1st season); Clint Long (1st season)
- Home stadium: Jeffrey Field

2020 Big Ten Conference men's soccer standings
	Conf.					Overall
Team	W		L		T	W		L		T
No. 2 Indiana ‡	7	–	1	–	0	12	–	2	–	2
No. 11 Penn State +	6	–	1	–	1	10	–	2	–	2
Michigan	5	–	3	–	1	6	–	4	–	1
Maryland +	4	–	3	–	1	4	–	5	–	2
Rutgers	4	–	4	–	0	4	–	4	–	1
Michigan State	4	–	6	–	0	4	–	7	–	0
Ohio State	3	–	5	–	1	3	–	6	–	1
Northwestern	2	–	7	–	1	2	–	8	–	1
Wisconsin	2	–	7	–	1	2	–	7	–	1
‡ – 2020 B1G Tournament champion + – Also invited to the 2020 NCAA Tournament; As of May 28, 2021; Rankings from United Soccer Coaches; Source: Big Ten

The 2020 Penn State Nittany Lions men's soccer team represented Pennsylvania State University during the 2020 NCAA Division I men's soccer season and the 2020 Big Ten Conference men's soccer season. As a result of the COVID-19 pandemic, the 2020 fall season was postponed to the spring, and began on February 19, 2021. It was the program's 108th season fielding a men's varsity soccer team, and their 30th season in the Big Ten Conference. The 2020 season is Jeff Cook's third year at the helm.

== Background ==
The 2020 season is the Nittany Lions' 108th season as a varsity soccer program, and their 30th season playing in the Big Ten Conference. The team is led by third year head coach, Jeff Cook, who had previously served as an assistant coach for the professional soccer team, Bethlehem Steel of USL Championship.

== Player movement ==
=== Departures ===
Name	Number	Position	Height	Weight	Year	Hometown	Reason for departure
Brandon Hackenberg	3	DF	6 ft 1 in (1.85 m)	175	Redshirt Senior	Reading, PA	Drafted by Orlando City SC with the 22nd pick of the 2021 MLS SuperDraft.
Aaron Molloy	8	MF	5 ft 11 in (1.80 m)	165	Senior	Dublin, Ireland	Graduated; drafted by Portland Timbers with the 16th pick of the 2020 MLS SuperDraft.
Will Campbell	20	DF	6 ft 1 in (1.85 m)	178	Graduate Student	Wallingford, PA	Graduated
Kyle Perno	23	FW	5 ft 10 in (1.78 m)	165	Senior	New Hyde Park, NY	Graduated
Christian Sload	24	FW	6 ft 3 in (1.91 m)	170	Senior	Reading, PA	Graduated

Last updated: May 14, 2021
Source: Penn State Athletics

=== Arrivals ===
Name	Nat.	Hometown	High School	Club	TDS Rating
David Adelsberg; GK	USA	Newport Beach, CA		Pateadores SC	3/5 stars
Femi Awodesu; DF	USA	Philadelphia, PA		Tampa Bay Rowdies	3/5 stars
Tyger Evans; DF	USA	Philadelphia, PA		Philadelphia Union Academy	3/5 stars
Peter Mangione; MF	USA	Dulaney, MD		Baltimore Armour	3/5 stars
Jace Orvos; FW	USA	Belle Mead, NJ		PDA (Academy)	2/5 stars

- Last updated: May 14, 2021
- Source: TopDrawerSoccer

=== Transfers ===
Name	Nat.	No.	Pos.	Height	Year	Hometown	Notes
Alex Morgret	USA	13	GK	6 ft 0 in (1.83 m)	Junior	Hummelstown, PA	Transferred from Saint Francis
Daniel Bloyou	Ghana	9	FW	5 ft 8 in (1.73 m)	Junior	Ghana	Transferred from Old Dominion

=== 2021 MLS SuperDraft ===
Player	Round	Pick	Position	MLS club	Ref.
Brandon Hackenberg	1	22	DF	Orlando City SC	

== Squad ==
=== Roster ===
As of May 14, 2021

Note: Flags indicate national team as defined under FIFA eligibility rules; some limited exceptions apply. Players may hold more than one non-FIFA nationality.

No.	Pos.	Nation	Player
1	GK	USA	Kris Shakes
2	DF	USA	Mason Deeds
3	DF	USA	Brandon Hackenberg (captain)
4	DF	CAN	Jalen Watson
5	MF	ENG	Callum Pritchatt
6	MF	USA	Andrew Privett
7	FW	USA	Liam Butts
8	MF	USA	Peter Mangione
9	FW	GHA	Daniel Bloyou
10	MF	USA	Seth Kuhn
11	MF	USA	Pierre Reedy (captain)
12	MF	USA	Nicholas Rieple
13	GK	USA	Alex Morgret
14	DF	USA	Michael Gaines
15	DF	USA	Adam Laundree
16	MF	USA	Keegan Ness
17	DF	USA	Tyger Evans
18	DF	USA	Alex Stevenson
19	MF	USA	Omar Ozbay
20	DF	GHA	Edward Mensah
21	MF	USA	Kyle May
22	MF	CRC	Daniel González
23	FW	USA	Jace Orvos
24	DF	USA	Jose Palomeque
25	DF	USA	Dax Hoffman
26	FW	USA	Josh Dabora
27	GK	USA	Owen Elliott
28	DF	USA	Femi Awodesu
30	GK	USA	David Adelsberg

=== Personnel ===
Front office
Athletic Director	Sandy Barbour
Deputy Director of Athletics	Lynn Holleran
Deputy Director of Athletics	Scott Sidwell
Coaching staff
Head coach	Jeff Cook
Assistant coach	Greg Dalby
Assistant coach	Methembe Ndlovu
Assistant coach	Clint Long

Last updated: January 1, 2021
Source: Penn State Athletics

== Schedule ==
Date Time, TV	Rank^{#}	Opponent^{#}	Result	Record	Team events	Opponent events	Site (Attendance) City, State
Regular season
February 19; 6:00 p.m., BTN+	No. 23	No. 21 Maryland	W 3–2	1–0–0 (1–0–0)	A. Privett 5'; B. Hackenberg (yellow card) 18'; P. Reedy 25'; Mangione 34'; A. Stevenson (yellow card) 38'; K. May (yellow card) 74'	B. Padilla (yellow card) 82'; I. Ngobu (yellow card) 16'; J. Suchecki 38'; P. Bin (yellow card) 49'; Russell-Rowe 73'; (yellow card) 85'; B. St. Martin (yellow card) 86'	Holuba Hall (100); State College, PA
February 23; 12:00 p.m., BTN+	No. 20	at Rutgers	W 2–1	2–0–0 (2–0–0)	D. Bloyou 8'; J. Watson (yellow card) 11'; S. Kuhn (yellow card) 34'; Mangione 35'	C. Sotack (yellow card) 16'; J. Temple 32' (pen.); J. Temple (yellow card) 34'; C. Sotack (red card) 49'; V. Borden (yellow card) 85'	Iron Peaks Sports & Events (0); Piscataway, NJ
February 27; 2:00 p.m., BTN+		Michigan State	L 1–0	2–1–0 (2–1–0)	D. Bloyou (yellow card) 59'; K. May (yellow card) 60'; B. Hackenberg (yellow card) 62'	O. Ogunwale (yellow card) 5'; J. Zugay (yellow card) 75'; J. Beck 86'	Holuba Hall (100); State College, PA
POSTPONED		No. 9 Michigan		2–1–0 (2–1–0)	n/a	n/a	Ann Arbor, MI
POSTPONED		at No. 19 Indiana		2–1–0 (2–1–0)	n/a	n/a	Bloomington, IN
March 15; 12:00 p.m., BTN		Rutgers	W 4–2	3–1–0 (3–1–0)	D. Bloyou 24'; S. Kuhn 27'; A. Laundree (yellow card) 42'; Tyger Evans (yellow card) 44'; P. Reedy 47'; D. Bloyou 76'; K. May (yellow card) 79'	V. Borden (yellow card) 27'; R. Barry 33'; V. Borden 53'; K. Galloway (yellow card) 87'	Jeffrey Field (207); State College, PA
March 19; 1:00 p.m., BTN		at Northwestern	W 1-0	4–1–0 (4–1–0)	N. Rieple (yellow card) 82'; D. Bloyou 91'	none	Martin Stadium (20); Evanston, IL
March 23; 5:00 p.m., BTN+		No. 25 Ohio State	W 1-0	5–1–0 (5–1–0)	Mangione 74'; N. Rieple (yellow card) 89'	X. Green (yellow card) 24'; P. Grinstead (yellow card) 72'	Jeffrey Field (179); State College, PA
March 27; 2:00 p.m., BTN+		Wisconsin	W 1-0	6–1–0 (6–1–0)	D. Bloyou (yellow card) 72'; P. Reedy 86'	A. Akindele (yellow card) 36'; Z. Klancnik (yellow card) 57'; P. Yim (yellow card) 74'	Jeffrey Field (216); State College, PA
March 31; 12:00 p.m., BTN		at Maryland	T 2–2	6–1–1 (6–1–1)	Mangione 19'; J. Watson (yellow card) 75'; D. Bloyou (yellow card) 81'; P. Reedy 86'; F. Awodesu (yellow card) 91'	B. Bender 1'; (yellow card) 34'; C. Rindov (yellow card) 37'; M. Johnston 62'; J. Gielen (yellow card) 79'	Ludwig Field (100); College Park, MD
Big Ten Tournament
April 10; 12:00 p.m., BTN	No. 19 (2)	No. (7) Ohio State; Big Ten Tournament Quarterfinal	W 3-1	7–1–1 (6–1–1)	D. Bloyou 21'; T. Evans 72'; D. Bloyou 54'; P. Reedy (yellow card) 86'	D. Etling 87'	Jeffrey Field (256); State College, PA
April 14; 5:00 p.m., BTN	No. 14 (2)	No. 20 (3) Michigan; Big Ten Tournament Semifinal	W 4–1	8–1–1 (6–1–1)	D. Bloyou 6'; J. Watson (yellow card) 11'; Mangione 17' (pen.); F. Awodesu (yellow card) 35'; P. Reedy 62'; L. Butts 87'; P. Reedy (yellow card) 86'	J. Ragen (yellow card) 24'; J. Ragen 28'; M. Ybarra (yellow card) 43'; U. Farouk Osman (yellow card) 76'	Jeffrey Field (313); State College, PA
April 17; 5:00 p.m., BTN	No. 14 (2)	No. 3 (1) Indiana; Big Ten Tournament Championship	T 1–1 ^{3-2}	8–1–2 (6–1–1)	S. Kuhn (yellow card) 75'; L. Butts 81'; T. Evans (yellow card) 108'	V. Bezerra 39'; J. Maher (red card) 80'	Bill Armstrong Stadium (0); Bloomington, IN
NCAA Tournament
May 2*; 1:00 p.m., ESPN3	No. 12	vs. UMass; NCAA Tournament Second Round	W 4–1	9–1–2 (6–1–1)	Own Goal 9'; A. Stevenson 20'; K. Ness (yellow card) 23'; S. Kuhn 31'; A. Privett (yellow card) 64'; T. Evans 81'	Own Goal 52'; R. Levay (yellow card) 74'; B. Shepherd (yellow card) 78'	UNCG Soccer Stadium (167); Greensboro, NC
May 6*; 12:00 p.m., GOHEELSTV	No. 12	vs. No. 7 Georgetown; NCAA Tournament Sweet Sixteen	L 3-2	9–2–2 (6–1–1)	Mangione 12' (pen.); K. Shakes (yellow card) 53'; S. Kuhn (yellow card) 53'; D. Bloyou 58'; K. Shakes (red card) 90'	D. Polvara 8' (pen.); Z. Riviere 29'; M. Ngoh 44'	WakeMed Soccer Park (167); Cary, NC
*Non-conference game. ^{#}Rankings from United Soccer Coaches. (#) Tournament seedings in parentheses.

Source:Penn State Athletics

== Rankings ==
=== Preseason Big Ten poll ===
Penn State was predicted to finish 3rd in the Big Ten Conference.

Coaches' Poll
Predicted finish	Team
1	Indiana
2	Maryland
3	Penn State
4	Michigan
5	Michigan State
6	Northwestern
7	Rutgers
8	Wisconsin
9	Ohio State

=== Season Rankings ===
Ranking movement Legend: ██ Improvement in ranking. ██ Decrease in ranking. ██ Not ranked the previous week. RV=Others receiving votes.
Poll	Pre	Wk 1	Wk 2	Wk 3	Wk 4	Wk 5	Wk 6	Wk 7	Wk 8	Wk 9	Wk 10	Wk 11	Final
United Soccer	None Released				RV	RV	RV	NV	RV	19	14	12	11
Top Drawer Soccer	23	23	23	20	NV	NV	NV	NV	21	19	19	17	12
CollegeSoccerNews.com	21	21	21	13	15	15	15	15	12	11	10	10	10

== Statistics ==
=== Top scorers ===
Rank	Position	Number	Name	Total
1	FW	9	(Ghana) Daniel Bloyou	8
2	MF	8	(United States) Peter Mangione	6
3	MF	11	(United States) Pierre Reedy	5

- Last updated: May 7, 2020
- Source: Team Stats

=== Top assists ===
Rank	Position	Number	Name	Total
1	MF	8	(United States) Peter Mangione	6
T-2	MF	11	(United States) Pierre Reedy	4
T-2	FW	10	(United States) Seth Kuhn	4
3	DF	18	(United States) Alex Stevenson	3

- Last updated: May 7, 2020
- Source: Team Stats

== Honors and awards ==
=== Big Ten awards ===
Award	Name
All-Big Ten First Team	(Ghana) Daniel Bloyou
All-Big Ten First Team	(United States) Pierre Reedy
All-Big Ten Second Team	(United States) Seth Kuhn
All-Big Ten Second Team	(United States) Kris Shakes
All-Big Ten Freshman Team	(United States) Peter Mangione
Big Ten Sportsmanship Award Honorees	(United States) Nicholas Rieple

- Last updated: May 8, 2020
- Source: Big Ten 2020-21 Honors

=== Top Drawer Soccer awards ===
All-American Team
Award	Name
3rd Team	(United States) Pierre Reedy
3rd Team	(Ghana) Daniel Bloyou
Freshman Best XI Team
Award	Name
2nd Team	(United States) Peter Mangione
All-North Region
Award	Name
1st Team	(United States) Pierre Reedy
1st Team	(Ghana) Daniel Bloyou
1st Team	(United States) Brandon Hackenberg
2nd Team	(United States) Peter Mangione
Team of the Week
Week	Name
May 4	(United States) Peter Mangione
April 13	(Ghana) Daniel Bloyou
March 30	(United States) Brandon Hackenberg
March 30	(United States) Brandon Hackenberg
March 23	(Ghana) Daniel Bloyou
Preseason Best XI
Position	Name
FW	(United States) Liam Butts
DF	(United States) Brandon Hackenberg

- Last updated: May 14, 2020
- Source: TopDrawerSoccer

=== United Soccer Coaches awards ===
Scholar All-American
Award	Name
First Team	(United States) Pierre Reedy
First Team	(United States) Brandon Hackenberg
Second Team	(United States) Seth Kuhn

- Last updated: May 8, 2020
- Source: United Soccer Coaches
