= 2020 St. Francis Brooklyn Terriers men's soccer team =

2020 NCAA Division men's soccer team

2020 St. Francis Brooklyn Terriers men's soccer

NEC Regular Season Champions NEC Tournament Champions

NCAA Tournament, Second Round (1–1)
- Conference: Northeast Conference
- Record: 7–2–1 (5–1–1 NEC)
- Head coach: Tom Giovatto (14th season)

2020 Northeast Conference men's soccer standings
	Conf.					Overall
Team	W		L		T	W		L		T
St. Francis Brooklyn ‡	5	–	1	–	1	6	–	1	–	3
LIU	3	–	1	–	3	3	–	1	–	4
Central Connecticut	3	–	3	–	1	3	–	3	–	1
Merrimack ^{#}	2	–	1	–	2	2	–	1	–	2
Bryant	2	–	2	–	2	2	–	2	–	2
Fairleigh Dickinson	2	–	3	–	1	2	–	5	–	1
Mount St. Mary's	1	–	3	–	2	1	–	5	–	2
Sacred Heart	1	–	5	–	0	1	–	6	–	0
‡ – 2020 NEC Tournament champion + – Also invited to the 2020 NCAA tournament ^{#} – Ineligible for post-season (In transition); As of May 3, 2021; Rankings from United Soccer Coaches

The 2020 St. Francis Brooklyn Terriers men's soccer team represent St. Francis College during the 2020 NCAA Division I men's soccer season. The Terrier's home games are played at Brooklyn Bridge Park, Pier 5. The team has been a member of the Northeast Conference since 1981 and is coached by Tom Giovatto, who was in his fourteenth year at the helm of the Terriers.

Due to the COVID-19 pandemic the season was delayed to Spring 2021 and shortened to only 7 conference games. The Terriers finished regular season play at 5–1–1 and won the NEC Regular Season Championship. The NEC Tournament only featured #1 seed St. Francis Brooklyn and #2 seed LIU Sharks in a single-game championship, which St. Francis won in double overtime on penalty kicks. The Terriers then advanced to the 2020 NCAA Division I Men's Soccer Tournament where they defeated the Milwaukee Panthers in the first round. The Terriers then lost to nationally ranked Indiana in overtime in the second round of the tournament.

== 2020 squad ==
As of May 3, 2021. Note: Flags indicate national team as defined under FIFA eligibility rules; some limited exceptions apply. Players may hold more than one non-FIFA nationality.

No.	Pos.	Nation	Player
00	GK	RUS	Ruslan Nigmatullin
0	GK	USA	Mateo Green
1	GK	WAL	Callum James
3	DF	USA	Mamadou Diallo
4	DF	NOR	Harald Sollund
5	DF	USA	Vicente Gallardo
6	MF	CAN	Xavier Laneuville
7	MF	SRB	Ivan Tapuskovic
8	MF	USA	Dennis Coke, Jr.
9	FW	USA	Khaled Abdella
10	FW	MAR	El Mahdi Youssoufi
11	FW	ARG	Nicolas Molina
12	DF	SUI	Michael Nwokeabia
14	DF	AUS	Ridwan Hannan

No.	Pos.	Nation	Player
15	DF	USA	Domenico Pugliese
17	FW	USA	Corrado Carbone
18	MF	ENG	Jaydon Humphries
19	MF	USA	Ramchwy Saint Vil
20	MF	ALB	Sokol Ymeraj
21	MF	MAR	Badr Mesrar
22	MF	USA	Omar Gawish
23	MF	USA	Andrew Adelhardt
24	DF	USA	Derek Martinez
25	MF	USA	Austin Rafter
27	DF	USA	Johan Grande-Rojas
28	MF	USA	Tyler Swaby
30	GK	ESP	David Santiago

Captains in bold

== Schedule ==
=== Northeast Conference ===
March 1, 2021 1	Merrimack	2–1 (a.e.t.)	St. Francis Brooklyn	North Andover, MA
4:00PM EST	Felice Genuario (yellow card) 24'; Frantz Pierrot 69' (pen.); Sean O'Neill (yellow card) 94'; Nick Bernardi (yellow card) 95'; Frantz Pierrot 101'	Report	(yellow card) 11' Sokol Ymeraj; (yellow card) 33' El Mahdi Youssoufi; 37' Nicolas Molina; (yellow card) 50' El Mahdi Youssoufi	Stadium: Martone-Mejail Field

March 8, 2021 2	St. Francis Brooklyn	1–0	Central Connecticut	Brooklyn, NY
1:00PM EST	Dennis Coke 48'; Domenico Pugliese (yellow card) 63'	Report	(yellow card) 26' Kyle Halehale	Stadium: Brooklyn Bridge Park; Referee: Emmanuel Tadonkeng

March 15, 2021 3	St. Francis Brooklyn	2–1	Mount St. Mary's	Brooklyn, NY
1:00PM EST	Harald Sollund 42'; Ramchwy Saint Vil 77'; Badr Mesrar (yellow card) 79'; Mateo Green (yellow card) 84'; Sokol Ymeraj (yellow card) 88'	Report	84' Marcos Lucero; (yellow card) 85' Alek Wroblewski; (yellow card) 88' Gavin Watt	Stadium: Brooklyn Bridge Park; Referee: David Breckner

March 22, 2021 4	Bryant	1–0	St. Francis Brooklyn	Smithfield, RI
6:00PM EST	Andrew Buss (yellow card) 73'	Report	1' Sokol Ymeraj; (yellow card) 30' Ramchwy Saint Vil; (yellow card) 70' Nicolas Molina	Stadium: Beirne Stadium; Referee: Stephen Dileo

March 29, 2021 5	Sacred Heart	1–2	St. Francis Brooklyn	Fairfield, CT
3:00PM EST	Eduardo Costa (yellow card) 54'; Altin Celaj 65' (pen.)	Report	57' Nicolas Molina; (yellow card) 70' Domenico Pugliese; 81' Ramchwy Saint Vil	Stadium: Park Ave Field; Referee: Louis Labbadia

April 5, 2021 6	St. Francis Brooklyn	2–1	Fairleigh Dickinson	Brooklyn, NY
1:00PM EST	Nicolas Molina 67' (pen.); Khaled Abdella 81'; Domenico Pugliese (yellow card) 83'	Report	79' (pen.) Ideal Shefqeti	Stadium: Brooklyn Bridge Park; Referee: Artur Sibiga

April 12, 2021 7	St. Francis Brooklyn	0–0 (a.e.t.)	LIU	Brooklyn, NY
1:00PM EST	Johan Grande-Rojas (yellow card) 26'; Sokol Ymeraj (yellow card) 32'; Dennis Coke (yellow card) 42'; Domenico Pugliese (yellow card) 46'; Badr Mesrar (yellow card) 60'; El Mahdi Youssoufi (yellow card) 109'; Ramchwy Saint Vil (yellow card) 109'	Report	(yellow card) 26' Emil Jaaskelainen; (yellow card) 60' Fridtjof Andberg; (yellow card) 73' Selcuk Kahveci	Stadium: Brooklyn Bridge Park; Referee: Abdrea Pileri
Note: Battle of Brooklyn Game

=== Northeast conference tournament ===
April 16, 2021 Championship	#1 St. Francis Brooklyn	0–0 (a.e.t.) (6–5 p)	#2 LIU Brooklyn	Brooklyn, NY
1:00PM EST	El Mahdi Youssoufi (yellow card) 24'	Report	(yellow card) 105' Fridtjof Andberg; (yellow card) 109' Emil Jaaskelainen; (yellow card) 110' Demetri Skoumbakis	Stadium: Brooklyn Bridge Park; Referee: Deochand Parbhudial
	Penalties
	Sokol Ymeraj (penalty scored); Ivan Tapuskovic (penalty scored); Khaled Abdella (penalty scored); Nicolas Molina (penalty scored); Dennis Coke (penalty missed); Callum James (penalty scored); Ridwan Hannan (penalty missed); Domenico Pugliese (penalty missed); Vicente Gallardo (penalty scored)		(penalty missed) Emil Jaaskelainen; (penalty scored) Jonas Dovland; (penalty scored) Fridtjof Andberg; (penalty scored) Michael Mollica; (penalty scored) Selcuk Kahveci; (penalty scored) Xavi Verdu; (penalty missed) Demetri Skoumbakis; (penalty missed) Vasilios Brisnovalis; (penalty missed) Andre Puente

=== NCAA Division I Men's Soccer Championship ===
April 29, 2021	Milwaukee	1–2 (a.e.t.)	St. Francis Brooklyn	Wilmington, North Carolina
6:00 PM EDT	Raul Medina 61' (pen.)	Report	(yellow card) 44' Ridwan Hannan; (yellow card) 49' Harald Sollund; (yellow card) 88' Mamadou Diallo; 88' El Mahdi Youssoufi; 104' Ivan Tapuskovic	Stadium: UNCW Soccer Stadium; Attendance: 138; Referee: Elvis Osmanovic

May 2, 2021	^{(3)} Indiana	1–1 (a.e.t.) (3–1 p)	St. Francis Brooklyn	Wilmington, North Carolina
5:00 PM EDT	Joe Schmidt (yellow card) 26'; Victor Bezerra 35'; Nate Ward (yellow card) 92'	Report	(yellow card) 41' Sokol Ymeraj; 77' El Mahdi Youssoufi	Stadium: UNCW Soccer Stadium; Referee: Carmen Serbio
	Penalties
	Thomas Warr (penalty scored); Joe Schmidt (penalty missed); Victor Bezerra (penalty scored); Ryan Wittenbrink (penalty scored)		(penalty missed) Sokol Ymeraj; (penalty missed) Khaled Abdella; (penalty scored) El Mahdi Youssoufi; (penalty missed) Nicolas Molina

== See also ==
- St. Francis Brooklyn Terriers men's soccer
- 2020 NCAA Division I men's soccer season
- Northeast Conference Men's Soccer Tournament
- 2020 NCAA Division I Men's Soccer Tournament
