= 2020 Big Ten men's soccer tournament =

- Classification: Division I
- Teams: 8
- Matches: 7
- First round site: Top Seed Campus Site
- Quarterfinals site: Higher seeds
- Semifinals site: Higher seeds
- Finals site: Bill Armstrong Stadium; Bloomington, Indiana
- Champions: Indiana (15th title)
- Winning coach: Todd Yeagley (4th title)
- Broadcast: BTN

2020 Big Ten Conference men's soccer standings
	Conf.					Overall
Team	W		L		T	W		L		T
No. 2 Indiana ‡	7	–	1	–	0	12	–	2	–	2
No. 11 Penn State +	6	–	1	–	1	10	–	2	–	2
Michigan	5	–	3	–	1	6	–	4	–	1
Maryland +	4	–	3	–	1	4	–	5	–	2
Rutgers	4	–	4	–	0	4	–	4	–	1
Michigan State	4	–	6	–	0	4	–	7	–	0
Ohio State	3	–	5	–	1	3	–	6	–	1
Northwestern	2	–	7	–	1	2	–	8	–	1
Wisconsin	2	–	7	–	1	2	–	7	–	1
‡ – 2020 B1G Tournament champion + – Also invited to the 2020 NCAA Tournament; As of May 28, 2021; Rankings from United Soccer Coaches; Source: Big Ten

The 2020 Big Ten Conference men's soccer tournament was the 30th edition of the tournament. As the tournament champion, Indiana earned the Big Ten Conference's automatic berth into the 2020 NCAA Division I men's soccer tournament.

Due to the COVID-19 pandemic, the tournament was rescheduled from November 2020 to April 2021, and reduced from nine teams to eight teams.

== Seeding ==
Seeding was determined by regular season conference record points per game.

Seed	School	Conference	Tiebreaker
1	Indiana	7–1–0	
2	Penn State	6–1–1	
3	Michigan	5–3–1	
4	Maryland	4–3–1	
5	Rutgers	4–4–0	PPG vs. MSU
6	Michigan State	4–6–0	PPG vs. RUT
7	Ohio State	3–5–1	
8	Northwestern	2–7–1	

== Bracket ==
Quarterfinals; April 10
1	Indiana	3
8	Northwestern	0
4	Maryland (p)	1 (5)
5	Rutgers	1 (4)
3	Michigan	1
6	Michigan State	0
2	Penn State	3
7	Ohio State	1

Semifinals; April 14
1	Indiana	2
4	Maryland	0
3	Michigan	1
2	Penn State	4

Championship; April 17
1	Indiana	1 (3)
2	Penn State	1 (2)
