= Roman Celentano =

American soccer player (born 2000)

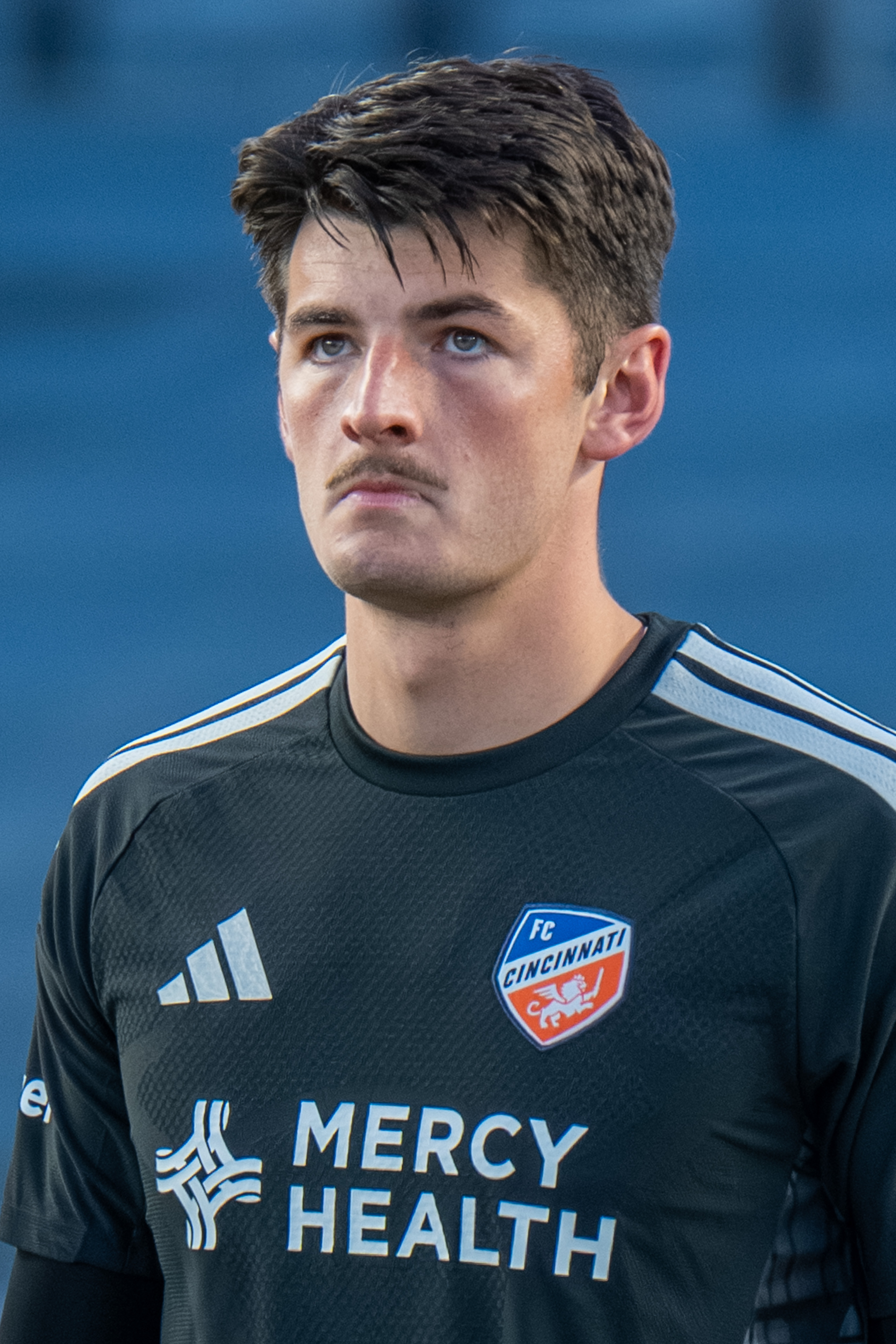
- Celentano with FC Cincinnati in 2026

Personal information
- Full name: Roman Marcello Celentano
- Date of birth: September 14, 2000 (age 26)
- Place of birth: Naperville, Illinois, U.S.
- Height: 6 ft 1 in (1.85 m)
- Position: Goalkeeper

Team information
- Current team: FC Cincinnati
- Number: 18

Youth career
- 2016–2019: Chicago Sockers

College career
Years	Team	Apps	(Gls)
2019–2021	Indiana Hoosiers	39	(0)

Senior career*
Years	Team	Apps	(Gls)
2022–	FC Cincinnati	149	(0)
2022	→ FC Cincinnati 2 (loan)	2	(0)
- * Club domestic league appearances and goals as of 02:38, November 9, 2026 (UTC)

Roman Marcello Celentano (born September 14, 2000) is an American professional soccer player who plays as a goalkeeper for Major League Soccer club FC Cincinnati.

== Early life ==
Roman Celentano was born on September 14, 2000, to Marcello and Manuela Celentano. He is from Naperville, Illinois, where he attended Neuqua Valley High School. He has two siblings, named Julian and Remi.

== Club career ==
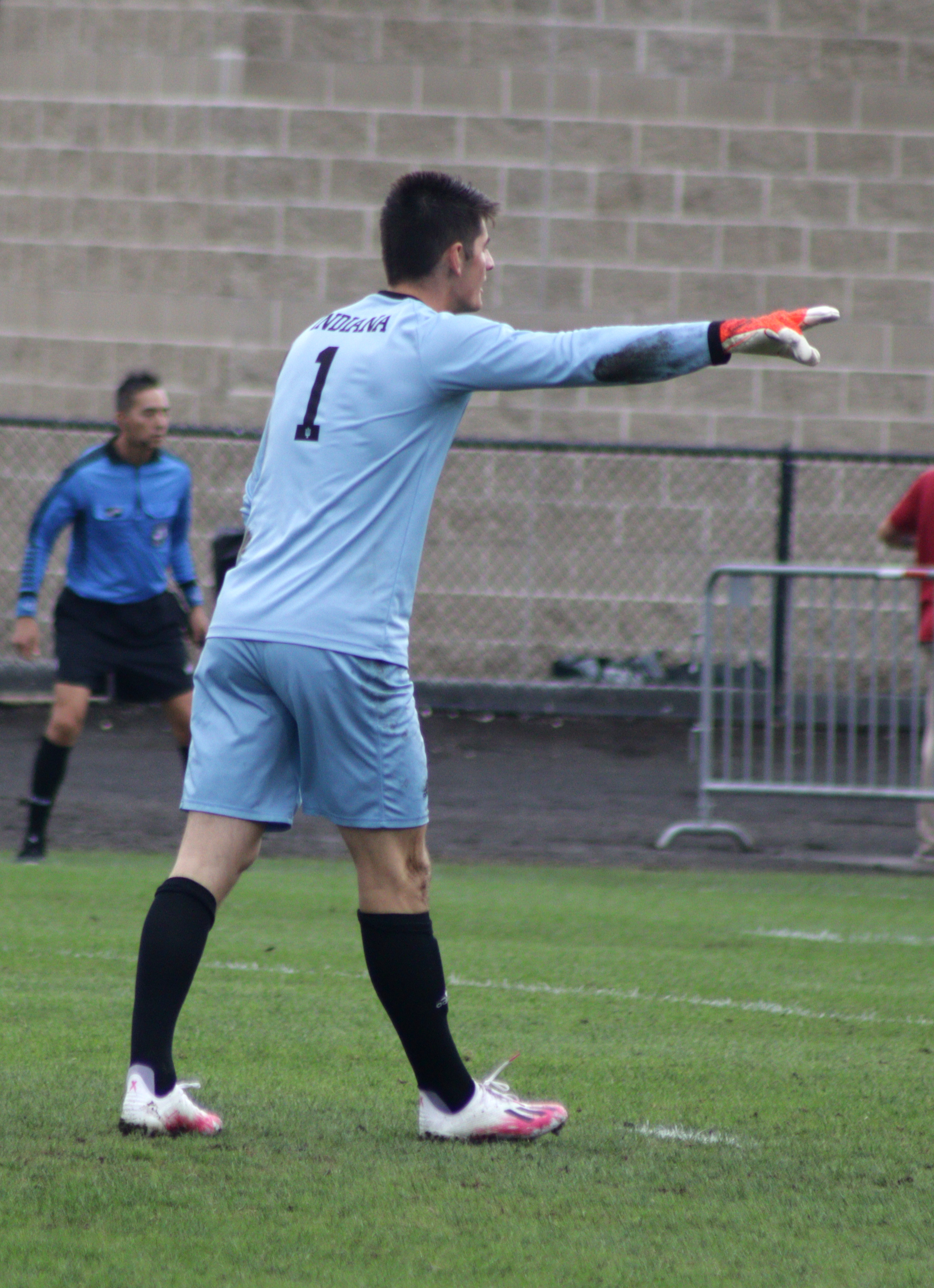
Celentano playing for Indiana University in 2021

=== Youth and college ===
Celentano enrolled at Indiana University in 2019 and joined the Indiana Hoosiers men's soccer team. He played for the Hoosiers for three seasons, the first two of which they were Big Ten Conference regular season champions and tournament champions. Celentano was twice named Big Ten Goalkeeper of the Year, was twice named to the Big Ten All-Tournament Team, and was recognized as the Big Ten Defensive Player of the Tournament in 2020.

=== Professional ===
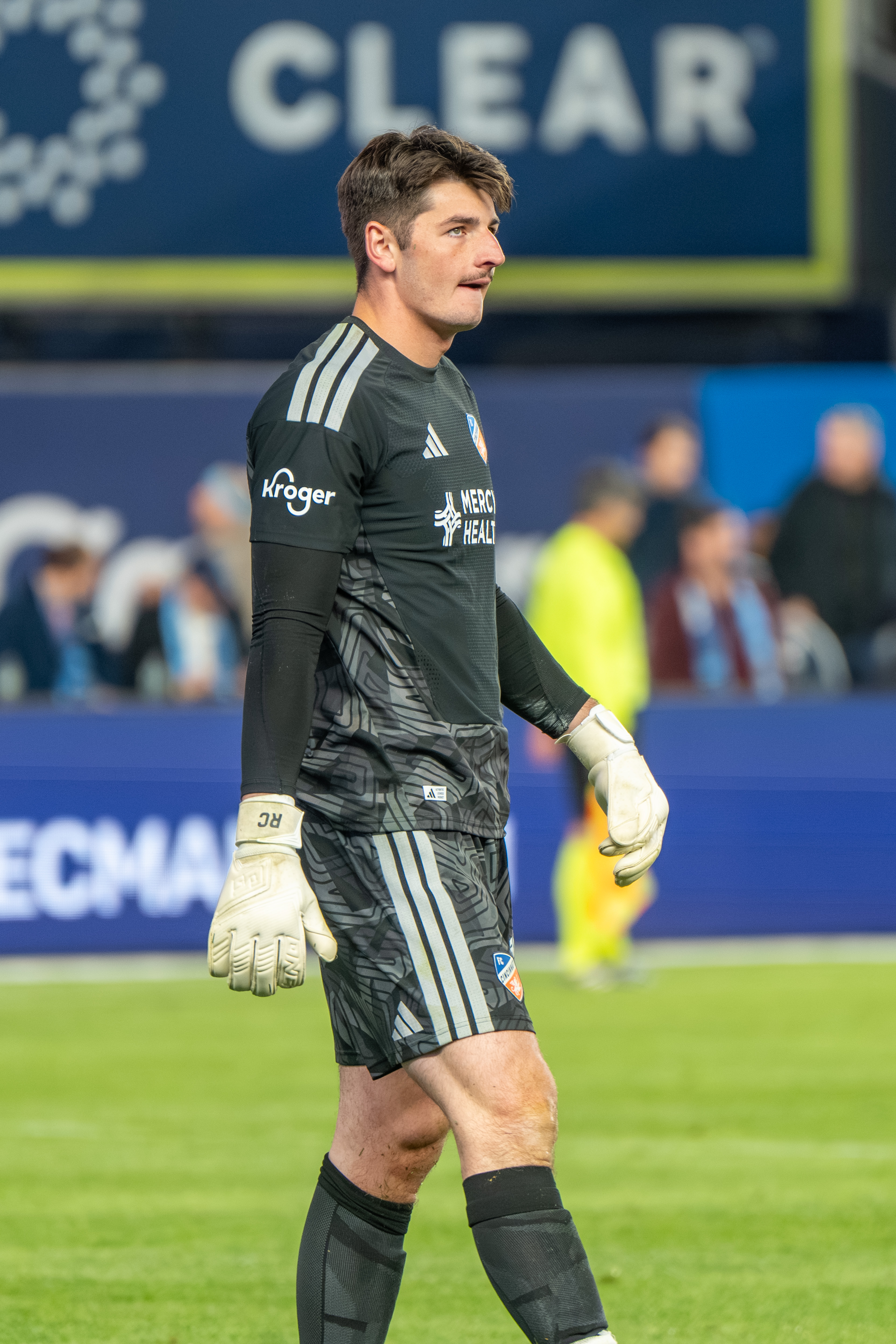
Celentano with FC Cincinnati in 2026

Celentano decided to forgo his senior year of college at Indiana University to sign a Generation Adidas contract with Major League Soccer, making him eligible for the 2022 MLS SuperDraft. Projected as a Top 10 draft pick, Celentano was drafted second overall by FC Cincinnati in the draft, becoming the highest drafted goalkeeper in the SuperDraft since Andre Blake in 2014. As a Generation adidas player, he signed with FC Cincinnati the same day on January 11, 2022.

Celentano went on loan for the early part of the 2022 season with Cincinnati's reserve team, FC Cincinnati 2 in MLS Next Pro, where he made his professional debut on March 27, 2022, in a 2–0 loss to Philadelphia Union II. Celentano made his first team debut for Cincinnati on April 19, 2022, in a U.S. Open Cup match against the Pittsburgh Riverhounds. A few days later, on April 24, 2022, Celentano made his MLS debut, starting and playing the full match in a 2–1 loss to Los Angeles FC.

Celentano bagged his first clean sheet in a victory against Toronto FC on May 4, 2022, and then followed that up with a second consecutive clean sheet against Minnesota United FC. That earned the rookie a spot in the MLS team of the week for Week 10 of the 2022 Major League Soccer season.

On May 20, 2023, Celentano punched away a close-range header by Steven Moreira late in a match against Columbus Crew. Cincinnati maintained their 3–2 win, and Celentano's save was later named the 2023 MLS Save of the Year.

On October 28, 2025, Celentano won the 2025 edition of the MLS Save of the Year. Celentano was awarded the honor for stopping multiple close-range attempts by Nashville SC's Alex Muyl and Sam Surridge in a 2–1 win on March 29. Celentano also became the fourth goalkeeper to win the award on multiple occasions.

== International career ==
In January 2023, Celentano received his first call-up to the United States ahead of friendlies against Serbia and Colombia.

== Career statistics ==
=== Club ===
As of match played November 7, 2026

Appearances and goals by club, season and competition
Club	Season	League			Playoffs		National cup (Note: Includes U.S. Open Cup)		League cup (Note: Includes Leagues Cup)		Continental		Total	
Club	Season	Division	Apps	Goals	Apps	Goals	Apps	Goals	Apps	Goals	Apps	Goals	Apps	Goals
FC Cincinnati	2022	MLS	27	0	2	0	1	0	—		—		30	0
FC Cincinnati	2023	MLS	33	0	4	0	—		—		—		37	0
FC Cincinnati	2024	MLS	30	0	3	0	—		3	0	4 (Note: Appearances in CONCACAF Champions Cup)	0	40	0
FC Cincinnati	2025	MLS	30	0	4	0	—		1	0	3	0	38	0
FC Cincinnati	2026	MLS	29	0	—		—		—		3	0	32	0
FC Cincinnati	Total		149	0	13	0	1	0	4	0	10	0	177	0
FC Cincinnati 2 (loan)	2022	MLS Next Pro	2	0	—		—		—		—		2	0
Career total			151	0	13	0	1	0	4	0	10	0	179	0

== Honors ==
FC Cincinnati

- Supporters' Shield: 2023

Individual

- Big Ten Conference Goalkeeper of the Year: 2020, 2021
- NCAA Men's Division I Tournament Defensive MOP Award: 2020
- MLS Save of the Year: 2023, 2025
