= 2020 Big Ten Conference men's soccer season =

- League: NCAA Division I
- Sport: Soccer
- Duration: February 3, 2021 – April 17, 2021
- Teams: 9

2021 MLS SuperDraft
- Top draft pick: Josh Penn, 10th overall
- Picked by: Inter Miami

Regular Season

Tournament

Big Ten Conference men's soccer seasons
- ← 2019 2021 →

2020 Big Ten Conference men's soccer standings
	Conf.					Overall
Team	W		L		T	W		L		T
No. 2 Indiana ‡	7	–	1	–	0	12	–	2	–	2
No. 11 Penn State +	6	–	1	–	1	10	–	2	–	2
Michigan	5	–	3	–	1	6	–	4	–	1
Maryland +	4	–	3	–	1	4	–	5	–	2
Rutgers	4	–	4	–	0	4	–	4	–	1
Michigan State	4	–	6	–	0	4	–	7	–	0
Ohio State	3	–	5	–	1	3	–	6	–	1
Northwestern	2	–	7	–	1	2	–	8	–	1
Wisconsin	2	–	7	–	1	2	–	7	–	1
‡ – 2020 B1G Tournament champion + – Also invited to the 2020 NCAA Tournament; As of May 28, 2021; Rankings from United Soccer Coaches; Source: Big Ten

The 2020 Big Ten Conference men's soccer season is the 30th season of men's varsity soccer in the conference. The season was originally scheduled to begin on August 28 and conclude on November 8, 2020. Due to the COVID-19 pandemic, the season was postponed to start February 3, 2021 and conclude on April 17, 2021.

The season will culminate with the 2020 Big Ten Conference Men's Soccer Tournament to determine the conference's automatic berth into the 2020 NCAA Division I Men's Soccer Tournament.

Indiana enters the season as the two-time defending regular season and tournament champion.

== Background ==
=== Previous season ===
The previous season was the 29th season of men's varsity soccer in the conference. The 2019 Big Ten regular season began on August 30, 2019 concluded on November 3, 2019. The season culminated with the 2019 Big Ten Conference Men's Soccer Tournament to determine the conference's automatic berth into the 2019 NCAA Division I Men's Soccer Tournament. Indiana went on to win both the regular season and the tournament, winning seven of their eight of their Big Ten Conference games. They defeated Penn State in the Big Ten Men's Soccer Championship Game.

With the Big Ten title, Indiana earned the conference's automatic berth into the 2019 NCAA Tournament, where Maryland, Michigan, and Penn State joined as at-large berths. Maryland and Penn State were eliminated in the Second Round, while Michigan and Indiana were eliminated in the Third Round.

In the 2020 MLS SuperDraft, Jack Maher was selected second-overall in the draft, being selected by expansion team, Nashville SC. Nine total Big Ten players were selected in the draft; tied for the second most of all conferences.

=== Impact of the COVID-19 pandemic ===
Like most Big Ten sports, men's soccer played a conference-only schedule for the 2020–21 academic year. Additionally, like many fall sports, the season was postponed to the spring.

== Head coaches ==
As of the 2019 season

Team	Head coach	Previous job	Years at school	Overall record	Record at school	Big Ten record	NCAA Tournaments	NCAA College Cups	NCAA Titles
Indiana	Todd Yeagley	Wisconsin	9	129–54–36 (.671)	122–45–34 (.692)	35–15–18 (.647)	10	3	1
Maryland	Sasho Cirovski	Hartford	26	412–156–60 (.704)	386–143–53 (.709)	24–9–7 (.688)	25	9	3
Michigan	Chaka Daley	Providence	7	151–165–48 (.481)	61–54–21 (.526)	23–20–9 (.529)	3	0	0
Michigan State	Damon Rensing	Michigan State (asst.)	10	117–66–30 (.620)	117–66–30 (.620)	31–26–13 (.536)	8	1	0
Northwestern	Tim Lenahan	Lafayette	18	305–209–72 (.582)	169–140–51 (.540)	36–60–20 (.397)	9	0	0
Ohio State	Brian Maisonneuve	Indiana (asst.)	2	1–15–2 (.111)	1–15–2 (.111)	0–7–1 (.063)	0	0	0
Penn State	Jeff Cook	Bethlehem Steel (asst.)	2	127–104–36 (.543)	6–9–2 (.412)	3–3–2 (.500)	9	0	0
Rutgers	Jim McElderry	Fordham	1	127–125–37 (.503)	0–0–0 (–)	0–0–0 (–)	3	0	0
Wisconsin	John Trask	UIC	10	129–96–55 (.559)	75–72–29 (.509)	26–28–10 (.484)	2	0	0

== Preseason ==
=== Preseason poll ===
The preseason poll was released on February 18, 2021. Indiana was selected unanimously as the favorite to win the Big Ten.

	Team ranking
1.	Indiana
2.	Maryland
3.	Penn State
4.	Michigan
5.	Michigan State
6.	Northwestern
7.	Rutgers
8.	Wisconsin
9.	Ohio State

=== Preseason national polls ===
The preseason national polls were released in January and February 2021 due to the COVID-19 pandemic.

	United; Soccer	CSN	Top Drawer; Soccer
Indiana	—	6	7
Maryland	—	12	21
Michigan	—	13	RV
Michigan State	—	—	—
Northwestern	—	—	—
Ohio State	—	—	—
Penn State	—	21	23
Rutgers	—	—	—
Wisconsin	—	—	—

== Regular season ==
B1G member won	B1G member lost	B1G member tied
All times in Central Time

=== Conference results ===
Each team plays every four other conference team twice; once home and once away, and then four other conference teams once.

Home \ Away	IU	UMD	MICH	MSU	NW	OSU	PSU	RUT	WIS
Indiana	—	PPD.	—	2–1	3–0	3–0	PPD.	—	3–0
Maryland	—	—	—	Mar. 19	—	Feb. 27	Mar. 31	Mar. 23	Mar. 7
Michigan	Mar. 27	Mar. 11	—	1–0	—	Mar. 31	Mar. 3	—	—
Michigan State	—	—	Mar. 23	—	Mar. 11	Mar. 3	—	0–2	Mar. 31
Northwestern	Feb. 27	Mar. 27	1–4	—	—	—	Mar. 19	—	Mar. 15
Ohio State	—	—	Mar. 15	Apr. 4	Mar. 7	—	Mar. 23	Mar. 27	—
Penn State	—	3–2	—	Feb. 27	—	—	—	Mar. 15	Mar. 27
Rutgers	Mar. 19	Mar. 3	Mar. 7	—	Apr. 4	—	1–2	—	—
Wisconsin	Mar. 11	—	Apr. 4	—	2–5	Mar. 19	—	Feb. 27	—

Source: Big Ten Conference
Legend: Blue = home team win; Yellow = draw; Red = away team win.
For upcoming matches, an "a" indicates there is an article about the rivalry between the two participants.

=== Positions by round ===
Team ╲ Round	1	2	3	4	5	6	7	8	9	10
Indiana	2	1								
Michigan	1	2								
Penn State	4	3								
Rutgers	3									
Maryland	5									
Michigan State	6									
Ohio State	7									
Wisconsin	8									
Northwestern	9									

Quarterfinal host
Quarterfinal
Play-in round

Source: BigTen.com

== Postseason ==
=== Big Ten Tournament ===
The Big Ten Tournament was played from April 10–17.

Quarterfinals; April 10
1	Indiana	3
8	Northwestern	0
4	Maryland (p)	1 (5)
5	Rutgers	1 (4)
3	Michigan	1
6	Michigan State	0
2	Penn State	3
7	Ohio State	1

Semifinals; April 14
1	Indiana	2
4	Maryland	0
3	Michigan	1
2	Penn State	4

Championship; April 17
1	Indiana (p)	1 (3)
2	Penn State	1 (2)

=== NCAA Tournament ===
The NCAA Tournament began in April 2021 and concluded on May 17, 2021.

Seed	School	2nd Round	3rd Round	Quarterfinals	Semifinals	Championship
3	Indiana	T 1–1 (W 3–1 p) vs. St. Francis Brooklyn	W 2–1 vs. Marquette	W 2–0 vs. (6) Seton Hall	W 1–0 vs. (2) Pittsburgh	L 0–1 (OT) vs. Marshall
—N/a	Penn State	W 4–1 vs. UMass	L 2–3 vs. (8) Georgetown	—	—	—
—N/a	Maryland	L 1–2 vs. Missouri State	—	—	—	—
W–L–T (%):		1–1–1 (.500)	1–1–0 (.500)	1–0–0 (1.000)	1–0–0 (1.000)	0–1–0 (.000) Total: 4–3–1 (.563)

== MLS SuperDraft ==
=== Total picks by school ===
Team	Round 1	Round 2	Round 3	Total
Indiana	1	–	–	1
Maryland	1	1	–	2
Michigan	–	2	–	2
Michigan State	–	–	1	1
Northwestern	–	–	–	0
Ohio State	–	2	1	3
Penn State	1	–	–	1
Rutgers	–	–	–	0
Wisconsin	–	–	1	1
Total	3	5	3	11

=== List of selections ===
Round	Pick #	MLS team	Player	Position	College
1	10	Inter Miami CF	(United States) Joshua Penn	FW	Indiana
1	22	Orlando City SC	(United States) Brandon Hackenburg	DF	Penn State
1	25	Toronto FC	(United States) Matt Di Rosa	MF	Maryland
2	33	Chicago Fire FC	(United States) Jackson Ragen	DF	Michigan
2	41	Los Angeles FC	(United States) CC Uche	DF	Ohio State
2	44	New York City FC	(United States) Ben Di Rosa	DF	Maryland
2	52	Columbus Crew	(United States) Joshua Jackson-Ketchup	DF	Ohio State
2	53	Vancouver Whitecaps FC	(Canada) Joel Harrison	DF	Michigan
3	55	Austin FC	(United States) Noah Lawrence	GK	Ohio State
3	60	Chicago Fire FC	(United States) Mitch Guitar	MF	Wisconsin
3	63	CF Montréal	(United States) Giuseppe Barone	MF	Michigan State
