= 2020 NCAA Division I men's soccer tournament =

- Classification: Division I
- Teams: 36
- Site: WakeMed Soccer Park (Semifinal and Final); Cary, North Carolina
- Champions: Marshall (1st title)
- Winning coach: Chris Grassie (1st title)
- MVP: Offense: Jamil Roberts (Marshall); Defense: Roman Celentano (Indiana)
- Broadcast: ESPNU, ESPN2

The 2020 NCAA Division I men's soccer tournament was the 62nd edition of the NCAA Division I men's soccer tournament, a postseason tournament to determine the national champion of NCAA Division I men's college soccer. Pending developments with the COVID-19 pandemic, the first four rounds of the competition were scheduled to be held at the home ground of the higher seed, while the College Cup (semifinals and final) was to be held at Harder Stadium in Santa Barbara, California. The championship match was originally scheduled to take place on December 13, 2020.

On August 13, 2020, the tournament was postponed due to the ongoing COVID-19 pandemic, although the possibility of playing the tournament during the spring 2021 remained.

On September 10, 2020, it was reported that the 2020 NCAA Division I Men's Soccer Tournament would tentatively be rescheduled from April 30 to May 17, 2021. This was approved on September 16, 2020, with a reduced tournament field size of 36 teams. The College Cup was moved from Santa Barbara, California to Cary, North Carolina. Additionally, on March 25, 2021, the NCAA announced that the entire tournament, as well as the entire women's tournament, would be held in various locations throughout North Carolina.

Marshall won the title game 1–0 in overtime over Indiana. This was not only Marshall's first men's soccer title, but was also the first national title in a team sport won by a Conference USA member while affiliated with the league.

== Qualification ==
Due to the ongoing COVID-19 pandemic, the 2020 edition of the NCAA Division I Men's Soccer Tournament featured only 36 teams. Of the 36 berths, 22 were allocated to the 19 conference tournament champions and to the regular-season winners of the Mid-American Conference, Pac-12 Conference, and West Coast Conference, which do not have tournaments. This included the champions of the ACC and Sun Belt, which held their conference championships in fall 2020. The additional 14 berths were at-large berths largely determined upon the Rating Percentage Index (RPI) of teams that did not automatically qualify.

Ahead of the season, the Ivy League and Big West Conference canceled their seasons, allowing for two additional at-large berths.

=== Qualified teams ===
Team	Qualified as	Qualified on	Qualification type	Previous appearances in tournament	Previous best performance
Coastal Carolina	Sun Belt champions	November 15, 2020	Automatic	16 (1992, 1995, 2001, 2002, 2003, 2004, 2005, 2010, 2011, 2012, 2013, 2014, 2015, 2016, 2017, 2019)	Third round (2003, 2012, 2013, 2017)
Clemson	ACC champions	April 17, 2021	Automatic	32 (1972, 1973, 1974, 1975, 1976, 1977, 1978, 1979, 1981, 1982, 1983, 1984, 1985, 1987, 1990, 1991, 1993, 1995, 1997, 1998, 2000, 2001, 2002, 2003, 2005, 2006, 2013, 2014, 2015, 2016, 2017, 2019)	Winners (1984, 1987)
New Hampshire	Am. East champions	April 17, 2021	Automatic	4 (1994, 2017, 2018, 2019)	Round of 16 (2017)
UCF	American champions	April 17, 2021	Automatic	9 (1982, 1983, 2002, 2003, 2004, 2010, 2011, 2018, 2019)	Round of 16 (2019)
Jacksonville	ASUN champions	~~April 17, 2021~~; April 18, 2021	Automatic	5 (1987, 1995, 1996, 1998, 2008)	Round of 16 (1998)
Fordham	Atlantic 10 champions	April 17, 2021	Automatic	4 (1996, 2014, 2016, 2017)	Quarterfinals (2017)
Seton Hall	Big East champions	April 17, 2021	Automatic	11 (1986, 1987, 1988, 1990, 1991, 1992, 2001, 2002, 2003, 2004, 2005)	Quarterfinals (1988)
High Point	Big South champions	April 17, 2021	Automatic	1 (2018)	First round (2018)
Indiana	Big Ten champions	April 17, 2021	Automatic	44 (1974, 1976, 1977, 1978, 1979, 1980, 1981, 1982, 1983, 1984, 1985, 1987, 1988, 1989, 1990, 1991, 1992, 1993, 1994, 1995, 1996, 1997, 1998, 1999, 2000, 2001, 2002, 2003, 2004, 2005, 2006, 2007, 2008, 2009, 2010, 2011, 2012, 2013, 2014, 2015, 2016, 2017, 2018, 2019)	Winners (1982, 1983, 1988, 1998, 1999, 2003, 2004, 2012)
James Madison	CAA champions	April 17, 2021	Automatic	16 (1971, 1972, 1973, 1976, 1992, 1993, 1994, 1995, 1996, 2000, 2001, 2005, 2011, 2014, 2018, 2019)	Quarterfinals (1994, 1995, 2018)
Marshall	C-USA champions	April 18, 2021	Automatic	1 (2019)	Round of 16 (2019)
Milwaukee	Horizon champions	April 17, 2021	Automatic	8 (1979, 1990, 2001, 2002, 2003, 2004, 2005, 2013)	Second round (2002, 2003, 2004, 2005)
Monmouth	MAAC champions	April 17, 2021	Automatic	6 (1990, 2006, 2009, 2010, 2011, 2014)	Second round (2009, 2011)
Bowling Green	MAC champions	April 17, 2021	Automatic	7 (1972, 1973, 1991, 1992, 1995, 1996, 1997)	Round of 16 (1972, 1973, 1995)
Missouri State	MVC champions	April 17, 2021	Automatic	4 (1997, 1999, 2009, 2019)	Second round (2019)
St. Francis Brooklyn	NEC champions	April 17, 2021	Automatic	9 (1974, 1976, 1977, 1978, 1982, 2013, 2014, 2016, 2017)	Quarterfinals (1978)
Stanford	Pac-12 champions	April 17, 2021	Automatic	18 (1962, 1978, 1991, 1992, 1997, 1998, 1999, 2000, 2001, 2002, 2009, 2013, 2014, 2015, 2016, 2017, 2018, 2019)	Winners (2015, 2016, 2017)
American	Patriot champions	April 17, 2021	Automatic	8 (1978, 1979, 1984, 1985, 1997, 2001, 2002, 2004)	Runners-Up (1985)
UNCG	SoCon champions	April 17, 2021	Automatic	11 (1992, 1993, 1994, 1995, 1996, 1998, 2004, 2005, 2006, 2008, 2010)	Round of 16 (2004, 2005, 2006, 2008)
~~Denver~~ Omaha	Summit champions	~~April 17, 2021~~ April 20, 2021	~~Automatic~~ Replacement	~~9 (1970, 2008, 2010, 2013, 2014, 2015, 2016, 2018, 2019)~~ 1 (2017)	~~Semifinals (2016)~~ First round (2017)
Air Force	WAC champions	April 17, 2021	Automatic	13 (1964, 1965, 1968, 1969, 1972, 1977, 1985, 1992, 1993, 1997, 2012, 2017, 2018)	Quarterfinals (1968, 1993)
Loyola Marymount	West Coast champions	April 17, 2021	Automatic	7 (2001, 2002, 2003, 2004, 2009, 2013, 2019)	Second round (2002, 2004)
Charlotte	No. 29 RPI	April 19, 2021	At-large	14 (1991, 1992, 1994, 1996, 1997, 2009, 2011, 2012, 2013, 2014, 2015, 2016, 2019)	Runners-Up (2011)
Georgetown	No. 2 RPI	April 19, 2021	At-large	10 (1994, 1997, 2010, 2012, 2013, 2014, 2015, 2017, 2018, 2019)	Winners (2019)
Grand Canyon	No. 6 RPI	April 19, 2021	At-large	1 (2018)	First round (2018)
Kentucky	No. 63 RPI	April 19, 2021	At-large	10 (1999, 2000, 2001, 2003, 2012, 2014, 2015, 2016, 2018, 2019)	Quarterfinals (2018)
Marquette	No. 8 RPI	April 19, 2021	At-large	3 (1997, 2012, 2013)	Round of 16 (2013)
Maryland	No. 75 RPI	April 19, 2021	At-large	39 (1959, 1960, 1961, 1962, 1963, 1964, 1967, 1968, 1969, 1970, 1971, 1973, 1976, 1986, 1994, 1995, 1996, 1997, 1998, 1999, 2001, 2002, 2003, 2004, 2005, 2006, 2007, 2008, 2009, 2010, 2011, 2012, 2013, 2014, 2015, 2016, 2017, 2018, 2019)	Winners (1968, 2005, 2008, 2018)
North Carolina	No. 38 RPI	April 19, 2021	At-large	26 (1968, 1987, 1988, 1990, 1991, 1993, 1994, 1999, 2000, 2001, 2002, 2003, 2004, 2005, 2006, 2008, 2009, 2010, 2011, 2012, 2013, 2014, 2015, 2016, 2017, 2018)	Winners (2001, 2011)
Oregon State	No. 42 RPI	April 19, 2021	At-large	4 (2002, 2003, 2014, 2018)	Second round (2014)
Penn State	No. 19 RPI	April 19, 2021	At-large	33 (1970, 1971, 1972, 1973, 1974, 1975, 1976, 1977, 1978, 1979, 1980, 1981, 1982, 1984, 1985, 1986, 1988, 1989, 1992, 1993, 1994, 1995, 1998, 1999, 2001, 2002, 2004, 2005, 2009, 2010, 2013, 2014, 2019)	Semifinals (1979)
Pitt	No. 9 RPI	April 19, 2021	At-large	3 (1962, 1965, 2019)	Quarterfinals (1962)
UMass	No. 15 RPI	April 19, 2021	At-large	4 (2001, 2007, 2008, 2017)	Semifinals (2007)
Virginia Tech	No. 56 RPI	April 19, 2021	At-large	8 (2003, 2005, 2006, 2007, 2016, 2017, 2018, 2019)	Semifinals (2007)
Wake Forest	No. 18 RPI	April 19, 2021	At-large	23 (1988, 1989, 1990, 1991, 1999, 2001, 2002, 2003, 2004, 2005, 2006, 2007, 2008, 2009, 2011, 2012, 2013, 2014, 2015, 2016, 2017, 2018, 2019)	Winners (2007)
Washington	No. 26 RPI	April 19, 2021	At-large	26 (1968, 1972, 1973, 1976, 1978, 1982, 1989, 1992, 1995, 1996, 1997, 1998, 1999, 2000, 2001, 2003, 2004, 2006, 2007, 2012, 2013, 2014, 2016, 2017, 2018, 2019)	Quarterfinals (2003, 2019)

== Venues ==
Rather than the higher seed hosting the early-round matches, the entire tournament was played in the state of North Carolina, similar to how the 2021 men's and women's basketball tournaments were held in a single state.

Cary	Greenville	Wilmington	Wilson
WakeMed Soccer Park	Johnson Stadium	UNCW Soccer Stadium	Gillette Soccer Park
Capacity: 10,000	Capacity: 1,000	Capacity: 3,000	Capacity: N/A'
Greensboro	Winston-Salem	Matthews	Browns Summit
UNCG Soccer Stadium	Spry Stadium	Mathews Sportsplex	Macpherson Stadium
Capacity: 3,540	Capacity: 3,000	Capacity: 2,300	Capacity: 3,000
Wilson			
J. Burt Gillette Athletic Complex			
Capacity:			

== Schedule ==
The revised schedule was announced on March 24, 2021.

Round	Original Dates	Revised Dates
First round	November 18, 2020	April 29, 2021
Second round	November 21, 2020	May 2, 2021
Third round	November 28–30, 2020	May 6, 2021
Quarterfinals	December 4–6, 2020	May 10, 2021
College Cup Semifinals	December 11, 2020	May 14, 2021
College Cup Final	December 13, 2020	May 17, 2021

== Bracket ==
=== Opening Round ===
First round
Jacksonville	1 (4)
American	1 (5)

First round
~~Denver~~ Omaha	3
UNC Greensboro	2

First round
Milwaukee	1
St. Francis Brooklyn	2

First round
Bowling Green	1
Monmouth	2

=== Bracket ===
Second round
1	Clemson	2
American	1
Fordham	1
Marshall	2 (OT)
Penn State	4
UMass	1
High Point	0
8	Georgetown	2
5	Wake Forest	3
Coastal Carolina	2
Kentucky	2
New Hampshire	0
North Carolina	1 (4)
Charlotte	1 (1)
Omaha	0
4	Stanford	1 (OT)
3	Indiana	1 (3)
St. Francis Brooklyn	1 (1)
Marquette	0 (3)
Loyola Marymount	0 (1)
Oregon State	1
Virginia Tech	2 (OT)
Air Force	1
6	Seton Hall	2
7	Washington	2
Grand Canyon	0
Maryland	1
Missouri State	2
UCF	2
James Madison	1
Monmouth	1
2	Pittsburgh	6

Third round
1	Clemson	1 (6)
Marshall	1 (7)
Penn State	2
8	Georgetown	3
5	Wake Forest	2
Kentucky	1
North Carolina	1
4	Stanford	0
3	Indiana	2
Marquette	1
Virginia Tech	2 (6)
6	Seton Hall	2 (7)
7	Washington	2
Missouri State	0
UCF	0
2	Pittsburgh	4

Quarterfinals
Marshall	1
8	Georgetown	0
5	Wake Forest	1
North Carolina	2
3	Indiana	2
6	Seton Hall	0
7	Washington	0
2	Pittsburgh	3

College Cup Semis
Marshall	1
North Carolina	0
3	Indiana	1
2	Pittsburgh	0

College Cup Final
Marshall	1 (OT)
3	Indiana	0

== Results ==
=== First round ===
April 29, 2021	Jacksonville	3–3 (a.e.t.) (4–5 p)	American	Winston-Salem, North Carolina
6:00 p.m. EDT	Reggie Nicolas (yellow card) 28', (goal) 81'; Oliver Correa 58'; Cao Chaves (yellow card) 60'; Jake Duncan-Smith (yellow card) 78'; Nil Ringstrand (yellow card) 80'; Joshua Moreira 84'	Report	22' David Coly; 51' Nicolas Blassou; (yellow card) 51' Damian Searchwell; 60' Jack Green	Stadium: Spry Stadium; Attendance: 106; Referee: Brandon Gardner; Assistant referees: Kyle Johnson; Kevin Maurer; Fourth official: Jennifer Dumaine
	Penalties
	Jake Duncan-Smith (penalty scored); Jake Johnson (penalty scored); Reed Davis (penalty scored); Cao Chaves (penalty missed); Reggie Nicolas (penalty scored)		(penalty scored) David Coly; (penalty scored) Viggo Sjoberg; (penalty scored) Robert Matei; (penalty scored) Jack Green; (penalty scored) Oscar McConnell

April 29, 2021	Omaha	3–2	UNCG	Greensboro, North Carolina
6:00 p.m. EDT	Nil Ayats 31'; Gonzalo Ledesma (yellow card) 65'; Hugo Kametani 68', 86'; Jeremy Pollard (yellow card) 71'; Tevin Rochester (yellow card) 82'	Report	71' Theo Collomb; 76' Mani Austmann	Stadium: UNCG Soccer Stadium; Attendance: 732; Referee: Ryan Nee; Assistant referees: Stephen Foster; Richard Crowgey; Fourth official: Nicole Green

April 29, 2021	Milwaukee	1–2 (a.e.t.)	St. Francis Brooklyn	Wilmington, North Carolina
6:00 p.m. EDT	Raul Medina 61' (pen.)	Report	(yellow card) 44' Ridwan Hannan; (yellow card) 49' Harald Sollund; (yellow card) 88' Mamadou Diallo; 88' El Mahdi Youssoufi; 104' Ivan Tapuskovic	Stadium: UNCW Soccer Stadium; Attendance: 138; Referee: Elvis Osmanovic; Assistant referees: Amin Hadzic; Alla Stephanov; Fourth official: Carmen Serbio

April 29, 2021	Bowling Green	1–2	Monmouth	Greensboro, North Carolina
6:00 p.m. EDT	Nathan Masters 42'; Garrido Fernandez (yellow card) 68'; Jensen Lukacsko (yellow card) 69'	Report	(yellow card) 4' Robin Oswald; (yellow card) 33' Luke McBeth; 56' Julian Gomez; (yellow card) 65' Ben Zakowski; (yellow card) 79' Nick Rogers; 81' Jonas Linder	Stadium: Macpherson Stadium; Attendance: 300; Referee: Regio Gonzalez

=== Second round ===
May 2, 2021	^{(8)} Georgetown	2–0	High Point	Matthews, North Carolina
12:00 p.m. EDT	Zach Riviere 20'; Chris Hegardt 48'; Will Sands (yellow card) 76'	Report		Stadium: Matthews Sportsplex; Attendance: 253; Referee: Travis Haight; Assistant referees: Carlos Pielago; Donovan Eubank; Fourth official: Megan McCain

May 2, 2021	Kentucky	2–0	New Hampshire	Browns Summit, North Carolina
12:00 p.m. EDT	Bailey Rouse 34'; Daniel Evans (yellow card) 54'; Jalen Bigby 84'	Report	(red card) 13' Oneil Smith-Elias; (yellow card) 30' Bridger Hansen; (yellow card) 39' Team; (yellow card) 45' Chris Pinkham	Stadium: Macpherson Stadium; Attendance: 300; Referee: David Erbacher; Assistant referees: Rick Rogers; Larry Pachon; Fourth official: Magda Zwierzchowski

May 2, 2021	Fordham	1–2 (a.e.t.)	Marshall	Wilson, North Carolina
1:00 p.m. EDT	Galen Flynn (yellow card) 29'; Max Rogers 42'; Team (red card) 45'	Report	24', 96' Milo Yosef; (yellow card) 28' Gabriel Alvex; (yellow card) 82' Team	Stadium: J. Burt Gillette Athletic Complex; Attendance: 208; Referee: Mark Gorak; Assistant referees: Mark Garcia; Aleksander Zhelayzko; Fourth official: Ashley Cedro

May 2, 2021	Penn State	4–1	UMass	Greensboro, North Carolina
1:00 p.m. EDT	UMass own goal 9' (o.g.); Alex Stevenson 20'; Keegan Ness (yellow card) 23'; Seth Kuhn 31'; Andrew Privett (yellow card) 64'; Tyger Evans 81'	Report	52' (o.g.) Penn State own goal; (yellow card) 74' Ryan Levay; (yellow card) 78' Ben Shepherd	Stadium: UNCG Soccer Stadium; Attendance: 167; Referee: Mark Kadlecik; Assistant referees: Khadime Sabara; Ryan Williams; Fourth official: Abbas Piran

May 2, 2021	Marquette	0–0 (a.e.t.) (3–1 p)	Loyola Marymount	Cary, North Carolina
1:00 p.m. EDT	Jonathan Robinson (yellow card) 11'; Manuel Cukaj (yellow card) 41'; Oliver Posarelli (yellow card) 60'; Zak Wegner (yellow card) 99'	Report	(yellow card) 60' Christian Wood; (yellow card) 72' Dylan Shockey; (yellow card) 89' Bastien Oberli; (yellow card) 99' Corbin Mercado	Stadium: WakeMed Soccer Park; Attendance: 85; Referee: Karl Kummer; Assistant referees: Robert Velbis; Clive Edwards; Fourth official: Katie McCormick
	Penalties
	Beto Soto (penalty scored); Lukas Sunesson (penalty scored); Alan Salmeron (penalty scored); Zyan Andrade (penalty missed)		(penalty missed) Noel Caliskan; (penalty missed) Bastien Oberli; (penalty scored) Dylan Shockey; (penalty missed) Ronaldo Brown

May 2, 2021	^{(5)} Wake Forest	3–2	Coastal Carolina	Winston-Salem, North Carolina
1:00 p.m. EDT	Omar Hernandez 6', 48'; Coastal Carolina own goal 22' (o.g.); David Wrona (yellow card) 28'; Takuma Suzuki (yellow card) 86'	Report	46' Kasper Skraep; 81' Claudio Repetto; (yellow card) 87' Connor Pugh	Stadium: Spry Stadium; Attendance: 509; Referee: Mike Stutt; Assistant referees: Chris Zuerner; Hudson Owens; Fourth official: Kevin Uitto

May 2, 2021	Maryland	1–2	Missouri State	Wilmington, North Carolina
1:00 p.m. EDT	Eric Matzelevich 83'	Report	85', 89' Jon Koka	Stadium: UNCW Soccer Stadium; Attendance: 250; Referee: Lucas Feathers; Assistant referees: Bill Dittmar; Aaron Gallagher; Fourth official: Howard Nash

May 2, 2021	Oregon State	1–2 (a.e.t.)	Virginia Tech	Browns Summit, North Carolina
4:00 p.m. EDT	Carols Moliner (yellow card) 9'; Team (yellow card) 10'; Sofiane Djeffal (yellow card) 65'; Tyrone Mondi 86'; Adrian Crespo (yellow card) 87'	Report	(yellow card) 8' Nick Blacklock; (yellow card) 31' Camron Joice; 53', 99' Jacob Labovitz	Stadium: Macpherson Stadium; Attendance: 300; Referee: Sergio Gonzalez; Assistant referees: Danny Marques; Izlen Peksenar; Fourth official: Brandon Ingraham

May 2, 2021	^{(7)} Washington	2–0	Grand Canyon	Matthews, North Carolina
4:00 p.m. EDT	Ryan Sailor 21'; Khai Brisco (yellow card) 23'; Christian Soto 55'	Report		Stadium: Matthews Sportsplex; Attendance: 54; Referee: Brandon Marion; Assistant referees: Zach McWhorter; Eric Usher; Fourth official: James McKean

May 2, 2021	^{(3)} Indiana	1–1 (a.e.t.) (3–1 p)	St. Francis Brooklyn	Wilmington, North Carolina
5:00 p.m. EDT	Joe Schmidt (yellow card) 26'; Victor Bezerra 35'; Nate Ward (yellow card) 92'	Report	(yellow card) 41' Sokol Ymeraj; 77' El Mahdi Youssoufi	Stadium: UNCW Soccer Stadium; Attendance: 250; Referee: Carmen Serbio; Assistant referees: Jude Carr; Hicham El Bariqi; Fourth official: Oladokun Faduyile
	Penalties
	Thomas Warr (penalty scored); Joe Schmidt (penalty missed); Victor Bezerra (penalty scored); Ryan Wittenbrink (penalty scored)		(penalty missed) Sokol Ymeraj; (penalty missed) Khaled Abdella; (penalty scored) El Mahdi Youssoufi; (penalty missed) Nicolas Molina

May 2, 2021	^{(1)} Clemson	2–1	American	Winston-Salem, North Carolina
5:00 p.m. EDT	Mohamed Seye 51', (yellow card) 88'; James Brighton 61' (pen.)	Report	3' David Coly; (yellow card) 84' Jerry Zouantcha	Stadium: Spry Stadium; Attendance: 182; Referee: Heber Estrada; Assistant referees: Raymond Thomas; Tarik Veledar; Fourth official: Tim Eller

May 2, 2021	North Carolina	1–1 (a.e.t.) (4–1 p)	Charlotte	Cary, North Carolina
5:00 p.m. EDT	Akeim Clarke 73', (yellow card) 103'; Joe Pickering (yellow card) 95'	Report	(yellow card) 44' Patrick Hogan; 84' Joe Brito	Stadium: WakeMed Soccer Park; Attendance: 175
	Penalties
	Santiago Herrera (penalty scored); Alex Rose (penalty scored); Milo Garvanian (penalty scored); Errnest Bawa (penalty scored)		(penalty scored) Sean Suber; (penalty missed) Axel Sigurdarson; (penalty missed) Matteo Busio

May 2, 2021	UCF	2–1	James Madison	Wilson, North Carolina
5:00 p.m. EDT	Gino Vivi 3'; Lucca Dourado 54'; Yoni Sorokin (yellow card) 79'; Andres Hernandez (yellow card) 81'; Caleb Franke (yellow card) 90'	Report	50' Josiah Blanton; (yellow card) 78' Dennis Mensah; (yellow card) 82' Tyler Clegg	Stadium: J. Burt Gillette Athletic Complex; Attendance: 228; Referee: Ray Moffatte Jr; Assistant referees: Dustin Thorne; David McPhun; Fourth official: Patrick Schmidt

May 2, 2021	^{(4)} Stanford	1–0 (a.e.t.)	Omaha	Greensboro, North Carolina
5:00 p.m. EDT	Charlie Wehan (yellow card) 71', 90'	Report	(yellow card) 19' Team; (yellow card) 48' Stephen Siy; (yellow card) 89' Tevin Rochester	Stadium: UNCG Soccer Stadium; Attendance: 111; Referee: Jeremy Scheer; Assistant referees: Jeremy Smith; Kyle Johnston; Fourth official: Andrew Charron

May 2, 2021	^{(6)} Seton Hall	2–1	Air Force	Matthews, North Carolina
8:00 p.m. EDT	JP Martin 63'; CJ Tibbling 88'	Report	(yellow card) 17' Daniel Giuliano; (yellow card) 56' Thaddaeus Dewing; 74', (yellow card) 89' Tristan Trager; (yellow card) 86' Reece Cooke	Stadium: Matthews Sportsplex; Attendance: 135; Referee: Mark Buda; Assistant referees: Ben Ellis; Pete Mandell; Fourth official: Laura Rodriguez

May 2, 2021	^{(2)} Pittsburgh	6–1	Monmouth	Browns Summit, North Carolina
8:00 p.m. EDT	Valentin Noël 24'; Bryce Washington 38'; Alexander Dexter 51'; Monmouth Own Goal 56' (o.g.); Rodrigo Almeida 70'; Arturo Ordoñez (yellow card) 75'; Sito Sena 87' (pen.)	Report	(yellow card) 31' George Akampeke; (yellow card) 58' Liam McGregor; 76', (red card) 86' Julian Gomez; (yellow card) 87' Declan McStravick	Stadium: Macpherson Stadium; Attendance: 300; Referee: John Brady; Assistant referees: Robert Dail; Justin Howard; Fourth official: Richard Crowgey

=== Third round ===
May 6, 2021	^{(8)} Georgetown	3–2	Penn State	Cary, North Carolina
Noon EDT	Dante Polvara 8' (pen.); Zach Riviere 29'; Martin Ngoh 44'	Report	12' (pen.) Peter Mangione; (yellow card) 53' (red card) 90' Kris Shakes; (yellow card) 54' Seth Kuhn; 58' Daniel Bloyou	Stadium: WakeMed Soccer Park; Attendance: 167; Referee: Tori Penso; Assistant referees: Cory Richardson; Dill Mitmare; Fourth official: Nick Balcer

May 6, 2021	^{(7)} Washington	2–0	Missouri State	Cary, North Carolina
Noon EDT	Lucas Meek 64'; Nick Scardina 78'	Report	(yellow card) 18' Jack Denton; (yellow card) 88' Josh Dolling	Stadium: WakeMed Soccer Park; Attendance: 150; Referee: Karl Kummer; Assistant referees: Rachel Smith; Hichem Bariqi; Fourth official: Ben Ellis

May 6, 2021	^{(1)} Clemson	1–1 (a.e.t.) (6–7 p)	Marshall	Cary, North Carolina
3:00 p.m. EDT	Oskar Ågren (yellow card) 16'; Ousmane Sylla (yellow card) 27'; Callum Johnson 31'; Justin Malou (yellow card) 102'	Report	14' Max Schneider; (yellow card) 30' Gabriel Alves; (yellow card) 36' Milo Yosef; (yellow card) 62' Vinicius Fernandes; (yellow card) 94' Davi Edwards; (yellow card) 110' Pedro Dolabella	Stadium: WakeMed Soccer Park; Attendance: 185
	Penalties
	James Brighton (penalty scored); Luis Felipe Fernandez-Salvador (penalty scored); Hamady Diop (penalty scored); Mohamed Seye (penalty missed); Oskar Ågren (penalty scored); John Martin (penalty scored); Callum Johnson (penalty scored); Quinn McNeill (penalty missed)		(penalty missed) Jan-Erik Leinhos; (penalty scored) Max Schneider; (penalty scored) Nathan Dos Santos; (penalty scored) Vinicius Fernandes; (penalty scored) Jamil Roberts; (penalty scored) Joao Souza; (penalty scored) Ryan Sirk; (penalty scored) Vitor Dias

May 6, 2021	^{(2)} Pittsburgh	4–0	UCF	Cary, North Carolina
3:00 p.m. EDT	Veljko Petkovic 1', 21'; Alexander Dexter 11'; Matt Bailey (yellow card) 48'; Valentin Noël 64'	Report	(yellow card) 27' Caleb Franke	Stadium: WakeMed Soccer Park; Attendance: 86; Referee: Sorin Stoica; Assistant referees: Megan McMullen; Jude Carr; Fourth official: Carmen Sergio

May 6, 2021	^{(3)} Indiana	2–1	Marquette	Cary, North Carolina
6:00 p.m. EDT	Quinten Helmer (yellow card) 36'; Nyk Sessock (yellow card) 50'; A.J. Palazzolo (yellow card) 58'; Joe Schmidt (yellow card) 60'; Maouloune Goumballe (yellow card) 64', (goal) 79'; Herbert Endeley 70'; Ryan Wittenbrink (yellow card) 87'	Report	43' AJ Franklin; (yellow card) 53' Alex Mirsberger; (yellow card) 58' Nick Guido; (yellow card) 61' Zak Wegner; (yellow card) 71' Beto Soto; (yellow card) 75' Alan Salmeron	Stadium: WakeMed Soccer Park; Attendance: 86; Referee: Sergio Gonzalez; Assistant referees: Rick Rodgers; Dustin Thorne; Fourth official: Clive Edwards

May 6, 2021	^{(4)} Stanford	0–1	North Carolina	Cary, North Carolina
6:00 p.m. EDT	Ryan Ludwick (yellow card) 75'	Report	13' Joe Pickering; (yellow card) 51' Milo Garvanian	Stadium: WakeMed Soccer Park; Attendance: 185

May 6, 2021	^{(6)} Seton Hall	2–2 (a.e.t.) (7–6 p)	Virginia Tech	Cary, North Carolina
9:00 p.m. EDT	Maurice Williams 44'; Andrea Borg 80', (yellow card) 103'	Report	13', 55' Nick Blacklock; (yellow card) 51' (red card) 81' Jacob Labovitz	Stadium: WakeMed Soccer Park; Attendance: 132; Referee: Lucas Feathers; Assistant referees: Kyle Johnston; Tiffini Turpin; Fourth official: Abbas Piran
	Penalties
	Johannes Pex (penalty scored); Camil Koreichi (penalty missed); CJ Tibbling (penalty scored); James Boote (penalty scored); JP Marin (penalty scored); Andrea Borg (penalty scored); Eden O'Leary (penalty scored); Andreas Nota (penalty scored)		(penalty scored) Sivert Haugli; (penalty scored) Nick Blacklock; (penalty missed) Landon Ameres; (penalty scored) Zane Bubb; (penalty scored) Camron Joice; (penalty scored) Camron Lennon; (penalty scored) Andrew Weber; (penalty missed) Chris Little

May 6, 2021	^{(5)} Wake Forest	2–1	Kentucky	Cary, North Carolina
9:00 p.m. EDT	Kyle Holcomb 19', 61'; David Wrona (yellow card) 81'	Report	65' Brock Lindow; (yellow card) 67' Enzo Mauriz; (yellow card) 85' Robert Screen; (yellow card) 87' Clay Holstad	Stadium: WakeMed Soccer Park; Attendance: 156; Referee: Elvis Osmanovic; Assistant referees: Raymond Thomas; Elvis Mahmutovic

=== Quarterfinals ===
May 10, 2021	Marshall	1–0	^{(8)} Georgetown	Cary, North Carolina
1:00 p.m. EDT	Collin Mocyunas (yellow card) 60'; Jamil Roberts 69'; Team (yellow card) 79'; Gabriel Alves (yellow card) 81'	Report		Stadium: WakeMed Soccer Park; Attendance: 186

May 10, 2021	^{(2)} Pittsburgh	3–0	^{(7)} Washington	Cary, North Carolina
1:00 p.m. EDT	Jasper Löffelsend (yellow card) 10'; Arturo Ordoñez (yellow card) 29'; Valentin Noël 51'; Luke Peperak (yellow card) 68'; Bertin Jacquesson 87'; Veljko Petkovic 88'	Report	(yellow card) 40' Ryan Crowley	Stadium: WakeMed Soccer Park; Attendance: 74; Referee: Matthew Thompson; Assistant referees: Meghan Mullen; Jarred Mosher; Fourth official: Christina Unkel

May 10, 2021	^{(5)} Wake Forest	1–2	North Carolina	Cary, North Carolina
5:00 p.m. EDT	Kyle Holcomb 9'; Garrison Tubbs (yellow card) 67'	Report	10' Giovanni Montesdeoca; (yellow card) 50' Cameron Fisher; (yellow card) 57' Tim Schels; 67' Santiago Herrera; (yellow card) 67' Alex Rose; (yellow card) 82' (red card) 85' Akeim Clarke; (yellow card) 88' Alec Smir	Stadium: WakeMed Soccer Park; Attendance: 189

May 10, 2021	^{(3)} Indiana	2–0	^{(6)} Seton Hall	Cary, North Carolina
5:00 p.m. EDT	Herbert Endeley (yellow card) 20'; Ryan Wittenbrink 43'; Nyk Sessock (yellow card) 44'; Thomas Warr 57', (yellow card) 74'	Report		Stadium: WakeMed Soccer Park; Attendance: 68; Referee: Carmen Serbio; Assistant referees: Jude Carr; Stephen Foster; Fourth official: Brandon Marion

=== College Cup Semifinals ===
May 14, 2021	Marshall	1–0	North Carolina	Cary, North Carolina
6:00 p.m. EDT	Jamil Roberts 60'; Jan-Erik Leinhos (yellow card) 77'; Joao Souza (yellow card) 79'	Report		Stadium: WakeMed Soccer Park; Referee: Nikola Aleksic; Assistant referees: Jeremy Smith; Justin Howard; Fourth official: Jude Carr

May 14, 2021	^{(2)} Pittsburgh	0–1	^{(3)} Indiana	Cary, North Carolina
8:30 p.m. EDT	Bryce Washington (yellow card) 61'	Report	Herbert Endeley 79'	Stadium: WakeMed Soccer Park; Attendance: 2,667; Referee: Daniel Radford; Assistant referees: Salma Perez; Ryan Starr; Fourth official: Alyssa Nichols

=== College Cup Final ===
May 17, 2021	Marshall	1–0	^{(3)} Indiana	Cary, North Carolina
9:15 p.m. EDT	Gabriel Alves (yellow card) 19'; Collin Mocyunas (yellow card) 48'; Jan-Erik Leinhos (yellow card) 66'; Nathan Dos Santos (yellow card) 88'; Jamil Roberts 98'	Report	(yellow card) 50' Joe Schmidt	Stadium: WakeMed Soccer Park; Attendance: 5,000; Referee: Sorin Stoica; Assistant referees: Eric Weisbrod; Ryan Graves; Fourth official: Brandon Marion

== Statistics ==
=== Goalscorers ===
3 goals

- Kyle Holcomb – Wake Forest
- Valentin Noël – Pittsburgh
- Veljko Petković – Pittsburgh
- Jamil Roberts – Marshall

2 goals

- Nick Blacklock – Virginia Tech
- David Coly – American
- Alexander Dexter – Pittsburgh
- Herbert Endeley – Indiana
- Julian Gomez – Monmouth
- Omar Hernandez – Wake Forest
- Hugo Kametani – Omaha
- Jon Koka – Missouri State
- Jacob Labovitz – Virginia Tech
- Zach Riviere – Georgetown
- El Mahdi Youssoufi – St. Francis Brooklyn
- Milo Yosef – Marshall

1 goal

- Rodrigo Almeida – Pittsburgh
- Mani Austmann – UNCG
- Nil Ayats – Omaha
- Nicolas Blassou – American
- Josiah Blanton – James Madison
- Daniel Bloyou – Penn State
- Jalen Bigby – Kentucky
- Victor Bezerra – Indiana
- Andrea Borg – Seton Hall
- James Brighton – Clemson
- Joe Brito – Charlotte
- Akeim Clarke – North Carolina
- Theo Collomb – UNCG
- Oliver Correa – Jacksonville
- Lucca Dourado – UCF
- Tyger Evans – Penn State
- AJ Franklin – Marquette
- Chris Hegardt – Georgetown
- Santiago Herrera – North Carolina
- Bertin Jacquesson – Pittsburgh
- Callum Johnson – Clemson
- Seth Kuhn – Penn State
- Jack Green – American
- Maouloune Goumballe – Indiana
- Jonas Linder – Monmouth
- Brock Lindow – Kentucky
- Peter Mangione – Penn State
- JP Martin – Seton Hall
- Nathan Masters – Bowling Green
- Eric Matzelevich – Maryland
- Raul Medina – Milwaukee
- Lucas Meek – Washington
- Tyrone Mondi – Oregon State
- Giovanni Montesdeoca – North Carolina
- Joshua Moreira – Jacksonville
- Reggie Nicolas – Jacksonville
- Martin Ngoh – Georgetown
- Joe Pickering – North Carolina
- Dante Polvara – Georgetown
- Claudio Repetto – Coastal Carolina
- Max Rogers – Fordham
- Bailey Rouse – Kentucky
- Ryan Sailor – Washington
- Nick Scardina – Washington
- Max Schneider – Marshall
- Sito Sena – Pittsburgh
- Mohamed Seye – Clemson
- Kasper Skraep – Coastal Carolina
- Christian Soto – Washington
- Alex Stevenson – Penn State
- Ivan Tapuskovic – St. Francis Brooklyn
- CJ Tibbling – Seton Hall
- Tristan Trager – Air Force
- Gino Vivi – UCF
- Bryce Washington – Pittsburgh
- Thomas Warr – Indiana
- Maurice Williams – Seton Hall
- Ryan Wittenbrink – Indiana
- Charlie Wehan – Stanford

1 own goal

- Coastal Carolina scored vs. Wake Forest
- Monmouth scored vs. Pittsburgh
- Penn State scored vs. UMass
- UMass scored vs. Penn State

== Records by Conference ==
Conference	Bids	Record	Pct.	R32	R16	QF	SF	F	NC
ACC	5	9–3–3	.700	5	5	3	2	–	–
C-USA	3	5–1–2	.750	3	2	1	1	1	1
Big Ten	3	4–3–1	.563	3	2	1	1	1	–
Big East	3	3–3–2	.500	3	3	2	–	–	–
Pac-12	3	3–3–0	.500	3	2	1	–	–	–
Atlantic 10	2	0–2–0	.000	2	–	–	–	–	–
WAC	2	0–2–0	.000	2	–	–	–	–	–
American	1	1–1–0	.500	1	1	–	–	–	–
MVC	1	1–1–0	.500	1	1	–	–	–	–
NEC	1	1–0–1	.750	1	–	–	–	–	–
MAAC	1	1–1–0	.500	1	–	–	–	–	–
Summit	1	1–1–0	.500	1	–	–	–	–	–
Patriot	1	0–1–1	.250	1	–	–	–	–	–
America East	1	0–1–0	.000	1	–	–	–	–	–
Big South	1	0–1–0	.000	1	–	–	–	–	–
CAA	1	0–1–0	.000	1	–	–	–	–	–
Sun Belt	1	0–1–0	.000	1	–	–	–	–	–
WCC	1	0–0–1	.500	1	–	–	–	–	–
ASUN	1	0–0–1	.500	–	–	–	–	–	–
Horizon	1	0–1–0	.000	–	–	–	–	–	–
MAC	1	0–1–0	.000	–	–	–	–	–	–
SoCon	1	0–1–0	.000	–	–	–	–	–	–

- The R32, S16, E8, F4, CG, and NC columns indicate how many teams from each conference were in the Round of 32 (second round), Round of 16 (third round), Quarterfinals, Semifinals, Final, and National Champion, respectively.
