= Jamil Roberts (footballer, born 1998) =

English footballer (born 1998)

Personal information
- Date of birth: 14 June 1998 (age 28)
- Place of birth: Langport, England
- Positions: Left-back; forward

Youth career
- 2014–2016: Plymouth Argyle

College career
Years	Team	Apps	(Gls)
2017–2021	Marshall Thundering Herd	72	(19)

Senior career*
Years	Team	Apps	(Gls)
2019	West Virginia Alliance	4	(0)
2021	Sporting Kansas City II	16	(2)
2022	South Georgia Tormenta	24	(2)
2023	Peninsula Power	22	(1)
2024	Chattanooga Red Wolves	22	(1)
2025	Truro City	1	(0)
Total		89	(6)
- * Club domestic league appearances and goals

Jamil Roberts (born 14 June 1998) is an English former professional footballer.

Roberts played college soccer in the United States for Marshall University and scored the winning goal for Marshall in the 2020 NCAA Division I men's soccer championship game.

== Youth career ==
Prior to college, Roberts played in England for the Plymouth Argyle F.C. under-18 team. He also attended Ivybridge Community College.

== College and amateur career ==
In 2017, his first season, Roberts appeared in 18 matches as a freshman, and became a mainstay in the starting lineup as a freshman. As a sophomore in 2018, Roberts scored five goals in 18 appearances for the Thundering Herd. He was also named the Conference USA Offensive Player of the Week in early November. In 2019, Roberts played in 18 matches, scoring eight times. He was named to the All-Conference USA second team. As a result of the COVID-19 pandemic, the 2020 season was postponed to the spring, with the NCAA Tournament also to be played in the spring. Ahead of the spring season, Roberts was drafted by Sporting Kansas City 77th overall in the 2021 MLS SuperDraft. However, he decided to stay at Marshall for his senior season. In the spring 2020 season, Roberts scored 2 goals in 13 regular season games. However, he came alive in the NCAA Tournament, scoring a goal in three straight games for Marshall (vs. Georgetown, vs. North Carolina, and vs. Indiana) to propel them to their first ever National Championship win.

Whilst at college, Roberts also played in the USL League Two, appearing for West Virginia Alliance FC in 2019.

== Professional career ==
=== Sporting Kansas City II ===
Sporting Kansas City selected Roberts with the 77th overall pick in the 2021 MLS Draft. After deferring joining the organization until after his senior season at Marshall, Roberts signed with the club's USL Championship affiliate Sporting Kansas City II on 1 July 2021. Roberts made his professional debut with the club on 10 July 2021 in a 1–0 victory over Atlanta United 2 when he subbed in during the 67th minute. He scored his first professional goal on 12 August 2021 in a 4–2 loss vs. Birmingham Legion FC. He went on to make 16 appearances and scored 2 goals for the club. Following the 2021 season, Kansas City opted to declined their contract option on Roberts.

=== Tormenta FC ===
On 25 March 2022, Tormenta FC announced that it had signed Roberts for the 2022 USL League One season. Roberts made his debut for Tormenta coming on for Alex Morrell in the 69th minute of a 1–0 loss to North Carolina FC. Roberts gained his first assist for the club in a 2–0 win against Birmingham Legion in the U.S. Open Cup. On 6 November 2022, Roberts came on in the 78th minute in the 2022 USL League One Final against the Chattanooga Red Wolves to score the winning goal in a 2–1 victory. On 7 December 2022, it was announced that Tormenta FC had declined Roberts option to bring him back for the 2023 season.

=== Peninsula Power ===
After leaving Tormenta FC, Roberts joined National Premier Leagues Queensland side Peninsula Power in Australia on a two-year deal ahead of the 2023 season. Roberts made his debut for Peninsula Power in a 2–1 loss against Sunshine Coast Wanderers, starting and playing 58 minutes.

=== Chattanooga Red Wolves ===
Roberts returned to USL League One on 9 January 2024, signing with Chattanooga Red Wolves.

=== Truro City FC ===
On 24 January 2025, Roberts joined Truro City F.C. for the remainder of the National League South season.

== Career statistics ==
As of 28 December 2024

Club	Season	League			Cup		Other		Total	
Club	Season	Division	Apps	Goals	Apps	Goals	Apps	Goals	Apps	Goals
West Virginia Alliance	2019	USL League Two	4	0	–		–		4	0
Sporting Kansas City II	2021	USL Championship	16	2	–		–		16	2
Tormenta FC	2022	USL League One	24	2	3	0	2	1	29	3
Peninsula Power FC	2023	NPL Queensland	22	1	1	0	0	0	23	1
Chattanooga Red Wolves SC	2024	USL League One	22	1	7	0	0	0	29	1
Truro City F.C.	2024–25	National League South	1	0	–		–		1	0
Total			89	6	11	0	2	1	100	7

== Honours ==
=== College ===
Marshall Thundering Herd

- Conference USA regular season: 2019, 2020
- Conference USA Men's Soccer Tournament: 2019
- NCAA Division I Men's Soccer Tournament: 2020

=== Individual ===
- NCAA Men's Division I Offensive MOP Award: 2020

=== Professional ===
==== South Georgia Tormenta ====
- USL League One Championship: 2022
