= Seth Kuhn =

American soccer player

Personal information
- Full name: Seth Alexander Kuhn
- Date of birth: April 4, 2000 (age 26)
- Place of birth: Wyomissing, Pennsylvania, United States
- Height: 5 ft 10 in (1.78 m)
- Position: Left midfielder

Team information
- Current team: Penn State Nittany Lions (college)
- Number: 10

Youth career
- PA Classics
- 2015–2017: Philadelphia Union

College career
Years	Team	Apps	(Gls)
2018	Duke Blue Devils	18	(0)
2019–2022	Penn State Nittany Lions	69	(8)

Senior career*
Years	Team	Apps	(Gls)
2017	Bethlehem Steel	1	(0)
2019	Reading United	9	(1)
2021	Reading United	4	(1)

International career
2015	United States U15		
- * Club domestic league appearances and goals as of 08:21, January 12, 2022 (UTC)

Seth Alexander Kuhn (born April 4, 2000) is an American soccer player who plays as a left midfielder for the Penn State Nittany Lions. In January 2022, Kuhn was selected by the New York Red Bulls in the 2022 MLS SuperDraft with the 73rd overall pick.

== Early life ==
Born in Wyomissing, Pennsylvania, Kuhn grew up playing for local U.S. Soccer Development Academy club PA Classics before joining the Philadelphia Union's YSC Academy in 2015. On December 16, 2016, Kuhn announced that he had committed to playing college soccer at Duke University, joining the Duke Blue Devils for the 2018 season. Prior to attending Duke University, Kuhn was called onto the bench for the Bethlehem Steel, the reserve affiliate for the Philadelphia Union, against Pittsburgh Riverhounds on July 15, 2017. He came on as an 84th-minute substitute for Santi Moar as the match ended in a 1–1 draw.

== College ==
Kuhn made his collegiate debut for the Duke Blue Devils on August 24, 2018, against the FIU Panthers. He appeared in 18 matches for the Blue Devils, starting seven, with no goals scored.

Following the season, on April 2, 2019, it was announced that Kuhn had transferred to Pennsylvania State University and would represent the Penn State Nittany Lions from the 2019 season. The move to the Nittany Lions reunited him with Jeff Cook, his coach while training with the Philadelphia Union academy. He made his Penn State debut on August 30, 2019, starting in a 0–5 defeat against Stanford Cardinal. On September 13, 2019, Kuhn scored his first college goal against the Villanova Wildcats in a 1–0 victory. Throughout his career at Penn State, Kuhn played in 53 matches, scoring 8 goals.

== Career ==
=== Reading United ===
During the college soccer offseason, Kuhn joined USL League Two side Reading United for the 2019 season. He made his debut for the side on May 11, 2019, against Lehigh Valley United, scoring the fifth goal in a 5–2 victory. He rejoined the club in 2021, playing in 9 matches and scoring once.

=== New York Red Bulls ===
On January 11, 2022, Kuhn was selected with the 73rd overall pick by the New York Red Bulls in the 2022 MLS SuperDraft. Following the draft, Kuhn did not sign a professional contract with the Red Bulls, and instead returned to Pennsylvania State University, joining the Nittany Lions as a graduate student for the 2022 season.

== Career statistics ==
=== Club ===
As of January 12, 2021

Appearances and goals by club, season and competition
Club	Season	League			National Cup		Continental		Total	
Club	Season	Division	Apps	Goals	Apps	Goals	Apps	Goals	Apps	Goals
Bethlehem Steel	2017	United Soccer League	1	0	—		—		1	0
Reading United	2019	USL League Two	4	1	—		—		4	1
Reading United	2021	USL League Two	9	1	—		—		9	1
Reading United	Total		13	2	0	0	0	0	13	1
Career total			14	2	0	0	0	0	14	2
