= Bill Armstrong Stadium =

Stadium in Bloomington, Indiana

- Jerry Yeagley Field
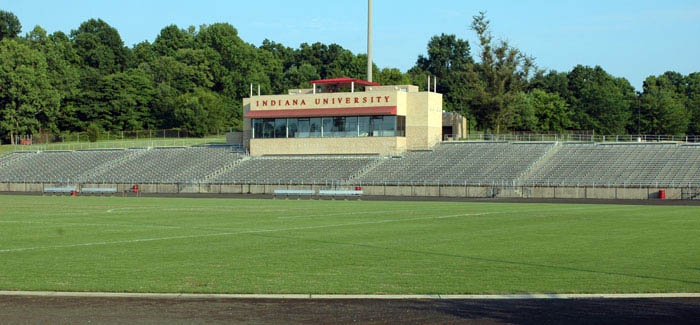
- View of the stadium in 2006
- Interactive map of Bill Armstrong Stadium
- Address: 1606 North Fee Lane; Bloomington, IN; United States
- Coordinates: 39°10′52″N 86°30′52″W
- Owner: Indiana University
- Operator: Indiana Univ. Athletics
- Capacity: 6,500
- Type: Stadium
- Surface: Grass
- Record attendance: 7,720 (September 1, 2013 vs UCLA)
- Current use: College soccer Cycling

Construction
- Opened: September 13, 1981; 44 years ago
- Renovated: 2020

Tenants
- Indiana Hoosiers (NCAA) teams: men's and * women's soccer (1981–present); Little 500 cycling (1981–present)

Website
- iuhoosiers.com/bill-armstrong-stadium

Bill Armstrong Stadium is a 6,500-capacity soccer-specific stadium and velodrome located in Bloomington, Indiana and owned by the Indiana University Bloomington. The stadium is home to the Indiana Hoosiers men's and women's soccer teams.

It also hosted the NCAA Men's Soccer Championship in 1988, and is home to the annual Little 500 track cycling race, which was featured in the 1979 Oscar-winning movie Breaking Away.

== History ==
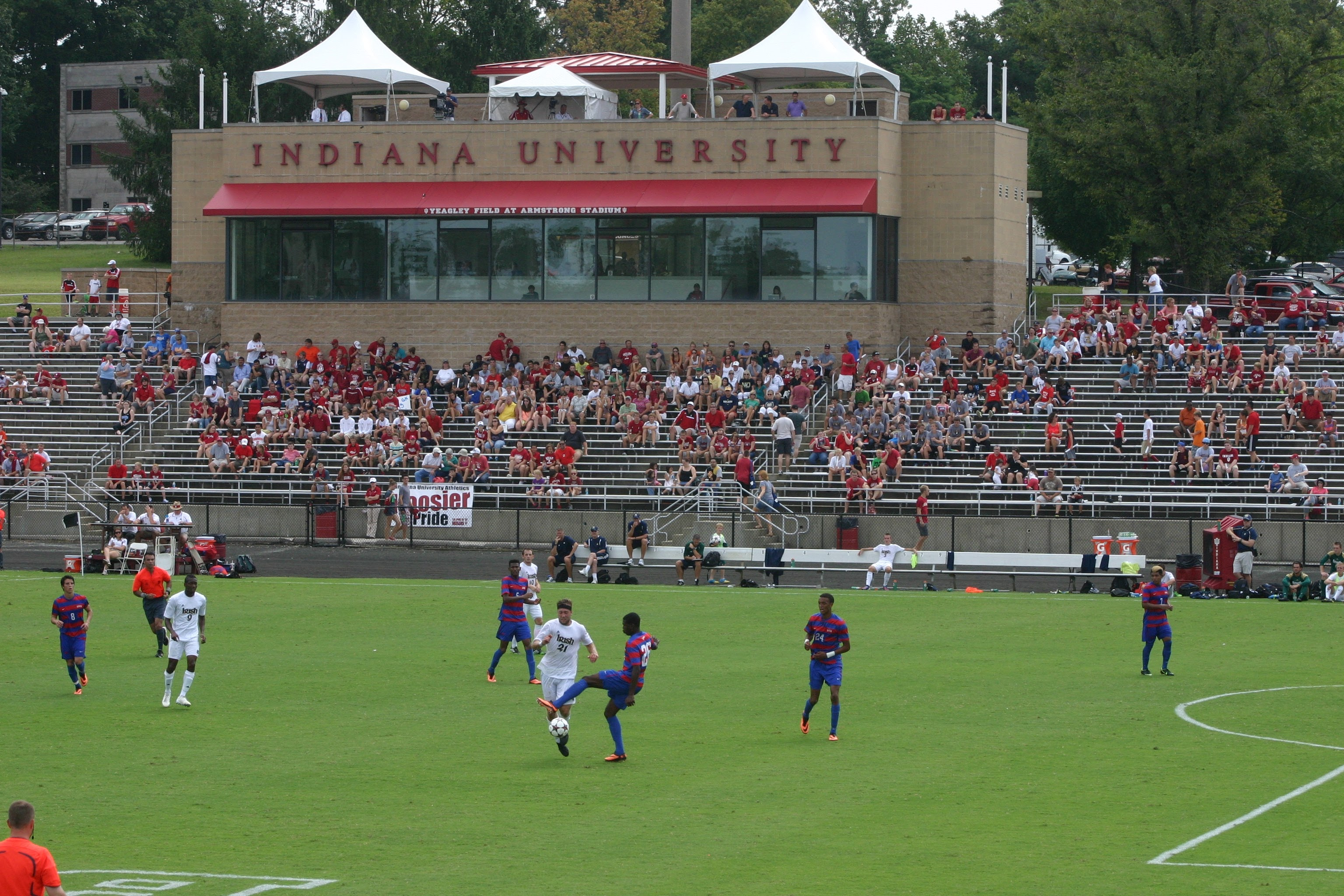
View of the press boxes during a soccer game in 2013

Construction on the stadium finished in 1981, with the 30th Running of the Little 500 being held on April 25 and the inaugural soccer game on September 13 of the same year. A $2.5 million renovation took place in 2001, bringing a new grass surface, scoreboard and grandstand. The 5,000-seat main stand includes a press facility with room for 50 members of the media. A later phase of the renovation included a 1,500-seat secondary stand on the north side of the field, bringing the stadium to its current capacity of 6,500.

On December 7, 2018, Indiana University Board of Trustees approved the proposed design to renovate portions of Armstrong stadium. The approved proposal will see the existing north grandstand demolished and replaced with a new bi-level structure. The structure will provide new locker rooms for both the men's and women's teams, a lobby, a team room, a warmup area, coaches' offices and bicycle support space. During construction, temporary seating will be constructed on the west end of the stadium; however, final seating capacity has not yet been announced.

== Features ==
=== South Grandstand Facility ===
Opened in 1981, the 5,000-seat, poured-in-place grandstand includes the nation's most complete soccer press facility, including seating for 50 members of the media, restrooms and a food service area. Directly behind the press box is a customer services building with concessions and restrooms

=== North Grandstand Facility ===
The existing grandstand facility, which opened in 1983 was demolished and is being replaced by a two-story structure. The facility will have locker rooms, a lobby, a team room, a warm up room, coaches offices, bicycle support space, conference rooms and public restrooms.

=== Jerry Yeagley Field ===
A new drainage system was installed three inches below the field's surface. Then there is a two-inch sandcap with a one-percent graded slope. The field is sprigged with Tahoma 31 Bermudagrass. The field was renamed in honor of six-time national champion coach Jerry Yeagley following his retirement in 2004. Therefore, the official name of the complex is Jerry Yeagley Field at Bill Armstrong Stadium, although it is still widely known as simply Armstrong Stadium.

== Naming ==
This stadium is named for William S. Armstrong Sr., who was the president of the Indiana University Foundation for many years. He was both a supporter of the athletic program at Indiana University and involved with the Little 500 and its activities each year. He can be seen in the movie Breaking Away as the official starter of the race, saying, "Gentlemen, mount your Roadmaster bicycles."

Preceded by Riggs Field	Host of the College Cup; 1988	Succeeded by Rutgers Stadium
