= 2023 NCAA Men's Soccer All-Americans =

- Awarded for: 2023 NCAA Division I men's soccer season

An All-American team is an honorary sports team composed of the best amateur players of a specific season for each team position—who in turn are given the honorific "All-America" and typically referred to as "All-American athletes", or simply "All-Americans". Although the honorees generally do not compete together as a unit, the term is used in U.S. team sports to refer to players who are selected by members of the national media. Walter Camp selected the first All-America team in the early days of American football in 1889. The 2023 NCAA Men's Soccer All-Americans are honorary lists that include All-American selections from the United Soccer Coaches (USC), Top Drawer Soccer (TDS), Soccer America (TSN), and College Soccer News for the 2023 NCAA Division I men's soccer season. All selectors choose at least a first, second, and third 11-man team.

Although the aforementioned lists are used to determine consensus honors, there are numerous other All-American lists. The three finalists for the Hermann Trophy are described as Hermann All-Americans. The scholar-athletes selected by College Sports Information Directors of America (CoSIDA) are termed Academic All-Americans.

== Individual All-America teams ==
=== By player ===
This list is of players who were named first-team All-Americans by each respective publication.

Key

CSN	College Soccer News
TDS	Top Drawer Soccer
USC	United Soccer Coaches
*	Consensus All-American (selected by all selectors)
†	Awarded the Hermann Trophy as national Player of the Year

List

Position	Name	School	CSN	TDS	USC	Notes
Forward	Matthew Bell*	Marshall	✓	✓	✓	SBC Player of the Year
Midfielder	Zach Bohane	Stanford	✗	✓	✗	
Defender	Kevin Bonilla*	Portland	✓	✓	✓	WCC Defender of the Year
Midfielder	Yannick Bright*	New Hampshire	✓	✓	✓	Am. East Midfielder of the Year; Hermann Trophy finalist
Forward	Marcus Caldeira	West Virginia	✓	✗	✗	
Forward	Ryan Carmichael	Hofstra	✗	✓	✗	
Goalkeeper	Bryan Dowd*	Notre Dame	✓	✓	✓	TDS National Player of the Year; ACC Goalkeeper of the Year
Defender	Morris Duggan	Marshall	✗	✓	✓	SBC Defensive Player of the Year
Forward	Logan Farrington	Oregon State	✗	✓	✗	Pac-12 Player of the Year
Midfielder	Eliot Goldthorp	Hofstra	✓	✗	✓	CAA Player of the Year
Defender	Kenny Nielsen	Georgetown	✓	✗	✗	Big East Defender of the Year
Forward	Jono Nyandjo	Charlotte	✗	✗	✓	
Forward	Charlie Sharp*	Western Michigan	✓	✓	✓	MVC Player of the Year; Hermann Trophy finalist
Forward	Jason Shokalook	Akron	✓	✗	✗	Big East Forward of the Year
Forward	Tyrese Spicer	Lipscomb	✗	✗	✓	ASUN Player of the Year; 2024 MLS SuperDraft No. 1 pick
Midfielder	Ousmane Sylla^{†}*	Clemson	✓	✓	✓	Hermann Trophy winner
Forward	Yutaro Tsukada	West Virginia	✗	✓	✗	
Defender	Garrison Tubbs*	Wake Forest	✓	✓	✓	ACC Defender of the Year
Defender	Mads Westergren	SMU	✗	✗	✓	AAC Defender of the Year

=== By team ===
All-America Team	First team		Second team		Third team	
All-America Team	Player	School	Player	School	Player	School
College Soccer News	(United States) Charlie Sharp	Western Michigan	(Trinidad and Tobago) Tyrese Spicer	Lipscomb	(United States) Alec Hughes	UMass
College Soccer News	(Canada) Marcus Caldeira	West Virginia	(Northern Ireland) Ryan Carmichael	Hofstra	(United States) Taylor Calheira	UMBC
College Soccer News	(Jamaica) Matthew Bell	Marshall	(United States) Peter Mangione	Penn State	(United States) Samuel Sarver	Indiana
College Soccer News	(United States) Jason Shokalook	Akron	(United States) Logan Farrington	Oregon State	(United States) Dylan Sing	Western Michigan
College Soccer News	(Italy) Yannick Bright	New Hampshire	(Japan) Yutaro Tsukada	West Virginia	(Germany) Jelldrik Dallman	SMU
College Soccer News	(England) Eliot Goldthorp	Hofstra	(United States) Sam Bassett	Denver	(England) James Morris	Seattle U
College Soccer News	(Senegal) Ousmane Sylla	Clemson	(United States) Zach Bohane	Stanford	(United States) David Jackson	Navy
College Soccer News	(Honduras) Kevin Bonilla	Portland	(England) Mason Tunbridge	San Diego	(United States) Tucker Lepley	UCLA
College Soccer News	(United States) Garrison Tubbs	Wake Forest	(United States) Jaylen Shannon	Western Michigan	(England) Jack Denton	Missouri State
College Soccer News	(United States) Kenny Nielsen	Georgetown	(Germany) Morris Duggan	Marshall	(United States) Jeorgio Kocevski	Syracuse
College Soccer News	(United States) Bryan Dowd	Notre Dame	(Denmark) Mads Westergren	SMU	(United States) Griffin Roach	Boston University
College Soccer News	—N/a	—N/a	(United States) Cole Johnson	SMU	(Scotland) Finn McRobb	High Point
College Soccer News	—N/a	—N/a	(United States) Kiergan Sargeant	Georgetown	(Spain) Joseba Incera	New Hampshire
Top Drawer Soccer	(United States) Bryan Dowd	Notre Dame	(Senegal) Mouhameth Thiam	Virginia	(United States) Tucker Lepley	UCLA
Top Drawer Soccer	(Senegal) Ousmane Sylla	Clemson	(Trinidad and Tobago) Tyrese Spicer	Lipscomb	(United States) Dylan Sing	Western Michigan
Top Drawer Soccer	(United States) Logan Farrington	Oregon State	(England) Eliot Goldthorp	Hofstra	(Ghana) Foster Ajago	Duke
Top Drawer Soccer	(Jamaica) Matthew Bell	Marshall	(United States) Sam Bassett	Denver	(United States) Jeorgio Kocevski	Syracuse
Top Drawer Soccer	(United States) Zach Bohane	Stanford	(United States) Femi Awodesu	Penn State	(United States) Jonathan Robinson	Western Michigan
Top Drawer Soccer	(United States) Garrison Tubbs	Wake Forest	(Germany) Jelldrik Dallman	SMU	(Spain) Hugo Bacharach	Indiana
Top Drawer Soccer	(United States) Charlie Sharp	Western Michigan	(United States) Bryce Boneau	Notre Dame	(United States) Wyatt Meyer	California
Top Drawer Soccer	(Germany) Morris Duggan	Marshall	(United States) Isaac Nehme	Denver	(United States) Brandon Parrish	Clemson
Top Drawer Soccer	(Honduras) Kevin Bonilla	Portland	(Denmark) Mads Westergren	SMU	(United States) Cole Johnson	SMU
Top Drawer Soccer	(Northern Ireland) Ryan Carmichael	Hofstra	(United States) Kenny Nielsen	Georgetown	(United States) Jason Shokalook	Akron
Top Drawer Soccer	(Italy) Yannick Bright	New Hampshire	(Jamaica) Hesron Barry	Green Bay	(United States) Luis Flores	Oral Roberts
Top Drawer Soccer	(Japan) Yutaro Tsukada	West Virginia	(United States) Alec Hughes	UMass	(Canada) Marcus Caldeira	West Virginia
United Soccer Coaches	(United States) Bryan Dowd	Notre Dame	(United States) Cole Johnson	SMU	(Spain) Joseba Incera	New Hampshire
United Soccer Coaches	(Honduras) Kevin Bonilla	Portland	(United States) Kiergan Sargeant	Georgetown	(Spain) Javier Armas	Oregon State
United Soccer Coaches	(Germany) Morris Duggan	Marshall	(United States) Kenny Nielsen	Georgetown	(Jamaica) Hesron Barry	Green Bay
United Soccer Coaches	(United States) Garrison Tubbs	Wake Forest	(United States) Jaylen Shannon	Western Michigan	(United States) Pierce Infuso	Hofstra
United Soccer Coaches	(Denmark) Mads Westergren	SMU	(United States) Sam Bassett	Denver	(United States) Nick Fernandez	Portland
United Soccer Coaches	(Italy) Yannick Bright	New Hampshire	(United States) Bailey Sparks	SMU	(United States) Tucker Lepley	UCLA
United Soccer Coaches	(England) Eliot Goldthorp	Hofstra	(England) Mason Tunbridge	San Diego	(Japan) Taimu Okiyoshi	Marshall
United Soccer Coaches	(Cameroon) Jono Nyandjo	Charlotte	(Ghana) Foster Ajago	Duke	(United States) Logan Farrington	Oregon State
United Soccer Coaches	(Jamaica) Matthew Bell	Marshall	(Canada) Marcus Caldeira	West Virginia	(Ghana) Stephen Annor Gyamfi	Virginia
United Soccer Coaches	(United States) Charlie Sharp	Western Michigan	(Northern Ireland) Ryan Carmichael	Hofstra	(France) Quenzi Huerman	North Carolina
United Soccer Coaches	(Trinidad and Tobago) Tyrese Spicer	Lipscomb	(Germany) Jelldrik Dallman	SMU	(Brazil) Lineker Rodrigues	Memphis
United Soccer Coaches	(Senegal) Ousmane Sylla	Clemson	(United States) Jason Shokalook	Akron	(United States) Samuel Sarver	Indiana
United Soccer Coaches	—N/a	—N/a	—N/a	—N/a	(Japan) Yutaro Tsukada	West Virginia

== Academic All-Americans ==
All-America Team	First team		Second team		Third team	
All-America Team	Player	School	Player	School	Player	School
CoSIDA
CoSIDA	(United States) Ethan Brandt	Western Michigan	(United States) J.T. Harms	Indiana	(Canada) Gabriel Mikina	Syracuse
CoSIDA	(United States) Tommy Silva	UCLA	(United States) Nolan Premack	Cal Baptist	(Germany) Lasse Kelp	UMBC
CoSIDA	(United States) Jason Belloli	Denver	(United States) Ethan Ash	North Florida	(Netherlands) Diego Konincks	Saint Louis
CoSIDA	(Netherlands) Youri Senden	Drexel	(Sweden) Sam Björk	Seton Hall	(Jamaica) Hesron Barry	Green Bay
CoSIDA	(United States) Wyatt Meyer	California	(Republic of Ireland) Paddy Burns	Notre Dame	(United States) Jonathan Stout	Michigan State
CoSIDA	(Spain) Marc Torrellas	Loyola Chicago	(United States) Joey Maher	Indiana	(Germany) Timo Hummrich	Fordham
CoSIDA	(United States) Brendan Herb	UNC Asheville	(Norway) Ask Ekeland	Duquesne	(United States) Zach Bohane	Stanford
CoSIDA	(United States) Nick Pariano	Duke	(Canada) Mark Fisher	Stanford	(Italy) Alessandro Arlotti	Harvard
CoSIDA	(United States) Dylan Sing	Western Michigan	(United States) Will Reilly	Stanford	(France) Victor Claudel	Florida Atlantic
CoSIDA	(Germany) Jelldrik Dallman	SMU	(United States) Charlie Sharp	Western Michigan	(United States) Peter Mangione	Penn State
CoSIDA	(Canada) Marcus Caldeira	West Virginia	(Canada) Nicholas Chateau	St. John's	(United States) Nick Zielonka	UMass
CoSIDA	—N/a	—N/a	(England) Alfie Pope	Creighton	—N/a	—N/a
United Soccer Coaches
United Soccer Coaches	(United States) Francesco Montali	Boston University	(Canada) Nick Christoffersen	Penn	—N/a	—N/a
United Soccer Coaches	(United States) Pierce Infuso	Hofstra	(Australia) Jackson Lee	West Virginia	—N/a	—N/a
United Soccer Coaches	(United States) Griffin Roach	Boston University	(United States) Ryan Schewe	Georgetown	—N/a	—N/a
United Soccer Coaches	(United States) Tommy Silva	UCLA	(Netherlands) Wessell Speel	Hofstra	—N/a	—N/a
United Soccer Coaches	(United States) Garrison Tubbs	Wake Forest	(Germany) Jonas Buechte	Akron	—N/a	—N/a
United Soccer Coaches	(Italy) Yannick Bright	New Hampshire	(United States) Brock Pope	Bellarmine	—N/a	—N/a
United Soccer Coaches	(Canada) Mark Fisher	Stanford	(United States) Riley Thomas	North Carolina	—N/a	—N/a
United Soccer Coaches	(England) Bilal Kamal	New Hampshire	(United States) Christian Buendia	Saint Louis	—N/a	—N/a
United Soccer Coaches	(United States) Eli Goldman	New Hampshire	(United States) Collin McCamy	Northwestern	—N/a	—N/a
United Soccer Coaches	(United States) Joey Maher	Indiana	—N/a	—N/a	—N/a	—N/a
United Soccer Coaches	(United States) Peter Mangione	Penn State	—N/a	—N/a	—N/a	—N/a
United Soccer Coaches	(United States) Charlie Sharp	Western Michigan	—N/a	—N/a	—N/a	—N/a
United Soccer Coaches	(United States) Dylan Sing	Western Michigan	—N/a	—N/a	—N/a	—N/a
United Soccer Coaches	(Japan) Yutaro Tsukada	West Virginia	—N/a	—N/a	—N/a	—N/a
United Soccer Coaches	(United States) Justin Weiss	Northwestern	—N/a	—N/a	—N/a	—N/a

== Freshman All-Americans ==
All-America Team	First team		Second team		Third team	
All-America Team	Player	School	Player	School	Player	School
College Soccer News	(United States) Alex Harris	Cornell	(Canada) Kimani Stewart-Baynes	Maryland	(United States) Ryan Okerayi	Houston Christian
College Soccer News	(Ghana) Stephen Annor Gyamfi	Virginia	(Ghana) Collins Oduro	Indiana	(Denmark) Victor Faaborg Christensen	Presbyterian
College Soccer News	(Iceland) Úlfur Björnsson	Duke	(Brazil) Marco Silva	Marshall	(United States) Noeh Hernandez	DePaul
College Soccer News	(United States) Barzee Blama	Mercer	(Lebanon) Saad Chaouki	Rider	(Finland) Saku Heiskanen	UCF
College Soccer News	(Colombia) Joshua Saavedra	LIU	(United States) Donovan Phillip	Oakland	(United States) Efetobo Aror	Portland
College Soccer News	(United States) Liam O'Gara	Wake Forest	(United States) Richard Monath	Delaware	(Israel) Niv Berkovitz	SMU
College Soccer News	(United States) Noah James	Western Michigan	(United States) Miles Bonham	Dayton	(Cameroon) Martin Kwende Jr.	Santa Clara
College Soccer News	(Germany) Luca Nikolai	James Madison	(France) Arthur Duquenne	Clemson	(United States) Drew Hardin	Cal Baptist
College Soccer News	(United States) Reid Fisher	San Diego State	(United States) Kieran Chandler	UConn	(England) Chris Ogor	Loyola (MD)
College Soccer News	(Germany) Nick Lockermann	Vermont	(United States) Will Eby	Michigan State	(United States) Fritz Volmar	Northwestern
College Soccer News	(Senegal) Pape Mar Boye	Clemson	(United States) Rowan Schnebly	Stanford	(United States) Aidan Crawford	Loyola Chicago
College Soccer News	(United States) Julian Eyestone	Duke	(Republic of Ireland) Pearse O'Brien	Providence	(Poland) Jakub Grzesiak	Oral Roberts
Top Drawer Soccer	(United States) Alex Harris	Cornell	(France) Arthur Duquenne	Clemson	(Portugal) Rai Pinto	Marshall
Top Drawer Soccer	(Senegal) Pape Mar Boye	Clemson	(Ghana) Collins Oduro	Indiana	(Finland) Saku Heiskanen	UCF
Top Drawer Soccer	(Ghana) Stephen Annor Gyamfi	Virginia	(United States) Caden Grabfelder	Penn State	(United States) Reid Fisher	San Diego State
Top Drawer Soccer	(United States) Liam O'Gara	Wake Forest	(United States) Miles Bonham	Dayton	(United States) Alex Barger	Indiana
Top Drawer Soccer	(United States) Julian Eyestone	Duke	(Germany) Nick Lockermann	Vermont	(Poland) Jakub Grzesiak	Oral Roberts
Top Drawer Soccer	(Germany) Luca Nikolai	James Madison	(United States) Dylan Hooper	Stanford	(United States) Kieran Chandler	UConn
Top Drawer Soccer	(United States) Noah James	Western Michigan	(Republic of Ireland) Pearse O'Brien	Providence	(United States) Fritz Volmar	Northwestern
Top Drawer Soccer	(Iceland) Úlfur Björnsson	Duke	(Brazil) Marco Silva	Marshall	(Mexico) Nathan Rodrigues	Loyola Marymount
Top Drawer Soccer	(Colombia) Joshua Saavedra	LIU	(Canada) Kimani Stewart-Baynes	Maryland	(United States) Aidan Crawford	Loyola Chicago
Top Drawer Soccer	(United States) Noeh Hernandez	DePaul	(Lebanon) Saad Chaouki	Rider	(Israel) Niv Berkovitz	SMU
Top Drawer Soccer	(United States) Will Eby	Michigan State	(United States) Rowan Schnebly	Stanford	(United States) Richard Monath	Delaware
