= Pac-12 Conference men's soccer tournament =

College soccer tournament

- Sport: College soccer
- Conference: Pac-12
- Number of teams: 4
- Format: Single-elimination
- Current stadium: Higher seed
- Played: 2026–present
- Last contest: 2026
- Current champion: Oregon State (1st title)
- Official website: pac-12.com/sports/msoc

The Pac-12 Conference men's soccer tournament will be the conference championship tournament in college soccer for the Pac-12 Conference (Pac-12). The tournament will be held every year starting in 2026.

The winner will receive the conference's automatic bid to the NCAA Division I men's soccer tournament.

== History ==
The Pac-12 Conference began sponsoring men's varsity soccer in 2000. Five then-Pac-12 members, California, Oregon State, Stanford, UCLA, and Washington, along with affiliate members, Fresno State (Note: Fresno State University played as an affiliate member from 2002–03, before the program disbanded.) and San Diego State (Note: San Diego State joined the Pac-12 as an affiliate member for men's soccer in 2005, and joined as a full-time member for all sports in 2026.), competed for the Pac-12 championship. However, from 2000 through 2023, the regular season champion was also named the Pac-12 overall champion and earned the conference's automatic berth into the NCAA Division I men's soccer tournament. With the drastic change in membership during the 2021–2026 NCAA conference realignment, the conference dramatically restructured its membership. This included the original men's soccer members of Oregon State and San Diego State, the latter becoming a full Pac-12 member. They were joined by full-time member Gonzaga, as well as four affiliate members: Cal Baptist, Cal Poly, UC Riverside, and, for the 2026 season only, UC San Diego (Note: UC San Diego will only play in the Pac-12 for 2026 before rejoining the Big West for 2027–28.).

== Champions ==
The following is a list of Pac-12 Conference Tournament winners:

=== Pac-12 regular season era (2000–2023) ===
Key

- (1) – Title number
- a.e.t. – Match went to extra time
- p – Match decided by a penalty shootout after extra time
- – Winning team reached College Cup
- – Winning team won National Championship

Ed.	Year	Champion	Record (W-L-T)	Pts.	Runner-up	Record (W-L-T)	Pts.
1	2000	Washington (1)	7–1–0 (.875)	21	Stanford	6–2–0 (.750)	18
2	2001	Stanford (1)	6–1–1 (.813)	19	UCLA	5–2–1 (.688)	16
3	2002	UCLA (1)	8–2–0 (.800)	24	California	6–3–1 (.650)	19
4	2003	UCLA (2)	10–0–0 (1.000)	30	Oregon State	7–3–0 (.700)	21
5	2004	UCLA (3)	6–2–0 (.750)	18	California	4–3–1 (.563)	13
6	2005	UCLA (4)	7–1–2 (.800)	23	California	6–3–1 (.650)	19
7	2006	California (1)	7–3–0 (.700)	21	San Diego State	5–2–3 (.650)	18
8	2007	California (2)	6–3–1 (.650)	19	San Diego State	4–4–2 (.500)	14
9	2008	UCLA (5)	7–1–2 (.800)	23	California	5–2–3 (.650)	18
10	2009	UCLA (6)	5–1–4 (.700)	19	Oregon State	5–4–1 (.550)	16
11	2010	California (3)	8–1–1 (.850)	25	UCLA	8–2–0 (.800)	24
12	2011	UCLA (7)	10–0–0 (1.000)	30	Washington	7–3–0 (.700)	21
13	2012	UCLA (8)	8–1–1 (.850)	25	Washington	7–1–2 (.800)	23
14	2013	Washington (2)	7–1–2 (.800)	23	UCLA	6–1–3 (.750)	21
15	2014	Stanford (2)	6–1–3 (.750)	21	UCLA	6–2–2 (.700)	20
16	2015	Stanford (3)	7–1–2 (.800)	23	UCLA	5–4–1 (.550)	16
17	2016	Stanford (4)	8–1–1 (.850)	25	Washington	6–4–0 (.600)	18
18	2017	Stanford (5)	9–0–1 (.950)	28	California	6–4–0 (.600)	18
19	2018	Stanford (6)	7–2–1 (.750)	22	Oregon State	6–3–1 (.650)	19
20	2019	Washington (3)	8–2–0 (.800)	24	Stanford	6–2–2 (.700)	20
21	2020 (Note: The 2020 season was played from February to April 2021 due to the COVID-19 pandemic.)	Stanford (7)	7–2–1 (.750)	22	Washington	7–3–0 (.700)	21
22	2021	Oregon State (1)	7–1–2 (.800)	23	Washington	6–1–2 (.778)	20
23	2022	Washington (4)	7–1–2 (.800)	23	Stanford	4–2–4 (.600)	16
24	2023	UCLA (9)	6–0–4 (.800)	23	Oregon State	4–1–5 (.650)	16

=== Tournament era (2026–present) ===
Key

- (1) – Title number
- a.e.t. – Match went to extra time
- p – Match decided by a penalty shootout after extra time
- – Winning team reached College Cup
- – Winning team won regular season
- – Winning team won National Championship

Ed.	Year	Champion	Score	Runner-up	MVP	Venue	City
1	2026	Oregon State (1)	2–1	San Diego State	John Nicolson (Oregon State)	Lorenz Field	Corvallis, OR

== All-time tournament record by team ==
Updated through the 2026 Tournament:

School	W	L	T	Pct.	Championships	Final appearances	Championship Years	Championship Appearances
Cal Poly	0	0	0	–	0	0		
Cal Baptist	0	1	0	.000	0	0		
Gonzaga	0	0	0	–	0	0		
Oregon State	2	0	0	1.000	1	1	2026	2026
San Diego State	1	1	0	.500	0	1		2026
UC Riverside	0	1	0	.000	0	0		
UC San Diego	0	0	0	–	0	0		

== See also ==
- Pac-12 Conference women's soccer tournament
