= 2020 Stanford Cardinal men's soccer team =

American college soccer season

2020 Stanford Cardinal men's soccer

Pac-12 champions

NCAA Tournament, Third round
- Conference: Pac-12 Conference
- U. Soc. Coaches poll: No. 8
- Record: 10–3–1 (7–2–1 Pac-12)
- Head coach: Jeremy Gunn (9th season)
- Assistant coaches: Oige Kennedy (5th season); Ben Moane (2nd season)
- Home stadium: Laird Q. Cagan Stadium

2020 Pac-12 Conference men's soccer standings
	Conf.					Overall
Team	W		L		T	W		L		T
No. 10 Stanford †	7	–	2	–	1	10	–	3	–	1
No. 8 Washington +	7	–	3	–	0	12	–	4	–	0
No. 18 Oregon State +	6	–	4	–	0	9	–	5	–	0
California	4	–	5	–	1	4	–	5	–	1
UCLA	2	–	6	–	2	3	–	7	–	2
San Diego State	1	–	7	–	2	1	–	7	–	2
† – Conference champion on points per game + – Also invited to the 2020 NCAA tournament; As of May 28, 2021; Rankings from United Soccer Coaches

The 2020 Stanford Cardinal men's soccer team represented Stanford University during the 2020 NCAA Division I men's soccer season. They were led by ninth year head coach Jeremy Gunn.

== Effects of the COVID-19 pandemic ==
Due to the COVID-19 pandemic, on August 13, 2020, the Pac-12 Conference postponed all fall sports through the end of the calendar year.

On November 4, 2020, the NCAA approved a plan for college soccer to be played in the spring.

== Roster ==
Source: Note: Flags indicate national team as defined under FIFA eligibility rules; some limited exceptions apply. Players may hold more than one non-FIFA nationality.

No.	Pos.	Nation	Player
1	GK	(England) ENG	Andrew Thomas
2	DF	(United States) USA	Andrew Aprahamian
3	DF	(United States) USA	Keegan Tingey
4	MF	(United States) USA	Conner Maurer
5	DF	(United States) USA	Keegan Hughes
6	MF	(United States) USA	Mark Fisher
7	MF	(United States) USA	Will Richmond
8	MF	(United States) USA	Cam Cilley
9	FW	(United States) USA	Gabe Segal
10	FW	(United States) USA	Charlie Wehan
11	FW	(Burkina Faso) BFA	Ousseni Bouda
12	DF	(United States) USA	Ryan Ludwick
14	FW	(United States) USA	Zach Ryan
15	FW	(United States) USA	Rhys de Sota

No.	Pos.	Nation	Player
16	MF	(United States) USA	Layton Purchase
17	MF	(United States) USA	Connor Evans
18	MF	(United States) USA	Aiden Weaver
19	FW	(United States) USA	Jack O'Brien
20	FW	(England) ENG	Carlo Agostinelli
21	DF	(United States) USA	Ryan Dunn
24	DF	(United States) USA	Nolan Evans
25	DF	(United States) USA	Noah Adnan
26	MF	(Haiti) HAI	Jean Laguerre
30	GK	(United States) USA	Eliot Jones
31	GK	(United States) USA	Kyle Orciuch
32	GK	(United States) USA	Max Lau
33	GK	(Hong Kong) HKG	Dan Healy

== Schedule ==
February 12, 2021 Non-conference	Stanford	4–0	Pacific	Stanford, CA
4:00 p.m. PT	Gabe Segal 57'; Will Richmond 69'; Zach Ryan 78'; Ryan Ludwick 79'	Report		Stadium: Laird Q. Cagan Stadium; Attendance: 0

February 15, 2021 Non-conference	Stanford	5–0	San Francisco	Stanford, CA
5:00 p.m. PT	Keegan Tingey 18'; Will Richmond 25', 59'; Zach Ryan 36'; Charlie Wehan 78'	Report		Stadium: Laird Q. Cagan Stadium; Attendance: 0

February 20, 2021 Conference	California	1–3	Stanford	Berkeley, CA
6:00 p.m. PT		Report	Gabe Segal 36'; Zach Ryan 65', 77'	Stadium: Witter Rugby Field; Attendance: 0

February 27, 2021 Conference	San Diego State	0–1 (a.e.t.)	Stanford	San Diego, CA
6:00 p.m. PT		Report	Gabe Segal 91'	Stadium: SDSU Sports Deck; Attendance: 0

March 6, 2021 Conference	Stanford	4–0	UCLA	Stanford, CA
2:00 p.m. PT	Keegan Tingey 40'; Jack O'Brien 62'; Charlie Whan 68'; Zach Ryan 76'	Report		Stadium: Laird Q. Cagan Stadium; Attendance: 0

March 13, 2021 Conference	Stanford	3–2	Oregon State	Stanford, CA
3:00 p.m. PT	Will Richmond 34'; Zach Ryan 36'; Gabe Segal 80'	Report	Gloire Amanda 13', 17'	Stadium: Laird Q. Cagan Stadium; Attendance: 0

March 20, 2021 Conference	Washington	1–0	Stanford	Seattle, WA
1:00 p.m. PT	Dylan Teves 85'	Report		Stadium: Husky Soccer Stadium; Attendance: 0

March 24, 2021 Conference	Stanford	0–0	California	Stanford, CA
7:00 p.m. PT		Report		Stadium: Laird Q. Cagan Stadium; Attendance: 0

March 28, 2021 Conference	UCLA	0–3	Stanford	Los Angeles, CA
2:00 p.m. PT		Report	Zach Ryan 23'; Rhys De Sota 42'; Gabe Segal 68'	Stadium: Wallis Annenberg Stadium; Attendance: 0

April 3, 2021 Conference	Stanford	3–1	San Diego State	Stanford, CA
3:00 p.m. PT	Gabe Segal 23'; Zach Ryan 36'; Charlie Wehan 45'	Report	Andre Ochoa 32'	Stadium: Laird Q. Cagan Stadium; Attendance: 100

April 10, 2021 Conference	Oregon State	3–2	Stanford	Stanford, CA
12:00 p.m. PT	Gloire Amanda 9'; Tyrone Mondi 14'; Sofiane Mondi 41'		Zach Ryan 3'; Own Goal 52'	Stadium: Paul Lorenz Field; Attendance: 142

April 17, 2021 Conference	Stanford	1–0 (a.e.t.)	Washington	Stanford, CA
12:30 p.m. PT	Zach Ryan 97'			Stadium: Laird Q. Cagan Stadium; Attendance: 136

=== Postseason ===
==== NCAA Tournament ====
May 2, 2021 Second round	Stanford	1–0 (a.e.t.)	Omaha	Greensboro, North Carolina
5:00 p.m. EDT	Charlie Wehan 90'	Report		Stadium: UNCG Soccer Stadium; Attendance: 111

May 6, 2021 Third round	Stanford	0–1	North Carolina	Greensboro, North Carolina
6:00 p.m. EDT		Report	Joe Pickering 13'	Stadium: UNCG Soccer Stadium; Attendance: 185
