= 2020 Oregon State Beavers men's soccer team =

American college soccer season

2020 Oregon State Beavers men's soccer

NCAA Tournament, Second round
- Conference: Pac-12 Conference
- U. Soc. Coaches poll: No. 18
- Record: 9–5–0 (6–4–0 Pac-12)
- Head coach: Terry Boss (3rd season)
- Assistant coaches: B. J. Craig (3rd season); Clint Long (3rd season); Ryan Zinkhan (3rd season)
- Home stadium: Lorenz Field

2020 Pac-12 Conference men's soccer standings
	Conf.					Overall
Team	W		L		T	W		L		T
No. 10 Stanford †	7	–	2	–	1	10	–	3	–	1
No. 8 Washington +	7	–	3	–	0	12	–	4	–	0
No. 18 Oregon State +	6	–	4	–	0	9	–	5	–	0
California	4	–	5	–	1	4	–	5	–	1
UCLA	2	–	6	–	2	3	–	7	–	2
San Diego State	1	–	7	–	2	1	–	7	–	2
† – Conference champion on points per game + – Also invited to the 2020 NCAA tournament; As of May 28, 2021; Rankings from United Soccer Coaches

The 2019 Oregon State Beavers men's soccer team represented Oregon State University during the 2020 NCAA Division I men's soccer season and the 2020 Pac-12 Conference men's soccer season. The 2019 season was Terry Boss's third year as head coach for the program.

== Effects of the COVID-19 pandemic on the season ==
On August 13, 2020, the Pac-12 Conference postponed all fall sports through the end of the calendar year.

On November 4, 2020, the NCAA approved a plan for college soccer to be played in the spring.

== Schedule ==
Date Time, TV	Rank^{#}	Opponent^{#}	Result	Record	Site (Attendance) City, State
Non-conference regular season
February 3, 2021*; 5:00 p.m.		Eastern Oregon	W 6–0	1–0–0	Lorenz Field (1); Corvallis, OR
February 8, 2021*; 5:00 p.m.		Portland	W 1–0	2–0–0	Lorenz Field (1); Corvallis, OR
February 13, 2021*; 2:30 p.m.		Gonzaga	W 2–0	3–0–0	Lorenz Field (0); Corvallis, OR
Pac-12 Conference season
February 20, 2021; 2:30 p.m., UWLS-1		at Washington	W 2–1	4–0–0 (1–0–0)	Husky Soccer Stadium (0); Seattle, WA
February 27, 2021; 12:00 p.m., OSLS-3		UCLA	W 2–1	5–0–0 (2–0–0)	Lorenz Field (0); Corvallis, OR
March 6, 2021; 6:00 p.m., OSLS-3	No. 10	California	W 4–0	6–0–0 (3–0–0)	Lorenz Field (0); Corvallis, OR
March 13, 2021; 3:00 p.m., P12N	No. 5	at No. 2 Stanford	L 2–3	6–1–0 (3–1–0)	Cagan Stadium (0); Palo Alto, CA
March 20, 2021; 12:30 p.m., OSLS-3	No. 4	San Diego State	W 4–0	7–1–0 (4–1–0)	Lorenz Field (40); Corvallis, OR
March 24, 2021; 4:00 p.m., P12N	No. 3	No. 4 Washington	L 1–2	7–2–0 (4–2–0)	Lorenz Field (40); Corvallis, OR
March 28, 2021; 7:00 p.m.	No. 3	at California	L 0–1	7–3–0 (4–3–0)	Witter Rugby Field (0); Berkeley, CA
April 3, 2021; 3:00 p.m., P12N	No. 19	at UCLA	L 1–2	7–4–0 (4–4–0)	Wallis Annenberg Stadium (0); Los Angeles, CA
April 10, 2021; 5:00 p.m., P12N		No. 5 Stanford	W 3–2	8–4–0 (5–4–0)	Lorenz Field (142); Corvallis, OR
April 17, 2021; 2:00 p.m., YouTube	No. 19	at San Diego State	W 4–0	9–4–0 (6–4–0)	SDSU Sports Deck (45); San Diego, CA
NCAA Tournament
May 2, 2021*; 1:00 p.m.	No. 15	vs. Virginia Tech; Second round	L 1–2 ^{OT}	9–5–0	Macpherson Stadium (300); Greensboro, NC
*Non-conference game. ^{#}Rankings from United Soccer Coaches. (#) Tournament seedings in parentheses. All times are in Pacific Time.
