= 2020 NCAA Men's Soccer All-Americans =

An All-American team is an honorary sports team composed of the best amateur players of a specific season for each team position—who in turn are given the honorific "All-America" and typically referred to as "All-American athletes", or simply "All-Americans". Although the honorees generally do not compete together as a unit, the term is used in U.S. team sports to refer to players who are selected by members of the national media. Walter Camp selected the first All-America team in the early days of American football in 1889. The 2020 NCAA Men's Soccer All-Americans are honorary lists that include All-American selections from the United Soccer Coaches (USC), Top Drawer Soccer (TDS), Soccer America (TSN), and College Soccer News for the 2020 NCAA Division I men's soccer season. All selectors choose at least a first, second, and third 11-man team.

Although the aforementioned lists are used to determine consensus honors, there are numerous other All-American lists. The three finalists for the Hermann Trophy are described as Hermann All-Americans. The ten finalists for the Senior CLASS Award are described as Senior All-Americans. Other All-American lists include those determined by Hero Sports and many others. The scholar-athletes selected by College Sports Information Directors of America (CoSIDA) are termed Academic All-Americans.

== Individual All-America teams ==
=== By player ===
This list is of players who were named first-team All-Americans by each respective publication.

Key

CSN	College Soccer News
SA	Soccer America
TDS	Top Drawer Soccer
USC	United Soccer Coaches
*	Consensus All-American (selected by all selectors)
†	Awarded the Hermann Trophy as national Player of the Year

List

Position	Name	School	CSN	SA	TDS	USC	Notes
Goalkeeper	Roman Celentano	Indiana	✓	—	✓	—	Big Ten Goalkeeper of the Year
Goalkeeper	Giannis Nikopolidis	Georgetown	—	✓	—	✓	Big East Goalkeeper of the Year
Defender	Bridger Hansen	New Hampshire	—	✓	—	✓	America East Defender of the Year
Defender	Kyle Hiebert	Missouri State	✓	✓	—	✓	CoSIDA Player of the Year
Defender	Tom Judge	James Madison	✓	✓	—	✓	
Defender	Jasper Löeffelsend	Pitt	—	—	✓	—	ACC Defender of the Year
Defender	Gerardo Lopez	Loyola Marymount	—	—	✓	—	WCC Defender of the Year
Defender	Charlie Ostrem	Washington	✓	—	✓	—	Pac-12 Defender of the Year
Midfielder	Noel Caliskan	Loyola Marymount	—	—	✓	—	WCC Player of the Year
Midfielder	Vitor Dias*	Marshall	✓	✓	✓	✓	C-USA Player of the Year
Midfielder	Valentin Noel*	Pitt	✓	✓	✓	✓	ACC Offensive Player of the Year
Midfielder	Veljko Petković	Pitt	—	—	✓	—	TDS National Player of the Year
Midfielder	Dante Polvara	Georgetown	—	✓	✓	✓	
Midfielder	Dylan Teves*	Washington	✓	✓	✓	✓	
Forward	Gloire Amanda†	Oregon State	✓	✓	✓	✓	Hermann Trophy winner
Forward	Victor Bezerra*	Indiana	✓	✓	✓	✓	Big Ten Offensive Player of the Year
Forward	Zach Ryan	Stanford	✓	✓	—	✓	Pac-12 Player of the Year
Forward	Kimarni Smith	Clemson	✓	—	—	—	

=== By team ===
All-America Team	First team		Second team		Third team	
All-America Team	Player	School	Player	School	Player	School
College Soccer News	Zach Ryan	Stanford	Matthew Myers	High Point	Giovanni Montesdeoca	North Carolina
College Soccer News	Victor Bezerra	Indiana	C. J. Tibbling	Seton Hall	Hugo Kametani	Omaha
College Soccer News	Gloire Amanda	Oregon State	Danny Bloyou	Penn State	Lucas Sunesson	Marquette
College Soccer News	Kimarni Smith	Clemson	Dante Polvara	Georgetown	Noah Jensen	Oakland
College Soccer News	Valentin Noel	Pitt	Daniel Pereira	Virginia Tech	Billy Hency	Loyola Chicago
College Soccer News	Dylan Teves	Washington	Justin Rasmussen	Grand Canyon	Noel Caliskan	Loyola Marymount
College Soccer News	Vitor Dias	Marshall	Isaiah Parenta	Wake Forest	Jonas Fjeldberg	Dayton
College Soccer News	Charlie Ostrem	Washington	Bridger Hansen	New Hampshire	Patrick Hogan	Charlotte
College Soccer News	Kyle Hiebert	Missouri State	Jasper Loeffelsend	Pitt	Spencer Glass	Indiana
College Soccer News	Tom Judge	James Madison	Rio Hope-Gund	Georgetown	Nick Hazel	Lafayette
College Soccer News	Roman Celentano	Indiana	Yanis Leerman	UCF	Jacob Graiber	UIC
College Soccer News			Giannis Nikopolidis	Georgetown	T. J. Bush	James Madison
Soccer America	Giannis Nikopolidis	Georgetown	Roman Celentano	Indiana	T. J. Bush	James Madison
Soccer America	Bridger Hansen	New Hampshire	Luca Dahn	Seton Hall	Spencer Glass	Indiana
Soccer America	Kyle Hiebert	Missouri State	Rio Hope-Gund	Georgetown	Nick Hazel	Lafayette
Soccer America	Tom Judge	James Madison	Yanis Leerman	UCF	Charlie Ostrem	Washington
Soccer America	Vitor Dias	Marshall	Jasper Loeffelsend	Pitt	Josh Dolling	Missouri State
Soccer America	Dante Polvara	Georgetown	Noel Caliskan	Loyola Marymount	Alex Nagy	Vermont
Soccer America	Dylan Teves	Washington	Noah Jensen	Oakland	Justin Rasmussen	Grand Canyon
Soccer America	Gloire Amanda	Oregon State	Isaiah Parente	Wake Forest	Pierre Reedy	Penn State
Soccer America	Victor Bezerra	Indiana	M. D. Myers	High Point	Danny Bloyou	Penn State
Soccer America	Zach Ryan	Stanford	Lukas Sunesson	Marquette	Hugo Kametani	Omaha
Soccer America	Valentin Noel	Pitt	C. J. Tibbling	Seton Hall	Paul Mayer	New Hampshire
Soccer America					Giovanni Montesdeoca	North Carolina
Top Drawer Soccer	Veljko Petkovic	Pitt	Noel Caliskan	Loyola Marymount	Sofiane Djeffal	Oregon State
Top Drawer Soccer	Victor Bezerra	Indiana	Tom Judge	James Madison	Kyle Holcomb	Wake Forest
Top Drawer Soccer	Valentin Noel	Pitt	Giannis Nikopolidis	Georgetown	Sebastian Chalbaud	High Point
Top Drawer Soccer	Gloire Amanda	Oregon State	Kyle Hiebert	Missouri State	Zach Ryan	Stanford
Top Drawer Soccer	Vitor Dias	Marshall	Giovanni Montesdeoca	North Carolina	Esai Omea Easley	Grand Canyon
Top Drawer Soccer	Dante Polvara	Georgetown	Gino Vivi	UCF	Alec Smir	North Carolina
Top Drawer Soccer	Dylan Teves	Washington	Matthew Myers	High Point	Noah Jensen	Oakland
Top Drawer Soccer	Gerardo Lopez	Loyola Marymount	Nico Benalcazar	Wake Forest	Nathan Dossantos	Marshall
Top Drawer Soccer	Jasper Loeffelsend	Pitt	Sebastian Schacht	St. Mary's (CA)	C. J. Tibbling	Seton Hall
Top Drawer Soccer	Charlie Ostrem	Washington	Marc Ybarra	Michigan	Bridger Hansen	New Hampshire
Top Drawer Soccer	Roman Celentano	Indiana	Nicolo Mulatero	Missouri State	Josh Dolling	Missouri State
Top Drawer Soccer	Noel Caliskan	Loyola Marymount	Sean Zawadzki	Georgetown	Justin Malou	Clemson
United Soccer Coaches	Giannis Nikopolidis	Georgetown	Roman Celentano	Indiana	T. J. Bush	James Madison
United Soccer Coaches	Bridger Hansen	New Hampshire	Luca Dahn	Seton Hall	Spencer Glass	Indiana
United Soccer Coaches	Kyle Hiebert	Missouri State	Rio Hope-Gund	Georgetown	Nick Hazel	Lafayette
United Soccer Coaches	Tom Judge	James Madison	Yanis Leerman	UCF	Charlie Ostrem	Washington
United Soccer Coaches	Vitor Dias	Marshall	Jasper Loeffelsend	Pitt	Josh Dolling	Missouri State
United Soccer Coaches	Dante Polvara	Georgetown	Noel Caliskan	Loyola Marymount	Alex Nagy	Vermont
United Soccer Coaches	Dylan Teves	Washington	Noah Jensen	Oakland	Justin Rasmussen	Grand Canyon
United Soccer Coaches	Gloire Amanda	Oregon State	Isaiah Parente	Wake Forest	Pierre Reedy	Penn State
United Soccer Coaches	Victor Bezerra	Indiana	M. D. Myers	High Point	Danny Bloyou	Penn State
United Soccer Coaches	Zach Ryan	Stanford	Lukas Sunesson	Marquette	Hugo Kametani	Omaha
United Soccer Coaches	Valentin Noel	Pitt	C. J. Tibbling	Seton Hall	Paul Mayer	New Hampshire
United Soccer Coaches					Giovanni Montesdeoca	North Carolina

== Academic All-Americans ==
CoSIDA names three Academic All-American teams for the 2020 season. Kyle Hiebert of Missouri State was named the Academic All-American of the Year by CoSIDA.

First team		Second team		Third team	
Player	School	Player	School	Player	School
Andrew Thomas	Stanford	Michael Creek	Missouri State	C. J. Tibbling	Seton Hall
David Grana	Saint Joseph's	Spencer Glass	Indiana	Will Palmquist	Denver
Joel Harrison	Michigan	Jacob Graiber	UIC	Jordan Broadwater	East Tennessee State
Kyle Hiebert	Missouri State	Patrick Hogan	Charlotte	Mark Brown	Utah Valley
Kevin Morris	West Virginia	Matt Nocita	Navy	Nick Dauchot	Loyola Marymount
Zach Maas	Utah Valley	Billy Hency	Loyola Chicago	Daniel Strachan	Akron
Pierre Reedy	Penn State	Alan Kahlenbeck	Saint Joseph's	Matthew Fearnley	Georgia State
Lucas Rosa	Saint Francis (PA)	Storm Strongin	Hofstra	Matt Thorsheim	Bucknell
Zach Ryan	Stanford	Marc Ybarra	Michigan	Taylor Durall	UNC Asheville
Lukas Sunesson	Marquette	Victor Bezerra	Indiana	Jack Lynn	Notre Dame
Rene White	NJIT	Mike Melaragni	Western Michigan	Matthew Vowinkel	Hofstra

== Senior All-Americans ==
The 10 finalists for the Senior CLASS Award are considered Senior All-Americans.

Player	Position	School
Jacob Graiber	Defender	UIC
Justin Malou	Defender	Clemson
Thomas M'Barek	Defender	Cleveland State
Jacob Montes	Midfielder	Georgetown
Yannik Oettl	Goalkeeper	UCF
George Proctor	Defender	Georgia State
Tor Saunders	Goalkeeper	Coastal Carolina
Chris Sullivan	Midfielder	Bowling Green
Joel Walker	Forward	Oregon State
Marc Ybarra	Midfielder	Michigan

== Freshman All-Americans ==
All-America Team	First team		Second team		Third team	
All-America Team	Player	School	Player	School	Player	School
College Soccer News	Beto Soto	Marquette	Nonso Adimabua	San Francisco	Duncan McGuire	Creighton
College Soccer News	Alex Meinhard	Tulsa	Logan Farrington	Milwaukee	Jake Raine	Furman
College Soccer News	Alec Hughes	UMass	Emil Jaaskelainen	LIU	Ryan Carmichael	Hofstra
College Soccer News	Bertin Jacquesson	Pitt	Theo Collomb	UNCG	Maximilian Moeller	Grand Canyon
College Soccer News	Mark Fisher	Stanford	Filip Mirkovic	Pitt	Jony Muñoz	UMKC
College Soccer News	Peter Stroud	Duke	Sami Charaf Amal	Campbell	Cao Chaves	Jacksonville
College Soccer News	Laurence Wootton	Ohio State	Andre Ochoa	San Diego State	Gevork Diarbian	Providence
College Soccer News	Peter Mangione	Penn State	Christian Buendia	Saint Louis	David Jackson	Navy
College Soccer News	Garrison Tubbs	Wake Forest	Josh Thacker	Old Dominion	Daniel Pacella	Vermont
College Soccer News	Joey Maher	Indiana	Anderson Rosa	UCF	Gabriel Alves	Marshall
College Soccer News	Finn McRobb	High Point	Thomas Beecham	California Baptist	Tommy Silva	UCLA
College Soccer News	Eoin Gawronski	Temple	Will Stack	William & Mary	Rotem Fadida	Hartford
Top Drawer Soccer	Bertin Jacquesson	Pitt	Beto Soto	Marquette	Benjamin Bender	Maryland
Top Drawer Soccer	Chris Hegardt	Georgetown	Peter Mangione	Penn State	Quin Rogers	Michigan
Top Drawer Soccer	Laurence Wootton	Ohio State	Anderson Rosa	UCF	Emmanuel Hagan	UNCG
Top Drawer Soccer	Garrison Tubbs	Wake Forest	Jony Muñoz	UMKC	Mason Leeth	Saint Louis
Top Drawer Soccer	Peter Stroud	Duke	Theo Collomb	UNCG	Alec Hughes	UMass
Top Drawer Soccer	Finn McRobb	High Point	Mark Fisher	Stanford	Antino Lopez	Duke
Top Drawer Soccer	Filip Mirkovic	Pitt	Thomas Beecham	California Baptist	Alex Rando	Virginia
Top Drawer Soccer	Alex Henderson	Georgia State	Sami Charaf Amal	Campbell	David Jackson	Navy
Top Drawer Soccer	James Lowell	Maryland	Christian Buendia	Saint Louis	Logan Farrington	Milwaukee
Top Drawer Soccer	Alex Meinhard	Tulsa	Joseph Maher	Indiana	Daniel Pacella	Vermont
Top Drawer Soccer	Maximilian Moeller	Grand Canyon	Eoin Gawronski	Temple	Jansen Miller	Xavier
