= 2020 Washington Huskies men's soccer team =

American college soccer season

2020 Washington Huskies men's soccer

Seattle Cup champions

NCAA Tournament, Quarterfinals
- Conference: Pac-12 Conference
- Record: 10–4–0 (7–3–0 Pac-12)
- Head coach: Jamie Clark (10th season)
- Associate head coach: Jeff Rowland (10th season)
- Assistant coaches: Richard Reece (16th season); Raphael Cox (2nd season)
- Home stadium: Husky Soccer Stadium

The 2020 Washington Huskies men's soccer team represented the University of Washington during the 2020 NCAA Division I men's soccer season. They were led by tenth year head coach Jamie Clark.

== Effects of the Covid-19 Pandemic ==
On August 13, 2020, the Pac-12 Conference postponed all fall sports through the end of the calendar year.

On November 4, 2020, the NCAA approved a plan for college soccer to be played in the spring.

== Player movement ==
=== 2020 MLS Draft ===
Player	Position	Round	Pick	Team	Ref.
Jaret Townsend	MF	3	58	Sporting Kansas City	

=== 2021 MLS Draft ===
Player	Position	Round	Pick	Team	Ref.
Ethan Bartlow	DF	1	6	Houston Dynamo	
Freddy Kleemann	DF	1	11	Austin FC	

=== Recruits ===
No.	Name	Pos.	Nat.	Hometown	High School	Club	MLS rights	TDS Rating

== Roster ==
Source: Note: Flags indicate national team as defined under FIFA eligibility rules; some limited exceptions apply. Players may hold more than one non-FIFA nationality.

No.	Pos.	Nation	Player
0	GK	USA	Sam Fowler
1	GK	USA	Andrew Morrison
2	DF	USA	Kendall Burks
4	DF	USA	Ryan Sailor
5	MF	USA	Euan Clark
6	MF	USA	Kalani Kossa-Rienzi
7	MF	MEX	Imanol Rosales
8	FW	USA	Gio Miglietti
9	MF	USA	Dylan Teves
10	MF	ENG	James Smith
11	FW	USA	Nick Scardina
12	FW	USA	Tyler Smith
13	MF	USA	Scott Gustafson
14	MF	USA	Christian Soto
15	DF	USA	Nate Jones

No.	Pos.	Nation	Player
16	DF	USA	Woody Manum
17	MF	USA	Michael Rojas
19	DF	USA	Cole Grimsby
20	DF	USA	Charlie Ostrem
21	FW	USA	Jayson Baca
22	MF	USA	Ryan Crowley
23	MF	USA	Gabe Threadgold
24	DF	USA	Khai Brisco
25	FW	USA	Chris Meyers
26	DF	USA	Noah Whitman
27	MF	USA	Jensen Jabara
28	MF	USA	Julian Churchill
29	DF	USA	Jack Maguire
30	GK	USA	Jacob Castro
33	MF	USA	Lucas Meek

== Matches ==
=== Regular season ===
February 4, 2021 Non-conference	Washington	6-0	Northwest University	Seattle, WA
6:00 p.m. PT	Christian Soto 21'; Kendall Burks 25'; Nick Scardina 49', 58', 61'; Gio Miglietti 70'	Report		Stadium: Husky Soccer Stadium; Attendance: 0

February 7, 2021 Non-conference	Washington	3-0	Gonzaga	Seattle, WA
2:00 p.m. PT	Imanol Rosales 7'; Lucas Meek 18', 25'	Report		Stadium: Husky Soccer Stadium; Attendance: 0

February 20, 2021 Conference	Washington	1-2	Oregon State	Seattle, WA
5:00 p.m. PT	Gio Miglietti 59'	Report	Gloire Amanda 58', 72'	Stadium: Husky Soccer Stadium; Attendance: 0

February 27, 2021 Conference	California	0-2	Washington	Berkeley, CA
1:00 p.m. PT		Report	Dylan Teves 27'; Lucas Meek 44'	Stadium: Witter Rugby Field; Attendance: 0

March 6, 2021 Conference	Washington	3-2 (a.e.t.)	San Diego State	Seattle, WA
1:00 p.m. PT	Charlie Ostrem 57'; Ryan Sailor 90'; Dylan Teves 92'	Report	Blake Bowen 38', 65'	Stadium: Husky Soccer Stadium; Attendance: 0

March 10, 2021 Seattle Cup	Washington	4-0	Seattle	Seattle, WA
6:00 p.m. PT	Dylan Teves 3', 51' (pen.); Lucas Meek 65'; Christian Soto 70'	Report		Stadium: Husky Soccer Stadium; Attendance: 0

March 14, 2021 Conference	UCLA	0-2	Washington	Los Angeles, CA
4:00 p.m. PT		Report	Ryan Sailor 31'; Christian Soto 88'	Stadium: Wallis Annenberg Stadium; Attendance: 0

March 20, 2021 Conference	Washington	1-0	Stanford	Seattle, WA
1:00 p.m. PT	Dylan Teves 85'	Report		Stadium: Husky Soccer Stadium; Attendance: 0

February 20, 2021 Conference	Oregon State	1-2	Washington	Corvallis, OR
5:00 p.m. PT	Mouhameth Thiam 27'	Report	Ryan Sailor 11'; Gio Miglietti 21'	Stadium: Lorenz Field; Attendance: 40

March 28, 2021 Conference	San Diego State	2-0	Washington	San Diego, CA
3:30 p.m. PT	Tristan Weber 25'; Austin Wehner 37'	Report		Stadium: SDSU Sports Deck; Attendance: 0

April 3, 2021 Conference	Washington	2-1	California	Seattle, WA
1:00 p.m. PT	Dylan Teves 24' (pen.); Lucas Meek 59'	Report	Alonzo Del Mundo 14'	Stadium: Husky Soccer Stadium; Attendance: 0

April 8, 2021 Conference	Washington	5-1	UCLA	Seattle, WA
4:00 p.m. PT	Kendall Burks 13', 16'; Nick Scardina 20', 77'; Dylan Teves 26'	Report	Riley Ferch 69'	Stadium: Husky Soccer Stadium; Attendance: 0

April 17, 2021 Conference	Stanford	1-0 (a.e.t.)	Washington	Stanford, CA
12:30 p.m. PT	Zach Ryan 97'	Report		Stadium: Cagan Stadium; Attendance: 136

=== Postseason ===
==== NCAA Tournament ====
May 2, 2021 Second round	Washington	2-0	Grand Canyon	Matthews, North Carolina
1:00 p.m. PT	Ryan Sailor 21'; Christian Soto 55'	Report		Stadium: Matthews Sportsplex; Attendance: 54

May 6, 2021 Third round	Washington	2-0	Missouri State	Cary, North Carolina
9:00 a.m. PT	Lucas Meek 64'; Nick Scardina 78'	Report		Stadium: WakeMed Soccer Park; Attendance: 150

May 10, 2021 Quarterfinals	Pittsburgh	3-0	Washington	Cary, North Carolina
10:00 a.m. PT	Valentin Noel 52'; Bertin Jacquesson 88'; Veljko Petkovic 89'	Report		Stadium: WakeMed Soccer Park; Attendance: 74
