= 2021 Big Ten men's soccer tournament =

- Classification: Division I
- Teams: 8
- Matches: 7
- Attendance: 7,695
- First round site: Top Seed Campus Site
- Quarterfinals site: Higher seeds
- Semifinals site: Higher seeds
- Finals site: Jeffrey Field; State College, Pennsylvania
- Champions: Penn State (4th title)
- Winning coach: Jeff Cook (1st title)
- MVP: Seth Kuhn (Offensive); Kris Shakes (Defensive) (Penn State)
- Broadcast: BTN

2021 Big Ten Conference men's soccer standings
	Conf.					Overall
Team	W		L		T	W		L		T
No. 24 Penn State ‡	6	–	2	–	0	13	–	7	–	1
No. 23 Maryland +	5	–	2	–	1	12	–	4	–	2
No. 14 Indiana +	5	–	3	–	0	15	–	6	–	1
Michigan	4	–	3	–	1	8	–	7	–	3
Rutgers	3	–	4	–	1	9	–	6	–	2
Wisconsin	3	–	4	–	1	7	–	7	–	3
Northwestern	3	–	5	–	0	6	–	8	–	2
Michigan State	2	–	4	–	2	6	–	8	–	2
Ohio State	2	–	6	–	0	6	–	9	–	1
‡ – 2021 B1G Tournament champion + – At-large invitation to the 2021 NCAA Tournament; As of December 14, 2021; Rankings from United Soccer Coaches; Source: Big Ten

The 2021 Big Ten men's soccer tournament was the 31st edition of the tournament. As the tournament champion, Penn State earned the Big Ten Conference's automatic berth into the 2021 NCAA Division I men's soccer tournament.

== Seeding ==
Seeding was determined by regular season conference record points per game.

Seed	School	Conference	Tiebreaker
1	Penn State	6–2–0	
2	Maryland	5–2–1	
3	Indiana	5–3–0	
4	Michigan	4–3–1	
5	Wisconsin	3–4–1	W 2–0 vs. Rutgers
6	Rutgers	3–4–1	L 0–2 vs. Wisconsin
7	Northwestern	3–5–0	
8	Michigan State	2–4–2	

== Bracket ==
Quarterfinals; November 7
1	Penn State	2
8	Michigan State	0
4	Michigan	2
5	Wisconsin	1
3	Indiana	1
6	Rutgers	0
2	Maryland	0 (2)
7	Northwestern (pen.)	0 (3)

Semifinals; November 10
1	Penn State	2
4	Michigan	0
3	Indiana (a.e.t.)	1
7	Northwestern	0

Championship; November 14
1	Penn State	3
3	Indiana	0

== Schedule ==
=== Quarterfinals ===
November 7, 2021	#4 Michigan	2–1	#5 Rutgers	Ann Arbor, MI
1:00 p.m.	Brennan Callow (yellow card) 34'; Ryan Schultz 64'; Evan Rasmussen (yellow card) 72'; Uriel Zeitz 75'; Jason Bucknor (yellow card) 90'	Report	(yellow card) 10', (goal) 50' Tim Bielic; (yellow card) 27' Ignasi Marques	Stadium: U-M Soccer Stadium; Attendance: 1,136; Referee: Cesar Ibarra; Assistant referees: Ethan Buege; Quinton McFarlen; Fourth official: Noah Hartman

November 7, 2021	#3 Indiana	1–0	#6 Rutgers	Bloomington, IN
1:00 p.m.	Samuel Sarver 27'	Report		Stadium: Bill Armstrong Stadium; Attendance: 1,200; Referee: Calin Radosav; Assistant referees: Art Arustamyan; Zachary Richter; Fourth official: Michael Crump

November 7, 2021	#2 Maryland	0–0 (a.e.t.) (2–3 p)	#7 Northwestern	College Park, MD
1:00 p.m.		Report	(yellow card) 19' Miha Miskovic	Stadium: Ludwig Field; Attendance: 1,319; Referee: Nicholas Balcer; Assistant referees: Steve Besk; Justin Tatsak; Fourth official: Jordan Gray
	Penalties
	Justin Gielen (penalty missed); Ben Bender (penalty scored); Caden Stafford (penalty scored); Brett St. Martin (penalty missed); Brayan Padilla (penalty missed)		Justin Weiss (penalty missed); Vicente Castro (penalty missed); Spencer Farina (penalty scored); Richie Bennett (penalty scored); Rom Brown (penalty scored)

November 7, 2021	#1 Penn State	2–0	#8 Michigan State	University Park, PA
4:00 p.m.	Peter Mangione 1'; Andrew Privett 17'; Liam Butts (yellow card) 23'; Keegan Ness (yellow card) 56'; Seth Kuhn (yellow card) 70'	Report	(yellow card) 25' Zach Babiak; (yellow card) 43' Gianni Ferri	Stadium: Jeffrey Field; Attendance: 1,264; Referee: Sergio Gonzalez; Assistant referees: Max Campbell; Michael Gorsegner; Fourth official: Terrence Mull

=== Semifinals ===
November 12, 2021	#1 Penn State	2–0	#4 Michigan	University Park, PA
Noon	Seth Kuhn 12'; Andrew Privett 24'; Kyle May (yellow card) 65'; Dax Hoffman (yellow card) 74'	Report	(yellow card) 12' Joel Harrison; (yellow card) 61' Evan Rasmussen	Stadium: Jeffrey Field; Attendance: 523; Referee: Mike Stutt; Assistant referees: Michael Gorsegner; Max Campbell; Fourth official: Sergio Gonzalez

November 12, 2021	#3 Indiana	1–0 (a.e.t.)	#7 Northwestern	Bloomington, IN
2:00 p.m.	Joey Maher (yellow card) 58', 98'	Report	(yellow card) 90' Spencer Farina	Stadium: Bill Armstrong Stadium; Attendance: 564; Referee: Nikola Aleksic; Assistant referees: Sean West; Zachary Richter; Fourth official: William DeLois

=== Final ===
November 14, 2021	#1 Penn State	3–0	#3 Indiana	University Park, PA
Noon	Seth Khun 36'; Tyger Evans 56'; Pierre Reedy 85'	Report		Stadium: Jeffrey Field; Attendance: 1,689; Referee: Sorin Stoica; Assistant referees: Vicente Suarez; Brad Snow; Fourth official: Ryan Slack

== Statistics ==
=== Goalscorers ===
There have been 12 goals scored in 7 matches, for an average of 1.71 goals per match (as of November 14, 2021).

2 goals

- Seth Kuhn – Penn State
- Andrew Privett – Penn State

1 goal

- Joey Maher – Indiana
- Samuel Sarver – Indiana
- Ryan Schultz – Michigan
- Uriel Zeitz – Michigan
- Tyger Evans – Penn State
- Peter Mangione – Penn State
- Pierre Reedy – Penn State
- Tim Bielic – Rutgers

== All-Tournament team ==
Player	Team
Roman Celentano	Indiana
Spencer Glass	Indiana
Nick Richardson	Maryland
Marc Ybarra	Michigan
Michael Miller	Michigan State
Miha Miskovic	Northwestern
Seth Kuhn*	Penn State
Peter Mangione	Penn State
Kris Shakes^	Penn State
Thomas DeVizio	Rutgers
Tim Bielic	Wisconsin

* Offensive MVP
^ Defensive MVP
