= Pierre Reedy =

American soccer player (born 1998)

Personal information
- Date of birth: January 11, 1998 (age 28)
- Place of birth: Kutztown, Pennsylvania, United States
- Height: 1.83 m (6 ft 0 in)
- Positions: Midfielder; full-back

Youth career
- 2011–2015: Lehigh Valley United
- 2015–2016: New York Red Bulls

College career
Years	Team	Apps	(Gls)
2016–2021	Penn State Nittany Lions	69	(9)

Senior career*
Years	Team	Apps	(Gls)
2016–2018	Reading United	9	(0)
2022	Real Monarchs	18	(0)
2022	→ Real Salt Lake (loan)	1	(0)
2023	Dundee	4	(0)
2023	Charleston Battery	13	(0)
2024–2025	Spokane Velocity	27	(3)
2026	Sacramento Republic	0	(0)
Total		72	(3)
- * Club domestic league appearances and goals

Pierre Reedy (born January 11, 1998) is an American former professional soccer player who played either as a midfielder or full-back.

Reedy started his career in high school alongside with youth clubs such as Lehigh Valley United and the New York Red Bulls Academy. He played college soccer with Penn State Nittany Lions men's soccer while also playing for USL PDL side Reading United before going pro in 2022. Reedy's first professional games were with MLS Next Pro side Real Monarchs, and he would make two appearances with their MLS affiliates Real Salt Lake. After a season in Utah, Reedy headed over to Scotland where he joined Scottish Championship club Dundee, and won the title to earn promotion. Returning to America, Reedy played for the Charleston Battery, Spokane Velocity and Sacramento Republic before retiring in 2026 due to long-term injury complications sustained during his college career.

== Career ==
=== Youth and college ===
Reedy began his career playing for his Kutztown Area High School soccer team as well as with Lehigh Valley United youths, and won District and State championships with both sides respectively. In 2015, Reedy would leave his high school team to join the New York Red Bulls Academy and committed to Penn State University. After joining the Penn State Nittany Lions men's soccer as a walk-on in 2016, Reedy would play every game in his freshman season and was named to the Big Ten Conference All-Freshman Team at season's end. He would redshirt the following two seasons due to injury after suffering two ACL tears.

Upon returning to play for the Nittany Lions in 2019, Reedy would co-captain the side for the next three seasons. At the end of the COVID-19-extended 2020 season, Reedy was named to the All-American Third Teams by Soccer America and United Soccer Coaches, as well as All-Big Ten First Team. After narrowly losing out on winning the Big Ten tournament in 2020, Penn State would win both the 2021 Big Ten regular season and the 2021 Big Ten men's soccer tournament, with Reedy scoring in the 3–0 victory over the Indiana Hoosiers. Reedy would be named to the All-Big Ten Second Team at the end of his final collegiate season, and would also be award the prestigious Big Ten Medal of Honor.

While at Penn State, Reedy would also play for USL Premier Development League club Reading United AC for three seasons, reaching the National Championship final in 2018.

=== Real Monarchs and Real Salt Lake ===
On February 25, 2022, After going undrafted in the 2022 MLS SuperDraft, Reedy signed an MLS Next Pro contract with Real Monarchs, the affiliate of Major League Soccer club Real Salt Lake, after a successful trial period. On March 31, 2022, Reedy was called up to Real Salt Lake via the 'extreme hardship' rule. He made his MLS debut on April 3 in a 1–1 draw away to Rocky Mountain Cup rivals Colorado Rapids. He would make his first start for Real Salt Lake on April 21 in a U.S. Open Cup match against Northern Colorado Hailstorm. After returning to Real Monarchs in May, Reedy played the remainder of the season with them, making 18 appearances in total, before departing the club at the end of the season.

=== Dundee ===
In March 2023, after a successful trial period, Reedy earned a short-term contract with Scottish Championship club Dundee until the end of the season, subject to international clearance. Dundee officially announced his signing on April 8, 2023, and he made his debut later that day as a substitute in a draw away to Arbroath. After making 4 appearances for the club, Reedy would win the Scottish Championship with Dundee at the end of the season. Reedy would leave the club upon the expiration of his contract in July.

=== Charleston Battery ===
On 14 July 2023, Reedy joined USL Championship club Charleston Battery. He made his debut for the club the following day off the bench in a league match against Miami FC. He left Charleston following the 2023 season.

=== Spokane Velocity ===
On 26 January 2024, Reedy joined the USL League One club Spokane Velocity for its inaugural season. He made his debut in the club's first competitive match on 9 March in League One against Greenville Triumph. Reedy scored his first goal for the Velocity in a USL Cup game against Central Valley Fuego, for which he won Goal of the Round for.

=== Sacramento Republic and retirement ===
On 17 December 2025, Reedy joined USL Championship club Sacramento Republic. Reedy played his first game for the club on 6 June 2026, coming on as a substitute in a USL Cup group match against Monterey Bay. On 29 June 2026, Reedy announced that he had retired from professional soccer at the age of 28 due to struggles caused by his previous injuries, particular his two ACL tears while at Penn State.

== Personal life ==
During his studies at Pennsylvania State University, Reedy graduated with a degree in security and risk analysis before earning a master's degree in corporate finance. Reedy's personal interests include golf, hiking and listening to EDM. He at one point had a clothing brand, PR42, for which proceeds would go back into the local community.

== Career statistics ==
As of June 6, 2026

Appearances and goals by club, season and competition
Club	Season	League			National cup		League cup		Other		Total	
Club	Season	Division	Apps	Goals	Apps	Goals	Apps	Goals	Apps	Goals	Apps	Goals
Reading United	2016	Premier Development League	2	0	0	0	—		2 (Note: Appearance(s) in PDL Playoffs)	1	4	1
Reading United	2017	Premier Development League	2	0	0	0	—		0	0	2	0
Reading United	2018	Premier Development League	5	0	0	0	—		4	0	9	0
Reading United	Total		9	0	0	0	0	0	6	1	15	1
Real Monarchs	2022	MLS Next Pro	18	0	—		—		0	0	18	0
Real Salt Lake (loan)	2022	Major League Soccer	1	0	1	0	—		0	0	2	0
Dundee	2022–23	Scottish Championship	4	0	—		—		0	0	4	0
Charleston Battery	2023	USL Championship	13	0	—		—		0	0	13	0
Spokane Velocity	2024	USL League One	7	0	3	0	3	1	0	0	13	1
Spokane Velocity	2025	USL League One	20	3	1	0	2	0	0	0	23	3
Spokane Velocity	Total		27	3	4	0	5	1	0	0	36	4
Sacramento Republic	2026	USL Championship	0	0	0	0	1	0	0	0	1	0
Career total			72	3	5	0	6	1	6	1	89	5

== Honors ==
Penn State Nittany Lions men's soccer

- Big Ten Conference regular season: 2021
- Big Ten men's soccer tournament: 2021

Dundee

- Scottish Championship: 2022–23

Charleston Battery

- Eastern Conference Champion (Playoffs): 2023
