= Tommy Silva =

American soccer player (born 2002)

Personal information
- Full name: Derrick Nicholas Silva
- Date of birth: February 21, 2002 (age 24)
- Place of birth: Tucson, Arizona, United States
- Height: 5 ft 10 in (1.78 m)
- Position: Left back

Team information
- Current team: Detroit City
- Number: 33

Youth career
- 2016–2020: Real Salt Lake

College career
Years	Team	Apps	(Gls)
2020–2023	UCLA Bruins	69	(9)

Senior career*
Years	Team	Apps	(Gls)
2020	FC Tucson	9	(0)
2024–2025	Real Salt Lake	1	(0)
2024–2025	→ Real Monarchs	24	(1)
2026–	Detroit City	23	(1)
- * Club domestic league appearances and goals as of November 4, 2026

Derrick "Tommy" Nicolas Silva (born February 21, 2002) is an American soccer player who currently plays for Detroit City FC.

== Playing career ==
=== Youth ===
Silva was a member of the Real Salt Lake at both their Arizona and Utah academies.

=== FC Tucson ===
On July 22, 2020, Silva signed a USL academy contract with USL League One side FC Tucson. He made his debut on August 8, 2020, appearing as an 89th-minute substitute during a 2–1 loss to Union Omaha.

=== UCLA ===
Silva committed to play college soccer at UCLA in the fall of 2020. Due to the COVID-19 pandemic, the season was delayed to spring 2021. Silva made his collegiate debut on February 8, 2021, in a 3–0 win against University of San Francisco. Silva started and played the entire match and had one assist. On March 24, 2021, Silva scored his first collegiate goal, in a 2–2 draw at San Diego State University. Silva finished the season with 12 appearances for the Bruins, and two goals. Following the 2020 NCAA Division I men's soccer season and 2020 Pac-12 Conference men's soccer season, he was named a third-team Freshman All-American by College Soccer News.

During his sophomore campaign, he so far has experienced a breakout season, scoring three goals in the program's first five matches.

=== Real Salt Lake ===
On January 4, 2024, Silva signed a homegrown player deal with Major League Soccer side Real Salt Lake.

=== Detroit City FC ===
On January 22, 2026, it was announced that Silva joined Detroit City FC in the USL Championship on a two year contract.
