= Sun Belt Conference Men's Soccer Player of the Year =

Sun Belt Men's Soccer Player of the Year
- Awarded for: the most outstanding male soccer player in the Sun Belt Conference
- Country: United States
- First award: 1990
- Currently held by: Drew Hansen, UCF

Sun Belt Men's Offensive Soccer Player of the Year
- Awarded for: the most outstanding offensive male soccer player in the Sun Belt Conference
- Country: United States
- First award: 2014
- Currently held by: Broden Beorlegui, Georgia Southern

Sun Belt Men's Defensive Soccer Player of the Year
- Awarded for: the most outstanding defensive male soccer player in the Sun Belt Conference
- Country: United States
- First award: 2014
- Currently held by: Mika Habel, South Carolina

Sun Belt Men's Goalkeeper Soccer Player of the Year
- Awarded for: the most outstanding goalkeeper male soccer player in the Sun Belt Conference
- Country: United States
- First award: 2023
- Currently held by: Toby Mawer, West Virginia

The Sun Belt Conference Men's Soccer Player of the Year is an annual award given to the best attacking player in the Sun Belt Conference during the NCAA Division I men's soccer season. In addition to the Player of the Year award, the Sun Belt also awards Offensive Player of the Year, Defensive Player of the Year, and Goalkeeper of the Year.

== Key ==
†	Co-Players of the Year
*	Awarded a national Player of the Year award: Hermann Trophy
Player (X)	Denotes the number of times the player had been awarded the SBC Player of the Year award at that point

== Winners ==
=== Player of the Year (1990–) ===
Season	Player	School	Position	Reference
1990	Gabe Garcia	Charlotte	Forward	
1991	Stephen Small	South Alabama		
1992	Stephen Small (2)	South Alabama		
1993	Shaun Rothuysen	South Alabama		
1994	Dale Edwards	South Alabama		
1995	Dale Edwards†	South Alabama		
1995	Bryan Wilkinson†	Jacksonville		
1996	Tony Kuhn	Vanderbilt	Forward	
2016	Hannes Burmeister	Georgia State	Midfielder	
2017	Frantzdy Pierrot	Coastal Carolina	Forward	
2018	Jake Chasteen†	App State	Goalkeeper	
2018	Javier Carbonell†	Georgia Southern	Forward	
2019	Niklas Brodacki	UCA	Forward	
2020	George Proctor	Georgia State	Defender	
2022	Milo Yosef	Marshall	Forward	
2023	Matthew Bell	Marshall	Forward	
2024	Sergio Ors Navarro	West Virginia	Forward	
2025	Marcus Caldeira	West Virginia	Forward	
2026	Drew Hansen	UCF	Forward	

=== Offensive Player of the Year (2014–) ===
Season	Player	School	Reference
2014	Christian Marcel	NJIT	
2015	Jamie O'Grady	Hartwick	
2016	Hannes Burmeister	Georgia State	
2017	Jamie O'Grady	Hartwick	
2018	Yazeed Matthews†	Coastal Carolina	
2018	Javier Carbonell†	Georgia Southern	
2019	Aris Briggs	Georgia State	
2020	Aris Briggs (2)	Georgia State	
2022	Milo Yosef	Marshall	
2023	Matthew Bell	Marshall	
2024	Sergio Ors Navarro	West Virginia	
2025	Marcus Caldeira	West Virginia	
2026	Broden Beorlegui	Georgia Southern	

=== Defensive Player of the Year (2014–) ===
Season	Player	School	Reference
2014	Marko Drljic	NJIT	
2015	Kit Tregear	Hartwick	
2016	Emil Lauresen	Georgia Southern	
2017	Kyle Clinton	Georgia State	
2018	Kyle Clinton (2)	Georgia State	
2019	Zeiko Harris	App State	
2020	George Proctor	Georgia State	
2022	Luis Grassow	Kentucky	
2023	Morris Duggan	Marshall	
2024	Luca Nikolai	James Madison	
2025	Noah Holmstrom	Georgia Southern	
2026	Mika Habel	South Carolina	

=== Goalkeeper of the Year (2022–) ===
Season	Player	School	Reference
2022	Casper Mols	Kentucky	
2023	Gabriel Perrotta	Marshall	
2024	Sebastian Conlon	James Madison	
2025	Sebastian Conlon (2)	Kentucky	
2026	Toby Mawer	West Virginia	
