= Pearse O'Brien =

Irish footballer

Personal information
- Date of birth: 26 October 2004 (age 22)
- Place of birth: West Hartford, Connecticut, United States
- Position: Midfielder

Team information
- Current team: Providence Friars
- Number: 19

Youth career
- 2006–2020: Oakwood SC
- 2020–2021: Real Salt Lake

College career
Years	Team	Apps	(Gls)
2023–	Providence Friars	17	(3)

Senior career*
Years	Team	Apps	(Gls)
2021	Real Monarchs	2	(0)
2022–2023	Hartford Athletic	1	(0)

International career^{‡}
2020	Republic of Ireland U15	1	(0)
- * Club domestic league appearances and goals as of 10:05, 14 October 2022 (UTC) ‡ National team caps and goals as of 00:42, 21 March 2022 (UTC)

Pearse O'Brien (born 26 October 2004) is a professional footballer who plays as a midfielder for Providence College. Born in the United States, he represented Ireland at youth level.

== Club career ==
Born in West Hartford, Connecticut, O'Brien began his career with U.S. Soccer Development Academy side Oakwood Soccer Club in 2016. While training with the Ireland youth sides, O'Brien attracted interest from both Scottish club Celtic and English club Fulham. After rising the ranks at Oakwood, O'Brien decided to join the youth setup at Major League Soccer club Real Salt Lake, joining the club's under-19 side.

On 15 May 2021, O'Brien made his professional debut for Real Salt Lake's USL Championship affiliate Real Monarchs against LA Galaxy II, coming on as a 69th-minute substitute during the 2–0 defeat.

In February 2022, O'Brien joined Hartford Athletic on an academy contract.

== International career ==
O'Brien is eligible to represent the United States and the Republic of Ireland, through birth and heritage, respectively. On 18 January 2020, O'Brien made his debut for the Republic of Ireland under-15 against the Australia under-17s.

== Career statistics ==
As of match played 26 May 2021

Appearances and goals by club, season and competition
Club	Season	League			National Cup		Continental		Total	
Club	Season	Division	Apps	Goals	Apps	Goals	Apps	Goals	Apps	Goals
Real Monarchs	2021	USL Championship	2	0	—		—		2	0
Career total			2	0	0	0	0	0	2	0
