= 2020 Pac-12 Conference men's soccer season =

- League: NCAA Division I
- Sport: Soccer
- Duration: February 3, 2021 – April 17, 2021
- Teams: 6
- Total attendance: 180 (many closed door matches)

2021 MLS SuperDraft
- Top draft pick: Ethan Bartlow
- Picked by: Houston Dynamo

Regular Season

Pac-12 Conference men's soccer seasons
- ← 2019 2021 →

2020 Pac-12 Conference men's soccer standings
	Conf.					Overall
Team	W		L		T	W		L		T
No. 10 Stanford †	7	–	2	–	1	10	–	3	–	1
No. 8 Washington +	7	–	3	–	0	12	–	4	–	0
No. 18 Oregon State +	6	–	4	–	0	9	–	5	–	0
California	4	–	5	–	1	4	–	5	–	1
UCLA	2	–	6	–	2	3	–	7	–	2
San Diego State	1	–	7	–	2	1	–	7	–	2
† – Conference champion on points per game + – Also invited to the 2020 NCAA tournament; As of May 28, 2021; Rankings from United Soccer Coaches

The 2020 Pac-12 Conference men's soccer season is the 21st season of men's varsity soccer in the conference. The season began on February 3, 2021, and will end on April 17.

== Effects of the Covid-19 pandemic ==
The season was set to begin in August 2020 and conclude in November 2020. Due to the COVID-19 pandemic, the Pac-12 Conference postponed sports through the end of the calendar year.

On September 22, 2020, the NCAA approved a plan to play the fall championships in the spring.

== Teams ==
=== Stadiums and Locations ===
Team	Location	Stadium	Capacity
California Golden Bears	Berkeley, California	Edwards Stadium	22,000
California Golden Bears	Berkeley, California	Witter Rugby Field	5,000
Oregon State Beavers	Corvallis, Oregon	Lorenz Field	2,200
San Diego State Aztecs	San Diego, California	SDSU Sports Deck	3,000
Stanford Cardinal	Stanford, California	Cagan Stadium	4,000
UCLA Bruins	Los Angeles, California	Wallis Annenberg Stadium	3,000
Washington Huskies	Seattle, Washington	Husky Soccer Stadium	1,640
Washington Huskies	Seattle, Washington	Husky Stadium	70,083

== Matches ==
Index to colors and formatting
Pac-12 member won
Pac-12 member lost
Pac-12 member tied

=== Non-conference ===
Date	Time (EST)	Visiting team	Home team	Site	Result	Attendance
February 3	5:00 p.m.	Eastern Oregon	Oregon State	Lorenz Field	W 6–0	0
February 4	7:00 p.m.	Northwest University	Washington	Husky Stadium	W 6–0	0
February 7	4:00 p.m.	Gonzaga	Washington	Husky Soccer Stadium	W 3–0	0
February 8	5:00 p.m.	San Francisco	UCLA	Wallis Annenberg Stadium	W 3–0	0
February 11	4:00 p.m.	Washington	Seattle Pacific	Interbay Stadium	Cancelled	
February 12	3:00 p.m.	UCLA	Loyola Marymount	Sullivan Field	L 0–1	0
February 14	4:00 p.m.	Washington	Portland	Merlo Field	Cancelled	
March 3	4:00 p.m.	Seattle	Oregon State	Lorenz Field	Cancelled	
March 10	9:00 p.m.	Seattle	Washington	Husky Soccer Stadium	W 4-0	0

=== Conference ===
==== Week 1 (Feb. 15 – Feb. 21) ====
Date	Time (PT)	Visiting team	Home team	Site	Result	Attendance
February 20	5:00 p.m.	Oregon State	Washington	Husky Soccer Stadium	2-1	0
February 20	6:00 p.m.	San Diego State	UCLA	Wallis Annenberg Stadium	1-1	0
February 20	6:00 p.m.	Stanford	California	Witter Rugby Field	3-1	0

==== Week 2 (Feb. 22 – Feb. 28) ====
Date	Time (PT)	Visiting team	Home team	Site	Result	Attendance
February 27	1:00 p.m.	Washington	California	Witter Rugby Field	2-0	0
February 27	1:00 p.m.	UCLA	Oregon State	Lorenz Field	1-2	0
February 27	6:00 p.m.	Stanford	San Diego State	SDSU Sports Deck	1-0	0

==== Week 3 (Mar. 1 – Mar. 7) ====
Date	Time (PT)	Visiting team	Home team	Site	Result	Attendance
March 6	TBD	San Diego State	Washington	Husky Soccer Stadium	2-3	0
March 6	2:00 p.m.	UCLA	Stanford	Cagan Stadium	0-4	0
March 6	6:00 p.m.	California	Oregon State	Lorenz Field	0-4	0

==== Week 4 (Mar. 8 – Mar. 14) ====
Date	Time (PT)	Visiting team	Home team	Site	Result	Attendance
March 13	1:00 p.m.	California	San Diego State	SDSU Sports Deck	3-2	0
March 13	3:00 p.m.	Oregon State	Stanford	Cagan Stadium	2-3	0
March 14	4:00 p.m.	Washington	UCLA	Wallis Annenberg Stadium	2-0	0

==== Week 5 (Mar. 15 – Mar. 21) ====
Date	Time (PT)	Visiting team	Home team	Site	Result	Attendance
March 20	12:30 p.m.	San Diego State	Oregon State	Lorenz Field	0-5	40
March 20	1:00 p.m.	Stanford	Washington	Husky Soccer Stadium	0-1	0
March 20	1:00 p.m.	UCLA	California	Witter Rugby Field	0-2	0

==== Week 6 (Mar. 22 – Mar. 28) ====
Date	Time (PT)	Visiting team	Home team	Site	Result	Attendance
March 24	4:00 p.m.	Washington	Oregon State	Lorenz Field	2-1	40
March 24	6:00 p.m.	UCLA	San Diego State	SDSU Sports Deck	2-2	0
March 24	7:00 p.m.	California	Stanford	Cagan Stadium	0-0	0
March 28	2:00 p.m.	Stanford	UCLA	Wallis Annenberg Stadium	3-0	0
March 28	3:30 p.m.	Washington	San Diego State	SDSU Sports Deck	0-2	0
March 28	7:00 p.m.	Oregon State	California	Witter Rugby Field	0-1	0

==== Week 7 (Mar. 29 – Apr. 4) ====
Date	Time (PT)	Visiting team	Home team	Site	Result	Attendance
April 3	1:00 p.m.	California	Washington	Husky Soccer Stadium	1-2	0
April 3	3:00 p.m.	San Diego State	Stanford	Cagan Stadium	1-3	100
April 3	5:00 p.m.	Oregon State	UCLA	Wallis Annenberg Stadium	1-2	0

==== Week 8 (Apr. 5 – Apr. 11) ====
Date	Time (PT)	Visiting team	Home team	Site	Result	Attendance
April 8	4:00 p.m.	UCLA	Washington	Husky Soccer Stadium		
April 10	12:00 p.m.	Stanford	Oregon State	Lorenz Field		
April 10	7:00 p.m.	San Diego State	California	Witter Rugby Field		

==== Week 9 (Apr. 12 – Apr. 18) ====
Date	Time (PT)	Visiting team	Home team	Site	Result	Attendance
April 17	12:30 p.m.	Washington	Stanford	Cagan Stadium		
April 17	2:00 p.m.	Oregon State	San Diego State	SDSU Sports Deck		
April 17	2:30 p.m.	California	UCLA	Wallis Annenberg Stadium		
