= Dylan Teves =

American soccer player

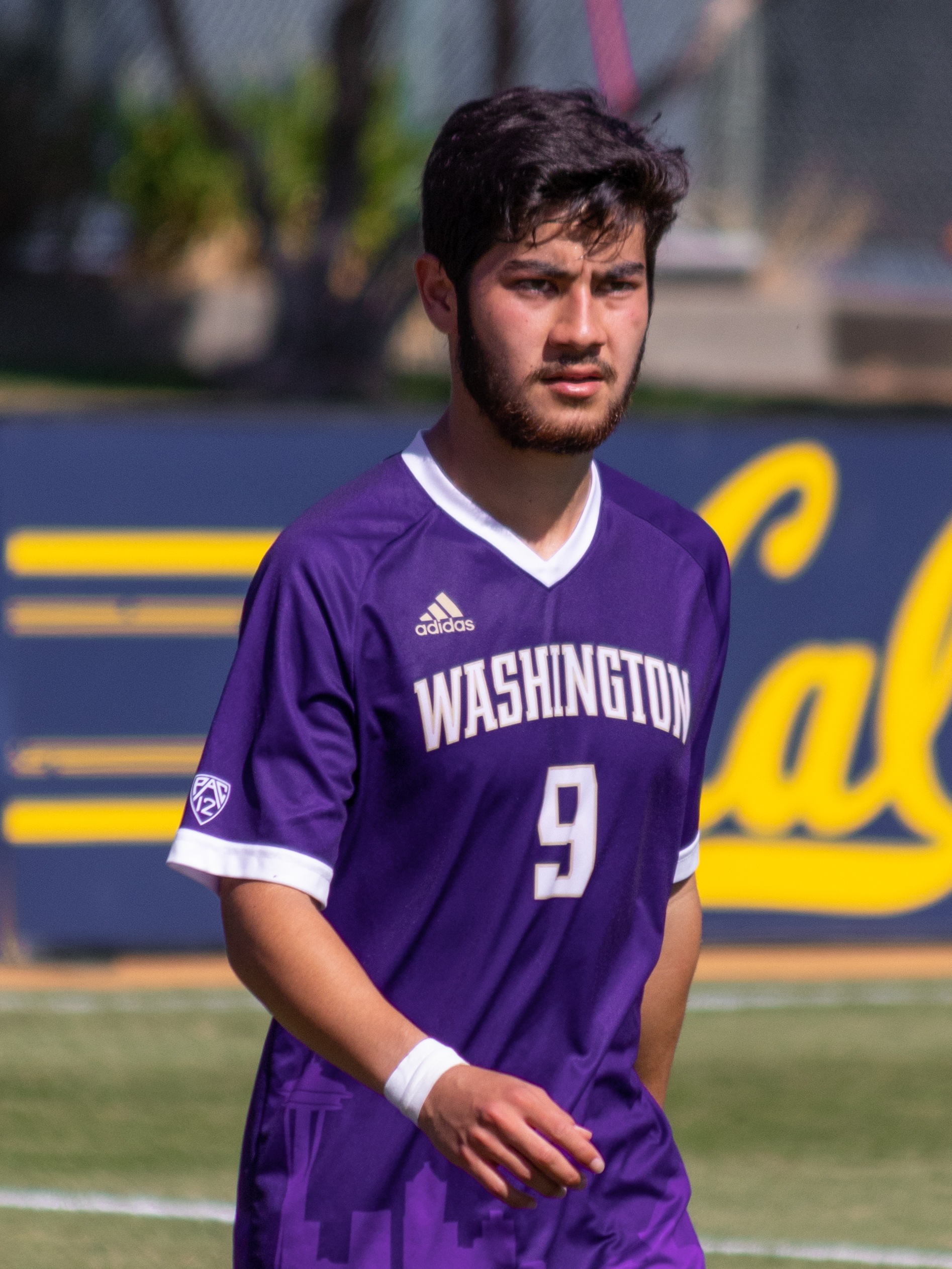
- Teves in 2021

Personal information
- Full name: Dylan Harvey Aluli Teves
- Date of birth: May 14, 2000 (age 26)
- Place of birth: Honolulu, Hawaii, United States
- Height: 5 ft 8 in (1.73 m)
- Position: Midfielder

Youth career
- 2015–2018: Seattle Sounders FC

College career
Years	Team	Apps	(Gls)
2018–2021	Washington Huskies	45	(13)

Senior career*
Years	Team	Apps	(Gls)
2017–2018	Seattle Sounders FC 2	12	(0)
2019	Seattle Sounders FC U-23	3	(0)
2022–2024	Seattle Sounders FC	25	(2)
2022–2024	→ Tacoma Defiance	29	(11)
2025	Washington AC	0	(0)
- * Club domestic league appearances and goals as of December 27, 2024

Dylan Harvey Aluli Teves (born May 14, 2000) is an American professional soccer player who last played as a midfielder for Seattle Sounders FC in Major League Soccer.

== Career ==
Teves was part of the Seattle Sounders FC academy, and appeared for their USL affiliate side Seattle Sounders FC 2 during their 2017 and 2018 seasons.

=== College ===
Teves joined the college soccer program at the University of Washington later in 2018. While a freshman at Washington, Teves began a regular starter for the Huskies halfway through the 2018 NCAA Division I men's soccer season. Teves scored his first goal for Washington on August 30, 2018, in a 2–3 loss to the Denver Pioneers. At the end of the 2018 Pac-12 Conference men's soccer season, Teves was named third-team All-Pac-12.

During Teves' junior season, he was named an All-American by United Soccer Coaches, and was one of five players in the nation to be named a consensus All-American.

=== Professional ===
On January 11, 2022, Teves signed a contract with the Sounders as a Homegrown Player. His contract option for the 2025 season was declined by the Sounders on December 4, 2024.
