= Zach Ryan =

American soccer player (born 1999)

Personal information
- Full name: Zachary Thomas Ryan
- Date of birth: January 14, 1999 (age 27)
- Place of birth: Chatham Borough, New Jersey, U.S.
- Height: 6 ft 1 in (1.85 m)
- Position: Forward

Youth career
- 2013–2017: New York Red Bulls

College career
Years	Team	Apps	(Gls)
2017–2021	Stanford Cardinal	73	(31)

Senior career*
Years	Team	Apps	(Gls)
2019	San Francisco Glens	3	(3)
2022	New York Red Bulls	6	(0)
2022	→ New York Red Bulls II (loan)	12	(1)
2023–2025	Loudoun United	89	(25)
- * Club domestic league appearances and goals as of October 25, 2025

Zachary Thomas Ryan (born January 14, 1999) is an American former professional soccer player.

== Club career ==
In 2019, Ryan originally signed with the San Francisco Glens in USL League Two, scoring three goals in three games before returning to Stanford University after the season.

On January 20, 2022, Ryan was signed to a one-year MLS Homegrown contract with the New York Red Bulls. He made his MLS debut on March 5, 2022, in a 4–1 win against Toronto FC after coming on as a substitute in the 90th minute. On May 10, 2022, Ryan scored his first goal as a professional, helping New York to a 3–0 victory over DC United as they advanced to Round of 16 in the 2022 U.S. Open Cup. Following the 2022 season, his contract option was declined by New York.

On January 14, 2023, Ryan joined USL Championship side Loudoun United.

== International career ==
In August 2013, Ryan participated in a U.S. U-14 National Team training camp in Pasadena, California.

== Personal life ==
Ryan was born in Chatham Borough, New Jersey, to Melissa and Frank Ryan. His father was a wrestler for Syracuse University and his uncle, Tom Ryan, is the head wrestling coach at Ohio State University. He has two younger brothers, Sean and Will. His brother, Sean, plays soccer at Ohio State University. Ryan attended Chatham High School, graduating in 2017.

== Honors ==
Stanford Cardinal

- NCAA Division I Men's Soccer Championship: 2017
- Pac-12 Conference: 2017, 2018, 2020

Individual

- MAC Hermann Trophy Semifinalist: 2020
- Pac-12 Player of the Year: 2020
- United Soccer Coaches ALl-America First Team: 2020
- Top Drawer Soccer Bext XI Third Team: 2020
- College Soccer News All-America First Team: 2020
- United Soccer Coaches All-Far West Region: 2020, 2021
- All-Pac-12: 2018, 2019, 2020, 2021
- Top Drawer Soccer National Team of the Week: April 20, 2021
- College Soccer News National Team of the Week: September 16, 2019; March 14, 2021
- Pac-12 Player of the Week: February 23, 2021; April 20, 2021
- College Soccer News All-Freshman First Team: 2018
- Top Drawer Soccer Best XI Freshman Second Team: 2018
- United Soccer Coaches Scholar All-America First Team: 2020
- CoSIDA Academic All-America First Team: 2020, 2021
- United Soccer Coaches Scholar All-Region: 2020, 2021
- CoSIDA Academic All-District First Team: 2019, 2020, 2021
- Pac-12 Academic Honor Roll: 2019, 2020
- Pac-12 All-Academic Second Team: 2018
