= Gloire Amanda =

Canadian soccer player

Personal information
- Date of birth: November 11, 1998 (age 28)
- Place of birth: Nyarugusu, Tanzania
- Height: 1.78 m (5 ft 10 in)
- Positions: Striker; winger

Team information
- Current team: Hougang United
- Number: 9

Youth career
- 2009–2012: Edmonton Xtreme
- 2012–2013: Edmonton Internazionale
- 2013–2014: FC Edmonton
- 2014–2017: Vancouver Whitecaps FC

College career
Years	Team	Apps	(Gls)
2018–2020	Oregon State Beavers	41	(21)

Senior career*
Years	Team	Apps	(Gls)
2017	Whitecaps FC 2	27	(3)
2017	→ Vancouver Whitecaps FC (loan)	0	(0)
2018–2019	Lane United FC	8	(2)
2021–2023	Austria Klagenfurt	10	(1)
2023	Whitecaps FC 2	24	(3)
2025	Para Hills Knights SC	17	(9)
2025	Sydney Olympic FC	6	(2)
2026–	Hougang United	0	(0)

International career
2015	Canada U18		
- * Club domestic league appearances and goals as of October 29, 2025

Gloire Amanda (born 11 November 1998) is a professional soccer player who plays primarily as a striker for Singapore Premier League club Hougang United. Primarily a striker, he can also be played as a winger. Born in Tanzania, he represented Canada at youth international level.

== Early life ==
Amanda was born in the Nyarugusu refugee camp to Congolese parents. His family moved to Edmonton, Alberta, Canada, when he was 8 years old. He played youth soccer with Edmonton Internazionale, Edmonton Extreme FC, and at St. Nicholas Soccer Academy where he played with Canada national team player Alphonso Davies. He then joined the FC Edmonton Academy for a year. He trialled with the Vancouver Whitecaps Academy in 2013, before ultimately joining them in 2014.

== College career ==
Ahead of the 2018 NCAA Division I men's soccer season, Amanda signed a National Letter of Intent to play college soccer for the Oregon State Beavers men's soccer program. In 2020, in his junior season, he led the NCAA Division I in goals (15) and total points (37), setting the OSU single-season record for points and was named to the All-Pac-12 and All-Far West Region first team, the United Soccer Coaches’ All-America first team and Top Drawer Soccer Best XI first team, and an All-American. He also was named the 2020 MAC Hermann Trophy winner as the top player in the NCAA, becoming the first Oregon State player to win the award.

== Club career ==
Amanda signed his first professional contract with Whitecaps FC 2 on March 31, 2017, having been with the Whitecaps academy since he was 15. In May 2017, Amanda was named to the Whitecaps roster for the 2017 Canadian Championship on a short-term contract, which was allowed him to play in non-MLS matches. He would spend one season with Whitecaps FC 2 before the club ceased operations after the 2017 season. Rather than sign a USL deal with the Whitecaps new affiliate, Fresno FC, Amanda would elect to evaluate playing opportunities in college.

While playing for Oregon State, Amanda would sign with Lane United FC of the Premier Development League for the 2018 season.

In June 2021, Amanda joined newly promoted Austrian Bundesliga side Austria Klagenfurt on a two-year deal. He scored his first goal on October 16, netting the equalizer against Rapid Wien in a 1-1 draw. In February 2023, he terminated his contract with the club by mutual consent.

In 2025, he played for Para Hills Knights SC in the NPL South Australia.

Amanda signed with Sydney Olympic for the 2025 Australian Championship on September 24, 2025.

== International career ==
In 2015, he was called up to the Canadian under-18 team for the Slovakia Cup. He debuted in the first match of the tournament against Slovakia U18.

== Personal life ==
His younger brother, Prince, is also a professional soccer player.

== Career statistics ==
As of match played October 26, 2025

Club statistics
Club	Season	League			Playoffs		Domestic Cup		Other		Total	
Club	Season	Division	Apps	Goals	Apps	Goals	Apps	Goals	Apps	Goals	Apps	Goals
Whitecaps FC 2	2017	USL	27	3	—		—		—		27	3
Vancouver Whitecaps FC (Note: Signed short-term non-MLS contract)	2017	Major League Soccer	0	0	0	0	0	0	0	0	0	0
Lane United FC	2018	Premier Development League	6	2	—		—		—		6	2
Lane United FC	2019	USL League Two	2	0	—		—		—		2	0
Lane United FC	Total		8	2	0	0	0	0	0	0	8	2
Austria Klagenfurt	2021–22	Austrian Bundesliga	6	0	—		1	0	—		7	0
Austria Klagenfurt	2022–23	Austrian Bundesliga	0	0	—		0	0	—		0	0
Austria Klagenfurt	Total		6	0	0	0	1	0	0	0	7	0
Whitecaps FC 2	2023	MLS Next Pro	24	3	—		—		—		24	3
Para Hills Knights SC	2025	NPL South Australia	4	1	0	0	0	0	—		4	1
Sydney Olympic FC	2025	Australian Championship	3	1	0	0	0	0	—		3	1
Career total			72	10	0	0	1	0	0	0	73	10
