= Oregon State Beavers men's soccer =

American college soccer team

- Founded: 1988; 38 years ago
- University: Oregon State University
- Head coach: Jarred Brookins (2nd season)
- Conference: Pac-12
- Location: Corvallis, Oregon, US
- Stadium: Patrick Wayne Valley Stadium (capacity: 1,500)
- Nickname: Beavers
- Colors: Black and orange
Home	Away

NCAA tournament College Cup
- 2023

NCAA tournament Quarterfinals
- 2021, 2023

NCAA tournament Round of 16
- 2021, 2023

NCAA tournament Round of 32
- 2014, 2018, 2021, 2022, 2023, 2026

NCAA tournament appearances
- 2002, 2003, 2014, 2018, 2020, 2021, 2022, 2023, 2024, 2025, 2026

Conference tournament championships
- 2026

Conference regular season championships
- 2021, 2026

The Oregon State Beavers men's soccer team is an intercollegiate varsity sports team that represents Oregon State University in NCAA college soccer. The Beavers compete in the Pac-12 Conference.

The team was founded in 1988 and has competed in 37 college soccer seasons since that time. The Beavers qualified for the NCAA tournament on nine occasions, making their deepest run in the tournament in 2023 where they made their first appearance in the College Cup as one of the final four teams. The team has produced one Hermann Trophy winner, nine United Soccer Coaches (previously NSCAA) All-Americans and has had numerous players play for their respective national teams at the senior level. The team's all-time match record is 313-303-66 as of the end of the 2024 season.

The current coach of the Beavers is Jarred Brookins, who took the position in January 2025 after serving as an assistant coach at Oregon State the prior two years. Brookins replaced Greg Dalby, who was hired as the men's soccer head coach in 2023.

== Current squad ==
As of November 2026

Note: Flags indicate national team as defined under FIFA eligibility rules; some limited exceptions apply. Players may hold more than one non-FIFA nationality.

No.	Pos.	Nation	Player
0	GK	USA	James Romero
1	GK	USA	John Nicolson
2	DF	ESP	Carlos Martinez
3	DF	USA	Henry Blake
4	DF	ESP	Oriol Vidal
5	DF	USA	Mark Wieder
6	DF	USA	Jacob Zapien
7	FW	USA	Max Eisenberg
8	MF	USA	Diego Rodriguez
9	FW	USA	Wyatt Borso
10	MF	GER	Tim Hoffman
11	FW	USA	Aidan Marquez
12	MF	USA	Milo Wray
13	DF	CAN	Nicolas Pietrantonio
14	FW	USA	Michael Nesci

No.	Pos.	Nation	Player
15	MF	USA	Rocky Wells
16	MF	ESP	Joan Ruiz
18	MF	USA	Oliver Hernandez Parra
19	MF	USA	John Koutelieris
20	MF	ITA	Tommaso Ricordi
21	MF	USA	Evan Carlock
22	MF	USA	Chris Avila
23	FW	ESP	Gonzalo Aranaz
25	DF	USA	Sava Catlett
26	FW	USA	Taylor Rogers
27	GK	USA	Justin Stewart
28	MF	USA	Mason Dimitrijevic
29	FW	USA	Paul Fecteau
33	DF	USA	Gavin Wolff

== MAC Hermann Trophy winners ==
Oregon State is associated with one player who was awarded the Hermann Trophy as the best collegiate player in the country.

- 2020 – Gloire Amanda

== NSCAA All-Americans ==
Oregon State is affiliated with nine NSCAA All-Americans.

- 2009 – Danny Mwanga (second team)
- 2014 – Khiry Shelton (second team)
- 2020 – Gloire Amanda (first team)
- 2021 – Sofiane Djeffal (first team), Tyrone Mondi (third team)
- 2023 - Javier Armas (third team), Logan Farrington (third team)
- 2024 - Arnau Farnos (third team), Sergi Solans (third team)

== Players receiving national caps ==
Oregon State is associated with five players who have represented their home nation at the senior level.

Player	Tenure	Caps	Goals
(Jamaica) Ryan Johnson	2006–2013	36	8
(United States) Robbie Findley	2007–2010	11	0
(United States) Alan Gordon	2012–2015	2	0
(Guyana) Devonte Small	2017	2	0
(Guyana) Emery Welshman	2015–2023	28	11

== MLS SuperDraft Picks ==
Player	Year	Pick No.	Team
Alan Gordon	2004	53	LA Galaxy
Ryan Johnson	2006	26	Real Salt Lake
Robbie Findley	2007	16	LA Galaxy
Danny Mwanga	2010	1	Philadelphia Union
Emery Welshman	2013	16	Toronto FC
Khiry Shelton	2015	2	New York City FC
Will Seymore	2015	56	FC Dallas
Jordan Jones	2018	47	LAFC
Timmy Mueller	2018	63	Portland Timbers
Hassani Dotson	2019	31	Minnesota United
Don Tchilao	2019	36	LA Galaxy
Joe Hafferty	2021	37	Inter Miami
Tsiki Ntsabeleng	2022	28	FC Dallas
Sofiane Djeffal	2022	36	DC United
Logan Farrington	2024	3	FC Dallas
Turner Humphrey	2024	44	FC Dallas
Javier Armas	2024	48	Atlanta United
Enzo Newman	2025	11	FC Dallas
Sergi Solans	2025	30	Real Salt Lake
Arnau Farnos	2025	84	New York City FC
Lucas Fernandez Kim	2026	75	Portland Timbers

== Honors ==
- Winner, Northwest Colleges Soccer Conference (NWCSC) Cascade - 1989
- Winner, Pac-12 Conference - 2021, 2026
- NCAA Tournament Final Four - 2023
