= 2019 WAC men's soccer tournament =

- Classification: Division I
- Teams: 7
- Matches: 6
- Site: Cadet Soccer Stadium; Colorado Springs, Colorado
- Champions: Seattle U (4th title)
- Winning coach: Pete Fewing (4th title)
- MVP: Akili Kasim (Seattle U)
- Broadcast: WAC Digital Network

2019 Western Athletic Conference men's soccer standings
	Conf.					Overall
Team	W		L		T	W		L		T
No. 19 Seattle ‡	10	–	0	–	1	15	–	3	–	5
Utah Valley	8	–	3	–	0	13	–	6	–	2
Air Force	6	–	5	–	0	8	–	11	–	0
CSU Bakersfield	6	–	5	–	0	8	–	11	–	0
San Jose State	5	–	4	–	2	5	–	12	–	2
Cal Baptist ^{#}	5	–	5	–	1	6	–	11	–	2
Houston Baptist	5	–	6	–	0	7	–	11	–	0
Kansas City	5	–	6	–	0	6	–	11	–	0
UTRGV	4	–	5	–	2	8	–	6	–	2
UNLV	4	–	6	–	1	6	–	12	–	1
Incarnate Word	2	–	9	–	0	5	–	12	–	0
Grand Canyon	1	–	7	–	3	4	–	9	–	4
‡ – WAC Tournament Champion + – Invited to the 2019 NCAA tournament ^{#} – Ineligible for post-season (In transition); As of 17 December, 2019; Rankings from United Soccer Coaches

The 2019 WAC men's soccer tournament was the 12th edition of the tournament. It determined the Western Athletic Conference's automatic berth into the 2019 NCAA Division I men's soccer tournament. The tournament began on November 13 and concluded on November 17.

Grand Canyon were the defending champions, beating Seattle U last year. The Seattle U Redhawks won the title, earning their fourth ever WAC Championship, and their fourth ever appearance into the NCAA Tournament. Seattle's sophomore goalkeeper, Akili Kasim, won the Tournament MVP honors.

== Background ==
Grand Canyon Antelopes, who won the tournament after a 1–0 victory over San Jose State in the final. This was the first WAC men's soccer title for Grand Canyon, and the first for coach Schellas Hyndman.

== Seeding ==
The top seven teams qualified for the tournament.

Seed	School	Conf. Record	Points
1	Seattle U	10–0–1	31
2	Utah Valley	8–3–0	24
3	Air Force	6–5–0	18
4	Cal State Bakersfield	6–5–0	18
5	San Jose State	5–4–2	17
6	Houston Baptist	5–6–0	15
7	Kansas City	5–6–0	15

== Bracket ==
First round Nov. 13
4	Cal State Bakersfield	1
5	San Jose State	0
2	Utah Valley	3
7	Kansas City	0
3	Air Force	3
6	Houston Baptist	2

Semifinals; Nov. 15
1	Seattle U	1
4	Cal State Bakersfield	0
2	Utah Valley (pen.)	0 (6)
3	Air Force	0 (5)

Championship; Nov. 17
1	Seattle U (pen.)	0 (2)
2	Utah Valley	0 (1)

== Results ==
=== First round ===
November 13
12:00 PM MST

No. 4 Cal State Bakersfield	1–0	No. 5 San Jose State
Korber 84'	Report

Cadet Soccer Stadium, Colorado Springs, Colorado
Attendance: 87
Referee: Travis Haight

November 13
3:00 PM MST

No. 3 Air Force	3–2	No. 6 Houston Baptist
Spadafora 28'; Aghedo 45'; Daniel 88'	Report	Poblacion 10'; Cobo 63'

Cadet Soccer Stadium, Colorado Springs, Colorado
Attendance: 87
Referee: Joe Pickens

November 13
6:00 PM MST

No. 2 Utah Valley	3–0	No. 7 Kansas City
Frischknecht 31'; Garza 76'; Fuchs 88'	Report

Cadet Soccer Stadium, Colorado Springs, Colorado
Attendance: 87
Referee: Matthew Buckman

=== Semifinals ===
November 15
3:00 PM MST

No. 1 Seattle U	1–0	No. 4 Cal State Bakersfield
Downing 65' (o.g.)	Report

Cadet Soccer Stadium, Colorado Springs, Colorado
Attendance: 101
Referee: Joe Pickens

November 15
6:00 PM MST

No. 2 Utah Valley	0–0 (a.e.t.)	No. 3 Air Force
	Report
Penalties
Garza (penalty scored); Waggoner (penalty missed); Caprio (penalty scored); Wight (penalty scored); Felix (penalty scored); Longmire (penalty scored); Vazquez (penalty scored)	6–5	(penalty scored) Matulis; (penalty scored) Daniel; (penalty missed) Stanley; (penalty scored) Hill; (penalty scored) Spadafora; (penalty scored) Blessing; (penalty missed) Clary

Cadet Soccer Stadium, Colorado Springs, Colorado
Attendance: 145
Referee: Matthew Buckman

=== WAC Championship ===
November 17
1:00 PM MST

No. 1 Seattle U	1–1 (a.e.t.)	Utah Valley
Avila-Good 43'	Report	Felix 35'
Penalties
Morris (penalty scored); Uderitz (penalty scored); McGlynn (penalty missed); Avila-Good (penalty missed)	2–1	(penalty scored) Caprio; (penalty missed) Waggoner; (penalty missed) Wright; (penalty missed) Vazquez; (penalty missed) Felix

Cadet Soccer Stadium, Colorado Springs, Colorado
Attendance: 135
Referee: Turan Oz

== All Tournament Team ==
Player	Team
**WAC Men's Soccer All-Tournament team**
Detre Bell	Cal State Bakersfield
Niklas Korber	Cal State Bakersfield
Kainoa Likewise	Air Force
Nick Blessing	Air Force
Alec Felix	Utah Valley
Mitch Jensen	Utah Valley
Ahmed Longmire	Utah Valley
Julian Avila-Good	Seattle U
Declan McGlynn	Seattle U
Nkosi Burgess	Seattle U
**Akili Kasim**	Seattle U

MVP in Bold
