= WAC men's soccer tournament =

- Conference soccer championship
- Sport: College soccer
- Conference: Western Athletic Conference
- Number of teams: 6
- Format: Single-elimination tournament
- Current stadium: CBU Soccer Field
- Current location: Seattle, Washington
- Played: 1996–1999; 2013–2025
- Last contest: 2025
- Current champion: GCU (2nd. title)
- Most championships: Seattle U (6 titles)
- Official website: wacsports.com/msoc

Sponsors
- Geico, Under Armour, Gatorade, Molton, Gearboss

The WAC men's soccer tournament was the conference championship tournament for soccer for the Western Athletic Conference (since renamed the United Athletic Conference). The tournament has been held every year from 2013 until 2025.

Previously, it was held every year between 1996 and 1999 before the sport was discontinued by the conference for 14 years. It is a single-elimination tournament and seeding is based on regular season records. The winner, declared conference champion, receives the conference's automatic bid to the NCAA Division I men's soccer championship.The WAC stopped sponsoring men's soccer after the 2025 NCAA Division I men's soccer season when all of its members joined other conferences and the WAC was rebranded to the UAC.

Seattle U was the most winning team with 5 titles.

== Champions ==
The following is a list of Western Athletic Conference Tournament winners:

=== Finals ===
Key

- (1) – Title number
- a.e.t. – Match went to extra time
- p – Match decided by a penalty shootout after extra time
- – Winning team won regular season

=== Year by year ===
Ed.	Year	Champion	Score	Runner-up	Venue	City	Tournament MVP
1	1996	Fresno State (1)	2–0	Air Force	Pete Beiden Field	Fresno, CA	Craig Tomlinson (FSU)
2	1997	SMU (1)	4–0	Tulsa	Peter Johann Field	Las Vegas, NV	Daniel Hernández (SMU)
3	1998	Fresno State (2)	0–0 (5–4 p)	Tulsa	Pete Beiden Field	Fresno, CA	Robbie Aristodemo (TUL)
–	1999	(no tournament held)					
–	2000–2012	(WAC did not sponsor men's soccer)					
4	2013	Seattle U (1)	2–1	San Jose State	USAFA Stadium	Colorado Springs, CO	Jake Feener (SU)
5	2014	UNLV (1)	1–1 (4–2 p)	CSU Bakersfield	Championship Field	Seattle, WA	Danny Musovski (UNLV)
6	2015	Seattle U (2)	1–1 (5–4 p)	Utah Valley	Durwood Stadium	Kansas, MO	David Olsen (SU)
7	2016	UNLV (2)	2–1	Air Force	Clyde Field	Orem, UT	Danny Musovski (UNLV)
8	2017	Seattle U (3)	2–1	San Jose State	Peter Johann Field	Las Vegas, NV	Josh Adachi (SU)
9	2018	GCU (1)	1–0	San Jose State	Championship Field	Seattle, WA	George Tasouris (GCU)
10	2019	Seattle U (4)	1–1 (2–1 p)	Utah Valley	Cadet Stadium	Colorado Sp, CO	Akili Kasim (SU)
11	2020	Air Force (1)	3–0	GCU	Peter Johann Field	Las Vegas, NV	Quinn Matulis (AF)
12	2021	Seattle U (5)	2–2 (4–3 p)	GCU	GCU Stadium	Phoenix, AZ	Noe Meza (SU)
13	2022	California Baptist (1)	0–0 (3–1 p)	San Jose State	CBU Soccer Field	Riverside, CA	Nolan Premack (CBU)
14	2023	California Baptist (2)	2–1	UNLV	Peter Johann Field	Las Vegas, NV	Luis Mueller (CBU)
15	2024	Seattle U (6)	3–0	San Jose State	GCU Stadium	Phoenix, AZ	Demian Alvarez (SU)
16	2025	GCU (2)	2–1	San Jose State	CBU Soccer Field	Riverside, CA	Junior Diouf (GCU)

== Performance by school ==
School	Titles	Winning years
Seattle	6	2013, 2015, 2017, 2019, 2021, 2024
California Baptist	2	2022, 2023
UNLV	2	2014, 2016
Fresno State (Note: No longer sponsors men's soccer.)	2	1996, 1998
Grand Canyon	2	2018, 2025
Air Force	1	2020
SMU	1	1997
Total (all schools)	16	

Notes

- Italics indicate a school that is no longer a conference member
