= 2019 Seattle Redhawks men's soccer team =

Men's soccer team

2019 Seattle Redhawks men's soccer

WAC regular season champions WAC tournament champions

NCAA Tournament, Second Round
- Conference: Western Athletic Conference
- U. Soc. Coaches poll: No. 20
- Record: 15–3–5 (10–0–1 WAC)
- Head coach: Pete Fewing (8th season)
- Assistant coaches: Nate Daligcon (7th season); Jake Feener (2nd season)
- Home stadium: Championship Field

2019 Western Athletic Conference men's soccer standings
	Conf.					Overall
Team	W		L		T	W		L		T
No. 19 Seattle ‡	10	–	0	–	1	15	–	3	–	5
Utah Valley	8	–	3	–	0	13	–	6	–	2
Air Force	6	–	5	–	0	8	–	11	–	0
CSU Bakersfield	6	–	5	–	0	8	–	11	–	0
San Jose State	5	–	4	–	2	5	–	12	–	2
Cal Baptist ^{#}	5	–	5	–	1	6	–	11	–	2
Houston Baptist	5	–	6	–	0	7	–	11	–	0
Kansas City	5	–	6	–	0	6	–	11	–	0
UTRGV	4	–	5	–	2	8	–	6	–	2
UNLV	4	–	6	–	1	6	–	12	–	1
Incarnate Word	2	–	9	–	0	5	–	12	–	0
Grand Canyon	1	–	7	–	3	4	–	9	–	4
‡ – WAC Tournament Champion + – Invited to the 2019 NCAA tournament ^{#} – Ineligible for post-season (In transition); As of 17 December, 2019; Rankings from United Soccer Coaches

The 2019 Seattle Redhawks men's soccer team represented Seattle University during the 2019 NCAA Division I men's soccer season and the 2019 Western Athletic Conference men's soccer season. The regular season began on August 30 and concluded on November 9. It was the program's 53rd season fielding a men's varsity soccer team, and their 8th season in the Western Athletic Conference. The 2019 season was Pete Fewing's eighth year as head coach for the program.

== Roster ==
As of December 14, 2019

Note: Flags indicate national team as defined under FIFA eligibility rules; some limited exceptions apply. Players may hold more than one non-FIFA nationality.

No.	Pos.	Nation	Player
0	GK	USA	Dante Perez
1	GK	USA	Akili Kasim
2	MF	SVK	Richard Bedats
4	MF	USA	Hal Uderitz
5	FW	USA	Connor Noblat
6	DF	USA	Kees Westra
7	FW	USA	Noe Meza
8	MF	CAN	Julian Avila-Good
10	MF	USA	Jesse Ortiz
11	FW	ENG	James Morris
12	DF	USA	Alexander Acton-Petronotis
13	FW	USA	Cody Buchanan
14	MF	SCO	Hamish Ritchie
15	MF	GER	Malte Thesenvitz
16	MF	USA	Burke Fahling

No.	Pos.	Nation	Player
17	DF	USA	Nkosi Burgess
18	GK	USA	Zach Nelson
19	DF	NOR	Halvor Hovstad
20	FW	USA	James Burkholder
21	DF	CAN	Thomas Mickoski
22	FW	USA	Declan McGlynn
23	MF	USA	Harrison Kurtz
24	MF	USA	Rory King
25	MF	USA	Tommy Case
26	MF	USA	Edwin Aquino
27	MF	USA	Paolo Colello
29	DF	USA	Sam Tessler
30	DF	USA	Josh Castrillon
31	MF	USA	Riley Patterson

== Schedule ==
Date Time, TV	Rank^{#}	Opponent^{#}	Result	Record	Site (Attendance) City, State
Non-conference regular season
August 30*; 7:00 p.m., WACDN		San Francisco	W 5–0	1–0–0	Championship Field (450); Seattle, WA
September 2*; 6:00 p.m., WACDN		No. 18 Denver	T 0–0 ^{2OT}	1–0–1	Championship Field (465); Seattle, WA
September 6*; 4:00 p.m., ACCNX		at No. 11 Notre Dame	L 2–4	1–1–1	Alumni Stadium (686); Notre Dame, IN
September 8*; 1:00 p.m.		vs. No. 2 Indiana	T 0–0 ^{2OT}	1–1–2	Alumni Field; Notre Dame, IN
September 12*; 7:00 p.m., WACDN		Portland	W 2–0	2–1–2	Championship Field (649); Seattle, WA
September 15*; 6:00 p.m., ROOTSNW		No. 8 Washington; Seattle Cup	L 0–3	2–2–2	Championship Field (1,331); Seattle, WA
September 19*; 7:00 p.m.		at UC Santa Barbara	L 0–1	2–3–2	Harder Stadium (1,000); Santa Barbara, CA
September 23*; 7:00 p.m.		at Cal Poly	W 2–1	3–3–2	Alex G. Spanos Stadium (878); San Luis Obispo, CA
Western Athletic Conference regular season
September 28; 7:00 p.m., WACDN		California Baptist	W 2–0	4–3–2 (1–0–0)	Championship Field (648); Seattle, WA
October 4; 7:00 p.m., WACDN		Houston Baptist	W 5–0	5–3–2 (2–0–0)	Championship Field (501); Seattle, WA
October 6; 1:00 p.m., WACDN		Kansas City	W 4–1	6–3–2 (3–0–0)	Championship Field (271); Seattle, WA
October 11; 7:30 p.m., WACDN		at UNLV	T 2–2 ^{2OT}	6–3–3 (3–0–1)	Johann Memorial Field; Paradise, NV
October 13; 7:00 p.m., WACDN		at Grand Canyon	W 1–0	7–3–3 (4–0–1)	GCU Stadium (986); Phoenix, AZ
October 19; 7:00 p.m., WACDN		at Cal State Bakersfield	W 3–2	8–3–3 (5–0–1)	Main Soccer Field; Bakersfield, CA
October 25; 7:00 p.m., WACDN		Air Force	W 2–1	9–3–3 (6–0–1)	Championship Field (678); Seattle, WA
October 27; 1:00 p.m., WACDN		Utah Valley	W 2–1 ^{OT}	10–3–3 (7–0–1)	Championship Field (422); Seattle, WA
November 1; 3:00 p.m., WACDN		at Incarnate Word	W 1–0	11–3–3 (8–0–1)	Benson Stadium (150); San Antonio, TX
November 3; 11:00 a.m., WACDN		at Texas–Rio Grande Valley	W 1–0	12–3–3 (9–0–1)	UTRGV Soccer Complex (120); Edinburg, TX
November 9; 1:00 p.m., WACDN		San Jose State	W 3–1	13–3–3 (10–0–1)	Championship Field (615); Seattle, WA
WAC Tournament
November 15; 2:00 p.m., ESPN+	(1) No. 21	vs. (4) Cal State Bakersfield; Semifinals	W 1–0	14–3–3	Air Force Soccer Stadium; Colorado Springs, CO
November 17; 12:00 p.m., ESPN+	(1) No. 21	vs. (2) Utah Valley; Championship Game	T 1–1 (2–1 PKs) ^{2OT}	14–3–4	AF Soccer Stadium (135); Colorado Springs, CO
NCAA Tournament
November 21; 7:00 p.m.	No. 20	at Loyola Marymount; First Round	W 3–1	15–3–4	Sullivan Field (940); Los Angeles, CA
November 24; 5:00 p.m., P12N	No. 20	at (7) No. 7 Stanford; Second Round	T 1–1 (1–2 PKs) ^{2OT}	15–3–5	Laird Q. Cagan Stadium (1,047); Stanford, CA
*Non-conference game. ^{#}Rankings from United Soccer Coaches. (#) Tournament seedings in parentheses. All times are in Pacific Time.
