= 2016 Western Athletic Conference men's soccer season =

- League: NCAA Division I
- Sport: Soccer
- Duration: August, 2016 – November, 2016
- Teams: 10

2017 MLS SuperDraft
- Top draft pick: Kyle Bjornethun, Seattle U
- Picked by: Seattle Sounders FC, 88th overall

Regular season
- Season champions: Utah Valley
- Runners-up: Seattle U
- Season MVP: Offensive: Niki Jackson; Defensive: Kyle Bjornethun

Tournament
- Champions: UNLV
- Runners-up: Air Force

Western Athletic Conference men's soccer seasons
- ← 2015 2017 →

2016 Western Athletic Conference men's soccer standings
	Conf.					Overall
Team	W		L		T	W		L		T
Utah Valley	8	–	1	–	1	15	–	4	–	1
Seattle	7	–	1	–	2	11	–	6	–	2
Air Force	6	–	3	–	1	14	–	7	–	1
UNLV ‡	5	–	4	–	1	10	–	12	–	2
Grand Canyon ^{#}	4	–	3	–	3	7	–	10	–	3
UTRGV	4	–	4	–	2	4	–	6	–	8
Cal St. Bakersfield	4	–	6	–	0	6	–	13	–	0
San Jose State	3	–	6	–	1	4	–	13	–	2
Incarnate Word ^{#}	2	–	5	–	3	4	–	9	–	4
Houston Baptist	3	–	7	–	0	5	–	11	–	1
UMKC	1	–	7	–	2	2	–	12	–	2
‡-Tournament Champion + - Invited to the NCAA Division I Men's Soccer Championship ^{#}-Ineligible (In transition); As of 21 November 2016; Rankings from NSCAA

The 2013 Western Athletic Conference men's soccer season is the eighth season of men's varsity soccer in the conference. The conference first sponsored the sport in 1996, but after eight schools split from the WAC in 1999 to form the Mountain West Conference (MW), the WAC only played the 1999 season before disbanding its men's soccer league.

== Changes from 2015 ==
- None

== Teams ==
=== Stadiums and locations ===
Team	Location	Stadium	Capacity
Air Force Falcons	Colorado Springs, Colorado	Air Force Soccer Stadium	1,000
CSU Bakersfield Roadrunners	Bakersfield, California	CSUB Main Soccer Field	2,500
Grand Canyon Antelopes	Phoenix, Arizona	GCU Soccer Field	1,000
Houston Baptist Huskies	Houston, Texas	Sorrells Field	1,250
Incarnate Word Cardinals	San Antonio, Texas	Benson Stadium	6,000
San Jose State Spartans	San Jose, California	Spartan Stadium	30,456
Seattle Redhawks	Seattle, Washington	Seattle University Soccer Stadium	3,000
Texas–Rio Grande Valley Vaqueros	Edinburg, Texas	UTRGV Soccer and Track & Field Complex	2,050
UMKC Kangaroos	Kansas City, Missouri	Stanley H. Durwood Soccer Stadium	850
UNLV Rebels	Paradise, Nevada	Johann Memorial Field	2,500
Utah Valley Wolverines	Orem, Utah	Clyde Field	700

- Chicago State is planning to sponsor men's soccer in the foreseeable future. New Mexico State does not sponsor men's soccer. Air Force, Houston Baptist, Incarnate Word, UNLV and San Jose State are affiliate members.

== Regular season ==
=== Rankings ===
Legend
Increase in ranking
Decrease in ranking
Not ranked previous week

		Pre	Wk 1	Wk 2	Wk 3	Wk 4	Wk 5	Wk 6	Wk 7	Wk 8	Wk 9	Wk 10	Wk 11	Wk 12	Final
Air Force	C					RV	NR								
Cal State Bakersfield	C														
Grand Canyon	C														
Houston Baptist	C														
Incarnate Word	C														
San Jose State	C														
Seattle	C	14	16	RV	NR					RV	RV	RV			
UMKC	C														
UNLV	C														
UTRGV	C														
Utah Valley	C	RV	18	12	19	18	21	RV	RV	21	21	19	23	RV	RV

== Postseason ==
=== WAC tournament ===
First round November 10
4	UNLV	3
5	UTRGV	2
3	Air Force	2
6	CSU Bakersfield	0

Semifinals; November 11
1	Utah Valley	0
4	UNLV	1
2	Seattle U	1
3	Air Force	2

Championship; November 13
4	UNLV	2
3	Air Force	1

=== NCAA tournament ===
Seed	Region	School	1st round	2nd round	3rd round	Quarterfinals	Semifinals	Championship
—	2	UNLV	T, 1–1 ^{W, 6–5 pen.} vs. San Diego State – (San Diego)	L, 0–3 vs. #6 Denver – (Denver)				

== All-WAC awards and teams ==
2016 WAC Men's Soccer Individual Awards
Award	Recipient(s)
Offensive Player of the Year	Niki Jackson, Jr., F, Grand Canyon
Coach of the Year	Greg Maas, Utah Valley
Defensive Player of the Year	Kyle Bjornethun, Sr., D, Seattle U
Freshman of the Year	Timo Mehlich, Fr., MF, UNLV

2016 WAC Men's Soccer All-Conference Teams
First Team	Second Team
Niki Jackson, Jr., F GCU; Danny Musovski, Jr., F, UNLV; Skyler Milne, Sr., F, UVU; Paul Hoffmeister, Jr., MF, UVU; Alex Roldan, Jr., MF, SU; Sergio Rivas, So., MF, SU; Tucker Bone, So., MF, USAFA; Kyle Bjornethun, Sr., D, SU; Alex Neff, Sr., D, UVU; Cameron Duley, Sr., D, USAFA; Mitch Jensen, Jr., GK, UVU	Ben Conway, Sr, F, UIW; Austin Dewing, So., F, USAFA; Karson Payton, Jr., F, UVU; Aaron Meyer, So., MF, UVU; Jonathan Colunga, Sr., MF, SJSU; Timo Mehlich, Fr., MF, UNLV; Sam Langston, Sr., D, SU; Hector Montalvo, Fr., D, GCU; Nathan Aune, So., D, SU; Frederik Frankman, Jr., D, UTRGV; John Wendt, Jr., GK, USAFA

== See also ==
- 2016 NCAA Division I men's soccer season
- 2016 WAC Men's Soccer Tournament
- 2016 Western Athletic Conference women's soccer season
