= 2024 WAC men's soccer tournament =

- Classification: Division I
- Teams: 6
- Matches: 5
- Attendance: 1,725
- Site: GCU Stadium; Phoenix, Arizona
- Champions: Seattle University (6th title)
- Winning coach: Nate Daligcon (1st title)
- MVP: Demian Alvarez (Seattle University)
- Broadcast: ESPN+

2024 Western Athletic Conference men's soccer standings
	Conf.					Overall
Team	W		L		T	W		L		T
San Diego State	7	–	0	–	1	10	–	5	–	3
Seattle U ‡	7	–	1	–	1	12	–	4	–	3
Cal Baptist	4	–	4	–	1	6	–	8	–	5
Utah Valley	3	–	3	–	2	8	–	6	–	4
San Jose State	3	–	3	–	3	6	–	8	–	7
Utah Tech	3	–	4	–	2	4	–	10	–	4
UNLV	2	–	2	–	5	5	–	7	–	5
UTRGV	2	–	3	–	4	4	–	7	–	5
Grand Canyon	2	–	6	–	1	5	–	10	–	3
Air Force	1	–	8	–	0	1	–	15	–	1
‡ – 2024 WAC tournament Champion + – At-large invitation to the 2024 NCAA tournament; As of November 16, 2024; Rankings from United Soccer Coaches; Source: WAC Due to uneven number of matches played, standings based on points per game.

The 2024 Western Athletic Conference men's soccer tournament was the postseason men's soccer tournament for the Western Athletic Conference held from November 10 to November 16, 2024. The five-match tournament took place at GCU Stadium in Phoenix, Arizona on the campus of Grand Canyon University. The six-team single-elimination tournament consisted of three rounds based on seeding from regular-season divisional conference play. The defending champions were the Cal Baptist Lancers. California Baptist was unable to successfully defend their title as the third overall seed, losing to Seattle University in the Semifinals. Seattle would go on to win the tournament, defeating fifth seed San Jose State 3–0 in the Final. This was Seattle's sixth WAC Tournament victory in program history, the most in conference history. It was the first title for second-year head coach Nate Daligcon. As tournament champions, Seattle earned the WAC's automatic bid to the 2024 NCAA Division I men's soccer tournament.

== Seeding ==
Six of the ten Western Athletic Conference men's soccer programs qualified for the 2024 Tournament. Teams were seeded based on their regular season points per game due to an uneven number of games being played by each team. Tiebreakers were used to determine the seedings of teams who finished with identical points per game. No tiebreakers were required as each team finished with a different points per game.

Seed	School	Conference Record	Points	Points per game
1	San Diego State	7–0–1	22	2.75
2	Seattle University	7–1–1	22	2.44
3	Cal Baptist	4–4–1	13	1.44
4	Utah Valley	3–3–2	11	1.38
5	San Jose State	3–3–3	12	1.33
6	Utah Tech	3–4–2	11	1.22

== Bracket ==
First round Sunday, Nov. 10
4	Utah Valley	0
5	San Jose State	1
3	Cal Baptist	1
6	Utah Tech	0

Semifinals; Wednesday, Nov. 13
1	San Diego State	2
5	San Jose State	3
2	Seattle University	3
3	Cal Baptist	1

Final; Sunday, Nov. 16
5	San Jose State	0
2	Seattle University	3

== Schedule ==
=== First round ===
November 10, 2024	#4 Utah Valley	0–1	#5 San Jose State	Phoenix, AZ
4:00 p.m. MST	Gilles Aurelien (yellow card) 2'; Abel Mendoz (yellow card) 9'; Omar Yehya (yellow card) 42'; Ben Ortiz (yellow card) 43'; Tom Dobek-Pietrowski (yellow card) 53'; Ben Williams (yellow card) 89'	Report	(yellow card) 22' Angel Fernandez; 83' (pen.) Angel Iniguez; (yellow card) 83' Diogo Baptista	Stadium: GCU Stadium; Attendance: 327; Referee: Killian Richardson; Assistant referees: Jason Ulrich; Mario Cross; Fourth official: Cody Lofgren

November 10, 2024	#3 Cal Baptist	1–0	#6 Utah Tech	Phoenix, AZ
7:00 p.m. MST	Dominic De Almeida (yellow card) 7'; David Cordes (yellow card) 61'; Blake D'Agostino 62', (yellow card) 74'; Alex Henderson (yellow card) 72'	Report	(yellow card) 53' Austin Wallace; (yellow card) 76' (yellow-red card) 90' Sami Cuevas	Stadium: GCU Stadium; Attendance: 287; Referee: Robi Hunter; Assistant referees: Paul Nothman; Edwin Jimenez; Fourth official: Sam McConnell

=== Semifinals ===
November 13, 2024	#1 San Diego State	2–3	#5 San Jose State	Phoenix, AZ
4:00 p.m. MST	Andre Puente 1', 51', (yellow card) 48' (yellow-red card) 76'; Cianole Nguepissi (yellow card) 66'; Robbie Matei (yellow card) 67'	Report	(yellow card) 46' Gilberto Rivera; 61' Cameron Cook; 64', 78' Angel Iniguez; (yellow card) 79' Team	Stadium: GCU Stadium; Attendance: 171; Referee: Corey Rockwell; Assistant referees: Mersha Kisiel; Ben Scott; Fourth official: Ashton Ching

November 13, 2024	#2 Seattle University	3–1	#3 Cal Baptist	Phoenix, AZ
7:00 p.m. MST	Demian Alvarez (yellow card) 20'; Edgar Leon 27', 78'; Richy Lapointe-Guevara 42'; Mo Mohamed (yellow card) 48'	Report	(yellow card) 40' Tizian Marth; (yellow card) 57' Stavros Charalampous; 60' Leo Mendez; (yellow card) 77' Dominic De Almeida; (yellow card) 90' Luka Kozomara	Stadium: GCU Stadium; Attendance: 195; Referee: Killian Richardson; Assistant referees: Jeff Vance; Nicholas Gastelum; Fourth official: Mark Novosel

=== Final ===
November 16, 2024	#2 Seattle University	3–0	#5 San Jose State	Phoenix, AZ
6:00 p.m. MST	Luke Hammond 22'; Davis Mungomba 30'; Demian Alvarez 61'; Edgar Leon (yellow card) 73'	Report		Stadium: GCU Stadium; Attendance: 745; Referee: Travis Haight; Assistant referees: Corey Rockwell; Ryan Minturn; Fourth official: Anthony Bersano

== Statistics ==
=== Goalscorers ===
There were 14 goals scored in 5 matches, for an average of 2.8 goals per match (as of November 16, 2024).

3 goals

- Angel Iniguez – San Jose State

2 goals

- Edgar Leon – Seattle University
- Andre Puente – San Diego State

1 goal

- Demian Alvarez – Seattle University
- Cameron Cook – San Jose State
- Blake D'Agostino – Cal Baptist
- Luke Hammond – Seattle University
- Richy Lapointe-Guevara – Seattle University
- Leo Mendez – Cal Baptist
- Davis Mungomba – Seattle University

== All-Tournament team ==
Player	Team
Blake D'Agostino	Cal Baptist
Andre Puente	San Diego State
Cameron Cook	San Jose State
Angel Iniguez	San Jose State
Gilberto Rivera	San Jose State
**Demian Alvarez**	Seattle University
Luke Hammond	Seattle University
Charlie Lanphier	Seattle University
Edgar Leon	Seattle University
Mo Mohamed	Seattle University
Titus Washington	Seattle University

MVP in bold
