= 2021 WAC men's soccer tournament =

- Classification: Division I
- Teams: 6
- Matches: 5
- Attendance: 905
- Site: GCU Stadium; Phoenix, Arizona
- Champions: Seattle (5th title)
- Winning coach: Pete Fewing (5th title)
- MVP: Noe Meza (Seattle)
- Broadcast: ESPN+

2021 Western Athletic Conference men's soccer standings
	Conf.					Overall
Team	W		L		T	W		L		T
Grand Canyon +	9	–	2	–	0	15	–	4	–	1
Seattle †	8	–	3	–	0	13	–	8	–	1
Air Force	8	–	3	–	0	10	–	8	–	1
San Jose State	7	–	2	–	2	10	–	7	–	3
California Baptist ^{#}	6	–	3	–	2	11	–	4	–	3
Utah Valley	6	–	4	–	0	9	–	6	–	2
Texas–Rio Grande Valley	5	–	5	–	0	8	–	9	–	0
Incarnate Word	4	–	6	–	1	5	–	10	–	2
Dixie State ^{#}	3	–	7	–	1	4	–	13	–	1
UNLV	3	–	8	–	0	7	–	11	–	0
Houston Baptist	2	–	9	–	0	4	–	14	–	0
Chicago State	0	–	9	–	2	2	–	13	–	3
† – 2021 WAC Tournament Champion + – At-large invitation to the 2021 NCAA tournament # – Ineligible (In transition); As of December 14, 2021; Rankings from United Soccer Coaches; Source: WAC

The 2021 Western Athletic Conference men's soccer tournament was the postseason men's soccer tournament for the Western Athletic Conference held from November 10 to November 14, 2021. The five-match tournament took place at GCU Stadium in Phoenix, Arizona on the campus of Grand Canyon University. The six-team single-elimination tournament consisted of three rounds based on seeding from regular-season divisional conference play. The defending champions were the Air Force Falcons. Air Force was unable to defend their crown, falling 2–2 in a penalty shoot-out against San Jose State in the First Round. Seattle went on to win the title over Grand Canyon in a penalty shoot-out. This was Seattle's fifth WAC Tournament victory in program history all of which have come under head coach Pete Fewing. As tournament champions, Seattle earned the WAC's automatic bid to the NCAA Tournament.

== Seeding ==
Six of the twelve Western Athletic Conference men's soccer programs qualified for the 2021 Tournament. California Baptist and Dixie State were not eligible for the tournament as they transition to Division I. California Baptist would have been the 5th seed if they were eligible. Teams were seeded based on their regular season records. Tiebreakers were used to determine the seedings of teams who finished with identical conference records. A tiebreaker was required to determine the 2nd and 3rd seed as Seattle and Air Force finished with identical 8–3–0 records. Seattle earned the second seed by virtue of a 2–1 victory over Seattle on October 16.

Seed	School	Conference Record	Points
1	Grand Canyon	9–2–0	27
2	Seattle	8–3–0	24
3	Air Force	8–3–0	24
4	San Jose State	7–2–2	23
5	Utah Valley	6–4–0	24
6	Texas–Rio Grande Valley	5–5–0	15

== Bracket ==
First round Wednesday, Nov. 10
4	San Jose State	4
5	Utah Valley	3
3	Air Force	1
6	Texas–Rio Grande Valley	0

Semifinals; Friday, Nov. 12
1	Grand Canyon	4
4	San Jose State	1
2	Seattle	4
3	Air Force	3

Final; Sunday, Nov. 14
1	Grand Canyon	2 (3)
2	Seattle (pen.)	2 (4)

== Schedule ==
=== First round ===
November 10, 2021	#4 San Jose State	4–3	#5 Utah Valley	Phoenix, AZ
4:30 p.m.	Max Allen 21' (pen.); Ryota Nakashima 29'; Rudi Casto 41', (yellow card) 49'; Willy Miranda 55', (yellow card) 60'	Report	4' James Pena; 13' Aaron Nixon; 23' Jojea Kwizera; (yellow card) 81' Mark Brown; (yellow card) 90' Min Kang	Stadium: GCU Stadium; Referee: Arturo Ibarra; Assistant referees: Robi Hullner; Edwin Jimenez; Fourth official: Anthony Bersano

November 10, 2021	#3 Air Force	1–0	#6 Texas–Rio Grande Valley	Phoenix, AZ
7:30 p.m.	Ayman Bushara (yellow card) 71'; Jake Chaffetz (yellow card) 86', (goal) 90'	Report		Stadium: GCU Stadium; Attendance: 195; Referee: Jeff Artholtz; Assistant referees: Paul Nothman; Corey Rockwell; Fourth official: Charles Farr

=== Semifinals ===
November 12, 2021	#1 Grand Canyon	4–1	#4 San Jose State	Phoenix, AZ
4:30 p.m.	Shaun-Chris Joash 56'; Rey Gaytan 75'; Cameron Weller 83'; Justin Rasmussen 88'	Report	77' Rudi Castro; (yellow card) 77' Kameron Bolden	Stadium: GCU Stadium; Referee: Jeff Arthurholtz; Assistant referees: Jason Ulrich; Mark Novosel; Fourth official: Richard Gramolini

November 12, 2021	#2 Seattle	4–3	#3 Air Force	Phoenix, AZ
7:30 p.m.	Hal Uderitz 23' (pen.), (yellow card) 38'; Noe Meza 34'; Levonte Johnson 87'; James Morris 90'	Report	57', 59' Thaddaeus Dewing; 63' Tristan Trager; (yellow card) 88' Tyler Johnson	Stadium: GCU Stadium; Attendance: 710; Referee: Arturo Ibarra; Assistant referees: Mario Coss; Keaton Jarvis; Fourth official: Sam McConnell

=== Final ===
November 14, 2021	#1 Grand Canyon	2–2 (a.e.t.) (3–4 p)	#2 Seattle	Phoenix, AZ
	Marios Andreou (yellow card) 35'; Hugo Logan 37'; Miguel Prado (yellow card) 63'; Georg Bjarnason (yellow card) 71'; Alejandro Fernandez Alcaide (yellow card) 73'; Esai Easley (yellow card) 73'; Shaun-Chris Joash 86', (yellow card) 110'	Report	(yellow card) 57' Alex Acton-Petronotis; (yellow card) 83' Hal Uderitz; (yellow card) 83' Habib Barry; 87' Sam Tessler; 89' Noe Meza; (yellow card) 110' Christian Koontz	Stadium: GCU Stadium; Referee: Travis Haight; Assistant referees: Corey Rockwell; Edwin Jimenez; Fourth official: Mike Ambrose
	Penalties
	Justin Rasmussen (penalty scored); Tosh Yasuda (penalty missed); Esai Easley (penalty scored); Maximilian Moeller (penalty scored); Shaun-Chris Joash (penalty missed)		(penalty scored) James Morris; (penalty scored) Hal Uderitz; (penalty scored) Declan McGlynn; (penalty scored) Alex Acton-Petronotis

== Statistics ==
=== Goalscorers ===
There were 24 goals scored in 5 matches, for an average of 4.8 goals per match.

2 goals

- Thaddaeus Dewing – Air Force
- Shaun-Chris Joash – Grand Canyon
- Rudi Castro – San Jose State
- Noe Meza – Seattle

1 goal

- Jake Chaffetz – Air Force
- Tristan Trager – Air Force
- Rey Gaytan – Grand Canyon
- Hugo Logan – Grand Canyon
- Justin Rasmussen – Grand Canyon
- Cameron Weller – Grand Canyon
- Max Allen – San Jose State
- Willy Miranda – San Jose State
- Ryota Nakashima – San Jose State
- Levonte Johnson – Seattle
- James Morris – Seattle
- Sam Tessler – Seattle
- Hal Uderitz – Seattle
- Jojea Kwizera – Utah Valley
- Aaron Nixon – Utah Valley
- James Pena – Utah Valley

== All-Tournament team ==
Player	Team
**Noe Meza**	Seattle
Hal Udertiz	Seattle
James Morris	Seattle
Levonte Johnson	Seattle
Esai Easley	Grand Canyon
Rey Gaytan	Grand Canyon
Shaun-Chris Joash	Grand Canyon
Thaddeus Dewing	Air Force
Kainoa Likewise	Air Force
Rudi Casto	San Jose State
Jojea Kwizera	Utah Valley

MVP in bold
