= 2017 WAC men's soccer tournament =

- Classification: Division I
- Teams: 7
- Matches: 6
- Site: Peter Johann Memorial Soccer Field; Las Vegas, Nevada
- Broadcast: WAC Digital Network

2017 Western Athletic Conference men's soccer standings
| | Conf. | | | | | Overall |
| Team | W | | L | | T | W | | L | | T |
|---|---|---|---|---|---|---|---|---|---|---|
| Air Force + | 8 | – | 0 | – | 2 | 14 | – | 3 | – | 3 |
| No. 24 Seattle ‡ | 6 | – | 1 | – | 3 | 15 | – | 4 | – | 4 |
| UNLV | 7 | – | 3 | – | 0 | 11 | – | 9 | – | 1 |
| San Jose State | 5 | – | 4 | – | 1 | 9 | – | 11 | – | 1 |
| UTRGV | 4 | – | 4 | – | 2 | 7 | – | 7 | – | 3 |
| Grand Canyon | 4 | – | 5 | – | 1 | 7 | – | 11 | – | 1 |
| Cal St. Bakersfield | 4 | – | 5 | – | 1 | 6 | – | 11 | – | 1 |
| Utah Valley | 3 | – | 5 | – | 2 | 6 | – | 10 | – | 2 |
| UMKC | 3 | – | 7 | – | 0 | 5 | – | 10 | – | 3 |
| Incarnate Word | 3 | – | 7 | – | 0 | 5 | – | 11 | – | 1 |
| Houston Baptist | 2 | – | 8 | – | 0 | 5 | – | 10 | – | 0 |
‡-Tournament Champion + - Invited to the NCAA Division I Men's Soccer Championship; As of November 19, 2017; Rankings from United Soccer Coaches

The 2017 WAC men's soccer tournament was the 10th edition of the tournament. It determined the Western Athletic Conference's automatic berth into the 2017 NCAA Division I Men's Soccer Championship. The defending champions were the UNLV Rebels.

Seattle U won their third WAC title, defeating San Jose State, 2-1 in the championship game. With the win, Seattle U surpassed UNLV and Fresno State with the most WAC Tournament titles. With the berth, Seattle U earned an automatic bid into the NCAA Tournament. There, they upset city-rivals, Washington, in the first round, before falling to Akron in the second round.

== Seeding ==
The top seven teams will qualify for the tournament.

| Seed | School | Conf. Record | Points |
|---|---|---|---|
| 1 | Air Force | 8–0–2 | 26 |
| 2 | Seattle U | 6–1–3 | 21 |
| 3 | UNLV | 7–3–0 | 21 |
| 4 | San Jose State | 5–4–1 | 16 |
| 5 | UTRGV | 4–4–2 | 14 |
| 6 | Cal State Bakersfield | 4–5–1 | 13 |
| 7 | Grand Canyon | 4–5–1 | 13 |

== Bracket ==
First Round; Wednesday, Nov. 8
4 | San José St. | 2
5 | UTRGV | 0
3 | Seattle U | 3
6 | CSU Bakersfield | 0
2 | UNLV | 2
7 | Grand Canyon | 1

Semifinals; Friday, Nov. 10
1 | Air Force | 0
4 | San José St. | 1
3 | Seattle U | 0 (3)
2 | UNLV | 0 (2)

Championship; Sunday, Nov. 12
4 | San José St. | 1
3 | Seattle U | 2

== Schedule ==
=== First Round ===
| November 8 | ^{No. 4} San Jose State | 2–0 | ^{No. 5} UTRGV | Las Vegas, Nevada |
| 1:00 p.m. PST | Wood 56'; Penner 75' | Report | | Stadium: Peter Johann Memorial Soccer Field; Attendance: 1,201; Referee: Vince Apple-Chiarella |

| November 8 | ^{No. 3} Seattle U | 3–0 | ^{No. 6} CSU Bakersfield | Las Vegas, Nevada |
| 4:00 p.m. PST | Barry 40'; Ruiz 48'; Rivas 49' | Report | | Stadium: Peter Johann Memorial Soccer Field; Attendance: 1,201; Referee: Daniel Radford |

| November 8 | ^{No. 2} UNLV | 2–1 | ^{No. 7} Grand Canyon | Las Vegas, Nevada |
| 7:00 p.m. PST | Musovski 48'; Gonzalez 59' | Report | Jackson 50' | Stadium: Peter Johann Memorial Soccer Field; Attendance: 1,201; Referee: Enea Zhonga |

=== Semifinals ===
| November 10 | ^{No. 1} Air Force | 0–1 | ^{No. 4} San Jose State | Las Vegas, Nevada |
| 4:00 p.m. PST | | Report | Romero 73' | Stadium: Peter Johann Memorial Soccer Field; Attendance: 1,093; Referee: Enea Zhonga |

| November 10 | ^{No. 2} UNLV | 0–0 (a.e.t.) (2–4 p) | ^{No. 3} Seattle U | Las Vegas, Nevada |
| 7:00 p.m. PST | | Report | | Stadium: Peter Johann Memorial Soccer Field; Attendance: 1,093; Referee: Vince Apple-Chiarella |
| | Penalties |
| | Musovski (penalty scored); Partida (penalty scored); Mehlich (penalty missed); Gonzalez (penalty missed) | | (penalty scored) Rivas; (penalty scored) Roldan; (penalty scored) Ayala; (penalty scored) Buchanan |

=== Final ===
| November 12 | ^{No. 3} Seattle U | 2–1 | ^{No. 4} San Jose State | Las Vegas, Nevada |
| 1:00 p.m. PST | Aune 36'; Roldan 75' | Report | Farias 87' (o.g.) | Stadium: Peter Johann Memorial Soccer Field; Attendance: 102; Referee: Adam Zarrin |
