= 2022 WAC men's soccer tournament =

- Classification: Division I
- Teams: 6
- Matches: 5
- Attendance: 3,911
- Site: CBU Soccer Field; Riverside, California
- Champions: California Baptist (1st title)
- Winning coach: Coe Michaelson (1st title)
- MVP: Nolan Premack (California Baptist)
- Broadcast: ESPN+

2022 Western Athletic Conference men's soccer standings
	Conf.					Overall
Team	W		L		T	W		L		T
Air Force	7	–	1	–	1	8	–	6	–	3
San Jose State	5	–	2	–	2	10	–	5	–	4
Seattle	5	–	4	–	0	7	–	10	–	1
Utah Valley	5	–	4	–	0	7	–	8	–	1
California Baptist†	4	–	3	–	2	10	–	7	–	4
Grand Canyon	4	–	3	–	2	7	–	8	–	3
Texas–Rio Grande Valley	4	–	4	–	1	7	–	7	–	3
Utah Tech ^{#}	2	–	5	–	2	4	–	12	–	2
Houston Christian	1	–	5	–	3	5	–	8	–	6
UNLV	0	–	6	–	3	1	–	9	–	7
† – 2022 WAC Tournament Champion + – At-large invitation to the 2022 NCAA Tournament # – Ineligible (In transition); As of December 13, 2022; Rankings from United Soccer Coaches; Source: WAC

The 2022 Western Athletic Conference men's soccer tournament was the postseason men's soccer tournament for the Western Athletic Conference held from November 9 to November 13, 2022. The five-match tournament took place at CBU Soccer Field in Riverside, California on the campus of California Baptist University. The six-team single-elimination tournament consisted of three rounds based on seeding from regular-season divisional conference play. The defending champions were the Seattle Redhawks. Seattle was unable to defend their crown, falling 4–0 to San Jose State in the Semifinals. California Baptist went on to win the title in a penalty shoot-out against San Jose State. This was California Baptist's first WAC Tournament victory in program history and first for head coach Coe Michaelson. As tournament champions, California Baptist earned the WAC's automatic bid to the NCAA Tournament.

== Seeding ==
Six of the ten Western Athletic Conference men's soccer programs qualified for the 2022 Tournament. Teams were seeded based on their regular season records. Tiebreakers were used to determine the seedings of teams who finished with identical conference records. A tiebreaker was required to determine the third and fourth seeds as both Seattle and Utah Valley finished with identical 5–4–0 records during the regular season. Seattle earned the third seed by virtue of their 1–0 victory over Utah Valley on October 21 during the regular season. A second tiebreaker was required to determine the fifth and sixth seeds after California Baptist and Grand Canyon finished with identical 4–3–2 regular season records. The two teams tied their regular season match, 0–0 on October 9. California Baptist earned the fifth seed while Grand Canyon was the sixth seed.

Seed	School	Conference Record	Points
1	Air Force	7–1–1	22
2	San Jose State	5–2–2	17
3	Seattle	5–4–0	15
4	Utah Valley	5–4–0	15
5	California Baptist	4–3–2	14
6	Grand Canyon	4–3–2	14

== Bracket ==
First round Wednesday, Nov. 9
4	Utah Valley	1
5	California Baptist	3
3	Seattle	2
6	Grand Canyon	1

Semifinals; Friday, Nov. 11
1	Air Force	0
5	California Baptist	2
2	San Jose State	4
3	Seattle	0

Final; Sunday, Nov. 13
5	California Baptist (pen.)	0 (3)
2	San Jose State	0 (1)

== Schedule ==
=== First round ===
November 9	#3 Seattle	2–1	#6 Grand Canyon	Riverside, CA
4:00 p.m. PT	Habib Barry 32'; Christian Koontz (yellow card) 37'; Jesse Ortiz (yellow card) 45'; Campbell Strong 66'; Taketo Onodera (yellow card) 89'	Report	(red card) 13' Team; Shaun Joash 63' (pen.)	Stadium: CBU Soccer Field; Attendance: 117

November 9	#4 Utah Valley	1–3	#5 California Baptist	Riverside, CA
7:00 p.m. PT	Aaron Nixon 31'	Report	8', (yellow card) 34' Adolfo Pino; (yellow card) 51', (goal) 64' Leo Mendez; 70' Luis Mueller	Stadium: CBU Soccer Field; Attendance: 953

=== Semifinals ===
November 11	#2 San Jose State	4–0	#3 Seattle	Riverside, CA
1:00 p.m. PT	Josh Redfield (yellow card) 17'; Ryota Nakashima 33'; Finlay Wood 34' (pen.); Joel Garcia (yellow card) 67'; Anthony Guzman 86', 87'	Report	(yellow card) 22' Christian Koontz; (yellow card) 51' Bailey Letherman; (yellow card) 67' Mo Mohamed	Stadium: CBU Soccer Field; Attendance: 268

November 11	#1 Air Force	0–2	#5 California Baptist	Riverside, CA
4:00 p.m. PT	Tyler Johnson (yellow card) 83'	Report	56', (yellow card) 83' Bryan Iliohan; 65' Leo Mendez; (yellow card) 84' Nolan Premack	Stadium: CBU Soccer Field; Attendance: 1,157

=== Final ===
November 13	#2 San Jose State	0–0 (a.e.t.) (1–3 p)	#5 California Baptist	Riverside, CA
1:00 p.m. PT	David Sweeney (yellow card) 10'; Mario Barocio (yellow card) 43'; Diego Delgadillo (yellow card) 53'	Report	(yellow card) 38' Anthony Vargas; (yellow card) 41' Antonio Gomez; (yellow card) 69' Georg Bjarnson	Stadium: CBU Soccer Field
	Penalties
	Finlay Wood (penalty missed); Kasper Poulsgaard (penalty scored); Athony Guzman (penalty missed); Herminio Padilla (penalty missed)		(penalty scored) Bryan Iliohan; (penalty scored) Anthony Vargas; (penalty scored) Luis Mueller

== Statistics ==
=== Goalscorers ===
There were 13 goals scored in 5 matches, for an average of 2.6 goals per match.

2 goals

- Leo Mendez – California Baptist
- Anthony Guzman – San Jose State

1 goal

- Bryan Iliohan – California Baptist
- Luis Mueller – California Baptist
- Adolfo Pino – California Baptist
- Shaun Joash – Grand Canyon
- Joel Garcia – San Jose State
- Ryota Nakashima – San Jose State
- Christian Kootnz – Seattle
- Campbell Strong – Seattle
- Aaron Nixon – Utah Valley

== All-Tournament team ==
Player	Team
Thomas Beecham	California Baptist
Antonio Gomez	California Baptist
Leo Mendez	California Baptist
**Nolan Premack**	California Baptist
Shaun Joash	Grand Canyon
Anthony Guzman	San Jose State
Kasper Poulsgaard	San Jose State
Finlay Wood	San Jose State
Peter Kingston	Seattle
Taketo Onodera	Seattle

MVP in bold
