= 2023 WAC men's soccer tournament =

- Classification: Division I
- Teams: 6
- Matches: 5
- Attendance: 2,031
- Site: Peter Johann Memorial Field; Las Vegas, Nevada
- Champions: California Baptist (2nd title)
- Winning coach: Coe Michaelson (2nd title)
- MVP: Luis Mueller (California Baptist)
- Broadcast: ESPN+

2023 Western Athletic Conference men's soccer standings
	Conf.					Overall
Team	W		L		T	W		L		T
No. 23 Seattle U +	7	–	0	–	1	12	–	4	–	3
California Baptist ‡	5	–	1	–	2	9	–	6	–	5
Utah Tech ^{#}	4	–	4	–	0	9	–	9	–	0
UNLV	3	–	3	–	2	7	–	8	–	4
San Jose State	3	–	4	–	1	6	–	8	–	4
Utah Valley	2	–	2	–	4	3	–	7	–	7
Grand Canyon	2	–	4	–	2	7	–	7	–	3
UTRGV	2	–	5	–	1	5	–	9	–	1
Air Force	1	–	6	–	1	1	–	14	–	2
‡ – 2023 WAC tournament Champion + – At-large invitation to the 2023 NCAA tournament # – Ineligible (In transition); As of December 12, 2023; Rankings from United Soccer Coaches; Source: WAC

The 2023 Western Athletic Conference men's soccer tournament was the postseason men's soccer tournament for the Western Athletic Conference held from November 5 to November 11, 2023. The five-match tournament took place at Peter Johann Memorial Field in Las Vegas, Nevada on the campus of UNLV. The six-team single-elimination tournament consisted of three rounds based on seeding from regular-season divisional conference play. The defending champions were the California Baptist Lancers. California Baptist was able to successfully defend their title as the second overall seed in the tournament. This was California Baptist's second WAC Tournament victory in program history, both of which have come under head coach Coe Michaelson. As tournament champions, California Baptist earned the WAC's automatic bid to the NCAA Tournament.

== Seeding ==
Six of the nine Western Athletic Conference men's soccer programs qualified for the 2023 Tournament. Teams were seeded based on their regular season records. Tiebreakers were used to determine the seedings of teams who finished with identical conference records. A tiebreaker was required to determine the fifth and sixth seeds of the tournament as San Jose State and Utah Valley both finished with ten conference regular season points. The two teams tied their regular season match up 1–1. Utah Valley was the fifth seed and San Jose State was the sixth seed.

Seed	School	Conference Record	Points
1	Seattle U	7–0–1	22
2	California Baptist	5–1–2	17
3	Utah Tech	4–4–0	12
4	UNLV	3–3–2	11
5	Utah Valley	2–2–4	10
6	San Jose State	3–4–1	10

== Bracket ==
First round Sunday, Nov. 5
4	UNLV (a.e.t.)	3
5	Utah Valley	2
3	Utah Tech	1
6	San Jose State	0

Semifinals; Wednesday, Nov. 8
1	Seattle U	1
4	UNLV (a.e.t.)	2
2	California Baptist	2
3	Utah Tech	0

Final; Sunday, Nov. 11
4	UNLV	1
2	California Baptist	2

== Schedule ==
=== First round ===
November 5	#4 UNLV	3–2 (a.e.t.)	#5 Utah Valley	Las Vegas, NV
1:00 p.m. PT	Nico Lopez 19', 74', 107', (yellow card) 107'; Cesar Carbajal (yellow card) 73'; Tyler Ware (yellow card) 93'	Report	(yellow card) 31' Alejandro Silva; (yellow card) 45' Omar Yehya; 62', 73' Tom Dobek-Pietrowski; (yellow card) 73' Abel Mendoza; (yellow card) 100' Alex Fritcher	Stadium: Johann Field; Attendance: 500

November 5	#3 Utah Tech	1–0	#6 San Jose State	Las Vegas, NV
4:00 p.m. PT	Damian Arguello (yellow card) 8'; Justin Wallace 26'; AJ Ciampini (yellow card) 59'	Report	(yellow card) 50' Joel Garcia Jr.; (yellow card) 63' David Sweeney; (yellow card) 76' Josh Lucas; (yellow card) 78' Beau Leroux	Stadium: Johann Field; Attendance: 175; Referee: Omeed Azadpour; Assistant referees: Zachary Blanchard; Jose Moralez; Fourth official: Nicolause Weyrauch

=== Semifinals ===
November 8	#1 Seattle U	1–2 (a.e.t.)	#4 UNLV	Las Vegas, NV
4:00 p.m. PT	Mo Mohamed 26'; Habib Famuditimi (yellow card) 120'	Report	21' Hermann Ragnarsson; (yellow card) 61' Louis Hiepen; 110' (pen.) Gabe Sanchez	Stadium: Johann Field; Attendance: 383; Referee: Omeed Azadpour; Assistant referees: Marvo Vivero; Bob Escalera

November 8	#2 California Baptist	2–0	#3 Utah Tech	Las Vegas, NV
7:00 p.m. PT	Georg Bjarnason 13'; Luis Mueller 17'; Adolfo Pino (yellow card) 58'; Antonio Gomez (yellow card) 79'; Anthony Vargas (yellow card) 80'; Thomas Beecham (yellow card) 90'	Report	(yellow card) 79' Bubu Medina; (yellow card) 79' AJ Ciampini; (yellow card) 85' Anthony Godinez	Stadium: Johann Field; Attendance: 383; Referee: Arturo Ibarra; Assistant referees: Kosta Makris; Nich Weyrauch; Fourth official: Cory Mann

=== Final ===
November 11	#2 California Baptist	2–1	#4 UNLV	Las Vegas, NV
1:00 p.m. PT	Lucas Mueller 19', 82', (yellow card) 64'; Erik Krohnstad (yellow card) 28'; Thomas Beecham (yellow card) 43'	Report	(yellow card) 51' Théo Minard; 61' Nico Lopez; (yellow card) 64' Cesar Carbajal	Stadium: Johann Field; Attendance: 590; Referee: Joe Pickens; Assistant referees: Cameron Blanchard; Zachary Blanchard; Fourth official: Killian Richardson

== Statistics ==
=== Goalscorers ===
There were 14 goals scored in 5 matches, for an average of 2.8 goals per match (as of November 11, 2023).

4 goals

- Nico Lopez – UNLV

3 goals

- Luis Mueller – California Baptist

2 goals

- Tom Dobek-Pietrowski – Utah Valley

1 goal

- Georg Bjarnason – California Baptist
- Mo Mohamed – Seattle U
- Hermann Ragnarsson – UNLV
- Gabe Sanchez – UNLV
- Justin Wallace – Utah Tech

== All-Tournament team ==
Player	Team
Thomas Beecham	California Baptist
Leo Mendez	California Baptist
**Luis Mueller**	California Baptist
Nolan Premack	California Baptist
Brophy Howard	UNLV
Nico Lopez	UNLV
Hermann Ragnarsson	UNLV
Gabe Sanchez	UNLV
Austin Wallace	Utah Tech
Tom Dobek-Pietrowski	Utah Valley
Mo Mohamed	Seattle U

MVP in bold
