= 2015 WAC men's soccer tournament =

Tournament details
- Country: United States
- Teams: 6

Final positions
- Champions: Seattle
- Runners-up: Utah Valley

Tournament statistics
- Matches played: 5

Awards
- Best player: David Olsen

The 2015 WAC men's soccer tournament was the 7th edition of the tournament. It determined the Western Athletic Conference's automatic berth into the 2015 NCAA Division I Men's Soccer Championship.

The Seattle Redhawks won the tournament, besting the Utah Valley Wolverines in the championship match.

== Qualification ==
2015 Western Athletic Conference men's soccer standings
	Conf.					Overall
Team	W		L		T	W		L		T
No. 13 Seattle ‡	9	–	1	–	0	18	–	4	–	1
Utah Valley +	6	–	3	–	1	14	–	6	–	2
UNLV	5	–	4	–	1	12	–	7	–	1
Houston Baptist	5	–	4	–	1	9	–	8	–	2
Cal St. Bakersfield	4	–	3	–	3	7	–	6	–	6
San Jose State	4	–	4	–	2	6	–	11	–	1
Air Force	4	–	5	–	1	7	–	9	–	1
UMKC	4	–	5	–	1	6	–	9	–	2
Incarnate Word ^{#}	4	–	6	–	0	8	–	8	–	0
Grand Canyon ^{#}	3	–	7	–	0	7	–	10	–	0
UTRGV	2	–	8	–	0	5	–	12	–	1
‡-Tournament Champion + - Invited to the NCAA Division I Men's Soccer Championship ^{#}-Ineligible (In transition); As of November 29, 2015; Rankings from NSCAA

The top six teams in the Western Athletic Conference based on their conference regular season records qualified for the tournament.

== Bracket ==
Quarterfinals
4	Houston Baptist	0 (2)
5	CSU Bakersfield (pen.)	0 (4)
3	UNLV	3
6	San Jose State	1

Semifinals
1	Seattle	4
5	CSU Bakersfield	0
2	Utah Valley	1
3	UNLV	0

Championship
1	Seattle (pen.)	1 (5)
2	Utah Valley	1 (4)

== Schedule ==
=== Quarter-finals ===
November 12, 2015	UNLV	3–1	San Jose State	Kansas City, Missouri
4:30 PM ET	Partida 18'; Takada 22'; Balelo 72'	Report	Harte 86'	Stadium: Durwood Soccer Stadium; Attendance: 32; Referee: Daniel Radford

November 12, 2015	Houston Baptist	0–0 (a.e.t.) (2–4 p)	CSU Bakersfield	Kansas City, Missouri
7:30 PM ET		Report		Stadium: Durwood Soccer Stadium; Attendance: 32; Referee: Josh Wilkens
	Penalties
	Acuna (penalty scored); Borgmann (penalty scored); Henke (penalty missed); Johnson (penalty missed)		(penalty scored) Vinales; (penalty scored) Zamora; (penalty missed) Duarte; (penalty scored) Arana; (penalty scored) Iniguez

=== Semi-finals ===
November 13, 2015	Utah Valley	1–0	UNLV	Kansas City, Missouri
4:30 PM ET	Milne 66'	Report		Stadium: Durwood Soccer Stadium; Attendance: 55; Referee: Josh Wilkens

November 13, 2015	Seattle	4–0	CSU Bakersfield	Kansas City, Missouri
7:30 PM ET	Roldan 25'; Olsen 27', 57'; Roberts 58'	Report		Stadium: Durwood Soccer Stadium; Attendance: 55; Referee: Daniel Radford

=== Championship ===
November 15, 2015	Seattle	1–1 (a.e.t.) (5–4 p)	Utah Valley	Kansas City, Missouri
1:00 PM ET	Haddadi 87'	Report	Neff 64'	Stadium: Durwood Soccer Stadium; Attendance: 60; Referee: Fotis Bazakos
	Penalties
	Roldan (penalty scored); Langston (penalty scored); Olsen (penalty scored); Rivas (penalty scored); Haddadi (penalty scored)		(penalty missed) Milne; (penalty scored) Buxton; (penalty scored) Neff; (penalty scored) Sackie; (penalty scored) Harguindeguy

== Statistical leaders ==
=== Top goalscorers ===
Rank	Player	College	Goals

As of 15 November 2015

== Tournament Best XI ==
- Danny Musovski, So., F, UNLV
- Kevin Partida, Jr., MF, UNLV
- Nick Clever, Jr., GK, CSU Bakersfield
- Mario Iniguez, Sr., D/MF, CSU Bakersfield
- Alex Neff, Jr., D, Utah Valley
- Skyler Milne, Jr., F, Utah Valley
- Connor Salmon, So., MF, Utah Valley
- Cameron Rohani, Jr., MF, Seattle U
- Sergio Rivas, Fr., MF, Seattle U
- Kyle Bjornethun, Jr., D, Seattle U
- MVP: David Olsen, So., F, Seattle U

== See also ==
- Western Athletic Conference
- 2015 Western Athletic Conference men's soccer season
- 2015 NCAA Division I men's soccer season
- 2015 NCAA Division I Men's Soccer Championship
