= 2018 WAC men's soccer tournament =

- Classification: Division I
- Teams: 7
- Matches: 6
- Attendance: 1,066
- Site: Championship Field; Seattle, Washington
- Champions: Grand Canyon (1st title)
- Winning coach: Schellas Hyndman (1st title)
- MVP: George Tasouris (Grand Canyon)
- Broadcast: WAC Digital Network

2018 Western Athletic Conference men's soccer standings
	Conf.					Overall
Team	W		L		T	W		L		T
No. 12 Air Force +	8	–	2	–	0	17	–	5	–	0
UTRGV	8	–	3	–	0	14	–	6	–	0
Seattle	7	–	4	–	0	13	–	6	–	1
Grand Canyon ‡	6	–	4	–	0	12	–	8	–	1
Utah Valley	6	–	4	–	0	9	–	9	–	0
UNLV	5	–	5	–	1	10	–	10	–	1
San Jose State	5	–	5	–	1	8	–	10	–	3
Cal Baptist ^{#}	5	–	6	–	0	9	–	9	–	1
UMKC	4	–	7	–	0	5	–	12	–	0
Houston Baptist	3	–	6	–	1	5	–	8	–	3
Cal St. Bakersfield	3	–	7	–	1	5	–	12	–	1
Incarnate Word	2	–	9	–	0	2	–	14	–	1
‡-Tournament Champion + - Invited to the NCAA Division I Men's Soccer Championship ^{#}-Ineligible (In transition); As of December 11, 2018; Rankings from United Soccer Coaches

The 2018 WAC men's soccer tournament was the 11th edition of the tournament. It determined the Western Athletic Conference's automatic berth into the 2018 NCAA Division I Men's Soccer Championship.

The defending champions were Seattle U. However, they were unable to defend their title, falling 5–6 in a penalty shootout against San Jose State in the semifinals. The eventual champions were the Grand Canyon Antelopes, who won the tournament after a 1–0 victory over San Jose State in the final. This was the first WAC men's soccer title for Grand Canyon, and the first for coach Schellas Hyndman.

== Background ==
Seattle U won their third WAC title, defeating San Jose State, 2–1 in the championship game. With the win, Seattle U surpassed UNLV and Fresno State with the most WAC Tournament titles. With the berth, Seattle U earned an automatic bid into the NCAA Tournament. There, they upset city-rivals, Washington, in the first round, before falling to Akron in the second round.

== Seeding ==
The top seven teams will qualify for the tournament.

Seed	School	Conf. Record	Points
1	Air Force	8–0–2	26
2	UTRGV	6–1–3	21
3	Seattle U	7–3–0	21
4	Grand Canyon	5–4–1	16
5	Utah Valley	4–4–2	14
6	San Jose State	4–5–1	13
7	UNLV	4–5–1	13

== Bracket ==
First round Nov. 7
4	Grand Canyon (OT)	1
5	Utah Valley	0
2	UTRGV	4
7	UNLV	1
3	Seattle U	3 (5)
6	San Jose State (pen.)	3 (6)

Semifinals; Nov. 9
1	Air Force	0
4	Grand Canyon	1
2	UTRGV	0
6	San Jose State	1

Championship; Nov. 11
4	Grand Canyon	1
6	San Jose State	0

== Schedule ==
=== Quarterfinals ===
November 7
2:00 PM PST

No. 4 Grand Canyon	1–0 (a.e.t.)	No. 5 Utah Valley
Gardner 96'	Report

Championship Field, Seattle, Washington
Referee: Leland Grant

November 7
5:00 PM PST

No. 2 UTRGV	4–1	No. 7 UNLV
Edwards 24'; Dalusma 41', 84'; Akio 57'	Report	Kurtz 11'

Championship Field, Seattle, Washington
Referee: Turan Ozdemir

November 7
8:00 PM PST

No. 3 Seattle U	3–3 (a.e.t.)	No. 6 San Jose State
Meza 18'; Westra 35'; Noblat 46'	Report	Partida 74'; Saylee 75'; Penner 87'
Penalties
(penalty missed) Avila-Good; (penalty missed) Hamish; (penalty scored) Meza; (penalty scored) Ayala; (penalty scored) Uderitz; (penalty scored) Buchanan; (penalty scored) Landeros; (penalty missed) Noblat	5–6	(penalty scored) Allen; (penalty missed) Rios; (penalty scored) Kay; (penalty missed) Khorami; (penalty scored) Miranda; (penalty scored) Partida; (penalty scored) Castillo; (penalty scored) Lemus

Championship Field, Seattle, Washington
Attendance: 588
Referee: Joe Pickens

=== Semifinals ===
November 9
5:00 PM PST

No. 1 Air Force	0–1	No. 4 Grand Canyon
	Report	Afonso 6'

Championship Field, Seattle, Washington
Referee: Turan Ozdemir

November 9
7:00 PM PST

No. 2 UTRGV	0–1	No. 6 San Jose State
	Report	Lemus 79'

Championship Field, Seattle, Washington
Attendance: 276
Referee: Leland Grand

=== Final ===
November 11
1:00 PM PST

No. 4 Grand Canyon	1–0	No. 6 San Jose State
Radilla 23'	Report

Championship Field, Seattle, Washington
Attendance: 202
Referee: Matthew Buckman

== Statistics ==
=== Goalscorers ===
2 Goals

- Rooby Dalusma - UTRGV

1 Goal

- Marco Afonso - Grand Canyon
- William Akio - UTRGV
- Kyle Edwards - UTRGV
- Sam Gardner - Grand Canyon
- Bay Kurtz - UNLV
- Omar Lemus - San Jose State
- Noe Meza - Seattle U
- Connor Noblat - Seattle U
- Jonathan Partida - San Jose State
- Zach Penner - San Jose State
- Alex Radilla - Grand Canyon
- Eddie Saylee - San Jose State
- Kees Westra - Seattle U

== All Tournament Team ==
**2018 WAC Men's Soccer All-Tournament team**
- Marco Afonso, Grand Canyon
- Max Allen, San Jose State
- Rooby Dalusma, UT Rio Grande Valley
- Kyle Edwards, UT Rio Grande Valley
- Sam Gardner, Grand Canyon
- Omer Lemus, San Jose State
- Connor Noblat, Seattle U
- Alex Radilla, Grand Canyon
- Andy Rios, San Jose State
- Sergio Rivas, Seattle U
- **George Tasouris, Grand Canyon**
MVP in Bold
