= Sam Gardner (soccer) =

Canadian soccer player (born 1997)

Samuel Gardner
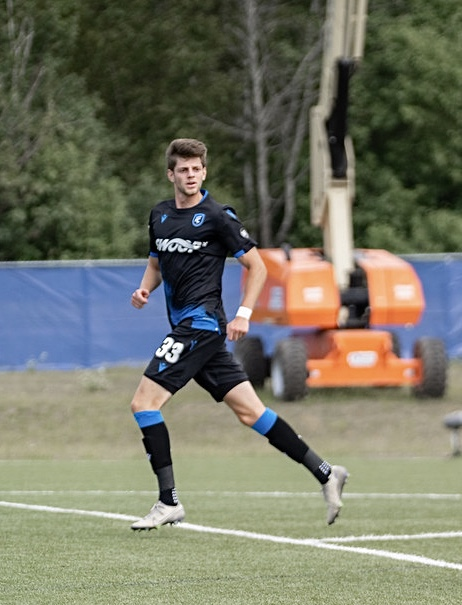
- Gardner with FC Edmonton in 2020

Personal information
- Full name: Samuel Julian Gardner
- Date of birth: 4 April 1997 (age 29)
- Place of birth: Toronto, Ontario, Canada
- Height: 1.80
- Position: Centre-back

Youth career
- Scarborough Blizzard YSC
- North Scarborough SC
- Power FC

College career
Years	Team	Apps	(Gls)
2015–2017	Jacksonville Dolphins	41	(3)
2018	Grand Canyon Antelopes	21	(1)

Senior career*
Years	Team	Apps	(Gls)
2015	Master's Futbol		(7)
2017	K–W United	1	(0)
2019	Sigma FC	8	(1)
2020	FC Edmonton	2	(0)
2022	Cape Town Spurs FC	2	(0)
2022–2023	Alliance United	17	(4)
- * Club domestic league appearances and goals as of June 18, 2023

Samuel Julian Gardner (born 4 April 1997) is a Canadian soccer player who played as a centre-back.

== University career ==
In 2015, Gardner began studying at Jacksonville University, an NCAA Division I school in the ASUN Conference, where he went on to make a total of 41 appearances, scoring three goals in three seasons for the Dolphins. In 2018, he transferred to Grand Canyon University for his senior year. He made 21 appearances for the Antelopes, leading them to 9 clean sheets while also scoring 1 goal and notching 2 assists. Gardner was subsequently named to both the 2018 Western Athletic Conference (WAC) All-Conference team and the 2018 WAC Men's All-Tournament Team after playing a key role in GCU's first-ever WAC Men's Soccer Tournament championship, which was also the school's inaugural appearance at the NCAA Division I Men's Soccer Tournament. Gardner graduated with a Business Administration degree in 2019.

== Club career ==
In 2015, Gardner played for Master's Futbol Academy in League1 Ontario, scoring seven goals.

In 2017, Gardner made one appearance for USL PDL side K–W United.

After college, Gardner had the opportunity to sign with a California-based team in the USL, but he decided to come home in 2019 and returned to the semi-professional League1 Ontario, joining Sigma FC. He made eight league appearances that season, scoring one goal and made one additional appearance in the playoffs.

In early 2020, Gardner trialled with USL Championship side Colorado Springs Switchbacks FC.

On 3 August 2020, Gardner signed his first professional contract with Canadian Premier League side FC Edmonton. He made his professional debut for FC Edmonton as a 20th minute substitute against Atletico Ottawa in a 2–2 draw on August 23.

In January 2022, Gardner started training with GladAfrica Championship side Cape Town Spurs FC. After impressing during his trial, Gardner signed a contract with the South African side in February 2022 until the end of the 2021–2022 season.

In 2022, he began playing for Alliance United of League1 Ontario.

== Personal life ==
Gardner's family is of African descent. His mother, Gill, was born in Zambia and his father, James, was born in South Africa. He also has an older sister, Georgia. In September 2021, Gardner told Yahoo!: "I’m proud to be a Canadian but I’m also very proud to be South African. All my family is still there. I spent many years of my childhood travelling back and forth between South Africa and Canada and would love an opportunity to give back to a community that practically raised me and gave so much to me."
