= 2016 WAC men's soccer tournament =

- Classification: Division I
- Teams: 7
- Matches: 6
- Site: Clyde Field; Orem, Utah
- Champions: UNLV (2nd title)
- Winning coach: Rich Ryerson (2nd title)
- Broadcast: WACTV, ESPN3

2016 Western Athletic Conference men's soccer standings
	Conf.					Overall
Team	W		L		T	W		L		T
Utah Valley	8	–	1	–	1	15	–	4	–	1
Seattle	7	–	1	–	2	11	–	6	–	2
Air Force	6	–	3	–	1	14	–	7	–	1
UNLV ‡	5	–	4	–	1	10	–	12	–	2
Grand Canyon ^{#}	4	–	3	–	3	7	–	10	–	3
UTRGV	4	–	4	–	2	4	–	6	–	8
Cal St. Bakersfield	4	–	6	–	0	6	–	13	–	0
San Jose State	3	–	6	–	1	4	–	13	–	2
Incarnate Word ^{#}	2	–	5	–	3	4	–	9	–	4
Houston Baptist	3	–	7	–	0	5	–	11	–	1
UMKC	1	–	7	–	2	2	–	12	–	2
‡-Tournament Champion + - Invited to the NCAA Division I Men's Soccer Championship ^{#}-Ineligible (In transition); As of 21 November 2016; Rankings from NSCAA

The 2016 WAC men's soccer tournament, was the 9th edition of the tournament. It determined the Western Athletic Conference's automatic berth into the 2016 NCAA Division I Men's Soccer Championship.

UNLV won the WAC title, making it their second WAC championship. The Rebels defeated Air Force in the championship, 2–1.

== Seeding ==
The top six programs qualified for the WAC Tournament. Grand Canyon and Incarnate Word were ineligible for the tournament due to their transition from Division II to Division I soccer. Grand Canyon finished fifth in the regular season table, allowing seventh-place, Cal State Bakersfield to qualify.

No.	School	W	L	T	PCT.	Pts.
1	Utah Valley	8	1	1	.850	25
2	Seattle U	7	1	2	.800	23
3	Air Force	6	3	1	.650	19
4	UNLV	5	4	1	.550	16
5	UTRGV	4	4	2	.500	14
6	Cal State Bakersfield	4	6	0	.400	12

== Bracket ==
First round November 10
4	UNLV	3
5	UTRGV	2
3	Air Force	2
6	CSU Bakersfield	0

Semifinals; November 11
1	Utah Valley	0
4	UNLV	1
2	Seattle U	1
3	Air Force	2

Championship; November 13
4	UNLV	2
3	Air Force	1

== Awards ==
**WAC Men's Soccer All-Tournament team**

Alex Roldan, Seattle U
Jeff Rose, Seattle U
Paul Hoffmeister, Utah Valley
Aaron Meyer, Utah Valley
Trey Pujats, Air Force
Cameron Duley, Air Force
John Sims, Air Force
Oscar Velazquez, UNLV
Timo Mehlich, UNLV
Enrique Adame, UNLV
**Danny Musovski**, UNLV

MVP's in Bold
