= Seattle Redhawks men's soccer =

American college soccer team

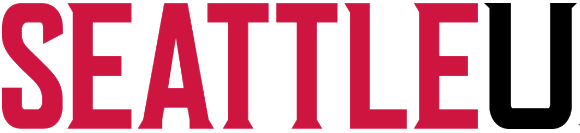
- Founded: 1967; 59 years ago
- University: Seattle University
- Head coach: Pete Fewing (25th season)
- Conference: WCC
- Location: Seattle, Washington, US
- Stadium: Championship Field (capacity: 1,700)
- Nickname: Redhawks
- Colors: Red and white
Home	Away

NCAA tournament Round of 16
- 2015

NCAA tournament Round of 32
- 2013, 2015, 2017, 2019

NCAA tournament appearances
- 2013, 2015, 2017, 2019, 2021, 2023, 2024

Conference tournament championships
- 2013, 2015, 2017, 2019, 2021, 2024

Conference regular season championships
- 2013, 2015, 2019, 2023

The Seattle Redhawks men's soccer program represents the Seattle University in all NCAA Division I men's college soccer competitions. Founded in 1967, the Redhawks compete in the West Coast Conference. The Redhawks are coached by Nate Daligcon, who served as an assistant coach for 10 seasons before being promoted to head coach in 2023. Seattle U plays their home matches at Championship Field, on the campus of Seattle University.

Over the course of the program's history, the Redhawks have played at various levels of collegiate athletics. In 1997 they won the NAIA National Championship. In 2004 they won the NCAA Div II National Championship. In 2013, Seattle joined as a full-member of the Western Athletic Conference. In their first season as a DI member, the Redhawks qualified for the NCAA Division I Men's Soccer Tournament, with their best performance coming in 2015, where they reached the Round of 16.

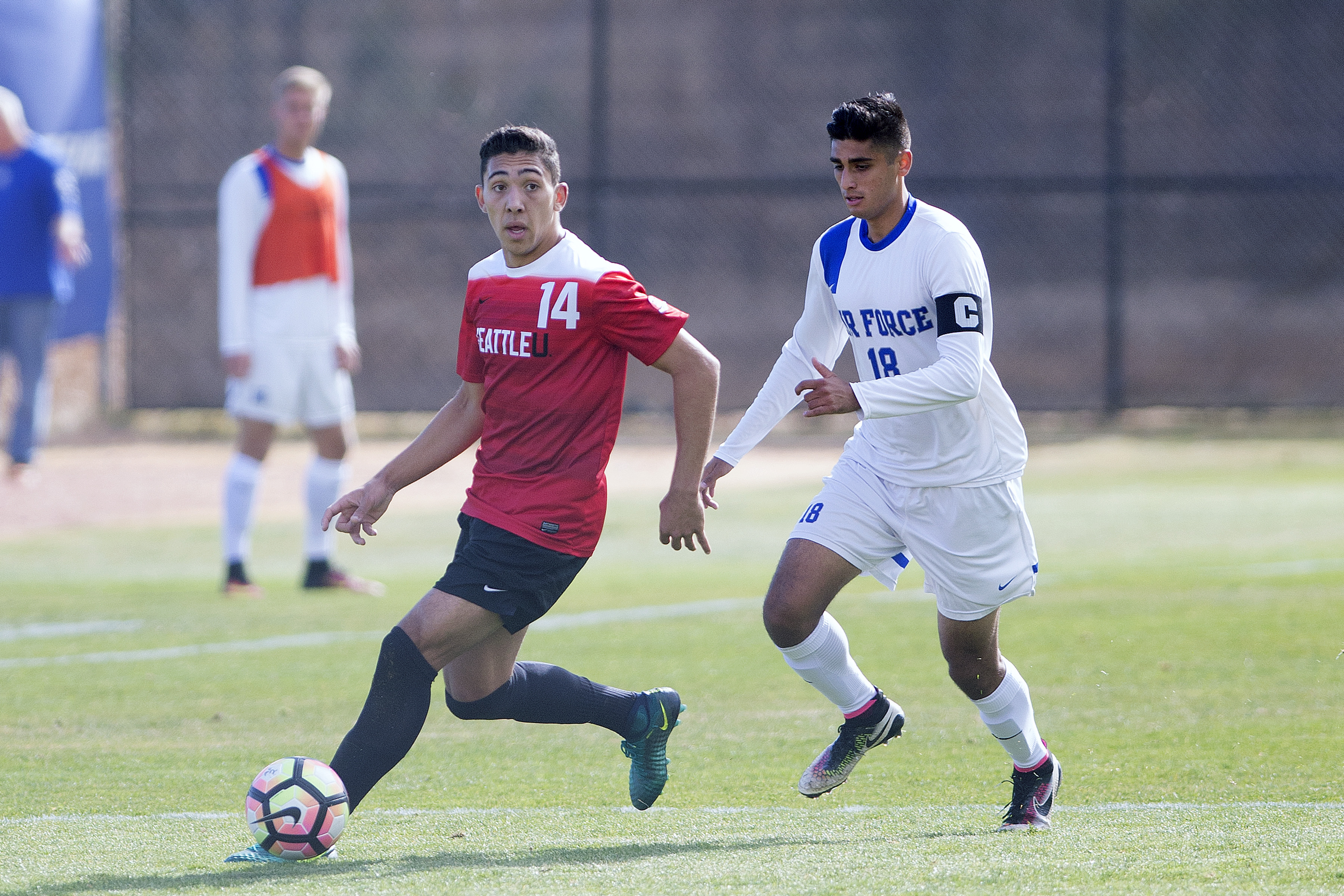
A soccer match between Seattle and Air Force in 2016

== Seasons ==
The following are Seattle University's records since joining the WAC in 2013.

Season	Coach	Overall	Conference	Standing	Postseason
Western Athletic Conference (2013–present)
2013	Pete Fewing	11–9–3	7–0–3	1st	WAC Champions; NCAA Second Round
2014	Pete Fewing	11–5–3	6–2–2	2nd	WAC Semifinals
2015	Pete Fewing	18–4–1	9–1–0	1st	WAC Champions; NCAA Round of 16
2016	Pete Fewing	11–6–2	7–1–2	2nd	WAC Semifinals
2017	Pete Fewing	15–4–4	6–1–3	2nd	WAC Champions; NCAA Second Round
2018	Pete Fewing	13–6–1	7–4–0	3rd	WAC First Round
2019	Pete Fewing	15–3–5	10–0–1	1st	WAC First Round; NCAA Second Round
2020	Pete Fewing	6–4–1	4–2–1	4th	WAC Semifinals
2021	Pete Fewing	13–8–1	8–3–0	T–2nd	WAC Champions; NCAA First Round
2022	Pete Fewing	7–10–1	5–4–0	T–3rd	WAC Semifinals
2023	Nate Daligcon	12–4–3	7–0–1	1st	WAC Semifinals
2024	Nate Daligcon	12–4–4	7–1–1	2nd	WAC Champions; NCAA First Round
WAC Total:		144–67–29	83–19–14		
Total:		144–67–29			
National champion Postseason invitational champion Conference regular season champion Conference regular season and conference tournament champion Division regular season champion Division regular season and conference tournament champion Conference tournament champion

== Rivalries ==
- Washington — Washington Huskies are the crosstown-rival of the Redhawks. As of the conclusion of the 2024 season, Washington leads the series 49–9–6. The game is known as the Fewing Cup.
- Portland — The Portland Pilots are the cascade rivals of the Redhawks. Since 2008, the Pilots lead the series 5–3–1.
- Gonzaga — The Gonzaga Bulldogs are rivals of the Redhawks. Since 2003, the Bulldogs lead the series 5-4.

== Team honors ==
=== Conference championships ===
Seattle U has won three WAC championships.

Season	Conference	Coach	Conference Record	Overall Record
2013	WAC	Pete Fewing	7–0–3	11–9–3
2015	WAC	Pete Fewing	9–1–0	18–4–1
2017	WAC	Pete Fewing	6–1–3	15–4–4
2019	WAC	Pete Fewing	10–0–1	15–3–5
2021	WAC	Pete Fewing	8–3	13–8–1
