= Bryheem Hancock =

American soccer player (born 1980)

Personal information
- Date of birth: March 1, 1980 (age 46)
- Place of birth: Middletown, Delaware, United States
- Position: Goalkeeper

Team information
- Current team: UT Rio Grande Valley Vaqueros (head coach)

College career
Years	Team	Apps	(Gls)
1998–2001	UConn Huskies		

Senior career*
Years	Team	Apps	(Gls)
2002	Los Angeles Galaxy	0	(0)
2002–2003	Atlanta Silverbacks	36	(0)
2004	Toronto Lynx	24	(0)
Total		60	(0)

International career
1997	United States U-17	2	(0)

Managerial career
- 2009–2016: South Florida Bulls (assistant)
- 2017–2020: Radford Highlanders
- 2021–: UT Rio Grande Valley Vaqueros
- * Club domestic league appearances and goals

Bryheem Hancock (born March 1, 1980) is an American former professional soccer player who played as a goalkeeper for clubs in the Major League Soccer and A-League. He is the head coach at University of Texas Rio Grande Valley.

== Club career ==
Hancock was born in Middletown, Delaware. He began playing soccer during his tenure at the University of Connecticut. During his four-year tenure at Connecticut, Hancock's accomplishments were leading the Huskies to an NCAA Division I National Championship in 2000. In the same year he was named to the NCAA College Cup All-Tournament Team. To add to his list of achievements Hancock was named Big East Goalkeeper of the Year in 2001 as well as earning All-American status. In his senior season, he was honored with the 2001 Leadership Student-Athlete Award. Hancock even managed to break the collegiate shutout record at 15. Upon graduating from Connecticut he was drafted by the LA Galaxy in 2002, being the first goalkeeper selected in the 2002 MLS SuperDraft.

After failing to appear in a single match for the Galaxy, Hancock was released from his contract and signed with the Atlanta Silverbacks of the A-League on April 19, 2002. Hancock quickly established himself as the first choice goalkeeper for Atlanta. He managed to claim the Southern Derby for the Silverbacks, and led them to the playoffs by finishing 3rd in the Southeast Conference. The following season Hancock led the A-League in saves with 114, and was named the Atlanta Silverback MVP while recording the team record for most saves in a season and most saves in a single game.

Hancock left Atlanta in 2004 resulting in him to sign with the Toronto Lynx on March 23, 2004. He was brought in to replace Theo Zagar, who departed to rivals Rochester Rhinos. In the earlier stages of the season he competed with Richard Goddard for the starting position, but ultimately was made the Lynx's first choice goaltender. He made his Toronto debut on April 17, 2004, in a 1–0 victory over the Puerto Rico Islanders, where he recorded his first clean sheet of the season. Hancock managed to record four shoutouts during the season. On August 26, 2004, he was awarded the Toronto Lynx Best Defensive Player Award primarily for establishing a new team record for most saves in a season. Hancock subsequently retired from soccer after his contract expired with the Lynx.

== International career ==
Hancock made his debut for United States in the 1997 FIFA U-17 World Championship. He was the starting goalkeeper in the tournament and made his debut against Oman. He would make another appearance, but this time against Brazil.

== Managerial career ==
On June 6, 2009, Hancock was appointed assistant coach for the University of South Florida, where he will primarily coach the goalkeepers. In 2020, he was named the head coach for UT Rio Grande Valley Vaqueros.
