= Timo Mehlich =

German footballer

Personal information
- Date of birth: 12 August 1997 (age 29)
- Place of birth: Mönchengladbach, Germany
- Height: 1.84 m (6 ft 0 in)
- Position: Midfielder

Team information
- Current team: SSVg Velbert
- Number: 23

Youth career
- 2010–2014: Borussia Mönchengladbach
- 2014–2016: 1. FC Mönchengladbach

College career
| Years | Team | Apps | (Gls) |
| 2016–2019 | UNLV Rebels | 79 | (25) |

Senior career*
| Years | Team | Apps | (Gls) |
| 2016 | 1. FC Mönchengladbach | 6 | (2) |
| 2017 | OKC Energy U23 | 5 | (2) |
| 2020 | Rio Grande Valley FC | 4 | (0) |
| 2021–2022 | SV Straelen | 39 | (2) |
| 2022– | SSVg Velbert | 111 | (12) |
- * Club domestic league appearances and goals as of 24 June 2026

Timo Mehlich (born 12 August 1997) is a German footballer who plays as a midfielder for SSVg Velbert.

== Career ==
=== Youth ===
Mehlich began playing with the Borussia Mönchengladbach academy in 2010, where he stayed until 2014. After being released from the Borussia academy, Melich joined Oberliga Niederrhein side 1. FC Mönchengladbach. Whilst with the team, he made six first team appearances, scoring two goals and tallying two assists.

=== College & PDL ===
In 2016, Mehlich moved to the United States to play college soccer at the University of Nevada, Las Vegas, where he played for four years.

While at college, Mehlich also appeared for USL PDL side OKC Energy U23 during their 2017 season.

=== Professional ===
On 9 January 2020, Mehlich was selected 52nd overall in the 2020 MLS SuperDraft by Seattle Sounders FC. However, he instead opted to join USL Championship side Rio Grande Valley FC on 11 January 2020.

He made his professional debut on 8 March 2020, starting in a 5–1 loss to LA Galaxy II.

On 5 January 2021, Mehlich joined Regionalliga West side SV Straelen.
