= Nate Daligcon =

American soccer player and coach (born 1974)

Personal information
- Full name: Nathan Daligcon
- Date of birth: August 9, 1974 (age 52)
- Place of birth: Seattle, Washington, U.S.
- Height: 5 ft 9 in (1.75 m)
- Position: Midfielder

College career
| Years | Team | Apps | (Gls) |
| 1992–1995 | Seattle Pacific Falcons | | |

Senior career*
| Years | Team | Apps | (Gls) |
| 1996–1997 | Seattle Sounders | 16 | (1) |
| 1997–2001 | Rochester Rhinos | 106 | (16) |
| 2002 | Seattle Sounders | 24 | (0) |
| Total | | 146 | (17) |

Managerial career
- 2009–2012: Seattle Pacific Falcons (asst.)
- 2013: Seattle Redhawks (asst.)
- 2014–2022: Seattle Redhawks (associate head coach)
- 2023–: Seattle Redhawks
- * Club domestic league appearances and goals

Nathan "Nate" Daligcon is an American retired soccer midfielder who played professionally in the A-League. Over his eight-year professional career, Daligcon won four league and one U.S. Open Cup titles.

== Early life ==
In 1992, Daligcon graduated from Highline High School.

== Collegiate career ==
He attended Seattle Pacific University, playing on the men's soccer team from 1992 to 1995. In 1993, Daligcon and his team mates won the NCAA Men's Division II Soccer Championship. He was a 1994 Second Team and a 1995 First Team Division II All American. He graduated in 1996 with a bachelor's degree in marketing.

== Professional ==
On March 4, 1996, the Tampa Bay Mutiny selected Daligcon in the third round (twenty-fourth overall) of the 1996 MLS College Draft. The Mutiny released him late in the pre-season. He then signed with the Seattle Sounders of the A-League. That season, he played in the A-League championship game as the Sounders defeated the Rochester Rhinos. Daligcon returned to the Sounders in 1997, but played only four games that season before being traded, along with Justin Stoddard, to the Rhinos in exchange for Henry Gutierrez.

Dalgicon won three league (1998, 2000, and 2001) and one U.S. Open Cup (1999) championship in five seasons with the Rhinos.

In 2003, he returned to the Sounders for a final season before retiring.

In 2017, Daligcon was inducted into the Rhinos Hall of Fame.

== Coaching career ==
In 2009, Daligcon became an assistant coach for the Seattle Pacific University Falcons men's soccer team, eventually becoming lead assistant coach before leaving after the 2012 season.

Prior to the 2013 season, Daligcon joined the coaching staff for the Seattle University Redhawks men's soccer team as an assistant coach. In July 2014, Daligcon was promoted to associate head coach of the Red Hawks under head coach Pete Fewing.
