= Danny Musovski =

American-born Macedonian footballer (born 1995)

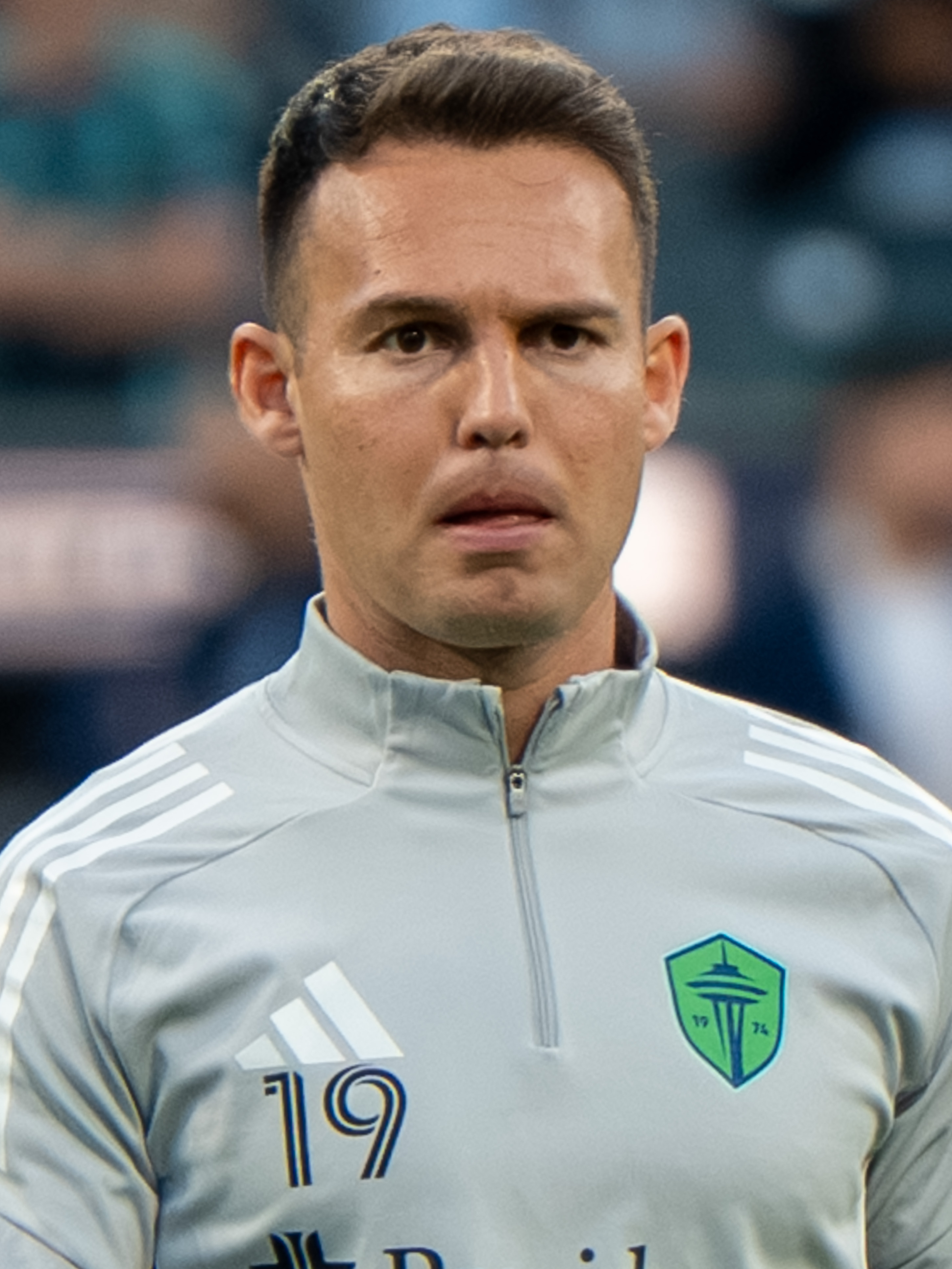
- Musovski with the Seattle Sounders in 2025

Personal information
- Full name: Daniel Musovski
- Date of birth: November 30, 1995 (age 30)
- Place of birth: Henderson, Nevada, U.S.
- Height: 6 ft 0 in (1.83 m)
- Positions: Forward; winger

Team information
- Current team: Seattle Sounders FC
- Number: 19

Youth career
- 2006–2014: Las Vegas Sports Academy

College career
Years	Team	Apps	(Gls)
2014–2017	UNLV Rebels	78	(47)

Senior career*
Years	Team	Apps	(Gls)
2014–2015	Las Vegas Mobsters	13	(1)
2016	Burlingame Dragons FC	7	(6)
2017	FC Tucson	3	(0)
2018	San Jose Earthquakes	0	(0)
2018	→ Reno 1868 FC (loan)	17	(5)
2019	Reno 1868 FC	23	(11)
2020–2022	Los Angeles FC	53	(11)
2021–2022	→ Las Vegas Lights FC (loan)	15	(5)
2022–2023	Real Salt Lake	23	(5)
2024–	Seattle Sounders FC	63	(17)

International career^{‡}
2026–	North Macedonia	2	(0)
- * Club domestic league appearances and goals as of May 11, 2025 ‡ National team caps and goals as of March 27, 2026

Daniel Musovski (Macedonian: Дени Мусовски; born November 30, 1995) also known as Danny Musovski is a professional footballer who plays as a forward for Major League Soccer club Seattle Sounders FC. Born in the United States, he represents the North Macedonia national team.

== Early life and college ==
Born in the Henderson, Nevada, with roots from the Prilep villages, Musovski is of Macedonian descent.

Prior to starting college, Musovski was named the Nevada Gatorade Player of the Year as a high school junior, and set the state high school record for single-season goals as a senior at 58. At UNLV, he played four years of college soccer, from 2014 to 2017, during which he scored 47 goals in 78 appearances. He was a two-time All-America selection, and as a senior earned WAC Offensive Player of the Year honors.

Musovski made seven appearances for PDL side Burlingame Dragons FC in 2016 and scored six goals.

== Club career ==
On January 10, 2018, Musovski was selected 30th overall by the San Jose Earthquakes during the 2018 MLS SuperDraft. He was signed by the club on March 1, 2018, and immediately loaned to San Jose's USL affiliate, Reno 1868 FC, alongside fellow SuperDraft pick Mohamed Thiaw. Musovski made his professional debut as a second-half substitute for Chris Wehan in Reno's 4–3 loss to Swope Park Rangers on March 17, 2018. He scored his first professional goal in his second appearance on March 24, 2018, in a 1–1 draw with Las Vegas Lights FC, a match from which he was later ejected. Musovski was released by San Jose at the end of their 2018 season.

Musovski joined Reno 1868 permanently on January 17, 2019, following his release by San Jose.

On December 10, 2019, Musovski joined Major League Soccer side Los Angeles FC ahead of the 2020 season. He made his debut for the club on July 13, 2020, against Houston in the MLS is Back Tournament as a substitute for Adama Diomande in the 79th minute. On September 2, 2020, Musovski scored his first goal with LAFC in a 5–1 win over San Jose. On October 11, 2020, Musovski scored a brace in a 3–1 win over the Seattle Sounders.

Musovski scored his first goal while on loan to USL Championship side Las Vegas Lights FC in a 3–1 loss to Sacramento Republic FC in the 2021 USL Championship season.

On August 3, 2022, Musovski was traded to Real Salt Lake in exchange for $250,000 in General Allocation Money. His contract option was declined by the club at the end of the 2023 season; according to Musovski, negotiations for a renewed contract had broken down, which led to frustration. He sat out of several matches in the latter half of the season.

While in free agency, Musovski signed a two-year contract with Seattle Sounders FC on February 1, 2024. He scored one goal for the team in the 2024 season as he primarily played as a late-match substitute. Musovski was injured at the end of the regular season and did not appear for most of the 2024 MLS Cup playoffs. He scored in five consecutive matches during the 2025 regular season while playing in place of Jordan Morris, who had been injured for several weeks. On August 24, 2025, Musovski scored three goals in a 5–2 victory over Sporting Kansas City. This was his first hat trick in Major League Soccer, and earned him the Player of the Matchday award for MLS matchday 30.

== International career ==
Born in the United States, Musovski is of Macedonian descent. He was called up to the North Macedonia national team for 2026 FIFA World Cup qualification play off match in March 2026.

== Personal life ==
Musovski announced his engagement to Nikki Klassen in April 2025.

== Career statistics ==
=== Club ===
As of match played May 10, 2025

Appearances and goals by club, season and competition
Club	Season	League			U.S. Open Cup		Continental		Other		Total	
Club	Season	Division	Apps	Goals	Apps	Goals	Apps	Goals	Apps	Goals	Apps	Goals
FC Tucson	2017	USL PDL	3	0	1	0	—		—		4	0
San Jose Earthquakes	2018	MLS	0	0	—		—		—		0	0
Reno 1868 (loan)	2018	USL	17	5	2	2	—		—		19	7
Reno 1868	2019	USLC	23	11	1	0	—		1 (Note: Appearances in USL Championship Playoffs)	0	25	11
Los Angeles FC	2020	MLS	15	5	—		3 (Note: Appearances in CONCACAF Champions League)	0	—		18	5
Los Angeles FC	2021	MLS	22	4	—		—		—		22	4
Los Angeles FC	2022	MLS	16	2	3	2	—		—		19	4
Los Angeles FC	Total		53	11	3	2	3	0	—		59	13
Las Vegas Lights (loan)	2021	USL	12	5	—		—		—		12	5
Las Vegas Lights (loan)	2022	USL	3	0	—		—		—		3	0
Las Vegas Lights (loan)	Total		15	5	—		—		—		15	5
Real Salt Lake	2022	MLS	3	0	—		—		—		3	0
Real Salt Lake	2023	MLS	20	5	4	2	—		4 (Note: Appearances in Leagues Cup)	2	28	9
Real Salt Lake	Total		23	5	4	2	—		4	2	31	9
Seattle Sounders FC	2024	MLS	24	1	3	1	—		3	0	30	2
Seattle Sounders FC	2025	MLS	10	5	—		34	3	0	0	37	18
Career total			168	43	14	7	7	1	8	2	197	53

== Honors ==
Los Angeles FC

- MLS Cup: 2022

Seattle Sounders FC

- Leagues Cup: 2025

Collegiate

- NSCAA National Player of the Week (November 18, 2014)
- 2014 WAC All-Tournament
- 2014 WAC Tournament MVP
- 2015 NSCAA 2nd Team All-American
- 2015 TopDrawerSoccer Best XI Third Team
- 2015 College Soccer News 3rd Team All-American
- 2015 NSCAA All-West Region First Team
- 2015 WAC Offensive Player of the Year
- 2015 All-WAC First Team
- 2016 MAC Hermann Trophy Watch List
- 2016 All-WAC First Team
- 2016 WAC All-Tournament
- 2016 WAC Tournament MVP
- 2016 NSCAA All-West Region Second Team
- TopDrawerSoccer National Player of the Week (November 15, 2016)
