= Lou Sagastume =

Guatemalan-American soccer player and coach

Personal information
- Full name: Luis Sagastume
- Date of birth: 1944 (age 81–82)
- Place of birth: Guatemala
- Positions: Midfielder; defender

College career
Years	Team	Apps	(Gls)
1964–1967	San Francisco Dons		

Senior career*
Years	Team	Apps	(Gls)
1968–1969	Oakland Clippers	0	(0)
1975	San Antonio Thunder	9	(0)

Managerial career
- 1964–1974: St. Ignatius Wildcats
- 1967–1968: San Francisco Dons (assistant)
- 1974–1976: Chico State Wildcats (assistant)
- 1975: San Antonio Thunder
- 1977–1978: St. Ignatius Wildcats
- 1977–1978: San Francisco State Gators
- 1979–2006: Air Force Falcons
- 2007–: St. Mary's Pirates
- * Club domestic league appearances and goals

Luis "Lou" Sagastume (born 1944) is a retired Guatemalan-American soccer player who spent three seasons in the North American Soccer League and coached at the youth, collegiate and professional levels. He was the head coach of the Air Force Falcons for 28 years before retiring in 2009

== Player ==
=== Youth ===
While born in Guatemala, Sagastume grew up in northern California and graduated from Lincoln High School. He attended the University of San Francisco where he was a midfielder on the men's soccer team from 1964 to 1967. He was team captain his junior and senior seasons and was a 1966 Second Team All American, the same year the Dons won the NCAA Men's Soccer Championship. He graduated in 1968 and was inducted into the Dons Hall of Fame in 1974.

=== Professional ===
In 1968, the Oakland Clippers of the North American Soccer League signed Sagastume, but he saw no first team games during his two seasons with them. In 1975, he became a player-coach with the San Antonio Thunder of the NASL.

== Coach ==
In 1964, Sagastume began his coaching career as the head coach of the St. Ignatius College Preparatory boys' soccer team. In 1967, Sagastume became the head coach of the University of San Francisco junior varsity soccer team. Over two seasons, the Dons JV team ran to a 30–2 record. In 1974, he moved to Cal State Chico as an assistant coach and remained there for four seasons. In 1975, he was a player-coach with the San Antonio Thunder of the North American Soccer League. In 1977, he returned to St. Ignatius to coach the boys' team for two more seasons. In 1978, while he was coaching St. Ignatius, San Francisco State hired Sagastume as head coach of the men's soccer team. Over two seasons, his teams went 22–8. In 1980, he became the head coach of the United States Air Force Academy men's soccer team. He compiled a 303–196–43 with the Falcons before retiring on April 10, 2007. In the fall of 2007, he became the coach of the St. Mary's High School soccer team.

In 2009, Sagastume was inducted into the San Francisco State Gators Hall of Fame.

Sagastume was named to the West Coast Conference Wall of Honor in December 2023.
