= Jaiden Waggoner =

American soccer player

Personal information
- Date of birth: February 3, 1997 (age 29)
- Place of birth: Payson, Utah, United States
- Height: 6 ft 0 in (1.83 m)
- Position: Defender

Youth career
- 2011–2015: La Roca FC

College career
Years	Team	Apps	(Gls)
2015–2016	BYU Cougars	15	(1)
2017–2019	Utah Valley Wolverines	43	(0)

Senior career*
Years	Team	Apps	(Gls)
2017	Albuquerque Sol	0	(0)
2020	Las Vegas Lights	11	(0)
- * Club domestic league appearances and goals as of October 4, 2020

Jaiden Waggoner (born February 3, 1997) is an American soccer player.

== Career ==
=== College and amateur ===
Waggoner began playing college soccer at Brigham Young University, where he played soccer with the college team in the USL PDL. In his sophomore year he transferred to Utah Valley University, where he played for a further three seasons.

Waggoner also spent time in the PDL with Albuquerque Sol, but never made an appearance for the team.

=== Professional ===
On July 8, 2020, Waggoner signed with USL Championship side Las Vegas Lights. He made his professional debut on August 15, 2020, starting in a 1–0 loss to Orange County SC.
