= Championship Field =

Soccer stadium in Seattle, Washington, US

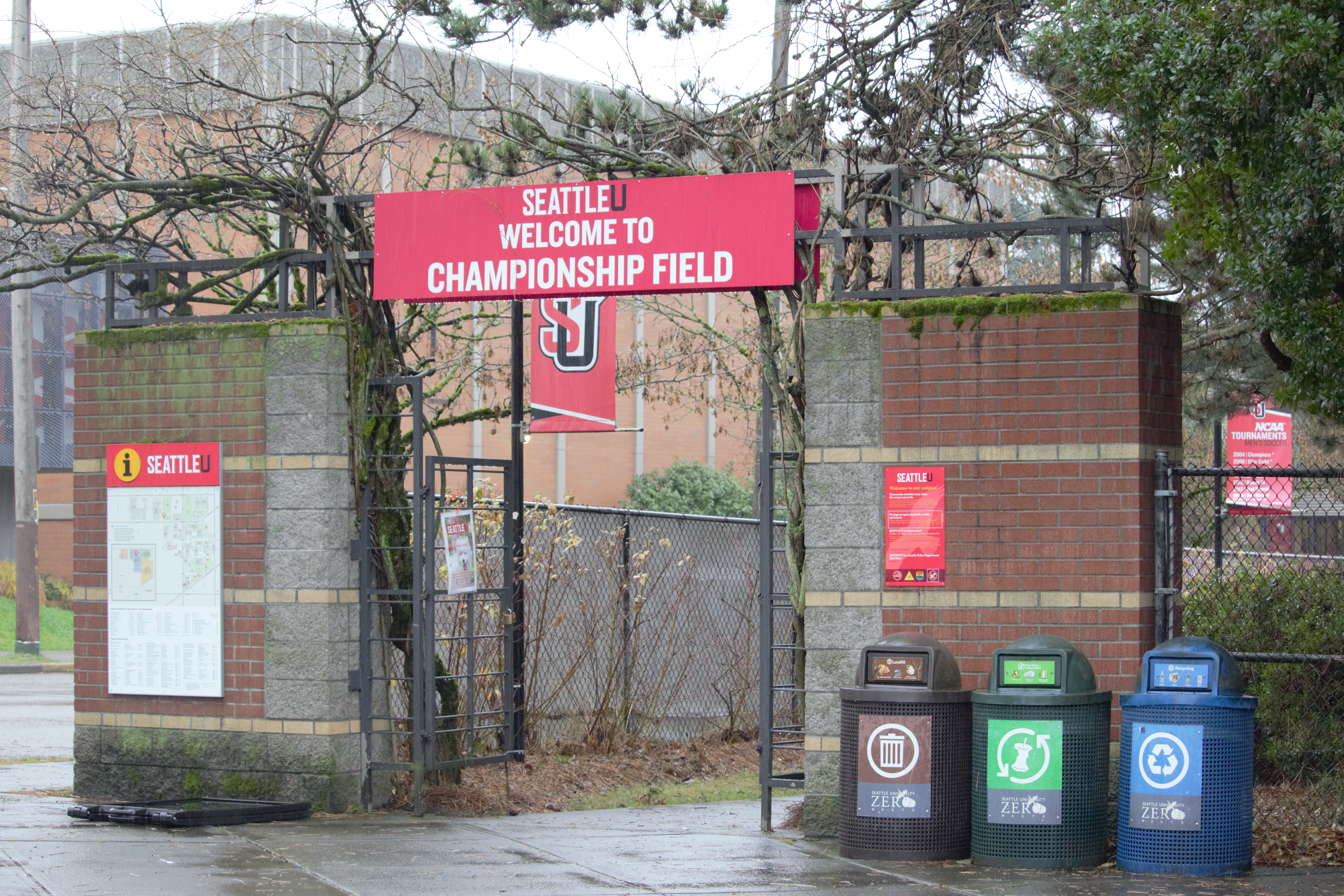
- Interactive map of Championship Field
- Coordinates: 47.606890734642725°N 122.31483974568773°W
- Owner: Seattle University
- Capacity: 1,000 (650 seated)
- Surface: Grass
- Record attendance: 1,737

Construction
- Opened: 1994
- Renovated: 2015

Tenants
- Seattle University men's soccer Seattle University women's soccer

Championship Field is a soccer-specific stadium on the campus of Seattle University in Seattle, Washington. It is home to the Seattle Redhawks men's and women's soccer teams.

The stadium was built in 1994 and has a seated capacity of 650.

== History ==
The stadium was named "Championship Field" after Seattle won the 1997 NAIA Men's Soccer Championship.

The stadium underwent major renovations in 2005 after Seattle won the 2004 NCAA Division II Men's Soccer Championship.

The record attendance is 1,737, which was set on September 24, 2015 as Seattle defeated Washington by a score of 2–1.
