= GCU Stadium =

Collegiate soccer venue in Phoenix, Arizona

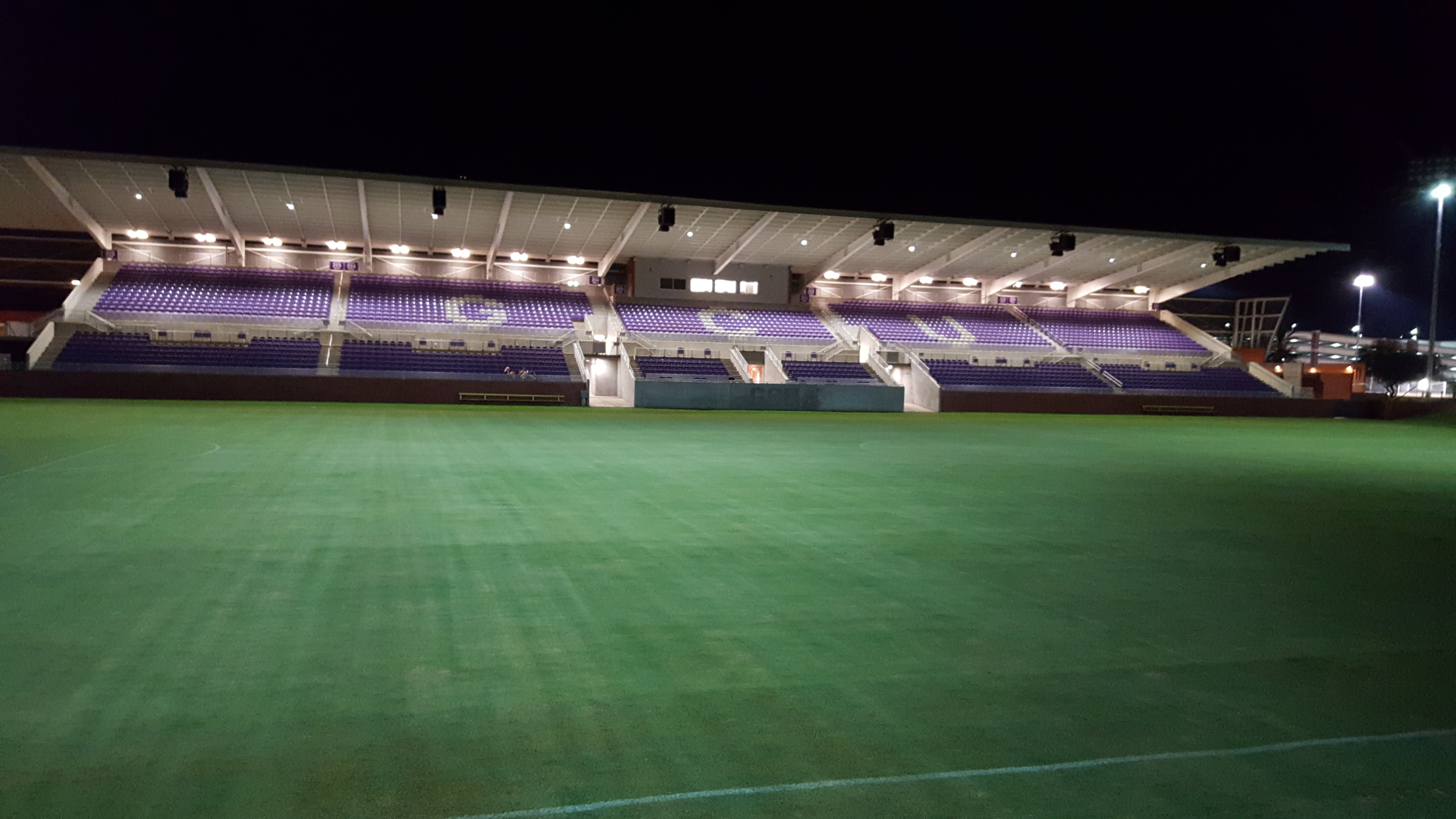
- Night view of the stadium in 2016
- Interactive map of GCU Stadium
- Full name: Grand Canyon University Stadium
- Address: 3300 W Camelback Road; Phoenix, AZ; United States
- Coordinates: 33°30′43″N 112°07′52″W
- Owner: Grand Canyon University
- Operator: GCU Athletics
- Capacity: 6,000
- Type: Soccer-specific stadium
- Surface: Natural grass
- Field size: 110 x 73 m

Construction
- Groundbreaking: May 2015
- Opened: August 19, 2016; 10 years ago

Tenants
- Grand Canyon Antelopes (NCAA) teams: men's and women's soccer (2016–present)

Website
- gculopes.com/gcu-stadium

The GCU Stadium (complete name "Grand Canyon University Stadium") is a collegiate soccer soccer-specific stadium located on the campus of Grand Canyon University in Phoenix, Arizona. The venue has a capacity of 6,000 and includes a full-sized (120 x 80 yard) soccer field. The field is located on the west end of the school's campus, sitting directly in front of Antelope Gymnasium, the university's secondary indoor athletic facility, and is in close proximity to Brazell Field at GCU Ballpark, home of the GCU baseball program.

The facility debuted on August 19, 2016 when the stadium hosted 6,402 fans for a Grand Canyon Antelopes men's soccer game against the UCF Knights. The debut crowd featured the most fans to watch a collegiate soccer game in the state of Arizona. GCU Stadium hosts the school's men's and women's soccer teams.

== History ==
Construction of the stadium began in May 2015, following the end of the 2014-2015 academic year. The land was previously a large, synthetic turf recreational field used for intramural sports, club sports such as lacrosse, and various team's practice spaces. The old field also hosted home lacrosse games for the GCU Club Lacrosse team, which won the MCLA title in the spring of 2015. The artificial turf surface was moved to another on-campus location near the student union and GCU Arena.

Plans for the facility were unveiled at the press conference announcing the hiring of renowned collegiate soccer coach and former FC Dallas coach Schellas Hyndman. Grand Canyon's Vice President of Athletics, Mike Vaught, made both announcements on January 15, 2015. The hiring of Hyndman expedited plans for the soccer field which were already in the works. The stadium was originally scheduled to open in time for Hyndman's inaugural season, starting in August 2015. However, construction was not completed in time.

== Structure ==
The stadium runs north to south with the permanent seating on the west end of the venue, where 3,000 covered seats are located. The remaining three sides of the facility (north, south, east) are grass berm seating, bringing the stadium's official capacity to over 6,000.

== Soccer ==
The first official game at GCU Stadium was played on August 19, 2016, when the university's men's soccer team defeated UCF 4-2.

As Arizona's only NCAA Division I men's soccer program, Grand Canyon University CEO Brian Mueller made it clear that the university will work to make it a noteworthy event on campus. Mueller said in the unveiling press conference, "We're going to elevate soccer here to be a premier sport, because we need a premier sport in the fall."

The venue will include a video display and a state-of-the-art sound system.

Hyndman told GCU Today, the university's news outlet, that he envisions Phoenix's climate and GCU's state-of-the-art facility potentially leading to the hosting of the NCAA Division I Men's Soccer Championship, which currently rotates venues every year.
