= UT Rio Grande Valley Vaqueros men's soccer =

American college soccer team

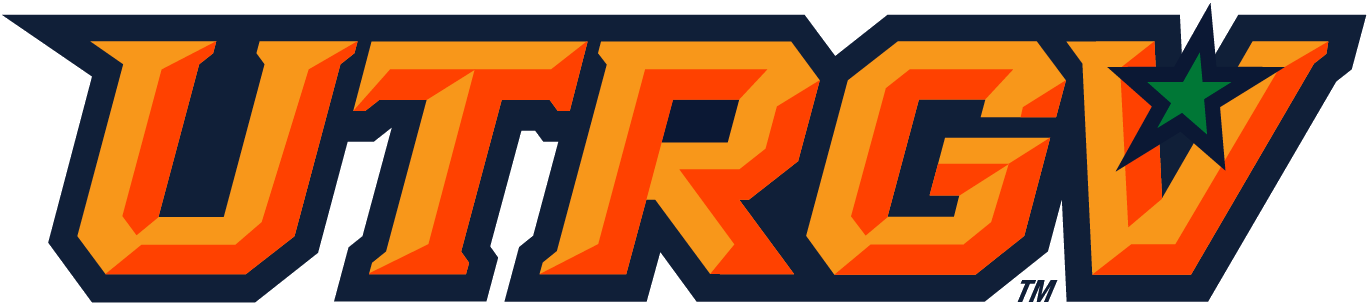
- Founded: 1987; 2015 (relaunched)
- Folded: 1997 (hiatus)
- University: University of Texas Rio Grande Valley
- Head coach: Bryheem Hancock (1st season)
- Conference: OVC
- Location: Edinburg, Texas, US
- Stadium: UTRGV Soccer and Track & Field Complex (capacity: 1,250)
- Nickname: UTRGV, Vaqs
- Colors: Orange and gray
Home	Away

Conference regular season championships
- 1992

The Texas–Rio Grande Valley Vaqueros men's soccer program represents the University of Texas Rio Grande Valley in all NCAA Division I men's college soccer competitions. Founded in 1987, and relaunched in 2015, the Vaqueros are competing in the 2025 season as an independent before becoming an associate member of the Ohio Valley Conference in 2026. They are coached by Bryheem Hancock . Vaqueros plays their home matches at the UTRGV Soccer and Track & Field Complex.

== History ==
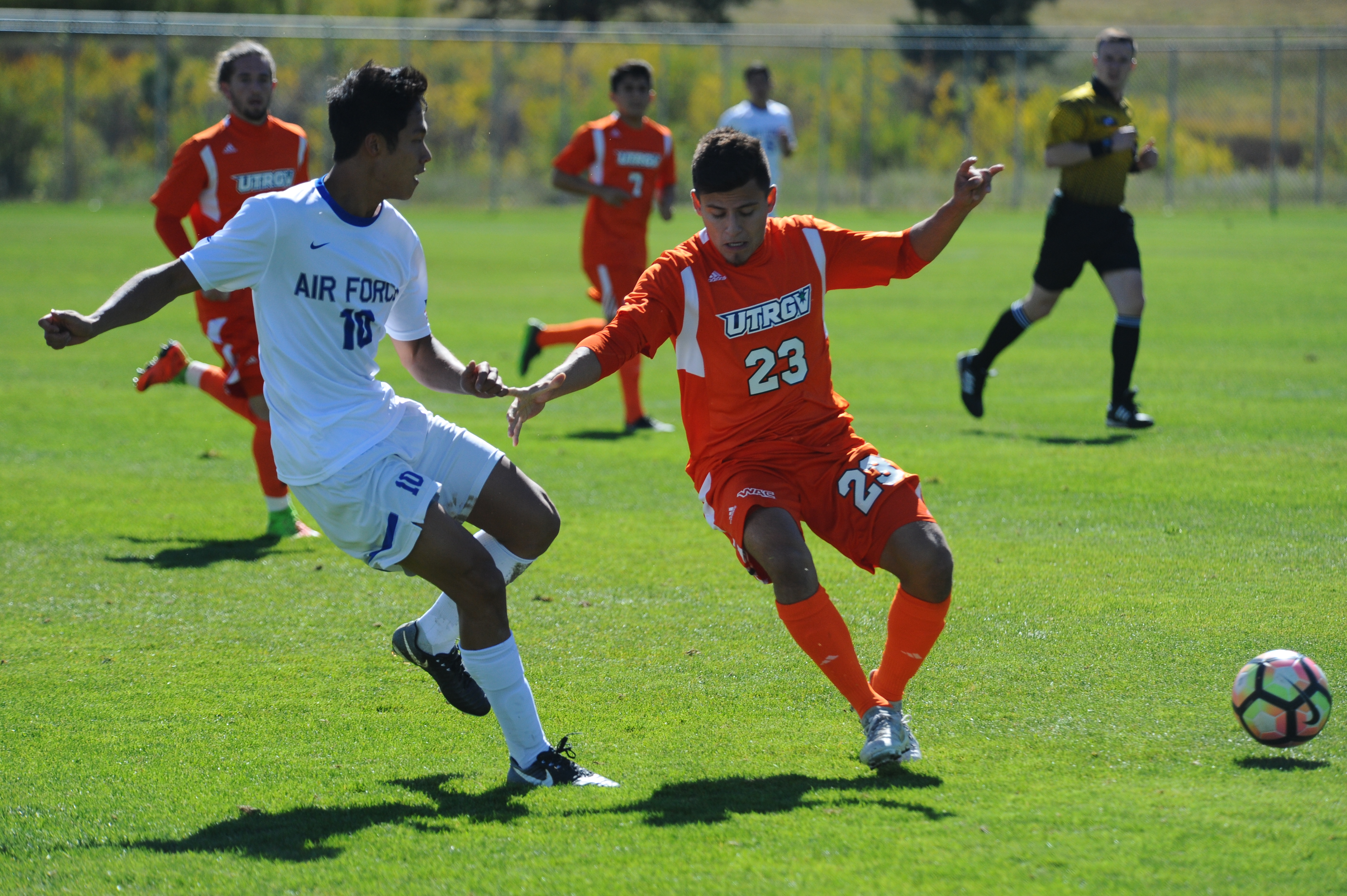
A match between UTRGV and Air Force in 2017

=== Coaching records ===
Manager	Year(s)	Overall	Conference
Eloy Moran	1987–1994	54–55–6 (.496)	2–8–0 (.200)
Miguel Paredes	1995–1997	8–32–1 (.207)	0–4–0 (.000)
Paul Leese	2015–2019	40–40–9 (.500)	22–24–6 (.481)
Bryheem Hancock	2020–present	30–34–11 (.473)	19–18–8 (.511)

== Seasons ==
National champions †	Conference champions *	Division champions ‡	NCAA Tournament berth ^

Season	Head coach	Conference	Season results							Tournament results	
Season	Head coach	Conference	Overall			Conference				Conference	NCAA
Season	Head coach	Conference	W	L	T	W	L	T	Finish	Conference	NCAA
As UT Pan-American (1987–1997)
1987	Eloy Moran	Independent	8	9	0	—	—	—	—	—	—
1988	Eloy Moran	Independent	8	6	2	—	—	—	—	—	—
1989	Eloy Moran	Independent	7	8	1	—	—	—	—	—	—
1990	Eloy Moran	Independent	6	6	0	—	—	—	—	—	—
1991	Eloy Moran	Sun Belt	10	5	1	—	—	—	3rd of 8	Quarterfinals	—
1992*	Eloy Moran	Sun Belt	11	2	0	—	—	—	1st of 8*	Semifinals	—
1993	Eloy Moran	Sun Belt	4	7	0	—	—	—	7th of 8	Fifth place	—
1994	Eloy Moran	Sun Belt	0	12	0	0	4	0	8th of 8	Quarterfinals	—
1995	Miguel Paredes	Sun Belt	2	10	0	1	4	0	—	—	—
1996	Miguel Paredes	Sun Belt	4	12	0	1	4	0	—	—	—
1997	Miguel Paredes	Independent	2	10	1	—	—	—	—	—	—
Hiatus from 1998 to 2014
2015	Paul Leese	WAC	5	12	1	2	8	0	11th of 11	—	—
2016	Paul Leese	WAC	6	9	3	4	4	2	5th of 11	Quarterfinals	—
2017	Paul Leese	WAC	7	7	3	4	4	2	5th of 11	Quarterfinals	—
2018	Paul Leese	WAC	14	6	0	8	3	0	2nd of 12	Semifinals	—
2019	Paul Leese	WAC	8	6	2	4	5	2	2nd of 12	Semifinals	—
2020	Bryheem Hancock	WAC	6	2	2	6	1	2	9th of 12	—	—
2021	Bryheem Hancock	WAC	8	9	0	5	5	0	7th of 12	Quarterfinals	—
2022	Bryheem Hancock	WAC	7	7	3	4	4	1	7th of 10	—	—
2023	Bryheem Hancock	WAC	5	9	1	2	5	1	8th of 9	—	—
2024	Bryheem Hancock	WAC	4	7	5	2	3	4	8th of 10	—	—

== Rivalries ==
UTRGV's two primary rivals are the in-state rivals of the WAC, Houston Baptist and Incarnate Wood.

- Houston Christian — Series tied 6–6–0
- Incarnate Word — UTRGV leads 5–4–1

UTRGV victories	Houston Christian victories	Tie games

No.	Date	Location	Winner	Score
1	Sept. 19, 1987	Bayland Park	Houston Christian	5–4
2	Oct. 16, 1987	UTSA Soccer Field	UTRGV	2–1
3	Oct. 9, 1988	UPTA Soccer Field	UTRGV	3–2
4	Oct. 18, 1988	Bayland Park	Houston Christian	3–1
5	Sept. 8, 1989	House Park	UTRGV	3–2
6	Sept. 20, 1989	Bayland Park	Houston Christian	3–2
7	Oct. 14, 1989	Bayland Park	UTRGV	2–1
8	Sept. 29, 1990	Bayland Park	Houston Christian	9–6
9	Nov. 8, 2015	UTRGV Soccer Complex	Houston Christian	2–1
10	Oct. 16, 2016	Sorrels Field	Houston Christian	3–1
11	Oct. 26, 2017	Sorrels Field	UTRGV	3–1
12	Oct. 7, 2018	UTRGV Soccer Complex	UTRGV	2–1
13	Oct. 11, 2019	Sorrels Field	UTRGV	4–0
14	Mar. 31, 2021	Sorrels Field	UTRGV	4–3
15	Oct. 16, 2021	UTRGV Soccer Complex	UTRGV	1–0
16	Nov. 5, 2022	UTRGV Soccer Complex	UTRGV	3–0
17	Sept. 18, 2024	Sorrels Field	Houston Christian	1–0
Series: UTRGV leads 10–7

UTRGV victories	Incarnate Word victories	Tie games

No.	Date	Location	Winner	Score
1	Aug. 30, 1987	UTPA Soccer Field	Incarnate Word	3–1
2	Aug. 31, 1988	Crusader Soccer Field	Incarnate Word	3–2
3	Aug. 27, 1989	Crusader Soccer Field	Tie	1–1
4	Oct. 17, 1989	UTPA Soccer Field	UTRGV	4–2
5	Sept. 14, 1991	Crusader Soccer Field	Incarnate Word	2–1
6	Oct. 11, 1992	Crusader Soccer Field	UTRGV	3–2
7	Oct. 25, 2015	Crusader Soccer Field	Incarnate Word	1–0
8	Oct. 27, 2016	UTRGV Soccer Complex	UTRGV	2–0
9	Nov. 4, 2017	Crusader Soccer Field	UTRGV	2–1
10	Nov. 3, 2018	UTRGV Soccer Complex	UTRGV	3–0
11	Nov. 9, 2019	Gayle and Tom Benson Stadium	Incarnate Word	2–0
12	Apr. 9, 2021	UTRGV Soccer Complex	UTRGV	1–0
13	Nov. 6, 2021	Gayle and Tom Benson Stadium	UTRGV	2–1
14	Oct. 26, 2022	UTRGV Soccer Complex	UTRGV	2–0
15	Aug. 31, 2023	Gayle and Tom Benson Stadium	UTRGV	3–0
16	Aug. 31, 2024	UTRGV Soccer Complex	Incarnate Word	2–1
Series: UTRGV leads 9–6–1
