= Pete Fewing =

American soccer coach and broadcaster

Peter Fewing
Personal information
- Date of birth: 1962 or 1963 (age 63–64)
- Position: Midfielder

College career
Years	Team	Apps	(Gls)
1983–1984	Washington Huskies		

Senior career*
Years	Team	Apps	(Gls)
1985–1990	FC Seattle Storm		
1995	Everett BigFoot (indoor)		

Managerial career
- 1988–2005: Seattle Redhawks
- 2010–2011: Kitsap Pumas
- 2012–2023: Seattle Redhawks
- * Club domestic league appearances and goals

Peter Fewing (born 1962 or 1963) is an American soccer coach and former player for the FC Seattle Storm of the Western Soccer Alliance. He was head coach of the Seattle University Redhawks from 1988 to 2005 and 2012 to 2023. Fewing is also part of the broadcasting team for Seattle Sounders FC of Major League Soccer.

== Playing career ==
Fewing graduated from Highline High School in Burien, Washington, where he led the team to a state championship in his senior year. After briefly attending Green River Community College, Fewing played for two seasons as a member of the University of Washington Huskies team from 1983 to 1984. He spent most of his freshman season as a substitute player, but broke away to become a regular starter under coach Denny Buck as a goalscoring midfielder.

Fewing then entered professional soccer and spent six seasons with FC Seattle Storm of the Western Soccer Alliance from 1985 to 1990, appearing in more matches than any other player for the club. Fewing described his performances with the Storm as being "very average", noting that he was "never a key, star player". He later played several games for the indoor team Everett BigFoot in 1995.

== Managerial career ==
Fewing began coaching youth soccer while playing for the Storm, establishing an annual local soccer camp in 1981 and taking several teams to national tournaments in the 1980s. After a failed tryout with the Tacoma Stars, he accepted an offer to coach the Seattle University Chieftains in 1988, taking over a program that had a losing record in eight consecutive seasons. Fewing led the Chieftains to a winning record in his second season as coach and was named NAIA Division I coach of the year in 1991. The Chieftains won their first national championship in 1997 under Fewing, defeating the Rockhurst Hawks in the NAIA Men's Soccer Championship after going undefeated in 27 matches.

The Chieftains, renamed the Redhawks, became an NCAA Division II program in 2000 and joined the Pacific West Conference alongside rivals Seattle Pacific University, coached by Cliff McCrath. In addition to earning winning records in Division II, the Redhawks also played in non-conference matches against NCAA Division I teams and won upsets over the Washington Huskies and Portland Pilots in 2003. Fewing led the team to an undefeated season in 2004, amassing 22 wins and one draw on their way to an NCAA Division II championship. Fewing was named the NCAA Division II National Coach of the Year, Far West Region Coach of the Year, and Great Northwest Athletic Conference Coach of the Year for the team's performance in 2004.

In February 2006, Fewing announced his resignation from the Redhawks after 18 seasons as head coach, due to a disagreement with the university's athletic director over payments for assistant coaches and other issues. The athletic director resigned a month later, but Fewing declined to return to the program and was replaced by Brad Agoos. Fewing devoted more time to his youth soccer camps, including the development of a new youth soccer facility in North Bend that attracted controversy due to alleged preferential treatment by the county government.

Fewing joined the broadcasting team for Seattle Sounders FC, a new Major League Soccer franchise, for their inaugural season in 2009 as a television and radio analyst. He was an assistant coach for the Tacoma Tide of the Premier Development League and served as a youth coach for Washington Crossfire alongside his broadcasting duties. Fewing was named the executive director of the Seattle chapter of America SCORES, a literacy and sports organization, shortly after leaving the Redhawks. Fewing also co-authored a book, Coaching Principles for the Development of Championship Teams, with assistant coach Herbert L. Hoffman.

Fewing was hired in November 2009 as the head coach of the Kitsap Pumas of the Premier Development League on a two-season contract. In his two seasons with the Pumas, he led the team to a 32–6–5 record and won the league championship in 2011. The Pumas also reached the third round of the U.S. Open Cup, where the team lost to the Sounders—his other employer. During the Open Cup match, Fewing prepared materials for the broadcasting team but did not participate in commentary. Fewing declined to continue as coach of the Pumas due to the commute and his broadcasting duties.

Fewing returned to the Redhawks in 2012 after reconciling with the team after their dispute over paying of assistant coaches. The team won its first Division I title in 2013 and has enjoyed several successful seasons since his return. Fewing earned his 300th win as head coach at the collegiate level in October 2018. Fewing was awarded a Golden Scarf by the Sounders in 2010 and was inducted into the Washington Youth Soccer Hall of Fame in 2019. He stepped down as head coach in April 2023 and became the associate athletic director for special projects at Seattle University.

== Personal life ==
Fewing is a Catholic and was a youth minister, while his brother is a priest. He lives with his wife, Patty, in the Ballard neighborhood of Seattle, where they also raised two sons and one daughter. Fewing has also officiated several weddings for former Redhawks players.
