= Cadet Soccer Stadium =

Soccer stadium at the United States Air Force Academy

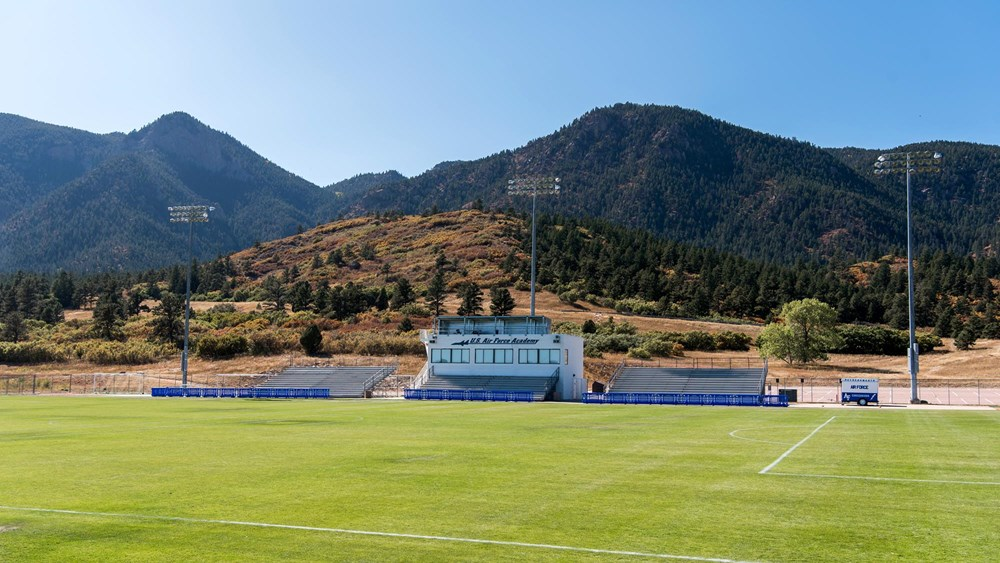

- Location in Colorado Location in the United States
- Location: Colorado Springs, Colorado
- Coordinates: 39°0′52″N 104°53′34″W
- Owner: United States Air Force Academy
- Capacity: 3,000 (2,000 seated)
- Surface: Kentucky Bluegrass

Construction
- Groundbreaking: May 1995
- Opened: August 29, 1995
- Expanded: 1998 (expanded and upgraded); 2003 (installed permanent lights)

Tenants
- Air Force Falcons men's soccer (NCAA) (1995–present); Air Force Falcons women's soccer (NCAA) (1995–present)

Cadet Soccer Stadium is a soccer-specific stadium in Colorado Springs, Colorado, on the grounds of the United States Air Force Academy. It is home to the Air Force Falcons men's and women's soccer teams.

== History ==
The stadium was built in 1995 with a capacity of 1,000. In 1998, it was upgraded and expanded to a capacity of 2,000 in order to host NCAA tournament games. In 2003, permanent lights were added to the stadium.

== Important Matches ==
Date	Opponent	Score	Note
September 3, 1995	Regis (W)	0-2	First women's game
November 22, 1997	Creighton	2-3 2OT	NCAA Tournament First Round
November 15, 2018	Central Arkansas	4-0	NCAA Tournament First Round
