= Air Force Falcons men's soccer =

American college soccer team

Air Force Falcons
- Founded: 1956; 69 years ago
- University: United States Air Force Academy
- Head coach: Greg Dalby (2nd season)
- Conference: MW
- Location: Air Force Academy, Colorado
- Stadium: Cadet Soccer Stadium (Capacity: 1,000)
- Nickname: Falcons
- Colors: Blue and silver
Home	Away

NCAA Tournament Quarterfinals
- 1968, 1993

NCAA Tournament Round of 16
- 1964, 1965, 1969, 1972, 1977, 1985, 1993, 2018

NCAA Tournament Round of 32
- 1964, 1965, 1968, 1969, 1972, 1977, 1985, 1992, 1993, 1997, 2018

NCAA Tournament appearances
- 1964, 1965, 1968, 1969, 1972, 1977, 1985, 1992, 1993, 1997, 2012, 2017, 2018, 2020

Conference Tournament championships
- 2012, 2020

Conference Regular Season championships
- 2018

The Air Force Falcons men's soccer program represents the United States Air Force Academy in all NCAA Division I men's college soccer competitions. The Falcons' first season was in 1956, two years after the Academy was established. As of the upcoming 2026 NCAA men's soccer season, the Falcons compete in their primary home of the Mountain West Conference, which is establishing a new men's soccer league. They had previously competed as affiliate members of the Western Athletic Conference since the 2013 season. They are coached by Greg Dalby, with Clint Long and Christian Madrigal as assistants. Air Force plays its home matches at Cadet Soccer Stadium.

== NCAA Tournament history ==
The team has qualified for 14 NCAA tournaments. Their best performances came in 1968 and 1993, where they reached the quarterfinals.

Season	Round	Opponent	Score
1964	First round	San Jose State	L 3–5
1965	First round	San Francisco	L 2–3
1968	First round	bye	
1968	Second round	San Francisco	W 3–2
1968	Quarterfinals	San Jose State	L 0–1
1969	First round	bye	
1969	Second round	San Jose State	L 0–1
1972	First round	bye	
1972	Second round	Ohio	L 2–3
1977	First round	bye	
1977	Second round	San Francisco	L 1–2
1985	First round	bye	
1985	Second round	SMU	L 1–2
1992	First round	SMU	L 1–4
1993	First round	Creighton	W 2–1
1993	Second round	North Carolina	W 2–1
1993	Quarterfinals	South Carolina	L 0–6
1997	First round	Creighton	L 2–3
2012	First round	Washington	L 0–1
2017	First round	Virginia Tech	L 0–2
2018	First round Second round Third round	Central Arkansas; Denver; Indiana	W 4–0; W 2–1; L 0–2
2020	Second round	Seton Hall	TBD

== Coaching history ==
Air Force has had 13 coaches in its program's existence.

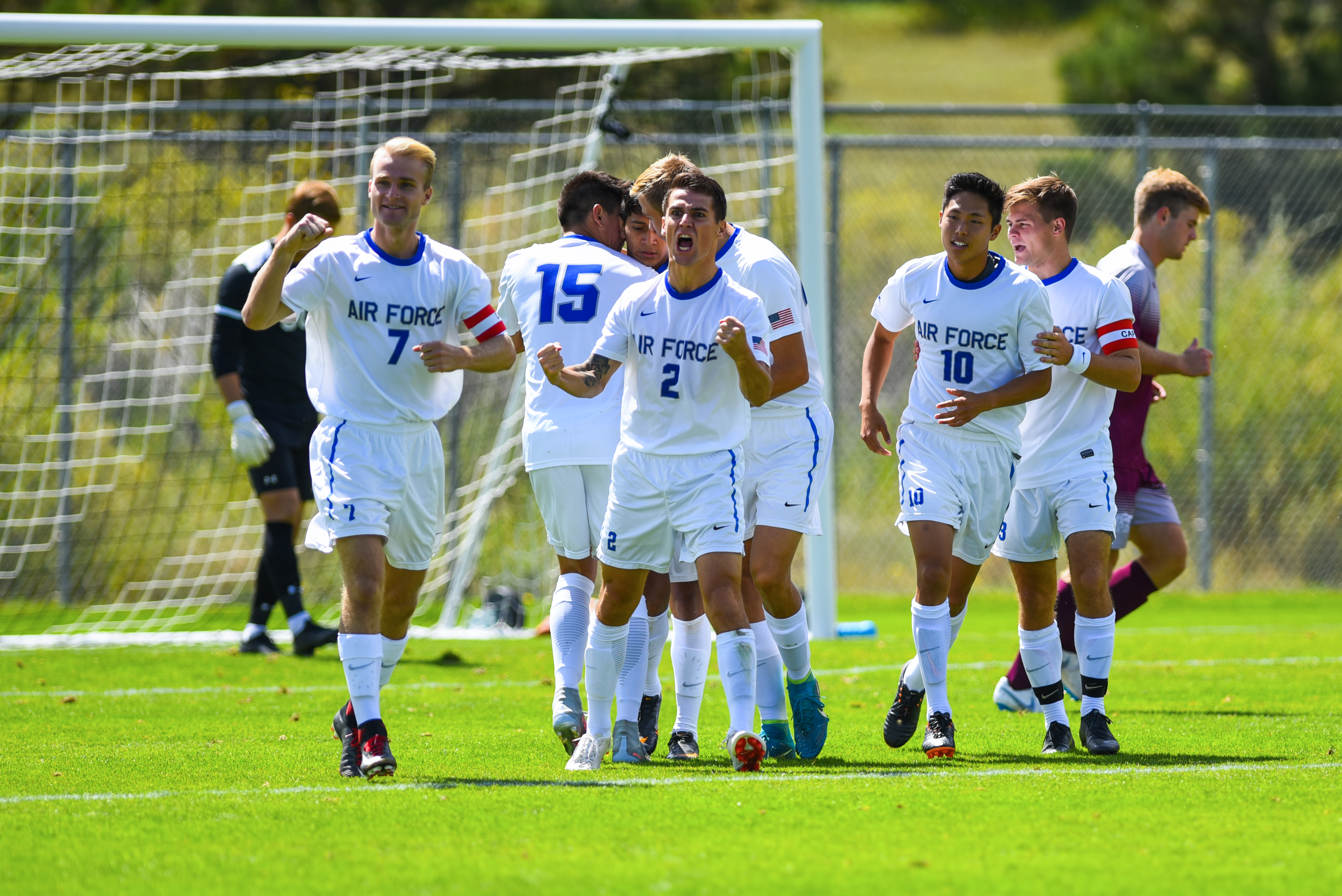
The Falcons celebrating a goal in 2018

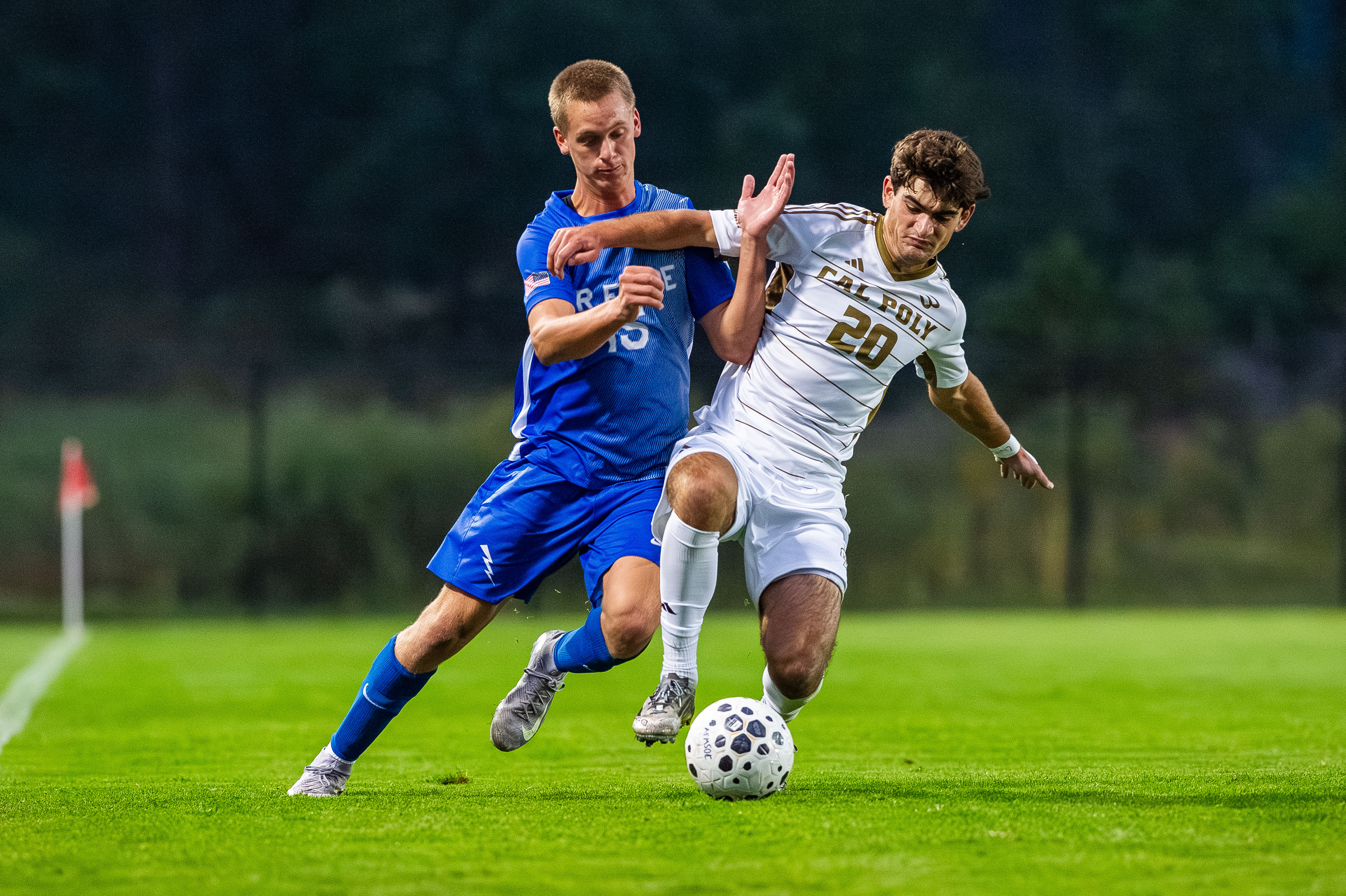
Falcons (blue kit) v Cal Poly match, 2025

Years	Coach	Overall					Conf.				
Years	Coach	GP	W	L	T	Pct.	GP	W	L	T	Pct.
1956	Anthony Biernacki	9	5	1	3	.658	6	4	1	1	.750
1957–1961	Arne Arnesen	47	31	9	7	.734	32	24	3	5	.828
1962–1963	Robert Strickland	21	11	9	1	.548	11	8	2	1	.773
1964–1966	Carmen Anillo	31	17	12	2	.581	13	11	1	1	.885
1967	John Loewenberg	11	5	6	0	.455	3	1	2	0	.333
1968–1973	Hank Eichin	84	54	26	4	.667	34	30	2	2	.912
1974–1975	Jim Thames	25	13	10	2	.560	11	8	3	0	.727
1976–1977	Rob Judas	27	16	9	2	.630	10	10	0	0	1.000
1978	Dan Ulmer	16	7	8	1	.469	6	4	2	0	.667
1979–2006	Lou Sagastume	513	282	188	43	.592	164	94	59	11	.607
2007–2023	Doug Hill	302	134	139	29	.489	155	73	66	16	.500
2024	Kevin Doyle	17	1	15	1	.093	7	1	6	0	.111
2025	Greg Dalby	17	1	13	3	.147	7	0	6	1	.071
Totals		1122	579	445	98	.560	468	277	153	38	.632

Last updated: December 20, 2025

== Stadium ==
Air Force plays its home games at Cadet Soccer Stadium. It has played select matches at Cadet Lacrosse Stadium.

== Titles ==
=== Conference ===
- MPSF tournament (1): 2012
- WAC tournament (1): 2020
