= UNLV Rebels men's soccer =

Soccer team representing the University of Las Vegas, Nevada

- Founded: 1974; 52 years ago
- University: University of Nevada, Las Vegas
- Head coach: BJ Craig
- Conference: Mountain West
- Location: Paradise, Nevada, US
- Stadium: Memorial Soccer Field (capacity: 2,500)
- Nickname: Rebels
- Colors: Scarlet and gray
Home	Away

NCAA tournament Round of 16
- 1983, 1985, 1987

NCAA tournament appearances
- 1983, 1984, 1985, 1987, 1988, 2014, 2016

Conference tournament championships
- 2016

The UNLV Rebels men's soccer team represents the University of Nevada, Las Vegas in all NCAA Division I men's college soccer competitions. The Rebels currently compete in the Western Athletic Conference, but will leave after the 2025 season when UNLV's primary athletic home of the Mountain West Conference launches a men's soccer league.

== Individual honors ==
=== All-Americans ===
Player	Position	Year	Team
Robbie Ryerson	FW	1985	First-Team
Danny Barber	MF	1991	Third-Team
Sal Bernal	FW	2013	Second-Team
Sal Bernal	FW	2014	Third-Team

=== All-Region ===
Player	Position	Year	Team
Robbie Ryerson	FW	1983	First-Team
Robbie Ryerson	FW	1984	First-Team
Richie Ryerson	MF	1984	Second-Team
Rob Moreland	DF	1984	First-Team

== Current roster ==
Note: Flags indicate national team as defined under FIFA eligibility rules; some limited exceptions apply. Players may hold more than one non-FIFA nationality.

No.	Pos.	Nation	Player
0	GK	USA	Andrew Sway
00	GK	USA	Miguel Duenas Jr.
1	GK	GER	Lukas Betz
2	DF	USA	Gabriel Claudio
3	FW	FRA	Nicolas Likulia
4	FW	USA	Marco Gonzalez
5	DF	NZL	Billy Jones
6	MF	GER	Nico Clasen
7	MF	USA	Jesus Partida
8	DF	GER	Louis Hiepen
9	FW	AUS	Aedon Kyra
11	FW	USA	Hayden Prasad
12	MF	COL	Juan Jose Becerra
13	FW	USA	Skyler Goo

No.	Pos.	Nation	Player
14	MF	USA	Bailey Letherman
15	FW	USA	Tucker Fenton
16	MF	USA	Chilo Sanchez
17	DF	ENG	Matthew Ridley
18	DF	USA	Nick Williams
19	FW	NED	Lateef Omidiji Jr.
20	DF	USA	Sam Wren
21	MF	USA	Diego Zacarias
24	FW	USA	Nicholas Bianchi
25	MF	UGA	Becca Rice
