= United Athletic Conference softball tournament =

Western Athletic Conference softball tournament
- Conference softball championship
- Sport: Softball
- Conference: United Athletic Conference
- Number of teams: 8
- Format: Double-elimination tournament
- Played: 1991–present
- Last contest: 2026
- Current champion: California Baptist (1)
- Most championships: Grand Canyon; New Mexico State (4)

Host stadiums
- Tarleton Softball Complex (2026); John C. Funk Stadium (2025); Logan Field at SU Park (2014, 2016, 2021, 2024); GCU Softball Stadium (2019, 2023); Bearkat Softball Stadium (2022); NM State Softball Complex (2010, 2012, 2015, 2017–18); Lady Techster Softball Complex (2013); Rainbow Wahine Softball Stadium (2008); Bulldog Diamond (1999, 2006–07, 2009, 2011); Cottonwood Complex (1992); Seymour Smith Stadium (1991)

Host locations
- Stephenville, TX (2026); Riverside, CA (2025); Seattle, WA (2014, 2016, 2021, 2024); Phoenix, AZ (2019, 2023); Huntsville, TX (2022); Las Cruces, NM (2010, 2012, 2015, 2017–18); Ruston, LA (2013); Honlulu, HI (2008); Fresno, CA (1999, 2006–07, 2009, 2011]] Salt Lake City, UT (1992); Omaha, NE (1991)

The United Athletic Conference softball tournament (sometimes known simply as the UAC Tournament or United Tournament) is the conference championship tournament in college softball for the United Athletic Conference. It is the successor to the Western Athletic Conference softball tournament, first held at the end of the 1991 season by the conference when it was known as the Western Athletic Conference (WAC). The 2025 edition was the last held under the WAC name, as the conference adopted the UAC name in July 2026. The winner receives the United's automatic bid to the NCAA Division I softball tournament.

== Format ==
During periods when the WAC had more than eight softball members (the United currently has eight members), the top eight teams based on winning percentage from the round-robin regular season competed in the double-elimination tournament. The number of teams in the field has varied throughout the history of the event as the size of the conference has changed.

== Champions ==
=== Year-by-year ===
Year	School	Venue	Most Outstanding Player
1991	Utah	Seymour Smith Stadium • Omaha, NE	Kelly Brookhart, Creighton
1992	Utah	Cottonwood Complex • Salt Lake City, UT	Janet Womack, Utah
1999	Fresno State	Bulldog Diamond • Fresno, CA	Amanda Scott, Fresno State
2006	Nevada	Bulldog Diamond • Fresno, CA	Jordan McPherson, Nevada
2007	Fresno State	Bulldog Diamond • Fresno, CA	Robin Mackin, Fresno State
2008	Louisiana Tech	Rainbow Wahine Softball Stadium • Honlulu, HI	Krissi Oliver, Louisiana Tech
2009	Fresno State	Bulldog Diamond • Fresno, CA	Morgan Mellow, Fresno State
2010	Hawaii	NM State Softball Complex • Las Cruces, NM	Kelly Majam, Hawaii
2011	New Mexico State	Bulldog Diamond • Fresno, CA	Valerie Swedburg, New Mexico State
2012	BYU	NM State Softball Complex • Las Cruces, NM	Stacie Toney, BYU
2013	San Jose State	Lady Techster Softball Complex • Ruston, LA	Amanda Pridmore, San Diego State
2014	Utah Valley	Logan Field at SU Park • Seattle, WA	Josi Summers, Utah Valley
2015	New Mexico State	NM State Softball Complex • Las Cruces, NM	Emma Adams, New Mexico State
2016	Cal State Bakersfield	Logan Field at SU Park • Seattle, WA	Sydney Raeber, Cal State Bakersfield
2017	New Mexico State	NM State Softball Complex • Las Cruces, NM	Rachel Rodriguez, New Mexico State
2018	New Mexico State	NM State Softball Complex • Las Cruces, NM	Kelsey Horton, New Mexico State
2019	Seattle	GCU Softball Stadium • Phoenix, AZ	Carley Nance, Seattle
2021	Seattle	Logan Field at SU Park • Seattle, WA	Carley Nance, Seattle
2022	Grand Canyon	Bearkat Softball Stadium • Huntsville, TX	Ariel Thompson, Grand Canyon
2023	Grand Canyon	GCU Softball Stadium • Phoenix, AZ	Kayla Rodgers, Grand Canyon
2024	Grand Canyon	Logan Field at SU Park • Seattle, WA	Ashley Trierweiler, Grand Canyon
2025	Grand Canyon	John C. Funk Stadium • Riverside, CA	Emily Gonzalez, Grand Canyon
2026	California Baptist	Tarleton Softball Complex • Stephenville, TX	Makayla Medellin, California Baptist

=== By school ===
No current UAC member has won the tournament. When the WAC adopted the UAC name in 2026, only three schools—Abilene Christian, Tarleton State, and UT Arlington—remained conference members through the transition. They were joined by new members Austin Pray, Central Arkansas, Eastern Kentucky, North Alabama, and West Georgia. All had a previous relationship with the pre-2026 WAC; they arrived from the Atlantic Sun Conference, which along with the WAC operated a football-only UAC from 2023–2025 with those five schools participating.

School	Championships	Years
Grand Canyon	4	2022, 2023, 2024, 2025
New Mexico State	4	2011, 2015, 2017, 2018
Fresno State	3	1999, 2007, 2009
Seattle	2	2019, 2021
Utah	2	1991, 1992
BYU	1	2012
California Baptist	1	2026
Cal State Bakersfield	1	2016
Hawaii	1	2010
Louisiana Tech	1	2008
Nevada	1	2006
San Jose State	1	2013
Utah Valley	1	2014
