= Hannah Lee (footballer) =

Nicaraguan footballer (born 2000)

Personal information
- Full name: Hannah Rose Lee Flores
- Birth name: Hannah Rose Lee
- Date of birth: 28 October 2000 (age 26)
- Place of birth: Madison, South Dakota, U.S.
- Height: 1.60 m (5 ft 3 in)
- Position: Midfielder

Team information
- Current team: Kifisia WFC

Youth career
- Murray Spartans

College career
Years	Team	Apps	(Gls)
2019–2021	Salt Lake Bruins	31	(16)
2022–2023	Utah Valley Wolverines	28	(5)

Senior career*
Years	Team	Apps	(Gls)
2024	Santos	2	(0)
2024–2025	Santa Fé	4	(2)
2025–	Kifisia		

International career^{‡}
2023–	Nicaragua	3	(0)
- * Club domestic league appearances and goals as of 17 July 2025 ‡ National team caps and goals as of 00:57, 10 March 2024 (UTC)

Hannah Rose Lee Flores (born 28 October 2000) is a professional footballer who plays as a midfielder for Greek club Kifisia WFC. Born in the United States, she plays for the Nicaragua national team.

== Early life and amateur career ==
Born in Madison, South Dakota to an American father and a Nicaraguan mother, Lee attended Murray High School, earning First Team All-State and First Team All-Region honours in her three consecutive seasons at the school. In 2019, she started playing college soccer for the Salt Lake Community College Bruins.

In June 2021, Lee was included in the National Junior College Athletic Association All-Tournament Team for the 2020 season, being the only sophomore amongst the SLCC players included. She moved to the Utah Valley University in 2021, being redshirted in her first year at the university but later playing for the Utah Valley Wolverines in 2022.

== Club career ==
Lee played club football for La Roca FC and Murray FC during high school. On 8 March 2024, she signed a one-year contract with Campeonato Brasileiro de Futebol Feminino Série A1 side Santos FC, following the footsteps of Reina Bonta, Jourdan Ziff and Olivia McDaniel, all American-born footballers who joined the club in the previous years.

Lee made her professional debut on 29 March 2024, coming on as a first-half substitute for Maria Alves in a 2–0 home loss to Red Bull Bragantino. On 25 June, after just one further league appearance, she rescinded her contract with the Sereias.

== International career ==
Lee made her international debut with the Nicaragua women's national team on 29 November 2023, starting in a 2–1 home win over Honduras for the 2024 CONCACAF W Gold Cup qualification. She also played in the last round against El Salvador as her nation were knocked out of the qualifiers, and featured in a 4–0 friendly loss to Brazil on 6 December.

== International goals ==
Scores and results list Nicaragua's goal tally first

No.	Date	Venue	Opponent	Score	Result	Competition .
1.	18 April 2026	Estadio Nacional, Managua, Nicaragua	Dominica	3–0	14–0	2026 CONCACAF W Championship qualification

== Honours ==
Salt Lake Bruins

- Scenic West Athletic Conference Tournament: 2020–21
- NJCAA DI Women's Soccer Championship; runner-up: 2020–21

Utah Valley Wolverines

- WAC Regular Season: 2022, 2023
- WAC Tournament; runner-up: 2022

Santa Fé

- Panamanian First Division: Clausura 2024
