= United Athletic Conference women's soccer tournament =

United Athletic women's soccer tournament
- Conference soccer championship
- Sport: College soccer
- Conference: United Athletic Conference
- Number of teams: 6
- Format: Single-elimination
- Current stadium: UCCU Stadium
- Current location: Orem, Utah
- Played: 1995–present
- Last contest: 2026
- Current champion: Abilene Christian (1st title)
- Most championships: SMU (6 titles)
- Official website: uacsports.com/wsoc

The United Athletic Conference women's soccer tournament, formerly the Western Athletic Conference (WAC) tournament in 2026, is the conference championship tournament in women's soccer for the Western Athletic Conference. In July 2026, the WAC rebranded as the UAC, taking the name of a pre-existing football alliance between the WAC and Atlantic Sun Conference.

The tournament has been held every year since 1995. It is a single-elimination tournament with seeding based on conference records. The tournament field has been six teams for the entirety of its history. The winner, declared conference champion, receives the conference's automatic bid to the NCAA Division I women's soccer championship.

SMU is the most winning team of the competition, with six championships.

== Champions ==
Key

- (1) – Title number
- (a.e.t.) – Match went to extra time
- (p) – Match decided by a penalty shootout after extra time
- – Winning team also won regular season

=== By Year ===
Year	Champion	Score	Runner-up	Venue / city	MVP	Ref.
1995	San Diego State (1)	2–1	New Mexico	SDSU Sports Deck • San Diego, CA	Laurie Hegedorn, New Mexico	
1996	BYU (1)	3–2	San Diego State	South Field • Provo, UT	Shauna Rohbock, BYU	
1997	SMU (1)	2–0	BYU	Westcott Field • Dallas, TX	Kim Brown, SMU; Shauna Rohbock, BYU	
1998	San Diego State (2)	2–1 (a.e.t.)	BYU	South Field • Provo, UT	Maren Hendershot, BYU	
1999	SMU (2)	1–0 (a.e.t.)	Fresno State	Westcott Field • Dallas, TX	Nicole Lamb, SMU	
2000	San José State (1)	3–1	Tulsa	Fresno State Stadium • Fresno, CA	Kristina Jacob, San José State	
2001	SMU (3)	2–0	Hawai‘i	Westcott Field • Dallas, TX	Tara Comfort, SMU	
2002	SMU (4)	3–1	UTEP	Holloway Field • Houston, TX	Holly Cohen, UTEP	
2003	SMU (5)	2–1	Rice	Westcott Field • Dallas, TX	Kim Harvey, SMU	
2004	SMU (6)	2–0	Rice	Waipiʻo Peninsula Stadium • Honolulu, HI	Olivia O’Rear, SMU	
2005	Fresno State (1)	1–0	San José State	Boas Soccer Complex • Boise, Idaho	Kortney Lewis, Fresno State	
2006	Nevada (1)	0–0 (4–2 p)	Fresno State	Mackay Stadium • Reno, NV	Caitlin Holmes, Nevada	
2007	Hawai‘i (1)	1–0	Fresno State	Boas Soccer Complex • Boise, ID	Chelsea Deptula, Hawai‘i	
2008	Fresno State (2)	2–1 (a.e.t.)	Utah State	Mackay Stadium • Reno, NV	Ali Sill, Fresno State	
2009	Boise State (1)	1–0	Nevada	Boas Soccer Complex • Boise, ID	Erica Parks, Boise State	
2010	Fresno State (3)	0–0 (3–1 p)	San José State	Robert Mack Caruthers Field • Ruston, LA	Katie Lee, Fresno State	
2011	Utah State (1)	1–0	Fresno State	Fresno State Stadium • Fresno, CA	Molli Merrill, Utah State	
2012	Utah State (2)	1–0	Denver	Bell Soccer Field • Logan, UT	Natalie Norris, Utah State	
2013	Seattle (1)	3–0	Kansas City	NM State Complex • Las Cruces, NM	Monique Escalera, Seattle U	
2014	Seattle (2)	5–0	Kansas City	Championship Field • Seattle, WA	Stephanie Verdoia, Seattle	
2015	Utah Valley (1)	2–0	Seattle	Main Soccer Field • Bakersfield, CA	Jessica Duffin, Utah Valley	
2016	Seattle (3)	2–1	Kansas City	Durwood Soccer Stadium • Kansas City, MO	Natasha Howe, Seattle	
2017	Utah Valley (2)	1–1 (3–1 p)	Seattle	GCU Stadium • Phoenix, AZ	Breanna DeWaal, Utah Valley	
2018	Seattle (4)	1–0	Kansas City	Clyde Field • Orem, UT	Ariana Romero, Seattle	
2019	Seattle (5)	2–1 (a.e.t.)	Utah Valley	Championship Field • Seattle, WA	Jessie Ray, Seattle	
2020	Utah Valley (3)	1–0	Seattle	GCU Stadium • Phoenix, AZ	Cassidy McCormick, Utah Valley	
2021	Grand Canyon (1)	3–0	Utah Valley	Elmer Gray Stadium • Abilene, TX	Lindsey Prokop, Grand Canyon	
2022	New Mexico State (1)	1–0	Utah Valley	Championship Field • Seattle, WA	Makenna Gottschalk, New Mexico State	
2023	Grand Canyon (2)	4–2	Seattle	CBU Soccer Field • Riverside, CA	Gianna Gourley, Grand Canyon	
2024	California Baptist (1)	3–2	Grand Canyon	Elmer Gray Stadium • Abilene, TX	Jayden Ramirez, California Baptist	
2025	California Baptist (2)	2–2 (4–3 p)	Utah Valley	UCCU Stadium • Orem, UT	Mikayla O'Brien, Cal Baptist	
2026	Abilene Christian (1)	3–1	Eastern Kentucky	Bill Stephens Soccer Complex • Conway, AR	Gracie Kelly, Abilene Christian	

=== By school ===
As of 2026 tournament

School	W	L	T	Pct.	Finals	Titles	Winning years
Abilene Christian	2	1	0	.667	1	1	2026
Air Force	0	1	0	.000	0	0	—
Austin Peay	0	1	0	.000	0	0	—
Boise State	5	6	1	.458	1	1	2009
BYU	8	3	0	.727	3	1	1996
Cal State Bakersfield	1	3	2	.333	0	0	—
California Baptist	3	2	2	.571	2	2	2024, 2025
Central Arkansas	0	0	1	.500	0	0	—
Chicago State	0	1	0	.000	0	0	—
Denver	1	1	0	.500	1	0	—
Eastern Kentucky	0	1	1	.250	1	0	—
Fresno State	16	13	3	.547	7	3	2005, 2008, 2010
Grand Canyon	8	5	1	.607	3	2	2021, 2023
Hawai‘i	4	8	1	.346	2	1	2007
Idaho	1	4	0	.200	0	0	–
Lamar	1	1	0	.500	0	0	—
Little Rock	0	0	0	–	0	0	—
Louisiana Tech	0	2	0	.000	0	0	—
Kansas City	7	7	0	.500	4	0	—
Nevada	6	4	1	.591	2	1	2006
New Mexico	1	3	0	.250	1	0	—
New Mexico State	6	8	0	.429	1	1	2022
North Alabama	0	1	1	.250	0	0	—
Rice	4	4	0	.500	2	0	—
Sam Houston	0	1	0	.000	0	0	—
San Diego State	7	1	0	.875	3	2	1995, 1998
San José State	8	10	2	.450	3	1	2000
Seattle	18	5	2	.760	10	5	2013, 2014, 2016, 2018, 2019
SMU	14	3	0	.824	6	6	1997, 1999, 2001, 2002, 2003, 2004
Southern Utah	0	1	0	.000	0	0	—
Stephen F. Austin	0	1	0	.000	0	0	—
Tarleton State	1	1	1	.500	0	0	—
TCU	0	3	0	.000	0	0	—
Texas State	1	1	0	.500	0	0	—
Tulsa	2	7	1	.250	1	0	—
Utah	0	2	0	.000	0	0	—
Utah State	6	6	0	.500	3	2	2011, 2012
Utah Tech	0	3	1	.125	0	0	—
Utah Valley	13	9	2	.583	7	3	2015, 2017, 2020
UTEP	3	4	1	.438	1	0	—
UT Rio Grande Valley	0	5	2	.143	0	0	—
West Georgia	0	0	0	–	0	0	—
Wyoming	0	1	0	.000	0	0	—

Teams in italics no longer sponsor women's soccer in the WAC/UAC, as of the 2026 season.
