= Ruby Hladek =

American soccer player (born 2003)

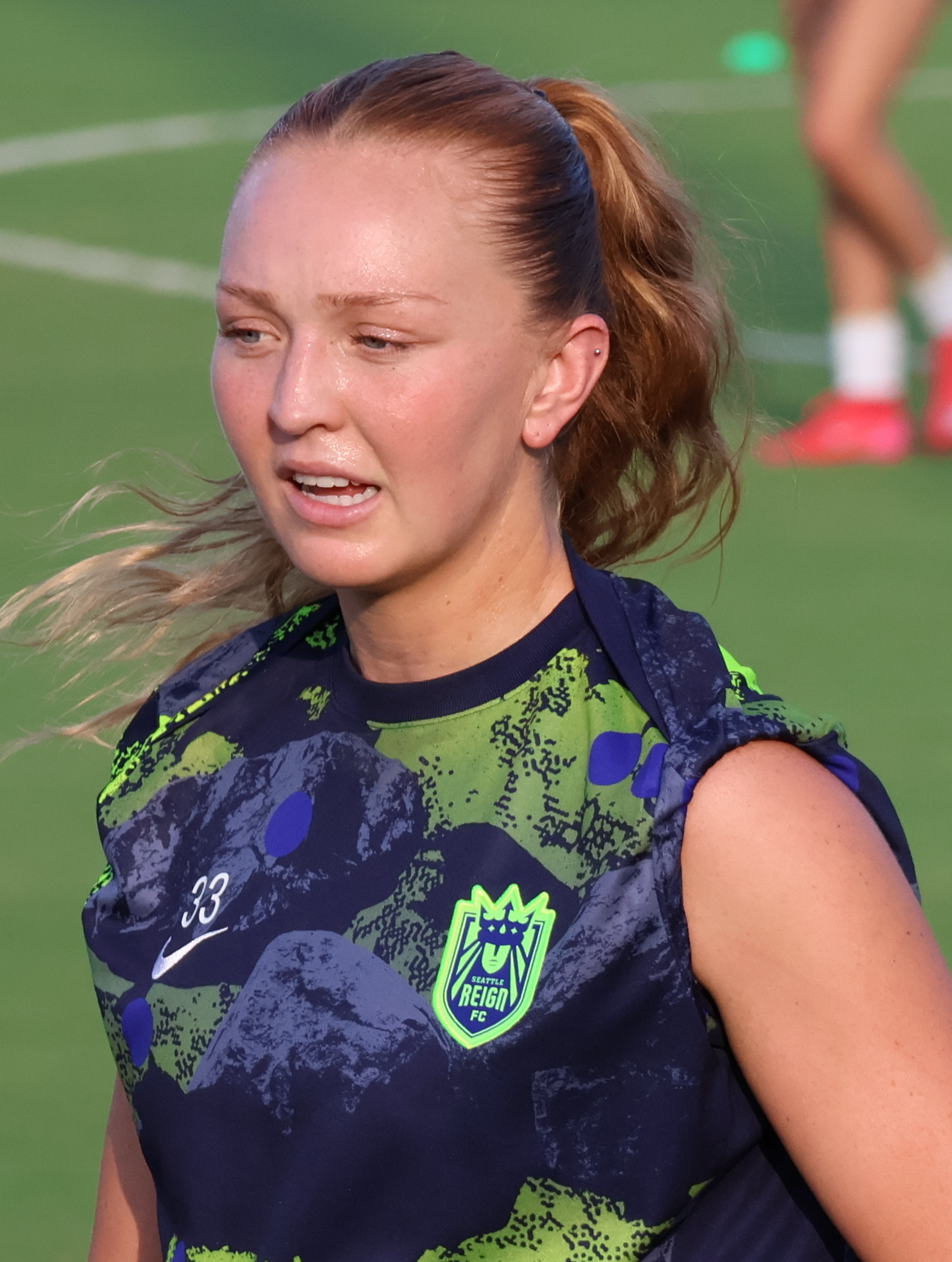
- Hladek with the Seattle Reign in 2026

Personal information
- Date of birth: January 5, 2003 (age 23)
- Height: 5 ft 7 in (1.70 m)
- Position: Forward

Team information
- Current team: Seattle Reign
- Number: 33

Youth career
- SoCal Blues

College career
Years	Team	Apps	(Gls)
2021–2022	BYU Cougars	17	(0)
2023–2025	Utah Valley Wolverines	60	(24)

Senior career*
Years	Team	Apps	(Gls)
2025	Utah United	13	(7)
2026–	Seattle Reign	2	(0)
- * Club domestic league appearances and goals as of 16:33, November 8, 2026 (UTC)

Ruby Hladek (born January 5, 2003) is an American professional soccer player who plays as a forward for Seattle Reign FC of the National Women's Soccer League (NWSL). She played college soccer for the BYU Cougars and the Utah Valley Wolverines, setting the program record for career assists with the latter.

== Early life ==
Hladek grew up in Ladera Ranch, California, as one of four children born to Tony and Ashley Hladek. She played club soccer for the SoCal Blues, contributing to a 50-game unbeaten streak across 3 years. In 2020, she helped the Blues become the top-ranked under-17 youth team in the nation. The following year, she was a member of the Blues squad that won both ECNL regional and national titles. The Hladek family then moved to Utah after the COVID-19 pandemic broke out. As a senior at American Fork High School, Hladek was named to the All-State first team and lifted her new school to a regional championship.

== College career ==
=== BYU Cougars ===
After making one appearance for the BYU Cougars in her freshman year at college, Hladek redshirted for the remainder of the season. She watched on from the sidelines as the Cougars won the West Coast Conference and advanced to its first NCAA National Championship match in program history. The following year in 2022, Hladek made 16 appearances for BYU and notched 2 assists. She entered the NCAA transfer portal at the end of the season.

=== Utah Valley Wolverines ===
Upon arriving to Utah Valley University in 2023, Hladek became an immediate starter for the Wolverines. Over the next three seasons, she started in all 60 of Utah Valley's matches, earned three consecutive WAC All-Tournament honors, and contributed to three straight Western Athletic Conference (WAC) titles. In her first year as a Wolverine, she recorded 4 goals and a team-leading 9 assists. In the semifinals of the WAC tournament, she netted Utah Valley's lone goal in a semifinal defeat to Grand Canyon. The following season, she earned spots on the All-WAC first team and All-Region second teams. She scored 5 goals, one of which was in a postseason knockout fixture against California Baptist on November 6, 2024.

In the offseason before her final year of college, Hladek played for pre-professional club Utah United in the team's inaugural season as a member of the USL W League. By the penultimate match of the season, she had scored 6 goals in 12 matches despite only starting in half of her appearances. In the 2025 USL W League championship match, Hladek scored a goal as Utah United beat the North Carolina Courage U23, 4–0, to secure the title.

In 2025, Hladek concluded her collegiate career with career highs of 22 appearances, 15 goals, and a conference-leading 13 assists. She had two multi-goal games, including a 5–3 victory over Gonzaga on September 9 in which she registered two goals and an assist. She earned multiple accolades at the end of the season, including first-team All-WAC, first-team All-Region, and WAC Offensive Player of the Year. She departed from Utah Valley having set the program record in career assists, with a total of 32.

== Club career ==
Hladek joined National Women's Soccer League (NWSL) club Seattle Reign FC as a non-rostered trialist in the 2026 preseason. On March 12, 2026, the Reign announced that they had signed Hladek to her first professional contract, a short-term deal through June. When it expired, she signed a two-month extension through August. Hladek made her professional debut on July 18, coming on as a 90th-minute substitute for Maddie Mercado in a 3–2 loss to Gotham FC. In August 2026, the Reign extended Hladek's contract once again, this time through the end of the year.

== Honors and awards ==
BYU Cougars

- West Coast Conference: 2021

Utah Valley Wolverines

- Western Athletic Conference: 2023, 2024, 2025

Utah United

- USL W League: 2025

Individual

- WAC Offensive Player of the Year: 2025
- First-team All-WAC: 2024, 2025
- WAC tournament all-tournament team: 2023, 2024, 2025
