= 2020 Grand Canyon Antelopes men's soccer team =

American college soccer season

2020 Grand Canyon Antelopes men's soccer

WAC regular season champions

NCAA Tournament, Second round
- Conference: Western Athletic Conference
- U. Soc. Coaches poll: No. 16
- Record: 8–2–0 (7–0–0 WAC)
- Head coach: Schellas Hyndman (6th season)
- Assistant coaches: Tim McClements (2nd season); Vlastimir Davidovic (3rd season)
- Home stadium: GCU Stadium

2020 Western Athletic Conference men's soccer standings
	Conf.					Overall
Team	W		L		T	W		L		T
No. 25 Grand Canyon +	7	–	0	–	0	8	–	2	–	0
UTRGV	6	–	1	–	2	6	–	2	–	2
San Jose State	5	–	1	–	2	5	–	1	–	3
California Baptist ^{#}	5	–	4	–	1	6	–	4	–	2
UNLV	4	–	4	–	2	4	–	5	–	2
Seattle	4	–	2	–	1	6	–	4	–	1
Air Force ‡	4	–	4	–	1	6	–	5	–	2
Dixie State ^{#}	3	–	6	–	0	3	–	6	–	0
Utah Valley	2	–	4	–	0	3	–	4	–	0
Incarnate Word	2	–	7	–	0	2	–	7	–	0
Houston Baptist	0	–	9	–	1	0	–	9	–	2
Chicago State ¿	0	–	0	–	0	1	–	2	–	0
‡ – Conference tournament champion + – Also invited to the 2020 NCAA tournament # – Ineligible (In transition) ¿– Not competing in WAC until 2022; As of May 28, 2021; Rankings from United Soccer Coaches

The 2020 Grand Canyon men's soccer team represented Grand Canyon University during the 2020 NCAA Division I men's soccer season. It was the 36th season of the Grand Canyon men's soccer team.

== Effects of the Covid-19 Pandemic ==
On August 13, 2020, the Western Athletic Conference postponed all fall sports through the end of the calendar year.

On November 4, 2020, the NCAA approved a plan for college soccer to be played in the spring.

== Roster ==
Source: Note: Flags indicate national team as defined under FIFA eligibility rules; some limited exceptions apply. Players may hold more than one non-FIFA nationality.

No.	Pos.	Nation	Player
0	GK	(United States) USA	Ben Ogan
1	GK	(Cyprus) CYP	George Tasouris
2	MF	(United States) USA	Esay Easley
4	DF	(United States) USA	William Culhane
5	MF	(United States) USA	Alexis Canales
6	MF	(United States) USA	Mitch Stephens
7	FW	(South Africa) RSA	Marco Afonso
8	MF	(England) ENG	Charles Noyelle
9	FW	(England) ENG	Bert Wilton
10	MF	(England) ENG	Hugo Logan
11	FW	(United States) USA	Cameron Weller
12	MF	(United States) USA	Edgar Soto
13	MF	(United States) USA	Justin Rasmussen
14	DF	(United States) USA	Logan Guertin
15	DF	(United States) USA	Alec Labarge
16	DF	(United States) USA	Cameron Conaway

No.	Pos.	Nation	Player
17	DF	(United States) USA	Andrew Bebbington
18	MF	(United States) USA	Roger Sanguinetti
19	MF	(United States) USA	Tosh Yasuda
20	DF	(Spain) ESP	Alejandro Fernandez Alcaide
22	MF	(United States) USA	Will Clark
23	MF	(Iceland) ISL	Georg Bjarnason
25	MF	(Cyprus) CYP	Marios Andreou
26	DF	(United States) USA	Nick Barreiro
27	FW	(United States) USA	Rey Gaytan
29	DF	(United States) USA	Pedro Mondragon
30	GK	(Ghana) GHA	Calvin Kissi
32	MF	(Ecuador) ECU	Ariel Aguas
33	MF	(Germany) GER	Maximilian Moeller
44	GK	(United States) USA	Michael Haynes
66	MF	(United States) USA	Manuel Aranda
99	GK	(United States) USA	Anthony Munoz

== Matches ==
=== Preseason ===
January 27, 2021 Exhibition	Grand Canyon	9-0	Benedictine-Mesa	Phoenix, AZ
7:00 p.m. PT	Tosh Yasuda 13'; Maximilian Moeller 23', 36'; Marco Afonso 33', 42'; Calvin Kissi 49', 68'; Edgar Soto 78'; Justin Rasmussen 90'	Report		Stadium: GCU Stadium; Attendance: 267

January 28, 2021 Exhibition	Grand Canyon	5-1	Northwest Nazarene	Phoenix, AZ
7:00 p.m. PT	Tosh Yasuda 12', 48'; Esai Easley 22'; Calvin Kissi 64'; Andrew Bebbington 86'	Report	Danny Cuevas 77'	Stadium: GCU Stadium; Attendance: 245

January 30, 2021 Exhibition	Grand Canyon	1-2	Northwest Nazarene	Phoenix, AZ
7:00 p.m. PT	Justin Rasmussen 54'	Report	Cameron Natvig 65'; Nils Knosala 88'	Stadium: GCU Stadium; Attendance: 149

=== Regular season ===
February 20, 2021 Conference	Grand Canyon	2-1	Houston Baptist	Phoenix, AZ
7:00 p.m. PT	Maximilian Moeller 10'; Rey Gaytan 30'	Report	Bryant Farkarlun 17'	Stadium: GCU Stadium; Attendance: 0

February 27, 2021 Conference	San Jose State	2-1	Grand Canyon	San Jose, CA
8:00 p.m. PT	Nicolas Brenes 20'; Omar Lemus 49'	Report	Justin Rasmussen 15', 81' (pen.); Maximilian Moeller 89' (pen.)	Stadium: Spartan Soccer Field; Attendance: 0

March 6, 2021 Conference	Grand Canyon	1-0	Air Force	Phoenix, AZ
7:00 p.m. PT	Justin Rasmussen 48'	Report		Stadium: GCU Stadium; Attendance: 215

March 13, 2021 Conference	Incarnate Word	0-1	Grand Canyon	San Antonio, TX
6:00 p.m. PT		Report	Justin Rasmussen 23' (pen.)	Stadium: Gayle & Tom Benson Stadium; Attendance: 50

March 19, 2021 Conference	Grand Canyon	3-1	California Baptist	Phoenix, AZ
7:00 p.m. PT	Justin Rasmussen 13'; Marios Andreou 40'; Will Clark 41'	Report	Reuben Dass 65'	Stadium: GCU Stadium; Attendance: 264

March 26, 2021 Conference	Grand Canyon	5-1	Dixie State	Phoenix, AZ
7:00 p.m. PT	Pedro Mondragon 19'; Tosh Yasuda 28'; Maximilian Moeller 63', 65', 72'	Report	Idris Alabi 41' (pen.)	Stadium: GCU Stadium; Attendance: 0

April 5, 2021 Conference	Seattle	Cancelled	Grand Canyon	Seattle, WA
7:00 p.m. PT		Report		Stadium: Championship Field

April 10, 2021 Conference	UNLV	1-2	Grand Canyon	Paradise, NV
7:00 p.m. PT	Skyler Goo 61'	Report	Marios Andreou 74'; Hugo Logan 86'	Stadium: Peter F. Johann Memorial Soccer Field; Attendance: 50

=== Postseason ===
==== WAC Tournament ====
April 15, 2021 Semifinals	Grand Canyon	2-0	Seattle	Paradise, NV
11:00 a.m. PT	Maximilian Moeller 23'; Hugo Logan 80'	Report		Stadium: Peter F. Johann Memorial Soccer Field; Attendance: 100

April 15, 2021 Final	Grand Canyon	0-3	Air Force	Paradise, NV
1:00 p.m. PT		Report	London Aghedo 43'; Quinn Matulis 49'; Lathan Spadafora 83'	Stadium: Peter F. Johann Memorial Soccer Field; Attendance: 200

==== NCAA Tournament ====
May 2, 2021 Second round	Washington	2-0	Grand Canyon	Matthews, North Carolina
1:00 p.m. PT	Ryan Sailor 21'; Christian Soto 55'	Report		Stadium: Matthews Sportsplex; Attendance: 54
