= Heather Stainbrook =

American soccer player (born 2001)

- Stainbrook with the Dallas Trinity FC in 2026

Personal information
- Full name: Heather Marie Stainbrook
- Date of birth: March 14, 2001 (age 25)
- Height: 5 ft 4 in (1.63 m)
- Position: Midfielder

Team information
- Current team: Dallas Trinity (on loan from the Washington Spirit)
- Number: 7

College career
Years	Team	Apps	(Gls)
2019–2023	Utah Valley Wolverines	102	(40)

Senior career*
Years	Team	Apps	(Gls)
2024–	Washington Spirit	22	(1)
2026–	→ Dallas Trinity (loan)	11	(2)
- * Club domestic league appearances and goals as of 05:18, May 26, 2026 (UTC)

Heather Marie Stainbrook (born March 14, 2001) is an American professional soccer player who plays as a midfielder for USL Super League club Dallas Trinity, on loan from the Washington Spirit. She played college soccer for the Utah Valley Wolverines, setting the program scoring record at the time, and began her professional career with the Spirit in 2024.

== Early life ==
Stainbrook grew up in South Jordan, Utah, and attended Alta High School in Sandy. She was named all-state the two years she played for her high school as she led the team to regional titles and state quarterfinals. She played club soccer for La Roca FC.

== College career ==
Stainbrook was a five-year starter for the Utah Valley Wolverines from 2019 to 2023. In her pandemic-shortened sophomore year, she helped win both the Western Athletic Conference (WAC) regular-season and tournament titles; Utah Valley qualified for the NCAA tournament for only the third time in program history and won its opening match for the first time. She won two further regular-season conference titles with the team and appeared in one further NCAA tournament. Stainbrook received first-team All-WAC recognition three times and was named the WAC Offensive Player of the Year when she scored a career-high 13 goals in 2022. After five seasons, Stainbrook left Utah Valley as its all-time top scorer with 40 goals in 102 games. Her former teammate Faith Webber surpassed her record the following year.

== Club career ==
=== Washington Spirit ===
Stainbrook was not selected in the 2024 NWSL Draft but joined the Washington Spirit as a non-roster invitee in the preseason, signing a three-year contract on March 11, 2024. She made her professional debut as a late substitute for Ouleymata Sarr in a 4–2 win over the Chicago Red Stars on May 3, becoming the first Utah Valley player to play in the NWSL. In early October, following a season-ending injury to Andi Sullivan, Stainbrook became a starter for the rest of her rookie season. On October 20, she scored her first professional from a cross by Tara McKeown to open the scoring in a 2–0 win over the Chicago Red Stars. She played in 11 league games, starting 4, and scored 1 goal as the Spirit placed second in the league. In the playoffs, she started the first two games to help the Spirit reach the 2024 NWSL Championship, but was unused in the loss to the Orlando Pride. The following season, she again made 11 league appearances, starting 6, as the Spirit repeated their second-place finish. She was unused in the playoffs as the Spirit made the 2025 NWSL Championship, losing to Gotham FC.

==== Loan to Dallas Trinity ====
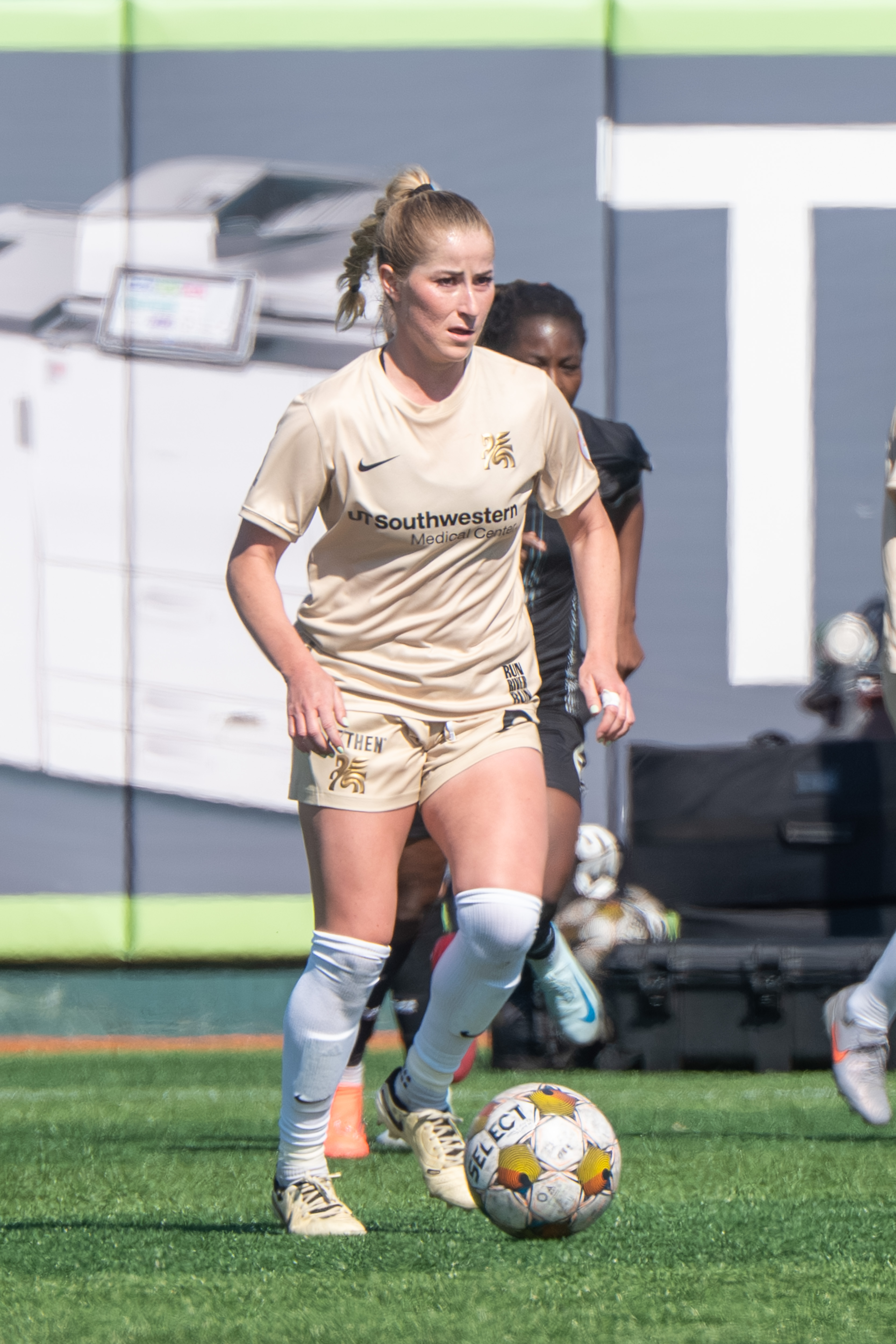
Stainbrook with the Dallas Trinity in 2026

On January 20, 2026, Stainbrook joined USL Super League club Dallas Trinity on loan for the entire year, becoming the fifth Spirit player loaned to Dallas in the last year and a half. She made her debut for the club on January 31, assisting the opening goal by Camryn Lancaster in a draw with Brooklyn FC. The following match, Stainbrook scored her first USL Super League goal as Dallas beat Fort Lauderdale United FC, 4–0. She earned a berth on the March 2026 USL Super League Team of the Month after continuing to cement herself as an active contributor in the Trinity's midfield.

== Career statistics ==
As of match played May 23, 2026

Appearances and goals by club, season and competition
Club	Season	League			Continental		Playoffs (Note: Includes NWSL Playoffs)		Total	
Club	Season	Division	Apps	Goals	Apps	Goals	Apps	Goals	Apps	Goals
Washington Spirit	2024	NWSL	11	1	3 (Note: Includes NWSL x Liga MX Femenil Summer Cup)	0	2	0	16	1
Washington Spirit	2025	NWSL	11	0	4 (Note: Includes CONCACAF W Champions Cup)	1	0	0	15	1
Washington Spirit	Total		22	1	7	1	2	0	31	2
Dallas Trinity FC (loan)	2025–26	USLS	11	2	0	0	0	0	11	2
Career total			33	3	7	1	2	0	42	4

== Honors and awards ==
Washington Spirit

- NWSL Challenge Cup: 2025

Utah Valley Wolverines

- Western Athletic Conference: 2020, 2022, 2023
- WAC tournament: 2020

Individual

- WAC Offensive Player of the Year: 2022
- First-team All-WAC: 2021, 2022, 2023
- WAC all-freshman team: 2019
- WAC tournament all-tournament team: 2020, 2022
