= 2020 Western Athletic Conference men's soccer season =

- League: NCAA Division I
- Sport: Soccer
- Duration: February 3, 2021 – April 10, 2021
- Teams: 11

2021 MLS SuperDraft
- Top draft pick: N/A

Regular Season
- Season MVP: Offensive: Defensive: Goalkeeper:

Tournament

WAC men's soccer seasons
- ← 2019 2021

2020 Western Athletic Conference men's soccer standings
	Conf.					Overall
Team	W		L		T	W		L		T
No. 25 Grand Canyon +	7	–	0	–	0	8	–	2	–	0
UTRGV	6	–	1	–	2	6	–	2	–	2
San Jose State	5	–	1	–	2	5	–	1	–	3
California Baptist ^{#}	5	–	4	–	1	6	–	4	–	2
UNLV	4	–	4	–	2	4	–	5	–	2
Seattle	4	–	2	–	1	6	–	4	–	1
Air Force ‡	4	–	4	–	1	6	–	5	–	2
Dixie State ^{#}	3	–	6	–	0	3	–	6	–	0
Utah Valley	2	–	4	–	0	3	–	4	–	0
Incarnate Word	2	–	7	–	0	2	–	7	–	0
Houston Baptist	0	–	9	–	1	0	–	9	–	2
Chicago State ¿	0	–	0	–	0	1	–	2	–	0
‡ – Conference tournament champion + – Also invited to the 2020 NCAA tournament # – Ineligible (In transition) ¿– Not competing in WAC until 2022; As of May 28, 2021; Rankings from United Soccer Coaches

The 2020 Western Athletic Conference men's soccer season will be the 38th season of men's varsity soccer in the conference. The regular season will begin on February 3, 2021 and conclude on April 10, 2021.

The regular season will culminate with the 2020 WAC Men's Soccer Tournament, which will begin on April 14 and conclude on April 18, 2021.

== Effects of the Covid-19 Pandemic ==
As a result of the COVID-19 pandemic, the WAC postponed sports through the calendar year on August 13, 2020.

On November 4, 2020, the NCAA approved moving fall championships to the spring.

San Jose State announced that they will not have fans at home games.

== Teams ==
A total of 11 teams are due to take part in the conference this season.

=== Changes from last season ===
The 2019 season was the last for both CSU Bakersfield and Kansas City as WAC members. On July 1, 2020, CSU Bakersfield joined the Big West Conference and Kansas City returned to the Summit League after a seven-year absence.

The WAC added a new member, as Dixie State (Note: Now known as Utah Tech University Trailblazers) joined from the Rocky Mountain Athletic Conference. They will be ineligible for the postseason until the 2024–25 season, as they will complete the four-year reclassification process.

=== Stadiums and locations ===
College	Location	Venue	Capacity
Air Force Falcons	Colorado Springs, Colorado	Cadet Soccer Stadium	1,000
Cal Baptist Lancers	Riverside, California	California Baptist Soccer Field	250
Dixie State	St. George, Utah	Greater Zion Stadium	10,500
Grand Canyon Antelopes	Phoenix, Arizona	GCU Stadium	6,000
Houston Baptist Huskies	Houston, Texas	Sorrels Field	500
Incarnate Word Cardinals	San Antonio, Texas	Gayle and Tom Benson Stadium	6,000
San Jose State Spartans	San Jose, California	Spartan Soccer Field	1,000
Seattle Redhawks	Seattle, Washington	Championship Field	1,000
UNLV Rebels	Las Vegas, Nevada	Peter Johann Soccer Field	500
Utah Valley Wolverines	Orem, Utah	Clyde Field	1,000
UTRGV Vaqueros	Edinburg, Texas	Soccer and Track & Field Complex	1,250

== Matches ==
Index to colors and formatting
WAC member won
WAC member lost
WAC member tied

=== Non-conference ===
Date	Time (MT)	Visiting team	Home team	Site	Result	Attendance
~~February 3~~	Cancelled	~~Cal Baptist~~	~~Pacific~~	~~Knoles Field~~	N/A	
February 3	5:00 p.m.	Gonzaga	Seattle	Championship Field	3–2	0
February 6	6:00 p.m.	St. Thomas (Tex.)	Houston Baptist	Sorrels Field	0-0	227
February 21	Postponed	Portland	Seattle	Championship Field		
~~March 3~~	~~Cancelled~~	~~Seattle~~	~~Oregon State~~	~~Lorenz Field~~	N/A	
March 10	7:00 p.m.	Seattle	Washington	Husky Soccer Stadium		

=== Conference ===
==== Matchday 1 ====
Date	Time (MT)	Visiting team	Home team	Site	Result	Attendance
February 6	1:00 p.m.	Air Force	Dixie State	Greater Zion Stadium	4-0	445
~~February 6~~	Cancelled	~~Incarnate Word~~	~~San Jose State~~	~~Spartan Soccer Field~~	N/A	
February 6	Postponed	Utah Valley	Grand Canyon	GCU Stadium		
February 6	7:00 p.m.	Rio Grande Valley	Seattle	Championship Field	1-0	0
~~February 7~~	Cancelled	~~Cal Baptist~~	~~UNLV~~	~~Peter Johann Soccer Field~~	N/A	

==== Matchday 2 ====
Date	Time (MT)	Visiting team	Home team	Site	Result	Attendance
February 13	11:00 a.m.	UNLV	Incarnate Word	Gayle and Tom Benson Stadium	2-3	25
February 13	1:00 p.m.	Seattle	Houston Baptist	Sorrels Field	4-0	40
~~February 13~~	Cancelled	~~San Jose State~~	~~Air Force~~	~~Cadet Soccer Stadium~~	N/A	
February 13	Postponed	Dixie State	Cal Baptist	California Baptist Soccer Field		
February 13	Cancelled	Grand Canyon	Rio Grande Valley	Soccer and Track & Field Complex		

==== Matchday 3 ====
Date	Time (MT)	Visiting team	Home team	Site	Result	Attendance
February 20	1:00 p.m.	San Jose State	Dixie State	Greater Zion Stadium	2-1	186
February 20	Postponed	Incarnate Word	Utah Valley	Clyde Field		
February 20	7:00 p.m.	Houston Baptist	Grand Canyon	GCU Stadium	1-2	0
February 20	7:00 p.m.	Air Force	UNLV	Peter Johann Soccer Field	0-0	0
February 24	6:00 p.m.	Rio Grande Valley	Cal Baptist	California Baptist Soccer Field	0-0	0

==== Matchday 4 ====
Date	Time (MT)	Visiting team	Home team	Site	Result	Attendance
February 27	11:00 a.m.	Dixie State	Incarnate Word	Gayle and Tom Benson Stadium	2-1	50
February 27	1:00 p.m.	Utah Valley	Air Force	Cadet Soccer Stadium	3-1	45
February 27	5:00 p.m.	UNLV	Seattle	Championship Field	1-1	0
February 27	8:00 p.m.	Grand Canyon	San Jose State	Spartan Soccer Field	3-2	1
February 28	1:00 p.m.	Cal Baptist	Houston Baptist	Sorrels Field	2-1	60

==== Matchday 5 ====
Date	Time (MT)	Visiting team	Home team	Site	Result	Attendance
March 5	8:00 p.m.	Houston Baptist	UNLV	Peter Johann Soccer Field	0-1	80
March 6	1:00 p.m.	Incarnate Word	Cal Baptist	Soccer and Track & Field Complex	1-2	0
March 6	1:30 p.m.	Rio Grande Valley	Utah Valley	Clyde Field	3-1	120
March 6	7:00 p.m.	Air Force	Grand Canyon	GCU Stadium	0-1	215
March 6	7:00 p.m.	Seattle	Dixie State	Greater Zion Stadium	2-0	107

==== Matchday 6 ====
Date	Time (MT)	Visiting team	Home team	Site	Result	Attendance
March 13	11:00 a.m.	UNLV	Rio Grande Valley	Soccer and Track & Field Complex	1-0	
March 13	1:00 p.m.	San Jose State	Houston Baptist	Sorrels Field	1-1	111
March 13	6:00 p.m.	Grand Canyon	Incarnate Word	Gayle and Tom Benson Stadium	1-0	50
March 13	Cancelled	Dixie State	Utah Valley	Clyde Field	N/A	
March 16	1:00 p.m.	Seattle	Air Force	Cadet Soccer Stadium	1-0	0

==== Matchday 7 ====
Date	Time (MT)	Visiting team	Home team	Site	Result	Attendance
March 19	8:00 p.m.	Utah Valley	UNLV	Peter Johann Soccer Field	0-1	
March 20	5:00 p.m.	Houston Baptist	Dixie State	Greater Zion Stadium	1-2	132
March 20	6:30 p.m.	Cal Baptist	Grand Canyon	GCU Stadium	1-3	264
March 20	8:00 p.m.	Rio Grande Valley	San Jose State	Spartan Soccer Field	1-1	
March 21	1:00 p.m.	Incarnate Word	Seattle	Championship Field	1-7	50

==== Matchday 8 ====
Date	Time (MT)	Visiting team	Home team	Site	Result	Attendance
March 25	Cancelled	Utah Valley	Seattle	Championship Field	N/A	
March 26	11:00 a.m.	Air Force	Rio Grande Valley	Soccer and Track & Field Complex	1-3	143
March 26	5:00 p.m.	San Jose State	Cal Baptist	California Baptist Soccer Field	4-0	0
March 26	6:30 p.m.	Houston Baptist	Incarnate Word	Gayle and Tom Benson Stadium	0-2	115
March 26	8:00 p.m.	Dixie State	Grand Canyon	GCU Stadium	1-5	0

==== Matchday 9 ====
Date	Time (MT)	Visiting team	Home team	Site	Result	Attendance
March 31	11:00 a.m.	Air Force	Incarnate Word	Gayle and Tom Benson Stadium	3-1	115
March 31	5:00 p.m.	UNLV	Dixie State	Greater Zion Stadium	2-0	329
March 31	5:00 p.m.	Seattle	Cal Baptist	California Baptist Soccer Field	0-1	0
March 31	6:00 p.m.	Rio Grande Valley	Houston Baptist	Sorrels Field	4-3	110
March 31	7:00 p.m.	San Jose State	Utah Valley	Clyde Field	3-2	245

Matchday 10

Date	Time (MT)	Visiting team	Home team	Site	Result	Attendance
April 5	Cancelled	Grand Canyon	Seattle	Championship Field	N/A	
April 5	11:00 a.m.	Dixie State	Rio Grande Valley	Soccer and Track & Field Complex	1-0	116
April 5	6:00 p.m.	UNLV	San Jose State	Spartan Soccer Field	0-1	0
April 5	6:00 p.m.	Utah Valley	Houston Baptist	Sorrels Field	2-1	130
April 5	6:00 p.m.	Cal Baptist	Air Force	Cadet Soccer Stadium	1-4	64

==== Matchday 11 ====
Date	Time (MT)	Visiting team	Home team	Site	Result	Attendance
April 9	7:00 p.m.	Cal Baptist	Utah Valley	Clyde Field		
April 9	8:00 p.m.	Seattle	San Jose State	Spartan Soccer Field		
April 10	11:00 a.m.	Incarnate Word	Rio Grande Valley	Soccer and Track & Field Complex		
April 10	1:00 p.m.	Houston Baptist	Air Force	Cadet Soccer Stadium		
April 10	8:00 p.m.	Grand Canyon	UNLV	Peter Johann Soccer Field		
