= Faith Webber =

American soccer player (born 2002)

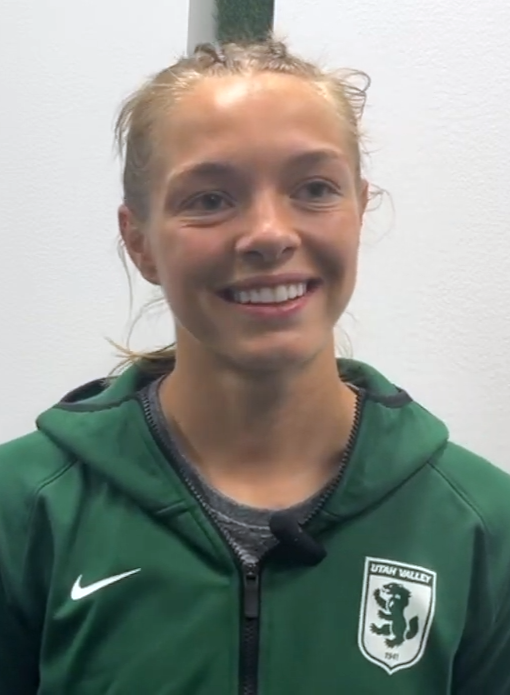
- Webber with Utah Valley in 2025

Personal information
- Date of birth: October 10, 2002 (age 24)
- Place of birth: Flint, Michigan, United States
- Height: 5 ft 8 in (1.73 m)
- Position: Forward

Team information
- Current team: Sydney FC
- Number: 2

Youth career
- Nationals GA
- 2017–2018: Grand Blanc Bobcats

College career
Years	Team	Apps	(Gls)
2020–2021	Delta Pioneers	29	(59)
2022–2025	Utah Valley Wolverines	82	(70)

Senior career*
Years	Team	Apps	(Gls)
2022	Detroit City	3	(1)
2026	Denver Summit	0	(0)
2026	→ Tampa Bay Sun (loan)	14	(2)
2026–	Sydney FC	3	(1)
- * Club domestic league appearances and goals as of October 31, 2026

Faith Webber (born October 10, 2002) is an American professional soccer player who plays as a forward for Sydney FC of the A-League Women (ALW). After two seasons with the NJCAA DIII champion Delta Pioneers, she played college soccer for the Utah Valley Wolverines, setting a program record with 70 career goals. She twice led NCAA Division I in goals or goals per game.

== Early life ==
Webber was born in Flint, Michigan, and grew up in nearby Grand Blanc. She played high school soccer for two seasons at Grand Blanc High School, scoring 58 goals, reaching two MHSAA D1 finals, and being named all-state. She also played club soccer for Nationals in the Girls Academy. During her sophomore year, she committed to play NCAA Division I college soccer for Michigan State along with her older sister, Paige, who later transferred to Indiana. However, after her sophomore season, she decided to take a break from the sport for a while. After graduating from high school, she enrolled in Delta College, a two-year community college in University Center, Michigan.

== College career ==
=== Delta College ===
Webber joined the Delta College Pioneers in the spring of 2021, leading the NJCAA Division III with 24 goals in 12 games as a freshman. She helped the Pioneers win their first NJCAA DIII national title and was named tournament MVP after scoring six goals in three games in the tournament. In the fall of 2021, she ranked second in the NJCAA with 35 goals in 17 games for Delta College. She again led the Pioneers to the NJCAA DIII national title game and was named the tournament Most Valuable Offensive Player after scoring five goals for the runners-up. She was named first-team NJCAA DIII All-American both seasons and was named the MCCAA Player of the Year in 2021. She later said her time at Delta College rekindled the "passion for the game that I had when I was a kid".

=== Utah Valley ===
Looking for an opportunity in NCAA Division I, Webber found the Utah Valley Wolverines through connections to head coach Chris Lemay, a fellow Michigan native. In the summer of 2021, she committed to join the program after her fall campaign with Delta College. She also played for USL W League club Detroit City in the summer of 2022. In her debut season at Utah Valley in 2022, she scored a then program record 14 goals in 22 games, earning first-team All-WAC honors. She helped the Wolverines to the WAC regular-season title, the WAC tournament final, and the program's first at-large NCAA tournament entry.

Webber broke her own program record with 16 goals in 19 games in 2023, including a hat trick against the No. 19–ranked USC Trojans. She broke the record again with 18 goals in 19 games in 2024, leading NCAA Division I in goals per game, and helping the Wolverines to their third consecutive WAC regular-season title. During the season, she passed Heather Stainbrook as the top scorer in program history. She was named first-team All-WAC for the third time and was named the WAC Offensive Player of the Year in 2024. TopDrawerSoccer ranked her as the 56th-best player in the nation in 2023 and 37th in 2024.

The following summer, Webber played for Austin Rise FC at the Soccer Tournament 2025. After an NCAA rule change that stopped counting junior college seasons against NCAA eligibility, she decided to return to Utah Valley for a fourth and final season in 2025. She had also trained with the Utah Royals and San Diego Wave of the National Women's Soccer League (NWSL). She topped her scoring record once more with 22 goals in 22 games, earning first-team All-WAC honors for the fourth time in four years. She tied with Colorado's Hope Leyba for the most goals in NCAA Division I. She helped win her fourth consecutive WAC regular-season title, again reaching the WAC tournament final, and earned a second at-large bid into the NCAA tournament. TopDrawerSoccer ranked her 20th in the nation in 2025.

== Club career ==
=== Tampa Bay Sun ===
On January 17, 2026, NWSL expansion team Denver Summit FC announced that they had signed Webber to her first professional contract on a one-year deal. Two weeks later, the Summit announced that she had joined USL Super League club Tampa Bay Sun on loan for the rest of their season in a swap deal for Natasha Flint. She made her professional debut for the Sun the next day in a 2–2 draw with the Spokane Zephyr. On February 21, she appeared to score her first professional goal in a 3–0 win over Fort Lauderdale United, but it was officially credited as an own goal by the goalkeeper. On March 26, she scored her first professional goal in a 2–0 victory over DC Power FC; the impressive volley with her second touch was awarded USL Super League Goal of the Month. She finished the loan with 2 goals in 14 appearances.

=== Sydney FC ===
On August 13, 2026, it was announced that Webber had signed with Australian club Sydney FC, joining former Sun teammate Charlotte McLean. She debuted for the club in their season-opening 2–2 draw with Adelaide United on October 18. Two weeks later, she captained Sydney for the first time and scored her first goal for the club in their 1–0 victory over Brisbane Roar.

== Honors and awards ==
Delta College Pioneers

- NJCAA Division III national championship: 2020

Utah Valley Wolverines

- Western Athletic Conference: 2022, 2023, 2024, 2025

Individual

- WAC Offensive Player of the Year: 2024
- First-team All-WAC: 2022, 2023, 2024, 2025
- WAC tournament all-tournament team: 2022, 2025
- NCAA Division I goals per game leader: 2024
- NCAA Division I goals leader: 2025
- First-team NJCAA Division III All-American: 2020, 2021
- MCCAA Player of the Year: 2021
- First-team All-MCCAA: 2020, 2021
- NJCAA DIII goals leader: 2020
- NJCAA DIII national championship MVP/Offensive MVP: 2020, 2021
