= 2025 WAC women's soccer tournament =

- Classification: Division I
- Teams: 4
- Matches: 3
- Attendance: 3,540
- Site: UCCU Stadium; Orem, Utah
- Champions: California Baptist (2nd title)
- Winning coach: Kristen St. Clair (2nd title)
- MVP: Mikayla O’Brien (California Baptist)
- Broadcast: ESPN+

2025 WAC women's soccer standings
	Conf.						Overall
Team	W		L		T	PCT	W		L		T	PCT
Utah Valley ‍†‍‍	9	–	0	–	1	.950	14	–	5	–	3	.705
California Baptist ‍‍‡‍^{y}	6	–	3	–	1	.650	10	–	9	–	4	.522
Utah Tech ‍‍‍	4	–	4	–	2	.500	8	–	7	–	5	.525
Abilene Christian ‍‍‍	2	–	5	–	3	.350	6	–	11	–	3	.375
Tarleton State ‍‍‍	1	–	5	–	4	.300	7	–	7	–	6	.500
Southern Utah ‍‍‍	2	–	7	–	1	.250	3	–	12	–	3	.250
† – Conference champion ‡ – 2025 WAC Tournament champion y – Invited to the NCAA Tournament; As of December 9, 2025; Rankings from United Soccer Coaches Poll; Source:WAC

The 2025 Western Athletic Conference women's soccer tournament was the postseason women's soccer tournament for the Western Athletic Conference held on November 5 and November 8, 2025. The three-match tournament took place at UCCU Stadium in Orem, Utah on the campus of Utah Valley University. The four-team single-elimination tournament consisted of two rounds based on seeding from regular-season conference play. The defending champions were the California Baptist Lancers. Cal Baptist successfully defended its title as the second seed, defeating first seed and tournament host Utah Valley 4–3 in a penalty shoot-out in the Final. This was the second WAC Tournament victory in California Baptist program history, and the second tournament title for head coach Kristen St. Clair. As tournament champions, California Baptist earned the WAC's automatic bid to the 2025 NCAA Division I women's soccer tournament.

== Seeding ==
The top four teams from regular season play qualified for the 2025 Tournament. Teams were seeded based on regular season conference records and the top two seeds earned a bye into the semifinal round. No tiebreakers were required as all of the top six teams finished with unique regular season conference records.

Seed	School	Conference Record	Points
1	Utah Valley	9–0–1	28
2	California Baptist	6–3–1	19
3	Utah Tech	4–4–2	14
4	Abilene Christian	2–5–3	9

== Bracket ==
Semifinals; Wednesday, Nov. 5
1	Utah Valley	7
4	Abilene Christian	0
2	California Baptist (pen.)	2 (2)
3	Utah Tech	2 (1)

Final; Saturday, Nov. 8
1	Utah Valley	2 (3)
2	California Baptist (pen.)	2 (4)

== Matches ==
=== Semifinals ===
November 5	(2) California Baptist	2–2 (a.e.t.) (2–1 p)	(3) Utah Tech	Orem, UT
3:00 p.m. MST	Anja Jestrovic 13'; Summer Allen (yellow card) 60'; Ava Westlund 90'; Ava Lopez (yellow card) 99'; Team (yellow card) 108'	Report	19' California Baptist Own Goal; (yellow card) 61' Abby Olsen; 78' Ella Cotter	Stadium: UCCU Stadium; Attendance: 1,002; Referee: Rachel Swett; Assistant referees: Karsten Gillwald; Wendell W. Ashby; Fourth official: Michael Anglin
	Penalties
	Anja Jestrovic (penalty scored); Rainie Clark (penalty missed); Kaylee Hauck (penalty scored); Mikayla O'Brien (penalty scored)		(penalty missed) Lacy Fox; (penalty missed) Kyah Le; (penalty missed) Bre Koscielski; (penalty scored) Abby Olsen; (penalty missed) Jocelyn Wright

November 5	(1) Utah Valley	7–0	(4) Abilene Christian	Orem, UT
6:00 p.m. MST	Bailey Peterson 11'; Josie Shepherd 29'; Jacey Wood 36'; Faith Webber 49', 55'; Ruby Hladek 53'; Taylor Nelson 65'	Report		Stadium: UCCU Stadium; Attendance: 1,193; Referee: Irving Navarro; Assistant referees: Karsten Gillwald; Wendell W. Ashby; Fourth official: Alex Krelo

=== Final ===
November 8	(1) Utah Valley	2–2 (a.e.t.) (3–4 p)	(2) California Baptist	Orem, UT
4:00 p.m. MST	Josie Shepherd 35'; Faith Webber 54'; Tylie Miller (yellow card) 61'	Report	61' (pen.) Anja Jestrovic; 71' Taylor Held	Stadium: UCCU Stadium; Attendance: 1,345; Referee: Kelsey Harms; Assistant referees: Joshua Mills; Daniel Reading; Fourth official: Jordan Downs
	Penalties
	Marie Quentel (penalty scored); Faith Webber (penalty missed); Ruby Hladek (penalty scored); Josie Shepherd (penalty missed); Mia Owens (penalty scored)		(penalty scored) Anja Jestrovic; (penalty missed) Jessica Ramirez; (penalty scored) Kaylee Hauck; (penalty scored) Ava Westlund; (penalty scored) Mikayla O'Brien

== Statistics ==
=== Goalscorers ===
There were 15 goals scored in 3 matches, for an average of 5 goals per match (as of November 8, 2025).

3 goals

- Faith Webber – Utah Valley

2 goals

- Anja Jestrovic – California Baptist
- Josie Shepherd – Utah Valley

1 goal

- Taylor Held – California Baptist
- Ava Westlund – California Baptist
- Ella Cotter – Utah Tech
- Ruby Hladek – Utah Valley
- Taylor Nelson – Utah Valley
- Bailey Peterson – Utah Valley
- Jacey Wood – Utah Valley

1 own goal

- California Baptist (vs Utah Tech)

== All-Tournament team ==
Player	Team
**Mikayla O’Brien**	California Baptist
Taylor Held	California Baptist
Anja Jestrovic	California Baptist
Ava Lopez	California Baptist
Ava Westlund	California Baptist
Ruby Hladek	Utah Valley
Mia Owens	Utah Valley
Bailey Peterson	Utah Valley
Josie Shepherd	Utah Valley
Faith Webber	Utah Valley
Ella Cotter	Utah Tech

MVP in bold
