= Erwin Martínez =

American soccer player

Personal information
- Full name: Francisco Martínez
- Date of birth: May 21, 2003 (age 23)
- Place of birth: Gilbert, Arizona, United States
- Height: 5 ft 9 in (1.75 m)
- Position: Defender

Youth career
- 2016–2020: Real Salt Lake

College career
Years	Team	Apps	(Gls)
2020–2021	Utah Valley Wolverines	6	(0)

Senior career*
Years	Team	Apps	(Gls)
2021	Real Monarchs	6	(0)
- * Club domestic league appearances and goals as of September 13, 2021

Erwin Martínez (born May 21, 2003) is an American soccer player who plays as a defender.

== Club career ==
Born in Gilbert, Arizona, Martínez began his career in the youth setup of Major League Soccer club Real Salt Lake. On February 25, 2020, it was announced that Martínez had committed to playing college soccer for the Utah Valley Wolverines. During his first season, he made six appearances for the Wolverines.

On May 21, 2021, Martínez returned to the Real Salt Lake setup and made his senior debut for the club's USL Championship affiliate Real Monarchs against Austin Bold, starting in the 1–1 draw.

== International career ==
Martínez has been called up to represent the United States in camps.

== Career statistics ==
=== Club ===
As of match played September 13, 2021

Appearances and goals by club, season and competition
Club	Season	League			National Cup		Continental		Total	
Club	Season	Division	Apps	Goals	Apps	Goals	Apps	Goals	Apps	Goals
Real Monarchs	2021	USL Championship	6	0	—		—		6	0
Career total			6	0	0	0	0	0	6	0
