= 2026 Western Athletic Conference softball tournament =

- Teams: 6
- Format: Double-elimination tournament
- Finals site: Tarleton Softball Complex; Stephenville, Texas
- Champions: California Baptist (1st title)
- Winning coach: Brandon Telesco (1st title)
- MVP: Makayla Medellin (California Baptist)

2026 Western Athletic Conference softball standings
	Conf.				Overall
Team	W		L	PCT	W		L	PCT
California Baptist ‍†‍‡‍^{y}	15	–	3	.833	43	–	19	.694
Tarleton State ‍‍‍	13	–	5	.722	38	–	23	.623
UT Arlington ‍‍‍	12	–	6	.667	24	–	23	.511
Utah Valley ‍‍‍	8	–	10	.444	31	–	23	.574
Southern Utah ‍‍‍	6	–	12	.333	21	–	30	.412
Utah Tech ‍‍‍	5	–	13	.278	19	–	34	.358
Abilene Christian ‍‍‍	4	–	14	.222	7	–	41	.146
† – Conference champion ‡ – Tournament champion y – Invited to the NCAA tournament As of May 17, 2026; Rankings from NFCA/USA Today

The 2026 Western Athletic Conference Softball tournament was held at Tarleton Softball Complex on the campus of Tarleton State University in Stephenville, Texas from May 6 through May 9, 2026. The tournament was won by the California Baptist Lancers, who earned the Western Athletic Conference's automatic bid to the 2026 NCAA Division I softball tournament

This was the last tournament held under the WAC name. On July 1, 2026, the WAC rebranded as the United Athletic Conference.

== Format and seeding ==
The top six finishers from the conference's round-robin regular season qualified for the tournament. The top two seeds received a single bye, with the remaining teams playing opening round games.

== Bracket ==
Upper round 1
4	Utah Valley	3
5	Southern Utah	2
3	UT Arlington	4
6	Utah Tech	7
Lower round 1
3	UT Arlington	1
4	Utah Valley	5
5	Southern Utah	14^{(5)}
6	Utah Tech	5

Upper round 2
1	California Baptist	3
4	Utah Valley	1
2	Tarleton State	5
6	Utah Tech	2
Lower round 2
4	Utah Valley	2
5	Southern Utah	1

Upper final
1	California Baptist	12 ^{(5)}
2	Tarleton State	4
Lower final
2	Tarleton State	8
4	Utah Valley	4

Final
1	California Baptist	4	8
2	Tarleton State	6	2

== All Tournament Team ==
Player	Team
Ashlee Annett	California Baptist
Miranda De Nava	California Baptist
Kenzie Farrier-Pilon	California Baptist
**Makayla Medellin**	California Baptist
Sydney Peterson	California Baptist
Braylin Pannill	Tarleton State
MadCasey Schultz	Tarleton State
Shelby Schultz	Tarleton State
Macie Vickers	Tarleton State
Lily Riley	Utah Valley
Michaella Salvatierra	Southern Utah

MVP in bold
