= 2024 WAC women's soccer tournament =

- Classification: Division I
- Teams: 6
- Matches: 5
- Attendance: 534
- Site: Elmer Gray Stadium; Abilene, Texas
- Champions: California Baptist (1st title)
- Winning coach: Kristen St. Clair (1st title)
- MVP: Jayden Ramirez (California Baptist)
- Broadcast: ESPN+

2024 WAC women's soccer standings
	Conf.						Overall
Team	W		L		T	PCT	W		L		T	PCT
Utah Valley ‍†‍‍	6	–	0	–	1	.929	12	–	5	–	2	.684
Grand Canyon ‍‍‍	5	–	1	–	1	.786	11	–	6	–	3	.625
Seattle ‍‍‍	4	–	1	–	2	.714	10	–	3	–	6	.684
California Baptist ‍‍‡‍^{y}	3	–	3	–	1	.500	10	–	7	–	3	.575
Tarleton State ‍‍‍	3	–	4	–	0	.429	9	–	8	–	3	.525
Utah Tech ‍‍‍	2	–	4	–	1	.357	5	–	7	–	5	.441
Abilene Christian ‍‍‍	0	–	5	–	2	.143	2	–	7	–	8	.353
Southern Utah ‍‍‍	0	–	5	–	2	.143	2	–	10	–	5	.265
† – Conference champion ‡ – 2024 WAC Tournament champion y – Invited to the NCAA Tournament; As of December 10, 2024; Rankings from United Soccer Coaches Poll; Source:WAC

The 2024 Western Athletic Conference women's soccer tournament was the postseason women's soccer tournament for the Western Athletic Conference held from November 3 to November 9, 2024. The five-match tournament took place at Elmer Gray Stadium in Abilene, Texas on the campus of Abilene Christian University. The six-team single-elimination tournament consisted of three rounds based on seeding from regular-season divisional conference play. The defending champions were the Grand Canyon Antelopes. Grand Canyon was the second seed in the 2024 tournament and reached the final. However, they fell in the Final to California Baptist 3–2. This was the first WAC Tournament victory in California Baptist program history, and the first tournament title for head coach Kristen St. Clair. As tournament champions, California Baptist earned the WAC's automatic bid to the 2024 NCAA Division I women's soccer tournament.

== Seeding ==
The top six teams from regular season play qualified for the 2024 Tournament. Teams were seeded based on regular season conference records and the top two seeds earned a bye into the semifinal round. No tiebreakers were required as all of the top six teams finished with unique regular season conference records.

Seed	School	Conference Record	Points
1	Utah Valley	6–0–1	19
2	Grand Canyon	5–1–1	16
3	Seattle	4–1–2	14
4	California Baptist	3–3–1	10
5	Tarleton State	3–4–0	9
6	Utah Tech	2–4–1	7

== Bracket ==
First round Sunday, Nov. 3
4	California Baptist	2
5	Tarleton State	0
3	Seattle	2
6	Utah Tech	0

Semifinals; Wednesday, Nov. 6
1	Utah Valley	2
4	California Baptist	3
2	Grand Canyon (pen.)	0 (4)
3	Seattle	0 (2)

Final; Saturday, Nov. 9
4	California Baptist	3
2	Grand Canyon	2

== Matches ==
=== First round ===
November 3, 2024	#4 California Baptist	2–0	#5 Tarleton State	Abilene, TX
4:00 p.m. CST	Lauren White 46', 82'; Kaylee Hauck (yellow card) 87'	Report	(yellow card) 59' Team; (yellow card) 86' Stevie Reynolds	Stadium: Elmer Gray Stadium; Attendance: 96; Referee: Brandon Gardner; Assistant referees: Tony Obas; Carlos De Dios; Fourth official: Bert Green

November 3, 2024	#3 Seattle	2–0	#6 Utah Tech	Abilene, TX
7:00 p.m. CST	Bella Bonnett 75'; Kailee Wilson 80'	Report		Stadium: Elmer Gray Stadium; Attendance: 96; Referee: Habeeb Hooshmand; Assistant referees: Harry Baydear; William Tomlinson; Fourth official: Joshual Ell

=== Semifinals ===
November 6, 2024	#1 Utah Valley	2–3	#4 California Baptist	Abilene, TX
4:00 p.m. CST	Ruby Hladek 14'; Greta Davis (yellow card) 32'; Quincy Bonds 36'; Taylor Nelson (yellow card) 64'	Report	(yellow card) 43' Summer Allen; (yellow card) 52', (goal) 88' Kaylee Hauck; 67' Jayden Ramirez; (yellow card) 68' Katrina Marsh; 78', (yellow card) 81' (yellow-red card) 90' Ava Westlund	Stadium: Elmer Gray Stadium; Attendance: 96; Referee: Habeeb Hooshmand; Assistant referees: Jessie McNeil III; Geovany Martinez; Fourth official: Ben Cuyler

November 6, 2024	#2 Grand Canyon	0–0 (a.e.t.) (4–2 p)	#3 Seattle	Abilene, TX
7:00 p.m. CST		Report		Stadium: Elmer Gray Stadium; Attendance: 129; Referee: Arturo Ibarra; Assistant referees: William Dixon; Joseph Semus; Fourth official: Stephen Barelme
	Penalties
	AJ Loera (penalty scored); Bella Piete (penalty scored); Brenna Alderson (penalty missed); Aleisha Ganief (penalty scored); Ani Jensen (penalty scored)		(penalty missed) Alana Lamb; (penalty scored) U'i Kaaihue; (penalty scored) Hallie Bergford; (penalty missed) Caroline Penner

=== Final ===
November 9, 2024	#2 Grand Canyon	2–3	#4 California Baptist	Abilene, TX
2:00 p.m. CST	Aleisha Ganief 27', (yellow card) 85'; AJ Loera 61'	Report	53' Morgan Witz; (yellow card) 68' Sophia Petrov; 78' Grace Blumfeldt; 81' Natalia Castro	Stadium: Elmer Gray Stadium; Attendance: 117; Referee: William Hale; Assistant referees: Kellen Schmidt; Brian Cole; Fourth official: Daniel Radford

== Statistics ==
=== Goalscorers ===
There were 14 goals scored in 5 matches, for an average of 2.8 goals per match (as of November 9, 2024).

2 goals

- Lauren White – California Baptist

1 goal

- Grace Blumfeldt – California Baptist
- Quincy Bonds – Utah Valley
- Bella Bonnett – Seattle
- Natalia Castro – California Baptist
- Aleisha Ganief – Utah Valley
- Kaylee Hauck – California Baptist
- Ruby Hladek – Utah Valley
- AJ Loera – Utah Valley
- Jayden Ramirez – California Baptist
- Ava Westlund – California Baptist
- Kailee Wilson – Seattle
- Morgan Witz – California Baptist

== All-Tournament team ==
Player	Team
Summer Allen	California Baptist
Kaylee Hauck	California Baptist
**Jayden Ramirez**	California Baptist
Lauryn White	California Baptist
Morgan Witz	California Baptist
Aleisha Ganief	Grand Canyon
AJ Loera	Grand Canyon
Sidney Roberts	Grand Canyon
Kassidy Kirgan	Seattle
Kait Raffensperger	Seattle
Ruby Hladek	Utah Valley

MVP in bold
