= 2019 Western Athletic Conference men's soccer season =

- League: NCAA Division I
- Sport: Soccer
- Duration: August 30, 2019 – November 2, 2019
- Teams: 10

2020 MLS SuperDraft

Regular Season
- Season MVP: Offensive: Defensive: Goalkeeper:

Tournament

WAC men's soccer seasons
- ← 2018 2020 →

2019 Western Athletic Conference men's soccer standings
	Conf.					Overall
Team	W		L		T	W		L		T
No. 19 Seattle ‡	10	–	0	–	1	15	–	3	–	5
Utah Valley	8	–	3	–	0	13	–	6	–	2
Air Force	6	–	5	–	0	8	–	11	–	0
CSU Bakersfield	6	–	5	–	0	8	–	11	–	0
San Jose State	5	–	4	–	2	5	–	12	–	2
Cal Baptist ^{#}	5	–	5	–	1	6	–	11	–	2
Houston Baptist	5	–	6	–	0	7	–	11	–	0
Kansas City	5	–	6	–	0	6	–	11	–	0
UTRGV	4	–	5	–	2	8	–	6	–	2
UNLV	4	–	6	–	1	6	–	12	–	1
Incarnate Word	2	–	9	–	0	5	–	12	–	0
Grand Canyon	1	–	7	–	3	4	–	9	–	4
‡ – WAC Tournament Champion + – Invited to the 2019 NCAA tournament ^{#} – Ineligible for post-season (In transition); As of 17 December, 2019; Rankings from United Soccer Coaches

The 2019 Western Athletic Conference men's soccer season will be the 37th season of men's varsity soccer in the conference. The regular season will begin on August 30, 2019 and conclude on November 2, 2019.

The regular season will culminate with the 2019 WAC Men's Soccer Tournament, which will begin on November 8 and conclude on November 16, 2019.

== Background ==
The 2018 season began in August 2018 and concluded in November 2018. The regular season champions, Air Force, enjoyed their best regular season ever, and their best NCAA Tournament berth since 1993. Air Force finished the season ranked 12th in the nation, and achieved a 17–5–0 record. In the 2018 WAC Men's Soccer Tournament, Air Force were eliminated by eventual tournament champions, Grand Canyon. Both teams earned berths into the 2018 NCAA Division I Men's Soccer Tournament, being the two WAC representatives in the tournament.

In the NCAA Tournament, Grand Canyon was eliminated on penalty kicks by UC Irvine in the first round. Air Force defeated Central Arkansas, 4–0 in the first round. In the second round, they played against in-state rivals, Denver, where they won 2–1. In the Sweet Sixteen, Air Force traveled out east to take on Indiana, where they lost 2–0. Indiana would end being the national runners-up.

At the end of the season, Air Force's Tucker Bone was named a Consensus All-American by earned first-team All-American honors by College Soccer News, Top Drawer Soccer, Soccer America, and United Soccer Coaches. Bone was the highest drafted WAC player selected in the 2019 MLS SuperDraft, being drafted in the first round, twentieth overall by Seattle Sounders FC. Three other WAC players were drafted in the 2019 SuperDraft: Camden Riley (Sporting Kansas City), Nathan Aune (San Jose Earthquakes), and Mitch Osmond (Minnesota United FC).

== Teams ==
A total of 12 teams are due to take part in the conference this season.

On July 1, 2019, the University of Missouri–Kansas City announced that its athletic program, previously known as the UMKC Kangaroos, would be rebranded as the Kansas City Roos, with "Roos" having long been used as a short form of the historic "Kangaroos" nickname.

The 2019 season will be the last for both CSU Bakersfield and Kansas City as WAC members. On July 1, 2020, CSU Bakersfield will join the Big West Conference and Kansas City will return to the Summit League after a seven-year absence.

Locations of the 2019 WAC men's soccer season teams

=== Stadiums and locations ===
College	Location	Venue	Capacity
Air Force Falcons	Colorado Springs, Colorado	Cadet Soccer Stadium	1,000
Cal Baptist Lancers	Riverside, California	California Baptist Soccer Field	250
CSU Bakersfield Roadrunners	Bakersfield, California	CSUB Main Soccer Field	2,500
Grand Canyon Antelopes	Phoenix, Arizona	GCU Stadium	6,000
Houston Baptist Huskies	Houston, Texas	Sorrels Field	500
Incarnate Word Cardinals	San Antonio, Texas	Gayle and Tom Benson Stadium	
Kansas City Roos	Kansas City, Missouri	Durwood Soccer Stadium	3,200
San Jose State Spartans	San Jose, California	Spartan Soccer Field	1,000
Seattle Redhawks	Seattle, Washington	Championship Field	1,000
UNLV Rebels	Las Vegas, Nevada	Peter Johann Soccer Field	500
Utah Valley Wolverines	Orem, Utah	Clyde Field	1,000
UTRGV Vaqueros	Edinburg, Texas	Soccer and Track & Field Complex	2,000

== Head coaches ==
As of the 2018 season

Team	Head coach	Previous job	Years at school	Overall record	Record at school	WAC record	NCAA Tournaments	NCAA College Cups	NCAA Titles	Ref.
Air Force	Doug Hill	Air Force (asst.)	13	109–103–23 (.513)	109–103–23 (.513)	46–24–13 (.633)	3	0	0	
Cal Baptist	Coe Michaelson	Northwest Nazarene	4	108–74–19 (.585)	38–16–3 (.693)	0–0–0 (–)	1	0	0	
CSU Bakersfield	Richie Grant	Memphis	5	217–182–38 (.540)	29–37–12 (.449)	18–25–7 (.430)	0	0	0	
Grand Canyon	Schellas Hyndman	FC Dallas	5	562–214–115 (.695)	33–38–3 (.466)	17–20–4 (.463)	30	4	0	
Houston Baptist	Ryan Pratt	Houston Baptist (asst.)	1	0–0–0 (–)	0–0–0 (–)	0–0–0 (–)	0	0	0	
Incarnate Word	Vince Martinez		0	0–0–0 (–)	0–0–0 (–)	0–0–0 (–)				
Kansas City			0	0–0–0 (–)	0–0–0 (–)	0–0–0 (–)	0	0	0	
San Jose State			0	0–0–0 (–)	0–0–0 (–)	0–0–0 (–)	0	0	0	
Seattle U			0	0–0–0 (–)	0–0–0 (–)	0–0–0 (–)	0	0	0	
UNLV			0	0–0–0 (–)	0–0–0 (–)	0–0–0 (–)	0	0	0	
Utah Valley			0	0–0–0 (–)	0–0–0 (–)	0–0–0 (–)	0	0	0	
UTRGV			0	0–0–0 (–)	0–0–0 (–)	0–0–0 (–)	0	0	0	

== Preseason ==
=== Preseason poll ===
The preseason poll was released on August 21, 2019.

	Team ranking	Points	First place votes
1.	Seattle U	112	5
2.	UTRGV	104	2
T-3.	Air Force	88	3
T-3.	Grand Canyon	88	1
5.	UNLV	87	0
6.	San José State	77	1
7.	Utah Valley	75	0
8.	Cal Baptist	49	0
9.	CSU Bakersfield	387	0
T-10.	Houston Baptist	27	0
T-10.	Kansas City	27	0
12.	Incarnate Word	20	0

=== Preseason national polls ===
The preseason national polls were released in July and August 2019.

	United; Soccer	CSN	Soccer; America	Top Drawer; Soccer
Air Force	19	RV	RV	23
Cal Baptist	—	—	—	—
CSU Bakersfield	—	—	—	—
Grand Canyon	—	—	—	—
Houston Baptist	—	—	—	—
Incarnate Word	—	—	—	—
Kansas City	—	—	—	—
San Jose State	—	—	—	—
Seattle U	RV	RV	—	—
UNLV	—	—	—	—
Utah Valley	RV	RV	—	—
UTRGV	—	RV	—	—

=== Preseason awards ===
Listed in the order that they were released

Award	Team	Player	Position	Year

== Regular season ==
=== Early season tournaments ===
Team	Tournament	Finish
Cal State Bakersfield	John Rennie Nike Invitational	4th
Cal State Bakersfield	Copa de Causeway	3rd

=== Conference results ===
Color Key: Home • Away • Win • Loss • Draw • Postponed
Club	Match										
Club	1	2	3	4	5	6	7	8	9	10	11
Air Force Falcons (AFA)	KC	UIW	RGV	CBU	CSUB	HBU	SU	SJSU	GCU	UNLV	UVU
Air Force Falcons (AFA)	4–1	3–1	0–2	1–2	6–0	3–1	1–2	0–2	4–3	3–2	1–4
Cal Baptist Lancers (CBU)	SU	GCU	UNLV	AFA	UVU	SJSU	RGV	UIW	HBU	KC	CSUB
Cal Baptist Lancers (CBU)	0–2	0–0	4–0	2–1	0–1	2–1	0–1	3–0	1–2	0–1	3–1
CSU Bakersfield (CSUB)	SJSU	UNLV	GCU	UVU	AFA	SU	UIW	RGV	KC	HBU	CBU
CSU Bakersfield (CSUB)	2–3	1–0	2–1	0–2	0–6	2–3	4–0	1–0	2–1	2–0	1–3
Grand Canyon Antelopes (GCU)	UIW	CBU	CSUB	SJSU	SU	RGV	HBU	KC	AFA	UVU	UNLV
Grand Canyon Antelopes (GCU)	1–0	0–0	1–2	2–2	0–1	0–0	3–4	0–2	3–4	2–3	1–2
Houston Baptist Huskies (HBU)	UVU	SU	SJSU	RGV	UIW	AFA	GCU	UNLV	CBU	CSUB	KC
Houston Baptist Huskies (HBU)	0–3	0–5	3–2	0–4	0–1	1–3	4–3	3–1	2–1	0–2	2–0
Incarnate Word Cardinals (UIW)	GCU	AFA	UVU	KC	HBU	UNLV	CSUB	CBU	SU	SJSU	RGV
Incarnate Word Cardinals (UIW)	0–1	1–3	0–1	1–2	1–0	0–1	0–4	0–3	0–1	1–2	2–0
Kansas City Roos (KC)	AFA	SJSU	SU	UIW	RGV	UVU	UNLV	GCU	CSUB	CBU	HBU
Kansas City Roos (KC)	1–4	0–6	1–4	2–1	2–1	2–1	1–4	2–0	1–2	1–0	0–2
San Jose State Spartans (SJSU)	CSUB	KC	HBU	GCU	UNLV	CBU	UVU	AFA	RGV	UIW	SU
San Jose State Spartans (SJSU)	3–2	6–0	2–3	2–2	1–2	1–2	3–0	2–0	0–0	2–1	1–3
Seattle Redhawks (SU)	CBU	HBU	KC	UNLV	GCU	CSUB	AFA	UVU	UIW	RGV	SJSU
Seattle Redhawks (SU)	2–0	5–0	4–1	2–2	1–0	3–2	2–1	2–1	1–0	1–0	3–1
UNLV Rebels (UNLV)	RGV	CSUB	CBU	SU	SJSU	UIW	KC	HBU	UVU	AFA	GCU
UNLV Rebels (UNLV)	0–2	0–1	0–4	2–2	2–1	1–0	4–1	1–3	1–3	2–3	2–1
Utah Valley (UVU)	HBU	RGV	UIW	CSUB	CBU	KC	SJSU	SU	UNLV	GCU	AFA
Utah Valley (UVU)	3–0	2–1	1–0	2–0	1–0	1–2	0–3	1–2	3–1	3–2	4–1
UTRGV Vaqueros (RGV)	UNLV	UVU	AFA	HBU	KC	GCU	CBU	CSUB	SJSU	SU	UIW
UTRGV Vaqueros (RGV)	2–0	1–2	2–0	4–0	1–2	0–0	1–0	0–1	0–0	0–1	0–2

== Postseason ==
=== WAC Tournament ===
First round Nov. 13
4	Cal State Bakersfield	1
5	San Jose State	0
2	Utah Valley	3
7	Kansas City	0
3	Air Force	3
6	Houston Baptist	2

Semifinals; Nov. 15
1	Seattle U	1
4	Cal State Bakersfield	0
2	Utah Valley (pen.)	0 (6)
3	Air Force	0 (5)

Championship; Nov. 17
1	Seattle U (pen.)	0 (2)
2	Utah Valley	0 (1)

=== NCAA Tournament ===
The NCAA Tournament began in November 2019 and concluded on December 17, 2019.

Seed	Region	School	1st Round	2nd Round	3rd Round	Quarterfinals	Semifinals	Championship
—N/a	4	Seattle U	W, 3–1 at Loyola Marymount	T, 2–3 (L, 1–2 PK) at (7) Stanford	—	—	—	—

== Rankings ==
=== National rankings ===
	Improvement in ranking
	Drop in ranking
RV	Received votes but were not ranked in Top 25
NV	No votes received

		Pre	Wk 1	Wk 2	Wk 3	Wk 4	Wk 5	Wk 6	Wk 7	Wk 8	Wk 9	Wk 10	Wk 11	Wk 12	Wk 13	Wk 14	Wk 15	Wk 16	Final
Air Force	USC	19	25	NV	NV	NV	NV	NV	NV						None released				
Air Force	TDS	23	23	23	NV	NV	NV	NV	NV	NV									
Cal Baptist	USC	NV	NV	NV	NV	NV	NV	NV	NV						None released				
Cal Baptist	TDS	NV	NV	NV	NV	NV	NV	NV	NV	NV									
CSU Bakersfield	USC	NV	NV	NV	NV	NV	NV	NV	NV						None released				
CSU Bakersfield	TDS	NV	NV	NV	NV	NV	NV	NV	NV	NV									
Grand Canyon	USC	NV	NV	NV	NV	NV	NV	NV	NV						None released				
Grand Canyon	TDS	NV	NV	NV	NV	NV	NV	NV	NV	NV									
Houston Baptist	USC	NV	NV	NV	NV	NV	NV	NV	NV						None released				
Houston Baptist	TDS	NV	NV	NV	NV	NV	NV	NV	NV	NV									
Incarnate Word	USC	NV	NV	NV	NV	NV	NV	NV	NV						None released				
Incarnate Word	TDS	NV	NV	NV	NV	NV	NV	NV	NV	NV									
Kansas City	USC	NV	NV	NV	NV	NV	NV	NV	NV						None released				
Kansas City	TDS	NV	NV	NV	NV	NV	NV	NV	NV	NV									
San Jose State	USC	NV	NV	NV	NV	NV	NV	NV	NV						None released				
San Jose State	TDS	NV	NV	NV	NV	NV	NV	NV	NV	NV									
Seattle U	USC	RV	RV	NV	NV	NV	NV	NV	NV						None released				
Seattle U	TDS	NV	NV	RV	NV	NV	NV	NV	NV	NV									
UNLV	USC	NV	NV	NV	NV	NV	NV	NV	NV						None released				
UNLV	TDS	NV	NV	NV	NV	NV	NV	NV	NV	NV									
Utah Valley	USC	RV	NV	NV	NV	NV	NV	NV	RV						None released				
Utah Valley	TDS	NV	NV	NV	NV	NV	NV	NV	NV	NV									
UTRGV	USC	NV	NV	NV	NV	NV	RV	NV	NV						None released				
UTRGV	TDS	NV	NV	NV	NV	NV	RV	24	24	NV									

=== Regional rankings ===
	Improvement in ranking
	Drop in ranking
RV	Received votes but were not ranked in Top 10
NV	No votes received

The Far West region of the United Soccer poll ranks teams across the Pac-12, WAC, and Big West.

	Wk 1	Wk 2	Wk 3	Wk 4	Wk 5	Wk 6	Wk 7	Wk 8	Wk 9	Wk 10	Wk 11	Wk 12
Air Force	5	NV	NV	NV	NV	NV	NV					
Cal Baptist	NV	NV	NV	NV	NV	NV	NV					
CSU Bakersfield	NV	NV	NV	NV	NV	NV	NV					
Grand Canyon	NV	NV	10	10	9	NV	NV					
Houston Baptist	NV	NV	NV	NV	NV	NV	NV					
Incarnate Word	NV	NV	NV	NV	NV	NV	NV					
Kansas City	NV	NV	NV	NV	NV	NV	NV					
San Jose State	NV	NV	NV	NV	NV	NV	NV					
Seattle U	4	8	8	NV	NV	5	6					
UNLV	NV	NV	NV	NV	NV	NV	NV					
Utah Valley	6	10	NV	NV	NV	8	5					
UTRGV	NV	NV	NV	6	5	6	9					

== Awards and honors ==
=== Postseason honors ===
2019 WAC Men's Soccer Individual Awards
Award	Recipient(s)
Player of the Year	
Coach of the Year	
Defensive Player of the Year	
Rookie of the Year	

2019 WAC Men's Soccer All-Conference Teams
First Team	Second Team	Rookie Team

== 2020 MLS Draft ==
The 2020 MLS SuperDraft was held on January 9, 2020.

=== Total picks by school ===
Team	Round 1	Round 2	Round 3	Round 4	Total
Air Force	–	–	–	–	–
Cal Baptist	–	–	–	–	–
CSU Bakersfield	–	–	–	–	–
Grand Canyon	–	–	–	–	–
Houston Baptist	–	–	–	–	–
Incarnate Word	–	–	–	–	–
Kansas City	–	–	–	–	–
San Jose State	–	–	–	–	–
Seattle U	1	–	1	–	2
UNLV	–	1	–	–	1
Utah Valley	–	–	–	–	–
UTRGV	–	–	–	1	1

=== List of selections ===
Rnd.	Pick	Player	Pos.	Team	School
1	14	Nkosi Tafari	DF	FC Dallas	Seattle U
2	52	Timo Mehlich	MF	Seattle Sounders FC	UNLV
3	78	Julian Avila-Good	MF	Seattle Sounders FC	Seattle U
4	86	Kyle Edwards	FW	Houston Dynamo	UTRGV

== Homegrown players ==
The Homegrown Player Rule is a Major League Soccer program that allows MLS teams to sign local players from their own development academies directly to MLS first team rosters. Before the creation of the rule in 2008, every player entering Major League Soccer had to be assigned through one of the existing MLS player allocation processes, such as the MLS SuperDraft.

To place a player on its homegrown player list, making him eligible to sign as a homegrown player, players must have resided in that club's home territory and participated in the club's youth development system for at least one year. Players can play college soccer and still be eligible to sign a homegrown contract.

Original MLS team	Player	Pos.	School	Ref.
