= 2016 Western Athletic Conference softball tournament =

- Teams: 5
- Format: Double-elimination
- Finals site: Logan Field at SU Park; Seattle, WA
- Champions: CSU Bakersfield (1st title)
- Winning coach: Crissy Buck-Ziegler (1st title)
- MVP: Sydney Raeber (CSU Bakersfield)
- Television: WAC Digital Network

The 2016 Western Athletic Conference softball tournament was held at Logan Field on the campus of Seattle University in Seattle, Washington from May 12 through May 14, 2016. CSU Bakersfield earned its first Western Athletic Conference Tournament title, earning the league's automatic bid to the 2016 NCAA Division I softball tournament. All games were streamed online on the WAC Digital Network with Greg Sexton and Ashley Charters calling the action.

== Tournament ==
Upper round 1
4	Seattle U	0
5	Utah Valley	4
Lower round 1
2	UMKC	3
4	Seattle U	7

Upper round 2
1	New Mexico State	5
5	Utah Valley	2
2	UMKC	3
3	CSU Bakersfield	4
Lower round 2
5	Utah Valley	2
4	Seattle U	7

Upper final
1	New Mexico State	1
3	CSU Bakersfield	2
Lower final
1	New Mexico State	6
4	Seattle U	4

Final
3	CSU Bakersfield	1	–
1	New Mexico State	0	–

In the title game, CSU Bakersfield's catcher, Jo Larios, hit the eventual game-winning home run with two outs and a full count in the top of the seventh inning. The victory propelled the Roadrunners to the school's first NCAA Division I softball tournament appearance.

- All times listed are Pacific Daylight Time.
