= Chris Lemay =

American soccer coach and business owner

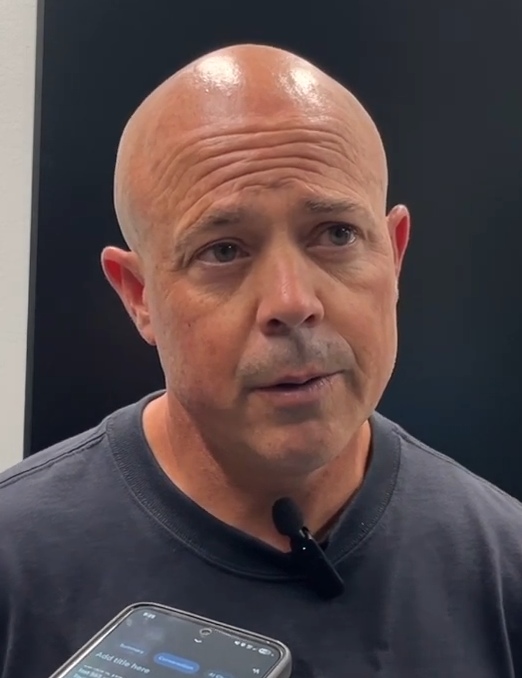
- Lemay in 2025

Current position
- Title: Head coach
- Team: Utah Valley Wolverines women's soccer
- Conference: Big West Conference

Biographical details
- Born: Michigan, U.S.
- Education: Eastern Michigan University (B.A.)

Playing career
- 1995–1999: Eastern Michigan Eagles men's soccer

Coaching career (HC unless noted)
- 2003–2006: UC Riverside Highlanders women's (assistant)
- 2012: San Diego State Aztecs women's (assistant)
- 2013–2016: California Golden Bears women's (associate hc)
- 2017–present: Utah Valley Wolverines women's

Head coaching record
- Overall: 100–65–22 (career at Utah Valley; as of late 2025)

Accomplishments and honors

Championships
- 1× Big West regular season (2026); 1× Big West tournament (2026); 4× WAC regular season (2022–2025); 2× WAC Tournament (2017, 2020)

Awards
- 3× WAC Coach of the Year (2022, 2024, 2025); UVU Presidential Award of Excellence (2024)

Chris Lemay is an American college soccer coach and entrepreneur. He is the head coach of the Utah Valley Wolverines women's soccer team and the founder of Soccer in the Sand, a series of nationwide beach soccer tournaments.

== Early life and playing career ==
Lemay is a native of Michigan. He was a four-year starter for the Eastern Michigan Eagles men's soccer team from 1995 to 1999, graduating with a degree in communication and a minor in business management.

== Coaching career ==
His early coaching included assistant roles at UC Riverside Highlanders women's soccer (2003–2006), where the team posted a 45-20-14 record, and youth programs like San Diego Surf Soccer Club and the San Diego Sea Lions in the Women's Premier Soccer League.

In 2012, he was an assistant coach for the San Diego State Aztecs women's soccer team, contributing to their Mountain West Conference title.

From 2013 to 2016, Lemay served as assistant coach (later associate head coach) for the California Golden Bears women's soccer team, helping achieve a 51-22-11 record and four NCAA Tournament appearances.

In February 2017, Lemay became head coach of the Utah Valley Wolverines women's soccer program at Utah Valley University. In his tenure (ninth season in 2025), he has compiled a career record of 100-65-22 (including 59-14-10 in WAC play as of late 2025), led the team to four consecutive WAC regular-season titles (2022–2025), two WAC Tournament titles (2017, 2020), multiple NCAA Tournament appearances (including the program's first win in 2020), and earned three WAC Coach of the Year honors (2022, 2024, 2025).

He has mentored future United States women's national soccer team players Alex Morgan and Christen Press in earlier roles.

== Soccer in the Sand ==
Lemay founded Soccer in the Sand LLC in 2006, starting with beach soccer tournaments in the San Diego area. It has grown into a nationwide series of 5v5 events in locations including Seaside, Oregon, Coronado, California, and Grand Haven, Michigan, often featuring skills clinics to promote beach soccer.

== Other ==
Lemay holds a United States Soccer Federation Class A license and is a FIFA-certified beach soccer coach.

== Personal life ==
Lemay resides in the Salt Lake City area and balances collegiate coaching with his beach soccer organization.
