= 2018 Western Athletic Conference softball tournament =

- Teams: 6
- Format: Double-elimination
- Finals site: New Mexico State Softball Complex; Las Cruces, NM
- Television: WAC Digital Network

The 2018 Western Athletic Conference softball tournament was held at New Mexico State Softball Complex on the campus of New Mexico State University in Las Cruces, New Mexico from May 9 through May 12, 2018. The winner received the conference's automatic bid to the 2018 NCAA Division I softball tournament. All games were streamed online on the WAC Digital Network with Adam Young and Mary Kay Mauro on the call.

== Tournament ==
Upper round 1
4	GCU	15
5	CSU Bakersfield	0_{(5)}
3	Seattle U	1
6	Kansas City	7
Lower round 1
3	Seattle U	4
4	GCU	7
5	CSU Bakersfield	3
2	Utah Valley	6 _{(9)}

Upper round 2
1	New Mexico State	10
4	GCU	1_{(5)}
2	Utah Valley	4
6	Kansas City	7
Lower round 2
4	GCU	18
2	Utah Valley	7 _{(8)}

Upper final
1	New Mexico State	14
6	Kansas City	3
Lower final
4	GCU	14
6	Kansas City	5 _{(5)}

Final
1	New Mexico State	9
4	GCU	7

- All times listed are Mountain Daylight Time.
