= Soccer in the Sand =

Series of beach soccer tournaments in the United States

- Sport: Beach soccer
- Founded: 2006
- Founder: Chris Lemay
- No. of teams: Varies by event
- Country: United States
- Website: https://www.soccerinthesand.com/

Soccer in the Sand is a series of beach soccer tournaments held at various beach locations in the United States. Founded in 2006 by Chris Lemay, the series emphasizes growing participation in beach soccer while supporting local communities through donations and partnerships with youth soccer clubs.

Tournaments typically feature small-sided games (usually 5v5 including goalkeepers), age- and gender-based divisions, skills clinics, and family-friendly beach activities. The series has donated over $280,000 to local organizations and hosted free clinics for thousands of participants.

== History ==
The series began in 2006 under founder Chris Lemay, who established Soccer in the Sand to promote beach soccer as an alternative to traditional grass-field play.

== Locations ==
Tournaments are held at beach venues across multiple states, with events scheduled from spring through summer. As of 2026, confirmed locations include:

- Coronado (San Diego), California
- Seaside, Oregon
- Grand Haven, Michigan
- Michigan City, Indiana
- Detroit, Michigan
- Chicago, Illinois
- Muskegon, Michigan

Earlier events have also taken place in locations such as Clearwater Beach, Florida; Cleveland, Ohio; and others, though the series has consolidated over time.

== Format ==
Tournaments are one- or two-day events with teams of up to 11 players (12 for coed), divided by age (based on the oldest player's birthdate) and gender. Females may play in male divisions, but males are restricted to male divisions.

Games are typically 5v5 (including goalkeeper), though some variations exist. Two-day events feature three 11-minute periods with short breaks; one-day events use two 12-minute halves. Points are awarded as 3 for a win, 1 for a tie, and 0 for a loss, with tiebreakers including head-to-head results, goal differential, or shootouts.

Kickoffs are determined by coin toss or rock-paper-scissors. Each team is guaranteed at least three games in pool play, followed by playoffs for top teams.

Many events include free skills clinics on the preceding Friday and community giveback initiatives.
