= 2015 Western Athletic Conference softball tournament =

Sports tournament

The 2015 Western Athletic Conference softball tournament was held at the New Mexico State softball complex on the campus of New Mexico State University in Las Cruces, New Mexico from May 7 through May 9, 2015. The tournament winner earned the Western Athletic Conference's automatic bid to the 2015 NCAA Division I softball tournament. All games were streamed online on the WAC Digital Network with Danny Mata, sports director of KVIA providing the call.

== Tournament ==
Upper round 1	Upper round 2	Upper final	Final
1	New Mexico State	13
4	Seattle	3	5	Utah Valley	5^{(5)}
5	Utah Valley	11^{(6)}	1	New Mexico State	2
3	Cal State Bakersfield	10^{(5)}
2	UMKC	7
3	Cal State Bakersfield	8
3	Cal State Bakersfield	4	10
1	New Mexico State	7	18^{(6)}
Lower round 1	Lower round 2	Lower round 3	Lower final
1	New Mexico State	18
4	Seattle	8	5	Utah Valley	3^{(5)}
2	UMKC	5	5	Utah Valley	9
4	Seattle	12

- All times listed are Mountain Daylight Time.
