= 2021 Western Athletic Conference softball tournament =

- Teams: 4
- Format: Double-elimination tournament
- Finals site: Logan Field; Seattle, Washington
- Champions: Seattle (2nd title)
- Winning coach: Geoff Hirai
- MVP: Carley Nance (Seattle)

The 2021 Western Athletic Conference softball tournament was held at Logan Field on the campus of Seattle University in Seattle, Washington from May 13 through May 15, 2021. The tournament was won by the Seattle Redhawks, who earned the Western Athletic Conference's automatic bid to the 2021 NCAA Division I softball tournament

== Tournament ==
=== Bracket ===
Thursday, May 13
1	New Mexico State	5
4	Utah Valley	6
Winner's bracket
2	Seattle	5
3	Grand Canyon	4
1	New Mexico State	6
3	Grand Canyon	2
Loser's bracket

Friday, May 14
4	Utah Valley	1
2	Seattle	5
1	New Mexico State	4
4	Utah Valley	3

Saturday, May 15
2	Seattle	7	–
1	New Mexico State	5	–
