= Karli White =

American soccer player

Personal information
- Full name: Karli White
- Date of birth: November 13, 1996 (age 29)
- Place of birth: Kirkland, Washington, U.S.
- Height: 1.62 m (5 ft 4 in)
- Position: Forward

Team information
- Current team: PEC Zwolle
- Number: 23
- 2009–2015: Crossfire Redmond
- 2011–2015: Mount Si High School

College career
Years	Team	Apps	(Gls)
2015–2016	Seattle Redhawks	41	(15)
2017–2019	Western Washington Vikings	43	(17)

Senior career*
Years	Team	Apps	(Gls)
2020	Jumonji Ventus		
2021–2022	PEC Zwolle	10	(2)

Managerial career
- 2022–: Seattle Pacific Falcons (assistant)
- * Club domestic league appearances and goals as of 04:00; 26 August 2022 (UTC)

Karli White (born 13 November 1996), is an American professional soccer player who last played as a forward for Eredivisie (women) club, PEC Zwolle.

== College career ==
White played collegiate soccer at Seattle University and Western Washington University.

=== Seattle Redhawks ===
White played for the Seattle Redhawks women's soccer team in her freshman and sophomore years. In her freshman year, White was named in the First Team All-Conference and the WAC All-Tournament Team. In 2016, during her sophomore years, White helped lead Seattle University to the 2016 WAC Women's Soccer Tournament championship.

=== Western Washington Vikings ===
White played for the Western Washington Vikings women's soccer team in her junior and senior years. During her junior year, White was named as the GNAC Tournament MVP. White was also named in the GNAC All-Conference First team (Newcomer of the Year), D2CCA All-West Region First team, and United Soccer Coaches All-West Region First team. In 2018, White did not play her senior year due to foot injury which made her eligible as a redshirt for the 2019 season. In her redshirt-senior year, White was named as the GNAC Player of the Year and the GNAC Tournament MVP. She helped lead Western Washington University to the finals of the NCAA Division 2 Women's Soccer Championship and to the 2019 GNAC Women's Soccer Tournament title.

== Club career ==
=== Youth ===
White had her youth career at FC Alliance and Crossfire Redmond

=== Jumonji Ventus ===
In 2020, White signed for Nadeshiko League Division 2 club, Jumonji Ventus.

=== PEC Zwolle ===
In September 2021, White signed for Eredivisie (women) club, PEC Zwolle. She made her league debut for the club in a 1–1 draw against Heerenveen, coming in as a substitute, replacing Jeva Walk in the 61st minute.

== International career ==
=== Philippines ===
White was included in the Philippines squad for a month-long training camp in Australia in April 2022.

== Coaching career ==
=== Seattle Pacific Falcons ===
In 2022, White started as an assistant coach for the women's soccer team of Seattle Pacific University.
