= 2023 WAC women's soccer tournament =

- Classification: Division I
- Teams: 6
- Matches: 5
- Attendance: 1,295
- Site: CBU Soccer Field; Riverside, California
- Champions: Grand Canyon (2nd title)
- Winning coach: Chris Cissell (2nd title)
- MVP: Gianna Gourley (Grand Canyon)
- Broadcast: ESPN+

2023 WAC women's soccer standings
	Conf.						Overall
Team	W		L		T	PCT	W		L		T	PCT
Utah Valley ‍†‍‍	7	–	0	–	2	.889	10	–	4	–	5	.658
California Baptist ‍‍‍	6	–	0	–	3	.833	11	–	2	–	6	.737
Seattle ‍‍‍	6	–	2	–	1	.722	10	–	9	–	2	.524
Grand Canyon ‍‍‡‍^{y}	5	–	1	–	3	.722	14	–	5	–	4	.696
Utah Tech ‍‍‍	3	–	2	–	4	.556	8	–	7	–	5	.525
Southern Utah ‍‍‍	3	–	5	–	1	.389	3	–	11	–	5	.289
Abilene Christian ‍‍‍	2	–	6	–	1	.278	7	–	9	–	2	.444
UT Rio Grande Valley ‍‍‍	1	–	6	–	2	.222	3	–	10	–	4	.294
Stephen F. Austin ‍‍‍	1	–	6	–	2	.222	2	–	14	–	2	.167
Tarleton State ‍‍‍	1	–	7	–	1	.167	4	–	12	–	3	.289
† – Conference champion ‡ – 2023 WAC Tournament champion y – Invited to the NCAA Tournament; As of December 5, 2023; Rankings from United Soccer Coaches Poll; Source: WAC

The 2023 Western Athletic Conference women's soccer tournament was the postseason women's soccer tournament for the Western Athletic Conference held from October 29 to November 4, 2023. The five-match tournament took place at CBU Soccer Field in Riverside, California on the campus of California Baptist University. The six-team single-elimination tournament consisted of three rounds based on seeding from regular-season divisional conference play. The defending champions were the New Mexico State Aggies. New Mexico State was unable to defend their title as they moved to Conference USA during the off-season. Grand Canyon would go on to defeat Seattle in the Final, 4–2 to win the tournament. This was the second WAC Tournament victory in Grand Canyon program history, both of which have come under head coach Chris Cissell. This was the second tournament title in three years for Grand Canyon. As tournament champions, Grand Canyon earned the WAC's automatic bid to the NCAA Tournament.

== Seeding ==
The top six teams from regular season play qualified for the 2023 Tournament. Teams were seeded based on regular season conference records and the top two seeds earned a bye into the semifinal round. No tiebreakers were required as each of the top six teams finished with unique conference records.

Seed	School	Conference Record	Points
1	Utah Valley	7–0–2	23
2	California Baptist	6–0–3	21
3	Seattle	6–2–1	20
4	Grand Canyon	5–1–3	18
5	Utah Tech	3–2–4	13
6	Southern Utah	3–5–1	10

== Bracket ==
First round Sunday, Oct. 29
4	Grand Canyon	3
5	Utah Tech	0
3	Seattle	2
6	Southern Utah	1

Semifinals; Wednesday, Nov. 1
1	Utah Valley	1
4	Grand Canyon	2
2	California Baptist	1
3	Seattle	2

Final; Sunday, Nov. 4
4	Grand Canyon	4
3	Seattle	2

== Matches ==
=== First round ===
October 29	#4 Grand Canyon	3–0	#5 Utah Tech	Riverside, CA
4:00 p.m. PT	Bekah Valdez 19'; Gianna Gourley 57', 76'; Magdalena Schwarz (yellow card) 87'	Report	(yellow card) 66' Kearney Hoggan	Stadium: CBU Soccer Field

October 29	#3 Seattle	2–1	#6 Southern Utah	Riverside, CA
7:00 p.m. PT	Caroline Penner 36'; Hallie Bergford 83'; Kacey LaBoda (yellow card) 89'	Report	49' Whitney Gardner	Stadium: CBU Soccer Field

=== Semifinals ===
November 1	#1 Utah Valley	1–2	#4 Grand Canyon	Riverside, CA
4:00 p.m. PT	Ruby Hladek 61'	Report	25' Utah Valley Own Goal; 88' Lindsey Prokop	Stadium: CBU Soccer Field; Attendance: 225

November 1	#2 California Baptist	1–2	#3 Seattle	Riverside, CA
7:00 p.m. PT	Lourdes Bosch (yellow card) 43'; Kaylee Hauck (yellow card) 65'; Sonja Lux 81' (pen.)	Report	35' Kait Raffensperger; (yellow card) 41' Jourdyn Curran; 58' Kaylee Coatney	Stadium: CBU Soccer Field; Attendance: 796

=== Final ===
November 4	#3 Seattle	2–4	#4 Grand Canyon	Riverside, CA
1:00 p.m. PT	Katie Piburn (yellow card) 18'; Kaylee Coatney 75'; Emma de la Cruz 77'	Report	21' Bekah Valdez; 53' Leah Pirro; 62' Gianna Gourley; 67' Maddie Brady; (yellow card) 86' Madison Hamm	Stadium: CBU Soccer Field; Attendance: 274

== Statistics ==
=== Goalscorers ===
There were 18 goals scored in 5 matches, for an average of 3.6 goals per match (as of November 5, 2023).

3 goals

- Gianna Gourley – Grand Canyon

2 goals

- Bekah Valedz – Grand Canyon
- Kaylee Coatney – Seattle

1 goal

- Sonja Lux – California Baptist
- Maddie Brady – Grand Canyon
- Leah Pirro – Grand Canyon
- Lindsey Prokop – Grand Canyon
- Hallie Bergford – Seattle
- Emma de la Cruz – Seattle
- Caroline Penner – Seattle
- Kait Raffensperger – Seattle
- Whitney Gardner – Southern Utah
- Ruby Hladek – Utah Valley

1 own goal

- Utah Valley (vs. Grand Canyon)

== All-Tournament team ==
Player	Team
Lourdes Bosch	California Baptist
**Gianna Gourley**	Grand Canyon
DeAira Jackson	Grand Canyon
Leah Pirro	Grand Canyon
Lindsey Prokop	Grand Canyon
Bekah Valdez	Grand Canyon
Kaylee Coatney	Seattle
Kassidy Kirgan	Seattle
Kacey La Boda	Seattle
Kait Raffensperger	Seattle
Ruby Hladek	Utah Valley

MVP in bold
