= 2016 WAC women's soccer tournament =

- Classification: Division I
- Teams: 6
- Matches: 5
- Site: Durwood Soccer Stadium; Kansas City, MO
- Champions: Seattle (3rd title)
- Winning coach: Julie Woodward (3rd title)
- MVP: Natasha Howe (Seattle Redhawks)
- Broadcast: WAC Digital Network (All Games)

2016 WAC women's soccer standings
	Conf.						Overall
Team	W		L		T	PCT	W		L		T	PCT
Seattle ‍†‍‡‍^{y}	7	–	0	–	0	1.000	14	–	6	–	1	.690
Cal State Bakersfield ‍‍‍	4	–	2	–	1	.643	8	–	10	–	2	.450
UMKC ‍‍‍	3	–	2	–	2	.571	8	–	10	–	4	.455
Grand Canyon* ‍‍‍	3	–	2	–	2	.571	7	–	9	–	2	.444
Utah Valley ‍‍‍	3	–	3	–	1	.500	10	–	8	–	2	.550
New Mexico State ‍‍‍	2	–	3	–	2	.429	5	–	13	–	2	.300
Texas–Rio Grande Valley ‍‍‍	2	–	5	–	0	.286	10	–	8	–	1	.553
Chicago State ‍‍‍	0	–	7	–	0	.000	1	–	16	–	0	.059
† – Conference champion ‡ – 2016 WAC Tournament champion y – Invited to the NCAA tournament * – Grand Canyon ineligible for postseason (D2 to D1 regulations); As of 2016-11-14; Rankings from NSCAA

The 2016 Western Athletic Conference women's soccer tournament is the postseason women's soccer tournament for the Western Athletic Conference held from November 3 to November 6, 2016. The five match tournament was held at Durwood Soccer Stadium in Kansas City. The six team single-elimination tournament consisted of three rounds based on seeding from regular season conference play. The defending champions were the Utah Valley Wolverines, who defeated the Seattle Redhawks 2–0 in the 2015 tournament.

== Bracket ==
First round Thursday, Nov. 3
4	Utah Valley	2
5	New Mexico State	0
3	UMKC	4
6	UTRGV	1

Semifinals; Friday, Nov. 4
1	Seattle	2
4	Utah Valley	1
2	CSU Bakersfield	0
3	UMKC	4

Final; Sunday, Nov. 6
1	Seattle	2
3	UMKC	1

== Schedule ==
=== First round ===
November 3, 2016	#4 Utah Valley	2–0	#5 New Mexico State	Kansas City, MO
4:00 p.m. CT	Lilly Weaver 12'; Sheridan Fox 59'	Report		Stadium: Durwood Soccer Stadium; Referee: Dion Telting

November 3, 2016	#3 UMKC	4–1	#6 UTRGV	Kansas City, MO
7:00 p.m. CT	Niekie Pellens 30' (pen.); Lilly Cobb 50'; Kara Priest 57'; Lexie Howard 71'	Report	Marcela Ramirez 78'	Stadium: Durwood Soccer Stadium; Referee: Allen Chapman

=== Semifinals ===
November 4, 2016	#1 Seattle	2–1	#4 Utah Valley	Kansas City, MO
4:00 p.m. CT	Natasha Howe 11'; Isabelle Butterfield 14'	Report	Sara Callister 72'	Stadium: Durwood Soccer Stadium; Referee: Allen Chapman

November 4, 2016	#2 CSU Bakersfield	0–4	#3 UMKC	Kansas City, MO
7:00 p.m. CT		Report	Emily Herndon 21', 49' (pen.); Niekie Pellens 40'; Abby Small 54'	Stadium: Durwood Soccer Stadium; Referee: Dion Telting

=== Final ===
November 6, 2016	#1 Seattle	2–1	#3 UMKC	Kansas City, MO
1:00 p.m. CT	Karli White 7'; Jessie Ray 71'	Report	Lexie Howard 6'	Stadium: Durwood Soccer Stadium; Attendance: 337; Referee: Christopher Calderon

== All-Tournament team ==
Player	Team	Position
Keneika Webster	CSU Bakersfield	DF
Haley Vicente	CSU Bakersfield	FW
Libby Weber	Utah Valley	MF
Linley Brown	Utah Valley	DF
Lexie Howard	UMKC	FW
Emily Herndon	UMKC	MF
Niekie Pellens	UMKC	DF
Karli White	Seattle	FW
Brie Hooks	Seattle	FW
Isabelle Butterfield	Seattle	FW
