= 2022 WAC women's soccer tournament =

- Classification: Division I
- Teams: 6
- Matches: 5
- Attendance: 1,321
- Site: Championship Field Stadium; Seattle, Washington
- Champions: New Mexico State (1st title)
- Winning coach: Rob Baarts (1st title)
- MVP: Makenna Gottschalk (New Mexico State)
- Broadcast: ESPN+

2022 WAC women's soccer standings
	Conf.						Overall
Team	W		L		T	PCT	W		L		T	PCT
Utah Valley ‍†‍‍^{y}	9	–	1	–	1	.864	14	–	5	–	3	.705
Seattle ‍‍‍	8	–	1	–	2	.818	11	–	6	–	3	.625
New Mexico St ‍‍‡‍^{y}	7	–	2	–	2	.727	13	–	5	–	3	.690
Utah Tech ‍‍‍	6	–	3	–	2	.636	10	–	6	–	2	.611
Grand Canyon ‍‍‍	6	–	4	–	1	.591	11	–	7	–	2	.600
California Baptist ‍‍‍	5	–	3	–	3	.591	8	–	5	–	5	.583
Stephen F. Austin ‍‍‍	5	–	6	–	0	.455	6	–	11	–	1	.361
Southern Utah ‍‍‍	4	–	5	–	2	.455	9	–	6	–	2	.588
Tarleton ‍‍‍	2	–	7	–	2	.273	6	–	9	–	3	.417
Sam Houston ‍‍‍	2	–	8	–	1	.227	3	–	11	–	2	.250
UTRGV ‍‍‍	1	–	7	–	3	.227	3	–	12	–	3	.250
Abilene Christian ‍‍‍	0	–	8	–	3	.136	4	–	10	–	4	.333
† – Conference champion ‡ – 2022 WAC Tournament champion y – Invited to the NCAA Tournament; As of December 6, 2022; Rankings from United Soccer Coaches Poll; Source:WAC

The 2022 Western Athletic Conference women's soccer tournament was the postseason women's soccer tournament for the Western Athletic Conference held from November 2 to November 6, 2022. The five-match tournament took place at Championship Field Stadium in Seattle, Washington on the campus of Seattle University. The six-team single-elimination tournament consisted of three rounds based on seeding from regular-season divisional conference play. The defending champions were the Grand Canyon. Grand Canyon was unable to defend their crown, falling 3–2 against Utah Valley in the Semifinal. New Mexico State would go on to defeat Utah Valley in the Final, 1–0 to win the tournament. This was the first WAC Tournament victory in New Mexico State program history as well as the first victory for head coach Rob Baarts. As tournament champions, New Mexico State earned the WAC's automatic bid to the NCAA Tournament.

== Seeding ==
The top six teams from regular season play qualified for the 2022 Tournament. Teams were seeded based on regular season conference records and the top two seeds earned a bye into the semifinal round. No tiebreakers were required as each of the top six teams finished with unique conference records.

Seed	School	Conference Record	Points
1	Utah Valley	9–1–1	28
2	Seattle	8–1–2	26
3	New Mexico State	7–2–2	23
4	Utah Tech	6–3–2	20
5	Grand Canyon	6–4–1	19
6	California Baptist	5–3–3	18

== Bracket ==
First round Wednesday, Nov. 2
3	New Mexico State (a.e.t.)	1
6	California Baptist	0
4	Utah Tech	0
5	Grand Canyon	3

Semifinals; Friday, Nov. 4
2	Seattle	0
3	New Mexico State	1
1	Utah Valley (a.e.t.)	3
5	Grand Canyon	2

Final; Sunday, Nov. 6
3	New Mexico State	1
1	Utah Valley	0

== Matches ==
=== First round ===
November 2	#3 New Mexico State	1–0 (a.e.t.)	#6 California Baptist	Seattle, WA
4:00 p.m. PT	Loma McNeese (yellow card) 30'; Landy Williams (yellow card) 68'; Sofia Beerworth 98'; Sydnee Johnson (yellow card) 106'	Report	(yellow card) 81' Ari Coronado	Stadium: Championship Field Stadium; Attendance: 124; Referee: Kelsey Harms; Assistant referees: Allen Johnson; Christopher Calderon; Fourth official: Allen Johnson

November 2	#4 Utah Tech	0–3	#5 Grand Canyon	Seattle, WA
7:00 p.m. PT		Report	32' Leah Pirro; 39' Ani Jensen; 81' Gianna Gourley; (yellow card) 90' Grace Bartlett	Stadium: Championship Field Stadium; Attendance: 214; Referee: Charlie Delgadillo; Assistant referees: Will Niccolls; Cephalon Quartson; Fourth official: Hunter Zachwieja

=== Semifinals ===
November 4	#2 Seattle	0–1	#3 New Mexico State	Seattle, WA
4:00 p.m. PT	Kacey LaBoda (yellow card) 18' (yellow-red card) 85'	Report	(yellow card) 45' Landy Williams; 85' (pen.) Tati Jerman	Stadium: Championship Field Stadium; Attendance: 370; Referee: Charlie Delgadillo; Assistant referees: Jesus Mejia; Andrew Rogers; Fourth official: Baboucarr Jallow

November 4	#1 Utah Valley	3–2 (a.e.t.)	#5 Grand Canyon	Seattle, WA
7:00 p.m. PT	Heather Stainbrook (yellow card) 29'; Jenna Shepherd (yellow card) 53', (goal) 84'; Faith Webber 64', 108'	Report	21', 22' Bekah Valdez; (yellow card) 53' Leah Pirro; (yellow card) 96' (yellow-red card) 104' AJ Loera	Stadium: Championship Field Stadium; Attendance: 448; Referee: Kelsey Harms; Assistant referees: Chris Turner; Aidan Velasco; Fourth official: Raymond Moffat Jr.

=== Final ===
November 6	#1 Utah Valley	0–1	#3 New Mexico State	Seattle, WA
1:00 p.m. PT	Faith Webber (yellow card) 79'; Megan Sullivan (yellow card) 90'	Report	44' Tati Jerman; (yellow card) 77' Team; (yellow card) 89' Sofia Beerworth	Stadium: Championship Field Stadium; Attendance: 165; Referee: Karen Callado; Assistant referees: Will Niccolls; Baboucarr Jallow; Fourth official: Juan Colazo

== Statistics ==
=== Goalscorers ===
There were 11 goals scored in 5 matches, for an average of 2.2 goals per match (as of November 6, 2022).

2 goals

- Bekah Valdez – Grand Canyon
- Tati Jerman – New Mexico State
- Faith Webber – Utah Valley

1 goal

- Gianna Gourley – Grand Canyon
- Ani Jensen – Grand Canyon
- Leah Pirro – Grand Canyon
- Sofia Beerworth – New Mexico State
- Jenna Shepherd – Utah Valley

== All-Tournament team ==
Player	Team
Sofia Beerworth	New Mexico State
**Makenna Gottschalk**	New Mexico State
Xitlaly Hernandez	New Mexico State
Tati Jerman	New Mexico State
Loma McNeese	New Mexico State
Jenna Shepherd	Utah Valley
Heather Stainbrook	Utah Valley
Faith Webber	Utah Valley
Gianna Gourley	Grand Canyon
Leah Pirro	Grand Canyon
Noa Schumacher	California Baptist

MVP in bold
