= Utah Tech Trailblazers =

Sports teams of Utah Tech University

- University: Utah Tech University
- Nickname: Trailblazers (formerly Red Storm (2009-2016), Rebels (1952-2009)
- NCAA: Division I
- Conference: Big Sky; Mountain West (baseball, men's soccer)
- Athletic director: Ken Beazer
- Location: St. George, Utah
- Varsity teams: 15 (6 men's and 9 women's)
- Football stadium: Greater Zion Stadium
- Basketball arena: Burns Arena
- Baseball stadium: Bruce Hurst Field
- Colors: Red, navy blue, and white
- Mascot: Brooks the Bison (formerly Rodney the Rebel)
- Website: utahtechtrailblazers.com

The Utah Tech Trailblazers, formerly known as the Dixie State Trailblazers, the Dixie State Red Storm and the Dixie State Rebels, are the 15 varsity athletic teams that represent Utah Tech University (formerly Dixie State University and similar names), located in St. George, Utah, in NCAA Division I intercollegiate sports. The Trailblazers currently compete as members of the Big Sky Conference; in football, the school competes in the second level of D-I football, the Football Championship Subdivision (FCS), formerly in the United Athletic Conference (UAC). The UAC was formed after the 2022 football season as a merger of the football leagues of the WAC and the Atlantic Sun Conference (then officially the ASUN Conference). In two sports not sponsored by the Big Sky, baseball and men's soccer, Utah Tech will become an affiliate of the Mountain West Conference starting in 2026–27.

Utah Tech began competing in NCAA Division II in the 2006–07 academic year (as Dixie State) after being a member of the National Junior College Athletic Association. From 1952 to 2009, as part of a general theme of Confederacy symbolism for the university, the school's nickname was the "Rebels", which was changed to the "Red Storm" in 2009. In 2016, the nickname was changed again to "Trailblazers".

On January 11, 2019, the university announced that it would move its sports program up to NCAA Division I by joining the WAC for all sports except football, which played as an FCS independent for one year before joining DSU's other sports in the WAC after it reinstated football for the 2021 season. The transition to D-I, which began upon the school's arrival in the WAC on July 1, 2020, will take four years; during this time, the Trailblazers will be ineligible for NCAA-sanctioned postseason play in any of their current sports.

On November 10, 2021, the Utah legislature approved the rebranding of the school from Dixie State University to Utah Tech University. The publicly presented name change occurred in May 2022, with the change planned to take legal effect on July 1, 2022.

On June 25, 2025, the school announced that they would depart the WAC for the Big Sky Conference alongside fellow WAC member and rival Southern Utah, joining the Big Sky at the start of the 2026–27 academic year.

== Sports sponsored ==
Men's sports	Women's sports
Baseball	Basketball
Basketball	Cross country
Cross Country	Golf
Football	Soccer
Golf	Softball
Soccer	Swimming and diving
	Tennis
	Track and field
	Volleyball

== Club sports ==
=== Pickleball ===
The Utah Tech pickleball club has developed into one of the most successful collegiate pickleball programs in the United States. The team finished as runner-up at the 2022 DUPR Pickleball Collegiate National Championship, falling to North Carolina in the championship match.

Utah Tech won the 2024 Collegiate National Championship, marking the program’s first national title. The team followed this achievement by capturing the 2025 Collegiate Pickleball World Championship, establishing itself as a dominant force in collegiate pickleball.

In addition to its competitive success, Utah Tech became the first—and as of 2025, the only—collegiate pickleball program to receive a professional sponsorship from Selkirk Sport.
