= Utah Valley Wolverines =

Athletic teams of Utah Valley University

- University: Utah Valley University
- Nickname: Wolverines
- NCAA: Division I
- Conference: Big West (primary); Big 12 (wrestling)
- Athletic director: Dr. Jared Sumsion
- Location: Orem, Utah
- Varsity teams: 16 (8 men's and 8 women's)
- Basketball arena: UCCU Center
- Baseball stadium: UCCU Ballpark
- Softball stadium: Wolverine Stadium
- Soccer stadium: UCCU Stadium
- Outdoor track and field venue: Hal Wing Track and Field
- Volleyball arena: Lockhart Arena
- Colors: Green and white
- Mascot: Willy the Wolverine
- Fight song: Stand Up and Cheer
- Website: gouvu.com

The Utah Valley Wolverines represent Utah Valley University in NCAA Division I collegiate athletics and sponsor 16 sporting programs. The Wolverines participate in the Big West Conference. The school mascot is the Wolverine, and the colors are green and white. Since 2017, the UVU student section is called The Den, having previously been referred to as The Mawl.

== Conference affiliation ==
Utah Valley State College was originally a member of the NJCAA and moved to NCAA Division I athletics in 2003. Utah Valley is the only school in NCAA history to move directly from the NJCAA to Division I. The school joined the Great West Conference in 2008 and was renamed to Utah Valley University in the same year. The Wolverines became a full Division I member in the 2009–10 season following a five-year transition period as a Division I independent.

WAC logo in Utah Valley colors

They won the GWC Commissioner's Cup each year they have competed in the conference. Each year the Cup is awarded to the institution that performed best overall in GWC-sponsored sports. They joined the Western Athletic Conference July 1, 2013.

UVU officially accepted an invitation to join the Western Athletic Conference in all sports (with the exception of wrestling) on October 9, 2012. They became a full member on July 1, 2013, and began WAC play in the 2013–14 school year. With this move, UVU also added men's soccer in 2014. The school's wrestling team remained a member of the Western Wrestling Conference (WWC) through the 2014–15 school year. The WWC then disbanded when all of its members accepted an offer of single-sport membership in the Big 12 Conference.

In March 2025, both UVU and fellow WAC conference member California Baptist received an invitation to join the Big West Conference beginning in the 2026–27 academic year.

== Varsity sports ==
Utah Valley University currently sponsors eight men's and eight women's teams in NCAA sanctioned sports:

Men's sports	Women's sports
Baseball	Basketball
Basketball	Cross country
Cross country	Golf
Golf	Soccer
Soccer	Softball
Track and field^{†}	Track and field^{†}
Wrestling	Volleyball
† – Track and field includes both indoor and outdoor

=== Baseball ===
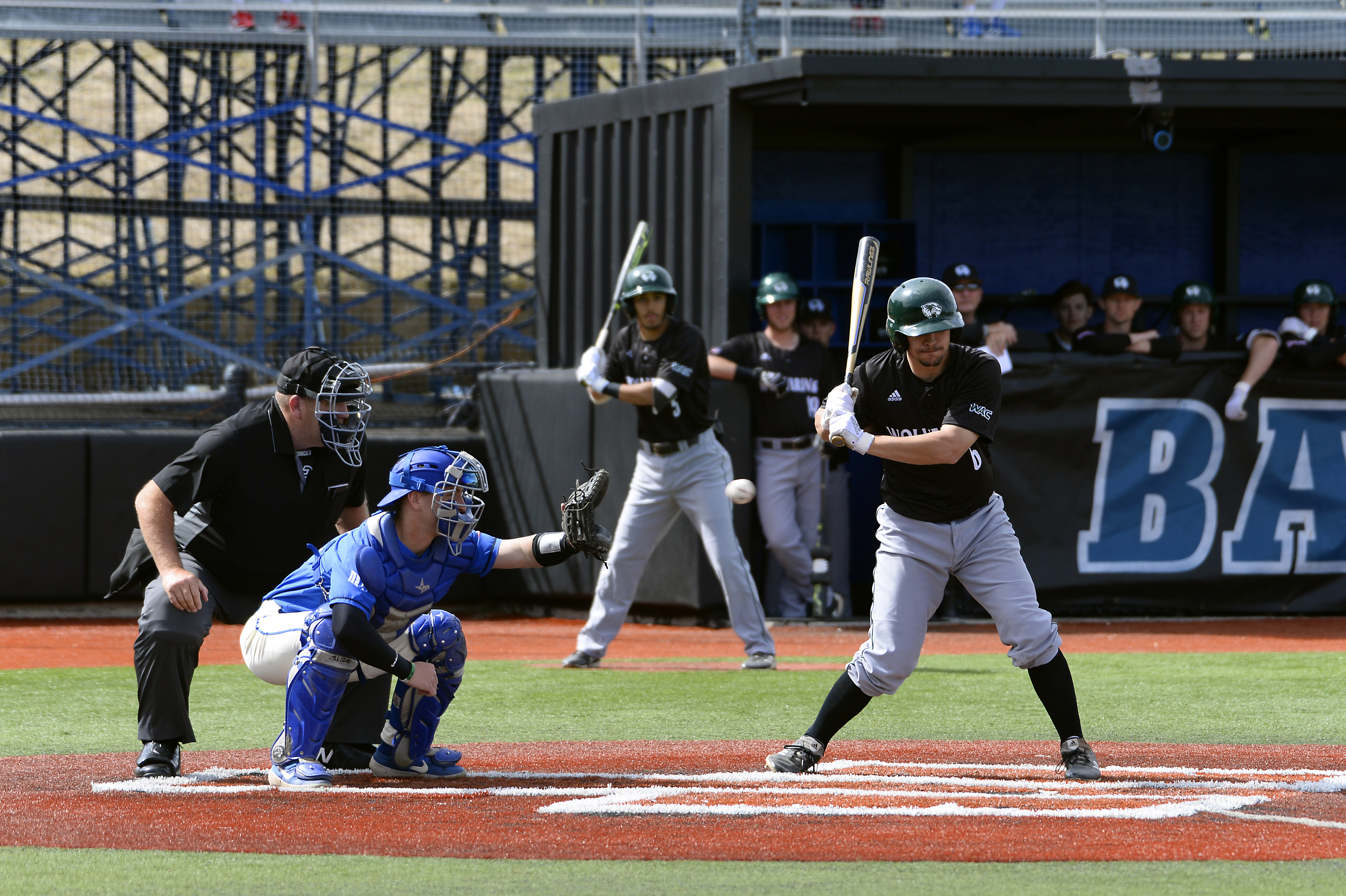
A Wolverines baseball player takes a turn at bat against Air Force in 2019.

The baseball team plays at UCCU Ballpark, a 2,500-seat facility (3,000 additional fans can sit on a grass berm that wraps around third base and left field, bringing total capacity to 5,500) that opened on March 25, 2005. UCCU Ballpark was also the home of the Orem Owlz, a minor-league affiliate of Los Angeles Angels of Anaheim, that competed in the Pioneer Baseball League.

=== Men’s basketball ===
The Wolverines play their home basketball games in the 8,500-seat Utah Community Credit Union Center. The men's basketball team has played in the National Invitational Tournament four times, with the most recent appearance in 2026. They have also won five Western Athletic Conference regular season titles, with those coming in 2014, 2021, 2023, 2025, and 2026. The team is coached by Todd Phillips.

=== Women’s basketball ===
The Wolverines play their home basketball games in the 8,500-seat Utah Community Credit Union Center and in the 2,000 seat Lockhart Arena. The women's basketball team has played once in the NCAA Tournament in 2021 and twice in the Women's National Invitation Tournament, with the most recent appearance in 2026. They have also won one Great West conference regular season title and one Great West tournament title. The team is coached by Dan Nielson.

=== Cross country ===
The Utah Valley Wolverines cross country program operates as a combined men’s and women’s system under the unified leadership of longtime head coach Scott Houle, who has directed the teams since the 2004–05 season. The men's cross country team has captured six conference championships, while the women's squad has secured four conference team titles. The women’s team reached program milestones by securing back-to-back team bids to the NCAA Cross Country Championships in 2022 and 2023, anchored by Everlyn Kemboi, who became the first cross country All-American in school history in 2022. On the men's side, standout runners Joshua McCabe (a two-time qualifier in 2010 and 2012), Tyson Lambert (2017), and Britain Reynolds (2020–21) earned individual national qualification spots to the NCAA Championship meet. In 2026, the men's team was ranked in the top 25 for the first time.

=== Golf ===
The Utah Valley Wolverines men's and women's golf programs are led by head coaches Chris Curran and Juli Erekson, respectively. The men's program has achieved significant milestones under Curran, who is the winningest coach in program history with nine team titles and was named a conference Coach of the Year in 2023. That same season, the men's team reached its highest national ranking ever at 44th and earned a spot in its first postseason national tournament at the Golfweek National Golf Invitational (NGI). Notable individual accomplishments include Mason Casper (2012, 2013) and Brady McKinlay (2023) qualifying for NCAA Regionals, while Gabe Lysen and Dane Huddleston both captured individual conference tournament titles.

The women's program has seen rising success, including winning its first home tournament title at the Wolverine Invitational. Prior to Erekson's tenure, the women's team achieved a program-best third-place finish at the conference tournament under longtime coach Dr. Sue Nyhus. A historic milestone for the women's program came when Victoria Estrada captured the program's first-ever individual conference championship title, making her Utah Valley's first female individual NCAA regional qualifier.

=== Soccer ===
The men's and women's soccer teams play at UCCU Stadium, a new stadium built upon the existing Clyde Field, which opened for the 2025–26 season. UCCU Stadium seats 3,000 and was constructed at a cost of $30 million. The women's team has been coached by Chris Lemay since 2017. During their time in the WAC, the program captured five regular-season championships (2020, 2022, 2023, 2024, 2025) and won three WAC Tournament titles (2015, 2017, 2020), leading to five all-time NCAA Tournament appearances (2015, 2017, 2020, 2022, and 2025). The program made history during the 2020 tournament by securing its first-ever NCAA postseason victory, and further cemented its competitive reputation in 2022 by earning the program's first at-large bid to the tournament. The women's soccer team set a school and facility record attendance of 4,742 fans during a home match against cross-town rival BYU on September 3, 2023.

The men's team is coached by Michael Chesler, who took over the program ahead of the 2026 season following a five-season tenure (2021–2025) by former U.S. Men's National Team and Real Salt Lake star Kyle Beckerman. The program has won one WAC regular-season championship in 2016. Despite the program's relatively short history since its inception under founding coach Greg Maas, the Wolverines have earned one all-time NCAA Tournament appearance, capturing a historic at-large postseason bid in 2015 in their second year of competitive play.

=== Softball ===
The softball team has played at Wolverine Field located west of the UCCU Center since 1996. In 2000, the Wolverines won the NJCAA national title. The Wolverine softball team set an all time attendance record of 575 spectators on March 24, 2026 versus BYU. The team is coached by Cody Thomson.

=== Track and field ===
The Track and Field team for Utah Valley competes at Hal Wing Track and Field. The Head coach of the track team is Scott Houle. Under Coach Houle the team has won 31 conference championships, had 12 second-place finishes, and he has won 31 coach of the year awards. The team has also had 28 individual NCAA Regional Qualifiers and had 51 Individual events qualified to the NCAA Regional Championships. There has also be 23 USTFCCCA All-Academic individuals as well. So far the track team has had 4 All-Americans, 3 in outdoor and 1 in indoor.

=== Women's volleyball ===
The Wolverines play their home volleyball matches in the 2,000 seat Lockhart Arena. The women's volleyball team has played three times in the NCAA Tournament in 2020, 2021 and 2025. They have also won two Great West conference regular season titles in 2011 and 2012 and one Western Athletic Conference regular season title in 2025. The team has been coached by Sam Atoa since 2003.

=== Wrestling ===
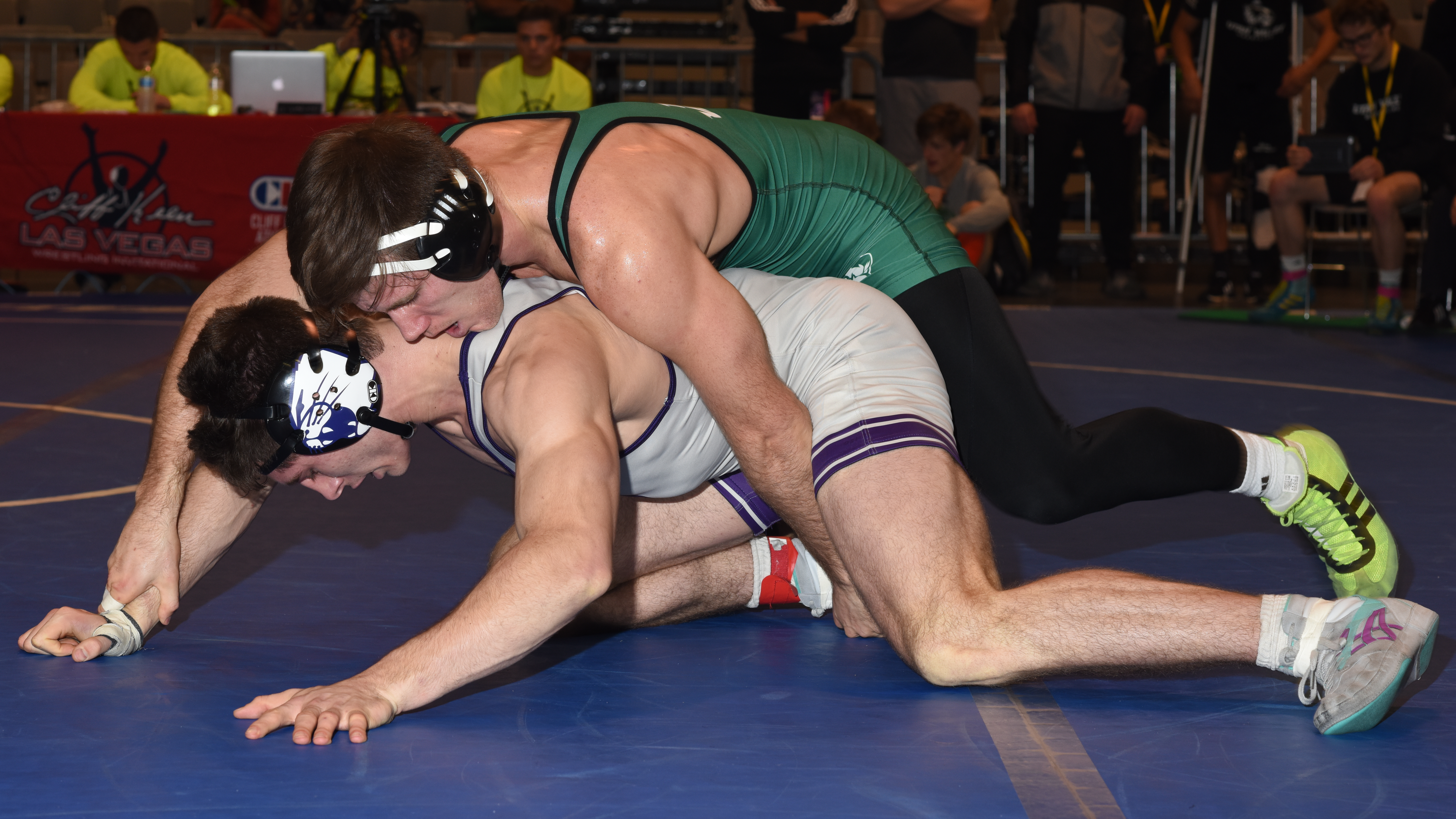
A Wolverines wrestler competes with a Northwestern athlete at an invitational tournament in 2019.

Utah Valley University's wrestling team remained a member of the Western Wrestling Conference (WWC) through the 2014–15 school year. The WWC then disbanded when all of its members accepted an offer of single-sport membership in the Big 12 Conference. UVU was led by Coach Greg Williams for 18 seasons before his retirement in 2024. UVU announced the hire of New Head Coach Adam Hall, who was previously the Associate Head Coach at NC State. Hall competed for Boise State University, where he was an All-American.

== Non-varsity sports ==
The school also fields several non-varsity teams including, men's ice hockey, men's volleyball, men's lacrosse, and men's and women's rugby.

The Men's Lacrosse Program competes in the MCLA, in the Rocky Mountain Lacrosse Conference. Since 2019 the program has seen a meteoric rise, most recently winning the RMLC in 2023 and making a run to the MCLA national tournament's quarterfinals. In 2024 they made a Cinderella run as the #14 overall seed to the MCLA national championship, where they lost to the #1 overall seed BYU. In 2025 the Wolverines made the national tournament yet again, this time as the #2 overall seed. They would make it to the semifinals before losing to the national runner-up, Georgia Tech.

The men's hockey program was renewed in 2016, originally starting as a business student’s capstone project. After the first two seasons of the revived program, major changes were made to help facilitate on campus growth and the success of the team. The team currently plays as an ACHA Division II member, with short term goals of advancing to ACHA Division I. There is tremendous interest among the student body with the ACHA Hockey team bringing close to capacity crowds several times a season. All games and practices are held at Peaks Ice Arena in Provo, Utah. In addition to this ACHA program, the athletic department at UVU has been pursuing adding NCAA Division I Men’s and Women’s hockey to campus. A feasibility study was completed, the results of which showed tremendous potential for a successful program. Currently, the school is working on efforts to raise the funds necessary to start and sustain the program for five years. The school has plans to construct a 5,000–7,000 seat arena on the newly acquired Geneva Campus 10 minutes away from main campus UVU. The initial target was to have a team competing by the 2027 season start. However, due to COVID-19 and financial woes it has been pushed to 2030.

== Rivalries ==
Since its move to Division I, UVU has maintained rivalries with the BYU Cougars, Utah Tech Trailblazers, and Southern Utah Thunderbirds.

=== UCCU Crosstown Clash ===
UVU and BYU are separated by just 3.4 miles from each other on University Parkway. The schools meet across men's and women's basketball, women's soccer, volleyball, baseball, and softball. Whilst BYU dominated the rivalry early on, the Wolverines won their most recent two games against BYU in men's basketball, and UVU's women's soccer program upset the Cougars in 2022 in Provo.

=== Old Hammer Rivalry ===
Utah Valley and Utah Tech have had rivalry meetings since both schools were at the junior college level. When Utah Tech announced they would be joining Division I in the Western Athletic Conference, the schools announced they would renew the Old Hammer Rivalry as they would now be conference foes. The schools match up in men's and women's soccer, volleyball, men's and women's basketball, softball, and baseball.

=== Emerging rivalries ===
Whilst not official, the Wolverines have seen an emerging in-state rivalry with the Southern Utah Thunderbirds (particularly in men's basketball) as the two schools were conference rivals in the WAC from 2022 to 2026.

The Wolverines are also seeing a slowly emerging rivalry with the California Baptist Lancers, which will be strengthened as the two schools moved together to the Big West Conference together starting in the 2026–27 season. The two schools also both compete as affiliates in the Big 12 for Wrestling.

== Alumni ==
- Christopher Fogt – Olympic silver medalist in four-man Bobsleigh at the 2014 Winter Olympics
- Akwasi Frimpong – Dutch-Ghanaian sprinter, bobsledder and skeleton athlete who competed in the 2018 Winter Olympics
- Caleb Furnell – American bobsled racer at the 2026 Winter Olympics
- Matt Gay – Professional football player for Las Vegas Raiders of the NFL (two seasons at UVU before transfer to University of Utah)
- Travis Hansen – Former basketball player for the Atlanta Hawks of the NBA
- Mitch Jones – Former baseball player for the Los Angeles Dodgers of the MLB
- Michael McDonald – Former basketball player for the Charlotte Hornets of the NBA
- Kam Mickolio – Former baseball player for the Baltimore Orioles of the MLB
- Noelle Pikus-Pace – American skeleton racer and silver medalist at the 2014 Winter Olympics
- Ronnie Price – Former basketball player for the Utah Jazz of the NBA
- Paxton Schultz – Professional baseball player for the Washington Nationals of the MLB
- Heather Stainbrook – Professional soccer player for the Washington Spirit of the NWSL
- Faith Webber – Professional soccer player for Sydney FC of the A-League Women
