= Summit League men's soccer tournament =

- Sport: College soccer
- Conference: Summit League
- Number of teams: 6
- Format: Single-elimination
- Current location: Campus Sites
- Played: 1994–present
- Last contest: 2026
- Current champion: Omaha (3rd title)
- Most championships: Denver (9 titles)
- TV partner: Midco
- Official website: thesummitleague.org/msoc

The Summit League men's soccer tournament is the conference championship tournament in soccer for the Summit League. The tournament has been held every year in November since 1994.

It is played under a single-elimination format, and seeding is based on regular season records. The winner, declared conference champion, receives the conference's automatic bid to the NCAA Division I men's soccer championship.

In 2024, the tournament was not played and was instead replaced by a championship game including the top two finishing teams in conference play. In 2025, the Summit League restored the four-team tournament, and this time it will be hosted at campus sites. Starting in 2026, the tournament will expand to a six-team tournament. At the time, this included all league teams.

Denver is the most winning team of the competition with 9 titles, while the current member with the most titles is Kansas City (4).

== Champions ==
=== Finals ===
Key

- (1) – Title number
- a.e.t. – Match went to extra time
- p – Match decided by a penalty shootout after extra time
- – Winning team won regular season

=== Details ===
Ed.	Year	Champion	Score	Runner-up	Venue	City	Tournament MVP
1	1994	Central Connecticut (1)	2–0	Buffalo	UB Stadium	Buffalo, NY	Everton Barrington (CCSU)
2	1995	Central Connecticut (2)	3–0	Western Illinois	MacKenzie Field	Macomb, IL	Stephen Yanosy (CCSU)
3	1996	Valparaiso (1)	4–2	Central Connecticut	Greene Stadium	Washington, DC	Tony Dal Santo (VALPO)
4	1997	Howard (1)	2–1	Central Connecticut	n/i	Valparaiso, IN	Mike Lawrence (HOW)
5	1998	Howard (2)	4–1	Kansas City	n/i	Valparaiso, IN	Greg Simmonds (HOW)
6	1999	Oral Roberts (1)	2–1 (a.e.t.)	IU Indy	Carroll Stadium	Indianapolis, IN	Trey Vaut (ORU)
7	2000	IU Indy (1)	2–1 (a.e.t.)	Oakland	MacKenzie Field	Macomb, IL	Armando Femia (IU)
8	2001	Kansas City (1)	2–1	IU Indy	ORU Soccer Field	Tulsa, OK	Beau Williams (KC)
9	2002	Oakland (1)	3–0	Western Illinois	Oakland Field	Rochester, MI	not awarded
10	2003	Kansas City (2)	2–1	Oakland	Oakland Field	Rochester, MI	not awarded
11	2004	Western Illinois (1)	4–0	Oral Roberts	MacKenzie Field	Macomb, IL	Nowaf Jaman (WIU)
12	2005	Western Illinois (2)	4–3 (a.e.t.)	Oakland	Durwood Stadium	Kansas, MO	Nick Bohnenkamp (WIU)
13	2006	Western Illinois (3)	2–0	Kansas City	Oakland Field	Rochester, MI	Matt Wieclaw (WIU)
14	2007	Oakland (2)	2–0	IU Indy	Carroll Stadium	Indianapolis, IN	Michael Reyes (OU)
15	2008	Kansas City (3)	1–1 (4–3 p)	Oakland	Oakland Field	Rochester, MI	Ken Cooper (KC)
16	2009	Western Illinois (4)	1–0	Kansas City	Oakland Field	Rochester, MI	Stephen Paterson (WIU)
17	2010	Oakland (3)	2–0	Oral Roberts	Oakland Field	Rochester, MI	Jon Evans (OU)
18	2011	Western Illinois (5)	2–1	Oral Roberts	Durwood Stadium	Kansas, MO	Charlie Bales (WIU)
19	2012	Western Illinois (6)	3–1	Oakland	MacKenzie Field	Macomb, IL	Nathan Bruinsma (WIU)
20	2013	Denver (1)	1–0	Western Illinois	MacKenzie Field	Macomb, IL	Reid Hukari (DU)
21	2014	Denver (2)	3–1	Western Illinois	CIBER Field	Denver, CO	Taylor Hunter (DU)
22	2015	Denver (3)	2–0	Oral Roberts	CIBER Field	Denver, CO	Dan Jackson (DU)
23	2016	Denver (4)	2–1	Omaha	CIBER Field	Denver, CO	Andre Shinyashiki (DU)
24	2017	Omaha (1)	1–1 (9–8 p)	Denver	Caniglia Field	Omaha, NE	Emmanuel Hamzat (UNO)
25	2018	Denver (5)	1–0	Omaha	CIBER Field	Denver, CO	Scott DeVoss (DU)
26	2019	Denver (6)	1–0	Omaha	CIBER Field	Denver, CO	Preston Judd (DU)
–	2020	(No tournament held due to COVID-19 pandemic)					
27	2021	Denver (7)	1–1 (3–2 p)	Oral Roberts	MacKenzie Field	Macomb, IL	Kobe Gray (DU)
28	2022	Denver (8)	3–0	Kansas City	CIBER Field	Denver, CO	Isaac Nehme (DU)
29	2023	Omaha (2)	2–0	Kansas City	Case Soccer Complex	Tulsa, OK	Nathanel Sallah (UNO)
30	2024 (Note: The 2024 tournament was held as a title match, since only 5 teams participated in league play.)	Kansas City (4)	2–1	Denver	CIBER Field	Denver, CO	Julien Le Bourdoulous (KC)
31	2025	Denver (9)	4–2	Kansas City	Campus Sites		Keegan Kelly (DU)
32	2026	Omaha (3)	4–2	St. Thomas	Campus Sites		Italo Jenkins (UNO)

== Performance by school ==
School	Titles	Winning years
Denver	9	2013, 2014, 2015, 2016, 2018, 2019, 2021, 2022, 2025
Western Illinois	6	2004, 2005, 2006, 2009, 2011, 2012
Kansas City (Note: On July 1, 2019, the University of Missouri–Kansas City's athletic program rebranded under the new name Kansas City Roos)	4	2001, 2003, 2008, 2024
Oakland	3	2002, 2007, 2010
Omaha	3	2017, 2023, 2026
Central Connecticut	2	1994, 1995
Howard	2	1997, 1998
IUPUI	1	2000
Oral Roberts	1	1999
Valparaiso^{1}	1	1996
Total (all schools)	32	

Notes

- Italics indicate a school that is no longer a conference member
- ^{1} no longer sponsor men's soccer
