= Summit League men's soccer individual awards =

Coaches and media of the Summit League bestow the following individual awards at the end of each college soccer season.

== Player of the Year ==
- 1984: Albert Adade, Cleveland State
- 1985: Larry Pretto, Eastern Illinois
- 1986: Ken Dugan, Western Illinois
- 1987: Ted Eck, Western Illinois
- 1988: Garry Laidlaw, Eastern Illinois
- 1989: Nick Stavrou, Cleveland State
- 1990: Nick Stavrou, Cleveland State
- 1991: Ken Pryor, Akron
- 1992: Tim Dunne, Green Bay
- 1993: Tony Sanneh, Milwaukee
- 1994: Everton Barrington, Central Connecticut
- 1995: Steve Jarvis, Central Connecticut
- 1996: Mike Anderson, UMKC
- 1997: Greg Simmonds, Howard
- 1998: J. J. Ruane, Valparaiso
- 1999: Erik Kuster, UMKC
- 2000: Troy Markin, Western Illinois
- 2001: Larry Scheller, UMKC
- 2002: Philip Braathen, Oakland

=== Offensive Player of the Year ===
- 2003: Trey Vaut, Oral Roberts
- 2004: Dave Leung, Oral Roberts
- 2005: Dave Leung, Oral Roberts
- 2006: Matt Wieclaw, Western Illinois
- 2007: Vangel Nacovski, IUPUI
- 2008: Brian Harris, UMKC
- 2009: Bryan Pérez, UMKC
- 2010: John Bayron Sosa, UMKC
- 2011: Max Touloute, Purdue Fort Wayne
- 2012: Kyle Bethel, Oakland
- 2013: Zach Bolden, Denver
- 2014: Johnny Chavez, Oral Roberts
- 2015: Drew Whalen, Western Illinois
- 2016: Fazlo Alihodzic, Omaha
- 2017: Andre Shinyashiki, Denver
- 2018: Andre Shinyashiki, Denver
- 2019: Tanguy Guerineau, Oral Roberts
- 2020: Dante Brigida, Oral Roberts
- 2021: Dante Brigida, Oral Roberts
- 2022: Felipe D'Agnostini, Oral Roberts
- 2023: Luis Flores, Oral Roberts
- 2024: Elie Kisoka, Kansas City
- 2025: Kyle McGowan, Denver
- 2026: Italo Jenkins, Omaha

=== Midfielder of the Year ===
- 2022: Ben Smith, Denver
- 2023: Sam Basset, Denver
- 2024: Sam Basset, Denver
- 2025: Rich Monath, Delaware
- 2026: Mark Ramarola, Kansas City

=== Defensive Player of the Year ===
- 2003: Jason Perry, Oakland
- 2004: Jeff Wiese, Oakland
- 2005: Jeff Wiese, Oakland
- 2006: Stephen Paterson, Western Illinois
- 2007: Ian Daniel, Oakland
- 2008: Steve Clark, Oakland
- 2009: Mitch Hildebrandt, Oakland
- 2010: Brian Quintana, UMKC
- 2011: Charlie Bales, Western Illinois
- 2012: John Timm, Oakland
- 2013: Theodor Remman, Denver
- 2014: Charlie Bales, Western Illinois
- 2015: Reagan Dunk, Denver
- 2016: Reagan Dunk, Denver
- 2017: Scott DeVoss, Denver
- 2018: Scott DeVoss, Denver
- 2019: Paul Kirdorf, Western Illinois
- 2020: Fitzroy Cummings, Omaha
- 2021: Liam Johnson, Denver
- 2022: Ronan Wynne, Denver
- 2023: Jason Belloli, Denver
- 2024: Ronan Wynne, Denver
- 2025: Trevor Wright, Denver
- 2026: Bryson Gosch, Kansas City

=== Goalkeeper of the Year ===
- 2012: Eduardo Cortes, IUPUI
- 2013: Oliver Brown, Denver
- 2014: Yves Dietrich, Western Illinois
- 2015: Dan Jackson, Denver
- 2016: Nick Gardner, Denver
- 2017: Mike Novotny, Eastern Illinois
- 2018: Will Palmquist, Denver
- 2019: Miles Motakef, Oral Roberts
- 2020: Cooper Clark, Kansas City
- 2021: Cooper Clark, Kansas City
- 2022: Jeremy Coste, Oral Roberts
- 2023: Isaac Nehme, Denver
- 2024: Isaac Nehme, Denver
- 2025: Isaac Nehme, Denver
- 2026: Moritz Krenc, St. Thomas

=== Newcomer of the Year ===
- 1992: Tim Dunne, Green Bay
- 1993: Brad McTighe, Eastern Illinois
- 1994: Joe House, Quincy
- 1995: David Gee, SIU Edwardsville
- 1996: Mike Lawrence, Howard
- 1997: Steve Butcher, Buffalo
- 1998: Scott Daly, Valparaiso
- 1999: Brandon Gibbs, UMKC
- 2000: Justin Langan, Western Illinois
- 2001: Sun Potter, Oral Roberts
- 2002: Jeff Wiese, Oakland
- 2003: Miguel Menduina, Oral Roberts
- 2004: Vangel Nacovski, IUPUI
- 2005: Carlos Pinto, Oral Roberts
- 2006: Martin Browne Jr., Western Illinois
- 2007: Martin Sandell, Oakland
- 2008: Tom Catalano, Oakland
- 2009: David Sarabia, UMKC
- 2010: Jeff Keyler, IUPUI
- 2011: Jordan Rideout, UMKC
- 2012: Kyle Bethel, Oakland
- 2013: Christian Garcia, Omaha
- 2014: Uriel Macias, IUPUI
- 2015: Andre Shinyashiki, Denver
- 2016: Emmanuel Hamzat, Omaha
- 2017: Jacob Stensson, Denver
- 2018: Callum Stretch, Denver
- 2019: Reed Berry, Oral Roberts
- 2020: Hugo Kametani, Omaha
- 2021: Felipe D’Agostini, Oral Roberts
- 2022: Isaac Nehme, Denver
- 2023: Luis Flores, Oral Roberts
- 2024: Elie Kisoka, Kansas City
- 2025: Bryce Outman, Kansas City
- 2026: Mark Ramarola, Kansas City

=== Coach of the Year ===
- 1984: Brian Doyle, Cleveland State
- 1985: Cizo Mosnia, Eastern Illinois
- 1986: Brian Doyle, Cleveland State
- 1987: Cizo Mosnia, Eastern Illinois
- 1988: Cizo Mosnia, Eastern Illinois
- 1988: Tom Turner, Cleveland State
- 1989: Cizo Mosnia, Eastern Illinois
- 1990: Willy Roy, Northern Illinois
- 1991: Steve Parker, Akron
- 1992: Dave Poggi, Green Bay
- 1993: Brian Doyle, Cleveland State
- 1994: John Astudillo, Buffalo
- 1995: John MacKenzie, Western Illinois
- 1996: Mike Brown, UMKC
- 1997: Mis’ Mrak, Valparaiso
- 1998: Eric Johnson, Western Illinois
- 1998: Mis’ Mrak, Valparaiso
- 1999: Rick Benben, UMKC
- 2000: Eric Johnson, Western Illinois
- 2001: Rick Benben, UMKC
- 2002: Mis’ Mrak, Valparaiso
- 2003: Rick Benben, UMKC
- 2004: Steve Hayes, Oral Roberts
- 2005: Gary Parsons, Oakland
- 2006: Eric Johnson, Western Illinois
- 2007: Gary Parsons, Oakland
- 2008: Gary Parsons, Oakland
- 2009: Eric Pogue, Oakland
- 2010: Rick Benben, UMKC
- 2011: Eric Johnson, Western Illinois
- 2012: Eric Pogue, Oakland
- 2013: Bobby Muuss, Denver
- 2014: Jason Mims, Oakland
- 2015: Jamie Franks, Denver
- 2016: Jamie Franks, Denver
- 2017: Jamie Franks, Denver
- 2018: Jamie Franks, Denver
- 2019: Ryan Bush & Eric Johnson, Oral Roberts & Western Illinois
- 2020: Ryan Pore, Kansas City
- 2021: Ryan Bush, Oral Roberts
- 2022: Ryan Bush, Oral Roberts
- 2023: Jamie Franks, Denver
- 2024: Ryan Pore, Kansas City
- 2025: Ryan Pore, Kansas City
- 2026: Ryan Pore, Kansas City
