= 2019 Summit League men's soccer season =

- League: NCAA Division I
- Sport: Soccer
- Duration: August 30, 2019 – November 6, 2019
- Teams: 6

2020 MLS SuperDraft

Regular season
- Season MVP: Offensive: Defensive: Goalkeeper:

Tournament

Summit League men's soccer seasons
- ← 2018 2020 →

2019 Summit League men's soccer standings
	Conf.					Overall
Team	W		L		T	W		L		T
Western Illinois	4	–	1	–	0	5	–	13	–	1
Oral Roberts	4	–	1	–	0	13	–	4	–	0
Denver ‡	2	–	2	–	1	6	–	12	–	3
Omaha	2	–	2	–	1	4	–	9	–	4
Eastern Illinois	1	–	2	–	2	5	–	9	–	2
Purdue Fort Wayne	0	–	5	–	0	3	–	15	–	0
‡ – Summit Tournament Champion + – Invited to the 2019 NCAA tournament; As of 22 November 2019; Rankings from United Soccer Coaches

The 2019 Summit League men's soccer season will be the 14th season of men's varsity soccer in the conference. The season will begin in late August 2019 and conclude in mid-November 2019.

Denver enter the season as the defending regular season and tournament champions.

This is the final season for Purdue Fort Wayne as a Summit member. The Mastodons will leave for the Horizon League on July 1, 2020. The Summit will maintain its men's soccer membership at six with the return of the Kansas City Roos (formerly known as the UMKC Kangaroos), which will rejoin at the same date after seven seasons in the Western Athletic Conference.

== Head coaches ==
As of the 2018 season

Team	Head coach	Previous job	Years at school	Overall record	Record at school	Summit record	NCAA Tournaments	NCAA College Cups	NCAA Titles	Ref.
Eastern Illinois	Kiki Lara	Eastern Illinois (asst.)	4	12–32–11 (.318)	12–32–11 (.318)	5–8–3 (.406)	0	0	0	
Denver	Jamie Franks	Denver (asst.)	5	46–8–8 (.806)	46–8–8 (.806)	19–0–3 (.932)	4	1	0	
Omaha	Bob Warming	Penn State	2	468–248–83 (.638)	7–8–1 (.469)	4–1–0 (.800)	14	2	0	
Oral Roberts	Ryan Bush	Oral Roberts (asst.)	7	37–51–16 (.433)	37–51–16 (.433)	12–17–6 (.429)	0	0	0	
Purdue Fort Wayne	Mike Harper	IPFW (asst.)	13	62–129–19 (.340)	62–129–19 (.340)	19–46–6 (.310)	0	0	0	
Western Illinois	Eric Johnson	Loras	23	217–262–44 (.457)	174–209–40 (.459)	66–50–12 (.563)	6	0	0	

== Preseason ==
=== Preseason poll ===
The preseason poll was released on August 19, 2019.

	Team ranking	Points	First place votes
1.	Denver	24	4
2.	Omaha	21	2
3.	Purdue Fort Wayne	16	0
4.	Oral Roberts	13	0
5.	Western Illinois	9	0
6.	Eastern Illinois	7	0

=== Preseason national polls ===
The preseason national polls were released in July and August 2019. Denver was the only Summit League program ranked in preseason polls across all major polls.

United Soccer	CSN	Soccer America	Top Drawer Soccer	
Eastern Illinois	—	—	—	—
Denver	18	17	19	12
Omaha	RV	RV	—	—
Oral Roberts	RV	RV	—	—
Purdue Fort Wayne	—	—	—	—
Western Illinois	—	—	—	—

=== Preseason Players to Watch ===
Player	Nat.	School	Position	Class	Hometown (High school/Previous college/Previous club)
Jacob Stensson	SWE	Denver	MF	Junior	Stockholm, SWE (Brommapojkarna)
Preston Judd	USA	Denver	FW	Junior	Henderson, NV (Cal Baptist)
Edgar Mesa	ESP	Eastern Illinois	MF	Senior	San Miguel de Abona, ESP (BYU–Hawaii)

== Regular season ==
=== Early season tournaments ===
Early season tournaments will be announced in late Spring and Summer 2019.

Team	Tournament	Finish

=== Conference results ===
Color Key: Home • Away • Win • Loss • Draw • Postponed
Club	Match				
Club	1	2	3	4	5
Denver Pioneers (DEN)	EIU	WIU	ORU	OMA	PFW
Denver Pioneers (DEN)	0–0	3–4	0–1	2–0	3–1
Eastern Illinois Panthers (EIU)	DEN	ORU	UNO	WIU	PFW
Eastern Illinois Panthers (EIU)	0–0	0–2	0–0	1–2	1–0
Omaha Mavericks (UNO)	WIU	PFW	EIU	DEN	ORU
Omaha Mavericks (UNO)	3–1	1–0	0–0	0–2	0–3
Oral Roberts Golden Eagles (ORU)	PFW	EIU	DEN	OMA	WIU
Oral Roberts Golden Eagles (ORU)	6–0	2–0	1–0	3–0	1–2
Purdue Fort Wayne Mastodons (PFW)	ORU	OMA	WIU	EIU	DEN
Purdue Fort Wayne Mastodons (PFW)	0–6	0–1	0–2	0–1	1–3
Western Illinois Leathernecks (WIU)	OMA	DEN	PFW	EIU	ORU
Western Illinois Leathernecks (WIU)	1–3	4–3	2–0	2–1	2–1

=== Positions by round ===
Team ╲ Round	1	2	3	4	5
Oral Roberts	1	1	1	1	
Omaha	2	2	2	3	
Western Illinois	5	3	3	2	
Eastern Illinois	3	4	4	5	
Denver	4	5	5	4	
Purdue Fort Wayne	6	6	6	6	

2019 Summit League tournament

Source: TheSummitLeague.org

== Postseason ==
=== Summit League tournament ===
Semifinals; Nov. 14
1	Western Illinois	2
4	Omaha (OT)	3
2	Oral Roberts	0
3	Denver	1

Final; Nov. 16
4	Omaha	0
3	Denver	1

=== NCAA tournament ===
Seed	Region	School	1st round	2nd round	3rd round	Quarterfinals	Semifinals	Championship
—N/a	1	Denver	L, 0–1 at Missouri State	—	—	—	—	—

== Rankings ==
=== National rankings ===
	Improvement in ranking
	Drop in ranking
RV	Received votes but were not ranked in Top 25
NV	No votes received

		Pre	Wk 1	Wk 2	Wk 3	Wk 4	Wk 5	Wk 6	Wk 7	Wk 8	Wk 9	Wk 10	Wk 11	Wk 12	Wk 13	Wk 14	Wk 15	Wk 16	Final
Eastern Illinois	USC	NV	NV	NV	NV	NV	NV	NV	NV	NV	NV	NV			None released				
Eastern Illinois	TDS	NV	NV	NV	NV	NV	NV	NV	NV	NV	NV	NV	NV						
Denver	USC	18	RV	RV	NV	NV	NV	NV	NV	NV	NV	NV			None released				
Denver	TDS	12	12	14	NV	NV	NV	NV	NV	NV	NV	NV	NV						
Omaha	USC	NV	NV	NV	NV	NV	NV	NV	NV	NV	NV	NV			None released				
Omaha	TDS	NV	NV	NV	NV	NV	NV	NV	NV	NV	NV	NV	NV						
Oral Roberts	USC	NV	RV	RV	RV	RV	RV	RV	RV	RV	24	20			None released				
Oral Roberts	TDS	NV	NV	NV	NV	NV	NV	NV	NV	NV	NV	NV	NV						
Purdue Fort Wayne	USC	NV	NV	NV	NV	NV	NV	NV	NV	NV	NV	NV			None released				
Purdue Fort Wayne	TDS	NV	NV	NV	NV	NV	NV	NV	NV	NV	NV	NV	NV						
Western Illinois	USC	NV	NV	NV	NV	NV	NV	NV	NV	NV	NV	NV			None released				
Western Illinois	TDS	NV	NV	NV	NV	NV	NV	NV	NV	NV	NV	NV	NV						

=== Regional rankings - USC West Region ===
	Improvement in ranking
	Drop in ranking
RV	Received votes but were not ranked in Top 10
NV	No votes received

	Wk 1	Wk 2	Wk 3	Wk 4	Wk 5	Wk 6	Wk 7	Wk 8	Wk 9	Wk 10	Wk 11	Wk 12
Eastern Illinois	NV	NV	NV	NV	NV	NV	NV	NV	NV	NV		
Denver	2	NV	10	10	NV	NV	NV	NV	NV	NV		
Omaha	NV	NV	NV	NV	NV	NV	NV	NV	NV	NV		
Oral Roberts	6	6	5	4	4	4	4	5	3	3		
Purdue Fort Wayne	NV	NV	NV	NV	NV	NV	NV	NV	NV	NV		
Western Illinois	NV	NV	NV	NV	NV	NV	NV	NV	NV	NV		

== Awards and honors ==
=== Player of the Week ===
Week	Offensive Player of the Week			Defensive Player of the Week			Ref.
Week	Player	Position	Team	Player	Position	Team	Ref.
Sep. 3	Reed Berry	FW	Oral Roberts	Miles Motakef	GK	Oral Roberts	
Sep. 9	Dante Brigida	MF	Oral Roberts	Miles Motakef	GK	Oral Roberts	
Sep. 16	Blake Cearns	FW	Purdue Fort Wayne	Will Palmquist	GK	Denver	
Sep. 23	Dante Brigida	FW	Oral Roberts	Tor Erik Larsen	GK	Purdue Fort Wayne	
Sep. 30	Juan Arias	MF	Oral Roberts	Miles Motakef	GK	Oral Roberts	
Oct. 7	Tanguy Gueerineau	FW	Oral Roberts	Gustavo Vargas	DF	Oral Roberts	
Oct. 14	Paul Kirdorf	MF	Western Illinois	Gonzalo Ledesma	DF	Omaha	
Oct. 21	Ryan DeBois	FW	Western Illinois	Tim Trilk	GK	Western Illinois	
Oct. 28							
Nov. 4							

=== Postseason honors ===
2019 Summit League Men's Soccer Individual Awards
Award	Recipient(s)
Offensive Player of the Year	
Defensive Player of the Year	
Goalkeeper of the Year	
Coach of the Year	
Newcomer of the Year	

2019 Summit League Men's Soccer All-Conference Teams
First Team	Second Team	Newcomer Team

== 2020 MLS Draft ==
The 2020 MLS SuperDraft was held on January 9, 2020. No players from the Summit League were selected in the draft.

== Homegrown players ==
The Homegrown Player Rule is a Major League Soccer program that allows MLS teams to sign local players from their own development academies directly to MLS first team rosters. Before the creation of the rule in 2008, every player entering Major League Soccer had to be assigned through one of the existing MLS player allocation processes, such as the MLS SuperDraft.

To place a player on its homegrown player list, making him eligible to sign as a homegrown player, players must have resided in that club's home territory and participated in the club's youth development system for at least one year. Players can play college soccer and still be eligible to sign a homegrown contract.

Original MLS team	Player	Pos.	School	Ref.
