= 2026 Kansas City Roos men's soccer team =

American college soccer season

2026 Kansas City Roos men's soccer

Summit League regular season champions
- Conference: Summit League
- U. Soc. Coaches poll: No. 12
- TopDrawerSoccer.com: No. 13
- Record: 11–3–2 (4–1–0 Summit)
- Head coach: Ryan Pore (7th season)
- Assistant coaches: Rafael Martinez; Nick McDonald; Filippo Errico
- Home stadium: Durwood Soccer Stadium

2026 Summit League men's soccer standings
	Conf.					Overall
Team	W		L		T	W		L		T
No. 12 Kansas City †	4	–	1	–	0	11	–	3	–	2
Omaha	3	–	1	–	1	9	–	4	–	3
UMass	2	–	2	–	1	6	–	7	–	3
Oral Roberts	1	–	2	–	2	3	–	7	–	5
St. Thomas	1	–	3	–	1	5	–	8	–	3
Delaware	0	–	2	–	3	7	–	4	–	6
† – Conference champion ‡ – 2026 Summit League tournament champion + – At-large invitation to the 2026 NCAA tournament; As of October 31, 2026; Rankings from United Soccer Coaches; Source: Summit

The 2026 Kansas City Roos men's soccer team represents the University of Missouri–Kansas City during the 2026 NCAA Division I men's soccer season. The Roos are led by head coach Ryan Pore, in his seventh season, and play their home games at Durwood Soccer Stadium in Kansas City, Missouri. They compete in the Summit League.

The Roos were picked to win the Summit League in the preseason coaches' poll and began the season ranked 25th in the United Soccer Coaches poll. After a 5–0 win over SIUE in their opener and a first loss to San Francisco, they drew 1–1 at third-ranked SMU on a 90th-minute equalizer from Mark Ramarola. They then beat tenth-ranked Michigan State 3–1 and San Diego 1–0, and by early October had risen to fourth in the United Soccer Coaches poll, the highest national ranking for any UMKC program. TopDrawerSoccer ranked them third, the highest ranking in program history. A 3–0 loss at NC State dropped them to eleventh. The Roos won their first four Summit League matches, clinching their second consecutive regular-season title with a 3–2 Senior Day win over UMass behind two goals from Mariano Beunza. They closed the regular season with a 4–0 loss at Omaha, the highest-ranked win in Omaha's program history.

The Roos finished the regular season 11–3–2 and 4–1–0 in Summit League play. As the first seed in the Summit League Tournament, they received a bye to the Semifinals and will host the Semifinals on November 11 and the Final on November 14 at Durwood Soccer Stadium. Pore was named Summit League Coach of the Year for the third consecutive season, Ramarola was named Midfielder of the Year and Newcomer of the Year, and Bryson Gosch was named Defensive Player of the Year. Beunza leads the team with seven goals.

== Background ==
The Roos finished the 2025 season 12–4–5 and 4–1–1 in Summit League play, winning their first Summit League regular-season title since 2010. They received an at-large bid to the NCAA Tournament, where they hosted the program's first NCAA Tournament match and defeated Lindenwood 1–0 in the First Round. They lost 1–0 at Stanford in the Second Round, after earlier losing the Summit League Tournament final 4–2 at Denver.

== Player movement ==
=== Players leaving ===
Departures
Name	Number	Pos.	Height	Year	Hometown	Reason for Departure
Joackim Betina	2	DF	5'10"	Graduate Student	Péronne, France	Graduated
Elie Kisoka	9	FW	6'1"	Senior	Marseille, France	Graduated
Cameron Ayoade	13	FW	5'10"	Freshman	Olathe, Kansas	—
Mateus Moura	14	DF	5'10"	Senior	São Paulo, Brazil	Graduated
Kenny Yedmel	15	DF	6'2"	Freshman	Bordeaux, France	—
Edin Clark	19	FW	6'1"	Freshman	St. Louis, Missouri	—
Timothy Ospina	21	MF	6'0"	Senior	Dallas, Texas	Graduated
Emmanuele Garofalo	23	MF	6'0"	Sophomore	Palermo, Italy	—
Lennart Fischer	25	GK	6'5"	Junior	Paderborn, Germany	—
Wade Muttitt	27	FW	5'7"	Graduate Student	Crowthorne, England	Graduated

=== Players arriving ===
==== Incoming transfers ====
Incoming transfers
Name	Number	Pos.	Height	Year	Hometown	Previous School
Gabriel Santuari	23	MF	5'11"	Graduate Student	Trento, Italy	Clemson
Brice Miller Jr.	29	FW	5'8"	Sophomore	Frisco, Texas	Seattle U

==== Recruiting class ====
Name	Nat.	Hometown	Club / High school
Makhi Francis; MF	USA	Evanston, Illinois	Sporting KC Academy
Rihito Kaji; DF	JPN	Minoh, Japan	Gamba Osaka Academy
Elouan Labadie-Vincent; MF	FRA	Vire, France	US Avranches
Brendan Mikuliza; GK	USA	Orlando, Florida	Sporting KC II
Pablo Morato; FW	FRA	Toulouse, France	US Colomiers
Alessandro Patelli; MF	ITA	Grumello del Monte, Italy	AlbinoLeffe
Mark Ramarola; DF	FRA	Lyon, France	Olympique Lyonnais
Jonas Rossdorfer; DF	AUT	Linz, Austria	ASKÖ Oedt
Juan Pablo Salgado Canepa; DF	ARG	Buenos Aires, Argentina	—
Carter Santa; DF	USA	Prairie Village, Kansas	Kansas City Athletics

== Squad ==
=== Roster ===
As of November 6, 2026

Note: Flags indicate national team as defined under FIFA eligibility rules; some limited exceptions apply. Players may hold more than one non-FIFA nationality.

No.	Pos.	Nation	Player
0	GK	USA	Brandon Kincaid
1	GK	POL	Marc Popow
2	DF	FRA	Mark Ramarola
3	DF	USA	Brevyn Cole
4	DF	ESP	Guille Munoz
5	DF	USA	Bryson Gosch
6	MF	ESP	Miguel Fernandez
7	MF	USA	Bryce Outman
8	MF	FRA	Mathias Baucher
9	FW	FRA	Jeremy Francou
10	MF	ITA	Gabriele Galluccio
11	FW	ESP	Mariano Beunza
12	DF	CZE	Ales Kohoutek
13	DF	AUT	Jonas Rossdorfer
14	MF	FRA	Elouan Labadie-Vincent
15	DF	USA	Carter Santa

No.	Pos.	Nation	Player
16	MF	USA	Makhi Francis
17	MF	JPN	Shotaro Kodama
18	FW	USA	Ethan Schaefer
19	FW	FRA	Pablo Morato
20	MF	BRA	Raphael Kistmann
21	FW	USA	Ian Witis-Hughes
22	DF	USA	Wesley Cribb
23	MF	ITA	Gabriel Santuari
24	GK	USA	Adam Lansdown
28	FW	USA	Brice Middleton
29	FW	USA	Brice Miller Jr.
30	GK	USA	Brendan Mikuliza
31	MF	ITA	Alessandro Patelli
32	MF	FRA	Kevin Nkumu
33	DF	JPN	Rihito Kaji
34	DF	ARG	Juan Pablo Salgado Canepa

=== Team management ===
Position	Staff
Head coach	Ryan Pore
Associate head coach	Rafael Martinez
Assistant coach	Nick McDonald
Goalkeeping coach	Filippo Errico

== Schedule ==
Date Time, TV	Rank^{#}	Opponent^{#}	Result	Record	Site (Attendance) City, State
Regular season
August 20*; 7:30 p.m.	No. 25	SIUE	W 5–0	1–0–0	Durwood Stadium (752); Kansas City, MO
August 25*; 7:30 p.m.	No. 15	UNLV	W 1–0	2–0–0	Durwood Stadium (588); Kansas City, MO
August 30*; 7:30 p.m.	No. 15	San Francisco	L 2–3	2–1–0	Durwood Stadium (374); Kansas City, MO
September 4*; 7:00 p.m.		at No. 3 SMU	T 1–1	2–1–1	Washburne Stadium (1,087); Dallas, TX
September 7*; 7:00 p.m.		at Drake	W 1–0	3–1–1	Mediacom Stadium (604); Des Moines, IA
September 11*; 7:00 p.m.		No. 10 Michigan State	W 3–1	4–1–1	Durwood Stadium (675); Kansas City, MO
September 16*; 6:00 p.m.	No. 16	at No. 12 Missouri State	T 3–3	4–1–2	Allison South Stadium (554); Springfield, MO
September 20*; 7:00 p.m.	No. 16	No. 10 San Diego	W 1–0	5–1–2	Durwood Stadium (490); Kansas City, MO
September 26; 7:00 p.m.	No. 8	Oral Roberts	W 3–1	6–1–2 (1–0–0)	Durwood Stadium (664); Kansas City, MO
October 3; 1:00 p.m.	No. 5	at St. Thomas	W 1–0	7–1–2 (2–0–0)	South Field (145); St. Paul, MN
October 7*; 6:00 p.m.	No. 4	Tulsa	W 3–1	8–1–2	Durwood Stadium (488); Kansas City, MO
October 11*; 5:00 p.m.	No. 4	at NC State	L 0–3	8–2–2	Dail Soccer Field (1,038); Raleigh, NC
October 17; 6:00 p.m.	No. 11	at Delaware	W 2–0	9–2–2 (3–0–0)	Grant Stadium (419); Newark, DE
October 20*; 5:00 p.m.	No. 5	at Penn	W 2–1	10–2–2	Rhodes Field (160); Philadelphia, PA
October 25; 12:00 p.m.	No. 5	UMass	W 3–2	11–2–2 (4–0–0)	Durwood Stadium (615); Kansas City, MO
October 31; 5:00 p.m.	No. 5	at Omaha	L 0–4	11–3–2 (4–1–0)	Caniglia Field (515); Omaha, NE
Summit League Tournament
November 11*; 6:00 p.m.	(1) No. 12	TBD; Semifinals			Durwood Stadium; Kansas City, MO
*Non-conference game. ^{#}Rankings from United Soccer Coaches. (#) Tournament seedings in parentheses. All times are in Central.

== Goals record ==
Through October 31, 2026.

Rank	No.	Nat.	Po.	Name	Regular season	Summit League Tournament	NCAA Tournament	Total
1	11	(Spain)	FW	Mariano Beunza	7	0	0	7
2	2	(France)	DF	Mark Ramarola	6	0	0	6
2	20	(Brazil)	MF	Raphael Kistmann	6	0	0	6
4	10	(Italy)	MF	Gabriele Galluccio	2	0	0	2
4	14	(France)	MF	Elouan Labadie-Vincent	2	0	0	2
4	21	(United States)	FW	Ian Witis-Hughes	2	0	0	2
7	3	(United States)	DF	Brevyn Cole	1	0	0	1
7	4	(Spain)	DF	Guille Munoz	1	0	0	1
7	7	(United States)	MF	Bryce Outman	1	0	0	1
7	8	(France)	MF	Mathias Baucher	1	0	0	1
7	9	(France)	FW	Jeremy Francou	1	0	0	1
7	17	(Japan)	MF	Shotaro Kodama	1	0	0	1
Total					31	0	0	31

== Disciplinary record ==
Through October 31, 2026. Does not include four cautions issued to the Kansas City bench.

Rank	No.	Nat.	Po.	Name	Regular Season			Summit League Tournament			NCAA Tournament			Total		
Rank	No.	Nat.	Po.	Name	Yellow card	(yellow card) (yellow-red card)	Red card	Yellow card	(yellow card) (yellow-red card)	Red card	Yellow card	(yellow card) (yellow-red card)	Red card	Yellow card	(yellow card) (yellow-red card)	Red card
1	4	(Spain)	DF	Guille Munoz	3	0	0	0	0	0	0	0	0	3	0	0
1	5	(United States)	DF	Bryson Gosch	3	0	0	0	0	0	0	0	0	3	0	0
1	7	(United States)	MF	Bryce Outman	3	0	0	0	0	0	0	0	0	3	0	0
1	12	(Czech Republic)	DF	Ales Kohoutek	3	0	0	0	0	0	0	0	0	3	0	0
5	10	(Italy)	MF	Gabriele Galluccio	2	0	0	0	0	0	0	0	0	2	0	0
6	2	(France)	DF	Mark Ramarola	1	0	0	0	0	0	0	0	0	1	0	0
6	3	(United States)	DF	Brevyn Cole	1	0	0	0	0	0	0	0	0	1	0	0
6	6	(Spain)	MF	Miguel Fernandez	1	0	0	0	0	0	0	0	0	1	0	0
6	8	(France)	MF	Mathias Baucher	1	0	0	0	0	0	0	0	0	1	0	0
6	11	(Spain)	FW	Mariano Beunza	1	0	0	0	0	0	0	0	0	1	0	0
6	19	(France)	FW	Pablo Morato	1	0	0	0	0	0	0	0	0	1	0	0
6	20	(Brazil)	MF	Raphael Kistmann	1	0	0	0	0	0	0	0	0	1	0	0
6	21	(United States)	FW	Ian Witis-Hughes	1	0	0	0	0	0	0	0	0	1	0	0
6	23	(Italy)	MF	Gabriel Santuari	1	0	0	0	0	0	0	0	0	1	0	0
6	31	(Italy)	MF	Alessandro Patelli	1	0	0	0	0	0	0	0	0	1	0	0
6	34	(Argentina)	DF	Juan Pablo Salgado Canepa	1	0	0	0	0	0	0	0	0	1	0	0
Total					25	0	0	0	0	0	0	0	0	25	0	0

== Awards and honors ==
Recipient	Award	Date	Ref.
Ryan Pore	Summit League Coach of the Year	November 5	
Mark Ramarola	Summit League Midfielder of the Year	November 5	
Mark Ramarola	Summit League Newcomer of the Year	November 5	
Mark Ramarola	First Team All-Summit League	November 5	
Mark Ramarola	Summit League All-Newcomer Team	November 5	
Bryson Gosch	Summit League Defensive Player of the Year	November 5	
Bryson Gosch	First Team All-Summit League	November 5	
Mariano Beunza	First Team All-Summit League	November 5	
Raphael Kistmann	First Team All-Summit League	November 5	
Brevyn Cole	Second Team All-Summit League	November 5	
Miguel Fernandez	Second Team All-Summit League	November 5	
Brandon Kincaid	Second Team All-Summit League	November 5	

== Rankings ==
Ranking movements Legend: ██ Increase in ranking ██ Decrease in ranking — = Not ranked RV = Received votes
	Week																
Poll	Pre	1	2	3	4	5	6	7	8	9	10	11	12	13	14	15	Final
United Soccer	25	15	—	RV	16	8	5	4	11	5	5	12		Not released			
TopDrawer Soccer	23	23	19	23	19	14	4	3	3	7	6	6	13				
College Soccer News	RV	24	RV	RV	22	13	7	4	7	10	7	8			Not released		
