= 2017 Summit League men's soccer tournament =

- Classification: Division I
- Teams: 4
- Matches: 3
- Attendance: 1,483
- Site: Al F. Caniglia Field; Omaha, Nebraska
- Champions: Omaha (1st title)
- Winning coach: Jason Mims (1st title)

2017 Summit League men's soccer standings
	Conf.					Overall
Team	W		L		T	W		L		T
Denver	5	–	0	–	0	11	–	6	–	2
Western Illinois	3	–	2	–	0	5	–	10	–	0
Omaha ‡	2	–	1	–	2	10	–	6	–	3
Eastern Illinois	2	–	2	–	1	4	–	9	–	6
Oral Roberts	1	–	4	–	0	4	–	11	–	1
Fort Wayne	0	–	4	–	1	5	–	9	–	4
‡-Tournament Champion +-Invited to the 2017 NCAA Division I Men's Soccer Championship; As of November 17, 2017; Rankings from United Soccer Coaches

The 2017 Summit League men's soccer tournament, was the 24th edition of the tournament. It determined the Summit League's automatic berth into the 2017 NCAA Division I Men's Soccer Championship.

The tournament was hosted by the University of Nebraska Omaha and all matches were contested at Al F. Caniglia Field. Tournament hosts Omaha reached the final against Denver, creating a repeat of the 2016 Summit League Men's Soccer Tournament championship game.

For only the second time in tournament history, and for the first time since 2008, the championship was determined through a penalty shoot-out. The longest shoot-out in Summit League history, the marathon of penalty kicks went for 12 rounds, with two players on each side kicking twice from the penalty mark. Omaha were able to get the better of Denver, winning the shoot-out 9-8 thanks to a miss from Denver's Graham Smith and a successfully converted penalty from Emmanuel Hamzat.

Omaha earned their first ever college conference tournament championship, and their first ever berth into the NCAA Division I men's soccer tournament. In the NCAA Tourney, Omaha played at No. 13, Florida International, and lost in the first round, 2-0.

== Seeds ==
The top four teams participate in the tournament. The seeding is based on the program's conference record during the 2017 Summit League season.

Seed	School	Conference	Tiebreaker
1	Denver	5–0	
2	Western Illinois	3–2	
3	Omaha	2–1–2	
4	Eastern Illinois	2–2–1	

== Bracket ==
Semifinals
1	Denver	1
4	Eastern Illinois	0
2	Western Illinois	0
3	Omaha	2

Championship
1	Denver	1 (8)
3	Omaha (pen.)	1 (9)

== Results ==
=== Semifinals ===
November 9
2:00 PM CST

^{No. 1} Denver Pioneers	1–0	^{No. 4} Eastern Illinois Panthers
Elder 39'	Report	Corti (yellow card) 21'

Caniglia Field, Omaha, Nebraska
Attendance: 217
Referee: Juan Chamizo

November 9
5:00 PM CST

^{No. 3} Omaha Mavericks	2–0	^{No. 2} Western Illinois Leathernecks
Frimpong 13', 61'; Rinderknecht (yellow card) 43'	Report	Kirdorf (yellow card) 3'; Kouassi (yellow card) 58'; Keti (yellow card) 79'

Caniglia Field, Omaha, Nebraska
Attendance: 563
Referee: Brent Wilson

=== Championship ===
November 11
2:00 PM CST

^{No. 3} Omaha Mavericks	1–1 (a.e.t.)	^{No. 1} Denver Pioneers
X. Gomez 28' (pen.)	Report	Devoss 26'
Penalties
Hamzat (penalty scored); X. Gomez (penalty scored); Weiler (penalty scored); Ghitis (penalty scored); Ibišević (penalty missed); Gutierrez (penalty scored); Nelson (penalty scored); Woods (penalty missed); M. Gomez (penalty scored); Bowman (penalty scored); Hamzat (penalty scored)	8–9	(penalty scored) Underwood; (penalty scored) Smalley; (penalty scored) Smith; (penalty scored) Stensson; (penalty missed) Shinyashiki; (penalty scored) Fuller; (penalty scored) Morlack; (penalty missed) Akamatsu; (penalty scored) Elder; (penalty scored) Barlow; (penalty missed) Smith

Caniglia Field, Omaha, Nebraska
Attendance: 703
Referee: Nikola Aleksic

== Statistics ==
=== Goals ===
Rank	Player	College	Goals
1	(United States) Fred Frimpong	Omaha	2
2	(United States) Blake Elder	Denver	1
2	(United States) Scott DeVoss	Denver	1
2	(United States) Xavier Gomez	Omaha	1

=== Assists ===
Rank	Player	College	Assists
1	(United States) Diego Gutierrez	Omaha	1
1	(Nigeria) Emmanuel Hamzat	Omaha	1
1	(Sweden) Jacob Stensson	Denver	1

=== Shutouts ===
Rank	Player	College	Shutouts
1	(United States) Joseph Ghitis	Omaha	1
1	(United States) Nick Gardner	Denver	1

== See also ==
- Summit League Men's Soccer Tournament
- 2017 Summit League Women's Soccer Tournament
