= 2019 Summit League men's soccer tournament =

- Classification: Division I
- Teams: 4
- Matches: 3
- Site: CIBER Field; Denver, Colorado
- Champions: Denver (6th title)
- Winning coach: Jamie Franks (3rd title)
- MVP: Preston Judd (Denver)
- Broadcast: ESPN+

2019 Summit League men's soccer standings
	Conf.					Overall
Team	W		L		T	W		L		T
Western Illinois	4	–	1	–	0	5	–	13	–	1
Oral Roberts	4	–	1	–	0	13	–	4	–	0
Denver ‡	2	–	2	–	1	6	–	12	–	3
Omaha	2	–	2	–	1	4	–	9	–	4
Eastern Illinois	1	–	2	–	2	5	–	9	–	2
Purdue Fort Wayne	0	–	5	–	0	3	–	15	–	0
‡ – Summit Tournament Champion + – Invited to the 2019 NCAA tournament; As of 22 November 2019; Rankings from United Soccer Coaches

The 2019 Summit League men's soccer tournament, was the 26th edition of the tournament. It determined the Summit League's automatic berth into the 2019 NCAA Division I men's soccer tournament.

The defending champions, Denver, won the title, beating Omaha 1-0 in the final.

== Seeds ==
Seed	School	Conference	Tiebreaker
1	Western Illinois	4–1–0	1–0 vs. ORU
2	Oral Roberts	4–1–0	0–1 vs. WIU
3	Denver	2–2–1	1–0 vs. UNO
4	Omaha	2–2–1	0–1 vs. DEN

== Bracket ==
Semifinals; Nov. 14
1	Western Illinois	2
4	Omaha (OT)	3
2	Oral Roberts	0
3	Denver	1

Final; Nov. 16
4	Omaha	0
3	Denver	1

== Results ==
=== Semifinals ===
November 14
1:05 p.m. MST

No. 1 Western Illinois	2–3 (a.e.t.)	No. 4 Omaha
Otsuka 55', 74'	Report	Hammer 29'; Bautista 79'; Mateu 94'

CIBER Field, Denver
Attendance: 201
Referee: Cesar Ibarra

November 14
4:05 p.m. MST

No. 2 Oral Roberts	0–2	No. 3 Denver
	Report	Drack 25'; Stensson 90'

CIBER Field, Denver
Attendance: 201
Referee: Calin Radosav

=== Final ===
November 16
2:05 p.m. MST

No. 3 Denver	1–0	No. 4 Omaha
Judd 29'	Report

CIBER Field, Denver
Attendance: 411
Referee: Art Arustamyan

== All Tournament Team ==
**2019 Summit League Men's Soccer All-Tournament team**

Marcos Bautista, Omaha
Tanguy Geurineau, Oral Roberts
**Preston Judd, Denver**
Pep Mateu, Omaha
Daisuke Otsuka, Western Illinois
Will Palmquist, Denver
Seth Rinderknecht, Omaha
Jacob Stensson, Denver
Callum Stretch, Denver
Tim Trilk, Western Illinois
Gustavo Vargas, Oral Roberts

MVP in Bold
