= 2018 Summit League men's soccer tournament =

- Classification: Division I
- Teams: 4
- Matches: 3
- Attendance: 751
- Site: CIBER Field; Denver, Colorado
- Champions: Denver (5th title)
- Winning coach: Jamie Franks (3rd title)
- MVP: Scott DeVoss (Denver)

2018 Summit League men's soccer standings
	Conf.					Overall
Team	W		L		T	W		L		T
No. 19 Denver ‡	4	–	0	–	1	15	–	4	–	2
Omaha	4	–	1	–	0	7	–	8	–	1
Purdue Fort Wayne	2	–	3	–	0	10	–	8	–	1
Eastern Illinois	1	–	2	–	2	3	–	11	–	4
Western Illinois	1	–	3	–	1	4	–	10	–	3
Oral Roberts	0	–	3	–	2	6	–	7	–	3
‡-Tournament Champion +-Invited to the 2018 NCAA Division I Men's Soccer Championship; As of December 11, 2018; Rankings from United Soccer Coaches

The 2018 Summit League men's soccer tournament, was the 25th edition of the tournament. It determined the Summit League's automatic berth into the 2018 NCAA Division I Men's Soccer Championship.

Denver won the Summit League title, making it their fifth title in the last six years. They defeated the defending Summit League champions, Omaha, 1–0.

== Seeds ==
Seed	School	Conference	Tiebreaker
1	Denver	4–0–1	
2	Omaha	4–1–0	
3	Purdue Fort Wayne	2–3–0	
4	Eastern Illinois	1–2–2	

== Bracket ==
Semifinals; Nov. 8
1	Denver	1
4	Eastern Illinois	0
2	Omaha	1
3	Purdue Fort Wayne	0

Final; Nov. 10
1	Denver	1
2	Omaha	0

== Results ==
=== Semifinals ===
November 8
1:05 p.m. MST

No. 1 Denver	1–0	No. 4 Eastern Illinois
Shinyashiki 12'	Report

CIBER Field, Denver, Colorado
Attendance: 175
Referee: Shane Butler

November 8
4:05 p.m. MST

No. 2 Omaha	1–0	No. 3 Purdue Fort Wayne
Hamadi 70'	Report

CIBER Field, Denver, Colorado
Attendance: 175
Referee: Heber Estrada

=== Final ===
November 10
3:00 p.m. MST

No. 1 Denver	1–0	No. 2 Omaha
Akamatsu 15'	Report

CIBER Field, Denver, Colorado
Attendance: 401
Referee: Mark Kadlecik

== Statistics ==
=== Goals ===
Rank	Player	College	Goals
1	(Japan) Kenny Akamatsu	Denver	1
1	(Kenya) Noor Hamadi	Omaha	1
1	(Brazil) Andre Shinyashiki	Denver	1

=== Assists ===
Rank	Player	College	Assists
1	(France) Hugo Ellouk	Omaha	1
1	(United States) Diego Gutierrez	Omaha	1
1	(Israel) Moshe Perez	Denver	1
1	(Sweden) Jacob Stensson	Denver	1

== All Tournament Team ==
**2018 Summit League Men's Soccer All-Tournament team**

Andy O'Donoghue, Purdue Fort Wayne
Matthew Lieshout, Purdue Fort Wayne
Kris Luke, Eastern Illinois
Cole Harkrader, Eastern Illinois
Marcos Bautista, Omaha
Nil Ayats, Omaha
Billy Hoffman, Omaha
Moshe Perez, Denver
Kenny Akamatsu, Denver
Jacob Stensson, Denver
**Scott DeVoss, Denver**

MVP in Bold
