= 2021 Summit League men's soccer tournament =

- Classification: Division I
- Teams: 4
- Matches: 3
- Attendance: 295
- Site: MacKenzie Alumni Field; Macomb, Illinois
- Champions: Denver (7th title)
- Winning coach: Jamie Franks (4th title)
- MVP: Kobe Gray (Denver)
- Broadcast: ESPN+

2021 Summit League men's soccer standings
	Conf.					Overall
Team	W		L		T	W		L		T
Oral Roberts	4	–	1	–	1	11	–	2	–	2
Denver ‡	4	–	1	–	1	10	–	4	–	5
Omaha	4	–	2	–	0	6	–	10	–	1
Kansas City	2	–	2	–	2	3	–	7	–	5
Western Illinois	2	–	4	–	0	2	–	13	–	1
St. Thomas ^{#}	2	–	4	–	0	3	–	11	–	2
Eastern Illinois	1	–	5	–	0	2	–	12	–	1
‡ – 2021 Summit Tournament Champion + – At-large invitation to the 2021 NCAA tournament ^{#} – Ineligible for post-season (In transition); As of December 14, 2021; Rankings from United Soccer Coaches; Source: Summit

The 2021 Summit League men's soccer tournament was the postseason men's soccer tournament for the Summit League held on November 11 and 13, 2021. The three-match tournament took place at MacKenzie Alumni Field in Macomb, Illinois. The four-team single-elimination tournament consisted of two rounds based on seeding from regular season conference play. The Denver Pioneers were the defending champions after no tournament was held in 2020. Denver were champions in 2019. Denver successfully defended their title, defeating Oral Roberts in the final in a penalty shoot-out. The tournament win was Denver's seventh as a member of the conference, and the title was the fourth for head coach Jamie Franks. Denver has now won seven of the past eight Summit League tournaments. As tournament champions, Denver earned the Summit League's automatic berth into the 2021 NCAA Division I men's soccer tournament.

== Seeding ==
Four of the seven Summit League men's soccer programs qualified for the 2021 Tournament. Teams were seeded based on their regular season records. Tiebreakers were used to determine the seedings of teams who finished with identical conference records. The first tiebreaker was required to determine the first and second seed as Denver and Oral Roberts finished with identical 4–1–1 regular season records. Denver was awarded the first seed based on their 1–0 victory over Oral Roberts on October 30. A second tiebreaker was required to determine the third and fourth seeds as Omaha and Kansas City both finished with identical 4–2–0 regular season records. Omaha earned the third seed based on their 2–0 victory over Kansas City on October 2.

Seed	School	Conference Record	Points
1	Denver	4–1–1	13
2	Oral Roberts	4–1–1	13
3	Omaha	4–2–0	12
4	Kansas City	4–2–0	12

== Bracket ==
Semifinals; Thursday, November 11
1	Denver (pen.)	0 (4)
4	Kansas City	0 (3)
2	Oral Roberts	2
3	Omaha	1

Final; Saturday, November 13
1	Denver (pen.)	1 (3)
2	Oral Roberts	1 (2)

== Schedule ==
=== Semifinals ===
November 11, 2021	#1 Denver	0–0 (a.e.t.) (4–3 p)	#4 Kansas City	Macomb, IL
11:00 a.m. CT	Eli Mereness (yellow card) 18'	Report	(yellow card) 27' Hugo Von Reis; (yellow card) 60' Carson Lindsey	Stadium: MacKenzie Alumni Field; Attendance: 30
	Penalties
	Eli Mereness (penalty scored); Kengo Ohira (penalty missed); Sam Bassett (penalty scored); Aidan O'Toole (penalty scored); Lucas Russo (penalty scored)		(penalty scored) Cooper Clark; (penalty scored) Joan Castells; (penalty missed) Kotaro Hirokawa; (penalty scored) Seth Kacich; (penalty missed) Edson Murguia

November 11, 2021	#2 Oral Roberts	2–1	#3 Omaha	Macomb, IL
2:15 p.m. CT	Juan Arias 38', 75'	Report	54' Kenji Mboma Dem; (yellow card) 74' Ed Port	Stadium: MacKenzie Alumni Field; Attendance: 55

=== Final ===
November 13, 2021	#1 Denver	1–1 (a.e.t.) (3–2 p)	#2 Oral Roberts	Macomb, IL
1:00 p.m. CT	Trevor Wright 3'; Stefan DeLeone (yellow card) 23'; Ben Smith (yellow card) 48'	Report	21' (pen.), (yellow card) 52' Dante Brigida; (yellow card) 44' Francisco Lopes	Stadium: MacKenzie Alumni Field; Attendance: 213
	Penalties
	Sam Bassett (penalty missed); Eli Mereness (penalty missed); Griffin Meyer (penalty scored); Aidan O'Toole (penalty missed); Lucas Russo (penalty scored); Destan Norman (penalty scored)		(penalty missed) Dante Brigida; (penalty scored) Felipe Medina; (penalty missed) Joe Ruiz; (penalty scored) Juan Arias; (penalty missed) Miles Motakef; (penalty missed) Vinicius Oliveira

== Statistics ==
=== Goalscorers ===
There were 5 goals scored in 3 matches, for an average of 1.67 goals per match.

2 goals

- Juan Arias – Oral Roberts

1 goal

- Trevor Wright – Denver
- Kenji Mboma Dem – Omaha
- Dante Brigida – Oral Roberts

== All-Tournament team ==
Player	Team
**Kobe Gray**	Denver
Destan Norman	Denver
Trevor Wright	Denver
Liam Johnson	Denver
Dante Brigida	Oral Roberts
Juan Arias	Oral Roberts
Joe Ruiz	Oral Roberts
Cooper Clark	Kansas City
Mario Sandoval	Kansas City
Kenji Mboma Dem	Omaha
Ed Gordon	Omaha

MVP in bold
