= 2019 Denver Pioneers men's soccer team =

US college soccer team

2019 Denver Pioneers men's soccer

Summit League tournament champions

NCAA Tournament, First Round
- Conference: Summit League
- Record: 6–12–3 (2–2–1 Summit)
- Head coach: Jamie Franks (5th season)
- Assistant coaches: Masaki Hemmi (2nd season); Owen Griffith (1st season)
- Home stadium: DU Soccer Stadium

2019 Summit League men's soccer standings
	Conf.					Overall
Team	W		L		T	W		L		T
Western Illinois	4	–	1	–	0	5	–	13	–	1
Oral Roberts	4	–	1	–	0	13	–	4	–	0
Denver ‡	2	–	2	–	1	6	–	12	–	3
Omaha	2	–	2	–	1	4	–	9	–	4
Eastern Illinois	1	–	2	–	2	5	–	9	–	2
Purdue Fort Wayne	0	–	5	–	0	3	–	15	–	0
‡ – Summit Tournament Champion + – Invited to the 2019 NCAA tournament; As of 22 November 2019; Rankings from United Soccer Coaches

The 2019 Denver Pioneers men's soccer team represented University of Denver during the 2019 NCAA Division I men's soccer season and the 2019 Summit League men's soccer season. The regular season began on August 30 and concluded on November 9. It was the program's 59th season fielding a men's varsity soccer team, and their 7th season in the Summit League. The 2019 season was Jamie Franks's fifth year as head coach for the program.

== Roster ==
As of December 24, 2019

Note: Flags indicate national team as defined under FIFA eligibility rules; some limited exceptions apply. Players may hold more than one non-FIFA nationality.

No.	Pos.	Nation	Player
00	GK	(United States) USA	Kobe Gray
0	GK	(United States) USA	Cyrus Margono
1	GK	(United States) USA	Will Palmquist
2	DF	(Brazil) BRA	Lucas Russo
4	DF	(United States) USA	Bailey Heller
5	MF	(United States) USA	Aidan O'Toole
6	DF	(United States) USA	Callum Stretch
7	MF	(United States) USA	Stefan DeLeone
8	MF	(United States) USA	Destan Norman
9	FW	(United States) USA	Preston Judd
10	MF	(Sweden) SWE	Jacob Stensson
11	FW	(England) ENG	Danny Barlow

No.	Pos.	Nation	Player
15	MF	(United States) USA	Alex Kaddah
16	DF	(United States) USA	Sam Hallam
19	FW	(United States) USA	Josh Drack
21	MF	(United States) USA	Ethan Ash
22	MF	(United States) USA	Liam Johnson
23	MF	(United States) USA	Eli Mereness
24	FW	(United States) USA	Brooks Crawford
25	DF	(United States) USA	Dylan Keeney
30	GK	(United States) USA	Greg L'Hommedieu
33	MF	(United States) USA	Connor McWilliams
91	MF	(Japan) JPN	Kengo Ohira

== Schedule ==
Date Time, TV	Rank^{#}	Opponent^{#}	Result	Record	Site (Attendance) City, State
Non-conference regular season
August 30*; 8:30 p.m.	No. 18	at Washington	L 1–2	0–1–0	Husky Soccer Stadium (1,107); Seattle, WA
September 2*; 7:00 p.m.	No. 18	at Seattle	T 0–0 ^{2OT}	0–1–1	Championship Field (465); Seattle, WA
September 6*; 2:00 p.m.		vs. No. 2 Indiana	L 1–2 ^{OT}	0–2–1	Alumni Stadium; Notre Dame, IN
September 8*; 5:00 p.m., ACCNX		at No. 11 Notre Dame	L 0–1	0–3–1	Alumni Field (641); Notre Dame, IN
September 13*; 8:00 p.m., P12N+		at No. 3 Stanford	L 0–2	0–4–1	Cagan Stadium (2,304); Stanford, CA
September 15*; 1:00 p.m., P12N		at California	W 1–0	1–4–1	Edwards Stadium (217); Berkeley, CA
September 21*; 5:00 p.m., Altitude 2		No. 8 SMU	L 1–2 ^{OT}	1–5–1	DU Soccer Stadium (2,715); Denver, CO
Summit League regular season
September 28; 1:00 p.m., Altitude		Eastern Illinois	T 0–0 ^{2OT}	1–5–2 (0–0–1)	DU Soccer Stadium (632); Denver, CO
September 30*; 5:00 p.m., ACCNX		at Pittsburgh	L 2–3 ^{2OT}	1–6–2	Ambrose Urbanic Field (279); Pittsburgh, PA
October 6*; 2:00 p.m.		Pacific	W 2–1	2–6–2	DU Soccer Stadium (532); Denver, CO
October 12; 12:00 p.m., ESPN+		at Western Illinois	L 3–4	2–7–2 (0–1–1)	MacKenzie Alumni Field (249); Macomb, IL
October 15*; 6:00 p.m., ESPN+		at Saint Louis	L 0–1	2–8–2	Hermann Stadium (472); St. Louis, MO
October 19; 6:00 p.m.		at Oral Roberts	L 0–1 ^{OT}	2–9–2 (0–2–1)	Case Soccer Complex (801); Tulsa, OK
October 22*; 6:00 p.m.		at Tulsa	T 1–1 ^{2OT}	2–9–3	Hurricane Stadium (184); Tulsa, OK
October 26; 7:00 p.m., Altitude		Omaha	W 2–0	3–9–3 (1–2–1)	DU Soccer Stadium (778); Denver, CO
October 29*; 5:00 p.m., ACCNX		at Duke	L 0–1	3–10–3	Koskinen Stadium (208); Durham, NC
November 2*; 7:00 p.m.		Rhode Island	L 1–2 ^{OT}	3–11–3	DU Soccer Stadium (417); Denver, CO
November 9; 5:00 p.m.		at Purdue Fort Wayne	W 3–1	4–11–3 (2–2–1)	Hefner Soccer Complex (120); Fort Wayne, IN
Summit League Tournament
November 14; 4:00 p.m.	(3)	(2) Oral Roberts; Semifinals	W 2–0	5–11–3	DU Soccer Stadium (201); Denver, CO
November 16; 2:00 p.m.	(3)	(4) Omaha; Championship Game	W 1–0	6–11–3	DU Soccer Stadium (411); Denver, CO
NCAA Tournament
November 21; 6:00 p.m., ESPN3		at No. 12 Missouri State; First Round	L 0–1	6–12–3	Allison South Stadium (1,087); Springfield, MO
*Non-conference game. ^{#}Rankings from United Soccer Coaches. (#) Tournament seedings in parentheses. All times are in Mountain Time.
