= 2023 Summit League men's soccer tournament =

- Classification: Division I
- Teams: 4
- Matches: 3
- Attendance: 1,671
- Site: Case Soccer Complex; Tulsa, Oklahoma
- Champions: Omaha (2nd title)
- Winning coach: Donovan Dowling (1st title)
- MVP: Nathanel Sallah (Omaha)
- Broadcast: ESPN+

2023 Summit League men's soccer standings
	Conf.					Overall
Team	W		L		T	W		L		T
Denver +	6	–	0	–	1	12	–	3	–	5
Oral Roberts	4	–	1	–	2	10	–	4	–	3
Omaha ‡	3	–	2	–	2	8	–	8	–	4
Kansas City	2	–	2	–	3	4	–	8	–	6
St. Thomas (MN) ^{#}	0	–	5	–	2	3	–	10	–	3
Western Illinois	1	–	6	–	0	2	–	14	–	1
‡ – 2023 Summit tournament champion + – At-large invitation to the 2023 NCAA tournament ^{#} – Ineligible for post-season (In transition); As of December 12, 2023; Rankings from United Soccer Coaches; Source: Summit

The 2023 Summit League men's soccer tournament was the postseason men's soccer tournament for the Summit League held on November 9 and 11, 2023. The three-match tournament took place at Case Soccer Complex in Tulsa, Oklahoma. The four-team single-elimination tournament consisted of two rounds based on seeding from regular season conference play. The Denver Pioneers were the defending champions. Denver was unable to defended their title, falling to Kansas City in a penalty shoot-out in the First Round. Omaha would go on to defeat Kansas City in the Final 2–0 to become tournament champions. The tournament win was Omaha's second as a member of the conference, and the title was the first for head coach Donovan Dowling. As tournament champions, Omaha earned the Summit League's automatic berth into the 2023 NCAA Division I men's soccer tournament.

== Seeding ==
Four of the six Summit League men's soccer programs qualified for the 2023 Tournament. Teams were seeded based on their regular season records. Tiebreakers were used to determine the seedings of teams who finished with identical conference records. No tiebreakers were required as all teams finished with unique regular season conference records.

Seed	School	Conference Record	Points
1	Denver	6–0–1	19
2	Oral Roberts	4–1–2	14
3	Omaha	3–2–2	11
4	Kansas City	2–2–3	9
5	St. Thomas	1–5–2	5
6	Western Illinois	1–7–0	3

== Bracket ==
Semifinals; Thursday, November 9
1	Denver	3 (4)
4	Kansas City (pen.)	3 (5)
2	Oral Roberts	0
3	Omaha	1

Final; Saturday, November 11
4	Kansas City	0
3	Omaha	2

== Schedule ==
=== Semifinals ===
November 9	#1 Denver	3–3 (a.e.t.) (4–5 p)	#4 Kansas City	Tulsa, OK
3:00 p.m. CT	Oje Ofunrein 4', 18', 74', (yellow card) 68'; Bryce Willoughby (yellow card) 65'	Report	19' Christian Koffi; 31', (yellow card) 108' Julien Le Bourdoulous; 57' Mael Caisson; (yellow card) 67' Seth Kacich	Stadium: Case Soccer Complex; Attendance: 211; Referee: Nikola Aleksic; Assistant referees: Michael Cap; Kyle Armstrong; Fourth official: Edwin Zunun
	Penalties
	Jake Smith (penalty scored); Sam Bassett (penalty scored); Dylan Akau (penalty scored); Ian Smith (penalty missed); Holger Olsson (penalty scored); AJ Francois (penalty missed); Lukas Fisher (penalty missed)		(penalty scored) Seth Kacich; (penalty scored) Edson Murguia; (penalty scored) Julien Le Bourdoulous; (penalty missed) Hector Taboda; (penalty scored) Guille Munoz Villarejo; (penalty missed) Christian Koffi; (penalty scored) Miguel Fernandez

November 9	#2 Oral Roberts	0–1	#3 Omaha	Tulsa, OK
7:00 p.m. CT	Thiago Patto (yellow card) 16' (yellow-red card) 87'	Report	(yellow card) 21' Kyle Reese; (yellow card) 48' Gonzalo Cuevas; (yellow card) 84' Martin Lago; 81', (yellow card) 90' Mathis Pilon St-Louis; (yellow card) 90' Luke Smith	Stadium: Case Soccer Complex; Attendance: 1,041; Referee: Cesar Ibarra; Assistant referees: Brian Barlow; Dan Ortega; Fourth official: Reza Namavar

=== Final ===
November 11	#3 Omaha	2–0	#4 Kansas City	Tulsa, OK
2:00 p.m. CT	Theo Klein 24' (pen.); Ede Gramberg 87'	Report	(yellow card) 82' Julien Le Bourdoulous; (yellow card) 88' Robin Balters; (yellow card) 88' Seth Kacich	Stadium: Case Soccer Complex; Attendance: 419; Referee: Calin Radosav; Assistant referees: Zachary Richter; Misael Cordero; Fourth official: Brook Weiss

== Statistics ==
=== Goalscorers ===
There were 9 goals scored in 3 matches, for an average of 3 goals per match (as of November 11, 2023).

3 goals

- Oje Ofunrein – Denver

1 goal

- Mael Caisson – Kansas City
- Julien Le Bourdoulous – Kansas City
- Christian Koffi – Kansas City
- Ede Gramberg – Omaha
- Theo Klein – Omaha
- Mathis Pilon St-Louis – Omaha

== All-Tournament team ==
Player	Team
Oje Ofunrein	Denver
Aidan O'Toole	Denver
Robin Balters	Kansas City
Mael Caisson	Kansas City
Carson Lindsey	Kansas City
Naz Astwood	Omaha
Thore Boehm	Omaha
Mathis Pilon St-Louis	Omaha
**Nathanel Sallah**	Omaha
Luis Flores	Oral Roberts
Joel Quashie	Oral Roberts

MVP in bold
