= 2015 Summit League men's soccer tournament =

Tournament details
- Country: United States
- Teams: 4

Final positions
- Champions: Denver
- Runners-up: Oral Roberts

The 2015 Summit League men's soccer tournament was the tenth edition of the tournament. It determined Summit League's automatic berth into the 2015 NCAA Division I Men's Soccer Championship.

The Denver Pioneers won the tournament, defeating the Oral Roberts Golden Eagles in the championship match.

== Qualification ==
2015 Summit League men's soccer standings
	Conf.					Overall
Team	W		L		T	W		L		T
No. 10 Denver ‡	5	–	0	–	1	15	–	1	–	3
Omaha	3	–	2	–	1	9	–	6	–	3
Oral Roberts	3	–	2	–	1	7	–	7	–	4
Western Illinois	3	–	3	–	0	6	–	12	–	1
IUPUI	1	–	2	–	3	1	–	9	–	7
Fort Wayne	2	–	4	–	0	5	–	12	–	0
Eastern Illinois	1	–	5	–	0	3	–	14	–	0
‡-Tournament Champion +-Invited to the NCAA Division I Men's Soccer Championship; As of November 22, 2015; Rankings from NSCAA

The top four teams in the Summit League based on their conference regular season records qualified for the tournament.

== Bracket ==
Semifinals
1	Denver	4
4	Western Illinois	0
2	Oral Roberts (OT)	2
3	Omaha	1

Final
1	Denver	2
2	Oral Roberts	0

== Schedule ==
=== Semi-finals ===
November 12, 2015	Oral Roberts	2–1 (a.e.t.)	Omaha	Denver, Colorado
4:05 PM MT	Chimento 71'; Hill 105'	Report	Jaime 20'	Stadium: CIBER Field; Attendance: 219; Referee: Jose Corro

November 12, 2015	Denver	4–0	Western Illinois	Denver, Colorado
7:05 PM MT	Devoss 2'; Crosswait 25'; Stevenson 53'; Akamatsu 82'	Report		Stadium: CIBER Field; Attendance: 316; Referee: Marc Lawrence

=== Final ===
November 14, 2015	Denver	2–0	Oral Roberts	Denver, Colorado
3:05 PM MT	Hanlin 48'; Underwood 70'	Report		Stadium: CIBER Field; Attendance: 674; Referee: Dimitar Chavdarov

== Statistical leaders ==
=== Top goalscorers ===
Rank	Player	College	Goals

As of 15 November 2015

== Tournament Best XI ==
Note: Flags indicate national team as defined under FIFA eligibility rules; some limited exceptions apply. Players may hold more than one non-FIFA nationality.

No.	Pos.	Nation	Player
—	MF	ESP	Amadeo Carbo (Western Illinois)
—	FW	USA	Chandler Crosswait (Denver)
—	DF	USA	Scott DeVoss (Denver)
—	GK	USA	Dan Jackson (Denver)
—	MF	ESA	Edgardo Mira (Oral Roberts)
—	FW	USA	Mark Moulton (Omaha)
—	MF	USA	Cole Nelson (Omaha)
—	MF	USA	Tarik Salkicic (Oral Roberts)
—	MF	USA	Jordan Schweitzer (Denver)
—	MF	USA	Drew Whalen (Western Illinois)
—	MF	USA	Alex White (Oral Roberts)
