= The Summit League Tournament =

The Summit League Championship or The Summit League Tournament may refer to:

- The Summit League men's basketball tournament, the men's basketball championship tournament
- The Summit League women's basketball tournament, the women's basketball championship tournament
- The Summit League Men's Soccer Tournament, the men's soccer championship tournament
