= List of Senior CLASS Award men's soccer winners =

Senior CLASS Award for men's soccer
- Awarded for: the outstanding senior NCAA Division I Student-Athlete of the Year in men's soccer
- Country: United States
- First award: 2007
- Final award: 2021
- Currently held by: Noah Jensen, Oakland
- Website: http://www.seniorclassaward.com/menssoccer/

The Senior CLASS Award was presented each year to the outstanding senior NCAA Division I Student-Athlete of the Year in men's soccer. The award was established in 2007, but was discontinued in 2021.

Year	Winner	School	Reference
2007	Evan Barnes	Navy	
2008	Sam Cronin	Wake Forest	
2009	Jason Yeisley	Penn State	
2010	Anthony Ampaipitakwong	Akron	
2011	Brian Holt	Creighton	
2012	Ryan McDuff	Brown	
2013	Nick Kristock	Oakland	
2014	Alex Ivanov	Ohio State	
2015	Zach Mason	Ohio State	
2016	Jacori Hayes	Wake Forest	
2017	Jon Bakero	Wake Forest	
2018	Andre Shinyashiki	Denver	
2019	Elliot Panicco	Charlotte	
2020	Thomas M'Barek	Oakland	
2021	Noah Jensen	Oakland	
2022	Not awarded		
