= Alex Ivanov =

American soccer player

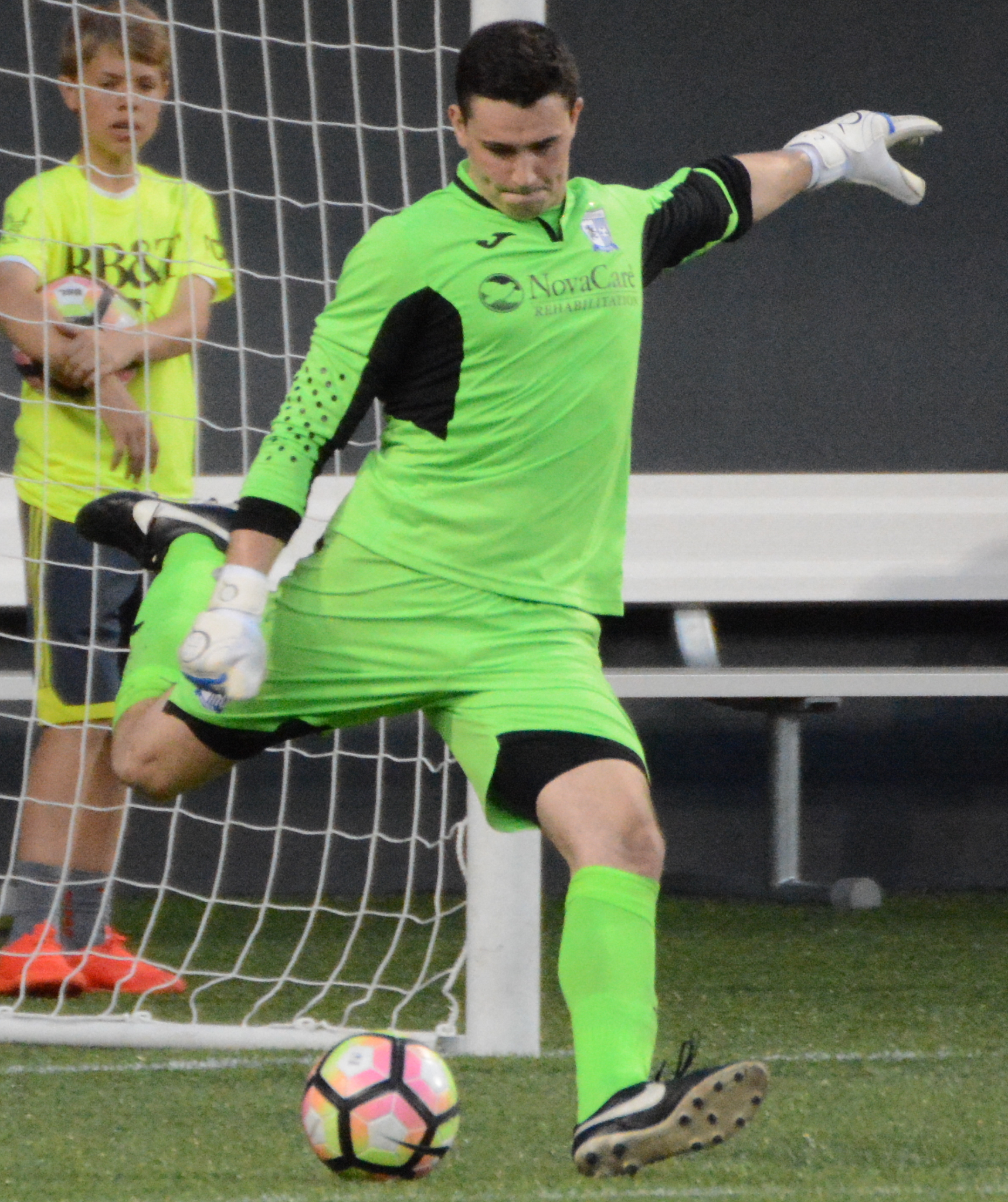
- Ivanov with AFC Cleveland in 2017

Personal information
- Date of birth: July 7, 1992 (age 34)
- Place of birth: Strongsville, Ohio, United States
- Height: 6 ft 2 in (1.88 m)
- Position: Goalkeeper

Youth career
- 2003–2006: Cleveland Whitecaps
- 2006–2010: Cleveland United

College career
Years	Team	Apps	(Gls)
2010–2014	Ohio State Buckeyes	47	(0)

Senior career*
Years	Team	Apps	(Gls)
2013–2017	AFC Cleveland		
2020	Cleveland SC	0	(0)
- * Club domestic league appearances and goals as of July 31, 2020

Alex Ivanov (born July 7, 1992) is an American soccer player who plays as a goalkeeper. He played college soccer for the Ohio State Buckeyes and also played in the NPSL with AFC Cleveland and Cleveland SC.

At the conclusion of the 2014 NCAA Division I men's soccer season, Ivanov won the men's soccer Senior CLASS Award, a national recognition for the most outstanding senior in college soccer.

== Career ==
=== Youth and college ===
Ivanov was raised in Strongsville, Ohio where he played youth soccer for Cleveland United. Ahead of the 2010 college soccer season, Ivanov who had been attending Ohio State for college, was a walk-on for the men's soccer program, where he was immediately redshirted.

Towards the final stretch of his sophomore year, Ivanov began appearing in matches for the Buckeyes. During his redshirt junior year, Ivanov secured his starting role with Ohio State. Ivanov finished his junior year being named to the All-Big Ten second team. Ivanov also finished the season with 110 saves, which was fifth all time in program history. The 110 saves was also fifth in the nation during the season.

During the 2014 spring friendlies, Ivanov was named team co-captain. During his senior year, Ivanov was nominated for the Senior CLASS Award for men's soccer, winning the award.

=== Senior ===
Ivanov went undrafted in the 2015 MLS SuperDraft. Ahead of the 2015 NPSL season, he signed on with his hometown AFC Cleveland, in 2015 he appeared in all 13 matches for Cleveland, where they reached the regional semifinals of the 2015 NPSL Playoffs.

== Personal life ==
Outside of soccer, Ivanov was a volunteer with the 2nd and 7 Foundation, the "Kids Kicking Cancer", and the "Friends of Jacly Foundation".
