= Stanley Durwood =

American businessman (1920–1999)

Stanley H. Durwood (August 5, 1920 – July 14, 1999) was a businessman and philanthropist born in Kansas City to Edward D. and Celia T. Durwood. He is known for building the first multiplex movie theater in the 1960s.

== Biography ==
Durwood attended Harvard University, and served as a navigator in the Army Air Forces in World War II, where he rose to the rank of lieutenant. He had an uncanny ability to remember the birthday of nearly everyone he met, and did one-handed push ups into his 70s. He was awarded the 1989 Salah M. Hassanein Humanitarian Award and the Vision Fund of America's 1989 Man of the Year Award. He died at age 78 on July 14, 1999. At the time of his death, he was survived by his wife, Pamela Yax, along with six children and 13 grandchildren.

Durwood's daughter Elissa married actor Charles Grodin. According to Elissa, her parents were nonobservant Jews, but they did observe Jewish holidays with observant relatives who were members of The Temple, Congregation B'nai Jehudah.

== AMC Theatres ==
In 1920, Durwood's father and uncles, Edward, Barney, and Maurice Dubinsky, bought a Kansas City movie theater which they called Regent Theater. The brothers built up the theatre chain over the next decade; by 1932 the company owned 40 theaters in Missouri and Kansas. Stanley started working with the brothers officially by 1945. When Edward (who had changed his surname to Durwood), Stanley's father, died in 1960, Stanley took over Durwood Theaters, Inc.

The 1960s were a time of changing consumer demands in the world of movie theaters, as televisions started to work their way into individual's homes. Durwood's 600 seat Roxy theater in downtown Kansas City had such low attendance that Durwood had to close off the balcony so the business would not have to cover the expense of the usher. Soon, Durwood dreamed up a solution: in 1963, Durwood opened what is believed to be the first theater designed to be a multiplex. The business model allowed theaters to attract more customers with a variety of titles. Soon, the number of screens had grown to more than two dozen in some cities. In 1968, Durwood changed the company name to connect it to the multiplex: Durwood Theatres became American Multi-Cinema.

Durwood kept innovating beyond the multiplex, as well. He is widely credited with the idea of arm rest cup holders and stadium-style seating in theaters. At his death in July 1999, AMC was the fourth-largest movie exhibition company in the world. In 2016, AMC became the largest movie theater chain in the world.

== Involvement in Kansas City Community ==
Durwood grew up in Kansas City, where he graduated from Pembroke-Country Day School. He wanted to see the city revitalized and worked to get people back to the urban core. He was central in the plans for the Power & Light District. His company "invested in Power & Light with no assurance of a return." Durwood described "an elevated train that would transport visitors to the Power & Light District from the Country Club Plaza. He also suggested that eight Midwestern states should be merged into one, with Kansas City as its seat of government. Colleagues said such grand visions were vintage Durwood - a blend of business practicality with a twist of the seemingly impossible.

He was a member of the Pembroke Hill Alumni Association and the Harvard Radcliffe Club of Kansas City. He was a founding member of Downtown, Inc., presently known as the Downtown Council. After Durwood died from esophageal cancer in 1999, the Stanley H. Durwood Foundation (better known as the Durwood Foundation) was established to help fund early childhood education programs in the Kansas City Area. Raymond E. Beagle, Jr. and Charles J. Egan, Jr. were the co-trustees of the Durwood Foundation at the time of establishment. As of March 2019, it had made more than $40 million grants. UMKC's Stanley H. Durwood soccer stadium was named in his honor, as was the film vault at the Kansas City Central Library.

The Kansas City Council, recognizing Durwood, Kansas City entrepreneur and legend of the theatrical exhibition industry, declared July 23, 1999 as "Stan Durwood Day" in Kansas City.
