= Bob Bozada =

American soccer player and coach (born 1959)

Personal information
- Full name: Robert Bozada
- Date of birth: January 7, 1959 (age 67)
- Place of birth: St. Louis, Missouri, U.S.
- Positions: Defender; midfielder; forward

Youth career
- 1977–1979: SIU Edwardsville Cougars

Senior career*
Years	Team	Apps	(Gls)
1980	Minnesota Kicks	0	(0)
1980–1981	Minnesota Kicks (indoor)	11	(6)
1980–1982	St. Louis Steamers (indoor)	27	(7)
1982–1984	Kansas City Comets (indoor)	21	(3)
1984	Houston Dynamos		(4)
1984–1985	Kalamazoo Kangaroos (indoor)		(3)

Managerial career
- 1987–1989: UMKC Kangaroos
- * Club domestic league appearances and goals

Robert "Bob" Bozada is an American former soccer player who played professionally in the North American Soccer League and the Major Indoor Soccer League.

== Player ==
Bozada attended St. Thomas Aquinas High School in Florissant, MO. There, in 1975, he helped lead the Falcons to their first state soccer championship. After graduating from Aquinas in 1977, Bozada moved on to Southern Illinois University Edwardsville, playing on the men's soccer team from 1977 to 1979. In 1979, Bozada led the Cougars to win the NCAA Men's Division I Soccer Championship, a 3–2 victory over the Clemson Tigers.

Later that year Bozada was selected to play on the United States Olympic team, representing the USA in the 1980 Olympics in Moscow. He was the youngest player on the Olympic team at 20 years old. In 1980, the Minnesota Kicks selected Bozada in the second round of the North American Soccer League draft. He played no games during the 1980 outdoor season, and eleven during the 1980-1981 NASL indoor season. The Kicks then traded him to the St. Louis Steamers of the Major Indoor Soccer League. After two seasons with the Steamers, he finished his career with two seasons with the Kansas City Comets. He later played for the Kalamazoo Kangaroos of the American Indoor Soccer Association.

== Coach ==
Following his playing career, Bozada worked with Welsh soccer star, Clive Griffiths, in starting the International Soccer Organization, which took the top youth players in America ages 12–18 to Europe to complete in international (mostly European) soccer Tournaments in the summer.

In 1989, Bozada became the first head coach of the University of Missouri–Kansas City men's soccer team. He compiled a 49-29-1 record over six seasons. Bozada also worked for the Kansas City Wizards from 2007 to 2011.

== Family ==
Bozada has two sons, Robert, born in 1985 and Kevin in 1988. Both were accomplished athletes growing up with Kevin taking 1st team all-state honors in both soccer and lacrosse in high school and later playing on the University of Oregon Men's Lacrosse team in 2007–2009.
