= Bryan Pérez =

Costa Rican footballer

Personal information
- Full name: Bryan Pérez
- Date of birth: November 1, 1987 (age 38)
- Place of birth: San José, Costa Rica
- Height: 5 ft 5 in (1.65 m)
- Position: Midfielder

Team information
- Current team: Kansas City Comets
- Number: 9

Youth career
- 1996–1999: Saprissa

College career
Years	Team	Apps	(Gls)
2006–2009	UMKC Kangaroos	78	(29)

Senior career*
Years	Team	Apps	(Gls)
2008–2009	Kansas City Brass	22	(0)
2010	Miami FC	2	(0)
2010–2011	Missouri Comets (indoor)	20	(1)
2011	Des Moines Menace	15	(5)
2011–2012	Wichita Wings (indoor)	29	(21)
2012–2013	Syracuse Silver Knights (indoor)	17	(8)
2012–2013	Milwaukee Wave (indoor)	5	(2)
2012–2013	Wichita Wings (indoor)	5	(2)
2013–2019	Kansas City Comets (indoor)	123	(98)
2019–2020	Wichita Wings (indoor)	10	(7)

International career
2012–	United States futsal		
- * Club domestic league appearances and goals as of 19 April 2021

Bryan Pérez (born November 1, 1988) is a former professional footballer and coach.

== Career ==
=== Youth and college ===
As a child, Pérez was a member of Costa Rican powerhouse Saprissa's Futbol Academy, and at the age of 11 he was chosen to be a member of Saprissa traveling youth club. Pérez moved with his family to Miramar, Florida in the early 2000s; he attended Miami Killian High School, and went on to play four years of college soccer at the University of Missouri-Kansas City, ending his career there as the team's all-time leader in goals (29), points (70), shots(160), and games played (78).

During his college years, Pérez also played with Kansas City Brass in the USL Premier Development League.

=== Professional ===
Pérez was signed by Miami FC of the USSF Division 2 Professional League in February 2010. He made his professional debut on 19 June 2010, as a substitute in a 3–1 loss to the Austin Aztex, but played just one more game for Miami before being released by the team mid-season.

Having been able to secure a professional contract with another team, Pérez signed to play for Des Moines Menace in the USL Premier Development League in 2011.

=== International ===
Although Perez has not yet been called up to any national team, he has expressed a preference to play for the Costa Rica national team, should the opportunity arise. Pérez holds dual citizenship with Costa Rica and the United States.
