= Andre Shinyashiki =

Brazilian footballer (born 1997)

Personal information
- Full name: Andre Bava Shinyashiki
- Date of birth: 11 June 1997 (age 29)
- Place of birth: São Paulo, Brazil
- Height: 1.75 m (5 ft 9 in)
- Position: Forward

Youth career
- 2011–2012: Nacional-SP
- 2013–2014: Pequeninos do Jockey

College career
Years	Team	Apps	(Gls)
2014	Montverde Academy		
2014–2018	Denver Pioneers	83	(51)

Senior career*
Years	Team	Apps	(Gls)
2017–2018	Colorado Rapids U-23	26	(18)
2019–2022	Colorado Rapids	86	(16)
2018–2019	→ Colorado Springs Switchbacks (loan)	2	(0)
2022–2023	Charlotte FC	26	(6)
2023–2024	Neftçi	32	(4)
2025–2026	Arda Kardzhali	34	(3)
- * Club domestic league appearances and goals as of 6 October 2026

Andre Bava Shinyashiki (born 11 June 1997) is a Brazilian professional footballer who plays as a forward. He was named the recipient of the 2019 MLS Rookie of the Year award as well as the 2018 men's soccer Senior CLASS Award, a national recognition awarded to the top men's collegiate senior in college soccer.

== Career ==
=== Youth and college ===
Shinyashiki played early in his youth for the Brazilian youth club Pequeninos do Jockey. He then played high school soccer for the Montverde Academy in Florida. While at Montverde, he was named the Montverde Academy Soccer Tournament (MAST) MVP, earning All-Tournament Team honors and winning the MAST Golden Boot. Shinyashiki helped lead Montverde to an unprecedented 117-match unbeaten streak and national championships in 2013 and 2014.

Shinyashiki played in college for the University of Denver Pioneers. Entering the 2015 NCAA Division I men's soccer season, Shinyashiki was ranked the 79th best player in the nation of the high school class of 2015 by CollegeSoccerNews.com. TopDrawerSoccer.com had listed Shinyashiki on their All-American watch list. He finished his freshman season making 19 appearances, 16 of which were starts, and scored 5 goals. He finished the season being named the Summit League Newcomer of the Year.

During Shinyashiki's sophomore and junior years, he scored nine goals each season. During the 2016 season, he helped the Pioneers earn their first ever final-four (College Cup) appearance at the NCAA Division I Men's Soccer Tournament.

Shinyashiki's senior year began with him scoring 19 goals in 9 matches. He finished the season with 28 goals in 21 matches, setting the goals record for the 2018 NCAA Division I men's soccer season, and the most goals in a single NCAA college soccer season in 20 years, three behind Wojtek Krakowiak's 31 goals in 1998. Shinyashiki was listed as one of the runners-up for the Hermann Trophy and the TopDrawerSoccer.com National Player of the Year Award. His college career ended with him being awarded the Summit League Men's Soccer Offensive Player of the Year and the Senior CLASS Award for men's soccer.

=== Professional ===
From 2017 to 2018, Shinyashiki played in the Premier Development League with the Colorado Rapids U-23 team.

On 11 January 2019, he was selected by Colorado Rapids with the fifth pick of the 2019 MLS SuperDraft. On 2 March 2019, against the Portland Timbers, he scored his first professional goal in his debut to tie up the match in the 94th minute on a snowy pitch in blizzard conditions, with an ambient air temperature of 18° F (-8° C).

After his successful debut season with the Rapids, Shinyashiki was selected as the 2019 MLS Rookie of the Year. Shinyashiki had seven goals and three assists across 31 appearances (18 starts) in his rookie campaign. Shinyashiki established himself as an impact player for Colorado as the club compiled an unbeaten 5-0-3 record in regular season matches where he recorded either a goal or an assist.

Shinyashiki continued his success in 2020, starting 14 of Colorado's 19 matches, including the Rapids' first-round playoff loss. Shinyashiki scored four goals and added one assist in the last eight matches of the regular season. Shinyashiki was named to the MLS Team of the Week after scoring in Colorado's 3-1 win over Seattle Sounders FC in Week 22.

Shinyashiki was transferred to Charlotte FC in May 2022 in exchange for a guaranteed $225,000 in 2022 General Allocation Money (GAM). During his time at Charlotte FC, Shinyashiki scored 6 goals in 26 appearances.

His contract with Charlotte FC was mutually terminated on August 1, 2023. On the same day, he moved to Azerbaijani club Neftçi PFK. He played a total of 38 official matches for the club and scored 5 goals. On November 26, 2024, Shinyashiki's contract with Neftçi was mutually terminated.

On 13 February 2025, Bulgarian First League club Arda Kardzhali announced the signing of Shinyashiki. He remained with the team for a season and a half, leaving in June 2026 after his contract was not extended.

== Career statistics ==
=== Club ===
As of match played 5 May 2022

Appearances and goals by club, season and competition
Club	Season	League			National cup		League cup		Continental		Total	
Club	Season	Division	Apps	Goals	Apps	Goals	Apps	Goals	Apps	Goals	Apps	Goals
Colorado Rapids	2019	MLS	31	7	—		—		—		31	7
Colorado Rapids	2020	MLS	15	4	—		1	0	—		16	4
Colorado Rapids	2021	MLS	32	4	—		0	0	—		32	4
Colorado Rapids	2022	MLS	8	1	0	0	0	0	1	0	9	1
Colorado Rapids	Total		86	16	0	0	1	0	1	0	88	16
Colorado Springs (loan)	2019	USL	2	0	—		—		—		2	0
Career total			88	16	0	0	1	0	1	0	90	16

== Personal life ==
Shinyashiki's father Roberto is a Brazilian psychiatrist and author. Shinyashiki is of Japanese descent through his father and Italian descent through his mother. Shinyashiki is eligible to represent Brazil, Japan and Italy in international soccer.

On May 2, 2023, The Charlotte Ledger published an article revealing that Shinyashiki was linked to a report of sexual assault filed with the Charlotte-Mecklenburg Police Department. Shinyashiki was released by Charlotte FC shortly thereafter.

== Honors ==
Individual

- MLS Rookie of the Year: 2019
- Senior CLASS Award: 2018
