= Kansas City Roos men's soccer =

Men's soccer team of the University of Missouri–Kansas City

- 2026 Kansas City Roos men's soccer team
- Founded: 1987; 39 years ago
- University: University of Missouri–Kansas City
- Head coach: Ryan Pore (7th season)
- Conference: Summit League
- Location: Kansas City, Missouri, US
- Stadium: Durwood Soccer Stadium (capacity: 850)
- Nickname: Roos
- Colors: Blue and gold
Home	Away

NCAA tournament Round of 16
- 2024

NCAA tournament Round of 32
- 2001, 2024, 2025

NCAA tournament appearances
- 2001, 2003, 2008, 2024, 2025

Conference tournament championships
- 2001, 2003, 2008, 2024

Conference regular season championships
- 1996, 1999, 2001, 2003, 2010, 2025, 2026

The Kansas City Roos men's soccer team is the intercollegiate soccer program representing the University of Missouri–Kansas City in Kansas City, Missouri. The Roos compete in the Summit League in Division I of the National Collegiate Athletic Association (NCAA), and play their home games at Durwood Soccer Stadium.

The program played its first varsity season in 1987. It has won seven regular-season conference championships and four conference tournament titles, and has made five appearances in the NCAA tournament, reaching the third round in 2024. The team has been coached by Ryan Pore since 2020.

== History ==
=== Early years (1987–1997) ===
Kansas City played its first varsity season in 1987 under Bob Bozada, finishing 4–11–0. Bozada was followed by Kelly Ross (1990–1992) and Mike Brown (1993–1997). The program competed in the Mid-Continent Conference from 1994, and in 1996 Brown led the team to its first outright regular-season conference championship with a 5–0–1 league record, earning conference Coach of the Year honors.

=== Rick Benben era (1998–2019) ===
Rick Benben became head coach in 1998 and led the program for 22 seasons, the longest tenure in its history, finishing with a record of 148–212–40. Kansas City shared Mid-Continent regular-season titles in 1999, 2001 and 2003. In 2001, the Kangaroos won their first conference tournament, beating Oakland on penalties and IUPUI 2–1, and then beat Wisconsin–Milwaukee 2–1 in overtime in the first round of the NCAA tournament. It was the first NCAA Division I tournament victory by any UMKC program. The Kangaroos lost 2–1 to second-ranked Saint Louis in the second round.

Kansas City won the conference tournament again in 2003, beating top-seeded Oakland 1–0 in the final, before losing 6–0 at Creighton in the first round of the NCAA tournament. After the Mid-Continent Conference became the Summit League, the Kangaroos won the 2008 Summit League tournament on penalties against Oakland and lost 1–0 at Tulsa in the first round of the NCAA tournament. Kansas City won the Summit League regular-season title in 2010. Benben was inducted into the UMKC Athletic Hall of Fame as part of its 2011–12 class, as was the 2001 team. The program moved to the Western Athletic Conference in 2013, and did not post a winning season in its seven WAC seasons.

=== Ryan Pore era (2020–present) ===
Former Kansas City Wizards player Ryan Pore, previously an assistant coach at Tulsa, was hired in 2020 as Kansas City returned to the Summit League. Pore was named Summit League Coach of the Year in his first season.

In 2024, Kansas City won its first conference tournament in 16 years when Elie Kisoka scored with 13 seconds remaining to beat top-seeded Denver 2–1 in the Summit League final, sending the Roos to the NCAA tournament for the first time since 2008. In the NCAA tournament, the Roos won 2–0 at Saint Louis and 2–1 at fifteenth-ranked Missouri State, before losing 3–2 to second-ranked Pittsburgh on a 98th-minute golden goal in the third round. Kisoka was named the Summit League's Offensive Player of the Year and Newcomer of the Year.

In 2025, Kansas City won a share of its first Summit League regular-season title since 2010 and received an at-large bid to the NCAA tournament, where it hosted its first NCAA tournament match and beat Lindenwood 1–0. The Roos lost 1–0 at Stanford in the second round. In 2026, Kansas City reached fourth in the United Soccer Coaches poll, the highest national ranking for any UMKC program, and clinched its second consecutive regular-season title. Pore was named Summit League Coach of the Year for the third consecutive season.

== Players ==
=== Current roster ===
As of November 6, 2026

Note: Flags indicate national team as defined under FIFA eligibility rules; some limited exceptions apply. Players may hold more than one non-FIFA nationality.

No.	Pos.	Nation	Player
0	GK	USA	Brandon Kincaid
1	GK	POL	Marc Popow
2	DF	FRA	Mark Ramarola
3	DF	USA	Brevyn Cole
4	DF	ESP	Guille Munoz
5	DF	USA	Bryson Gosch
6	MF	ESP	Miguel Fernandez
7	MF	USA	Bryce Outman
8	MF	FRA	Mathias Baucher
9	FW	FRA	Jeremy Francou
10	MF	ITA	Gabriele Galluccio
11	FW	ESP	Mariano Beunza
12	DF	CZE	Ales Kohoutek
13	DF	AUT	Jonas Rossdorfer
14	MF	FRA	Elouan Labadie-Vincent
15	DF	USA	Carter Santa

No.	Pos.	Nation	Player
16	MF	USA	Makhi Francis
17	MF	JPN	Shotaro Kodama
18	FW	USA	Ethan Schaefer
19	FW	FRA	Pablo Morato
20	MF	BRA	Raphael Kistmann
21	FW	USA	Ian Witis-Hughes
22	DF	USA	Wesley Cribb
23	MF	ITA	Gabriel Santuari
24	GK	USA	Adam Lansdown
28	FW	USA	Brice Middleton
29	FW	USA	Brice Miller Jr.
30	GK	USA	Brendan Mikuliza
31	MF	ITA	Alessandro Patelli
32	MF	FRA	Kevin Nkumu
33	DF	JPN	Rihito Kaji
34	DF	ARG	Juan Pablo Salgado Canepa

=== Notable alumni ===
This is a list of former players who have played professional soccer.

- Roberto Albuquerque
- Manny Catano
- Levi Coleman
- Kevin Corby
- Eric McWoods
- Jony Muñoz
- Bryan Pérez
- Jordan Rideout
- Connor Sparrow

=== All-Americans ===
Year	Player	Selector
2001	Larry Scheller	College Soccer News (honorable mention)

=== Conference Players of the Year ===
Year	Player	Award
1996	Mike Anderson	Player of the Year
1999	Erik Kuster	Player of the Year
2001	Larry Scheller	Player of the Year
2008	Brian Harris	Offensive Player of the Year
2009	Bryan Pérez	Offensive Player of the Year
2010	John Bayron Sosa	Offensive Player of the Year
2010	Brian Quintana	Defensive Player of the Year
2020	Cooper Clark	Goalkeeper of the Year
2021	Cooper Clark	Goalkeeper of the Year
2024	Elie Kisoka	Offensive Player of the Year

=== Hall of Fame ===
The following have been inducted into the UMKC Athletics Hall of Fame:

- Larry Scheller (2008)
- Dan Hilson (2010)
- Brian Evans (2011)
- Rick Benben, coach (2011)
- 2001 team (2011)
- Jason Woods (2012)
- Brendan Flanagan (2013)
- Eric Parrish (2015)
- Bryan Pérez (2016)

== Coaches ==
=== Coaching staff ===
Position	Name
Head coach	(United States) Ryan Pore
Associate head coach	Rafael Martinez
Assistant coach	Nick McDonald
Goalkeeping coach	Filippo Errico

=== Head coaching history ===
Coach	Tenure	Record
Bob Bozada	1987–1989	9–29–1
Kelly Ross	1990–1992	10–39–3
Mike Brown	1993–1997	45–51–2
Rick Benben	1998–2019	148–212–40
Ryan Pore	2020–present	56–40–27

Through October 31, 2026.

== Facilities ==
Kansas City plays at Stanley H. Durwood Soccer Stadium and Recreational Field, a $9 million facility funded by a gift from the Durwood Foundation. The stadium seats 850 and includes press suites, a ticket booth and a concession stand, with a separate building housing locker rooms and coaches' offices. The National Women's Soccer League's FC Kansas City began playing its home games at the stadium in 2014. Since 2020, the university has invested in upgrades including a professional-grade artificial turf surface, and in 2025 it added a field-level hospitality area, the Corner Kick Club, and two suites.

== Seasons ==
Year	Head coach	Record	Conference	Conf. record	Conf. finish	Conf. tournament	NCAA tournament
1987	Bob Bozada	4–11–0	–	–	–	–	–
1988	Bob Bozada	3–8–1	–	–	–	–	–
1989	Bob Bozada	2–10–0	–	–	–	–	–
1990	Kelly Ross	4–11–1	–	–	–	–	–
1991	Kelly Ross	4–11–2	–	–	–	–	–
1992	Kelly Ross	2–17–0	–	–	–	–	–
1993	Mike Brown	7–13–0	–	–	–	–	–
1994	Mike Brown	10–10–0	Mid-Con	5–3–0	2nd (West)	Semifinals	–
1995	Mike Brown	9–10–0	Mid-Con	4–4–0	2nd (West)	Semifinals	–
1996	Mike Brown	10–7–2	Mid-Con	5–0–1	1st (West)	Semifinals	–
1997	Mike Brown	9–11–0	Mid-Con	6–2–0	2nd (West)	Semifinals	–
1998	Rick Benben	6–14–0	Mid-Con	3–2–0	T–2nd	Runner-up	–
1999	Rick Benben	11–6–0	Mid-Con	3–2–0	T–1st	Semifinals	–
2000	Rick Benben	8–10–0	Mid-Con	2–3–0	T–3rd	Semifinals	–
2001	Rick Benben	12–7–1	Mid-Con	3–2–0	T–1st	Champions	Second round
2002	Rick Benben	7–10–1	Mid-Con	2–3–0	T–4th	Semifinals	–
2003	Rick Benben	10–7–3	Mid-Con	5–1–0	T–1st	Champions	First round
2004	Rick Benben	4–11–2	Mid-Con	3–3–0	T–3rd	Semifinals	–
2005	Rick Benben	3–10–3	Mid-Con	2–4–0	6th	–	–
2006	Rick Benben	5–13–2	Mid-Con	4–2–0	2nd	Runner-up	–
2007	Rick Benben	7–8–4	Summit	2–2–2	T–3rd	Semifinals	–
2008	Rick Benben	10–7–3	Summit	3–3–0	T–3rd	Champions	First round
2009	Rick Benben	7–10–2	Summit	2–2–2	4th	Runner-up	–
2010	Rick Benben	10–5–3	Summit	4–1–1	1st	Semifinals	–
2011	Rick Benben	5–9–3	Summit	2–2–2	5th	–	–
2012	Rick Benben	7–10–2	Summit	5–2–0	2nd	Semifinals	–
2013	Rick Benben	4–11–4	WAC	3–6–1	T–6th	First round	–
2014	Rick Benben	8–10–2	WAC	5–4–1	5th	Semifinals	–
2015	Rick Benben	6–9–2	WAC	4–5–1	T–7th	–	–
2016	Rick Benben	2–12–2	WAC	1–7–2	11th	–	–
2017	Rick Benben	5–10–3	WAC	3–7–0	9th	–	–
2018	Rick Benben	5–12–0	WAC	4–7–0	9th	–	–
2019	Rick Benben	6–11–0	WAC	5–6–0	T–7th	First round	–
2020	Ryan Pore	5–8–1	Summit	5–4–1	4th	–	–
2021	Ryan Pore	3–7–5	Summit	2–2–2	4th	Semifinals	–
2022	Ryan Pore	7–5–5	Summit	4–1–3	4th	Runner-up	–
2023	Ryan Pore	4–8–6	Summit	2–3–3	4th	Runner-up	–
2024	Ryan Pore	14–5–3	Summit	5–2–1	2nd	Champions	Third round
2025	Ryan Pore	12–4–5	Summit	4–1–1	T–1st	Runner-up	Second round
2026	Ryan Pore	11–3–2	Summit	4–1–0	1st		

== Honours ==
- Conference regular season
  - Champions (7): 1996, 1999 (Note: Shared title.), 2001, 2003, 2010, 2025, 2026
- Conference tournament
  - Champions (4): 2001, 2003, 2008, 2024
  - Runners-up (6): 1998, 2006, 2009, 2022, 2023, 2025
