= Kansas City Roos =

Athletic program of the University of Missouri–Kansas City

- University: University of Missouri–Kansas City
- Nickname: Kangaroos or Roos
- NCAA: Division I
- Conference: Summit League
- Athletic director: Brandon Martin
- Location: Kansas City, Missouri
- Varsity teams: 16
- Basketball arena: Swinney Recreation Center (men and women)
- Softball stadium: Urban Youth Academy Softball Complex
- Soccer stadium: Durwood Soccer Stadium
- Other venues: Plaza Tennis Center; Hy-Vee Arena (Track & field); Municipal Auditorium
- Colors: Blue and gold
- Mascot: Kasey Kangaroo
- Website: kcroos.com
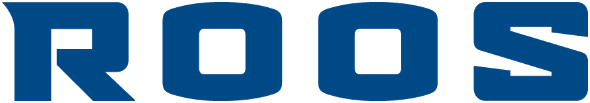

The Kansas City Roos, known before July 1, 2019, as the UMKC Kangaroos and also sometimes called the Kansas City Kangaroos, are the intercollegiate teams representing the University of Missouri–Kansas City that compete in the National Collegiate Athletic Association's Division I. The Roos formerly competed in the Western Athletic Conference (WAC) but, as of July 1, 2020 the Kansas City Roos became members of the Summit League in all 14 varsity sports.

== Sports ==
As a member of the Summit League the University of Missouri–Kansas City sponsors six men's and eight women's teams in NCAA-sanctioned sports.

Men's sports	Women's sports
Basketball	Basketball
Cross country	Cross country
Golf	Soccer
Soccer	Softball
Track and Field^{†}	Tennis
	Volleyball
	Track and Field^{†}
† = Track and field includes both indoor and outdoor.

== Soccer ==
Men's soccer was a member of the NCAA Division I Summit League from 1994 to 2013, and won the league men's soccer championships in 1996, 1999, 2001, 2003, and 2010. The team then played seven seasons in the NCAA Division I Western Athletic Conference, returning to the Summit League in 2020. The team set an NCAA record on October 12, 2001, with the fastest trio of goals scored in Division I soccer during the MLS era, by scoring three times in 1:46 against Valparaiso University.

== Conference affiliations ==
- 1969–70 to 1985–86 – NAIA Independent
- 1986–87 to 1993–94 – NCAA Division I Independent
- 1994–95 to 2012–13 – Summit League
- 2013–14 to 2019–20 – Western Athletic Conference
- 2020–21 to present – Summit League

== Name ==
The nickname was chosen in the 1930s for the school's debate team, following the acquisition of two baby kangaroos by the Kansas City Zoo.

The school has long branded itself for athletic purposes as "UMKC", but in June 2019, shortly before it announced its return to the Summit League, it unveiled a new logo and branding strategy emphasizing "Kansas City", and officially unveiled its full rebranding as the Kansas City Roos on July 1 of that year.

While its previous conference, the WAC, used "UMKC", its current conference, the Summit League, uses "Kansas City". As part of the 2019 rebranding, the program is now known as Kansas City Athletics. Teams will be known as the Kansas City Roos, with "Roos" having long been used as a short form for the historic nickname of Kangaroos. The national media had been inconsistent in usage prior to the 2019 rebranding.
