= Al F. Caniglia Field =

Stadium in Omaha, Nebraska, U.S.

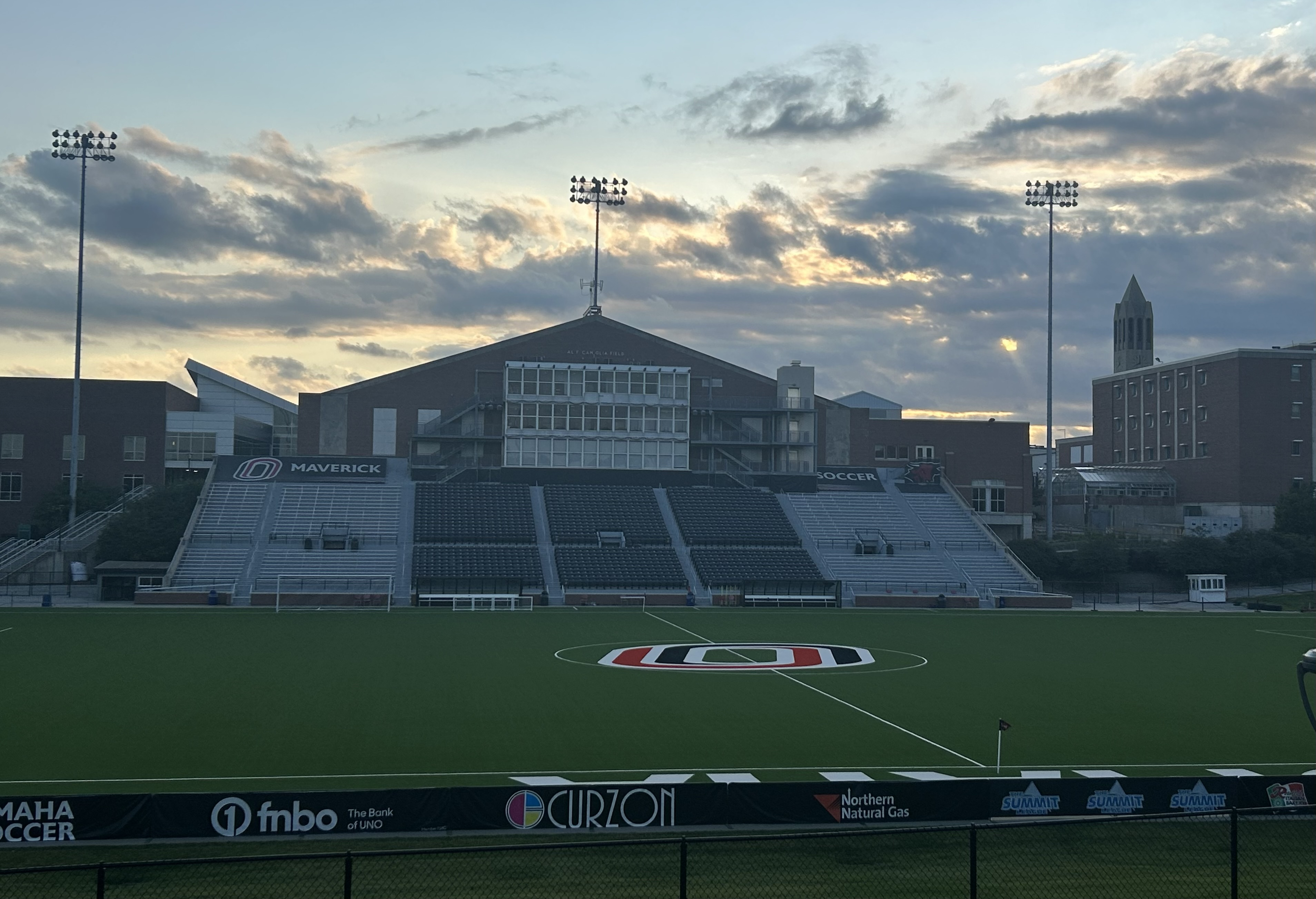
- Al Caniglia Field 2025
- Interactive map of Al F. Caniglia Field
- Location: Omaha, Nebraska
- Coordinates: 41.25710917677493°N 96.00736325550429°W
- Owner: University of Nebraska Omaha
- Operator: University of Nebraska Omaha
- Capacity: 3,097 (soccer) 9,500 (football)
- Record attendance: 13,000 (August 18, 2004; Omaha vs Kearney football)

Construction
- Opened: October 1, 1949
- Renovated: 2013
- Reopened: October 26, 2013
- General contractor: Hellas Sports Construction (renovation)

Tenants
- Omaha Mavericks football (1949–2011); Omaha Mavericks men's soccer (2013–present); Omaha Mavericks women's soccer (2013–present)

Al F. Caniglia Field is a stadium located on the campus of the University of Nebraska at Omaha in Omaha, Nebraska. Beginning on October 26, 2013, it became home of the Omaha Mavericks men's and women's soccer teams. It was the former home of the Omaha Maverick football team from 1949 to 2011.

Caniglia Field seats 3,097 fans and features 1,390 chairback seats and VIP boxes. The field features a 21-foot by 42-foot LED video board and scoreboard. The Omaha soccer pitch, installed by Hellas Construction, is the only NCAA Division I field to receive the prestigious FIFA Recommended 2-Star certification. The state-of-the-art soccer-specific turf features a lower grain that allows the ball to move faster and an infill of ground coconut husks and cork to keep the on-field temperature lower.

== History ==
The stadium was the former home of the NCAA Division II UNO Mavericks football and track teams. The UNO football team moved from Saratoga Field to Caniglia Field in 1949. The first game was played at Caniglia on October 1, 1949, against Northern Illinois.

Caniglia Field received many updates while it hosted the football team. The stadium was converted from grass to turf, and lights were added to the field in the 1970s. The pressbox received upgrades in 2000. A new videoboard was built on the south end of the field, and was completed in time for the 2010 football season.

When Omaha discontinued its football program in 2011, Caniglia Field was renovated to become the home of the Maverick men's and women's soccer programs. The main seating structure on the west side of the field remained in place, while the north stands were removed and the east stands were replaced by a grass berm. The track was also removed to widen the pitch, and the former artificial turf was replaced. Caniglia Field reopened on October 26, 2013 when the Omaha men's soccer team faced Oral Roberts.

The stadium is named in honor of former football head coach, Al Caniglia. Caniglia was the Maverick head coach from 1960 to 1973. He was the fourth winningest coach in Omaha history with a record of 74–55–5.

Caniglia field has a statue outside the north end of the stadium honoring former Omaha quarterback Marlin Briscoe. Briscoe was the Omaha quarterback from 1963 to 1967. He led the team to three conference championships, and set 22 school records. He was drafted 14th overall by the Denver Broncos, and became the first black quarterback to ever start a game in professional football. He was inducted in the College Football Hall of Fame in 2016.

== Events ==
=== College Football ===
The stadium hosted the 1990 NAIA Division II football national championship game between Peru State and Westminster College. The Peru State Bobcats won its first national title, defeating Westminster 17-7. It also was the site of the semifinal game between Peru State and Baker.

Caniglia Field was home to several NCAA Division II football playoff games involving the Omaha Mavericks football team. It hosted a first-round game in 1996, second-round games in 2000, 2005, 2006, and 2007, and a quarterfinal in 1984 and 2000.

=== College Soccer ===
In 2017, the stadium hosted the Summit League Men's Soccer Championship. The Omaha Mavericks won its first Summit League Tournament title, and advanced to the NCAA tournament for the first time in men's soccer program history.

Then, in 2022, Caniglia Field was the site of the women's Summit League Championship, where the Omaha women won their first Summit title.

=== Professional Soccer ===
Caniglia Field has also hosted USL League 1 team, Union Omaha on several occasions. On May 8, 2024 Union Omaha played Sporting Kansas City in a US Open Cup round of 32 match. It was the first time an MLS club played a competitive game in Nebraska.

US Open Cup
May 8, 2024
7:00pm
Round of 32

| Union Omaha | 1–2 (a.e.t.) | Sporting Kansas City |
|---|---|---|
| Kunga 31' | Report | Tzionis 48'; Pulido 120' |

Al Caniglia Field, Omaha, NE
Attendance: 4,733
Referee: Nabil Bensalah
