= Durwood Soccer Stadium =

Soccer stadium in Kansas City, Missouri

- Interactive map of Durwood Soccer Stadium
- Full name: Stanley H. Durwood Soccer Stadium
- Address: 5100 Rockhill Road; Kansas, MO; United States
- Coordinates: 39.035729°N 94.579681°W
- Owner: Univ. of Missouri–Kansas City
- Operator: Univ. Missouri–Kansas City Athletics
- Capacity: 850 (expanded to 3,200 for FCKC)
- Type: Soccer-specific stadium
- Surface: Artificial turf (Mondoturf)

Construction
- Groundbreaking: 2008
- Opened: 2009; 17 years ago
- Architect: DLR Group
- Structural engineer: TapanAm Associates
- General contractor: The Weitz Company

Tenants
- Kansas City Roos (NCAA) teams: men's and women's soccer (2009–present); FC Kansas City (NWSL) (2014)

Website
- kcroos.com/durwood-soccer-stadium

Durwood Soccer Stadium is a soccer-specific stadium on the University of Missouri–Kansas City (UMKC) campus that serves as the home of the Kansas City Roos men's and women's soccer teams. It was the home of the National Women's Soccer League's FC Kansas City during the 2014 season. The stadium has a capacity of 850 seats and has a running track around the field.

The stadium opened in 2009, with an official dedication ceremony before a Kangaroos match on October 6, 2009. It is named after Stanley H. Durwood, a longtime benefactor of the university's athletic department, and his foundation contributed $5 million of the $9 million it cost to build the stadium.

UMKC and FC Kansas City reached a two-year deal in January 2014 to play the team's home matches at DSSRF and to expand the seating capacity to 3,200, but after one season, the team moved to Swope Soccer Village.

The stadium also hosted a 2010 U.S. Open Cup match between the Kansas City Wizards (now Sporting Kansas City) and the Colorado Rapids.

The stadium is named after Stanley Durwood (1921–1999), a Kansas-born businessman and philanthropist, inventor of the multiplex, a movie theater complex with multiple screens or auditoriums within a single complex.
