= Omaha Mavericks men's soccer =

American college soccer team

- Founded: 2011
- University: University of Nebraska Omaha
- Head coach: Donovan Dowling (3rd season)
- Conference: Summit
- Location: Omaha, Nebraska, US
- Stadium: Al F. Caniglia Field (capacity: 6,000 - 3,097 Seated)
- Nickname: Mavericks
- Colors: Crimson and black
Home	Away

NCAA tournament Round of 32
- 2020, 2026

NCAA tournament appearances
- 2017, 2020, 2023, 2026

Conference tournament championships
- 2017, 2023, 2026

Conference regular season championships
- 2014, 2016

The Omaha Mavericks men's soccer team represents the University of Nebraska Omaha in NCAA Division I men's soccer competitions. The Mavericks compete in The Summit League.

== History ==
The men's varsity soccer program began ahead of the 2011 NCAA Division I men's soccer season, where Omaha competed as an independent school. Jason Mims was the first coach of the program, who managed the team for first seven seasons of the program's existence. In 2012, Omaha joined the Summit League, where it established itself as one of the top schools in the conference. In the 2016 Summit League Men's Soccer Tournament, Omaha reached the championship, before falling to eventual College Cup finalists, Denver. The following season, the Mavericks reached the final of the 2017 Summit League Men's Soccer Tournament, where they beat Denver in the championship, earning their first ever NCAA Division I Men's Soccer Tournament berth. There, the Mavericks were eliminated in the first round by FIU.

On March 28, 2018, head coach Jason Mims resigned to accept to an administrative position with Major League Soccer club, Real Salt Lake. Mims was replaced by veteran coach, Bob Warming on April 2, 2018. In his third season as coach, the Mavericks returned to the NCAA Division I Men's Soccer Tournament. Omaha finished second in the conference standings but the two games with Denver were canceled due to COVID protocols in the Pioneers camp. If Omaha would have won the two unplayed games, they would have been outright conference champions. COVID protocols kept Denver out of the 2020 NCAA Division I Men's Soccer Tournament and the Mavericks were selected as the replacement team.

== Rivalries ==
The main rival for Omaha is Creighton University, the only other NCAA Division I men's soccer program in Nebraska. The rivalry is known as the "Dodge Street Derby".

=== Dodge Street Derby (Creighton) ===
Creighton victories	Omaha victories	Tie games

No.	Date	Location	Winner	Score
1	September 8, 1979	Plum Creek Park (Note: Match held at Concordia University Nebraska as part of the Concordia Tournament)	Creighton	3–2
2	September 15, 1979	Dodge Park	Creighton	3–1
3	October 11, 1979	Caniglia Field	Omaha	2–1
4	September 6, 1980	Plum Creek Park	Omaha	3–2
5	November 13, 1980	Caniglia Field	Omaha	1–0
6	October 25, 1981	Johnny Rosenblatt Stadium	Creighton	3–0
7	October 23, 1982	Caniglia Field	Creighton	2–0
8	September 5, 2016	Morrison Stadium	Tie	1–1
9	September 26, 2017	Caniglia Field	Creighton	1–0
10	September 16, 2019	Morrison Stadium	Creighton	2–1
11	February 27, 2021	Caniglia Field	Omaha	3–0
12	September 29, 2021	Morrison Stadium	Creighton	1–0
13	September 14, 2022	Caniglia Field	Creighton	6–1
14	October 3, 2023	Morrison Stadium	Tie	2–2
15	October 9, 2024	Caniglia Field	Creighton	2–1
16	September 10, 2025	Morrison Stadium	Creighton	3–2
17	September 29, 2026	Caniglia Field	Creighton	4–2
Series: Creighton leads 11–4–2

Source: Creighton Men's Soccer Record Book

== Seasons ==
Conference champions	Conference Tournament Champions	NCAA Tournament Appearance

Season	Head coach	Conference	Season results							Tournament results	
Season	Head coach	Conference	Overall			Conference				Conference	NCAA
Season	Head coach	Conference	W	L	T	W	L	T	Finish	Conference	NCAA
2011	Jason Mims	Independent	1	11	1	–	–	–	–	Ineligible	Ineligible
2012	Jason Mims	Summit	5	10	1	3	3	1	4th	Ineligible	Ineligible
2013	Jason Mims	Summit	6	9	1	3	3	0	3rd	Ineligible	Ineligible
2014	Jason Mims	Summit	10	5	2	3	2	1	T-1st	Ineligible	Ineligible
2015	Jason Mims	Summit	9	6	3	3	2	1	2nd	Semifinal	—
2016	Jason Mims	Summit	10	5	4	5	0	1	T-1st	Final	—
2017	Jason Mims	Summit	10	6	3	2	1	2	3rd	Champions	First Round
2018	Bob Warming	Summit	7	8	1	4	1	0	2nd	Final	—
2019	Bob Warming	Summit	4	9	4	2	2	1	4th	Final	—
2020	Bob Warming	Summit	7	3	1	5	2	1	2nd*	Not Held	Second Round
2021	Bob Warming	Summit	6	10	1	4	2	0	3rd	Semifinal	—
2022	Donovan Dowling	Summit	8	6	2	5	2	1	3rd	Semifinal	—
2023	Donovan Dowling	Summit	8	8	4	3	3	2	3rd	Champions	First Round
2024	Donovan Dowling	Summit	7	7	3	2	5	1	4th	—	—
2025	Donovan Dowling	Summit	3	9	4	1	3	2	T-4th	—	—

- During the 2020 season, the Summit League men's soccer tournament was not held because of the ongoing COVID-19 pandemic, and the regular season champion would represent the league in the NCAA men's soccer tournament. Omaha finished second in the Summit League standings behind Denver. Omaha's two regular season games with Denver were postponed, and later cancelled due to COVID cases within the Denver program; if Omaha had won those games, they would have been the Summit League regular season champions. On Tuesday, April 20, 2021, Denver announced that they were withdrawing from the NCAA men's soccer tournament "due to COVID-19 protocols," and would be replaced by Omaha. On April 29, 2021, Omaha defeated Denver's intended opponent, 23rd-ranked UNC Greensboro, 3 to 2 for the program's first-ever NCAA men's soccer tournament win.
