= Jamie Franks (soccer) =

American soccer player (born 1986)

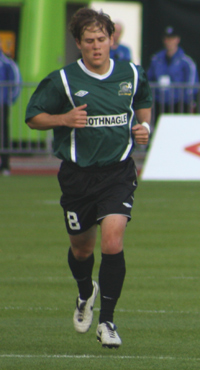

Personal information
- Full name: Jamie Franks
- Date of birth: September 25, 1986 (age 40)
- Place of birth: Medford, New Jersey, United States
- Height: 5 ft 8 in (1.73 m)
- Position: Midfielder

College career
Years	Team	Apps	(Gls)
2005–2008	Wake Forest Demon Deacons		

Senior career*
Years	Team	Apps	(Gls)
2003	Ocean City Barons	2	(3)
2005	Ocean City Barons	4	(0)
2006–2008	Carolina Dynamo	31	(4)
2009	Wilmington Hammerheads	17	(1)
2009	→ Charleston Battery (loan)	2	(0)
2010	Rochester Rhinos	25	(0)

Managerial career
- 2011: Wake Forest Demon Deacons (assistant)
- 2012–2015: Denver Pioneers (assistant)
- 2015–: Denver Pioneers
- * Club domestic league appearances and goals as of October 2, 2010

Jamie Franks (born September 25, 1986, in Medford, New Jersey) is an American soccer player who last played for Rochester Rhinos in the USSF Division 2 Professional League. He is currently the head coach for the University of Denver. Franks is one of four brothers; Ryan, Brad, and Kyle.

== Career ==
=== Youth and college ===
Franks attended Shawnee High School, where he was the 2004 New Jersey High School Player of the Year, a NSCAA/adidas High School All-American and a two-time NSCAA/adidas Youth All-American, and played club soccer for Medford Speed and the PDA Conquistadors.

He played college soccer at Wake Forest University from 2005 to 2008, appearing in 93 games for them in this period. In his senior year he had 3 goals and 11 assists. He compiled 7 goals and 20 assists over his four years, appeared in three college cups and won the 2007 national championship.

During his college years Franks also played for both the Ocean City Barons in 2005 and Carolina Dynamo in the USL Premier Development League. In 2003, as a member of the Barons, Franks became the youngest player in club history to score a goal at 16 years and 262 days old. On June 14, 2003, Franks scored a goal in a 5–2 home win over the Worcester Kings in the 79th minute.

=== Professional ===
Franks was drafted in the fourth round (49th overall) of the 2009 MLS SuperDraft by Chivas USA, but was not offered a contract by the club, and eventually signed with the Wilmington Hammerheads of the USL Second Division. He made his professional debut on April 25, 2009, in Wilmington's 2–2 opening day tie with the Charlotte Eagles.

He moved to USSF Division 2 club Rochester Rhinos in March 2010.

Franks joined the coaching staff at his alma mater, Wake Forest, in March 2011.

=== Coaching ===
It was announced on March 21, 2012, that Franks would be leaving Wake Forest to become an assistant coach at the University of Denver.

On January 30, 2015, it was announced that Franks was the new head coach of the Denver Pioneers men's soccer team.

After a successful 2016 season which saw the Pioneers reach their first ever College Cup, Franks won the NSCAA College Coach of the Year. The Pioneers finished third in the final NSCAA rankings and posted a 20–1–3 record.

=== International ===
While in college Franks played for the United States Under-18 national team.

== Honors ==
=== Player ===
Rochester Rhinos

- USSF Division 2 Pro League Regular Season Champions: 2010

Wilmington Hammerheads

- USL Second Division Regular Season Champions: 2009

Wake Forest University

- NCAA Men's Division I Soccer Championship: 2007

=== Coach ===
- NSCAA College Coach of the Year: 2016
- 5× 'Summit League Coach of the Year 2015–18, 2023
