= Oral Roberts Golden Eagles men's soccer =

American college soccer team

- Founded: 1988; 38 years ago
- University: Oral Roberts University
- Head coach: Ryan Bush (7th season)
- Conference: Summit
- Location: Tulsa, Oklahoma, US
- Stadium: Case Soccer Complex (capacity: 1,000)
- Nickname: Golden Eagles, ORU
- Colors: Navy blue, Vegas gold, and white
Home	Away

Conference regular season championships
- 2001, 2004, 2014, 2019

The Oral Roberts Golden Eagles men's soccer team represents Oral Roberts University in NCAA Division I men's college soccer competitions. The Eagles compete in The Summit League.

== Rivalries ==
Historically, Oral Roberts' biggest rivals have been Kansas City and Tulsa due to the geographic proximity of the two schools.

=== Tulsa derby ===
Oral Roberts' crosstown rivalry is with the Tulsa Golden Hurricane men's soccer program. Tulsa leads the series 21–4–2.

Oral Roberts victories	Tulsa victories	Tie games

No.	Date	Location	Winning team		Losing team	
1	September 6, 1988	Tulsa	Tulsa	2	Oral Roberts	0
2	October 26, 1988	Tulsa	Tulsa	7	Oral Roberts	1
3	October 14, 1990	Tulsa	Tulsa	2	Oral Roberts	1
4	October 26, 1991	Tulsa	Tulsa	5	Oral Roberts	2
5	October 16, 1992	Tulsa	Tulsa	4	Oral Roberts	2
6	September 9, 1994	Tulsa	Oral Roberts	1	Tulsa	0
7	October 25, 1994	Tulsa	Tulsa	2	Oral Roberts	1
8	September 13, 1996	Tulsa	Tulsa	4	Oral Roberts	1
9	September 25, 1997	Tulsa	Tulsa	3	Oral Roberts	0
10	October 4, 1998	Tulsa	Tulsa	5	Oral Roberts	0
11	September 21, 2000	Tulsa	Tulsa	7	Oral Roberts	3
12	September 18, 2001	Tulsa	Tulsa	2	Oral Roberts	1
13	September 20, 2002	Tulsa	Tulsa	2	Oral Roberts	1
14	September 13, 2003	University Park	Tulsa	2	Oral Roberts	1

No.	Date	Location	Winning team		Losing team	
15	September 17, 2004	Tulsa	Tulsa	3	Oral Roberts	0
16	September 1, 2005	Tulsa	Oral Roberts	3	Tulsa	1
17	October 17, 2006	Tulsa	Tulsa	4	Oral Roberts	2
18	October 20, 2008	Tulsa	Tulsa	4	Oral Roberts	0
19	September 16, 2014	Tulsa	Tulsa	4	Oral Roberts	1
20	September 10, 2015	Tulsa	Tulsa	6	Oral Roberts	2
21	October 18, 2016	Tulsa	Tie	3	Tie	3
22	October 23, 2018	Tulsa	Tulsa	5	Oral Roberts	1
23	October 8, 2019	Tulsa	Tulsa	3	Oral Roberts	2
24	September 5, 2022	Tulsa	Tulsa	4	Oral Roberts	0
25	September 1, 2023	Tulsa	Oral Roberts	1	Tulsa	0
26	September 10, 2024	Tulsa	Tie	2	Tie	2
27	October 7, 2025	Tulsa	Oral Roberts	1	Tulsa	0
Series: Tulsa leads 21–4–2
