= Denver Pioneers men's soccer =

American college soccer team

- University: University of Denver
- Head coach: Jamie Franks (10th season)
- Conference: WCC
- Location: Denver, Colorado, US
- Stadium: Denver Soccer Stadium (capacity: 1,950)
- Nickname: Pioneers
- Colors: Crimson and gold
Home	Away

NCAA tournament College Cup
- 2016, 2024

NCAA tournament Quarterfinals
- 1970, 2016, 2024

NCAA tournament Round of 16
- 1970, 2015, 2016, 2024

NCAA tournament Round of 32
- 1970, 2015, 2016, 2018, 2021, 2022, 2023, 2024, 2025

NCAA tournament appearances
- 1970, 2008, 2010, 2013, 2014, 2015, 2016, 2018, 2019, 2020, 2021, 2022, 2023, 2024, 2025

Conference tournament championships
- 2013, 2014, 2015, 2016, 2018, 2019, 2021, 2022, 2025

Conference regular season championships
- 2008, 2010, 2013, 2014, 2015, 2016, 2017, 2018, 2020, 2021, 2023, 2024, 2025

The Denver Pioneers men's soccer team represents the University of Denver (DU) in NCAA Division I men's soccer competitions. As of the upcoming 2026 season, the Pioneers compete in the West Coast Conference (WCC) after having played in the Summit League since 2013.

== Team management ==
=== Head coaching history ===
Over the program's history, there have been 11 different head coaches.

Name	Nat.	Tenure	Honors
Edgar Laipenieks	USA	1961	
Willy Schaeffler	GER	1962–1969	
Peder Pytte	NOR	1970–1973	First NCAA Tournament berth
John Byrden	USA	1974–1988	First NAIA Tournament berth
Albert Adetoye	USA	1989–1991	
Dave Clements	IRE	1991–1994	
Chad Ashton	USA	1995	
Jeff Hooker	USA	1996–1997	
Chad Ashton	USA	1998–2006	
Bobby Muuss	USA	2007–2014	2013 Summit League Tournament; 2014 Summit League Tournament
Jamie Franks	USA	2015–present	2015 Summit League Tournament; 2016 Summit League Tournament; 2016 NCAA College Cup; 2018 Summit League Tournament; 2019 Summit League Tournament; 2021 Summit League Tournament; 2022 Summit League Tournament; 2025 Summit League Tournament

== Seasons ==
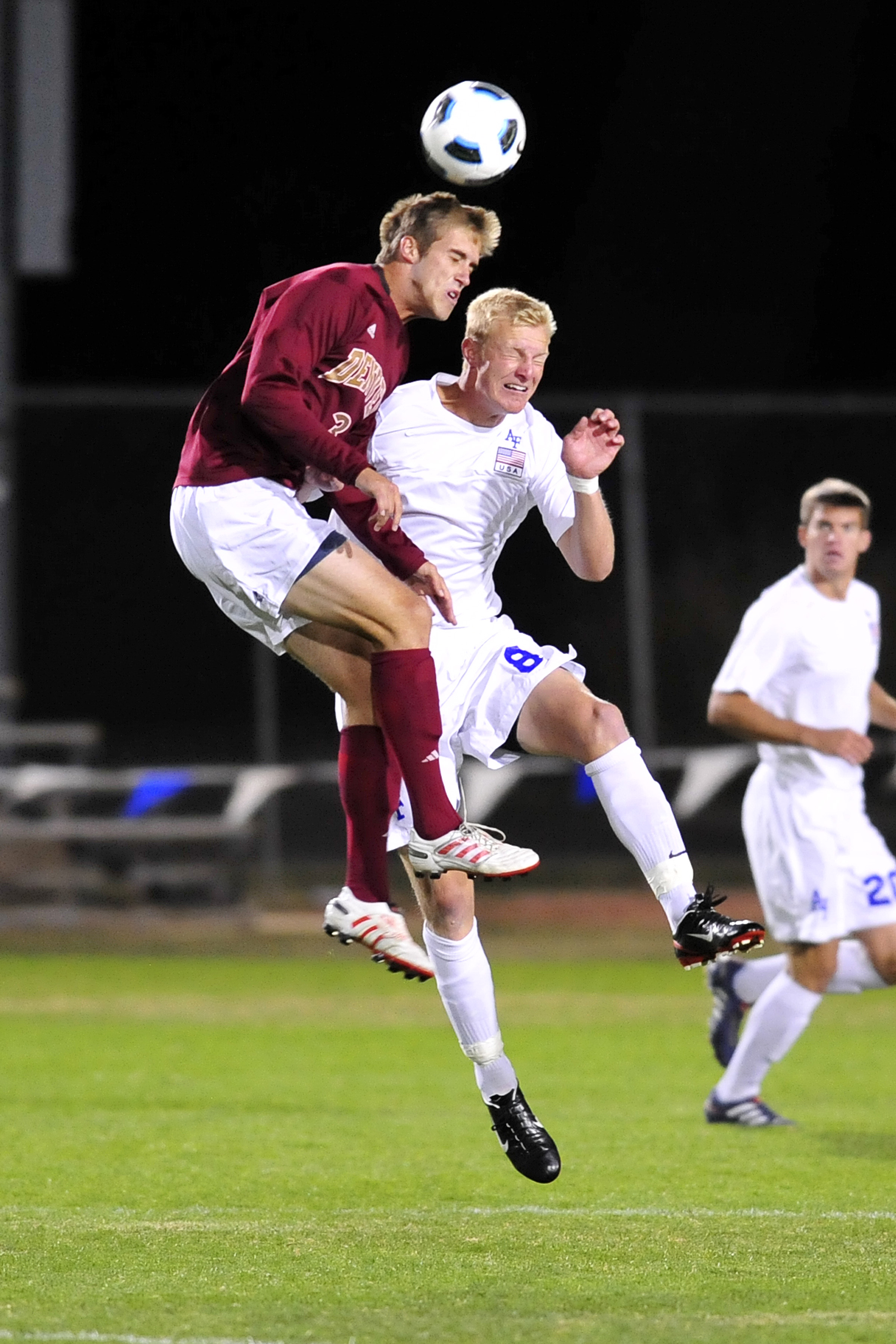
A game between Denver and Air Force in 2010

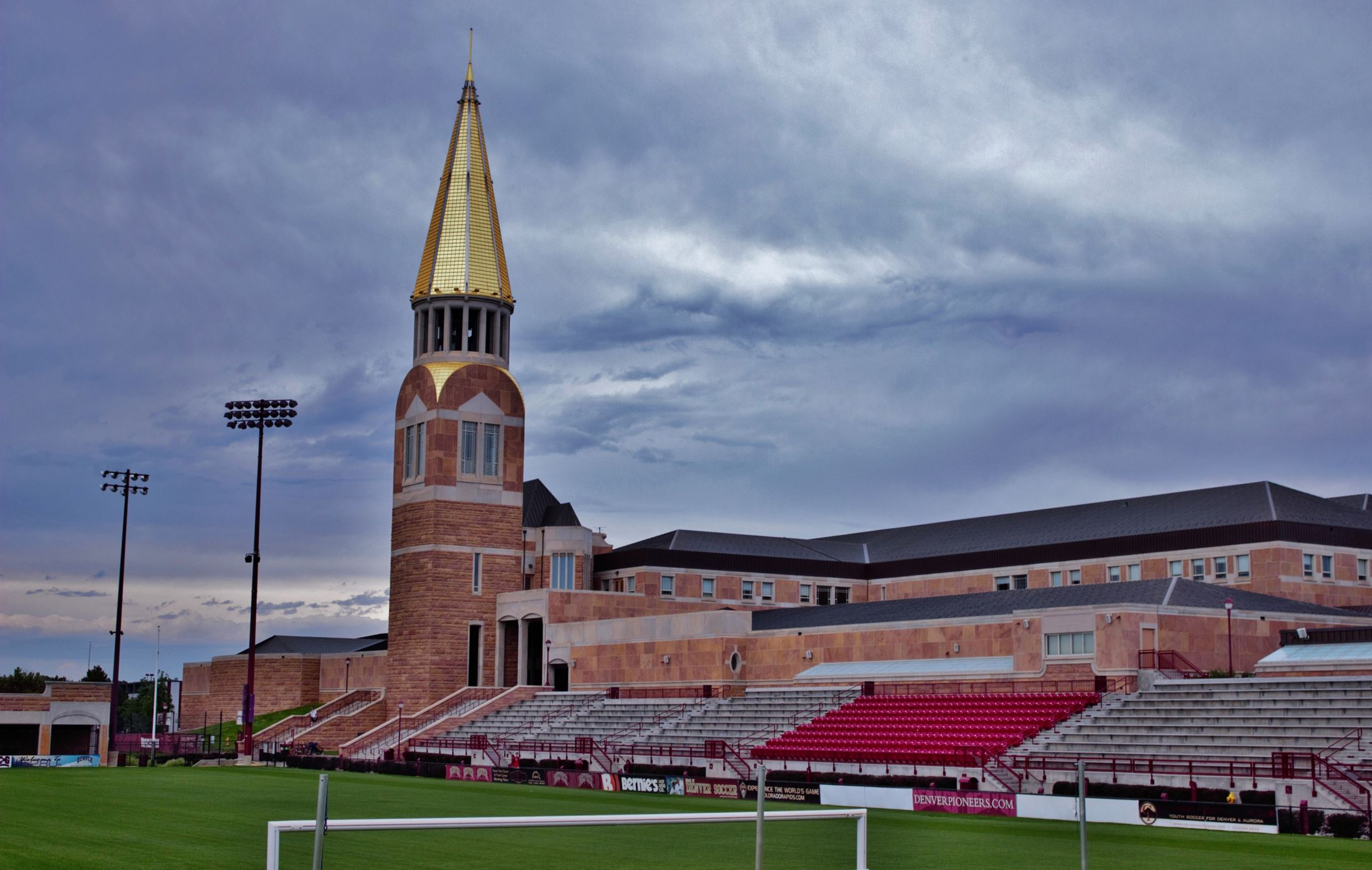
Exterior of the Daniel L. Ritchie Center

National champions

Conference champions Division champions

NCAA/NAIA tournament berth

Season	Head coach	Conference	Season results							Tournament results	
Season	Head coach	Conference	Overall			Conference				Conference	NCAA / NAIA
Season	Head coach	Conference	W	L	T	W	L	T	Finish	Conference	NCAA / NAIA
1961	Edgar Laipenieks	Independent	7	3	0	—	—	—	—	—	—
1962	Willy Schaeffler	Independent	5	2	0	—	—	—	—	—	—
1963	Willy Schaeffler	Independent	5	2	1	—	—	—	—	—	—
1964	Willy Schaeffler	Independent	8	0	0	—	—	—	—	—	—
1965	Willy Schaeffler	Independent	7	0	0	—	—	—	—	—	—
1966	Willy Schaeffler	Independent	8	0	0	—	—	—	—	—	—
1967	Willy Schaeffler	Independent	8	2	0	—	—	—	—	—	—
1968	Willy Schaeffler	Independent	8	3	0	—	—	—	—	—	—
1969	Willy Schaeffler	Independent	6	1	0	—	—	—	—	—	—
1970^	Peder Pytte	Independent	11	2	0	—	—	—	—	—	NCAA Quarterfinal^
1971	Peder Pytte	Independent	5	2	2	—	—	—	—	—	—
1972	Peder Pytte	Independent	6	2	1	—	—	—	—	—	—
1973	Peder Pytte	Independent	2	11	1	—	—	—	—	—	—
1974	John Byrden	Independent	4	8	1	—	—	—	—	—	—
1975	John Byrden	Independent	4	6	0	—	—	—	—	—	—
1976	John Byrden	Independent	8	5	2	—	—	—	—	—	—
1977	John Byrden	Independent	7	7	0	—	—	—	—	—	—
1978^	John Byrden	Independent	14	3	1	—	—	—	—	—	NAIA Regionals^
1979^	John Byrden	Independent	11	9	0	—	—	—	—	—	NAIA Regionals^
1980	John Byrden	Independent	9	6	2	—	—	—	—	—	—
1981	John Byrden	Independent	13	6	2	—	—	—	—	—	—
1982^	John Byrden	Independent	18	3	0	—	—	—	—	—	NAIA Regionals^
1998	Chad Ashton	Independent	3	13	1	—	—	—	—	—	—
1999	Chad Ashton	MPSF	8	11	0	4	2	0	3rd (Mountain)	—	—
2000	Chad Ashton	MPSF	9	6	2	6	2	1	2nd (Mountain)	Semifinals	—
2001	Chad Ashton	MPSF	10	6	3	4	3	0	3rd	First Round	—
2002	Chad Ashton	MPSF	9	12	0	2	4	0	5th	Semifinals	—
2003	Chad Ashton	MPSF	7	9	2	1	4	1	7th	—	—
2004	Chad Ashton	MPSF	12	5	1	9	3	0	2nd	—	—
2005	Chad Ashton	MPSF	7	10	1	3	7	0	5th	—	—
2006	Chad Ashton	MPSF	11	5	2	7	2	1	2nd	—	—
2007	Bobby Muuss	MPSF	10	4	4	6	1	3	2nd	—	—
2008^	Bobby Muuss	MPSF	10	7	2	8	1	1	1st*	—	NCAA First Round^
2009	Bobby Muuss	MPSF	5	10	4	2	4	1	7th	Semifinals	—
2010^	Bobby Muuss	MPSF	9	7	4	6	2	2	1st*	Semifinals	NCAA First Round^
2011	Bobby Muuss	MPSF	5	11	3	3	6	1	6th	Quarterfinals	—
2012	Bobby Muuss	MPSF	11	6	3	5	4	1	3rd	Semifinals	—
2013^	Bobby Muuss	Summit	13	3	4	6	0	0	1st*	Champions*	NCAA First Round^
2014^	Bobby Muuss	Summit	11	8	1	3	2	1	1st*	Champions*	NCAA First Round^
2015^	Jamie Franks	Summit	15	1	3	5	0	1	1st*	Champions*	NCAA Second Round^
2016^	Jamie Franks	Summit	20	1	3	5	0	1	T-1st*	Champions*	NCAA Semifinals^
2017*	Jamie Franks	Summit	11	6	2	5	0	0	1st*	Runners-up	—
2018^	Jamie Franks	Summit	15	5	4	4	0	1	1st*	Champions*	NCAA Second Round^
2019^	Jamie Franks	Summit	6	12	3	2	2	1	T-3rd	Champions*	NCAA First Round^
2020*	Jamie Franks	Summit	6	2	0	6	2	0	1st*	—	—
2021^	Jamie Franks	Summit	10	4	5	4	1	1	T-1st*	Champions*	NCAA Second Round^
2022^	Jamie Franks	Summit	14	3	5	6	0	2	2nd	Champions*	NCAA Second Round^
2023^	Jamie Franks	Summit	12	3	5	7	0	1	1st*	Semifinals	NCAA Second Round^
2024^	Jamie Franks	Summit	15	3	5	7	1	0	1st*	Runners-up	NCAA Semifinals^
2025^	Jamie Franks	Summit	12	7	3	4	1	1	T-1st*	Champions*	NCAA Second Round^
