= Concordia Teachers College =

Concordia Teachers College is the former name of two universities in the United States:

- Concordia University Nebraska in Seward, Nebraska
- Concordia University Chicago in River Forest, Illinois
