= Grand Canyon Antelopes =

Collegiate sports club in Arizona, US

- University: Grand Canyon University
- Nickname: Antelopes
- NCAA: Division I
- Conference: Mountain West (primary); Mountain Pacific Sports Federation (beach volleyball)
- Athletic director: Jamie Boggs
- Location: Phoenix, Arizona
- Varsity teams: 20 (9 men's, 11 women's)
- Basketball arena: Global Credit Union Arena
- Baseball stadium: Brazell Field at GCU Ballpark
- Softball stadium: GCU Softball Stadium
- Soccer stadium: GCU Stadium
- Other venues: Antelope Gymnasium
- Colors: Purple, black, and white
- Mascot: Thunder the Antelope
- Website: gculopes.com
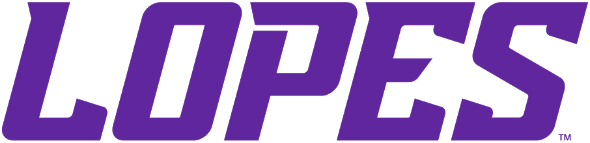

The Grand Canyon Antelopes (more commonly referred to as the Lopes) are the 20 athletic teams representing Grand Canyon University, located in Phoenix, Arizona. Most of the university's athletic teams compete at the NCAA Division I level as a member of the Mountain West Conference.

Beach volleyball competes in the Mountain Pacific Sports Federation (MPSF) having joined in 2024–25, the first season for MPSF beach volleyball.

== History ==
Grand Canyon College was founded in 1949. The Antelopes began play during the college's first academic year, initially only with a men's basketball team due to the school's small size.

GCU was a member of the NAIA until the early 1990s when it transferred to NCAA Division II, in which it competed until 2013.

The university has undergone a transition from a small non-profit liberal arts college to a large modern for-profit private university. Along with the general campus upgrades has come an increase in athletics and athletic facilities.

On November 27, 2012, Grand Canyon University announced that it had accepted an invitation to join Division I's Western Athletic Conference, effective July 1, 2013. This move made Grand Canyon the only for-profit institution with a Division I athletic program.

Pac-12 Conference officials initially took issue with GCU's business model before eventually reversing course. In July 2013, the chief executives of all 12 members of the sent a joint letter to the NCAA asking that the organization review whether for-profit institutions have a place in Division I sports. Later that year, Arizona State University issued a separate statement questioning the school's allegiance to the NCAA's business model. GCU president Brian Mueller accused ASU president Michael Crow of being behind the Pac-12 letter. Crow would later double down on his accusations, falsely claiming in 2017 that 11 of the 12 Pac-12 schools would not play GCU because of its for-profit business model, and also asserting that GCU sought to play Pac-12 schools solely for exposure on the Pac-12 Network.

Western Athletic Conference logo in Grand Canyon's colors

Counter to Crow's 2017 assertion, 10 Pac-12 members had scheduled GCU in at least one sport since the Antelopes' move to Division I, although only Arizona and Utah had faced GCU in men's basketball. The controversy quickly dissipated, as Arizona State and Grand Canyon routinely compete athletically including in men's basketball, women's basketball, baseball and softball.

The university announced a five-year sponsorship deal with Nike on May 27, 2015, as a part of Grand Canyon's athletic expansion.

On August 23, 2017, the NCAA officially approved Grand Canyon's move to Division I, elevating the university to active membership status. GCU immediately became eligible for postseason competition. The women's golf program became the first team to represent the school in NCAA DI postseason in 2018.

GCU quickly thrived in the WAC, winning six straight Commissioner's Cups for fully completed school years as the conference's top-performing athletics department.

The university announced on May 10, 2024 that it would become a full member of the West Coast Conference on July 1, 2025. On November 1, the university announced that it would instead join the Mountain West Conference no later than July 1, 2026.

On July 1, 2025, GCU officially withdrew from the WAC. On July 8, 2025 the Mountain West announced Grand Canyon would join the conference for the 2025-26 school year. This made GCU the second non-football institution to be a full member of a Division I FBS conference, the other being American Conference member Wichita State.

== Sports ==
Grand Canyon University sponsors teams in 9 men's and 11 women's NCAA sanctioned sports:

Men's sports	Women's sports
Baseball	Softball
Basketball	Basketball
Cross country	Cross country
Golf	Golf
Soccer	Soccer
Swimming and diving	Swimming and diving
Tennis	Tennis
Track and field^{1}	Track and field^{1}
	Beach volleyball
	Volleyball
^{1} – includes both indoor and outdoor.

=== Baseball ===
GCU Baseball has won four NAIA Baseball World Series in 1980, 1981, 1982, and 1986. A number of Alumni have gone on to Major League Baseball careers. The program advanced to its first NCAA tournament in 2021 after winning the WAC baseball tournament and followed it up in 2022 with its first at-large bid.

=== Men's basketball ===
Men's basketball is coached by Bryce Drew of NCAA tournament lore. GCU won three NAIA Men's Basketball Championships at the NAIA Division I level in 1975, 1978, and 1988, the 2007 PacWest Conference Championship and a berth in the 2007 NCAA Division II men's basketball tournament. GCU has seen two Lopes basketball alumni go on to careers in the NBA, including: Horacio Llamas, the first Mexican-born player to play in an NBA game.; and Bayard Forrest, former basketball player with the Seattle SuperSonics and Phoenix Suns. Croatian national team player Emilio Kovačić played his first university basketball seasons in Grand Canyon, before leaving to Arizona State. In 2021, the Lopes won their first WAC championship and made their first NCAA appearance. In 2024, making their third NCAA tournament appearance in four years, the Lopes claimed their first tournament win by upsetting Saint Mary's.

=== Women's basketball ===
Women's basketball won the 2007 PacWest Conference Championship and a berth in the 2007 NCAA Women's Division II Basketball tournament.

=== Men's golf ===
Men's golf is coached by Mark Mueller whose father is GCU president Brian Mueller.

=== Men's soccer ===
Men's soccer won the 1996 NCAA Men's Division II Soccer Championship with a 3–1 win over Oakland University. The program qualified for its first NCAA Division I tournament in 2018 after winning the WAC tournament as the No. 4 seed. The program also qualified in 2020 and 2021 with at-large berths.

=== Softball ===
Softball was added in 2004 and in 2010 the team made its first NCAA tournament appearance in 2010. 2010 also saw the Lopes set a new program record for most wins in a season going 42–11. Under first-year head coach Shanon Hays, the program qualified for its first NCAA Division I tournament in 2022 after winning the WAC Tournament.

=== Women's tennis ===
Women's tennis won the 1981 NAIA national women's tennis championship.

=== Men's track and field ===
Men's track team won the 2012 NCAA Division II men's Indoor Track and Field Championship scoring 54 points.

=== Sports sponsorship timeline ===
Current sports Former sports

== Past sports ==
=== Men's lacrosse ===
Men's lacrosse made a brief appearance as an NCAA sport from 2008 to 2011. The team played its first game on February 10, 2008, an 18–8 loss to Arizona (MCLA DI). In 2010, GCU and other NCAA DII lacrosse programs in the Southwest formed the Western Intercollegiate Lacrosse Association. In the Lopes' only season as a member of the WILA, the team recorded a 3–5 conference record. After a number of below .500 seasons combined with increasing travel costs due to lack of NCAA DII competition in the region, the university announced in March 2011 it would end Division II lacrosse competition.

=== Men's wrestling ===
In March 2016, the school announced that it would discontinue its men's wrestling program. The program went 6–32 in the 2014–15 and 2015–16 seasons and competed independent of a conference.

=== Men's volleyball ===
GCU discontinued varsity men's volleyball in April 2025, downgrading that team to club status.

== Club sports ==
The university has a large club sports offering with programs not affiliated with the NCAA. With over 30 programs offered, GCU's club sports teams have their own coaching staff and athletic trainers. The teams sometimes travel for competition.

=== Men's lacrosse ===
After discontinuing its NCAA men's lacrosse program, GCU joined the Men's Collegiate Lacrosse Association. The program joined the Southwestern Lacrosse Conference (SLC) and plays in the MCLA Division I level in the SLC's Pacific Division. In 2015 and 2017, GCU won the MCLA Division 1 National Championship.

=== Rugby ===
Men's rugby was added as a club sport in 2013. The team began competing in the 2014–2015 academic year.

=== Ice Hockey ===
Men's ice hockey began as a club sport in 2016 at the ACHA DII and DIII levels until 2019 when the program was accepted at the DI level. Women's ice hockey began in 2017 and is a member of the WWCHL and competes in DI of the ACHA.

== Athletic facilities ==
Grand Canyon University has several athletic facilities where its 21 NCAA athletic programs host home games.

Venue	Sport	Opened	Capac.
Global Credit Union Arena	Basketball; Volleyball	2011	7,000
Brazell Field at GCU Ballpark	Baseball	2018	4,000
GCU Softball Stadium	Softball	2018	1,200
GCU Stadium	Soccer	2016	6,000
Antelope Gymnasium	Volleyball (Note: Serves as secondary venue for indoor sports.)	1994	1,500
Prescott Field	Lacrosse	n/a	n/a
GCU Golf Course	Golf	n/a	n/a
GCU Beach Volleyball Stadium	Beach volleyball	2017	1,000
GCU Tennis Facility (Note: Consists of 6 courts.)	Tennis	2016	n/a

=== Gallery ===
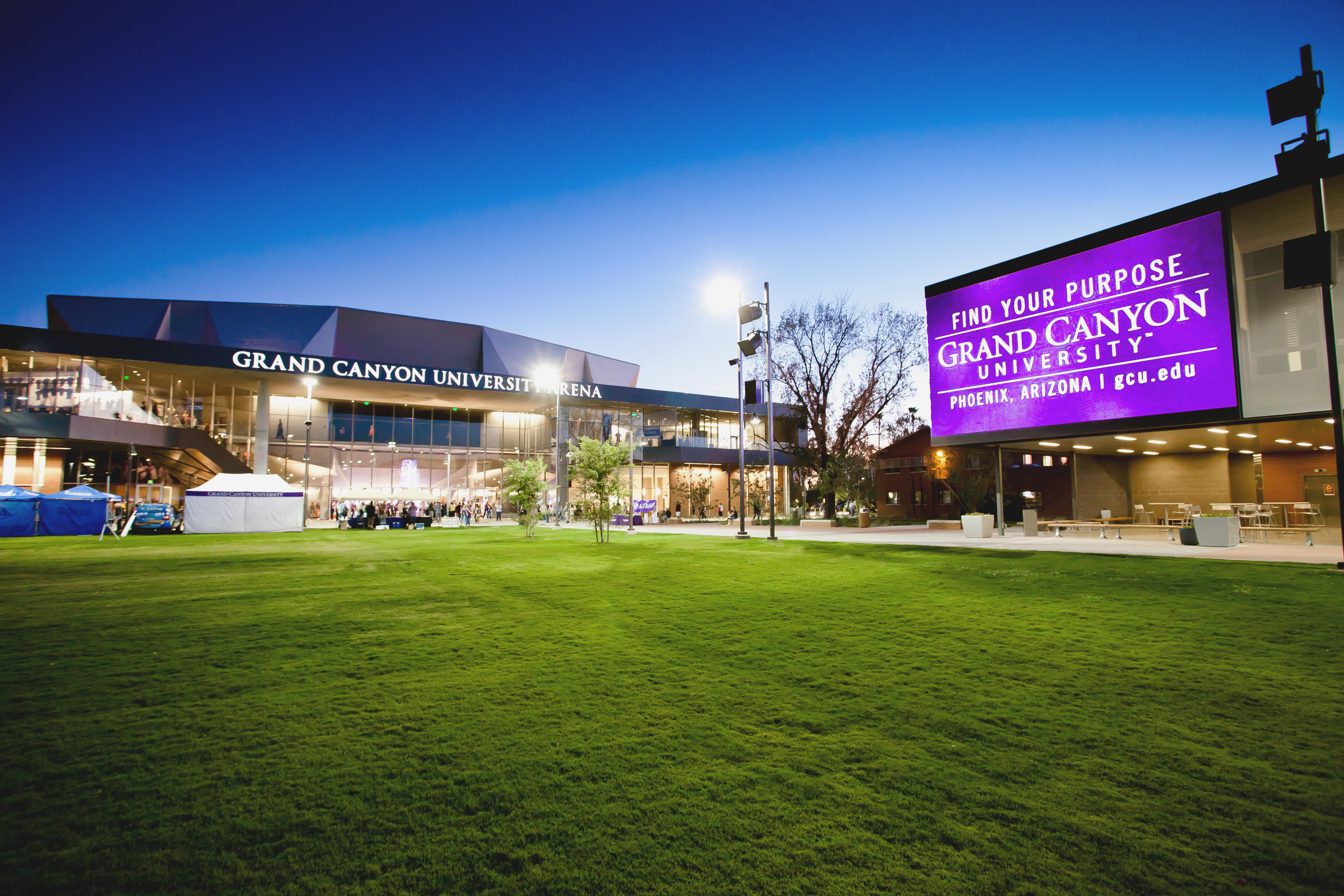
Global Credit Union Arena

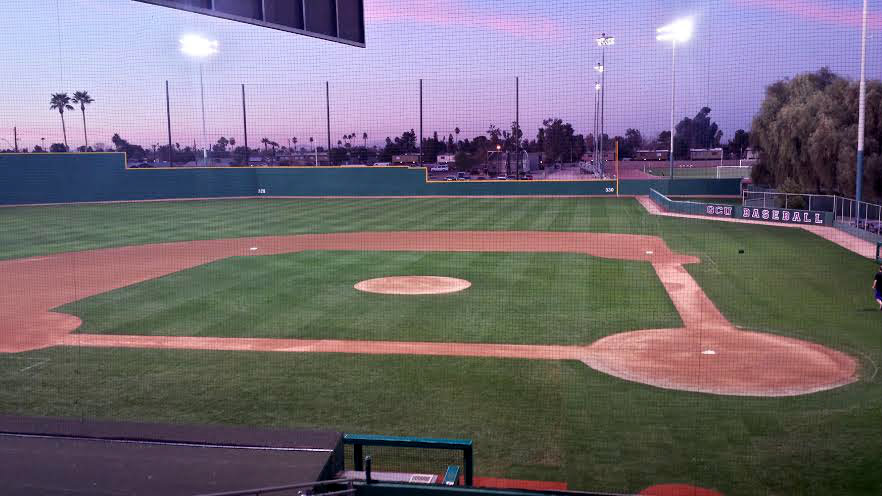
Brazell Field at GCU Ballpark

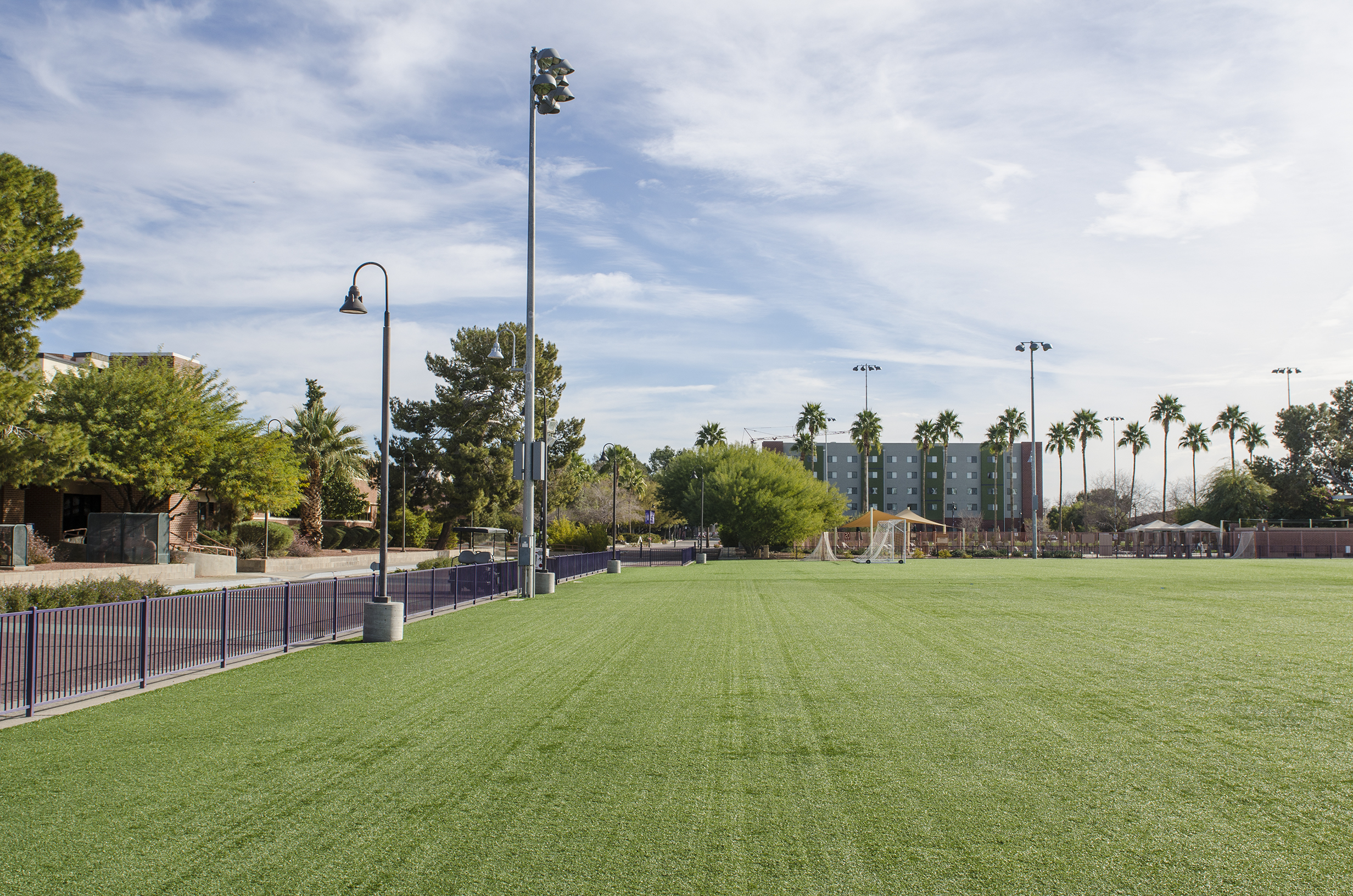
GCU Stadium

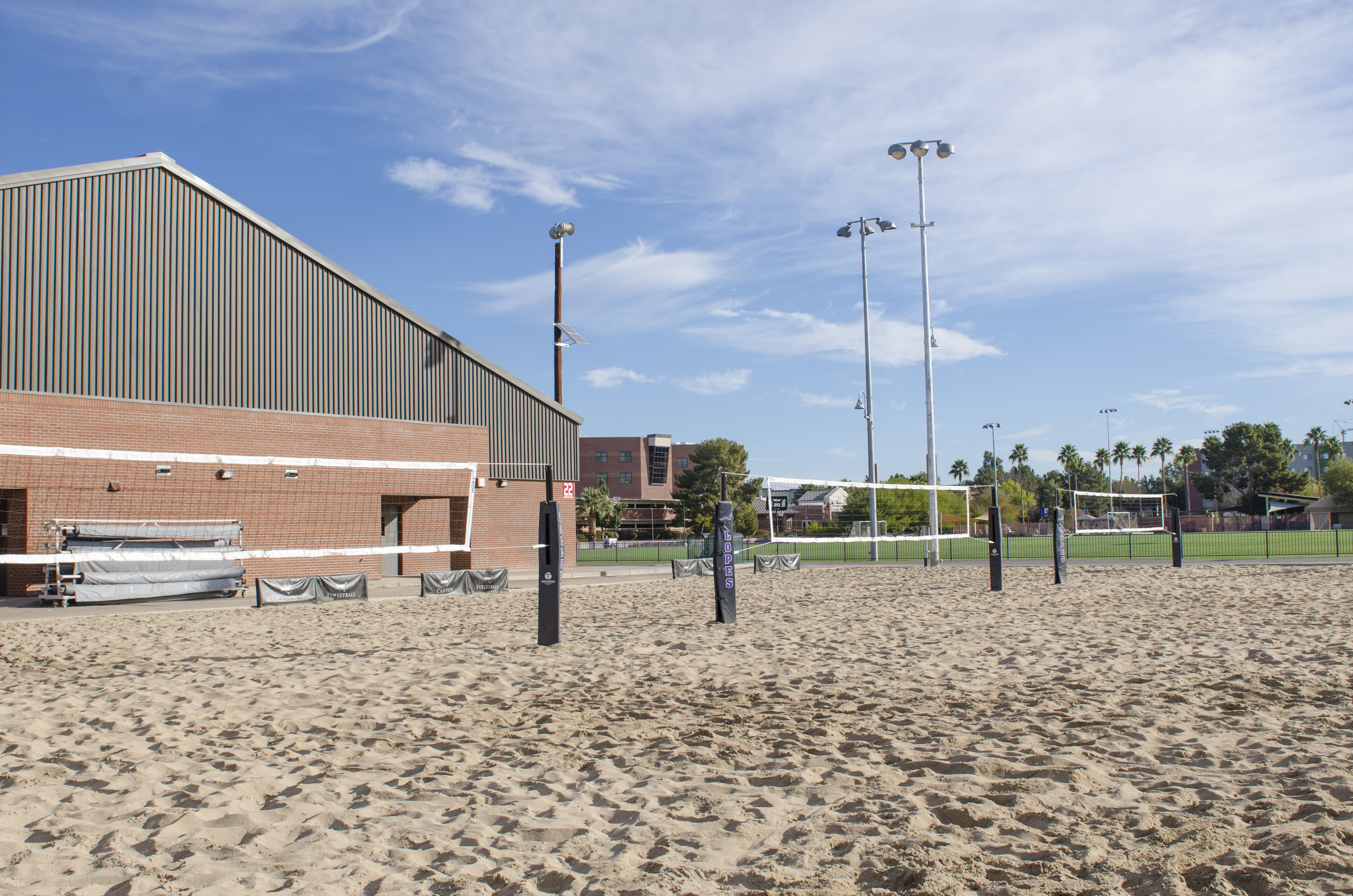
Beach volleyball

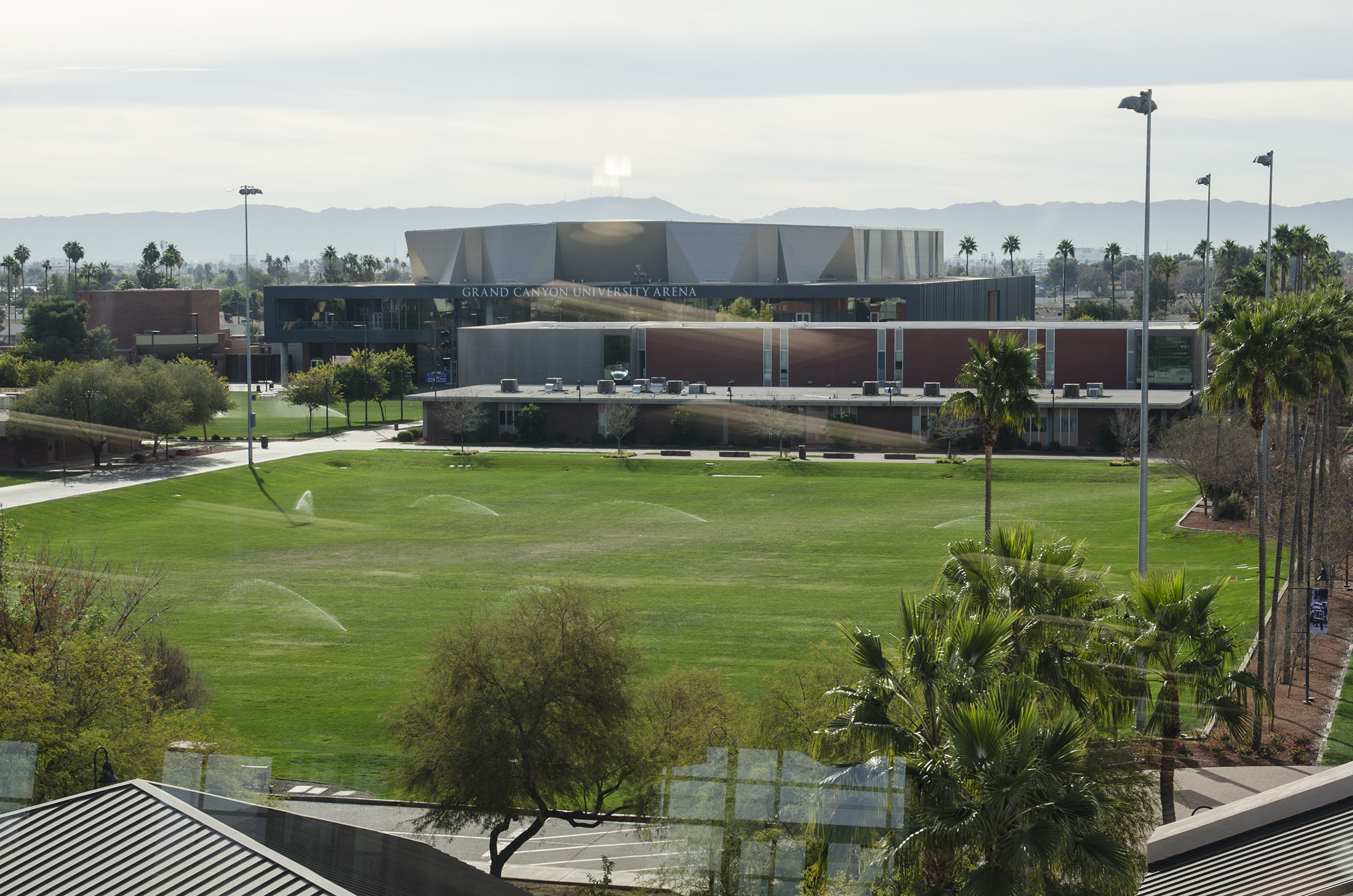
Prescott Field

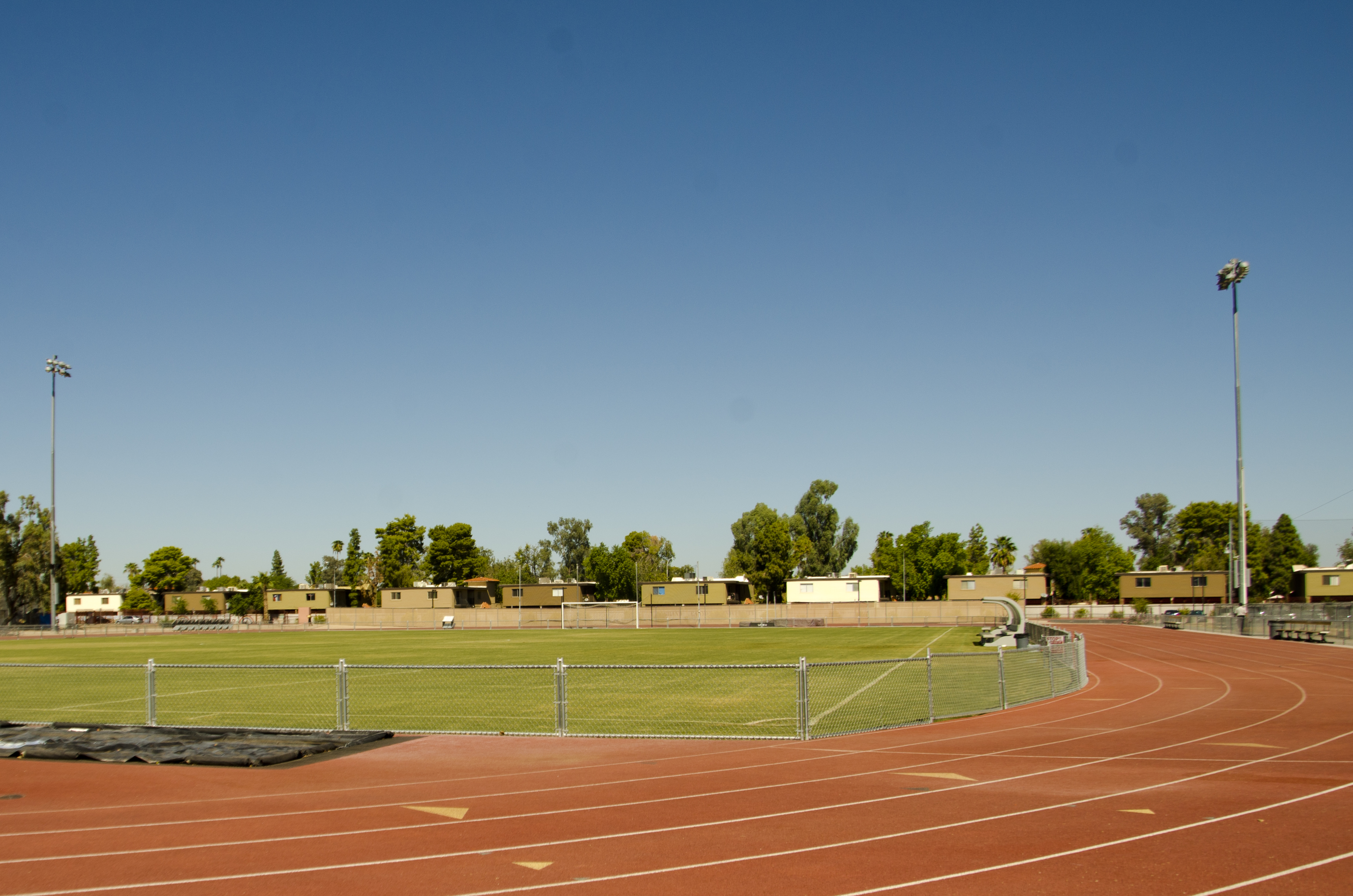
Track and practice soccer

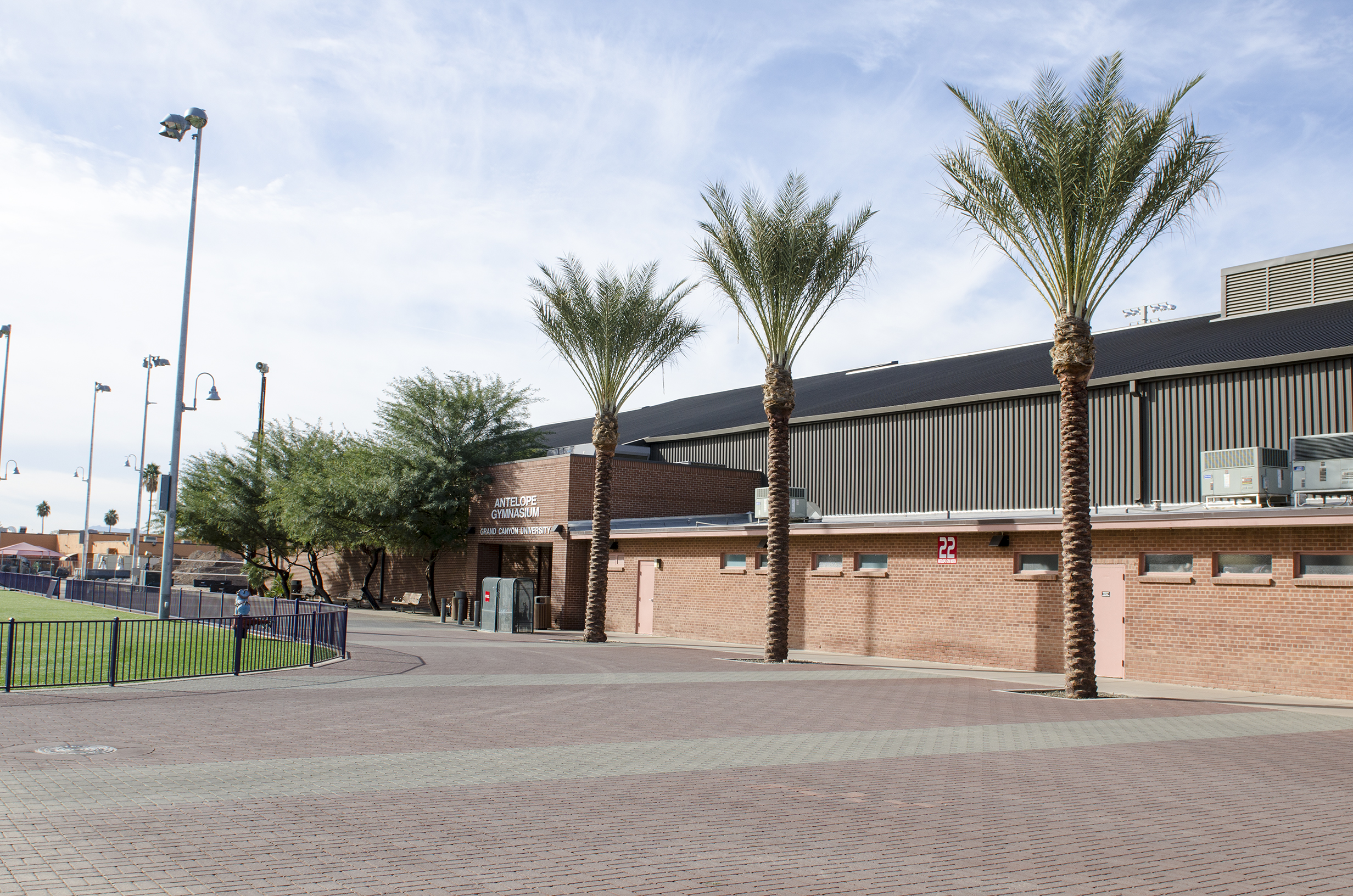
Antelope Gymnasium

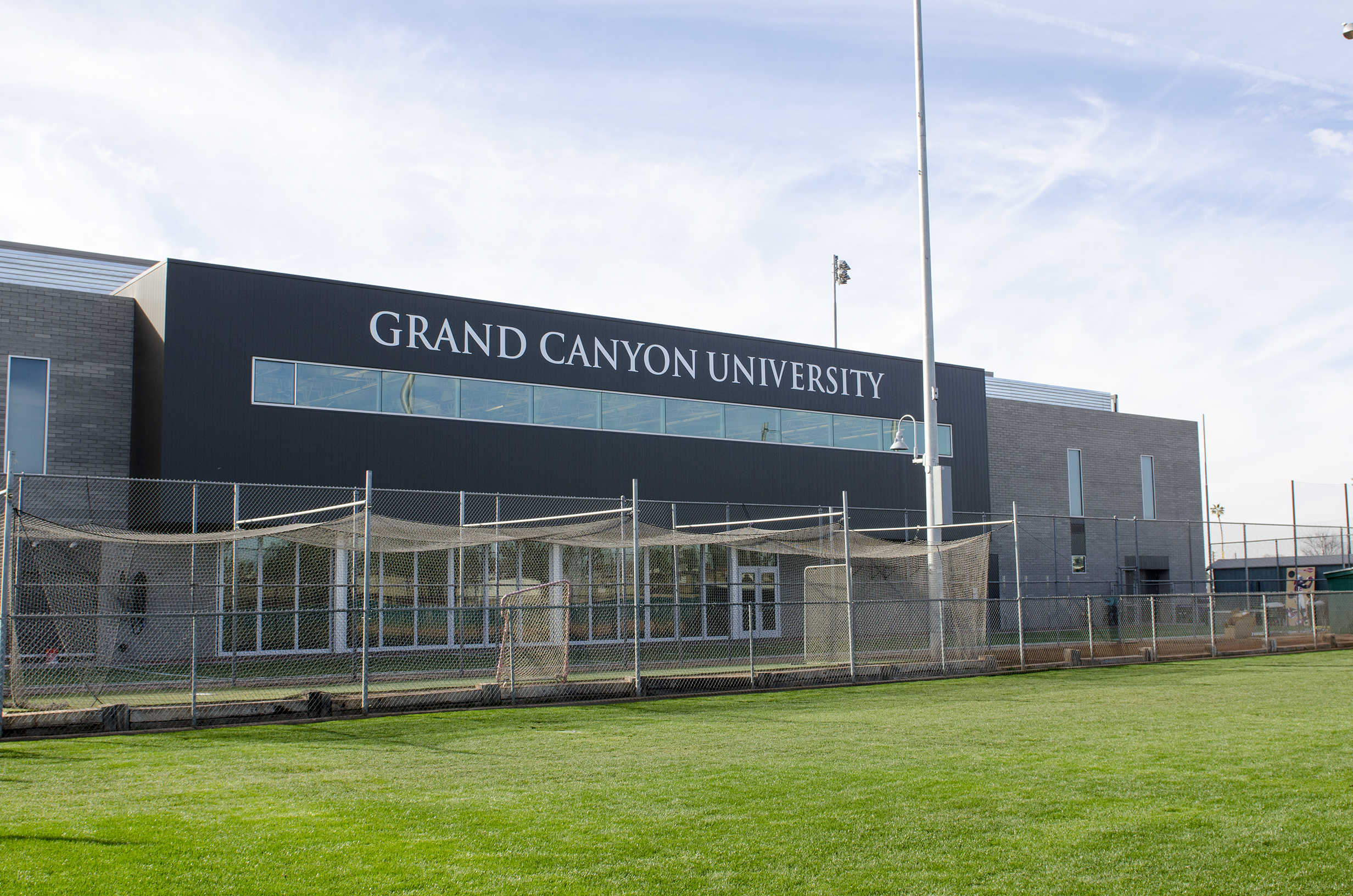
Performance Center

== Athletic directors ==
- David Brazell (1962–1979)*
- Bill Estes (1979–1982)
- Gil Stafford (1982–1994)
- Keith Baker (1994–2002)
- John Pierson (2002–2004)
- Keith Baker (2004–2014)
- Mike Vaught (2014–2019)
- Jamie Boggs (2019–present)

*Brazell began working at the school as a coach and professor in 1953, but was first referred to as athletic director in 1962.
