= Tony Harper =

Tony Harper may refer to:

- Tony Harper (footballer) (1925–1982), English footballer
- Tony Harper (athlete) (1938–2013), Bermudian sprinter
- Tony Harper (American football), American football coach

== See also ==
- Toni Harper (born 1937), former child singer
