= Kenlon Johannes =

American biofuel advocate

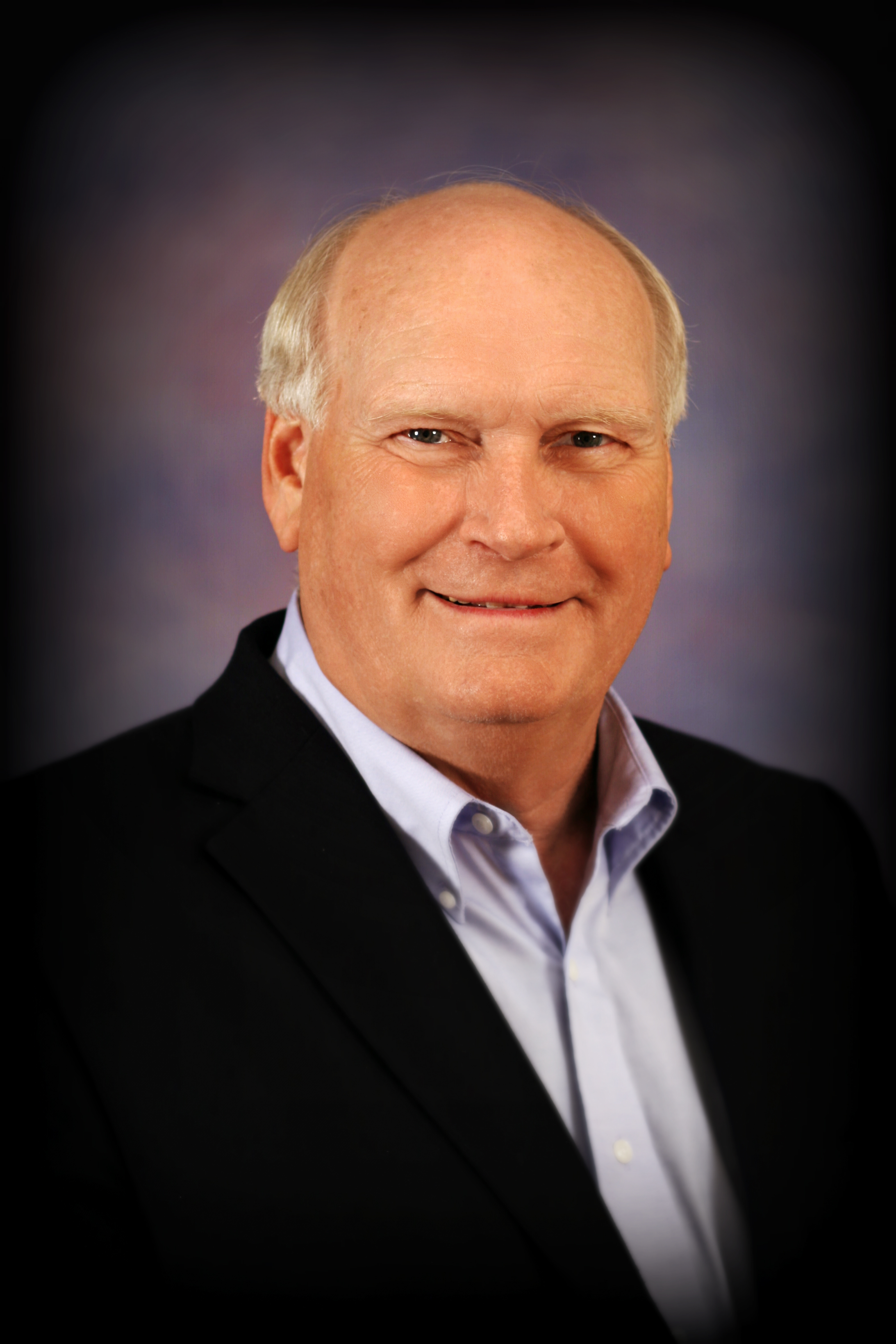
Administrator & CEO Kansas Soybean

Kenlon Johannes (born March 2, 1949) is an American businessman and the former Administrator and CEO of the Kansas Soybean Commission and Association. His continued advocacy for biodiesel spans three decades, and he is credited with being the driving force behind the growth of soybean oil within the biodiesel industry, granting him the nickname “the ‘godfather’ of biodiesel.” Johannes has also served as the executive director for multiple soybean organizations.

== College and early career ==
Born in Leigh, Nebraska, Johannes earned a Bachelor of Science degree from Concordia University Nebraska in education and performed graduate studies at the University of Nebraska. Johannes then taught grade-school during a span of 4.5 years before returning to home in Nebraska to grow soybeans and corn and raise livestock on his family farm.

As a farmer, Johannes became involved in soybean advocacy, joining the Nebraska Soybean Association, followed by the Nebraska Soybean Checkoff Board in 1980. He was later appointed as the Nebraska representative to the American Soybean Development Foundation in 1982, where he was later elected assistant treasurer. In 1986, he became the executive director of both the Wisconsin Soybean Association and the Wisconsin Corn Growers Association, as well as their checkoff boards. In 1988, he was hired as the executive director for the Missouri Soybean Association and the Missouri Soybean Merchandising Council (MSMC).

== Biodiesel and soybean advocacy ==
Johannes first became interested in the concept of soy-diesel, after reading a report by the American Soybean Association that involved using soybean oil in a diesel engine. In his position with the Missouri Soybean Association in 1991, he expanded efforts to use soybean oil in industrial application such as a biodiesel as an alternative to petrodiesel. Later that year, Johannes arranged the first commercial sale of soy diesel to exclusively fuel a 1991 Dodge truck, purchased by the Missouri Soybean Association. At the 1992 Corn Soybean Expo in Fargo, North Dakota, Johannes explained the process of transesterification and its resulting byproducts such as biodiesel, and told the group that the market for soy-diesel could top 150 million gallons in the next three years.

Johannes served as staff for the National Soy Fuels Advisory Committee (NSFAC), which was created in 1992 by state Qualified State Soybean Boards for the purpose of establishing the groundwork and strategy to create a national demand for soy diesel. Later that year, under Johannes' guidance, and after commissioning a study to help chart the course for its members, NSFAC formed the National SoyDiesel Development Board (NSDB) to supervise and implement soy diesel research and market development projects. Johannes was hired as the first executive director of the National SoyDiesel Development Board (NSDB) in 1993, later renamed the National Biodiesel Board, where he played a critical role in creating a foundation for policy, research, and development of biodiesel using soybean oil and other feedstocks.

In June 1993, Johannes presented a paper on U.S. farmers' efforts to commercialize biodiesel at the International Energy Agency on "Vegetable Oils as Transportation Fuels in the United States," at the University of Pisa in Pisa, Italy. That same year, the NSDB under Johannes' leadership, began funding pilot programs to facilitate using 20 percent biodiesel blends in ten transit agencies across the nation, including Los Angeles, California. The use of biodiesel was estimated to cut 5,400 pounds of pollution in a six-month period.

In 1995, Johannes and colleagues submitted a three-step marketing plan to the National Biodiesel Board, which helped to expand the industry and to establish the framework for creating quality standards for biodiesel production.

Since the creation of the NSDB (and subsequent organizations), soybean producers have seen a 15 percent growth of price support through biodiesel alone, and Johannes' has continued to advocate for the environmental benefits of soy diesel's use to the nation's largest fleets. In 2017, the National Biodiesel Board featured Johannes in their opening video advertisement where he reflects on the progression of biodiesel throughout the years.

In 2001, Johannes became CEO of the Kansas Soybean Association and Administrator of the Kansas Soybean Commission where he works on behalf of soybean farmers to advance markets. In this role, he has been involved in international marketing on behalf of soybean farmers, working with the biodiesel, animal agriculture, and aquaculture industries.

Johannes advocated for the growth of the biodiesel industry in a 2016 EPA hearing where he urged the EPA to recognize the significant reduction of carbon that results from biodiesel use. He also emphasized the positive effects on the economy that have come as a byproduct from the creation of the industry. In written 2016 testimony to the Environmental Protection Agency (EPA), Johannes requested that the EPA continue to raise volume number requirements of biodiesel. In September 2017, Johannes traveled to Japan as a member of the "Heartland Team" with the U.S. Meat Export Federation (USMEF) to meet with buyers of U.S. pork and beef.

== Awards and honors ==
- 2008: Johannes was inducted into the Nebraska Softball Hall of Fame from his twenty-four years playing with fast-pitch teams across Nebraska. His highest yearly batting average was .537.
- 2009: The National Biodiesel Board presented Johannes with the National Biodiesel Board Pioneer Award in honor of his service to the biodiesel industry.
- 2012: The Great Plains Canola Association (GPCA) inducted Johannes into their hall of fame. Johannes served as the first executive director from 2007-2012; he was the second person to receive that recognition.
- 2019: Inducted into the Nebraska Rock and Roll Hall of Fame as a member of the band 'The Web of Sound.'
- 2020: Recipient of the 2020 American Soybean Association "Pinnacle Award" for his life-long support of promoting the "soybean industry and soy-based value-added products, including biodiesel."
- 2021: Honored by the National Biodiesel Board, now called Clean Fuels Alliance America, naming their Pioneer Award after him: the “Kenlon Johannes Pioneer Award”.
- 2021: Awarded an Admiralship in the Great Navy of the State of Nebraska by Governor Pete Rickets.
- 2022: Received the Kansas Soybean Association’s “Friend of Soy” Award.
