= Lübke =

Lübke is a surname. Notable people with the surname include:

- Andreas Lübke (born 1967), German football forward
- Heinrich Lübke (1892–1972), West German politician
- Irno Lubke (1934–1969), Brazilian footballer
- Ralf Lübke (born 1965), German athlete
- Wilhelm Lübke (1826–1893), German art historian
- Wilhelm Meyer-Lübke (1861–1936), Swiss philologist
- Wilhelmine Lübke, (1885–1981), wife of President Heinrich Lübke

== See also ==
- Frederick C. Luebke (born 1927), American historian
