= Conrad Aumann =

American athlete and coach (1933–2006)

Biographical details
- Born: September 17, 1933; Detroit, Michigan, U.S.
- Died: December 23, 2006 (aged 73); Chicago, Illinois, U.S.

Playing career

Football
- 1951–1953: Valparaiso

Baseball
- 1951–1954: Valparaiso
- Position: Quarterback (football)

Coaching career (HC unless noted)

Football
- 1964–1982: Concordia (IL)

Baseball
- 1966–1979: Concordia (IL)

Softball
- 1984–1991: Concordia (IL)

Head coaching record
- Overall: 70–87–5 (football); 125–127–3 (baseball); 69–111 (softball)

Conrad J. Aumann (September 17, 1933 – December 23, 2006) was an American football, baseball, and softball coach. He served as the head football coach at Concordia University Chicago from 1964 to 1982, compiling a record of 70–87–5. He was also the head baseball coach at Concordia from 1966 to 1979, tallying a mark of 125–127–3.

Aumann was born on September 17, 1933, in Detroit, Michigan. He died at the Bethesda Home in Chicago, Illinois, on December 23, 2006.
