= Mike Vaught =

American athletic director

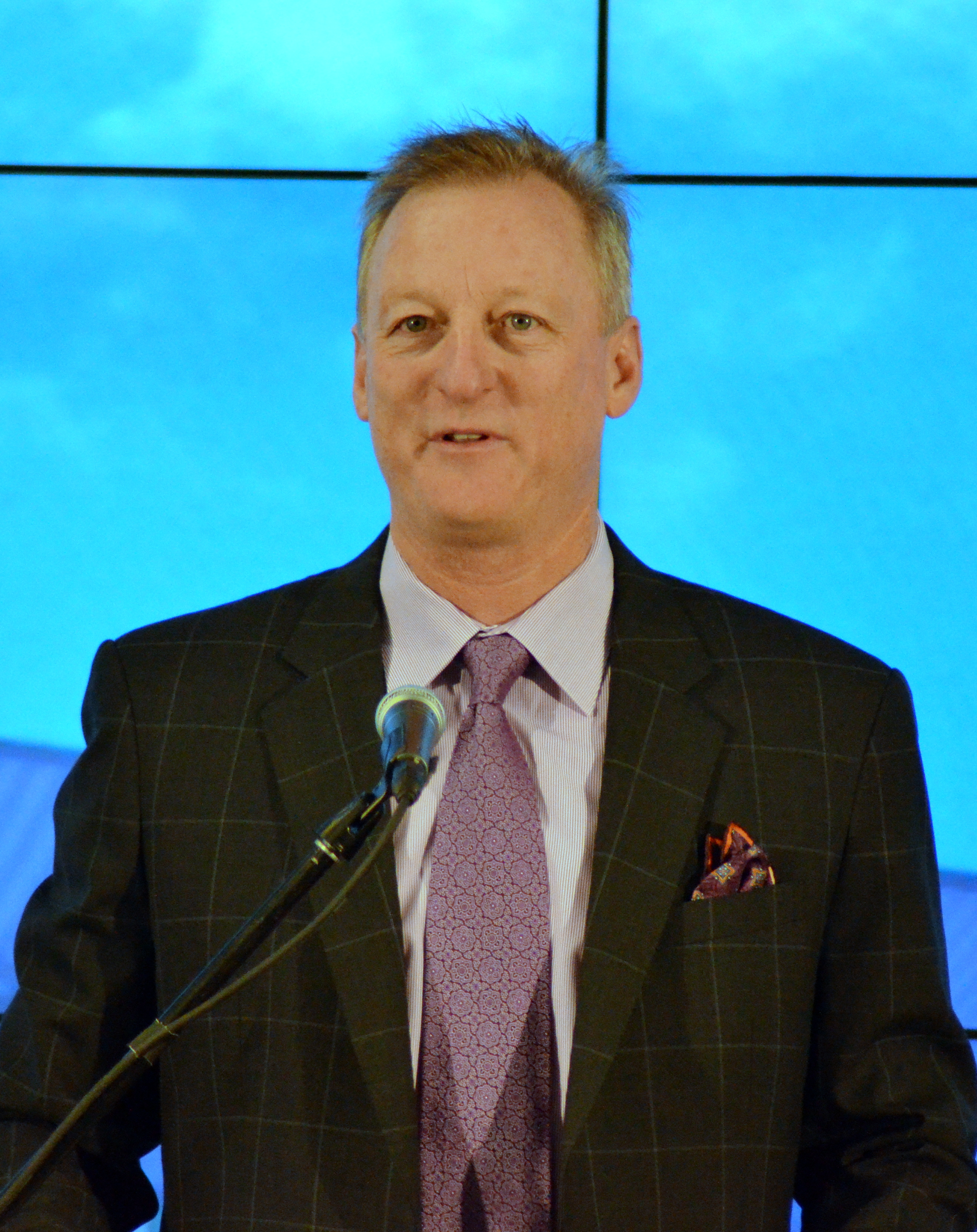
- Vaught in 2015 at Grand Canyon University
- Born: c. 1961 (age 64–65)
- Education: B.S. in Physical Education, Arkansas Tech University
- Occupation: Vice President of Athletics
- Years active: 2014-present
- Employer: Grand Canyon University
- Spouse: Karri Vaught (m. 1988)

Mike Vaught (born c. 1961) is a former athletic administrator who previously served as the athletic director at Grand Canyon University in Phoenix, Arizona, being named to the position on October 15, 2014 and resigning on August 12, 2019. He had previously served as deputy athletic director at Southern Methodist University and assistant athletic director at Rice University. Aside from athletic administration, Vaught has been an assistant football coach at University of Arkansas, Missouri State University, Texas State University and the United States Naval Academy. Prior to accepting the position at Grand Canyon, Vaught was the director of corporate sponsorship at AdvoCare.

== Football coach ==
Mike Vaught
Coaching career (HC unless noted)
- 1984-85: Arkansas (GA)
- 1986-93: Missouri State (Assistant)
- 1992-94: Texas State (Assistant)
- 1995-2001: Navy (OC)

Vaught began his coaching career in the 1984 season, serving as a graduate assistant at Arkansas. He went on to coach at Missouri State and Texas State before serving as the offensive coordinator at Navy. Under his direction, Navy's rushing attack was the top-ranked in the country in 1999.

== Athletic administration ==
Vaught got his start in athletic administration at Alamo Heights Independent School District and Montgomery Bell Academy, accumulating five years of athletic director experience in high school athletics.

=== Rice ===
In the position of assistant athletic director for football operations, Vaught made a notable impact in his short six-month stint at the university. Working in concert with Rice head coach Todd Graham, the program made its first bowl game appearance in 45 years. Vaught also bolstered his reputation as a fundraiser, bringing in $5 million for the program in 14 weeks.

=== Southern Methodist ===
Vaught served six years as the deputy athletic director at SMU. Highlights of his career at the university included assisting in the hiring of football coach June Jones and men's basketball coach Larry Brown. In 2009, the SMU football program ended a 25-year bowl game drought, symbolizing the revitalization of the program following the death penalty in 1987.

Fundraising reached all-time highs in the athletic department, as annual gifts broke the $6 million mark for the first time in school history. In 2011, over $10.5 million in financial gifts were received by the athletic department. During his tenure, SMU opened a $13 million basketball practice facility in February 2008 and a tennis stadium in the same year. Various major upgrades to existing facilities were completed while Vaught served at SMU.

=== Grand Canyon ===
The transitioning Division I school announced it was searching for a new athletic director in the summer of 2014. The school's president and CEO, Brian Mueller, sensed a need for change with potential shifts in the collegiate sports landscape. Vaught's predecessor, Keith Baker, was replaced after 20 years in the position which included two Learfield Sports' Directors Cups for the best Division II athletics program. Vaught was matched with GCU through the search firm Eastman & Beaudine.

In an October 15, 2014 press conference at the newly renovated GCU Arena, Vaught was officially named as the university's vice president of athletics. "Our vision for the athletic department is to be top 25 in everything we do," Vaught said. "We’ll put a plan in place to get there and take the steps necessary to achieve that."

The announcement was characterized as a "home run hire" by TCU athletic director Chris Del Conte, while Arizona State head football coach Todd Graham called Vaught "a talented administrator whose expertise will greatly benefit GCU."

Vaught's first coaching hire at GCU was bringing in Schellas Hyndman to head the school's men's soccer team. Hyndman was previously the head coach of FC Dallas of Major League Soccer and was the MLS Coach of the Year in 2010.

Vaught's resignation was announced on July 31, 2019, and became effective on August 12, 2019. Jamie Boggs was named interim athletic director before later assuming the position permanently.
