= Tom Mueller (American football, born 1946) =

American football coach (born 1946)

Biographical details
- Born: January 5, 1946 (age 80); Cleveland, Ohio, U.S.
- Education: Concordia University Nebraska

Coaching career (HC unless noted)
- 1969–1970: Detroit Luther HS (MI) (DC/DL)
- 1971–1975: Texas Lutheran (DC)
- 1976: North Dakota State (WR)
- 1977–1978: North Dakota State (DC)
- 1979–1982: Southwest Texas State (DC)
- 1983–1987: TCU (DC)
- 1988–1992: TCU (RC)
- 2002–2006: Texas Lutheran

Head coaching record
- Overall: 22–28

Tom Mueller (born January 5, 1946) is an American former football coach. He served as the head football coach at the Texas Lutheran University from 2002 to 2006, compiling a record of 22–28. Mueller was born on January 5, 1946, in Cleveland, Ohio. He earned a Bachelor of Science degree from Concordia University Nebraska in 1968 and a Master of Science degree from Eastern Michigan University.

== Head coaching record ==
Year	Team	Overall	Conference	Standing	Bowl/playoffs
Texas Lutheran Bulldogs (American Southwest Conference) (2002–2006)
2002	Texas Lutheran	2–8	2–7	8th	
2003	Texas Lutheran	2–8	2–7	T–8th	
2004	Texas Lutheran	7–3	7–2	3rd	
2005	Texas Lutheran	5–5	5–4	5th	
2006	Texas Lutheran	6–4	4–4	T–4th	
Nebraska–Omaha:		22–28	20–24		
Total:		22–28			
