= John Pierson (baseball) =

American baseball player and coach (born 1953)

- Second Baseman / Coach
- Born: October 5, 1953 (age 72); Phoenix, Arizona, U.S.
- Bats: Right Throws: Right
- Stats at Baseball Reference

Teams
- As coach: Miami Marlins (2013)

John Camden Pierson (born October 5, 1953) is an American former professional baseball second baseman and coach. He was the hitting coach for the Miami Marlins of Major League Baseball in 2013.

== Career ==
Pierson was selected by the Kansas City Royals in the first round of the 1973 Major League Baseball draft. He served as the Marlins' minor league hitting coordinator before being appointed to replace Tino Martinez on July 28, 2013, on an interim basis.

Pierson was a longtime hitting coach for college programs in the Phoenix, Arizona area: Phoenix College (1977-79), Grand Canyon (1980-91) and Arizona State (1992-94). He then moved to the professional ranks and spent time in the Chicago Cubs and Tampa Bay Rays organizations.

In May 2002, Pierson was named the athletic director at Grand Canyon. Pierson was instrumental in beginning the school's softball program, which began play in 2004. Pierson's name — along with GCU baseball coach Dave Stapleton's — was honored on the program's stadium as Stapleton-Pierson Stadium until the university constructed a new stadium for 2017. Pierson resigned in January 2004 to return to professional baseball.
