= Concordia University Nebraska =

Lutheran university in Seward, Nebraska, US

Concordia University, Nebraska
- Former names: Evangelische Lutherische Schullehrer Seminar (1894–1924); Concordia Teachers College (1924–1974); Concordia College (1974–1998)
- Type: Private university
- Established: 1894; 132 years ago
- Religious affiliation: Lutheran Church–Missouri Synod
- Endowment: $70,806,731 (2026)
- President: Bernard Bull
- Provost: Timothy Preus
- Students: >2,300
- Undergraduates: 1,951
- Postgraduates: 768
- Location: Seward, Nebraska, United States; 40°54′51″N 97°05′27.35″W
- Campus: Seward campus: Rural 85 acres (34 ha) Lincoln campus: Suburban
- Colors: Navy Blue & White
- Nickname: Bulldogs
- Sporting affiliations: NAIA – GPAC
- Mascot: Bulldog
- Website: cune.edu

Concordia University, Nebraska is a private Lutheran university in Seward, Nebraska. It was established in 1894 and is affiliated with the Lutheran Church–Missouri Synod as one of seven schools in the Concordia University System. The university is organized into three schools: the College of Arts and Sciences, the College of Education, and the College of Graduate Studies.

== History ==
=== Founding and early years ===
Efforts by four Seward businessmen, including the gift of 20 acres (8.1 ha) of land and $8,000, led the district to settle on Seward as the site for the college. The school, then named the Evangelisches Lutherisches Schullehrer-Seminar (Evangelical Lutheran Teachers' Seminary), was officially dedicated on November 18, 1894. Two days later, classes began with its 13 students boarded, fed, and taught in the same building (now Founders Hall) by J. George Weller and his wife. Students were originally taught for three years before transferring to Addison Teachers Seminary to continue their instruction.

The academic programs were expanded in 1905 with the addition of two years of college studies. By 1908, a fourth year of high school was added to the program. Throughout the early years, the local community provided support to "The German College", as it was unofficially termed, including foodstuffs, housing, and funding. While most classes were conducted in German, English was also taught and used.

Historic Photos of Concordia University Nebraska

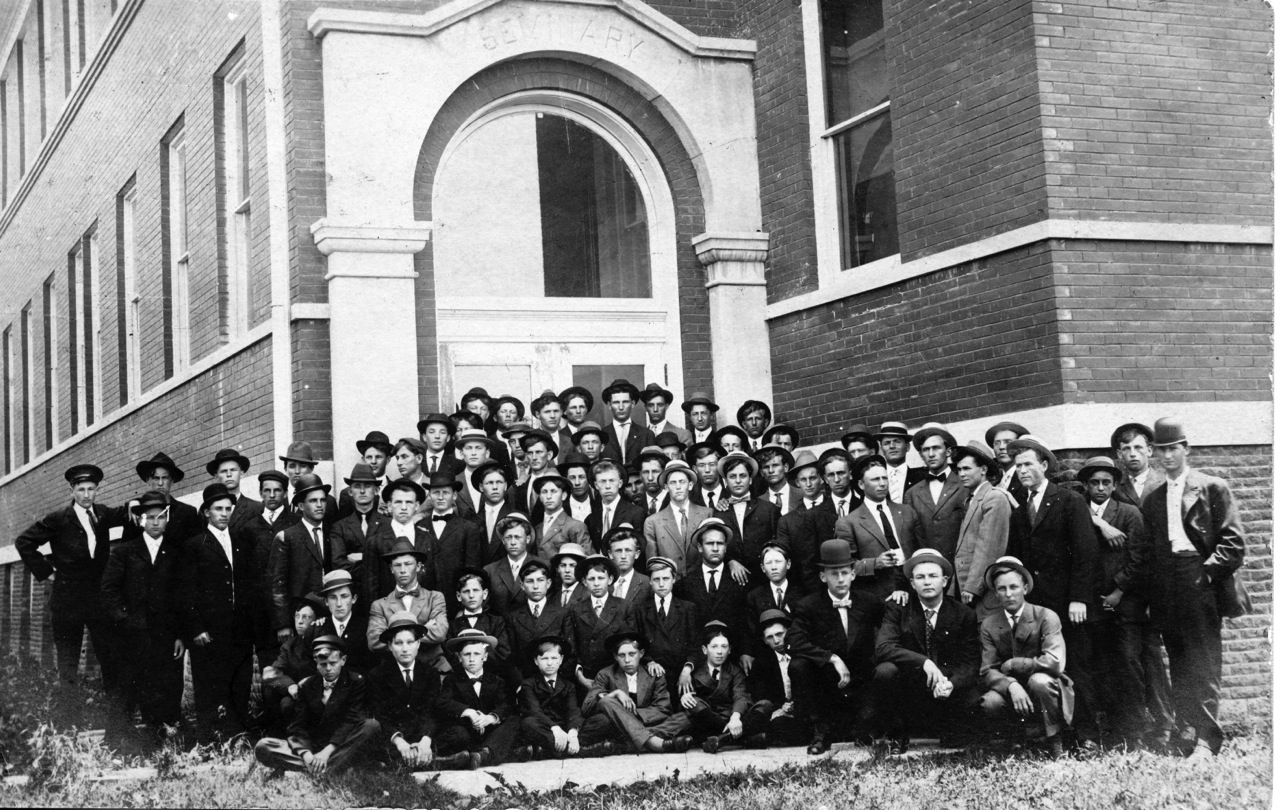
Concordia University Nebraska students in 1908

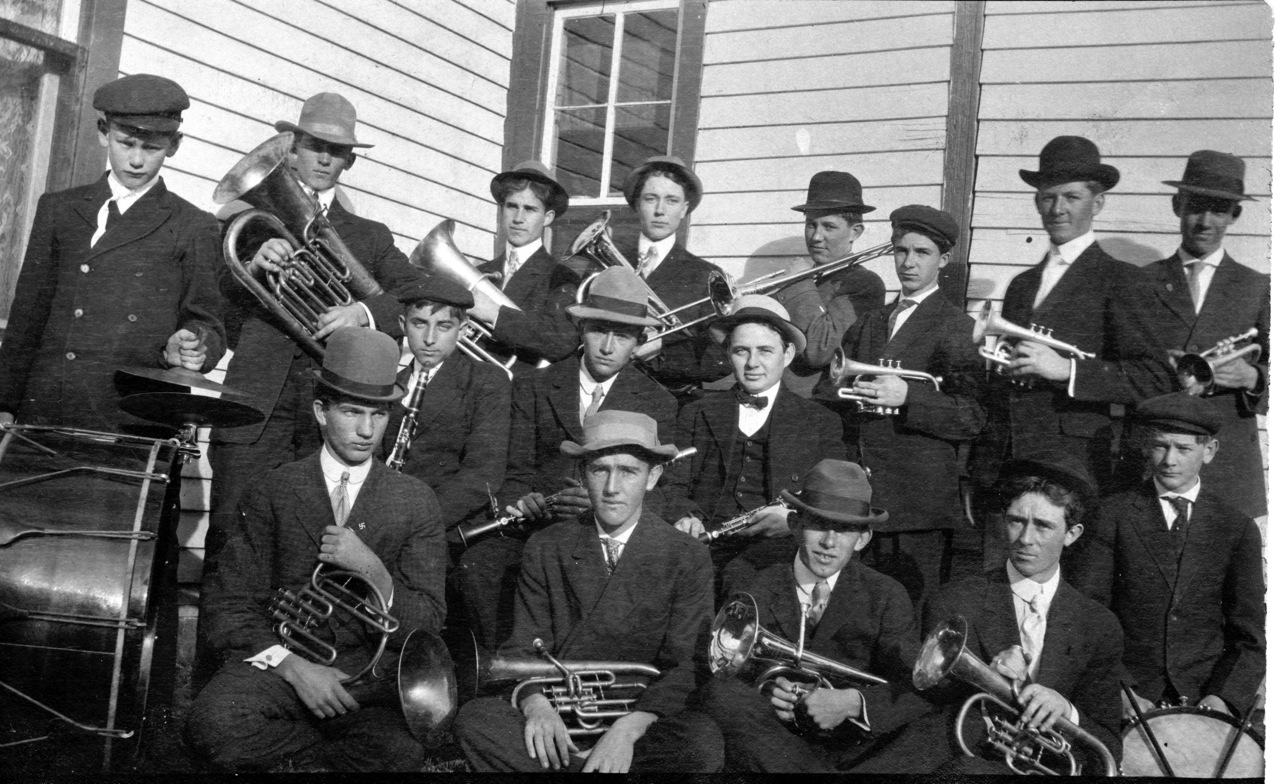
Concordia Nebraska band in 1908

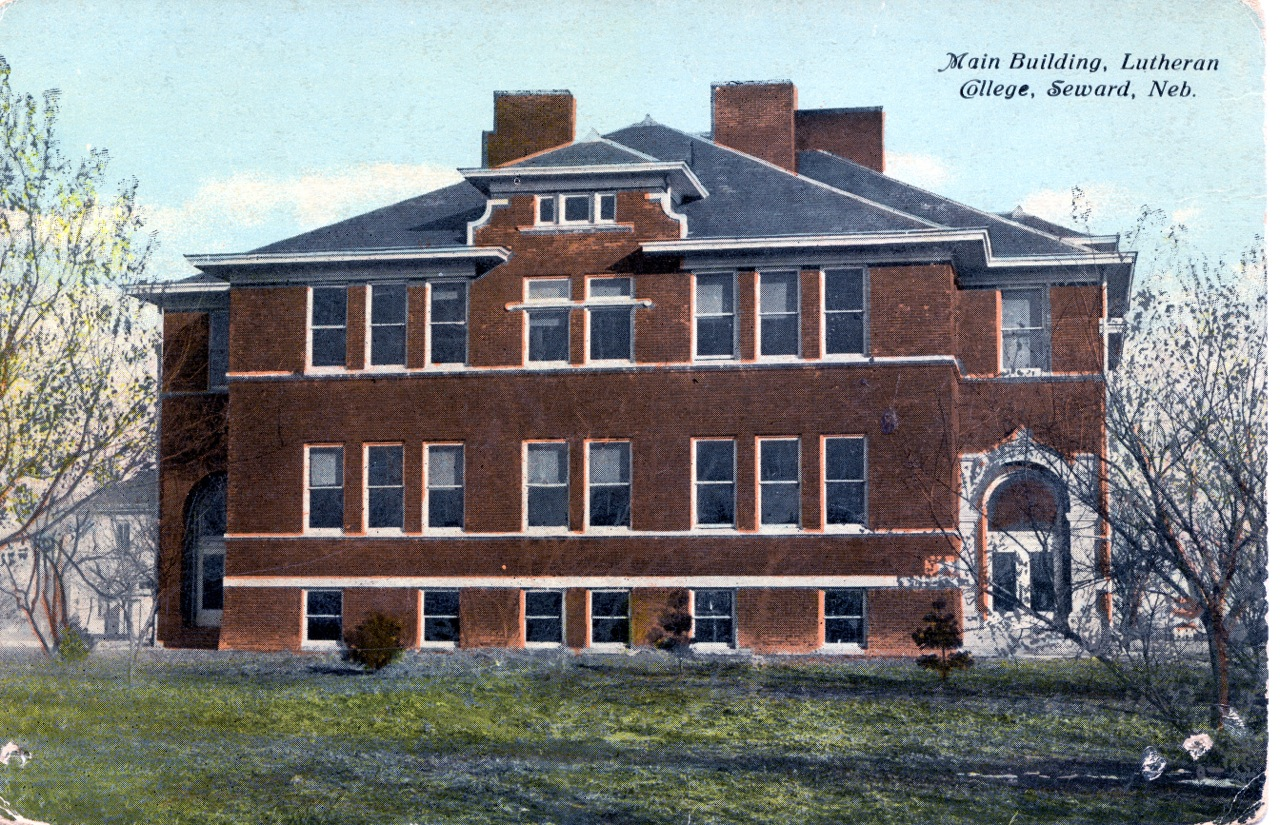
Becker Hall housed many activities before being demolished in 1999

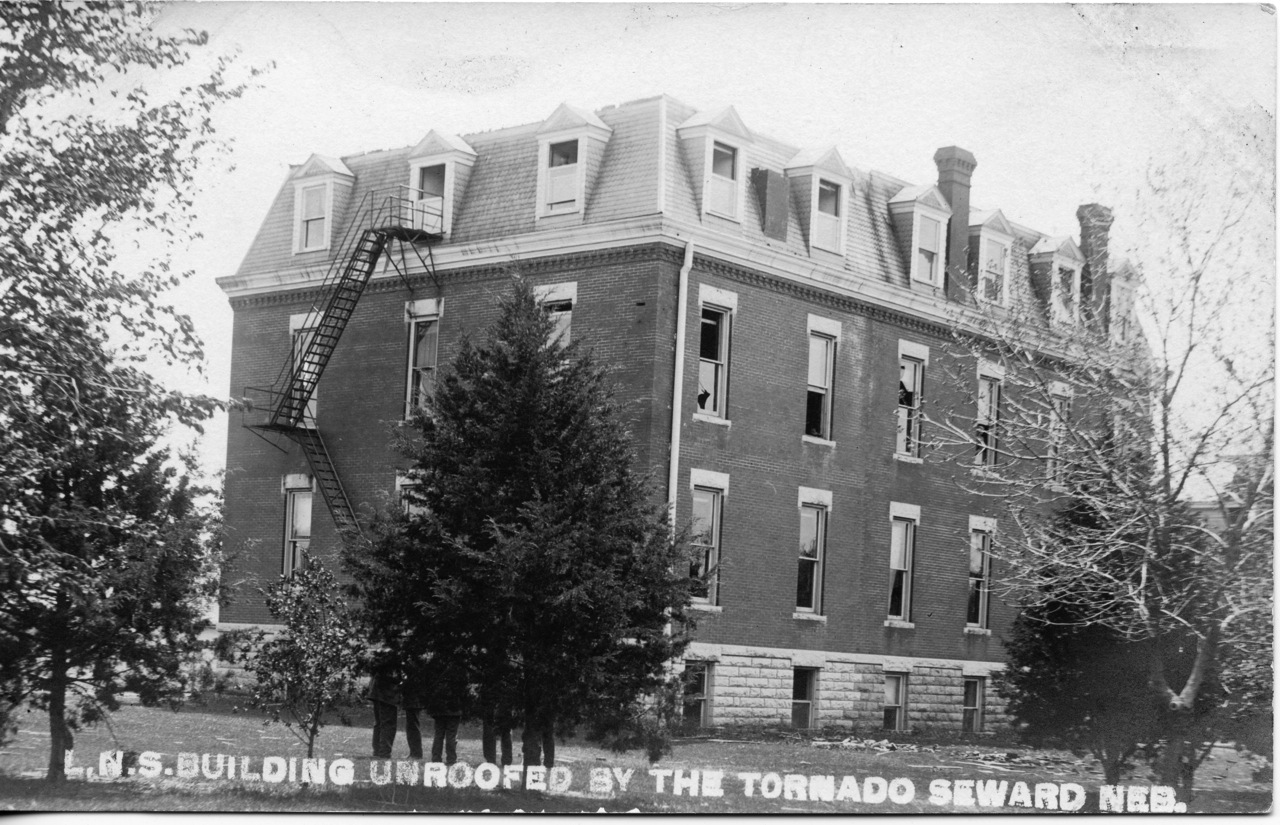
Tornado damage to Founders Hall - May 14, 1913

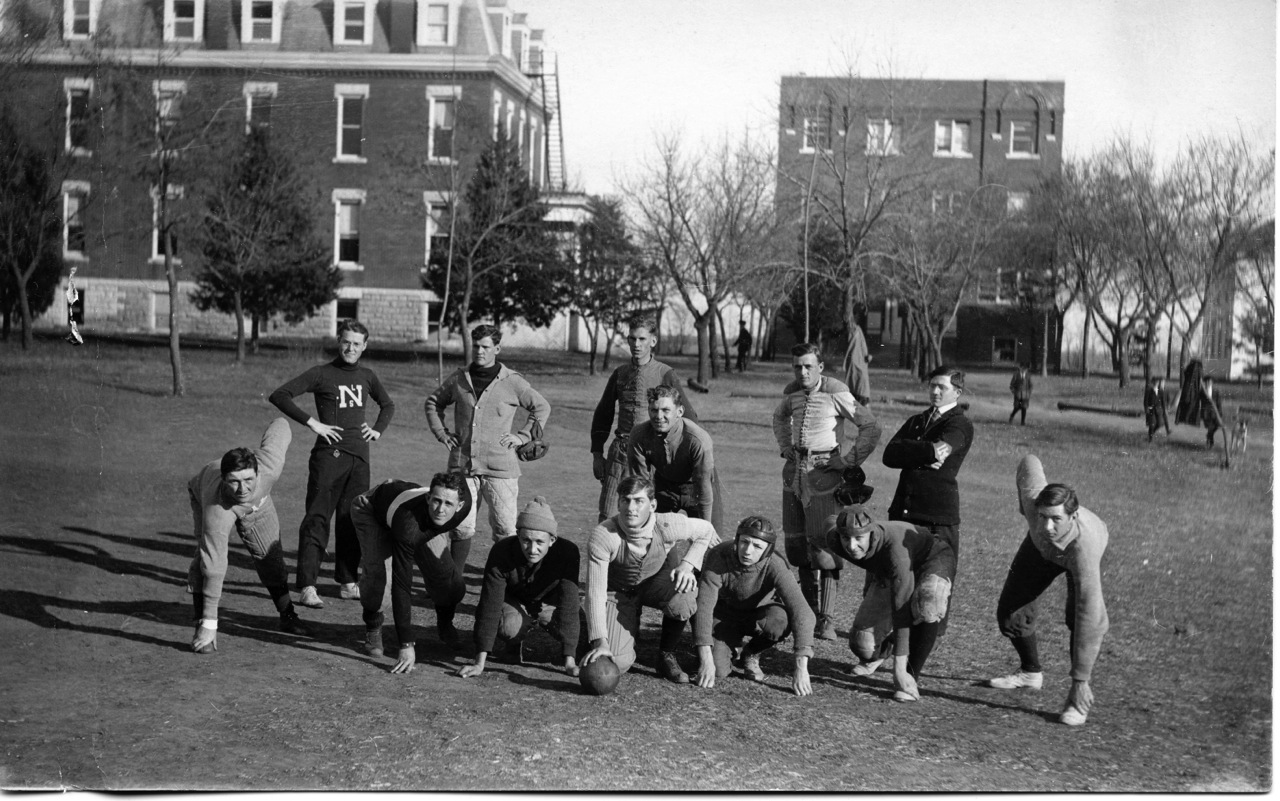
Concordia football team in the 1920s

With the outbreak of World War I in 1914, the school faced significant anti-German sentiment by the local populace despite Director Jesse's support as a Four Minute Man. In a demonstration of their American pride, the school changed the language of all its classes to English and constructed a 100 ft (30 m) flagpole, said to be the tallest in the county. After the war, the school was accredited as a junior college and became co-ed in 1919 although women boarded with families off-campus. In December 1918, the Lutheran Seminary, as the university was then named, suffered infection during the 1918 flu pandemic with at least 15% of the student body being infected and one student dying. The school suffered another less-severe outbreak in 1920.

=== Concordia Teacher's College ===
University presidents
1.	J. George Weller	1894-1914
2.	F. W. C. Jesse	1914-1923
3.	C. F. Brommer	1924-1941
4.	A. O. Fuerbringer	1941-1953
5.	Paul A. Zimmermann	1954-1961
Interim	Mark A. Schmidt	1962-1963
6.	W. Theophil Janzow	1963-1977
7.	Michael J. Stelmachowicz	1978-1984
8.	Ralph L. Reinke	1986-1990
9.	Orville Walz	1990-2004
10.	Brian Friedrich	2004-2019
Interim	Russ Sommerfeld	2019-2021
11.	Bernard Bull	2021–present

The first bachelor's degrees were awarded in 1940. The school became an accredited four-year institution in the late 1940s. In 1959, Concordia became the first of the LCMS schools to be accredited by the National Council for the Accreditation of Teacher Education. The school was named Concordia Teacher's College, reflecting the largest program until the addition of liberal arts majors in the 1970s. The school was again renamed to Concordia College from 1974 to 1998.

The university grew and expanded its programs, including science labs, a large library, and multiple residence halls. Business, art, science, and health-related programs were added to the teaching and pre-seminary courses. Graduate programs were added in 1968. With the increase in enrollment came new programs and professors, many who were housed along Faculty Lane.

=== Growth into university ===
The college became part of the newly established Concordia University System in 1995. and became a university in 1998 and was renamed Concordia University Nebraska. Concordia opened a 8,550-square-foot (794 m^{2}) location in Lincoln's Fallbrook development to house graduate classes.

Throughout the 2000s, despite the growth of secular studies, the church-work programs continued to flourish with Concordia having graduated nearly 30% of LCMS church workers by 2019.

In 2009, the Walz Health and Human Performance Complex was completed, significantly improving the athletic facilities and performance spaces. The newest building on the campus is the Dunklau Center for Science, Math and Business, completed in 2019. The Dunklau Center added 58,000 square feet (5,400 m^{2}) primarily to the sciences while renovating existing spaces for other programs including the new agricultural program.

In 1996, the college hosted the first annual Plum Creek Children's Literacy Festival. The festival now brings nearly 10,000 school-aged students and teachers to campus to interact with authors and illustrators. It has included famous authors such as Lois Lowry, John R. Erickson, and Richard Peck. In 2021 the University canceled the Plum Creek Children's Literacy Festival two days before the event was scheduled after multiple authors and illustrators withdrew from the event upon learning of the school's opposition to homosexuality for religious reasons.

The current president of Concordia University is Dr. Bernard Bull.

== Campus ==
The main campus is 85 acres (34 ha) in the town of Seward, Nebraska, with over 11 academic and administration buildings and 11 residence halls. Notable buildings include:

- The Music Center. Offices for the music department are located here as well as a number of practice rooms equipped with pianos and organs. In 2008, a Casavant Freres pipe organ was installed in the recital hall, Heine Hall. A black box theater in the basement of the center serves as a venue for intimate theatrical performances throughout the year.
- The Heartfelt Memorial features several sculptures and a garden dedicated to the memory of deceased children. It was completed in 2015.
Campus of Concordia University Nebraska

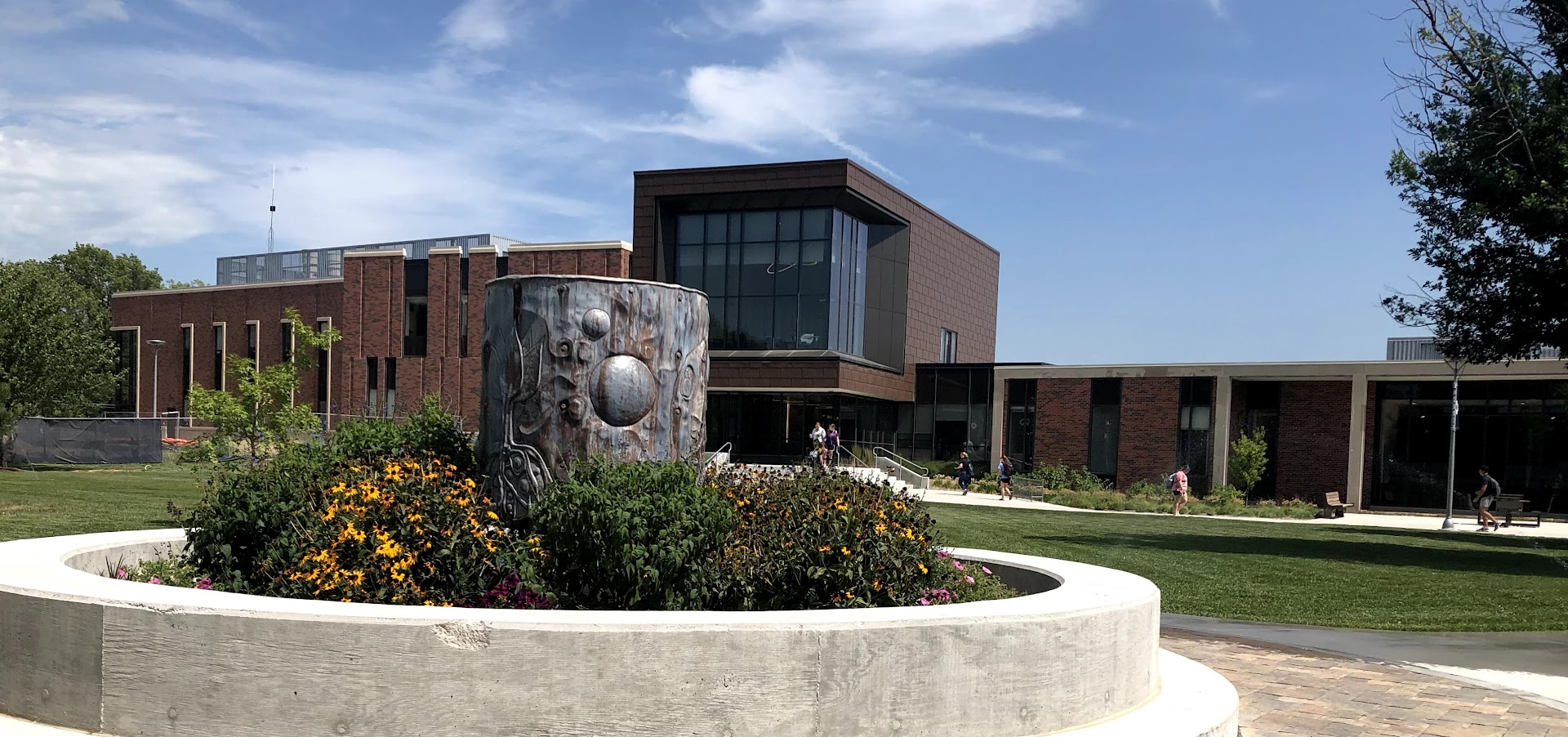
Dunklau Center for Science, Math and Business

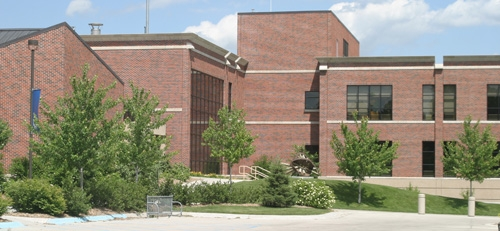
The Thom Leadership Education Center

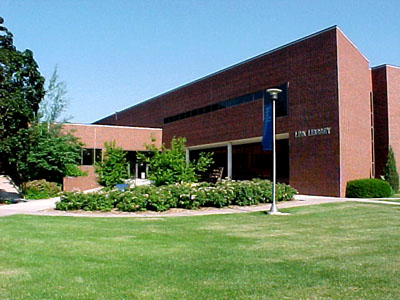
Link Library

== Academics ==
The university is organized into three schools—the College of Arts and Sciences, the College of Education, and the College of Graduate Studies. Concordia University is institutionally accredited by the Higher Learning Commission. The teacher education programs are accredited by the Council for the Accreditation of Educator Preparation (CAEP); music programs are accredited by the National Association of Schools of Music (NASM); and the institution's business program is accredited by the International Assembly for Collegiate Business Education (IACBE).

=== Undergraduate ===
Concordia awards bachelor's degrees in more than 50 undergraduate programs. In addition, the university awards the Lutheran Teacher Diploma, Christian Teacher Diploma, the Director of Christian Education, and Director of Parish Music certificate. Graduates of these programs serve as rostered church workers in the Lutheran Church–Missouri Synod. Pre-seminary and pre-deaconess programs are also available, including the necessary language courses to attend the seminaries of the LCMS.

=== Graduate ===
Concordia University offers several master's degrees. These programs offer a majority of their courses online. Most face-to-face classes meet in Seward, Neb.

== Student life ==
Student body composition as of May 2, 2022
Race and ethnicity	Total
White	79%
Other (Note: Other consists of Multiracial Americans & those who prefer to not say.)	10%
Hispanic	6%
Foreign national	2%
Black	2%
Asian	1%
Economic diversity
Low-income (Note: The percentage of students who received an income-based federal Pell grant intended for low-income students.)	28%
Affluent (Note: The percentage of students who are a part of the American middle class at the bare minimum.)	72%

As of August 23, 2022, the student body included 1,124 undergraduate students. 52% of students are male and 48% are female. Students are expected to uphold biblical practices in line with LCMS doctrine including sexual relations between heterosexual, married couples.

=== Residence halls ===
There are currently 11 residence halls (dormitories) on the university's Seward campus. These dorms are separated by gender, with the exclusion of Jonathan Hall.

=== Extracurricular activities ===
Over 30 clubs and organizations exist on campus, ranging from service-oriented groups to intramural teams to academic support groups to honorary societies. The Sower is the university's bi-weekly newspaper. The Tower is the title of the institution's yearbook. The Curtain Club performs drama. The Student Activity Committee (SAC) organizes concerts, comedy shows, free movies, bowling nights and the popular Spring Weekend. Concordia also has a Speech and Debate team.

=== Visual arts ===
Concordia's art students exhibit their artwork at the on-campus Marxhausen Gallery of Art. The Marxhausen Gallery also intermittently hosts visiting artists from around the country who give presentations and display their art. The university's permanent collection of more than 300 works, the Koenig Collection, contains screen prints, etchings, lithographs and other original prints by nationally and internationally recognized artists. The Center for Liturgical Art at Concordia seeks to encourage and assist the Church in its ministry through the visual arts by promoting its use in worship. Students work alongside faculty and visiting artists to create a variety of pieces.

=== Homosexual lifestyle prohibition ===
Concordia University's handbook prohibits "active involvement in a homosexual lifestyle" and specifies disciplinary action against students breaking this rule. This is one of several matters related to sexuality that the handbook holds to be sinful.

Concordia previously published a journal, Issues in Christian Education, that often contained writing about the sinful nature of homosexuality. The journal has not released any new issues since Fall 2017.

In 2021, the Plum Creek Literacy Festival at Concordia was cancelled because authors withdrew their participation in the festival in protest of Concordia's LGBT prohibition. The festival had excluded books with LGBT characters by Eliot Schrefer and another author.

== Athletics ==
Sponsored Sports
Sport	Men's	Women's	Co-ed
Baseball	✓		
Basketball	✓	✓	
Cheer & dance		✓	
Cross Country	✓	✓	
Esports			✓
Football	✓		
Golf	✓	✓	
Powerlifting	✓	✓	
Shooting Sports			✓
Soccer	✓	✓	
Softball		✓	
Tennis	✓	✓	
Track & field	✓	✓	
Volleyball		✓	
Wrestling	✓		

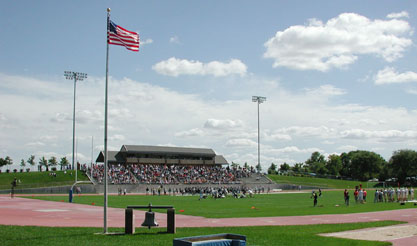
Facilities include the 1,400-seat stadium and track & field constructed in 1997.

The Concordia–Nebraska athletic teams are called the Bulldogs. The university is a member of the National Association of Intercollegiate Athletics (NAIA), primarily competing in the Great Plains Athletic Conference (GPAC) since the 1969–70 academic year. The school mascot is the Bulldog.

Concordia–Nebraska competes in 23 intercollegiate varsity sports: Men's sports include baseball, basketball, cross country, football, golf, powerlifting, soccer, tennis, track & field, and wrestling; while women's sports include basketball, cheerleading, cross country, dance, golf, powerlifting, soccer, softball, tennis, track & field and volleyball; and co-ed sports include eSports and shooting sports.

=== Accomplishments ===
The Bulldogs have won three NAIA National Championships: men's outdoor track & field (2015), women's outdoor track & field (2016), and women's basketball (2019). Concordia's softball team appeared in two Women's College World Series in 1970 and 1971. The university also has many intramural sports.

=== Facilities ===
Concordia Nebraska's teams use the newly constructed Walz Human Performance Complex, Bulldog Stadium, and Plum Creek Park baseball and softball fields for competitions.

=== Concordia Invitational Tournament (CIT) ===
Since 1950, Concordia has competed in an annual men's basketball tournament against other LCMS universities. A women's tournament was added in 1965. Throughout the history of CIT, Concordia Nebraska holds the best aggregate record in both the men's and women's tournaments. Since 2001 the teams are: Concordia University, Nebraska, Concordia University Wisconsin, Concordia University Chicago and Concordia University, Ann Arbor.

== Notable people ==
=== Alumni ===
- Dan Cloeter - Runner including winner of the 1977 and 1979 Chicago Marathon
- Jeanne Combs - Nebraska state representative from the 32nd District from 2003 to 2007
- Toby Down - Professional soccer player
- Gris Grimly (Steven Soenksen) - Illustrator and author
- Mary Ann Hanusa - Iowa state representative from 2011 to 2021
- Alice Hausman - Member of the Minnesota House of Representatives since 1989
- Amanda Husberg - Composer of hymns
- Kenlon Johannes - Businessman and CEO of Kansas Soybean Commission and Association
- Frederick C. Luebke - Historian
- David Morgan - Professor and scholar
- Brian Mueller - President of Grand Canyon University
- Tom Mueller - College football coach
- Brian Naber - College football coach
- John Seevers - College football coach
- Roby Smith - Treasurer of Iowa and former Iowa state senator from the 47th District from 2011 - 2022
- Annette Sweeney - Iowa state senator from the 25th District since 2018 and member of the Iowa House of Representatives from 2009 to 2013
- Robert Sylwester - Emeritus professor of education at the University of Oregon and recipient of awards for cognitive neuroscience research
- Andrea von Kampen - folk singer and songwriter

=== Faculty ===
- Bernard Bull - University president and scholar
- Ron Harms - College football coach
- Alan Harre - University president and administrator
- Reinhold Marxhausen - Artist
- Ralph Starenko - College football coach
