= Jamie Boggs =

American athletic administrator

Current position
- Title: Athletic director
- Team: Grand Canyon
- Conference: Mountain West

Biographical details
- Born: April 10, 1978 (age 48)
- Education: University of San Diego; University of Arizona

Administrative career (AD unless noted)
- 2003–2010: Duke (assistant AD)
- 2011–2014: Georgia State (senior associate AD)
- 2015–2019: Grand Canyon (deputy AD)
- 2019–2021: Grand Canyon (interim AD)
- 2021–present: Grand Canyon

Jamie Boggs is the current director of athletics for Grand Canyon University. Boggs was named interim athletic director at GCU on August 12, 2019, before being elevated to permanent athletic director on April 26, 2021.

== Early life and education ==
Boggs was raised in the Moon Valley area of Phoenix, Arizona, for most of her childhood and is a graduate of Xavier College Preparatory.

Boggs attended college at the University of San Diego, graduating in 1999 with a Bachelor of Arts in psychology. She later attended the University of Arizona's James E. Rogers College of Law, graduating with a Juris Doctor in 2002.

== Career ==
Boggs started her career in college athletics administration at Duke University and Georgia State University. At Duke, she began as a compliance coordinator in 2003, a compliance director in 2005 before being named assistant athletic director in 2007, becoming the youngest member of Duke's athletics senior staff. Moving to Georgia State in 2010, she was the athletic department's chief operating officer where she led the efforts to successfully transition the program to the Football Bowl Subdivision.

=== Grand Canyon ===
Boggs accepted the role of deputy athletic director at GCU in November 2014. She became an integral part of the university's successful transition from NCAA Division II to Division I, culminating with official postseason eligibility in August 2017.

Upon Mike Vaught's resignation as athletic director in 2019, Boggs was named interim athletic director. She had the interim label removed on April 26, 2021.

Boggs has held several national roles including chairing the NCAA Women's Basketball Oversight Committee and serving in the NCAA's Division I Council from 2018 to 2023. She was named one of Arizona's Most Influential Women by AZ Big Media in 2021 and was recognized with the 2021 Rising Star Award.

GCU has won six Western Athletic Conference Commissioner's Cups for the conference's top-performing athletics department since Boggs' arrival at the school. Boggs helped orchestrate GCU's acceptance into the Mountain West Conference, a move that was publicly announced on November 1, 2024.

== Personal life ==
Boggs is married to former Georgia Tech baseball star and businessman Matthew Boggs. The couple has two children: Aiden and Lilia.
