= Robert Sylwester =

Robert Alfred Sylwester
- Born: January 5, 1927; Portland, Oregon, United States
- Died: August 5, 2016 (aged 89); Eugene, Oregon
- Education: Concordia Teachers College, Nebraska; University of Oregon
- Known for: Educational Neuroscience
- Scientific career
- Fields: Curriculum and Instruction
- Workplaces: College of Education, University of Oregon
- Doctoral advisor: Donald Tope
- Doctoral students: 66 completed doctorates

Robert Alfred Sylwester (January 5, 1927 – August 5, 2016) was an Emeritus Professor of Education at the University of Oregon in the United States.

== Philosophy ==
Throughout his academic career and other works, Sylwester has focused on improving educators' personal understanding of brain systems and processes, and on providing them with simple explanations and metaphors that can be utilized to increase their students' understanding. Sylwester believes that teachers understand their curriculum best when they can effectively teach it, so encouraging an effective curriculum about brain organization can enhance both the teachers' and students' understanding of our brain. Issues that confront society involve cognitive processes, so including brain organization in school curriculum is arguably worthwhile.

== Honors ==
The Education Press Association of America has given Sylwester Distinguished Achievement Awards for two of the 18 syntheses of cognitive neuroscience research that he published in Educational Leadership, and one award for Best Series of Articles in an Educational Journal, published in The Instructor Magazine.

== Works ==
- The Adolescent Brain: Reaching for Autonomy, Robert Sylwester, Corwin Press, 2007, ISBN 978-1-4129-2611-9
- How to Explain a Brain: An Educator’s Handbook of Brain Terms and Cognitive Processes, Robert Sylwester, Corwin Press, 2005, ISBN 978-1-4129-0638-8
- A Biological Brain in a Cultural Classroom: Enhancing Cognitive and Social Development through Collaborative Classroom Management, Robert Sylwester, Corwin Press, 2003, ISBN 978-0-7619-3810-1
- Student Brains, School Issues: A Collection of Articles, Robert Sylwester, Corwin Press, 1998, ISBN 978-1-57517-046-6
- A Celebration of Neurons: An Educator's Guide to the Human Brain, Robert Sylwester, Association for Supervision & Curriculum Development, 1995, ISBN 978-0-87120-243-7

== Personal life and death ==
Sylwester died at his home in Eugene, Oregon, on August 5, 2016, at the age of 89. He was preceded in death by his wife, Ruth Eileen Maier Sylwester. He is survived by seven adult children and twenty grandchildren.
