= John Seevers =

American football coach

Playing career
- ?–1951: Concordia (NE)
- Position: Quarterback

Coaching career (HC unless noted)
- 1970–1976: Concordia (NE)

Head coaching record
- Overall: 31–32–3

Accomplishments and honors

Championships
- 1 NIAC (1970)

John J. Seevers is an American former football coach. He served as the head football coach at Concordia College—now known as Concordia University Nebraska—in Seward, Nebraska from 1970 to 1976, record of 31–32–3. He lettered in football, basketball, baseball, and track at Concordia before graduating in 1952.

== Head coaching record ==
Year	Team	Overall	Conference	Standing	Bowl/playoffs
Concordia Bulldogs (Nebraska Intercollegiate Athletic Conference / Tri-State Conference) (1970)
1970	Concordia	8–1	5–0 / 5–1	1st / 2nd	
Concordia Bulldogs (Nebraska Intercollegiate Athletic Conference) (1971–1976)
1971	Concordia	3–5–1	2–2–1	T–4th	
1972	Concordia	7–2	4–1	2nd	
1973	Concordia	4–5	1–4	5th	
1974	Concordia	5–4–1	2–3	4th	
1975	Concordia	3–6–1	2–2–1	3rd	
1976	Concordia	1–9	0–5	6th	
Concordia:		31–32–3	19–18–2		
Total:		31–32–3			
National championship Conference title Conference division title or championship game berth
