= Frederick C. Luebke =

American historian (1927–2021)

Frederick Carl Luebke
- Born: January 26, 1927; Reedsburg, Wisconsin, U.S.
- Died: November 27, 2021 (aged 94); Eugene, Oregon, U.S.
- Education: Concordia Teachers College; Claremont Graduate School; University of Southern California; University of Nebraska
- Known for: American history
- Spouse: Norma Wukasch (m. 1950)
- Children: 4
- Scientific career
- Fields: History
- Workplaces: University of Nebraska
- Thesis: The political behavior of an immigrant group, the Germans of Nebraska, 1880–1900 (1966)
- Academic advisors: James C. Olson

Frederick Carl Luebke (January 26, 1927 – November 27, 2021) was an American historian who served as Charles J. Mach Distinguished Professor of History at the University of Nebraska–Lincoln. He joined the faculty of the University of Nebraska in 1968, was promoted to full professor there in 1972, and was named the Charles J. Mach Distinguished Professor of History there in 1987. He retired in 1994. As a professor, his scholarship was in the field of American history, with a particular focus on the history of the Great Plains and Nebraska, among other topics.

Luebke was born in Reedsburg, Wisconsin, and received his B.S. from Concordia Teachers College in River Forest, Illinois, in 1950. He earned an M.A. from the Clarement Graduate School in 1958, and a Ph.D. from the University of Nebraska in 1966. He was also a William Robertson Coe fellow at Stanford University in 1961.

He was the editor of the book Ethnic Voters and the Election of Lincoln, published in 1971 through the University of Nebraska Press.

Luebke retired from the University of Nebraska–Lincoln in 1994. He died on November 27, 2021, in Eugene, Oregon.
