= Bernard Bull =

American academic administrator (born 1971)

Dr. Bernard Bull
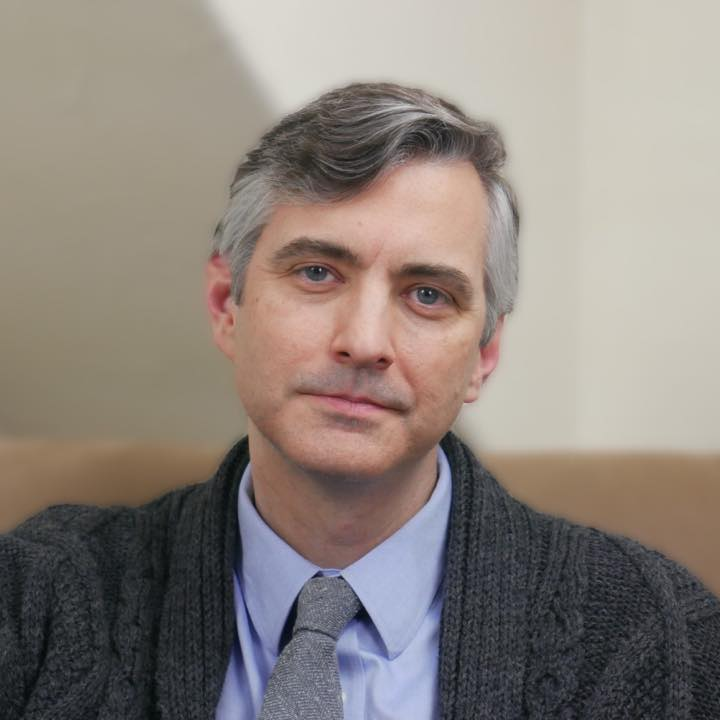

President of Concordia University Nebraska
- In office 2021–Present
- Preceded by: Rev. Dr. Brian Friedrich

President of Goddard College
- In office 2018–2021
- Succeeded by: Dan Hocoy, PhD

Personal details
- Born: Bernard Dean Bull; April 20, 1971 (age 54)
- Spouse: Dr. Joyanna Bull
- Children: 2
- Education: Concordia University Wisconsin (B.A.); Concordia University Chicago (M.A.); University of Wisconsin-Milwaukee (M.L.S.); Northern Illinois University (Ed.D.)
- Profession: University administrator and author
- Awards: Wagner Distance Education Leadership Award (2012); Thirvent Fellow (2012); Jonathan D. Harber Fellow in Education and Entrepreneurship at Wesleyan University (2016)
- Religion: Lutheran Church--Missouri Synod

Bernard D. Bull (born 1971) is an American academic administrator and scholar. He is currently serving as president of Concordia University Nebraska. Bull previously served as president of Goddard College in Plainfield, Vermont.

== Biography ==
After serving for twelve years in Lutheran middle and high schools in Illinois and Wisconsin, Bull began his higher education career in 2006 at Concordia University Wisconsin, serving as a professor of education, Chief Innovation Officer, and Vice Provost of Curriculum and Academic Innovation.

In 2012, he was named a Thrivent Fellow, a fellowship dedicated to equipping current and emerging higher education leaders. That same year, he was granted the Wagner Distance Education Award.

In 2016, Bull became the Jonathan D. Harber Fellow in Education and Entrepreneurship at Wesleyan University in Middletown, Connecticut, where he taught Social Entrepreneurship in Education and during which he completed the manuscript for Adventures in Self-Directed Learning.

In 2018, Bull became president of Goddard College, a low-residency alternative and experimental college. Bull accepted the job months after it was placed on probation by the New England Commission of Higher Education over concerns regarding institutional resources and organization and governance, with growing questions about whether the college would survive. In September, 2020, Goddard was removed from probation and its accreditation was renewed.

On December 1, 2020, Concordia University Nebraska announced Bull as the president-elect, scheduled to transition from Goddard College to Concordia University Nebraska in August 2021.

Bull's writing and scholarship focuses on educational innovation, contemporary issues in education, futures in education, and religious education.

== Education ==
Bull attended Metro East Lutheran High School in Edwardsville, Illinois. He went on to earn a Bachelor of Arts in history and education from Concordia University Wisconsin in 1993. He completed a Master of Arts in Curriculum and Instruction from Concordia University Chicago, a Master of Liberal Studies from the University of Wisconsin-Milwaukee, and a Doctorate of Education in instructional technology from Northern Illinois University.

== Bibliography ==
=== As author ===
- Missional Moonshots: Insight and Inspiration in Educational Innovation. Greenwood, WI: Athanatos Publishing Group, 2016.
- What Really Matters?: Ten Critical Issues in Contemporary Education. Eugene, OR: Wipf and Stock, 2016.
- Adventures in Self-Directed Learning: A Guide for Nurturing Learner Agency and Ownership. Eugene, OR: Wipf and Stock, 2017.
- Digitized: Spiritual Implications of Technology. St. Louis: MO: Concordia Publishing House, 2018.
- Imagine the Possibilities: Conversations on the Future of Christian Education with James Pingel. St. Louis: MO: Concordia Publishing House, 2018.
- Prep Talks: Tales of Challenges & Opportunities in Christian Education with James Pingel and Michael Uden. St. Louis: MO: Concordia Publishing House, 2019.
- Breathe: A Vision & Framework for Human-Centered Learning Environments. Mequon, WI: Birdhouse Learning Labs, 2020.
- Faithful and Flourishing: Strategies for Leading Your Christian School with Excellence. St. Louis: MO: Concordia Publishing House, 2025.

=== As editor ===
- The Pedagogy of Faith: Essays on Lutheran Education. St. Louis: MO: Concordia Publishing House, 2016.

=== As contributor ===
- Entries on andragogy, connectivism, constructivism, discipleship in the digital age, gaming, heutagogy, and pedagogy. Encyclopedia of Christian Education (edited by George T. Kurian and Mark A. Lamport). Lanham, Maryland: Rowman and Littlefield, 2015.
- Entries on virtual high schools, digital badges, cyberculture, charter schools, alternative assessment, the credit hour, and homeschooling. The Sage Encyclopedia of Online Learning (edited by Steven L. Danver). Los Angeles, CA: Sage Publications, 2016.
- "Embracing Opportunities for Self-Directed Learning in Formal Learning Organizations." In Experiences in Self-Determined Learning (edited by L.M. Blaschke, C. Kenyon, and S. Hase). Sydney: Bloomsbury Academics, 2014.
