= National Biodiesel Board =

Clean Fuels Alliance America (CFAA), formerly known as the National Biodiesel Board, is an American commercial trade association representing the biodiesel industry as the unifying and coordinating body for research and development in the United States. Its mission is to advance the interests of members by creating sustainable biodiesel industry growth. CFAA works to remove barriers to the industry and educate the public about biodiesel. It offers regulatory, technical, communications, education, and petroleum outreach programs.

Biodiesel is a fuel composed of mono-alkyl esters of long-chain fatty acids derived from vegetable oils or animal fats, designated B100, and meeting the requirements of American Society for Testing and Materials (ASTM International) D6751.

== Membership ==
CFAA promotes the common business interests of those seeking to advance the use of biodiesel as a fuel or fuel additive that meets ASTM standards. Members are state, national, and international feedstock and feedstock processor organizations, biodiesel suppliers, fuel marketers and distributors, and technology providers.

== Structure ==
The governing board is made up of 15 directors elected by voting members. Seven of the directors are elected by weighted votes. The remaining eight are elected by straight votes – two are feedstock producer organization voting delegates who are actively engaged in farming; two are voting delegates of producer or marketer members who are members of either the National Renderer’s Association or the Fats and Proteins Research Foundation (FPRF); and four are voting delegates of producer or marketer members and/or feedstock producer members who are not members of the National Renderer’s Association or FPRF.

== History ==
CFAA was founded in 1992 by state soybean commodity groups. Originally known as the National Soy Diesel Development Board and later as the National Biodiesel Board, it was created by farmers who saw a real potential for biodiesel made from soybean oil. (Soybean oil is a byproduct of harvesting and processing soybeans for protein, for both human and animal consumption.) The commodity groups funded important biodiesel research and development programs focusing on soybean oil as the primary feedstock source for biodiesel. Feedstock is whatever the main ingredient of a biodiesel is. While the majority of today's biodiesel is still made from soybean oil, over the years, new feedstocks have emerged.

Today, feedstocks range from camelina, cottonseed, and canola oil to restaurant trap grease, recycled cooking oil and beef tallow. Additional research may someday develop algae and other high-oil sources into commercially viable options. Consequently, CFAA has evolved into a feedstock-neutral industry association – a move voted for by the organization’s farmer members. Access to economical feedstock sources remains a focal point for the industry, and CFAA continues to be a strong advocate in Washington, D.C. for increased investment in feedstock research.

== Advocacy ==
Although its headquarters are located in Jefferson City, Missouri, CFAA has a federal affairs office in Washington, D.C. This advocacy arm of the organization engages in critical federal policy efforts on behalf of the industry, such as the biodiesel tax incentive and Renewable Fuels Standard, which requires modest amounts of biomass-based diesel to be blended into the nation’s diesel supply. CFAA’s regulatory team monitors and analyzes both the regulatory and legislative landscapes of the biodiesel industry – identifying barriers and opportunities to expand the use of biodiesel.

The state regulatory team tracks an average of 300 pieces of legislation nationwide. The team provides access to bills through a members-only website and updates members with regular communications summarizing current events, specific legislation, passed legislation, new incentives, and regulatory developments.

== Key areas of support ==
=== Fuel quality ===
Ensuring consumers have a high level of confidence in the biodiesel they purchase is a top priority for CFAA and a key element in the industry's growth. Regulation of fuel standards is a function primarily left to the states, but regulation of biodiesel is not uniform across all states. CFAA works with states on fuel quality enforcement measures. CFAA also catalogs information regarding their authority to regulate fuels; their status in adopting ASTM D6751 as the fuel specification for biodiesel; enforcement procedures; and assessment of capacity to analyze samples.

CFAA administers a cooperative and voluntary program for the accreditation of producers and marketers of biodiesel fuel called BQ-9000. The program is a unique combination of the ASTM standard for biodiesel, ASTM D6751, and a quality systems program, which includes storage, sampling, testing, blending, shipping, distribution, and fuel management practices. BQ-9000 is open to any biodiesel manufacturer, marketer, or distributor of biodiesel and biodiesel blends in the U.S. and Canada. Companies must pass a rigorous review and inspection of their quality control processes by an independent auditor. The National Biodiesel Accreditation Commission (NBAC) issues a “BQ-9000 producer” or “BQ-9000 Marketer” seal of approval for those who pass.

=== Sustainability ===
CFAA membership adopted the following sustainability principles to guide the industry:

- Biodiesel production shall follow all applicable laws of the jurisdiction in which it is produced.
- Biodiesel projects shall be developed and operated under appropriate, transparent, and participatory processes that involve all relevant stakeholders.
- Biodiesel shall contribute to climate change mitigation by significantly reducing lifecycle greenhouse gas emissions as compared to fossil fuels. Producers shall strive to continuously improve that reduction.
- Biodiesel production shall support human rights and labor rights, and shall ensure safe and decent working conditions.
- Biodiesel production shall contribute to the social and economic development of local communities.
- Biodiesel production shall strive to improve food security.
- Throughout the supply chain, the biodiesel industry shall implement management systems that maintain and strive to improve biodiversity, areas of High Conservation Value, and the quality of natural resources such as soil, air, and water.
- Biodiesel production shall respect natural resource rights, such as land and water rights.
- All participants throughout biodiesel supply chain shall be dedicated to the ideal of continuous improvement. Members shall, through ongoing efforts, make advancements in the economic, social and environmental performance of the industry.

=== Original Equipment Manufacturer (OEM) advancement ===
CFAA developed an OEM education and outreach program to foster OEM understanding, technical research, acceptance and promotion of biodiesel. All diesel engine manufacturing companies warrant the engines they make for “materials and workmanship.” While most companies recommend a particular type of fuel in the owner's manual, engine manufacturers do not warrant fuel, including regular diesel.

Many companies have stated formally that the use of blends up to B20 (20 percent biodiesel, 80 percent diesel) will not void their parts and workmanship warranties. All U.S. OEMs approve of at least B5, and more than 54 percent support B20 or higher blends in at least some of their models.

Driven by new engine emissions requirements, which take effect on January 1, 2010, many engine manufacturers have completely redesigned their diesel engines for compliance.

== Annual conference ==
Each February, CFAA holds its annual Clean Fuels Conference. The event provides educational tracks for all biodiesel stakeholders – state, national, and international feedstock and feedstock processor organizations, biodiesel suppliers, fuel marketers and distributors, and technology providers – as well as networking opportunities, industry updates, and access to government leaders. The conference has been going green for many years with the help of zero waste event producers The Spitfire Agency.

== The Clean Fuels Foundation ==
The Clean Fuels Foundation (CFF), formerly known as the National Biodiesel Foundation, was organized in 1994 to support and promote outreach, education, science, and demonstration activities for the advancement of biodiesel and its co-products to improve national security, air quality, and the environment. Project funding is provided through government grants, charitable organizations, and corporate and individual donations.

== Headquarters ==
The CFAA is headquartered in Jefferson City, Missouri in a “recycled” building, which was renovated from the ground up with eco-conscious features. These include carpet made from recycled materials, high efficiency plumbing and appliances, skylights, automated office lights, non-toxic paint, and solar-powered parking lot lights. The building also has many green technological capabilities, such as worldwide videoconferencing, which reduces the need for travel.
