= Tony Harper (American football) =

American football coach

Biographical details
- Education: Doane (BA, 1997); Concordia (IL) (MA, 1999)

Coaching career (HC unless noted)
- 1994–1996: Doane (SA)
- 1997–1999: Concordia (IL) (RB)
- 2000: Missouri Valley (QB)
- 2001: Dakota Wesleyan (DC)
- 2002–2004: Dakota Wesleyan
- 2005: Dana (STC/DB)
- 2006–2010: Hastings (DC)
- 2011–2020: Hastings
- 2021-2021: Grand Island Northwest HS (NE) (DC)

Head coaching record
- Overall: 53-81

Tony Harper is an American football coach. He served as the head football coach at Dakota Wesleyan University in Mitchell, South Dakota from 2002 to 2004 Hastings College in Hastings, Nebraska from 2011 to 2020. Harper was the defensive coordinator at Hastings from 2006 to 2010.

After Hastings parted ways with Harper following the 2020 season, he joined the staff at Grand Island Northwest High School in Grand Island, Nebraska as the defensive coordinator. In Spring of 2023 Harper joined Albertville High School (AL) staff as a Physical Education teacher and defensive coordinator for Albertville Aggie Football.

== Head coaching record ==
Year	Team	Overall	Conference	Standing	Bowl/playoffs
Dakota Wesleyan Tigers (Great Plains Athletic Conference) (2002–2004)
2002	Dakota Wesleyan	3–7			
2003	Dakota Wesleyan	5–6			
2004	Dakota Wesleyan	1–10			
Dakota Wesleyan:		9–23			
Hastings Broncos (Great Plains Athletic Conference) (2011–2020)
2011	Hastings	6–4	5–4	T–4th	
2012	Hastings	6–4	5–4	T–4th	
2013	Hastings	3–7	2–7	9th	
2014	Hastings	6–4	5–4	T–4th	
2015	Hastings	5–5	4–5	6th	
2016	Hastings	4–7	1–7	8th	
2017	Hastings	5–6	2–6	8th	
2018	Hastings	5–6	3–6	7th	
2019	Hastings	2–8	1–8	10th	
2020–21	Hastings	2–7	2–7	8th	
Hastings:		44–58	30–58		
Total:		53–81			
