= Brian Mueller =

American academic and university administrator

Brian E. Mueller
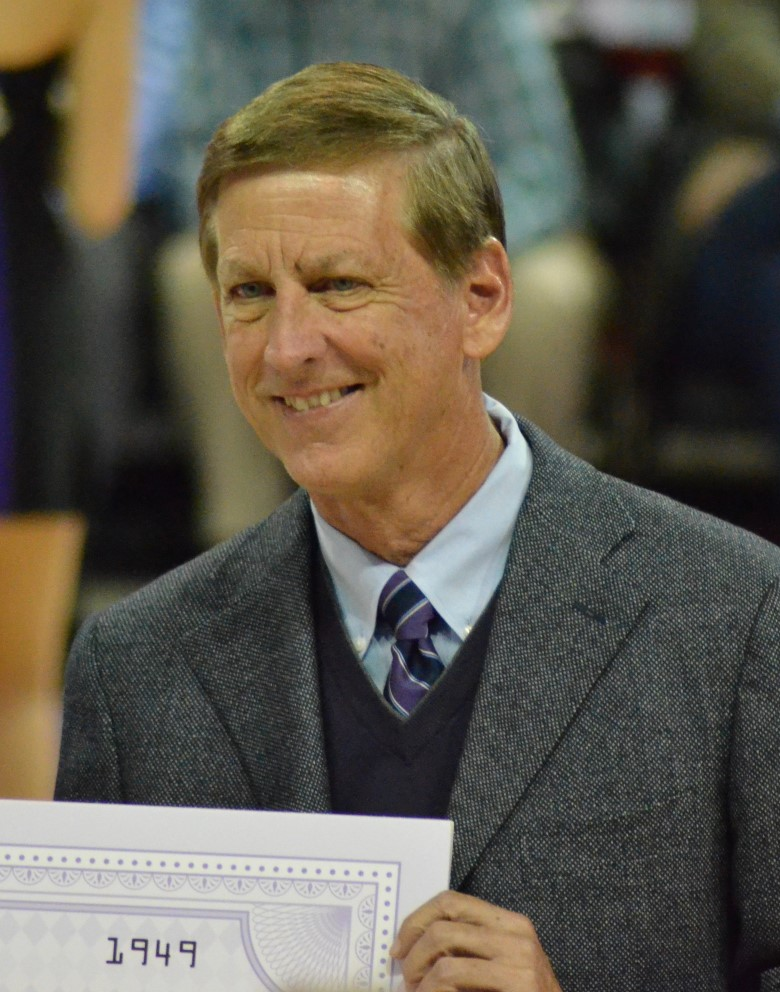
- Mueller in 2015

President of Grand Canyon University
- In office July 1, 2008 – present
- Preceded by: Kathleen Player

Personal details
- Spouse: Paula Mueller
- Education: Concordia University (BA, MEd)
- Salary: $621,000; total annual compensation $3,161,128 (2013)
- Website: gcu.edu

Brian E. Mueller is an American academic and university administrator. He is the current president of Grand Canyon University and CEO of Grand Canyon Education. Mueller has been the President of the university since July 1, 2008, and a director since March 2009. Mueller is also the CEO of the for-profit publicly traded Grand Canyon Education Inc that provides services to GCU.

Prior to taking the reins of Grand Canyon University, Mueller was the president and a director of Apollo Education Group, the parent company of the University of Phoenix. Mueller also held executive positions with the University of Phoenix Online including CEO, chief operating officer, and senior vice president. While in a leadership position, enrollment at the University of Phoenix grew from 3,500 to 340,000.

== Personal ==
Mueller grew up in a middle-class family in Wisconsin with seven siblings. Mueller graduated from Concordia University with a bachelor's degree in secondary education and a master's degree in education.

== Career ==
Mueller's first job in higher education was at his alma mater, Concordia University. He was a professor at the university from 1983 to 1987 as well as the university's head men's basketball coach.

Mueller was a high school teacher before heading to Arizona State University to enroll in a Ph.D. program, but got a job working for the University of Phoenix as an enrollment counselor in hopes to better support his family financially. Three years later, he was put in charge of marketing and enrollment. At the University of Phoenix he rose to a leadership role, as president, his team designed what the department of Education later termed as "predatory".

Mueller was hired in 2008 at Grand Canyon University when the university went to the public market for an infusion of capital investment to put towards the West Phoenix campus. Under Mueller's watch, the university's ground campus enrollment has jumped from about 1,000 to over 20,000 as of the fall of 2018. Enrollment in online programs is over 70,000. Mueller's goal for the ground campus is to increase enrollment to 25,000 and continue to expand the campus.

Mueller finished fourth in the Phoenix Business Journal's 2014 Businessman of the Year voting behind Michael Bidwill (Arizona Cardinals), MaryAnn Guerra (BioAccel), and Bob Parsons (GoDaddy).

In December 2023, the Federal Trade Commission (FTC) filed suit against Mueller, along with Grand Canyon Education and Grand Canyon University, for deceiving prospective doctoral students about the cost of its doctoral programs and its nonprofit tax status, claiming that only that only "2 percent of doctoral program graduates complete their program for the cost that Grand Canyon advertises". The FTC dropped its lawsuit in August 2025.
