= Concordia University Chicago =

Lutheran university in River Forest, Illinois, US

- Other names: CUC, Concordia-Chicago, CUChicago
- Former name: List: Addison Teachers Seminary (1864–1913); Concordia Teachers College (1913–1979); Concordia College (1979–1990); Concordia University River Forest (1990–2006)
- Motto: You shall know the Truth and the Truth shall make you free
- Type: Private university
- Established: September 1, 1864; 162 years ago
- Parent institution: Concordia University System
- Religious affiliation: Lutheran Church–Missouri Synod
- Endowment: $28,476,305 (2026)
- President: Russell P. Dawn
- Faculty: 97 full-time faculty
- Students: 6,205
- Undergraduates: 1,588
- Postgraduates: 4,617
- Location: River Forest, Illinois, U.S. 41.89967°N 87.80954°W
- Campus: Suburban, 40 acres (0.16 km^{2})
- Colors: Maroon and gold
- Sporting affiliations: Northern Athletics Conference, NCAA Division III
- Mascot: Charlie T. Cougar
- Website: cuchicago.edu
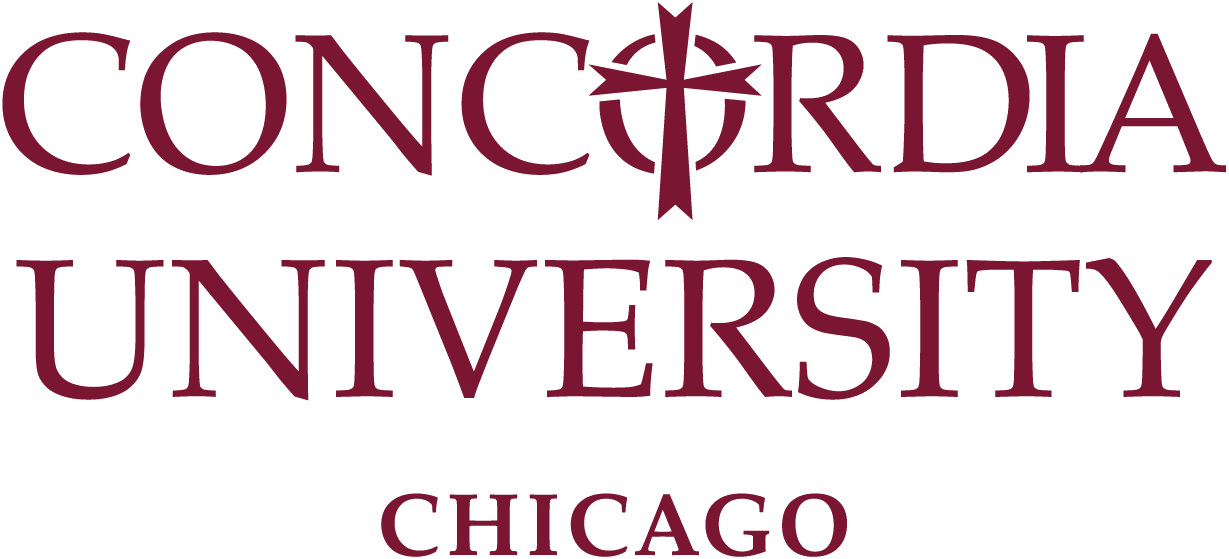

Concordia University Chicago is a private university in River Forest, Illinois, United States. Formerly a college exclusively for educating teachers for parochial schools, Concordia-Chicago now offers more than 100 undergraduate and graduate degree programs and enrolls more than 5,000 students. The university is a member of the Concordia University System, a nationwide network of colleges and universities affiliated with the Lutheran Church–Missouri Synod (LCMS).

Concordia Chicago, originally named Addison Teachers Seminary, was founded in the Lutheran tradition by German immigrants in 1864. The university continues to maintain strong ties to its faith-based heritage.

== History ==
=== Background ===
Lutheran teacher training in the United States began in Perry County, Missouri; Fort Wayne, Indiana; and Milwaukee, Wisconsin, in 1839, 1846, and 1855 respectively. In 1857, the responsibility for the operation of the teachers seminary in Milwaukee was given to the LCMS. Subsequently, the Milwaukee teachers seminary moved and merged operations with Fort Wayne's uniting it with the theological seminary that had been founded there by followers of Johann Konrad Wilhelm Löhe.

In October 1863, the LCMS in convention voted unanimously to move the teachers seminary to Addison, Illinois, appointed the first Praeses of the institution, and instructed that a new building be constructed on land donated by a local Lutheran congregation.

=== Founding and Addison campus ===
Concordia University Chicago marks 1864 as its founding in Addison, Illinois. Originally called Addison Teachers Seminary, the institution is the oldest in the Concordia University System. The West District School Society (today's St. Paul Lutheran Church) sold 6 acres (2.4 ha) to the college for the nominal amount of $10 in November 1863, and construction began on a new facility, with the cornerstone-laying service on June 15, 1864. Zion Lutheran Church donated $3,128 towards construction. The Civil War impeded construction, so a vacant nearby two-story tavern building was rented to ensure the new teachers' seminary could carry out its educational training as scheduled, beginning September 1, 1864. Forty-three men and boys, aged 14 to 33, were in attendance the first year.

The first building, a three-story structure designed for 60 students, was dedicated on December 28, 1864. Enrollment grew to 110 in 1874 and to 240 in 1885, requiring additional construction. A north wing to the main building opened in 1868, a south wing in 1875, and a separate lecture hall called New Hall in 1885. The Commons Building, containing the dining room, kitchen, and bakery, opened behind the main building in 1886, and the physical education building, called Turnen Hall, opened in 1895. The faculty grew from two in 1864 to nine in 1906, housed in nine faculty residences on the campus. The college acquired additional acreage over time, eventually giving it a campus of 28 acres (11 ha).

A large celebration was held when the final Addison class graduated in June 1913. The campus was purchased in 1914 by the Chicago City Mission Society and became the Addison Manual Training School for Boys and the Industrial School for Girls. In 1924, the original buildings were demolished and replaced by a larger facility. When alumni learned of the planned demolition, they retrieved the cornerstone, 75 stone window sills, the stone steps of the north wing, and the stone slab over the entrance of Old Main on the site of the seminary and constructed a monument. The monument was dedicated in 1925 and refurbished in 1982.

=== River Forest campus ===
On November 12, 1912, ground was broken for a new campus in River Forest, Illinois. More than 8,000 people attended the cornerstone laying service on December 15, 1912. On October 12, 1913, the institution moved to its present campus with an estimated 30,000–45,000 people attending the dedication. Prior to the dedication of the River Forest campus, much discussion took place regarding a new name for the institution. On May 20, 1913, the faculty settled on Concordia Teachers College with the official charter from the Illinois Secretary of State's office being issued on April 28, 1915.

In 1979, the institution expanded its education-centered program to become a full liberal arts institution and changed its name to Concordia College. Eleven years later, in 1990, having experienced tremendous growth in its graduate offerings, the school reorganized and changed its legal name to Concordia University. Since then the institution has branded itself as Concordia University River Forest (1990–2006) and Concordia University Chicago (2006–present).

== Colleges ==
Concordia University Chicago has four colleges:

- College of Business
- College of Education
- College of Health, Science & Technology
- College of Theology, Arts & Humanities

Many students attend classes online or at cohort sites around the Chicago metropolitan area.

== Athletics ==
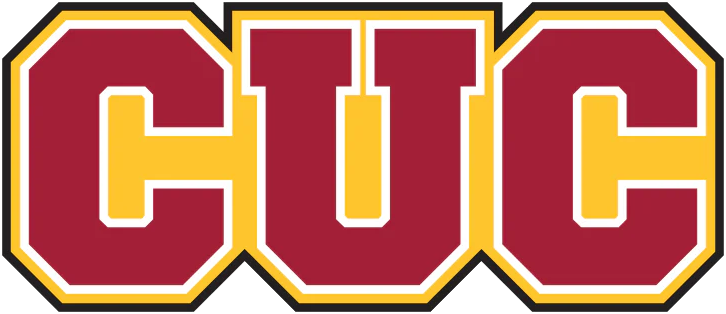
Concordia athletics logo

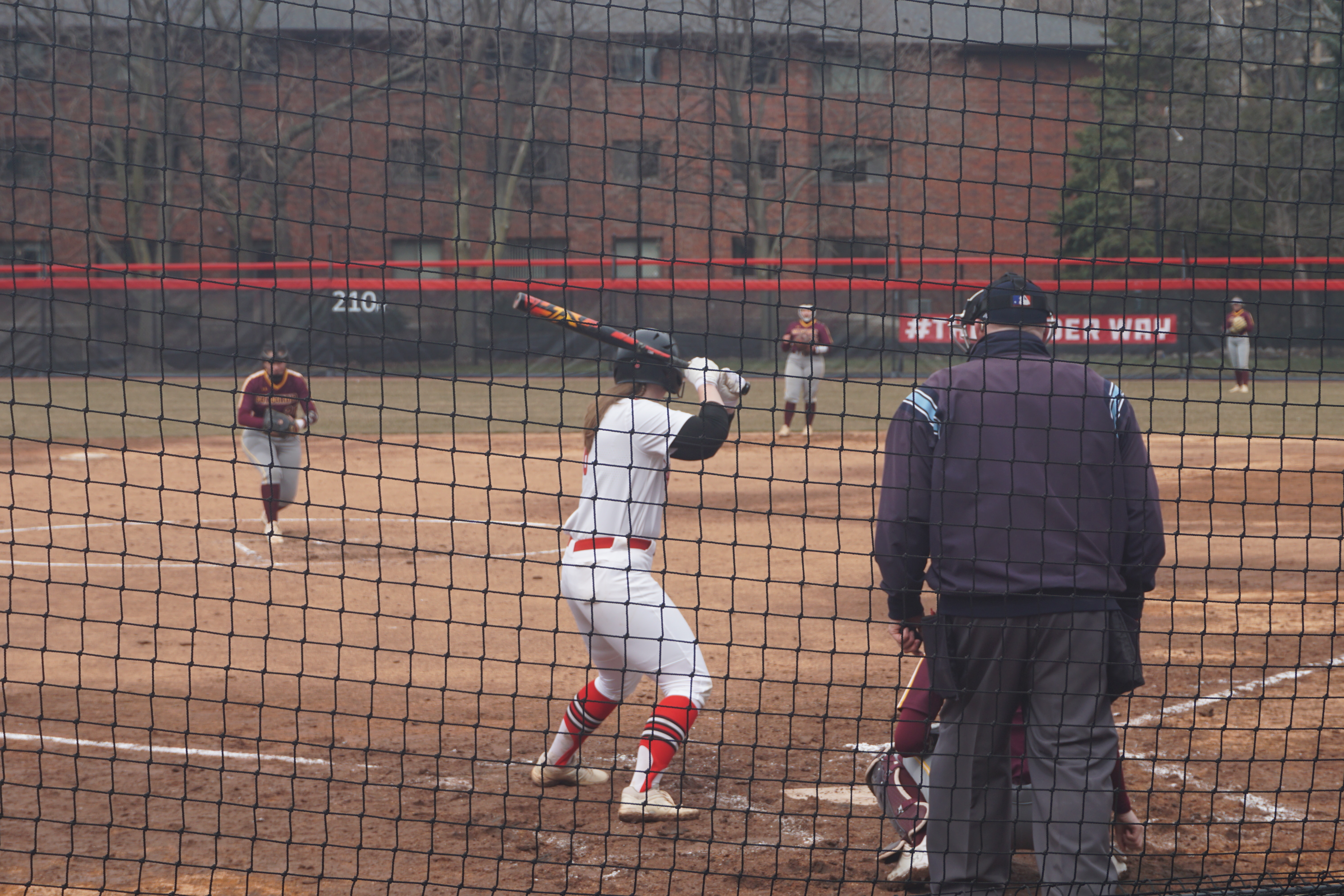
Concordia Chicago softball (in red) in action against the MSOE Raiders

Concordia Chicago teams participate as a member of the National Collegiate Athletic Association's Division III. Concordia Chicago was a member of the Northern Illinois-Iowa Conference until the spring of 2006, and since 2006 has been a member of the Northern Athletics Collegiate Conference (NACC).

Men's sports include baseball, basketball, cross country, football, soccer, tennis, and track & field; women's sports include basketball, cross country, soccer, softball, tennis, track & field, and volleyball. The school colors are maroon and gold.

== Music ==
The Wind Symphony, Concordia's premiere instrumental ensemble, has performed in 43 states, Europe, Asia, and South Africa. The group has released fourteen recordings of sacred wind music. The ensemble has given many premiere performances of compositions by current wind band composers. The Wind Symphony performed at Carnegie Hall on March 4, 2014, and again on March 13, 2019.

The Kapelle is the university's premiere choral ensemble, and has performed around the U.S. and in Europe and South America. The ensemble also has multiple recordings. Other musical ensembles include Schola Cantorum (Chapel Choir), Chamber Orchestra, Mannerchor (Men's Chamber Choir), Laudate (Women's Chamber Choir), Jazz Band, and Cougar Band (student-led pep band).

== Notable alumni ==
- Bernard Bull — academic administrator and scholar
- Adrian Griffin — professional basketball player and coach
- Tony Harper — college football coach
- Paul Walter Hauser — actor and comedian (attended 2008-2009, did not graduate)
- Richard Hillert — composer and professor of music
- Scot Kerns — Lutheran pastor and member of the Montana state legislature.
- Paul Manz — composer, organist, conductor, and professor of music
- Nick Nurse — professional basketball player and coach, author
- Jim Platt — college basketball coach
- Carl Schalk — composer and professor of music
- Mark Warkentien — professional basketball coach, recruiter, and executive
