= 2019 American Athletic Conference men's soccer season =

- League: NCAA Division I
- Sport: Soccer
- Duration: August 30, 2019 – November 5, 2019
- Teams: 8

2020 MLS SuperDraft
- Top draft pick: Garrett McLaughlin, 8th overall
- Picked by: Houston Dynamo

Regular Season
- Season champions: UCF
- Runners-up: SMU
- Season MVP: Cal Jennings

Tournament
- Champions: SMU
- Runners-up: UCF
- Finals MVP: Eddie Munjoma

AAC men's soccer seasons
- ← 2018 2020 →

2019 American Athletic Conference men's soccer standings
	Conf.					Overall
Team	W		L		T	W		L		T
No. 10 UCF +	6	–	0	–	1	15	–	3	–	2
No. 7 SMU ‡	5	–	1	–	1	18	–	2	–	1
South Florida +	4	–	3	–	0	10	–	7	–	1
Memphis	4	–	3	–	0	10	–	7	–	0
Temple	3	–	2	–	2	8	–	8	–	2
UConn	2	–	5	–	0	5	–	12	–	1
Cincinnati	1	–	5	–	1	5	–	11	–	1
Tulsa	0	–	6	–	1	4	–	9	–	2
‡ – 2019 American Tournament champion + – Invited to the 2019 NCAA tournament; As of 17 December 2019; Rankings from United Soccer Coaches

The 2019 American Athletic Conference men's soccer season was the 7th season of men's varsity soccer in the conference. The season began on August 30, 2019, and concluded on November 5, 2019. The regular season culminated with the 2019 American Athletic Conference Men's Soccer Tournament, which was held from November 9 to November 16.

The defending regular season and tournament champions, UCF and SMU, respectively, successfully defended their title. Both UCF, SMU, as well as South Florida were selected by the NCAA Selection Committee to the 2019 NCAA Division I Men's Soccer Tournament. SMU reached the quarterfinals before losing to eventual national runners-up, Virginia. UCF lost to SMU in the Sweet Sixteen, and South Florida lost to Louisville in the first round.

== Background ==
=== Previous season ===
The 2018 regular season was won by UCF, who finished conference play with a 5–1–1 record, and won on tiebreakers against SMU. SMU won the 2018 American Tournament, defeating UCF 5–4 in penalty kicks following a 1–1 draw in regulation and overtime. SMU earned the conference's automatic berth into the NCAA Tournament, while UCF and Connecticut received at-large berths into the tournament. In the NCAA Tournament, SMU lost in the first round to Oregon State. Connecticut beat rivals, Rhode Island, in the first round, before losing to Indiana in the second round. UCF was one of the 16 seeded teams (seeded 14th), allowing them to earn a bye into the second round. There, they lost in overtime to Lipscomb.

Following the season, Cal Jennings won the Offensive MVP award for the conference. Jacob Hauser-Ramsey of Connecticut won the Defensive MVP. Fellow UCF players, Louis Perez, Yannik Oettl, and Scott Calabrese won the AAC Midfielder, Goalkeeper, and Coach of the Year awards, respectively. Perez and Jennings were also named All-Americans by United Soccer Coaches.

Emil Cuello was the first AAC player to be drafted in the 2019 MLS SuperDraft, when he was selected by the LA Galaxy with the 19th overall pick in the first round of the draft.

=== Head coaches ===
Team	Head coach	Previous job	Years at school	Overall record	Record at school	American record	NCAA Tournaments	NCAA College Cups	NCAA Titles
Cincinnati	Hylton Dayes	Wright State	20	232–243–63 (.490)	134–158–43 (.464)	8–33–4 (.222)	2	0	0
UConn	Ray Reid	Southern Connecticut	23	446–130–75 (.743)	300–113–60 (.698)	29–13–11 (.651)	17	2	1
Memphis	Richard Mulrooney	Memphis (asst.)	6	32–39–15 (.459)	32–39–15 (.459)	13–24–8 (.378)	0	0	0
SMU	Kevin Hudson	SMU (asst.)	5	48–19–9 (.691)	48–19–9 (.691)	19–6–4 (.724)	3	0	0
South Florida	Bob Butehorn	Florida Gulf Coast	3	142–108–33 (.560)	13–14–6 (.485)	7–4–4 (.600)	4	0	0
Temple	Brian Rowland	Maryland (asst.)	2	5–10–4 (.368)	5–10–4 (.368)	2–4–1 (.357)	0	0	0
Tulsa	Tom McIntosh	Tulsa (asst.)	23	250–173–50 (.581)	250–173–50 (.581)	17–16–4 (.514)	10	0	0
UCF	Scott Calabrese	FIU	3	106–76–25 (.572)	21–9–5 (.671)	9–3–2 (.714)	4	0	0

== Preseason ==
=== Preseason poll ===
The preseason poll was released on August 20, 2019. UCF was picked to win the regular season.

	Team ranking	First place votes	Raw points
1.	UCF	7	49
2.	SMU	1	42
3.	UConn	0	36
4.	South Florida	0	31
5.	Temple	0	24
6.	Memphis	0	18
7.	Tulsa	0	16
8.	Cincinnati	0	8

=== Preseason national rankings ===
The preseason national rankings were announced in August 2019. United Soccer Coaches, Soccer America, and TopDrawerSoccer.com do a Top-25 preseason poll. CollegeSoccerNews.com do a Top-30 preseason poll.

	United; Soccer	CSN	Soccer; America	TopDrawer; Soccer
Cincinnati	—	—	—	—
Memphis	—	—	—	—
SMU	RV	22	RV	—
South Florida	—	—	—	—
Temple	—	—	—	—
Tulsa	—	—	—	—
UCF	15	18	13	17
UConn	RV	26	—	—

=== Preseason All-Conference teams ===
Honor	Recipient
Preseason Offensive Player of the Year	Cal Jennings, UCF
Preseason Defensive Player of the Year	Robin Lapert, UConn
Preseason Goalkeeper of the Year	Yannik Oettl, UCF

Preseason All-AAC Team

2019 AAC Men's Soccer PreSeason All-AAC Teams
First Team
- Cal Jennings – UCF
- Yannik Oettl – UCF
- Louis Perez – UCF
- Yoni Sorokin – UCF
- Dayonn Harris – UConn
- Robin Lapert – UConn
- Felix Metzler – UConn
- Ben Roberts – Memphis
- Adrian Billhardt – South Florida
- Avionne Flanagan – South Florida
- Talen Maples – SMU
- Lukas Fernandes – Temple
- Chase Bromstedt – Tulsa

== Regular season ==
=== Players of the Week ===
Week	Offensive			Defensive			Goalkeeper		Rookie		
Week	Player	Position	Team	Player	Position	Team	Player	Team	Player	Position	Team
Sep. 2	Gianluca Arcangeli	FW	UCF	Ben Roberts	DF	Memphis	Bryson Reed	Tulsa	Jovan Prado	MF	Memphis
Sep. 9	Cal Jennings	FW	UCF	Talen Maples	DF	SMU	Yannik Oettl	UCF	Kyle Healy	MF	Cincinnati
Sep. 16	Sam Ashton	FW	Memphis	Javain Brown	DF	South Florida	Harrison Devenish-Meares	South Florida	Victor Claudel	FW	South Florida
Sep. 23	Garrett McLaughlin	FW	SMU	Andres Hernandez	DF	UCF	Shane Lanson	SMU	Gino Vivi	MF	UCF
Sep. 30	Gabriel Costa	MF	SMU	Javain Brown	DF	South Florida	Harrison Devenish-Meares	South Florida	Jonas Schmalbach	MF	UCF
Oct. 7	Gabriel Costa	MF	SMU	Ben Roberts	DF	Memphis	Noah Lawrence	Cincinnati	Michael Blanke	FW	Memphis
Oct. 14	Harris Partain	MF	Tulsa	Robin Lapert	DF	UConn	Gianluca Catalano	UConn	Gino Vivi	MF	UCF
Oct. 21	Artur De Luca	FW	Memphis	Jackson Morse	DF	Memphis	Simon Lefebvre	Temple	Peter Chang	MF	Memphis
Oct. 28	Garrett McLaughlin	FW	SMU	Pierre Cayet	DF	Temple	Yannik Oettl	UCF	Mickael Borger	DF	Temple
Nov. 6	Adrian Billhardt	FW	South Florida	Javain Brown	DF	South Florida	Grant Makela	SMU	Gianluca Arcangeli	MF	UCF

== Rankings ==
=== United Soccer ===
	Improvement in ranking
	Drop in ranking
RV	Received votes but were not ranked in Top 25
NV	No votes received

	Pre	Wk 2	Wk 3	Wk 4	Wk 5	Wk 6	Wk 7	Wk 8	Wk 9	Wk 10	Wk 11	Wk 12	Final
Cincinnati	NV	NV	NV	NV	NV	NV	NV	NV	NV	NV	NV	NV	NV
Memphis	NV	NV	NV	NV	NV	NV	RV	RV	RV	RV	RV	NV	NV
SMU	RV	RV	22	8	8	4	3	3	12	12	11	5	7
South Florida	NV	NV	NV	NV	NV	NV	NV	NV	NV	NV	NV	NV	NV
Temple	NV	NV	NV	NV	NV	NV	NV	NV	NV	NV	NV	NV	NV
Tulsa	NV	NV	NV	NV	NV	NV	NV	NV	NV	NV	NV	NV	NV
UCF	15	15	16	13	12	11	9	11	8	6	6	8	10
UConn	RV	23	RV	NV	NV	NV	NV	NV	NV	NV	NV	NV	NV

=== Top Drawer Soccer ===
	Improvement in ranking
	Drop in ranking
RV	Received votes but were not ranked in Top 25
NV	No votes received

	Pre	Wk 1	Wk 2	Wk 3	Wk 4	Wk 5	Wk 6	Wk 7	Wk 8	Wk 9	Wk 10	Wk 11	Wk 12	Wk 13	Wk 14	Wk 15	Wk 16	Final
Cincinnati	NV	NV	NV	NV	NV	NV	NV	NV	NV	NV	NV	NV	NV	NV	NV	NV	NV	NV
Memphis	NV	NV	NV	NV	NV	NV	NV	NV	NV	NV	RV	RV	NV	NV	NV	NV	NV	NV
SMU	RV	RV	RV	16	9	4	2	3	4	12	11	11	11	3	3	3	5	5
South Florida	NV	NV	NV	NV	NV	NV	NV	NV	NV	NV	NV	NV	NV	NV	NV	NV	NV	NV
Temple	NV	NV	NV	NV	NV	NV	NV	NV	NV	NV	NV	NV	NV	NV	NV	NV	NV	NV
Tulsa	NV	NV	NV	NV	NV	NV	NV	NV	NV	NV	NV	NV	NV	NV	NV	NV	NV	NV
UCF	17	17	11	19	17	14	9	4	3	6	4	4	3	8	8	10	10	10
UConn	NV	NV	NV	NV	NV	NV	NV	NV	NV	NV	NV	NV	NV	NV	NV	NV	NV	NV

== Postseason ==
=== AAC Tournament ===
The 2019 Tournament will be held at the home ground of the regular season winner.

First round November 9
4	Memphis	1
5	Temple	2
3	South Florida	1
6	UConn	0

Semifinals; November 13
1	UCF	5
5	Temple	0
2	SMU (2OT)	2
3	South Florida	1

Final; November 16
1	UCF	0
2	SMU	1

=== NCAA Tournament ===
Seed	School	1st Round	2nd Round	3rd Round	Quarterfinals	Semifinals	Championship
8	SMU	BYE	W 1–0 (2OT) vs. Coastal Carolina – (Dallas, TX)	W 2–1 (OT) vs. #9 UCF – (Dallas, TX)	L 2–3 (OT) vs. #1 Virginia – (Charlottesville, VA)		
9	UCF	BYE	W 2–1 (2OT) vs. Missouri State – (Orlando, FL)	L 1–2 (OT) vs. #8 SMU – (Dallas, TX)			
None	South Florida	L 1–4 vs. Louisville– (Louisville, KY)					
	W–L–T (%):	0–1–0 (.000)	2–0–0 (1.000)	1–1–0 (.500)	0–1–0 (.000)	0–0–0 (–)	0–0–0 (–) Total: 3–3–0 (.500)

=== Postseason awards and honors ===
==== Conference honors ====
2019 AAC Men's Soccer Individual Awards
Award	Recipient(s)
Offensive Player of the Year	Cal Jennings – UCF
Midfielders of the Year	Yoni Sorokin – UCF; Gabriel Costa – SMU
Defensive Player of the Year	Eddie Munjoma – SMU
Goalkeeper of the Year	Yannik Oettl – UCF
Rookie of the Year	Gino Vivi – UCF
Coach of the Year	Scott Calabrese – UCF

2019 AAC Men's Soccer All-Conference Teams
First Team	Second Team	Rookie Team
Yannik Oettl, UCF; Cal Jennings, UCF†; Garrett McLaughlin, SMU†; Harris Partain, Tulsa; Yoni Sorokin, UCF†; Dayonn Harris, UConn; Gabriel Costa, SMU; Yanis Leerman, UCF; Javain Brown, South Florida; Avionne Flanagan, South Florida; Eddie Munjoma, South Florida; Sam Ashton, Memphis	Simon Lefebvre, Temple; Louis Perez, UCF; Donovan Segree, Cincinnati; Robin Lapert, UConn; Felix Metzler, UConn; Ben Roberts, Memphis; Gurman Sangha, Memphis; Adrian Billhardt, South Florida; Knut Ahlander, SMU; Lukas Fernandes, Temple; Pierre Cayet, Temple; Mitchell Cashion, Tulsa	Glademir Mendoza, UCF; Gino Vivi, UCF†; Mo Williams, Cincinnati; Ben Awashie, UConn; Moussa Wade, UConn†; Peter Chang, Memphis†; Ford Hunt, Memphis; Javain Brown, South Florida†; Sal Mazzaferro, South Florida; Henrik Bredeli, SMU; Sean Karani, Temple

† denotes unanimous selection

==== National honors ====
Player	Pos.	School	Honor	Ref.
Gabriel Costa	MF	SMU	TopDrawer Soccer Second-Team All-American	
Gabriel Costa	MF	SMU	Soccer America Third-Team All-American	
Gabriel Costa	MF	SMU	United Soccer Coaches Third-Team All-American	
Dayonn Harris	FW	UConn	Senior CLASS Award Senior All-American	
Cal Jennings	FW	UCF	College Soccer News First-Team All-American	
Cal Jennings	FW	UCF	CoSIDA Second-Team All-American	
Cal Jennings	FW	UCF	Senior CLASS Award Senior All-American	
Cal Jennings	FW	UCF	Soccer America First-Team All-American	
Cal Jennings	FW	UCF	TopDrawer Soccer First-Team All-American	
Cal Jennings	FW	UCF	United Soccer Coaches First-Team All-American	
Yannis Leerman	MF	UCF	TopDrawer Soccer Second-Team All-American	
Garrett McLaughlin	FW	SMU	Senior CLASS Award Senior All-American	
Eddie Munjoma	DF	SMU	United Soccer Coaches First-Team All-American	
Yoni Sorokin	MF	UCF	TopDrawer Soccer Second-Team All-American	
Gino Vivi	FW	UCF	College Soccer News First-Team Freshman All-American	
Gino Vivi	FW	UCF	TopDrawer Soccer Third-Team Freshman All-American	
Ben Wendell	MF	Cincinnati	CoSIDA Third-Team All-American	

== American vs other conferences ==
Regular Season

Conference	Record
America East	1–0–0
ACC	4–3–0
Atlantic 10	4–1–0
Atlantic Sun	9–0–0
Big East	2–7–0
Big South	1–0–0
Big Ten	0–3–1
Big West	1–0–0
Colonial	1–0–0
Conference USA	4–1–1
Horizon	2–3–0
Ivy	0–3–1
MAAC	2–0–0
Mid-American	1–2–0
Missouri Valley	2–1–0
NEC	0–1–0
Pac-12	0–0–0
Patriot	1–0–0
SoCon	1–2–0
Summit	3–0–1
Sun Belt	2–1–0
West Coast	1–0–0
WAC	3–0–0
Total Non-Conference Record	45–28–4

Post Season

Power Conferences	Record
ACC	0–2–0
American	1–1–0
Power Conferences Total	1–3–0
Other DI Conferences	Record
Missouri Valley	1–0–0
Sun Belt	1–0–0
Other DI Total	2–0–0
Total Postseason Record	3–3–0

== MLS SuperDraft ==
=== Total picks by school ===
Team	Round 1	Round 2	Round 3	Round 4	Total
Cincinnati	0	0	0	0	0
Connecticut	1	0	0	0	1
Memphis	0	0	0	0	0
SMU	1	0	0	0	1
South Florida	0	0	0	0	0
Temple	1	0	0	0	1
Tulsa	0	0	0	0	0
UCF	1	1	0	0	2

=== List of selections ===
Round	Pick #	MLS team	Player	Position	College	Ref.
1	8	Houston Dynamo	Garrett McLaughlin	FW	SMU	
1	17	FC Dallas	Cal Jennings	FW	UCF	
1	20	Real Salt Lake	Dayonn Harris	MF	UConn	
1	21	D.C. United	Simon Lefebvre	GK	Temple	
2	39	Orlando City	Jonathan Dean	DF	UCF	

=== Homegrown contracts ===
The Homegrown Player Rule is a Major League Soccer program that allows MLS teams to sign local players from their own development academies directly to MLS first team rosters. Before the creation of the rule in 2008, every player entering Major League Soccer had to be assigned through one of the existing MLS player allocation processes, such as the MLS SuperDraft.

To place a player on its homegrown player list, making him eligible to sign as a homegrown player, players must have resided in that club's home territory and participated in the club's youth development system for at least one year. Players can play college soccer and still be eligible to sign a homegrown contract.

Original MLS team	Player	Position	College	Ref.
FC Dallas	Eddie Munjoma	DF	SMU	
