= 2018 American Athletic Conference men's soccer season =

- League: NCAA Division I
- Sport: Soccer
- Duration: August 24, 2018 – November 11, 2018
- Teams: 8

2019 MLS SuperDraft
- Top draft pick: Emil Cuello, 19th overall
- Picked by: LA Galaxy

Regular Season
- Season champions: UCF
- Runners-up: SMU

Tournament
- Champions: SMU
- Runners-up: UCF
- Finals MVP: Offensive: Emil Cuello; Defensive: Grant Makela

AAC men's soccer seasons
- ← 2017 2019 →

2018 American Athletic Conference men's soccer standings
	Conf.					Overall
Team	W		L		T	W		L		T
No. 18 UCF +	5	–	1	–	1	13	–	3	–	3
SMU ‡+	5	–	1	–	1	10	–	5	–	3
South Florida	4	–	1	–	2	7	–	8	–	2
Connecticut +	3	–	2	–	2	12	–	6	–	2
Memphis	2	–	4	–	1	8	–	7	–	4
Temple	2	–	4	–	1	5	–	10	–	4
Tulsa	2	–	5	–	0	6	–	9	–	2
Cincinnati	1	–	6	–	0	3	–	14	–	1
‡ – 2018 American Tournament champion + – Invited to the 2018 NCAA Division I Men's Soccer Championship; As of December 11, 2018; Rankings from United Soccer Coaches

The 2018 American Athletic Conference men's soccer season was the 6th season of men's varsity soccer in the conference. The season began on August 24 and concluded on November 11, 2018.

The regular season was won by UCF, who finished conference play with a 5–1–1 record, and won on tiebreakers against SMU. SMU won the American Tournament, defeating UCF 5–4 in penalty kicks following a 1–1 draw in regulation and overtime. SMU earned the conference's automatic berth into the NCAA Tournament, while UCF and Connecticut received at-large berths into the tournament. In the NCAA Tournament, SMU lost in the first round to Oregon State. Connecticut beat rivals, Rhode Island, in the first round, before losing to Indiana in the second round. UCF was one of the 16 seeded teams (seeded 14th), allowing them to earn a bye into the second round. There, they lost in overtime to Lipscomb.

Following the season, Cal Jennings won the Offensive MVP award for the conference. Jacob Hauser-Ramsey of Connecticut won the Defensive MVP. Fellow UCF players, Louis Perez, Yannik Oettl, and Scott Calabrese won the AAC Midfielder, Goalkeeper, and Coach of the Year awards, respectively. Perez and Jennings were also named All-Americans by United Soccer Coaches.

Emil Cuello was the first AAC player to be drafted in the 2019 MLS SuperDraft, when he was selected by the LA Galaxy with the 19th overall pick in the first round of the draft.

== Background ==
=== Head coaches ===
Team	Head coach	Previous job	Years at school	Overall record	Record at school	American record	NCAA Tournaments	NCAA College Cups	NCAA Titles
Cincinnati	Hylton Dayes	Wright State	19	229–229–62 (.500)	131–144–42 (.479)	7–27–4 (.237)	2	0	0
Connecticut	Ray Reid	Southern Connecticut	22	434–124–73 (.746)	288–107–58 (.700)	26–11–9 (.663)	16	2	1
Memphis	Richard Mulrooney	Memphis (asst.)	5	24–32–11 (.440)	24–32–11 (.440)	11–20–7 (.382)	0	0	0
SMU	Kevin Hudson	SMU (asst.)	4	38–14–6 (.707)	38–14–6 (.707)	14–5–3 (.705)	2	0	0
South Florida	Bob Butehorn	Florida Gulf Coast	2	135–100–31 (.566)	6–6–4 (.500)	3–3–2 (.500)	4	0	0
Temple	Dave MacWilliams	Philadelphia KiXX	19	140–161–34 (.469)	140–161–34 (.469)	12–19–7 (.408)	3	0	0
Tulsa	Tom McIntosh	Tulsa (asst.)	22	244–164–48 (.588)	244–164–48 (.588)	15–11–4 (.567)	10	0	0
UCF	Scott Calabrese	FIU	2	93–73–22 (.553)	8–6–2 (.563)	4–2–1 (.643)	3	0	0

== Preseason ==
=== Preseason poll ===
The preseason poll will be released on August 14, 2018. UCF was picked to win the regular season.

	Team ranking	First place votes	Raw points
1.	UCF	4	46
2.	SMU	3	43
3.	Connecticut	1	38
4.	South Florida	0	34
5.	Tulsa	0	26
6.	Temple	0	19
7.	Cincinnati	0	11
8.	Memphis	0	9

=== Preseason national rankings ===
Two of the programs were ranked in one of the five major preseason polls. CollegeSoccerNews.com and Hero Sports use a Top 30 ranking throughout the season, while United Soccer, Soccer America, and Top Drawer Soccer use a Top 25 ranking throughout the season.

	United; Soccer	CSN	Hero; Sports	Soccer; America	TopDrawer; Soccer
Cincinnati	NR	NR	NR	NR	NR
Connecticut	NR	NR	NR	NR	NR
Memphis	NR	NR	NR	NR	NR
SMU	8	10	6	7	6
South Florida	NR	NR	NR	NR	NR
Temple	NR	NR	NR	NR	NR
Tulsa	NR	NR	NR	NR	NR
UCF	NR	NR	26	NR	NR

=== Preseason All-Conference teams ===
Honor	Recipient
Preseason Offensive Player of the Year	Garrett McLaughlin, SMU
Preseason Defensive Player of the Year	Jacob Hauser-Ramsey, Connecticut
Preseason Goalkeeper of the Year	Christian Knight, South Florida

Preseason All-AAC Team

Note: Flags indicate national team as defined under FIFA eligibility rules; some limited exceptions apply. Players may hold more than one non-FIFA nationality.

No.	Pos.	Nation	Player
—	GK	USA	Christian Knight (South Florida)
—	DF	NOR	Andreas Steineger (UCF)
—	DF	USA	Dylan Greenberg (Connecticut)
—	DF	USA	Jacob Hauser-Ramsey (Connecticut)
—	DF	ENG	Ben Roberts (Memphis)
—	MF	ISR	Yoni Sorokin (UCF)
—	MF	VEN	David Zalzman (Memphis)

No.	Pos.	Nation	Player
—	MF	GER	Adrian Billhardt (South Florida)
—	MF	USA	Emil Cuello (SMU)
—	FW	USA	Cal Jennings (UCF)
—	FW	USA	Austin Smythe (Cincinnati)
—	FW	SEN	Abdou Thiam (Connecticut)
—	FW	USA	Garrett McLaughlin (SMU)

== Regular season ==
=== Players of the Week ===
Week	Offensive			Defensive			Goalkeeper		Rookie		
Week	Player	Position	Team	Player	Position	Team	Player	Team	Player	Position	Team
Aug. 26	Louis Perez	MF	UCF	Mitchell Cashion	DF	Tulsa	Cooper Clark	Tulsa	Felix Metzler	DF	Connecticut
Sep. 2	Cal Jennings	FW	UCF	Pierre Cayet	DF	Temple	Harrison Devenish-Meares	South Florida	Gilles Kuhler	FW	Tulsa
Sep. 9	Tomasz Skublak	FW	UCF	Koray Easterling	DF	Tulsa	Yannik Oettl	UCF	Jalen Campbell	FW	Temple
Sep. 16	Cal Jennings	FW	UCF	Jacob Hauser-Ramsey	DF	Connecticut	Tyler Hofmann	Memphis	none announced		
Sep. 23	Lukas Fernandes	MF	Temple	Talen Maples	DF	SMU	Simon Lefebvre	Temple	Lane Warrington	MF	SMU
Sep. 30	Rex Epps	FW	Cincinnati	Jacob Hauser-Ramsey	DF	Connecticut	Yannik Oettl	UCF	Ibrahima Diop	FW	Connecticut
Oct. 7	Cal Jennings	FW	UCF	Jacob Hauser-Ramsey	DF	Connecticut	Harrison Devenish-Meares	South Florida	Edgar Alaniz	MF	Memphis
Oct. 14	Tomasz Skublak	FW	South Florida	Jacob Hauser-Ramsey	DF	Connecticut	Grant Makela	SMU	Gilles Kuhler	FW	Tulsa
Oct. 21	Abdou Mbacke Thiam	FW	Connecticut	Ben Roberts	DF	Memphis	Yannik Oettl	UCF	Gurman Sangha	MF	Memphis
Oct. 28	Lukas Fernandes	MF	Temple	Philip Ponder	DF	SMU	Simon Lefebvre	Temple	Thomas Haney	DF	SMU
Nov. 4	Louis Perez	MF	UCF	Philip Ponder	DF	SMU	Noah Lawrence	Cincinnati	Emilio Ycaza	MF	South Florida

== Rankings ==
=== United Soccer ===
	Improvement in ranking
	Drop in ranking
RV	Received votes but were not ranked in Top 25
NV	No votes received

	Pre	Wk 1	Wk 2	Wk 3	Wk 4	Wk 5	Wk 6	Wk 7	Wk 8	Wk 9	Wk 10	Wk 11	Wk 12	Final
Cincinnati	NV	NV	NV	NV	NV	NV	NV	NV	NV	NV	NV	NV	NV	NV
Connecticut	RV	18	NV	NV	RV	NV	RV	20	20	15	20	RV	RV	RV
Memphis	NV	NV	NV	NV	NV	NV	NV	NV	NV	NV	NV	NV	NV	NV
SMU	8	RV	RV	NV	NV	NV	NV	NV	NV	NV	NV	RV	RV	RV
South Florida	RV	NV	NV	NV	NV	NV	NV	NV	NV	NV	NV	NV	NV	NV
Temple	NV	NV	NV	NV	NV	NV	NV	NV	NV	NV	NV	NV	NV	NV
Tulsa	NV	23	NV	NV	NV	NV	NV	NV	NV	NV	NV	NV	NV	NV
UCF	RV	RV	NV	RV	RV	RV	RV	19	19	13	9	7	9	18

=== Top Drawer Soccer ===
	Improvement in ranking
	Drop in ranking
RV	Received votes but were not ranked in Top 25
NV	No votes received

	Pre	Wk 1	Wk 2	Wk 3	Wk 4	Wk 5	Wk 6	Wk 7	Wk 8	Wk 9	Wk 10	Wk 11	Wk 12	Wk 13	Wk 14	Wk 15	Wk 16	Final
Cincinnati	NV	NV	NV	NV	NV	NV	NV	NV	NV	NV	NV	NV	NV	NV	NV	NV	NV	NV
Connecticut	NV	NV	NV	NV	NV	NV	NV	24	12	13	8	20	NV	NV	25	25	25	25
Memphis	NV	NV	NV	NV	NV	NV	NV	NV	NV	NV	NV	NV	NV	NV	NV	NV	NV	NV
SMU	6	6	NV	NV	NV	NV	NV	NV	NV	NV	NV	NV	NV	24	NV	NV	NV	NV
South Florida	NV	NV	NV	NV	NV	NV	NV	NV	NV	NV	NV	NV	NV	NV	NV	NV	NV	NV
Temple	NV	NV	NV	NV	NV	NV	NV	NV	NV	NV	NV	NV	NV	NV	NV	NV	NV	NV
Tulsa	NV	NV	15	NV	NV	NV	NV	NV	NV	NV	NV	NV	NV	NV	NV	NV	NV	NV
UCF	NV	NV	NV	NV	NV	NV	NV	NV	NV	24	9	6	6	13	RV	RV	RV	RV

== Postseason ==
=== AAC Tournament ===
The 2018 Tournament will be held at the home ground of the regular season winner.

First round Nov. 6
4	Connecticut	3
5	Temple	1
3	South Florida	1
6	Memphis	3

Semifinals; Nov. 8
1	UCF (2OT)	3
4	Connecticut	2
2	SMU (OT)	2
6	Memphis	1

Final; Nov. 10
1	UCF	1 (4)
2	SMU (pen.)	1 (5)

=== NCAA Tournament ===
Seed	Region	School	1st Round	2nd Round	3rd Round	Quarterfinals	Semifinals	Championship
14	3	UCF	BYE	L 0–1 (OT) vs. Lipscomb – (Orlando, FL)				
None	1	SMU	L 1–2 vs. Oregon State – (Corvallis, OR)					
None	4	Connecticut	W 4–3 vs. Rhode Island – (Storrs, CT)	L 0–4 vs. #2 Indiana – (Bloomington, IN)				
		W–L (%):	1–1–0 (.500)	0–2–0 (.000)	0–0–0 (–)	0–0–0 (–)	0–0–0 (–)	0–0–0 (–) Total: 1–3–0 (.250)

=== Postseason awards and honors ===
==== Conference honors ====
2018 AAC Men's Soccer Individual Awards
Award	Recipient(s)
Offensive Player of the Year	Cal Jennings, UCF
Midfielder of the Year	Louis Perez, UCF
Defensive Player of the Year	Jacob Hauser-Ramsey, Connecticut
Goalkeeper of the Year	Yannik Oettl, UCF
Rookie of the Year	Felix Metzler, Connecticut
Coach of the Year	Scott Calabrese, UCF
Team Fair Play Award	Connecticut

2018 AAC Men's Soccer All-Conference Teams
First Team	Second Team	Rookie Team
Goalkeeper Yannik Oettl, So., UCF Defenders Jacob Hauser-Ramsey, Sr., UConn†; Talen Maples, So., SMU; Ben Roberts, Jr., Memphis Midfielders Louis Perez, So., UCF†; Yoni Sorokin, So., UCF; Emil Cuello, Sr., SMU; David Zalzman, Sr., M, Memphis Forwards Cal Jennings, Jr., UCF†; Abdou Mbacke Thiam, Sr., UConn†; Tomasz Skublak, Sr., USF	Goalkeeper Grant Makela, Jr., SMU Defenders Avionne Flanagan, So., USF; Dylan Greenberg, R-Sr., UConn; Robin Lapert, So., UConn; Yanis Leerman, Fr., UCF Midfielders Chase Bromstedt, So., Tulsa; Lukas Fernandes, Jr., Temple; Dayonn Harris, R-Jr., UConn; Felix Metzler, Fr., UConn; Alex Zis, Jr., USF Forwards Garrett McLaughlin, Jr., SMU; Akean Shackleford, Jr., SMU	Defenders Andres Hernandez Betancur, UCF; Henrique Gallina, USF; Yanis Leerman, UCF† Midfielders Knut Ahlander, SMU; Jalen Campbell, Temple; Andres Charles-Barrera, Temple; Felix Metzler, UConn†; Lane Warrington, SMU Forwards Ibrahima Diop, UConn; Gilles Kuhler, Tulsa†; Gurman Sangha, Memphis

† denotes unanimous selection

==== National honors ====
Player	Pos.	School	Honor	Ref.
Cal Jennings	FW	UCF	College Soccer News First-Team All-America	
Cal Jennings	FW	UCF	USC First-Team All-American	
Louis Perez	MF	UCF	USC Third-Team All-American	

== American vs other conferences ==
Regular Season

Conference	Record
ACC	1–3–1
Atlantic 10	1–2–2
Atlantic Sun	8–1–0
Big East	0–5–1
Big South	0–0–0
Big Ten	3–3–1
Big West	0–1–0
CAA	0–0–0
Conference USA	4–0–1
Horizon	2–1–0
Ivy	1–1–0
MAAC	2–0–0
Mid-American	1–3–1
Missouri Valley	0–1–3
NEC	2–0–0
Pac-12	0–0–0
Patriot	2–0–0
Southland	0–0–0
Summit	0–3–0
West Coast	1–0–0
WAC	2–2–0
Total Non-Conference Record	32–28–10

Post Season

Power Conferences	Record
Big Ten	0–1–0
Pac-12	0–1–0
Power Conferences Total	0–2–0
Other DI Conferences	Record
Atlantic 10	1–0–0
Atlantic Sun	0–1–0
Other DI Total	1–1–0
Total Postseason Record	1–3–0

== MLS SuperDraft ==
=== Total picks by school ===
Team	Round 1	Round 2	Round 3	Round 4	Total
Cincinnati	0	0	0	0	0
Connecticut	0	1	0	0	1
Memphis	0	0	0	1	1
SMU	1	0	0	0	1
South Florida	0	0	0	0	0
Temple	0	0	0	0	0
Tulsa	0	0	0	0	0
UCF	0	0	0	0	0

=== List of selections ===
Round	Pick #	MLS team	Player	Position	College	Other	Ref.
1	19	LA Galaxy	Emil Cuello	Midfielder	SMU		
2	42	Colorado Rapids	Jacob Hauser-Ramsey	Defender	Connecticut		
4	95	Portland Timbers	David Zalzman	Midfielder	Memphis		

=== Homegrown contracts ===
Original MLS team	Player	Position	College	Notes	Ref.
