= 2019 UCF Knights men's soccer team =

2019 soccer team for the University of Central Florida

2019 UCF Knights men's soccer

AAC regular season champions

NCAA Tournament, Third Round
- Conference: American Athletic Conference
- U. Soc. Coaches poll: No. 10
- TopDrawerSoccer.com: No. 10
- Record: 15–3–2 (6–0–1 American)
- Head coach: Scott Calabrese (3rd season)
- Assistant coaches: Paul Souders (4th season); Jamie Davies (2nd season)
- Captains: Cal Jennings; Richard Amon; Yannik Oettl
- Home stadium: UCF Soccer and Track Stadium

2019 American Athletic Conference men's soccer standings
	Conf.					Overall
Team	W		L		T	W		L		T
No. 10 UCF +	6	–	0	–	1	15	–	3	–	2
No. 7 SMU ‡	5	–	1	–	1	18	–	2	–	1
South Florida +	4	–	3	–	0	10	–	7	–	1
Memphis	4	–	3	–	0	10	–	7	–	0
Temple	3	–	2	–	2	8	–	8	–	2
UConn	2	–	5	–	0	5	–	12	–	1
Cincinnati	1	–	5	–	1	5	–	11	–	1
Tulsa	0	–	6	–	1	4	–	9	–	2
‡ – 2019 American Tournament champion + – Invited to the 2019 NCAA tournament; As of 17 December 2019; Rankings from United Soccer Coaches

The 2019 UCF Knights men's soccer team represented the University of Central Florida during the 2019 NCAA Division I men's soccer season and the 2019 American Athletic Conference men's soccer season. The regular season began on August 30 and concluded on November 5. It was the program's 44th season fielding a men's varsity soccer team, and their 7th season in the AAC. The 2019 season was Scott Calabrese's third year as head coach for the program.

UCF finished the season with a 15–3–2 overall record and a 6–0–1 conference record, best in the AAC. The Knights advanced to the finals of the AAC Tournament where they fell to SMU for the third consecutive year. They received an at-large bid to the NCAA Tournament and advanced to the third round where they were defeated by SMU.

== Background ==
The Knights are coming off a 13–3–3 season where they finished 5–1–1 in AAC play, earning them their first American Athletic Conference regular season title. In the 2018 American Athletic Conference Men's Soccer Tournament, UCF lost to SMU in penalty kicks, 4–5 after a 1–1 draw in regulation and extra time. UCF earned an at-large berth into the 2018 NCAA Division I Men's Soccer Tournament, where they were one of the 16 seeded teams (out of 48 teams total) given the 14 seed. It was UCF's first NCAA Tournament appearance since 2011. With the seed, they earned a bye into the second round where they hosted the winner of Washington and Lipscomb. Lipscomb beat Washington in penalties, and also ended up beating the Knights in overtime, thus ending the season for UCF.

Junior striker, Cal Jennings, lead UCF in goals and assists for 2018 and was named a consensus All-American with Top Drawer Soccer, Soccer America, United Soccer Coaches, and CollegeSoccerNews.com all naming him as a first-team All-American.

== Player movement ==
=== Departures ===
Name	Nat.	Number	Position	Height	Weight	Year	Hometown	Reason for departure
Andreas Steineger	NOR	2	DF	6 ft 4 in (1.93 m)	190	Senior	Oslo, NOR	Graduated
Zachary Waitman	USA	5	DF	5 ft 8 in (1.73 m)	165	Senior	Montverde, FL	Graduated
Jonathan Dean	USA	6	MF	5 ft 8 in (1.73 m)	155	Senior	Macon, GA	Graduated
Gorka Aperribay	USA	9	FW	6 ft 1 in (1.85 m)	185	Senior	Winter Springs, FL	Graduated
Walker Dawkins	USA	11	MF	5 ft 7 in (1.70 m)	135	RS-Senior	Royal Palm Beach, FL	Graduated
François André Dulysse	HAI	16	DF	6 ft 0 in (1.83 m)	173	Sophomore	West Palm Beach, FL	Transferred to Manhattan
C. J. Campbell	USA	17	DF	5 ft 7 in (1.70 m)	150	Senior	Plantation, FL	Graduated
Max Stiegwardt	USA	19	MF	5 ft 9 in (1.75 m)	165	Senior	Plymouth, MN	Graduated
Ricardo Oliveros	VEN	22	MF	5 ft 8 in (1.73 m)	165	Senior	Weston, FL	Graduated
Noah Murphy	USA	23	FW	6 ft 1 in (1.85 m)	195	Senior	Austin, TX	Graduated
Matthew Rosenberg	USA	26	GK	6 ft 1 in (1.85 m)	185	Junior	Manalapan, NJ	Transferred to Xavier

=== Incoming transfers ===
Name	Nat.	Number	Position	Height	Weight	Year	Hometown	Former School
Itzik Efraim	ISR	18	DF	6 ft 0 in (1.83 m)	189	Sophomore	Jerusalem, ISR	Belmont
Glademir Mendoza	MEX	31	DF	5 ft 11 in (1.80 m)	150	RS-Freshman	Phoenix, AZ	New Mexico

=== High school recruits ===
Name	Nat.	Hometown	High School	Club	TDS Rating
José Aldaco, Jr. FW	USA	Lake Alfred, FL	Auburndale	Weston FC	3/5 stars
Bernardo Brandão; GK	BRA	Rio de Janeiro, BRA	IMG Academy	—N/a	2/5 stars
Jeremy Di Lallo; MF	CAN	Blainville, QC	Montverde Academy	Orlando City	2/5 stars
Andrew Lizyness; MF	USA	Windermere, FL	Olympia (FL)	Acys Spirit United	3/5 stars
Josiah Ramírez; MF	USA	Harrisburg, PA	Lower Dauphin	Penn FC	2/5 stars
Jonas Schmalbäch; FW	ITA	Venice, ITA	ESNR	Lausanne	NR
Gino Vivi; FW	CRC	San José, CRC	CFIS	Saprissa	NR
Beto Ydrach; MF	PUR	Orlando, FL	Olympia (FL)	Orlando City	3/5 stars

== Roster ==
As of September 26, 2019

Note: Flags indicate national team as defined under FIFA eligibility rules; some limited exceptions apply. Players may hold more than one non-FIFA nationality.

No.	Pos.	Nation	Player
1	GK	GER	Yannik Oettl
3	FW	USA	Cal Jennings
4	DF	USA	Jack McCloskey
5	DF	CRC	Andres Hernandez Betancur
6	DF	FRA	Yanis Leerman
7	FW	GHA	Richard Amon
8	MF	ISR	Yoni Sorokin
9	FW	ITA	Jonas Schmalbach
10	MF	FRA	Louis Perez
11	FW	FRA	Hattabiou Barry
12	MF	BRA	Gregorio Ibanez
13	MF	USA	Josiah Ramirez
14	MF	BRA	Gianluca Arcangeli
15	DF	ENG	Gideon Adu-Peprah

No.	Pos.	Nation	Player
16	MF	PUR	Beto Ydrach
17	FW	CRC	Gino Vivi
18	DF	ISR	Itzik Efraim
19	MF	USA	Andrew Lizyness
20	MF	CRC	Mauricio Villalobos Vega
21	FW	USA	Brandon Golding
22	MF	CAN	Jeremy Di Lallo
23	MF	NOR	Thomas Ness
24	DF	USA	Jonathan Dean
25	GK	USA	Matt Douglass
26	GK	BRA	Bernardo Brandão
28	FW	ARG	Franco Loello
29	FW	USA	Jose Aldaco, Jr.
31	DF	MEX	Glademir Mendoza

=== Team management ===
Position	Staff
Athletic Director	Danny White
Head coach	Scott Calabrese
Associate Head Coach	Paul Souders
Assistant Coach	Jamie Davies
Volunteer Goalkeeper Coach	Peter Davis

== Schedule ==
Date Time, TV	Rank^{#}	Opponent^{#}	Result	Record	Site (Attendance) City, State
Preseason
August 19*; 7:00 p.m.	No. 15	Eastern Florida	W 6–0		UCF Soccer and Track Stadium; Orlando, FL
August 24*; 6:00 p.m.	No. 15	FIU	W 3–1		UCF Soccer and Track Stadium; Orlando, FL
Non-conference regular season
August 30*; 6:00 p.m.	No. 15	at No. 4 Wake Forest; Carolina Nike Classic	L 1–2	0–1–0	Spry Stadium (1,578); Winston-Salem, NC
September 1*; 6:00 p.m., ACCN	No. 15	at No. 6 North Carolina; Carolina Nike Classic	W 2–1	1–1–0	Fetzer Field (814); Chapel Hill, NC
September 6*; 7:00 p.m., Twitch	No. 15	Penn State	T 2–2 ^{2OT}	1–1–1	UCF Soccer and Track Stadium (706); Orlando, FL
September 8*; 7:00 p.m., UCFKnights.tv	No. 15	UTRGV	W 3–2 ^{OT}	2–1–1	UCF Soccer and Track Stadium (362); Orlando, FL
September 13*; 7:00 p.m., UCFKnights.tv	No. 16	VCU	W 2–0	3–1–1	UCF Soccer and Track Stadium (731); Orlando, FL
September 18*; 7:00 p.m.	No. 13	at Florida Gulf Coast	W 4–1	4–1–1	FGCU Soccer Complex (653); Fort Myers, FL
September 22*; 6:00 p.m., UCFKnights.tv	No. 13	South Carolina	W 2–0	5–1–1	UCF Soccer and Track Stadium (436); Orlando, FL
American Athletic regular season
September 27; 7:00 p.m., UCFKnights.tv	No. 12	Temple	W 2–0	6–1–1 (1–0–0)	UCF Soccer and Track Stadium (605); Orlando, FL
October 1*; 7:00 p.m., UCFKnights.tv	No. 11	Florida Atlantic	W 3–2 ^{OT}	7–1–1	UCF Soccer and Track Stadium (367); Orlando, FL
October 6; 8:00 p.m., ADN	No. 11	at No. 4 SMU	T 3–3 ^{2OT}	7–1–2 (1–0–1)	Westcott Field (2,719); Dallas, TX
October 12; 7:00 p.m., UCFKnights.tv	No. 9	Tulsa	W 3–2 ^{2OT}	8–1–2 (2–0–1)	UCF Soccer and Track Stadium (514); Orlando, FL
October 20; 7:00 p.m., ADN	No. 11	at UConn; Civil Conflict	W 2–1 ^{OT}	9–1–2 (3–0–1)	Dillon Stadium (1,625); Hartford, CT
October 26; 7:00 p.m., ADN	No. 8	at South Florida; War on I-4	W 1–0	10–1–2 (4–0–1)	Corbett Soccer Stadium (1,506); Tampa, FL
October 29*; 6:00 p.m., UCFKnights.tv	No. 8	Stetson	W 3–2 ^{2OT}	11–1–2	UCF Soccer and Track Stadium (346); Orlando, FL
November 1; 7:00 p.m., UCFKnights.tv	No. 6	Memphis	W 1–0	12–1–2 (5–0–1)	UCF Soccer and Track Stadium (826); Orlando, FL
November 5; 7:00 p.m., ADN	No. 6	at Cincinnati	W 3–2 ^{OT}	13–1–2 (6–0–1)	Gettler Stadium (373); Cincinnati, OH
AAC Tournament
November 13; 7:00 p.m., FBL	(1) No. 5	(5) Temple; Semifinals	W 5–0	14–1–2	UCF Soccer and Track Stadium (711); Orlando, FL
November 16; 7:00 p.m., ESPN3	(1) No. 5	(2) No. 10 SMU; AAC Championship	L 0–1	14–2–2	UCF Soccer and Track Stadium (1,237); Orlando, FL
NCAA Tournament
November 24; 6:00 p.m., ESPN+	(9) No. 8	No. 12 Missouri State; Second round	W 2–1 ^{OT}	15–2–2	UCF Soccer and Track Stadium (857); Orlando, FL
November 30; 8:30 p.m., ESPN+	(9) No. 8	at (8) No. 5 SMU; Third round	L 1–2 ^{OT}	15–3–2	Westcott Field (979); Dallas, TX
*Non-conference game. ^{#}Rankings from United Soccer Coaches. (#) Tournament seedings in parentheses. All times are in Eastern Time.

== Awards and honors ==
Recipient	Award	Date	Ref.
Cal Jennings	AAC Offensive Player of the Year	November 12, 2019	
Yoni Sorokin	AAC Midfielder of the Year	November 12, 2019	
Yannik Oettl	AAC Goalkeeper of the Year	November 12, 2019	
Gino Vivi	AAC Rookie of the Year	November 12, 2019	
Scott Calabrese	AAC Coaching Staff of the Year	November 12, 2019	
Yannik Oettl	All-AAC First Team	November 12, 2019	
Cal Jennings	All-AAC First Team	November 12, 2019	
Yoni Sorokin	All-AAC First Team	November 12, 2019	
Yanis Leerman	All-AAC First Team	November 12, 2019	
Louis Perez	All-AAC Second Team	November 12, 2019	
Glademir Mendoza	All-AAC Rookie Team	November 12, 2019	
Gino Vivi	All-AAC Rookie Team	November 12, 2019	
Cal Jennings	AAC All-Tournament Team	November 16, 2019	
Yannik Oettl	AAC All-Tournament Team	November 16, 2019	
Louis Perez	AAC All-Tournament Team	November 16, 2019	
Gino Vivi	AAC All-Tournament Team	November 16, 2019	
Cal Jennings	Soccer America All-America First-Team	December 12, 2019	
Cal Jennings	United Soccer Coaches All-America First-Team	December 12, 2019	
Cal Jennings	College Soccer News All-America First-Team	December 16, 2019	
Cal Jennings	Top Drawer Soccer All-America First-Team	December 23, 2019	
Yoni Sorokin	Top Drawer Soccer All-America Second-Team	December 23, 2019	
Yanis Leerman	Top Drawer Soccer All-America Second-Team	December 23, 2019	

== 2020 MLS Super Draft ==
Player	Team	Round	Pick #	Position
Cal Jennings	FC Dallas	1	17	FW
Jonathan Dean	Orlando City	2	39	DF

== Rankings ==
Ranking movement Legend: ██ Improvement in ranking. ██ Decrease in ranking. ██ Not ranked previous week. RV=Others receiving votes. NV=Not receiving votes.
Poll	Pre	Wk 1	Wk 2	Wk 3	Wk 4	Wk 5	Wk 6	Wk 7	Wk 8	Wk 9	Wk 10	Wk 11	Wk 12	Wk 13	Wk 14	Wk 15	Wk 16	Final
United Soccer	15	None	15	16	13	12	11	9	11	8	6	6	5	8	None Released			10
Top Drawer Soccer	17	17	11	19	17	14	9	3	3	6	4	4	3	8	8	10	10	10
College Soccer News	18	None	17	19	18	12	11	11	12	10	9	9	8	8	None Released			10
Soccer America	13	None	9	12	9	7	6	7	6	6	5	5	4	8	None Released			
