= American Conference Men's Soccer Player of the Year =

The American Athletic Conference Men's Soccer Player of the Year are annual awards given to the best attacking, midfield, defensive, and goalkeeping players in the American Athletic Conference during the NCAA Division I men's soccer season.

== Key ==
†	Co-Players of the Year
*	Awarded a national Player of the Year award: Hermann Trophy; NCAA Tournament MOP
Player (X)	Denotes the number of times the player had been awarded the AAC Player of the Year award at that point

== Offensive Player of the Year ==
Season	Nat.	Player	School	Class	Reference
2013	JAM	Romario Williams	UCF	Sophomore	
2014	CAN	Cyle Larin	UConn	Sophomore	
2015	VEN	Mauro Cichero	SMU	Sophomore	
2016	FIN	Matias Pyysalo	UCF	Junior	
2017	FIN	Matias Pyysalo (2)	UCF	Senior	
2018	USA	Cal Jennings	UCF	Junior	
2019	USA	Cal Jennings (2)	UCF	Senior	
2020	EST	Alex Meinhard	Tulsa	Freshman	
2021	EST	Alex Meinhard (2)	Tulsa	Sophomore	
2022	NOR	Knut Ahlander	SMU	Senior	
2023	BRA	Lineker Rodrigues dos Santos	Memphis	Junior	
2024	MLI	Mamadou Diarra	Florida Atlantic	Senior	
2025	MLI	Mamadou Diarra (2)	Florida Atlantic	Graduate Senior	
2026	COL	Santi Possu	FIU	Graduate Senior	

== Defensive Player of the Year ==
Season	Nat.	Player	School	Class	Reference
2013	USA	Jimmy Ockford	Louisville	Senior	
2014	JAM	Sergio Campbell	UConn	Senior	
2015	USA	Bradley Bourgeois	Tulsa	Senior	
2016	NGA	Prosper Figbe	South Florida	Sophomore	
2017	USA	Jordan Cano	SMU	Senior	
2018	USA	Jacob Hauser-Ramsey	UConn	Senior	
2019	USA	Eddie Munjoma	SMU	Junior	
2020	FRA	Pierre Cayet	Temple	Senior	
2021	ESP	Mariano Fazio	Tulsa	Junior	
2022	ESP	Mariano Fazio (2)	Tulsa	Senior	
2023	DEN	Mads Westergren	SMU	Junior	
2024	USA	Jackson Kim	Memphis	Graduate Senior	
2025	USA	Luke Adams	Tulsa	Sophomore	
2026	SCO	Harris O'Connor	Missouri State	5th Year Senior	

== Midfielder of the Year ==
Season	Nat.	Player	School	Class	Reference
2013	ESP	Adria Beso Marco	UConn	Junior	
2014	ESP	Adria Beso Marco (2)	UConn	Senior	
2015	CAN	Kwame Awuah	UConn	Junior	
2015	USA	John Lujano	SMU	Senior	
2016	SCO	Adam Wilson	Cincinnati	Sophomore	
2017	VEN	Mauro Cichero	SMU	Senior	
2018	USA	Jacob Hauser-Ramsey	UConn	Senior	
2019	FIN	Yoni Sorokin	UCF	Junior	
2019	BRA	Gabriel Costa	SMU	Sophomore	
2020	FIN	Yoni Sorokin (2)	UCF	Senior	
2020	NOR	Knut Ahlander	SMU	Junior	
2021	ESP	Henry Sach	Tulsa	Junior	
2022	NOR	Knut Ahlander	SMU	Senior	
2023	USA	Bailey Sparks	SMU	Junior	
2024	USA	Lleyton Imparato	Memphis	Junior	
2024	USA	Pedro Faife	USF	Sophomore	
2025	USA	Ben Fisher	Charlotte	Junior	
2026	ENG	Luc Achermann-Stanfield	Tulsa	Senior	

== Goalkeeper of the Year ==
Season	Nat.	Player	School	Class	Reference
2013	JAM	Andre Blake	UConn	Junior	
2014	SER	Spasoje Stefanović	South Florida	Freshman	
2015	USA	Michael Nelson	SMU	RS-Sophomore	
2016	SER	Spasoje Stefanović (2)	South Florida	Junior	
2017	USA	Michael Nelson (2)	SMU	RS-Senior	
2018	GER	Yannik Oettl	UCF	Sophomore	
2019	GER	Yannik Oettl (2)	UCF	Junior	
2020	GER	Yannik Oettl (3)	UCF	Senior	
2021	ESP	Alex Lopez	Tulsa	Freshman	
2022	ESP	Alex Lopez (2)	Tulsa	Sophomore	
2023	USA	Cole Johnson	SMU	Senior	
2024	CRO	Filip Sabatti	Memphis	Junior	
2025	GER	Leo Stritter	Charlotte	Senior	
2025	CAN	Jahiem Wickham	USF	Junior	
2026	USA	Carlito Saylon	Tulsa	Junior	
