= 2019 American Athletic Conference men's soccer tournament =

- Tournament Logo
- Classification: Division I
- Teams: 6
- Matches: 5
- Site: UCF Soccer and Track Stadium; Orlando, Florida
- Champions: SMU (3rd title)
- Winning coach: Kevin Hudson (3rd title)
- MVP: Offensive: Eddie Munjoma (SMU); Defensive: Grant Makela (SMU)
- Broadcast: American Digital Network, ESPN3

2019 American Athletic Conference men's soccer standings
	Conf.					Overall
Team	W		L		T	W		L		T
No. 10 UCF +	6	–	0	–	1	15	–	3	–	2
No. 7 SMU ‡	5	–	1	–	1	18	–	2	–	1
South Florida +	4	–	3	–	0	10	–	7	–	1
Memphis	4	–	3	–	0	10	–	7	–	0
Temple	3	–	2	–	2	8	–	8	–	2
UConn	2	–	5	–	0	5	–	12	–	1
Cincinnati	1	–	5	–	1	5	–	11	–	1
Tulsa	0	–	6	–	1	4	–	9	–	2
‡ – 2019 American Tournament champion + – Invited to the 2019 NCAA tournament; As of 17 December 2019; Rankings from United Soccer Coaches

The 2019 American Athletic Conference men's soccer tournament was the 7th edition of the American Athletic Conference Men's Soccer Tournament. The tournament decided the American Athletic Conference champion and guaranteed representative into the 2019 NCAA Division I men's soccer tournament. The tournament began on November 9 and concluded on November 16. For the first time in tournament history the six teams in the field were identical to the same teams that played in the previous year's tournament.

Two-time defending champions, SMU, successfully three-peated in the AAC Tournament, defeating UCF 1–0 in the championship.

== Seeds ==
Seed	School	Conference	Tiebreaker
1	UCF	6–0–1	
2	SMU	5–1–1	
3	South Florida	4–3–0	1–0 vs. Memphis
4	Memphis	4–3–0	0–1 vs. South Florida
5	Temple	3–2–2	
6	UConn	2–5–0	

== Bracket ==
First round November 9
4	Memphis	1
5	Temple	2
3	South Florida	1
6	UConn	0

Semifinals; November 13
1	UCF	5
5	Temple	0
2	SMU (2OT)	2
3	South Florida	1

Final; November 16
1	UCF	0
2	SMU	1

== Results ==
=== First round ===
November 9
7:00 p.m. EDT

No. 3 South Florida	1–0	No. 6 UConn
Billhardt 51'	Report

Corbett Soccer Stadium, Tampa
Attendance: 527
Referee: Khalaf Al-Latayfeh

November 9
8:00 p.m. EDT

No. 4 Memphis	1–2	No. 5 Temple
Ashton 25'	Report	Suarez 89'; Campbell 103'

Mike Rose Soccer Complex, Memphis
Referee: Richonne Clark

=== Semifinals ===
November 13
4:30 p.m. EDT

No. 2 SMU	2–1 (a.e.t.)	No. 3 South Florida
Hernandez 15'; Terwege 106'	Report	Billhardt 77'

UCF Soccer and Track Stadium, Orlando
Attendance: 711
Referee: Cassio Ribeiro

November 13
7:00 p.m. EDT

No. 1 UCF	5–0	No. 5 Temple
Efraim 20'; Jennings 30', 68', 73'; Villalobos 35'	Report

UCF Soccer and Track Stadium, Orlando
Attendance: 711
Referee: Carlos Fernandes

=== Final ===
November 16
7:00 p.m. EDT

No. 1 UCF	0–1	No. 2 SMU
	Report	Munjoma 24'

UCF Soccer and Track Stadium, Orlando
Attendance: 1,237
Referee: Richonne Clark

== Statistics ==
=== Top goalscorers ===
3 Goals

- (United States) Cal Jennings – UCF

2 Goals

- (Germany) Adrian Billhardt – South Florida

1 Goal

- (England) Sam Ashton – Memphis
- (Canada) Jalen Campbell – Temple
- (Israel) Itzik Efraim – UCF
- (United States) Nicky Hernandez – SMU
- (United States) Eddie Munjoma – SMU
- (Mexico) Esteban Suarez – Temple
- (United States) Brandon Terwege – SMU
- (Costa Rica) Mauricio Villalobos – UCF

== Awards and honors ==
- Tournament Offensive MVP: Eddie Munjoma
- Tournament Defensive MVP: Grant Makela

All-Tournament team:

- Adrian Billhardt, South Florida
- Pierre Cayet, Temple
- Cal Jennings, UCF
- Yannik Oettl, UCF
- Louis Perez, UCF
- Gino Vivi, UCF

- Gabriel Costa, SMU
- Grant Makela, SMU
- Eddie Munjoma, SMU
- Brandon Terwege, SMU
- Nicky Hernandez, SMU
