= 2019 SMU Mustangs men's soccer team =

American college soccer season

2019 SMU Mustangs men's soccer

AAC Tournament champions

NCAA Tournament, Quarterfinals
- Conference: American Athletic Conference
- U. Soc. Coaches poll: No. 7
- TopDrawerSoccer.com: No. 5
- Record: 18–2–1 (5–1–1 American)
- Head coach: Kevin Hudson (5th season)
- Assistant coaches: Ben Stoddard (2nd season); Brett Koziczkowski (6th season)
- Home stadium: Westcott Field

2019 American Athletic Conference men's soccer standings
	Conf.					Overall
Team	W		L		T	W		L		T
No. 10 UCF +	6	–	0	–	1	15	–	3	–	2
No. 7 SMU ‡	5	–	1	–	1	18	–	2	–	1
South Florida +	4	–	3	–	0	10	–	7	–	1
Memphis	4	–	3	–	0	10	–	7	–	0
Temple	3	–	2	–	2	8	–	8	–	2
UConn	2	–	5	–	0	5	–	12	–	1
Cincinnati	1	–	5	–	1	5	–	11	–	1
Tulsa	0	–	6	–	1	4	–	9	–	2
‡ – 2019 American Tournament champion + – Invited to the 2019 NCAA tournament; As of 17 December 2019; Rankings from United Soccer Coaches

The 2019 SMU Mustangs men's soccer team represented the Southern Methodist University during the 2019 NCAA Division I men's soccer season and the 2019 American Athletic Conference men's soccer season. The regular season began on August 30 and concluded on November 5. It was the program's 45th season fielding a men's varsity soccer team, and their 7th season in the AAC. The 2019 season was Kevin Hudson's fifth year as head coach for the program.

SMU finished the season with an 18–2–1 overall record and a 5–1–1 conference record, second-best in the AAC. The Mustangs went on to win the AAC Tournament for the third-consecutive time and reached the quarterfinals of the NCAA Tournament for the first time since 2010.

== Background ==
The 2018 SMU Mustangs men's soccer team had a record of 10–5–3 overall and 5–1–1 in the AAC. The team beat UCF in the finals of the AAC Tournament to claim the program's second consecutive conference title. The Mustangs earned an automatic bid to the 2018 NCAA Division I Men's Soccer Tournament, where they were eliminated in the first round by Oregon State.

== Player movement ==
=== Players leaving ===
Name	Nat.	Number	Position	Height	Weight	Year	Hometown	Reason for departure
Akean Shackleford	JAM	2	FW	6'0"	180	Jr.	Savanna-la-Mar	Transferred to Indian Hills Community College
Caleb Smith	USA	8	MF	5'9"	147	Sr.	Arlington, TX	Graduated
Emil Cuello	USA	10	MF	5'11"	165	Sr.	Orem, UT	Graduated
Christian Boorom	USA	11	MF	5'11"	180	Sr.	Fort Lauderdale, FL	Graduated
Cristobal Moreno	ESP	14	MF	6'0"	150	Fr.	Málaga	Left team
Dakota Okwuone	USA	20	FW	5'11"	185	Jr.	Olathe, KS	Left team
Carlos Vargas	USA	23	DF	6'4"	185	Fr.	Greeley, CO	Transferred to Midwestern State University
Elek Arany	USA	29	GK	6'2"	190	Fr.	Highlands Ranch, CO	Left team
Carter Emack	USA	30	GK	5'10"	162	Fr.	Birmingham, AL	Left team
Vlad Munteanu	USA	31	FW	5'10"	145	Fr.	Stillwater, OK	Left team
Kyle Gehman	USA	34	DF	6'1"	175	Fr.	Cedar Park, TX	Left team
Jack Meeker	USA	35	DF	6'0"	160	So.	La Canada, CA	Left team

=== Incoming transfers ===
Name	Nat.	Number	Position	Height	Weight	Year	Hometown	Former School
Henrik Bredeli	NOR	23	DF	6'2"	187	So.	Tranby	North Carolina
Gabriel Costa	BRA	11	MF	5'7"	160	So.	Rio de Janeiro	Azusa Pacific
Nick Taylor	CAM	16	FW	5'9"	160	Jr.	Coppell, TX	New Mexico
Brandon Terwege	USA	5	DF	6'1"	185	Jr.	Highland Village, TX	UCLA

=== High school recruits ===
Name	Nat.	Hometown	High School	Club	TDS Rating
Stephen Canty; GK	USA	Kerrville, TX	Tivy HS	Classics Elite	2/5 stars
Matt McLaws; FW	USA	Oklahoma City, OK	Deer Creek HS	OKC Energy PDL	2/5 stars
Mitchell Murphy; FW	USA	Quincy, IL	Notre Dame HS	Lou Fusz SC	2/5 stars
Anthony Perea; MF	USA	Frisco, TX	Lone Star HS	Dallas Texans	3/5 stars
Henry Smith-Hastie; MF	USA	Los Angeles, CA	Loyola HS	Santa Monica United	2/5 stars

== Squad ==
=== Roster ===
As of October 6, 2019

Note: Flags indicate national team as defined under FIFA eligibility rules; some limited exceptions apply. Players may hold more than one non-FIFA nationality.

No.	Pos.	Nation	Player
1	GK	(United States) USA	Grant Makela
3	DF	(United States) USA	Philip Ponder
4	DF	(United States) USA	Joshua Berney
5	DF	(United States) USA	Brandon Terwege
6	MF	(United States) USA	Noah Hilt
7	FW	(United States) USA	Garrett McLaughlin
8	MF	(Mexico) MEX	Nicky Hernandez
10	MF	(Norway) NOR	Knut Ahlander
11	MF	(Brazil) BRA	Gabriel Costa
12	DF	(United States) USA	Eddie Munjoma
13	GK	(United States) USA	Shane Lanson
14	MF	(United States) USA	Lane Warrington
15	MF	(United States) USA	DJ Williams
16	FW	(Cambodia) CAM	Nick Taylor
17	MF	(United States) USA	Luke Thompson

No.	Pos.	Nation	Player
18	GK	(United States) USA	Patrick Michael Hillyard
19	FW	(United States) USA	Wyatt Priest
20	MF	(United States) USA	Tobin Shanks
21	MF	(United States) USA	Jacob Cohen
22	DF	(United States) USA	Austin Vincent
23	DF	(Norway) NOR	Henrik Bredeli
24	DF	(United States) USA	Talen Maples
25	FW	(United States) USA	Mitchell Murphy
26	MF	(United States) USA	Henry Smith-Hastie
27	DF	(United States) USA	Thomas Haney
28	FW	(United States) USA	Matt McLaws
29	GK	(United States) USA	Stephen Canty
30	MF	(United States) USA	Anthony Perea
32	DF	(United States) USA	Sevon Pendergrass
33	MF	(United States) USA	Ryan Capo

=== Team management ===
Position	Staff
Athletic Director	Rick Hart
Head coach	Kevin Hudson
Associate head coach	Ben Stoddard
Assistant Coach	Brett Koziczkowski

== Schedule ==
Date Time, TV	Rank^{#}	Opponent^{#}	Result	Record	Site (Attendance) City, State
Non-conference regular season
August 30*; 7:00 p.m., PonyUp TV		Lipscomb	W 3–0	1–0–0	Westcott Field (1,258); Dallas, TX
September 2*; 7:00 p.m., PonyUp TV		Houston Baptist	W 7–1	2–0–0	Westcott Field (985); Dallas, TX
September 6*; 8:20 p.m., PonyUp TV		Saint Louis	W 2–0	3–0–0	Westcott Field (1,589); Dallas, TX
September 9*; 7:00 p.m., PonyUp TV	No. 22	UC Riverside	W 1–0	4–0–0	Westcott Field (881); Dallas, TX
September 13*; 7:00 p.m., PonyUp TV	No. 22	Valparaiso	W 6–0	5–0–0	Westcott Field (1,215); Dallas, TX
September 16*; 7:00 p.m.	No. 8	at No. 2 Duke	W 2–0	6–0–0	Koskinen Stadium (237); Durham, NC
September 21*; 6:00 p.m.	No. 8	at Denver	W 2–1 ^{OT}	7–0–0	CIBER Field (1,059); Denver, CO
American Athletic regular season
September 28; 7:00 p.m., ADN	No. 8	at Tulsa; Rivalry	W 5–1	8–0–0 (1–0–0)	HS&T Stadium (388); Tulsa, OK
October 1*; 7:00 p.m., PonyUp TV	No. 4	Central Arkansas	W 3–0	9–0–0	Westcott Field (1,985); Dallas, TX
October 6; 7:00 p.m., ADN	No. 4	No. 11 UCF	T 3–3 ^{2OT}	9–0–1 (1–0–1)	Westcott Field (2,719); Dallas, TX
October 11; 6:00 p.m., ADN	No. 3	at South Florida	W 3–0	10–0–1 (2–0–1)	Corbett Soccer Stadium (822); Tampa, FL
October 18; 7:00 p.m., PonyUp TV	No. 3	Memphis	L 3–4 ^{OT}	10–1–1 (2–1–1)	Westcott Field (1,993); Dallas, TX
October 22*; 7:00 p.m., PonyUp TV	No. 12	Stetson	W 5–0	11–1–1 (2–1–1)	Westcott Field (1,389); Dallas, TX
October 26; 6:00 p.m.	No. 12	at Cincinnati	W 7–1	12–1–1 (3–1–1)	Gettler Stadium (311); Cincinnati, OH
November 1; 7:00 p.m., PonyUp TV	No. 12	UConn	W 1–0	13–1–1 (4–1–1)	Westcott Field (2,319); Dallas, TX
November 5; 6:00 p.m.	No. 11	at Temple	W 2–1 ^{2OT}	14–1–1 (5–1–1)	Temple Owls Sports Complex (398); Philadelphia, PA
American Athletic Tournament
November 13; 4:00 p.m., ADN	(2) No. 10	vs. (3) South Florida; Semifinals	W 2–1 ^{2OT}	15–1–1	UCF Soccer and Track Stadium (711); Orlando, FL
November 16; 7:00 p.m., ESPN3	(2) No. 10	at (1) No. 5 UCF; Championship	W 1–0	16–1–1	UCF Soccer and Track Stadium (1,237); Orlando, FL
NCAA Tournament
November 24; 7:00 p.m., ESPN+	(8) No. 5	Coastal Carolina; Second round	W 1–0 ^{2OT}	17–1–1	Westcott Field (1,150); Dallas, TX
November 30; 7:30 p.m., ESPN+	(8) No. 5	(9) No. 8 UCF; Third round	W 2–1 ^{OT}	18–1–1	Westcott Field (979); Dallas, TX
December 6; 6:00 p.m., ACCN	(8) No. 5	at (1) No. 1 Virginia; Quarterfinals	L 2–3 ^{OT}	18–2–1	Klöckner Stadium (1,674); Charlottesville, VA
*Non-conference game. ^{#}Rankings from United Soccer Coaches. (#) Tournament seedings in parentheses. All times are in Central Time.

== Statistics ==
=== Players ===
No.	Player	GP	G	A	Pts.	Sh.	Shot%	SOG	SOG%	GW	Pk.	Pk. At.
7	Garrett McLaughlin	21	16	5	37	76	.211	43	.566	7	0	1
12	Eddie Munjoma	21	12	8	32	46	.261	19	.413	4	0	0
11	Gabriel Costa	18	8	11	27	54	.148	22	.407	2	3	4
10	Knut Ahlander	21	7	13	27	57	.123	22	.386	1	0	0
8	Nicky Hernandez	21	5	2	12	33	.152	14	.424	2	0	0
23	Henrik Bredeli	21	3	3	9	18	.167	5	.278	1	0	0
5	Brandon Terwege	19	2	3	7	16	.125	8	.500	1	0	0
6	Noah Hilt	20	2	2	6	10	.200	6	.600	0	0	0
26	Henry Smith-Hastie	19	2	1	5	4	.500	3	.750	0	0	0
19	Wyatt Priest	14	2	0	4	8	.250	3	.375	0	0	0
15	DJ Williams	17	1	1	3	15	.067	8	.533	0	0	0
24	Talen Maples	10	1	1	3	4	.250	1	.250	0	0	0
27	Thomas Haney	15	1	1	3	3	.333	1	.333	0	0	0
16	Nick Taylor	19	0	3	3	9	.000	2	.222	0	0	0
14	Lane Warrington	21	0	3	3	7	.000	3	.429	0	0	0
3	Philip Ponder	18	0	1	1	6	.000	4	.667	0	0	0
1	Grant Makela	15	0	1	1	0	.000	0	.000	0	0	0
20	Tobin Shanks	7	0	0	0	1	.000	0	.000	0	0	0
17	Luke Thompson	7	0	0	0	0	.000	0	.000	0	0	0
18	Patrick Michael Hillyard	1	0	0	0	0	.000	0	.000	0	0	0
21	Jacob Cohen	3	0	0	0	0	.000	0	.000	0	0	0
4	Joshua Berney	5	0	0	0	0	.000	0	.000	0	0	0
13	Shane Lanson	8	0	0	0	0	.000	0	.000	0	0	0

=== Goalies ===
No.	Player	GP	Min	GA	GAA	Saves	SPct.	SHO
1	Grant Makela	15	1395:24	14	0.90	63	.818	7
13	Shane Lanson	8	570:40	2	0.32	16	.889	4
18	Patrick Michael Hillyard	1	0:03	1	18.00	0	.000	0
TM	TEAM	–	0:00	0	0.00	1	1.000	0

=== Disciplinary record ===
Rank	No.	Nat.	Po.	Name	Regular Season			AAC Tournament			NCAA Tournament			Total		
Rank	No.	Nat.	Po.	Name	Booked	(yellow card) (yellow-red card)	Sent off (straight red)	Booked	(yellow card) (yellow-red card)	Sent off (straight red)	Booked	(yellow card) (yellow-red card)	Sent off (straight red)	Booked	(yellow card) (yellow-red card)	Sent off (straight red)
1	6	USA	MF	Noah Hilt	4	0	0	1	0	0	1	0	0	6	0	0
2	3	USA	DF	Philip Ponder	2	0	0	0	0	0	1	0	0	3	0	0
2	5	USA	DF	Brandon Terwege	2	0	0	0	0	0	1	0	0	3	0	0
4	23	NOR	DF	Henrik Bredeli	2	0	0	0	0	0	0	0	0	2	0	0
4	11	BRA	MF	Gabriel Costa	1	0	0	1	0	0	0	0	0	2	0	0
4	27	USA	DF	Thomas Haney	1	0	0	1	0	0	0	0	0	2	0	0
4	7	USA	FW	Garrett McLaughlin	1	0	0	0	0	0	1	0	0	2	0	0
4	14	USA	MF	Lane Warrington	1	0	0	1	0	0	0	0	0	2	0	0
9	10	NOR	MF	Knut Ahlander	1	0	0	0	0	0	0	0	0	1	0	0
9	8	MEX	MF	Nicky Hernandez	0	0	0	0	0	0	1	0	0	1	0	0
9	24	USA	DF	Talen Maples	1	0	0	0	0	0	0	0	0	1	0	0
9	5	USA	DF	Eddie Munjoma	1	0	0	0	0	0	0	0	0	1	0	0
9	26	USA	MF	Henry Smith-Hastie	1	0	0	0	0	0	0	0	0	1	0	0
Total					18	0	0	4	0	0	5	0	0	27	0	0

== Awards and honors ==
Recipient	Award	Date	Ref.
Talen Maples	Preseason All-AAC Team	August 20, 2019	
Nicky Hernandez	College Soccer News Team of the Week (9/1)	September 1, 2019	
Talen Maples	AAC Defensive Player of the Week (9/9)	September 9, 2019	
Eddie Munjoma	Top Drawer Soccer Team of the Week (9/10)	September 12, 2019	
Shane Lanson	United Soccer Coaches National Player of the Week (9/17)	September 17, 2019	
Brandon Terwege	Top Drawer Soccer Team of the Week (9/17)	September 19, 2019	
Garrett McLaughlin	College Soccer News Team of the Week (9/22)	September 22, 2019	
Garrett McLaughlin	AAC Offensive Player of the Week (9/23)	September 23, 2019	
Shane Lanson	AAC Goalkeeper of the Week (9/23)	September 23, 2019	
Garrett McLaughlin	Top Drawer Soccer Team of the Week (9/24)	September 26, 2019	
Gabriel Costa	AAC Offensive Player of the Week (9/30)	September 30, 2019	
Gabriel Costa	Top Drawer Soccer Team of the Week (10/1)	October 3, 2019	
Gabriel Costa	AAC Offensive Player of the Week (10/7)	October 7, 2019	
Gabriel Costa	Top Drawer Soccer Team of the Week (10/8)	October 10, 2019	
Garrett McLaughlin	Senior CLASS Award Finalist	October 11, 2019	
Garrett McLaughlin	College Soccer News Player of the Week (10/27)	October 27, 2019	
Garrett McLaughlin	College Soccer News Team of the Week (10/27)	October 27, 2019	
Garrett McLaughlin	AAC Offensive Player of the Week (10/28)	October 28, 2019	
Garrett McLaughlin	United Soccer Coaches National Player of the Week (10/29)	October 29, 2019	
Garrett McLaughlin	Top Drawer Soccer Team of the Week (10/29)	October 31, 2019	
Grant Makela	AAC Goalkeeper of the Week (11/6)	November 6, 2019	
Eddie Munjoma	AAC Defensive Player of the Year	November 12, 2019	
Gabriel Costa	AAC Midfielder of the Year	November 12, 2019	
Garrett McLaughlin	All-AAC First Team	November 12, 2019	
Gabriel Costa	All-AAC First Team	November 12, 2019	
Eddie Munjoma	All-AAC First Team	November 12, 2019	
Knut Ahlander	All-AAC Second Team	November 12, 2019	
Henrik Bredeli	All-AAC Rookie Team	November 12, 2019	
Eddie Munjoma	AAC Tournament Most Outstanding Offensive Player	November 16, 2019	
Grant Makela	AAC Tournament Most Outstanding Defensive Player	November 16, 2019	
Gabriel Costa	AAC All-Tournament Team	November 16, 2019	
Grant Makela	AAC All-Tournament Team	November 16, 2019	
Eddie Munjoma	AAC All-Tournament Team	November 16, 2019	
Brandon Terwege	AAC All-Tournament Team	November 16, 2019	
Nicky Hernandez	AAC All-Tournament Team	November 16, 2019	
Eddie Munjoma	College Soccer News Team of the Week (11/17)	November 17, 2019	
Eddie Munjoma	Top Drawer Soccer Team of the Week (11/19)	November 21, 2019	
Grant Makela	College Soccer News Team of the Week (12/1)	December 1, 2019	
Eddie Munjoma	College Soccer News Team of the Week (12/1)	December 1, 2019	
Eddie Munjoma	Top Drawer Soccer Team of the Week (12/3)	December 5, 2019	
Gabriel Costa	Top Drawer Soccer Team of the Week (12/10)	December 12, 2019	
Eddie Munjoma	Soccer America All-America First-Team	December 12, 2019	
Gabriel Costa	Soccer America All-America Third-Team	December 12, 2019	
Eddie Munjoma	United Soccer Coaches All-America First-Team	December 12, 2019	
Gabriel Costa	United Soccer Coaches All-America Third-Team	December 12, 2019	
Eddie Munjoma	College Soccer News All-America First-Team	December 16, 2019	
Garrett McLaughlin	College Soccer News All-America Second Team	December 16, 2019	
Gabriel Costa	College Soccer News All-America Third Team	December 16, 2019	
Eddie Munjoma	Top Drawer Soccer All-America First-Team	December 23, 2019	
Gabriel Costa	Top Drawer Soccer All-America Second-Team	December 23, 2019	

== 2020 MLS Super Draft ==
Player	Team	Round	Pick #	Position
Garrett McLaughlin	Houston Dynamo	1	8	FW

== Rankings ==
Ranking movement Legend: ██ Improvement in ranking. ██ Decrease in ranking. ██ Not ranked previous week. RV=Others receiving votes. NV=Not receiving votes.
Poll	Pre	Wk 1	Wk 2	Wk 3	Wk 4	Wk 5	Wk 6	Wk 7	Wk 8	Wk 9	Wk 10	Wk 11	Wk 12	Wk 13	Wk 14	Wk 15	Wk 16	Final
United Soccer	RV	None	RV	22	8	8	4	3 (1)	3	12	12	11	10	5	None Released			7
Top Drawer Soccer	NV	NV	RV	16	9	4	2	4	4	12	11	11	11	3	3	3	5	5
College Soccer News	22	None	20	18	15	8	4	2	2	6	6	6	5	3	None Released			5
Soccer America	NV	None	21	16	10	8	3	3	3	10	8	8	7	5	None Released			

== See also ==
- 2019 SMU Mustangs women's soccer team
