= 2018 SMU Mustangs men's soccer team =

American college soccer season

2018 SMU Mustangs men's soccer

AAC Tournament Champions

NCAA Tournament, First Round
- Conference: American Athletic Conference
- Record: 10–5–3 (5–1–1 American)
- Head coach: Kevin Hudson (4th season)
- Assistant coaches: Ben Stoddard (1st season); Brett Koziczkowski (5th season)
- Home stadium: Westcott Field

2018 American Athletic Conference men's soccer standings
| | Conf. | | | | | Overall |
| Team | W | | L | | T | W | | L | | T |
|---|---|---|---|---|---|---|---|---|---|---|
| No. 18 UCF + | 5 | – | 1 | – | 1 | 13 | – | 3 | – | 3 |
| SMU ‡+ | 5 | – | 1 | – | 1 | 10 | – | 5 | – | 3 |
| South Florida | 4 | – | 1 | – | 2 | 7 | – | 8 | – | 2 |
| Connecticut + | 3 | – | 2 | – | 2 | 12 | – | 6 | – | 2 |
| Memphis | 2 | – | 4 | – | 1 | 8 | – | 7 | – | 4 |
| Temple | 2 | – | 4 | – | 1 | 5 | – | 10 | – | 4 |
| Tulsa | 2 | – | 5 | – | 0 | 6 | – | 9 | – | 2 |
| Cincinnati | 1 | – | 6 | – | 0 | 3 | – | 14 | – | 1 |
‡ – 2018 American Tournament champion + – Invited to the 2018 NCAA Division I Men's Soccer Championship; As of December 11, 2018; Rankings from United Soccer Coaches

The 2018 SMU Mustangs men's soccer team represented the Southern Methodist University during the 2018 NCAA Division I men's soccer season and the 2018 American Athletic Conference men's soccer season. The regular season began on August 24 and concluded on November 2. It was the program's 44th season fielding a men's varsity soccer team, and their 6th season in the AAC. The 2018 season was Kevin Hudson's fourth year as head coach for the program.

== Roster ==
As of November 15, 2018

Note: Flags indicate national team as defined under FIFA eligibility rules; some limited exceptions apply. Players may hold more than one non-FIFA nationality.

| No. | Pos. | Nation | Player |
|---|---|---|---|
| 1 | GK | (United States) USA | Grant Makela |
| 2 | FW | (Jamaica) JAM | Akean Shackleford |
| 3 | DF | (United States) USA | Philip Ponder |
| 4 | DF | (United States) USA | Joshua Berney |
| 6 | MF | (United States) USA | Noah Hilt |
| 7 | FW | (United States) USA | Garrett McLaughlin |
| 8 | MF | (United States) USA | Caleb Smith |
| 10 | MF | (United States) USA | Emil Cuello |
| 11 | MF | (United States) USA | Christian Boorom |
| 12 | DF | (United States) USA | Eddie Munjoma |
| 13 | GK | (United States) USA | Shane Lanson |
| 14 | MF | (Spain) ESP | Cristobal Moreno |
| 15 | MF | (United States) USA | DJ Williams |
| 16 | MF | (Norway) NOR | Knut Ahlander |
| 17 | MF | (United States) USA | Luke Thompson |
| 18 | GK | (United States) USA | Patrick Michael Hillyard |
| 19 | MF | (Mexico) MEX | Nicky Hernandez |

| No. | Pos. | Nation | Player |
|---|---|---|---|
| 20 | FW | (United States) USA | Dakota Okwuone |
| 21 | MF | (United States) USA | Jacob Cohen |
| 22 | DF | (United States) USA | Austin Vincent |
| 23 | DF | (United States) USA | Carlos Vargas |
| 24 | DF | (United States) USA | Talen Maples |
| 25 | MF | (United States) USA | Lane Warrington |
| 26 | MF | (United States) USA | Tobin Shanks |
| 27 | DF | (United States) USA | Thomas Haney |
| 28 | MF | (United States) USA | Wyatt Priest |
| 29 | GK | (United States) USA | Elek Arany |
| 30 | MF | (United States) USA | Carter Emack |
| 31 | FW | (United States) USA | Vlad Munteanu |
| 32 | DF | (United States) USA | Sevon Pendergrass |
| 33 | MF | (United States) USA | Ryan Capo |
| 34 | DF | (United States) USA | Kyle Gehman |
| 35 | DF | (United States) USA | Jack Meeker |

== Schedule ==
| Date Time, TV | Rank^{#} | Opponent^{#} | Result | Record | Site (Attendance) City, State |
SMU Tournament
| August 24*; 7:50 p.m., PonyUp TV | No. 8 | Providence | L 1–2 ^{2OT} | 0–1–0 | Westcott Field (816); Dallas, TX |
| August 26*; 7:00 p.m., PonyUp TV | No. 8 | Campbell | W 4–0 | 1–1–0 | Westcott Field (400); Dallas, TX |
Non-conference regular season
| August 31*; 7:00 p.m., PonyUp TV | | Incarnate Word | W 1–0 | 2–1–0 | Westcott Field (838); Dallas, TX |
| September 3*; 7:00 p.m., PonyUp TV | | No. 19 Denver | L 0–1 | 2–2–0 | Westcott Field (350); Dallas, TX |
| September 8*; 7:00 p.m. | | at Saint Louis | T 1–1 ^{2OT} | 2–2–1 | Hermann Stadium (543); St. Louis, MO |
| September 14*; 7:00 p.m., PonyUp TV | | Houston Baptist | L 1–3 | 2–3–1 | Westcott Field (350); Dallas, TX |
| September 16*; 1:00 p.m., PonyUp TV | | Gonzaga | W 2–0 | 3–3–1 | Westcott Field (250); Dallas, TX |
American Athletic Conference regular season
| September 22; 10:00 a.m. | | Tulsa; Rivalry | W 1–0 | 4–3–1 (1–0–0) | Crum Sports Field (150); Dallas, TX |
| September 28; 6:00 p.m. | | at UCF | L 0–2 | 4–4–1 (1–1–0) | UCF Soccer and Track Stadium (786); Orlando, FL |
| October 1*; 6:00 p.m. | | at Stetson | W 3–1 | 5–4–1 | Athletic Training Center (190); DeLand, FL |
| October 6; 7:00 p.m., ADN | | South Florida | T 1–1 ^{2OT} | 5–4–2 (1–1–1) | Westcott Field (508); Dallas, TX |
| October 12; 7:00 p.m. | | at Memphis | W 3–0 | 6–4–2 (2–1–1) | Mike Rose Soccer Complex (166); Memphis, TN |
| October 20; 7:00 p.m., PonyUp TV | | Cincinnati | W 3–1 | 7–4–2 (3–1–1) | Westcott Field (612); Dallas, TX |
| October 28; 11:00 a.m., ADN | | at Cincinnati | W 2–0 | 8–4–2 (4–1–1) | Morrone Stadium (4,086); Storrs, CT |
| November 2; 7:00 p.m., PonyUpTV | | Temple | W 2–1 | 9–4–2 (5–1–1) | Westcott Field (1,033); Dallas, TX |
American Athletic Conference Tournament
| November 8; 4:30 p.m. | (2) | vs. (6) Memphis; Semifinals | W 2–1 ^{2OT} | 10–4–2 | UCF Soccer and Track Stadium; Orlando, FL |
| November 10; 6:00 p.m., ESPN3 | (2) | vs. (1) No. 9 UCF; Finals | T 1–1 (5–4 PKs) ^{3OT} | 10–4–3 | UCF Soccer and Track Stadium (1,108); Orlando, FL |
NCAA Tournament
| November 15; 8:00 p.m. | | at No. 24 Oregon State; First Round | L 1–2 | 10–5–3 | Lorenz Field (806); Corvallis, OR |
*Non-conference game. ^{#}Rankings from United Soccer Coaches. (#) Tournament seedings in parentheses. All times are in Central Time.

== See also ==
- 2018 SMU Mustangs women's soccer team
