= 2018 American Athletic Conference men's soccer tournament =

- Tournament Logo
- Classification: Division I
- Teams: 6
- Matches: 5
- Site: UCF Soccer and Track Stadium; Orlando, Florida
- Champions: SMU (2nd title)
- Winning coach: Kevin Hudson (2nd title)
- MVP: Offensive: Emil Cuello (SMU); Defensive: Grant Makela (SMU)
- Broadcast: American Digital Network, ESPN3

2018 American Athletic Conference men's soccer standings
	Conf.					Overall
Team	W		L		T	W		L		T
No. 18 UCF +	5	–	1	–	1	13	–	3	–	3
SMU ‡+	5	–	1	–	1	10	–	5	–	3
South Florida	4	–	1	–	2	7	–	8	–	2
Connecticut +	3	–	2	–	2	12	–	6	–	2
Memphis	2	–	4	–	1	8	–	7	–	4
Temple	2	–	4	–	1	5	–	10	–	4
Tulsa	2	–	5	–	0	6	–	9	–	2
Cincinnati	1	–	6	–	0	3	–	14	–	1
‡ – 2018 American Tournament champion + – Invited to the 2018 NCAA Division I Men's Soccer Championship; As of December 11, 2018; Rankings from United Soccer Coaches

The 2018 American Athletic Conference men's soccer tournament was the 6th edition of the American Athletic Conference Men's Soccer Tournament. The tournament decided the American Athletic Conference champion and guaranteed representative into the 2018 NCAA Division I Men's Soccer Championship. The tournament began on November 6 and concluded on November 10.

In a rematch of the 2017 AAC championship, defending champions, SMU, successfully defended their title. The final match was a 1-1 draw in regulation before SMU bested UCF in penalty kicks to claim their second-ever AAC championship. SMU midfielder, Emil Cuello was named the Offensive Most valuable player of the tournament, while SMU's Grant Makela was named the Defensive Most valuable player of the tournament.

As champions, SMU earned the conference's automatic bid into the 2018 NCAA Tournament. In addition to SMU, regular season champions and tournament runners-up, UCF earned an at-large bid, as well as Connecticut. In the NCAA Tournament, SMU was eliminated in the first round by Oregon State. Connecticut beat Rhode Island in the first round before losing to Indiana in the second round. UCF was seeded 14th in NCAA Tournament, and earned a second round bye. There, UCF lost to Lipscomb in overtime.

== Seeds ==
Seed	School	Conference	Tiebreaker
1	UCF	5–1–1	UCF 1–0 vs. SMU
2	SMU	5–1–1	SMU 0–1 vs. UCF
3	South Florida	4–1–2	
4	Connecticut	3–2–2	
5	Temple	2–4–1	Goal differential
6	Memphis	2–4–1	Goal differential

== Bracket ==
First round Nov. 6
4	Connecticut	3
5	Temple	1
3	South Florida	1
6	Memphis	3

Semifinals; Nov. 8
1	UCF (2OT)	3
4	Connecticut	2
2	SMU (OT)	2
6	Memphis	1

Final; Nov. 10
1	UCF	1 (4)
2	SMU (pen.)	1 (5)

== Results ==
=== First round ===
November 6
4:30 p.m. EST

No. 3 South Florida	1–3	No. 6 Memphis
Zis 33'	Report	Zalzman 38'; Mikus 81'; Sangha 87'

UCF Soccer and Track Stadium
Orlando, Florida
Attendance: 41
Referee: Daniel Thornberry

November 6
7:00 p.m. EST

No. 4 Connecticut	3–1	No. 5 Temple
Sarver 40' (o.g.); Harris 69'; Venner 74'	Report	Mohamed 25'

UCF Soccer and Track Stadium
Orlando, Florida
Attendance: 53
Referee: Cassio Rubio

=== Semifinals ===
November 8
4:30 p.m. EST

No. 2 SMU	2–1 (a.e.t.)	No. 6 Memphis
Shackleford 44'; Ponder 103'	Report	Ierides 18'

UCF Soccer and Track Stadium
Orlando, Florida
Attendance: 0
Referee: Mark Allatin

November 8
7:00 p.m. EST

No. 1 UCF	3–2 (a.e.t.)	No. 4 Connecticut
Sorokin 49'; Jennings 82'; Stiegwardt 110'	Report	Burnett 30'; Thiam 43'

UCF Soccer and Track Stadium
Orlando, Florida
Attendance: 581
Referee: Khalaf Al-Latayfeh

=== Final ===
November 10
7:00 p.m. EST

No. 1 UCF	1–1 (a.e.t.)	No. 2 SMU
Hernández 90'	Report	Boorom 73'
Penalties
Gorka (penalty scored); Jennings (penalty scored); McCloskey (penalty missed); Dawkins (penalty scored); Ibanez (penalty scored)	4–5	(penalty scored) Smith; (penalty scored) Maples; (penalty scored) McLaughlin; (penalty scored) Shackleford; (penalty scored) Cuello

UCF Soccer and Track Stadium
Orlando, Florida
Attendance: 1,108
Referee: Jorge Luna Hernandez

== Statistics ==
=== Top goalscorers ===
1 Goal

- (United States) Christian Boorom – SMU
- (United States) Josh Burnett – Connecticut
- (Canada) Dayonn Harris – Connecticut
- (Cyprus) Alexandros Ierides – Memphis
- (United States) Cal Jennings – UCF
- (Costa Rica) Andrés Hernández – UCF
- (United States) Chris Mikus – Memphis
- (United States) Belal Mohamed — Temple
- (United States) Philip Ponder – SMU
- (Canada) Gurman Sangha – Memphis
- (Paraguay) Max Stiegwardt – UCF
- (Jamaica) Akean Shackleford – SMU
- (Israel) Yoni Sorokin – UCF
- (Senegal) Abdou Mbacke Thiam – Connecticut
- (Vermont Republic) Cole Venner – Connecticut
- (Venezuela) David Zalzman – Memphis
- (Canada) Alex Zis – South Florida

Own goals

- (United States) Nick Sarver — Temple (playing against Connecticut)

== Awards and honors ==
- Tournament Offensive MVP: Emil Cuello, SMU
- Tournament Defensive MVP: Grant Makela, SMU

All-Tournament team:

- Abdou Mbacke Thiam, UConn
- Gurman Sangha, Memphis
- Cal Jennings, UCF
- Andres Hernandez, UCF
- Yanis Leerman, UCF

- Louis Perez, UCF
- Christian Boorom, SMU
- Emil Cuello, SMU
- Akean Shackelford, SMU
- Philip Ponder, SMU
- Grant Makela, SMU
