= 2019 South Florida Bulls men's soccer team =

American college soccer season

2019 South Florida Bulls men's soccer

NCAA Tournament, First Round
- Conference: American Athletic Conference
- Record: 11–7–1 (4–3–0 American)
- Head coach: Bob Butehorn (3rd season)
- Assistant coaches: Jeremy Hurdle (1st season); Matt Poplawski (1st season)
- Captain: Harrison Devenish-Meares
- Home stadium: Corbett Soccer Stadium

2019 American Athletic Conference men's soccer standings
| | Conf. | | | | | Overall |
| Team | W | | L | | T | W | | L | | T |
|---|---|---|---|---|---|---|---|---|---|---|
| No. 10 UCF + | 6 | – | 0 | – | 1 | 15 | – | 3 | – | 2 |
| No. 7 SMU ‡ | 5 | – | 1 | – | 1 | 18 | – | 2 | – | 1 |
| South Florida + | 4 | – | 3 | – | 0 | 10 | – | 7 | – | 1 |
| Memphis | 4 | – | 3 | – | 0 | 10 | – | 7 | – | 0 |
| Temple | 3 | – | 2 | – | 2 | 8 | – | 8 | – | 2 |
| UConn | 2 | – | 5 | – | 0 | 5 | – | 12 | – | 1 |
| Cincinnati | 1 | – | 5 | – | 1 | 5 | – | 11 | – | 1 |
| Tulsa | 0 | – | 6 | – | 1 | 4 | – | 9 | – | 2 |
‡ – 2019 American Tournament champion + – Invited to the 2019 NCAA tournament; As of 17 December 2019; Rankings from United Soccer Coaches

The 2019 South Florida Bulls men's soccer team represented the University of South Florida during the 2019 NCAA Division I men's soccer season and the 2019 American Athletic Conference men's soccer season. The regular season began on August 30 and concluded on November 5. It was the program's 55th season fielding a men's varsity soccer team, and their 7th season in the AAC. The 2019 season was Bob Butehorn's third year as head coach for the program.

== Roster ==
As of October 1, 2019

Note: Flags indicate national team as defined under FIFA eligibility rules; some limited exceptions apply. Players may hold more than one non-FIFA nationality.

| No. | Pos. | Nation | Player |
|---|---|---|---|
| 1 | GK | (Australia) AUS | Harrison Devenish-Meares |
| 3 | DF | (United States) USA | Sergio Pineros-Mayorga |
| 4 | DF | (Brazil) BRA | Henrique Gallina |
| 5 | DF | (Canada) CAN | Salvatore Mazzaferro |
| 6 | MF | (Spain) ESP | Richard Laval |
| 7 | MF | (Brazil) BRA | Vinicius Loureiro |
| 8 | FW | (Germany) GER | Adrian Billhardt |
| 9 | FW | (France) FRA | Victor Claudel |
| 10 | MF | (United States) USA | Josue Monge |
| 11 | FW | (Spain) ESP | Ignasi Lupon Fores |
| 12 | MF | (United States) USA | Stephen Rudderham |
| 13 | DF | (United States) USA | Freddy Gil |
| 14 | MF | (El Salvador) SLV | Diego Guerrero |

| No. | Pos. | Nation | Player |
|---|---|---|---|
| 15 | FW | (United States) USA | Braden Ammon |
| 16 | MF | (United States) USA | Felipe Baptista |
| 17 | MF | (United States) USA | Trey Jackson |
| 18 | MF | (Panama) PAN | Emilio Ycaza |
| 19 | DF | (United States) USA | Marcus Murphy |
| 21 | DF | (Jamaica) JAM | Javain Brown |
| 22 | DF | (United States) USA | Jonathan Rosales |
| 23 | MF | (Cuba) CUB | Santiago Burgos |
| 24 | MF | (The Bahamas) BAH | Gordon Phipps |
| 27 | DF | (United States) USA | Avionne Flanagan |
| 30 | GK | (United States) USA | Cooper Blay |
| 31 | GK | (United States) USA | Berk Watson |
| 33 | GK | (Japan) JPN | Kazuna Takase |
| 35 | MF | (United States) USA | Juju Duran |

== Schedule ==
| Date Time, TV | Rank^{#} | Opponent^{#} | Result | Record | Site (Attendance) City, State |
Preseason
| August 17*; 7:00 p.m. | | Eastern Florida | W 2–0 | | Corbett Soccer Stadium (492); Tampa, FL |
| August 21*; 7:00 p.m. | | Eckerd | W 1–0 | | Corbett Soccer Stadium (359); Tampa, FL |
| August 24*; 7:00 p.m. | | at Tampa; Rowdies Cup | W 1–0 | | Pepin Stadium (783); Tampa, FL |
Regular season
| August 29*; 8:00 p.m., BTN+ | | at No. 1 Maryland | L 0–1 | 0–1–0 | Ludwig Field (4,010); College Park, MD |
| September 6*; 7:00 p.m. | | Marquette | W 2–1 | 1–1–0 | Corbett Soccer Stadium (684); Tampa, FL |
| September 9*; 7:00 p.m. | | No. 5 Louisville | W 2–0 | 2–1–0 | Corbett Soccer Stadium (702); Tampa, FL |
| September 13*; 7:00 p.m. | | at Lipscomb | W 3–1 | 3–1–0 | Lipscomb Soccer Complex (584); Nashville, TN |
| September 17*; 7:00 p.m. | | Ohio State | L 0–2 | 3–2–0 | Corbett Soccer Stadium (597); Tampa, FL |
| September 24*; 7:00 p.m. | | at North Florida | W 1–0 | 4–2–0 | Hodges Stadium (1,612); Jacksonville, FL |
| September 27; 7:00 p.m., Bullsvision | | UConn | W 2–1 | 5–2–0 (1–0–0) | Corbett Soccer Stadium (813); Tampa, FL |
| October 1*; 7:00 p.m. | | Florida Gulf Coast | W 1–0 | 6–2–0 | Corbett Soccer Stadium (754); Tampa, FL |
| October 5; 8:00 p.m., ADN | | at Tulsa | W 2–1 | 7–2–0 (Note: The match was suspended in the 68th minute due to severe weather. On October 14, the final 22 minutes was played at Corbett Soccer Stadium, where the scoreline remained 2–1. The result was used for AAC recordkeeping and was not recognized by NCAA. USF in their team records recognizes the match as a victory.) (2–0–0) | Hurricane Soccer & Track Stadium (306); Tulsa, OK |
| October 11; 8:00 p.m., ADN | | No. 3 SMU | L 0–3 | 7–3–0 (2–1–0) | Corbett Soccer Stadium (822); Tampa, FL |
| October 15*; 7:00 p.m. | | Jacksonville | W 4–1 | 8–3–0 | Corbett Soccer Stadium (882); Tampa, FL |
| October 18; 7:00 p.m. | | at Temple | L 1–3 | 8–4–0 (2–2–0) | Temple Sports Complex (346); Philadelphia, PA |
| October 22*; 7:00 p.m. | | No. 11 FIU | T 2–2 ^{2OT} | 8–4–1 | Corbett Soccer Stadium (578); Tampa, FL |
| October 26; 7:00 p.m. | | No. 8 UCF; War on I-4 | L 0–1 | 8–5–1 (2–3–0) | Corbett Soccer Stadium (1,506); Tampa, FL |
| November 1; 7:00 p.m. | | Cincinnati | W 4–0 | 9–5–1 (3–3–0) | Corbett Soccer Stadium (582); Tampa, FL |
| November 5; 7:00 p.m. | | at Memphis | W 3–1 | 10–5–1 (4–3–0) | Billy J. Murphy Stadium (582); Memphis, TN |
American Athletic Tournament
| November 9; 7:00 p.m., ADN | (3) | (6) UConn; Quarterfinals | W 1–0 | 11–5–1 | Corbett Soccer Stadium (527); Tampa, FL |
| November 15; 4:30 p.m., ADN | (3) | vs. (2) No. 10 SMU; Semifinals | L 1–2 ^{2OT} | 11–6–1 | UCF Soccer and Track Stadium (711); Orlando, FL |
NCAA Tournament
| November 21; 7:30 p.m., ACCN | | at Louisville; First round | L 1–4 | 11–7–1 | Lynn Stadium (402); Louisville, KY |
