= Nick Taylor (footballer) =

Cambodian footballer (born 1998)

Nick Taylor នីក ថេល័រ
Personal information
- Full name: Nicolas Doeung Taylor
- Date of birth: 2 September 1998 (age 28)
- Place of birth: Dallas, Texas, United States
- Height: 1.78 m (5 ft 10 in)
- Position: Right winger

Team information
- Current team: PT Prachuap
- Number: 67

Youth career
- Dallas Texans

College career
Years	Team	Apps	(Gls)
2017–2018	New Mexico Lobos	29	(6)
2019–2021	SMU Mustangs	31	(2)
2021	UCF Knights	16	(3)

Senior career*
Years	Team	Apps	(Gls)
2022–2023	Orlando City	0	(0)
2022–2023	Orlando City B	22	(1)
2023–2025	Svay Rieng	53	(7)
2025–	PT Prachuap	18	(1)

International career^{‡}
2022–	Cambodia	23	(1)
- * Club domestic league appearances and goals as of 20 January 2026 ‡ National team caps and goals as of 13 November 2025

Nicolas Doeung Taylor (Khmer: នីកូឡាស ឌឿង ថៃល័រ; born 2 September 1998) is a professional footballer who plays as a winger for Thai League 1 club PT Prachuap. Born in the United States, he represents the Cambodia national team.

== Early years ==
=== College career ===
Growing up in Dallas, Texas, Taylor played soccer for Coppell High School where he won the Texas UIL 6A State Championship in 2016 and was named to the 2016–17 NSCAA Winter-Spring High School Boys All-American Team. He was a two-time Gatorade State Player of the Year nominee, finishing as runner-up in 2016. Taylor also played club soccer for Dallas Texans, helping the team become U.S. Youth Soccer National bronze medalist in 2013. With Dallas Texans, Taylor also won two State Cups and two Classic League Division I titles.

Taylor played five seasons of college soccer between 2017 and 2021 while majoring in marketing. Although he received numerous Division 2 and Division 3 offers, Taylor's only D1 offer was from Conference USA team New Mexico Lobos, coached by Paul Souders. Souders had heard of Taylor as early as middle school because their mothers worked together at the school Taylor was at and later also attended his alma mater, Coppell High School. Despite inviting Taylor to a New Mexico talent ID camp and eventually getting him to verbally commit to New Mexico, Souders left the program to become an assistant to Scott Calabrese at UCF Knights the day before signing day but made a phone call to Taylor, convincing him to remain committed. Taylor ultimately played two seasons at New Mexico, making 29 appearances, scoring six goals and five assists. He earned 2018 All-Conference USA Second Team honors.

When the Lobos program was shut down following the 2018 season, Taylor initially reached out to Souders but UCF already had depth at the winger position. Instead he joined SMU Mustangs of the American Athletic Conference. As a junior, he played 20 games in the 2019 season, registering three assists including one in a 3–3 tie with UCF during the regular season. SMU also beat UCF 1–0 in the 2019 American Athletic Conference Men's Soccer Tournament final. With the 2020 season delayed until Spring 2021 due to the COVID-19 pandemic, Taylor started all 11 matches during the shortened season, scoring two goals including one against UCF.

Having been granted an additional year of eligibility due to the shortened nature of the pandemic season, Taylor entered the NCAA transfer portal. Souders spotted his name on the transfer portal and convinced head coach Calabrese to offer Taylor a spot on the team that night having been impressed during frequent meetings between SMU and UCF. In his fifth year, Taylor started all 16 of UCF's games, scoring three goals and nine assists.

== Club career ==
=== Orlando City B ===
On 11 January 2022, Taylor was selected in the third round (74th overall) of the 2022 MLS SuperDraft by Orlando City. Having spent time with the club in preseason camp, he signed a professional contract with the team's reserve affiliate, Orlando City B, in MLS Next Pro ahead of 2022 season. He made his professional debut on 26 March in the season opener.

=== Preah Khan Reach Svay Rieng ===
On 3 February 2023, Nick was unveiled as the new player for Preah Khan Reach Svay Rieng of the Cambodian Premier League. He made his debut on 26 February as a 63rd-minute substitute against Nagaworld in the Cambodian League Cup and scored six minutes later. PKR Svay Rieng won 5–0.

== International career ==
Born in the United States, Taylor's mother is Cambodian making him eligible to represent both United States and Cambodia internationally. In May 2022, it was reported Cambodian coaches were considering selecting Taylor for the upcoming 2023 AFC Asian Cup qualification third round matches in June but this ultimately did not happen. However, in September 2022, Taylor was first named to a preliminary list of 40 players for an upcoming international friendly against Bangladesh before being named to the final 24-player squad two weeks later.

Taylor made his Cambodia national team debut on 23 September 2022, entering as a 60th-minute substitute in a 1–0 lost to Bangladesh. In December 2022, he was named to the squad to compete at the 2022 AFF Championship. On 29 December 2022, Taylor scored his first international goal, a penalty in a 5–1 victory over Brunei in the group stage of the competition.

== Career statistics ==
=== Club ===
As of 24 October 2024

Club	Season	League			National Cup		League Cup (Note: Cambodian League Cup)		Playoffs		Total	
Club	Season	Division	Apps	Goals	Apps	Goals	Apps	Goals	Apps	Goals	Apps	Goals
Orlando City B	2022	MLS Next Pro	22	1	—		—		—		22	1
PKR Svay Rieng	2023–24	Cambodian Premier League	24	4	0	0	5	3	—		29	7
PKR Svay Rieng	2024–25	Cambodian Premier League	5	0	0	0	0	0	—		5	0
Career total			46	5	0	0	5	3	0	0	51	8

=== International ===
As of 15 October 2024

Appearances and goals by national team and year
National team	Year	Apps	Goals
Cambodia	2022	4	1
Cambodia	2023	5	0
Cambodia	2024	7	0
Total		16	1

As of match played 29 December 2022:
Cambodia score listed first, score column indicates score after each Taylor goal

List of international goals scored by Nick Taylor
No.	Date	Venue	Cap	Opponent	Score	Result	Competition	Ref.
1	29 December 2022	Morodok Techo National Stadium, Phnom Penh, Cambodia	4	Brunei	2–1	5–1	2022 AFF Championship	

== Honours ==
SMU Mustangs

- American Athletic Conference Tournament: 2019

Orlando City

- U.S. Open Cup: 2022

PKR Svay Rieng

- Cambodian Premier League: 2023–24
- Hun Sen Cup: 2023–24
