= Chase Bromstedt =

American soccer player (born 1998)

Personal information
- Date of birth: May 26, 1998 (age 28)
- Place of birth: Sioux City, Iowa, United States
- Height: 5 ft 9 in (1.75 m)
- Positions: Midfielder; left-back

Youth career
- 2010–2017: Sporting Kansas City

College career
Years	Team	Apps	(Gls)
2017–2021	Tulsa Golden Hurricane	75	(9)

Senior career*
Years	Team	Apps	(Gls)
2017	Swope Park Rangers	0	(0)
2019–2021	Kaw Valley FC	16	(0)
2022	Las Vegas Lights	14	(0)
2022–2023	Kansas City Comets (indoor)	8	(0)
2023	FC Tulsa	4	(0)
- * Club domestic league appearances and goals as of October 20, 2023

Chase Bromstedt (born May 26, 1998) is an American professional soccer player who plays as a midfielder.

== Career ==
=== Youth, college and amateur ===
Bromstedt attended Park Hill South High School, also playing club soccer for the Sporting Kansas City academy from 2010 to 2017. He appeared on the bench for Sporting's United Soccer League affiliate side Swope Park Rangers for a single fixture during their 2017 season. In the 2016–17 season, Bromstedt started 13 of the side's 14 games, adding two goals from the midfield. The season before, Bromstedt had scored four goals in 29 appearances, helping the team to advance to the U.S. Soccer Development Academy Playoff Quarterfinals for the first time in program history in July 2016. He served as the captain of the U18 team, and helped Sporting claim the US Youth Futsal National Championship three times, Missouri State Championship twice and finish as Region II US Youth Soccer Association Regional Finalists two times.

In 2017, Bromstedt attended the University of Tulsa to play college soccer. In four complete seasons, including a truncated 2020 season to the COVID-19 pandemic, Bromdstedt made 75 appearances for the Golden Hurricane, scoring nine goals and tallying 13 assists. In his sophomore season, he was named to the American Athletic Conference all-conference second team, and in his senior year earned The American all-conference second-team honors and all-tournament team accolades.

While at college, Bromdstedt also competed in the USL League Two with Kaw Valley FC between 2019 and 2021, making 16 regular season appearances.

=== Professional ===
On February 4, 2022, it was announced that Bromstedt had signed with USL Championship side Las Vegas Lights. Bromstedt debuted for the club on April 6, 2022, starting in a 3–2 loss to FC Tucson in the Lamar Hunt U.S. Open Cup. He made his full professional league debut on May 14, 2022, starting in a 1–1 draw with Oakland Roots. Bromstedt returned to the Kansas City area for the 2022–23 Major Arena Soccer League season, signing with the Kansas City Comets.

On February 28, 2023, Bromstedt was announced as a new signing for USL Championship side FC Tulsa.
