= Hylton Dayes =

American soccer coach (born 1964)

Personal information
- Date of birth: 22 February 1964 (age 62)
- Place of birth: Kingston, Jamaica
- Position: Defender

College career
Years	Team	Apps	(Gls)
1982–1985	Wright State Raiders		

Senior career*
Years	Team	Apps	(Gls)
1988–1989	Dayton Dynamo		
1989	Orlando Lions		

Managerial career
- 1986: Wright State Raiders (assistant -men's)
- 1987–1993: Wright State Raiders (women's)
- 1994–1996: James Madison Dukes (assistant -men's)
- 1997–2000: Wright State Raiders
- 2001–2020: Cincinnati Bearcats
- * Club domestic league appearances and goals

Hylton Dayes is a retired men's soccer coach. He previously coached at Wright State University and the University of Cincinnati.

== Career ==
He played his college soccer at Wright State, where he was a four-year starter. From 1986 to 1993, he was the head women's soccer coach at Wright State. From 1994 to 1996, he served as an assistant coach at James Madison University. From 1997 to 2000, he was the head men's soccer coach at Wright State University, where he went 32–37–8.

At Cincinnati, he led the Bearcats to their third ever NCAA tournament appearance in 2006, and is the winningest soccer coach in school history. His 2006 team won the Big East red division title, and was ranked as high as 14th in the nation at one point. After 28 seasons his overall career record as a head coach stood at 232–244–63. He retired from Cincinnati in 2020.

He played professional soccer for the Dayton Dynamo and the Orlando Lions.

== Personal life ==
Dayes was married to Karen Ferguson-Dayes in 2008, and has a son, Brandon.
