= Scott Calabrese =

American former soccer goalkeeper

Current position
- Title: Head coach
- Team: UCF Knights
- Conference: Sun Belt
- Record: 88–48–16

Biographical details
- Born: June 2, 1972 (age 54); New Haven, Connecticut, United States
- Education: Bryant Bulldogs

Playing career
- 1990–1994: Bryant Bulldogs
- 1995–1997: Rhode Island Stingrays
- 1998: South Carolina Shamrocks

Coaching career (HC unless noted)
- 1995: Western Connecticut (assistant)
- 1997–1998: Southern Wesleyan (assistant)
- 1998–1999: Stetson (assistant)
- 2000–2001: North Carolina (assistant)
- 2002–2003: Carolina Courage (assistant)
- 2003–2006: Clemson (assistant)
- 2007–2013: East Tennessee State
- 2014–2016: FIU
- 2017– present: UCF

Head coaching record
- Overall: 173–115–36

Accomplishments and honors

Championships
- Sun Belt Tournament Champions (2025); AAC Tournament Champions (2020); 3x AAC Regular Season Champions (2018, 2019, 2020); C-USA Tournament Champions (2015); 2x ASUN Tournament champions (2010, 2013)

Awards
- Sun Belt Coach of the year (2023); NSCAA Southeast Region Coach of the Year (2015); C-USA Coach of the Year (2015); NSCAA South Region Coach of the Year (2010); ASUN Coach of the Year (2010)

Louis Scott Calabrese (born June 2, 1972) is an American former soccer goalkeeper who is currently the head men's soccer coach at University of Central Florida.

== Playing career ==
Calabrese attended Bryant University from 1990 to 1995. During this time, he was a four-year letterman and earned All-Conference honors while playing goalkeeper for the Bulldogs. After graduating in 1995 with a B.A. in business administration, Calabrese played professionally for the Rhode Island Stingrays from 1995 to 1997 and for the South Carolina Shamrocks in 1998.

== Coaching career ==
While still playing, Calabrese started his coaching career as an assistant and goalkeeper coach at Western Connecticut State University in 1995 and then at Southern Wesleyan University from 1997 to 1998. After his playing career was over in 1998, he was appointed assistant coach to his first NCAA Division I program at Stetson University. During his time with the Hatters, he assisted in all aspects of the program, including program administration, team training and conditioning, game preparation and recruiting while directly overseeing the training, conditioning and game preparation of goalkeepers. After Stetson, Calabrese was hired by the University of North Carolina in a similar role. During his time with the Tar Heels, he helped guide the team to an Elite Eight Appearance and the ACC Championship in 2000 and the National Championship in 2001. Calabrese joined the professional ranks in 2002 when he joined the Carolina Courage of the WUSA. He helped guide the team from worst to first in one year while winning the 2002 Regular Season and Founders Cup. After the WUSA suspended operations in 2003, Calabrese joined Clemson University. During four seasons with the Tigers, the team went to three NCAA Tournaments and the 2005 College Cup. In addition to his assistant coaching duties, Calabrese was Director of the Clemson Soccer Academy which plays host to over 1,800 children each year. Calabrese was a member of the 2006 Olympic Development Program Region III coaching staff as well as the goalkeepers coach for the U.S. Women's National Team. Calabrese has an “A” coaching license, and is a Level I and II certified goalkeeping instructor with the NSCAA.

=== East Tennessee State Buccaneers ===
In 2007, Calabrese was hired by East Tennessee State University to be the head coach of the Buccaneers' inaugural men's soccer program. During six seasons with the Buccaneers, Calabrese led the team to two NCAA Tournament appearances in 2010 and 2013 and won the 2010 and 2013 Atlantic Sun Tournament Championships. During his time with the Buccaneers, Calabrese was awarded the 2010 Atlantic Sun and NSCAA South Region Coach of the Year. His team set the Atlantic Sun Record with 10 Shutouts in 2013 and had four consecutive seasons of ten or more wins from 2010 to 2013.

=== FIU Panthers ===
After six successful seasons with the Buccaneers, Calabrese was hired by Florida International University to replace outgoing head coach Kenny Arena, who left to become an assistant coach for the LA Galaxy under his father, Bruce Arena.

=== UCF Knights ===
Calabrese was hired by the University of Central Florida to coach the men's soccer team on December 5, 2016.
