= Jacob Hauser-Ramsey =

American soccer player

Personal information
- Full name: Jacob Thomas Hauser-Ramsey
- Date of birth: August 4, 1995 (age 31)
- Place of birth: Seattle, Washington, U.S.
- Height: 6 ft 4 in (1.93 m)
- Position: Defender

Youth career
- 2009–2014: Seattle Sounders FC

College career
Years	Team	Apps	(Gls)
2015	Tyler Apache	21	(1)
2016–2018	Connecticut Huskies	55	(0)

Senior career*
Years	Team	Apps	(Gls)
2016	Seattle Sounders FC U-23	1	(0)
2017	Myrtle Beach Mutiny	1	(0)
2019	Memphis 901	14	(0)
2020	Portland Timbers 2	1	(0)
2020	Memphis 901	2	(0)
- * Club domestic league appearances and goals as of October 5, 2020

Jacob Thomas Hauser-Ramsey (born August 4, 1995) is an American former soccer player.

== Career ==
=== College & Youth ===
Hauser-Ramsey played fours years of college soccer, beginning at Tyler Junior College, before transferring to the University of Connecticut in 2015.

While at college, Hauser-Ramsey also appeared for USL PDL sides Seattle Sounders FC U-23 and Myrtle Beach Mutiny.

=== Professional ===
On January 11, 2019, Hauser-Ramsey was selected 42nd overall in the 2019 MLS SuperDraft by Colorado Rapids.

On March 21, 2019, Hauser-Ramsey joined USL Championship side Memphis 901 ahead of their inaugural season.

Hauser-Ramsey joined USL Championship side Portland Timbers 2 on March 5, 2020.

On September 9, 2020, Hauser-Ramsey returned to Memphis 901 for the remainder of the 2020 season.
