= Yannik Oettl =

German footballer

Personal information
- Date of birth: 19 November 1996 (age 29)
- Place of birth: Munich, Germany
- Height: 6 ft 2 in (1.88 m)
- Position: Goalkeeper

College career
Years	Team	Apps	(Gls)
2017–2021	UCF Knights	58	(0)

Senior career*
Years	Team	Apps	(Gls)
2014–2015	SpVgg Unterhaching	2	(0)
2014–2015	SpVgg Unterhaching II	1	(0)
2015–2016	FC Augsburg II	12	(0)
2021	Ocean City Nor'easters	4	(0)
2021–2022	New England Revolution II	3	(0)
2022	→ Hartford Athletic (loan)	19	(0)
2023–2024	Indy Eleven	28	(0)
- * Club domestic league appearances and goals as of 13:54, 20 November 2024 (UTC)

Yannik Oettl (born 19 November 1996) is a German footballer who most recently played as a goalkeeper for Indy Eleven in the USL Championship.

== Career ==
Oettl made his professional debut for SpVgg Unterhaching on matchday 37, on 16 May 2015, in a 1–0 win against Preußen Münster. His only other appearance for the first team was a 1–0 loss against Rot-Weiß Erfurt. He also made an appearance for the reserve team.

Oettl signed with FC Augsburg on 26 June 2015.

In 2017 he moved to the US and studies at the University of Central Florida in Orlando.

In 2021, Oetell appeared for USL League Two side Ocean City Nor'easters, making four appearances.

On 22 July 2021, Oettl signed with USL League One club New England Revolution II.

On 12 May 2022, Oettl joined Hartford Athletic on loan for the remainder of the 2022 season.

Oettl was announced as a new signing for USL Championship side Indy Eleven on 6 December 2022, joining the team for the 2023 season. He made 28 league appearances over two seasons before departing the club at the end of the 2024 season.

== Career statistics ==
As of 11 October 2021

Appearances and goals by club, season and competition
Club	Season	League			Cup^{1}		Continental^{2}		Total		Ref.
Club	Season	League	Apps	Goals	Apps	Goals	Apps	Goals	Apps	Goals	Ref.
SpVgg Unterhaching	2014–15	3. Liga	2	0	—		—		2	0	
SpVgg Unterhaching II	2014–15	Bayernliga Süd	1	0	—		—		1	0	
FC Augsburg II	2015–16	Regionalliga Bayern	12	0	—		—		12	0	
New England Revolution II	2021	USL League One	2	0	—		—		2	0	
Career total			17	0	0	0	0	0	17	0	—
