= Cal Jennings =

American soccer player (born 1997)

Personal information
- Full name: Caleb Jennings
- Date of birth: May 17, 1997 (age 29)
- Place of birth: Atlanta, Georgia, United States
- Height: 5 ft 11 in (1.80 m)
- Position: Forward

Team information
- Current team: Sacramento Republic
- Number: 26

Youth career
- 2015–2016: Georgia United

College career
Years	Team	Apps	(Gls)
2016–2019	UCF Knights	66	(45)

Senior career*
Years	Team	Apps	(Gls)
2020	Memphis 901	14	(9)
2021	Indy Eleven	0	(0)
2021–2022	Los Angeles FC	9	(0)
2021–2022	→ Las Vegas Lights (loan)	45	(22)
2023–2024	Tampa Bay Rowdies	64	(34)
2025	Charleston Battery	30	(17)
2026	FC Ryukyu	13	(0)
2026–	Sacramento Republic	11	(1)
- * Club domestic league appearances and goals as of November 11, 2026

Cal Jennings (born May 17, 1997) is an American professional soccer player who plays as a forward for Sacramento Republic in the USL Championship.

== Early life and college ==
Born in Atlanta, Georgia, Jennings attended Roswell High School where he played two seasons for the school's soccer team. He also spent a season with U.S. Soccer Development Academy club Georgia United.

After graduating high school, Jennings enrolled at the University of Central Florida and joined the UCF Knights college soccer team. He made his debut on August 26, 2016, against the Grand Canyon Antelopes. He scored his first and only goal of his freshman season on October 8 against the Memphis Tigers in a 2–3 defeat. During the 2017 season, Jennings scored 7 goals in 16 matches. The next season, Jennings had a breakout season, scoring 20 goals and starting all 18 matches for the Knights. He ended the season tied as the NCAA Division I top-scorer.

During his final season with the Knights, Jennings scored 18 goals in 20 matches, earning several individual accolades. He was named a semifinalist for the Hermann Trophy for the 2019 season.

== Club career ==
=== Memphis 901 ===
On January 9, 2020, Jennings was selected with the 17th overall pick by FC Dallas in the 2020 MLS SuperDraft. However, in late February, he was released from the club's pre-season camp without earning a first-team contract. A few months later, on July 13, Jennings joined USL Championship club Memphis 901.

Jennings made his professional debut for Memphis 901 on July 15, coming on as a 62nd-minute substitute during a 3–0 defeat against Birmingham Legion. He then scored his first goal for the club on July 18 against Atlanta United 2 during a 2–2 draw.

Jennings ended his first season scoring a hat-trick on October 3 against Birmingham Legion. His three goals helped the club to a 3–1 victory. This was part of a scoring run in which Jennings scored in four games in a row, netting eight goals.

=== Los Angeles FC ===
On December 4, 2020, Jennings joined USL Championship club Indy Eleven for the 2021 season. However, on March 9, 2021, it was announced that Jennings had signed with Major League Soccer club Los Angeles FC without playing a game for Indy Eleven. To make the signing, Los Angeles FC traded their natural third-round selection in the 2022 MLS SuperDraft for Jennings's college rights from FC Dallas. Following the 2022 season, Jennings was released by LAFC.

=== Tampa Bay Rowdies ===
On January 26, 2023, Jennings signed with USL Championship side Tampa Bay Rowdies. He left Tampa Bay following their 2024 season.

=== Charleston Battery ===
On February 18, 2025, Jennings signed with USL Championship side Charleston Battery. On 1 December, 2025, Jennings left Charleston Battery.

=== FC Ryukyu ===
In January 2026, Jennings signed with J3 League side FC Ryukyu in Okinawa, Japan.

=== Sacramento Republic FC ===
On August 14, 2026 Sacramento Republic FC of the USL Championship announced they had signed Jennings to a contract.

== Career statistics ==
As of match played August 25, 2021

Appearances and goals by club, season and competition
Club	Season	League			National cup		Other		Total	
Club	Season	Division	Apps	Goals	Apps	Goals	Apps	Goals	Apps	Goals
Memphis 901	2020	USL Championship	14	9	—	—	—	—	14	9
Los Angeles FC	2021	Major League Soccer	6	0	0	0	—	—	6	0
Charleston Battery	2025	USL Championship	10	11	0	0	—	—	10	11
Career total			30	20	0	0	0	0	30	20

== Honors ==
Los Angeles FC

- MLS Cup : 2022
- Supporters' Shield: 2022

individual

- USL Championship All-League First-team: 2023
- USL Championship All-League Second-team: 2024
- AAC Offensive player of the year: 2018, 2019
- First-team All-American: 2018, 2019
- NCAA Top goalscorer: 2019
