= UCF Soccer and Track Stadium =

Stadium in Orlando, Florida

UCF Soccer and Track Complex

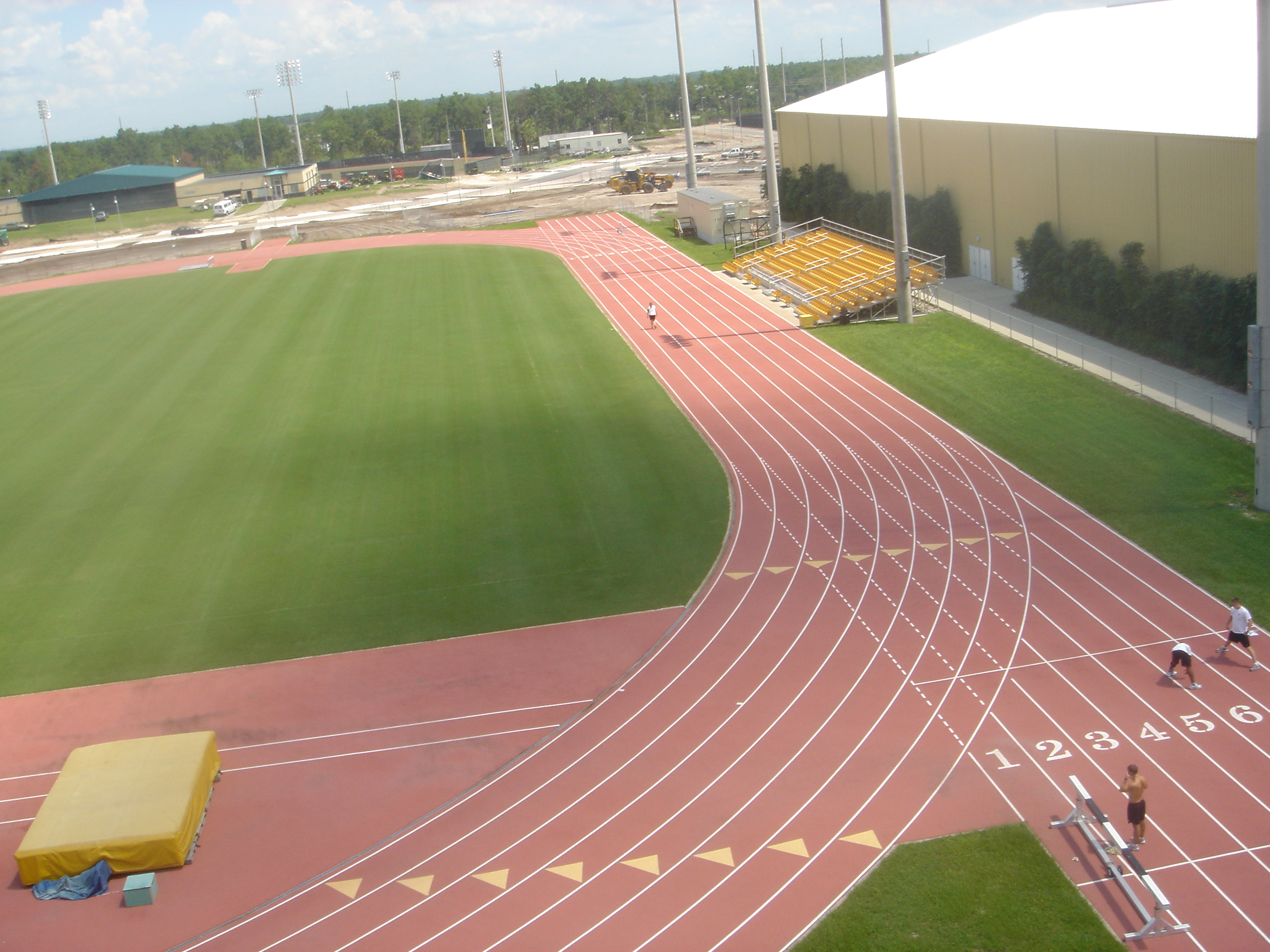
- View of the stands and track in 2007
- Interactive map of UCF Soccer and Track Complex
- Address: 4275 E Plaza Dr; Orlando, FL; United States
- Coordinates: 28°36′28″N 81°11′43″W
- Owner: University of Central Florida
- Operator: UCF Athletics
- Capacity: 2,000
- Type: Multi-purpose stadium
- Surface: Natural Grass / Martin Surface
- Record attendance: 2,706 (2013)
- Field size: 347 feet (106 m) x 200 feet (61 m); 8 lane, 400 meter track
- Current use: Soccer; Track and field
- Public transit: UCF Transit Center,

Construction
- Opened: 1991 (34–35 years ago)
- Renovated: 2011 (14–15 years ago)

Tenants
- UCF Knights (NCAA) teams: (1991–present); men's and women's soccer; track and field; cross country; Professional teams: Kraze United (NPSL) (2015)

Website
- ucfknights.com/soccer-and-track-complex

The UCF Soccer and Track Complex is a multi-purpose stadium located on the main campus of the University of Central Florida near Orlando, Florida, United States in unincorporated Orange County. The 2,000-seat stadium is home to the UCF Knights track and field, cross country and soccer teams. The Knights compete in the Big 12 Conference.

== Location ==
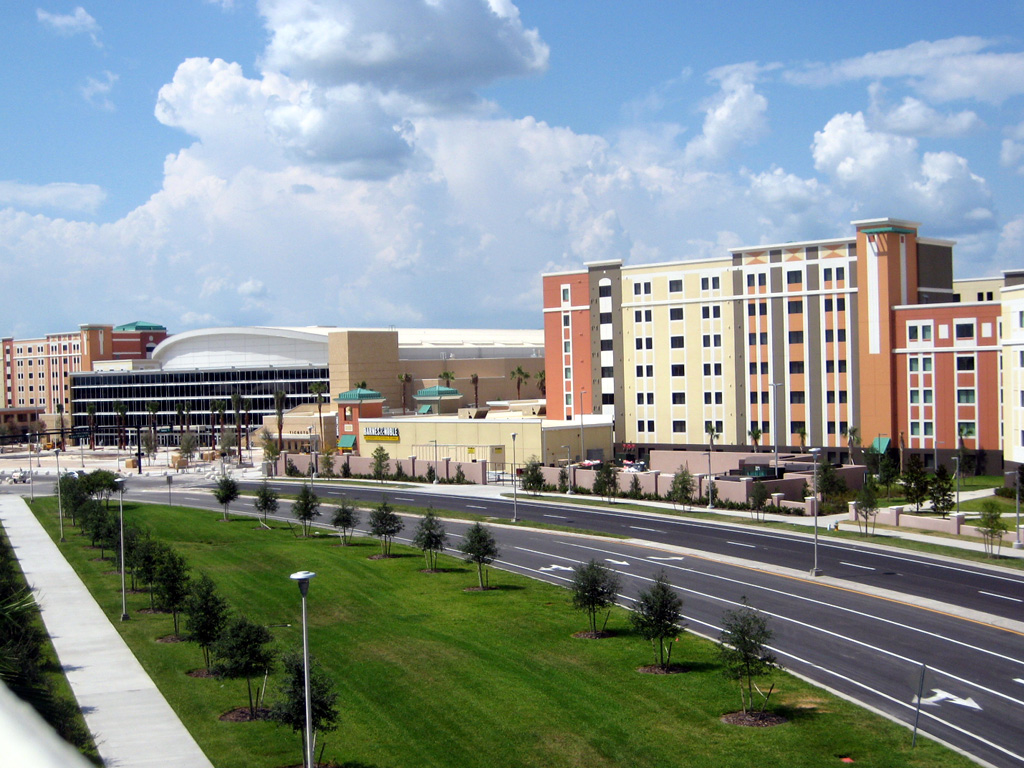
Knights Plaza, part of UCF's Athletic Village

UCF's Soccer and Track Complex is located on the northern edge of the University of Central Florida's 1,415-acre (573 ha) main campus, which is approximately 13 miles (21 km) northeast of downtown Orlando and 55 miles (89 km) southwest of Daytona Beach.

The stadium is located within Knights Plaza, which is a part of UCF's Athletic Village. Also located within Knights Plaza is Addition Financial Arena, the indoor arena of UCF Knights basketball, The Venue, the indoor arena of UCF Knights volleyball, John Euliano Park, the home field of UCF Knights baseball, and the Towers residence halls, which house 2,000 UCF students, including student-athletes. To the east of the complex is FBC Mortgage Stadium, home of the UCF Knights football team.

== History ==
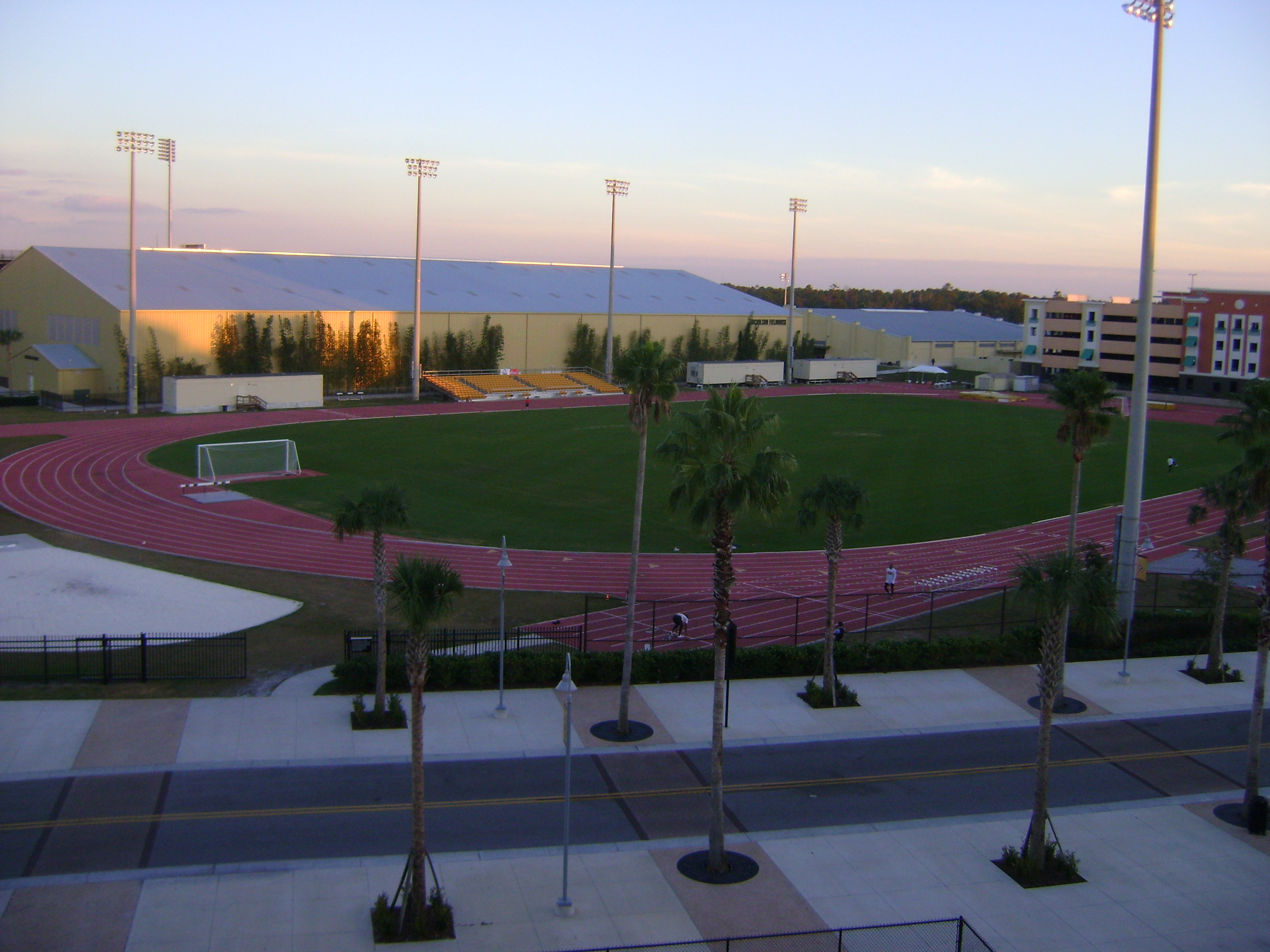
The field and the old stand, built in 2004, still in use.

The stadium was built in 1991, and during the summer of 2004, the track was resurfaced and enhanced. The complex underwent another further renovation in 2008, adding long jump and triple jump pits as well as an expanded throwing area.

In 2011, the stadium was heavily renovated, boasting a 2,000 seat capacity with a new 1,475-seat stand, press box, 7,500 square feet (700 m^{2}) clubhouse, restrooms and new entrance on the west side of the facility. The original 500-seat stand was retained as a visitors' stand. The renovated stadium opened in May 2011.

The soccer field is made of natural grass and measures 347 feet (106 m) x 200 feet (61 m). The complex includes throwing areas for the hammer, discus, shot put, long jump, and triple jump pits.

== International soccer matches ==
UCF Soccer and Track Stadium hosted its first international soccer match on January 16, 2015.

Date	Result	Competition
January 16, 2015	Canada 1–2 Iceland	Friendly
January 19, 2015	Canada 1–1 Iceland	Friendly

== See also ==
- UCF Knights
- University of Central Florida
- University of Central Florida Alumni
