= Memphis Tigers men's soccer =

American college soccer team

- 2022 Memphis Tigers men's soccer team
- Founded: 1982; 44 years ago
- University: University of Memphis
- Head coach: Richard Mulrooney (8th season)
- Conference: American
- Location: Memphis, Tennessee, US
- Stadium: Memphis Soccer & Track Stadium (capacity: 2,042)
- Nickname: Tigers
- Colors: Blue and gray
Home	Away

NCAA tournament appearances
- 1993, 2004, 2023

Conference tournament championships
- 2004

Conference regular season championships
- 2004

The Memphis Tigers men's soccer team is a varsity intercollegiate athletic team of the University of Memphis in Memphis, Tennessee, United States. The team is a full member of the National Collegiate Athletic Association Division I American Conference. Memphis's first men's soccer team was fielded in 1982. The team is coached by Richard Mulrooney and play their home games at the on-campus soccer & track stadium.

== Roster ==
As of Jul 2026

Note: Flags indicate national team as defined under FIFA eligibility rules; some limited exceptions apply. Players may hold more than one non-FIFA nationality.

No.	Pos.	Nation	Player
0	GK	USA	Logan Haddad
00	GK	USA	Noah Kasin
1	GK	DEN	Mathias Christensen
2	DF	CAN	Zackarya Oumamass
3	DF	USA	Daman Sangha
4	DF	HAI	Junior Saint Juste
5	DF	USA	Ethan Cook
6	MF	BRA	Henrique Cruz
7	FW	USA	Miller Lashlee
8	MF	CAN	Saad Chaouki
9	FW	BRA	Renan Syrio
10	FW	USA	Eben McIntyre
11	MF	USA	Keanan Baeder
12	FW	USA	Carson Banham
13	DF	USA	Ryan Ruguaru

No.	Pos.	Nation	Player
14	MF	USA	Thomas Mancuso
15	DF	AUT	Marko Stajnko
16	MF	USA	Anthony Grudko
18	MF	ITA	Alessandro Peruz
19	MF	USA	Ignacio Escamilla
20	MF	USA	Joshua Owens
23	DF	USA	Arlo McIntyre
26	DF	USA	Dino Stavros
27	MF	CAN	Christian Piccolotto
28	MF	SUI	Mathias Krohnstad
29	FW	USA	Ben Mulrooney
30	DF	JPN	Jin Tokishi
34	DF	BAH	Reuben Edgecombe

== Individual achievements ==
=== All-Americans ===
Player	Position	Year(s)
Dayton O'Brien	MF	2004
Mark Sherrod	FW	2011, 2013
Anders Bordoy	MF	2023

=== All-Region ===
Player	Position	Year(s)
Trevor Buckland	FW	1988, 1989
Donal McDonagh	MF	1988
Thomas Ohlmeier	MF	1993
Rogerio Lima	FW	1996, 1997
Sean Fraser	MF	2000, 2001
Andy Metcalf	FW	2003
Dan Dobson	DF	2004
Dayton O'Brien	MF	2003, 2004, 2005
Jamie Gilbert	MF	2006
Kevin Walsh	FW	2006, 2007
Jared Britcher	DF	2007
Adam Montgomery	FW	2007
Michael Coburn	DF	2007, 2008
Liam Collins	FW	2011, 2012
J. J. Greer	DF	2011
Chris Schmidt	DF	2011
Mark Sherrod	FW	2011, 2012, 2013
