= UCF Knights men's soccer =

American college soccer team

- 2026 UCF Knights men's soccer team
- Founded: 1975; 51 years ago
- University: University of Central Florida
- Head coach: Scott Calabrese (10th season)
- Conference: Sun Belt
- Location: Orlando, Florida, US
- Stadium: UCF Soccer and Track Stadium (capacity: 2,000)
- Nickname: UCF Knights
- Colors: Black and gold
Home	Away

NCAA tournament Round of 16
- 2019, 2020

NCAA tournament Round of 32
- 2003, 2004, 2010, 2011, 2018, 2019, 2020, 2023, 2025

NCAA tournament appearances
- 1982, 1983, 2002, 2003, 2004, 2010, 2011, 2018, 2019, 2020, 2023, 2025

Conference tournament championships
- 1979, 1980, 1981, 2002, 2003, 2004, 2020, 2025

Conference regular season championships
- 2003, 2004, 2018, 2019, 2020

The UCF Knights men's soccer team represents the University of Central Florida in National Collegiate Athletic Association (NCAA) Division I. As of the next NCAA men's soccer season in 2023, the Knights compete in the Sun Belt Conference (SBC). This coincides with UCF's July 2023 move from the American Athletic Conference (American; now known as the American Conference), a league in which it had been a member since 2013, to the Big 12 Conference, which sponsors soccer only for women. They play their home games on UCF's main campus east of Orlando, Florida (Note: The main UCF campus has an Orlando mailing address but is in unincorporated Orange County.) at the UCF Soccer and Track Stadium. The Knights are currently led by head coach Scott Calabrese.

== History ==
The Knights soccer program began in 1975 under Jim Rudy. The Knights went 10–4–1 that year, defeating St. Leo in their first match 8–0. In 1984, the team made the move to Division I. The Knights were nationally ranked for the first time during the 2010 season, and rose to a program high of No. 1 in the country during the 2023 season.

After UCF announced its move to the Big 12, it was forced to find a new home for men's soccer because the Big 12 only sponsors soccer for women. School officials expected to join the SBC, which reinstated men's soccer for the 2022 season with a lineup that significantly included the only then-current Big 12 member with a men's soccer program (West Virginia) and both Southeastern Conference schools that sponsor varsity men's soccer (Kentucky and South Carolina). This was confirmed on June 21, 2022, when the SBC officially announced UCF's 2023 arrival as a men's soccer member. It created two derbies: the Big 12 Derby against West Virginia, and the Big 12-SEC Challenge featuring both with Kentucky and South Carolina.

The Knights have an all-time record of 422–330–76.

== Players ==
=== Current roster ===
As of October 2, 2026

Note: Flags indicate national team as defined under FIFA eligibility rules; some limited exceptions apply. Players may hold more than one non-FIFA nationality.

No.	Pos.	Nation	Player
1	GK	GER	Timo Haböck
2	DF	FRA	Leny Jérôme
3	DF	FRA	Gwendal Degorce
4	DF	ENG	Jem Hewlett
5	MF	FRA	Younes Boudinar
6	MF	USA	Joey Mueller
7	FW	JPN	Seiryu Ono
8	MF	NOR	Petter Wingsternaes
9	FW	ENG	Christian Hatley
11	FW	ESP	Alex Partera
12	DF	USA	Gabi Velez
13	GK	CAN	Matisse Hébert
14	MF	GHA	Joachim Kyei
15	MF	LBR	Abraham Monsee

No.	Pos.	Nation	Player
16	DF	CRC	Timothy Arias
17	MF	FRA	Hugo Vogel
18	FW	USA	Drew Hansen
19	FW	ESP	Izán Martínez
20	MF	FRA	Hugo Vien
21	MF	USA	Finn Calloway
23	FW	ESP	Erik Vázquez
26	MF	JPN	Sena Yamamoto
28	MF	KEN	Kenn Muendo
29	DF	JPN	Takahiro Fujita
30	GK	USA	Kai Longanecker
32	DF	ESP	Germán Moreno
33	DF	USA	Mateus Dejesus
36	FW	USA	Alex Naranjo

=== Notable alumni ===
UCF has produced a number of notable soccer stars. Most notably, Eric Vasquez, Sean Johnson and Ryan McIntosh. Vasquez, who made his professional soccer debut with the Columbus Crew in Major League Soccer, later played for Miami FC in the United Soccer Leagues' First Division and the Orlando Sharks of the Major Indoor Soccer League before retiring due to injury. Former Knights Goalkeeper Ryan McIntosh initially played with D.C. United, and after a year with the D.C. United Reserve team, McIntosh signed with the Atlanta Silverbacks of USL Division One, where he led the team to the league final. Both players were a part of the 2004 Central Florida Kraze amateur soccer team that won the Premier Development League's championship by defeating the Boulder Rapids Reserves, 1–0 at the UCF soccer stadium. In 2019, two of players got selected in the MLS SuperDraft that took place in Chicago.Striker Cal Jennings was picked number 15th in the first round by the FC Dallas and Defender Jonathan Dean got selected 32nd in the second round of the draft by Orlando City Soccer Club.

Sean Johnson, another former UCF goalkeeper, joined the Chicago Fire of Major League Soccer in 2010. He was a member of the United States U-20 men's national soccer team which qualified for the 2009 FIFA U-20 World Cup in Egypt.

== Coaches ==
=== All-time coaches ===
Tenure	Coach	Seasons	Record	Pct.
1975–1988	Jim Rudy	14	139–62–17	.638
1989–1992	Bill Barker	4	27–39–4	.386
1993–2004	Bob Winch	12	112–100–16	.491
2005–2006	Brent Erwin	2	13–17–3	.394
2007–2016	Bryan Cunningham	6	57–53–20	.515
2017–present	Scott Calabrese	3	36–12–7	.718
Totals	6 coaches	45 seasons	384–287–71	.565
Records are through the conclusion of the 2013 NCAA Season.

== Seasons ==
Season	Coach	Record		Notes
Season	Coach	Overall	Conference	Notes
Independent
1975	Jim Rudy	10–4–1	—	
1976	Jim Rudy	15–1–1	—	
Sunshine State
1977	Jim Rudy	11–4–0	4–0–0	
1978	Jim Rudy	4–8–0	1–2–0	
1979	Jim Rudy	8–7–0	3–1–0	Sunshine State Tournament Champions
1980	Jim Rudy	12–3–1	3–0–0	Sunshine State Tournament Champions
1981	Jim Rudy	10–3–1	3–1–1	Sunshine State Tournament Champions
1982	Jim Rudy	10–4–2	4–3–0	NCAA Division II Tournament
1983	Jim Rudy	12–4–3	4–2–0	NCAA Division II Tournament
Independent
1984	Jim Rudy	8–5–3	—	
1985	Jim Rudy	10–2–3	—	
1986	Jim Rudy	9–5–1	—	
1987	Jim Rudy	10–8–0	—	
1988	Jim Rudy	10–4–1	—	
1989	Bill Barker	6–10–2	—	
1990	Bill Barker	8–10–0	—	
1991	Bill Barker	5–13–0	—	
1992	Bill Barker	8–6–2	—	
Trans America Athletic Conference/Atlantic Sun Conference
1993	Bob Winch	4–10–1	3–4–0	
1994	Bob Winch	9–10–2	2–3–1	
1995	Bob Winch	5–11–1	2–3–1	
1996	Bob Winch	10–7–1	4–2–0	TAAC East Division Champions
1997	Bob Winch	12–6–0	3–5–0	
1998	Bob Winch	13–7–0	6–1–0	
1999	Bob Winch	12–7–0	3–3–0	
2000	Bob Winch	2–14–3	1–4–1	
2001	Bob Winch	12–7–0	4–3–0	
2002	Bob Winch	10–8–3	5–2–1	Atlantic Sun Tournament Champions; NCAA First round
2003	Bob Winch	12–6–3	6–2–1	Atlantic Sun Regular Season and Tournament Champions; NCAA Second round
2004	Bob Winch	11–7–2	7–2–0	Atlantic Sun Regular Season and Tournament Champions; NCAA Second round
Conference USA
2005	Brent Erwin	7–8–1	2–6–1	
2006	Brent Erwin	6–9–2	3–3–2	
2007	Bryan Cunningham	4–12–2	0–6–2	
2008	Bryan Cunningham	7–11–1	3–4–1	
2009	Bryan Cunningham	6–7–3	2–5–1	
2010	Bryan Cunningham	12–5–3	4–1–3	NCAA Second round
2011	Bryan Cunningham	12–6–3	4–3–1	NCAA Second round
2012	Bryan Cunningham	8–7–3	5–3–0	
American Athletic
2013	Bryan Cunningham	8–5–5	4–1–3	
2014	Bryan Cunningham	2–10–6	1–3–4	
2015	Bryan Cunningham	7–8–2	3–4–1	
2016	Bryan Cunningham	5–11–0	5–3–0	
2017	Scott Calabrese	8–6–2	4–2–1	
2018	Scott Calabrese	13–3–3	5–1–1	American Regular Season Champions; NCAA Second round
2019	Scott Calabrese	15–3–2	6–0–1	American Regular Season Champions; NCAA Third round
2020–21	Scott Calabrese	9–4–1	7–3–0	American Regular Season & Tournament Champions; NCAA Third round
2021	Scott Calabrese	9–8–0	6–4–0	
2022	Scott Calabrese	6–7–0	3–6–0	
Sun Belt
2023	Scott Calabrese	10–4–2	6–2–1	NCAA Second round
2024	Scott Calabrese	7–6–3	5–4–0	
Totals		439–340–81	144–108–29	860 games (.558)
Records are through the conclusion of the 2024 NCAA season.

== Stadium ==
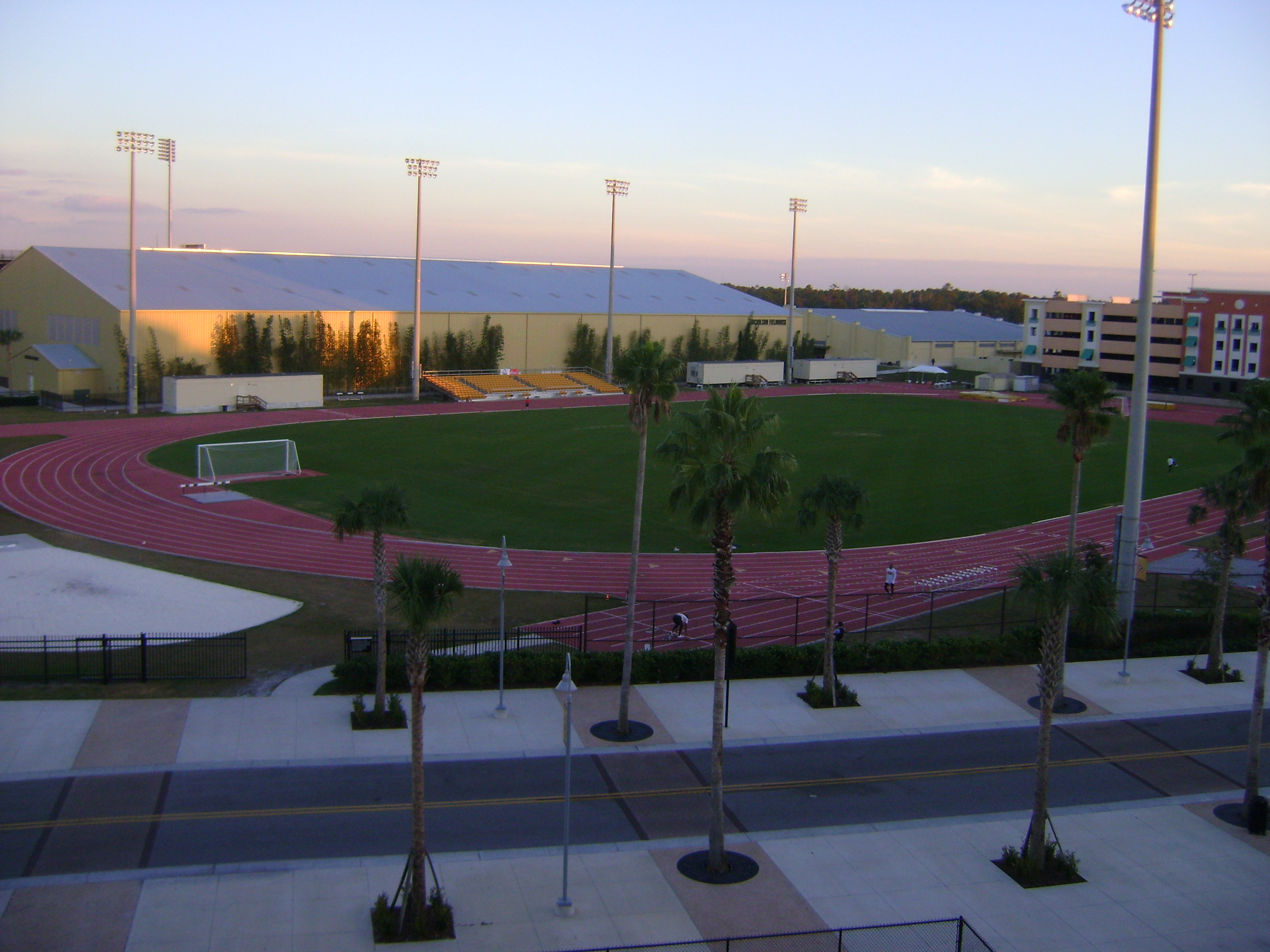
UCF Soccer and Track Stadium, home venue

The Knights play their home games at the UCF Soccer and Track Stadium which is a part of Knights Plaza, located on the north end of UCF's main campus east of Orlando, Florida. The soccer field is made of natural grass and measures 347 feet (106 m) x 200 feet (61 m).

In 2011, the stadium was heavily renovated, boasting a 2,000 seat capacity with a new 1,475-seat stand, press box, 7,500 square feet (700 m^{2}) clubhouse, restrooms and new entrance on the west side of the facility. The original 500-seat stand was retained as a visitors' stand.

== See also ==
- UCF Knights women's soccer
- List of University of Central Florida alumni
