= Mike Berticelli Award =

The Mike Berticelli Excellence in Coaching Education Award or the Mike Berticelli Award is a national recognition given by United Soccer Coaches to present to an individual in the USC Academy staff who was provided "positive contributions to the game of soccer and excellence in coaching education". The award is named in Mike Berticelli who was the head coach of the Notre Dame Fighting Irish men's soccer program and died in 2000 while serving as the United Soccer Coaches' (then National Soccer Coaches Association of America) Vice President of Education.

The award was first given following the 2000 NCAA men's and women's soccer season to Jim Lennox.

== Award winners ==
Season	Winner	Affiliation	Reference
2025	John Fitzgerald	American Soccer Club New York	
2024	Erik Oman	United Soccer Coaches Instructor	
2023	Rob Herringer		
2022	Felicity Day	United Soccer Coaches Instructor	
2021	Deborah Raber	Massachusetts College of Liberal Arts	
2020	Neil Hull		
2019	Roy Dunshee		
2018	Jason Neumann	Vestavia Hills Soccer Club	
2017	Cyndi Goodwin		
2016	Bill Steffen	Ohio State Buckeyes women's soccer	
2015	Paul Marco	Binghamton Bearcats men's soccer	
2014	Paul Payne	Bloomsburg Huskies men's soccer	
2013	Kim Sutton	Chico State Wildcats women's soccer	
2012	Laura Kerrigan	NC State Wolfpack women's soccer	
2011	Barry Gorman	Penn State Nittany Lions men's soccer	
2010	Nancy Feldman	Boston University Terriers women's soccer	
2009	Dave Saward	Middlebury Panthers men's soccer	
2008	Peter Broadley	FC Carolina Alliance	
2007	Schellas Hyndman	SMU Mustangs men's soccer	
2006	Jeff Vennell	Cranbrook Cranes boys' soccer	
2005	Doug Williamson	Augusta Prep Cavaliers	
2004	Peter Gooding	Amherst Mammoths men's soccer	
2003	George Perry	Monmouth Hawks men's soccer	
2002	Tony Waiters	NSCAA Goalkeeping Institute	
2001	Anson Dorrance	North Carolina Tar Heels women's soccer	
2000	Jim Lennox	Hartwick Hawks women's soccer	

== See also ==
- List of sports awards honoring women
