= 1937 Penn State Nittany Lions men's soccer team =

Penn State Nittany Lions men's soccer 1937 season

1937 Penn State Nittany Lions men's soccer

ISFA, Co-National Champion
- Conference: Eastern Intercollegiate Soccer Football Association
- Record: 8–0–1 ( Eastern Intercollegiate Soccer Football Association)
- Head coach: William Jeffrey (12 season)
- Home stadium: New Beaver Field

The 1937 Penn State Nittany Lions men's soccer team represented Pennsylvania State University during the 1937 season playing in the Intercollegiate Soccer League. It was the program's 27th season fielding a men's varsity soccer team. The 1937 season is William Jeffrey's 12 year at the helm.

== Background ==
The 1937 season was the Nittany Lions' 27th season as a varsity soccer program, and their 12th season playing as a part of the Intercollegiate Soccer Football Association. The team was led by 12th year head coach, William Jeffrey, who had previously served as the head coach for the semi-professional soccer team, Altoona Works.

The Nittany Lions finished out the 1937 season sharing the Eastern Intercollegiate Soccer Association title with Springfield College. Concluding 1937 campaign with a record of 8–0–1, Penn State notched its 5th consecutive undefeated season.

== Squad ==
=== Departures ===
Name	Reason for departure
Bill McEwan	Graduated
Phil Barnes	Graduated
Frank Osterlund	Graduated

=== Roster ===
Note: Flags indicate national team as defined under FIFA eligibility rules. Players may hold more than one non-FIFA nationality.

No.	Pos.	Player	Nation
—	GK	Hank Schweitzer	
—	GK	Dick Haag	
—	DF	Bob Schuler	
—	DF	Bill Borda	
—	DF	Bill Dave Weddell	
—	MF	Eddie Mandel	
—	MF	Fres Spyker	
—	MF	Walt Painter	
—	MF	Frank Megrail	
—	MF	Woody Hosterman	
—	MF	Woody Corman	
—	MF	George Merwin	
—	FW	Sol Miehoff (captain)	
—	FW	Carl Waeker	
—	FW	Dick Wilde	
—	FW	Sam Davies	
—	FW	Sam Rankin	
—	FW	Werner Lange	
—	FW	Harry Peifer	
—	FW	Jack Mallory	
—		Selly Cohn	

== Schedule ==
Date Time, TV	Rank^{#}	Opponent^{#}	Result	Record	Site (Attendance) City, State
Regular season
October 2; 1:30 p.m.		Gettysburg	W 5–0	1–0–0	New Beaver Field; State College, PA
October 9; 1:00 p.m.		Bucknell	W 6–0	2–0–0	New Beaver Field; State College, PA
October 16		at Yale	W 2–0	3–0–0	New Haven, CT
October 23		at Temple	W 2–1	4–0–0	Philadelphia, PA
October 30; 2:30 p.m.		Syracuse	W 2–0	5–0–0	New Beaver Field; State College, PA
November 3		at Army	T 0–0	6–0–1	West Point, NY
November 13		at Navy	W 3–0	7–0–1	Annapolis, MD
November 20; 2:30 p.m.		Western Maryland	W 9–0	8–0–1	New Beaver Field; State College, PA
*Non-conference game. ^{#}Rankings from United Soccer Coaches. (#) Tournament seedings in parentheses.

== Honors and awards ==
Award	Name
All-Eastern Team	(United States) Bob Schuler
All-Eastern Team	(United States) Fres Spyker
All-Eastern Team	(United States) Eddie Mandel
All-Eastern Team	(United States) Sol Miehoff
All-Eastern Team	(United States) Taylor
