= 1938 Penn State Nittany Lions men's soccer team =

Penn State Nittany Lions men's soccer 1938 season

1938 Penn State Nittany Lions men's soccer

ISFA, National Champion
- Conference: Eastern Intercollegiate Soccer Football Association
- Record: 8–0–0 ( Eastern Intercollegiate Soccer Football Association)
- Head coach: William Jeffrey (13 season)
- Home stadium: New Beaver Field

The 1938 Penn State Nittany Lions men's soccer team represented Pennsylvania State University during the 1938 season playing in the Intercollegiate Soccer League. It was the program's 28th season fielding a men's varsity soccer team. The 1938 season is William Jeffrey's 13th at the helm.

== Background ==
The 1938 season was the Nittany Lions' 28th season as a varsity soccer program, and their 12th season playing as a part of the Intercollegiate Soccer Football Association. The team was led by 13th year head coach, William Jeffrey, who had previously served as the head coach for the semi-professional soccer team, Altoona Works.

In their third game of the season the Nittany Lions defeated Western Maryland 12-0, marking the largest win in Penn State soccer history. Penn State was awarded an undisputed national championship title from the Intercollegiate Soccer Football Association after finishing the 1938 season 8–0–0. The team was able to tally 35 goals and hold their opposition to 6 goals. At the end of the 1938 season the team had stretched their undefeated streak to 45 games. Three Nittany Lions were tapped as all-east soccer team selections.

== Squad ==
=== Departures ===
Name	Reason for departure
Sol Miehoff	Graduated
Bill Borda	Graduated

=== Roster ===
Note: Flags indicate national team as defined under FIFA eligibility rules. Players may hold more than one non-FIFA nationality.

No.	Pos.	Player	Nation
—	MF	Fred Spyker (captain)	United States
—	DF	Bob Schuler	United States
—	GK	Dick Haag	United States
—	MF	Frank Megrail	United States
—	MF	Fred Spyker	United States
—	GK	Walt Hosterman	United States
—	GK	Earl Spelling	United States
—	GK	Dave Meycis	United States
—	GK	Walt Painter	United States
—	GK	Bob Olmstead	United States
—	GK	Frank Megrail	United States
—	FW	Carl Wacker	United States
—	FW	Solly Miehoft	United States
—	FW	Ed Mallory	United States
—	GK	Van Kirk	United States
—		Gus Biggott	Venezuela
—		Dario Bedout	Colombia
—		Van Kirk	United States
—		Joe Gift	United States
—		Al Kies	United States
—		Bob Ernest	United States
—		Jack Good	United States

== Schedule ==
Date Time, TV	Rank^{#}	Opponent^{#}	Result	Record	Site (Attendance) City, State
Regular season
October 1; 1:00 p.m.		Gettysburg	W 4–0	1–0–0	New Beaver Field; State College, PA
October 8; 1:00 p.m.		Bucknell	W 1–0	2–0–0	New Beaver Field; State College, PA
October 15; 2:30 p.m.		Western Maryland	W 12–0	3–0–0	New Beaver Field; State College, PA
October 22; 2:30 p.m.		at Syracuse	W 5–0	4–0–0	Syracuse, NY
October 26		at Army	W 1–0	5–0–0	West Point, NY
October 27		at Brown	W 7–3	6–0–0	Providence, RI
November 5; 1:00 p.m.		Navy	W 1–0	7–0–0	New Beaver Field; State College, PA
November 11		Temple	W 4–3	8–0–0	New Beaver Field; State College, PA
*Non-conference game. ^{#}Rankings from United Soccer Coaches. (#) Tournament seedings in parentheses.

== Honors and awards ==
Award	Name
All-Eastern Team	(United States) Bob Schuler
All-Eastern Team	(United States) Walt Hosterman
All-Eastern Team	(Venezuela) Gus Bigott
