= Ken Hosterman =

American soccer coach

Personal information
- Full name: Kenneth Frederick Hosterman
- Date of birth: November 22, 1924
- Place of birth: State College, Pennsylvania
- Date of death: April 7, 2005 (aged 80)
- Place of death: State College, Pennsylvania

College career
Years	Team	Apps	(Gls)
1946–1950	Penn State		

Managerial career
- 1953–1967: Penn State
Medal record
Penn State
Winner	ISFA National Championship	1954
Winner	ISFA National Championship	1955

Ken Hosterman (November 22, 1924 – April 7, 2005) was the head coach of the Penn State Nittany Lions men's soccer team from 1953 to 1967. During his tenure as head coach Hosterman won two ISFA national championships in 1954 and 1955, Coach of the Year award by the National Soccer Coaches Association in 1955. Hosterman served as a 2nd lieutenant in the U.S. Army Air Corps during World War II in the 455th Bombardment Group. Hosterman played varsity soccer and baseball while attending Penn State University.

== Career ==
Hosterman played soccer at Penn State in 1946 and 1947. He was one of four brothers to have played soccer at Penn State. Two brothers, Walter and Ralph, were team captains and First-Team All-America selections. Ken Hosterman's career was cut short when he broke his leg during his second year.

Hosterman began his coaching career at Penn State in 1953 succeeding Bill Jeffrey, who had been his coach. During his 15-season tenure as head coach of the Nittany Lions Hosterman recorded 72 wins, 60 losses and 5 ties. His 1954 and 1955 teams were undefeated and untied, winning an outright national championship in 1954 and sharing the title in 1955. Hosterman stepped down as Penn State's head coach after the conclusion of the 1967 season after accepting a position within the Penn State athletics program becoming the director of the Faculty-Staff Recreational and Fitness Program.

Between 1950 and 1989, Hosterman served as an assistant professor in physical education at Penn State and was the athletic program's ticket manager between 1972 and 1976.

== Military ==
Hosterman enlisted in the U.S. Army on March 16, 1943 and was deployed during World War II. He served as a U.S. Army Air Corps 2nd lieutenant in the 455th Bombardment Group, flying 35 missions as a navigator in the Cerignola region of Italy from October 1944 to June 1945. Hosterman received the Air Medal with 3 Oak Leaf Clusters for his service.

== Death and legacy ==
Hosterman died in State College in April 2005. In September 2005, on the 50th anniversary of Penn State's national championship, a reunion of the survivors was held where Hosterman's granddaughter Stephanie Smith sang the national anthem.

== Honours ==
=== College ===
Penn State

- Intercollegiate Soccer Football Association College Soccer National Champions: 1954, 1955
