= 1934 Penn State Nittany Lions men's soccer team =

Penn State Nittany Lions men's soccer 1934 season

1934 Penn State Nittany Lions men's soccer
- Conference: Eastern Intercollegiate Soccer Football Association
- Record: 6–0–1 ( Eastern Intercollegiate Soccer Football Association)
- Head coach: William Jeffrey (9th season)
- Home stadium: New Beaver Field

The 1934 Penn State Nittany Lions men's soccer team represented Pennsylvania State University during the 1934 season playing in the Intercollegiate Soccer League. It was the program's 24th season fielding a men's varsity soccer team. The 1934 season is William Jeffrey's ninth year at the helm.

== Background ==
The 1934 season was the Nittany Lions' 24th season as a varsity soccer program, and their 9th season playing as a part of the Intercollegiate Soccer Football Association. The team was led by 9th year head coach, William Jeffrey, who had previously served as the head coach for the semi-professional soccer team, Altoona Works.

At the beginning of the 1934 season a new rule was implemented by the Intercollegiate Soccer Football Association to allow for the re-substitutions of three players instead on the previous one. This allowed three players that had previously been brought off the field and replaced to return to play.

The Nittany Lions engaged in a tour of six pre-season exhibition matches in Scotland through 6 weeks during August and September 1934. The team was invited to compete with amateur sides by the Scottish Amateur Football Association becoming the first American soccer team schedule a Scottish tour. The trip was officially sanctioned by the American Amateur Football Association and approved by the Intercollegiate Soccer Football Association. The matches were scheduled by officials at Leith Athletic F.C. Six of team the Nittany Lion's faced had captured a National Amateur Championship in Scotland. The Nittany Lions set sail for Scotland on August 11 of 1934 aboard the RMS Cameronia.

Penn State was suspended for championship contention by the Intercollegiate Soccer Football Association in January 1935. The team was suspended for using players from other schools as well as a coach in their exhibition matches in Scotland. Penn State's head coach Bill Jeffrey defended its actions by stating players on the trip had become sick and there was a need for substitutes to prevent scheduled games from being canceled. The team was reinstated for the 1935 season championship and no other sanctions were put on the team.

== Squad ==
=== Roster ===
Note: Flags indicate national team as defined under FIFA eligibility rules. Players may hold more than one non-FIFA nationality.

No.	Pos.	Player	Nation
—	GK	Ben Palmer	
—	DF	Dick Sigel	
—	DF	Jack Binns	
—	DF	Al Daykin	
—	MF	Jack Fletcher	
—	MF	Eddie Long	
—	MF	Marple Ambler	
—	MF	Eddie Finzel	
—	FW	Bill McEwan	
—	FW	Joe Bielicki	
—	FW	Woodie Gorman	
—		Frank Osterland	
—		Don Masters	
—		Bob Sallas	
—		Doyle Creveling	
—		Frank Osterland	

== Schedule ==
Date Time, TV	Rank^{#}	Opponent^{#}	Result	Record	Site (Attendance) City, State
Pre-season
August 25		Leith Athletic F.C.^	L 6–4	0–0–0	Edinburgh, Scotland
August 27		Gala Fairydean F.C.^	L 12–7	0–0–0	Netherdale, Scotland
August 29		Caledonian F.C.^	L 10–6	0–0–0	Telford Street Park; Inverness, Scotland
September 1		Elgin City F.C.^	L 5–4	0–0–0	Borough Briggs; Elgin, Scotland
September 5		Falkirk Amateurs F.C.^	L 10–1	0–0–0	Falkirk, Scotland
September 8		Greenock Academy^	L 5–2	0–0–0	Greenock, Scotland
Regular season
October 13; 12:30 p.m.		Gettysburg	W –	1–0–0	New Beaver Field; State College, PA
October 20		at Temple	W 1–0	2–0–0	Philadelphia, PA
October 26; 4:00 p.m.		Lafayette	W 7–0	3–0–0	New Beaver Field; State College, PA
November 3		at Syracuse	W 3–1	4–0–0	Piety Hill; Syracuse, NY
November 10		at Springfield College	T 1-1	4–0–1	South Field Pitch (2000); Springfield, MA
November 17; 12:30 p.m.		at Navy	W 7–1	5–0–1	New Beaver Field; State College, PA
November 24; 2:00 p.m.		Dickenson	W 10–1	6–0–1	New Beaver Field; State College, PA
*Non-conference game. ^{#}Rankings from United Soccer Coaches. (#) Tournament seedings in parentheses.

^Exhibition match
