= 1933 Penn State Nittany Lions men's soccer team =

Penn State Nittany Lions men's soccer 1933 season

1933 Penn State Nittany Lions men's soccer

ISFA, Co-National Champion
- Conference: Eastern Intercollegiate Soccer Football Association
- Record: 6–0–0 ( Eastern Intercollegiate Soccer Football Association)
- Head coach: William Jeffrey (8th season)
- Home stadium: New Beaver Field

The 1933 Penn State Nittany Lions men's soccer team represented Pennsylvania State University during the 1933 season playing in the Intercollegiate Soccer League. It was the program's 23rd season fielding a men's varsity soccer team. The 1933 season is William Jeffrey's eighth year at the helm.

== Background ==
The 1933 season was the Nittany Lions' 23rd season as a varsity soccer program, and their 8th season playing as a part of the Intercollegiate Soccer Football Association. The team was led by 8th year head coach, William Jeffrey, who had previously served as the head coach for the semi-professional soccer team, Altoona Works.

The Nittany Lions team was invited by the Italian Government to be the United States representative in the 1933 International University Games in Turin, Italy. The team declined the invitation.

Penn State shared the 1933 Intercollegiate Soccer Football Association national championship title with Penn.

== Squad ==
=== Departures ===
Name	Reason for departure
Hank Hartzler	Graduated
Al Daykin	Graduated
Frank Evans	Graduated
Bob Young	Graduated
Frank Tully	Graduated
Eddie Knecht	Graduated
Chuck Musser	Graduated

== Schedule ==
Date Time, TV	Rank^{#}	Opponent^{#}	Result	Record	Site (Attendance) City, State
Regular season
October 14; 1:00 p.m.		Temple	W 4–0	1–0–0	New Beaver Field; State College, PA
October 21		at Navy	W 3–1	2–0–0	Annapolis, MD
October 28; 2:00 p.m.		Lafayette	W 6–0	3–0–0	New Beaver Field; State College, PA
November 4; 2:00 p.m.		Syracuse	W 4–0	4–0–0	New Beaver Field; State College, PA
November 18; 10:30 a.m.		Illinois	W 4–0	5–0–0	New Beaver Field; State College, PA
November 25; 2:00 p.m.		Springfield College	W 2-0	6–0–0	New Beaver Field (2000); State College, PA
*Non-conference game. ^{#}Rankings from United Soccer Coaches. (#) Tournament seedings in parentheses.
