= 1935 Penn State Nittany Lions men's soccer team =

Penn State Nittany Lions men's soccer 1935 season

1935 Penn State Nittany Lions men's soccer
- Conference: Eastern Intercollegiate Soccer Football Association
- Record: 7–0–0 ( Eastern Intercollegiate Soccer Football Association)
- Head coach: William Jeffrey (10th season)
- Home stadium: New Beaver Field

The 1935 Penn State Nittany Lions men's soccer team represented Pennsylvania State University during the 1935 season playing in the Eastern Intercollegiate Soccer League. It was the program's 25th season fielding a men's varsity soccer team. The 1935 season is William Jeffrey's tenth year at the helm.

== Background ==
The 1935 season was the Nittany Lions' 25th season as a varsity soccer program, and their 10th season playing as a part of the Intercollegiate Soccer Football Association. The team was led by 10th year head coach, William Jeffrey, who had previously served as the head coach for the semi-professional soccer team, Altoona Works.

The Nittany Lions finished their season undefeated and unscored on through seven games. Penn State extended their unbeaten streak that began during the 1932 season to 21 matches. Penn State was invited at the end of its season to face west coast soccer champions San Francisco University for a National Intercollegiate Association Football Championship title game. The team did not make the trip to California due to budgetary issues.

The Nittany Lions were denied the Eastern Intercollegiate Soccer Football Association title due to the team not playing four active members of the ISFA, the team instead received an honorable mention by the association. Penn State's schedule originally featured four active members but Syracuse was later suspended for the 1935 season due to only playing 3 league contests in 1934. The team instead received an honorable mention by the association. As a fix to future scheduling issues the association removed its four active member game mandate and instead would choose a champion based on strength of schedule. This change also made every school actively participating in the association into an active member.

== Schedule ==
Date Time, TV	Rank^{#}	Opponent^{#}	Result	Record	Site (Attendance) City, State
Regular season
October 12; 1:00 p.m.		Gettysburg	W 4–0	1–0–0	New Beaver Field (2500); State College, PA
October 19; 1:00 p.m.		Temple	W 4–0	2–0–0	New Beaver Field; State College, PA
October 26; 2:00 p.m.		Lafayette	W 1–0	3–0–0	New Beaver Field; State College, PA
October 26		at Army	W 6–0	4–0–0	West Point, NY
November 2		Syracuse	W 4–0	5–0–0	New Beaver Field; State College, PA
November 9; 1:00 p.m.		at Springfield College	W 1-0	6–0–0	South Field Pitch (2000); Springfield, MA
November 16; 11:00 a.m.		at Navy	W 2–0	7–0–0	Annapolis, MD
*Non-conference game. ^{#}Rankings from United Soccer Coaches. (#) Tournament seedings in parentheses.
