= 2nd Soccer Bowl =

The 2nd Soccer Bowl may refer to:

- 1951 Soccer Bowl, the second men's college soccer Soccer Bowl
- NASL Final 1970, the second championship series of the original North American Soccer League
- Soccer Bowl '76, the second championship game of the original North American Soccer League that used the "Soccer Bowl" moniker
- Soccer Bowl 2012, the second championship series of the second North American Soccer League
