= 3rd Soccer Bowl =

The 3rd Soccer Bowl may refer to:

- 1952 Soccer Bowl, the third men's college soccer Soccer Bowl
- NASL Final 1971, the third championship series of the original North American Soccer League
- Soccer Bowl '77, the third championship game of the original North American Soccer League that used the "Soccer Bowl" moniker
- Soccer Bowl 2013, the third championship game of the second North American Soccer League
