= 1st Soccer Bowl =

The 1st Soccer Bowl may refer to:

- 1950 Soccer Bowl, the first men's college soccer Soccer Bowl
- NASL Final 1968, the first championship series of the original North American Soccer League
- Soccer Bowl '75, the first championship game of the original North American Soccer League that used the "Soccer Bowl" moniker
- Soccer Bowl 2011, the first championship series of the second North American Soccer League
