= Soccer Bowl (1950–1952) =

American soccer championship

- Organizer(s): ISFA
- Founded: 1949
- Abolished: 1952
- Teams: 2
- Last champion: Temple
- Most championships: Penn State (2)

The Soccer Bowl was a championship match to determine the men's college soccer national champion prior to the NCAA Division I Men's Soccer Tournament. The series was played from 1950 until 1952. The first two bowls were played at a neutral venue in St. Louis, Missouri while the third and final bowl was played in San Francisco, California.

== Background ==
Association football, or soccer, had been played at the American collegiate level under association football codes since at least the late 1860s, with variations of a kicking game being played since the mid-1850s. Organized collegiate soccer did not formally occur in the United States until the arrival of the Intercollegiate Soccer Football League, which began during the 1904–05 season. The ISFL determined national championships for college programs from 1905 until 1925, and from 1926 until 1940 the Intercollegiate Soccer Football Association determined national champions. These championship titles were determined by a selection committee and were largely subjective. These championships are not formally recognized by the NCAA as legitimate national championship claims.

Throughout World War II and into the late 1940s, the ISFL did not claim any national championships, although several college programs with undefeated records, or teams atop the NSCAA poll claimed national championships during this time, causing numerous programs to stake championship claims in the same year. After World War II, the ISFA began declaring national championships, which drew ire from programs that felt they deserved a national championship title, but were not considered by the ISFA committee.

The goal of the Soccer Bowl was to take the highest ranked NSCAA and ISFA teams to have them play a one off match at a neutral venue. The concept of a neutral venue and titling the match as a "bowl" was borrowed from the bowl game system that college American football uses.

== History ==
The first Soccer Bowl was played on January 1, 1950, to determine the champion of the 1949 ISFA season. At the end of the 1949 season, the ISFA declared Penn State and San Francisco dual national champions, and both programs agreed to play each other in St. Louis for the inaugural Soccer Bowl. The match ended in a 2-2 draw thanks to a late, and controversial, tying penalty kick in stoppage time.

In December 1950, the second Soccer Bowl was held, determining the champion for the 1950 ISFA season. The match was played between Penn State and Purdue, but much confusion around the legitimacy of the game surrounded and marred the bowl. San Francisco, repeating as the West Coast champion, was unable to make the trip to St. Louis. In an inexplicable decision, the second place team from the Midwest Conference, was sent to St. Louis (in place of conference champion Wheaton) to play the East Coast champion, Penn State in the Soccer Bowl. Penn State won the Bowl 3-1, but this left unclear the question of who was really best, since San Francisco was never matched against them. Furthermore, West Chester stake a claim as national champion which further added to the confusion, raising serious questions about the bowl's viability.

== Finals ==
Ed.	Year	Winner	Score	Runner-up	Venue	City	Winning coach	Ref.
1	1950	Penn State (1)	2–2	– (Note: Both teams were declared winners with no extra time or penalties to define a champion.)	Public Schools Stadium	St. Louis	Bill Jeffrey	
1	1950	San Francisco (1)	2–2	–	Public Schools Stadium	St. Louis	Gus Donoghue	
2	1951	Penn State (2)	3–1	Purdue	Public Schools Stadium	St. Louis	Bill Jeffrey	
3	1952	Temple (1)	2–0	San Francisco	Kezar Stadium	San Francisco	Pete Leaness	

== See also ==
- NCAA Division I Men's Soccer Tournament
- Intercollegiate Soccer Football Association
- College soccer
- Soccer in St. Louis
