= 1929 Penn State Nittany Lions men's soccer team =

Penn State Nittany Lions men's soccer 1929 season

1929 Penn State Nittany Lions men's soccer

ISFA League, National Champion
- Conference: Intercollegiate Soccer Football Association
- Record: 6–0–1 (5–0–1 ISFA)
- Head coach: William Jeffrey (4th season)
- Home stadium: New Beaver Field

The 1929 Penn State Nittany Lions men's soccer team represented Pennsylvania State University during the 1929 season playing in the Intercollegiate Soccer League. It was the program's 19th season fielding a men's varsity soccer team. The 1929 season is William Jeffrey's fourth year at the helm.

== Background ==
The 1929 season was the Nittany Lions' 19th season as a varsity soccer program, and their 4th season playing in the Intercollegiate Soccer Football Association League. The team was led by fourth year head coach, William Jeffrey, who had previously served as the head coach for the semi-professional soccer team, Altoona Works.

The Nittany Lions were crowned National Champions by the Intercollegiate Soccer Football Association and won the Intercollegiate Soccer League. This was their second title win all time and second title under the tenure of William Jeffrey. The team was the only in the league to remain undefeated beating out Penn, Yale and Harvard for the title.

Seven members of the 1929 Nittany Lion squad received All-American recognitions.

== Player movement ==
=== Departures ===
Name	Reason for departure
Dick Marshall	Signed by Bethlehem Steel F.C.
Raymond Vyverberg	Died, automobile accident.

== Schedule ==
Date Time, TV	Rank^{#}	Opponent^{#}	Result	Record	Site (Attendance) City, State
Regular season
October 19; 1:00 p.m.		Haverford	W 2-1	1–0–0 (1–0–0)	New Beaver Field; State College, PA
October 25		at Syracuse	W 4–0	2–0–0 (2–0–0)	Archbold Stadium; Syracuse, NY
October 26		at Cornell	T 1–1	2–0–1 (2–0–1)	Ithaca, NY
November 2*; 2:00 p.m.		Western Maryland	W 5–1	3–0–1 (2–0–1)	New Beaver Field; State College, PA
November 9; 11:30 a.m.		Penn	W 3–1	4–0–1 (3–0–1)	New Beaver Field; State College, PA
November 16; 1:00 p.m.		at Lafayette	W 3-0	5–0–1 (4–0–1)	New Beaver Field; State College, PA
November 23		at Navy	W 2-0	6–0–1 (5–0–1)	Annapolis, MD
*Non-conference game. ^{#}Rankings from United Soccer Coaches. (#) Tournament seedings in parentheses.
