= Barry Gorman =

American soccer coach

Personal information
- Place of birth: Belfast, Northern Ireland

Youth career
- Years: Team
- 1973: Stranmillis College

Managerial career
- 1977: Lock Haven Bald Eagles (assistant)
- 1978–1984: ELCO Raiders
- 1984: Davis & Elkins Senators
- 1986–1987: Penn State Nittany Lions (assistant)
- 1988–2009: Penn State Nittany Lions

Barry Gorman is a collegiate soccer coach. He most recently served as the head men's soccer coach at Penn State University from 1987 to 2009, before being replaced by Bob Warming. He is Penn State's all-time winningest soccer coach, compiling 266 victories in 22 seasons. He is a three time NSCAA Regional Coach of the Year, having won the award in the 1992, 1999, and 2005 seasons. He also won Big Ten Coach of the Year honors in 2005. He has led his team to 13 NCAA tournament appearances, advancing to the round of 16 four times and to the national quarterfinals twice, and three Big 10 regular season championships. Prior to his time as head coach, Gorman also served as an assistant for two years under Walter Bahr.

== Modern conference play ==
In 2000, Gorman was appointed to the Board of the NSCAA in order to fill the vacancy left following the passing of Mike Berticelli. On Jan. 18, 2002, Gorman assumed the title of President of the NSCAA.

Gorman had a distinguished playing career in the Irish Football League located in Northern Ireland.

In 1976, Gorman emigrated to the United States to start his coaching career. In 1977, he was an assistant coach at Lock Haven University, leading the college to its first ever Division III national championship. In 1978, he was named head soccer coach at Elco High School in Pennsylvania, where he posted one of the most successful resumes in high school soccer history. His teams went 133-13-3, won five league championships, and captured the state championship in 1979.

In 1984, Gorman left to coach Davis & Elkins College to the 1984 Division II semifinals with a record of 13-3-3.

In April 2010, Gorman was named FC Dallas' technical director. As technical director, Gorman directed the club's player personnel operations, including international and domestic scouting, trades and acquisitions, player contracts and team administration. He also evaluated the development of FC Dallas Juniors prospects for the professional team. In December 2011 he was fired and later replaced as technical director by Fernando Clavijo.

His son, Trevor Gorman, is the head coach for the Albany Great Danes men's soccer team.

== PSU coaching legacy ==
100 Years, 4 Generations of Penn State Coaching History

Gorman is linked to Coach Bill Jeffrey, the head coach of Penn State University Men's Soccer in the early 20's, who later became the Men's national team head coach in the World Cup. Coach Jeffrey died in 1966 and his coaching lineage worked through four generations at Penn State University. By 1970, the captain of Jeffrey's 1950 USA team, Walter Bahr would become coach at Penn State from 1974 to 1988. His assistant, Barry Gorman, would later succeed him as head coach, keeping the Penn State job through the 2009 season. In 2021, the connection to Jeffrey continues with Coach Gorman's youth player, Fraser Kershaw, who took the head coaching job at Penn State Altoona. The coaching connection reached four separate generations of soccer, reaching a 100-year continual coaching succession.
