= 1926 Penn State Nittany Lions men's soccer team =

Penn State Nittany Lions men's soccer 1926 season

1926 Penn State Nittany Lions men's soccer

ISFA League, Co-National Champion
- Conference: Intercollegiate Soccer Football Association
- Record: 5–1–1 (5–0–0 ISFA)
- Head coach: William Jeffrey (1st season)
- Home stadium: New Beaver Field

The 1926 Penn State Nittany Lions men's soccer team represented Pennsylvania State University during the 1926 season playing in the Intercollegiate Soccer League. It was the program's 16th season fielding a men's varsity soccer team. The 1926 season is William Jeffrey's first year at the helm.

== Background ==
The 1926 season was the Nittany Lions' 16th season as a varsity soccer program, and their first season playing in the Intercollegiate Soccer Football Association League. The team was led by first year head coach, William Jeffrey, who had previously served as the head coach for the professional soccer team, Altoona Works.

William Jeffrey was hired after the departure of former head coach Ralph G. Leonard. The arrival of Jeffrey came on Monday, September 13, 1926.

At the beginning of the 1926 season the initial Intercollegiate Soccer League was dissolved. Penn State, who had long to be admitted to the league was extended an invitation to be a part of the next version of the former league called the Intercollegiate Soccer Football Association. The ISFA was created as a broader organization and governing body that would be support a for collegiate soccer play across the country. Receiving an invitation to join the association alongside Penn State were Lehigh, Army, Lafayette, Navy, Colgate, Dartmouth, Williams, Amherst, Wesley and all six former members of the Intercollegiate Soccer League. Under the new rules of the association Penn State would be required to play four members of the organization during each season. Instead of a league title, national championships would be awarded by the association at the end of each season.

In their first season in the new league the Nittany Lions were crowned Co-National Champions by the Intercollegiate Soccer Football Association along with Princeton and Haverford. The team was the only in the league to remain undefeated.

== Schedule ==
Date Time, TV	Rank^{#}	Opponent^{#}	Result	Record	Site (Attendance) City, State
Preseason
October 16*; 2:30 p.m.		Altoona Works	L 3–1	0–1–0 (0–0–0)	New Beaver Field; State College, PA
Regular season
October 23*; 10:00 a.m.		Syracuse	W 5–1	1–1–0 (1–0–0)	New Beaver Field; State College, PA
October 30		at Penn	W 1–0	2–1–0 (2–0–0)	River Field; Philadelphia, PA
November 6*; 2:30 p.m.		Toronto	T 2-2	2–1–1 (2–0–0)	New Beaver Field (500); State College, PA
November 13; 10:00 a.m.		Navy	W 5-1	3–1–1 (3–0–0)	New Beaver Field; State College, PA
November 20; 1:00 p.m.		Springfield College	W 2-0	4–1–1 (4–0–0)	New Beaver Field; State College, PA
November 29		Swarthmore	W 4-0	5–1–1 (5–0–0)	New Beaver Field; State College, PA
*Non-conference game. ^{#}Rankings from United Soccer Coaches. (#) Tournament seedings in parentheses.
