= Richard Packer =

Richard Packer may refer to:

- Richard Packer (civil servant), former British civil servant
- Richard Packer (politician) (1794–1872), New Zealand politician
- Dick Packer, American soccer player
