= Big Ten Conference Men's Soccer Coach of the Year =

- Awarded for: the best head coach in the Big Ten Conference
- Country: United States

History
- First award: 1991
- Most recent: Todd Yeagley, Indiana

The Big Ten Conference Men's Soccer Coach of the Year is an annual award given to the top men's college soccer coach in the Big Ten Conference. Indiana head coach Jerry Yeagley was named Coach of the Year a record eight times.

== Key ==
| | Awarded a National Coach of the Year award: United Soccer Coaches College Coach of the Year (USC) |
| † | Co-Coaches of the Year |
| * | Elected to the National Soccer Hall of Fame |
| Season^{‡} | Team won the NCAA Division I National Championship |

== Winners ==
| Season | Player | School | National Coach of the Year Awards | Reference |
|---|---|---|---|---|
| 1991 | Jim Launder | Wisconsin | — | |
| 1992 | Gary Avedikian | Ohio State | — | |
| 1993 | Jerry Yeagley* | Indiana | — | |
| 1994 | Jerry Yeagley* (2) | Indiana | USC | |
| 1995^{‡} | Jim Launder (2) | Wisconsin | USC | |
| 1996 | Joe Baum | Michigan State | — | |
| 1997 | Jerry Yeagley* (3) | Indiana | — | |
| 1998^{‡} | Jerry Yeagley* (4) | Indiana | USC | |
| 1999^{†} | John Bluem | Ohio State | — | |
| 1999^{‡†} | Jerry Yeagley* (5) | Indiana | USC | |
| 2000 | Joe Baum (2) | Michigan State | — | |
| 2001 | Jerry Yeagley* (6) | Indiana | — | |
| 2002 | Jerry Yeagley* (7) | Indiana | — | |
| 2003^{‡} | Jerry Yeagley* (8) | Indiana | USC | |
| 2004 | John Bluem (2) | Ohio State | — | |
| 2005 | Barry Gorman | Penn State | — | |
| 2006 | Mike Freitag | Indiana | — | |
| 2007 | Mike Freitag (2) | Indiana | — | |
| 2008 | Joe Baum | Michigan State | — | |
| 2009 | John Bluem (3) | Ohio State | — | |
| 2010 | Todd Yeagley | Indiana | — | |
| 2011 | Tim Lenahan | Northwestern | — | |
| 2012 | Bob Warming | Penn State | — | |
| 2013 | Bob Warming (2) | Penn State | — | |
| 2014 | John Bluem (4) | Ohio State | — | |
| 2015 | Dan Donigan | Rutgers | — | |
| 2016 | Sasho Cirovski | Maryland | — | |
| 2017 | Chaka Daley | Michigan | — | |
| 2018 | Todd Yeagley (2) | Indiana | — | |
| 2019 | Todd Yeagley (3) | Indiana | — | |
| 2020 | Todd Yeagley (4) | Indiana | — | |
| 2021 | Jeff Cook | Penn State | — | |
| 2022 | Sasho Cirovski (2) | Maryland | — | |
| 2023 | Jeff Cook (2) | Penn State | — | |
| 2024 | Brian Maisonneuve | Ohio State | USC | |
| 2025 | Sasho Cirovski (3) | Maryland | — | |
| 2026 | Todd Yeagley (5) | Indiana | — | |

== Winners by school ==
| School (year joined) | Winners | Years |
|---|---|---|
| Indiana (1991) | 15 | 1993, 1994, 1997, 1998, 1999, 2001, 2002, 2003, 2006, 2007, 2010, 2018, 2019, 2020, 2026 |
| Ohio State (1991) | 6 | 1992, 1999, 2004, 2009, 2014, 2024 |
| Penn State (1991) | 5 | 2005, 2012, 2013, 2021, 2023 |
| Michigan State (1991) | 3 | 1996, 2000, 2008 |
| Maryland (2014) | 3 | 2016, 2022, 2025 |
| Wisconsin (1991) | 2 | 1991, 1995 |
| Michigan (2000) | 1 | 2017 |
| Northwestern (1991) | 1 | 2011 |
| Rutgers (2014) | 1 | 2015 |
