= Casey Bahr =

American soccer player

Personal information
- Full name: Walter Elliot Bahr
- Date of birth: September 20, 1948 (age 78)
- Place of birth: Mount Holly, New Jersey, U.S.
- Height: 5 ft 8 1/2 in (1.74 m)
- Position: Defender

College career
Years	Team	Apps	(Gls)
1966–1969	Navy Midshipmen		

Senior career*
Years	Team	Apps	(Gls)
1972	Philadelphia Spartans (indoor)		
1972	Philadelphia Ukrainians		
1973	Philadelphia Atoms		
1975	Washington Diplomats		
1975–1976	Philadelphia Ukrainians		
1977	Philadelphia United German-Hungarians		
1977–1979	Philadelphia Ukrainians		
1978–1979	Philadelphia Fever (indoor)		

International career
1971–1972	United States Olympic		
- * Club domestic league appearances and goals

Walter Elliot "Casey" Bahr (born September 20, 1948) is an American soccer player who played as a defender. He played college soccer for the Navy Midshipmen; while serving in the Navy, he was a member of the soccer team at the 1972 Summer Olympics. Bahr played for a number of clubs based in Philadelphia, and played one season in the North American Soccer League (NASL) and one in the Major Indoor Soccer League (MISL).

== College career ==
Bahr attended the United States Naval Academy, playing soccer for the Midshipmen. He was a 1968 and 1969 honorable mention (third team) All America. He graduated from Annapolis in 1970 and served three years in the United States Navy.

== Club career ==
In 1972, Bahr made appearances for the indoor team of the Philadelphia Spartans and in the German American Football Association (GAFA) for the Philadelphia Ukrainians. In 1973, Al Miller, head coach of the expansion Philadelphia Atoms of the North American Soccer League (NASL) signed Bahr. According to some sources, Bahr played only three games; others say seventeen. In 1975, Bahr had a brief stint with the Washington Diplomats, but rejoined the Philadelphia Ukrainians soon afterwards. In 1977, he played for the Philadelphia United German-Hungarians, where they reached the finals of the National Cup and the amateur cup, but lost both of them. He was teammates with his younger brother Chris during the 1977 season. He finished out his career with the Ukrainians, retiring in 1979. In 1978, he also signed with the expansion Philadelphia Fever of the Major Indoor Soccer League (MISL). He played nine games with the Fever.

== International career ==
Bahr was part of the U.S. Olympic team that defeated Jamaica to make it to the Olympics for the first time since the 1956 games. Bahr played three games for the 1972 U.S. Olympic soccer team in Munich.

== Personal life ==
Bahr is the son of National Soccer Hall of Fame member Walter Bahr. His younger brothers Matt and Chris also played in the North American Soccer League (NASL), before switching codes to play as placekickers in the National Football League (NFL). At the time of his call-up to the Olympic team, he had been residing in Toms River, New Jersey, where he served with the Navy's Helicopter Antisubmarine Squadron.

After his soccer career had ended, he became a civil servant, primarily with the Department of Defense. Outside of this, he would coach soccer at the youth and high school level.
