= Jim Stamatis =

American soccer player (born 1958)

Personal information
- Date of birth: February 28, 1958 (age 68)
- Place of birth: Kiriaki, Greece
- Position: Midfielder

College career
Years	Team	Apps	(Gls)
1975–1979	Penn State Nittany Lions		

Senior career*
Years	Team	Apps	(Gls)
1980	San Diego Sockers	9	(0)
1981–1982	Denver Avalanche (indoor)	22	(12)
1981–1982	Pennsylvania Stoners		
- * Club domestic league appearances and goals

Jim Stamatis (born February 28, 1958) is an American former soccer midfielder and the chief executive officer of The Louis Berger Group. He played professionally in the North American Soccer League, Major Indoor Soccer League and American Soccer League.

== Youth and college ==
Stamatis moved to the United States with his family as a youth. He attended Liberty High School in Lehigh Valley, Pennsylvania. and was selected to the All State Team in 1975. After high school, he was recruited by many top colleges but elected to play at Penn State because of Coach Bahr's honesty that Stamatis would need to earn a place on the team. Stamatis did work hard and developed into one of the top collegiate forwards.

In 1978, Stamatis was named as a first team All American. The following year, Stamatis was selected as the 1979 winner of the Hermann Trophy, awarded annually to the most outstanding player in all of American college soccer. Penn State also made it to the NCAA championship semifinals that year before losing to eventual winners SIU-E.

== National team ==
His outstanding play with Penn State brought him to the attention of the national team and he was called up to the U-23 national team at the 1979 Pan American Games and for preparations for the 1980 Summer Olympics.

== Professional soccer ==
In 1980, the San Diego Sockers selected Stamatis in the first round of the North American Soccer League draft. He only played a year in the league before moving to the Denver Avalanche of Major Indoor Soccer League and the Pennsylvania Stoners of the American Soccer League before back injuries cut short his playing career.

== Post-soccer career ==
He had failed to complete his degree while at Penn State, so he decided to enter the New Jersey Institute of Technology where he graduated with a Civil Engineering degree in 1985. His choice of school was influenced by the fact that his fiancée, now wife, was from New Jersey. While in New Jersey, Stamatis continued his association with soccer, now as a coach rather than as a player. He became an assistant coach with the school's men's soccer team. Stamatis became a civil engineer for the Louis Berger Group and rose to the position of President and chief executive officer. While he did not continue to coach soccer after graduating from NJIT, he got back into coaching when his children began playing. His achievements as a coach now include three New Jersey State Cups and two Region I Championships. He has two sons; John, who played at Harvard University from 2005 to 2008, and William, who currently plays for Columbia University.
