= Dick Packer =

American soccer player (1934–2024)

Personal information
- Full name: Richard Packer
- Date of birth: August 22, 1934
- Place of birth: Newtown, Pennsylvania, U.S.
- Date of death: November 15, 2024 (aged 90)
- Height: 5 ft 10 in (1.78 m)
- Position: Center forward

Youth career
- 1953–1955: Penn State

Senior career*
Years	Team	Apps	(Gls)
1955–1956	Uhrik Truckers		
1959–1968	Uhrik Truckers		

International career
1956	United States	Called up	
- * Club domestic league appearances and goals

Richard Packer (August 22, 1934 – November 15, 2024) was an American soccer center forward who was a member of the U.S. team at the 1956 Summer Olympics. He was a two time First Team All American at Penn State and played over ten seasons in the American Soccer League.

== Biography ==
Packer grew up in Newtown, Bucks County, Pennsylvania. He attended the George School where he played soccer, basketball and baseball. In 1952, the Penn State University soccer coach, Bill Jeffrey, recruited Packer. He entered Penn State on a full athletic scholarship, playing both baseball, as a center fielder and shortstop, as well as center forward on the soccer team. At the time, collegiate rules prohibited freshmen from playing intercollegiate sports. Consequently, he played on the varsity soccer team from 1953 to 1955. His junior season, he dropped baseball and concentrated on soccer for his last two seasons at Penn State. In 1954, Penn State won the national college championship and shared the 1955 title with Brockport University. Packer was named to the 1954 and 1955 first team All American team. Despite playing only three seasons and twenty-four games, he scored 53 goals, a school record which stood until broken by Stuart Reid in 1995.

In December 1955, he joined the Uhrik Truckers of the American Soccer League. By that time, he had been selected for the U.S. Olympic Soccer team as it prepared for the 1956 Summer Olympics. In order to maintain his amateur, he played without pay with Truckers. The Truckers won the 1955-1956 ASL championship with Packer coming off the bench and scoring two goals in the title game. Packer graduated from Penn State in 1956 with a bachelor's degree in hotel administration. That summer, he went to the Summer Olympics, but did not play in the team's only game, a 9–1 loss to Yugoslavia.

During his college years, he had attended ROTC and after graduation, he was commissioned as a second lieutenant in the Air Force. Packer separated from the Air Force in 1959. He rejoined Uhrik and would play with the team until at least 1968. Packer also worked in the travel industry. He also ran soccer camps for over thirty years.

Packer died on November 15, 2024, at the age of 90.

== See also ==
- List of Pennsylvania State University Olympians
