= Jeff Cook (soccer coach) =

American soccer coach

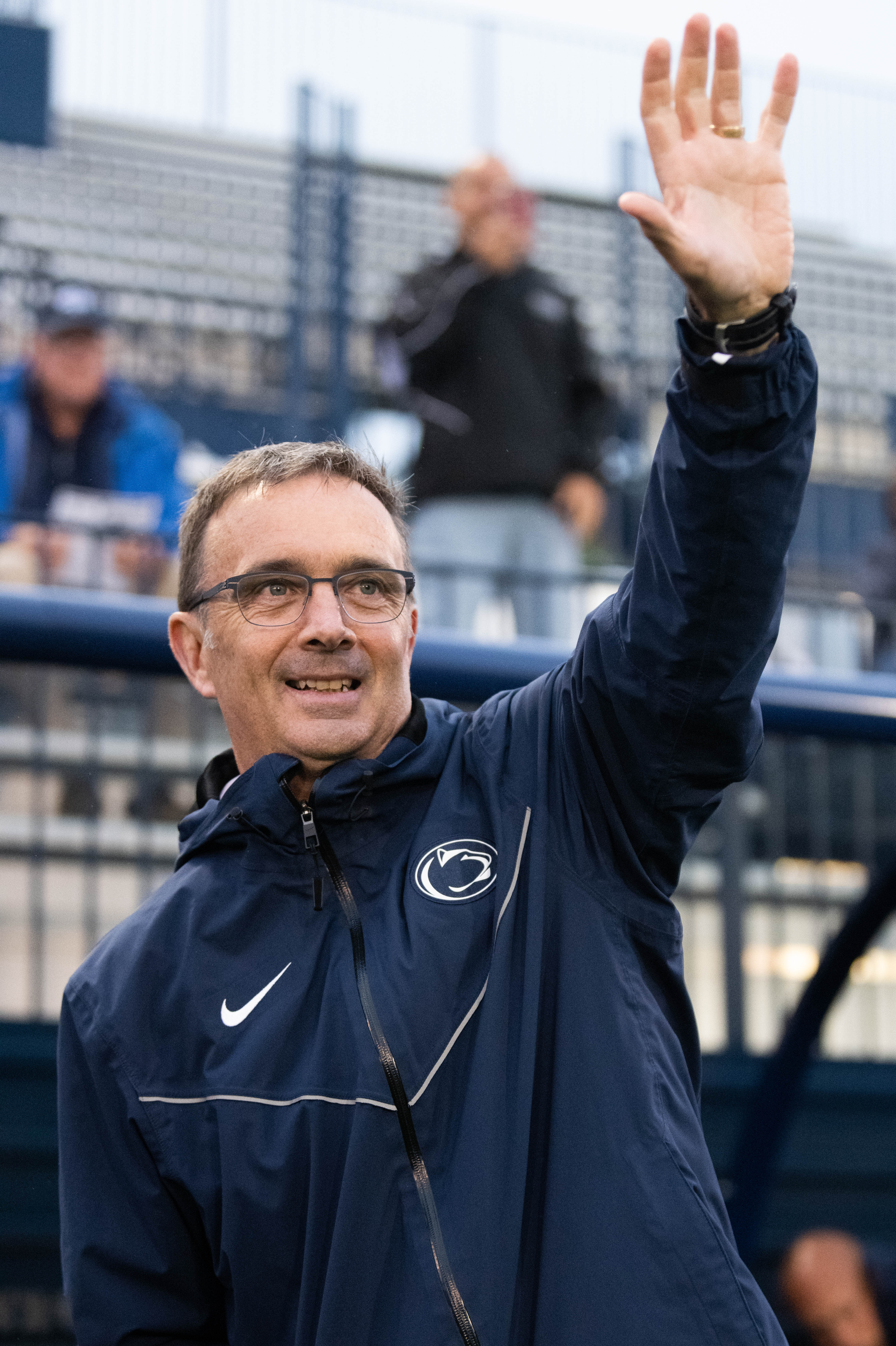

Personal information
- Place of birth: Springfield, Massachusetts, United States
- Position: Midfielder

College career
Years	Team	Apps	(Gls)
1986–1989	Bates Bobcats		

Managerial career
- 1989–1991: UMass Minutemen (assistant)
- 1991–1993: Wheaton Lyons
- 1994–1996: Dartmouth Big Green (assistant)
- 1996–2000: Cincinnati Bearcats
- 2001–2012: Dartmouth Big Green
- 2013–2017: Philadelphia Union Academy
- 2016–2017: Bethlehem Steel (assistant)
- 2018–2025: Penn State Nittany Lions

Jeff Cook is an American soccer coach. He was most recently the head men's soccer coach at Pennsylvania State University. Cook resigned from Penn State in November 2025 to take a position within Major League Soccer.

== Coaching career ==
Cook started his coaching career as an assistant at the University of Massachusetts Amherst. In 1991, he earned his first head coaching gig, becoming the head coach at Division III school, Wheaton College. While at Wheaton, he compiled a 31–22–4 record for three seasons.

In May 1994, he took an assistant coaching job at Dartmouth College, under head coach Fran O'Leary. He held that position until February 1996, when he became head coach at the University of Cincinnati. From 1996 to 2000, he led the Bearcats to a 44–42–8 record. He earned Conference USA Coach of the Year honors in 1997, after leading the Bearcats to a 7–8–3 record. In 1998, he led the Bearcats to the school's first ever NCAA Tournament appearance, going 12–5–3. In 1999, he led the Bearcats to its highest ever national ranking at 15th.

In 2001, he was named head men's soccer coach at Dartmouth College, compiling a 106–74–31 record with the Big Green. He led Dartmouth to five Ivy League championships, and to the NCAA tournament seven times, including two Sweet Sixteen berths. He resigned in April 2013, to take a position in the youth academy system of the Philadelphia Union.

In April 2013 he was named the head coach for the Philadelphia Union's U-16 Academy team. The Union are joining the U.S. Soccer Development Academy starting in the 2013–14 season.

On January 2, 2018, Cook was named the 12th coach of the Penn State Nittany Lions' men's soccer program. He led the team to a 6–9–2 record, but posted a six-win improvement in 2019, his second season at the helm, going 12–4–3 and leading Penn State to its first NCAA Tournament berth since 2014.

Cook was named the Big Ten Conference Soccer Coach of the Year after his successful 2021 season with Penn State seeing the team win the regular season championship for the first time in his tenure.
