= Chris Bahr =

American football and soccer player (born 1953)

Personal information
- Born: Christopher Kurt Bahr; February 3, 1953 (age 73) State College, Pennsylvania, U.S.
- Height: 5 ft 10 in (178 cm)
- Weight: 170 lb (77 kg; 12 st 2 lb)
Association football career
- Position: Midfielder
College career
Years	Team	Apps	(Gls)
1972–1974	Penn State Nittany Lions		
Senior career*
Years	Team	Apps	(Gls)
1975	Philadelphia Atoms	22	(11)
1977	Philadelphia Ukrainians	0	(0)
Total		22	(11)
International career
1975	United States Olympic	1	(2)
- * Club domestic league appearances and goals

Sport
- Football career

No. 10, 3
- Position: Placekicker

Career information
- High school: Neshaminy (Langhorne, Pennsylvania)
- College: Penn State
- NFL draft: 1976: 2nd round, 51st overall pick

Career history
- Cincinnati Bengals (1976–1979); Oakland / Los Angeles Raiders (1980–1988); San Diego Chargers (1989)

Awards and highlights
- 2× Super Bowl champion (XV, XVIII); PFWA All-Rookie Team (1976); First-team All-American (1975); First-team All-East (1975)

Career NFL statistics
- Field goals: 241/381
- Field goal %: 63.3
- Longest field goal: 55
- Extra points: 490/519
- Stats at Pro Football Reference

Christopher Kurt Bahr (born February 3, 1953) is an American former professional football and soccer player. He was a placekicker in the National Football League (NFL) and played as a midfielder in the North American Soccer League (NASL).

== College and soccer career ==
Bahr attended Penn State University, where he was named an All-American three times for soccer and once for football. He led the Nittany Lions in scoring in 1975, including four field goals over 50 yards. He averaged 39 yards in punts. Bahr graduated in 1975 with a Bachelor of Science in Biology and later earned a Juris Doctor at Southwestern University School of Law, attending school part-time while still playing with the Raiders.

Bahr was the first round draft pick of the Philadelphia Atoms in the 1975 North American Soccer League draft. As a rookie midfielder, he made an immediate impression, tying an NASL scoring record for goals by a locally-born American by netting 11, including two 2-goal games and four game winners. Bahr also netted the first sudden death goal in Atoms history against the New York Cosmos in front of 20,124 at Veterans Stadium. He was named the 1975 NASL Rookie of the Year. Bahr played 22 games for the Atoms, scoring 11 goals before departing for the NFL. In 1977, he returned to play for the Philadelphia Ukrainians of the German American Football Association (GAFA), where he was teammates with his older brother Casey.

On April 27, 1975, he scored both goals for the United States in their 2–0 shutout of Bermuda in the qualifying rounds for the 1976 Summer Olympics in Montreal, Quebec, Canada.

== Professional football career ==
Bahr switched football codes in 1976, and was drafted by the Cincinnati Bengals, becoming their placekicker. He played four seasons for the Bengals before being acquired by the Oakland Raiders in 1980; he played for them for most of the 1980s, following them to Los Angeles in 1982, becoming a stalwart placekicker with them that saw him win two Super Bowl championships. He is the Raiders' second all-time leader in scoring (817 points), and his 162 career field goals was a Raiders record until 2007 when it was surpassed by Sebastian Janikowski. Bahr kicked in two Raiders Super Bowl victories, (1981 and 1984). Perhaps his best year as a professional came in 1983, when he compiled a 78% field goal percentage. He finished his career with a strong season, kicking 17 field goals and 29 PATs for the San Diego Chargers in 1989.

He was named to the All-Rookie team in 1976 and a Sporting News All-AFC in 1977.

== Career regular season statistics ==
Career high/best bolded

Regular season statistics
Season	Team (record)	G	FGM	FGA	%	<20	20-29	30-39	40-49	50+	LNG	BLK	XPM	XPA	%	PTS
1976	CIN (10–4)	14	14	27	51.9	1–1	6–8	2–4	3–8	2–6	51	0	39	42	92.9	81
1977	CIN (8–6)	14	19	27	70.4	1–1	**10–11**	4–8	4–6	0–1	47	0	25	26	96.2	82
1978	CIN (4–12)	**16**	16	30	53.3	0–0	5–7	4–8	6–12	1–3	52	0	26	29	89.7	74
1979	CIN (4–12)	**16**	13	23	56.5	0–0	4–6	3–7	4–8	2–2	**55**	0	40	42	95.2	79
1980	OAK (11–5)	**16**	19	**37**	51.4	0–0	4–6	9–12	6–13	0–6	48	0	41	44	93.2	98
1981	OAK (7–9)	**16**	14	24	58.3	0–0	6–8	2–4	3–7	**3–5**	51	0	27	33	81.8	69
1982	LA (8–1)	9	10	16	62.5	1–1	2–3	4–5	3–5	0–2	43	0	32	33	97.0	62
1983	LA (12–4)	**16**	**21**	27	**77.8**	0–0	9–11	8–9	4–6	0–1	47	0	**51**	**53**	96.2	**114**
1984	LA (11–5)	**16**	20	27	74.1	1–1	7–7	4–7	**7–11**	1–1	50	0	40	42	95.2	100
1985	LA (12–4)	**16**	20	32	62.5	0–0	9–9	7–10	3–12	1–1	51	0	40	42	95.2	100
1986	LA (8–8)	**16**	**21**	28	75.0	**3–3**	6–6	6–9	5–8	1–2	52	0	36	36	**100.0**	99
1987	LA (5–10)	13	19	29	65.5	0–0	6–6	**10–13**	3–10	0–0	48	0	27	28	96.4	84
1988	LA (7–9)	**16**	18	29	62.1	1–1	7–7	3–6	6–11	1–4	50	0	37	39	94.9	91
1989	SD (6–10)	**16**	17	25	68.0	0–0	6–6	6–9	4–6	1–4	53	0	29	30	96.7	80
Career (14 seasons)		210	241	381	63.3	8–8	87–101	72–111	61–123	13–38	55	0	490	519	94.8	1213

== Personal life ==
Bahr is the son of Walter Bahr, a member of the National Soccer Hall of Fame. His mother, Davies Ann (née Uhler), was a champion swimmer at Temple University and a physical education teacher at Penn State University. His brother Casey Bahr was an All American soccer player for the Navy Midshipmen, played professionally and was a member of the 1972 U.S. Olympic soccer team. His younger brother, Matt Bahr played professional soccer and was also a standout placekicker in the NFL; he and Matt are two of six players to have played in both professional soccer and the NFL. Sister Davies Ann Desiderio was an All-American gymnast at Penn State.

Bahr holds an annual Chris Bahr Kicking Camp, a 3-day clinic for student in grades 7–12 at Franklin & Marshall College in Lancaster, Pennsylvania.

After his NFL career, Bahr graduated from Southwestern Law School and practiced law in California and Pennsylvania until 1999 when his license was suspended for failing to pay bar fees. He is currently a financial consultant, managing assets for professional athletes for ProVest Management Group in Columbus, Ohio. He lives in Boalsburg, Pennsylvania with his wife Eve, a corporate attorney. Bahr's son, C.J., was the placekicker for the Slippery Rock. His other son, Dieter, was a midfielder for the Delaware Fightin' Blue Hens.
