= 1951 Soccer Bowl =

Penn State	Purdue
Independent	Independent
3	1
- Date: January 1, 1951
- Venue: Sportsman's Park, St. Louis, Missouri
- Referee: Paul Garcia
- Attendance: 1,673
- Weather: Fair and 47 °F (8 °C)

The 1951 Soccer Bowl was the second edition of the Soccer Bowl, the post-season college soccer championship game between the Penn State Nittany Lions and the Purdue held on January 1, 1951, at the Sportsman's Park in St. Louis, Missouri. The match ended in a 3–1 victory with Penn State claiming their second Soccer Bowl, and their 11th claimed national men's soccer championship. The game was used to determine the champion of the 1950 ISFA season, which predated the NCAA as the premier organizing body of collegiate soccer, and represented the concluding game of the season for both teams.

The match originally was going to feature Penn State playing the San Francisco Dons soccer team in the final, but the Dons were unable to make the trip to St. Louis, causing Purdue to serve as an alternate.

== Background ==
Historically, Penn State had been heralded as one of the top college soccer programs in the United States from the late 1920s into the late 1940s. From 1926 until 1950 head coach Bill Jeffrey had the Penn State program accumulate a record of 138–20–24.

Unlike Penn State, Purdue's men's soccer team was not a varsity team sponsored by the university, but a club team sponsored by the Purdue University students. Since at the time the NCAA did not sanction the sport, the ISFA permitted varsity and club teams to compete against each other.

== The match ==
The match was kicked off at 2:45 p.m. Central Time as part of a triple-header of soccer matches held at Sportsman's Park. The opening matches featured local high school soccer programs in the St. Louis metro area. At noon St. Joseph's Home took on St. Edwards for the C.Y.C. Parochial title. At 1:15 p.m., Kendrick Prep Seminary School took on DeAndreis for the championship game of the Christmas Week High School Tournament.

The weather for the match was fair with temperatures around 47 °F (8 °C) at the time of kick off, dropping to 44 °F (7 °C) by the conclusion of the match. The humidity was around 82% and winds came from the South at 16 miles per hour.

The match was played in two, 45-minute halves according to standard U.S.S.F.A rules. Pete Garcia was the center referee, while Justin Keenoy was an assist referee.

=== Details ===
January 1, 1951
2:45 PM CST

Penn State	3–1	Purdue
Lane 39'; Kocher 60' (pen.); Buss 87'	Report	Siero 46'

Sportsman's Park, St. Louis
Attendance: 1,673
Referee: Paul Garcia

Penn State	Purdue

GK	1	(United States) Ron Coder
FB	18	(England) Bill Yerkes
FB		(United States) Jay Simmons
HB		(England) George Emig
HB		(United States) Kurt Klaus
HB		(Scotland) Frank Follmer
OL		(United States) Ray Buss
IL		(United States) Ron Coleman
C		(United States) Joseph Lane
IR		(Scotland) Harry Little
OR		(United States) Ed Smith
Substitutes:
FB		(United States) Jack Kurty
IR		(United States) Charlton
IR		(Venezuela) Gus Biggott
OL		(United States) Ellis Kocher
Manager:
(Scotland) Bill Jeffrey

GK	(Italy) Alessandro Bazo
FB	(United States) Gary Quastler
FB	(Norway) Njord Harsem
HB	(Finland) Ragnar Haabjoern
HB	(United States) Darnell McGhee
HB	(United States) Dan Caldera
IR	(Norway) Arnt Just Garpestad
OR	(Iran) Jahangir Hanjani
IL	(Italy) Louis Siero
OL	(United States) Samuel Smith
C	(Turkey) Barry Toulonkian
Substitutes:
FB	G.O. Amundsen
HB	Hyneman
OL	Reggio
C	Brown
Manager:
Unknown

Assistant referee:
Justin Keenoy (United States)

Match rules:

- USSFA rules
- Two 45-minute halves

== Legacy ==
The Soccer Bowl championship gave Penn State their second ever Soccer Bowl, and their 11th claimed National championship. Despite the title, the ISFA claimed West Chester the national champions concluding the season given their undefeated 8–0–0 record, in which one of their victories was against Penn State, which drew ire from Penn State and South Florida's programs. Despite this recognition by the ISFA, it is not recognized as a national title by the NCAA, although both South Florida, Penn State, and West Chester declare themselves national champions, which is a claim recognized by the American Soccer History Archives.
