= 1883–84 Iowa Hawkeyes men's soccer team =

American college soccer season

1883–84 Iowa Hawkeyes men's soccer

National champions (ASHA/IFRA)
- Conference: Independent
- Record: 2–0–0
- Head coach: Unknown

1883–84 college soccer records
	Conf.			Overall
Team	W	L	T	W		L		T
Iowa ‡		–		2	–	0	–	0
Richmond		–		1	–	0	–	0
VMI		–		0	–	0	–	1
Washington & Lee		–		0	–	0	–	1
Minnesota		–		1	–	1	–	0
Hamline		–		1	–	1	–	0
Randolph-Macon		–		0	–	1	–	0
Cornell (IA)		–		0	–	2	–	0
‡-National champion

The 1883–84 Iowa Hawkeyes men's soccer team represented the State University of Iowa during the 1883–84 college soccer season. Per the Intercollegiate Football Research Association and the American Soccer History Archives, the 1883–84 squad was declared the de facto national champion during this season, although it was nearly 20 years prior to the first formal awarding of a collegiate soccer champion. The team played two matches against Cornell College and won both 1–0, giving them a perfect 2–0–0 record, leaving them with the best overall record among college soccer programs that season.

According to a research study by Melvin Smith in his book Evolvements of Early American Foot Ball: Through the 1890/91 Season, it was Iowa's third season fielding a team.

== Schedule ==
Date Time, TV	Rank^{#}	Opponent^{#}	Result	Record	Site City, State
Matches
1883*		at Cornell College	W 1–0	1–0–0	Mount Vernon, IA
1884*		Cornell College	W 1–0	2–0–0	Iowa City, IA
