= 1952 Soccer Bowl =

San Francisco	Temple
Independent	Independent
0	2
- Date: February 3, 1952
- Venue: Kezar Stadium, San Francisco, California
- Attendance: 10,000
- Weather: Fair and 59 °F (15 °C)

The 1952 Soccer Bowl was the third and final edition of the Soccer Bowl, a soccer match to determine the college soccer champion prior to the arrival of the NCAA Division I Men's Soccer Tournament. The match featured the University of San Francisco Dons men's soccer program against Temple University Owls men's soccer program. After being played in St. Louis, Missouri for two years, the third Soccer Bowl was hosted by the University of San Francisco at Kezar Stadium.

Temple won the match 2–0 to claim their third national championship. Although Temple won the Soccer Bowl, the ISFA declared the Franklin & Marshall Diplomats as the national champions of the 1951 ISFA season. The American Soccer History Archives recognizes both titles as valid national championship claims.
