= 1950 Soccer Bowl =

Penn State	San Francisco
Independent	NCISC
2	2
- Date: January 1, 1950
- Venue: Sportsman's Park, St. Louis, Missouri
- Referee: Harry Lyons
- Attendance: 4,500
- Weather: Party Cloudy and 56 °F (13 °C)

The 1950 Soccer Bowl was the first edition of the Soccer Bowl, a post-season college soccer championship game between the Penn State Nittany Lions and the San Francisco Dons held on January 1, 1950, at the Sportsman's Park in St. Louis, Missouri. The match ended in a 2–2 draw with Penn State and San Francisco sharing the title. The game was used to determine the champion of the 1949 ISFA season, which predated the NCAA as the premier organizing body of collegiate soccer, and represented the concluding game of the season for both teams.

== Background ==
Soccer had been played at the American collegiate level since at least the late 1860s, with variations of a kicking game being played since the mid-1840s. Organized collegiate soccer did not formally occur in the United States until the arrival of the Intercollegiate Soccer Football League, which began in 1904. The ISFL determined national championships for college programs from 1905 until 1925, and from 1926 until 1940 the Intercollegiate Soccer Football Association of America determined national champions. These championship titles were determined by a selection committee and were largely subjective. These championships are not formally recognized by the NCAA as legitimate national championship claims.

Throughout World War II and into the late 1940s, the ISFAA did not claim any national championships, although several college programs with undefeated records, or teams atop the NSCAA poll claimed national championships during this time, causing numerous programs to stake championship claims in the same year. After World War II, the ISFA began declaring national championships, which drew ire from programs that felt they deserved a national championship title, but were not considered by the ISFA committee.

The goal of the Soccer Bowl was to take the highest ranked NSCAA and ISFA teams to have them play a one off match at a neutral venue. The concept of a neutral venue and titling the match as a "bowl" was heavy inspired and barrowed from the bowl game system that college American football uses.

== Route to the bowl ==
=== San Francisco ===
San Francisco ended the regular season with a perfect 10–0–0 record with a 6–0–0 record in the Northern California Intercollegiate Soccer Conference (NCISC). In the championship game for the NCISC title, San Francisco defeated UCLA, 3–1, to win the title. Ahead of the Soccer Bowl, the Dons played an exhibition match against a semi-professional team known as the Los Angeles Aztecs (unrelated to the NASL Aztecs), and tied 2–2.

The San Francisco soccer teams of the mid 20th century were known for recruiting international talent, partially due to the city's cosmopolitan and international recognition. While the team was traveling from San Francisco to St. Louis, the team was going out to dinner at a local restaurant in the area. The waiter refused to serve San Francisco's Olifumni Osibogu, a black Nigerian player on the team. Head coach, Gus Donoghue, rounded up the team and the left the restaurant and went to a hotel and restaurant in East St. Louis, Illinois, where integration was allowed.

== The Match ==
In the 1940s through 1950s, college soccer in the United States was played in four 22-minute quarters, partially in an effort to Americanize the sport to prevent alienating spectators. The match drew a crowd of 4,500 spectators at Sportsman's Park. The match was played in partly cloudy conditions, with unseasonably warm weather for winter. The high temperature that day was 61 °F (16 °C) and at kick off the temperature was around 56 °F (13 °C).

The first goal of the match was scored by San Francisco's Dick Baptista. Penn State's Harry Little scored the tying goal off of a deflected shot. Baptista would score the go-ahead goal later in the match to give San Francisco the 2–1 lead. The match remained that scoreline until late into the fourth quarter. The center official allowed for six minutes of stoppage time, and with 10 seconds left in the match, the center referee, Harry Lyons, awarded a penalty kick to Penn State. Several San Francisco players protested saying that there was no handball to prompt the penalty kick. Penn State's Little would score the tying penalty kick ending the match in a 2–2 draw.

It has been disputed as to whether or not the match was agreed to end in a draw, or if San Francisco refused to play overtime against Penn State. Nevertheless, the 1st Soccer Bowl was declared to be a share title between Penn State and San Francisco, a national title both programs, the ISFA, as well as the American Soccer History Archives, recognize.

=== Details ===
January 1, 1950
2:00 PM CST

Penn State	2–2	San Francisco
Little 51', 88+7'	Report	Baptista 33', 66'

Sportsman's Park, St. Louis
Attendance: 4,500
Referee: Harry Lyons

Penn State	San Francisco

GK	(Scotland) George Lawther
FB	(England) William Yerkes
FB	(England) Chuck Margolf
HB	(United States) Dick Hannah
HB	(United States) Ralph Hosterman
HB	(United States) Will Kraybill
OL	(United States) Ray Buss
IL	(United States) Ron Coleman
C	(United States) Joseph Lane
IR	(Scotland) Harry Little
OR	(United States) Ted Lieb
Substitutes:
OR	(United States) Harry Lawroski
Manager:
(Scotland) Bill Jeffrey

GK	(Italy) Angelo Carmassi
FB	(Romania) Stephen Negoesco
FB	(Mexico) Carlos Diaz
HB	(Nigeria) Olifumni Osibogu
HB	(England) Robert Lee
HB	(El Salvador) Charles Heredia
OL	(United States) Joe Matute
IL	(Scotland) Henry Kirner
C	(United States) Dick Baptista
IR	(Philippines) Mario Ugarte
OR	(Philippines) Luis Ugarte
Substitutes:
HB	(United States) Mark Steinberg
OL	(Italy) Tony Ragusla
Manager:
(Scotland) Gus Donoghue

Assistant referee:
Justin Keeney (United States)

Match rules:

- 88 minutes.
- Four 22-minute quarters
- Unlimited substitutes

== See also ==
- Soccer in St. Louis
