= Penn State Nittany Lions men's soccer =

Men's soccer team of Penn State University

- Founded: 1911; 115 years ago
- University: Pennsylvania State University
- Head coach: Jeff Cook (6th season)
- Conference: Big Ten
- Location: State College, Pennsylvania, US
- Stadium: Jeffrey Field (capacity: 5,000)
- Nickname: Nittany Lions
- Colors: Navy and white
Home	Away

Pre-tournament ISFA/ISFL championships
- ISFA: 1926*, 1929, 1933*, 1949*, 1954, 1955*; Claimed: 1936, 1937, 1938, 1939, 1940; Soccer Bowl: 1949 (tie), 1950 (* shared)

NCAA tournament College Cup
- 1979

NCAA tournament Quarterfinals
- 1971, 1972, 1973, 1979, 1980, 1985, 1986, 1999, 2002

NCAA tournament Round of 16
- 1970, 1971, 1972, 1973, 1977, 1979, 1981, 1982, 1984, 1985, 1986, 1992, 1993, 1994, 1998, 1999, 2001, 2002, 2005, 2010, 2013, 2020

NCAA tournament appearances
- 1970, 1971, 1972, 1973, 1974, 1975, 1976, 1977, 1978, 1979, 1980, 1981, 1982, 1984, 1985, 1986, 1988, 1989, 1992, 1993, 1994, 1995, 1998, 1999, 2001, 2002, 2004, 2005, 2009, 2010, 2013, 2014, 2019, 2020, 2021

Conference tournament championships
- 1987, 1988, 1989, 1993, 2002, 2005, 2021

Conference regular season championships
- 1987, 1988, 1989, 1995, 2005, 2012, 2013, 2021, 2023

The Penn State Nittany Lions men's soccer team is an intercollegiate varsity sports team of Pennsylvania State University. The team is a member of the Big Ten Conference of the National Collegiate Athletic Association.

Penn State's intercollegiate soccer program began in 1911 and has won or shared 11 national championships and 6 conference tournament championships. In 1959, the team joined the National Collegiate Athletic Association when it added men's soccer to its program and in 1987 joined the Atlantic 10 Conference as a charter member. Penn State is currently a member of the Big Ten Conference and a participating school in its men's soccer league. The men's soccer team joined the Big Ten in the conference's first year of collegiate soccer play, 1991. The league is composed of teams from Penn State, Indiana, Iowa, Maryland, Michigan, Michigan State, Northwestern, Ohio State, Rutgers and Wisconsin.

Penn State has won three Big Ten Men's Soccer Tournament championships, made it to 12 tournament finals, and finished first in the conference table winning the regular season four times.

== History ==
=== Team Formation ===
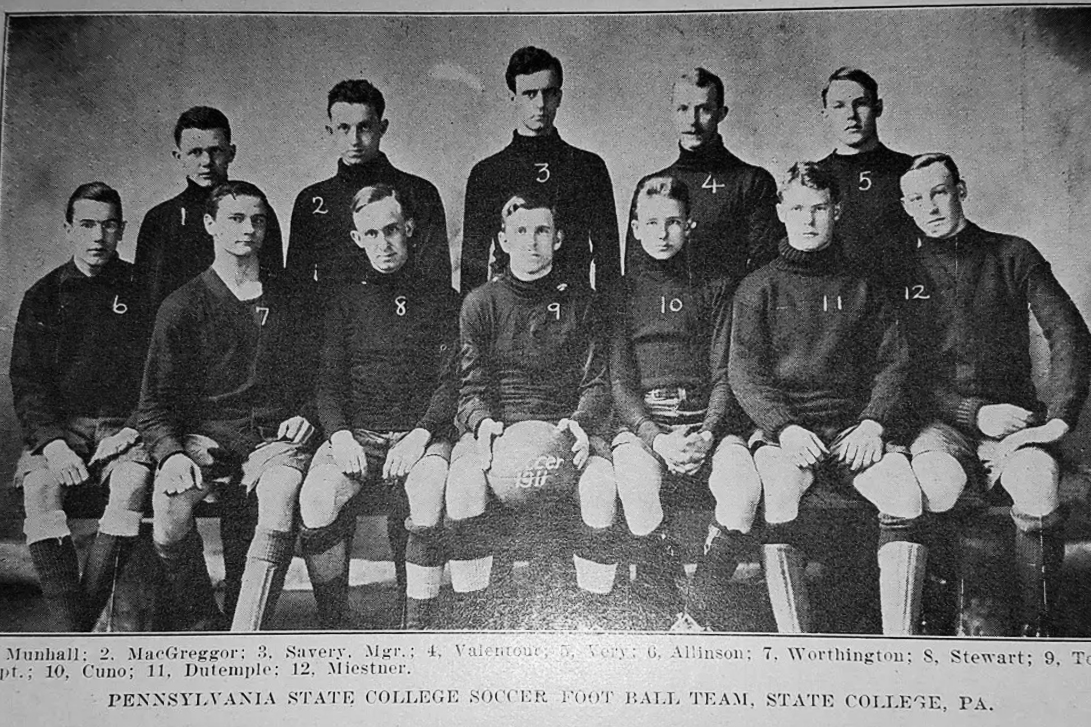
Penn State Men's soccer team, 1911

The formation of a men's soccer program at Pennsylvania State University began with the first soccer match played at the university in 1910. The game, an interclass exhibition match played at that years commencement track meet, was between teams made up of students in the classes of 1910 and 1912 against students in the classes of 1911 and 1913. The match ended in a 0–0 draw but helped propel the demand for future soccer competition at the university. Penn State's athletic director and head football coach Pop Golden announced in May 1911 he would support any interclass games with the presentation of a trophy to the winning team. With popularity growing, another interclass game was played on New Beaver Field in June 1911 between the classes of 1913 and 1914. These games would eventually turn into the creation of an interclass league at the university, helping grow the sport's popularity on campus.

An official Penn State varsity soccer team was introduced in December 1911 with the scheduling of three road matches facing intercollegiate national champion Haverford College, as well as Westtown School and the University of Pennsylvania. At the time Penn State was one of only 17 varsity sponsored soccer teams fielded across the United States.

Fielding a 14-man roster and being coached by a student manager the Nittany Lions set off for Philadelphia to debut in December 1911. Lacking university funds for the trip equipment and trip costs were paid with a $100 (equivalent to $3,336 in 2025) donation from Penn State alumnus James G. White. The Nittany Lions played their inaugural match on December 19, 1911, against the previous year's national champion Haverford College, the squad fell 3–2. The team finished the road series drawing their matches against Westtown School 1–1 on December 20 and University of Pennsylvania 0–0 on December 21.

The Nittany Lion's abandoned their 1917 Fall season after one match was played due to the United States entering World War I.

=== Bill Jeffrey era ===
From the late 1920s into the late 1940s Penn State was noted as one of the top college soccer programs in the United States. Leading the team from the 1920s to the 1960s was head coach Bill Jeffrey who was able to accumulate ten national championship wins, a record 138 wins and a 65-game unbeaten streak. Jeffrey was inducted to the National Soccer Hall of Fame in 1951 for his coaching performance and help growing the game of soccer in the United States. The highest success of Penn State's soccer program as well as college soccer of the era was seen under Jeffrey. While head coach Jeffrey lead the Nittany Lions on multiple international tours where they played professional and semiprofessional sides.

==== Intercollegiate Soccer Football Association ====
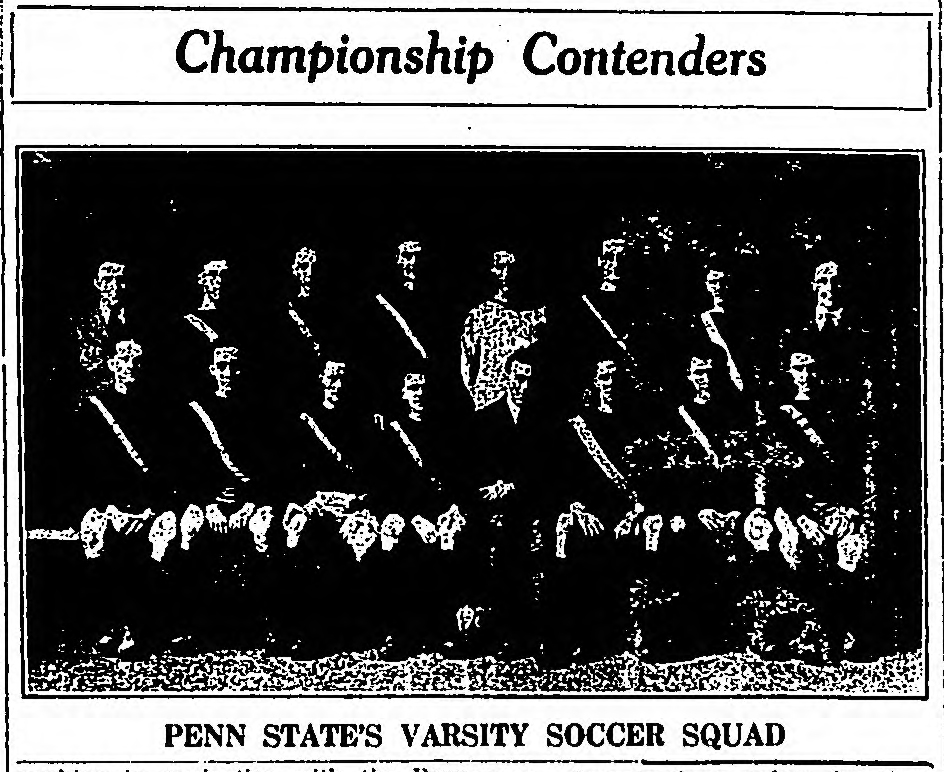
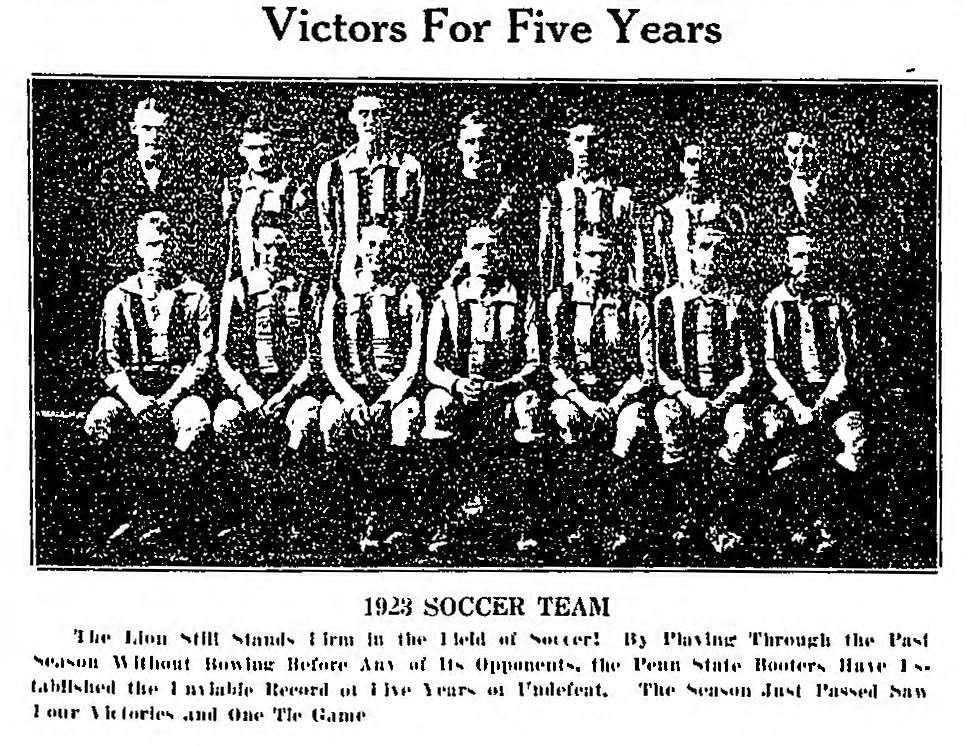
Teams of 1922 (left) and 1923, published in The Penn State Collegian

An application was submitted to the Intercollegiate Soccer Football Association to join the Intercollegiate Soccer League in May 1914. At the time of petition Penn State and Princeton were being considered by the association to become league members. Inevitably, Princeton received an invitation to join the league while and Penn State was left waiting. Penn State continued to petition the Intercollegiate Soccer Football Association with no success.

At the beginning of the 1926 season the Intercollegiate Soccer League was dissolved. Penn State, who had waited 12 years to join the league, was extended an invitation to be a part of a reinvention of former league, now called the Intercollegiate Soccer Football Association. The Intercollegiate Soccer Football Association was created as a broader organization and governing body that would serve as a support a for collegiate soccer across the country.

Receiving an invitation to join the association alongside Penn State were Lehigh, Army, Lafayette, Navy, Colgate, Dartmouth, Williams, Amherst, Wesleyan and all six former members of the Intercollegiate Soccer League. Under the new rules of the association Penn State would be required to play four members of the organization during each season. Instead of a league title, national championships would be awarded by the association at the end of each season. In their first season in the new association the Nittany Lions were crowned Co-National Champions by the Intercollegiate Soccer Football Association along with Princeton and Haverford. The team was the only in the league to remain undefeated.

At the conclusion of the 1930 season, at the annual Intercollegiate Soccer Football Association meeting, it was announced the single league would be replaced by the formation of two leagues new leagues the Middle Atlantic league and New England league. The initial plan put forward by the association was to create two or three leagues that would all separately compete for its own championship cup. This initial motion was voted down by the committee 13–9, but another motion to recognize the New England and Middle Atlantic leagues passed unanimously. The Middle Atlantic League was to be made up for Penn, Princeton, Cornell, Haverford, Swarthmore and Lehigh and the New England League was to be made up of Yale, Harvard and Dartmouth. These two leagues would compete amongst one another with the association selecting a national champion at the end of each season.

It was announced Penn State would continue to be a member of the Intercollegiate Soccer Football Association but was no longer a member of its sanctioned league and would not be eligible for a championship in either league. The reasoning for not admitted Penn State to either of the two new leagues was the university's location. Penn State was not located in either geographical districts that had been set out by the association.

After their dismissal from the league, Penn State and a group of remaining members not admitted petitioned the association to create a third league. Penn State along with the remaining active members Syracuse and Navy as well as the associate members Temple, Western Maryland and Bucknell asked to form a third league, the Eastern League.

==== Scotland Trip ====
The Nittany Lions engaged in a tour of six pre-season exhibition matches in Scotland through 6 weeks during August and September 1934. The team was invited to compete with amateur sides by the Scottish Amateur Football Association becoming the first American soccer team schedule a Scottish tour. The trip was officially sanctioned by the American Amateur Football Association and approved by the Intercollegiate Soccer Football Association. The matches were scheduled by officials at Leith Athletic F.C. Six of team the Nittany Lion's faced had captured a National Amateur Championship in Scotland. The Nittany Lions set sail for Scotland on August 11 of 1934 aboard the RMS Cameronia.

Penn State was suspended for championship contention by the Intercollegiate Soccer Football Association in January 1935. The team was suspended for using players from other schools as well as a coach in their exhibition matches in Scotland. Penn State's head coach Bill Jeffrey defended its actions by stating players on the trip had become sick and there was a need for substitutes to prevent scheduled games from being canceled. The team was reinstated for the 1935 season championship and no other sanctions were put on the team.

==== Unbeaten Streak ====
Penn State holds the longest men's soccer collegiate unbeaten streaks at 65 games. The unbeaten streak spanned from 1932 to 1941 with the Nittany Lions claiming 60 wins and 5 draws. The streak started on November 5, 1932, in a match against Army that was won 2-1 and ended in a November 15, 1941 loss to Army. One of the most notable seasons was 1935, where the team had a perfect 7–0–0 record and conceded zero goals to opponents. At the end of the 1940 season the team had scored 250 goals while only allowing 31 goals. Citing the pressure to uphold the streak then head coach Bill Jeffrey told the Associated Press in 1940 a loss might be a good thing for the team after they had gone 61 games without a loss.

==== Title Denial ====
The Nittany Lions were denied the Eastern Intercollegiate Soccer Football Association in 1935 title due to the team not playing four active members of the ISFA, the team instead received an honorable mention by the association. Penn State's schedule originally featured four active members but Syracuse was later suspended for the 1935 season due to only playing 3 league contests in 1934. The team instead received an honorable mention by the association. As a fix to future scheduling issues the association removed its four active member game mandate and instead would choose a champion based on strength of schedule. This change also made every school actively participating in the association into an active member.

==== Trip to Iran ====
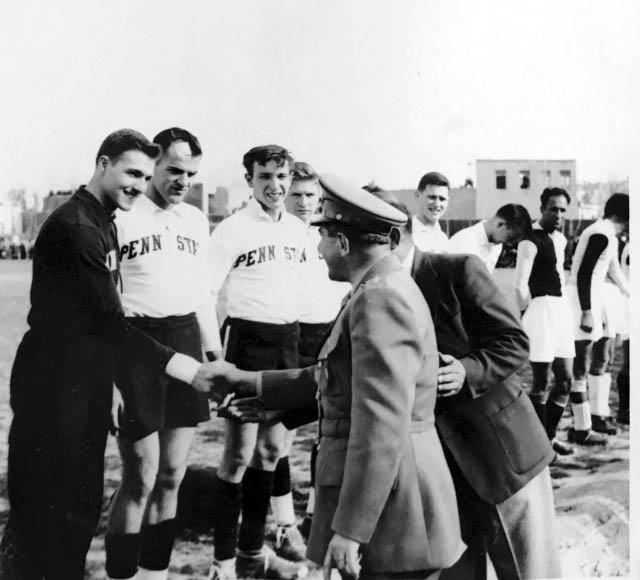
Penn State players greeted by Iranian local authorities during the team's 1951 tour

Arranged by the United States Department of State after an invitation by the Iranian Athletic Association for a diplomatic soccer tour of the country during the college's 1951 Easter break, the reigning 1950 National Champions Penn State were slated to play three goodwill games in Iran in the midst of the Cold War. Complications arose weeks before the Nittany Lions were set to start their tour when Iranian Prime Minister Haj Ali Razmara was assassinated. After safety consideration, the team and games were allowed to go ahead as planned.

The team consisted of head coach Bill Jeffrey, 15 players and a student manager. On March 21, 1951, the team flew from the U.S. to Shannon, Ireland, then to Paris, Geneva, and Damascus before landing in Tehran two days later on Friday, March 23. After arriving in Tehran, Iran the team made an official visit to the U.S. Embassy in Iran and met with U.S. ambassador to Iran, Dr. Henry F. Grady.

Their first match was played in Isfahan, Iran on March 24. An estimated crowd of 500 was waiting to greet the team while a line of soldiers restrained the crowd. As the team bus drove through the city, they were followed by bicyclists attempting to shake hands with the team. According to reports, one bicyclist was knocked down and killed under the wheels of a military truck. The Nittany Lions lost their first match 2–0 to the Isfahan club team in front of an estimated crowd of 5,000. After the match, spectators stormed the field celebrating both teams. The team's second match was played in Shiraz, Iran on March 25. The match began with an own-goal scored by a Shiraz player. Goals from Harold Irvin and Ronald Coleman claimed a 3–0 final. After the match, Penn State's goalkeeper Ron Coder was picked up and carried to the team bus in celebration by locals. Their final match was played in Tehran, Iran at Amjadieh Stadium against an Iranian all-star squad. The Nittany Lions fell to the group 5–0. The match was photographed and published as part of George W. Long's 1951 assignment for National Geographic entitled, “Journey Into Troubled Iran”. The team left Tehran, Iran on April 3.

=== Transitional Era ===
The Nittany Lions, coming off of back-to-back national titles, the retirement of its most prolific head coach William Jeffrey and a decade of collegiate soccer dominance fell in the 1960s and 1970s. The era was marked largely a transitional period for Penn State men's soccer.

=== Walter Bahr Era ===
==== Match against United States National Team ====
The United States men's national soccer team slated a tour against college and senior amateur teams in 1985 aimed to promote soccer and finalize selections for the 1986 FIFA World Cup. The Penn State Nittany Lion's faced off against the national team side at Jeffrey Field On April 26, 1985, at 7:30 p.m. in front of 1,500 fans. The match was the sixth and final played by the United States during their tour.

Penn State opened the scoring in the 27th minute with a strike from midfielder Troy Snyder to make the game 1–0. Shortly after the United States responded with a goal of their own in the 36th minute from midfielder Amr Aly to make the game 1-1. Penn State, making seven saves in the second half, preserved a 1–1 draw.

Head coach of the United States Alkis Panagoulias expressed pleasure with the competition Penn State provided. "I was very pleased to see a very good college team here. I think Walter Bahr is doing a good job here," Panagoulias shared after the match.

The U.S.A. Soccer National Team & PSU Coaching Legacy.

100 Years, 4 Generations of Penn State Coaching History

Coach Jeffrey was the head coach of Penn State University starting in the early 1920s and later became the Men's national team head coach in the world cup. Jeffrey died in 1966 with his coaching lineage working through four generations at Penn State University. The captain of Jeffrey's 1950 USA team, Walter Bahr coached at Penn State from 1974 to 1988. His assistant, Barry Gorman, later succeeded him as head coach, keeping the Penn State job through the 2009 season. In 2021, it is back in Altoona, Pennsylvania where the connection to Jeffrey continues. Coach Gorman's youth player, Fraser Kershaw, took the head coaching job at Penn State Altoona. The coaching connection reaches four separate generations of soccer, reaching a 100-year continual coaching succession.

=== Modern conference play ===
==== Atlantic 10 Conference ====
Penn State men's soccer, and other school sanctioned sports, joined the Atlantic 10 Conference in 1987 as a charter member of what was then called the Eastern Athletic Association and informally known as the Eastern 8. The league comprised Penn State, Rutgers, West Virginia, Duquesne, George Washington and UMass. While participating in the league Penn State won three Atlantic 10 Men's Soccer Tournament championships, made it to four tournament finals, and finished first in the conference table winning the regular season three times. After 4 seasons of play Penn State withdrew from the Atlantic 10 Conference at the conclusion of the 1990 season to join the Big Ten Conference.

== Uniforms, crest and colors ==
The Penn State Nittany Lions men's soccer team wears the school's navy and white colors and displays the same insignia on their uniforms as their fellow athletic teams. The team does not have a traditional crest, instead uses the Penn State wordmark across the chest of the team's kit.

The team's home kit features a majority white top with a navy collar and thin, short, dark blue streaks speckled across the entire jersey. The kit top is combined with navy shorts and white socks. The Nike logo and Big Ten logo sit on the right and left pectoral area above a Penn State wordmark logo. Featured on the right sleeve in navy is the state of Pennsylvania with a star marking the location of State College, Pennsylvania. Featured on the left sleeve in navy is the Penn State Nittany Lion athletics logo. Under Penn State's wordmark each players individual number is presented in navy. The kit was introduced during the 2019 season.

The team's away kit features a solid navy top with a white collar. The kit top is combined with navy shorts and navy socks. The Nike logo and Big Ten logo sit on the right and left pectoral area. A centered player number in white sits below the Nike and Big Ten logo.

== Stadium ==
=== New Beaver Field (1911–1961) ===
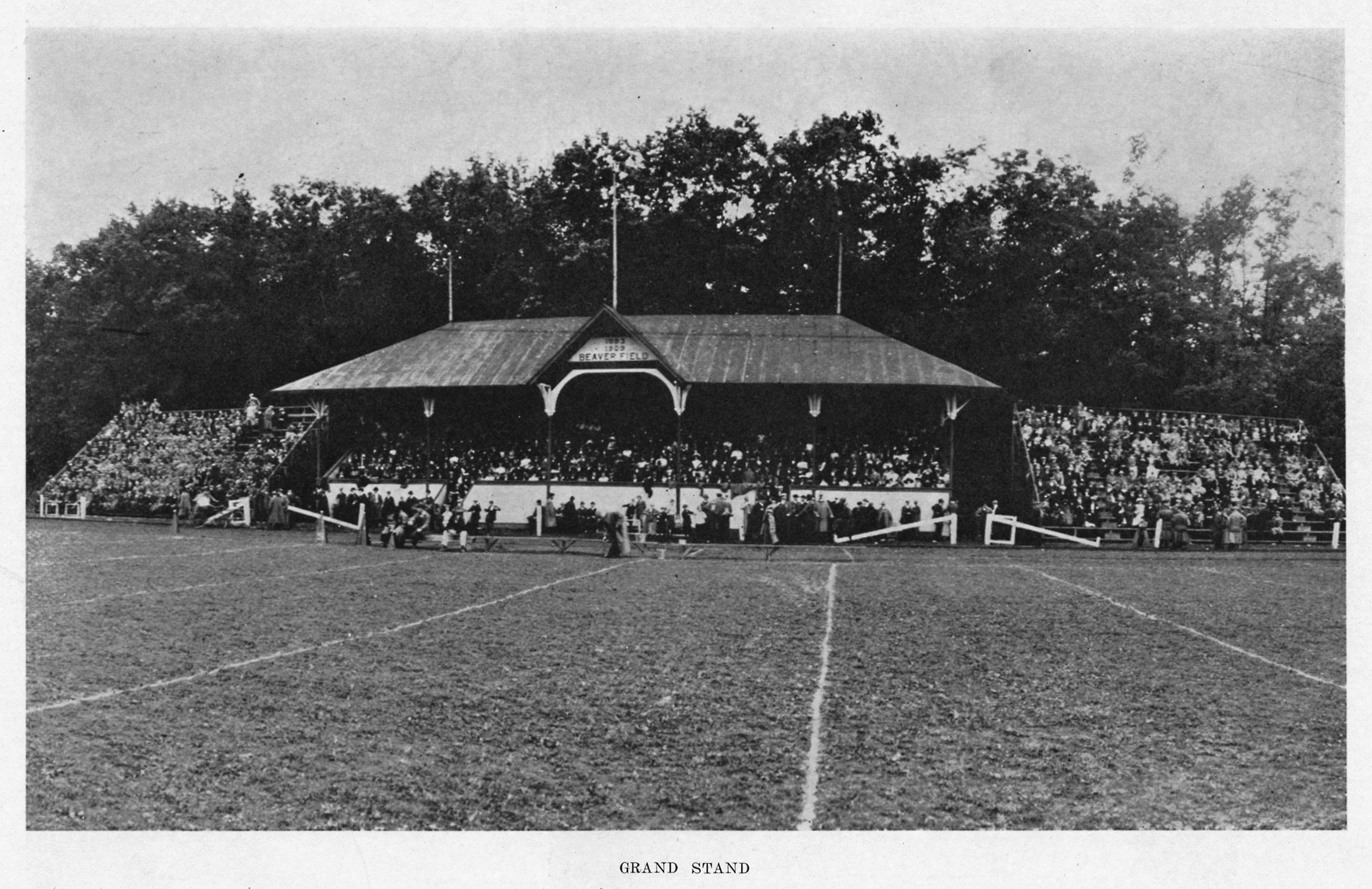
Penn State football hosts Bucknell University at New Beaver Field, November 12, 1910

New Beaver Field was a stadium in Penn State University Park. It served as the first home of Penn State's men's soccer team, hosting the team until they moved in 1960 to Beaver Stadium. The first varsity soccer home game played by Penn State took place in April 1914 at New Beaver Field when the Nittany Lions defeated the Lafayette Leopards 6–0. The team played for an enthusiastic, but small crowd.

=== Soccer Field (1960–1971) ===
Nittany Lions split time between Beaver Field and the Soccer Fields adjacent to the Ice Rink until the opening of the stadium in 1971.

=== Jeffrey Field (1972–present) ===
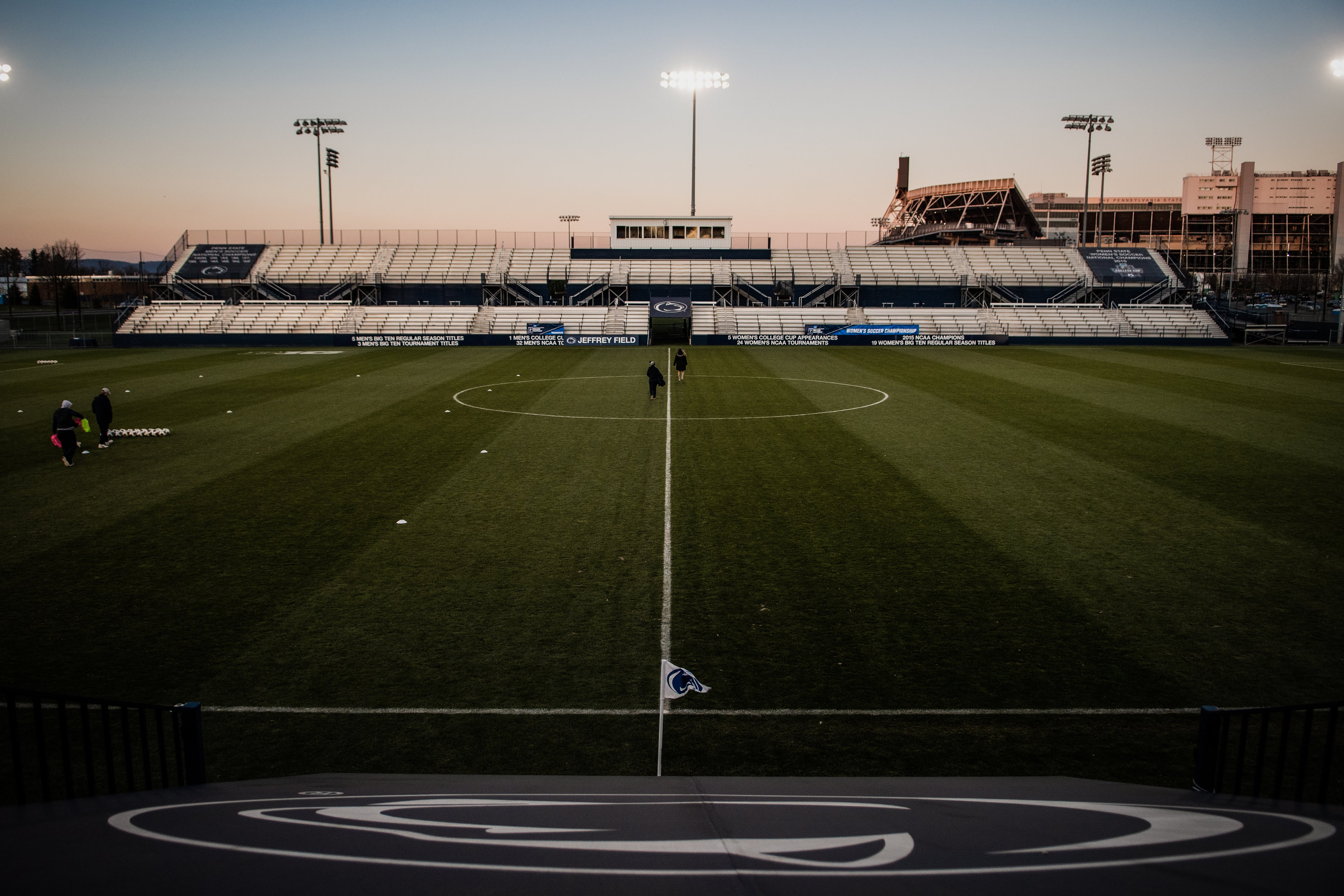
Jeffrey Field

The Nittany Lions began play at Jeffrey Field in 1972 when the 5,000-seater stadium opened. The stadium was dedicated to the late Bill Jeffrey who was the team's head coach from 1926 until 1952 and a National Soccer Hall of Fame member. Built for the soccer and lacrosse teams, Jeffrey Field had an initial seating capacity of 2,500. Jeffrey Field was first remodeled in 1978, bleachers were added to expand the capacity to 3,500 along with fencing and a practice field. In 1996 the lights were updated prior to the season start. During the summer of 2003, Jeffrey Field again underwent a facelift. In addition to the installation of a new field surface, a press box and a video booth were also added, and the bleachers were expanded to a capacity of 5,000. Team locker rooms were added in 2013, and in August 2014 branding windscreens were installed. Jeffrey Field was honored in 2006 as the Collegiate Soccer Field of the Year by the SportsTurf Managers Association.

== Supporters ==
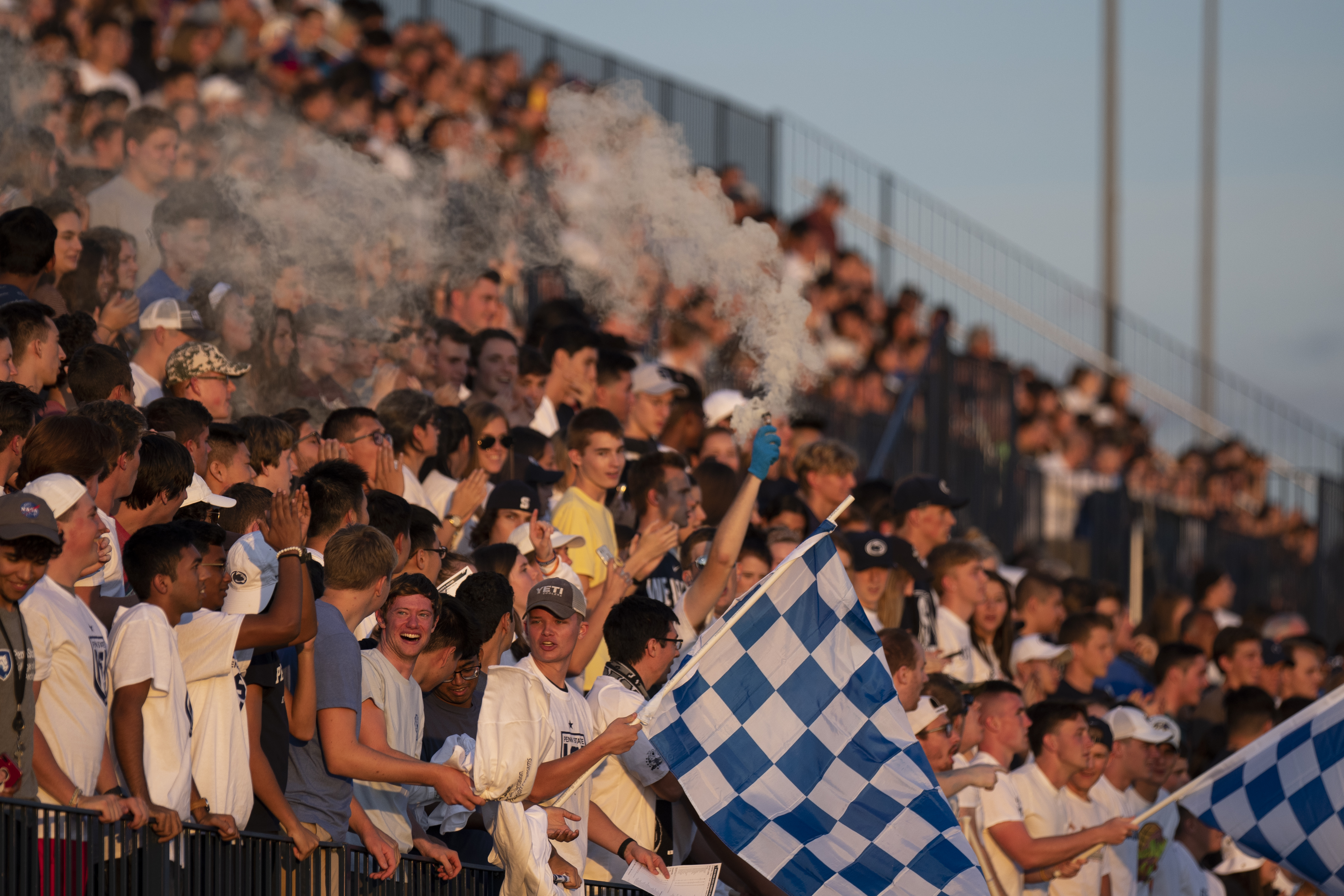
The Park Avenue Army celebrate a goal during the match against No. 3 Stanford on Friday, August 23, 2019, at Jeffrey Field in State College

The Park Avenue Army is a supporters group for Penn State men's soccer and Penn State women's soccer. The group was formed as two separate groups, Park Avenue Army and Sons of Jeffrey in 2011 and 2015 respectively. The groups were formally combined under one banner and leadership in 2019. Members occupy the northwest stand of Jeffrey Field during home matches. The group engages in many of the traditional Penn State chants including the "We Are" chant, Zombie Nation as well other American soccer chants like “I Believe That We Will Win”.

== Players ==
=== Current roster ===
As of Nov 2025

Note: Flags indicate national team as defined under FIFA eligibility rules; some limited exceptions apply. Players may hold more than one non-FIFA nationality.

No.	Pos.	Nation	Player
2	DF	USA	Ben Nash
3	DF	SCO	Matthew Henderson
4	DF	USA	Samuel Ovesen
5	DF	ENG	Joe Sheridan
6	MF	CAN	Malick Daouda
7	FW	DEN	Jeppe Runge
8	FW	USA	Christian Dionne
10	MF	ENG	Freddie Bell
11	MF	USA	Caden Grabfelder
12	DF	USA	Matiwos Rumley
14	DF	USA	Morgan Marshall
15	DF	USA	Matt Eger
16	MF	IRL	Davy Leavey

No.	Pos.	Nation	Player
18	FW	USA	Frederik Flaskager
19	FW	TTO	Kai Phillip
20	MF	USA	Ben Liscum
21	MF	USA	Ben Madore
22	FW	USA	Van Danielson
23	FW	USA	Conor Clair
24	DF	USA	Sebastian Delacruz
26	DF	USA	Conrad Brady
27	GK	USA	Jonathan Evans
28	FW	CAN	Riley Ferraro
29	GK	SWE	Drew Mattingly
30	GK	SWE	Fredrick Grundin
33	MF	USA	Nziza Siibo

=== Individual awards ===
Honor	Wins	Recipient & season
Hermann Trophy	1	Jim Stamatis (1979)
United Soccer Coaches Coach of the Year	1	Walter Bahr (1979)
Big Ten Offensive Player of the Year	4	Jason Yeisley (2009), Connor Maloney (2014), Peter Mangione (2021, 2023)
Big Ten Defensive Player of the Year	1	Femi Awodesu (2023)
Big Ten Goalkeeper of the Year	2	Andrew Wolverton (2013), Kris Shakes (2023)
Big Ten Midfielder Player of the Year	1	Aaron Molloy (2019)
Big Ten Freshman of the Year	4	Stuart Reid (1992), Rich Wilmot (1993), Chad Severs (2001), Richard Costanzo (2004)
Big Ten Coach of the Year	7	Barry Gorman (2001, 2003, 2004), Bob Warming (2012, 2013), Jeff Cook (2021, 2023)
Senior CLASS Award	1	Jason Yeisley (2009)
First Team All-American	66	Forward: Ed Pecori (1926), Dick Marshall (1927, 1928), Bill Lutz (1929), Bud Anderson (1930), Joe Bielicki (1933, 1934), Ed Finzel (1933), Bill McEwan (1934), Anibal Galindo (1940, 1941), Woody King (1941), Jose Lonbana (1942, 1943), Matlack (1945), Harry Little (1949, 1950), Dick Packer (1954, 1955), John Pinezich (1954, 1955), Per Torgenson (1957), Andy Rymarczuk (1972), Rich Reice (1977), Jim Stamatis (1978), Ricardo Villar (1999)
First Team All-American	66	Defender: George Lippencott (1926), F. Strimlan (1927), Don Edgerton (1927), Herb Allen (1929), Al Daykin (1931, 1932), Frank Evans (1932), Jack Fletcher (1933), Bob Graham (1933, 1934), Bill Sutliff (1934), Walter Hosterman (1939, 1940), Dean Hartman (1942, 1946), John Hamilton (1945, 1946), Ralph Hosterman (1948), Chris Bahr (1972, 1973, 1974), Dan Canter (1981), Lou Karbiener (1982)
First Team All-American	66	Goalkeeper: Bob McCune (1929, 1931), Ray Bell (1933, 1934), Gene Graebner (1944)
First Team All-Big Ten	62	Forward: Stuart Reid (1992, 1993 1994, 1995), Chris Kelly (1993), Travis Berger (1995), Jeff Lear (1996), Jon McClay (1996, 1998), Phil Karn (1997), Ricardo Villar (1999, 2001), Simon Omekanda (2005, 2006), Jason Yeisley (2007, 2009), Corey Hertzog (2010), Jordan Tyler (2013), Connor Maloney (2014, 2015, 2016), Liam Butts (2019), Danny Bloyou (2020), Peter Mangione (2021, 2023)
First Team All-Big Ten	62	Midfielder: Steve Sergi (1991, 1992), Neil Piper (1993), Sebastien Gouverneur (1994, 1995, 1996), Drew Kaufmann (1995), Derek Potteiger (1998, 2000, 2001), Brent Jacquette (2001, 2002), Brian Devlin (2003), David Walters (2004, 2005), Jeff Chambers (2006), Matheus Braga (2009, 2010), Jacob Barron (2012), Aaron Molloy (2019), Pierre Reedy (2020)
First Team All-Big Ten	62	Defender: Nigel Sparks (1991, 1992), Joe Corapi (1993, 1994), Michael Coll (1995, 1996), Ben Dawson (2001), Andres Casais (2009), John Gallagher (2012), Martin Seiler (2013), Brandon Hackenberg (2019, 2020, 2021), Femi Awodesu (2023)
First Team All-Big Ten	62	Goalkeeper: Conrad Taylor (2005, 2006), Andrew Wolverton (2013)

=== Notable alumni ===
- Chris Bahr - 2× Super Bowl champion
- Matt Bahr - 2× Super Bowl champion
- Dan Canter - U.S. national team player
- Ronald Coder - Olympian
- Randy Garber - U.S. national team player
- Ted Gillen - U.S. national team player
- Danny Kelly - United States men's national team player Indoor soccer titles
- Dick Packer - Olympian
- Andy Rymarczuk - U.S. national team player
- Troy Snyder - U.S. national team player
- Kenji Treschuk - USL First Division Champion
- Corey Hertzog - 13th overall in the 2011 MLS SuperDraft

=== Career goals ===
As of May 25, 2020

#	Name	Career	Total
1	(Northern Ireland) Stuart Reid	1992-1995	56
2	(United States) Dick Packer	1953-1955	53
3	(United States) Jim Stamatis	1976-1979	52
4	(Norway) Jan Skorpen	1986-1989	47
5	(United States) Bill McEwan	1934-1936	46
6	(United States) Chris Bahr	1971-1974	45
7	(Socialist Federal Republic of Yugoslavia) Peter Jancevski	1978-1981	43
8	(United States) John Pinezich	1951-1954	41
9	(United States) Chad Severs	2001-2004	38
10	(United States) Rich Reice	1974-1977	37

=== Career assists ===
As of May 25, 2020

#	Name	Career	Total
1	(United States) Chris Kelly	1990-1993	32
2	(Brazil) Ricardo Villar	1997-2001	31
3	(Greece) Jim Stamatis	1976-1979	29
4	(United States) Neil Piper	1991-1993	28
4	(Brazil) Matheus Braga	2008-2010	28
6	(Scotland) Duncan MacEwan	1978-1981	27
7	(United States) Simon Omekanda	2003-2006	26
8	(United States) Chris Bahr	1971-1974	22
8	(United States) John Marsden	1972-1975	22
10	(Republic of Ireland) Niall Harrison	1983-1986	20

== Team yearly records ==
Season	Coach	Overall	Conference	Standing	Postseason
No Coach (Independent) (1911–1915)
1911	No Coach	0–1–2			
1912	No Coach	2–0–1			
1913	No Coach	1–2–0			
1914	No Coach	2–3–0			
1915	No Coach	0–3–0			
No Coach:		5–6–3			
Jim Crowell (Independent) (1916–1917)
1916	Jim Crowell	3–0–1			
1917	Jim Crowell	2–0–0			
Jim Crowell:		5–0–1			
No Coach (Independent) (1918–1918)
1918	No Coach	2–1–0			
No Coach:		2–1–0			
Jim Crowell (Independent) (1919–1920)
1919	Jim Crowell	3–0–0			
1920	Jim Crowell	4–0–1			
Jim Crowell:		7–0–1			
Compton Packenham (Independent) (1921–1921)
1921	Compton Pakenham	2–0–1			
Compton Pakenham:		2–0–1			
Hugh Keenleyside (Independent) (1922–1922)
1922	Hugh Keenleyside	2–0–2			
Hugh Keenleyside:		2–0–2			
Larry Longhurst (Independent) (1923–1923)
1923	Larry Longhurst	4–0–1			
Larry Longhurst:		4–0–1			
Ralph Leonard (Independent) (1924–1925)
1924	Ralph Leonard	5–0–0			
1925	Ralph Leonard	4–1–0			
Ralph Leonard:		9–1–1			
William Jeffrey (Intercollegiate Soccer Football Association) (1926–1952)
1926	William Jeffrey	4–0–1			
1927	William Jeffrey	5–3–1			
1928	William Jeffrey	4–1–3			
1929	William Jeffrey	6–0–1			
1930	William Jeffrey	5–1–2			
1931	William Jeffrey	4–0–3			
1932	William Jeffrey	3–3–0			
1933	William Jeffrey	6–0–0			
1934	William Jeffrey	6–0–1			
1935	William Jeffrey	7–0–0			
1936	William Jeffrey	6–0–2			
1937	William Jeffrey	7–0–1			
1938	William Jeffrey	6–0–2			
1939	William Jeffrey	7–0–1			
1940	William Jeffrey	8–0–0			
1941	William Jeffrey	6–1–0			
1942	William Jeffrey	6–1–0			
1943	William Jeffrey	1*–1–5*			
1944	William Jeffrey	3–4–0			
1945	William Jeffrey	2–2–1			
1946	William Jeffrey	7–1–1			
1947	William Jeffrey	5–2–1			
1948	William Jeffrey	7–1–1			
1949	William Jeffrey	8–0–1			Soccer Bowl Co-Champion
1950	William Jeffrey	9–1–0			Soccer Bowl Champion
1951	William Jeffrey	5–1–2			
1952	William Jeffrey	8–1–1			
William Jeffrey:		153–24–29			
Ken Hosterman (Intercollegiate Soccer Football Association) (1953–1967)
1953	Ken Hosterman	5–2–0			
1954	Ken Hosterman	9–0–0			
1955	Ken Hosterman	9–0–0			
1956	Ken Hosterman	8–2–1			
1957	Ken Hosterman	8–1–1			
1958	Ken Hosterman	5–4–0			
1959	Ken Hosterman	2–7–0			
1960	Ken Hosterman	3–6–0			
1961	Ken Hosterman	3–6–0			
1962	Ken Hosterman	3–6–0			
1963	Ken Hosterman	5–4–0			
1964	Ken Hosterman	4–5–0			
1965	Ken Hosterman	3–6–0			
1966	Ken Hosterman	1–7–2			
1967	Ken Hosterman	5–4–1			
Ken Hosterman:		72–60–5			
Herb Schmidt (NCAA Independent) (1968–1973)
1968	Herb Schmidt	0–6–3			
1969	Herb Schmidt	3–6–0			
1970	Herb Schmidt	9–3–0			NCAA Tournament first round
1971	Herb Schmidt	9–3–1			NCAA Tournament Quarterfinals
1972	Herb Schmidt	9–1–2			NCAA Tournament second round
1973	Herb Schmidt	8–2–2			NCAA Tournament second round
Herb Schmidt:		38–21–8			
Walter Bahr (NCAA Independent) (1974–1987)
1974	Walter Bahr	8–1–3			NCAA Tournament first round
1975	Walter Bahr	9–5–1			NCAA Tournament first round
1976	Walter Bahr	10–4–1			NCAA Tournament first round
1977	Walter Bahr	10–4–1			NCAA Tournament second round
1978	Walter Bahr	13–3–0			NCAA Tournament first round
1979	Walter Bahr	18–4–1			NCAA Tournament Third-Place
1980	Walter Bahr	18–3–1			NCAA Tournament Third round
1981	Walter Bahr	15–5–1			NCAA Tournament second round
1982	Walter Bahr	16–5–2			NCAA Tournament second round
1983	Walter Bahr	11–8–1			NCAA Tournament second round
1984	Walter Bahr	11–5–1			NCAA Tournament second round
1985	Walter Bahr	15–6–1			NCAA Tournament Third round
1986	Walter Bahr	12–6–5			NCAA Tournament Third round
Walter Bahr (Atlantic 10) (1987–1988)
1987	Walter Bahr	12–6–3	2–0–1	1st West	Atlantic 10 Champion
Walter Bahr:		185–66–22	2–0–1		
Barry Gorman (Atlantic 10) (1988–1990)
1988	Barry Gorman	14–7–3	3–0–0	1st West	Atlantic 10 Champion, NCAA Tournament first round
1989	Barry Gorman	10–11–2	3–0–0	1st West	Atlantic 10 Champion, NCAA Tournament first round
1990	Barry Gorman	11–8–2	6–1–1	2nd	Atlantic 10 Finalist
Barry Gorman (Big Ten Conference) (1991–2009)
1991	Barry Gorman	11–9–0	3–3–0	3rd	
1992	Barry Gorman	16–8–0	3–2–0	T-3rd	NCAA Tournament second round, Big Ten Runner-up
1993	Barry Gorman	17–4–2	3–2–1	4th	Big Ten Champion, NCAA Tournament second round
1994	Barry Gorman	16–6–1	4–1–0	2nd	NCAA Tournament second round, Big Ten Runner-up
1995	Barry Gorman	15–5–0	4–1–0	T-1st	NCAA Tournament first round
1996	Barry Gorman	11–6–2	2–2–1	T-3rd	
1997	Barry Gorman	10–10–1	2–3–0	T-4th	
1998	Barry Gorman	14–6–2	4–1–0	2nd	NCAA Tournament second round, Big Ten Runner-up
1999	Barry Gorman	19–4–1	3–2–0	T-2nd	NCAA Tournament Third round, Big Ten Runner-up
2000	Barry Gorman	13–6–2	3–2–1	3rd	Big Ten Runner-up
2001	Barry Gorman	14–5–1	4–1–1	2nd	NCAA Tournament Regional semifinal
2002	Barry Gorman	16–8–2	3–3–0	T-2nd	Big Ten Champion, NCAA Tournament Regional Final
2003	Barry Gorman	9–10–1	1–5–0	6th	Big Ten Runner-up
2004	Barry Gorman	10–4–8	1–3–2	6th	NCAA Tournament second round
2005	Barry Gorman	13–7–2	6–0–0	1st	Big Ten Champion, NCAA Tournament Regional semifinals
2006	Barry Gorman	7–11–2	3–3–0	4th	NCAA Tournament Regional semifinals
2007	Barry Gorman	7–8–4	2–2–2	4th	
2008	Barry Gorman	5–11–3	2–4–0	5th	
2009	Barry Gorman	12–8–2	3–2–1	2nd	NCAA Tournament second round, Big Ten Runner-up
Barry Gorman:		266–158–42	68–43–10		
Bob Warming (Big Ten Conference) (2010–2017)
2010	Bob Warming	14–8–1	2–3–1	5th	NCAA Tournament Regional semifinals, Big Ten Runner-up
2011	Bob Warming	9–9–4	0–6–0	7th	Big Ten Runner-up
2012	Bob Warming	9–5–3	3–1–2	T-1st	Big Ten Semifinals
2013	Bob Warming	13–6–2	5–1–0	1st	NCAA Tournament Third round, Big Ten Semifinals
2014	Bob Warming	13–6–1	5–3–0	T-2nd	NCAA Tournament second round, Big Ten Quarterfinals
2015	Bob Warming	7–8–3	2–4–2	8th	NCAA Tournament second round, Big Ten Play-in Round
2016	Bob Warming	8–8–2	4–4–0	5th	Big Ten Quarterfinals
2017	Bob Warming	5–10–2	2–6–0	7th	Big Ten Quarterfinals
Bob Warming:		78–60–18	23–28–5		
Jeff Cook (Big Ten Conference) (2018–present)
2018	Jeff Cook	6–9–2	3–3–2	6th	Big Ten Quarterfinals
2019	Jeff Cook	12–4–3	6–1–1	2nd	NCAA second round, Big Ten Semifinals
2020†	Jeff Cook	8–1–2	8–1–2	2nd	Big Ten Finals, NCAA Tournament Round of 16
2021	Jeff Cook	13–7–1	6–2–0	1st	Big Ten Champion, NCAA Tournament second round
2022	Jeff Cook	6–6–4	3–2–3	5th	
2023	Jeff Cook	10–4–5	4–2–2	2nd	Big Ten Finals
2024	Jeff Cook	5–9–2	2–6–2	11th	
Jeff Cook:		59–40–17	31–17–10		
Total:		884–438–150			
National champion Postseason invitational champion Conference regular season champion Conference regular season and conference tournament champion Division regular season champion Division regular season and conference tournament champion Conference tournament champion

† Season postponed

Refs

== Honors and awards ==
Competition	Titles	Winning years
ISFL / ISFA national championship	11	1926, 1929, 1933, 1936, 1937, 1938, 1939, 1940, 1949, 1954, 1955
Big Ten tournament	4	1993, 2002, 2005, 2021
Big Ten regular season	6	1995, 2005, 2012, 2013, 2021, 2023
Atlantic 10 tournament	3	1987, 1988, 1989
Soccer Bowl	2	1950, 1951

== Coaches ==
=== Honors and awards ===
- William Jeffrey - National Soccer Hall of Fame member
- Walter Bahr - National Soccer Hall of Fame member
