= Iowa Hawkeyes men's soccer =

American college soccer team

- Founded: 1872
- Folded: 1888; 138 years ago
- University: University of Iowa
- Location: Iowa City, Iowa, US
- Colors: Black and gold
Home

The Iowa Hawkeyes men's soccer team represented the State University of Iowa (now University of Iowa) in college soccer competitions from 1872 until 1892. The team won unofficial pre-regulation national titles in 1884, 1886, and 1888 per ASHA/IFRA. While there was no formal way to gauge a national champion, ASHA and IFRA crowned Iowa's teams during the 1880s as national champions de facto by having the best record among organized college soccer teams that played friendly matches against other schools.

The first known soccer team to represent the university was in 1872 and the final known team played in 1888. The school has had a club team presence since then, but no varsity team.

== Seasons ==
Statistics overview
Season	Coach	Overall	Conference	Standing	Postseason
Iowa Hawkeyes (Independent) (1872–1888)
1872–73	Unknown	-?-		-?-	
1873–82	No program	-?-		-?-	
1882–83	Unknown	-?-		-?-	
1883–84	Unknown	2–0–0		1st	ASHA/IFRA national champions
1884–85	Unknown	-?-		-?-	
1885–86	Unknown	-?-		-?-	ASHA/IFRA national champions
1886–87	Unknown	-?-		-?-	
1887–88	Unknown	-?-		-?-	ASHA/IFRA national champions
Total:					
National champion Postseason invitational champion Conference regular season champion Conference regular season and conference tournament champion Division regular season champion Division regular season and conference tournament champion Conference tournament champion

== See also ==
- 1883–84 Iowa Hawkeyes men's soccer team
