= Bob Warming =

American soccer coach (born c.1953)

Personal information
- Full name: Robert Warming
- Date of birth: c. 1953 (age 72–73)

College career
Years	Team	Apps	(Gls)
1973–1975	Berea Mountaineers		

Managerial career
- 1976: Transylvania Pioneers
- 1977–1980: Berry Vikings
- 1982–1988: Charlotte 49ers
- 1990–1994: Creighton Bluejays
- 1996: Old Dominion Monarchs
- 1997–2000: Saint Louis Billikens
- 2001–2009: Creighton Bluejays
- 2010–2017: Penn State Nittany Lions
- 2018–2021: Omaha Mavericks
- 2022–: Union Omaha (technical advisor)

Bob Warming (born c. 1953) is an American soccer coach whose final soccer position was technical advisor for Union Omaha in USL League One. A veteran college soccer coach, Warming has coached eight other men's college soccer programs across the United States, including Penn State University, his previous coaching stint, and Creighton University, on two separate stints. Additionally, Warming has coached at Old Dominion University and University of North Carolina at Charlotte, both NCAA Division I institutions.

Warming retired as the winningest active coach in NCAA Division 1 men's soccer. He is one of only three other coaches in NCAA Division I history to take two different schools to the NCAA Division One College Cup final four. His teams at Creighton reached the NCAA tournament in all but his final season at the helm. His 2008 team featured a 15 match unbeaten streak, and an elite eight appearance in the NCAA tournament. He is a member of the Omaha Sports Hall of Fame and Creighton University Sports Hall of Fame.

== Career ==
=== Coaching ===
When he was a senior at Berea College, Warming started the first high school boys soccer program at Berea Community High School as co-head coach with Paul Renner, a fellow senior at Berea College.

Warming began his collegiate coaching career at Transylvania University in Kentucky for one season. He then coached at Berry College in Georgia, where he earned three 'coach of the year' awards. Under his watch, Berry went 61–22–2 in 5 years. At UNC Charlotte he won three 'coach of the year' awards and won the first Sun Belt Conference Tournament Championship in any sport at UNC Charlotte.

He also coached Creighton from 1990 to 1994. His cumulative record at Creighton is 183–57–29. His home field record was 102–16–14, and his Missouri Valley Conference record was 60–13–7. He has led his teams to seven Missouri Valley Conference regular season titles, seven Missouri Valley Conference tournament titles, and eleven NCAA tournament appearances. Warming was selected as two-time NCAA Division 1 National Coach of the Year while at Creighton and also voted the 'centennial coach of the year' in the Missouri Valley Conference. He was a finalist eight times for National Coach of the Year.

From 1997 to 2001, he coached at Saint Louis University. At Saint Louis, his team advanced to the 1997 NCAA Final Four, and won three Conference USA regular season titles, as well as two Conference USA tournament titles. He was instrumental in lobbying for, designing, fundraising and constructing a new all grass playing and training facility on campus.

While at Creighton in his second stint at Creighton, Morrison Stadium was constructed. Warming was instrumental in designing the facility and it features luxury suites and many amenities not typically found in a college soccer stadium. The stadium is unique and has been recognized as the top collegiate soccer stadium in America.

In 2010, Warming was hired to take the vacant head coaching position at Penn State University. At Penn State his teams won the programs first back-to-back BIG10 titles in school history and was number one in the Big 10 for sixteen consecutive weeks over a two-season period. He was voted coach of the year in the BIG10 back-to-back seasons. At the end of the 2017 NCAA Division I men's soccer season, Warming announced his retirement from coaching.

On April 2, 2018, Warming came out of retirement, and was named head coach of the Omaha Maverick men's soccer team, replacing Jay Mims. Warming became the second head men's soccer coach in Omaha history. His team was the first to win an NCAA tournament match in any sport at Omaha since the school transitioned from Division 2 to Division 1.

Warming joined the coaching staff of USL League One club Union Omaha on July 29, 2022, as a technical advisor.

Warming is now fully retired after a nearly 50 year career in collegiate soccer as a player and as a coach. He graduated from Berea College in 1975, where he posted a 28–2–2 record as a starting goalkeeper and lettered in four varsity sports.
