= Mike Berticelli =

American soccer coach

Personal information
- Full name: Michael Berticelli
- Date of birth: April 26, 1951
- Place of birth: Lewiston, Maine, United States
- Date of death: January 25, 2000 (aged 48)
- Place of death: South Bend, Indiana, United States

Managerial career
- Years: Team
- 1976-1979: Thomas College
- 1980–1983: UNC Greensboro
- 1984–1989: Old Dominion University
- 1990–1999: University of Notre Dame

Mike Berticelli (April 26, 1951 – January 25, 2000) was an American college soccer coach.

== Career ==
Coach Berticelli served as the Men's Soccer Coach at Thomas College from 1976 to 1979, compiling a career record of 41-18-2 and was named New England Coach of the Year in 1977, He then made the switch to head men's soccer coach at UNC-Greensboro from 1980 to 1983. He led the Spartans to Division III national championships in 1982 and 1983.

From 1984 to 1989, he was the head men's soccer coach at Old Dominion University, where he posted a 76–27–16 record in six seasons. His teams reached the championship game of the Sun Belt Conference Tournament every year he coached there. He led the Monarchs to two conference championships, and their first ever NCAA tournament appearance. He earned Sun Belt Conference Coach of the Year honors in 1984. The Monarchs were ranked in the top 20 in the nation the last five years he coached there. His teams sprung two upsets at Old Dominion over the No. 1 ranked team in the nation.

From 1990 to 1999, he served as the head men's soccer coach at the University of Notre Dame, where he compiled a 104–80–19(.559) record. He led the Fighting Irish to tournament appearances in 1993, 1994, and 1996. Notre Dame won two Midwestern Collegiate Conference championships and 1 Big East Tournament Coach of the Year title. He ended his career with a record of 291–135–42.

== Death ==
He died on January 25, 2000, at the age of 48.

== Sources ==
- https://web.archive.org/web/20110726234251/http://www.odusports.com/sports/m-soccer/mtt/berticelli_mike00.html
- http://grfx.cstv.com/photos/schools/nd/sports/m-soccer/auto_pdf/08msocmghistoryrecords1.pdf
- https://news.google.com/newspapers?nid=2245&dat=20000126&id=zMY0AAAAIBAJ&sjid=NSEGAAAAIBAJ&pg=3466,2709809
