= San Francisco Dons men's soccer =

American college soccer team

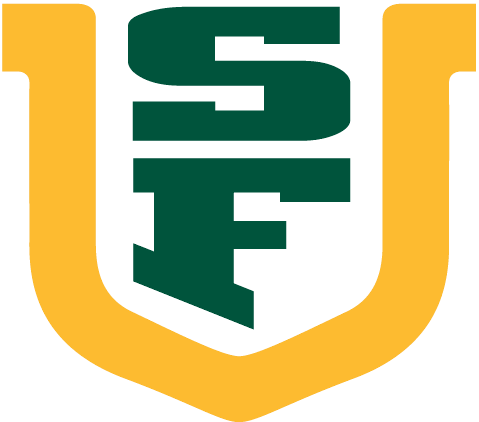
- Founded: 1931; 95 years ago
- University: University of San Francisco
- Head coach: Chris Brown (1st season)
- Conference: WCC
- Location: San Francisco, California
- Stadium: Negoesco Stadium (capacity: 3,000)
- Nickname: Dons
- Colors: Green and gold
Home	Away

Pre-tournament ISFA/ISFL championships
- 1949 (Soccer Bowl)

NCAA tournament championships
- 1966, 1975, 1976, 1978*, 1980

NCAA tournament runner-up
- 1969, 1977

NCAA tournament College Cup
- 1966, 1969, 1971, 1975, 1976, 1977, 1978*, 1980

NCAA tournament appearances
- 1959, 1961, 1963, 1965, 1966, 1967, 1968, 1969, 1970, 1971, 1973, 1974, 1975, 1976, 1977, 1978*, 1979, 1980, 1981, 1982, 1983, 1984, 1986, 1987, 1991, 1993, 1994, 2004, 2005, 2006, 2008*, 2017 *vacated by NCAA

Conference tournament championships
- 1948, 1949, 1950, 1951, 1952, 1953, 1954, 1955, 1956, 1957, 1958, 1963, 1965, 1966, 1971, 1973, 1974, 1975, 1976, 1978, 1980, 1981, 1982, 1984, 1987, 1988, 1991, 1993, 1994, 2004, 2005, 2008, 2017

Conference Regular Season championships
- 2017

The San Francisco Dons men's soccer team represents the University of San Francisco in all men's NCAA Division I competitions. They compete in the West Coast Conference and have previously won national championships in 1966, 1975, 1976, and 1980. They are coached by Chris Brown, who was hired in May 2021.

== Sexual assault allegations ==
In 2021, Sports Illustrated released an article on members of the men's soccer team engaging in sexual harassment and sexual assault of students on campus. The allegations, which first came to surface in 2020 through social media posts, described students who reportedly were taken to "the soccer house" and engaged in hazing. Multiple former and then-current soccer players on USF's men's team were named. USF's Title IX office partnered with the law firm Hulst and Handler to assemble a 53-page report. In addition to finding that 11 individuals engaged in sexual assault, such 11 individuals also engaged in anti-LGBT rhetoric, though such behavior, contrary to the Sports Illustrated, was not found to be pervasive in the soccer program.

Manny Padilla was among the players noted within the allegations and reports. Then the star player for the Dons, Padilla's actions were eventually learned of by the university. Administration at USF found that Padilla engaged in offending behavior, though he was given a deferred suspension, meaning he was permitted to graduate. Upon the allegations surfacing on social media, Padilla was suspended from New Mexico United, then the professional team which he played for, following a Change.org petition.

== Notable alumni ==
- (Greece) Koulis Apostolidis
- (United States) John Doyle
- (United States) Josh Hansen
- (Nigeria) Anthony Igwe
- (United States) Mike Ivanow
- (Guam) Brandon McDonald
- (Norway) Bjørn Tronstad
- (Peru) Alejandro Toledo
- (Nigeria) Godwin Odiye
- (Hong Kong) Matt Orr

== Honours ==
=== National championships ===
- NCAA Division I tournament (4): 1966, 1975, 1976, 1980
- Soccer Bowl (1): 1950

=== Conference championships ===
- California Intercollegiate (11): 1932, 1933, 1934, 1935, 1948, 1949, 1950, 1951, 1952, 1953, 1954
- West Coast (13): 1981, 1982, 1983, 1985, 1986, 1987, 1991, 1993, 1994, 2004, 2005, 2008, 2017
- Pacific Soccer Conference (4): 1977, 1978, 1979, 1980
- Northern California Intercollegiate Soccer Conference (18): 1948, 1949, 1950, 1951, 1952, 1953, 1954, 1955, 1956, 1957, 1958, 1963, 1965, 1966, 1971, 1973, 1974, 1975
