= Walter Bahr =

American soccer player

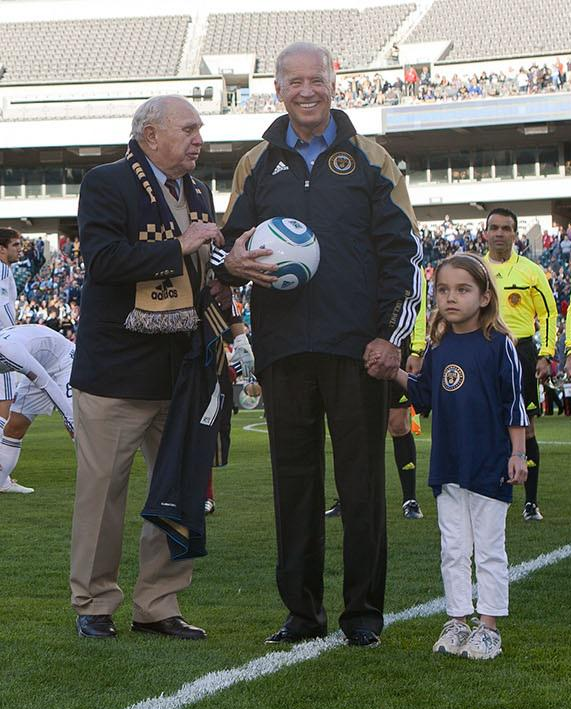
- Bahr (left) with then-Vice President Joe Biden at Philadelphia Union's inaugural match

Personal information
- Full name: Walter Alfred Bahr
- Date of birth: April 1, 1927
- Place of birth: Philadelphia, Pennsylvania, U.S.
- Date of death: June 18, 2018 (aged 91)
- Place of death: Boalsburg, Pennsylvania, U.S.
- Height: 5 ft 11 in (1.80 m)
- Position: Midfielder

Senior career*
| Years | Team | Apps | (Gls) |
- Philadelphia Nationals
| 1953 | → Montréal Hakoah | | |
- Uhrik Truckers
- → Montréal Sparta
- Brookhattan
- Philadelphia United German-Hungarians

International career
| 1948–1957 | United States | 19 | (1) |

Managerial career
- 1969–1970: Philadelphia Spartans
- 1970–1973: Temple Owls
- 1974–1988: Penn State Nittany Lions
- * Club domestic league appearances and goals

Walter Alfred Bahr (April 1, 1927 – June 18, 2018) was an American professional soccer player, considered one of the greatest ever in the United States. He was the long-time captain of the U.S. men's national team and played in the 1950 FIFA World Cup when the U.S. defeated England 1–0. Bahr's three sons Casey, Chris, and Matt, all played professional soccer in the defunct North American Soccer League. Casey and Chris also played for the U.S. Olympic team, and Chris and Matt later became placekickers in the National Football League, each earning two Super Bowl rings.

== Playing career ==
Bahr, a native of Philadelphia, Pennsylvania, began playing soccer at the age of 11 and joined the Philadelphia Nationals of the professional American Soccer League as an amateur player. He was paid a great compliment during the Scottish national team tour of the U.S. in 1949 by former Scottish international Tommy Muirhead, who wrote in the Glasgow Daily Mail, "Bahr is good enough to play for any First Division team in the United Kingdom."

After participating in the 1948 Summer Olympics, Bahr turned professional and helped his club win ASL titles in 1950, 1951, 1953, and 1955. In the summer of 1953, he helped Montréal Hakoah FC reach the Canadian final. He then switched to the Uhrik Truckers, another team in the Philadelphia area, and won the ASL title in 1956. He then joined Montreal Sparta in late August where he won the 1956 Quebec Cup.

As professional soccer players at that time made relatively little money, Bahr also was a high school Phys. Ed. teacher during his playing years and led Frankford HS to several Public League and City Titles in his native Philadelphia. He coached the Philadelphia Spartans of the American Soccer League from 1969 to 1970. He moved to the college ranks to coach Temple University from 1970 to 1973. He then coached Penn State to 12 NCAA tournament appearances from 1974 to 1988, including taking the Nittany Lions to the 1979 semifinals, when he was named College Coach of the Year. He coached two of his sons early in his tenure at Penn State.

Pennsylvania State University Coaching Legacy

100 Years, 4 Generations of Penn State Coaching History

Bahr is linked to Coach Bill Jeffrey, the head coach of Penn State University's men's soccer program in the early 1920s, who later became the men's national team head coach in the World Cup. Coach Jeffrey died in 1966 and his coaching lineage worked through four generations at Penn State University. By 1970, the captain of Jeffrey's 1950 U.S. team, Walter Bahr became the coach at Penn State from 1974 to 1988. His assistant, Barry Gorman, would later succeed him as head coach, keeping the Penn State job through the 2009 season. In 2021, the connection to Jeffrey continues with Coach Gorman's youth player, Fraser Kershaw, who took the head coaching job at Penn State Altoona. The coaching connection reached four separate generations of soccer, reaching a 100-year continual coaching succession.

== National team ==
Bahr was selected to the United States men's national soccer team in 1948 and appeared in 19 games, with one goal. In the 1950 FIFA World Cup, the U.S. upset the English team 1–0, with the goal scored by Joe Gaetjens off a pass by Bahr. The entire team was inducted into the National Soccer Hall of Fame in 1976. Bahr was featured in the 2009 soccer documentary A Time for Champions discussing the U.S. upset victory over England in the 1950 World Cup. Bahr was portrayed by Wes Bentley in the 2005 movie The Game of Their Lives, which has been distributed in DVD under the title "Miracle Match."

== Personal life ==
Bahr's three sons, Casey, Chris and Matt, played professional soccer in the original North American Soccer League. Casey and Chris also played for the U.S. Olympic team, while Chris and Matt became placekickers for the NFL and won Super Bowl titles. The last living member of the 1950 U.S. World Cup team, Bahr died on June 18, 2018, in Boalsburg, Pennsylvania, from complications related to a broken hip.

== See also ==
- List of Pennsylvania State University Olympians
- National Soccer Hall of Fame profile
