= Temple Owls men's soccer =

American college soccer team

- Founded: 1926; 100 years ago
- University: Temple University
- Head coach: Bryan Green (4th season)
- Conference: The American
- Location: Philadelphia, Pennsylvania, US
- Stadium: Temple Owls Sports Complex (capacity: 500)
- Nickname: Owls
- Colors: Cherry and white
Home	Away

Pre-tournament ISFA/ISFL championships
- 1941, 1951, 1953; Soccer Bowl: 1952

NCAA tournament Quarterfinals
- 1966

NCAA tournament Round of 16
- 1966, 1967, 1968, 1976, 1978, 1985

NCAA tournament Round of 32
- 1966, 1967, 1968, 1973, 1976, 1978, 1985

NCAA tournament appearances
- 1966, 1967, 1968, 1973, 1976, 1978, 1985

The Temple Owls men's soccer program represents Temple University in all NCAA Division I men's college soccer competitions. Founded in 1926, the Owls compete in the American Conference. The Owls are coached by Bryan Green. Temple plays their home matches at Temple Owls Sports Complex, on the campus of Temple University.

== Roster ==
As of Jul 2026

Note: Flags indicate national team as defined under FIFA eligibility rules; some limited exceptions apply. Players may hold more than one non-FIFA nationality.

No.	Pos.	Nation	Player
0	GK	USA	Preston Neal
1	GK	USA	Diego Dauzier
2	DF	USA	Erick Hernandez
4	DF	SWE	Nore Sumner
5	MF	USA	Jayden Jackson
6	FW	ISR	Raz Schwartz
7	FW	USA	Wilson Holman
8	MF	AUT	Lukas Egarter
9	FW	CAN	Adrian Panaite
10	MF	NOR	Teo Strand
11	MF	GER	Rocco Haeufgloeckner
12	MF	USA	Anthony Perez
14	DF	NOR	Simon Jordheim
15	FW	SWE	Elliot Rigbert
16	MF	USA	Aiden O'Sullivan
17	DF	AUT	Luka Lukic

No.	Pos.	Nation	Player
18	MF	USA	Chase Jackson
19	FW	USA	Charlie Votel
20	FW	USA	Nathan Brown
21	MF	USA	Danny Dokov
22	MF	USA	Cohen Williams
23	DF	USA	Paolo Kampula
24	MF	USA	George Medill
27	DF	USA	Alex O'Leary
29	MF	USA	Harrison Dandridge
31	GK	USA	Dylan Kaye
34	DF	USA	Michael Siravo

== Coaching history ==
Temple University has had seven coaches in their program's existence.

Years	Coach	Games	W	L	T	%
1926–1929	James Neeley	-	-	-	-	.000
1930–1970	Pete Leanesss	-	-	-	-	.000
1971–1973	Walter Bahr	-	-	-	-	.000
1974–1993	John Boles	-	-	-	-	.000
1994–1997	Hugh McInaw	-	-	-	-	.000
1998–2017	Dave MacWilliams	-	-	-	-	.000
2018-2022	Brian Rowland	-	-	-	-	.000
2023-	Bryan Green					

== Seasons ==
=== NCAA Tournament history ===
Temple has appeared in seven NCAA Tournaments. Their most recent appearance came in 1985.

== Rivalries ==
Located in Philadelphia, the program has long-standing historic rivals with the other university's soccer programs in the area. This includes Drexel of the Colonial Athletic Association, La Salle and Saint Joseph's of the Atlantic 10 Conference, Penn of the Ivy League, and Villanova of the Big East Conference. These five schools are among the Temple's most played opponents. Additionally, Temple has regularly played against Philadelphia U, Penn State, Delaware and Lafayette, due to the school's proximity to Temple.

Historically, the Owls have been rivals with West Chester, but the two sides are now in different divisions, and have not met since 1997.

=== Record against City 6 teams ===
School	Record
Drexel	27–16–4
La Salle	48–17–3
Penn	7–23–6
Saint Joseph's	37–14–7
Villanova	23–10–3
Total	142–80–23

== Individual honors ==
=== All-Americans ===
Sixteen players have been named first-team All-Americans.

- 1942: Pete Lorenc, Forward
- 1944: Walter Bahr, Midfielder
- 1945: Fred Barlow, Defender
- 1946: Fred Barlow, Defender
- 1946: Al Laverson, Midfielder
- 1946: Ben McLaughlin, Forward
- 1947: John Hughes, Forward
- 1947: Tom Lambert, Midfielder
- 1948: Tom Lambert, Midfielder
- 1952: Jack Dunn, Forward
- 1953: Leonard Oliver, Midfielder
- 1954: Jack Dunn, Forward
- 1954: Leonard Oliver, Midfielder
- 1955: Robert Simpson, Midfielder
- 1959: Walter Chyzowych, Forward
- 1959: James Gallo, Midfielder
- 1960: William Charlton, Forward
- 1966: John Boles, Midfielder
- 1967: Louis Meehl, Midfielder
- 1968: Bob Peffle, Defender

== Team honors ==
=== National championships ===
Temple has won four national championships, all of which were national championships prior to the NCAA Division I Men's Soccer Tournament. In 1941, 1951 and 1953, they were determined as national champions by the Intercollegiate Soccer Football Association, and in 1952 they won the Soccer Bowl.

Season	Competition	Organiser	Record/ Score	Coach
1941	Tournament	ISFA	5–0–3	Pete Leaness
1951	Tournament	ISFA	8–0–1	Pete Leaness
1953	Tournament	ISFA	9–0–0	Pete Leaness
1952	Soccer Bowl	ISFA	(2–0) (Note: Indicates match score.)	Pete Leaness
