= William Jeffrey (American soccer) =

American soccer coach

Bill Jeffrey
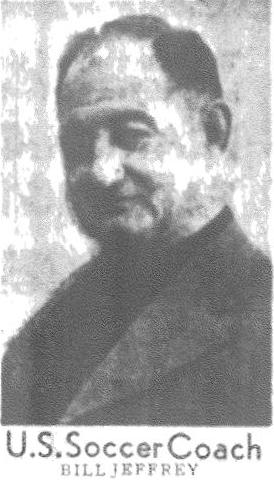

Personal information
- Full name: William Jeffrey
- Date of birth: August 3, 1892
- Place of birth: Edinburgh, Scotland
- Date of death: January 7, 1966 (aged 73)
- Place of death: New York City, U.S.

Managerial career
- Years: Team
- –1925: Altoona Works
- 1926–1952: Penn State
- 1950: United States

William Jeffrey (August 3, 1892 – January 7, 1966) was the head coach of the United States national soccer team at the 1950 FIFA World Cup that famously beat England 1–0 in one of the greatest upsets in the history of soccer. He was the coach of Penn State for 26 seasons, winning ten national college championships. He is a member of the National Soccer Hall of Fame.

== Career ==
Born in Edinburgh, Scotland, Jeffrey began playing at an early age, but suffered a career-ending injury. His mother sent him to live with an uncle in the United States. He began working as a mechanic with the Altoona Railroad Shop of the Pennsylvania Railroad.

He eventually came to manage the company team. In 1925, his team played an exhibition game with Penn State University. This resulted in an offer to coach the men's soccer team, a position he held for 27 years. Beginning in 1932, the Nittany Lions would go on a 65-game unbeaten streak, a streak which ended in November 1941. A founding member of the NSCAA, he served as president of the association in 1948.

The United States Soccer Football Federation selected Jeffrey to coach the United States men's national soccer team at the 1950 FIFA World Cup just two weeks before the competition after Erno Schwarz declined the position. Jeffrey led the U.S. team to its historic 1–0 win over England in the 1950 World Cup, considered one of the greatest upsets in soccer history.

In 1953, he retired from Penn State. He moved to Puerto Rico where he taught and coached for several years. On September 29, 1972, the Penn State soccer stadium was named after Jeffrey. The NSCAA awards the annual Bill Jeffrey Award to college coaches.

=== Pennsylvania State University Coaching Legacy ===
100 Years, 4 Generations of Penn State Coaching History

Jeffrey, who started his coaching career in Altoona, Pennsylvania became the head coach of Penn State University Men's Soccer Team in the early 1920s, and later became the men's national team head coach in the FIFA World Cup. Coach Jeffrey died in 1966 and his coaching lineage worked through four generations at Pennsylvania State University. The captain of Jeffrey's 1950 U.S. team, Walter Bahr became coach at Penn State though the years of 1974-1988. His assistant, Barry Gorman, later succeeded him, keeping the Penn State job through the 2009 season. In 2021, the connection to Jeffrey continues with Coach Gorman’s youth player, Fraser Kershaw, who took the head coaching job at Penn State Altoona. The coaching connection reached four separate generations of soccer, reaching a 100-year continual coaching succession.

== Death ==
Jeffrey died of a heart attack while attending the NCAA soccer meetings in New York. He is buried in Centre County Memorial Cemetery in State College, Pennsylvania.
