= List of Eastern Illinois University alumni =

Following is a list of notable Eastern Illinois University alumni.

== Authors ==
- Glen Gabbard, psychiatrist and author of 20 books
- Jan Spivey Gilchrist, children's book author and illustrator
- Lee Martin, novelist

== Business ==
- Jimmy John Liautaud, Founder of Jimmy John's

== Education ==
- Christine Korsgaard, Professor of Philosophy Emerita at Harvard University

== Entertainment ==
- Joan Allen, actress
- Burl Ives, singer/actor who has the Burl Ives Studio on campus named after him (dropped out his junior year)
- Gary Forrester, writer and composer
- Mike Genovese, actor
- Rob Kleiner, songwriter and producer
- John Malkovich, actor
- Charlotte Martin, singer-songwriter
- LisaRaye McCoy, actress, notably from the sitcom All of Us
- William Edward Phipps, actor
- Matthew Polenzani, opera singer
- Craig Titley, American film writer
- Jerry Van Dyke, actor
- Ron Westray, jazz trombonist, member of the Lincoln Center Jazz Orchestra and the Mingus Big Band

== Politics ==
- Tim Butler, member of the Illinois House of Representatives
- Chuck Curran, member of the Ohio Senate from the 6th district from 1979 to 1982
- Jim Edgar, Governor of Illinois from 1991 to 1999
- Joe Knollenberg, representative of the Ninth District of Michigan, United States House of Representatives from 1993 to 2009
- Mary Miller, member of the United States House of Representatives
- Bill Mitchell, member of the Illinois House of Representatives
- Brandon Phelps, member of the Illinois House of Representatives
- Dennis Reboletti, member of Illinois House of Representatives
- Dale Righter, member of Illinois House of Representatives 1997–2003, Illinois State Senate 2003–2021
- Andy Skoog, member of the Illinois House of Representatives
- Larry Stuffle, member of the Illinois House of Representatives from 1977 to 1985. He was born in Charleston and represented the area in the Illinois House of Representatives.

== Science and medicine ==
- Ronald W. Davis, biochemist and genetics researcher at Stanford's Genome Technology Center, with patents on over 30 biochemical devices.
- Darrell L. Judge (1934–2014), physicist and Fellow of the American Physical Society

== Law enforcement ==
- Kimberly Cheatle, former Director of the United States Secret Service

== Sports ==
=== Baseball ===
- Tim Bogar, retired Major League Baseball infielder
- Zach Borenstein, professional baseball player
- Randy Myers, former American Major League Baseball pitcher with the New York Mets, Cincinnati Reds, San Diego Padres, Chicago Cubs, Baltimore Orioles and the Toronto Blue Jays between 1985 and 1998. 4x MLB All-Star.
- Marty Pattin, MLB All-Star pitcher
- Stan Royer, MLB baseball player for the St. Louis Cardinals and Boston Red Sox
- Kevin Seitzer, retired all-star Major League Baseball player

=== Basketball ===
- Henry Domercant, former professional basketball player in Europe
- Kevin Duckworth, former National Basketball Association all-star center
- Kyle Hill, former professional basketball player
- Dave Slifer, current head women's basketball coach for the Central Missouri Jennies basketball program
- Jay Taylor, former NBA player for the New Jersey Nets

=== Boxing ===
- James Warring, boxing world champion, kickboxing world champion, boxing referee

=== Football ===
- Brad Childress, former head coach of the Minnesota Vikings of the National Football League
- Ray Fisher, former lineman for Pittsburgh Steelers and Dallas Cowboys of the National Football League
- Jimmy Garoppolo, quarterback for Los Angeles Rams
- Kamu Grugier-Hill, NFL linebacker for the Minnesota Vikings
- Jeff Gossett, NFL Pro Bowl punter
- Mike Heimerdinger, former NFL Offensive coordinator with the New York Jets, Denver Broncos and Tennessee Titans, died 2011
- Alexander Hollins, wide receiver for the Minnesota Vikings
- Otis Hudson, NFL offensive lineman with the Cincinnati Bengals
- Dave Huxtable, analyst for the Texas Longhorns football team
- John Jurkovic, former NFL defensive lineman
- Tim Kelly offensive coordinator for the Houston Texans
- Ray McElroy, NFL defensive back for Chicago Bears, Indianapolis Colts and Detroit Lions
- Ryan Pace, former general manager of NFL's Chicago Bears
- Sean Payton, head coach of the Denver Broncos of the National Football League
- Ted Petersen, former lineman for Pittsburgh Steelers, Cleveland Browns and Indianapolis Colts of the National Football League
- Tony Romo, former quarterback of the Dallas Cowboys of the National Football League
- Mike Shanahan, former head coach of the Washington Redskins, Denver Broncos and Los Angeles Raiders of the National Football League
- Chris Szarka, fullback for the Saskatchewan Roughriders of the Canadian Football League
- Pierre Walters, linebacker, Kansas City Chiefs, of the National Football League
- Kirby Wilson, running backs coach for Las Vegas Raiders of the National Football League
- Chris Wilkerson, head coach of Eastern Illinois Panthers

Horse Racing

- Renowned Australian bookmaker and minor Castle Hill NSW personality Justin ‘Thommo’ Thompson.

=== MMA ===
- Brian Ebersole, Panther wrestler; professional MMA fighter formerly with the UFC
- Matt Hughes, NCAA All-American wrestler; retired professional MMA fighter, former 2-time UFC Welterweight Champion, UFC Hall of Fame member
- Kenny Robertson, four-time NCAA Division I qualifier for wrestling; professional mixed martial artist formerly with UFC and Bellator Fighting Championships
- Mike Russow, former wrestler; current mixed martial artist once for Pride Fighting Championships and the UFC
- Louis Taylor, wrestler; current professional MMA fighter
- Ryan Thomas, wrestler; current professional mixed martial arts fighter for American Top Team
- Matt Veach, current mixed martial artist, formerly for the UFC

=== Olympics ===
- John Craft, placed fifth in the Men's triple jump at the 1972 Summer Olympics
- Lauren Doyle, represented the United States of America for Rugby sevens at the 2016 Summer Olympics
- Tim Dykstra, former handball player who competed in the 1984 Summer Olympics.
- Sandy Osei-Agyemang, advanced to the second round in the Men's 100 metres and Men's 4 × 100 metres relay at the 1972 Summer Olympics
- Dan Steele, track All-American, 400-meter national champion, and bronze medalist at the 2002 Salt Lake City Olympics
- Darrin Steele, competed at the 1998 Winter Olympics and the 2002 Winter Olympics

=== Soccer ===
- John Baretta, former North American Soccer League goalkeeper
- Matt Bobo, former North American Soccer League player
- George Gorleku, former Major Indoor Soccer League (1978–92) player
- LeBaron Hollimon, former National Professional Soccer League (1984–2001) player
- Schellas Hyndman, former head coach of soccer's FC Dallas
- Damien Kelly, former National Professional Soccer League (1984–2001) player
- Mark Simpson, former goalkeeper and assistant coach for D.C. United
- Jason Thompson, former player for D.C. United
- Glen Tourville, former Major Indoor Soccer League (1978–92) player
