= Eastern Illinois Panthers =

Sports teams of a university or college

- University: Eastern Illinois University
- Nickname: Panthers
- NCAA: Division I (FCS)
- Conference: Ohio Valley Conference (primary); Summit League (swimming & diving)
- Athletic director: Tom Michael
- Location: Charleston, Illinois
- Varsity teams: 19 (9 men's, 10 women's)
- Football stadium: O’Brien Field
- Basketball arena: Groniger Arena
- Baseball stadium: Coaches Stadium at Monier Field
- Softball stadium: Williams Field
- Soccer field: Lakeside Soccer Field
- Natatorium: Padovan Pool
- Indoor track and field venue: Lantz Fieldhouse
- Outdoor track and field venue: O'Brien Field
- Volleyball arena: McAfee Gym
- Beach volleyball venue: Linder Sports Complex
- Colors: Blue and gray
- Mascot: Billy the Panther
- Marching band: Panther Marching Band
- Fight song: Eastern State March
- Website: eiupanthers.com/index.aspx

Team NCAA championships
- 5

Individual and relay NCAA champions
- 30

The Eastern Illinois Panthers are the intercollegiate athletic programs of Eastern Illinois University (EIU) located in Charleston, Illinois, United States. The Panthers athletic program competes at the NCAA Division I level and is a member of the Ohio Valley Conference (OVC). The football team is a member of the Division I FCS (formerly known as Division I-AA). EIU's colors are blue and gray. Selected as the team mascot in 1930, EIU's panther was informally known as "Billy" for many years and was officially named "Billy the Panther" in 2008. Panther teams have won five NCAA national championships in three sports. The Panthers also won the 1969 NAIA men's soccer title.

== History ==
Eastern Illinois athletics began in the school's very first year, with the inaugural football team taking the field only three weeks after the first students arrived on campus in 1899.

Eastern Illinois was a member of the Interstate Intercollegiate Athletic Conference from 1912 to 1970. From 1978 to 1982 they were members of the Mid-Continent Athletic Association which was absorbed by the Association of Mid-Continent Universities later known as the Mid-Continent Conference now the Summit League till 1996. In 1996 they joined the Ohio Valley Conference which is their current conference.

A member of the Ohio Valley Conference since 1996, Eastern Illinois University sponsors teams in nine men's and ten women's NCAA sanctioned sports. The Panthers' men's and women's swimming teams compete as associate members of the Summit League since those sports are not sponsored by the OVC. The men's soccer team also competed in the Summit League before the OVC launched a men's soccer league for the 2023 season (2023–24 school year).

== Sports sponsored ==
Men's sports	Women's sports
Baseball	Basketball
Basketball	Beach volleyball
Cross country	Cross Country
Football	Golf
Golf	Soccer
Soccer	Softball
Swimming and diving	Swimming and diving
Track and field^{†}	Track and field^{†}
	Volleyball
† – Track and field includes both indoor and outdoor

=== Baseball ===
Ohio Valley Conference logo in Eastern Illinois colors

- 1973 NCAA Division II World Series Third Place.
- 1978 NCAA Division II World Series Fifth Place.
- 1981 NCAA Division II World Series Runner-Up.

The Panther baseball team has appeared in three NCAA Division I Baseball Championship, in 1999, 2008, and 2023.

=== Basketball ===
==== Men's basketball ====
- NAIA tournament appearances (6) 1947, 1949, 1950, 1952, 1953, 1957. With a combined record of 7–7. Highest finish, 4th: 1957.
- NCAA Division II tournament appearances each year from 1975 to 1980. Highest finish, 3rd: 1976 and 1978.
- NCAA Division I tournament appearances (1992 and 2001).
- All time tournament results

Year	Seed	First Round Winner		First Round Loser	
1992	15	Indiana	94	Eastern Illinois	55
2001	15	Arizona	101	Eastern Illinois	76

==== Women’s basketball ====
- NCAA Division I tournament appearance 1988.

Year	Seed	First Round Winner		First Round Loser	
1988	10	Colorado	78	Eastern Illinois	72

=== Men's cross country ===
Team Championships:

- 1968 – NCAA College Division National Champions
- 1969 – NCAA College Division National Champions
- 1977 – NCAA Division II National Champions

National Finishes:

- 1971 – NCAA Division II Fifth Place
- 1972 – NCAA Division II Seventh Place
- 1973 – NCAA Division II Third Place
- 1974 – NCAA Division II Third Place
- 1975 – NCAA Division II Third Place
- 1976 – NCAA Division II Third Place
- 1978 – NCAA Division II Fifth Place
- 1979 – NCAA Division II Third Place

=== Football ===
- 1978 Division II National Champion
- 1980 Division II National Runner-Up.
- NCAA Division I Football Championship tournament appearances: 1982, 1983, 1986, 1989, 1995, 1996, 2000, 2001, 2002, 2005, 2006, 2007, 2009, 2012, 2013, 2015.
- Conference Titles: 1912, 1913, 1914, 1928, 1948, 1980, 1981, 1982, 1983, 1984, 1986, 1995, 2001, 2002, 2005, 2006, 2009, 2012, 2013
- All time tournament results

Year	First Round Home team		First Round Away team		Second Round Home		Second Round Away		Quarterfinal Home		Quarterfinal Away	
1982 ^{OT}	Eastern Illinois	16	Jackson Tigers	13					Tennessee State	20	Eastern Illinois	19
1983 ^{2OT}	Indiana State	16	Eastern Illinois	13								
1986	Eastern Illinois	28	Murray State	21					Eastern Illinois	22	Eastern Kentucky	24
1989	Idaho	21	Eastern Illinois	38					Montana	25	Eastern Illinois	19
1995	Stephen F. Austin	34	Eastern Illinois	29								
1996	Northern Iowa	21	Eastern Illinois	14								
2000	Montana	45	Eastern Illinois	13								
2001	Eastern Illinois	43	Northern Iowa	49								
2002	Western Illinois	48	Eastern Illinois	9								
2005	Eastern Illinois	6	Southern Illinois	21								
2006	Eastern Illinois	13	Illinois State	24								
2007	Southern Illinois	30	Eastern Illinois	11								
2009	Southern Illinois	48	Eastern Illinois	7								
2012	South Dakota State	58	Eastern Illinois	10								
2013	Bye		Bye		Eastern Illinois	51	Tennessee State	10	Eastern Illinois	39	Towson	49
2015	Northern Iowa	53	Eastern Illinois	17								

=== Men’s golf ===
National Finishes:

- 1969 - NAIA 4th Place
- 1972 - NAIA 8th Place

Individual National Champions:

- 1972 - Gaylord Burrows - NAIA

=== Soccer ===
==== Men's soccer ====
- 1969 – NAIA National Champion.
- NCAA Division II runners-up in 1979, 3rd in 1978, and 4th in 1974.
- Stripped of 1981 Division I 3rd-place finish.

==== Women’s soccer ====
The Panther women’s soccer team has appeared in four NCAA Division I Women's Soccer tournaments in 2001, 2002, 2003, and 2004.

=== Softball ===
The Panther softball team appeared in two AIAW Women's College World Series, in 1971 and 1974. They reached their first NCAA Division I softball tournament in 2023.

=== Men’s swimming and diving ===
National Finishes:

- 1975 - NCAA Division II 3rd Place

Individual National Champions:

- 1973 - Bob Thomas, NCAA Division II 200 yard backstroke
- 1973 - Bob Thomas, NCAA Division II 400 yard IM
- 1973 - Jon Mayfield, NCAA Division II 200 yard breaststroke
- 1973 - NCAA Division II 400 yard medley (Bob Thomas, Jon Mayfield, Dan Cole, Dave Toler)
- 1974 - Bob Thomas, NCAA Division II 200 yard backstroke
- 1974 - Bob Thomas, NCAA Division II 400 yard IM
- 1974 - Jon Mayfield, NCAA Division II 200 yard breaststroke
- 1974 - NCAA Division II 400 yard medley (Bob Thomas, Jon Mayfield, Brian Forsberg, Dave Toler)
- 1975 - Jon Mayfield, NCAA Division II 200 yard breaststroke

=== Track and field ===
Team Championships (men's):

- 1974 – NCAA Division II Outdoor National Champions
- 1976 — NCAA Division II Outdoor National Runner-up

Individual Champions:

- 1955 – Ray White, NAIA Long Jump
- 1967 – John Craft, NAIA Triple Jump
- 1969 – John Craft, NCAA College Division Triple Jump
- 1972 – Rodney Jackson, NCAA College Division 400 hurdles
- 1973 – Rodney Jackson, NCAA College Division 400 hurdles
- 1974 – Darrell Brown, NCAA Division II Long Jump
- 1975 – Toni Ababio, NCAA Division II Long Jump
- 1975 – Toni Ababio, NCAA Division II Triple Jump
- 1976 – Ed Hatch, NCAA Division II 400 Meter Dash
- 1979 – Robert Johnson, NCAA Division II 110 hurdles
- 1981 — 4x400 Relay, Women’s Track & Field AIAW II
- 1981 – Augustine Oruwari, NCAA Division II 110 hurdles
- 1988 – Jim Maton, NCAA Division I 800 meter run (Indoor)
- 1992 – Dan Steele, NCAA Division I 400 hurdles

=== Volleyball ===
The Eastern Illinois volleyball team has been the Ohio Valley Conference champions in 1998, co champions in 2004, 2023, and 2025. The volleyball team has made three NCAA Division I women's volleyball tournament appearances in 2001, 2023, and 2025.

== Athletic facilities ==
=== Current facilities ===
Facilities are housed on the west side of the EIU campus between 4th Street and Grant Avenue.

- Coaches Stadium at Monier Field — Baseball
- Lakeside Field — Men's and women's soccer
- Lantz Arena — Men's and women's basketball
- Lantz Field House — Men's and women's indoor track and field
- Linder Sports Complex — Beach volleyball
- McAfee Gym — Volleyball
- O’Brien Field — Football, men's and women's outdoor track and field
- Ray Padovan Pool — Men's and women's swimming and diving
- Tom Woodall Panther Trail — Men's and women's cross country
- Williams Field — Softball

Men's and women's golf practice at four local courses including Charleston Country Club, Mattoon Country Club, Meadowview Golf Course and Bent Tree Golf Course.

=== Former facilities ===
- Lakeside Rugby Field — Women’s Rugby (1999-2014)
- Pemberton Hall — Men’s Basketball
- McAfee Gymnasium — Men’s Basketball
- Rex Darling Tennis Courts — Men’s and Women’s Tennis (1931-2025)
- Schahrer Field — Football (1899–1948)

=== Club and intramural facilities ===
- Student Rec Center — Intramural sports

== Notable former athletes ==
=== Baseball ===
- Tim Bogar, retired Major League Baseball infielder
- Zach Borenstein (born 1990), baseball outfielder
- Randy Myers, former American Major League Baseball pitcher with the New York Mets, Cincinnati Reds, San Diego Padres, Chicago Cubs, Baltimore Orioles and the Toronto Blue Jays between 1985 and 1998. 4x MLB All-Star.
- Marty Pattin, former MLB baseball pitcher for the California Angels, Seattle Pilots, Milwaukee Brewers, Boston Red Sox, and Kansas City Royals
- Stan Royer, MLB baseball player for the St. Louis Cardinals and Boston Red Sox
- Kevin Seitzer, retired all-star Major League Baseball player

=== Basketball ===
- Henry Domercant, former professional basketball player in Europe
- Kevin Duckworth, former NBA All-Star forward
- Kyle Hill, former professional basketball player in Europe
- Jay Taylor, former NBA player for the New Jersey Nets

=== Football ===
- Brad Childress, former head coach of the Minnesota Vikings
- Jimmy Garoppolo, quarterback for the Las Vegas Raiders
- Jeff Gossett, former NFL punter for the LA/Oakland Raiders and 3 other NFL teams
- Kamu Grugier-Hill, linebacker for the Miami Dolphins
- Alexander Hollins, wide receiver for the Minnesota Vikings
- John Jurkovic, former NFL Defensive tackle for the Green Bay Packers and Jacksonville Jaguars
- Tim Kelly offensive coordinator for the Houston Texans
- Ray McElroy, former NFL Cornerback for the Indianapolis Colts and Chicago Bears
- Sean Payton, head coach of the Denver Broncos and winner of Super Bowl XLIV
- Ted Petersen, retired NFL Offensive/Defensive tackle for the Pittsburgh Steelers, Cleveland Browns, and Indianapolis Colts
- Tony Romo, former quarterback for the Dallas Cowboys and now a sportscaster
- Micah Rucker, former wide receiver for the Pittsburgh Steelers, Kansas City Chiefs, and New York Giants; also played in the Arena Football League
- Mike Shanahan, former head coach of the Los Angeles Raiders, Denver Broncos and Washington Redskins and 3 times Super Bowl winner.
- Chris Szarka, retired Canadian Football League fullback
- Pierre Walters, former NFL linebacker for the Kansas City Chiefs

=== Handball ===
- Tim Dykstra, former handball player who competed in the 1984 Summer Olympics.

=== MMA ===
- Matt Hughes, 2x NCAA All-American wrestler, former UFC Welterweight Champion
- Kenny Robertson, 4x NCAA Division I qualifier for wrestling; current mixed martial artist for the UFC
- Mike Russow, current mixed martial artist
- Matt Veach, current mixed martial artist

=== Rugby ===
- Lauren Doyle, represented the United States of America for Rugby sevens at the 2016 Summer Olympics

=== Soccer ===
- Schellas Hyndman, former head coach of soccer's FC Dallas
- Matt Bobo, former North American Soccer League player
- John Baretta, former North American Soccer League goalkeeper
- George Gorleku, former Major Indoor Soccer League (1978–92) player
- LeBaron Hollimon, former National Professional Soccer League (1984–2001) player
- Damien Kelly, former National Professional Soccer League (1984–2001) player
- Mark Simpson, former goalkeeper and assistant coach for D.C. United
- Jason Thompson, former player for D.C. United
- Glen Tourville, former Major Indoor Soccer League (1978–92) player

=== Track ===
- John Craft, placed 5th in the Men’s triple jump at the 1972 Summer Olympics
- Sandy Osei-Agyemang, advanced to the second round in the Men's 100 metres and Men's 4 × 100 metres relay at the 1972 Summer Olympics
- Dan Steele, track All-American, 400-meter National Champion, and Bronze Medalist at the 2002 Winter Olympics
- Darrin Steele, competed at the 1998 Winter Olympics and the 2002 Winter Olympics
