= FIU Panthers =

Florida International University sports teams

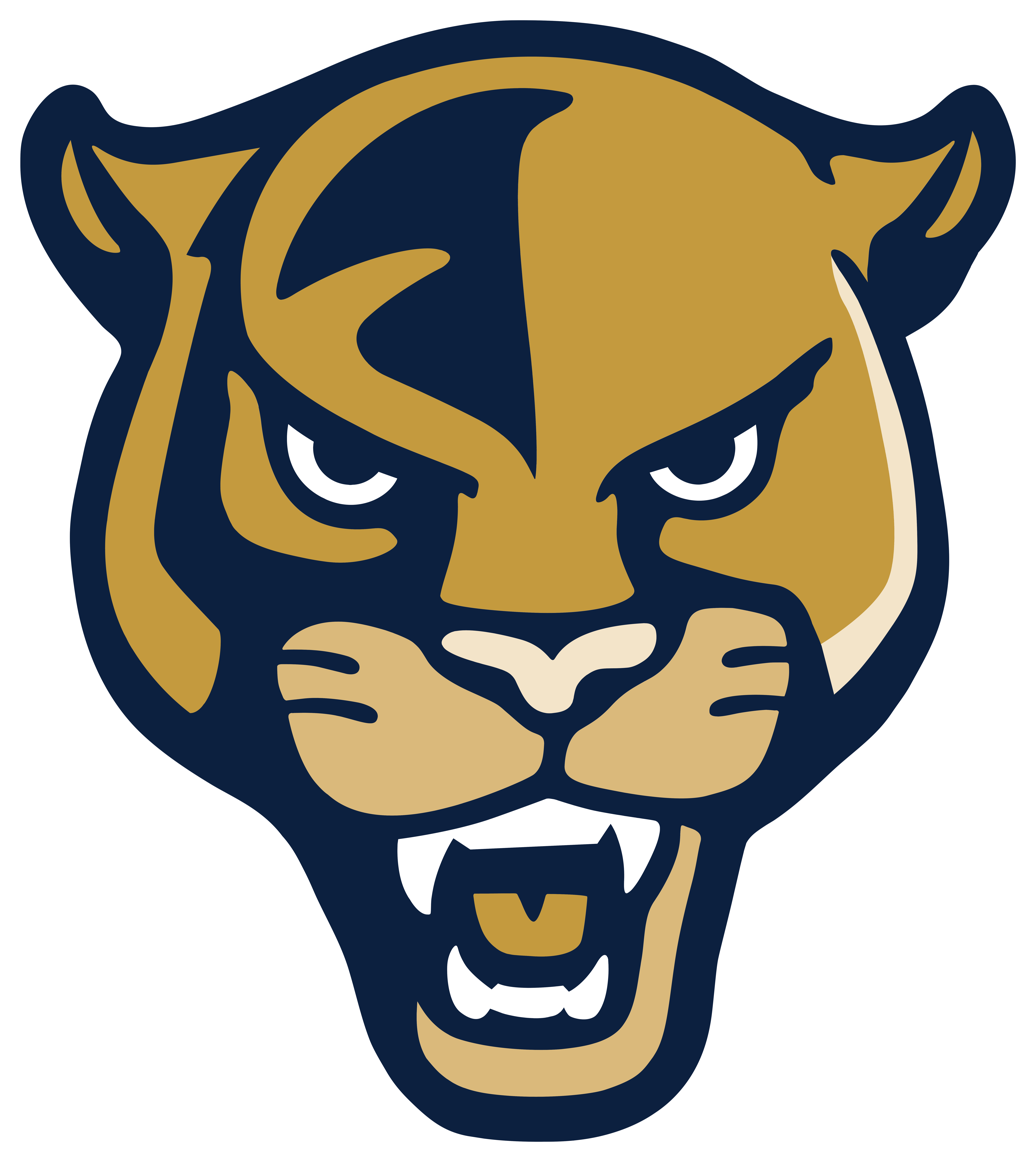
- University: Florida International University
- Nickname: Panthers
- NCAA: Division I (FBS)
- Conference: CUSA (primary); The American (men's soccer, swimming & diving)
- Athletic director: Scott Carr
- Location: Miami, Florida
- Varsity teams: 18 (7 men's, 11 women's)
- Football stadium: Pitbull Stadium
- Basketball arena: Ocean Bank Convocation Center
- Baseball stadium: FIU Baseball Stadium
- Softball stadium: Felsberg Field at FIU Softball Stadium
- Soccer stadium: FIU Soccer Stadium
- Tennis venue: FIU Tennis Courts
- Colors: Blue and gold
- Mascot: Roary the Panther
- Fight song: FIU Fight Song
- Website: fiusports.com

The FIU Panthers are the athletic teams representing Florida International University, an American public university located in Miami, Florida. The Panthers currently compete in National Collegiate Athletic Association (NCAA) Division I athletics as members of Conference USA. The men's soccer and swimming & diving teams compete in the American Athletic Conference. Until 2011, they were known as the FIU Golden Panthers.

== History and introduction ==
FIU's colors are navy blue and gold, and their mascot is the Panther (taken from the Florida panther, an endangered species endemic to the nearby Everglades), which is embodied by a panther named Roary the Panther. The school's original nickname was the "Sunblazers", but it was changed in 1987 to the "Golden Panthers", with the word "Golden" officially dropped beginning with the 2010–11 school year.

Conference USA logo in FIU's colors

FIU is a member of the NCAA, participating in Division I, and is a member of Conference USA. FIU joined the Sun Belt Conference in 1998 having previously competed in the Trans America Athletic Conference (TAAC; now the Atlantic Sun Conference), from 1991 to 1998. They joined Conference USA in 2013.

The FIU Athletic Department has produced scores of professional and Olympic athletes, including current players in Major League Baseball, Major League Soccer, the National Basketball Association, the National Football League, and in the Women's National Basketball Association.

FIU's current athletic director is Scott Carr, who was hired on November 30, 2021. He most recently worked as deputy AD with the UCF Knights, and also previously worked in executive athletic roles with the Auburn Tigers and Southern Miss Golden Eagles.

=== Conference affiliations ===
Division	Years	Conference affiliation
NCAA Division II	1965–66 to 1987–88	Independent
NCAA Division I	1988–89 to 1990–91	Independent
NCAA Division I	1991–92 to 1997–98	Trans America Athletic Conference (now Atlantic Sun Conference)
NCAA Division I	1998–99 to 2012–13	Sun Belt Conference
NCAA Division I	2013–14 to present	Conference USA (East)

== Sports sponsored ==
Men's sports	Women's sports
Baseball	Basketball
Basketball	Beach volleyball
Cross country	Cross country
Football	Golf
Soccer	Soccer
Track and field^{†}	Softball
	Swimming and diving
	Tennis
	Track and field^{1}
	Volleyball
^{1} – includes both indoor and outdoor

=== Baseball ===
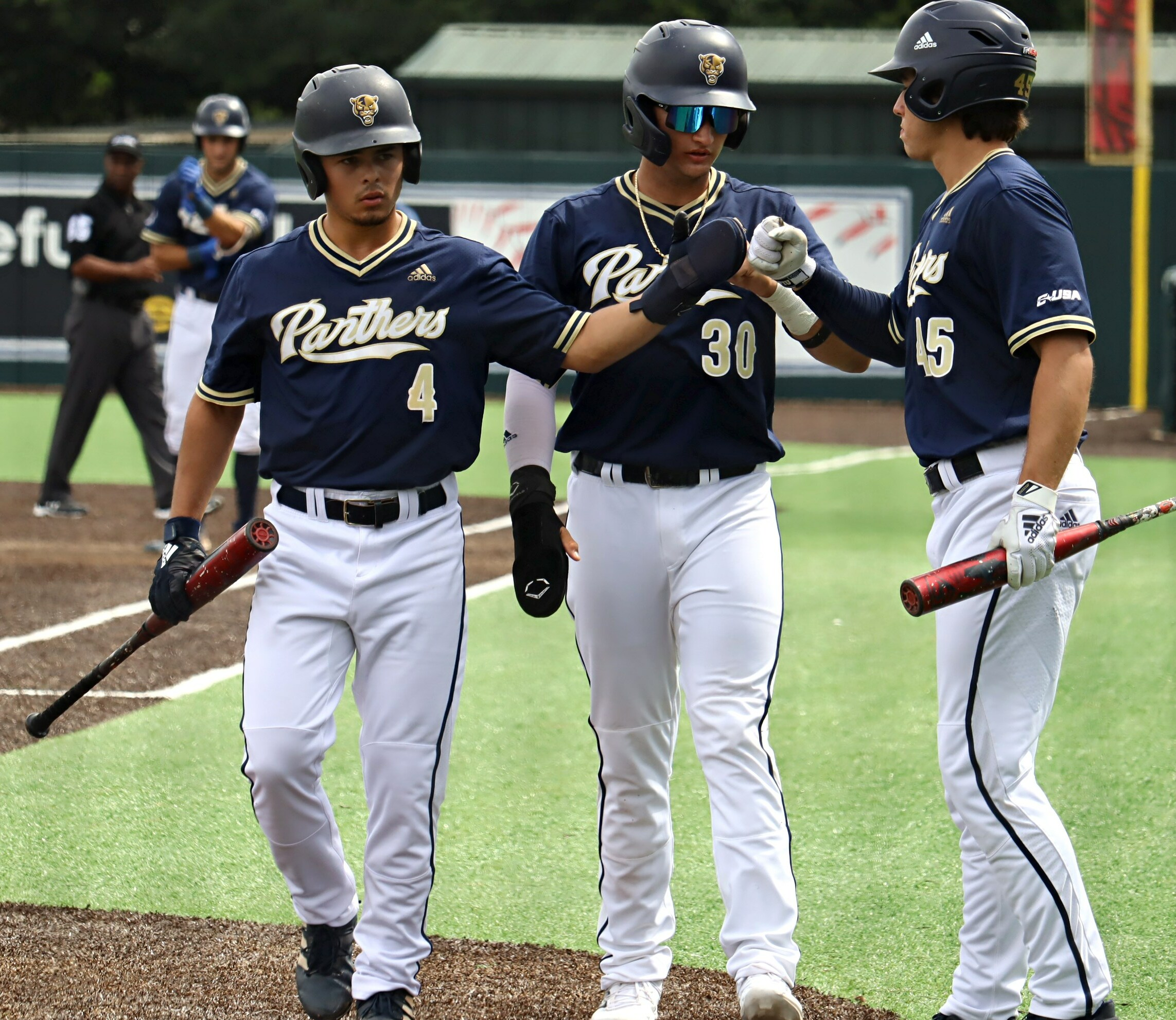
Panthers baseball players during the 2023 season

FIU's baseball team began play in 1973 as a Division II member and is one of the most successful programs in the school's history. The team has reached the post-season 14 times in school history, including nine times as a Division I program. The other five appearances came as a Division II program and included a Division II College World Series appearance.

Many players from past years have been drafted by Major League Baseball teams and have played in the majors. FIU's most notable baseball alumni is Mike Lowell, former third baseman of the New York Yankees, Florida Marlins, and Boston Red Sox. Lowell was the 2007 World Series MVP. Garrett Wittels finished the 2010 season with a 56-game hitting streak, two hits shy of the Division I record, set the FIU season record for hits, was nominated for the Best Male College Athlete ESPY Award for his 2010 performance, won Sun Belt Conference Player of the Year honors, and was named a NCBWA and Louisville Slugger/TPX Preseason All-American.

Team honors

- NCAA Division I Super Regional Appearances (1): 2001
- NCAA Division I Regional Appearances (11): 1991, 1995, 1997, 1998, 1999, 2000, 2001, 2002, 2010, 2011, 2015
- NCAA Division II College World Series (1): 1980
- NCAA Division II Regional Appearances (5): 1976, 1978, 1979, 1980, 1982
- Conference USA tournament Champions (1): 2015
- Sun Belt Conference tournament champions (2): 1999, 2010
- Trans America Athletic Conference tournament champions (2): 1991, 1998

=== Men's basketball ===
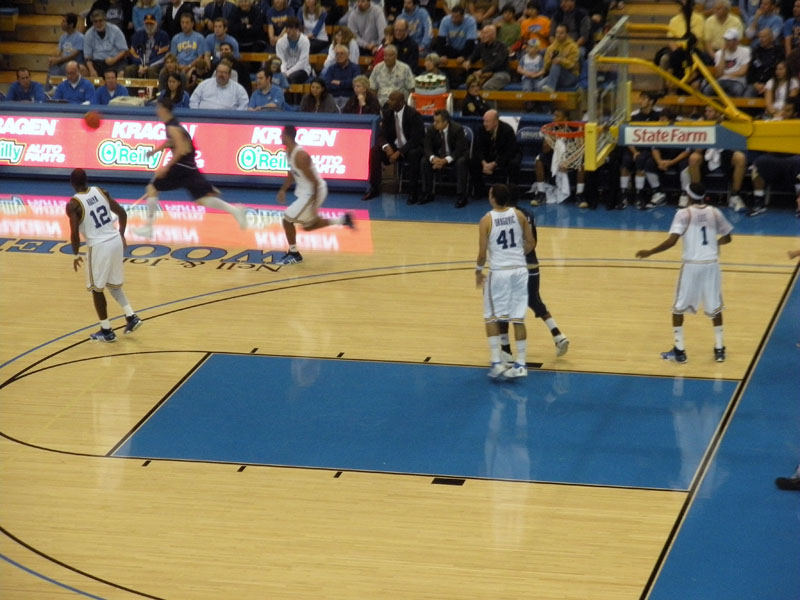
FIU at UCLA Pauley Pavilion, 2008

The current head coach of the FIU men's basketball team is Joey Cantens, who was hired after the conclusion of the 2025-26 season.

FIU men's basketball team had its lone NCAA tournament appearance in the 1995 tournament under then Head Coach Bob Weltlich. FIU won the TAAC Basketball Tournament and in doing so earned an automatic bid for the NCAA tournament. FIU was seeded #16 and played the #1 seeded UCLA Bruins in the first round of the West Regional, which was played at the Taco Bell Arena in Boise, Idaho. The Panthers lost the game to the Bruins by the score of 92–56, being the first tournament win in UCLA's successful run to the National Championship that year.

FIU alumni who have played in the National Basketball Association include Carlos Arroyo and Raja Bell.

Team honors

- NCAA tournament Appearances (1): 1995
- Trans America Athletic Conference tournament champions (1): 1995
- Trans America Athletic Conference regular season champions (1): 1992–93

=== Women's basketball ===
The women's basketball team plays their home games on-campus at the Ocean Bank Convocation Center. The current head coach is Jesyka Burks-Wiley, who won the Coach of the Year honor in Conference USA in the 2020–21 season.

Team honors

- NCAA Division I tournament Appearances (6): 1994, 1995, 1997, 1998, 1999, 2002
- WNIT Appearances (7): 1992, 1993, 2001, 2003, 2006, 2012, 2013
- NCAA Division II tournament Appearances (3): 1983, 1986, 1987
- Sun Belt Conference tournament champions (1): 2002
- Sun Belt Conference regular season champions (1): 2001–02
- Trans America Athletic Conference tournament champions (6): 1992, 1993, 1994, 1995, 1997, 1998
- Trans America Athletic Conference regular season champions (7): 1991–92, 1992–93, 1993–94, 1994–95, 1995–96, 1996–97, 1997–98
- New South Women's Athletic Conference regular season champions (2): 1988–89, 1989–90

=== Cross country ===
Men's team honors

- Trans America Athletic Conference Champions (4): 1991, 1992, 1993, 1994

Women's team honors

- Trans America Athletic Conference Champions (5): 1991, 1992, 1993, 1994, 1997
- New South Women's Athletic Conference Champions (2): 1988, 1990

Men's individual honors

- NCAA Division I South All-Region (2): Gabriel Rodriguez, 1998, 1999

Women's individual honors

- NCAA Division I South All-Region (1): Ingrid Odermatt, 1997

=== Football ===
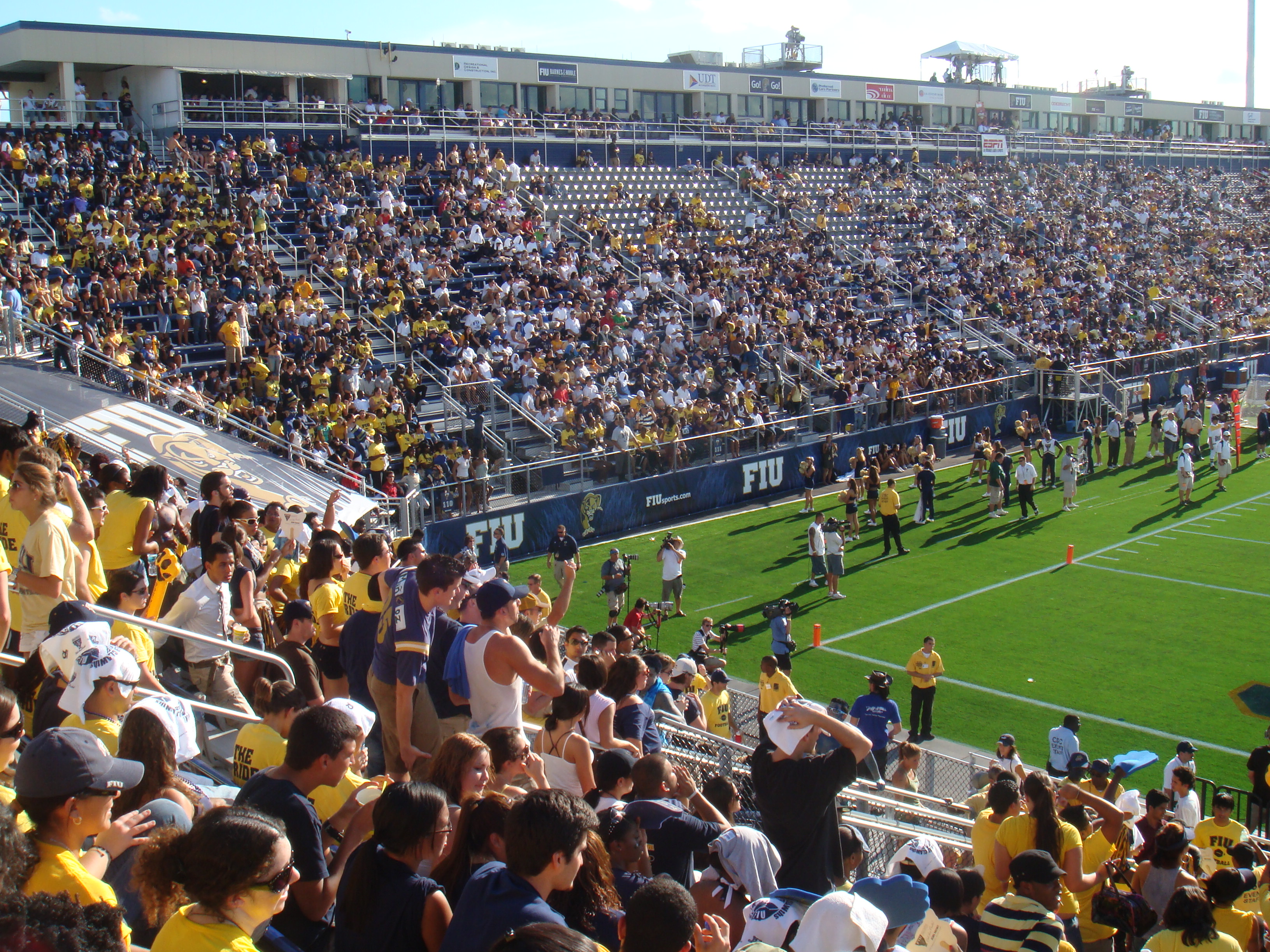
The Panthers play at the on-campus Pitbull Stadium.

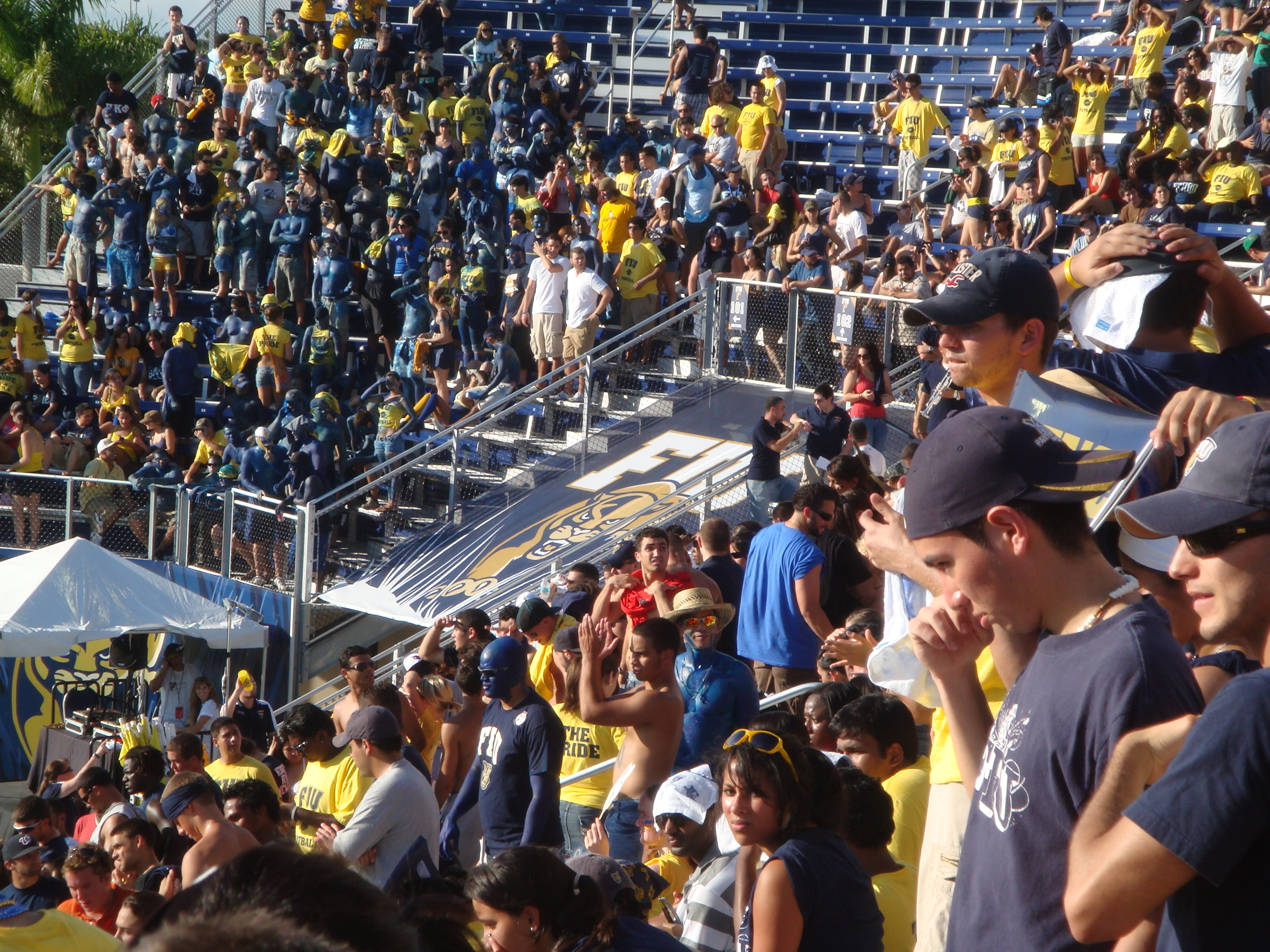
FIU fans at a football game at Riccardo Silva Stadium.

The FIU Panthers football team competes in the NCAA FBS Football Bowl Subdivision (formerly known as Division I-A), the highest level in intercollegiate football, and is a member of Conference USA. They are led by head coach Willie Simmons and play at Pitbull Stadium on FIU's Westchester campus. The team began playing in 2002 as a member of NCAA Division I-AA, now known as the NCAA FCS Football Championship Subdivision. Three years later, the FIU Athletics Department decided to move the program up to Division I-A. FIU became the fastest school to make such a move from a program's inception.

On August 29, 2002, the program played its first game at home against Saint Peter's College in front of a sold-out crowd of 17,314. FIU defeated St. Peter's by the score of 27–3.

The FIU football team's main rivals are the Florida Atlantic Owls and the University of Miami Hurricanes. Both FIU and Florida Atlantic play annually in a game known as the Shula Bowl. The game is named after former Miami Dolphins head coach and Football Hall of Fame inductee Don Shula. The Panthers and Hurricanes last played on November 23, 2019, at LoanDepot Park, with FIU defeating UM 30–24.

Team honors

- Sun Belt Conference Champions (1): 2010
- Bowl appearances (5): 2010, 2011, 2017, 2018, 2019

=== Men's soccer ===
FIU has won two NCAA Division II national championships in men's soccer. In 1982, FIU beat Southern Connecticut State by the score of 2–1, to win the school's first national title in any sport. Two years later the Panthers won their second national title beating Seattle Pacific University 1–0. To date these are the only national titles the university has achieved in athletic competition.

The men's soccer team competes in The American. The team previously played in the Atlantic Soccer Conference from 2000 to 2004 and the Trans America Athletic Conference (now known as the Atlantic Sun Conference) from 1991 to 1999.

FIU has regularly qualified for the NCAA tournament in men's soccer, both as Division I and Division II program. In addition to the national championships achieved by the team as a Division II program, the team reached the Division I championship game in 1996, losing to St. John's University 4–1.

Recently, two new soccer fields were finished in the summer of 2007 on the northwest side of campus. These fields will complement the other two, making four soccer fields for use by both the men and women's soccer teams, as well as practice fields for the football team.

Team honors

- Division I national runner-up (1): 1996
- NCAA Division I tournament Appearances (8): 1991, 1994, 1996, 1997, 2001, 2002, 2003, 2004, 2015
- Division II National Champions (2): 1982, 1984
- Division II national runner-up (2): 1980, 1985
- NCAA Division II tournament Appearances (8): 1977, 1978, 1979, 1980, 1982, 1983, 1984, 1985
- Conference – USA Champions (1): 2015
- Atlantic Soccer Conference Champions (4): 2000, 2002, 2003, 2004
- Trans America Athletic Conference Champions (1): 1991

=== Women's soccer ===
The women's soccer team competes in Conference USA after previously being unaffiliated from 1985 to 1999 and a member of the Sun Belt Conference from 2000 through 2012.

Team honors

- NCAA tournament Appearances (3): 1993, 2011, 2024
- Conference USA Tournament Champions (1): 2024
- Conference USA Regular-Season Champions (1): 2024
- Sun Belt Conference Tournament Champions (2): 2000, 2011
  Sun Belt Conference Regular-Season Champions (2): 2000, 2009, 2012
- TAAC Regular-Season Co-Champions (1): 1993

=== Softball ===
FIU's softball team competes in Conference USA after previously being a member of the Atlantic Sun Conference in 1998, Independent from 1999 to 2000, and of the Sun Belt Conference from 2001 through 2012. The team plays its home games at Felsberg Field at FIU Softball Stadium.

Team honors

- NCAA tournament Appearances (3): 2003, 2010, 2017

=== Swimming and diving ===
FIU's Swimming & Diving team competes in Conference USA after previously being a member of the Sun Belt Conference from 2003–2004 through 2012–2013.

Team honors

- Conference – USA Conference Champions (6): 2014–15, 2015–16, 2016–17, 2017–18, 2018–19, 2019–20

=== Track & Field ===
FIU's Track & Field teams compete in Conference USA after previously being a member of the Atlantic Sun Conference in 1998.

Individual honors

- NCAA D1 Individual National Champion - Sheri-Ann Brooks (2005 Women's Outdoor 200m Dash)
- FIU has had four Olympians, including three-time Olympic hurdler Ronald Forbes (Cayman Islands), Aubrey Smith (Canada), 2004 Gold Medalist Tayna Lawrence (Jamaica) and Ena Guevara-Mora (Peru).

=== Volleyball ===
FIU's indoor and beach volleyball teams both play in or at the site of the indoor arena, with the indoor program coached by Flavia Siqueira and the beach team coached by Lauren DeTurk. The indoor volleyball program was established in 1974, while in 2013 the beach volleyball team became the newest sport at FIU. The indoor squad plays their matches at the Ocean Bank Convocation Center and the beach squad plays primarily on sand courts right by the arena.

Volleyball team honors

- NCAA tournament Appearances (3): 2001, 2008, 2009
- Sun Belt Conference tournament champions(1): 2001
- Sun Belt Conference regular season champions (3): 2006, 2008, 2009
- New South Women's Athletic Conference tournament champions (1): 1990

Sand volleyball team honors

- AVCA national championships Appearances (2): 2014, 2015

== Notable non-varsity sports ==
=== Rugby ===
Founded in 1989, FIU Rugby competes in the South Independent Rugby Conference against in-state Florida rivals such as USF and UCF. FIU Rugby has improved since hiring Head Coach Ronny Suarez in late spring 2015, defeating two-time D1-AA national champions Central Florida in October 2015.

=== Esports ===
Since the founding of the FIU Esports Department in the fall of 2022 several non-varsity teams have accomplished notable wins in their respective tournaments and conferences. The FIU Marvel Rivals team were the winners of the ECAC Collegiate Open in spring of 2025, going 3-1 against Ohio State. FIU's League of Legends team won the NACE Club Championship of fall 2025 with a 2-1 win versus Baylor University. The FIU Mario Kart team has won two national championships in the ECAC partnered Collegiate Karting League, one in spring of 2025 for Mario Kart 8 Deluxe and another for the game Mario Kart World as a merged team with Miami Dade and Warner University in fall of 2025.

== Facilities ==
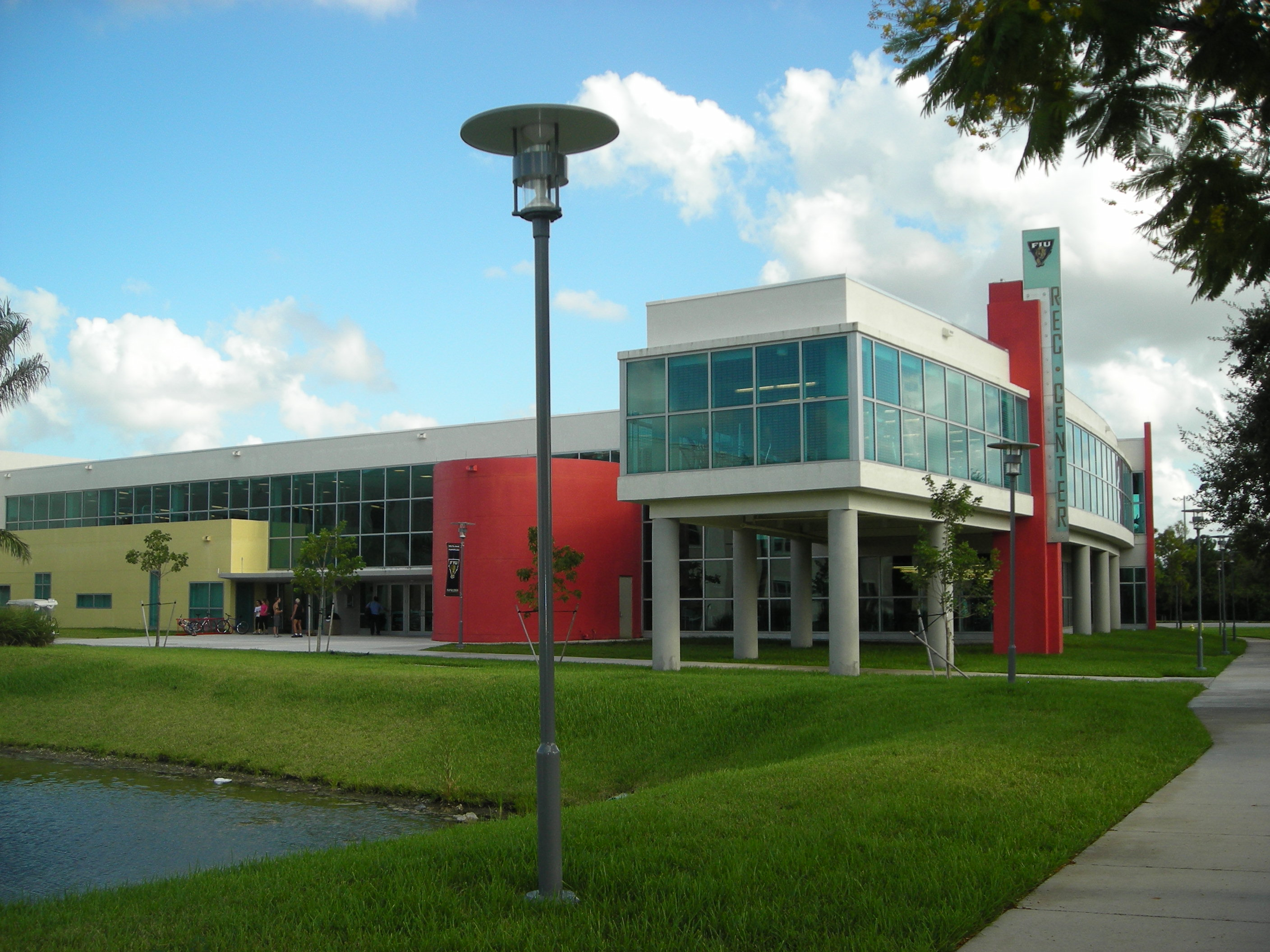
FIU Recreation Center

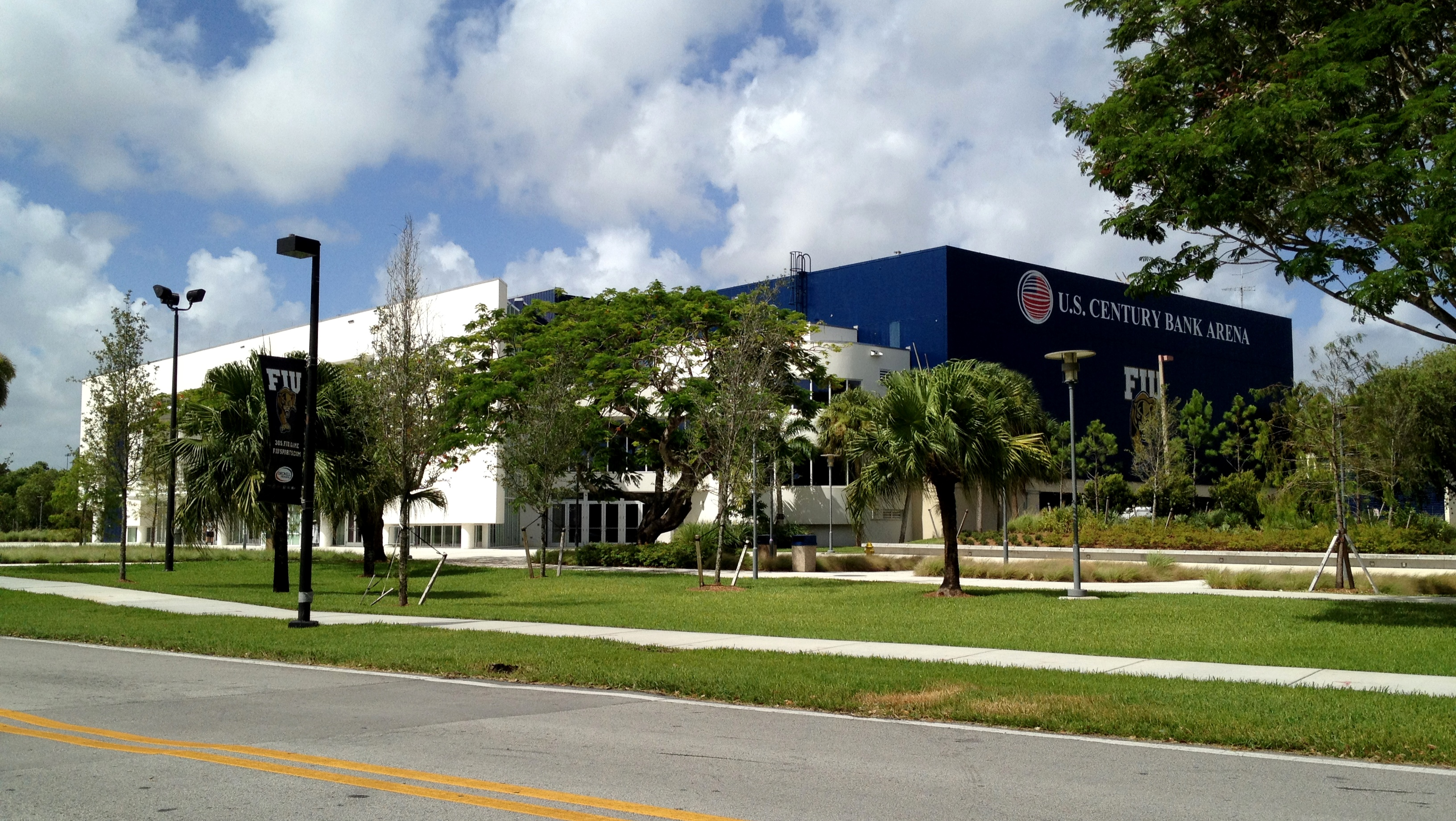
Ocean Bank Convocation Center, home of the Panther volleyball and basketball teams

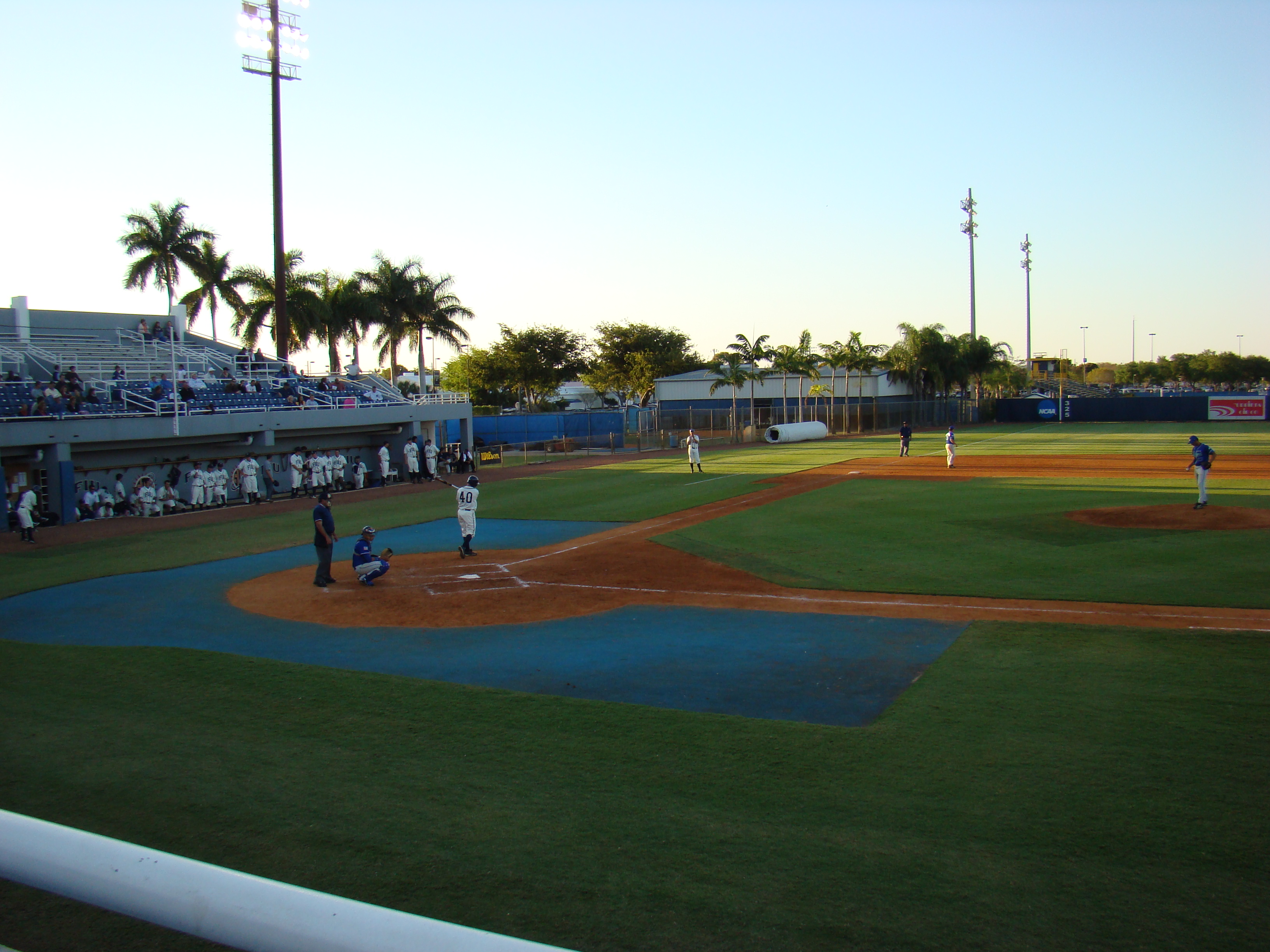
Mike Martinez batting for the Panthers at FIU Baseball Stadium, home of the Panther baseball team

=== Pitbull Stadium ===
Pitbull Stadium was originally opened in 1995 as a standard track and field athletics stadium, with mobile seats for the football end zones and an artificial turf infield. In 2007, the stadium was closed and converted into a dedicated football stadium, with the track removed, the original turf replaced with FieldTurf, and permanent stands providing 20,000 seats. It was re-opened in time for the 2008 college football season. Further improvements to FIU Stadium are ongoing, with a future capacity target of 45,000 seats.

During Pitbull Stadium's reconstruction, the Panthers football team played at the Miami Orange Bowl in the 2007 season, and actually won the final college football game played at the stadium before it was demolished to make way for the new Marlins Park.

=== Ocean Bank Convocation Center ===
Ocean Bank Convocation Center (previously known as Sunblazer Arena, Golden Panther Arena, Pharmed Arena, U.S. Century Bank Arena, and FIU Arena), is a 6,000-seat multi-purpose arena that opened on February 1, 1986. The FIU Panthers' basketball and volleyball teams play there. It was originally named Sunblazer Arena but was renamed Golden Panther Arena when FIU's athletic teams changed their nickname from Sunblazers to Golden Panthers in 1987. It was eventually renamed on September 1, 2004, in honor of Pharmed Group after a US$1 million donation was made to the FIU athletic department by Pharmed owners Jorge and Carlos de Cespedes. After Pharmed was liquidated in 2008 the arena name was briefly changed to FIU Arena. Later in 2008, the name was changed to U.S. Century Bank Arena when the local bank of that name acquired naming rights. The name reverted to the FIU Arena name in 2014, but was renamed the Ocean Bank Convocation Center in January 2018.

Other events such as MTV's Campus Invasion, the Miss Universe Contest, National Political Rallys, music concerts, ceremonies and fairs are also held year-round at the arena.

=== FIU Baseball Stadium ===
FIU Baseball Stadium is a baseball stadium located in the Modesto A. Maidique Campus of Florida International University in Westchester, Florida. It is used as the home venue of the university's baseball team. The facility opened on January 26, 1996, with an FIU victory against Bethune–Cookman, 1–0. The baseball team played its 2000 season at the Homestead Sports Complex in Homestead, Florida while the facility underwent an expansion.

In 2005, the facility also hosted the Sun Belt Conference Baseball Tournament.
