= Alabama A&M Bulldogs soccer =

- Founded: 1977
- Folded: November 2011; 14 years ago
- University: Alabama A&M University
- Head coach: Salah Yousif (21st. season)
- Conference: SWAC; I Division
- Location: Normal, Alabama, US
- Stadium: John Hunt Park Stadium (capacity: 2,000)
- Nickname: Bulldogs
- Colors: Maroon and white
Home	Away

NCAA tournament runner-up
- 1978, 1981

NCAA tournament Semifinals
- 1980

NCAA tournament appearances
- 1977, 1979

Conference tournament championships
- n/a

Conference regular season championships
- n/a

The Alabama A&M Bulldogs soccer was the intercollegiate varsity men's soccer team representing the Alabama A&M University, located in Normal, Alabama. The team was a member of the Southwestern Athletic Conference (SWAC) athletic conference of NCAA Division I.

The Bulldogs' last head coach was Salah Yousif, who had started his coaching tenure in 1977 and leaded the team to win two national championships, in 1977 and 1979.

Alabama A&M played their home matches at the John Hunt Park Stadium, located in Huntsville with capacity for 2,000 spectators., which also served as home venue to the women's team.

== History ==
The Bulldogs' won their first NCAA DII national championship in 1977, which was also the first NCAA tournament contested by Alabama A&M. The Bulldogs eliminated Loyola Maryland 2–1 on extra time, Florida International 4–0, New Haven 2–0, and finally defeated Seattle Pacific 2–1 to win their first championship.

Alabama A&M also made a great campaign in 1978, where they not only eliminated but thrashed their opponents: Florida International (6–0), Loyola MD (4–0), Eastern Illinois (5–0) to reach their second consecutive NCAA final against the same opponent (Seattle Pacific, 17–5–4 record), but the team lost 0–1 on extra time with a golden goal by Bruce Raney. Until the final, the Bulldogs had an impressive record of 15 goals scored in only 3 matches.

By 1980, the Southwestern Athletic Conference had been promoted to NCAA Division I so the team participated in the NCAA DI championship. that same year the team debuted in the tournament, where they finished third after defeating Duke (2–0), William & Mary (1–0), and losing to San Francisco (0–1) in semifinals. Alabama A&M then defeated Hartwick 2–0 in the third place match.

Alabama A&M contested their second consecutive NCAA DI tournament in 1981. They eliminated Duke (1–0), Clemson (2–1), West Virginia (2–1), and Philadelphia Textile (3–2) to play their first final in the top division, but they were defeated by Connecticut 1–2 on extra time at Stanford Stadium.

Despite the success of their first years in the NCAA, the program decreased considerably in its later years. The 2010 season ended with no wins, being defeated in all of their games. The negative performances included several heavy defeats at the hands of UC Riverside (0–5), UNLV (1–8), Bradley (0–9), Evansville (0–9), and Jacksonville (0–7), among other disastrous results. That same season, the university announced its plans to cut off the program due to budget cuts. At the moment of the announcement, A&M was the only SWAC school that sponsored men's soccer.

On November 3, 2011, the A&M team played their last game, with a 0–8 defeat to Memphis to finish with another negative record of 0–15. The program only had two winning seasons in the last eight.

The program was discontinued following the 2011 season.

== Players ==
=== Roster ===
(As of 2010 season)

Note: Flags indicate national team as defined under FIFA eligibility rules; some limited exceptions apply. Players may hold more than one non-FIFA nationality.

No.	Pos.	Nation	Player
00	GK	USA	RaShad Hammonds
2	DF	USA	Marcus Wallace
3	DF	USA	Habeeb Alabi
6	MF	MLI	Moctar Konate
7	MF	MEX	Cesar Ramirez
8	MF	USA	Moses Ayo Adreniran
9	FW	UGA	Andrew Nkurunungi

No.	Pos.	Nation	Player
12	DF	USA	Mustefa Ahmed
14	FW	USA	Rishaun Redguard
17	MF	USA	Kyle Majors
18	DF	USA	Adres Moreano
19	FW	USA	Abraham Kassaye
20	DF	USA	Allen Adeleke

=== Players in the pros ===
Nat.	Player	Pro.	Selected teams	Ref.
(Nigeria)	Ike Udeh	1997	Kansas City Wizards), Jacksonville Cyclones	
(Nigeria)	Jean Harbor	1988	Washington Diplomats, Tampa Bay Rowdies, Colorado Rapids	
(The Gambia)	Matthew Mendy	2008	1. FC Kleve, 1. FC Vöcklabruck, Anhui Jiufang	
(Uganda)	Eugene Sseppuya	2005	Colorado Rapids, FC Urartu	

=== Other notable players ===
- (Eswatini) Mfanfuthi Bhembe
- (Eswatini) Lwazi Maziya
- (Eswatini) Mlondi Mdluli

== Coaches ==
=== Notable coaches ===
The Alabama A&M's most notable coach was Salah Yousif, born in Ethiopia, who had been initially hired in 1976 as an economics professor, then becoming soccer coach in 1977. Under his guidance, the men's program won two national championships within three years, apart from being runners-up in 1978. Yousif spent 21 seasons with the team, winning 238 matches. He achieved a 238–121–24 record in 21 years with the Bulldogs.

Yousif was the main promotor to the soccer development at Alabama A&M, convincing the university officials to start a team. The program became so successful that only lost four games between 1977 and 1980. Nevertheless, Yousif was fired by the university after an NCAA investigation about illegal activities. He was later reinstated when the NCAA exhonerated him from any of those accusations. Yousif died in an accident in his native country in 2013.

== Honours ==
=== National ===
Competition	Titles	Winning years
NCAA DII championship	2	1977, 1979

== Team statistics ==
=== NCAA appearances ===
Alabama A&M's appearances in NCAA tournaments (Divisions I and II) are listed below:

Key

- a.e.t. – Match went to extra time
- p – Match decided by a penalty shootout after extra time

Division II

Season	Stage	Rival	Res.	Score
1977	Champions	Seattle Pacific	W	2–1
1978	Runners-up	Seattle Pacific	L	0–1 (a.e.t.)
1979	Champions	Eastern Illinois	W	2–0

Division I

Season	Stage	Rival	Res.	Score
1980	Third place	Hartwick	W	2–0
1981	Runners-up	Connecticut	L	1–2
1982	First round	Clemson	L	0–2
1983	Quarterfinals	Connecticut	L	0–1
1984	Second round	Clemson	L	1–3
