= Eastern Illinois Panthers track and field =

- Founded: Men’s: 1912; Women’s: 1974
- University: Eastern Illinois University
- Athletic director: Tom Michael
- Head coach: Keith Roberts (1st season)
- Conference: OVC
- Location: Charleston, Illinois, US
- Indoor track: Lantz Field House
- Outdoor track: O'Brien Field
- Nickname: Panthers
- Colors: Blue and gray

NCAA Outdoor National Championships
- Men's: Div. II 1974

Conference Indoor Championships
- Men's: 1967, 1987, 1989, 1991, 1992, 1995, 1996, 1997, 1998, 1999, 2001, 2002, 2003, 2004, 2005, 2006, 2007, 2009, 2010, 2011, 2012, 2013, 2016, 2017, 2020, 2023 Women's: 2007, 2009, 2010, 2011, 2012, 2015, 2017

Conference Outdoor Championships
- Men's: 1981, 1985, 1987, 1988, 1989, 1990, 1991, 1992, 1995, 1996, 1997, 1998, 1999, 2000, 2001, 2002, 2003, 2004, 2007, 2009, 2010, 2011, 2012, 2013, 2015, 2019, 2021 Women's: 2007, 2009, 2010, 2011, 2012, 2013, 2016, 2017

The Eastern Illinois Panthers track and field program represents Eastern Illinois University in the sport of track and field. The program includes separate men's and women's teams, both of which compete in Division I of the National Collegiate Athletic Association (NCAA) and the Ohio Valley Conference (OVC). The Panthers host their home indoor meets in the Lantz Field House and their home outdoor meets at O'Brien Field, both located on the university's campus. The Panthers track teams are currently led by head coach Keith Roberts.

== History ==
The Eastern Illinois men's track and field team was organized in 1912 and got its first official coach in 1933 in Winfield Angus. Before 1933, coaching duties were assumed by a male faculty member; the Panthers women's team was formed in 1974–75. Eastern Illinois joined the Ohio Valley Conference (OVC) in 1996, and the Panthers track team began to compete in the OVC in the winter of 1996.

Historically, the Panthers have been a force in the OVC, and have won a total of 51 conference team championships since 1996-97. The Panthers men have won seventeen OVC outdoor championships (1997, 1998, 1999, 2000, 2001, 2002, 2003, 2004, 2007, 2009, 2010, 2011, 2012, 2013, 2015, 2019, 2021), and nineteen indoor championships (1997, 1998, 1999, 2001, 2002, 2003, 2004, 2005, 2006, 2007, 2009, 2010, 2011, 2012, 2013, 2016, 2017, 2020, 2023). The Panthers women have won eight OVC outdoor championships (2007, 2009, 2010, 2011, 2012, 2013, 2016, 2017), and seven indoor championships (2007, 2009, 2010, 2011, 2012, 2015, 2017).

== NCAA individual event champions ==
Individual Champions:

- 1955: Ray White, NAIA Long Jump
- 1967: John Craft, NAIA Triple Jump
- 1969: John Craft, NCAA College Division Triple Jump
- 1972: Rodney Jackson, NCAA College Division 400 hurdles
- 1973: Rodney Jackson, NCAA College Division 400 hurdles
- 1974: Darrell Brown, NCAA Division II Long Jump
- 1975: Toni Ababio, NCAA Division II Long Jump
- 1975: Toni Ababio, NCAA Division II Triple Jump
- 1976: Ed Hatch, NCAA Division II 400 Meter Dash
- 1979: Robert Johnson, NCAA Division II 110 hurdles
- 1981: Augustine Oruwari, NCAA Division II 110 hurdles
- 1988: Jim Maton, NCAA Division I 800 meter run (Indoor)
- 1992: Dan Steele, NCAA Division I 400 hurdles

Group Champions:

- 1981: 4x400 Relay, Women’s Track & Field AIAW II

== Eastern Illinois Olympic medalists ==
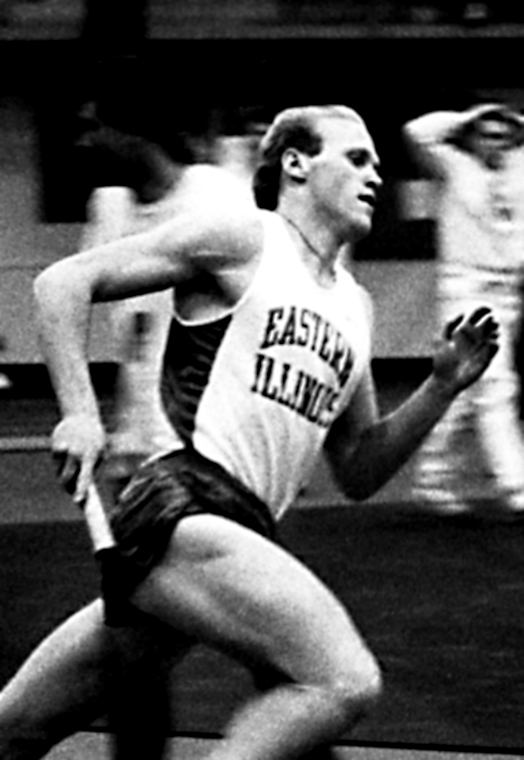
Dan Steele on an Eastern Illinois University Relay team

- Dan Steele, Bronze Medalist at the 2002 Winter Olympics

== Retired Jersey ==
Person	Event	Career	Date of Retirement	Ref.
John Craft	Triple jump	1965–1969	January 22, 2011	

== Notable former athletes ==
=== Track ===
- John Craft, placed 5th in the Men’s triple jump at the 1972 Summer Olympics
- Sandy Osei-Agyemang, advanced to the second round in the Men's 100 metres and Men's 4 × 100 metres relay at the 1972 Summer Olympics
- Dan Steele, track All-American, 400-meter National Champion, and Bronze Medalist at the 2002 Winter Olympics
- Darrin Steele, competed at the 1998 Winter Olympics and the 2002 Winter Olympics
