= 1983 NCAA Division I men's soccer tournament =

1983 Men's College Cup

Tournament details
- Country: United States
- Venue(s): Lockhart Stadium; Fort Lauderdale, Florida
- Teams: 23

Final positions
- Champions: Indiana (2nd title)
- Runners-up: Columbia
- Semifinalists: Connecticut; Virginia

Tournament statistics
- Matches played: 22
- Goals scored: 71 (3.23 per match)
- Attendance: 54,386 (2,472 per match)
- Top goal scorer(s): Jeff Gaffney, Virginia (4)

The 1983 NCAA Division I men's soccer tournament was the 25th annual tournament organized by the National Collegiate Athletic Association to determine the national champion of men's collegiate soccer among its Division I members in the United States.

The final match was played at Lockhart Stadium in Fort Lauderdale, Florida on December 10.

Defending champions Indiana defeated Columbia in the championship game, 1–0 after one overtime period, claiming their second national title.

== Qualifying ==
Three teams made their debut appearance in the NCAA Division I men's soccer tournament: Providence, UNLV, and Wisconsin–Green Bay.

== Bracket ==
First round
Wisconsin–Green Bay	0
Akron	7
SMU	1
Saint Louis	2
UCLA	0
San Francisco	5
UNLV (OT)	3
California	1
Philadelphia Textile	2
Fairleigh Dickinson	3
Duke	2
NC State	1
Clemson	0
Alabama A&M	1

Second round
Indiana (OT)	2
Akron	1
Eastern Illinois	1
Saint Louis	2
Virginia	2
William & Mary	1
San Francisco	3
UNLV	2
Columbia	2
Hartwick College	1
Rutgers	1
Fairleigh Dickinson	2
Duke	2
Alabama A&M	3
Providence	0
Connecticut	2

Quarterfinals
Indiana	2
Saint Louis	1
Virginia	3
San Francisco	2
Columbia	1
Fairleigh Dickinson	0
Alabama A&M	0
Connecticut	1

Semifinals
Indiana	3
Virginia	1
Columbia	4
Connecticut	0

Championship
Indiana (OT)	1
Columbia	0

== Final ==
December 10, 1983

Indiana	1–0 (a.e.t.)	Columbia

Lockhart Stadium, Fort Lauderdale, FL
Attendance: 5,257

== See also ==
- 1983 NCAA women's soccer tournament
- 1983 NCAA Division II soccer tournament
- 1983 NCAA Division III soccer tournament
- 1983 NAIA soccer championship
