= 1981 Connecticut Huskies men's soccer team =

Connecticut Huskies
1981 season
- Head Coach: Joe Morrone
- Stadium: Morrone Stadium
- NCAA: 20–3–2
- NCAA Tournament: Champions

The 1981 Connecticut Huskies men's soccer team represented the University of Connecticut during the 1981 NCAA Division I men's soccer season. The Huskies won their first NCAA title, and second overall when including NSCAA championships. The Huskies were coached by Joe Morrone, in his thirteenth season. They played home games at Morrone Stadium.

== Schedule ==
Date Time, TV	Rank^{#}	Opponent^{#}	Result	Record	Site City, State
Regular season
September 2*		Saint Louis	W 4–3 ^{OT}	1–0	Morrone Stadium • Storrs, CT
September 6*		Indiana	W 3–1	2–0	Morrone Stadium • Storrs, CT
September 13*		South Carolina	W 3–1	3–0	Morrone Stadium • Storrs, CT
September 16*		Boston College	W 3–1	4–0	Morrone Stadium • Storrs, CT
September 19*		at Vermont	W 2–0	5–0	Montpelier, VT
September 23*		at Boston University	W 3–1	6–0	Nickerson Field • Boston, MA
September 27*		Bridgeport	W 9–0	7–0	Morrone Stadium • Storrs, CT
September 30*		at California	W 1–0	8–0	Edwards Stadium • Berkeley, CA
October 2*		at San Francisco	L 1–2	8–1	San Francisco, CA
October 4*		at Stanford	L 0–3	8–2	Maloney Field • Palo Alto, CA
October 9*		at Dartmouth	W 1–0	9–2	Dartmouth, NH
October 11*		North Carolina	W 1–0	10–2	Morrone Stadium • Storrs, CT
October 14*		New Hampshire	W 5–0	11–2	Morrone Stadium • Storrs, CT
October 20*		UMass	W 3–1	12–2	Morrone Stadium • Storrs, CT
October 23*		at Brown	W 6–1	13–2	Stevenson Field • Providence, RI
October 25*		St. John's	W 7–0	14–2	Morrone Stadium • Storrs, CT
October 28*		Yale	W 4–0	15–2	Morrone Stadium • Storrs, CT
November 1*		Alabama A&M	T 1–1 ^{OT}	15–2–1	Morrone Stadium • Storrs, CT
November 6*		at Penn State	W 3–2	16–2–1	Jeffrey Field • State College, PA
November 8*		at Philadelphia Textile	L 3–4	16–3–1	Philadelphia, PA
November 14*		at Rhode Island	T 0–0 ^{OT}	16–3–2	URI Soccer Complex • Kingston, RI
NCAA Tournament
November 21*		Vermont	W 6–2	17–3–2	Morrone Stadium • Storrs, CT
November 29*		LIU Brooklyn	W 3–0	18–3–2	Morrone Stadium • Storrs, CT
December 5*		Eastern Illinois	W 2–1	19–3–2	Stanford Stadium • Palo Alto, CA
December 6*		Alabama A&M	W 2–1	20–3–2	Stanford Stadium • Palo Alto, CA
*Non-conference game. ^{#}Rankings from United Soccer Coaches. (#) Tournament seedings in parentheses.
