= 1981 NCAA Division I soccer tournament =

1981 College Cup

Tournament details
- Country: United States
- Venue(s): Stanford Stadium; Stanford, California
- Teams: 20

Final positions
- Champions: Connecticut (1st title)
- Runners-up: Alabama A&M
- Third place: Eastern Illinois (vacated)
- Fourth place: Philadelphia Textile

Tournament statistics
- Matches played: 20
- Goals scored: 63 (3.15 per match)
- Attendance: 31,200 (1,560 per match)
- Top goal scorer(s): (England) Elvis Comrie, Connecticut (5) (Cape Verde) Pedro DeBrito, Connecticut (5) (Ethiopia) Solomon Shiferow, Alabama A&M (5)

The 1981 NCAA Division I soccer tournament was the 23rd annual tournament organized by the National Collegiate Athletic Association to determine the national men's college soccer champion among its Division I members in the United States.

The final match was played at Stanford Stadium in Stanford, California on December 6.

Connecticut won their first Division I national title, defeating Alabama A&M in the final, 2–1 after one overtime.

This was the final NCAA Division I championship before the introduction of gendered tournaments in the fall of 1982.

== Qualifying ==
Two teams made their debut appearance in the NCAA Division I soccer tournament: NC State and Wisconsin.

== Bracket ==
First round
Clemson	3
NC State	1
Alabama A&M (OT)	1
Duke	0
San Diego State	4#
California	0
Eastern Illinois (OT)	2#
SIU Edwardsville	1

Second round
Clemson	1
Alabama A&M (2OT)	2
Virginia	1
West Virginia	2
Indiana	5
Wisconsin	1
Philadelphia Textile	2
Penn State	0
Long Island (4OT)	1
Columbia	0
Connecticut	6
Vermont	2
San Francisco	1
San Diego State (OT, PK)	2#
Saint Louis	0
Eastern Illinois	1#

Quarterfinals
Alabama A&M (OT)	2
West Virginia	1
Indiana	0
Philadelphia Textile	1
Long Island	0
Connecticut	3
San Diego State	0
Eastern Illinois	w/o#

Semifinals
Alabama A&M (OT, PK)	3
Philadelphia Textile	2
Connecticut	2
Eastern Illinois	1

Championship
Alabama A&M	1
Connecticut (OT)	2
Third place
Philadelphia Textile	2
Eastern Illinois	4

=== Note ===
- San Diego State and Eastern Illinois had their results vacated by the NCAA.

== Championship Rounds ==
=== Final ===
December 6, 1981

Alabama A&M	1–2 (a.e.t.)	Connecticut

Stanford Stadium, Palo Alto, California
Attendance: 3,500

== See also ==
- 1981 NCAA Division II soccer tournament
- 1981 NCAA Division III soccer tournament
- 1981 NAIA soccer championship
