= 1982 NCAA Division I men's soccer tournament =

1982 Men's College Cup

Tournament details
- Country: United States
- Venue(s): Lockhart Stadium; Fort Lauderdale, Florida
- Teams: 23

Final positions
- Champions: Indiana (1st title)
- Runners-up: Duke
- Semifinalists: Connecticut; SIU Edwardsville

Tournament statistics
- Matches played: 22
- Goals scored: 47 (2.14 per match)
- Attendance: 50,949 (2,316 per match)
- Top goal scorer(s): Sean McCoy, Duke (3)

The 1982 NCAA Division I men's soccer tournament was the 24th annual tournament organized by the National Collegiate Athletic Association to determine the national men's college soccer champion among its Division I members in the United States.

The final match was played at Lockhart Stadium in Fort Lauderdale, Florida on December 11.

Indiana won their first national title, defeating Duke in the final, 2–1 after eight overtimes.

The inaugural NCAA Division I women's soccer tournament was held concurrently during the fall of 1982.

== Qualifying ==
Four teams made their debut appearance in the NCAA Division I men's soccer tournament: Boston College, Evansville, George Mason, and North Texas State.

== Bracket ==
First round
St. Francis (NY)	1
Columbia	4
Duke	2
South Florida	1
Alabama A&M	0
Clemson	2
Fairleigh Dickinson	0
Penn State	1
San Francisco (PK)	3
Washington	2
San Diego State	1
Fresno State	0
Eastern Illinois	0
North Texas State (OT)	1

Second round
Long Island	3
Columbia	1
Connecticut (PK)	3
Boston College	2
Duke (PK)	2
Clemson	1
Virginia	0
George Mason	1
Indiana	1
Evansville	0
Philadelphia Textile	2
Penn State	0
San Francisco	2
San Diego State	0
SIU Edwardsville	1
North Texas State	0

Quarterfinals
Long Island	0
Connecticut (PK)	1
Duke	2
George Mason	0
Indiana	2
Philadelphia Textile	0
San Francisco	0
SIU Edwardsville	1

Semifinals
Connecticut	1
Duke	2
Indiana	1
SIU Edwardsville	0

Championship
Duke	1
Indiana (8OT)	2

== Final ==
December 11, 1982

Duke	1–2 (8OT)	Indiana
Sean McCoy 82'	Recap	Gregg Thompson 14' 159'

Lockhart Stadium, Fort Lauderdale, Florida
Attendance: 5,312

== See also ==
- 1982 NCAA women's soccer tournament
- 1982 NCAA Division II soccer tournament
- 1982 NCAA Division III soccer tournament
- 1982 NAIA soccer championship
