= Alabama A&M Bulldogs and Lady Bulldogs =

Sports teams of Alabama A&M University

- University: Alabama A&M University
- Nickname: Bulldogs; Lady Bulldogs
- NCAA: Division I (FCS)
- Conference: Southwestern Athletic Conference
- Athletic director: Paul A. Bryant
- Location: Normal, Alabama
- Varsity teams: 15
- Football stadium: Louis Crews Stadium
- Basketball arena: Alabama A&M Events Center
- Baseball stadium: Bulldog Baseball Field
- Softball stadium: Bulldog Softball Field
- Volleyball arena: T.M. Elmore Gym
- Colors: Maroon and white
- Website: aamusports.com

The Alabama A&M Bulldogs and Lady Bulldogs are the athletic teams that represent Alabama A&M University. The program will feature 17 varsity sports teams in the 2024–25 school year. A&M participates in the National Collegiate Athletic Association's Division I as a member of the Southwestern Athletic Conference. Russell Athletic is the current sponsor of the Alabama A&M University Athletic Department.

== Sports sponsored ==
Men's sports	Women's sports
Baseball	Basketball
Basketball	Bowling
Cross country	Cross country
Football	Soccer
Golf	Softball
Tennis	Tennis
Track and field^{1}	Track and field^{1}
	Volleyball
^{1} – includes both indoor and outdoor

Men's cross country is being reinstated starting in 2024–25 after having last competed in 2004.

=== Baseball ===
The Alabama A&M Bulldogs transitioned from Division II to NCAA Division I in 1999. The lone Bulldogs baseball conference title came in 1993 in the Southern Intercollegiate Athletic Conference.

=== Football ===
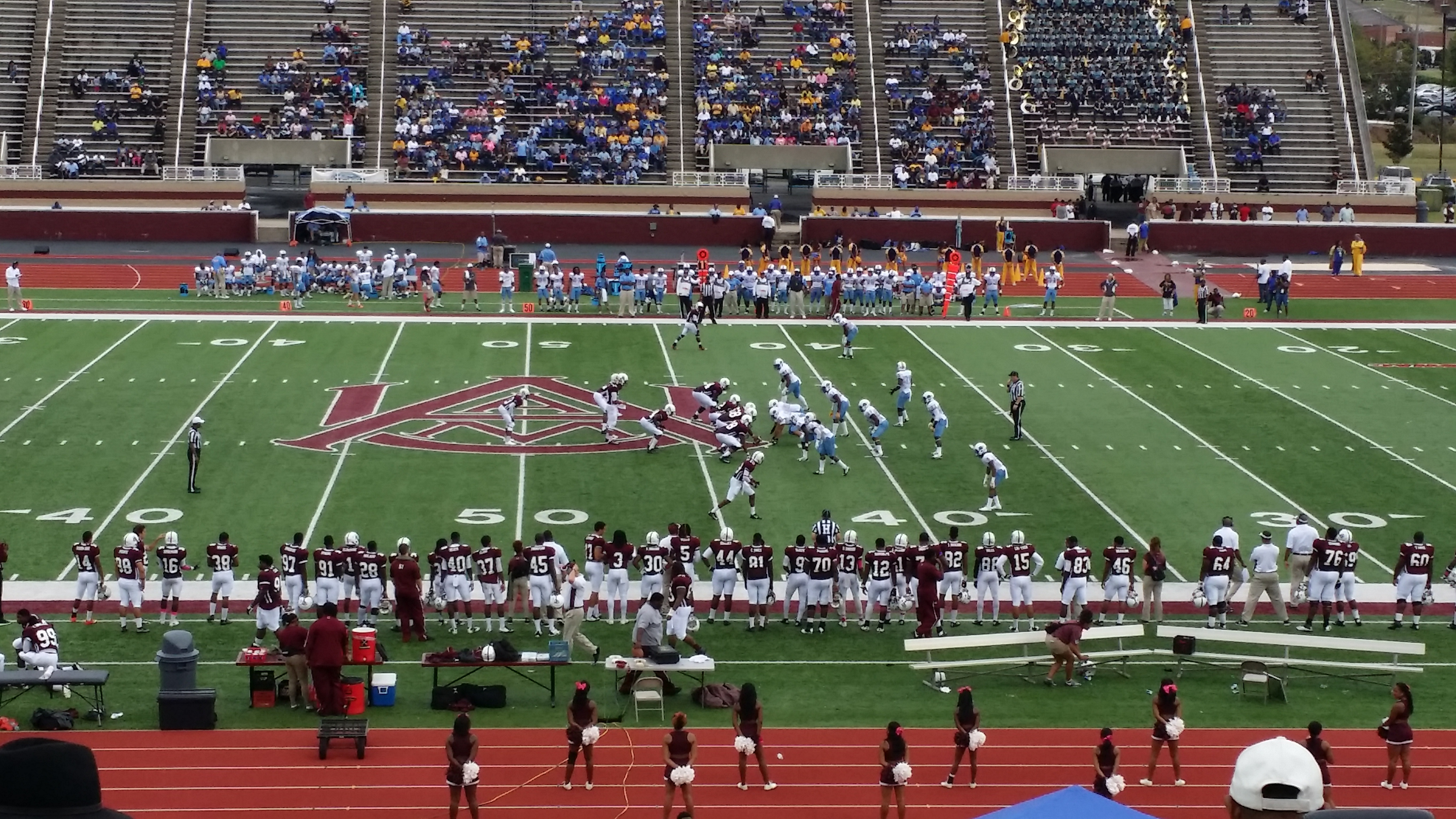
Alabama A&M vs. Southern University, 2014

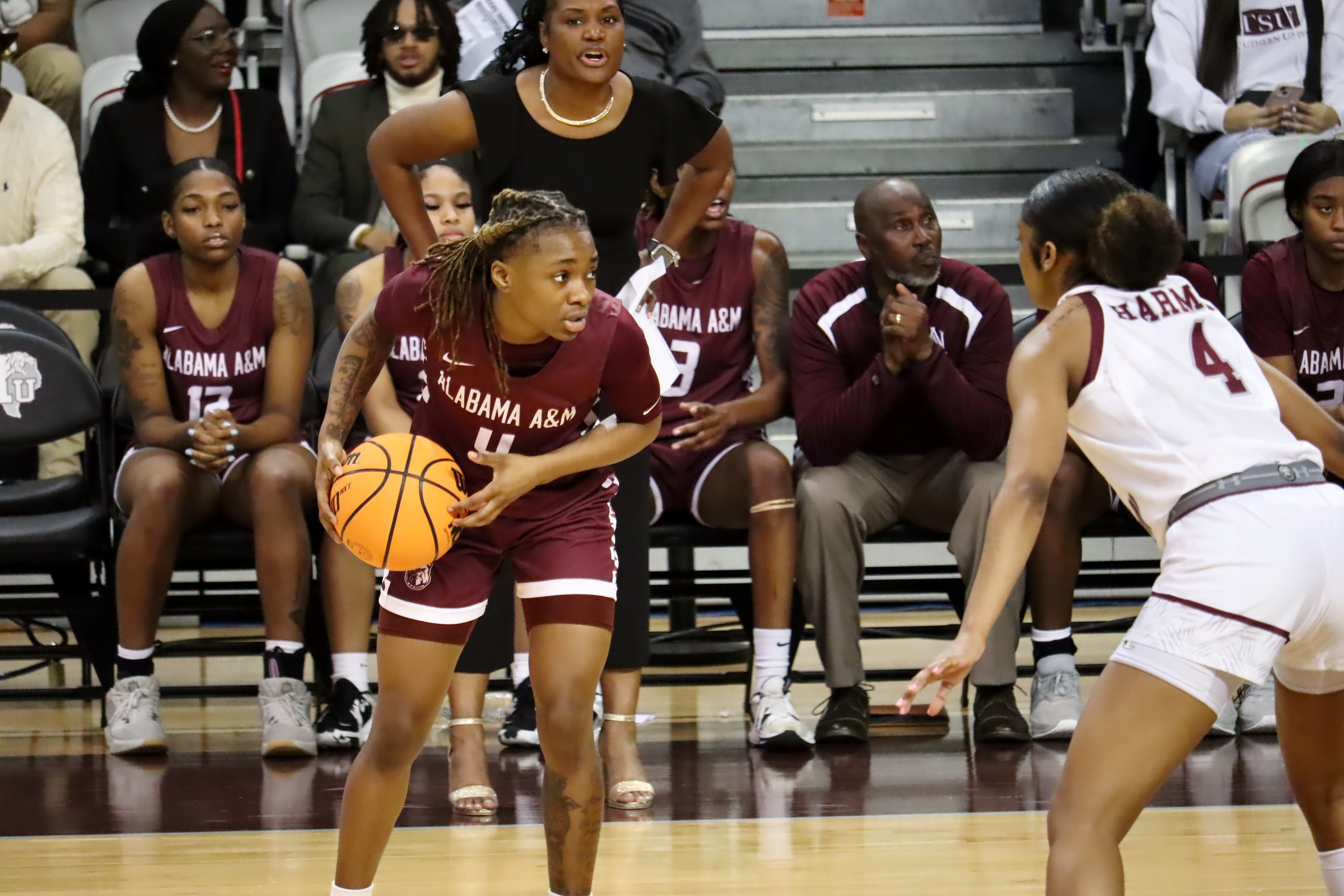
A Lady Bulldogs basketball game in 2024

The Alabama A&M Bulldogs are the college football team representing the Alabama Agricultural and Mechanical University. The Bulldogs play in the NCAA Division I Football Championship Subdivision.

=== Basketball ===
The Alabama A&M Bulldogs men's basketball team has had notable players including Desmond Cambridge, Mickell Gladness, Obie Trotter, Frank Sillmon, Willie Hayes (basketball), and Nigel Moore (basketball). The Bulldogs were coached by L. Vann Pettaway from 1986 to 2010. During that span, Pettaway amassed a 440–264 record with the a school-best 28–3 in 1992-93 and 1995–96. From 1992 to 1997, the Bulldogs went 136–20.

The team has made the NCAA tournament once, in 2005.

== Former sports ==
=== Men's soccer ===
Alabama A&M's men's soccer team won two NCAA Division II national championships in 1977 and 1979, finished Third place in 1980, and was runner-up in Division I in 1981. The program was discontinued following the 2011 season.

== National championships ==
Assoc.	Division	Sport	Year	Rival	Score
NCAA	Division II	Men's soccer (2)	1977	Seattle Pacific	2–1
NCAA	Division II	Men's soccer (2)	1979	Eastern Illinois	2–0
NCAA	Division II	Women's track and field (indoor) (1)	1992	Abilene Christian; Cal State Los Angeles	67–42 (+25)
NCAA	Division II	Women's track and field (outdoor) (1)	1992	Cal State Los Angeles	112–65 (+47)
NCAA	Division II	Women's track and field (outdoor) (1)	1993	Abilene Christian	92–86 (+6)
