= Athletics at the 1999 Pan American Games – Men's decathlon =

Men's decathlon at the Pan American Games

The men's decathlon event at the 1999 Pan American Games was held July 24–25.

== Results ==
The highest mark recorded in each event is highlighted in yellow

Rank	Athlete	Nationality	100m	LJ	SP	HJ	400m	110m H	DT	PV	JT	1500m	Points	Notes
1st place, gold medalist(s)	Chris Huffins	United States	10.47	7.57	14.87	2.06	49.46	14.44	46.97	4.60	59.73	5:09.55	8170	GR
2nd place, silver medalist(s)	Dan Steele	United States	10.71	6.92	13.40	1.94	47.45	14.54	46.08	4.50	63.73	4:33.31	8070	
3rd place, bronze medalist(s)	Raúl Duany	Cuba	10.85	7.09	13.28	2.09	48.90	14.62	41.29	4.30	58.69	5:00.54	7730	
4	Eugenio Balanqué	Cuba	10.84	6.70	15.01	1.94	DQ	14.64	42.14	4.80	58.68	5:07.60	6865	
5	Santiago Lorenzo	Argentina	11.27	6.50	12.05	1.70	49.30	16.36	35.41	4.20	57.70	4:39.88	6820	
