= Mlondi Mdluli =

Swazi footballer (1984–2006)

Personal information
- Date of birth: 11 December 1984
- Place of birth: Swaziland
- Date of death: 4 September 2006 (aged 21)
- Place of death: Swaziland
- Position: Goalkeeper

College career
| Years | Team | Apps | (Gls) |
| 2005–2006 | Alabama A&M Bulldogs | | |

Senior career*
| Years | Team | Apps | (Gls) |
| –2006 | Manzini Wanderers | | |

International career
| 2006 | Swaziland | 3 | (0) |
- * Club domestic league appearances and goals

Mlondi Mdluli (11 December 1984 – 4 September 2006) was a Swazi footballer who played as a goalkeeper.

== Career ==
In 2006, Mdludi joined Alabama A&M Bulldogs in the United States.

He died in a car accident.
