= Rockford Raptors =

- Full name: Rockford Raptors
- Nickname: Raptors
- Founded: 1994; 32 years ago
- Ground: Mercyhealth Sportscore Complexes
- League: USL League Two
- Website: rockfordraptors.org
Home colors

The Rockford Raptors are an American soccer club based in Rockford, Illinois. The club fields men's and women's pre-professional teams in USL League Two and the USL W League, respectively.

== History ==
The Raptors were founded in 1994 as a professional team in the United States Interregional Soccer League (USISL). The professional side played four seasons in the USL Second Division before competing in the Premier Development League in 1999 and 2000. After its professional operations ceased, the organization focused on youth player development.

In 2026, the club returned to pre-professional league competition, entering men's and women's teams in USL League Two and the USL W League. Both teams compete in the Heartland Division of the Central Conference.

The club lists the Mercyhealth Sportscore Complexes in Rockford as its game and training facilities.

== Coaches ==
- Jorge Espinoza 1994
- Glen Tourville 1995
- Roland Hahn 1996–1998
- Dave Huson 1999
- Frank Mateus 1999–2000
