= Jeff Gaffney =

American football player (born 1964)

No. 4
- Position: Placekicker

Personal information
- Born: October 22, 1964 (age 62); Washington, D.C., U.S.
- Listed height: 6 ft 2 in (1.88 m)
- Listed weight: 195 lb (88 kg)

Career information
- High school: Walt Whitman (Bethesda, Maryland)
- College: Virginia
- NFL draft: 1987: undrafted

Career history
- San Diego Chargers (1987)

Career NFL statistics
- Field goals made: 3
- Field goal attempts: 6
- Field goal %: 50
- Longest field goal: 27
- Stats at Pro Football Reference

John Francis Gaffney (born October 22, 1964) is an American former professional football player who was a kicker for the San Diego Chargers of the National Football League (NFL). He played college football for the Virginia Cavaliers.
