= 1980 NCAA Division I soccer tournament =

1980 College Cup

Tournament details
- Country: United States
- Venues: Tampa Stadium; Tampa, Florida
- Teams: 20

Final positions
- Champions: San Francisco (4th title)
- Runners-up: Indiana
- Third place: Alabama A&M
- Fourth place: Hartwick College

Tournament statistics
- Matches played: 20
- Goals scored: 67 (3.35 per match)
- Attendance: 25,729 (1,286 per match)
- Top goal scorer(s): John Hayes, Saint Louis (5)

The 1980 NCAA Division I soccer tournament was the 22nd annual tournament organized by the National Collegiate Athletic Association to determine the national men's college soccer champion among its Division I members in the United States.

The final match was played at Tampa Stadium in Tampa, Florida on December 14.

San Francisco won their fourth Division I national title, defeating Indiana Hoosiers in the final, 4–3 after one overtime.

== Qualifying ==
Three teams made their debut appearance in the NCAA Division I soccer tournament: Alabama A&M, Boston University, and William & Mary.

== Bracket ==
First round
Hartwick College (OT)	3
Cornell	2
Cleveland State	1
Wisconsin-Milwaukee	0
Duke	2
Appalachian State	1
SIU Edwardsville	0
SMU	2

Second round
Columbia	1
Hartwick College	2
Connecticut	6
Boston University	0
Indiana	3
Cleveland State	0
Philadelphia Textile	2
Penn State	3
Howard	1
William & Mary (OT, PK)	2
Alabama A&M	2
Duke	0
San Francisco (OT)	2
UCLA	1
Saint Louis	3
SMU	1

Quarterfinals
Hartwick College (2OT)	1
Connecticut	0
Indiana	3
Penn State	1
William & Mary	0
Alabama A&M	1
San Francisco	3
Saint Louis	2

Semifinals
Hartwick College	0
Indiana	5
Alabama A&M	1
San Francisco	2

Championship
Indiana	3
San Francisco (OT)	4
Third place
Hartwick College	0
Alabama A&M	2

== Championship Rounds ==
=== Final ===
December 14, 1980

Indiana	3–4 (OT)	San Francisco

Tampa Stadium, Tampa, Florida
Attendance: 7,052

== See also ==
- 1980 NCAA Division II soccer tournament
- 1980 NCAA Division III soccer tournament
- 1980 NAIA soccer championship
