= 1980 NCAA Division II soccer tournament =

1980 NCAA Division II Soccer Championship
Tournament details
- Country: United States
- Teams: 10

Final positions
- Champions: Lock Haven State (1st title)
- Runners-up: Florida International (1st title game)
- Third place: So. Conn. State

Tournament statistics
- Matches played: 10
- Goals scored: 30 (3 per match)
- Top goal scorer(s): Ron Basile, SCSC (3)

The 1980 NCAA Division II Soccer Championship was the ninth annual tournament held by the NCAA to determine the top men's Division II college soccer program in the United States.

Lock Haven State defeated Florida International in the final, 1–0 (after one overtime period), to win their first Division II national title (the Bald Eagles won the Division III tournament in both 1977 and 1978).

The final was played at Florida International University in Miami, Florida on November 29, 1980.

== Bracket ==
First Round; *Campus sites
Southern Connecticut	4
*	Marist	1
Eastern Illinois	1
*	Lock Haven State	3

Quarterfinals; *Campus sites
*	Hartford	1
Southern Connecticut	2(2OT)
*	Tampa	0
Florida International	1
*	Seattle Pacific	2
Chico State	3(3OT)
*	UMSL	1
Lock Haven State	2

Semifinals; *Campus sites
Southern Connecticut	1
Florida International	3
Chico State	0
Lock Haven State	1

Final; November 29, 1980; Miami, Florida
Florida International	0
Lock Haven State	1(OT)
Third Place
Southern Connecticut	2(2OT)
Chico State	1

== Final ==
November 29, 1980

Florida International	0–1 (OT)	Lock Haven State
	Report	Tom Kretsch 106' (Johnson)

FIU Soccer Stadium, Miami, Florida
Attendance: 800

== See also ==
- 1980 NCAA Division I soccer tournament
- 1980 NCAA Division III soccer tournament
- 1980 NAIA soccer championship
