= 1982 NCAA Division II soccer tournament =

Tournament details
- Country: United States
- Venue(s): Westchester, Florida
- Teams: 12

Final positions
- Champions: Florida International (1st title)
- Runners-up: Southern Connecticut State
- Semifinalists: UMSL; Oakland

Tournament statistics
- Matches played: 11
- Goals scored: 39 (3.55 per match)
- Top goal scorer(s): Hermann-Josef Engels, FIU (5)

The 1982 NCAA Division II soccer tournament was the 11th annual tournament organized by the National Collegiate Athletic Association to determine the national men's college soccer champion among its Division II members in the United States.

The final match was played at Florida International University in Miami, Florida in December 4.

Florida International defeated Southern Connecticut State in the final, 2–1, to win their first Division II national title. The Panthers (16-3-1) were coached by Karl Kremser.

== Bracket ==
First round
Cal State Hayward	0
UMSL	2
Cheyney State	0
Oakland	2
Tampa	5
Central Florida	1
Rollins	2
Florida International	3**

Quarterfinals
Cal State Dominguez Hills	0
UMSL	2
Southern Connecticut	4
Bridgeport	1
Southern Indiana	0
Oakland	1
Tampa	1
Florida International	4

Semifinals
UMSL	1
Southern Connecticut	2
Oakland	2
Florida International	3*

Championship
Southern Connecticut	1
Florida International	2

== Final ==
December 4, 1982

Florida International	2–1	Southern Connecticut State
Hermann-Joseph Engles 36:21' (Anderson); Max Rodriguez 46:21' (Anderson)	Report 1 Report 2	Hans Bogren 79:54' (Joseph)

Sunblazers Stadium, Miami, Florida
Attendance: 1,022

== See also ==
- 1982 NCAA Division I men's soccer tournament
- 1982 NCAA Division III men's soccer tournament
- NAIA Men's Soccer Championship
