= 1978 NCAA Division II soccer tournament =

1978 NCAA Division II Soccer Championship
Tournament details
- Country: United States
- Teams: 16

Final positions
- Champions: Seattle Pacific (1st title)
- Runners-up: Alabama A&M (2nd title game)
- Third place: Eastern Illinois

Tournament statistics
- Matches played: 16
- Goals scored: 46 (2.88 per match)
- Top goal scorer(s): Segun Adelke, AAMU (4)

The 1978 NCAA Division II Soccer Championship was the sixth annual tournament held by the NCAA to determine the top men's Division II college soccer program in the United States.

In a rematch of the previous year's final, Seattle Pacific defeated defending champions Alabama A&M in the final, 1–0 (after two overtime periods), to win their first national title and their first after losing their previous three appearances in Division II championship matches (1974, 1975, 1977).

The final was played at Florida International University in Miami, Florida on December 2, 1978.

== Bracket ==
First Round; *Campus sites
Southern Connecticut | 2
Marist | 0
New Haven | 3
Hartford | 1
Seattle Pacific | 2
Chapman | 0
San Francisco State | 2(3OT)
Chico State | 1
Eastern Illinois | 2
Wisconsin–Green Bay | 1
Missouri–Saint Louis | 1
Bloomsburg State | 0
Alabama A&M | 6
Florida International | 0
Loyola (MD) | 2
Rollins | 1

Quarterfinals; *Campus sites
Southern Connecticut | 3
New Haven | 1
Seattle Pacific | 2
San Francisco State | 1
Eastern Illinois | 1
Missouri–Saint Louis | 0
Alabama A&M | 4
Loyola (MD) | 0

Semifinals
Southern Connecticut | 0
Seattle Pacific | 1(3OT)
Eastern Illinois | 0
Alabama A&M | 5

Final; December 2, 1978; Miami, Florida
Seattle Pacific | 1(2OT)
Alabama A&M | 0
Third Place
Southern Connecticut | 1
Eastern Illinois | 2

== Final ==
December 2, 1978

| Seattle Pacific | 1–0 (a.e.t.) | Alabama A&M |
|---|---|---|
| Bruce Raney 126:47' | Report |

FIU Soccer Stadium, Miami, Florida
Attendance: 500

== See also ==
- 1978 NCAA Division I Soccer Tournament
- 1978 NCAA Division III Soccer Championship
- 1978 NAIA Soccer Championship
