= Glen Tourville =

American soccer player and coach

Personal information
- Full name: Glen T. Tourville
- Place of birth: Chicago, Illinois, U.S.

College career
Years	Team	Apps	(Gls)
1978–1979	Eastern Illinois Panthers		
1980–1981	UIC Flames		

Senior career*
Years	Team	Apps	(Gls)
1983	Dallas Americans		
- Oklahoma City Stampede
- Houston Dynamos
1987–1988	San Diego Sockers (indoor)		

Managerial career
- 1982: UIC Flames (assistant)
- San Diego Toreros (women's club)
- 1992: Aurora Spartans (assistant)
- 1993–1997: Aurora Spartans
- 1995: Rockford Raptors
- 1997–2006: Hendrix Warriors (men's & women's)
- 2007: Hendrix Warriors
- 2008: West Texas A&M Buffaloes (assistant)
- 2009–2014: Ohio State Buckeyes (women's assistant)
- 2017–2023: NC State Wolfpack (women's assistant)
- * Club domestic league appearances and goals

Glen Tourville is an American retired soccer player and former coach.

== Player ==
Tourville attended the Eastern Illinois University where he played on the men's soccer team in 1978 and 1979. In 1979, the Panthers went to the NCAA Men's Division II Soccer Championship where they lost to Alabama A&M. Financial difficulties led him to drop out of school. In the fall of 1980, he entered the University of Illinois at Chicago where he played on the men's soccer team for two seasons. The Dallas Tornado drafted Tourville in the 1982 NASL draft, but the team folded before the season began. He then attended several open tryouts, gaining a contract with the Dallas Americans of the American Soccer League. He later played for the Oklahoma City Stampede and Houston Dynamos of the United Soccer League. In 1987, the Dynamos played in the Lone Star Soccer Alliance. He also played for the reserve team of the San Diego Sockers of the Major Indoor Soccer League for the 1987–1988 season.

== Coach ==
In 1982, he briefly served as an assistant coach at the University of Illinois at Chicago. After retiring from playing, Tourville took a break from soccer for several years until he began coaching the University of San Diego's women's club team. In 1992, he became an assistant coach at Aurora University. In 1993, he became head coach, a position he held until 1997. In 1995, he coached the Rockford Raptors of the USISL. In 1997, he became the head coach of the Hendrix College men's and women's soccer teams. In 2007, he spent one season coaching only the men's team. He then spent one season as an assistant coach at West Texas A&M. In August 2008, he was hired as an assistant coach of the women's team at OSU. He has two sons who are also soccer players.
