= Tim Dykstra =

American handball player

Personal information
- Born: November 4, 1961 (age 64) Detroit, Michigan, U.S.
- Education: Eastern Illinois University

Timothy Joseph Dykstra (born November 4, 1961, in Detroit, Michigan) is an American former handball player who competed in the 1984 Summer Olympics.
