= Darrin Steele =

American bobsledder

Personal information
- Born: March 20, 1969 (age 57) Moline, Illinois, United States
- Education: Eastern Illinois University

Sport
- Sport: Bobsleigh
Medal record
Representing United States
Summer Universiade
Bronze medal – third place	1993 Buffalo	Decathlon

Darrin Steele (born March 20, 1969) is an American bobsledder. He competed at the 1998 Winter Olympics and the 2002 Winter Olympics. A native of Sherrard, Illinois, Steele graduated from Eastern Illinois University with a degree in economics. Steele was a member of the Eastern Illinois Panthers track and field team from 1989 to 1992.

== Personal life ==
Darrin's twin brother Dan Steele is also a bobsledder, who competed in the 1998 and 2002 Winter Olympics.
