= Damien Kelly =

Irish retired-American soccer forward (born 1958)

Personal information
- Date of birth: September 27, 1958 (age 68)
- Place of birth: Dublin, Republic of Ireland
- Height: 5 ft 11 in (1.80 m)
- Position: Forward

Youth career
- 1980–1983: Eastern Illinois Panthers

Senior career*
Years	Team	Apps	(Gls)
1984–1985	Dallas Sidekicks (indoor)	0	(0)
1985	Dallas Americans		
1986–1991	Memphis Storm (indoor)		

Managerial career
- 1990–1991: Memphis Rogues
- * Club domestic league appearances and goals

Damien Kelly is an Irish retired American soccer forward who played professionally in the United Soccer League, American Indoor Soccer Association and Southwest Independent Soccer League.

== Youth ==
Kelly attended Eastern Illinois University where he was a 1980 and 1981 First Team and a 1983 Third Team All American soccer player. He is a member of the Eastern Illinois Panthers Hall of Fame.

== Professional ==
In 1983, the Tulsa Roughnecks selected him in the North American Soccer League draft and the Kansas City Comets selected him in the first round (fifth overall) in the Major Indoor Soccer League draft. In 1984, he signed with the Dallas Sidekicks. In 1985, he played for the Dallas Americans in the United Soccer League. In September 1986, he signed with the Memphis Storm of the American Indoor Soccer Association. In 1989, the team came under new ownership which renamed it the Memphis Rogues. In 1990, the Rogues transferred to the Southwest Independent Soccer League and Kelly became a player-coach.

Kelly also played for the Ireland Olympic and Youth soccer teams.
