= Pierre Walters =

American football player and mixed martial artist

No. 91, 97
- Position: Defensive end

Personal information
- Born: March 25, 1986 (age 40); Forest Park, Illinois, U.S.
- Listed height: 6 ft 5 in (1.96 m)
- Listed weight: 269 lb (122 kg)

Career information
- High school: St. Joseph (Westchester, Illinois)
- College: Eastern Illinois
- NFL draft: 2009: undrafted

Career history
- Kansas City Chiefs (2009–2011); Spokane Shock (2012); Chicago Rush (2012)

Awards and highlights
- Second-team All-OVC (2006); 2× First-team All-OVC (2007–2008); 2× FCS All-American (2007–2008)

Career NFL statistics
- Tackles: 1
- Sacks: --
- Forced fumbles: --
- Stats at Pro Football Reference

Pierre Walters (born March 25, 1986) is an American former professional football defensive end and mixed martial artist. Previously, he was a linebacker for the Kansas City Chiefs of the National Football League (NFL). He was signed by the Chiefs as an undrafted free agent in 2009. In 2012, he played for the Spokane Shock and Chicago Rush of the Arena Football League. He played college football for the Eastern Illinois Panthers.

Pierre was the Total Fight Challenge light heavyweight (205 lbs) champion, winning the belt with a three-round unanimous decision victory over Ramiro Marquez on February 12, 2016.
