= Eastern Illinois Panthers men's soccer =

American college soccer team

- Founded: 1963
- University: Eastern Illinois University
- Athletic director: Tom Michael
- Head coach: Ruy Vaz (2nd season)
- Conference: OVC
- Location: Charleston, Illinois, US
- Stadium: Lakeside Soccer Field (capacity: 1,000)
- Nickname: Panthers
- Colors: Blue and gray
Home	Away

NCAA tournament championships
- NAIA: 1969

NCAA tournament runner-up
- 1979*

NCAA tournament College Cup
- 1974*, 1978*, 1979*, 1981

NCAA tournament appearances
- 1972*, 1973*, 1974*, 1975*, 1977*, 1978*, 1979*, 1980*, 1981, 1982, 1983 *at Division II level

Conference Regular Season championships
- AMCU: 1983, 1985, 1987, 1988, 1989; Mid-Cont: 1994

The Eastern Illinois Panthers men's soccer team represents Eastern Illinois University (EIU) as a member of the Ohio Valley Conference in NCAA Division I soccer. The Panthers play their home matches at Lakeside Soccer Field located directly south of the Lantz Arena complex on the EIU campus in Charleston, Illinois.

== Conference membership ==
Eastern Illinois is currently a full member of the Ohio Valley Conference (OVC), which did not sponsor men's soccer until the 2023 season. Before the OVC launched its men's soccer league, EIU was an associate member of the Summit League for men's soccer, and remains an associate of that conference in men's and women's swimming & diving.

In 1982, EIU was one of the eight charter members of the Association of Mid-Continent Universities (AMCU) which changed its name to the Mid-Continent Conference (Mid-Con) in 1989 and became the Summit League in 2007. The Panthers played soccer in the AMCU/Mid-Con until leaving for membership in the OVC in 1996. Upon joining the OVC, EIU also became an affiliate member of the Missouri Valley Conference (MVC) for men's soccer. The Panthers swimming & diving teams had returned to the Mid-Con in 1996; in fall 2011, EIU cut its membership to only two conferences as the men's soccer team returned to what is now the Summit League.

In March 2023, the OVC announced that it would start a men's soccer league in the 2023 season, allowing EIU to align men's soccer with the bulk of its other sports,

== Players ==
=== Roster ===
As of 18 Sep 2024

Note: Flags indicate national team as defined under FIFA eligibility rules; some limited exceptions apply. Players may hold more than one non-FIFA nationality.

No.	Pos.	Nation	Player
0	GK	USA	Lucas Ortiz
1	GK	USA	Chad Smith
2	FW	USA	Ashur Eshw
3	DF	USA	William Bruce
4	DF	USA	David Brown
5	DF	USA	Nate Hagemann
6	MF	BRA	Felipe Kerr Lourenco
7	FW	CAN	Samo Hassoun
8	MF	USA	Jared Cornejo
9	FW	ENG	Sam Eccles
10	MF	USA	Casey Welage
11	FW	USA	Adam Boykin
12	DF	USA	Trey Gora
13	FW	MNG	Bat-Od Buman-Uchral

No.	Pos.	Nation	Player
14	MF	USA	Kyle Kimberling
15	FW	USA	Sebastian Khoury
16	FW	USA	Jackson Cote
17	DF	CAN	Sebastian Piatkiewicz
18	MF	USA	Jake Pollock
20	DF	BRA	Lucas Santos
21	FW	GER	Frider Blunck
22	DF	USA	Kyle Ward
23	DF	USA	Patrick Osilaja
25	DF	ENG	Ben Martin
26	DF	USA	Lance Toutanji
27	MF	USA	Sam Brassard
30	GK	VIR	Whelan Joseph
32	GK	USA	Kyce Toutanji

=== Retired numbers ===
No.	Player	Pos.	Career	No. retired	Ref.
19	Erik Proffitt (Note: Proffitt died in April 1989 after contracting spinal meningitis. He was 20 years old.)	MF	1987–88	November 1988	

=== Notable former players ===
- Shady Omar, forward for the Egyptian Second Division A
- Mike Novotny, Goalkeeper for Chicago House AC
- Schellas Hyndman, former head coach of soccer's FC Dallas
- Matt Bobo, former North American Soccer League player
- John Baretta, former North American Soccer League goalkeeper
- George Gorleku, former Major Indoor Soccer League (1978–92) player
- Phil Vendredi, former center forward (1992–1994) player and GPA honoree.
- LeBaron Hollimon, former National Professional Soccer League (1984–2001) player
- Damien Kelly, former National Professional Soccer League (1984–2001) player
- Mark Simpson, former goalkeeper and assistant coach for D.C. United
- Jason Thompson, former player for D.C. United
- Glen Tourville, former Major Indoor Soccer League (1978–92) player

== Season results ==
Statistics overview
Season	Coach	Overall	Conference	Standing	Postseason
Eastern Illinois University (NAIA Independent) (1963–1971)
1963	Harold Pinther	4–1–0			
1964	Harold Pinther	2–5–0			
Harold Pinther:		6–6–0 .500			
1965	Fritz Teller	6–3–0			
1966	Fritz Teller	7–3–0			NAIA District
1967	Fritz Teller	5–3–0			
1968	Fritz Teller	5–5–0			NAIA District
1969	Fritz Teller	13–1–1			NAIA National Champions
1970	Fritz Teller	6–4			NAIA District
1971	Fritz Teller	5–5–2			NAIA District
Eastern Illinois University (Division II Independent) (1972–1982)
1972	Fritz Teller	7–3–1			NCAA Div. II Second Round
1973	Fritz Teller	7–4–2			NCAA Div. II Elite Eight
1974	Fritz Teller	10–5–0			NCAA Div. II Fourth Place
1975	Fritz Teller	8–4–1			NCAA Div. II First Round
1976	Fritz Teller	8–2–3			
Fritz Teller:		87–42–10 .662			
1977	Schellas Hyndman	10–4–1			NCAA Div. II Elite Eight
1978	Schellas Hyndman	15–5–0			NCAA Div. II Third Place
1979	Schellas Hyndman	14–4–3			NCAA Div. II Runner-up
1980	Schellas Hyndman	12–4–0			NCAA Div. II First Round
1981	Schellas Hyndman	19–2–2			NCAA Div. I Third Place
1982	Schellas Hyndman	12–3–5			NCAA Div. I First Round
Eastern Illinois University (AMCU/Mid-Con) (1983–1995)
1983	Schellas Hyndman	16–2–0	4–0–0	1st of 5	NCAA Div. I Second Round
Schellas Hyndman:		98–24–11 .778			
1984	Cizo Mosnia	11–5–1	2–2–0	3rd of 5	
1985	Cizo Mosnia	11–5–1	4–0–0	1st of 5	
1986	Cizo Mosnia	6–8–2	1–2–1	4th of 5	
1987	Cizo Mosnia	11–7–3	4–0–0	1st of 5	
1988	Cizo Mosnia	10–6–3	4–0–1	t-1st of 6	
1989	Cizo Mosnia	10–2–3	6–0–0	1st of 7	
1990	Cizo Mosnia	5–11–2	4–2–1	4th of 8	
1991	Cizo Mosnia	9–9–1	4–3–1	4th of 8	
1992	Cizo Mosnia	3–10–2	3–3–1	6th of 8	
1993	Cizo Mosnia	9–9–0	3–5–0	6th of 9	
1994	Cizo Mosnia	12–3–1	6–1–1	1st of 5–West	
Cizo Mosnia:		97–75–19 .558			
1995	Troy Fabiano	3–12–0	3–5–0	4th of 5–West	
Troy Fabiano:		3–12–0 .200			
Eastern Illinois University (Missouri Valley Conference) (1996–2010)
1996	Tim McClements	8–11–0	1–4–0	5th of 6	
1997	Tim McClements	4–15–0	3–4–0	5th of 8	
1998	Tim McClements	12–5–3	2–4–1	6th of 8	
1999	Tim McClements	6–11–1	0–6–1	8th of 8	
Tim McClements:		30–42–4 .421			
2000	Adam Howarth	12–6–1	6–5–0	t-5th of 12	
2001	Adam Howarth	6–10–1	2–7–0	9th of 10	
2002	Adam Howarth	8–11–1	3–5–1	7th of 10	
2003	Adam Howarth	5–12–2	0–8–1	10th of 10	
2004	Adam Howarth	5–12–1	1–7–1	t-8th of 10	
2005	Adam Howarth	5–9–3	2–4–1	6th of 8	
2006	Adam Howarth	11–7–2	1–3–2	6th of 7	
2007	Adam Howarth	12–6–3	2–3–1	5th of 7	
2008	Adam Howarth	5–11–3	0–5–0	6th of 6	
2009	Adam Howarth	6–8–3	2–6–1	5th of 6	
2010	Adam Howarth	4–12–1	1–5–1	7th of 8	
Eastern Illinois University (The Summit League) (2011–2022)
2011	Adam Howarth	7–9–1	1–4–1	7th of 7	
2012	Adam Howarth	3–13–1	1–5–1	7th of 7	
2013	Adam Howarth	1–14–2	1–4–1	6th of 7	
Adam Howarth:		90–140–24 .402			
2014	Mark Hansen	3–13–1	1–4–1	7th of 7	
Mark Hansen:		3–13–1 .206			
2015	Kiki Lara	3–14–0	1–5–0	7th of 7	
2016	Kiki Lara	5-12-1	2-4-0	6th of 7	
2017	Kiki Lara	4-9-6	2-2-1	4th of 6	
2018	Kiki Lara	3-11-4	1-2-2	4th of 6	
2019	Kiki Lara	5-9-2	1-2-2	5th of 6	
Kiki Lara:		20–55–13 .299	6–13–3		
2020	Ronnie Bouemboue	1-8-2	1-7-2	6th of 6	
2021	Ronnie Bouemboue	2-12-1	1-5	7th of 7	
Ronnie Bouemboue:		3–20–3 .173	2–12–2		
2022	Josh Oakley	1–12–3	0–7–1	7th of 7	
Eastern Illinois University (Ohio Valley Conference) (2023–present)
2023	Josh Oakley	4–10–5	3–5–2	6th of 8	
2024	Josh Oakley	2–12–2	1–8–1	8th of 8	
Josh Oakley:		7–34–10 .235	4–20–4		
2025	Ruy Vaz	4–9–4	3–4–3	6th of 8	
Ruy Vaz:		4–9–4 .353	3–4–3		
Total:		444–453–92 .495			
National champion Postseason invitational champion Conference regular season champion Conference regular season and conference tournament champion Division regular season champion Division regular season and conference tournament champion Conference tournament champion
