= 1977 NCAA Division II soccer tournament =

1977 NCAA Division II Soccer Championship
Tournament details
- Country: United States
- Teams: 16

Final positions
- Champions: Alabama A&M (1st title)
- Runners-up: Seattle Pacific (3rd title game)
- Third place: New Haven

Tournament statistics
- Matches played: 16
- Goals scored: 40 (2.5 per match)

The 1977 NCAA Division II Soccer Championship was the sixth annual tournament held by the NCAA to determine the top men's Division II college soccer program in the United States.

Alabama A&M defeated Seattle Pacific in the final match, 2–1, to win their first national title. This was the Falcons' third defeat in the final match, after losing appearances in 1974 and 1975. The final was played in Miami, Florida, on December 3, 1977.

== Bracket ==
First Round; *Campus sites
New Haven	3
Hartford	0
So. Conn. State	3
Le Moyne	0
Loyola (MD)	1
Alabama A&M	2(OT)
Florida International	2
UMBC	1
UM–Saint Louis	0
Eastern Illinois	1
UW–Green Bay	1
Western Illinois	0
Chico State	1
San Francisco State	2(3OT)
UC Davis	1
Seattle Pacific	2

Quarterfinals; *Campus sites
New Haven	1
So. Conn. State	0
Alabama A&M	4
Florida International	0
Eastern Illinois	0(2)
UW–Green Bay	0(3)
San Francisco State	1
Seattle Pacific	2

Semifinals
New Haven	0
Alabama A&M	2
UW–Green Bay	1
Seattle Pacific	2(3OT)

Final; December 3, 1977; Miami, Florida
Alabama A&M	2
Seattle Pacific	1
Third Place
New Haven	2(5)
UW–Green Bay	2(3)

== Final ==
December 3, 1977

Alabama A&M	2–1	Seattle Pacific
Luke Whitley 19:10' (Emnike); Kenneth Okafohe 64:22'	Report 1 Report 2	Servando Rivera 81:03'

FIU Soccer Stadium, Miami, Florida
Attendance: 5,175

== See also ==
- 1977 NCAA Division I Soccer Tournament
- 1977 NCAA Division III Soccer Championship
- 1977 NAIA Soccer Championship
