= John Craft =

American triple jumper

John Melvin Craft (born March 24, 1947, in Laurel, Mississippi) is an American former triple jumper who placed 5th in the Men's triple jump at the 1972 Summer Olympics. He attended Eastern Illinois University and graduated in 1969 and 1974. Craft also served as women’s track and field coach at Eastern until 2002.
