= Dan Steele =

American bobsledder and track-and-field athlete and coach

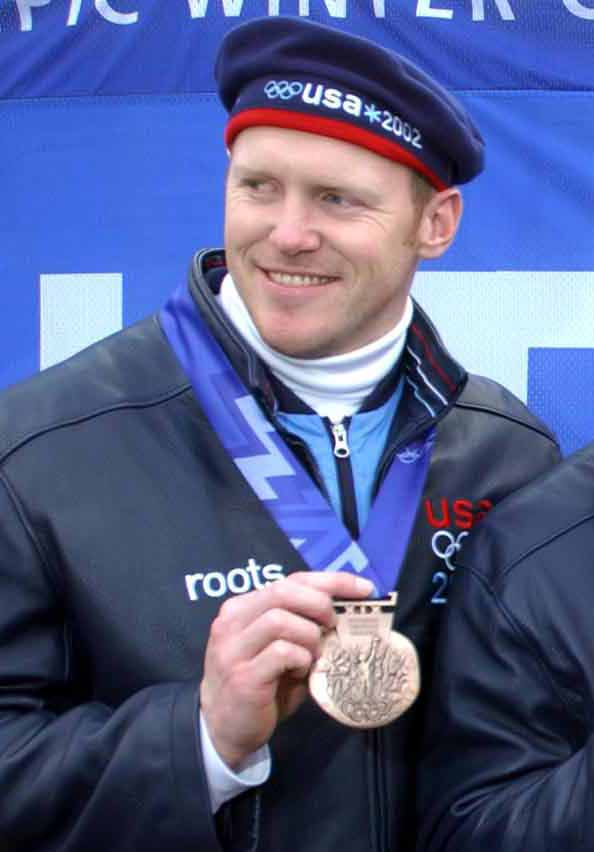
- Steele with bronze medal in Salt Lake City

Personal information
- Born: March 20, 1969 (age 57) Moline, Illinois, U.S.
- Education: Eastern Illinois University
Medal record
Representing the United States
Men's bobsleigh
Olympic Games
Bronze medal – third place	2002 Salt Lake City	Four-man
Men's athletics
Pan American Games
Silver medal – second place	1999 Winnipeg	Decathlon
Summer Universiade
Bronze medal – third place	1993 Edmonton	Decatlon

Dan Steele (born March 20, 1969) is an American bobsledder and track and field athlete who competed from the early 1990s to 2002. Competing in two Winter Olympics, he won the bronze medal in the four-man event at Salt Lake City in 2002. He was recently one of the most successful collegiate track and field coaches in America.

== Athletic career ==
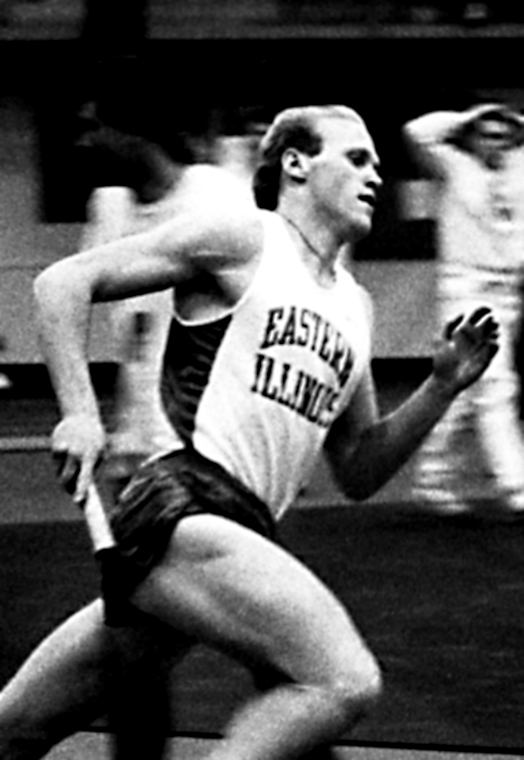
Dan Steele on an Eastern Illinois University Relay team

A native of Sherrard, Illinois, Steele graduated from Eastern Illinois University with a degree in sociology. During the 1990s, he also competed in athletics first in the 400 m hurdles (winning the 1992 NCAA title) and later in the decathlon, qualifying for the United States Olympic trials for the 1992, 1996, and 2000 Summer Olympics, earning his best finishes of fifth in the decathlon in the 2000 trials. Steele even finished eighth in the decathlon at the 1999 World Athletics Championships in Seville, Spain.

Steele also earned a silver medal at the 1999 Pan Am Games.

== Coaching career ==
In 1993, Steele moved from Illinois to Eugene, Oregon to train full-time in track and field. In 2001, he became a volunteer athletics coach for the University of Oregon. In between coaching stints, Steele competed in bobsleigh for the U.S. both in 1998 and 2002. At the 2002 Winter Olympics, he earned a bronze medal in the four-man event, a feat that ended a 46-year medal drought for the United States in that sport.

Retiring from bobsleigh after the 2002 Winter Olympics, Steele became the Head Track and Field coach at the University of Northern Iowa. Prior to UNI, Steele was the Associate Head Coach at the University of Oregon. In 2009, Steele was named the National Men's Coach of the Year for helping lead the Oregon men to an NCAA Indoor title. Steele was also named the West Region Women's Coach of the Year in 2009 for helping lead the Oregon women to their first Pacific-10 title since 1992. That same year he coached Ashton Eaton to the NCAA Decathlon title and Brianne Theisen to the NCAA Heptathlon title. This marked the first time in NCAA history both multis winners represented the same institution. The 2005 and 2007 NCAA West Regional Assistant Coach of the Year for Men’s Sprints and Hurdles and the 2008 Pac-10 Coach of the Year established himself as one of the nation’s top coaches. Steele guided athletes to eight individual NCAA titles, 24 conference titles, 31 All-America honors, 32 school records, five Pac-10 team titles and one NCAA team title.

In 2015, Steele was named the Iowa State Cyclones’ Men’s & Women’s Associate Head Track & Field coach.

== Achievements ==
Year	Tournament	Venue	Result	Extra
1999	Pan American Games	Winnipeg, Canada	2nd	Decathlon
1999	World Championships	Seville, Spain	8th	Decathlon

== Personal life ==
Dan's twin brother Darrin Steele is also a bobsledder who competed in the 1998 and 2002 Winter Olympics.

On July 28, 2017, Steele nearly died from a massive hemorrhagic stroke. He stepped away from coaching after the stroke. Steele spent 2.5 months in the hospital relearning how to walk and talk.

== Book ==
In 2021, Steele published American Steele, a memoir chronicling his life as an athlete, coach, and stroke survivor.
