= Sandy Osei-Agyemang =

Ghanaian sprinter

Personal information
- Born: July 19, 1949 (age 76) Ghana
- Education: Eastern Illinois University

Sandy Osei-Agyemang (born 19 July 1949) is a Ghanaian former sprinter who competed in the 1972 Summer Olympics.

Sandy advanced to the second round in the Men's 100 metres and Men's 4 × 100 metres relay at the 1972 Summer Olympics.
