= 1979 NCAA Division II soccer tournament =

1979 NCAA Division II Soccer Championship
Tournament details
- Country: United States
- Teams: 10

Final positions
- Champions: Alabama A&M (2nd title)
- Runners-up: Eastern Illinois (1st title game)
- Third place: Seattle Pacific

Tournament statistics
- Matches played: 10
- Goals scored: 26 (2.6 per match)
- Top goal scorer(s): Gordon Prempeh, EIU (3)

The 1979 NCAA Division II Soccer Championship was the eighth annual tournament held by the NCAA to determine the top men's Division II college soccer program in the United States.

Alabama A&M defeated Eastern Illinois in the final, 2–0, to win their second national title. This was the Bulldogs' third consecutive appearance in the Division II championship match after winning in 1977 and losing in 1978.

The final was played at Florida International University in Miami, Florida on December 1, 1979.

== Bracket ==
First Round; *Campus sites
Western Illinois	1
*	Eastern Illinois	3
Rollins	1
*	Florida International	4

Quarterfinals; *Campus sites
*	So. Conn. State	2
Mercy	1
*	UM–Saint Louis	0
Eastern Illinois	3
*	Seattle Pacific	3
Chapman	0
*	Alabama A&M	3
Florida International	0

Semifinals
So. Conn. State	0
Eastern Illinois	1
Seattle Pacific	0
Alabama A&M	1(OT)

Final; December 1, 1979; Miami, Florida
Eastern Illinois	0
Alabama A&M	2
Third Place
So. Conn. State	0
Seattle Pacific	1

== Final ==
December 1, 1979

Eastern Illinois	0–2	Alabama A&M
	Report	Felix Onyekwelu 30:41' (Sinclair); Segun Adele 59:49' (Merenini)

FIU Soccer Stadium, Miami, Florida
Attendance: 300

== See also ==
- 1979 NCAA Division I Soccer Tournament
- 1979 NCAA Division III Soccer Championship
- 1979 NAIA Soccer Championship
