= Conference USA Men's Soccer Coach of the Year =

Annual award

C-USA Men's Soccer Player of the Year
- Sport: Soccer
- League: Conference USA
- Awarded for: The best men's soccer coach in Conference USA
- Country: United States
- Presented by: Conference USA head coaches

History
- First award: 1995
- Final award: 2021
- Most recent: Kyle Russell, FIU

The Conference USA Men's Soccer Coach of the Year was an annual award given to the best soccer coach in Conference USA during the NCAA Division I men's soccer season. Since its inception, the award has been given to 18 different coaches. Chris Grassie, Tim McClements, Bob Gray, Tom McIntosh, Richie Grant, and Mike Getman have each won the award twice. Schellas Hyndman and John Hackworth have gone on to coach professionally in MLS.

== Coach of the Year ==
- 2021: Kyle Russell, FIU
- 2020: Chris Grassie, Marshall
- 2019: Chris Grassie, Marshall
- 2018: Johan Cedergren, Kentucky
- 2017: Kevin Nylen, FIU
- 2016: Kevin Langan, Charlotte
- 2015: Scott Calabrese, FIU and Johan Cedergren, Kentucky
- 2014: Johan Cedergren, Kentucky
- 2013: Jeremy Fishbein, New Mexico
- 2012: Tim McClements, SMU
- 2011: Mark Berson, South Carolina
- 2010: Tim McClements, SMU
- 2009: Bob Gray, Marshall
- 2008: Tom McIntosh, Tulsa
- 2007: Tom McIntosh, Tulsa
- 2006: Schellas Hyndman, SMU
- 2005: Bob Gray, Marshall
- 2004: Richie Grant, Memphis
- 2003: Hylton Dayes, Cincinnati
- 2002: Tony Colavecchia, Louisville
- 2001: Dan Donigan, Saint Louis
- 2000: Richie Grant, Memphis
- 1999: Mike Getman, UAB
- 1998: John Hackworth, USF
- 1997: Jeff Cook, Cincinnati
- 1996: John Tart, Charlotte
- 1995: Mike Getman, UAB
