= 2022 American Athletic Conference men's soccer season =

- League: NCAA Division I
- Sport: Soccer
- Duration: August 25, 2022 - November 13, 2022
- Teams: 10

2023 MLS SuperDraft

Regular Season
- Season champions: FIU
- Runners-up: SMU

Tournament
- Champions: FIU
- Runners-up: South Florida

American Athletic Conference men's soccer seasons
- ← 2021 2023

2022 American Athletic Conference men's soccer standings
	Conf.					Overall
Team	W		L		T	W		L		T
No. 19 FIU‡	6	–	2	–	1	13	–	5	–	2
No. 18 SMU+	6	–	3	–	0	10	–	6	–	1
South Florida+	5	–	1	–	3	9	–	7	–	4
No. 15 Tulsa+	5	–	3	–	1	10	–	5	–	2
Memphis+	5	–	3	–	1	9	–	6	–	4
Charlotte	3	–	4	–	2	9	–	5	–	2
Florida Atlantic	3	–	4	–	2	4	–	9	–	3
UCF	3	–	6	–	0	6	–	7	–	0
UAB	1	–	5	–	3	3	–	9	–	4
Temple	1	–	7	–	1	4	–	9	–	3
‡ – Tournament champion + – At-large invitation to the 2022 NCAA tournament; As of December 13, 2022; Rankings from United Soccer Coaches; Source: The American

The 2022 American Athletic Conference men's soccer season was the 10th season of men's varsity soccer in the American Athletic Conference (The American). The season culminated with the 2022 American Athletic Conference Men's Soccer Tournament.

== Background ==
=== Previous season ===
Tulsa was the regular season champions, earning their first regular season title since 2009. The Golden Hurricane also completed the double by winning the 2021 American Athletic Conference Men's Soccer Tournament, making it their first tournament title since 2016. The Golden Hurricane earned the conference's automatic berth into the 2021 NCAA Division I Men's Soccer Tournament. Tulsa earned a national seed (the 6th overall seed) and reached the third round (Sweet Sixteen) before losing to West Virginia in overtime.

Two players from the American were selected in the third round of the 2022 MLS SuperDraft. SMU's Skage Simonsen was selected by D.C. United with the 69th overall pick and UCF's Nick Taylor was selected by Orlando City with the 74th overall pick. Additionally, Yanis Leerman of UCF was also drafted.

=== Program changes ===
On May 4, 2022, American Conference commissioner Mike Aresco announced the addition of affiliate member institutions (UAB, Florida Atlantic, FIU and Charlotte) for men's soccer beginning in the fall 2022 season. All of these schools except FIU will become full members of The American on July 1, 2023.

== Teams ==
=== Stadiums and Locations ===
Team	Location	Stadium	Capacity
Charlotte 49ers	Charlotte, North Carolina	Transamerica Field	4,000
Florida Atlantic Owls	Boca Raton, Florida	FAU Soccer Stadium	1,000
FIU Panthers	University Park, Florida	FIU Soccer Stadium	1,000
Memphis Tigers	Memphis, Tennessee	Mike Rose Soccer Complex	2,500
SMU Mustangs	Dallas, Texas	Westcott Field	4,000
South Florida Bulls	Tampa, Florida	Corbett Stadium	3,000
Temple Owls	Philadelphia, Pennsylvania	Temple Owls Sports Complex	500
Tulsa Golden Hurricane	Tulsa, Oklahoma	Hurricane Soccer & Track Stadium	2,000
UAB Blazers	Birmingham, Alabama	PNC Field	5,000
UCF Knights	Orlando, Florida	UCF Soccer and Track Stadium	2,000

== Head coaches ==
Note: All stats current through the completion of the 2021 season

Team	Head coach	Previous job	Years at school	Overall record	Record at school	American record	NCAA Tournaments	NCAA College Cups	NCAA Titles
Charlotte	Kevin Langan	Charlotte (asst.)	10	114–48–26 (.676)	114–48–26 (.676)	0–0–0 (–)	6	0	0
Florida Atlantic	Joey Worthen	South Carolina (asst.)	5	26–46–6 (.372)	26–46–6 (.372)	0–0–0 (–)	0	0	0
FIU	Kyle Russell	Coastal Carolina (asst.)	2	18–8–4 (.667)	18–8–4 (.667)	0–0–0 (–)	1	0	0
Memphis	Richard Mulrooney	Memphis (asst.)	8	50–63–17 (.450)	50–63–17 (.450)	24–39–9 (.396)	0	0	0
SMU	Kevin Hudson	SMU (asst.)	7	79–31–14 (.694)	79–31–14 (.694)	34–16–6 (.661)	3	0	0
South Florida	Bob Butehorn	Florida Gulf Coast	5	162–128–36 (.552)	33–34–9 (.493)	19–17–5 (.524)	5	0	0
Temple	Brian Rowland	Maryland (asst.)	4	5–10–4 (.368)	5–10–4 (.368)	2–4–1 (.357)	0	0	0
Tulsa	Tom McIntosh	Tulsa (asst.)	27	275–187–55 (.585)	275–187–55 (.585)	31–26–7 (.539)	11	0	0
UAB	Jeff Kinney	Virginia Tech (asst.)	3	8–36–4 (.208)	8–36–4 (.208)	0–0–0 (–)	0	0	0
UCF	Scott Calabrese	FIU	5	139–91–28 (.593)	54–24–8 (.674)	28–10–3 (.720)	6	0	0

== Preseason ==
=== Recruiting classes ===
Rankings
Team	TDS	CSN	Signees
Charlotte			
Florida Atlantic			
FIU			
Memphis			
SMU			
South Florida			
Temple			
Tulane			
UAB			
UCF			

=== Preseason Coaches polls ===
The 2022 AAC Preseason Poll was released on August 23, 2022. The league's head coaches ranked Tulsa as the preseason favorite, with a unanimous 9 first place votes. Full results of the poll are shown below:

Predicted finish	Team	Votes (1st place)
1	Tulsa	81 (9)
2	UCF	66
T-3	Charlotte	60
T-3	FIU	60 (1)
5	SMU	58
6	South Florida	36
7	Memphis	31
8	Florida Atlantic	27
9	Temple	19
10	UAB	14

=== Preseason awards ===
==== All−American Teams ====
USC 1st Team	USC 2nd Team	TDS 1st Team	TDS 2nd Team	CSN 1st Team	CSN 2nd Team

==== Preseason All AAC ====
First Team

Second Team

All AAC Honorable Mention (received votes from four or more members of the media):

- Charlotte:
- Florida Atlantic:
- FIU:
- Memphis:
- SMU:
- South Florida:
- Temple:
- Tulane:
- UAB:
- UCF:

=== Preseason exhibitions ===
Date	Time	Visiting team	Home team	Site	TV	Result	Attendance	Ref.
August 12	5:00 p.m.	Temple	St. John's	Belson Stadium • Queens, NY		L 1-2		
August 12	7:00 p.m.	Saint Leo	South Florida	Corbett Stadium • Tampa, FL		W 1-0		
August 12	TBA	Tulsa	Central Arkansas	Bill Stephens Track/Soccer Complex • Conway, AR		W 3-1		
August 13	7:00 p.m.	Charlotte	Virginia	Klöckner Stadium • Charlottesville, VA		W 3-2		
August 14	7:00 p.m.	William Carey	UAB	PNC Field • Birmingham, AL		L 0-1	212	
August 14	8:00 p.m.	Memphis	Belmont	E. S. Rose Park • Nashville, TN		W 1-0		
August 16	12:00 p.m.	Richland CC	Tulsa	Hurricane Soccer & Track Stadium • Tulsa, OK		W 8-0		
August 16	7:00 p.m.	Tampa	South Florida	Corbett Stadium • Tampa, FL		W 1-0		
August 17	7:00 p.m.	UAB	Belmont	E. S. Rose Park • Nashville, TN		W 3-0		
August 17	8:00 p.m.	Central Methodist	Memphis	Memphis Soccer & Track Stadium • Memphis, TN		W 4-2		
August 19	8:00 p.m.	Central Methodist	Tulsa	Hurricane Soccer & Track Stadium • Tulsa, OK		T 0-0	116	
August 20	7:00 p.m.	USC Upstate	Charlotte	Transamerica Field • Charlotte, NC		W 6-1		
August 20	7:00 p.m.	Eckerd	South Florida	Corbett Stadium • Tampa, FL		W 10-1		
August 20	7:00 p.m.	UAB	Lipscomb	Lipscomb Soccer Complex • Nashville, TN		L 0-7		
August 20	8:00 p.m.	Incarnate Word	SMU	Westcott Field • Dallas, TX		W 1-0		
^{#}Rankings from United Soccer Coaches. All times are in Eastern Time.

== Regular season ==
Index to colors and formatting
AAC member won
AAC member lost
AAC member tied
AAC teams in **bold**

All times Eastern time.

=== Week 1 (Aug. 25 – Aug. 29) ===
Date	Time (ET)	Visiting team	Home team	Site	Result	Attendance
August 25	4:00 p.m.	**Charlotte**	UConn	Morrone Stadium • Mansfield, CT	**W** 3-1	904
August 25	6:00 p.m.	No. 11 **Tulsa**	Marquette	Valley Fields • Milwaukee, WI	**W** 4-2	250
August 25	7:00 p.m.	Lehigh	**Temple**	Temple Owls Sports Complex • Philadelphia, PA	**W** 1-0	507
August 25	7:00 p.m.	Akron	No. 18 **FIU**	FIU Soccer Stadium • Westchester, FL	**L** 3-5	868
August 25	7:00 p.m.	Florida Gulf Coast	**South Florida**	Corbett Stadium • Tampa, FL	**T** 0-0	583
August 25	8:00 p.m.	**UCF**	No. 15 Wake Forest	Spry Stadium • Winston-Salem, NC	**L** 0-1	1,733
August 25	8:00 p.m.	Oral Roberts	**SMU**	Westcott Field • Dallas, TX	**W** 4-0	1,400
August 26	5:00 p.m.	**Memphis**	Queens	PNC Field • Birmingham, AL	**W** 5-0	150
August 26	8:00 p.m.	Charleston	**UAB**	PNC Field • Birmingham, AL	**W** 2-0	330
August 28	12:30 p.m.	**Memphis**	Charleston	PNC Field • Birmingham, AL	**T** 1-1	250
August 28	3:30 p.m.	Queens	**UAB**	PNC Field • Birmingham, AL	**W** 3-0	300
August 28	6:00 p.m.	Lynn	**Florida Atlantic**	FAU Soccer Stadium • Boca Raton, FL	**T** 2-2	471
August 28	7:30 p.m.	**South Florida**	No. 24 North Carolina	Dorrance Field • Chapel Hill, NC	**L** 0-1	691
August 28	10:00 p.m.	**SMU**	Stanford	Cagan Stadium • Stanford, CA	**L** 1-3	753
August 29	7:00 p.m.	No. 18 **FIU**	No. 25 St. John's	Belson Stadium • Queens, NY	**W** 1-0	1,500
August 29	7:00 p.m.	Gardner–Webb	**Charlotte**	Transamerica Field • Charlotte, NC	**W** 4-0	708
August 29	7:00 p.m.	North Florida	**UCF**	UCF Soccer and Track Stadium • Orlando, FL	**W** 2-1	416
August 29	7:00 p.m.	Seton Hall	**Temple**	Temple Owls Sports Complex • Philadelphia, PA	**T** 1-1	421

Players of the Week

Offensive		Defensive	
Player	Team	Player	Team
Jose Ortiz	SMU	Bryce Meredith	Memphis

=== Week 2 (Aug. 30 – Sep. 5) ===
Date	Time (ET)	Visiting team	Home team	Site	Result	Attendance
August 31	6:00 p.m.	Stetson	**Florida Atlantic**	FAU Soccer Stadium • Boca Raton, FL	**W** 2-1	351
September 1	8:00 p.m.	Xavier	**Memphis**	Memphis Soccer & Track Stadium • Memphis, TN	**L** 0-1	307
September 2	3:00 p.m.	**Temple**	Georgetown	Shaw Field • Washington, DC	**L** 2-5	1,067
September 2	8:00 p.m.	**South Florida**	Marquette	Valley Fields • Milwaukee, WI	**L** 1-0	358
September 2	8:00 p.m.	Kansas City	**Tulsa**	Hurricane Soccer & Track Stadium • Tulsa, OK	**W** 4-1	559
September 2	8:00 p.m.	Central Arkansas	**SMU**	Westcott Field • Dallas, TX	**W** 2-0	800
September 3	7:00 p.m.	No. 23 Lipscomb	**Florida Atlantic**	FAU Soccer Stadium • Boca Raton, FL	**L** 0-2	236
September 3	7:30 p.m.	**FIU**	North Carolina	Dorrance Field • Chapel Hill, NC	**W** 2-1	774
September 3	8:00 p.m.	Wake Forest	**UAB**	PNC Field • Birmingham, AL	**L** 0-2	315
September 4	8:00 p.m.	**Charlotte**	Georgia Southern	Eagle Field • Statesboro, GA	**W** 5-0	201
September 5	3:00 p.m.	UC Riverside	**UCF**	UCF Soccer and Track Stadium • Orlando, FL	**W** 3-0	343
September 5	7:00 p.m.	Penn	**Temple**	Temple Owls Sports Complex • Philadelphia, PA	**T** 1-1	551
September 5	8:00 p.m.	Oral Roberts	**Tulsa**	Hurricane Soccer & Track Stadium • Tulsa, OK	**W** 4-0	807
September 5	8:00 p.m.	Texas–Rio Grande Valley	**SMU**	Westcott Field • Dallas, TX	**W** 7-2	125

Players of the Week

Offensive		Defensive	
Player	Team	Player	Team
Stephen Afrifa	FIU	Sean Suber	Charlotte

=== Week 3 (Sep. 6 – Sep. 12) ===
Date	Time (ET)	Visiting team	Home team	Site	Result	Attendance
September 6	7:00 p.m.	North Florida	**FIU**	FIU Soccer Stadium • Westchester, FL	**W** 2-0	625
September 6	7:30 p.m.	Washington	**South Florida**	Corbett Stadium • Tampa, FL	**L** 0-3	526
September 7	7:00 p.m.	**Florida Atlantic**	Army	Malek Stadium at Clinton Field • West Point, NY	**L** 0-2	150
September 9	5:00 p.m.	Detroit Mercy	**Charlotte**	Transamerica Field • Charlotte, NC	**W** 5-0	837
September 9	7:00 p.m.	Mercer	**South Florida**	Corbett Stadium • Tampa, FL	**W** 2-0	313
September 9	7:00 p.m.	Lafayette	**Temple**	Temple Owls Sports Complex • Philadelphia, PA	**L** 1-3	533
September 9	8:00 p.m.	**SMU**	Saint Louis	Hermann Stadium • St. Louis, MO	**W** 3-0	1,719
September 9	8:00 p.m.	Wisconsin	**UAB**	PNC Field • Birmingham, AL	**L** 0-2	286
September 9	9:00 p.m.	**UCF**	UC Irvine	Anteater Stadium • Irvine, CA	**W** 3-2	175
September 10	6:00 p.m.	**FIU**	New Hampshire	Bremner Field • Durham, NH	**L** 0-3	1,823
September 10	7:00 p.m.	**Florida Atlantic**	Marist	Tenney Stadium at Leonidoff Field • Poughkeepsie, NY	**L** 0-2	620
September 10	8:00 p.m.	Green Bay	**Memphis**	Memphis Soccer & Track Stadium • Memphis, TN	**W** 1-0	277
September 11	8:00 p.m.	Kentucky	**Tulsa**	Hurricane Soccer & Track Stadium • Tulsa, OK	**T** 1-1	766

Players of the Week

Offensive		Defensive	
Player	Team	Player	Team
Knut Ahlander	SMU	Cam Weston	Memphis

=== Week 4 (Sep. 13 – Sep. 19) ===
Date	Time (ET)	Visiting team	Home team	Site	Result	Attendance
September 13	7:00 p.m.	Winthrop	Charlotte	Transamerica Field • Charlotte, NC	**W** 5-0	750
September 13	7:00 p.m.	Saint Peter's	Temple	Temple Owls Sports Complex • Philadelphia, PA	**W** 3-1	397
September 13	8:00 p.m.	UNC Greensboro	SMU	Westcott Field • Dallas, TX	**T** 0-0	500
September 13	8:00 p.m.	Clemson	UAB	PNC Field • Birmingham, AL	**L** 0-2	934
September 16	7:00 p.m.	**Tulsa**	FIU	FIU Soccer Stadium • Westchester, FL	**FIU** 3-0	813
September 16	7:00 p.m.	**South Florida**	Florida Atlantic	FAU Soccer Stadium • Boca Raton, FL	**T** 1-1	513
September 17	7:00 p.m.	**UCF**	Temple	Temple Owls Sports Complex • Philadelphia, PA	**UCF** 4-0	424
September 17	7:00 p.m.	**UAB**	Charlotte	Transamerica Field • Charlotte, NC	**CLT** 3-0	931
September 17	8:00 p.m.	**SMU**	Memphis	Memphis Soccer & Track Stadium • Memphis, TN	**MEM** 1-0	219

Players of the Week

Offensive		Defensive	
Player	Team	Player	Team
Stephen Afrifa	FIU	Lasse Laursen	Charlotte

=== Week 5 (Sep. 20 – Sep. 26) ===
Date	Time (ET)	Visiting team	Home team	Site	Result	Attendance
September 20	7:00 p.m.	Central Arkansas	**Memphis**	Memphis Soccer & Track Stadium • Memphis, TN	**W** 6-4	314
September 20	7:00 p.m.	North Florida	**Florida Atlantic**	FAU Soccer Stadium • Boca Raton, FL	**L** 0-1	146
September 20	7:00 p.m.	**UAB**	Mercer	Betts Stadium • Macon, GA	**L** 2-3	327
September 20	8:00 p.m.	**Tulsa**	Missouri State	Betty & Bobby Allison South Stadium • Springfield, MO	**W** 3-0	493
September 21	7:00 p.m.	Coastal Carolina	**Charlotte**	Transamerica Field • Charlotte, NC	**W** 6-1	989
September 23	8:00 p.m.	**FIU**	**SMU**	Westcott Field • Dallas, TX	**SMU** 6-4	1,100
September 24	7:00 p.m.	**Temple**	**South Florida**	Corbett Stadium • Tampa, FL	**USF** 2-1	512
September 24	7:00 p.m.	**UAB**	**Florida Atlantic**	FAU Soccer Stadium • Boca Raton, FL	**FAU** 1-0	261
September 24	8:00 p.m.	**UCF**	**Memphis**	Memphis Soccer & Track Stadium • Memphis, TN	**MEM** 3-2	203
September 25	8:00 p.m.	**Charlotte**	**Tulsa**	Hurricane Soccer & Track Stadium • Tulsa, OK	**TUL** 2-0	417

Players of the Week

Offensive		Defensive	
Player	Team	Player	Team
Knut Ahlander	SMU	Henry Sach	Tulsa

=== Week 6 (Sep. 27 – Oct. 3) ===
Date	Time (ET)	Visiting team	Home team	Site	Result	Attendance
September 27	7:00 p.m.	FIU	VCU	Sports Backers Stadium • Richmond, VA	**W** 1-0	305
September 27	8:00 p.m.	Memphis	SIUE	Ralph Korte Stadium • Edwardsville, IL	**T** 1-1	245
September 30	8:00 p.m.	Temple	**SMU**	Westcott Field • Dallas, TX	**SMU** 4-1	650
September 30	8:00 p.m.	Tulsa	**UAB**	PNC Field • Birmingham, AL	**T** 0-0	123
October 1	6:00 p.m.	Florida Atlantic	**UCF**	UCF Soccer and Track Stadium • Orlando, FL	**FAU** 2-1	569
October 1	7:00 p.m.	Memphis	**FIU**	FIU Soccer Stadium • Westchester, FL	**FIU** 3-2	442

Players of the Week

Offensive		Defensive	
Player	Team	Player	Team
Fredrik Skilberg	SMU	Philip Hildebrandt	FIU

=== Week 7 (Oct. 4 – Oct. 10) ===
Date	Time (ET)	Visiting team	Home team	Site	Result	Attendance
October 5	7:00 p.m.	SMU	UCF	UCF Soccer and Track Stadium • Orlando, FL	**SMU** 2-1	193
October 5	7:00 p.m.	FIU	Temple	Temple Owls Sports Complex • Philadelphia, PA	**FIU** 3-0	132
October 5	8:00 p.m.	South Florida	UAB	PNC Field • Birmingham, AL	**T** 2-2	216
October 5	8:00 p.m.	Florida Atlantic	Tulsa	Hurricane Soccer & Track Stadium • Tulsa, OK	**TUL** 3-0	401
October 5	8:00 p.m.	Charlotte	Memphis	Memphis Soccer & Track Stadium • Memphis, TN	**T** 1-1	212
October 9	6:00 p.m.	UCF	FIU	FIU Soccer Stadium • Westchester, FL	**UCF** 3-1	476
October 9	7:00 p.m.	Tulsa	South Florida	Corbett Stadium • Tampa, FL	**USF** 2-1	383
October 9	7:00 p.m.	Charlotte	Florida Atlantic	FAU Soccer Stadium • Boca Raton, FL	**T** 2-2	211
October 9	8:00 p.m.	UAB	SMU	Westcott Field • Dallas, TX	**SMU** 1-0	350
October 9	8:00 p.m.	Memphis	Temple	Temple Owls Sports Complex • Philadelphia, PA	**MEM** 1-0	273

Players of the Week

Offensive		Defensive	
Player	Team	Player	Team
Lucca Dourado	UCF	Salvatore Mazzaferro	South Florida

=== Week 8 (Oct. 11 – Oct. 17) ===
Date	Time (ET)	Visiting team	Home team	Site	Result	Attendance
October 12	7:00 p.m.	Stetson	South Florida	Corbett Stadium • Tampa, FL	**L** 2-3	622
October 14	7:00 p.m.	**Temple**	Florida Atlantic	FAU Soccer Stadium • Boca Raton, FL	**TEM** 1-0	205
October 14	8:00 p.m.	**UCF**	UAB	PNC Field • Birmingham, AL	**UAB** 3-1	297
October 15	7:00 p.m.	**SMU**	Charlotte	Transamerica Field • Charlotte, NC	**CLT** 3-1	883
October 15	8:00 p.m.	**Memphis**	Tulsa	Hurricane Soccer & Track Stadium • Tulsa, OK	**TUL** 3-0	641
October 16	6:00 p.m.	**FIU**	South Florida	Corbett Stadium • Tampa, FL	**T** 3-3	417

Players of the Week

Offensive		Defensive	
Player	Team	Player	Team
Alvaro Torrijos	Tulsa	Mariano Fazio	Tulsa

=== Week 9 (Oct. 18 – Oct. 24) ===
Date	Time (ET)	Visiting team	Home team	Site	Result	Attendance
October 18	6:00 p.m.	**UAB**	Campbell	Eakes Athletics Complex • Buies Creek, NC	**T** 0-0	244
October 18	7:00 p.m.	**Florida Atlantic**	Florida Gulf Coast	FGCU Soccer Complex • Fort Myers, FL	**L** 1-2	270
October 18	7:00 p.m.	Stony Brook	**Temple**	Temple Owls Sports Complex • Philadelphia, PA	**W** 2-0	127
October 18	8:00 p.m.	Lipscomb	**Memphis**	Memphis Soccer & Track Stadium • Memphis, TN	**T** 1-1	352
October 21	7:00 p.m.	**Charlotte**	**UCF**	UCF Soccer and Track Stadium • Orlando, FL	**UCF** 2-1	564
October 21	8:00 p.m.	**South Florida**	**SMU**	Westcott Field • Dallas, TX	**SMU** 3-1	1,400
October 22	7:00 p.m.	**UAB**	**FIU**	FIU Soccer Stadium • Westchester, FL	**FIU** 2-1	659
October 22	7:00 p.m.	**Florida Atlantic**	**Memphis**	Memphis Soccer & Track Stadium • Memphis, TN	**MEM** 2-0	0
October 22	7:00 p.m.	**Tulsa**	**Temple**	Temple Owls Sports Complex • Philadelphia, PA	**TUL** 3-2	161

Players of the Week

Offensive		Defensive	
Player	Team	Player	Team
Gino Vivi	UCF	Cesar Sancho	Memphis

=== Week 10 (Oct. 25 – Nov. 2) ===
Date	Time (ET)	Visiting team	Home team	Site	Result	Attendance
October 25	7:00 p.m.	Florida Gulf Coast	FIU	FIU Soccer Stadium • Westchester, FL	**FIU** 3-2	452
October 25	7:00 p.m.	**South Florida**	Charlotte	Transamerica Field • Charlotte, NC	**USF** 2-1	1,249
October 28	7:00 p.m.	**SMU**	Florida Atlantic	FAU Soccer Stadium • Boca Raton, FL	**FAU** 2-1	465
October 28	7:00 p.m.	**FIU**	Charlotte	Transamerica Field • Charlotte, NC	**FIU** 3-2	801
October 28	7:00 p.m.	**Memphis**	South Florida	Corbett Stadium • Tampa, FL	**USF** 2-0	437
October 28	8:00 p.m.	**UCF**	Tulsa	Hurricane Soccer & Track Stadium • Tulsa, OK	**TUL** 1-0	595
October 28	8:00 p.m.	**Temple**	UAB	PNC Field • Birmingham, AL	**T** 1-1	212
November 2	7:00 p.m.	**South Florida**	UCF	UCF Soccer and Track Stadium • Orlando, FL	**USF** 2-1	788
November 2	7:00 p.m.	**Charlotte**	Temple	Temple Owls Sports Complex • Philadelphia, PA	**CLT** 5-1	237
November 2	7:00 p.m.	**Florida Atlantic**	FIU	FIU Soccer Stadium • Westchester, FL	**FIU** 1-0	1,115
November 2	8:00 p.m.	**UAB**	Memphis	Memphis Soccer & Track Stadium • Memphis, TN	**MEM** 2-0	247
November 2	8:00 p.m.	**Tulsa**	SMU	Westcott Field • Dallas, TX	**SMU** 3-2	1,600

Players of the Week

Offensive		Defensive	
Player	Team	Player	Team
Oscar Resano	South Florida	Wes Bottenburg	Tulsa

== Postseason ==
=== Conference tournament ===
2022 American Athletic Conference men's soccer tournament
- Classification: Division I
- Teams: 6
- Matches: 5
- First round site: Top Seed Campus Site
- Semifinals site: FIU Soccer Stadium; Westchester, FL
- Finals site: FIU Soccer Stadium; Westchester, FL
- Champions: FIU (1st title)
- Broadcast: ESPN+

The 2022 American Athletic Conference men's soccer tournament was held November 6–13. Seeding was determined by regular season conference record points per game. The tournament champion FIU Panthers earned the American Athletic Conference's automatic berth into the 2022 NCAA Division I men's soccer tournament.

First Round; November 6
3	South Florida	2
6	Charlotte	1
4	Tulsa	1
5	Memphis	2

Semifinals; November 10
2	SMU	0
3	South Florida	1
1	FIU	1
5	Memphis	0

Championship; November 13
1	FIU	2
3	South Florida	0

==== First Round ====
November 6, 2022	#3 South Florida Bulls	2–1	#6 Charlotte 49ers	Tampa, FL
6:00 PM EST	Ajmeer Spengler 31'; Oscar Resano 48'; Jackson Weyman (yellow card) 61'; Takeru Moriyama (yellow card) 67'	Report	Matthew Kirk 25'; Aboubacar Traore (yellow card) 37'; Luke Husakiwsky (yellow card) 59'; Yang Scofano (yellow card) 84'; Brigham Larsen (yellow card) 88'	Stadium: Corbett Stadium; Attendance: 429; Referee: Justin St Perre; Assistant referees: Corey Wilt; Rhett Hammil; Fourth official: Joseph Radzialowski

November 6, 2022	#4 Tulsa Golden Hurricane	1–2	#5 Memphis Tigers	Tulsa, OK
7:00 PM EST	Alex Meinhard 22'; Alex Lopez (yellow card) 50'	Report	Alberto Cruz 50'; Lineker Rodrigues dos Santos 99'; Jackson Kim (yellow card) 83'; Hayden Anderson (yellow card) 110'	Stadium: Hurricane Soccer & Track Stadium; Attendance: 361; Referee: Jose Carlos Rivero; Assistant referees: Ryan Starr; Brandon Queri; Fourth official: Sergio Ribeiro

==== Semifinals ====
November 10, 2022	#3 South Florida Bulls	1–0	#2 SMU Mustangs	Westchester, FL
4:00 PM EST	Alfred Perez 30' (pen.); Gabrielle Privitera (yellow card) 25'; Ajmeer Spengler (yellow card) 27'; Alfred Perez (yellow card) 45'; Jeffrey Cooper (yellow card) 75'; Josh Gomina (yellow card) 82'	Report	Owen Zarnick (yellow card) 17'; Kyra Chambron Pinho (yellow card) 41'; JP Jordan (yellow card) 48'	Stadium: FIU Soccer Stadium; Attendance: 0

November 10, 2022	#5 Memphis Tigers	0–1	#1 FIU Panthers	Westchester, FL
7:00 PM EST	Alberto Cruz (yellow card) 18'; Jovan Prado (yellow card) 90'; Lineker Rodrigues dos Santos (red card) 90'	Report	Stephen Afrifa 53'; Matthias Lavenant (yellow card) 80'; David Garcia (yellow card) 85'	Stadium: FIU Soccer Stadium; Attendance: 1,168

==== Final ====
November 13, 2022	#3 South Florida Bulls	0–2	#1 FIU Panthers	Westchester, FL
1:00 PM EST	Brian Schaefer (yellow card) 44'	Report	Bernardo Dos Santos Monteiro 25'; David Garcia 42'; Matteo Gasperoni (yellow card) 45'; Carlos Scheckermann (yellow card) 74'	Stadium: FIU Soccer Stadium; Attendance: 1,057

== Rankings ==
=== National rankings ===
	Improvement in ranking
	Drop in ranking
RV	Received votes but were not ranked in Top 25
NV	No votes received

		Pre	Wk 1	Wk 2	Wk 3	Wk 4	Wk 5	Wk 6	Wk 7	Wk 8	Wk 9	Wk 10	Wk 11	Wk 12	Wk 13	Wk 14	Wk 15	Wk 16	Final
Charlotte	USC	NV													None released				
Charlotte	TDS	NV	NV																
Charlotte	CSN	RV																	
Florida Atlantic	USC	NV													None released				
Florida Atlantic	TDS	NV	NV																
Florida Atlantic	CSN	NV																	
FIU	USC	18													None released				
FIU	TDS	23	NV																
FIU	CSN	18																	
Memphis	USC	NV													None released				
Memphis	TDS	NV	NV																
Memphis	CSN	NV																	
SMU	USC	NV													None released				
SMU	TDS	12	20																
SMU	CSN	NV																	
South Florida	USC	NV													None released				
South Florida	TDS	NV	NV																
South Florida	CSN	NV																	
Temple	USC	NV													None released				
Temple	TDS	NV	NV																
Temple	CSN	NV																	
Tulsa	USC	11													None released				
Tulsa	TDS	13	13																
Tulsa	CSN	12																	
UAB	USC	NV													None released				
UAB	TDS	NV	NV																
UAB	CSN	NV																	
UCF	USC	NV													None released				
UCF	TDS	NV	NV																
UCF	CSN	NV																	

=== Regional rankings - USC East Region ===
	Improvement in ranking
	Drop in ranking
RV	Received votes but were not ranked in Top 10
NV	No votes received

The United Soccer Coaches' East region ranks teams across the American Athletic, Big East, and MAAC.

	Wk 1	Wk 2	Wk 3	Wk 4	Wk 5	Wk 6	Wk 7	Wk 8	Wk 9	Wk 10	Wk 11	Wk 12
Charlotte												
Florida Atlantic												
FIU												
Memphis												
SMU												
South Florida												
Temple												
Tulsa												
UAB												
UCF												

== Awards and honors ==
=== Postseason honors ===
2022 AAC Men's Soccer Individual Awards
Award	Recipient(s)
Offensive Player of the Year	Knut Ahlander, SMU
Defensive Player of the Year	Mariano Fazio, Tulsa
Midfielder of the Year	Knut Ahlander, SMU
Goalkeeper of the Year	Alex Lopez, Tulsa
Rookie of the Year	Alexander Petræus, SMU
Coaching Staff of the Year	FIU

2022 AAC Men's Soccer All-Conference Teams
First Team Honorees	Second Team Honorees	All-Rookie Honorees
Kameron Lacey, Charlotte; Lucca Dourado, UCF; Anderson Rosa, UCF; Stephen Afrifa, FIU; Yushi Nagao, FIU; Knut Ahlander, SMU; Mads Westergren, SMU; Mariano Fazio, Tulsa; Alex Lopez, Tulsa; Alex Meinhard, Tulsa; Henry Sach, Tulsa	Jack Hudson, UAB; Sean Suber, Charlotte; Gino Vivi, UCF; Bernardo Dos Santos Monteiro, FIU; Carlos Scheckermann, FIU; Alberto Cruz, Memphis; Lineker Rodrigues dos Santos, Memphis; Colin Welsh, Memphis; Brian Schaefer, South Florida; Salvatore Mazzaferro, South Florida; JP Jordan, SMU; Alexander Petræus, SMU	Mathias Love Groth, UAB; Juanvi Muñoz, UCF; Brad Dildy, Charlotte; Samy Kolby, Charlotte; Andreas Raisanen, Florida Atlantic; Joao Domingues, FIU; Alberto Cruz, Memphis; Nikola Djordjevic, SMU; Alexander Petræus, SMU; Fredrik Skilberg, SMU; Draven Barnett, Temple; Wes Bottenburg, Tulsa

== MLS SuperDraft ==
=== Total picks by school ===
Team	Round 1	Round 2	Round 3	Total
Charlotte	–	1	1	2
Florida Atlantic	–	–	–	0
FIU	1	–	–	1
Memphis	–	–	–	0
SMU	–	–	–	0
South Florida	–	–	1	1
Temple	–	–	–	0
Tulsa	–	1	–	1
UAB	–	–	–	0
UCF	1	–	–	1
Total	2	2	2	6

=== List of selections ===
Round	Pick #	MLS team	Player	Position	College
1	8	Sporting Kansas City	(Canada) Stephen Afrifa	FW	FIU
1	23	LA Galaxy	(Costa Rica) Gino Vivi	FW	UCF
2	35	Nashville SC	(United States) Sean Suber	DF	Charlotte
2	49	Nashville SC	(Estonia) Alex Meinhard	FW	Tulsa
3	72	Austin FC	(Canada) Salvatore Mazzaferro	DF	South Florida
3	82	FC Dallas	(Jamaica) Kameron Lacey	FW	Charlotte
