= 2021 American Athletic Conference men's soccer tournament =

- Classification: Division I
- Teams: 4
- Matches: 3
- Site: Hurricane Soccer & Track Stadium; Tulsa, Oklahoma
- Champions: Tulsa (4th title)
- Winning coach: Tom McIntosh (4th title)
- MVP: Off: Gino Vivi (UCF); Def: Til Zinnhardt (Tulsa)

2021 American Athletic Conference men's soccer standings
| | Conf. | | | | | Overall |
| Team | W | | L | | T | W | | L | | T |
|---|---|---|---|---|---|---|---|---|---|---|
| No. 10 Tulsa ‡ | 8 | – | 1 | – | 1 | 15 | – | 1 | – | 1 |
| UCF | 6 | – | 4 | – | 0 | 9 | – | 8 | – | 0 |
| Memphis | 5 | – | 4 | – | 1 | 6 | – | 9 | – | 2 |
| SMU | 5 | – | 4 | – | 1 | 8 | – | 5 | – | 3 |
| South Florida | 4 | – | 5 | – | 1 | 6 | – | 7 | – | 2 |
| Temple | 0 | – | 10 | – | 0 | 2 | – | 12 | – | 2 |
‡ – 2021 American Tournament champion + – At-large invitation to the 2021 NCAA Tournament; As of November 14, 2021; Rankings from United Soccer Coaches; Source: The American

The 2021 American Athletic Conference men's soccer tournament was the ninth edition of the conference tournament, the annual college soccer championship contested by the members of the American Athletic Conference and guaranteed representative into the 2021 NCAA Division I men's soccer tournament. The tournament, hosted by Tulsa, began on November 10, 2021, and concluded on November 14, 2021.

== Format ==
The tournament took place in November 2021 and was contested by the top four teams in the regular season standing.

== Qualified teams ==
| Seed | Team | Appearance | Last appearance | Previous best performance | Previous NCAA appearance(s) (last) |
|---|---|---|---|---|---|
| 1 | Tulsa (hosts) | 5th | 2020 | Winners (2014, 2015, 2016) | 11 (2016) |
| 2 | UCF (title holders) | 9th | 2020 | Winners (2020) | 8 (2020) |
| 3 | Memphis | 6th | 2019 | Semifinals (2018) | 2 (2004) |
| 4 | SMU | 8th | 2020 | Winners (2017, 2018, 2019) | 33 (2019) |

== Bracket ==
Semifinals
1 | Tulsa | 2
4 | SMU | 0
2 | UCF | 6
3 | Memphis | 0

Finals
1 | Tulsa | 2
2 | UCF | 1

== Matches ==
=== Semifinals ===
| November 10, 2021 | UCF | 6–0 | Memphis | Tulsa, Oklahoma |
| 4:30 p.m. CST | Rainer De Jesus 4'; Gino Vivi 25', 59'; Lucca Dourado 28'; Nick Taylor 38'; Yanis Leerman 47' (pen.) | Report | | Stadium: Hurricane Soccer & Track Stadium |

| November 11, 2021 | Tulsa | 2–0 | SMU | Tulsa, Oklahoma |
| 4:00 p.m. CST | Tom Protzek 60'; Mariano Fazio 83' | Report | | Stadium: Hurricane Soccer & Track Stadium |

=== Final ===
| November 14, 2021 | Tulsa | 2–1 | UCF | Tulsa, Oklahoma |
| 12:00 p.m. CST | Alvaro Torrijos 32'; Marcos Moreno 82' | Report | Gino Vivi 57' | Stadium: Hurricane Soccer & Track Stadium |

=== Goalscorers ===
There were 11 goals scored in 3 matches, for an average of 3.67 goals per match.

3 goals

- (Costa Rica) Gino Vivi – UCF

1 goal

- (Spain) Mariano Fazio – Tulsa
- (United States) Marcos Moreno – Tulsa
- (Germany) Tom Protzek – Tulsa
- (Spain) Alvaro Torrijos – Tulsa
- (Brazil) Rainer De Jesus – UCF
- (Brazil) Lucca Dourado – UCF
- (France) Yanis Leerman – UCF
- (Cambodia) Nick Taylor – UCF

== All-Tournament team ==
| Player | Team |
|---|---|
| JP Jordan | SMU |
| Mads Westergren | SMU |
| Gino Vivi | UCF |
| Lucca Dourado | UCF |
| Rainer De Jesus | UCF |
| Yanis Leerman | UCF |
| Til Zinnhardt | Tulsa |
| Alvaro Torrijos | Tulsa |
| Mariano Fazio | Tulsa |
| Marcus Moreno | Tulsa |
| Mitchell Cashion | Tulsa |
