= 2026 American Conference men's soccer tournament =

- Classification: Division I
- Teams: 6
- Matches: 5
- Attendance: 3,298
- First round site: Top Seed Campus Site
- Semifinals site: Hurricane Soccer & Track Stadium; Tulsa, Oklahoma
- Finals site: Hurricane Soccer & Track Stadium; Tulsa, Oklahoma
- Champions: Tulsa (5th title)
- Winning coach: Tom McIntosh (5th title)
- MVP: Luc Achermann-Stanfield (Offensive); Jake Reich (Defensive) (Tulsa)
- Broadcast: ESPN+

2026 American Conference men's soccer standings
	Conf.					Overall
Team	W		L		T	W		L		T
Tulsa †	5	–	1	–	2	8	–	4	–	4
No. 16 Missouri State †	5	–	1	–	2	12	–	1	–	3
Charlotte	4	–	2	–	2	9	–	3	–	4
Florida Atlantic	3	–	2	–	3	6	–	3	–	7
Memphis	2	–	2	–	4	8	–	4	–	5
FIU	2	–	2	–	4	7	–	5	–	5
UAB	2	–	3	–	3	5	–	5	–	5
Temple	1	–	5	–	2	2	–	10	–	4
South Florida	0	–	6	–	2	2	–	12	–	3
† – Conference champion ‡ – American tournament champion + – At-large invitation to the 2026 NCAA tournament; As of November 6, 2026; Rankings from United Soccer Coaches; Source: The American

The 2026 American Conference men's soccer tournament was the postseason men's soccer tournament for the American Conference held from November 6 through November 14, 2026. The five-match tournament took place at campus sites, with the higher seed hosting while the Semifinals and Finals were hosted at Hurricane Soccer & Track Stadium in Tulsa, Oklahoma. The six-team single-elimination tournament consisted of three rounds based on seeding from regular season conference play. The defending champions were the Florida Atlantic Owls. Tulsa defeated Charlotte on penalty kicks to win their fifth American Conference tournament title. It was their tenth conference title overall. This was also the fifth American tournament title for head coach Tom McIntosh and his ninth conference title overall. As tournament champions, Tulsa earned the American Conference's automatic berth into the 2026 NCAA Division I men's soccer tournament.

== Seeding ==
The top six teams in the regular season earned a spot in the tournament, with the top two seeds receiving byes into the Semifinals. A tiebreaker was required to determine the first and second seeds in the tournament as Tulsa and Missouri State finished with identical 5–1–2 regular season conference records. Tulsa won their October 11th regular season match up 2–1 to gain the top seed. A tiebreaker was also required to determine the fifth and sixth seeds in the tournament as Memphis and FIU finished with identical 2–2–4 regular season conference records. The two teams drew their September 25th regular season match up 2–2. After further tiebreakers it was determined that Memphis was the fifth seed and FIU was the sixth seed.

Seed	School	Conference Record	Points
1	Tulsa	5–1–2	17
2	Missouri State	5–1–2	17
3	Charlotte	4–2–2	14
4	Florida Atlantic	3–2–3	12
5	Memphis	2–2–4	10
6	FIU	2–2–4	10

== Bracket ==
First Round; November 6
3	Charlotte (a.e.t)	4
6	FIU	3
4	Florida Atlantic	2
5	Memphis	5

Semifinals; November 11
2	Missouri State	0
3	Charlotte	3
1	Tulsa (a.e.t)	1
5	Memphis	0

Championship; November 14
3	Charlotte	0 (3)
1	Tulsa (pen.)	0 (4)

== Schedule ==
=== First Round ===
November 6, 2026	#3 Charlotte	4–3 (a.e.t.)	#6 FIU	Charlotte, NC
6:00 p.m. EST	Samuel Manufor (yellow card) 28'; Vilmer Brunskog (yellow card) 35'; Wiktor Pucilowski 37'; Diogo Fazenda (yellow card) 61'; Natsuki Ogata 70'; Larry Noel 88'; Michael Raggett 96' (pen.)	Report	(yellow card) 26' (goal) 48' (pen.), 59' Santi Possu; 51' Team; (yellow card) 78' Team; (yellow card) 86' Leonardo Consoloni; (yellow card) 96' Benjamin Watt	Stadium: Jen Gaber Field; Attendance: 447; Referee: Drew Klemp; Assistant referees: Chris Zuerner; John Rush; Fourth official: Kevin Maurer

November 6, 2026	#4 Florida Atlantic	2–5	#5 Memphis	Boca Raton, FL
7:00 p.m. EST	Emil Lausten (yellow card) 51'; Jaiden Paniagua 65'; Michel Tentchou 73'	Report	6', 36' Marko Stajnko; (yellow card) 16' Keanan Bader; 18' Renan Syrio; 63' Miller Lashlee; 66' Thomas Mancuso	Stadium: FAU Soccer Stadium; Attendance: 510; Referee: Elvis Osmanovic; Assistant referees: Carlos Morales-Lastra; Mauro Gonzalez

=== Semifinals ===
November 11, 2026	#2 Missouri State	0–3	#3 Charlotte	Tulsa, OK
3:30 p.m. CST	Raul Alvaro (yellow card) 90'	Report	(yellow card) 39' (goal) 84' Xavier Holloway; 52' Elias Arsvoll; 80' Michael Raggett	Stadium: Hurricane Soccer & Track Stadium; Attendance: 206; Referee: Daniel Radford; Assistant referees: Preston Joyner; Albert Franklin; Fourth official: Brandon Queri

November 11, 2026	#1 Tulsa	1–0 (a.e.t.)	#5 Memphis	Tulsa, OK
7:00 p.m. CST	Peleg Armendariz (yellow card) 63'; Druv Pareek (yellow card) 83'; Luc Achermann-Stanfield 110'	Report		Stadium: Hurricane Soccer & Track Stadium; Attendance: 1,026; Referee: Muhammad Kaleia; Assistant referees: Carson Alston; Brandon Sweetman; Fourth official: Will Franklin

=== Final ===
November 14, 2026	#1 Tulsa	0–0 (a.e.t.) (4–3 p)	#3 Charlotte	Tulsa, OK
3:00 p.m. CST	Quentin Christey (yellow card) 73'; Jared Aguilar (yellow card) 105'	Report	(yellow card) 79' Michael Raggett	Stadium: Hurricane Soccer & Track Stadium; Attendance: 1,109; Referee: Servando Berna; Assistant referees: Carlos Morales-Lastra; Chris Thresher; Fourth official: Rodrigo Albuquerque
	Penalties
	Will Applegate (penalty missed); Kgodiso Sukati (penalty scored); Dani Gamboa (penalty scored); Luc Achermann-Stanfield (penalty scored); Bruno Medina (penalty scored)		Michael Raggett (penalty scored); Diogo Fazenda (penalty missed); Larry Noel (penalty scored); Xavier Holloway (penalty scored); Diogo Veloso (penalty missed)

== Statistics ==
=== Goalscorers ===
There were 18 goals scored in 5 matches, for an average of 3.6 goals per match.

2 goals

- Santi Possu – FIU
- Michael Raggett – Charlotte
- Marko Stajnko – Memphis

1 goal

- Luc Achermann-Stanfield – Tulsa
- Elias Arsvoll – Charlotte
- Xavier Holloway – Charlotte
- Miller Lashlee – Memphis
- Thomas Mancuso – Memphis
- Larry Noel – Charlotte
- Natsuki Ogata – Charlotte
- Jaiden Paniagua – Florida Atlantic
- Wiktor Pucilowski – Charlotte
- Renan Syrio – Memphis
- Michel Tentchou – Florida Atlantic

== All-Tournament team ==
Player	Team
Michael Raggett	Charlotte
Wiktor Pucilowski	Charlotte
Xavier Holloway	Charlotte
Alex Svetanoff	Charlotte
Larry Noel	Charlotte
**Luc Achermann-Stanfield**	Tulsa
Carlito Saylon	Tulsa
Druv Pareek	Tulsa
Bruno Medina	Tulsa
Jake Reich	Tulsa
Miller Lashlee	Memphis

Offensive MVP in bold
Defensive MVP in italics
