= American Conference men's soccer tournament =

- Sport: College soccer
- Conference: American Conference
- Number of teams: 6
- Format: Single-elimination tournament
- Current stadium: Rotates; semifinals and final hosted by regular-season champion
- Played: 2013–present
- Last contest: 2026
- Current champion: Tulsa (5th title)
- Most championships: Tulsa (5 titles)
- TV partner: ESPN+
- Official website: theamerican.org/msoc

The American Conference men's soccer tournament is the conference championship tournament in soccer for the American Conference (American; known before the 2025 season as American Athletic Conference). The tournament has been held every year since the split from the Big East Conference in 2013. It is a single-elimination tournament and seeding is based on regular season records. The winner, declared conference champion, receives the conference's automatic bid to the NCAA Division I men's soccer championship.

== Format ==
Since the creation of the American in 2013, the tournament was structured as follows. The teams are seeded based on the order of finish in the conference's round robin regular season. Tiebreakers begin with the result of the head-to-head matchup. The teams are then placed in a single-elimination bracket, with the top seed playing the lowest seed, until meeting in a final championship game. After two overtime periods, ties are broken by shootout rounds, with the winner of the shootout advancing.

Opening round games are held at campus sites with the higher seed hosting, while the semifinals and final are held at a predetermined campus location, specifically the home field of the American's regular-season champion.

For the 2016 and 2017 seasons the tournament was reduced to just the top 4 teams in the conference. Since 2018, the tournament has featured the top 6 teams.

== Champions ==
=== Finals ===
Ed.	Year	Champion	Score	Runner-up	Venue	City	MOP (offense)	Ref.
1	2013	USF (1)	0–0 (6–5 p)	UConn	Toyota Stadium	Frisco, TX	Edwin Moalosi (USF)	
2	2014	Tulsa (1)	0–0 (6–5 p)	USF	Morrone Stadium	Storrs, CT	Abe Matamoros (Tulsa)	
3	2015	Tulsa (2)	1–1 (4–3 p)	UConn	Corbett Soccer Stadium	Tampa, FL	Lesley Nchanji (Tulsa)	
4	2016	Tulsa (3)	1–1 (4–2 p)	USF	Corbett Soccer Stadium	Tampa, FL	Juan Sánchez (Tulsa)	
5	2017	SMU (1)	2–1	UCF	Westcott Field	University Park, TX (Note: The stadium is in University Park, but has a Dallas mailing address.)	Emil Cuello (SMU)	
6	2018	SMU (2)	1–1 (5–4 p)	SMU	UCF Soccer Stadium	Orlando, FL (Note: The stadium has an Orlando mailing address, but is in unincorporated Orange County.)	Emil Cuello (SMU)	
7	2019	SMU (3)	1–0	UCF	UCF Soccer Stadium	Orlando, FL	Eddie Munjoma (SMU)	
8	2020	UCF (1)	1–0	Tulsa	UCF Soccer Stadium	Orlando, FL	Lucca Dourado (UCF)	
9	2021	Tulsa (4)	2–1	UCF	Hurricane Soccer Stadium	Tulsa, OK	Gino Vivi (UCF)	
10	2022	FIU (1)	2–0	USF	FIU Soccer Stadium	Westchester, FL (Note: The stadium has a Miami mailing address.)	Stephen Afrifa (FIU)	
11	2023	Charlotte (1)	2–1	SMU	Westcott Field	University Park, TX	Jelldirk Dallmann (SMU)	
12	2024	Charlotte (2)	2–1 (a.e.t.)	FIU	Billy Murphy Complex	Memphis, TN	Brighman Larsen (Charlotte)	
13	2025	Florida Atlantic (1)	3–2	FIU	Transamerica Field	Charlotte, NC	Mamadou Diarra (Florida Atlantic)	
14	2026	Tulsa (5)	0–0 (4–3 p)	Charlotte	Hurricane Soccer Stadium	Tulsa, OK	Luc Achermann-Stanfield (Tulsa)	

=== By school ===
As of 2026 tournament

School	App.	W	L	T	Pct.	Titles	Winning years
Charlotte	5	7	1	2	.800	2	2023, 2024
Cincinnati	3	0	3	0	.000	0	–
FIU	5	5	4	1	.550	1	2022
Florida Atlantic	4	3	3	0	.500	1	2025
Louisville	1	0	1	0	.000	0	–
Memphis	10	4	10	0	.286	0	–
Missouri State	2	0	2	0	.000	0	–
Rutgers	1	2	1	0	.667	0	–
SMU	10	8	5	3	.594	3	2017, 2018, 2019
South Florida	10	8	7	4	.526	1	2013
Temple	8	1	7	1	.167	0	–
Tulsa	8	7	3	7	.618	5	2014, 2015, 2016, 2021, 2026
UAB	0	0	0	0	–	0	–
UCF	9	6	6	3	.500	1	2020
UConn	7	6	4	3	.577	0	–

- Teams in italics no longer sponsor men's soccer in the American.
- Charlotte, FIU, Florida Atlantic, and UAB played their first American Conference seasons in 2022. Missouri State played its first American Conference season in 2025.
