= 1984 NCAA Division II soccer tournament =

1984 NCAA Division II Soccer Championship
Tournament details
- Country: United States
- Teams: 12

Final positions
- Champions: Florida International (2nd)
- Runners-up: Seattle Pacific

Tournament statistics
- Matches played: 11
- Goals scored: 40 (3.64 per match)
- Top goal scorer(s): (Zaire) M Eketebi, FIU (5)

The 1984 NCAA Division II Soccer Championship was the 13th annual tournament held by the NCAA to determine the top men's Division II college soccer program in the United States.

Florida International defeated defending champions Seattle Pacific in the final, 1–0 (after one overtime period), to win their second Division II national title. The Golden Panthers (14-4-3), who previously won in 1982, were coached by former NFL player Karl Kremser.

The final match was played on December 8 at Memorial Stadium in Seattle, Washington.

== Bracket ==
First Round; *Campus sites
Seattle Pacific	1
Oakland	0
Cal State Northridge	4
Cal State Hayward	3
New Haven	2
Bridgeport	1
Lock Haven	2
Gannon	0

Quarterfinals; *Campus sites
*	Davis & Elkins	1
Seattle Pacific	2
*	UM–Saint Louis	2
Cal State Northridge	1
*	Tampa	0
New Haven	1
*	Florida International	10
Lock Haven	1

Semifinals; *Campus sites
Seattle Pacific	2
UM–Saint Louis	1
New Haven	2
Florida International	3

Final; December 8, 1984; Seattle, WA
Seattle Pacific	0
Florida International	1(OT)

== Final ==
December 8, 1984

Seattle Pacific	0–1 (OT)	Florida International
	Report 1 Report 2	Troy Edwards 95:03' (Pinto)

Memorial Stadium, Seattle, Washington
Attendance: 4,500 (est.)

== See also ==
- NCAA Division I Men's Soccer Championship
- NCAA Division III Men's Soccer Championship
- NAIA Men's Soccer Championship
