= 2020 American Athletic Conference men's soccer season =

- League: NCAA Division I
- Sport: Soccer
- Duration: February – April 2021
- Teams: 8

2021 MLS SuperDraft
- Top draft pick: Nicky Hernandez, 15th overall
- Picked by: FC Dallas

Regular Season

Tournament
- Champions: UCF
- Runners-up: Tulsa
- Finals MVP: Off: Lucca Dourado (UCF); Def: Yannik Oettl (UCF)

AAC men's soccer seasons
- ← 2019 2021 →

2020 American Athletic Conference men's soccer standings
	Conf.					Overall
Team	W		L		T	W		L		T
No. 13 UCF ‡	7	–	3	–	0	9	–	4	–	1
Tulsa	6	–	3	–	1	6	–	4	–	2
Temple	5	–	4	–	1	5	–	4	–	2
SMU	5	–	5	–	0	5	–	5	–	1
South Florida	4	–	6	–	0	4	–	6	–	0
Memphis	2	–	8	–	0	2	–	8	–	0
Note: Due to COVID-19, the NCAA suspended the 2020 men's soccer season for fall ‡ – 2020 American Tournament champion + – Also invited to the 2020 NCAA Tournament; As of May 28, 2021; Rankings from United Soccer Coaches

The 2020 American Athletic Conference men's soccer season was the 8th season of men's varsity soccer in the conference. The season began in February 2021 and concluded in April 2021.

The season was originally scheduled to run from August 28, 2020, to November 6, 2020, but was postponed due to the COVID-19 pandemic.

UCF are the defending regular season champions and SMU are the defending tournament champions.

== Background ==
=== Previous season ===
The 2018 regular season was won by UCF, who finished conference play with a 5–1–1 record, and won on tiebreakers against SMU. SMU won the 2018 American Tournament, defeating UCF 5–4 in penalty kicks following a 1–1 draw in regulation and overtime. SMU earned the conference's automatic berth into the NCAA Tournament, while UCF and Connecticut received at-large berths into the tournament. In the NCAA Tournament, SMU lost in the first round to Oregon State. Connecticut beat rivals, Rhode Island, in the first round, before losing to Indiana in the second round. UCF was one of the 16 seeded teams (seeded 14th), allowing them to earn a bye into the second round. There, they lost in overtime to Lipscomb.

Following the season, Cal Jennings won the Offensive MVP award for the conference. Jacob Hauser-Ramsey of Connecticut won the Defensive MVP. Fellow UCF players, Louis Perez, Yannik Oettl, and Scott Calabrese won the AAC Midfielder, Goalkeeper, and Coach of the Year awards, respectively. Perez and Jennings were also named All-Americans by United Soccer Coaches.

Emil Cuello was the first AAC player to be drafted in the 2019 MLS SuperDraft, when he was selected by the LA Galaxy with the 19th overall pick in the first round of the draft.

=== Program changes ===
Two AAC programs, UConn and Cincinnati, departed prior to the 2020 season. UConn left for the Big East Conference, and Cincinnati disbanded their men's soccer program due to the ongoing COVID-19 pandemic.

== Head coaches ==
As of 2018 season

Team	Head coach	Previous job	Years at school	Overall record	Record at school	American record	NCAA Tournaments	NCAA College Cups	NCAA Titles
Memphis	Richard Mulrooney	Memphis (asst.)	6	32–39–15 (.459)	32–39–15 (.459)	13–24–8 (.378)	0	0	0
SMU	Kevin Hudson	SMU (asst.)	5	48–19–9 (.691)	48–19–9 (.691)	19–6–4 (.724)	3	0	0
South Florida	Bob Butehorn	Florida Gulf Coast	3	142–108–33 (.560)	13–14–6 (.485)	7–4–4 (.600)	4	0	0
Temple	Brian Rowland	Maryland (asst.)	2	5–10–4 (.368)	5–10–4 (.368)	2–4–1 (.357)	0	0	0
Tulsa	Tom McIntosh	Tulsa (asst.)	23	250–173–50 (.581)	250–173–50 (.581)	17–16–4 (.514)	10	0	0
UCF	Scott Calabrese	FIU	3	106–76–25 (.572)	21–9–5 (.671)	9–3–2 (.714)	4	0	0

== Preseason ==
=== Preseason poll ===
The preseason poll was released on January 25, 2021. SMU was picked to the win the conference.

	Team ranking	First place votes	Raw points
1.	SMU	5	25
2.	UCF	1	21
3.	South Florida	0	17
4.	Memphis	0	10
4.	Temple	0	10
6.	Tulsa	0	7

=== Preseason national rankings ===
The preseason national rankings are normally announced in August. United Soccer Coaches, Soccer America, and TopDrawerSoccer.com delayed their Top-25 preseason poll to the start of the spring season. CollegeSoccerNews.com did a Top-30 preseason poll in September 2020. TopDrawer Soccer, Soccer America, and United Soccer Coaches released their rankings in February 2021.

	United; Soccer	CSN	Soccer; America	TopDrawer; Soccer
Memphis	—	—	—	—
SMU	—	5	—	8
South Florida	—	—	—	—
Temple	—	—	—	—
Tulsa	—	—	—	—
UCF	—	8	—	10

=== Preseason All-Conference teams ===
Honor	Recipient
Preseason Offensive Player of the Year	Gabriel Costa, SMU
Preseason Defensive Player of the Year	Pierre Cayet, Temple
Preseason Goalkeeper of the Year	Yannik Oettl, UCF

Preseason All-AAC Team

2020 AAC Men's Soccer Preseason All-AAC Teams
First Team
- Yanis Leerman – UCF (Note: Unanimous selection)
- Yannik Oettl – UCF
- Louis Perez – UCF
- Yoni Sorokin – UCF
- Gino Vivi – UCF
- Peter Chang – Memphis
- Gurman Sangha – Memphis
- Gabriel Costa – SMU
- Knut Ahlander – SMU
- Avionne Flanagan – USF
- Pierre Cayet – Temple
- Sean Karani – Temple
- Mitchell Cashion – Tulsa

== MLS SuperDraft ==
=== Total picks by school ===
Team	Round 1	Round 2	Round 3	Round 4	Total
Memphis	0	0	0	0	0
SMU	1	0	0	0	1
South Florida	0	0	0	0	0
Temple	1	0	0	0	1
Tulsa	0	0	0	0	0
UCF	1	1	0	0	2

=== List of selections ===
Round	Pick #	MLS team	Player	Position	College	Ref.
1	8	Houston Dynamo	Garrett McLaughlin	FW	SMU	
1	17	FC Dallas	Cal Jennings	FW	UCF	
1	20	Real Salt Lake	Dayonn Harris	MF	UConn	
1	21	D.C. United	Simon Lefebvre	GK	Temple	
2	39	Orlando City	Jonathan Dean	DF	UCF	

=== Homegrown contracts ===
The Homegrown Player Rule is a Major League Soccer program that allows MLS teams to sign local players from their own development academies directly to MLS first team rosters. Before the creation of the rule in 2008, every player entering Major League Soccer had to be assigned through one of the existing MLS player allocation processes, such as the MLS SuperDraft.

To place a player on its homegrown player list, making him eligible to sign as a homegrown player, players must have resided in that club's home territory and participated in the club's youth development system for at least one year. Players can play college soccer and still be eligible to sign a homegrown contract.

Original MLS team	Player	Position	College	Ref.
FC Dallas	Eddie Munjoma	DF	SMU	
