= Atlantic Soccer Conference tournament =

Atlantic Soccer Conference tournament (defunct)
- Conference soccer championship
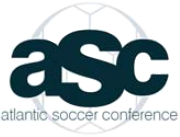
- Sport: College soccer
- Conference: Atlantic Soccer Conference
- Number of teams: 4
- Format: Single-elimination
- Played: 2006–2011
- Current champion: Longwood (2011)
- Most championships: Adelphi (3)

The Atlantic Soccer Conference tournament was the conference championship tournament in men's soccer for the Atlantic Soccer Conference. The tournament was held annually between 2006 and 2011. The conference disbanded when its membership dwindled to three members.

== Champions ==
=== Finals ===
Keys

- (1) title number
- a.e.t. – Match went to extra time
- p – Match decided by a penalty shootout after extra time

Ed.	Year	Champion	Score	Runner-up	Venue	City	Tournament MVP
1	2006	Adelphi (1)	3–2	Florida Atlantic	Motamed Field	Garden City, NY	Ron Foreman, Adelphi
2	2007	Florida Atlantic (1)	1–1 (8–7 p)	Longwood	LU Athletics Complex	Farmville, VA	Phillip Lamarre, FAU
3	2008	Longwood (1)	1–0	Adelphi	LU Athletics Complex	Farmville, VA	Martin Vickerton, Longwood
4	2009	Adelphi (2)	2–1	Longwood	LU Athletics Complex	Farmville, VA	Issa Tall, Adelphi
5	2010	Adelphi (3)	2–1 (a.e.t.)	Houston Baptist	Motamed Field	Garden City, NY	Dan Larenius, Adelphi
6	2011	Longwood (2)	0–0 (5–4 p)	Adelphi	Motamed Field	Garden City, NY	Joel Helmick, Longwood
