= American Football Conference (disambiguation) =

American Football Conference most commonly refers to one of two conferences in the National Football League.

American Football Conference may also refer to:

- All-America Football Conference, professional American football league operating from 1946 to 1949
- American Football Conference (1959–1961), a low-level American football minor league that operated between 1959 and 1961

== See also ==
- American Conference (disambiguation)
