= Getman =

Getman is a surname. Notable people with the surname include:

- Andrei Getman (1903–1987), Soviet military commander
- İqor Getman (born 1971), Azerbaijani soccer coach and former player
- Julius Getman (born 1931), American law professor and labor historian
- Mike Getman (born c. 1959), American soccer player and collegiate coach
- Nikolai Getman (1917–2004), Soviet painter

== See also ==
- Hetman, a historical political and military title in Central and Eastern Europe
