= Petraeus (disambiguation) =

David Petraeus (born 1952) is a retired United States Army general.

Petraeus may also refer to:

== Mythology ==
- Petraeus (mythology)

== People ==
- Aeschillus Petraeus (1593–1657), Bishop of Turku in 1652–1657
- Alexander Petræus (born 2002), Danish footballer
- Heinrich Petraeus (1589–1620), German physician and writer
- Holly Petraeus (born 1952), wife of David Petraeus
