= 2015 Tulsa Golden Hurricane men's soccer team =

American college soccer season

2015 Tulsa Golden Hurricane men's soccer

AAC tournament champions

NCAA, 2nd Round
- Conference: American Athletic Conference
- Record: 8–6–7 (3–3–2 The American)
- Head coach: Tom McIntosh (21st season)
- Assistant coaches: Justin Cook (9th season); Ryan Pore (3rd season); Daniel Cherbonnier (3rd season)
- Home stadium: Hurricane Soccer & Track Stadium

2015 American Athletic Conference men's soccer standings
	Conf.					Overall
Team	W		L		T	W		L		T
No. 11 SMU +	7	–	0	–	1	15	–	3	–	4
No. 15 South Florida +	5	–	1	–	2	11	–	6	–	3
Connecticut +	3	–	3	–	2	10	–	6	–	6
Tulsa ‡	3	–	3	–	2	8	–	6	–	7
UCF	3	–	4	–	1	7	–	8	–	2
Temple	2	–	6	–	0	10	–	7	–	2
Cincinnati	1	–	4	–	3	7	–	9	–	3
Memphis	1	–	4	–	3	3	–	10	–	4
‡ - Tournament champion +- Invited to the NCAA Division I Men's Soccer Championship; As of November 29, 2015; Rankings from NSCAA

The 2015 Tulsa Golden Hurricane men's soccer team represented the University of Tulsa during the 2015 NCAA Division I men's soccer season. It was the program's 36th season.

== Roster ==
Note: Flags indicate national team as defined under FIFA eligibility rules; some limited exceptions apply. Players may hold more than one non-FIFA nationality.

No.	Pos.	Nation	Player
0	GK	USA	Marcel Da Silva
1	GK	USA	Jake McGuire
2	DF	CAN	Quinton Duncan
3	DF	JAM	Adrian Smart
4	DF	USA	Cole Poppen
5	DF	USA	Jordan Speed
6	MF	USA	Geoffrey Dee
7	FW	USA	Miguel Velasquez
8	DF	USA	Dillon Alexander
9	FW	CAN	Aymar Sigue
10	FW	USA	Juan Sanchez
11	MF	CMR	Lesley Nchanji
12	DF	USA	Keegan King
13	MF	USA	Cameron Drackett
14	MF	ZIM	Munashe Raranje

No.	Pos.	Nation	Player
15	MF	USA	Rollie Rocha
16	MF	NED	Kay Duit
17	MF	USA	Zach Jackson
18	DF	USA	Michael Mitrik
19	FW	USA	Khalil Kirksey
20	MF	USA	Tony Doellefeld
21	DF	USA	Kurt Gerteisen
22	DF	USA	Bradley Bourgeois
23	DF	USA	Zack Stavrou
24	MF	USA	Jacob Gooden
25	MF	USA	Ray Saari
26	GK	USA	Kyle Daledovich
27	GK	USA	Brandon Hanat
28	MF	USA	Fred Mattioli
30	GK	USA	Matt Karasinski

== Schedule ==
=== Exhibition ===
August 21, 2015	Tulsa	2–1	Missouri State	Tulsa, Oklahoma
5:00 p.m.	Speed 51'; Velasquez 84'	Report	Lewis 67'	Stadium: Hurricane Stadium

=== Regular season ===
August 28, 2015	Tulsa	0–1 (a.e.t.)	#22 Saint Louis	Tulsa, Oklahoma
8:15 p.m.		Report	Cicciarelli 102'	Stadium: Hurricane Stadium; Attendance: 956

August 30, 2015	Tulsa	2–1	Sacramento State	Tulsa, Oklahoma
7:00 p.m.	Velasquez 7'; Dee 20' (pen.)	Report	Sandoval 22'	Stadium: Hurricane Stadium; Attendance: 131

September 4, 2015	#2 Virginia	1–1 (a.e.t.)	Tulsa	Charlottesville, Virginia
7:00 p.m.	Lennon 49'	Report	Duit 68'	Stadium: Klöckner Stadium; Attendance: 1,540

September 6, 2015	#4 North Carolina	2–1	Tulsa	Chapel Hill, North Carolina
7:00 p.m.	Wright 13'; Hume 41'	Report	Jackson 43'	Stadium: Fetzer Field; Attendance: 836

September 10, 2015	Tulsa	6–2	Oral Roberts	Tulsa, Oklahoma
7:00 p.m.	Drackett 18', 42'; Bourgeois 38'; Sanchez 68'; Saari 73' (pen.); Sigue 81'	Report	Derennes 33'; Haskin 81'	Stadium: Hurricane Stadium; Attendance: 408

September 13, 2015	Tulsa	3–2 (a.e.t.)	Portland	Tulsa, Oklahoma
1:00 p.m.	Bourgeois 59'; Velasquez 88'; Sanchez 97'	Report	Edwardson 41', 80'	Stadium: Hurricane Stadium; Attendance: 113

September 19, 2015	#1 Creighton	1–0	Tulsa	Omaha, Nebraska
7:00 p.m.	Perez 46'	Report		Stadium: Morrison Stadium; Attendance: 6,453

September 21, 2015	UMKC	2–3 (a.e.t.)	Tulsa	Kansas City, Missouri
7:00 p.m.	Smylie 12'; Popgeorgiev 40'	Report	Poppen 41'; Sanchez 82' 93'	Stadium: Durwood Stadium; Attendance: 532

September 26, 2015 Rivalry	Tulsa	0–1	SMU	Tulsa, Oklahoma
7:00 p.m.		Report	Lee 7'	Stadium: Hurricane Stadium; Attendance: 561

October 3, 2015	Cincinnati	1–1 (a.e.t.)	Tulsa	Cincinnati, Ohio
6:00 p.m.	Hay 49'	Report	Dee 13'	Stadium: Getter Stadium; Attendance: 821

October 7, 2015	Tulsa	1–2	#18 South Florida	Tulsa, Oklahoma
7:00 p.m.	Sanchez 20'	Report	Carlsson 17'; Bartman 81'	Stadium: Hurricane Stadium; Attendance: 375

October 10, 2015	UCF	0–1	Tulsa	Orlando, Florida
12:00 p.m.		Report	Nchanji 12'	Stadium: UCF Soccer Complex; Attendance: 370

October 17, 2015	Tulsa	2–0	Temple	Tulsa, Oklahoma
7:00 p.m.	Mitrik 71'; Jackson 82'	Report		Stadium: Hurricane Stadium; Attendance: 605

October 21, 2015	#12 SMU	3–2	Tulsa	Dallas, Texas
7:00 p.m.	Garcia 1'; Camara 35', 47'	Report	Bourgeois 67'; Dee 90' (pen.)	Stadium: Westcott Field; Attendance: 712

October 24, 2015	Tulsa	1–1 (a.e.t.)	Connecticut	Tulsa, Oklahoma
6:00 p.m.	Dee 46'	Report	Thiam 90'	Stadium: Hurricane Stadium; Attendance: 613

October 31, 2015	Memphis	0–3	Tulsa	Memphis, Tennessee
1:00 p.m.		Report	Alexander 30'; Sanchez 58'; Mitrik 76'	Stadium: Mike Rose Soccer Complex; Attendance: 137

=== AAC tournament ===
November 7, 2015 QF	Tulsa	2–2 (a.e.t.) (4–2 p)	UCF	Tulsa, Oklahoma
6:00 p.m.	Nchanji 51'; Mitrik 81'	Report	Barry 28', 53'	Stadium: Hurricane Stadium; Attendance: 482
	Penalties
	Stavrou (penalty scored); Saari (penalty scored); Dee (penalty scored); Poppen (penalty scored)		(penalty missed) Pyysalo; (penalty missed) Dawkins; (penalty scored) Barry; (penalty scored) Basic

November 13, 2015 SF / Rivalry	Tulsa	2–2 (a.e.t.) (4–3 p)	#7 SMU	Tampa, Florida
4:30 p.m.	Dee 21' (pen.); Bourgeois 62'	Report	Camara 42' (pen.); Rice 88'	Stadium: USF Soccer Stadium
	Penalties
	Velasquez (penalty scored); Poppen (penalty missed); Dee (penalty scored); Stavrou (penalty scored); Saari (penalty scored)		(penalty missed) Lujano; (penalty scored) Camara; (penalty scored) Cichero; (penalty scored) Rice; (penalty missed) Nelson

November 15, 2015 F	Tulsa	1–1 (a.e.t.) (4–3 p)	Connecticut	Tampa, Florida
2:00 p.m.	Velasquez 42'	Report	Leeman 3'	Stadium: USF Soccer Stadium; Attendance: 212
	Penalties
	Poppen (penalty missed); Velasquez (penalty scored); Dee (penalty scored); Saari (penalty missed); Stavrou (penalty scored); Mitrik (penalty scored)		(penalty scored) Thiam; (penalty scored) Brems; (penalty missed) Jonsson; (penalty scored) Richards; (penalty missed) Brown; (penalty missed) Awuah

=== NCAA tournament ===
November 19, 2015	Tulsa	3–2 (a.e.t.)	#16 FIU	Tulsa, Oklahoma
7:00 p.m.	Sanchez 52'; Dee 56'; Velasquez 95'	Report	Betancur 17'; Fountain 82'	Stadium: Hurricane Stadium; Attendance: 482

November 22, 2015	#8 Notre Dame	1–1 (a.e.t.) (3–0 p)	Tulsa	Notre Dame, Indiana
2:00 p.m.	Farina 24'	Report	Sanchez 62'	Stadium: Alumni Stadium; Attendance: 222
	Penalties
	Hodan (penalty scored); Aubrey (penalty missed); Gallagher (penalty scored); Lachowecki (penalty scored)		(penalty missed) Velasquez; (penalty missed) Duit; (penalty missed) Dee
