= Karl Kremser =

German gridiron football player and soccer coach (born 1945)

No. 15
- Position: Placekicker

Personal information
- Born: 3 August 1945 (age 81); Salzwedel, Soviet occupation zone of Germany
- Listed height: 6 ft 0 in (1.83 m)
- Listed weight: 175 lb (79 kg)

Career information
- High school: Levittown (PA) Woodrow Wilson
- College: Army (1964-1965); Tennessee (1967-1968)
- NFL draft: 1969: 5th round, 128th overall pick

Career history
- Miami Dolphins (1969–1970); Orlando Panthers (1970)

Awards and highlights
- Second-team All-SEC (1967)

Career NFL/AFL statistics
- Field goals: 13
- Field goal attempts: 23
- Field goal %: 56.5
- Longest field goal: 39
- Stats at Pro Football Reference

Karl Kremser
Personal information
- Full name: Karl Friedrich Kremser
- Height: 6 ft 0 in (1.83 m)

Youth career
- 1960–1964: Woodrow Wilson High School

College career
Years	Team	Apps	(Gls)
1964–1966	Army Cadets		

Managerial career
- 1970–1975: Palm Springs Junior High
- 1975–1977: Miami Killian High School
- 1977–1979: Davidson Wildcats
- 1980–2007: FIU Panthers

Karl Friedrich Kremser (born 3 August 1945) is a German American former football placekicker for the Miami Dolphins of the National Football League (NFL) and retired college soccer coach from Florida International University. He played college soccer for the United States Military Academy and college football for the University of Tennessee. He was chosen by the Miami Dolphins in the fifth round of the 1969 NFL/AFL draft.

== Early life ==
Kremser was born in Salzwedel in the Soviet occupation zone of Germany shortly after the end of World War II to Reichsdeutsche parents born in Latvia. His father was drafted into the German Army and fought on the Russian front. While his father was in the army, Kremser's family fled to Germany, to avoid the incoming Red Army. Until his family emigrated to Seabrook Farms, New Jersey in 1952, Kremser lived in Germany as a war refugee. Seabrook Farms was a truck farming area and pioneer of the frozen vegetable industry, which gave factory jobs and immigration support in exchange for one year of work. After Kremser's father finished his contract at Seabrook Farms, he found a new job and relocated the family to Levittown, Pennsylvania. Kremser attended the local Woodrow Wilson High School, where he excelled in track and soccer, graduating in 1964.

== College career ==
Kremser was recruited by West Point for track, but also played soccer where he led the Black Knights to the final four of the 1965 NCAA Tournament. Unable to adjust to the cadet lifestyle, Kremser left after two years, in search of another school. After reading a Spring 1966 Sports Illustrated article about Richmond Flowers, Kremser wrote to University of Tennessee track and field coach Chuck Rohe. Coach Rohe wrote back and the two arranged to meet during an AAU event. Unable to offer Kremser a scholarship, Coach Rohe instead arranged a work-study place, and Kremser transferred in 1966.

Since Tennessee did not have a soccer team, and inspired by Charlie and Pete Gogolak's innovative soccer-style placekicking, Kremser began practicing. Word spread about his talent, and he was encouraged to try out for spring football. Kremser was soon offered a full football scholarship, and may have been the first non-recruited dual sports athlete at Tennessee. The highlight of his collegiate football career came with a 54-yard field goal that helped the Volunteers defeat Alabama, 10–9, in 1968. The kick set a Southeastern Conference record for distance, and still ranks among the longest field goals in Tennessee history.

Kremser was an accomplished high jumper for the Tennessee Volunteers track and field team, placing runner-up in the high jump at the 1968 NCAA Division I Outdoor Track and Field Championships.

== NFL ==
After graduation, Kremser was drafted by the Miami Dolphins, in the fifth round of the 1969 NFL/AFL draft, and became the team's leading scorer in his rookie season. The following year, George Wilson was replaced by Don Shula, who brought in Garo Yepremian. Shula initially kept both kickers, with Yepremian on the taxi squad, but after one game, Yepremian was promoted to the active roster and Kremser was released. Upon being released, Kremser started teaching physical education at Palm Springs Junior High, while looking for a new team. He signed with Green Bay for pre-season, but the day before leaving for camp, he injured his quad during practice. It was then that Kremser decided to end his football career.

== Coaching career ==
In retirement, Kremser returned to Palm Springs Junior High. The school system had a soccer competition for junior high schools, and thereafter Kremser organized teams for tournaments. Kremser moved on to Miami Killian High School in 1975, where he taught German and coached soccer. He led the team to a state championship in 1977.

In 1977, Kremser joined the Davidson College Wildcats, and built their soccer program while also coaching track. By his third season, the Wildcats had five players named All-Southern Conference, with Kremser named Coach of the Year.

=== FIU Panthers ===
From 1980 to 2007, Kremser coached the Florida International University Panthers. During 27 years at FIU, Kremser was able to greatly develop its program, from a small Division II unknown to a respected Division I program. He guided two NCAA Division II Men's Soccer Championship teams at FIU, in 1982 and 1984, and three others reached the national finals, including his 1996 team that played for the NCAA Division I Men's Soccer Championship against St. John's. The two championships won in 1982 and 1984 remain FIU's only national championships in any sport. Kremser led FIU to eight Division II and eight Division I tournament appearances, while winning the 1991 Trans America Athletic Conference tournament. FIU also won the Atlantic Soccer Conference regular season championship in 2000, 2002, 2003 and 2004.

Among many honors and achievements, Kremser was named Florida's Coach of the Year in 1980, and the Collegiate Coaches' South Region Coach of the Year in 1985. He was selected Trans America Athletic Conference Coach of the Year in 1991, when he guided the Panthers to their first conference crown and NCAA Division I Tournament appearance. Kremser was voted TAAC Coach of the Year in 1996, and picked up Atlantic Soccer Conference Coach of the Year honors in 2002 and 2004 – FIU's final season with the league.

Kremser has coached 32 all-state selections, including five state Players of the Year, 34 All-South Region selections and eight All-Americans. Forty of his players turned professional, including former U.S. National Team player Robin Fraser, 1996 MLS Rookie of the Year and former U.S. National Team member Steve Ralston, Chris Antonopoulos, Fort Lauderdale Strikers (APSL) and U.S. National Team for beach soccer as both player and assistant coach, 2003 and 2005 MLS All-Star Tyrone Marshall, 2005 MLS All-Star Greg Vanney, 2006 MLS All-Star, Defensive Player of the Year and member of the Radio Shack Best XI Bobby Boswell, goalkeeper Jeff Cassar (FIU's first player to appear in the English Premier League).

Kremser briefly retired as FIU coach in 2002, after its soccer program was closed in favor of a new football program. The decision was reversed the next day, following alumni protest. Kremser remained at FIU for five more years, before leaving his post in 2007. Kremser's assistant coach and former FIU three time All-American, Munga Eketebi, took over.

Kremser left FIU as the 17th most successful coach in NCAA Division I men's soccer history, with a 337–210–41 career record. He posted a 324–171–41 mark at FIU, guiding the Panthers to 24 winning seasons. His teams recorded 10-or-more-victories 14 times in his final 17 years.

In 2025, Kremser was inducted into the FIU Athletics Hall of Fame as part of the second induction class, recognized for building the men's soccer program into a national powerhouse and being the only FIU coach to win national championships.
