= Kyle Russell (soccer) =

American college soccer coach

Current position
- Title: Head coach
- Team: FIU
- Conference: American
- Record: 52–33–18

Biographical details
- Born: c. 1987 (age 38–39); East Lansing, Michigan, U.S.
- Education: Coastal Carolina University (B.S., business management, 2009; MBA, 2014)

Playing career
- 2005–2008: Coastal Carolina
- Position: Defender

Coaching career (HC unless noted)
- 2009: Coastal Carolina (student volunteer asst.)
- 2010–2014: Coastal Carolina (assistant)
- 2015–2019: Coastal Carolina (associate HC)
- 2020–present: FIU

Head coaching record
- Overall: 52–33–18

Accomplishments and honors

Championships
- 1 CUSA regular season (2021); 1 AAC regular season (2022); 1 AAC tournament (2022)

Awards
- CUSA Coach of the Year (2021); United Soccer Coaches NCAA D-I East Region Staff of the Year (2022); American Athletic Conference Coaching Staff of the Year (2022)

Kyle Russell is an American College soccer coach. He is the current head coach of the FIU Panthers men's soccer team at Florida International University (FIU), a position he has held since February 2020.

== Playing career ==
Russell played college soccer as a defender for the Coastal Carolina Chanticleers from 2005 to 2008, starting in 74 matches (eighth-most in program history). He participated in the 2009 Major League Soccer Combine and played professionally in the USL with teams including the Charleston Battery, Real Maryland, and Charlotte Eagles before a foot injury ended his playing career.

== Coaching career ==
=== Coastal Carolina (2009–2019) ===
Russell began his coaching career in 2009 as a student volunteer assistant coach at Coastal Carolina under head coach Shaun Docking. During the 2009 season, the Chanticleers posted a 9–2–7 overall record (5–0–3 in conference) and won the Big South Conference regular-season title.

Russell was promoted to full assistant coach from 2010 to 2014, serving as recruiting coordinator, scout, and defensive coordinator. In this period, the team contributed to high national win totals, co-leading the NCAA with 85 wins from 2010–2014. The Chanticleers won seven Big South titles (three regular-season in 2011, 2012, 2013; three tournament in 2010, 2013, 2014), made five NCAA Tournament appearances with six victories, and achieved top-25 national rankings in four consecutive seasons (2011–2014), peaking at No. 5 in 2013. Defensively, the team ranked in the top 20% of the NCAA in goals-against average and shutouts each year, recording 48 shutouts from 2010–2014. Russell coached four consecutive Big South Defensive Players of the Year (2010–2014) and 12 All-Big South defensive honorees. He also recruited three All-Americans: Ashton Bennett (2011, 2012), Pedro Ribeiro (2011, 2013), and Shawn McLaws (2014; the first Chanticleer defender All-American since 1992).

Russell was promoted to associate head coach—the first in program history—from 2015 to 2019. During this tenure, the Chanticleers posted a 59–35–18 overall record (18–7–3 in conference), won five Sun Belt Conference titles (two regular-season in 2016 and 2017; three tournament in 2016, 2017, 2019), made four NCAA Tournament appearances with five victories (including a Second Round berth in 2019), and achieved the program's highest national ranking of No. 4 in 2015 (by both College Soccer News and NSCAA). Recruiting successes continued with NSCAA All-Region performers such as Justin Portillo, Uchenna Uzo, Ricky Garbanzo, Matt Risher, and Ridge Robinson.

Over his full 10-year tenure at Coastal Carolina (2009–2019), the team compiled a 147–66–27 overall record (63–11–8 in conference), won 12 total conference championships, and made nine NCAA Tournament appearances. Russell also served as recruiting director during much of this period.

=== FIU (2020–present) ===
Russell was named head coach of the FIU Panthers men's soccer team on February 21, 2020, becoming the eighth head coach in program history. His first season (2020) was shortened and postponed due to the COVID-19 pandemic, resulting in a 4–4–1 record.

In 2021, FIU won the Conference USA regular-season title with an undefeated 7–0–1 conference record (12–2–2 overall), earned the program's 11th NCAA Tournament appearance (Round of 32), and defeated the No. 1-ranked team (Marshall) for the first time in program history. The team rose as high as No. 12 nationally and appeared in the Top 25 for 10 consecutive weeks. Russell was named Conference USA Coach of the Year.

In 2022, FIU's first season in the AAC, the team won both the regular-season and tournament titles (14–5–1 overall), reached the NCAA Sweet 16 (third round), and defeated multiple top-ranked opponents (including No. 10 Tulsa and No. 13 North Carolina). His staff received United Soccer Coaches NCAA D-I East Region Staff of the Year and AAC Coaching Staff of the Year honors.

The team achieved three consecutive 10+ win seasons from 2021–2023, advanced to the NCAA Tournament second round in 2023, and reached the AAC Championship match in 2024 and 2025 (third appearance in four seasons). As of the start of the 2026 season, Russell has a 30–13–4 overall record at FIU through 2025. He is recruiting with TopDrawerSoccer top-30 classes in 2020 and 2021 and produced MLS draft picks (e.g., Stephen Afrifa, 8th overall in 2022; Michael Appiah in 2025).

His contract has been extended through 2027.

== Personal life ==
Russell was born in East Lansing, Michigan, and raised in the suburbs of Chicago. He earned a B.S. in business management (2009) and an MBA (2014) from Coastal Carolina University. He married Monica in 2013 and has two sons.
