= 2015 UConn Huskies men's soccer team =

Connecticut Huskies
2015 season
- Head Coach: Ray Reid
- Stadium: Morrone Stadium
- NCAA: 10–6–6
- The American: 3–3–2

2015 American Athletic Conference men's soccer standings
	Conf.					Overall
Team	W		L		T	W		L		T
No. 11 SMU +	7	–	0	–	1	15	–	3	–	4
No. 15 South Florida +	5	–	1	–	2	11	–	6	–	3
Connecticut +	3	–	3	–	2	10	–	6	–	6
Tulsa ‡	3	–	3	–	2	8	–	6	–	7
UCF	3	–	4	–	1	7	–	8	–	2
Temple	2	–	6	–	0	10	–	7	–	2
Cincinnati	1	–	4	–	3	7	–	9	–	3
Memphis	1	–	4	–	3	3	–	10	–	4
‡ - Tournament champion +- Invited to the NCAA Division I Men's Soccer Championship; As of November 29, 2015; Rankings from NSCAA

The 2015 Connecticut Huskies men's soccer team represented the University of Connecticut during the 2015 NCAA Division I men's soccer season. The Huskies were coached by Ray Reid, in his nineteenth season. They played home games at Morrone Stadium.

Connecticut advanced to the second round of the 2015 College Cup, where they lost to Indiana.

== Schedule ==
Date Time, TV	Rank^{#}	Opponent^{#}	Result	Record	Site (Attendance) City, State
Exhibition
August 16*		Rider	T 2–2		Morrone Stadium (550); Storrs, CT
August 22*		Syracuse	L 1–2		Morrone Stadium (1,200); Storrs, CT
Regular season
August 28*		St. Francis Brooklyn	T 0–0 ^{2OT}	0–0–1	Morrone Stadium (3,618); Storrs, CT
August 31*		Quinnipiac	T 0–0 ^{2OT}	0–0–2	Morrone Stadium (5,100); Storrs, CT
September 4*		Dartmouth	T 0–0 ^{2OT}	0–0–3	Morrone Stadium (3,557); Storrs, CT
September 10*		at Harvard	W 2–1	1–0–3	Soldiers Field Soccer Stadium (135); Boston, MA
September 13*		UC Santa Barbara	W 2–1	2–0–3	Morrone Stadium (2,617); Storrs, CT
September 19*		Rhode Island	W 1–0	3–0–3	Morrone Stadium (4,442); Storrs, CT
September 22*		at Boston College	L 1–3	3–1–3	Newton Soccer Complex (421); Newton, MA
September 26		at South Florida	L 0–1	3–2–3 (0–1–0)	Corbett Soccer Stadium (1,325); Tampa, FL
September 30*		Providence	PPD		Morrone Stadium; Storrs, CT
October 3		Memphis	L 0–1 ^{2OT}	3–3–3 (0–2–0)	Morrone Stadium (4,115); Storrs, CT
October 7		Cincinnati	T 1–1	3–3–4 (0–2–1)	Morrone Stadium (1,844); Storrs, CT
October 10		at SMU	L 0–1	3–4–4 (0–3–1)	Westcott Field (478); Dallas, TX
October 13*		at Louisville	L 1–2	3–5–4	Lynn Stadium (2,175); Louisville, KY
October 17		UCF	W 2–1	4–5–4 (1–3–1)	Morrone Stadium (5,100); Storrs, CT
October 21		at Temple	W 2–0	5–5–4 (2–3–1)	Ambler Soccer Field; Philadelphia, PA
October 24		at Tulsa	T 1–1 ^{2OT}	5–5–5 (2–3–2)	Hurricane Soccer & Track Stadium (613); Tulsa, OK
October 27*		Yale	W 1–0	6–5–5	Morrone Stadium (2,465); Storrs, CT
October 31		South Florida	W 2–1 ^{OT}	7–5–5 (3–3–2)	Morrone Stadium (3,798); Storrs, CT
AAC Tournament
November 7		Temple	W 4–0	8–5–5	Morrone Stadium (3,975); Storrs, CT
November 13		at South Florida	W 2–1	9–5–5	Corbett Soccer Stadium (1,184); Tampa, FL
November 15		vs. Tulsa	T 1–1^{2OT} (PK 3–4)	9–5–6	Corbett Soccer Stadium; Tampa, FL
NCAA Tournament
November 19		Boston University	W 3–1	10–5–6	Morrone Stadium (1,423); Storrs, CT
November 22		at Indiana	L 0–1	10–6–6	Bill Armstrong Stadium (618); Bloomington, IN
*Non-conference game. ^{#}Rankings from United Soccer Coaches. (#) Tournament seedings in parentheses.
