= 2014 American Athletic Conference men's soccer tournament =

- Tournament Logo
- Classification: Division I
- Teams: 8
- Matches: 7
- Site: Morrone Stadium; Storrs, Connecticut
- Champions: Tulsa (6th title)
- Winning coach: Tom McIntosh (5th title)
- Broadcast: American Digital Network ESPN3

2014 American Athletic Conference men's soccer standings
	Conf.					Overall
Team	W		L		T	W		L		T
UConn	6	–	1	–	1	10	–	6	–	3
Tulsa ‡	5	–	2	–	1	11	–	6	–	3
SMU	4	–	2	–	2	10	–	6	–	2
South Florida	4	–	3	–	1	10	–	7	–	3
Memphis	3	–	4	–	1	9	–	7	–	2
UCF	1	–	3	–	4	2	–	10	–	6
Cincinnati	2	–	5	–	1	5	–	10	–	3
Temple	1	–	6	–	1	2	–	14	–	2
‡ - Tournament champion +- Invited to the NCAA Division I Men's Soccer Championship; As of November 21, 2014; Rankings from NSCAA

The 2014 American Athletic Conference men's soccer tournament was the 2nd edition of the American Athletic Conference Men's Soccer Tournament. The tournament decided the American Athletic Conference champion and guaranteed representative into the 2014 NCAA Division I Men's Soccer Championship. First round matchups were held at campus sites on Saturday, November 8, while the semifinals were played at Morrone Stadium on the campus of Connecticut in Storrs, Connecticut.

== Bracket ==
Quarterfinals
1	Connecticut	5
8	Temple	0
4	South Florida	4
5	Memphis	2
6	UCF	0
3	SMU	4
7	Cincinnati	0
2	Tulsa	1

Semifinals
1	Connecticut	0 (0)
4	South Florida (pen.)	0 (2)
3	SMU	0
2	Tulsa	2

Finals
4	South Florida	0 (5)
2	Tulsa (pen.)	0 (6)
