= 2015 American Athletic Conference men's soccer tournament =

- Tournament Logo
- Classification: Division I
- Teams: 8
- Matches: 7
- Site: Corbett Stadium; Tampa, Florida
- Champions: Tulsa (7th title)
- Winning coach: Tom McIntosh (6th title)
- Broadcast: ESPNU

2015 American Athletic Conference men's soccer standings
	Conf.					Overall
Team	W		L		T	W		L		T
No. 11 SMU +	7	–	0	–	1	15	–	3	–	4
No. 15 South Florida +	5	–	1	–	2	11	–	6	–	3
Connecticut +	3	–	3	–	2	10	–	6	–	6
Tulsa ‡	3	–	3	–	2	8	–	6	–	7
UCF	3	–	4	–	1	7	–	8	–	2
Temple	2	–	6	–	0	10	–	7	–	2
Cincinnati	1	–	4	–	3	7	–	9	–	3
Memphis	1	–	4	–	3	3	–	10	–	4
‡ - Tournament champion +- Invited to the NCAA Division I Men's Soccer Championship; As of November 29, 2015; Rankings from NSCAA

The 2015 American Athletic Conference men's soccer tournament was the 3rd edition of the American Athletic Conference Men's Soccer Tournament. The tournament decided the American Athletic Conference champion and guaranteed representative into the 2015 NCAA Division I Men's Soccer Championship. First round matchups were held at campus sites on Saturday, November 7, while the semifinals were played at Corbett Soccer Stadium on the campus of South Florida in Tampa, FL.

== Seeding and format ==
The teams are seeded based on their performance in the conference's round-robin regular season. All eight teams qualify for the event. Connecticut claimed the third seed over Tulsa based on its win over second seeded South Florida. UConn and Tulsa tied in the regular season, and both lost to top seeded SMU. Memphis took the seventh seed based on its head to head win over Cincinnati.

Team	W	L	T	Pct	Seed
SMU	7	0	1	.938	1
South Florida	5	1	2	.750	2
Connecticut	3	3	2	.500	3
Tulsa	3	3	2	.500	4
UCF	3	4	1	.438	5
Temple	2	6	0	.250	6
Memphis	1	4	3	.313	7
Cincinnati	1	4	3	.313	8

== Bracket ==
Quarterfinals
1	SMU	2
8	Cincinnati	1
4	Tulsa (pen.)	2 (4)
5	UCF	2 (2)
3	Connecticut	4
6	Temple	0
2	South Florida	1
7	Memphis	0

Semifinals
1	SMU	2 (3)
4	Tulsa (pen.)	2 (4)
3	Connecticut	2
2	South Florida	1

Finals
4	Tulsa (pen.)	1 (4)
3	Connecticut	1 (3)

== All-Tournament team ==
- Kwame Awuah, Connecticut
- Abdou Mbacke Thiam, Connecticut
- Tyler Leeman, Connecticut
- Scott Levene, Connecticut
- John Lujano, SMU
- Nazeem Bartman, South Florida
- Bradley Bourgeois, Tulsa (most outstanding defensive player)
- Geoffrey Dee, Tulsa
- Jake McGuire, Tulsa
- Lesley Nchanji, Tulsa (most outstanding offensive player)
- Miguel Velazquez, Tulsa
