= 1985 NCAA Division II soccer tournament =

1985 NCAA Division II Soccer Championship
Tournament details
- Country: United States
- Teams: 12

Final positions
- Champions: Seattle Pacific (3rd)
- Runners-up: Florida International

Tournament statistics
- Matches played: 11
- Goals scored: 38 (3.45 per match)
- Top goal scorer(s): (United States) P Hattrup, SPU (5)

The 1985 NCAA Division II Soccer Championship was the 14th annual tournament held by the NCAA to determine the top men's Division II college soccer program in the United States.

In a rematch of the previous year's final, Seattle Pacific defeated defending champions Florida International, 3–2, to win their third Division II national title. The Falcons (20–3) were coached by Cliff McCrath.

The final match was played on December 7 at Florida International University in Miami, Florida.

== Bracket ==
First Round; *Campus sites
*	Keene State	0
NYIT	3
*	UM–Saint Louis	2
Barry	0
East Stroudsburg	0
*	Davis & Elkins	4
*	Cal State Northridge	3
Chapman	0

Quarterfinals; *Campus sites
*	S. Connecticut State	1
NYIT	3
UM–Saint Louis	0
*	Florida International	1
*	Gannon	1
Davis & Elkins	2
*	Cal State Northridge	2
Seattle Pacific	3

Semifinals; *Campus sites
NYIT	1
*	Florida International	4
Davis & Elkins	1
*	Seattle Pacific	2

Final; December 7 Miami, FL
Florida International	2
Seattle Pacific	3

== Final ==
December 7, 1985

Florida International	2–3	Seattle Pacific
Juan Gomez 64'; Rodolfo Oliver 70'	Report	Peter Hattrup 24', 38:21'; Glenn Lurie 49:11' (Hattrup)

Sunblazers Stadium, Miami, Florida
Attendance: 1,480

== See also ==
- NCAA Division I Men's Soccer Championship
- NCAA Division III Men's Soccer Championship
- NAIA Men's Soccer Championship
