= Bob Gray (soccer) =

American soccer coach

Personal information
- Full name: Robert Edward Gray
- Date of birth: December 8, 1952 (age 73)
- Height: 5 ft 8 in (1.73 m)
- Position: Defender

Youth career
- Years: Team
- 1971–1974: Alderson Broaddus

Managerial career
- 1977: Baptist College
- 1978–1991: Alderson Broaddus
- 1992–1994: University of Mobile
- 1995–2016: Marshall University

Robert Edward Gray, also known as Bob Gray, was a former head men's soccer coach.

== Career ==
Gray held the position of Marshall Thundering Herd men's soccer head coach from 1995 to 2016, compiling a 129-127-15 record. He led the Thundering Herd to three berths in the Conference USA tournament. He owns a career record of 384–203–40. In 2005, he led the Thundering Herd to a 4-3-2 record in its first season in Conference USA, and was named Conference USA coach of the year for his efforts. He holds the team's all-time record for most wins by a coach.

From 1992 to 1994, he served as the head men's soccer coach at the University of Mobile, where he compiled a 47-12-4 record. In 1994, he led the Rams to a 21–4 record, and an appearance in the NAIA national championship game. From 1978 to 1991, he served as the head men's soccer coach at Alderson Broaddus from 1978 to 1991. He guided that team to five appearances in the NAIA national tournament. His teams won 255 games at Alderson-Broaddus, and finished 2nd in the nation in 1981 and 1988, and 3rd in the nation in 1983 and 1991. He was named NSCAA national coach of the year in 1991. He earned five West Virginia Intercollegiate Athletic Conference coach of the year honors five times, and won the league championship seven times.
