= Richie Grant (soccer) =

American soccer player & coach (born 1970)

Personal information
- Date of birth: 28 February 1970 (age 56)
- Place of birth: Dublin, Ireland
- Position: Defender

Youth career
- 1990–1992: Green Mountain College

Senior career*
Years	Team	Apps	(Gls)
1993	Minnesota Thunder		

Managerial career
- 1993–1995: Bloomsburg U. (assistant)
- 1995–1998: Lambuth University
- 1999–2013: University of Memphis
- 2014–2022: Cal State Bakersfield
- * Club domestic league appearances and goals

Richie Grant (born 28 February 1970) is a soccer coach. He is formerly the head men's soccer coach at the California State University, Bakersfield. He has held that position since 2014, and has posted a 102–83–16 record in ten seasons. He is a two-time Conference USA Coach of the Year winner, and led the 2004 squad to the NCAA tournament, their first appearance since 1993. The 2004 team also won the Conference USA title. His teams have been ranked in the top 25 four out of the past five years, including a school record national ranking of 10.

He previously served as the head men's soccer coach at Lambuth University in Jackson, Tennessee. He led that program to a 53–29–2 record over 4 seasons including back-to-back Mid-South conference titles. He is a 1993 graduate of Green Mountain College in Poultney, Vermont, where he was a three-time NAIA all-American defender. He later played for the Minnesota Thunder.
