= Longwood Lancers men's soccer =

American college soccer team

- Founded: 1977; 49 years ago
- University: Longwood University
- Head coach: Jon Atkinson (17th season)
- Conference: Big South
- Location: Farmville, Virginia, US
- Stadium: Longwood Athletics Complex (capacity: 350)
- Nickname: Lancers
- Colors: Blue and white
Home	Away

Conference tournament championships
- 2008, 2011

The Longwood Lancers men's soccer team is an intercollegiate varsity sports team of Longwood University. The team is a member of the Big South Conference of the National Collegiate Athletic Association.

== Roster ==
As of 1 Oct 2024

Note: Flags indicate national team as defined under FIFA eligibility rules; some limited exceptions apply. Players may hold more than one non-FIFA nationality.

No.	Pos.	Nation	Player
0	GK	USA	Christian Cordova
1	GK	GER	Max Hinke
2	DF	USA	Aristhid Kamdjin
3	DF	ARG	Joaquin Sonez
4	MF	DEN	David Ambaek
5	DF	CRC	Anthony Vargas
6	MF	USA	Paul Espinoza
7	MF	GER	Aaron Asamoah
8	MF	SUI	Diego Vargas
9	FW	NOR	Markus Krogstad
10	MF	USA	Ethan Stevenson
11	FW	POR	Simao Coelho
12	DF	USA	Oscar Ford
13	MF	ESP	Mateo Nance

No.	Pos.	Nation	Player
14	DF	USA	Kunandy Ouattara
15	FW	USA	Brando Bedolla
16	FW	USA	Muazu Sagir
17	MF	USA	Ezrah Serralde
18	DF	GER	Valentin Brandis
19	FW	USA	Desmond Adeyemi
20	FW	ESP	Iago Rodriguez
21	DF	USA	Mikey Hernandez
22	DF	USA	Joshua Yoder
23	MF	ESP	Jesus Macaya
24	DF	USA	Alexandre Bouchet
25	DF	MEX	Angel Valdez
26	FW	USA	Diego Diaz
40	GK	USA	Nate Miller

== Coaching staff ==
Name	Position coached	Consecutive season at Longwood in current position
Jon Atkinson	Head coach	17th
Sam Avery	Assistant coach	4th
Carly Fullerton	Athletic Trainer	2nd
Tyler Wrenn	Performance coach	2nd

== Championships ==
=== Atlantic Soccer Conference Tournament Championships ===
Year	Coach	Opponent	Score	Site	Overall Record	Conf. Record
2008	Jon Atkinson	Adelphi	1–0	Farmville, VA	8–8–4	3–1–0
2011	Jon Atkinson	Adelphi	0–0	Garden City, NY	11–6–3	4–0–0
Conference Tournament Championships						2

== Rivalries ==
Longwood's primary rivals are Liberty and Radford.

=== Record against Big South opponents ===
Opponent	Series record (Conference record)
Campbell	4–2–1 (4–2–1)
Gardner–Webb	4–1–1 (4–1–1)
High Point	2–5–2 (1–5–1)
Presbyterian	2–5–2 (1–5–1)
Radford	3–7–1 (1–5–1)
UNC Asheville	5–3–1 (5–2–0)
USC Upstate	0–0–1 (0–0–1)
Winthrop	0–5–0 (0–5–0)
Total	20–28–9 (16–25–6)

Totals through March 17, 2019

== Individual honors ==
Year	Player	Honor	Ref.
2016	Finnlay Wyatt	Big South First Team All-Conference	
2016	Finnlay Wyatt	VaSID All-State First Team	
2015	Willy Miezan	VaSID All-State First Team	
2013	Jon Atkinson	Big South Coach of the Year	
2009	Martin Vickerton	VaSID All-State First Team	

== Team honors ==
- Atlantic Soccer Conference Tournament
  - Winners (2): 2008, 2011
