= Tony Colavecchia =

English footballer and manager

Personal information
- Date of birth: 7 August 1963 (age 63)
- Place of birth: Skegness, England
- Position: Midfielder

Youth career
- 1980: St. Paul's College, Cheltenham

Senior career*
Years	Team	Apps	(Gls)
- Lincoln City Football Club

Managerial career
- 1986–1988: Evansville (assistant)
- 1988–1996: University of Southern Indiana
- 1996–2005: University of Louisville
- * Club domestic league appearances and goals

Tony Colavecchia (born 7 August 1963) is a former collegiate soccer head coach. From 1996 to 2005, he served as the head men's soccer coach at the University of Louisville, where he compiled an 80–101–18 record. He had his best season in 2000, when the squad won 12 games. He was named Conference USA Coach of the Year in 2002, when the Cards posted their best ever conference record at 6–2–3.

From 1988 to 1996, he was the head coach at the University of Southern Indiana, compiling a 68–25–9 record. From 1988 to 1990, he was named Great Lakes Valley Conference Coach of the Year. He was previously an assistant coach at the University of Evansville for 3 years.

He played professional soccer as a midfielder for Lincoln City Football Club. Currently he coaches at the Arizona soccer club SC del Sol.
