= 2020 American Athletic Conference men's soccer tournament =

Soccer tournament

- Classification: Division I
- Teams: 4
- Matches: 3
- Attendance: 950
- Site: UCF Soccer and Track Complex; Orlando, Florida
- Champions: UCF (1st title)
- Winning coach: Scott Calabrese (1st title)
- MVP: Off: Lucca Dourado (UCF); Def: Yannik Oettl (UCF)
- Broadcast: ESPN+

2020 American Athletic Conference men's soccer standings
	Conf.					Overall
Team	W		L		T	W		L		T
No. 13 UCF ‡	7	–	3	–	0	9	–	4	–	1
Tulsa	6	–	3	–	1	6	–	4	–	2
Temple	5	–	4	–	1	5	–	4	–	2
SMU	5	–	5	–	0	5	–	5	–	1
South Florida	4	–	6	–	0	4	–	6	–	0
Memphis	2	–	8	–	0	2	–	8	–	0
Note: Due to COVID-19, the NCAA suspended the 2020 men's soccer season for fall ‡ – 2020 American Tournament champion + – Also invited to the 2020 NCAA Tournament; As of May 28, 2021; Rankings from United Soccer Coaches

The 2020 American Athletic Conference men's soccer tournament was scheduled to be the 8th edition of the American Athletic Conference Men's Soccer Tournament. The tournament decided the American Athletic Conference champion and guaranteed representative into the 2020 NCAA Division I men's soccer tournament. The tournament began on 15 April 2021 and concluded on 17 April 2021.

== Seeds ==
Seed	School	Conference
1	UCF	7–3
2	Tulsa	6–3–1
3	Temple	5–4–1
4	SMU	5–5

== Bracket ==
Semi-finals
15 April – Orlando
No. 1 UCF (pen.)	1 (4)
No. 4 SMU	1 (3)
15 April – Orlando
No. 2 Tulsa (pen.)	1 (3)
No. 3 Temple	1 (1)

Final
17 April – Orlando
No. 1 UCF	1
No. 2 Tulsa	0

== Matches ==
=== Semi-finals ===
15 April 2021
16:00 EDT

No. 2 Tulsa	1–1 (a.e.t.)	No. 3 Temple
Torrijos 51'	Report	Campbell 74'
Penalties
Sach (penalty scored); Bromstedt (penalty scored); Barkley (penalty missed); Meinhard (penalty scored)	3–1	(penalty missed) Cayet; (penalty missed) Cohen; (penalty missed) O'Connor; (penalty scored) Grant

UCF Soccer and Track Complex, Orlando
Attendance: 74

15 April 2021
19:00 EDT

No. 1 UCF	1–1 (a.e.t.)	No. 4 SMU
Dourado 74'	Report	Costa 78' (pen.)
Penalties
Vivi (penalty scored); Ydrach (penalty scored); Leerman (penalty scored); Barry (penalty missed); Villalobos (penalty scored)	4–3	(penalty missed) Costa; (penalty scored) Hummrich; (penalty missed) Ahlander; (penalty scored) Terwege; (penalty scored) Hilt

UCF Soccer and Track Complex, Orlando
Attendance: 325

=== Final ===
17 April 2021
19:00 EST

No. 1 UCF	1–0	No. 2 Tulsa
Dourado 9'	Report

UCF Soccer and Track Complex, Orlando
Attendance: 551
Referee: Mark Kadlecik

== Honors ==
Announced after the championship game.

=== Individual awards ===
- most outstanding offensive player: Lucca Dourado, F, UCF
- most outstanding defensive player: Yannik Oettl, GK, UCF

=== All-Tournament team ===
- Yannik Oettl, GK, UCF
- Lucca Dourado, F, UCF
- Yanis Leerman, D, UCF
- Mauricio Villalobos, M, UCF
- Gino Vivi, F, UCF
- Beto Ydrich, M, UCF
- Skage Simsonen, M, SMU
- Pierre Cayet, D, Temple
- Chase Bromstedt, M, Tulsa
- Jonathan Cervantes, M, Tulsa
- Alvaro Torrijos, F, Tulsa
