= Munga Eketebi =

Congolese American former soccer forward

Munga Eketeb
Personal information
- Full name: Munga Eketeb
- Place of birth: DR Congo
- Position: Forward

Team information
- Current team: Broward Seahawks (Head Coach)

Youth career
- 1976–1979: Collège du Léman

College career
Years	Team	Apps	(Gls)
1983–1986	FIU Panthers		

Managerial career
- 1987–1995: FIU Panthers (assistant)
- 1996: Nova Southeastern Knights
- 1997–2007: FIU Panthers (assistant)
- 2007–2011: FIU Panthers
- 2014–: Broward Seahawks

Munga Eketebi is a Congolese American former soccer forward who is currently the head men's soccer coach at Broward College.

== Playing career ==
Eketebi attended Florida International University from 1983 to 1986 and was a standout player for the Panthers. A prolific scorer as a collegian, Eketebi's 50 career goals still remain tied to most of FIU history. Additionally, his 124 career points rank second and his 24 assists tie him for fifth among FIU's all-time scoring leaders. He was a key member of the 1984 Division II National Championship squad and the 1985 national runner-up team with six playoff goals, including four in an NCAA Tournament win over the Lock Haven Bald Eagles in 1984.

Eketebi is one of only a handful of FIU student-athletes ever to be voted All-America three times. He is a member of the university's Wall of Fame and was also a four-time all-state and three-time All-South honoree. After helping FIU to the NCAA Division II National Championship final, Eketebi was selected as the state of Florida's Player of the Year in 1985.

== Coaching career ==
After his outstanding playing career, longtime FIU coach Karl Kremser brought Eketebi back in to be his top assistant. As an assistant from 1987 to 2007, Eketebi helped with day-to-day practices, administrative duties and recruiting. Eketebi took a short hiatus from FIU in 1996 when he served a one-year stint as the men's head coach of the Nova Southeastern Knights. There, he guided the NAIA Knights to a 12-6-1 record, including an undefeated regular-season record in the Sun Conference. After Coach Kremser retired in 2007, FIU promoted Eketebi to head coach. Unable to win a conference championship in five seasons, FIU decided to replace Eketebi in 2011. After FIU, Eketebi started coaching youth soccer in College Station, Texas until he was named Broward College's first full-time head coach in 2014.

Eketebi has extensive ties to youth soccer in South Florida. Eketebi, who has his Florida coaching license, served as an assistant coach with the USISL Florida Stars and the South Florida select program. He was involved administratively with the Miami Sharks and Miami Freedom of the American Professional Soccer League. He also assisted with many international games played throughout South Florida, including the Marlboro Cup, U.S. Cup and the Pélé Cup. Eketebi headed the Gulliver Prep girls' squad and the Miami Futbol Club from 1991 to 1993, K-Land Youth Clubs from 1985 to 1990, Miami Springs High School in 1985-86 and Belen Jesuit Prep in 1983.
