= American Conference =

American Conference may refer to:

- American Conference (NCAA)
- American Conference of Governmental Industrial Hygienists, professional organization in the field of industrial hygiene
- Pan-American Conference, an international trade summit held in Bogotá, Colombia in 1948
- In professional gridiron football:
  - American Football Conference (AFC) of the National Football League
  - American Conference of the Arena Football League
  - All-America Football Conference, a league which played from 1946 to 1949
  - South Division (CFL), a division of American teams playing in the Canadian Football League in 1995
- In professional soccer:
  - American Conference (NASL), a former conference in the first iteration North American Soccer League
- In school sports:
  - American Conference (CIF), a California high-school organization
