= Atlantic Soccer Conference =

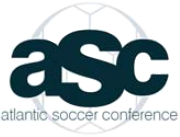
- Sport: Association football
- Founded: 2000
- Folded: 2011; 15 years ago
- Commissioner: Alexis Schug
- Organizing body: NCAA
- Sports fielded: 1; men's: 1; women's: 0
- Division: Division I
- No. of teams: 9 at establishment; 5 in final season
- Headquarters: Philadelphia, PA
- Region: Atlantic Coast and Texas

Atlantic Soccer Conference (ASC) was a college athletic conference headquartered in Philadelphia, which only sponsored men's soccer. The conference participated in the NCAA's Division I and its champion did not receive an automatic bid to the annual NCAA tournament.

It was founded in 2000 with nine colleges and universities as its members but disbanded following the 2011 season when its membership dwindled to three members.

== Membership ==
Team	State	Tenure	Current conference (Note: As of November 2025)
Adelphi Panthers	New York	2000–2011	Northeast-10 (D-II)
Albany Great Danes	New York	2000	America East
Binghamton Bearcats	New York	2000–2001	America East
Florida Atlantic Owls	Florida	2007	American
FIU Golden Panthers (Note: FIU dropped "Golden" from its nickname in 2010.)	Florida	2000–2004	American
Hartwick Hawks	New York	2000–2006	Empire 8 (D-III) (Note: Hartwick continued playing men's soccer in Division I, most recently in the Sun Belt Conference, before moving that team to its full-time Division III home of the Empire 8 in 2018.)
Houston Baptist Huskies	Texas	2008–2011	Ohio Valley
Howard Bison	Washington, D.C.	2000–2011	Northeast
Longwood Lancers	Virginia	2005–2011	Big South
NJIT Highlanders	New Jersey	2004–2011	America East
Oneonta Red Dragons	New York	2000–2005	SUNYAC (D-III)
Jefferson Rams (Note: In 2017, Philadelphia University merged with Thomas Jefferson University, a nearby school that only awarded postgraduate degrees and had no athletic program. The two institutions brand themselves collectively as "Jefferson". The PhilaU athletic program continued as the Jefferson athletic program, retaining the Rams nickname.)	Pennsylvania	2000–2007	Central Athletic (D-II)
Stony Brook Seawolves	New York	2000	Coastal Athletic

== Champions ==
Key

- (x) = title number

=== Regular season ===
Ed.	Season	Champion	Record
1	2000	FIU (1)	7–1–0
2	2001	Philadelphia (1)	5–1–0
3	2002	FIU (2)	4–0–1
4	2003	FIU (3)	4–0–1
5	2004	FIU (4)	5–0–0
6	2005	Hartwick (1)	5–1–0
7	2006	Adelphi (1)	5–0–1
8	2007	Florida Atlantic (1)	4–0–1
9	2008	Adelphi (2)	4–0–0
10	2009	Adelphi (3)	2–1–1
11	2010	Houston Baptist (1)	3–0–1
12	2011	Longwood (1)	4–0–0

=== Tournament ===
Ed.	Season	Champion
–	2000–2004	(no tournament held)
1	2005	Hartwick (1)
2	2006	Adelphi (1)
3	2007	Florida Atlantic (1)
4	2008	Longwood (1)
5	2009	Adelphi (2)
6	2010	Adelphi (3)
7	2011	Longwood (2)
