= Alexander Petræus =

Danish footballer (born 2002)

Personal information
- Full name: Alexander Larsø Petræus
- Date of birth: 29 June 2002 (age 24)
- Place of birth: Hvidovre, Denmark
- Height: 1.76 m (5 ft 9 in)
- Position: Winger

Team information
- Current team: Fremad Amager
- Number: 25

Youth career
- –2017: Brøndby
- 2018-2022: Lyngby

College career
Years	Team	Apps	(Gls)
2022–2023	SMU Mustangs	34	(5)

Senior career*
Years	Team	Apps	(Gls)
2021–2022	Lyngby	3	(0)
2024–	Fremad Amager	51	(7)
- * Club domestic league appearances and goals as of 15:15, 11 October 2025 (UTC)

Alexander Larsø Petræus (born 29 June 2002) is a Danish footballer who plays as a winger for Danish 2nd Division side Fremad Amager.

== Career ==
=== Club career ===
Petræus started his football career in Brøndby IF. In the winter of 2018, Petræus switched to Lyngby Boldklub, where he started at the club's youth academy. In the summer of 2019, he suffered a career-threatening head injury that kept him out for 12 months. Petræus bounced back and it wasn't long before he started training with the first team.

On 18 April 2021, Petræus made his official debut for Lyngby in a Danish Superliga match against AC Horsens, where he replaced Victor Torp in injury time. Petræus left Lyngby in the summer of 2022 after playing 5 games for the first team.

In July 2022, Petræus moved to the United States to study at Southern Methodist University and played college football for the SMU Mustangs. In January 2024, Petræus returned to Denmark, signing with Danish 2nd Division side Fremad Amager.
