= FIU Panthers men's soccer =

American college soccer team

- Founded: 1972; 54 years ago
- University: Florida International University
- Head coach: Kyle Russel (5th season)
- Conference: American
- Location: Westchester, Florida, US
- Stadium: FIU Soccer Stadium (capacity: 2,000)
- Nickname: Panthers
- Colors: Blue and gold
Home	Away

NCAA tournament championships
- 1982, 1984

NCAA tournament runner-up
- 1996, 1980, 1985

NCAA tournament Quarterfinals
- 1977, 1979, 1983

NCAA tournament Round of 16
- 2003, 2022, 1978

NCAA tournament appearances
- 1991, 1994, 1996, 1997, 2001, 2002, 2003, 2004, 2015, 2017, 2021, 2022, 2023; 1977, 1978, 1979, 1980, 1982, 1983, 1984, 1985

Conference tournament championships
- 1991, 2015, 2022

Conference regular season championships
- 2000, 2002, 2003, 2004, 2017, 2021, 2022

The FIU Panthers men's soccer team is an intercollegiate varsity sports team of Florida International University (FIU). The team is a member of the NCAA Division I American Conference.

== History ==
FIU started their soccer program in 1972. They were unaffiliated from any collegiate organization until they joined the NCAA Division II from 1975 to 1986. During this time, FIU went to 11 NCAA Division II Tournaments where they won the national championships in 1982 and 1984 and runners up in 1980 and 1985.

Due to the success of their program in Division II, they became an NCAA Division I team in 1987. The team has represented FIU at 8 NCAA Division I Tournaments finishing runners up in 1996.

FIU's most recent conference change was announced during the 2021–22 offseason, when it left Conference USA (C-USA) for The American. The decision of the Sun Belt Conference to reinstate its men's soccer league effective with the 2022 season dropped the C-USA men's soccer membership to four (Charlotte, FIU, Florida Atlantic, UAB). Of these four schools, all but FIU (which remains a full C-USA member) were scheduled to move fully to The American in the near future, with a July 2023 entry date later confirmed. Accordingly, The American brought all four remaining C-USA men's soccer teams into its own soccer league. FIU will remain an affiliate of The American after the other three schools fully join that league.

== Conferences ==
Throughout their history, the team has been part of several collegiate athletic conferences. They were members of the Trans America Athletic Conference (now known as the ASUN Conference) from 1991 to 1997 where they won the Conference Tournament in 1991. They joined the Atlantic Soccer Conference from 2000 to 2004 where they were Conference Regular Season Champions in 2000, 2002, 2003, and 2004. From 2005 to 2021, the team was a member of Conference USA, and it joined the American Conference in 2022.

- Independent (1972–1990)
- TAAC (1991–1997)
- Independent (1998–1999)
- ASC (2000–2004)
- C-USA (2005–2021)
- The American (2022–present)

== Roster ==
As of August 31, 2025

Note: Flags indicate national team as defined under FIFA eligibility rules; some limited exceptions apply. Players may hold more than one non-FIFA nationality.

No.	Pos.	Nation	Player
1	GK	ESP	Beltran Fernandez
2	DF	FRA	Tibo Gobet
3	DF	USA	Owen Travis
4	DF	GER	Jesse Osei
5	DF	BEL	Emmanuel Gore Bi
6	MF	FRA	Mathys Lefebvre
8	MF	USA	David Boccuzzo
10	MF	USA	Nicolas Villalobos
11	MF	SCO	Scott Neil
12	FW	USA	Enrique Mutsoli
13	DF	KOR	Dohyun Koh
14	MF	SCO	Dominic Brady
15	MF	CAN	Lukas Pareja

No.	Pos.	Nation	Player
16	MF	ITA	Leonardo Consoloni
17	FW	FRA	Johan Helan
18	MF	POR	João Domíngues
19	FW	USA	Alejandro Nasato
20	FW	ITA	Pasquale Capriati
21	FW	SMR	Gabriel Capicchioni
22	DF	CAN	Damian McGregor-Wickham
24	DF	PAN	Alfonso Soriano
25	FW	MEX	Johan Arevalo
26	DF	CAN	Jameel Durhan
27	DF	USA	Diego Sanchez
30	GK	GER	Florian Grollmann
48	GK	NED	Nigel Van Haveren

== Coaches ==
=== Current staff ===
As of August 31, 2025

Position	Staff
Head coach	(United States) Kyle Russell
Associate head coach	(United States) Dannie Merida
Assistant coach	(Italy) Matteo Gasperoni
Volunteer goalkeeping coach	(Italy) Giuseppe Weller

=== All-time head coaches ===
NAt.	Coach	Tenure
USA	Dr. Greg Myers	1972–1974
USA	Bill Nuttall	1975–1979
GER	Karl Kremser	1980–2007
DRC	Munga Eketebi	2007–2011
USA	Kenny Arena	2012–2013
USA	Scott Calabrese	2014–2016
USA	Kevin Nylen	2017–2020
USA	Kyle Russell	2020–Present

== Notable alumni ==
- (Bolivia) José Carlos Fernandez
- (Canada) Stephen Afrifa
- (Democratic Republic of the Congo) Ignace Moleka
- (Haiti) Sebastien Vorbe
- (Jamaica) Tyrone Marshall
- (Jamaica) Alvin James
- (United States) Chris Antonopoulos
- (United States) Bobby Boswell
- (United States) Jeff Cassar
- (United States) Robin Fraser
- (United States) Alen Kozic
- (United States) Steve Ralston
- (United States) Greg Vanney
- (Venezuela) Juan Francisco Guerra

== Honours ==
=== National ===
- NCAA D-I
  - Runners-up (1): 1996
- NCAA D-II
  - Winners (2):1982, 1984
  - Runners-up (2): 1980, 1985

=== Conference ===
Atlantic Soccer

- Regular season (4): 2000, 2002, 2003, 2004

Atlantic Sun

- ASUN tournament (1): 1991

C-USA

- Regular season (2): 2017, 2021
- C-USA tournament (1): 2015

American

- Regular season (1): 2022
- American tournament (1): 2022
