= Mike Getman =

American soccer player and coach

Personal information
- Full name: Michael S. Getman
- Date of birth: c. 1959 (age 66–67)
- Place of birth: Bloomington, Indiana
- Position: Defender

College career
Years	Team	Apps	(Gls)
1977–1981	Indiana Hoosiers		

Senior career*
Years	Team	Apps	(Gls)
1982–1983	Detroit Express		

Managerial career
- 1984–1986: Indiana Hoosiers (assistant)
- 1987–1991: Harvard Crimson
- 1992–2018: UAB Blazers
- * Club domestic league appearances and goals

Mike Getman is a former professional soccer player and collegiate coach. He currently ranks 41st among active head soccer coaches in winning percentage, and 15th in victories. His career head coaching record currently stands at 322–218–56 (.605).

From 1987 to 1991, he served as the head men's soccer coach at Harvard College. His teams posted a 42–26–9 record there, including a 1987 appearance in the Final Four, in which the team finished 14–1–3. He remains the youngest coach ever to reach the Final Four having done so at the age of 28. In 1988, Harvard was ranked No. 1 for the first time in school history. He was an assistant coach at Indiana University from 1984 to 1986.

From 1982 to 1983, he played professionally for the Detroit Express of the American Soccer League as a defender. He earned team rookie of the year honors in 1982, and led the squad to the ASL championship. He played college soccer at Indiana University from 1978 to 1981, and led the Hoosiers to national championship games in 1978 and 1980.

From 1992 to 2018, he was the head coach at UAB, posting a 280–202–47 record during that span. He led the Blazers to eight NCAA tournament appearances including an Elite Eight in 1999, and a Sweet Sixteen in 2001. He coached the team to a 1994 Great Midwest Conference Title, and Conference USA regular season championships in 1995, 1999 and 2011. His 1994 team won the 1994 Great Midwest tournament, and his 1999 team won the Conference USA tournament.

His teams were ranked in eleven out of his last thirteen seasons as head coach of the team, and reached a program best national ranking of 3 in 2003. Furthermore, his teams were known to upset higher ranked teams. The Blazers posted a few victories against No. 1 ranked teams, including UCLA in 1997, North Carolina in 2003, SMU in 2006 and defending NCAA national champions Indiana in 2013. He is the winningest coach in Conference USA history, posting a record 68 league wins. He was named Conference USA Coach of the Decade in 2005, for his career coaching record. Additionally, he was named Conference USA Coach of the Year on three occasions.
