= Florida Atlantic Owls men's soccer =

American college soccer team

- Founded: 1980; 46 years ago
- University: Florida Atlantic University
- Head coach: Joey Worthen (1st season)
- Conference: The American
- Location: Boca Raton, Florida, US
- Stadium: FAU Soccer Stadium (capacity: 1,000)
- Nickname: Owls
- Colors: Blue and red
Home	Away

NCAA tournament appearances
- 2025

Conference tournament championships
- 2007, 2025

Conference regular season championships
- 2004

For information on all Florida Atlantic University sports, see Florida Atlantic Owls

The Florida Atlantic Owls men's soccer team is a varsity intercollegiate athletic team of Florida Atlantic University in Boca Raton, Florida, United States. As of the upcoming 2022 season, the team is a member of the NCAA Division I American Conference (The American). FAU's first men's soccer team was fielded in 1980. The team plays its home games at FAU Soccer Stadium in Boca Raton. The Owls are coached by Joey Worthen.

The Owls' most successful achievement in their history came in 2004, where they finished as co-regular season champions of the Atlantic Sun Conference. In 2007, the Owls won the Atlantic Soccer Conference Tournament, although it does not have a binding NCAA birth. Their strongest performance in the Atlantic Sun Men's Soccer Tournament came in 1997, 1999 and 2003, where the Owls reached the finals, but lost on all three occasions. In 2021, the Owls reached the finals of the 2021 Conference USA Men's Soccer Tournament bust lost to Kentucky in extra time. Florida Atlantic has never qualified for the NCAA Division I Men's Soccer Championship.

FAU's most recent conference change was announced during the 2021–22 offseason, when it left Conference USA (C-USA) for The American. The decision of the Sun Belt Conference to reinstate its men's soccer league effective with the 2022 season dropped the C-USA men's soccer membership to four. Of these four schools, three, including FAU, were scheduled to move fully to The American in the near future, most likely in July 2023. Accordingly, The American brought all four remaining C-USA men's soccer teams into its own soccer league.

== Current roster ==
As of November 2026

Note: Flags indicate national team as defined under FIFA eligibility rules; some limited exceptions apply. Players may hold more than one non-FIFA nationality.

No.	Pos.	Nation	Player
1	GK	DEN	Alfred Mikkelsen
2	MF	USA	Herbert Kwakye-Amoah
3	MF	JPN	Manato Ogawa
4	DF	ENG	David Roberts
5	DF	USA	Luke Noameshie
6	DF	ENG	Nick Kinina
7	DF	FRA	Naim Berbar
9	FW	BEL	Yann Ntumba Tiki
10	FW	USA	Francesco Aiello
11	FW	USA	DJ Koulai
12	DF	USA	Jaiden Paniagua
13	GK	USA	Andy Dunn
14	DF	USA	Emory Crichlow
15	DF	ENG	Josh Ainge
16	DF	DEN	Emil Lausten

No.	Pos.	Nation	Player
17	FW	NOR	Anders Wergeland
18	FW	USA	Xavi Csato
19	FW	GER	Colin Beutel
20	DF	FRA	Enzo Rabot
21	MF	BRA	Felipe Santos
22	DF	USA	Christopher Jean-Francois
23	FW	GER	Michel Tentchou
25	DF	USA	Agnaldo Germano
27	GK	ESP	Adrian Esquivel
28	FW	AUS	Mitchell Rogers
29	MF	USA	David Jesus
30	FW	ENG	Justin Bangura
32	FW	SWE	Olle Lovdahl
33	DF	USA	Kevin Gorbell
37	MF	NOR	Jonas Sundli-Hardig

== Coaches ==
=== Current staff ===
As of 21 Sep 2024

Position	Name
Head coach	Joey Worthen
Assistant coach	Tom Harman
Assistant coach	Brad Shore

=== Coaching history ===
There have been five head coaches in FAU history.

Years	Coach	Pld.	W.	L.	D.	%
1980–1982	Regis Patter	43	17	23	3	.430
1983	Steve Pete	16	9	5	2	.625
1984–1986	Chris Holloway	46	18	25	3	.424
1987–2016	Kos Donev	341	159	168	14	.487
2017–present	Joey Worthen	78	26	46	6	.333

== Titles ==
=== Conference ===
Conference	Championship	#	Season	Score	Rival	Venue
Atlantic Soccer	ASC regular season	1	2007	– (Note: Title awarded by most points earned.)		
Atlantic Soccer	ASC tournament	1	2007	1–1 (8–7 p)	Longwood	LU Athletics Complex
Atlantic Sun	ASUN regular season	1	2004	–		
Atlantic Sun	ASUN tournament	1	2025	3–2 (a.e.t.)	Bellarmine	Hodges Stadium
