= Tom McIntosh (soccer) =

American soccer player and coach

Current position
- Title: Head coach
- Team: Tulsa Golden Hurricane
- Conference: The American

Biographical details
- Born: April 5, 1966 (age 60); Milwaukee, Wisconsin

Playing career
- 1986–1988: Tulsa Golden Hurricane
- 1989: Tulsa Renegades
- Position: Midfielder

Coaching career (HC unless noted)
- 1989–1991: Tulsa Golden Hurricane (asst.)
- 1995: Tulsa Golden Hurricane (interim)
- 1996–: Tulsa Golden Hurricane

Tom McIntosh is the head men's soccer coach at the University of Tulsa. He has coached the team since 1995, and has posted a 167–108–23 career record, making him the school's all-time winningest coach. He has posted ten 10 win seasons, including a school record 16 in 2008. The 2008 squad saw the team reach a school record national ranking of 5. He has led Tulsa to three consecutive Conference USA regular season and tournament titles the past three seasons. He has led the team to the NCAA tournament in three out of the past five seasons. From 1989 to 1991, he was an assistant coach at Tulsa.

He played college soccer at Tulsa himself from 1986 to 1988. In 1989, he played for the Tulsa Renegades.
