= 2026 Sun Belt Conference men's soccer season =

- League: NCAA Division I
- Sport: Soccer
- Duration: August 20, 2026 - December 16, 2026
- Teams: 10

Sun Belt Conference men's soccer seasons
- ← 2025 2027

2026 Sun Belt Conference men's soccer standings
	Conf.					Overall
Team	W		L		T	W		L		T
No. 7 West Virginia †	6	–	1	–	2	10	–	2	–	4
No. 10 Marshall †	6	–	1	–	2	10	–	2	–	4
UCF	5	–	3	–	1	9	–	4	–	3
James Madison	4	–	2	–	3	7	–	6	–	4
Coastal Carolina	4	–	3	–	2	6	–	6	–	4
South Carolina	3	–	4	–	2	10	–	2	–	5
Kentucky	3	–	4	–	2	3	–	9	–	4
Georgia Southern	2	–	5	–	2	6	–	6	–	4
Old Dominion	2	–	6	–	1	10	–	6	–	1
Georgia State	1	–	7	–	1	7	–	9	–	2
† – Conference champion ‡ – 2026 Sun Belt Conference tournament champion + – At-large invitation to the 2026 NCAA tournament; As of November 3, 2026; Rankings from United Soccer Coaches; Source: Sun Belt

The 2026 Sun Belt Conference men's soccer season is the 24th season of men's varsity soccer in the Sun Belt Conference (SBC), as part of the 2026 NCAA Division I men's soccer season.

== Previous season ==
Kentucky won the Sun Belt Conference regular season, while UCF won the SBC tournament championship.

== Teams ==
=== Stadiums and locations ===
Team	Location	Stadium	Capacity
Coastal Carolina Chanticleers	Conway, South Carolina	CCU Soccer Complex	1,000
Georgia Southern Eagles	Statesboro, Georgia	Eagle Field	3,500
Georgia State Panthers	Decatur, Georgia	GSU Soccer Complex	1,892
James Madison Dukes	Harrisonburg, Virginia	Sentara Park	1,500
Kentucky Wildcats	Lexington, Kentucky	Wendell & Vickie Bell Soccer Complex	3,368
Marshall Thundering Herd	Huntington, West Virginia	Veterans Memorial Soccer Complex	1,006
Old Dominion Monarchs	Norfolk, Virginia	Old Dominion Soccer Complex	4,000
South Carolina Gamecocks	Columbia, South Carolina	Stone Stadium	5,700
UCF Knights	Orlando, Florida	UCF Soccer and Track Stadium	2,000
West Virginia Mountaineers	Morgantown, West Virginia	Dick Dlesk Soccer Stadium	1,600

== Preseason ==
=== Preseason poll ===
The pre-season poll and pre-season all conference teams were voted on by the league's 10 head coaches. The results of the poll were released on August 12, prior to the season starting. The full results of the poll are shown below:

Predicted finish	Team	Points (1st place)
1	West Virginia	94 (4)
2	Marshall	87 (3)
3	UCF	81 (1)
4	Kentucky	76 (2)
5	Georgia Southern	55
6	South Carolina	41
7	Old Dominion	38
8	James Madison	29
9	Coastal Carolina	25
10	Georgia State	24

=== Preseason awards ===
Award	Recipient
Preseason Offensive Player of the Year	Pablo Pozos, West Virginia
Preseason Defensive Player of the Year	Takahiro Fujita, UCF
Preseason Goalkeeper of the Year	Matisse Hébert, UCF

Preseason All-Sun Belt Team

Position	Player	Class	School
Goalkeeper	Matisse Hébert	Junior	UCF
Defender	Takahiro Fujita	Senior	UCF
Defender	Jem Hewlett	Sophomore	UCF
Defender	Max Miller	Graduate Student	Kentucky
Defender	Sinan Solmaz	Senior	Kentucky
Midfielder	Agustin Lopez	Junior	Kentucky
Midfielder	Nacho Martinez	Junior	West Virginia
Midfielder	Isaac Scheer	Junior	West Virginia
Forward	Pablo Pozos	Senior	West Virginia
Forward	Carl Romberg	Senior	Marshall
Forward	Lewis Rourke	Senior	Old Dominion

=== Preseason national polls ===
The preseason national polls were released in August 2026.

	United; Soccer	Top Drawer; Soccer	College; Soccer News
Coastal Carolina	—	—	—
Georgia Southern	—	—	—
Georgia State	—	—	—
James Madison	—	—	—
Kentucky	RV	—	RV
Marshall	17	21	16
Old Dominion	—	—	—
South Carolina	—	—	—
UCF	—	24	—
West Virginia	23	—	22

== Regular season ==
=== National rankings ===
Improvement in ranking
Drop in ranking
Not ranked previous week

		Pre	Wk 1	Wk 2	Wk 3	Wk 4	Wk 5	Wk 6	Wk 7	Wk 8	Wk 9	Wk 10	Wk 11	Wk 12	Wk 13	Wk 14	Wk 15	Final
Coastal Carolina	USC	—	—	—	—	—	—	—	—	—	—	—	—	—	None released			
Coastal Carolina	TDS	—	—	—	—	—	—	—	—	—	—	—	—	—				
Coastal Carolina	CSN	—	—	—	—	—	—	—	—	—	—	—	—		None released			
Georgia Southern	USC	—	—	—	—	—	—	—	RV	RV	—	—	—	—	None released			
Georgia Southern	TDS	—	—	—	—	—	—	24	23	16	23	—	—	—				
Georgia Southern	CSN	—	—	RV	RV	—	—	—	RV	RV	—	—	—		None released			
Georgia State	USC	—	—	—	—	—	—	—	—	—	—	—	—	—	None released			
Georgia State	TDS	—	—	—	—	—	—	—	—	—	—	—	—	—				
Georgia State	CSN	—	—	—	—	—	—	—	—	—	—	—	—		None released			
James Madison	USC	—	—	—	—	—	—	—	—	—	RV	—	—	—	None released			
James Madison	TDS	—	—	—	—	—	—	—	—	—	—	—	—	—				
James Madison	CSN	—	—	—	—	—	—	—	—	—	RV	—	—		None released			
Kentucky	USC	RV	—	—	—	—	—	—	—	—	—	—	—	—	None released			
Kentucky	TDS	—	—	—	—	—	—	—	—	—	—	—	—	—				
Kentucky	CSN	RV	RV	—	—	—	—	—	—	—	—	—	—		None released			
Marshall	USC	17	12	15	20	RV	RV	RV	—	—	RV	21	14	10	None released			
Marshall	TDS	17	21	25	—	—	—	—	—	—	—	—	15	11				
Marshall	CSN	16	15	14	12	21	RV	RV	—	—	—	RV	23		None released			
Old Dominion	USC	—	—	RV	22	13	15	23	—	RV	—	—	—	—	None released			
Old Dominion	TDS	—	—	—	15	11	12	20	—	—	—	—	—	—				
Old Dominion	CSN	—	RV	RV	RV	24	20	22	RV	RV	—	—	—		None released			
South Carolina	USC	—	—	13	6	4	1	11	9	6	18	23т	24	RV	None released			
South Carolina	TDS	—	—	5	3	1	1	11	17	12	20	24	—	—				
South Carolina	CSN	—	RV	20	11	7	4	5	8	6	9	15	21		None released			
UCF	USC	—	—	RV	—	RV	—	—	—	—	—	—	—	—	None released			
UCF	TDS	24	—	—	—	—	—	—	—	—	—	—	—	—				
UCF	CSN	—	—	RV	—	—	—	—	—	—	—	—	—		None released			
West Virginia	USC	23	—	—	—	RV	21	16	15	24	25	13	9	7	None released			
West Virginia	TDS	—	—	—	—	—	—	—	20	—	—	—	17	12				
West Virginia	CSN	22	RV	RV	—	RV	RV	23	17	22	24	22	14		None released			

=== Regional rankings - Southeast Region ===
Legend
Increase in ranking
Decrease in ranking
Not ranked previous week

	Wk 1	Wk 2	Wk 3	Wk 5	Wk 6	Wk 7	Wk 8	Wk 10	Wk 11	Wk 12
Coastal Carolina	—	—	—	—	—	—	—	—	—	7
Georgia Southern	—	9	—	—	5	3	3	10	—	—
Georgia State	—	—	5	—	—	—	—	—	—	—
James Madison	—	—	—	—	—	—	7	4	5	9
Kentucky	8	—	—	—	—	—	—	—	—	—
Marshall	2	2	2	3	4	6	5	2	1	1
Old Dominion	6	4	3	2	3	7	4	8	8	8
South Carolina	5	1	1	1	1	1	1	3	3	3
UCF	3	3	4	7	10	5	8	6	4	4
West Virginia	9	10	8	4	2	2	2	1	2	2

== Awards and honors ==
=== Player of the week honors ===
Week	Offensive		Defensive	
Week	Player	Team	Player	Team
Week 1 (Aug. 25)	Loïc Sany Kong	South Carolina	Will Devine	Coastal Carolina
Week 2 (Sep. 1)	Alejandro Velasquez-Lopez	South Carolina	Takahiro Fujita	UCF
Week 3 (Sep. 8)	Lewis Rourke	Old Dominion	Sandro Rabarivony	Georgia State
Week 4 (Sep. 15)	Pablo Pozos	West Virginia	Mika Habel	South Carolina
Week 5 (Sep. 22)	Loïc Sany Kong (2)	South Carolina	Erik Jaspers	James Madison
Week 6 (Sep. 29)	Broden Beorlegui	Georgia Southern	Jacob Redenfors	West Virginia
Week 7 (Oct. 6)	Takahiro Fujita	UCF	Erik Jaspers (2)	James Madison
Week 8 (Oct. 13)	Mitch Picksley	Georgia Southern	Brock Frasier	James Madison
Week 9 (Oct. 20)	Drew Hansen	UCF	Joao Roberto	Marshall
Week 10 (Oct. 27)				
Week 11 (Nov. 3)				
Week 12 (Nov. 10)				

2026 Sun Belt Men's Soccer Individual Awards
Award	Recipient(s)
Coach of the Year	
Player of the Year	
Offensive Player of the Year	
Defensive Player of the Year	
Goalkeeper of the Year	
Newcomer of the Year	
Freshman of the Year	

2026 Sun Belt Men's Soccer All-Conference Teams
First Team	Second Team	Freshman Team

== MLS SuperDraft ==
=== Total picks by school ===
Team	Round 1	Round 2	Round 3	Total
Coastal Carolina				
Georgia Southern				
Georgia State				
James Madison				
Kentucky				
Marshall				
Old Dominion				
South Carolina				
UCF				
West Virginia				
Total				

=== List of selections ===
Round	Pick #	MLS team	Player	Position	College
