= 2025 Sun Belt Conference men's soccer season =

- League: NCAA Division I
- Sport: Soccer
- Duration: August 21, 2025 - November 16, 2025
- Teams: 10

Regular Season
- Champions: Kentucky
- Runners-up: West Virginia

Tournament
- Champions: UCF
- Runners-up: Marshall

Sun Belt Conference men's soccer seasons
- ← 2024 2026 →

2025 Sun Belt Conference men's soccer standings
| | Conf. | | | | | Overall |
| Team | W | | L | | T | W | | L | | T |
|---|---|---|---|---|---|---|---|---|---|---|
| Kentucky †+ | 7 | – | 1 | – | 1 | 10 | – | 4 | – | 5 |
| No. 23 West Virginia + | 7 | – | 2 | – | 0 | 13 | – | 5 | – | 3 |
| No. 17 Marshall + | 6 | – | 2 | – | 1 | 12 | – | 4 | – | 5 |
| Georgia Southern | 6 | – | 3 | – | 0 | 13 | – | 4 | – | 1 |
| UCF ‡ | 4 | – | 3 | – | 2 | 10 | – | 7 | – | 3 |
| Georgia State | 2 | – | 4 | – | 3 | 4 | – | 8 | – | 6 |
| Old Dominion | 1 | – | 3 | – | 5 | 5 | – | 5 | – | 8 |
| Coastal Carolina | 2 | – | 6 | – | 1 | 3 | – | 9 | – | 2 |
| South Carolina | 1 | – | 6 | – | 2 | 7 | – | 9 | – | 2 |
| James Madison | 0 | – | 6 | – | 3 | 1 | – | 10 | – | 5 |
† – Conference champion ‡ – 2025 Sun Belt Conference tournament champion + – At-large invitation to the 2025 NCAA tournament; As of December 6, 2025; Rankings from United Soccer Coaches; Source: Sun Belt

The 2025 Sun Belt Conference men's soccer season is the 23rd season of men's varsity soccer in the Sun Belt Conference (SBC), as part of the 2025 NCAA Division I men's soccer season.

== Previous season ==
Marshall won both the Sun Belt Conference regular season and tournament championship. Marshall would make it to the College College Cup, losing in the National Championship to Vermont.

== Teams ==
=== Stadiums and locations ===
| Team | Location | Stadium | Capacity |
|---|---|---|---|
| Coastal Carolina Chanticleers | Conway, South Carolina | CCU Soccer Complex | 1,000 |
| Georgia Southern Eagles | Statesboro, Georgia | Eagle Field | 3,500 |
| Georgia State Panthers | Decatur, Georgia | GSU Soccer Complex | 1,892 |
| James Madison Dukes | Harrisonburg, Virginia | Sentara Park | 1,500 |
| Kentucky Wildcats | Lexington, Kentucky | Wendell & Vickie Bell Soccer Complex | 3,368 |
| Marshall Thundering Herd | Huntington, West Virginia | Veterans Memorial Soccer Complex | 1,006 |
| Old Dominion Monarchs | Norfolk, Virginia | Old Dominion Soccer Complex | 4,000 |
| South Carolina Gamecocks | Columbia, South Carolina | Stone Stadium | 5,700 |
| UCF Knights | Orlando, Florida | UCF Soccer and Track Stadium | 2,000 |
| West Virginia Mountaineers | Morgantown, West Virginia | Dick Dlesk Soccer Stadium | 1,600 |

== Preseason ==
=== Preseason poll ===
The pre-season poll and pre-season all conference teams were voted on by the league's 10 head coaches. The results of the poll were released on August 13, prior to the season starting. The full results of the poll are shown below:

| Predicted finish | Team | Points (1st place) |
|---|---|---|
| 1 | Marshall | 97 (8) |
| 2 | West Virginia | 92 (2) |
| 3 | UCF | 74 |
| 4 | Kentucky | 67 |
| 5 | South Carolina | 65 |
| 6 | James Madison | 48 |
| 7 | Old Dominion | 36 |
| 8 | Georgia Southern | 30 |
| 9 | Georgia State | 24 |
| 10 | Coastal Carolina | 17 |

=== Preseason awards ===
Preseason All-Sun Belt Team

| Position | Player | Class | School |
|---|---|---|---|
| Goalkeeper | Sebastian Conlon | Senior | Kentucky |
| Defender | Josh Gordon | Senior | Kentucky |
| Defender | Carlos Hernando | Graduate Student | West Virginia |
| Defender | Takahiro Fujita | Junior | Marshall |
| Midfielder | Alejandro Velazquez-Lopez | Sophomore | South Carolina |
| Midfielder | Alexander Stjernegaard | Senior | South Carolina |
| Midfielder | Isaac Scheer | Sophomore | West Virginia |
| Midfielder | Agustin Lopez | Sophomore | Kentucky |
| Forward | Ryan Holmes | Junior | Georgia Southern |
| Forward | Marcus Caldeira | Senior | West Virginia |
| Forward | Ethan Ballek | Senior | South Carolina |

=== Preseason national polls ===
The preseason national polls were released in August 2025.

| | United; Soccer | Top Drawer; Soccer | College; Soccer News |
| Coastal Carolina | — | — | — |
| Georgia Southern | — | — | — |
| Georgia State | — | — | — |
| James Madison | — | — | — |
| Kentucky | — | — | — |
| Marshall | 2 | 6 | 1 |
| Old Dominion | — | — | — |
| South Carolina | — | — | — |
| UCF | — | — | — |
| West Virginia | 16 | 16 | 11 |

== Regular season ==
=== National rankings ===
| Improvement in ranking |
| Drop in ranking |
| Not ranked previous week |

| | | Pre | Wk 1 | Wk 2 | Wk 3 | Wk 4 | Wk 5 | Wk 6 | Wk 7 | Wk 8 | Wk 9 | Wk 10 | Wk 11 | Wk 12 | Wk 13 | Wk 14 | Wk 15 | Final |
|---|---|---|---|---|---|---|---|---|---|---|---|---|---|---|---|---|---|---|
| Coastal Carolina | USC | — | — | — | — | — | — | — | — | — | — | — | — | — | None released | | | — |
| Coastal Carolina | TDS | — | — | — | — | — | — | — | — | — | — | — | — | — | — | — | — | — |
| Georgia Southern | USC | — | — | — | RV | 25 | 19 | 6 | 11 | 24 | 20 | RV | RV | — | None released | | | — |
| Georgia Southern | TDS | — | — | — | — | — | — | 5 | 10 | 18 | 17 | — | 25 | — | — | — | — | — |
| Georgia State | USC | — | — | — | — | — | — | — | — | — | — | — | — | — | None released | | | — |
| Georgia State | TDS | — | — | — | — | — | — | — | — | — | — | — | — | — | — | — | — | — |
| James Madison | USC | — | — | — | — | — | — | — | — | — | — | — | — | — | None released | | | — |
| James Madison | TDS | — | — | — | — | — | — | — | — | — | — | — | — | — | — | — | — | — |
| Kentucky | USC | — | 18 | 17 | 18 | 22 | 18 | 24 | 19 | 25 | 25т | 18 | 18 | 19 | None released | | | RV |
| Kentucky | TDS | — | — | — | — | — | — | 22 | 22 | 25 | — | 24 | 21 | 22 | — | — | — | — |
| Marshall | USC | 2 | 2 | 2 | 10 | 6 | 4 | 22 | 17 | 12 | 9 | 11 | 17 | 12т | None released | | | 17 |
| Marshall | TDS | 6 | 5 | 4 | 6 | 5 | 2 | 11 | 11 | 9 | 7 | 12 | 18 | 17 | 17 | 23 | 23 | 23 |
| Old Dominion | USC | — | — | — | — | — | — | — | — | — | — | — | — | — | None released | | | — |
| Old Dominion | TDS | — | — | — | — | — | — | — | — | — | — | — | — | — | — | — | — | — |
| South Carolina | USC | — | — | — | — | — | — | — | — | — | — | — | — | — | None released | | | — |
| South Carolina | TDS | — | — | — | — | — | — | — | — | — | — | — | — | — | — | — | — | — |
| UCF | USC | — | — | — | — | — | — | — | — | — | — | — | — | — | None released | | | — |
| UCF | TDS | — | — | — | — | — | — | — | — | — | — | — | — | — | 20 | 25 | 25 | 25 |
| West Virginia | USC | 16 | 10 | 6 | 15 | 13 | 10 | 8 | 4 | 3 | 10 | 19 | 16 | 17 | None released | | | 23 |
| West Virginia | TDS | 16 | 9 | 14 | 20 | 16 | 13 | 15 | 8 | 8 | 13 | 19 | 15 | 13 | 18 | 24 | 24 | 24 |

== Postseason ==
=== NCAA tournament ===
| Seed | School | First round | 2nd Round | 3rd Round | Quarterfinals | Semifinals | Championship |
|---|---|---|---|---|---|---|---|
| | UCF | W 3–2 vs. Florida Atlantic – (Orlando) | L 0–2 @ (7) Georgetown – (Washington) | | | | |
| | West Virginia | W 4–3 vs. St. John's – (Morgantown) | L 2–3 @ (10) High Point – (High Point) | | | | |
| | Marshall | W 1–0 vs. Cleveland State – (Huntington) | L 0–2 @ (15) NC State – (Raleigh) | | | | |
| | Kentucky | L 1–2 @ Saint Louis – (St. Louis) | | | | | |
| | W–L (%): | 3–1–0 (.750) | 0–3–0 (.000) | 0–0–0 (–) | 0–0–0 (–) | 0–0–0 (–) | 0–0–0 (–) Total: 3–4–0 (.429) |

== Awards ==
2025 Sun Belt Men's Soccer Individual Awards
| Award | Recipient(s) |
| Coach of the Year | Johan Cedergren – Kentucky |
| Player of the Year | Marcus Caldeira – West Virginia |
| Offensive Player of the Year | Marcus Caldeira – West Virginia |
| Defensive Player of the Year | Noah Holmstrom – Georgia Southern |
| Goalkeeper of the Year | Sebastian Conlon – Kentucky |
| Newcomer of the Year | Lilian Ricol – UCF |
| Freshman of the Year | Emil Seedorff – Georgia Southern |

2025 Sun Belt Men's Soccer All-Conference Teams
| First Team | Second Team | Freshman Team |
| F – Marcus Caldeira, West Virginia; F – Ricky Louis, Georgia Southern; F – Lilian Ricol, UCF; F – Pablo Pozos, West Virginia; MF – Clarence Awoudor, UCF; MF – Loed Klaasen, Coastal Carolina; MF – Agustin Lopez, Kentucky; DF – Takahiro Fujita, Marshall; DF – Noah Holmstrom, Georgia Southern; DF – Marqes Muir, Kentucky; GK – Sebastian Conlon, Kentucky | F – Ethan Ballek, South Carolina; F – Isaiah Chisolm, Kentucky; F – Lewis Rouke, Old Dominion; F – Alex Ruiz, Kentucky; MF – Kevin Larsson, Kentucky; MF – Nacho Martinez, West Virginia; MF – Rai Pinto, Marshall; DF – Felix Ewald, West Virginia; DF – Carlos Hernando, West Virginia; DF – David de la Vibora, Marshall; GK – Nate Martinez, Georgia Southern | F – Angel Lopez, Coastal Carolina; F – Seiryu Ono, UCF; F – Sammie Walker, West Virginia; MF – Juan Alvarez, West Virginia; MF – Marcus Andersen, Kentucky; MF – Matthew DeJianne, South Carolina; MF – Emil Seedorff, Georgia Southern; DF – Joao Alves, Marshall; DF – Loir Holtz, Georgia Southern; DF – Jem Hewlett, UCF; DF – David de la Vibora, Marshall |

== MLS SuperDraft ==
=== Total picks by school ===
| Team | Round 1 | Round 2 | Round 3 | Total |
|---|---|---|---|---|
| Coastal Carolina | – | – | – | – |
| Georgia Southern | 1 | 1 | – | 2 |
| Georgia State | – | – | – | – |
| James Madison | – | – | – | – |
| Kentucky | – | 1 | 1 | 2 |
| Marshall | – | – | – | – |
| Old Dominion | – | – | – | – |
| South Carolina | – | – | – | – |
| UCF | – | – | 1 | 1 |
| West Virginia | – | – | – | – |
| Total | 1 | 2 | 2 | 5 |

=== List of selections ===
| Round | Pick # | MLS team | Player | Position | College |
|---|---|---|---|---|---|
| 1 | 2 | FC Dallas | (Haiti) Ricky Louis | FW | Georgia Southern |
| 2 | 50 | Nashville SC | (United States) Max Miller | DF | Kentucky |
| 2 | 57 | New York City FC | (United States) Kevin Pierre | MF | Georgia Southern |
| 3 | 65 | LA Galaxy | (United States) Sebastian Conlon | GK | Kentucky |
| 3 | 71 | New York City FC | (United States) Joey Mueller | MF | UCF |
