= 2026 Kentucky Wildcats men's soccer team =

American college soccer season

2026 Kentucky Wildcats men's soccer
- Conference: Sun Belt Conference
- Record: 3–9–4 (3–4–2 Sun Belt)
- Head coach: Johan Cedergren (15th season)
- Assistant coaches: Ryan Zinkhan; Sean Lawlor (1st season); Jan Hoffelner
- Home stadium: Wendell & Vickie Bell Soccer Complex

2026 Sun Belt Conference men's soccer standings
	Conf.					Overall
Team	W		L		T	W		L		T
No. 9 West Virginia †	6	–	1	–	2	10	–	2	–	4
No. 14 Marshall †	6	–	1	–	2	10	–	2	–	4
UCF	5	–	3	–	1	9	–	4	–	3
James Madison	4	–	2	–	3	7	–	6	–	4
Coastal Carolina	4	–	3	–	2	6	–	6	–	4
No. 24 South Carolina	3	–	4	–	2	10	–	2	–	5
Kentucky	3	–	4	–	2	3	–	9	–	4
Georgia Southern	2	–	5	–	2	6	–	6	–	4
Old Dominion	2	–	6	–	1	10	–	6	–	1
Georgia State	1	–	7	–	1	7	–	9	–	2
† – Conference champion ‡ – 2026 Sun Belt Conference tournament champion + – At-large invitation to the 2026 NCAA tournament; As of November 3, 2026; Rankings from United Soccer Coaches; Source: Sun Belt

The 2026 Kentucky Wildcats men's soccer team represents the University of Kentucky during the 2026 NCAA Division I men's soccer season. The Wildcats are led by head coach Johan Cedergren, in his fifteenth season. They play their home games at the Wendell & Vickie Bell Soccer Complex in Lexington, Kentucky. This is the team's 36th season playing organized men's college soccer and their fifth playing in the Sun Belt Conference.

Coming off a Sun Belt regular-season title in 2025, the Wildcats were picked fourth in the Sun Belt preseason coaches' poll and received votes in the United Soccer Coaches preseason poll, returning ten players and adding sixteen newcomers. They opened with a 2–2 draw against Western Michigan and went winless in their first eight matches, a run that included a 3–2 home loss to Louisville and a 4–1 loss to third-ranked Ohio State in which goalkeeper Benjamin Rasmussen and forward Thomas Nielsen were sent off. Kentucky earned its first win of the season on October 2, beating 23rd-ranked Old Dominion 4–2. A four-match losing streak followed, including defeats at second-ranked Indiana, ninth-ranked South Carolina and 24th-ranked West Virginia, which left the Wildcats tenth in the Sun Belt standings with three conference matches remaining. They then drew 0–0 at James Madison and closed the regular season with wins over Georgia Southern on Senior Night and at Georgia State, securing a place in the conference tournament.

The Wildcats finished the regular season 3–9–4 and 3–4–2 in Sun Belt play. As the seventh seed in the Sun Belt Tournament, they will play at second seed Marshall in the Quarterfinals. Costa Iliadis leads the team with three goals.

== Previous season ==
The Wildcats finished the 2025 regular season 10–2–4 and 7–1–1 in Sun Belt play, winning the conference regular-season title. As the top seed in the Sun Belt Tournament, they beat eighth seed Coastal Carolina on penalty kicks in the Quarterfinals before losing 1–0 to fifth seed UCF in the Semifinals. The Wildcats received an at-large bid to the NCAA Tournament, where they lost 2–1 in double overtime at Saint Louis in the First Round to finish the season 10–4–5. Following the season, Sebastian Conlon and Max Miller were selected in the 2026 MLS SuperDraft.

== Player movement ==
=== Players leaving ===
Departures
Name	Number	Pos.	Height	Weight	Year	Hometown	Reason for Departure
Hayden Owens	1	GK	6'4"	185	Junior	Frisco, Texas	—
Josh Gordon	2	DF	6'0"	185	Junior	Scarborough, Ontario	Transferred to NC State
Marqes Muir	4	DF	6'1"	190	Junior	London, England	—
Dan McHale	5	DF	6'3"	195	Freshman	Dublin, Ireland	—
Oliver Stavdal	8	MF	5'11"	175	Sophomore	Moss, Norway	Transferred to Florida International
Isaiah Chisolm	9	FW	6'3"	205	Junior	Yorktown, Virginia	Transferred to Ohio State
Kevin Larsson	11	MF	5'9"	160	Senior	Helsinki, Finland	Graduated
Alex Ruiz	14	MF	5'10"	160	Graduate Student	Valencia, Spain	Graduated
Kaden Pollard	19	MF	5'11"	150	Sophomore	Manhattan, New York	—
Danny Isaac	20	FW	6'1"	170	Freshman	London, England	—
Mekhi Haughton-Parris	21	DF	5'8"	140	Freshman	Reading, England	—
Owen Mikoy	22	DF	6'5"	210	Graduate Student	Atlanta, Georgia	Graduated
Luke Shreiner	23	DF	6'3"	190	Sophomore	Dallas, Texas	—
Sebastian Conlon	24	GK	6'2"	180	Senior	Reston, Virginia	Selected 65th overall in the 2026 MLS SuperDraft
Tiago Honorio Jr.	25	FW	6'4"	175	Senior	São Paulo, Brazil	Graduated
Joaquin Brizuela	29	FW	6'2"	180	Sophomore	Mendoza, Argentina	—

Max Miller was selected 50th overall by Nashville SC in the 2026 MLS SuperDraft but returned to Kentucky for the 2026 season.

=== Players arriving ===
==== Incoming transfers ====
Incoming transfers
Name	Number	Pos.	Height	Weight	Year	Hometown	Previous School
Ben Nash	2	DF	5'11"	155	Sophomore	Edmonton, Canada	Penn State
Cianole Nguepissi	6	DF	6'2"	205	Junior	Birmingham, England	San Diego State
Yasha Schaerer	8	MF	5'8"	160	Senior	Zürich, Switzerland	Marshall
Michael Lee	14	MF	5'9"	155	Junior	Toronto, Canada	Louisville
Fredrik Skilberg	15	FW	5'11"	165	Graduate Student	Stockholm, Sweden	SMU
Max Schrader	19	DF	6'1"	160	Junior	Cherry Hill, New Jersey	Rider
Costa Iliadis	22	FW	6'0"	175	Freshman	Toronto, Canada	Clemson

==== Recruiting class ====
Name	Nat.	Hometown	Previous club
Gilles Monti; GK	SUI	Bienne, Switzerland	FC La Chaux-de-Fonds
Bernardo Bucci; DF	ITA	Città di Castello, Italy	Trestina
Thomas Nielsen; FW	DEN	Copenhagen, Denmark	FC Helsingør
Thomas Berteotti; MF	BEL	Wallonia, Belgium	RAAL La Louvière U23
Ilan Ettinger; DF	USA	Atlanta, Georgia	Atlanta United Academy
Tom Keller; FW	GER	Neunkirchen, Germany	FC Ingolstadt U19
Mats Brune; MF	GER	Witten, Germany	SC Wiedenbrück
Benjamin Rasmussen; GK	DEN	Haderslev, Denmark	SønderjyskE U19
Ari Saliu; MF	USA	Chicago, Illinois	Nashville SC Academy

== Squad ==
=== Roster ===
As of November 6, 2026

Note: Flags indicate national team as defined under FIFA eligibility rules; some limited exceptions apply. Players may hold more than one non-FIFA nationality.

No.	Pos.	Nation	Player
1	GK	SUI	Gilles Monti
2	DF	CAN	Ben Nash
3	DF	USA	Max Miller
4	DF	GER	Sinan Solmaz
5	DF	ITA	Bernardo Bucci
6	DF	ENG	Cianole Nguepissi
7	MF	GER	Eric Onos
8	MF	SUI	Yasha Schaerer
9	FW	DEN	Thomas Nielsen
10	MF	ARG	Agustin Lopez
11	MF	BEL	Thomas Berteotti
12	FW	SWE	Gustav Renman
14	MF	CAN	Michael Lee

No.	Pos.	Nation	Player
15	FW	SWE	Fredrik Skilberg
16	FW	USA	Bains Smith
17	MF	DEN	Bertil Alban
18	MF	DEN	Marcus Andersen
19	DF	USA	Max Schrader
20	DF	USA	Ilan Ettinger
21	FW	GER	Tom Keller
22	FW	CAN	Costa Iliadis
23	MF	GER	Mats Brune
24	GK	DEN	Benjamin Rasmussen
26	DF	USA	JJ Vozar
29	MF	USA	Ari Saliu
30	GK	USA	Dillon Griner

=== Team management ===
Position	Staff
Head coach	(Sweden) Johan Cedergren
Associate head coach	Ryan Zinkhan
Assistant coach	Sean Lawlor
Assistant/goalkeeper coach	Jan Hoffelner
Director of operations & leadership development	Dustin Smith

== Schedule ==
Date Time, TV	Rank^{#}	Opponent^{#}	Result	Record	Site (Attendance) City, State
Regular season
August 20*; 7:30 p.m.		Western Michigan	T 2–2	0–0–1	Bell Soccer Complex (425); Lexington, KY
August 24*; 7:30 p.m.		Louisville; Battle in the Bluegrass	L 2–3	0–1–1	Bell Soccer Complex (2,407); Lexington, KY
August 28*; 6:00 p.m.		at Virginia Tech	L 0–3	0–2–1	Thompson Field (473); Blacksburg, VA
September 4*; 7:30 p.m.		Evansville	T 1–1	0–2–2	Bell Soccer Complex (1,423); Lexington, KY
September 8*; 7:30 p.m.		No. 3 Ohio State	L 1–4	0–3–2	Bell Soccer Complex (1,134); Lexington, KY
September 18; 7:30 p.m.		Marshall	L 0–1	0–4–2 (0–1–0)	Bell Soccer Complex (1,168); Lexington, KY
September 22*; 7:00 p.m.		at Lipscomb	L 1–2	0–5–2	Lipscomb Soccer Complex (132); Nashville, TN
September 27; 7:00 p.m.		at UCF	T 1–1	0–5–3 (0–1–1)	UCF Soccer Complex (453); Orlando, FL
October 2; 7:00 p.m.		No. 23 Old Dominion	W 4–2	1–5–3 (1–1–1)	Bell Soccer Complex (571); Lexington, KY
October 6*; 8:00 p.m.		at No. 2 Indiana	L 1–3	1–6–3	Bill Armstrong Stadium (2,608); Bloomington, IN
October 10; 3:00 p.m.		at No. 9 South Carolina	L 0–1	1–7–3 (1–2–1)	Stone Stadium (2,046); Columbia, SC
October 16; 7:00 p.m.		at No. 24 West Virginia	L 0–4	1–8–3 (1–3–1)	Dick Dlesk Soccer Stadium (1,017); Morgantown, WV
October 21; 7:00 p.m.		Coastal Carolina	L 1–2	1–9–3 (1–4–1)	Bell Soccer Complex (558); Lexington, KY
October 25; 6:00 p.m.		at James Madison	T 0–0	1–9–4 (1–4–2)	Sentara Park; Harrisonburg, VA
October 30; 7:00 p.m.		Georgia Southern	W 1–0	2–9–4 (2–4–2)	Bell Soccer Complex (588); Lexington, KY
November 3; 7:00 p.m.		at Georgia State	W 3–1	3–9–4 (3–4–2)	GSU Soccer Complex (100); Atlanta, GA
Sun Belt Tournament
November 8*; 3:00 p.m.	(7)	at (2) No. 14 Marshall; Quarterfinals			Hoops Family Field; Huntington, WV
*Non-conference game. ^{#}Rankings from United Soccer Coaches. (#) Tournament seedings in parentheses. All times are in Eastern.

== Goals record ==
Through November 3, 2026.

Rank	No.	Nat.	Po.	Name	Regular season	Sun Belt Tournament	NCAA Tournament	Total
1	22	(Canada)	FW	Costa Iliadis	3	0	0	3
2	8	(Switzerland)	MF	Yasha Schaerer	2	0	0	2
2	10	(Argentina)	MF	Agustin Lopez	2	0	0	2
2	14	(Canada)	MF	Michael Lee	2	0	0	2
2	16	(United States)	FW	Bains Smith	2	0	0	2
6	6	(England)	DF	Cianole Nguepissi	1	0	0	1
6	11	(Belgium)	MF	Thomas Berteotti	1	0	0	1
6	12	(Sweden)	FW	Gustav Renman	1	0	0	1
6	17	(Denmark)	MF	Bertil Alban	1	0	0	1
6	21	(Germany)	FW	Tom Keller	1	0	0	1
6	23	(Germany)	MF	Mats Brune	1	0	0	1
6	29	(United States)	MF	Ari Saliu	1	0	0	1
Total					18	0	0	18

== Disciplinary record ==
Through November 3, 2026. Does not include two cautions issued to the Kentucky coaching staff.

Rank	No.	Nat.	Po.	Name	Regular Season			Sun Belt Tournament			NCAA Tournament			Total		
Rank	No.	Nat.	Po.	Name	Yellow card	(yellow card) (yellow-red card)	Red card	Yellow card	(yellow card) (yellow-red card)	Red card	Yellow card	(yellow card) (yellow-red card)	Red card	Yellow card	(yellow card) (yellow-red card)	Red card
1	8	(Switzerland)	MF	Yasha Schaerer	5	0	0	0	0	0	0	0	0	5	0	0
2	22	(Canada)	FW	Costa Iliadis	3	0	1	0	0	0	0	0	0	3	0	1
3	23	(Germany)	MF	Mats Brune	4	0	0	0	0	0	0	0	0	4	0	0
4	6	(England)	DF	Cianole Nguepissi	3	0	0	0	0	0	0	0	0	3	0	0
4	16	(United States)	FW	Bains Smith	3	0	0	0	0	0	0	0	0	3	0	0
6	24	(Denmark)	GK	Benjamin Rasmussen	1	0	1	0	0	0	0	0	0	1	0	1
7	9	(Denmark)	FW	Thomas Nielsen	1	1	0	0	0	0	0	0	0	1	1	0
8	17	(Denmark)	MF	Bertil Alban	2	0	0	0	0	0	0	0	0	2	0	0
8	18	(Denmark)	MF	Marcus Andersen	2	0	0	0	0	0	0	0	0	2	0	0
8	19	(United States)	DF	Max Schrader	2	0	0	0	0	0	0	0	0	2	0	0
8	29	(United States)	MF	Ari Saliu	2	0	0	0	0	0	0	0	0	2	0	0
12	5	(Italy)	DF	Bernardo Bucci	1	0	0	0	0	0	0	0	0	1	0	0
12	14	(Canada)	MF	Michael Lee	1	0	0	0	0	0	0	0	0	1	0	0
12	26	(United States)	DF	JJ Vozar	1	0	0	0	0	0	0	0	0	1	0	0
Total					31	1	2	0	0	0	0	0	0	31	1	2

== Awards and honors ==
Recipient	Award	Date	Ref.
Agustin Lopez	Preseason All-Sun Belt Team	August 12	
Max Miller	Preseason All-Sun Belt Team	August 12	
Sinan Solmaz	Preseason All-Sun Belt Team	August 12	

== Rankings ==
Ranking movements Legend: ██ Increase in ranking ██ Decrease in ranking — = Not ranked RV = Received votes
	Week																
Poll	Pre	1	2	3	4	5	6	7	8	9	10	11	12	13	14	15	Final
United Soccer	RV	—	—	—	—	—	—	—	—	—	—	—		Not released			
TopDrawer Soccer	—	—	—	—	—	—	—	—	—	—	—	—	—				
College Soccer News	RV	RV	—	—	—	—	—	—	—	—	—	—			Not released		
