= 2026 Coastal Carolina Chanticleers men's soccer team =

American college soccer season

2026 Coastal Carolina Chanticleers men's soccer
- Conference: Sun Belt Conference
- Record: 7-6-4 (4-3-2 Sun Belt)
- Head coach: Adam Perron (1st season)
- Assistant coaches: Nick Melville (1st season); Will Lukowski (1st season); Chay Strine (1st season)
- Home stadium: CCU Soccer Complex

2026 Sun Belt Conference men's soccer standings
	Conf.					Overall
Team	W		L		T	W		L		T
No. 9 West Virginia †	6	–	1	–	2	10	–	2	–	4
No. 14 Marshall †	6	–	1	–	2	10	–	2	–	4
UCF	5	–	3	–	1	9	–	4	–	3
James Madison	4	–	2	–	3	7	–	6	–	4
Coastal Carolina	4	–	3	–	2	6	–	6	–	4
No. 24 South Carolina	3	–	4	–	2	10	–	2	–	5
Kentucky	3	–	4	–	2	3	–	9	–	4
Georgia Southern	2	–	5	–	2	6	–	6	–	4
Old Dominion	2	–	6	–	1	10	–	6	–	1
Georgia State	1	–	7	–	1	7	–	9	–	2
† – Conference champion ‡ – 2026 Sun Belt Conference tournament champion + – At-large invitation to the 2026 NCAA tournament; As of November 3, 2026; Rankings from United Soccer Coaches; Source: Sun Belt

The 2026 Coastal Carolina Chanticleers men's soccer team represented Coastal Carolina University during the 2026 NCAA Division I men's soccer season and the 2026 Sun Belt Conference men's soccer season. The regular season began on August 20 and concluded on November 1. It was the program's 49th season fielding a men's varsity soccer team, and their 11th season in the Sun Belt. The 2023 season was Adam Perron's 1st year as head coach for the program.

== Preseason ==
The preseason poll was released on August 12, 2026.

SBC preseason poll
Predicted finish	Team	Votes (1st place)
1	West Virginia	94 (4)
2	Marshall	87 (3)
3	UCF	81 (1)
4	Kentucky	76 (2)
5	Georgia Southern	55
6	South Carolina	41
7	Old Dominion	38
8	James Madison	29
9	Coastal Carolina	25
10	Georgia State	24

== Roster ==
As of August 20, 2026

Note: Flags indicate national team as defined under FIFA eligibility rules; some limited exceptions apply. Players may hold more than one non-FIFA nationality.

No.	Pos.	Nation	Player
1	GK	USA	Nash Skoglund
2	DF	ENG	Joe Wilcock
3	DF	USA	Patrick Kolano
4	DF	ENG	Theo Butterworth
5	DF	ESP	Hector Blanco
6	MF	ESP	Daniel Fiol
7	MF	USA	Sammy Murphy
8	MF	IRL	Daniel Idiakhoa
9	FW	ARG	Mateo Caride
10	MF	ESP	Alberto de Miguel
11	FW	USA	Patrick Shaw
12	FW	USA	Zach Hult
13	DF	USA	Alvin Depina

No.	Pos.	Nation	Player
16	DF	USA	Jackson Kelley
17	DF	USA	Kyle Pollard
18	MF	USA	Isaac Busenze
19	MF	USA	Pearse O'Brien
20	FW	GHA	Elvis Appiah
21	MF	USA	Brady Schumacher
22	DF	USA	Baxter Hunt
23	MF	ISL	Robert Valdimarsson
24	DF	USA	Parker Sturgis
25	MF	USA	Parker Jackson
30	GK	USA	Will Devine
31	GK	USA	Ben Hertel

== Schedule ==
Date Time, TV	Rank^{#}	Opponent^{#}	Result	Record	Team events	Opponent events	Site (Attendance) City, State
Non-conference regular season
August 20*; 7:30 pm, ESPN+		at No. 2 NC State	T 0-0	0-0-1	Appiah (yellow card) 23'; Sturgis (yellow card) 37'; Butterworth (yellow card) 64'; Schumacher (yellow card) 68'	Antonie (yellow card) 35'; Lovelance (yellow card) 80'; DeFrancesco (yellow card) 82'	Dail Soccer Field (3,147); Raleigh, NC
August 24*; 7:00 pm, ESPN+		at Longwood	L 2-4	0-1-1	Valdimarsson 34'; Hurt (yellow card) 40'; Idiakhoa (yellow card) 70'; Kolano 80'; Kolano (yellow card) 82'	Campbell 5'; Roda 37'; Gramajo (yellow card) 45'; Campbell 52'; Bedolla (yellow card) 57'; Serralde (yellow card) 61'; Hansen (yellow card) 61'; Ouattara (yellow card) 69'; Bedolla 75'	Longwood Athletics Complex (364); Farmville, VA
August 29*; 6:00 pm, ESPN+		Stetson	W 2-0	1-1-1	Hurt 9'; Caride (yellow card) 39'; Caride 68'; Murphy (yellow card) 71'	Perez (red card) 71'	CCU Soccer Complex (537); Conway, SC
September 5*; 6:00 pm, ESPN+		Gardner-Webb	L 1-2	1-2-1	Blanco (yellow card) 52'; O'Brien 69'	Kreuzpeintner 30'; Mansur 42'; Triguero (yellow card) 86'; Knoche (yellow card) 87'	CCU Soccer Complex (567); Conway, SC
September 9*; 6:00 pm, ESPN+		at North Florida	L 0-2	1-3-1	Murphy (yellow card) 33'; Butterworth (yellow card) 54'; O'Brien (yellow card) 81'	Neto 12'; Rios 33'	Hodges Stadium (529); Jacksonville, FL
Sun Belt Conference regular season
September 18; 6:00 pm, ESPN+		Georgia Southern	T 1-1	1-3-2 (0-0-1)			CCU Soccer Complex; Conway, SC
September 22*; 6:00 pm, ESPN+		at Wofford	T 1-1	1-3-3			Snyder Field; Spartanburg, SC
September 27; 6:00 pm, ESPN+		at Georgia State	T 1-1	1-3-4 (0-0-2)			GSU Soccer Field; Atlanta, GA
October 2; 7:00 pm, ESPN+		at James Madison	L 0-1	1-4-4 (0-1-2)			Harrisonburg, VA
October 6*; 6:00 pm, ESPN+		Campbell	W 4-2	2-4-4			CCU Soccer Complex; Conway, SC
October 9; 6:00 pm, ESPN+		UCF	W 2-1	3-4-4 (1-1-2)			CCU Soccer Complex; Conway, SC
October 17; 6:00 pm, ESPN+		Marshall	L 1-2	3-5-4 (1-2-2)			CCU Soccer Complex; Conway, SC
October 21; 7:00 pm, ESPN+		at Kentucky	W 2-1	4-5-4 (2-2-2)			Wendell & Vickie Bell Soccer Complex; Lexington, KY
October 25; 6:00 pm, ESPN+		Old Dominion	W 1-0	5-5-4 (3-2-2)			CCU Soccer Complex; Conway, SC
October 29; 7:00 pm, ESPN+		at No. 13 West Virginia	L 0-2	5-6-4 (3-3-2)			Dick Dlesk Soccer Stadium; Morgantown, WV
November 3; 6:00 pm, ESPN+		No. 24 South Carolina	W 2-1	6-6-4 (4-3-2)			CCU Soccer Complex (763); Conway, SC
Sun Belt Conference Tournament
November 8; 7:00 pm, ESPN+		vs. James Madison	W 2-1 ^{OT}	7-6-4			Dick Dlesk Soccer Stadium (121); Morgantown, WV
November 11; 7:00 pm, ESPN+		at West Virginia					Dick Dlesk Soccer Stadium; Morgantown, WV
*Non-conference game. ^{#}Rankings from United Soccer Coaches. (#) Tournament seedings in parentheses. All times are in Eastern Time.
