= 2026 South Carolina Gamecocks men's soccer team =

American college soccer season

2026 South Carolina Gamecocks men's soccer
- Conference: Sun Belt Conference
- U. Soc. Coaches poll: No. 24
- Record: 10–5–2 (3–4–2 Sun Belt)
- Head coach: Tony Annan (6th season)
- Assistant coaches: Nat Hubert; Josh Bronstorph; Jaxsen Wirth
- Home stadium: Stone Stadium

2026 Sun Belt Conference men's soccer standings
	Conf.					Overall
Team	W		L		T	W		L		T
No. 9 West Virginia †	6	–	1	–	2	10	–	2	–	4
No. 14 Marshall †	6	–	1	–	2	10	–	2	–	4
UCF	5	–	3	–	1	9	–	4	–	3
James Madison	4	–	2	–	3	7	–	6	–	4
Coastal Carolina	4	–	3	–	2	6	–	6	–	4
No. 24 South Carolina	3	–	4	–	2	10	–	2	–	5
Kentucky	3	–	4	–	2	3	–	9	–	4
Georgia Southern	2	–	5	–	2	6	–	6	–	4
Old Dominion	2	–	6	–	1	10	–	6	–	1
Georgia State	1	–	7	–	1	7	–	9	–	2
† – Conference champion ‡ – 2026 Sun Belt Conference tournament champion + – At-large invitation to the 2026 NCAA tournament; As of November 3, 2026; Rankings from United Soccer Coaches; Source: Sun Belt

The 2026 South Carolina Gamecocks men's soccer team represents the University of South Carolina during the 2026 NCAA Division I men's soccer season. The Gamecocks are led by head coach Tony Annan, in his sixth season. They play their home games at Stone Stadium in Columbia, South Carolina. This is the team's fifth season in the Sun Belt Conference, which they joined in 2022.

The Gamecocks were picked sixth in the Sun Belt Preseason Coaches Poll and were unranked nationally to start the season. They won their first seven matches, matching the program's 7–0 start in 2003, including a 3–2 home win over sixteenth-ranked Clemson in the rivalry match, road wins at twenty-fifth-ranked Charlotte and thirteenth-ranked Old Dominion, and a home win over fourteenth-ranked High Point. On September 22 South Carolina was unanimously ranked first in the United Soccer Coaches poll for the first time in program history, as the only team in the country without a loss or draw. The Gamecocks lost 2–1 at home to Charleston the same day, and went 3–5–2 over their final ten regular season matches. Highlights included a 7–0 win over Georgia Southern, but the regular season ended with three straight conference losses. Loïc Sany Kong was twice named Sun Belt Offensive Player of the Week, and Alejandro Velazquez-Lopez and Mika Habel also earned weekly honors.

South Carolina finished the regular season 10–5–2 and 3–4–2 in Sun Belt play, sixth in the conference. As the sixth seed in the Sun Belt Tournament, they will face third seed UCF in the Quarterfinals in Huntington, West Virginia. Habel, who led the Sun Belt with ten assists, was named Sun Belt Defensive Player of the Year, the first Gamecock to win a major Sun Belt postseason award. Velazquez-Lopez leads the team with seven goals.

== Background ==
The Gamecocks finished the 2025 season 7–9–2 and 1–6–2 in Sun Belt play, ninth of ten teams. They failed to qualify for the Sun Belt Tournament for the first time since joining the conference in 2022, and missed the NCAA Tournament for the tenth consecutive season.

== Player movement ==
=== Players leaving ===
Departures
Name	Number	Pos.	Height	Year	Hometown	Reason for Departure
Filip Versterre	1	GK	6'3"	Sophomore	Copenhagen, Denmark	—
Andrew Goldsworthy	2	DF	6'2"	Sixth Year	Bloomington, Indiana	Graduated
Riccardo Oddi	3	DF	5'11"	Freshman	Parma, Italy	—
Junior Saint Juste	4	DF	6'1"	Senior	Port-au-Prince, Haiti	Transferred to Memphis
William Nilsson	5	DF	6'2"	Senior	Helsingborg, Sweden	Graduated
Alexander Stjernegaard	8	MF	5'7"	Senior	Rungsted Kyst, Denmark	Graduated
Tyler Trimnal	9	FW	6'3"	Senior	Lancaster, South Carolina	Graduated
Ethan Ballek	10	MF	6'0"	Senior	Timnath, Colorado	Graduated
Jonah Biggar	13	MF	6'3"	Junior	Greer, South Carolina	—
Camden Kowalski	14	DF	6'2"	Redshirt Senior	Mundelein, Illinois	Graduated
Samy Kolby	17	MF	5'9"	Redshirt Junior	Charlotte, North Carolina	—
Galen Flynn	18	DF	6'0"	Fifth Year	West Hartford, Connecticut	Graduated
Keanan Bader	19	FW	5'10"	Junior	Apex, North Carolina	Transferred to Memphis
Ted Cargill	22	MF	6'0"	Senior	London, England	Graduated
Jordan Cheetham	24	DF	6'3"	Freshman	Nassau, Bahamas	—
Nash Skoglund	25	GK	6'0"	Redshirt Freshman	Dacula, Georgia	—
Oliver Townend	26	GK	6'1"	Redshirt Senior	Nassau, Bahamas	Graduated
Sonny Quintanilla	27	DF	5'9"	Sixth Year	Beaufort, South Carolina	Graduated
Micah Colodny	29	MF	5'8"	Junior	Colorado Springs, Colorado	—

=== Players arriving ===
==== Incoming transfers ====
Incoming transfers
Name	Number	Pos.	Height	Year	Hometown	Previous School
Noah Scheidweiler	1	GK	6'3"	Sophomore	Gasperich, Luxembourg	SIUE
Omar Robbana	3	DF	6'2"	Sophomore	Fort Lauderdale, Florida	Vermont
Arnar Adalsteinsson	4	DF	6'3"	Junior	Kópavogur, Iceland	Rutgers
Benjamin Wallis	5	DF	6'5"	Sophomore	Johannesburg, South Africa	UNLV
Angel Lopez	9	FW	6'3"	Sophomore	Seville, Spain	Coastal Carolina
Emil Seedorff	14	MF	6'1"	Sophomore	Frederikshavn, Denmark	Georgia Southern
Alex Shields	25	GK	6'3"	Fifth Year	San Diego, California	UC Irvine
Daniel Lang	26	DF	6'1"	Junior	Cologne, Germany	Fordham
Jack Kilstrom	27	GK	6'5"	Senior	Bettendorf, Iowa	Winthrop

==== Recruiting class ====
Name	Nat.	Hometown	Club / High school
Jamie Grayson; DF	ENG	Manchester, England	—
Hugo Febles; FW	ESP	Gran Canaria, Spain	—
Cristian Ortiz; FW	USA	Tampa, Florida	—
Keaton Pray; DF	USA	Dunwoody, Georgia	—
Oliver Armstrong; MF	ENG	Crewe, England	—
Adolfo Feoli; FW	CRC	San José, Costa Rica	—
Gustavo Feoli; FW	CRC	San José, Costa Rica	—
Yoni Perez; MF	ESP	Tenerife, Spain	—
Matt Vigor; MF	ENG	London, England	—

== Squad ==
=== Roster ===
As of November 7, 2026

Note: Flags indicate national team as defined under FIFA eligibility rules; some limited exceptions apply. Players may hold more than one non-FIFA nationality.

No.	Pos.	Nation	Player
1	GK	LUX	Noah Scheidweiler
2	DF	ENG	Jamie Grayson
3	DF	USA	Omar Robbana
4	DF	ISL	Arnar Adalsteinsson
5	DF	RSA	Benjamin Wallis
6	DF	GER	Mika Habel
7	FW	ESP	Hugo Febles
8	MF	CAN	Isaiah Whittaker-Francis
9	FW	ESP	Angel Lopez
10	MF	USA	Alejandro Velazquez-Lopez
11	FW	CAN	Loïc Sany Kong
12	FW	USA	Cristian Ortiz
13	DF	USA	Keaton Pray
14	MF	DEN	Emil Seedorff

No.	Pos.	Nation	Player
15	MF	ENG	Oliver Armstrong
16	FW	USA	Matthew DeJianne
17	FW	CRC	Adolfo Feoli
18	FW	CRC	Gustavo Feoli
19	MF	ESP	Yoni Perez
20	DF	FRA	Yvan Malarte
21	MF	USA	Kieran Karp
22	MF	ENG	Matt Vigor
23	DF	USA	Shawn Lanza
25	GK	USA	Alex Shields
26	DF	GER	Daniel Lang
27	GK	USA	Jack Kilstrom
30	FW	USA	Gabriel Nickerson

=== Team management ===
Position	Staff
Head coach	Tony Annan
Associate head coach	Nat Hubert
Assistant coach	Josh Bronstorph
Assistant coach	Jaxsen Wirth

== Schedule ==
Date Time, TV	Rank^{#}	Opponent^{#}	Result	Record	Site (Attendance) City, State
Regular season
August 20*; 6:00 p.m.		at North Florida	W 4–1	1–0–0	Hodges Stadium (504); Jacksonville, FL
August 24*; 7:00 p.m.		USC Upstate	W 4–0	2–0–0	Stone Stadium (5,489); Columbia, SC
August 28*; 7:00 p.m.		No. 16 Clemson; Rivalry	W 3–2	3–0–0	Stone Stadium (7,671); Columbia, SC
September 3*; 7:00 p.m.	No. 13	at No. 25 Charlotte	W 2–1	4–0–0	Jen Gaber Field (1,215); Charlotte, NC
September 7*; 7:00 p.m.	No. 13	No. 14 High Point	W 2–0	5–0–0	Stone Stadium (4,628); Columbia, SC
September 11*; 7:00 p.m., ESPN+	No. 6	UNC Greensboro	W 1–0	6–0–0	Stone Stadium (2,911); Columbia, SC
September 18; 7:00 p.m.	No. 4	at No. 13 Old Dominion	W 2–1	7–0–0 (1–0–0)	ODU Soccer Complex (1,286); Norfolk, VA
September 22*; 7:00 p.m.	No. 1	Charleston	L 1–2	7–1–0	Stone Stadium (2,586); Columbia, SC
September 27; 7:00 p.m.	No. 1	James Madison	T 1–1	7–1–1 (1–0–1)	Stone Stadium (3,594); Columbia, SC
October 3; 7:00 p.m.	No. 11	at No. 16 West Virginia	T 1–1	7–1–2 (1–0–2)	Dick Dlesk Soccer Stadium (1,928); Morgantown, WV
October 10; 3:00 p.m.	No. 9	Kentucky	W 1–0	8–1–2 (2–0–2)	Stone Stadium (2,046); Columbia, SC
October 12*; 7:00 p.m.	No. 9	Columbia College	W 3–0	9–1–2	Stone Stadium (4,480); Columbia, SC
October 17; 7:00 p.m.	No. 6	at Georgia State	L 1–2	9–2–2 (2–1–2)	GSU Soccer Complex (100); Atlanta, GA
October 21; 7:00 p.m.	No. 18	Georgia Southern	W 7–0	10–2–2 (3–1–2)	Stone Stadium (1,832); Columbia, SC
October 25; 5:00 p.m.	No. 18	at UCF	L 2–3	10–3–2 (3–2–2)	UCF Soccer Complex (462); Orlando, FL
October 30; 7:00 p.m., ESPN+	No. 23	No. 21 Marshall	L 1–2	10–4–2 (3–3–2)	Stone Stadium (1,825); Columbia, SC
November 3; 6:00 p.m.	No. 24	at Coastal Carolina	L 1–2	10–5–2 (3–4–2)	Coastal Carolina Soccer Stadium (763); Conway, SC
Sun Belt Tournament
November 8*; 7:00 p.m.	(6) No. 24	vs. (3) UCF; Quarterfinals			Huntington, WV
*Non-conference game. ^{#}Rankings from United Soccer Coaches. (#) Tournament seedings in parentheses. All times are in Eastern.

== Goals record ==
Through November 3, 2026.

Rank	No.	Nat.	Po.	Name	Regular season	Sun Belt Tournament	NCAA Tournament	Total
1	10	(United States)	MF	Alejandro Velazquez-Lopez	7	0	0	7
2	9	(Spain)	FW	Angel Lopez	5	0	0	5
2	11	(Canada)	FW	Loïc Sany Kong	5	0	0	5
4	12	(United States)	FW	Cristian Ortiz	4	0	0	4
5	2	(England)	DF	Jamie Grayson	3	0	0	3
6	6	(Germany)	DF	Mika Habel	2	0	0	2
6	14	(Denmark)	MF	Emil Seedorff	2	0	0	2
6	20	(France)	DF	Yvan Malarte	2	0	0	2
6	30	(United States)	FW	Gabriel Nickerson	2	0	0	2
10	15	(England)	MF	Oliver Armstrong	1	0	0	1
10	16	(United States)	FW	Matthew DeJianne	1	0	0	1
10	22	(England)	MF	Matt Vigor	1	0	0	1
10	26	(Germany)	DF	Daniel Lang	1	0	0	1
Own goals					1	0	0	1
Total					37	0	0	37

== Disciplinary record ==
Through November 3, 2026. Does not include six cautions issued to the South Carolina bench.

Rank	No.	Nat.	Po.	Name	Regular Season			Sun Belt Tournament			NCAA Tournament			Total		
Rank	No.	Nat.	Po.	Name	Yellow card	(yellow card) (yellow-red card)	Red card	Yellow card	(yellow card) (yellow-red card)	Red card	Yellow card	(yellow card) (yellow-red card)	Red card	Yellow card	(yellow card) (yellow-red card)	Red card
1	8	(Canada)	MF	Isaiah Whittaker-Francis	5	0	0	0	0	0	0	0	0	5	0	0
2	3	(United States)	DF	Omar Robbana	4	0	0	0	0	0	0	0	0	4	0	0
2	12	(United States)	FW	Cristian Ortiz	4	0	0	0	0	0	0	0	0	4	0	0
4	1	(Luxembourg)	GK	Noah Scheidweiler	3	0	0	0	0	0	0	0	0	3	0	0
4	11	(Canada)	FW	Loïc Sany Kong	3	0	0	0	0	0	0	0	0	3	0	0
4	22	(England)	MF	Matt Vigor	3	0	0	0	0	0	0	0	0	3	0	0
7	2	(England)	DF	Jamie Grayson	2	0	0	0	0	0	0	0	0	2	0	0
7	6	(Germany)	DF	Mika Habel	2	0	0	0	0	0	0	0	0	2	0	0
9	10	(United States)	MF	Alejandro Velazquez-Lopez	1	0	0	0	0	0	0	0	0	1	0	0
9	15	(England)	MF	Oliver Armstrong	1	0	0	0	0	0	0	0	0	1	0	0
9	19	(Spain)	MF	Yoni Perez	1	0	0	0	0	0	0	0	0	1	0	0
9	21	(United States)	MF	Kieran Karp	1	0	0	0	0	0	0	0	0	1	0	0
9	23	(United States)	DF	Shawn Lanza	1	0	0	0	0	0	0	0	0	1	0	0
9	30	(United States)	FW	Gabriel Nickerson	1	0	0	0	0	0	0	0	0	1	0	0
Total					32	0	0	0	0	0	0	0	0	32	0	0

== Awards and honors ==
Recipient	Award	Date	Ref.
Loïc Sany Kong	Sun Belt Offensive Player of the Week	August 25	
Alejandro Velazquez-Lopez	Sun Belt Offensive Player of the Week	September 1	
Mika Habel	Sun Belt Defensive Player of the Week	September 15	
Loïc Sany Kong	Sun Belt Offensive Player of the Week	September 22	
Mika Habel	Sun Belt Defensive Player of the Year	November 6	
Mika Habel	All-Sun Belt First Team	November 6	
Alejandro Velazquez-Lopez	All-Sun Belt First Team	November 6	
Cristian Ortiz	All-Sun Belt Second Team	November 6	
Yoni Perez	Sun Belt All-Freshman Team	November 6	

== Rankings ==
Ranking movements Legend: ██ Increase in ranking ██ Decrease in ranking — = Not ranked RV = Received votes
	Week																
Poll	Pre	1	2	3	4	5	6	7	8	9	10	11	12	13	14	15	Final
United Soccer	—	—	13	6	4	1	11	9	6	18	23	24		Not released			
TopDrawer Soccer	—	—	—	5	3	1	1	11	16	12	20	24	—				
College Soccer News	—	RV	20	11	7	4	5	8	6	9	15	21			Not released		
