= 2026 Sun Belt Conference men's soccer tournament =

American college soccer postseason tournament

- Classification: Division I
- Teams: 8
- Matches: 7
- Attendance: 8,572
- Site: Morgantown, WV; Huntington, WV
- Champions: West Virginia (2nd title)
- Winning coach: Dan Stratford (2nd title)
- MVP: Pablo Pozos (West Virginia)
- Broadcast: ESPN+

2026 Sun Belt Conference men's soccer standings
	Conf.					Overall
Team	W		L		T	W		L		T
No. 7 West Virginia †	6	–	1	–	2	10	–	2	–	4
No. 10 Marshall †	6	–	1	–	2	10	–	2	–	4
UCF	5	–	3	–	1	9	–	4	–	3
James Madison	4	–	2	–	3	7	–	6	–	4
Coastal Carolina	4	–	3	–	2	6	–	6	–	4
South Carolina	3	–	4	–	2	10	–	2	–	5
Kentucky	3	–	4	–	2	3	–	9	–	4
Georgia Southern	2	–	5	–	2	6	–	6	–	4
Old Dominion	2	–	6	–	1	10	–	6	–	1
Georgia State	1	–	7	–	1	7	–	9	–	2
† – Conference champion ‡ – 2026 Sun Belt Conference tournament champion + – At-large invitation to the 2026 NCAA tournament; As of November 3, 2026; Rankings from United Soccer Coaches; Source: Sun Belt

The 2026 Sun Belt Conference men's soccer tournament was the 32nd edition of the Sun Belt Conference men's soccer tournament. The tournament ran from November 8 to November 15, 2026. The UCF Knights were the defending champions. West Virginia defeated sixth seeded South Carolina 4–0 in the final.

The conference announced the top two seeds would host the quarterfinals and semifinal rounds, and then the highest remaining seed in the finals would host the finals. #1 seed West Virginia and #2 seed Marshall earned the right to host the first two rounds of the tournament.

== Seeds ==
Tiebreakers were used to determine the seedings of teams who finished with identical conference records. A tiebreaker was required to determine the first and second seeds as West Virginia and Marshall both finished with 6–1–2 conference records. West Virginia won the tiebreaker due to having a +12 goal difference against common opponents, with Marshall having a +5 goal difference.

Seed	School	Conference	Points
1	West Virginia	6–1–2	20
2	Marshall	6–1–2	20
3	UCF	5–3–1	16
4	James Madison	4–2–3	15
5	Coastal Carolina	4–3–2	14
6	South Carolina	3–4–2	11
7	Kentucky	3–4–2	11
8	Georgia Southern	2–5–2	8

== Bracket ==
Quarterfinals; Sunday, Nov. 8
1	West Virginia	4
8	Georgia Southern	0
4	James Madison	1
5	Coastal Carolina	2 (a.e.t.)
2	Marshall	4
7	Kentucky	1
3	UCF	1
6	South Carolina	2

Semifinals; Wednesday, Nov. 11
1	West Virginia	1 (a.e.t.)
5	Coastal Carolina	0
2	Marshall	3
6	South Carolina	4 (a.e.t.)

Final; Sunday, Nov. 15
1	West Virginia	4
6	South Carolina	0

== Schedule ==
=== Quarterfinals ===
November 8, 2026	#1 West Virginia	4–0	#8 Georgia Southern	Morgantown, WV
3:00 p.m. EST	Pablo Pozos 9', 82'; Juan Alvarez 80'; Sammie Walker 86'	Report	(yellow card) 54' Julien Seher; (yellow card) 77' Alan Flores; (yellow card) 89' Mitch Picksley	Stadium: Dick Dlesk Soccer Stadium; Attendance: 1,467; Referee: Arthur de Moura Rodrigues de Souza; Assistant referees: Erik Blackburn; Aaron Fong; Fourth official: Justin Parnicza

November 8, 2026	#4 James Madison	1–2 (a.e.t.)	#5 Coastal Carolina	Morgantown, WV
7:00 p.m. EST	Daniel Bunk (yellow card) 20'; Dylan Randazzo 44'; Ikenna Nnawuchi (yellow card) 50' (yellow-red card) 55'; Hakon Rake (red card) 67'; Team (yellow card) 70'	Report	(yellow card) 35' Hector Blanco; (yellow card) 69' Pearse O'Brien; 69' (pen.) (yellow card) 70' Mateo Caride; 108' Daniel Idiakhoa	Stadium: Dick Dlesk Soccer Stadium; Attendance: 121; Referee: Mark Remse; Assistant referees: Ross Kleinstuber; Kofi Boateng; Fourth official: Geoffrey Petsko

November 8, 2026	#2 Marshall	4–1	#7 Kentucky	Huntington, WV
3:00 p.m. EST	Carl Romberg 11'; Haruhi Taneda 22'; Adam N'Goran 77'; Joao Roberto 78'	Report	65' Thomas Berteotti	Stadium: Hoops Family Field; Attendance: 1,964; Referee: Mario Maric; Assistant referees: Iziah Ciampanella; Alex Perez; Fourth official: Ali Sadeghian

November 8, 2026	#3 UCF	1–2	#6 South Carolina	Huntington, WV
7:00 p.m. EST	Kenn Muendo 41'; Joey Mueller (yellow card) 58'	Report	28' Angel Lopez; 64' Daniel Lang; (yellow card) 89' Shawn Lanza	Stadium: Hoops Family Field; Attendance: 61; Referee: Joshua Brooks; Assistant referees: Chad Collins; Luke Sobota; Fourth official: Adam Walters

=== Semifinals ===
November 11, 2026	#1 West Virginia	1–0 (a.e.t.)	#5 Coastal Carolina	Morgantown, WV
7:00 p.m. EST	Jacob Redenfors (yellow card) 24'; Team (red card) 85'; Civan de Jesus Ferreira 96'	Report	(yellow card) 34' Parker Sturgis; (yellow card) 42' Theo Butterworth; (yellow card) 42' Team; (yellow card) 43' (yellow-red card) 57' Alberto de Miguel; (yellow card) 57' Team; (yellow card) 75' Sammy Murphy	Stadium: Dick Dlesk Soccer Stadium; Attendance: 1,237; Referee: Sorin Stoica; Assistant referees: James Duling; Chris Regan; Fourth official: Sam Reynolds

November 11, 2026	#2 Marshall	3–4 (a.e.t.)	#6 South Carolina	Huntington, WV
7:00 p.m. EST	Ramado Pierre-Louis 9'; Joao Roberto 40' (yellow card) 40'; Stan Klaver 44'; Nikita Pakhomov (yellow card) 79'	Report	(yellow card) 31' Hugo Febles; 63', 91' Omar Robbana; 66' Daniel Lang; 77' Angel Lopez; (yellow card) 88' Alejandro Velazquez-Lopez; (yellow card) 89' Isaiah Whittaker-Francis	Stadium: Hoops Family Field; Attendance: 2,009; Referee: Nickrod Fateh; Assistant referees: Michael Nickerson; Kyle Maust; Fourth official: Alex Ryan

=== Final ===
November 15, 2026	#1 West Virginia	4–0	#6 South Carolina	Morgantown, WV
1:00 p.m. EST	Pablo Pozos 25', 50' (pen.); Julen Recalde 34'; Sebastian Burke (yellow card) 43'; Kanta Ishii (yellow card) 46'; Harry Hogben (yellow card) 64'; Nacho Martinez 71'; Jacob Redenfors (yellow card) 88'	Report	(yellow card) 18' Mika Habel; (yellow card) 33' Angel Lopez; (yellow card) 50' Matt Vigor	Stadium: Dick Dlesk Soccer Stadium; Attendance: 1,713; Referee: Kevin Fikar; Assistant referees: Erik Blackburn; Kevin Charlton; Fourth official: Geoffrey Petsko

== Statistics ==
=== Goalscorers ===
There were 27 goals scored in 7 matches, for an average of 3.86 goals per match.

4 goals

- Pablo Pozos – West Virginia

2 goals

- Daniel Lang – South Carolina
- Angel Lopez – South Carolina
- Omar Robbana – South Carolina
- Joao Roberto – Marshall

1 goal

- Juan Alvarez – West Virginia
- Thomas Berteotti – Kentucky
- Mateo Caride – Coastal Carolina
- Civan de Jesus Ferreira – West Virginia
- Daniel Idiakhoa – Coastal Carolina
- Stan Klaver – Marshall
- Nacho Martinez – West Virginia
- Kenn Muendo – UCF
- Adam N'Goran – Marshall
- Ramado Pierre-Louis – Marshall
- Dylan Randazzo – James Madison
- Julen Recalde – West Virginia
- Carl Romberg – Marshall
- Haruhi Taneda – Marshall
- Sammie Walker – West Virginia

== All-Tournament team ==
Player	Team
Theo Butterworth	Coastal Carolina
Nash Skoglund	Coastal Carolina
Joao Alves	Marshall
Joao Roberto	Marshall
Mika Habel	South Carolina
Daniel Lang	South Carolina
Angel Lopez	South Carolina
Aurelien Cormier	West Virginia
Civan de Jesus Ferreira	West Virginia
Harry Hogben	West Virginia
Nacho Martinez	West Virginia
**Pablo Pozos**	West Virginia

MVP in bold
