= 2026 UCF Knights men's soccer team =

American college soccer season

2026 UCF Knights men's soccer
- Conference: Sun Belt Conference
- Record: 9–4–3 (5–3–1 Sun Belt)
- Head coach: Scott Calabrese (10th season)
- Assistant coaches: Paul Souders; Austin Nyquist; Nick Jaramillo
- Home stadium: UCF Soccer Complex

2026 Sun Belt Conference men's soccer standings
	Conf.					Overall
Team	W		L		T	W		L		T
No. 9 West Virginia †	6	–	1	–	2	10	–	2	–	4
No. 14 Marshall †	6	–	1	–	2	10	–	2	–	4
UCF	5	–	3	–	1	9	–	4	–	3
James Madison	4	–	2	–	3	7	–	6	–	4
Coastal Carolina	4	–	3	–	2	6	–	6	–	4
No. 24 South Carolina	3	–	4	–	2	10	–	2	–	5
Kentucky	3	–	4	–	2	3	–	9	–	4
Georgia Southern	2	–	5	–	2	6	–	6	–	4
Old Dominion	2	–	6	–	1	10	–	6	–	1
Georgia State	1	–	7	–	1	7	–	9	–	2
† – Conference champion ‡ – 2026 Sun Belt Conference tournament champion + – At-large invitation to the 2026 NCAA tournament; As of November 3, 2026; Rankings from United Soccer Coaches; Source: Sun Belt

The 2026 UCF Knights men's soccer team represents the University of Central Florida during the 2026 NCAA Division I men's soccer season. The Knights are led by head coach Scott Calabrese, in his tenth season. They play their home games at the UCF Soccer Complex in Orlando, Florida, as members of the Sun Belt Conference.

The Knights entered the season as reigning Sun Belt Tournament champions and were picked third in the Sun Belt Preseason Coaches Poll, with Marshall transfer Takahiro Fujita named Preseason Defensive Player of the Year and Wisconsin transfer Matisse Hébert Preseason Goalkeeper of the Year. UCF kept clean sheets in each of its first three matches before a 4–1 home loss to eighteenth-ranked Clemson. Drew Hansen scored a hat-trick in a 6–0 win over Florida Polytechnic, but the Knights won only one of their first four Sun Belt matches. A 3–2 home win over eighteenth-ranked South Carolina, in which Hansen scored twice, began a closing run of three straight wins, ending with Hansen's game-winner at Georgia Southern. Hansen, a fourth-year forward who had started five matches in his previous two seasons, led the Sun Belt with twelve goals and was named Sun Belt Offensive Player of the Week three straight times to close the regular season.

The Knights finished the regular season 9–4–3 and 5–3–1 in Sun Belt play. As the third seed in the Sun Belt Tournament, they will face sixth seed South Carolina in the Quarterfinals at Hoops Family Field in Huntington, West Virginia. Hansen was named Sun Belt Player of the Year, and Fujita and Gwendal Degorce joined him on the All-Sun Belt First Team.

== Background ==
UCF began the 2025 season 2–5–1 before going 9–2–2 over its final thirteen matches. As the fifth seed in the Sun Belt Tournament, the Knights won three straight road matches, beating Georgia Southern, top seed Kentucky and Marshall, to claim the program's first Sun Belt title and the conference's automatic bid to the NCAA Tournament. They defeated Florida Atlantic 3–2 at home in the First Round before their season ended against seventh seed Georgetown, finishing 11–7–3. Joey Mueller was selected 71st overall by New York City FC in the 2026 MLS SuperDraft, but returned to UCF for the 2026 season.

== Player movement ==
=== Players leaving ===
Departures
Name	Number	Pos.	Height	Year	Hometown	Reason for Departure
Alex Smith	2	DF	6'0"	Fifth Year	Jacksonville, Florida	Graduated
Malick Thiaw	7	FW	6'1"	Senior	Marseille, France	Graduated
Claudel N'goubou	9	FW	6'5"	Senior	Auray, France	Graduated
Clarence Awoudor	10	FW	5'7"	Senior	Saint-Lô, France	Graduated
Sora Funakoshi	11	FW	5'9"	Senior	Nishinomiya, Japan	Graduated
Juanvi Muñoz	13	GK	6'0"	Senior	Valencia, Spain	Graduated
Fabio Guerreiro	14	MF	5'6"	Senior	Faro, Portugal	Graduated
Frederic Benedix	17	FW	5'8"	Senior	Riesa, Germany	Graduated
Lilian Ricol	20	FW	6'2"	Junior	Paris, France	—
Arne Michaelis	23	DF	6'0"	Junior	Krefeld, Germany	—
Yordan Torres	24	DF	5'9"	Freshman	Rockledge, Florida	—
Marcelo Lacayo	31	GK	6'2"	Freshman	San José, Costa Rica	—
Mikael Pulkkinen	34	DF	6'0"	Freshman	Helsinki, Finland	—

=== Players arriving ===
==== Incoming transfers ====
Incoming transfers
Name	Number	Pos.	Height	Year	Hometown	Previous School
Christian Hatley	9	FW	5'9"	Fifth Year	Nottingham, England	Lander
Matisse Hébert	13	GK	6'4"	Junior	Saint-Jérôme, Quebec	Wisconsin
Joachim Kyei	14	MF	5'8"	Sophomore	Kumasi, Ghana	Daytona State
Hugo Vien	20	MF	5'10"	Senior	Marseille, France	Limestone
Takahiro Fujita	29	DF	6'2"	Senior	Kawai, Japan	Marshall

==== Recruiting class ====
Name	Nat.	Hometown	Club / High school
Leny Jérôme; DF	FRA	Boulogne-sur-Mer, France	—
Alex Partera; FW	ESP	Barcelona, Spain	Escola Turbula
Hugo Vogel; DF	FRA	Lyon, France	—
Erik Vázquez; FW	ESP	Begur, Spain	Real Madrid
Sena Yamamoto; MF	JPN	Uji, Japan	Kokoku High School
Kai Longanecker; GK	USA	Sandpoint, Idaho	Sandpoint High School
Germán Moreno; DF	ESP	Sant Vicenç de Montalt, Spain	—
Alex Naranjo; FW	USA	Miami, Florida	Miami FC

== Squad ==
=== Roster ===
As of November 7, 2026

Note: Flags indicate national team as defined under FIFA eligibility rules; some limited exceptions apply. Players may hold more than one non-FIFA nationality.

No.	Pos.	Nation	Player
1	GK	GER	Timo Haböck
2	DF	FRA	Leny Jérôme
3	DF	FRA	Gwendal Degorce
4	DF	ENG	Jem Hewlett
5	MF	FRA	Younes Boudinar
6	MF	USA	Joey Mueller
7	FW	JPN	Seiryu Ono
8	MF	NOR	Petter Wingsternaes
9	FW	ENG	Christian Hatley
11	FW	ESP	Alex Partera
12	DF	USA	Gabi Velez
13	GK	CAN	Matisse Hébert
14	MF	GHA	Joachim Kyei
15	MF	LBR	Abraham Monsee

No.	Pos.	Nation	Player
16	DF	CRC	Timothy Arias
17	DF	FRA	Hugo Vogel
18	FW	USA	Drew Hansen
19	FW	ESP	Izán Martínez
20	MF	FRA	Hugo Vien
21	MF	USA	Finn Calloway
23	FW	ESP	Erik Vázquez
25	MF	JPN	Sena Yamamoto
28	MF	KEN	Kenn Muendo
29	DF	JPN	Takahiro Fujita
30	GK	USA	Kai Longanecker
32	DF	ESP	Germán Moreno
33	DF	USA	Mateus Dejesus
36	FW	USA	Alex Naranjo

=== Team management ===
Position	Staff
Head coach	Scott Calabrese
Associate head coach	Paul Souders
Assistant coach / Recruiting coordinator	Austin Nyquist
Assistant coach / Goalkeepers	Nick Jaramillo

== Schedule ==
Date Time, TV	Rank^{#}	Opponent^{#}	Result	Record	Site (Attendance) City, State
Regular season
August 20*; 7:00 p.m., ESPN+		Boston University	W 1–0	1–0–0	UCF Soccer Complex (390); Orlando, FL
August 23*; 6:00 p.m., ESPN+		at Florida Atlantic	T 0–0	1–0–1	FAU Soccer Stadium (538); Boca Raton, FL
August 28*; 7:00 p.m., ESPN+		South Florida	W 2–0	2–0–1	UCF Soccer Complex (727); Orlando, FL
September 1*; 7:00 p.m., ESPN+		No. 18 Clemson	L 1–4	2–1–1	UCF Soccer Complex (967); Orlando, FL
September 6*; 4:00 p.m., ESPN+		Florida Polytechnic	W 6–0	3–1–1	UCF Soccer Complex (387); Orlando, FL
September 11*; 3:00 p.m., ESPN+		at VCU	W 2–0	4–1–1	VCU Athletic Village (281); Richmond, VA
September 18; 7:00 p.m., ESPN+		at James Madison	L 0–1	4–2–1 (0–1–0)	Sentara Park (523); Harrisonburg, VA
September 22*; 7:00 p.m., ESPN+		at Stetson	T 1–1	4–2–2	Stetson Athletic Training Center (623); DeLand, FL
September 27; 4:00 p.m., ESPN+		Kentucky	T 1–1	4–2–3 (0–1–1)	UCF Soccer Complex (453); Orlando, FL
October 3; 7:00 p.m., ESPN+		Marshall	W 4–0	5–2–3 (1–1–1)	UCF Soccer Complex (607); Orlando, FL
October 9; 6:00 p.m., ESPN+		at Coastal Carolina	L 1–2	5–3–3 (1–2–1)	Coastal Carolina Soccer Stadium (413); Conway, SC
October 17; 7:00 p.m., ESPN+		Old Dominion	W 5–1	6–3–3 (2–2–1)	UCF Soccer Complex (611); Orlando, FL
October 21; 7:00 p.m., ESPN+		at No. 25 West Virginia	L 0–3	6–4–3 (2–3–1)	Dick Dlesk Soccer Stadium (1,208); Morgantown, WV
October 25; 5:00 p.m., ESPN+		No. 18 South Carolina	W 3–2	7–4–3 (3–3–1)	UCF Soccer Complex (462); Orlando, FL
October 29; 7:00 p.m., ESPN+		Georgia State	W 5–1	8–4–3 (4–3–1)	UCF Soccer Complex (367); Orlando, FL
November 3; 7:00 p.m., ESPN+		at Georgia Southern	W 2–1	9–4–3 (5–3–1)	Eagle Field (258); Statesboro, GA
Sun Belt Tournament
November 8*; 7:00 p.m., ESPN+	(3)	vs. (6) No. 24 South Carolina; Quarterfinals			Hoops Family Field; Huntington, WV
*Non-conference game. ^{#}Rankings from United Soccer Coaches. (#) Tournament seedings in parentheses. All times are in Eastern.

== Goals record ==
Through November 3, 2026.

Rank	No.	Nat.	Po.	Name	Regular season	Sun Belt Tournament	NCAA Tournament	Total
1	18	(United States)	FW	Drew Hansen	12	0	0	12
2	29	(Japan)	DF	Takahiro Fujita	5	0	0	5
3	11	(Spain)	FW	Alex Partera	3	0	0	3
4	5	(France)	MF	Younes Boudinar	2	0	0	2
4	6	(United States)	MF	Joey Mueller	2	0	0	2
4	14	(Ghana)	MF	Joachim Kyei	2	0	0	2
4	19	(Spain)	FW	Izán Martínez	2	0	0	2
4	28	(Kenya)	MF	Kenn Muendo	2	0	0	2
9	17	(France)	DF	Hugo Vogel	1	0	0	1
9	20	(France)	MF	Hugo Vien	1	0	0	1
9	23	(Spain)	FW	Erik Vázquez	1	0	0	1
9	32	(Spain)	DF	Germán Moreno	1	0	0	1
Total					34	0	0	34

== Disciplinary record ==
Through November 3, 2026. Does not include two cautions issued to the UCF bench.

Rank	No.	Nat.	Po.	Name	Regular Season			Sun Belt Tournament			NCAA Tournament			Total		
Rank	No.	Nat.	Po.	Name	Yellow card	(yellow card) (yellow-red card)	Red card	Yellow card	(yellow card) (yellow-red card)	Red card	Yellow card	(yellow card) (yellow-red card)	Red card	Yellow card	(yellow card) (yellow-red card)	Red card
1	11	(Spain)	FW	Alex Partera	4	0	0	0	0	0	0	0	0	4	0	0
2	16	(Costa Rica)	DF	Timothy Arias	2	0	1	0	0	0	0	0	0	2	0	1
2	32	(Spain)	DF	Germán Moreno	2	0	1	0	0	0	0	0	0	2	0	1
4	4	(England)	DF	Jem Hewlett	3	0	0	0	0	0	0	0	0	3	0	0
5	2	(France)	DF	Leny Jérôme	2	0	0	0	0	0	0	0	0	2	0	0
5	3	(France)	DF	Gwendal Degorce	2	0	0	0	0	0	0	0	0	2	0	0
5	5	(France)	MF	Younes Boudinar	2	0	0	0	0	0	0	0	0	2	0	0
5	20	(France)	MF	Hugo Vien	2	0	0	0	0	0	0	0	0	2	0	0
9	23	(Spain)	FW	Erik Vázquez	0	0	1	0	0	0	0	0	0	0	0	1
10	8	(Norway)	MF	Petter Wingsternaes	1	0	0	0	0	0	0	0	0	1	0	0
10	13	(Canada)	GK	Matisse Hébert	1	0	0	0	0	0	0	0	0	1	0	0
10	17	(France)	DF	Hugo Vogel	1	0	0	0	0	0	0	0	0	1	0	0
10	28	(Kenya)	MF	Kenn Muendo	1	0	0	0	0	0	0	0	0	1	0	0
10	29	(Japan)	DF	Takahiro Fujita	1	0	0	0	0	0	0	0	0	1	0	0
Total					24	0	3	0	0	0	0	0	0	24	0	3

== Awards and honors ==
Recipient	Award	Date	Ref.
Takahiro Fujita	Sun Belt Preseason Defensive Player of the Year	August 12	
Matisse Hébert	Sun Belt Preseason Goalkeeper of the Year	August 12	
Takahiro Fujita	Sun Belt Defensive Player of the Week	September 1	
Takahiro Fujita	Sun Belt Offensive Player of the Week	October 6	
Drew Hansen	Sun Belt Offensive Player of the Week	October 20	
Drew Hansen	Sun Belt Offensive Player of the Week	October 27	
Drew Hansen	Sun Belt Offensive Player of the Week	November 5	
Drew Hansen	Sun Belt Player of the Year	November 6	
Drew Hansen	All-Sun Belt First Team	November 6	
Takahiro Fujita	All-Sun Belt First Team	November 6	
Gwendal Degorce	All-Sun Belt First Team	November 6	
Alex Partera	All-Sun Belt Second Team	November 6	
Younes Boudinar	All-Sun Belt Second Team	November 6	
Matisse Hébert	All-Sun Belt Second Team	November 6	

== Rankings ==
Ranking movements Legend: ██ Increase in ranking ██ Decrease in ranking — = Not ranked RV = Received votes
	Week																
Poll	Pre	1	2	3	4	5	6	7	8	9	10	11	12	13	14	15	Final
United Soccer	—	—	RV	—	RV	—	—	—	—	—	—	—		Not released			
TopDrawer Soccer	24	24	—	—	—	—	—	—	—	—	—	—	—				
College Soccer News	—	—	RV	—	—	—	—	—	—	—	—	—			Not released		
