= Sun Belt Conference Men's Soccer Coach of the Year =

Sun Belt Men's Soccer Coach of the Year
- Awarded for: the best head coach in the Sun Belt Conference
- Country: United States
- First award: 1976
- Currently held by: Dan Stratford, West Virginia

The Sun Belt Conference Men's Soccer Coach of the Year is an annual award given to the best head coach in the Sun Belt Conference during the NCAA Division I men's soccer season. The award was first given in 1976.

== Winners ==
Season	Coach	School	Reference
1976	Bob Norman	UAB	
1977	Bill Coulthard	Jacksonville	
1978	Scottie O'Neil	Georgia State	
1979	Ike Gardner	Charlotte	
1980	Dan Holcomb	South Florida	
1981	Roy Patton	South Alabama	
1982	Bob Warming	Charlotte	
1983	Bob Warming (2)	Charlotte	
1984	Mike Berticelli	Old Dominion	
1985	David Holmes	WKU	
1986	Bob Norman (2)	UAB	
1987	Roy Patton (2)	South Alabama	
1988	Bob Warming (3)	Charlotte	
1989	Mike Berticelli (2)	Old Dominion	
1990	Lincoln Phillips	VCU	
1991	Roy Patton (3)	South Alabama	
1992	Roy Patton (4)	South Alabama	
1993	Roy Patton (5)	South Alabama	
1994	Roy Patton (6)	South Alabama	
1995	Dennis Viollet	Jacksonville	
1996	Aleks Mihailovic, Randy Johnson	Jacksonville; Vanderbilt	
2014	John Scott	Hartwick	
2015	John Scott (2)	Hartwick	
2016	John Murphy	Georgia Southern	
2017	Shaun Docking	Coastal Carolina	
2018	Brett Surrency	Georgia State	
2019	Ross Duncan	UCA	
2020	Shaun Docking (2)	Coastal Carolina	
2022	Johan Cedergren	Kentucky	
2023	Scott Calabrese	UCF	
2024	Dan Stratford	West Virginia	
2025	Johan Cedergren (2)	Kentucky	
2026	Dan Stratford (2)	West Virginia	
