= VCU Rams men's soccer results by opponent =

The VCU Rams men's soccer team represents Virginia Commonwealth University in all NCAA Division I men's soccer competitions. In 1978, VCU has fielded a varsity men's soccer program. The Rams currently compete in the Colonial Athletic Association.

Below is a list of records against fellow college soccer teams the Rams have played against.

== Key ==
Legend
**Bold**	Conference team
0–0–0	Win–loss–draw
*	No games played
—	Defunct team

== Results ==
Team	1978–1989	1990–1999	2000–2009	2010–2019	Totals
Adelphi	*	1–0–0	*	*	1–0–0
Akron	*	*	*	0–1–0	0–1–0
American	2–5–0	3–6–1	3–1–1	*	8–12–2
Bradley	*	0–0–1	*	*	0–0–1
Clemson			1–0–0	*	1–0–0
Coastal Carolina	*	*	*	1–1–0	1–1–0
**Delaware**				1–1–0	1–1–0
**Drexel**				1–1–0	1–1–0
**George Mason**				2–0–0	2–0–0
Indiana	*	*	0–1–0	*	0–1–0
Howard	*	*	*	1–0–0	1–0–0
**Hofstra**	*	*	*	2–1–0	2–1–0
**James Madison**				2–0–0	2–0–0
Longwood				0–0–1	0–0–1
Navy	*	0–1–1	*	1–0–0	1–1–1
North Carolina	*	*	2–4–1	0–1–0	2–5–1
**Old Dominion**				0–1–1	0–1–1
Penn State	*	0–2–1	*	*	0–2–1
Radford	1–1–1	5–1–0	1–0–0	*	7–2–1
Richmond				2–0–0	2–0–0
**Towson**				2–0–0	2–0–0
UC Santa Barbara	*	*	0–1–0	*	0–1–0
Virginia	0–5–1	0–6–0	3–3–1	0–1–0	3–15–1
Virginia Tech	5–6–1	4–2–0	2–0–0	0–0–0	11–8–1
Wake Forest			1–0–0	*	1–0–0
Wofford				0–0–1	0–0–1
West Virginia			1–0–0	*	1–0–0
**William & Mary**	0–3–0	3–3–1	6–10–1	0–2–0	9–18–2
