= Stone Stadium =

Stone Stadium may refer to:

- Eugene E. Stone III Stadium (Columbia, South Carolina), the soccer stadium for the University of South Carolina Gamecocks
- Eugene E. Stone III Stadium (Greenville, South Carolina), the soccer stadium for the Furman University Paladins
