= SEC Derby =

College soccer rivalry in the U.S.

- Kentucky Wildcats South Carolina Gamecocks
- Sport: College soccer
- First meeting: November 9, 1991; South Carolina 6–0 Kentucky
- Latest meeting: October 19, 2025; Kentucky 2-1 South Carolina
- Next meeting: 2026 @ South Carolina

Statistics
- Total meetings: 26
- All-time series: Kentucky, 14–10–2
- Largest victory: South Carolina 6–0 Kentucky (1991)
- Longest win streak: 4, Kentucky (2017–2020)
- Longest unbeaten streak: 7, Kentucky (2017–2022)
- Current win streak: 3, Kentucky (2024-)
- Current unbeaten streak: 3, Kentucky (2024-)

The SEC Derby is the set of matches between the University of Kentucky Wildcats and University of South Carolina Gamecocks men's soccer teams. A conference matchup since 2005, since the 2022 season, it has been a conference matchup in the Sun Belt Conference. Both programs had been single-sport members of Conference USA (CUSA) (Note: Before 2024, that conference used "C-USA" as its official abbreviation.) from 2005 through the 2021 season. Both teams are the only colleges in the Southeastern Conference (SEC) which sponsor men's soccer, which the conference does not sponsor as an indirect consequence of Title IX restrictions. South Carolina had started its program in 1978 while an independent, and UK started its program in 1991. From 1991 to 2004, UK had been a Mid-American Conference member for men's soccer only. Despite having joined the Metro Conference in 1983, South Carolina continued to play men's soccer as an independent, not joining for that sport until 1993, two years after the rest of its athletic program had joined the SEC. The Gamecocks also played in the Metro in that league's final men's soccer season of 1994. The following year, CUSA was created with the merger of the Metro with the Great Midwest Conference, a league that had been formed in 1991 by a group of schools that included three charter Metro members. South Carolina was not invited to remain as a men's soccer member after the merger.

The matches between the two teams have also been nicknamed The Southeastern Conference Men's Soccer Championship.

Prior to the establishment of the formal derby in 2005, Kentucky had a rivalry with Vanderbilt, when the Vanderbilt Commodores men's soccer program was active. When the UK–Vanderbilt rivalry was first played in 1991, Vanderbilt was a men's soccer independent, later becoming a single-sport member of the Sun Belt Conference for the 1995 and 1996 seasons and the Missouri Valley Conference from 1997 until the school dropped men's soccer after the 2005 season. The last UK–Vanderbilt match was played in 2000. South Carolina did not regularly schedule Vanderbilt at the time, as they had primarily been independent (except for the final two years of the Metro's existence); in 2005, South Carolina's return to the reunified CUSA led to UK joining that league.

Both Carolina and UK won two CUSA tournament titles before moving to the Sun Belt Conference.

== Results ==
=== Kentucky vs. South Carolina ===
Kentucky victories	South Carolina victories

No.	Date	Location	Winner	Score
1	November 9, 1991	Columbia, SC	South Carolina	6–0
2	October 11, 1992	Lexington, KY	South Carolina	2–0
3	October 14, 2005	Columbia, SC	South Carolina	2–0
4	November 9, 2005	Dallas, TX†¶	South Carolina	1–0
5	October 1, 2006	Lexington, KY	Kentucky	1–0
6	October 9, 2007	Columbia, SC	South Carolina	2–1
7	October 12, 2008	Lexington, KY	Kentucky	2–0
8	October 17, 2009	Columbia, SC	South Carolina	1–0
9	November 7, 2010	Lexington, KY	Kentucky	2–1
10	November 4, 2011	Columbia, SC	Tie	2–2
11	November 4, 2012	Lexington, KY	South Carolina	1–0
12	October 25, 2014	Columbia, SC	Kentucky	4–3
13	November 12, 2014	Norfolk, VA†	South Carolina	2–1
14	October 18, 2015	Lexington, KY	Kentucky	1–0

No.	Date	Location	Winner	Score
15	November 4, 2016	Columbia, SC	South Carolina	2–1
16	October 8, 2017	Lexington, KY	Kentucky	1–0
17	September 29, 2018	Columbia, SC	Kentucky	2–1
18	October 27, 2019	Lexington, KY	Kentucky	4–0
19	April 17, 2021	Columbia, SC	Kentucky	2–1
20	October 23, 2021	Lexington, KY	Tie	0–0
21	November 1, 2022	Columbia, SC	Kentucky	3–0
22	November 6, 2022	Lexington, KY†	Kentucky	2–1
23	September 15, 2023	Lexington, KY	South Carolina	1–0
24	October 4, 2024	Columbia, SC	Kentucky	2–0
25	November 10, 2024	Morgantown, WV†	Kentucky	1–0
26	October 19, 2025	Lexington, KY	Kentucky	2–1
Series: Kentucky leads 14–10–2

† = Conference Tournament game (C-USA 2005 and 2014: Sun Belt 2022)
↑ = NCAA Tournament game†
¶ = 0–0 game in knockout tournament decided on penalties. The official score is Kentucky 0 (0), South Carolina 0 (3).

=== Kentucky vs. Vanderbilt ===
Kentucky victories	Vanderbilt victories

No.	Date	Location	Winner	Score
1	October 18, 1991	Nashville, TN	Kentucky	4–1
2	November 1, 1992	Lexington, KY	Kentucky	3–2
3	November 5, 1993	Nashville, TN	Vanderbilt	6–2
4	November 6, 1994	Lexington, KY	Vanderbilt	3–0
5	October 29, 1995	Nashville, TN	Vanderbilt	1–0
6	November 3, 1996	Lexington, KY	Vanderbilt	3–1

No.	Date	Location	Winner	Score
7	October 29, 1997	Nashville, TN	Vanderbilt	3–1
8	September 27, 1998	Lexington, KY	Kentucky	4–1
9	October 10, 1999	Nashville, TN	Kentucky	3–1
10	September 8, 2000	Lexington, KY	Vanderbilt	1–0
Series: Vanderbilt leads 6–4

=== South Carolina vs. Vanderbilt ===
South Carolina victories	Vanderbilt victories

No.	Date	Location	Winner	Score
1	November 8, 1992	Columbia, SC	South Carolina	3–1
2	October 10, 1993	Nashville, TN	South Carolina	2–1
Series: South Carolina leads 2–0

== List of champions ==
Year	Champion	Score	Runner-up	Site	Ref.
1991	South Carolina	6–0	Kentucky	Stone Stadium • Columbia, SC	
1992	South Carolina (2)	2–0	Kentucky	Bell Soccer Complex • Lexington, KY	
1993	Vanderbilt	6–2	Kentucky	VU Soccer Complex • Nashville, TN	
1994	Vanderbilt (2)	3–0	Kentucky	Bell Soccer Complex • Lexington, KY	
1995	Vanderbilt (3)	3–0	Kentucky	VU Soccer Complex • Nashville, TN	
1996	Vanderbilt (4)	3–1	Kentucky	Bell Soccer Complex • Lexington, KY	
1997	Vanderbilt (5)	3–1	Kentucky	VU Soccer Complex • Nashville, TN	
1998	Kentucky	4–1	Vanderbilt	Bell Soccer Complex • Lexington, KY	
1999	Kentucky (2)	3–1	Vanderbilt	VU Soccer Complex • Nashville, TN	
2000	Vanderbilt (6)	1–0	Kentucky	Bell Soccer Complex • Lexington, KY	
No matches from 2001–2004
2005	South Carolina (3)	2–0	Kentucky	Stone Stadium • Columbia, SC	
2006	Kentucky (3)	1–0	South Carolina	Bell Soccer Complex • Lexington, KY	
2007	South Carolina (4)	2–1	Kentucky	Stone Stadium • Columbia, SC	
2008	Kentucky (4)	2–0	South Carolina	Bell Soccer Complex • Lexington, KY	
2009	South Carolina (5)	1–0	Kentucky	Stone Stadium • Columbia, SC	
2010	Kentucky (5)	2–1	South Carolina	Bell Soccer Complex • Lexington, KY	
2011	Kentucky (6)	2–2	South Carolina	Stone Stadium • Columbia, SC	
2012	South Carolina (6)	1–0	Kentucky	Bell Soccer Complex • Lexington, KY	
2014	Kentucky (7)	4–3	South Carolina	Stone Stadium • Columbia, SC	
2015	Kentucky (8)	1–0	South Carolina	Bell Soccer Complex • Lexington, KY	
2016	South Carolina (7)	2–1	Kentucky	Stone Stadium • Columbia, SC	
2017	Kentucky (9)	1–0	South Carolina	Bell Soccer Complex • Lexington, KY	
2018	Kentucky (10)	2–1	South Carolina	Stone Stadium • Columbia, SC	
2019	Kentucky (11)	4–0	South Carolina	Bell Soccer Complex • Lexington, KY	
2020	Kentucky (12)	2–1	South Carolina	Stone Stadium • Columbia, SC	
2021	Kentucky (13)	0–0	South Carolina	Bell Soccer Complex • Lexington, KY	
2022	Kentucky (14)	3–0	South Carolina	Stone Stadium • Columbia, SC	
2023	South Carolina (8)	1–0	Kentucky	Bell Soccer Complex • Lexington, KY	
2024	Kentucky (15)	2–0	South Carolina	Stone Stadium • Columbia, SC	
2025	Kentucky (16)	2–1	South Carolina	Bell Soccer Complex • Lexington, KY	

== Championships by school ==
School	Championships	Years
Kentucky	16	1998, 1999, 2006, 2008, 2010, 2011, 2014, 2015, 2017, 2018, 2019, 2020, 2021, 2022, 2024, 2025
South Carolina	10	1991, 1992, 2005, 2007, 2009, 2011, 2012, 2016, 2021, 2023
Vanderbilt^{†}	6	1993, 1994, 1995, 1996, 1997, 2000

^{†} on hiatus
