= Adam Perron =

American soccer coach

Current position
- Title: Head Coach
- Team: Coastal Carolina Chanticleers
- Conference: Sun Belt Conference
- Record: 6-6-4

Biographical details
- Education: Colby–Sawyer College

Playing career
- 2002–2005: Colby–Sawyer College
- 2006–2009: Western Mass Pioneers
- 2007–2009: Massachusetts Twisters
- 2013–2014: GPS Portland Phoenix
- Position: Goalkeeper

Coaching career (HC unless noted)
- –2015: SNHU Penmen (goalkeepers)
- 2016: Ohio State Buckeyes (goalkeepers)
- 2018–2019: James Madison Dukes (assistant)
- 2020–2025: Virginia Cavaliers (assistant)
- 2026–present: Coastal Carolina Chanticleers

Head coaching record
- Overall: 6-6-4

Adam Perron is an American-born American college soccer coach. He currently coaches the Coastal Carolina Chanticleers.

== Coaching career ==
Adam Perron was named the Coastal Carolina University head men's soccer coach in November 2025, becoming the fifth head coach in the program's history.

== Head coaching record ==
Record table
Season	Team	Overall	Conference	Standing	Postseason
Coastal Carolina Chanticleers (Sun Belt Conference) (2026–present)
2026	Coastal Carolina	7-6-4	4-3-2		
Coastal Carolina:		7-6-4	4-3-2		
Total:		7-6-4			
National champion Postseason invitational champion Conference regular season champion Conference regular season and conference tournament champion Division regular season champion Division regular season and conference tournament champion Conference tournament champion
