= Dan Stratford =

English footballer (born 1985)

Personal information
- Full name: Daniel James Stratford
- Date of birth: 29 May 1985 (age 41)
- Place of birth: London, England
- Positions: Midfielder; right back

Team information
- Current team: West Virginia Mountaineers (head coach)

Youth career
- 2001–2003: Fulham

College career
Years	Team	Apps	(Gls)
2004–2007	West Virginia Mountaineers		

Senior career*
Years	Team	Apps	(Gls)
2007	Cape Cod Crusaders	16	(4)
2008	D.C. United	5	(0)
2009–2010	Inverness Caledonian Thistle	14	(1)
2010–2011	Hereford United	7	(0)
Total		42	(5)

Managerial career
- 2011–2013: West Virginia Mountaineers (assistant)
- 2013–2016: Charleston Golden Eagles (assistant)
- 2017–2019: Charleston Golden Eagles
- 2020–: West Virginia Mountaineers
- * Club domestic league appearances and goals as of 03:49, 5 February 2017 (UTC)

Daniel James Stratford (born 29 May 1985) is an English former professional footballer who played as a midfielder or right back. He is currently the head coach of the West Virginia Mountaineers men's soccer team, his alma mater.

During his playing career, he appeared professionally for D.C. United in Major League Soccer, Scottish club Inverness Caledonian Thistle, and English club Hereford United. As a coach, he led the University of Charleston Charleston Golden Eagles to NCAA Division II Men's Soccer Championships in 2017 and 2019.

== Early life and education ==
Born in London, Stratford attended Wilson's School until 2003. He began his football career in the youth academy at Fulham, progressing to their reserve team.

== College career ==
Stratford played college soccer for the West Virginia Mountaineers from 2004 to 2007. He finished as the program's all-time leader in assists (27) and matches played (85). While in college, he also played for the Cape Cod Crusaders in the USL Premier Development League.

== Professional career ==
Stratford was selected by D.C. United with the 24th overall pick in the 2008 MLS Supplemental Draft on 24 January 2008. He made his debut as a substitute against the Kansas City Wizards on 29 March 2008 and earned his first start on 26 April 2008 in a 4–1 win over Real Salt Lake.

He was waived by D.C. United on 15 August 2008. After a successful trial, he joined Scottish club Inverness Caledonian Thistle on 23 July 2009, but was released on 6 May 2010.

Stratford then signed a one-year deal with Hereford United on 16 July 2010 following another trial. Limited first-team opportunities led to his departure at the end of the 2010–11 season.

== Coaching career ==
Stratford began coaching as an assistant with the West Virginia Mountaineers from 2011 to 2013. He then served as an assistant with the Charleston Golden Eagles from 2013 to 2016 before being promoted to head coach in January 2017.

Under his leadership, Charleston won the NCAA Division II Men's Soccer Championship in 2017 and 2019.

In January 2020, Stratford returned to West Virginia University as head coach of the Mountaineers men's soccer team.
