= Johan Cedergren =

Swedish soccer coach

Current position
- Title: Head Coach
- Team: Kentucky Wildcats
- Conference: Sun Belt

Biographical details
- Born: Sölvesborg, Sweden
- Education: University of Cincinnati

Coaching career (HC unless noted)
- 2005–2010: Dartmouth (assistant)
- 2011–present: Kentucky

Head coaching record
- Overall: 147-70-48

Accomplishments and honors

Championships
- Regular Season CUSA: 2015, 2018; Regular Season Sun Belt: 2022, 2025; CUSA Tournament: 2018, 2021; Sun Belt Tournament: 2022

Awards
- Sun Belt Coach of the Year 2022, 2025

Johan Cedergren is a Swedish-born American college soccer coach. He currently coaches the University of Kentucky Wildcats. He is going on his 14th season as the head coach of Kentucky.

== Head coaching record ==
Record table
Season	Team	Overall	Conference	Standing	Postseason
Kentucky (Conference USA) (2012–2021)
2012	Kentucky	10-9-2	4-3-1		NCAA 1st
2013	Kentucky	7-10-3	3-4-2		
2014	Kentucky	11-6-4	6-1-2		NCAA
2015	Kentucky	12-5-2	7-0-1		NCAA
2016	Kentucky	11-5-3	5-3-0		NCAA
2017	Kentucky	8-6-4	4-2-2		
2018	Kentucky	19-2-1	12-1-0		NCAA
2019	Kentucky	13-5-8	4-2-1		NCAA 2nd Round
2020	Kentucky	12-5-2	3-3-1		NCAA
2021	Kentucky	15-2-4	3-1-4		NCAA
Conference USA:		118-55-33	59-23-20		
Kentucky (Sun Belt Conference) (2022–present)
2022	Kentucky	15-1-5	5-0-3		NCAA
2023	Kentucky	8-8-4	3-3-3		NCAA
2024	Kentucky	6-6-6	5-3-3	4th	
Sun Belt:		29-15-15	13-6-9		
Total:		147-70-48 (.645)			
National champion Postseason invitational champion Conference regular season champion Conference regular season and conference tournament champion Division regular season champion Division regular season and conference tournament champion Conference tournament champion
