= CCU Soccer Complex =

Soccer stadium in Conway, South Carolina, US

- Interactive map of CCU Soccer Complex
- Address: Conway, SC; United States
- Coordinates: 33°47′57″N 78°59′47″W
- Owner: Coastal Carolina University
- Operator: C. Carolina Univ. Athletics
- Type: Soccer-specific stadium
- Record attendance: 1,577

Construction
- Groundbreaking: 2023
- Opened: August 2024; 2 years ago
- Cost: $5 million
- Architect: The Boudreaux Group
- General contractors: FBI Construction, Inc.

Tenants
- Coastal Carolina Chanticleers (NCAA) teams: men's and women's soccer (2024-present)

Website
- goccusports.com/soccer-stadium

The CCU Soccer Complex is a collegiate soccer stadium that was opened in Fall of 2024 at Coastal Carolina University. It replaced the old stadium Coastal Carolina University Soccer Field, when it was torn down in order to reroute University Boulvard along with the construction of the Indoor Practice Facility.

It serves at home venue to the men's and women's soccer teams of the University. The total cost of the stadium was $5 million, and included press boxes and scoreboard. A second phase will include game-day locker rooms, restrooms and concessions, and it is expected to be finished in 2025. The venue was built with $3,5 million from the CCU Student Housing Foundation and the rest was donated by former CCU American football coach and CEO of TD Ameritrade Joe Moglia. The University did not disclose the amount gifted by Moglia.

I want to be able to keep that number confidential. Most of the things I’ve given over the span of my lifetime frankly have been anonymous or confidential. For this one it was special enough for the university that they felt it really warranted announcing.

— Joe Moglia about his donation to CCU

The first game at the stadium was a women's soccer contest between Coastal and Richmond. That game ended in a 1–1 draw, with Coastal's Olivia Goretski scoring the first goal in the stadium's history.
