= Georgia State Panthers men's soccer =

Collegiate men's soccer team

Georgia State Panthers
- Founded: 1967
- University: Georgia State University
- Head coach: Brett Surrency (17th season)
- Conference: Sun Belt; Division I Division
- Location: Atlanta, Georgia, US
- Stadium: GSU Soccer Complex (capacity: 2,000)
- Nickname: Panthers
- Colors: Blue and white
| Home | Away |

NCAA tournament Round of 32
- 2021

NCAA tournament appearances
- 1997, 2000, 2011, 2018, 2021

Conference tournament championships
- 1983, 1986, 1987, 1997, 2000, 2018

Conference regular season championships
- 2018

The Georgia State Panthers men's soccer team represents Georgia State University (GSU) in all NCAA Division I men's college soccer competitions. As of the 2022 season, the Panthers play in their full-time home of the Sun Belt Conference (SBC), which reinstated the sport after a one-season hiatus. During the SBC's men's soccer hiatus, GSU had been a single-sport member of the Mid-American Conference. However, following a major conference realignment in 2021 and 2022 brought several new men's soccer schools to the SBC, that league announced it would reinstate men's soccer no later than 2023, eventually moving that date forward to 2022.

== Coaching staff ==
As of May 27, 2021. Number of seasons includes the upcoming fall 2021 season.

| Name | Position coached | Consecutive season at Georgia State in current position |
|---|---|---|
| Brett Surrency | Head coach | 12th |
| Ricky Davey | Assistant coach | 3rd |
| Daniel Mohsen | Assistant coach | 5th |
| Bree Hicken | Academic Advisor | 3rd |
| Layne Jackson | Athletic Trainer | 4th |

== Championships ==
=== Conference regular season championships ===
| Year | Coach | Overall Record | Conference Record |
|---|---|---|---|
| 2018 | Brett Surrency | 11–6–3 | 2–0–2 |
| Conference regular season championships | | | 1 |

=== Conference tournament championships ===
| Year | Coach | Opponent | Score | Site | Overall Record | Conf. Record |
|---|---|---|---|---|---|---|
| 1983 | Scottie O'Neill | Houston Baptist | 1–0 | Houston, TX | 16–6–0 | |
| 1986 | Scottie O'Neill | Georgia Southern | 4–0 | Abilene, TX | 13–6–2 | |
| 1987 | Hugh Beasley | Centenary (LA) | 2–0 | Atlanta, GA | 11–6–2 | |
| 1997 | Brett Teach | Florida Atlantic | 2–0 | Boca Raton, FL | 9–11–1 | 4–3–1 |
| 2000 | Kerem Daser | Mercer | 1–0 | Buies Creek, NC | 12–9–0 | 4–2–0 |
| 2018 | Brett Surrency | Georgia Southern | 4–2 | Statesboro, GA | 11–6–3 | 2–0–2 |
| Conference tournament championships | | | | | | 6 |

== Rivalries ==
Georgia State's main rival is Georgia Southern. The multi-sports rivalry is known as "Modern Day Hate". State and Southern remain conference rivals in men's soccer, as Southern moved that sport to the MAC along with State before the SBC reinstated men's soccer in 2022.

=== Record against Sun Belt opponents ===
| Opponent | Series record |
|---|---|
| Coastal Carolina | 6–11–2 |
| Georgia Southern | 31–11–6 |
| James Madison | 2–6–0 |
| Kentucky | 0–1–0 |
| Marshall | 0-1-2 |
| Old Dominion | 1–9–0 |
| South Carolina | 2–11–0 |
| West Virginia | 1–2–0 |

== Coaching records ==
| Coach | Years | Overall | | Conference | | Note |
| Coach | Years | Record | Pct. | Record | Pct. | Note |
|---|---|---|---|---|---|---|
| Costas Alexandrides | 1967–68 | 13–5–1 | .711 | | | |
| Stoney Burgess | 1969–75 | 68–38–3 | .638 | | | |
| Scottie O'Neill | 1976–86 | 143–57–4 | .711 | | | 2 TAAC Championships (1983, 1986) |
| Hugh Beasley | 1987–93 | 50–72–15 | .420 | | | 1 TAAC Championship (1987) |
| Brett Teach | 1994–99 | 43–66–3 | .397 | | | 1 TAAC Championship (1997), first NCAA appearance |
| Kerem Daser | 2000–09 | 67–100–10 | .407 | | | 1 Atlantic Sun Championship (2000) |
| Brett Surrency | 2010– | 89–75–12 | .540 | | | 1 Sun Belt Championship (2018) |
| Total | | 417–413–38 | .532 | | | |

== Postseason ==
=== NCAA tournament results ===
Georgia State has appeared in five NCAA Tournaments. Their combined record is 1–4–1.

| Year | Round | Opponent | Result |
|---|---|---|---|
| 1997 | Play-in round | Howard | L 0–2 |
| 2000 | Play-in round | Rhode Island | L 3–4 ^{OT} |
| 2011 | First round | Duke | L 0–1 |
| 2018 | First round | Charlotte | T 2–2 (L 3–4 p) |
| 2021 | First round Second round | Charlotte; Georgetown | W 1–0; L 0–2 |

== Stadiums ==
The Panthers play most of their games at the 1,500-capacity GSU Soccer Stadium. However, they have played some matches at the nearby Center Parc Stadium, normally home to GSU football, in Atlanta.

== See also ==
- Georgia State Panthers women's soccer
