= Wendell & Vickie Bell Soccer Complex =

Soccer stadium at the University of Kentucky

- The Bell
- Interactive map of Wendell & Vickie Bell; Soccer Complex
- Address: 556 Wildcat Ct. Lexington, KY; United States
- Coordinates: 38.01763°N 84.50083°W
- Owner: University of Kentucky
- Operator: Univ. of Kentucky Athletics
- Capacity: 3,368
- Type: Soccer-specific stadium
- Screen: yes

Construction
- Opened: 2014; 12 years ago
- Renovated: 2011
- Cost: US$7.7 million
- Architects: Luckett & Farley

Tenants
- Kentucky Wildcats (NCAA) teams: men's and women's soccer

Website
- ukathletics.com/soccer-complex

The Wendell & Vickie Bell Soccer Complex, colloquially known as "The Bell" is a soccer-specific stadium at the University of Kentucky, in Lexington, Kentucky in the United States. It is the home of the university's men's and women's college soccer teams.

As of Fall 2021, admission to the men's and women's regular season soccer matches are free. Post season match tickets are not free, and much be purchased through a third-party vendor. There is an extensive list of prohibited items at the Wendell and Vickie Bell Soccer complex. Included in that list backpacks, firearms, alcohol, ice chests, non-service animals, and chairs or tents. Along with prohibited objects at the complex, there are prohibited behaviors such as smoking or throwing projectiles onto the field.

== Architecture and design ==
The University of Kentucky worked closely with the architectural firm Luckett & Farley to design and complete the stadium. The Bell opened in the spring of 2014, and has a spectator capacity of 3,368.The construction of the facility cost the University of Kentucky $7.7 million. The stadium has approximately 2,500 square-feet of press box and suit space, 13,000 square-feet of support space that includes: locker rooms, showers, student-athlete lounges, training facilities, physician's room, and other offices and storage. The soccer complex is connected to the softball stadium and shares concessions, bathrooms, and a ticket booth. In 2021, $600,000 worth of additions were added. These additions included a new turf playing field, a video tower and a new video board.

== Wendell and Vickie Bell ==
Wendell Bell, a University of Kentucky Alumni, studied computer science at the university and currently is the executive chairman of Enerfab, a construction company based in Cincinnati, Ohio. Vickie Bell went to Northern Kentucky University and was a schoolteacher before she retired. She also serves as a community advisory member on the athletics committee of the UK board of trustees. Wendell and Vickie heavily endorse the university's service learning trips for student-athletes, and Vickie has accompanied the students on the trip to Ethiopia three times.

She served as the UK contingent. On top of all of this, The Bells are longtime University of Kentucky fans. Their support of the athletics programs dates back to 1997, when Orlando Smith was hired as the men's basketball coach at the university. The couples relationships with the athletics program was later strengthen when Mitch Barhhart was hired as the UK athletics director in 2002. Ever since, The Bells have been constant fixtures in the stands for the UK basketball and football teams, but the pair has a special affinity for traditional, non revenue-generating sports, such as volleyball, rifle, women's basketball, and women's soccer. Not only do they go to all the home games, the couple follows the teams on the road too.

=== Naming ===
Overall, the couple has donated more than $9 million to UK athletics, and specifically $5 million to the construction of the soccer complex. With their monetary donations and constant support of UK athletics, the university decided that the Bells' case exceeded the "extraordinary circumstances" clause for naming buildings. This ruling by the board of trustees allowed the complex to be named after the couple.
