= Eugene E. Stone III Stadium (Columbia, South Carolina) =

Soccer stadium for the University of South Carolina Gamecocks

Stone Stadium
- "The Graveyard"
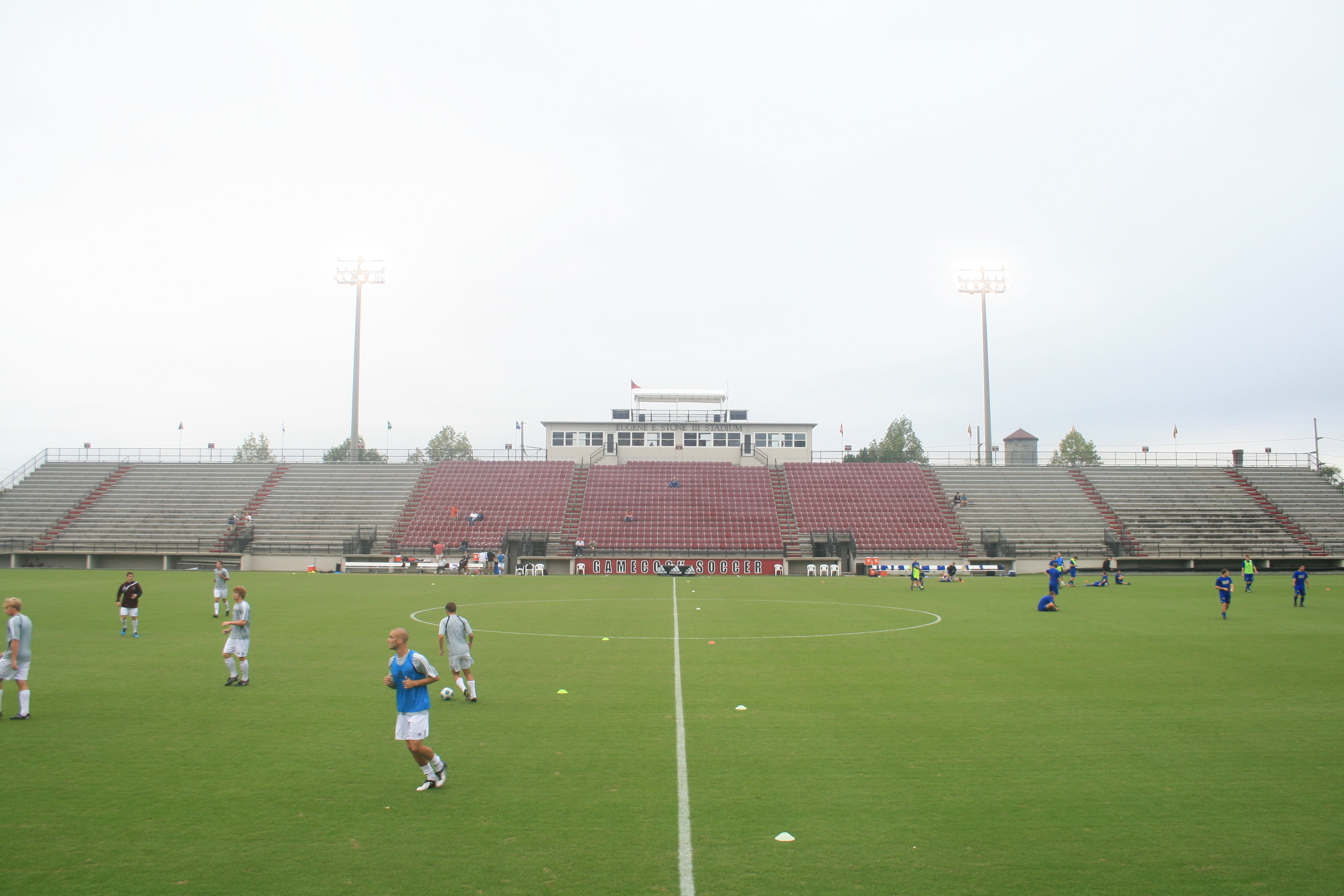
- View of the stadium during a game in 2009
- Interactive map of Stone Stadium
- Address: Columbia, South Carolina; United States
- Coordinates: 33.9877°N 81.0250°W
- Owner: University of South Carolina
- Operator: USC Athletics
- Capacity: 5,000
- Type: Soccer-specific stadium
- Surface: Grass

Construction
- Groundbreaking: 1981
- Opened: 1981; 45 years ago

Tenants
- South Carolina Gamecocks (NCAA) teams: men's soccer (1996–present); Professional teams: Columbia Heat (PDL) (1996); Palmetto FC Bantams (2012–present)

Website
- gamecocksonline.com/stone-stadium

Eugene E. Stone III Stadium is a soccer-specific stadium located in Columbia, South Carolina on the campus of the University of South Carolina. The 5,000-seat venue is home to the USC Gamecocks soccer teams since 1981, when the Gamecocks started the men's program in 1978.

The current grandstand was built in 1996 thanks to a $1 million grant from Eugene E. Stone III, a Carolina graduate.

The nickname "the Graveyard" comes from the stadium's proximity to the House of Peace cemetery.

The women's team plays in the Southeastern Conference, while the men's team moves from Conference USA to the Sun Belt Conference effective with the 2022 season. Men's soccer is not sanctioned by the SEC; Carolina and the other SEC men's soccer school, Kentucky, played in C-USA from 2005 through 2021, and moved together to the Sun Belt in 2022.

During the 2025 FIFA Club World Cup, Brazilian club Fluminense FC used Stone Stadium as its training facility.

The attendance records are 7,671 (men) and 7,004 (women), both set in 2026 in the Palmetto Derby.
