= Kentucky Wildcats men's soccer =

American college soccer team

- 2026 Kentucky Wildcats men's soccer team
- Founded: 1991; 35 years ago
- University: University of Kentucky
- Athletic director: J Batt
- Head coach: Johan Cedergren (15th season)
- Conference: Sun Belt
- Location: Lexington, Kentucky, US
- Stadium: Wendell & Vickie Bell Soccer Complex (capacity: 3,368)
- Nickname: Wildcats
- Colors: Blue and white
Home	Away

NCAA tournament Quarterfinals
- 2018

NCAA tournament Round of 16
- 2000, 2018, 2020, 2022

NCAA tournament appearances
- 1999, 2000, 2001, 2003, 2012, 2014, 2015, 2016, 2018, 2019, 2020, 2021, 2022, 2023, 2025

Conference tournament championships
- MAC: 1999, 2000, 2001; C-USA: 2018, 2021; SBC: 2022

Conference regular season championships
- MAC: 2000, 2001, 2003, 2004; C-USA: 2015, 2018; SBC: 2022

The Kentucky Wildcats men's soccer team is an intercollegiate varsity sports team of the University of Kentucky (UK).

Since the Southeastern Conference (SEC) does not sponsor men's soccer (minimum four schools needed to sponsor a sport, only two offer it), the team has been associate members of other conferences. From 1995 to 2004, it was a member of the Mid-American Conference. In 2005, UK moved men's soccer to Conference USA, creating a football derby with fellow SEC member South Carolina, which had rejoined the reunified conference that season. Both UK and South Carolina remained in C-USA men's soccer through the 2021 season, after which both programs left for the newly reinstated men's soccer league of the Sun Belt Conference.

In 2018, Kentucky went 17–1–1 with wins against #6 Louisville and #2 Indiana, both by a score of 3–0 at home. They finished 7–1 overall in conference play with their only lose coming on the road at FIU 2–3. The Wildcats won the C-USA Regular Season and Tournament Titles. They were the #3 overall seed in the NCAA Tournament, their highest until 2022.

In 2022, Kentucky finished the regular season at 14–0–5 with wins against #10 Louisville and #21 Lipscomb at home, both by scores of 3–2. They also tied against #20 Tulsa in Tulsa 1–1 and #7 Marshall in Lexington 1–1. All four of these games took place in a two-week span from September 6 to September 20. They finished 5–0–3 and Sun Belt Regular Season and Tournament Champions. They were awarded the #1 overall seed in the NCAA Tournament, the first time in school history.

Kentucky features three different annual derbies, in-state, in-conference, and a four-way oprhan team derby.

- Governor's Cup: Against in-state rival Louisville, the traditional all-sports rivalry between Louisville (ACC) and Kentucky (SBC).
- Big 12/SEC Challenge: A four-way Sun Belt Conference rivalry among the four associate members whose conferences do not sponsor the sport. West Virginia and Central Florida, members of the Big 12 Conference in other sports, form the "Big 12" half of the four-way derby.
  - SEC Derby: The Southeastern Conference side of the four-way derby, Kentucky's game against South Carolina, while neither are regarded as major SEC rivals in other sports, the two schools are the only SEC members that sponsor varsity men's soccer teams, which forms a conference derby. UK left the Mid-American Conference after the 2004 season when South Carolina rejoined the reunified Conference USA, in which it had last been a member in 1994 (when it was the Metro). The two schools moved men's soccer together to the Sun Belt Conference for 2022. The derby has often been called the Southeastern Conference Championship Game.

== Notable former players ==
- (Indonesia) Cyrus Margono
- (Finland) Ilkka Jäntti
- (United States) Andy Gruenebaum
- (Canada) Riley O'Neill
- (Canada) Michael D'Agostino
- (United States) Barry Rice
- (Hong Kong) Leon Jones
- (England) Jason Griffiths
- (Canada) Callum Irving
- (Lesotho) Napo Matsoso
- (United States) JJ Williams
- (United States) (Zambia) Aimé Mabika
- (United States) Brett Smith
- (United States) Jansen Wilson

== Honours ==
- Mid-American Conference tournament
  - Winners (3): 1999, 2000, 2001
  - Runners-up (1): 1996
