= Dick Dlesk Soccer Stadium =

Soccer stadium in Morgantown, West Virginia

Coordinates: 39°39′06″N 79°59′03″W

Dlesk Stadium

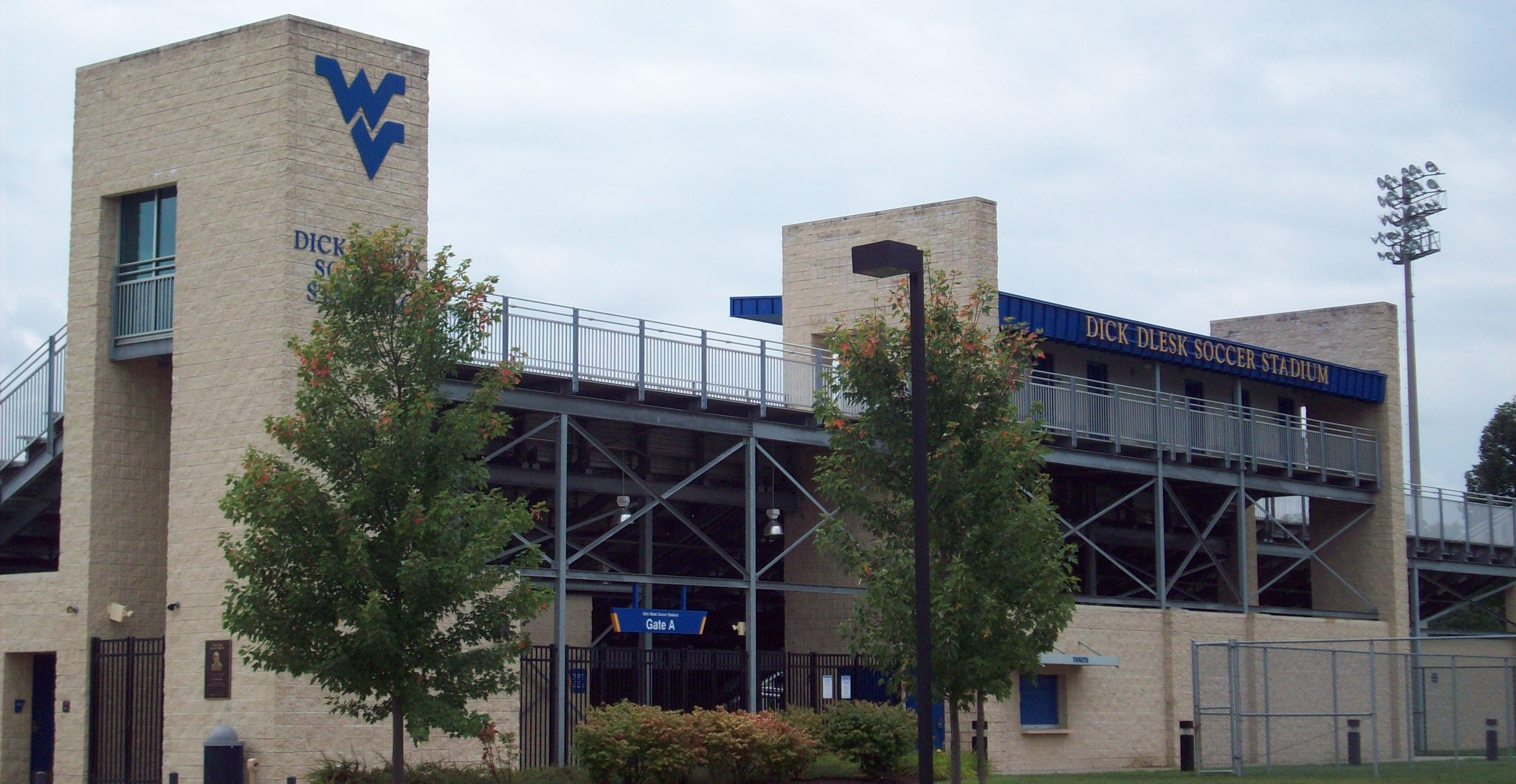
- Exterior view of the stadium in 2010
- Interactive map of Dlesk Stadium
- Full name: Dick Dlesk Soccer Stadium
- Former names: Mountaineer Soccer Complex
- Address: Monongahela Boulevard; Morgantown, WV; United States
- Owner: West Virginia University
- Operator: West Virginia Univ. Athletics
- Capacity: 1,650
- Record attendance: 3,162 vs Marshall (Nov 17, 2024)

Construction
- Built: 2003–2004
- Opened: August 2004; 22 years ago

Tenants
- West Virginia Mountaineers (NCAA) teams: men's and women's soccer

Website
- wvusports.com/dick-dlesk-soccer-stadium

Dick Dlesk Soccer Stadium is a 1,650-capacity soccer specific stadium located in Morgantown, West Virginia where it serves as the home field for the West Virginia Mountaineers men's and women's soccer teams.

Originally called the "Mountaineer Soccer Complex", the stadium was completed in August 2004 and is named in honor of University benefactor Dick Dlesk.

== Top attended games ==
As of 22 Aug 2025

=== Men's ===
| # | Att. | Opponent | Date | Score |
|---|---|---|---|---|
| 1 | 3,162 | #8 Marshall | 17 Nov 2024 | 0–0 |
| 2 | 3,147 | #1 Marshall | 18 Oct 2023 | 5–2 |
| 3 | 3,137 | #20 Louisville | 19 Nov 2023 | 1–0 |
| 4 | 3,109 | #25 Loyola Marymount | 2 Dec 2023 | 3–1 |
| 5 | 2,968 | Kentucky | 27 Sep 2024 | 0–0 |

=== Women's ===
| # | Att. | Opponent | Date | Score |
|---|---|---|---|---|
| 1 | 3,000 | #8 USC | 30 Nov 2007 | 0–1 |
| 2 | 2,471 | Ohio State | 18 Nov 2016 | 1–0 (a.e.t.) |
| 3 | 2,421 | #10 Virginia | 24 Aug 2017 | 1–2 (a.e.t.) |
| 4 | 2,081 | #13 Texas | 7 Oct 2018 | 2–1 |
| 5 | 2,068 | Texas Tech | 14 Oct 2016 | 1–0 |
