= West Virginia Mountaineers men's soccer =

American college soccer team

- Founded: 1961; 65 years ago
- University: West Virginia University
- Head coach: Dan Stratford (7th season)
- Conference: Sun Belt
- Location: Morgantown, West Virginia, US
- Stadium: Dick Dlesk Soccer Stadium (capacity: 1,600)
- Nickname: Mountaineers
- Colors: Gold and blue
Home	Away

NCAA tournament College Cup
- 2023

NCAA tournament Quarterfinals
- 1981, 2021, 2023

NCAA tournament Round of 16
- 1966, 1981, 2007, 2021, 2023

NCAA tournament appearances
- 1966, 1968, 1971, 1972, 1973, 1981, 1992, 2005, 2006, 2007, 2010, 2011, 2018, 2019, 2021, 2023, 2024, 2025, 2026

Conference tournament championships
- 1966, 1967, 1992, 2019, 2024, 2026

Conference regular season championships
- 2006, 2018, 2024, 2026

The West Virginia Mountaineers men's soccer team is the National Collegiate Athletic Association Division I soccer team of West Virginia University (WVU). Beginning with the 2012 season, the team was an affiliate member of the Mid-American Conference because WVU is the only school in its primary conference, the Big 12 Conference, that has a varsity men's soccer team. For the 2022 season, West Virginia joined in-state rival Marshall in the Sun Belt Conference, and the Mountain State Derby will become an annual conference game. WVU had been scheduled to leave the MAC for Conference USA but this plan was changed when Marshall changed conferences from CUSA to the SBC. When Central Florida joined the Big 12 in 2023, they rejoined the Sun Belt for the sport, creating the Big 12 Derby game with the Knights, and the Big 12-SEC Challenge with Kentucky and South Carolina.

== Coaching staff ==
Position	Staff
Head coach	Dan Stratford
Associate Head Coach	Andy Wright (Note: (7th season))
Assistant	Nick Noble (Note: (5th season))
Strength Coach	Tanner Kolb (Note: (6th season))
Athletic Trainer	Ethan Solger

== Conference membership ==
Source:=

- 1961–1965 — Southern Conference member, soccer Independent
- 1966–1967 — Southern Conference (SoCon had no regular season play at that time, only a conference tournament)
- 1968–1975 — Independent
- 1976–1986 — Atlantic 10 Conference member, soccer Independent
- 1987–1994 — Atlantic 10 Conference
- 1995–2011 — Big East Conference (original)
- 2012–2021 — Big 12 Conference member, Mid-American Conference affiliate in soccer
- 2022–present — Big 12 Conference member, Sun Belt Conference affiliate in soccer

(NOTE: Prior to 1972, the NCAA sponsored only one championship in men's soccer. In 1972, the NCAA began sponsoring a championship in the College Division, which in turn was split into today's Divisions II and III in 1973. The 1972 College Division Tournament was retroactively considered to be the first D-II championship event. WVU remained in competition in the University Division, which was renamed Division I in 1973, and has remained in D-I to this day.)

== Rivalries ==
=== Mountain State Derby ===
West Virginia's biggest rival is Marshall, as the two sides are the only Division 1 men's soccer teams in the state. Both teams are members of the Sun Belt Conference for men's soccer, and matches between the two teams typically draw large crowds.

=== Big 12 / SEC Challenge and Big 12 Derby ===
As West Virginia and UCF are the only two Big 12 schools that sponsor the sport, since 2023, the two teams have in the Sun Belt a derby similar to Kentucky and South Carolina, Southeastern Conference members in that their derby is for the honour of their regular conference. Because of the nature of the orphaned teams, the four teams have another derby, the "Big 12 / SEC Challenge," inside the Sun Belt.

== All-Americans ==
Source:=

- 1967 — Ron McEachen, Defender; NSCAA 1st Team
- 1967 — Walt Nistorenko, Forward; NSCAA 3rd Team
- 1968 — Walt Nistorenko, Forward; NSCAA 1st Team
- 1968 — Pat Sullivan, Defender; NSCAA 1st Team
- 1981 — Jon Capon, Goalkeeper; NSCAA 1st Team
- 2006 — Nick Noble, Goalkeeper; NSCAA 1st Team; College Soccer News 2nd Team
- 2006 — Jarrod Smith, Forward; College Soccer News 1st Team; Soccer America 1st team
- 2007 — Andy Wright, Midfielder; NSCAA 3rd Team; College Soccer News 2nd Team; Soccer America 2nd team
- 2010 — Raymon Gaddis, Defender; Top Drawer Soccer 3rd Team
- 2011 — Eric Schoenle, Defender; NSCAA 3rd Team
- 2012 — Eric Schoenle, Defender; Top Drawer Soccer 3rd Team

== Record by year ==
Record table
Season	Coach	Overall	Conference	Standing	Postseason
Jim Markel (Single Division Independent) (1961–1962)
1961	Jim Markel	2–5–3			
1962	Jim Markel	8–2–0			
Jim Markel:		10–7–3 (.575)			
Sam Maurice (Single Division Independent) (1963–1964)
1963	Sam Maurice	7–3–0			
1964	Sam Maurice	8–2–0			
Sam Maurice:		15–5–0 (.750)			
Greg Meyers (Single Division Independent) (1965–1966)
1965	Greg Meyers	7–5–1			
Greg Meyers (Southern Conference) (1965–1966)
1966	Greg Meyers	13–2–0	Tournament only		NCAA 1st round
Greg Meyers:		20–7–1 (.732)			
John Stewart (Southern Conference) (1967–1967)
1967	John Stewart	11–1–0	Tournament only		
John Stewart (Single Division Independent) (1968–1968)
1968	John Stewart	8–1–1			NCAA 1st round
John Stewart:		19–2–1 (.886)			
John McGrath (Single Division Independent) (1969–1971)
1969	John McGrath	4–5–1			
1970	John McGrath	3–8–0			
1971	John McGrath	9–3–0			NCAA 1st round
John McGrath (Division I Independent) (1972–1986)
1972	John McGrath	10–3–0			NCAA 1st round
1973	John McGrath	10–2–3			NCAA 1st round
1974	John McGrath	5–4–4			
1975	John McGrath	8–5–1			
1976	John McGrath	6–6–1			
1977	John McGrath	2–9–2			
1978	John McGrath	8–6–1			
1979	John McGrath	8–6–2			
1980	John McGrath	10–2–3			
1981	John McGrath	11–5–0			NCAA Quarterfinals
1982	John McGrath	8–7–2			
1983	John McGrath	10–7–1			
1984	John McGrath	5–8–4			
1985	John McGrath	4–12–3			
1986	John McGrath	7–6–3			
John McGrath (Atlantic 10 Conference) (1987–1994)
1987	John McGrath	8–8–2	1–1–1	3rd (West)	
1988	John McGrath	6–11–1	0–3–0	3rd (West)	
1989	John McGrath	9–8–1	1–2–0	3rd (West)	
1990	John McGrath	12–5–1	4–3–1	5th	
1991	John McGrath	9–8–0	3–4–0	6th	
1992	John McGrath	10–7–3	4–3–0	4th	NCAA 1st round
1993	John McGrath	5–12–1	3–4–0	t-6th	
1994	John McGrath	10–9–1	3–4–0	t-4th	
John McGrath (Big East Conference) (1995–1995)
1995	John McGrath	5–9–4	3–5–3	t-8th	
John McGrath:		203–181–44 (.526)	22–29–5		
Paul Marco (Big East Conference) (1996–2000)
1996	Paul Marco	7–12–1	3–7–3	11th	
1997	Paul Marco	7–13–0	3–8–0	11th	
1998	Paul Marco	11–8–1	4–6–1	t-8th	
1999	Paul Marco	13–5–1	8–3–1	3rd	
2000	Paul Marco	4–13–1	1–9–1	12th	
Paul Marco:		42–51–4 (.454)	19–33–6		
Keith Fulk (Big East Conference) (2001–2002)
2001	Keith Fulk	5–11–0	1–9–0	12th	
2002	Keith Fulk	4–11–2	1–8–1	13th	
Keith Fulk:		9–22–1 (.303)	2–17–1		
Mike Seabolt (Big East Conference) (2003–2005)
2003	Mike Seabolt	5–10–3	1–6–3	13th	
2004	Mike Seabolt	12–7–1	5–4–1	t-5th	
2005	Mike Seabolt	13–8–2	6–4–1	t-3rd	NCAA 2nd round
Mike Seabolt:		30–25–6 (.541)	12–14–5		
Marlon LeBlanc (Big East Conference) (2006–2011)
2006	Marlon LeBlanc	15–3–3	9–0–1	1st (Blue) (+1st seed)	NCAA 2nd round
2007	Marlon LeBlanc	14–6–2	7–3–1	3rd (Blue)	NCAA Round of 16
2008	Marlon LeBlanc	5–9–5	3–4–4	5th (Blue)	
2009	Marlon LeBlanc	7–5–6	6–3–2	3rd (Blue)	
2010	Marlon LeBlanc	10–7–2	5–4–0	4th (Blue)	NCAA 2nd round
2011	Marlon LeBlanc	11–8–1	6–3–0	2nd (Blue)	NCAA 2nd round
Marlon LeBlanc (Mid-American Conference) (2012–2019)
2012	Marlon LeBlanc	9–6–1	4–2–1	t-2nd	
2013	Marlon LeBlanc	7–7–5	2–2–2	t-4th	
2014	Marlon LeBlanc	11–7–1	3–1–1	2nd	
2015	Marlon LeBlanc	6–12–0	2–3–0	4th	
2016	Marlon LeBlanc	8–7–1	1–4–0	6th	
2017	Marlon LeBlanc	9–6–4	1–2–2	4th of 6	
2018	Marlon LeBlanc	14–7–0	5–0–0	1st	NCAA 2nd round
2019	Marlon LeBlanc	10–9–2	0–4–1	6th of 6	NCAA 2nd round
Marlon LeBlanc:		127–93–29 (.568)	48–29–12		
Dan Stratford (Mid-American Conference) (2020–2021)
2020	Dan Stratford	6–3–1	4–3–1	3rd	
2021	Dan Stratford	12–3–6	4–1–1	2nd	NCAA quarterfinals
Dan Stratford (Sun Belt Conference) (2022–present)
2022	Dan Stratford	7–7–4	3–1–4	4th	Sun Belt Semifinals
2023	Dan Stratford	17–3–4	5–1–3	3rd	Sun Belt Finalist; NCAA Semifinalist
2024	Dan Stratford	13–2–7	5–0–4	1st	Sun Belt Champions; NCAA Second Round
2025	Dan Stratford	1–0–0	0–0–0		
Dan Stratford:		56–18–22 (.698)	21–6–13		
Total:		531–411–111 (.557)	124–128–42		
National champion Postseason invitational champion Conference regular season champion Conference regular season and conference tournament champion Division regular season champion Division regular season and conference tournament champion Conference tournament champion
