= Old Dominion Monarchs men's soccer =

American college soccer team

Old Dominion Monarchs
- University: Old Dominion University
- Head coach: Tennant McVea (1st season)
- Conference: Sun Belt
- Location: Norfolk, Virginia, US
- Stadium: Old Dominion Soccer Complex (capacity: 4,000)
- Nickname: Monarchs
- Colors: Slate blue, silver, and light blue
Home	Away

NCAA tournament Round of 16
- 2006, 2007

NCAA tournament appearances
- 1989, 1991, 2002, 2003, 2004, 2005, 2006, 2007, 2010, 2011, 2012, 2013, 2014, 2017

Conference tournament championships
- CAA: 1991, 2007; C-USA: 2014, 2017

Conference regular season championships
- CAA: 1999, 2001, 2005

The Old Dominion Monarchs men's soccer team is an intercollegiate varsity sports team of Old Dominion University. The team is an NCAA Division I member of the Sun Belt Conference, having joined in 2022 after moving from Conference USA.

== Seasons ==
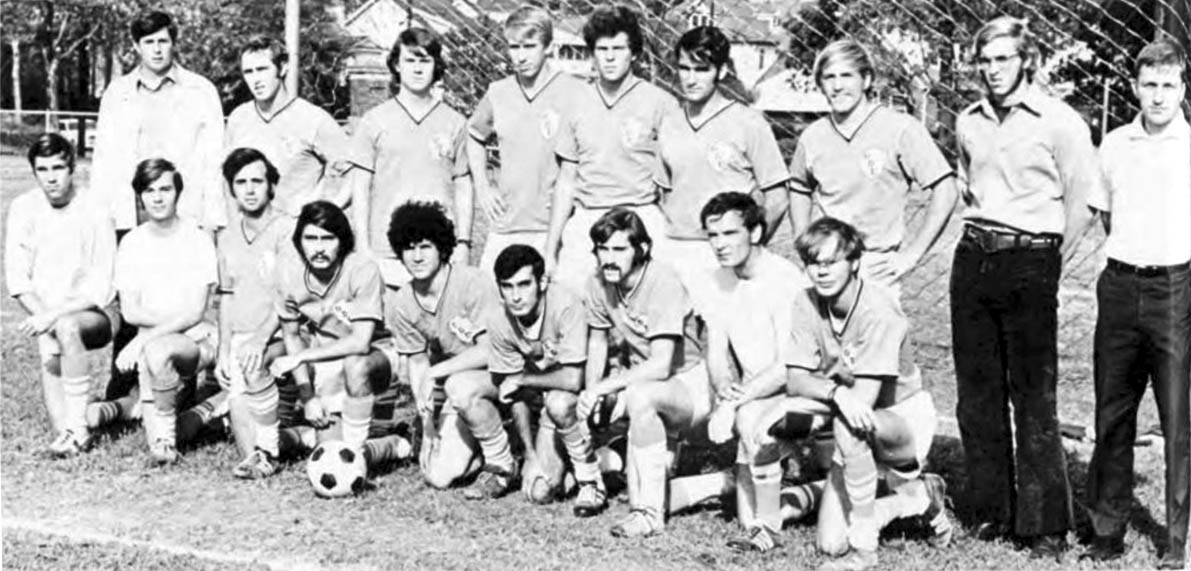
1971 Old Dominion soccer team

Year	Head coach	Overall	Conf.	Conf. record	Conf. place	Conf. tourn	NCAA	Final ranking
1970	Steve Cottrell	5–5	–	–	–	–	–	–
1971	Steve Cottrell	2–6	–	–	–	–	–	–
1972	Gunther Dietz	1–7–1	–	–	–	–	–	–
1973	Gunther Dietz	1–8–1	–	–	–	–	–	–
1974	Gunther Dietz	4–6–1	–	–	–	–	–	–
1975	Gunther Dietz	13–2	–	–	–	–	–	–
1976	Gunther Dietz	8–7	–	–	–	–	–	–
1977	Gunther Dietz	5–6–2	–	–	–	–	–	–
1978	Bill Killen	9–5–1	–	–	–	–	–	–
1979	Bill Killen	10–3–2	–	–	–	–	–	–
1980	Bill Killen	13–5	–	–	–	–	–	–
1981	Bill Killen	7–8–4	–	–	–	–	–	–
1982	Bill Killen	7–8–4	Sun Belt	–	–	–	–	–
1983	Bill Killen	11–7–5	Sun Belt	–	–	–	–	–
1984	Mike Berticelli	13–5–3	Sun Belt	–	–	–	–	–
1985	Mike Berticelli	16–1–3	Sun Belt	–	–	Champion	–	–
1986	Mike Berticelli	13–5–3	Sun Belt	–	1st	SFs	–	–
1987	Mike Berticelli	14–3–2	Sun Belt	2–0–1	1st (East)	Champion	–	–
1988	Mike Berticelli	11–5–3	Sun Belt	2–1	2nd (East)	Runner-up	–	–
1989	Mike Berticelli	14–4–4	Sun Belt	2–0–1	1st (East)	Champion	1st round	19th
1990	Ralph Perez	8–6–6	Sun Belt	5–1–1	2nd	–	–	–
1991	Ralph Perez	18–2–2	CAA	5–0–2	2nd	Champion	1st round	9th
1992	Ralph Perez	11–6–3	CAA	4–2–1	4th	SFs	–	–
1993	Ralph Perez	8–8–5	CAA	2–3–2	6th	Runner-up	–	–
1994	Ralph Perez	10–7–2	CAA	4–3	4th	SFs	–	–
1995	Ralph Perez	10–9–1	CAA	4–3–1	5th	QFs	–	–
1996	Bob Warming	3–17	CAA	2–6	7th	QFs	–	–
1997	Alan Dawson	7–9–1	CAA	3–5	7th	QFs	–	–
1998	Alan Dawson	8–8–2	CAA	3–5	6th	QFs	–	–
1999	Alan Dawson	15–4	CAA	7–1	1st	SFs	–	–
2000	Alan Dawson	10–6–2	CAA	6–1–1	2nd	SFs	–	–
2001	Alan Dawson	8–7–2	CAA	3–0–2	1st	SFs	–	–
2002	Alan Dawson	10–9–4	CAA	6–2–1	3rd	QFs	2nd round	–
2003	Alan Dawson	15–4–1	CAA	6–2–1	2nd	SFs	2nd round	20th
2004	Alan Dawson	13–6–2	CAA	6–2–1	3rd	Runner-up	2nd round	19th
2005	Alan Dawson	15–4–2	CAA	9–1–1	1st	Runner-up	2nd round	21st
2006	Alan Dawson	14–6–2	CAA	7–3–1	2nd	SFs	3rd round	14th
2007	Alan Dawson	14–7–3	CAA	8–2–1	2nd	Champion	3rd round	19th
2008	Alan Dawson	9–7–3	CAA	6–4–1	4th	QFs	–	–
2009	Alan Dawson	11–5–2	CAA	6–3–2	4th	SFs	–	–
2010	Alan Dawson	10–7–2	CAA	5–4–2	5th	–	2nd round	–
2011	Alan Dawson	12–6–2	CAA	7–3–1	2nd	Runner-up	2nd round	24th
2012	Alan Dawson	11–3–3	CAA	5–3–2	4th	–	1st round	–
2013	Alan Dawson	11–6–1	C-USA	7–2	2nd	QFs	1st round	–
2014	Alan Dawson	13–7–1	C-USA	4–3–1	4th	Champion	2nd round	24th
2015	Alan Dawson	8–5–3	C-USA	3–3–2	4th	QFs	–	–
2016	Alan Dawson	6–9–2	C-USA	4–4–1	7th	SFs	–	–
2017	Alan Dawson	13–6–2	C-USA	6–2	2nd	Champion	2nd round	–
2018	Alan Dawson	11–5–2	C-USA	6–2	2nd	SFs	–	–
2019	Alan Dawson	3–11–1	C-USA	1–5–1	8th	–	–	–
2020	Alan Dawson	1–4–3	C-USA	0–4–3	8th	–	–	–
2021	Alan Dawson	3–9–2	C-USA	1–5–2	8th	–	–	–
2022	Alan Dawson	6–8–2	Sun Belt	3–4–1	6th	QFs	–	–
2023	Alan Dawson	5–7–5	Sun Belt	2–6–1	8th	QFs	–	–
2024	Tennant McVea	7–8–2	Sun Belt	3–5–1	7th	QFs	–	–
