= James Madison Dukes men's soccer =

American college soccer team

- 2022 James Madison Dukes men's soccer team
- Founded: 1968
- University: James Madison University
- Head coach: Paul Zazenski (3rd season)
- Conference: Sun Belt
- Location: Harrisonburg, Virginia, US
- Stadium: Sentara Park (capacity: 1,500)
- Nickname: Dukes
- Colors: Purple and gold
| Home | Away |

NCAA tournament Quarterfinals
- 1994, 1995, 2018

NCAA tournament Round of 16
- 1994, 1995, 2011, 2018, 2023

NCAA tournament appearances
- 1971, 1972, 1973, 1976, 1992, 1993, 1994, 1995, 1996, 2000, 2001, 2005, 2011, 2014, 2018, 2019, 2020, 2023

Conference tournament championships
- 1992, 1993, 1994, 2001, 2014, 2018, 2019, 2020

Conference Regular Season championships
- 1991, 1993, 1994, 2000, 2011, 2017, 2018, 2020

The James Madison Dukes men's soccer team is an intercollegiate varsity sports team of James Madison University. As of the 2022 season, the Dukes are members of the National Collegiate Athletic Association Division I Sun Belt Conference. They began play in 1968. The Dukes play their home games at Sentara Park. During the 2011 Colonial Athletic Association men's soccer season, the Dukes won the regular season.

== Notable alumni ==
- Nikola Budalić, former player/manager for Serbian White Eagles of the Canadian Soccer League
- Kevin Knight, former MetroStars player in Major League Soccer (MLS)
- Alan Mayer, former United States men's national soccer team, NASL and MISL player
- Kurt Morsink, former D.C. United player in MLS
- Hal Partenheimer, former Pittsburgh Spirit player in Major Indoor Soccer League
- C. J. Sapong, current player for the Philadelphia Union in MLS. Won the 2011 MLS Rookie of the Year as a member of Sporting Kansas City and was capped twice by the U.S. national team in 2012
- Joel Senior, Jamaica national team, plays for Harbour View F.C. of Jamaica National Premier League
- Carl Strong, former Atlanta Chiefs player of North American Soccer League
- Paul Wyatt, current free agent who most recently played for Oklahoma City Energy of USL Pro
- Nick Zimmerman, former Carolina Railhawks player of North American Soccer League

== Honors ==
- Virginia Intercollegiate Soccer Association Tournament
  - Winners (4): 1972, 1973, 1974, 1975
