= Sun Belt Conference women's soccer tournament =

- Conference soccer championship
- Sport: College soccer
- Conference: Sun Belt Conference
- Number of teams: 8
- Format: Single-elimination tournament
- Current stadium: Foley Sports Complex
- Current location: Foley, Alabama
- Played: 2000–present
- Last contest: 2026
- Current champion: Old Dominion (3rd. title)
- Most championships: South Alabama (8 titles)
- TV partner: ESPN+
- Official website: sunbeltsports.org/wsoc

The Sun Belt Conference women's soccer tournament is the conference championship tournament in soccer for the Sun Belt Conference (SBC). The tournament, which has been held every year since 2000, is played under a single-elimination format with seeding based on conference records. The field expanded from eight to eleven teams for the 2020 and 2021 editions.

Starting in 2022, the tournament reduced back to ten total participating teams. In 2024, the tournament reduced down to eight total teams.The winner, declared conference champion, receives the conference's automatic bid to the NCAA Division I women's soccer championship.

South Alabama is the most winning team of the competition with 8 titles.

== Champions ==
Key

- (1) – Title number
- (a.e.t.) – Match went to extra time
- (p) – Match decided by a penalty shootout after extra time
- – Winning team also won regular season

=== Finals ===
Year	Champion	Score	Runner-up	Venue	City	MVP	Ref.
2000	FIU (1)	3–1	North Texas	The Cage	Mobile, AL	None	
2001	Denver (1)	2–1	North Texas	FIU Soccer Stadium	Miami, FL	Kristin Warren, Denver	
2002	Denver (2)	3–0	North Texas	The Cage	Mobile, AL	Kate Antongiovanni, Denver	
2003	Denver (3)	1–0 (a.e.t.)	North Texas	WKU Soccer Complex	Bowling Green, KY	Lleane Grimditch, Denver	
2004	North Texas (1)	1–0	FIU	FIU Soccer Stadium	Miami, Fl	Alyssa Carrier, North Texas	
2005	North Texas (2)	2–0	South Alabama	The Cage	Mobile, Al	Heather Hutyra, North Texas	
2006	Denver (4)	4–0	North Texas	Ragin' Cajuns Stadium	Lafayette, La	Taryn Hemmings, Denver	
2007	Denver (5)	2–0	North Texas	The Cage	Mobile, Al	Mackenzie Snyder, Denver	
2008	Denver (6)	2–0	Western Kentucky	Soccer Stadium	Denton, Tx	Taryn Hemmings, Denver	
2009	Denver (7)	1–0	Little Rock	FAU Soccer Stadium	Boca Raton, Fl	Kaitlin Bast, Denver	
2010	Middle Tennessee (1)	0–0 (3–2 p)	Denver	WKU Soccer Complex	Bowling Green, Ky	Rebecca Cushing, Middle Tennessee	
2011	FIU (2)	0–0 (4–3 p)	Western Kentucky	Dean A. Hayes Stadium	Murfreesboro, Tn	Nicole DiPerna, FIU	
2012	North Texas (3)	1–0	FIU	The Cage	Mobile, Al	Jackie Kerestine, North Texas	
2013	South Alabama (1)	1–0	Western Kentucky	Bobcat Soccer Complex	San Marcos, Tx	Lauren Allison, South Alabama	
2014	South Alabama (2)	1–0	Troy	Bobcat Soccer Complex	San Marcos, Tx	Chardé Hannah, South Alabama	
2015	South Alabama (3)	4–0	Georgia State	GSU Soccer Field	Emerson, Ga	Chardé Hannah, South Alabama	
2016	South Alabama (4)	2–0	Coastal Carolina	Foley Sports Complex	Foley, Al	Jemma Purfield, South Alabama	
2017	South Alabama (5)	5–0	Coastal Carolina	Foley Sports Complex	Foley, Al	Rio Hardy, South Alabama	
2018	Little Rock (1)	0–0 (6–5 p)	Texas State	Foley Sports Complex	Foley, Al	Jaclyn Purvine, Little Rock	
2019	South Alabama (6)	5–1	Arkansas State	Foley Sports Complex	Foley, Al	Briana Morris, South Alabama	
2020	South Alabama (7)	2–1	Arkansas State	Foley Sports Complex	Foley, Al	Morgan Cross, South Alabama	
2021	South Alabama (8)	1–0	Georgia Southern	Foley Sports Complex	Foley, Al	Gracie Wilson, South Alabama	
2022	Old Dominion (1)	4–3 (a.e.t.)	James Madison	Foley Sports Complex	Foley, Al	Carla Morich, Old Dominion	
2023	Old Dominion (2)	2–1 (a.e.t.)	James Madison	Foley Sports Complex	Foley, Al	Ece Türkoğlu, Old Dominion	
2024	James Madison (1)	3–2	Texas State	Foley Sports Complex	Foley, Al	Shea Collins, James Madison	
2025	Texas State (1)	1–0	ULM	Foley Sports Complex	Foley, Al	Victoria Meza, Texas State	
2026	Old Dominion (3)	2–0	South Alabama	Foley Sports Complex	Foley, Al	Riley Mullen, Old Dominion	

=== By school ===
As of 2026 tournament

School	W	L	T	Pct	Finals	Titles	Title Years
Arkansas State	4	12	5	.310	2	0	—
Appalachian State	5	10	1	.344	0	0	—
Coastal Carolina	5	7	0	.417	2	0	—
Denver	26	4	1	.855	8	7	2001, 2002, 2003, 2006, 2007, 2008, 2009
Florida Atlantic	2	4	0	.333	0	0	—
FIU	10	7	2	.579	4	2	2000, 2011
Georgia Southern	4	7	1	.375	1	0	—
Georgia State	9	10	1	.475	1	0	—
James Madison	7	3	2	.667	3	1	2024
Little Rock	5	10	7	.386	2	1	2018
Louisiana	2	17	2	.143	0	0	—
Louisiana–Monroe	4	4	2	.500	1	0	—
Louisiana Tech	0	0	0	–	0	0	—
Marshall	1	3	0	.250	0	0	—
Middle Tennessee	6	10	4	.400	1	1	2010
North Texas	24	7	0	.774	9	3	2004, 2005, 2012
Old Dominion	9	2	2	.769	3	3	2022, 2023, 2026
South Alabama	31	14	5	.670	10	8	2013, 2014, 2015, 2016, 2017, 2019, 2020, 2021
Southern Miss	0	3	0	.000	0	0	—
Texas State	7	9	5	.450	3	1	2025
Troy	4	11	2	.294	1	0	—
Western Kentucky	13	11	2	.538	3	0	—

Teams in italics not longer sponsor women's soccer in the Sun Belt.
