= 2022 Sun Belt Conference women's soccer tournament =

- Classification: Division I
- Teams: 10
- Matches: 9
- Attendance: 1,704
- Site: Foley Sports Complex; Foley, Alabama
- Champions: Old Dominion (1st title)
- Winning coach: Angie Hind (1st title)
- MVP: Carla Morich (Old Dominion)
- Broadcast: ESPN+

2022 Sun Belt Conference women's soccer standings
	Conf.						Overall
Team	W		L		T	PCT	W		L		T	PCT
East
Georgia Southern ‍†‍‍	7	–	1	–	2	.800	8	–	4	–	5	.618
James Madison ‍‍‍	6	–	1	–	3	.750	12	–	4	–	5	.690
Old Dominion ‍‍‡‍^{y}	5	–	4	–	1	.550	9	–	9	–	3	.500
Appalachian State ‍‍‍	5	–	5	–	0	.500	6	–	9	–	4	.421
Georgia State ‍‍‍	3	–	5	–	2	.400	9	–	7	–	5	.548
Marshall ‍‍‍	2	–	5	–	3	.350	4	–	10	–	5	.342
Coastal Carolina ‍‍‍	2	–	6	–	2	.300	3	–	10	–	4	.294
West
Arkansas State ‍‍‍	7	–	2	–	1	.750	9	–	6	–	3	.583
South Alabama ‍‍‍	6	–	1	–	3	.750	11	–	2	–	7	.725
Texas State ‍‍‍	6	–	3	–	1	.650	12	–	5	–	2	.684
Southern Miss ‍‍‍	2	–	5	–	3	.350	2	–	10	–	4	.250
Louisiana ‍‍‍	2	–	6	–	2	.300	3	–	9	–	5	.324
UL Monroe ‍‍‍	2	–	6	–	2	.300	10	–	6	–	3	.605
Troy ‍‍‍	1	–	6	–	3	.250	3	–	9	–	4	.313
† – Conference champion ‡ – 2022 Sun Belt Tournament champion y – Invited to the NCAA Tournament; As of December 6, 2022; Rankings from United Soccer Coaches Poll; Source:Sun Belt

The 2022 Sun Belt Conference women's soccer tournament was the postseason women's soccer tournament for the Sun Belt Conference held from October 31 to November 6, 2022. The nine-match tournament took place at the Foley Sports Complex in Foley, Alabama. The ten-team single-elimination tournament consisted of four rounds based on seeding from regular season conference play. The defending champions were the South Alabama Jaguars. South Alabama was unable to defend their title falling to Old Dominion in a penalty-shoot out in the Semifinals. Old Dominion would go on to win the tournament, defeating James Madison in extra time in the Final. This was the first Sun Belt women's soccer tournament title for the Old Dominion women's soccer program and the first for head coach Angie Hind. Old Dominion won the Sun Belt Tournament in their first year as part of the conference. As tournament champions, Old Dominion earned the Sun Belt's automatic berth into the 2022 NCAA Division I Women's Soccer Tournament.

== Seeding ==
Ten of the fourteen Sun Belt Conference teams from the regular season qualified for the 2022 Tournament. Seeding was based on regular season records of each team. Although Arkansas State finished with a better regular season record than South Alabama, South Alabama was declared the West Division champions based on points earned against division opponents. A tiebreaker was required to determine the ninth and tenth seeds as Marshall and Southern Miss both finished with 2–5–3 regular season records. Southern Miss was awarded the ninth seed by virtue of their regular season victory over Marshall.

Seed	School	Conference Record	Points
1	Georgia Southern	7–1–2	23
2	South Alabama	6–1–3	21
3	Arkansas State	7–2–1	22
4	James Madison	6–1–3	21
5	Texas State	6–3–1	19
6	Old Dominion	5–4–1	16
7	Appalachian State	5–5–0	15
8	Georgia State	3–5–2	8
9	Southern Miss	2–5–3	7
10	Marshall	2–5–3	7

== Bracket ==
First round Monday, October 31
7	Appalachian State	1
10	Marshall (a.e.t.)	2
8	Georgia State	1
9	Southern Miss	0

Quarterfinals; Wednesday, November 2
2	South Alabama (a.e.t.)	3
10	Marshall	1
3	Arkansas State	0
6	Old Dominion	1
1	Georgia Southern	0
8	Georgia State	1
4	James Madison	1
5	Texas State	0

Semifinals; Friday, November 4
2	Arkansas State	0 (3)
6	Old Dominion (pen.)	0 (4)
8	Georgia State	0
4	James Madison (a.e.t.)	1

Championship; Sunday, November 6
6	Old Dominion (a.e.t.)	4
4	James Madison	3

== Schedule ==
=== First round ===
October 31	#7 Appalachian State	1–2 (a.e.t.)	#10 Marshall	Foley, AL
4:00 p.m. CT	Katie Schumacher (yellow card) 25'; Shannon Studer 45', (yellow card) 60'; Skyler Walk (yellow card) 71'	Report	(yellow card) 18' Team; (yellow card) 45' Alyssa Hardin; 59' Makai Laguines; 92' Kat Gonzalez	Stadium: Foley Sports Complex; Attendance: 245; Referee: Amin Hadzic; Assistant referees: Kendall McCardel; Sam Bilbo; Fourth official: Jonathan Weiner

October 31	#8 Georgia State	1–0	#9 Southern Miss	Foley, AL
7:00 p.m. CT	Jimena Cabrero 58'	Report		Stadium: Foley Sports Complex; Attendance: 276; Referee: Samantha Martinez; Assistant referees: Jennifer Politz; Tim Chaisson; Fourth official: Aaron Hernandez

=== Quarterfinals ===
November 2	#3 Arkansas State	0–1	#6 Old Dominion	Foley, AL
11:00 a.m. CT	Sarah Strong (yellow card) 58'	Report	84' Megan Watts	Stadium: Foley Sports Complex; Attendance: 132; Referee: Will Steffen; Assistant referees: Matthew Rodman; Marie Durr; Fourth official: Kendall McCardell

November 2	#2 South Alabama	3–1 (a.e.t.)	#10 Marshall	Foley, AL
1:30 p.m. CT	Kailey Littleford (yellow card) 68'; Morgan Cross 77', 104' (pen.); Imane Addi (yellow card) 78', (goal) 106'	Report	16' Kat Gonzalez; (yellow card) 80' Campbell George	Stadium: Foley Sports Complex; Attendance: 189; Referee: Jonathan Weiner; Assistant referees: Sam Bilbo; Tim Chaisson; Fourth official: Nick Goyette

November 2	#1 Georgia Southern	0–1	#8 Georgia State	Foley, AL
4:00 p.m. CT		Report	18' Callee Maughon	Stadium: Foley Sports Complex; Attendance: 236; Referee: Anya Voigt; Assistant referees: Jennifer Politz; Katarzyna Wasiak; Fourth official: Marie Durr

November 2	#4 James Madison	1–0	#5 Texas State	Foley, AL
6:30 p.m. CT	Amanda Attanasi 57'	Report		Stadium: Foley Sports Complex; Attendance: 279; Referee: Corey Rockwell; Assistant referees: Rim Chaisson; Nick Goyette; Fourth official: Will Steffen

=== Semifinals ===
November 4	#2 South Alabama	0–0 (a.e.t.) (3–4 p)	#6 Old Dominion	Foley, AL
4:00 p.m. CT	Jasmine Greene (yellow card) 38'; Gabriela Angulo (yellow card) 52'; Danielle Fuentes (yellow card) 58'	Report	(yellow card) 29' Carla Morich	Stadium: Foley Sports Complex; Attendance: 137; Referee: Marie Durr; Assistant referees: John Villalobos; Will Steffen; Fourth official: Tim Chaisson
	Penalties
	Imane Addi (penalty missed); Kate Nicolson (penalty scored); Morgan Cross (penalty scored); Lilly Lowery (penalty scored); Rebecca Calderoni-Martinez (penalty scored); Gracie Wilson (penalty missed)		(penalty scored) Riley Kennett; (penalty missed) Megan Watts; (penalty missed) Carla Morich; (penalty scored) Yuliia Khrystiuk; (penalty scored) Cami Johnstone; (penalty scored) Ece Turkoglu

November 4	#4 James Madison	1–0 (a.e.t.)	#8 Georgia State	Foley, AL
7:00 p.m. CT	Lidia Nduka 104'	Report	(yellow card) 72' Lauren O'Hearn; (yellow card) 74' Brooke Hart; (yellow card) 87' Jimena Cabrero	Stadium: Foley Sports Complex; Attendance: 124; Referee: Samantha Martinez; Assistant referees: Katarzyna Wasiak; Nick Goyette; Fourth official: Jennifer Politz

=== Final ===
November 6	#4 James Madison	3–4 (a.e.t.)	#6 Old Dominion	Foley, AL
1:00 p.m. CT	Amanda Attanasi (yellow card) 29', (goal) 49'; Hannah Young 43' (pen.); Sophia Verrecchia 58' (pen.)	Report	1', 47', 106' Carla Morich; 12' Megan Watts; (yellow card) 58' Riley Kennett	Stadium: Foley Sports Complex; Attendance: 86; Referee: Danielle Chesky; Assistant referees: Jennifer Politz; Nick Goyette; Fourth official: Tim Chiasson

== Statistics ==
=== Goalscorers ===
There were 19 goals scored in 9 matches, for an average of 2.11 goals per match (as of November 6, 2022).

3 goals

- Carla Morich – Old Dominion

2 goals

- Amanda Attanasi – James Madison
- Kat Gonzalez – Marshall
- Megan Watts – Old Dominion
- Morgan Cross – South Alabama

1 goal

- Shannon Studer – Appalachian State
- Jimena Cabrero – Georgia State
- Callee Maughon – Georgia State
- Lidia Nduka– James Madison
- Sophia Verrecchia – James Madison
- Hannah Young – James Madison
- Makai Laguines – Marshall
- Imane Addi– South Alabama

== All-Tournament team ==
Player	Team
Andrea Balcazar Algarin	Old Dominion
Riley Kennett	Old Dominion
**Carla Morich**	Old Dominion
Anna Toerslov	Old Dominion
Ece Turkoglu	Old Dominion
Amanda Attanasi	James Madison
Soleil Flores	James Madison
Suwaibatu Mohammed	James Madison
Lidia Nduka	James Madison
Jaddah Foos	Georgia State
Morgan Cross	South Alabama

MVP in bold
