= 2023 Sun Belt Conference women's soccer tournament =

- Classification: Division I
- Teams: 10
- Matches: 9
- Attendance: 1,365
- Site: Foley Sports Complex; Foley, Alabama
- Champions: Old Dominion (2nd title)
- Winning coach: Angie Hind (2nd title)
- MVP: Ece Türkoğlu (Old Dominion)
- Broadcast: ESPN+

2023 Sun Belt Conference women's soccer standings
	Conf.						Overall
Team	W		L		T	PCT	W		L		T	PCT
East
Georgia Southern ‍‍‍	7	–	3	–	0	.700	12	–	5	–	1	.694
Appalachian State ‍‍‍	6	–	2	–	2	.700	9	–	6	–	3	.583
Old Dominion ‍‍‡‍^{y}	5	–	2	–	3	.650	14	–	3	–	5	.750
James Madison ‍‍‍^{y}	4	–	1	–	5	.650	9	–	5	–	8	.591
Georgia State ‍‍‍	4	–	3	–	3	.550	9	–	5	–	6	.600
Marshall ‍‍‍	2	–	8	–	0	.200	7	–	9	–	1	.441
Coastal Carolina ‍‍‍	0	–	8	–	2	.100	3	–	12	–	2	.235
West
South Alabama ‍†‍‍	8	–	0	–	2	.900	16	–	1	–	3	.875
Louisiana–Monroe ‍‍‍	4	–	1	–	5	.650	9	–	2	–	8	.684
Texas State ‍‍‍	3	–	3	–	4	.500	9	–	7	–	4	.550
Southern Miss ‍‍‍	3	–	4	–	3	.450	6	–	9	–	3	.417
Louisiana ‍‍‍	4	–	6	–	0	.400	7	–	8	–	2	.471
Arkansas State ‍‍‍	2	–	5	–	3	.350	4	–	8	–	4	.375
Troy ‍‍‍	1	–	7	–	2	.200	6	–	10	–	2	.389
† – Conference champion ‡ – 2023 Sun Belt Tournament champion y – Invited to the NCAA Tournament; As of December 5, 2023; Rankings from United Soccer Coaches Poll; Source: Sun Belt

The 2023 Sun Belt Conference women's soccer tournament was the postseason women's soccer tournament for the Sun Belt Conference held from October 30 to November 5, 2023. The nine-match tournament took place at the Foley Sports Complex in Foley, Alabama. The ten-team single-elimination tournament consisted of four rounds based on seeding from regular season conference play. The defending champions were the Old Dominion Monarchs. Old Dominion successfully defended their title as the second overall seed in the tournament. They defeated James Madison 2–1 in (overtime) in the Final. This was the second Sun Belt women's soccer tournament title for the Old Dominion women's soccer program, both of which have come under head coach Angie Hind. This was Old Dominion's third straight conference title as they won the Conference USA title in 2021 before moving to the Sun Belt Conference. As tournament champions, Old Dominion earned the Sun Belt's automatic berth into the 2023 NCAA Division I Women's Soccer Tournament.

== Seeding ==
Ten of the fourteen Sun Belt Conference teams from the regular season qualified for the 2023 Tournament. Seeding was based on regular season records of each team. Although Old Dominion finished with seventeen conference points, they were determined to be the East Division Champion based on points earned in division play. The division winners were determined by points from division play and awarded the top two seeds. Then the remaining teams were seeded based on all conference play. A tiebreaker was required to determine the fifth and sixth seeds as James Madison and Louisiana–Monroe both finished with identical 4–1–5 regular season conference records. The two teams tied their regular season meeting 0–0, so a second tiebreaker of points won against the highest seed was used as a second tiebreaker. The highest seeded team that both teams played was Georgia State. James Madison tied with Georgia State 0–0, while Louisiana–Monroe lost to Georgia State 0–1. Therefore, James Madison was awarded the fifth seed. A tiebreaker was required to determine the ninth and tenth seeds as Louisiana and Southern Miss both finished with twelve conference points. Louisiana defeated Southern Miss 2–1 in their regular season meeting and was therefore awarded the ninth seed.

Seed	School	Conference Record	Points
1	South Alabama	8–0–2	26
2	Old Dominion*	5–3–2	17*
3	Georgia Southern	7–3–0	21
4	Appalachian State	6–2–2	20
5	James Madison	4–1–5	17
6	Louisiana–Monroe	4–1–5	17
7	Georgia State	4–3–3	15
8	Texas State	3–3–4	13
9	Louisiana	4–6–0	12
10	Southern Miss	3–4–3	12

(*: division winners are automatically given the top two seeds).

== Bracket ==
First round Monday, October 30
7	Georgia State	1
10	Southern Miss	0
8	Texas State	2
9	Louisiana	1

Quarterfinals; Wednesday, November 1
2	Old Dominion	1
7	Georgia State	0
3	Georgia Southern (pen.)	1 (4)
6	Louisiana–Monroe	1 (3)
1	South Alabama	2
8	Texas State	1
4	Appalachian State	1
5	James Madison (a.e.t.)	2

Semifinals; Friday, November 3
2	Old Dominion	2
3	Georgia Southern	1
1	South Alabama	0
5	James Madison	1

Championship; Sunday, November 5
2	Old Dominion (a.e.t.)	2
5	James Madison	1

== Schedule ==
=== First round ===
October 30	#7 Georgia State	1–0	#10 Southern Miss	Foley, AL
4:00 p.m. CT	Olivia Shaw 75'	Report	(yellow card) 90' Chloe Taylor	Stadium: Foley Sports Complex; Attendance: 175; Referee: Aaron Hernandez; Assistant referees: Kendall McCardell; Katazyna Wasiak; Fourth official: Lorenzo Hernandez

October 30	#8 Texas State	2–1	#9 Louisiana	Foley, AL
7:00 p.m. CT	Olivia Wright 30'; Mary Soumare 72'	Report	88' Hailly Waterhouse	Stadium: Foley Sports Complex; Attendance: 85; Referee: Alexander Connolly; Assistant referees: Nicholas Goyette; Brynnen Keel; Fourth official: Christopher Heintzman

=== Quarterfinals ===
November 1	#3 Georgia Southern	1–1 (a.e.t.) (4–3 p)	#6 Louisiana–Monroe	Foley, AL
11:00 a.m. CT	Sade Heinrichs (yellow card) 75'; Bri Conley 81'	Report	13', (yellow card) 88' Inge Konst; (yellow card) 24' Ally Richardson; (yellow card) 77' Skylar Blaise	Stadium: Foley Sports Complex; Attendance: 50; Referee: Nicholas Goyette; Assistant referees: Sam Bilbo; Christopher Heintzman; Fourth official: Jennifer Politz
	Penalties
	Elis Nemtsov (penalty scored); Bri Conley (penalty missed); Isabel Kopp (penalty scored); Ansleigh Crenshaw (penalty scored); Maya Zovko (penalty scored)		(penalty missed) Inge Konst; (penalty scored) Libby Holmes; (penalty scored) Lena Goppel; (penalty missed) Emelie Kobler; (penalty scored) Eve Blakey

November 1	#2 Old Dominion	1–0	#7 Georgia State	Foley, AL
1:30 p.m. CT	Malia Mariano (yellow card) 63'; Ashlynn Kulha 84'	Report		Stadium: Foley Sports Complex; Attendance: 120; Referee: David Elliot; Assistant referees: Tim Chaisson; Ryan Campbell; Fourth official: Brynnen Keel

November 1	#1 South Alabama	2–1	#8 Texas State	Foley, AL
4:00 p.m. CT	Monique Gray 11'; Chiara Singarella 51'	Report	(yellow card) 24' Victoria Meza; 47' Mya Ulloa	Stadium: Foley Sports Complex; Attendance: 200; Referee: Christopher Heintzman; Assistant referees: Jennifer Politz; Brynnen Keel; Fourth official: Nicholas Goyette

November 1	#4 Appalachian State	1–2 (a.e.t.)	#5 James Madison	Foley, AL
6:30 p.m. CT	Sarah Widderich (yellow card) 87'; Stephanie Barbosa 88'	Report	63', 98' Jeanette Fieldsend; (yellow card) 104' Suwaibatu Mohammed	Stadium: Foley Sports Complex; Attendance: 110; Referee: Mario Maric; Assistant referees: Ryan Campbell; Tim Chiasson; Fourth official: David Elliot

=== Semifinals ===
November 3	#2 Old Dominion	2–1	#3 Georgia Southern	Foley, AL
4:00 p.m. CT	Rhea Kijowski 13'; Thalia Morisi 14'; Katie McCormick (yellow card) 56'; Madison Micheletti (yellow card) 83'	Report	25' Ansleigh Crenshaw; (yellow card) 56' Maya Zovko; (yellow card) 64' Carley Borgelt; (yellow card) 65' Team	Stadium: Foley Sports Complex; Attendance: 210; Referee: Mario Maric; Assistant referees: Jennifer Politz; Tim Chaisson; Fourth official: Abdoy Ndiyae

November 3	#1 South Alabama	0–1	#5 James Madison	Foley, AL
7:00 p.m. CT	Sydney Ham (yellow card) 30'	Report	70' Sophia Verrecchia	Stadium: Foley Sports Complex; Attendance: 205; Referee: David Elliot; Assistant referees: Jessica Carnevale; Aaron Fong; Fourth official: Abdou Ndiyae

=== Final ===
November 5	#2 Old Dominion	2–1 (a.e.t.)	#5 James Madison	Foley, AL
1:00 p.m. CT	Ece Türkoğlu 62', (yellow card) 100'; Katie McCormick (yellow card) 74'; Sydney Somers 109'	Report	52' Suwaibatu Mohammed; (yellow card) 74' Sophia Verrecchia	Stadium: Foley Sports Complex; Attendance: 210; Referee: Abdou Ndiyae; Assistant referees: Jennifer Politz; Tim Chiasson; Fourth official: David Elliot

== Statistics ==
=== Goalscorers ===
There were 20 goals scored in 9 matches, for an average of 2.22 goals per match (as of November 5, 2023).

2 goals

- Jeanette Fieldsend – James Madison

1 goal

- Stephanie Barbosa – Appalachian State
- Bri Conley – Georgia Southern
- Ansleigh Crenshaw – Georgia Southern
- Olivia Shaw – Georgia State
- Suwaibatu Mohammed – James Madison
- Sophia Verrecchia – James Madison
- Hailly Waterhouse – Louisiana
- Inge Konst – Louisiana–Monroe
- Rhea Kijowski – Old Dominion
- Ashlynn Kulha – Old Dominion
- Thalia Morisi – Old Dominion
- Sydney Somers – Old Dominion
- Ece Türkoğlu – Old Dominion
- Monique Gray – South Alabama
- Chiara Singarella – South Alabama
- Mary Soumare – Texas State
- Mya Ulloa – Texas State
- Olivia Wright – Texas State

== All-Tournament team ==
Player	Team
Abby Jacobs	Georgia Southern
Kamryn Nobles	Georgia Southern
Alexandra Blom	James Madison
Jeanette Fieldsend	James Madison
Brittany Munson	James Madison
Anessa Arndt	Old Dominion
Andrea Balcazar Algarin	Old Dominion
Malia Mariano	Old Dominion
Thalia Morisi Kennett	Old Dominion
**Ece Türkoğlu**	Old Dominion
Abby Jacobs	South Alabama
Chiara Singarella	South Alabama

MVP in bold
