= 2024 Sun Belt Conference women's soccer tournament =

- Classification: Division I
- Teams: 8
- Matches: 7
- Attendance: 773
- Site: Foley Sports Complex; Foley, Alabama
- Champions: James Madison (1st title)
- Winning coach: Joshua Walters (1st title)
- MVP: Shea Collins (James Madison)
- Broadcast: ESPN+

2024 Sun Belt Conference women's soccer standings
	Conf.						Overall
Team	W		L		T	PCT	W		L		T	PCT
East
James Madison ‍†‍‡‍^{y}	8	–	0	–	2	.900	12	–	4	–	5	.690
Old Dominion ‍‍‍	5	–	2	–	3	.650	10	–	6	–	4	.600
Georgia State ‍‍‍	4	–	2	–	4	.600	5	–	7	–	7	.447
Appalachian State ‍‍‍	4	–	3	–	3	.550	7	–	7	–	5	.500
Coastal Carolina ‍‍‍	3	–	3	–	4	.500	8	–	7	–	6	.524
Georgia Southern ‍‍‍	3	–	6	–	1	.350	6	–	11	–	2	.368
Marshall ‍‍‍	1	–	5	–	4	.300	3	–	8	–	5	.344
West
Texas State ‍‍‍	6	–	1	–	3	.750	12	–	5	–	5	.659
South Alabama ‍‍‍	5	–	2	–	3	.650	10	–	6	–	3	.605
UL Monroe ‍‍‍	3	–	5	–	2	.400	9	–	8	–	3	.525
Southern Miss ‍‍‍	2	–	3	–	5	.450	3	–	7	–	5	.367
Louisiana ‍‍‍	2	–	4	–	4	.400	7	–	5	–	8	.550
Arkansas State ‍‍‍	1	–	5	–	4	.300	4	–	6	–	6	.438
Troy ‍‍‍	1	–	7	–	2	.200	5	–	9	–	3	.382
† – Conference champion ‡ – 2024 Sun Belt Tournament champion y – Invited to the NCAA Tournament; As of December 10, 2024; Rankings from United Soccer Coaches Poll; Source:Sun Belt

The 2024 Sun Belt Conference women's soccer tournament was the postseason women's soccer tournament for the Sun Belt Conference held from November 4 to November 9, 2024. The seven-match tournament took place at the Foley Sports Complex in Foley, Alabama. The eight-team single-elimination tournament consisted of four rounds based on seeding from regular season conference play. The defending champions were the Old Dominion Monarchs. Old Dominion was the fourth seed in the tournament and were unsuccessful at defending their title. They were defeated 1–0 by James Madison in the semifinals. James Madison would go on to win the final over Texas State 3–2. This was the first Sun Belt women's soccer tournament title for the James Madison women's soccer program, and first for head coach Joshua Walters. It is James Madison's fifth overall women's soccer title as they won four titles in the CAA before moving to the Sun Belt Conference. As tournament champions, James Madison earned the Sun Belt's automatic berth into the 2024 NCAA Division I women's soccer tournament.

== Seeding ==
The top eight of the fourteen Sun Belt Conference teams from the regular season qualified for the 2024 Tournament. Seeding was based on regular season records of each team. The two division winners were awarded the top two seeds in the tournament. Despite finishing with 21 overall conference points, Texas State was the third seed as South Alabama score fourteen division conference points, which was more than Texas State's twelve division conference points. Therefore, South Alabama was the second seed in the tournament. A tiebreaker was required to determine the eighth and final seed in the tournament as Louisiana–Monroe and Southern Miss both finished with 11 regular season conference points. Louisiana–Monroe defeated Southern Miss 3–0 on the final day of the regular season to secure the final seed in the tournament.

Seed	School	Conference Record	Points
1	James Madison	8–0–2	26
2	South Alabama*	5–2–3	18*
3	Texas State	6–1–3	21
4	Old Dominion	5–2–3	18
5	Georgia State	4–2–4	16
6	Appalachian State	4–3–3	15
7	Coastal Carolina	3–3–4	13
8	Louisiana–Monroe	3–5–2	11

(*: division winners are automatically given the top two seeds).

== Bracket ==
Quarterfinals; Monday, November 4
3	Texas State	2
6	Appalachian State	0
2	South Alabama	1
7	Coastal Carolina	2
1	James Madison (pen.)	0 (4)
8	Louisiana–Monroe	0 (3)
4	Old Dominion (pen.)	1 (3)
5	Georgia State	1 (1)

Semifinals; Wednesday, November 6
3	Texas State	4
7	Coastal Carolina	0
1	James Madison	1
4	Old Dominion	0

Championship; Saturday, November 9
3	Texas State	2
1	James Madison	3

== Schedule ==
=== Quarterfinals ===
November 4, 2024	#3 Texas State	2–0	#6 Appalachian State	Foley, AL
11:00 a.m. CST	Mya Ulloa 24'; Zoe Junior (yellow card) 49'; Mady Soumare 49'	Report	(yellow card) 76' Walker Bristow	Stadium: Foley Sports Complex; Attendance: 243; Referee: Aaron Hernandez; Assistant referees: Jennifer Politz; Ethan Wilson; Fourth official: Lila Remache

November 4, 2024	#2 South Alabama	1–2	#7 Coastal Carolina	Foley, AL
1:30 p.m. CST	Bonnie Frost 58'; Irene Campo (yellow card) 82'	Report	5', 24' Julia Ziegenfuss	Stadium: Foley Sports Complex; Attendance: 223; Referee: Dorian Del Toro Urueta; Assistant referees: Chana Forstall; Esmeralda Figueroa; Fourth official: Tim Chiasson

November 4, 2024	#1 James Madison	0–0 (a.e.t.) (4–3 p)	#8 Louisiana–Monroe	Foley, AL
4:30 p.m. CST	Ellie Farrell (yellow card) 41'	Report	(yellow card) 16' Janne Van Brummelen; (yellow card) 39' Bernadett Stefan	Stadium: Foley Sports Complex; Attendance: 25; Referee: Lila Renache; Assistant referees: Ethan Wilson; Jennifer Politz; Fourth official: Arnel Selman
	Penalties
	Ginny Lackey (penalty missed); Amanda Attanasi (penalty missed); Tali Rovner (penalty scored); Sophia Verrecchia (penalty scored); Ellie Farrell (penalty scored); Jamie Swartz (penalty scored)		(penalty missed) Ally Richardson; (penalty scored) Emelie Kobler; (penalty missed) Beth Strutton; (penalty scored) Jaden Masters; (penalty scored) Janne van Brummelen; (penalty missed) Bernadett Stefan

November 4, 2024	#4 Old Dominion	1–1 (a.e.t.) (3–1 p)	#5 Georgia State	Foley, AL
7:00 p.m. CST	Georgia State Own Goal 69'; Andrea Balcazar Algarin (yellow card) 109'	Report	45' Elena Diaz; (yellow card) 95' Emily Glenn	Stadium: Foley Sports Complex; Attendance: 32; Referee: Nicholas Goyette; Assistant referees: Tim Chiasson; Esmeralda Figueroa; Fourth official: Ryan Campbell
	Penalties
	Brooke Edwards (penalty scored); Sydney Somers (penalty scored); Rhea Kijowski (penalty scored)		(penalty scored) Aaliyah Faddoul; (penalty missed) Elena Diaz; (penalty missed) Ines de Lope Casanova; (penalty missed) Maria Andujar

=== Semifinals ===
November 6, 2024	#3 Texas State	4–0	#7 Coastal Carolina	Foley, AL
4:00 p.m. CST	Lily Erb 4'; Mya Ulloa 10'; Victoria Meza (yellow card) 27', (goal) 51'; Lucy Hart (yellow card) 35'; Kaylie Smith 65' (pen.)	Report	(yellow card) 50' Sophia Skoubis	Stadium: Foley Sports Complex; Referee: Lila Remache; Assistant referees: Sam Bilbo; Nicholas Goyette; Fourth official: Jennifer Politz

November 7, 2024	#1 James Madison	1–0	#4 Old Dominion	Mobile, AL
7:00 p.m. CST	Ginny Lackey 8'	Report	(yellow card) 36' Gry Boe Thrysoe	Stadium: The Cage; Attendance: 90; Referee: Samantha Martinez; Assistant referees: Esmeralda Figureoa; Tim Chiasson; Fourth official: Jennifer Politz

=== Final ===
November 9, 2024	#1 James Madison	3–2	#3 Texas State	Foley, AL
7:00 p.m. CST	Shea Collins 5', 89'; Sophia Verrecchia 13'	Report	22' (pen.) Mya Ulloa; 55' Zoe Junior; (yellow card) 66' Haley Shaw; (yellow card) 85' Mady Soumare	Stadium: Foley Sports Complex; Attendance: 160; Referee: Dorian Del Toro Urueta; Assistant referees: Laadi Issaka; Josh Hinkle; Fourth official: Lila Remache

== Statistics ==
=== Goalscorers ===
There were 17 goals scored in 7 matches, for an average of 2.43 goals per match (as of November 9, 2024).

3 goals

- Mya Ulloa – Texas State

2 goals

- Shea Collins – James Madison
- Julia Ziegenfuss – Coastal Carolina

1 goal

- Elena Diaz – Georgia State
- Lily Erb – Texas State
- Bonnie Frost – South Alabama
- Zoe Junior – Texas State
- Ginny Lackey – James Madison
- Victoria Meza – Texas State
- Kaylie Smith – Texas State
- Mady Soumare – Texas State
- Sophia Verrecchia – James Madison

1 own goal

- Georgia State (vs. Old Dominion)

== All-Tournament team ==
Player	Team
Ashton Eleanor	Coastal Carolina
Julia Ziegenfuss	Coastal Carolina
**Shea Collins**	James Madison
Sofia DeCerb	James Madison
Ginny Lackey	James Madison
Sophia Verrecchia	James Madison
Jordan Yang	James Madison
Gry Boe Thrysoe	Old Dominion
Katie Lutz	Old Dominion
Kennley Bradley	Texas State
Mady Soumare	Texas State

MVP in bold
