= 2018 Sun Belt Conference women's soccer tournament =

2019 Sun Belt Conference women's soccer tournament
- Classification: Division I
- Teams: 8
- Matches: 7
- Site: Foley Sports Complex; Foley, Alabama
- Champions: Little Rock (1st title)
- Winning coach: Mark Foster (1st title)
- MVP: Jaclyn Purvine (Little Rock)
- Broadcast: ESPN+

2019 Sun Belt Conference women's soccer standings
	Conf.						Overall
Team	W		L		T	PCT	W		L		T	PCT
South Alabama ‍†‍‡‍^{y}	8	–	1	–	1	.850	16	–	4	–	2	.773
Troy ‍‍‍	7	–	1	–	2	.800	12	–	3	–	4	.737
Arkansas State ‍‍‍	5	–	2	–	3	.650	10	–	5	–	4	.632
Coastal Carolina ‍‍‍	5	–	4	–	1	.550	7	–	9	–	2	.444
Georgia State ‍‍‍	5	–	4	–	1	.550	9	–	9	–	2	.500
Texas State ‍‍‍	5	–	4	–	1	.550	9	–	7	–	3	.553
Louisiana ‍‍‍	4	–	4	–	2	.500	9	–	8	–	3	.525
Georgia Southern ‍‍‍	3	–	6	–	1	.350	6	–	11	–	1	.361
Little Rock ‍‍‍	2	–	4	–	4	.400	5	–	8	–	6	.421
Appalachian State ‍‍‍	2	–	6	–	2	.300	5	–	10	–	3	.361
UL Monroe ‍‍‍	0	–	10	–	0	.000	3	–	13	–	2	.222
† – Conference champion ‡ – 2019 Sun Belt Tournament champion y – Invited to the NCAA tournament As of December 9, 2019; Rankings from United Soccer Coaches Poll; Source:Sun Belt

The 2019 Sun Belt Conference women's soccer tournament was the postseason women's soccer tournament for the Sun Belt Conference held from October 31 to November 4, 2019. The seven-match tournament took place at the Foley Sports Complex in Foley, Alabama. The eight-team single-elimination tournament consisted of three rounds based on seeding from regular season conference play. The defending champions were the South Alabama Jaguars, however they were unable to defend their title, losing in a penalty kick shootout to the Texas State Bobcats in the semifinals. The Arkansas-Little Rock Trojans won the title in another penalty kick shootout over Texas State. This was the first Sun Belt women's soccer tournament title for Little Rock and the first for head coach Mark Foster.

== Bracket ==
Quarterfinals; Wednesday, Oct. 31
4	Appalachian State	0
5	South Alabama	3
1	Texas State	1
8	Troy	0
2	Little Rock	1 (4)
7	Arkansas State	1 (3)
3	Coastal Carolina	2
6	Georgia State	3^{OT}

Semifinals; Friday, Nov. 2
5	South Alabama	1 (2)
1	Texas State	1 (4)
2	Little Rock	2
6	Georgia State	0

Final; Sunday, Nov. 4
1	Texas State	0 (5)
2	Little Rock	0 (6)

== Schedule ==
=== Quarterfinals ===
October 31, 2019	#4 Appalachian State	0–3	#5 South Alabama	Foley, Alabama
10:00 a.m. CST	Jessia Easley (red card) 68'; Taylor Ray (red card) 68'	Report	Audrey Duren (yellow card) 35'; Abi Mills 39'; Ana Helmert 44', (yellow card) 68'; Briana Morris 57'	Stadium: Foley Sports Complex; Referee: Karen Abt; Assistant referees: Olivia Urig; Tiffini Turbin; Fourth official: Alyssa Pennington

October 31, 2019	#1 Texas State	1–0	#8 Troy	Foley, Alabama
1:00 p.m. CST	Kaylee Davis 62', (yellow card) 88'	Report		Stadium: Foley Sports Complex; Referee: Ashlee Varnson; Assistant referees: Kate Wasiak; Kayla Polonsky; Fourth official: Samantha Martinez

October 31, 2019	#2 Little Rock	1–1 (a.e.t.) (4–3 p)	#7 Arkansas State	Foley, Alabama
4:00 p.m. CST	Liesa Seifert 57'	Report	Hailey Furio 11'	Stadium: Foley Sports Complex; Referee: Alyssa Pennington; Assistant referees: Alicia Messer; Olivia Urig; Fourth official: Ashlee Varnson
	Penalties
	Liesa Seifert (penalty scored); Jaclyn Purvine (penalty missed); Arola Aparicio Gill (penalty scored); Sairra Tucker (penalty scored); Nora Hellmers (penalty scored)		Dana O'Boye (penalty missed); Hailey Furio (penalty scored); Riley Ebenroth (penalty scored); Taylor Schneider (penalty scored); Maggie Ertl (penalty missed)

October 31, 2019	#3 Coastal Carolina	2–3 (a.e.t.)	#6 Georgia State	Foley, Alabama
7:00 p.m. CST	Abby Gashel 7'; Hannah Miller 60'	Report	Lily Barron 4'; Caitlin Ray 81'; Brooke Shank (yellow card) 31', 93'	Stadium: Foley Sports Complex; Referee: Samantha Martinez; Assistant referees: Tiffini Tupin; Kayla Polonsky; Fourth official: Ceciah Valero

=== Semifinals ===
November 2, 2019	#5 South Alabama	1–1 (a.e.t.) (2–4 p)	#1 Texas State	Foley, Alabama
4:00 p.m. CST	Moa Ohman 17'; Brenna McPartlan (yellow card) 88'	Report	Jessica Pikoff (yellow card) 57'; Kaylee Davis 73' (pen.)	Stadium: Foley Sports Complex; Referee: Ceciah Valero; Assistant referees: Olivia Urig; Ashlee Varnson; Fourth official: Samantha Martinez
	Penalties
	Moa Ohman (penalty missed); Brenna McPartlan (penalty scored); Hannah Godfrey (penalty missed); Tilly Wilkes (penalty scored)		Ally Kewish (penalty scored); Kaylee Davis (penalty scored); Jordan Kondikoff (penalty scored); Mackenzie Smith (penalty scored)

November 2, 2019	#2 Little Rock	2–0	#6 Georgia State	Foley, Alabama
7:00 p.m. CST	Peyton Laughley (yellow card) 38'; Jaclyn Purvine 53', 64'	Report	Hannah Davis (yellow card) 36'	Stadium: Foley Sports Complex; Referee: Kayla Polonsky; Assistant referees: Tiffini Turpin; Alyssa Pennington; Fourth official: Samantha Martinez

=== Final ===
November 4, 2019	#1 Texas State	0–0 (a.e.t.) (5–6 p)	#2 Little Rock	Foley, Alabama
1:00 p.m. CST		Report	Fanney Einarsdotir (yellow card) 109'	Stadium: Foley Sports Complex; Referee: Samantha Martinez; Assistant referees: Olivia Urig; Tiffini Turpin; Fourth official: Alyssa Pennington
	Penalties
	Ally Kewish (penalty scored); Kaylee Davis (penalty scored); Jordan Kondikoff (penalty missed); Mackenzie Smith (penalty scored); Sarah Everett (penalty scored); Jamie Brown (penalty scored); Haley Groff (penalty missed); Kelly Barbalias (penalty missed)		Liesa Seifert (penalty scored); Morgan Smocovich (penalty scored); Arola Aparicio Gili (penalty missed); Sairra Tucker (penalty scored); Nora Hellmers (penalty scored); Jaclyn Purvine (penalty scored); Fanney Einarsdotir (penalty missed); Claire Palmer (penalty scored)

== Statistics ==
=== Goalscorers ===
2 Goals

- Kaylee Davis – Texas State
- Jaclyn Purvine – Little Rock

1 Goal

- Lily Barron – Georgia State
- Hailey Furio – Arkansas State
- Abby Gashel – Coastal Carolina
- Ana Helmert - South Alabama
- Hannah Miller – Coastal Carolina
- Abi Mills - South Alabama
- Briana Morris - South Alabama
- Moa Ohman - South Alabama
- Caitlin Ray – Georgia State
- Liesa Seifert – Little Rock

== All-Tournament team ==
Player	Team
Caitlin Ray	Georgia State
Briana Morris	South Alabama
Kaylee Davis	Texas State
Heather Martin	Texas State
Jordan Kondikoff	Texas State
Genesis Turman	Texas State
Sara Johannsdottir	Little Rock
Morgan Smocovich	Little Rock
Liesa Siefert	Little Rock
Arola Aparicio Gili	Little Rock
Jaclyn Purvine	Little Rock (MVP)

== See also ==
- 2019 Sun Belt Conference Men's Soccer Tournament
