= 2021 Sun Belt Conference women's soccer tournament =

- Classification: Division I
- Teams: 11
- Matches: 10
- Attendance: 1,490
- Site: Foley Sports Complex; Foley, Alabama
- Champions: South Alabama (8th title)
- Winning coach: Richard Moodie (4th title)
- MVP: Gracie Wilson (South Alabama)
- Broadcast: ESPN+

2021 Sun Belt Conference women's soccer standings
	Conf.						Overall
Team	W		L		T	PCT	W		L		T	PCT
Arkansas State ‍†‍‍	7	–	2	–	1	.750	10	–	6	–	2	.611
South Alabama ‍‍‡‍^{y}	6	–	2	–	2	.700	12	–	5	–	3	.675
Georgia State ‍‍‍	4	–	1	–	5	.650	10	–	4	–	6	.650
Georgia Southern ‍‍‍	4	–	3	–	3	.550	11	–	7	–	4	.591
Coastal Carolina ‍‍‍	4	–	5	–	1	.450	6	–	9	–	2	.412
Texas State ‍‍‍	4	–	5	–	1	.450	7	–	7	–	2	.500
Little Rock ‍‍‍	3	–	4	–	3	.450	7	–	7	–	6	.500
Louisiana–Monroe ‍‍‍	4	–	6	–	0	.400	8	–	12	–	0	.400
Troy ‍‍‍	4	–	6	–	0	.400	8	–	10	–	1	.447
Louisiana ‍‍‍	3	–	5	–	2	.400	6	–	10	–	3	.395
Appalachian State ‍‍‍	2	–	8	–	0	.200	7	–	11	–	1	.395
† – Conference champion ‡ – 2021 Sun Belt Tournament champion y – Invited to the NCAA Tournament; As of December 7, 2021; Rankings from United Soccer Coaches Poll; Source:Sun Belt

The 2021 Sun Belt Conference women's soccer tournament was the postseason women's soccer tournament for the Sun Belt Conference held from November 1 to November 7, 2021. The ten-match tournament took place at the Foley Sports Complex in Foley, Alabama. The eleven-team single-elimination tournament consisted of four rounds based on seeding from regular season conference play. The defending champions were the South Alabama Jaguars. South Alabama successfully defended their title with a 1–0 championship game win over Georgia Southern in the final. This was the eighth Sun Belt women's soccer tournament title for the South Alabama women's soccer program and the fourth for head coach Richard Moodie. Eight of the last nine Sun Belt Women's Soccer Tournaments have been won by South Alabama. As tournament champions, South Alabama earned the Sun Belt's automatic berth into the 2021 NCAA Division I Women's Soccer Tournament.

== Seeding ==
All eleven teams in the Sun Belt Conference participated in the 2021 Tournament. Seeding was based on regular season conference record. A tiebreaker was required to determine the fifth and sixth seeds of the tournament as Coastal Carolina and Texas State both finished with 4–5–1 conference records. Coastal Carolina was awarded the fifth seed and Texas State earned the sixth seed. It is unclear why this was the case as Texas State defeated Coastal Carolina on September 16. A tiebreaker was also required to determine the eighth and ninth seeds as Louisiana–Monroe and Troy finished with identical 4–6–0 regular season records. Troy defeated Louisiana-Monroe on October 28, but was awarded the ninth seed and Louisiana-Monroe was given the eight seed in the tournament.

Seed	School	Conference Record	Points
1	Arkansas State	7–2–1	22
2	South Alabama	6–2–2	20
3	Georgia State	4–1–5	17
4	Georgia Southern	4–3–3	15
5	Coastal Carolina	4–5–1	13
6	Texas State	4–5–1	13
7	Little Rock	3–4–3	12
8	Louisiana–Monroe	4–6–0	12
9	Troy	4–6–0	12
10	Louisiana	3–5–2	11
11	Appalachian State	2–8–0	6

== Bracket ==
First round Monday, Nov. 1
8	Louisiana–Monroe	1
9	Troy	0
6	Texas State	1
11	Appalachian State (a.e.t.)	2
7	Little Rock (p)	1 (3)
10	Louisiana	1 (0)

Quarterfinals; Wednesday, Nov. 3
1	Arkansas State	1
8	Louisiana–Monroe	2
4	Georgia Southern	1
5	Coastal Carolina	0
3	Georgia State (a.e.t.)	2
11	Appalachian State	1
2	South Alabama (p)	1 (3)
7	Little Rock	1 (1)

Semifinals; Friday, Nov. 5
8	Louisiana–Monroe	1
4	Georgia Southern	2
3	Georgia State	0
2	South Alabama	1

Final; Sunday, Nov. 7
4	Georgia Southern	0
2	South Alabama	1

== Schedule ==
=== First round ===
November 1, 2021	#6 Texas State	1–2	#11 Appalachian State	Foley, AL
1:30 p.m. CT	Kiara Gonzales 21'	Report	10' Breckyn Monteith; 53' Audrey Viso	Stadium: Foley Sports Complex; Attendance: 150; Referee: Katarzyna Wasiak; Assistant referees: Ryan Starr; Larry Pachon; Fourth official: Jennifer Politz

November 1, 2021	#7 Little Rock	1–1 (a.e.t.) (3–0 p)	#10 Louisiana	Foley, AL
4:00 p.m. CT	Abril Lucio 77', (yellow card) 83'; Julia Edholm (yellow card) 79'	Report	85' Karleen Bedre; (yellow card) 94' Lucy Ortiz	Stadium: Foley Sports Complex; Attendance: 150; Referee: Shannon O'Carroll; Assistant referees: Kendall McCardell; Craig Lowery; Fourth official: Ryan Starr
	Penalties
	Abril Lucio (penalty scored); Bergros Asgeirsdottir (penalty scored); Fanney Einarsdottir (penalty scored)		(penalty missed) Alyssa Abbott; (penalty missed) Carol Rodriguez; (penalty missed) Hailey Daigle

November 1, 2021	#8 Louisiana–Monroe	1–0	#9 Troy	Foley, AL
6:30 p.m. CT	Allison Worley (yellow card) 29'; Theoni Zerva 38' (pen.)	Report	(yellow card) 3' Mara Grutkamp; (yellow card) 42' Eva Lauret	Stadium: Foley Sports Complex; Attendance: 150; Referee: Jonathan Weiner; Assistant referees: Matthew Rodman; Jennifer Politz; Fourth official: Samantha Martinez

=== Quarterfinals ===
November 3, 2021	#3 Georgia State	2–1 (a.e.t.)	#11 Appalachian State	Foley, AL
11:00 a.m. CT	Eva Diez Lois 26', 93'	Report	45' Breckyn Monteith; (yellow card) 90' Mumu Guisasola	Stadium: Foley Sports Complex; Attendance: 125; Referee: Matthew Thompson; Assistant referees: Sam Bilbo; Kendall McCardell; Fourth official: Shannon O'Carroll

November 3, 2021	#2 South Alabama	1–1 (a.e.t.) (3–1 p)	#7 Little Rock	Foley, AL
1:30 p.m. CT	Little Rock Own Goal 88' (o.g.)	Report	78' Jana Heinen	Stadium: Foley Sports Complex; Attendance: 150; Referee: Elvis Mahmutovic; Assistant referees: Larry Pachon; Jennifer Politz; Fourth official: Johnathan Weiner
	Penalties
	Imane Addi (penalty scored); Morgan White (penalty scored); Gabrielle Gayle (penalty scored); Nora Sanchez (penalty missed)		(penalty missed) Abril Lucio; (penalty scored) Bergros Asgeirsdottir; (penalty missed) Fanney Einarsdottir; (penalty missed) Julia Edholm

November 3, 2021	#1 Arkansas State	1–2	#8 Louisiana–Monroe	Foley, AL
4:00 p.m. CT	Sarah Sodoma 73'; Abigail Miller (yellow card) 85'	Report	10' Mara Grutkamp; (yellow card) 54' Paula Guba; 69' Taylor Henry; (yellow card) 80' Daisy Drake	Stadium: Foley Sports Complex; Attendance: 120

November 3, 2021	#4 Georgia Southern	1–0	#5 Coastal Carolina	Foley, AL
6:30 p.m. CT	Marcela Montoya 46'	Report		Stadium: Foley Sports Complex; Attendance: 150; Referee: Samantha Martinez; Assistant referees: Larry Pachon; Katarzyna Wasiak; Fourth official: Jennifer Politz

=== Semifinals ===
November 5, 2021	#2 South Alabama	1–0	#3 Georgia State	Foley, AL
4:00 p.m. CT	Claudia Gutierrez 50'; Gracie Wilson (yellow card) 88'	Report		Stadium: Foley Sports Complex; Attendance: 200; Referee: Mark Kadlecik; Assistant referees: Kendall McCardell; Shannon O'Carroll; Fourth official: Tim Chiasson

November 5, 2021	#4 Georgia Southern	2–1	#8 Louisiana–Monroe	Foley, AL
7:00 p.m. CT	ULM Own Goal 47' (o.g.); Vala Theodorsdottir 51'	Report	37' Paula Guba	Stadium: Foley Sports Complex; Attendance: 120; Referee: Emma Richards; Assistant referees: Larry Pachon; Jennifer Politz; Fourth official: John Matto

=== Final ===
November 7, 2021	#2 South Alabama	1–0	#4 Georgia Southern	Foley, AL
1:00 p.m. CT	Gracie Wilson 56'	Report	(yellow card) 80' Team	Stadium: Foley Sports Complex; Attendance: 175; Referee: John Matto; Assistant referees: Larry Pachon; Shannon O'Carroll; Fourth official: Emma Richards

== Statistics ==
=== Goalscorers ===
There were 20 goals scored in 10 matches, for an average of 2 goals per match (as of November 7, 2021).

2 goals

- Breckyn Monteith – Appalachian State
- Eva Diez Lois – Georgia State

1 goal

- Audrey Viso – Appalachian State
- Sarah Sodoma – Arkansas State
- Marcela Montoya – Georgia Southern
- Vala Theodorsdottir – Georgia Southern
- Jana Heinen – Little Rock
- Abril Lucio – Little Rock
- Karleen Bedre – Louisiana
- Paula Guba – Louisiana-Monroe
- Mara Grutkamp – Louisiana-Monroe
- Taylor Henry – Louisiana-Monroe
- Theoni Zerva – Louisiana-Monroe
- Glaudia Gutierrez – South Alabama
- Gracie Wilson – South Alabama
- Kiara Gonzales – Texas State

2 own goals

- Little Rock (vs. South Alabama)
- Louisiana-Monroe (vs. Georgia Southern)

== All-Tournament team ==
Player	Team
**Gracie Wilson**	South Alabama
Jaidy Gutierrez	South Alabama
Kate Nicolson	South Alabama
Monique Gray	South Alabama
Claudia Gutierrez	South Alabama
Marcela Montoya	Georgia Southern
Michaela English	Georgia Southern
Sade Heinrichs	Georgia Southern
Olivia Durham	Georgia Southern
Jimena Cabrero	Georgia State
Mara Grutkamp	Louisiana–Monroe

MVP in bold
