= 2020 Sun Belt Conference women's soccer tournament =

American women's college soccer postseason tournament

- Classification: Division I
- Teams: 11
- Matches: 10
- Site: Foley Sports Tourism Complex; Foley, Alabama
- Champions: South Alabama (7th title)
- Winning coach: Richard Moodie (3rd title)
- MVP: Morgan Cross (South Alabama)
- Broadcast: ESPN+

2020 Sun Belt Conference women's soccer standings
	Conf.						Overall
Team	W		L		T	PCT	W		L		T	PCT
East
South Alabama ‍†‍‍	8	–	2	–	0	.800	10	–	3	–	1	.750
Georgia State ‍‍‍	6	–	2	–	2	.700	10	–	3	–	2	.733
Coastal Carolina ‍‍‍	6	–	4	–	0	.600	6	–	5	–	0	.545
Appalachian State ‍‍‍	4	–	6	–	0	.400	5	–	9	–	1	.367
Georgia Southern ‍‍‍	3	–	6	–	1	.350	3	–	10	–	1	.250
Troy ‍‍‍	1	–	8	–	1	.150	2	–	9	–	1	.208
West
Arkansas State ‍†‍‍	7	–	0	–	1	.938	10	–	2	–	1	.808
Louisiana ‍‍‍	4	–	3	–	1	.563	9	–	5	–	1	.633
Texas State ‍‍‍	4	–	4	–	0	.500	4	–	9	–	1	.321
Little Rock ‍‍‍	3	–	3	–	2	.500	4	–	5	–	3	.458
Louisiana–Monroe ‍‍‍	0	–	8	–	0	.000	0	–	10	–	0	.000
† – Conference champion ‡ – 2020 Sun Belt Tournament champion As of November 12, 2020; Rankings from United Soccer Coaches Poll; Source: Sun Belt Conference

The 2020 Sun Belt women's soccer tournament was the postseason tournament for the Sun Belt Conference women's soccer team. The tournament was held over four days from November 2 to 8 at the Foley, Alabama. The South Alabama Jaguars successfully defended their title by defeating Arkansas State 2–1 in the final, securing their seventh Sun Belt tournament championship in the last eight years.

== Teams ==
East Division
Seed	School	Record (Conf.)
1	South Alabama Jaguars	10–3–1 (8–2–0)
2	Georgia State Panthers	10–3–2 (6–2–2)
3	Coastal Carolina Chanticleers	6–5–0 (6–4–0)
4	Appalachian State Mountaineers	5–9–1 (4–6–0)
5	Georgia Southern Eagles	3–10–1 (3–6–1)
6	Troy Trojans	2–9–1 (1–8–1)

West Division
Seed	School	Record (Conf.)
1	Arkansas State Red Wolves	10–2–1 (7–0–1)
2	Louisiana Ragin' Cajuns	9–5–1 (4–3–1)
3	Texas State Bobcats	4–9–1 (4–4–0)
4	Little Rock Trojans	4–5–3 (3–3–2)
5	Louisiana–Monroe Warhawks	0–10–0 (0–8–0)

== Bracket ==
First round Monday, November 2
5E	Georgia Southern	1
4W	Little Rock	2
4E	Appalachian State	2**
5W	Louisiana–Monroe	1
3W	Texas State	0
6E	Troy	1*

Quarterfinals; Wednesday, November 4
1E	South Alabama	2 (4)
4W	Little Rock	2 (3)
3E	Coastal Carolina	0
2W	Louisiana	3
1W	Arkansas State	1
4E	Appalachian State	0
2E	Georgia State	6
6E	Troy	1

Semifinals; Friday, November 6
1E	South Alabama	4
2W	Louisiana	1
1W	Arkansas State	1
2E	Georgia State	0

Championship; Sunday, November 8
1E	South Alabama	2
1W	Arkansas State	1

== Match summaries ==
All matches were played at Foley Sports Tourism Complex in Foley, Alabama. All times are Central.

=== First Round ===
November 2, 2020	Georgia Southern (5E)	1–2	(4W) Little Rock	Foley, Alabama
1:30 p.m.	Taylor Regensburger 34' (red card) 75'; Sade Heinrichs (yellow card) 59'; Sarah Alexander (yellow card) 66'	Report	Mariella Stephens 7', 10'	Stadium: Foley Sports Tourism Complex; Attendance: 130; Referee: Mario Cabrera; Assistant referees: Larry Pachon; Nami Imaizumi; Fourth official: Michael Smith

November 2, 2020	Appalachian State (4E)	2–1 (a.e.t.)	(5W) Louisiana–Monroe	Foley, Alabama
4:00 p.m.	Izzi Wood 47'; Jordan Grigsby 109'	Report	Janet Stopka 5'; Taylor Altieri (yellow card) 52'; Victori Altieri (yellow card) 63'; Kathryn Yarbrough (yellow card) 100'	Stadium: Foley Sports Tourism Complex; Attendance: 200; Referee: Tyler Mitcham; Assistant referees: Ashlee Varnson; Michael Smith; Fourth official: Sam Bilbo

November 2, 2020	Texas State (3W)	0–1 (a.e.t.)	(6E) Troy	Foley, Alabama
6:30 p.m.		Report	Karina Valeriano (yellow card) 71'; Erin Bloomfield 96'	Stadium: Foley Sports Tourism Complex; Attendance: 200; Referee: Jonathan Sauers; Assistant referees: Larry Pachon; Sam Bilbo; Fourth official: Mario Cabrera

=== Quarterfinals ===
November 4, 2020	Coastal Carolina (3E)	0–3	(2W) Louisiana	Foley, Alabama
11:00 a.m.		Report	Hailey Hoffmann 31'; Mya Smith 53'; Alyssa Abbott 71'	Stadium: Foley Sports Tourism Complex; Attendance: 140; Referee: Matthew Thompson; Assistant referees: Michael Smith; Larry Pachon; Fourth official: Alexander Connelly

November 4, 2020	South Alabama (1E)	2–2 (a.e.t.) (4–3 p)	(4W) Little Rock	Foley, Alabama
1:30 p.m.	Brenna McPartlan 17', 21'	Report	Mariella Stephens 18'; Doro Greulich (yellow card) 23'; Astros Luckas 87'	Stadium: Foley Sports Tourism Complex; Attendance: 200; Referee: Tyler Mitcham; Assistant referees: Louie Tran; Ashlee Varnson; Fourth official: Jennifer Politz
	Penalties
	Brenna McPartlan (penalty scored); Leandra Flury (penalty scored); Gabrielle Gayle (penalty scored); Gracie Wilson (penalty missed); Olivia Wilkes (penalty scored)		(penalty missed) Natalee Geren; (penalty scored) Morgan Smocovich; (penalty scored) Abril Lucio; (penalty scored) Maddy Peake; (penalty missed) Astros Luckas

November 4, 2020	Arkansas State (1W)	1–0	(4E) Appalachian State	Foley, Alabama
4:00 p.m.	Sarah Sodoma 24'	Report	Kirsten Seeley (yellow card) 55'; Kaitlyn Little (yellow card) 78'	Stadium: Foley Sports Tourism Complex; Attendance: 200; Referee: Mario Cabrera; Assistant referees: Larry Pachon; Michael Smith; Fourth official: Jennifer Politz

November 4, 2020	Georgia State (2E)	6–1	(6E) Troy	Foley, Alabama
6:30 p.m.	Lily Barron 10'; Jimena Cabrero 12' (yellow card) 12'; Maggie Hanusek 45'; Grace Kiser (yellow card) 58'; Jocelyn Jones 71'; Brooke Hart 84'; Maddie Johnston 87'	Report	Melissa Kuya-Strobel (yellow card) 33' (goal) 69'; Lindsey LaRoche (yellow card) 53'; Regielly Holldorsdottir (yellow card) 65'	Stadium: Foley Sports Tourism Complex; Attendance: 200; Referee: Alexander Connelly; Assistant referees: Ashlee Varnson; Louie Tran; Fourth official: Tyler Mitcham

=== Semifinals ===
November 6, 2020	Louisiana (2W)	1–4	(1E) South Alabama	Foley, Alabama
4:00 p.m.	Ashley Newland 6'; Una Einarsdottir (yellow card) 74'	Report	Brenna McPartlan 32' (pen.); Ana Helmert 45'; Matilda Ovenberger 54'; Gracie Wilson 71'	Stadium: Foley Sports Tourism Complex; Attendance: 200; Referee: William Heidke; Assistant referees: Larry Pachon; Ashlee Varnson; Fourth official: Jennifer Politz

November 6, 2020	Arkansas (1W)	1–0	(2E) Georgia State	Foley, Alabama
7:00 p.m.	Maggie Ertl (yellow card) 29'; Olivia Smith 33'; Darby Stotts (yellow card) 74'	Report	Lexie Knox (yellow card) 30'; Meggie Hanusek (yellow card) 56'	Stadium: Foley Sports Tourism Complex; Attendance: 200; Referee: Alexander Connelly; Assistant referees: Robert Mann; Louie Tran; Fourth official: Jennifer Politz

=== Championship ===
November 8, 2020	Arkansas State (1W)	1–2	(1E) South Alabama	Foley, Alabama
1:00 p.m.	Hailey Cloud 48'; Olivia Smith (yellow card) 52' (yellow-red card) 65'	Report	Morgan Cross 85', 88'	Stadium: Foley Sports Tourism Complex; Attendance: 250; Referee: Kayla Polonsky; Assistant referees: Larry Pachon; William Heidke; Fourth official: Jennifer Politz

== See also ==
- Sun Belt Conference
- 2020 NCAA Division I women's soccer season
- 2020 NCAA Division I Women's Soccer Tournament
