= 2019 Sun Belt Conference women's soccer tournament =

- Classification: Division I
- Teams: 8
- Matches: 7
- Attendance: 930
- Site: Foley Sports Complex; Foley, Alabama
- Champions: South Alabama (6th title)
- Winning coach: Richard Moodie (2nd title)
- MVP: Briana Morris (South Alabama)
- Broadcast: ESPN+

2019 Sun Belt Conference women's soccer standings
	Conf.						Overall
Team	W		L		T	PCT	W		L		T	PCT
South Alabama ‍†‍‡‍^{y}	8	–	1	–	1	.850	16	–	4	–	2	.773
Troy ‍‍‍	7	–	1	–	2	.800	12	–	3	–	4	.737
Arkansas State ‍‍‍	5	–	2	–	3	.650	10	–	5	–	4	.632
Coastal Carolina ‍‍‍	5	–	4	–	1	.550	7	–	9	–	2	.444
Georgia State ‍‍‍	5	–	4	–	1	.550	9	–	9	–	2	.500
Texas State ‍‍‍	5	–	4	–	1	.550	9	–	7	–	3	.553
Louisiana ‍‍‍	4	–	4	–	2	.500	9	–	8	–	3	.525
Georgia Southern ‍‍‍	3	–	6	–	1	.350	6	–	11	–	1	.361
Little Rock ‍‍‍	2	–	4	–	4	.400	5	–	8	–	6	.421
Appalachian State ‍‍‍	2	–	6	–	2	.300	5	–	10	–	3	.361
UL Monroe ‍‍‍	0	–	10	–	0	.000	3	–	13	–	2	.222
† – Conference champion ‡ – 2019 Sun Belt Tournament champion y – Invited to the NCAA tournament As of December 9, 2019; Rankings from United Soccer Coaches Poll; Source:Sun Belt

The 2019 Sun Belt Conference women's soccer tournament was the postseason women's soccer tournament for the Sun Belt Conference held from November 6 to November 10, 2019. The seven-match tournament took place at the Foley Sports Complex in Foley, Alabama. The eight-team single-elimination tournament consisted of three rounds based on seeding from regular season conference play. The defending champions were the Arkansas-Little Rock Trojans, however they were unable to defend their title after finishing ninth in regular season play and failing to qualify for the tournament. The South Alabama Jaguars won the title with a 5–1 win over Arkansas State in the final. This was the sixth Sun Belt women's soccer tournament title for the South Alabama women's soccer program and the second for head coach Richard Moodie.

== Bracket ==
Quarterfinals; Wednesday, Nov. 6
1	South Alabama	2
8	Georgia Southern	0
4	Coastal Carolina	0
5	Georgia State	1
2	Troy	0
7	Louisiana	3
3	Arkansas State	0 (4)
6	Texas State	0 (1)

Semifinals; Friday, Nov. 8
1	South Alabama	1
5	Georgia State	0
7	Louisiana	0
3	Arkansas State	1

Final; Sunday, Nov. 10
1	South Alabama	5
3	Arkansas State	1

== Schedule ==
=== Quarterfinals ===
November 6, 2019	#3 Arkansas State	0–0 (a.e.t.) (4–1 p)	#6 Texas State	Foley, Alabama
10:00 a.m. CT	Olivia Smith (yellow card) 101'	Report		Stadium: Foley Sports Complex; Attendance: 215; Referee: Jonathan Sauers; Assistant referees: Kate Wasiak; Jon Skinner; Fourth official: DeShun Beard
	Penalties
	Dana O'Boye (penalty scored); Megan McClure (penalty scored); Hannah Maupin (penalty scored); Sarah Sodoma (penalty scored)		(penalty missed) Kaylee Davis; (penalty scored) Mackenzie Smith; (penalty missed) Jordan Kondikoff

November 6, 2019	#2 Troy	0–3	#7 Louisiana	Foley, Alabama
1:00 p.m. CT	Nathali Dasilva (yellow card) 8'; Kendra Cashion (yellow card) 16'	Report	9' Karleen Bedre; 60' Gwen Mummert; 67' Rachel Sutter	Stadium: Foley Sports Complex; Referee: Juliana Duncan; Assistant referees: Kendall McCardell; Ryan Starr; Fourth official: Jonathan Weiner

November 6, 2019	#1 South Alabama	2–0	#8 Georgia Southern	Foley, Alabama
4:00 p.m. CT	Tabea Griss 8'; Briana Morris 79'	Report	(yellow card) 32' Maddie Klintworth	Stadium: Foley Sports Complex; Referee: DeShun Beard; Assistant referees: Jon Skinner; Jennifer Politz; Fourth official: Jonathan Sauers

November 6, 2019	#4 Coastal Carolina	0–1	#5 Georgia State	Foley, Alabama
7:00 p.m. CT	Caeden Price (yellow card) 18'; Hannah Miller (yellow card) 88'	Report	78' Jimena Cabrero	Stadium: Foley Sports Complex; Attendance: 200; Referee: Samantha Martinez; Assistant referees: Sam Bilbo; Kendall McCardell; Fourth official: Andrew Musashe

=== Semifinals ===
November 8, 2019	#3 Arkansas State	1–0	#7 Louisiana	Foley, Alabama
4:00 p.m. CT	Hailey Furio 88'	Report	(yellow card) 81' Kaylie Powell; (yellow card) 84' Una Einarsdottir	Stadium: Foley Sports Complex; Attendance: 215; Referee: Kayla Polonsky; Assistant referees: Jon Skinner; DeShun Beard; Fourth official: Jonathan Weiner

November 8, 2019	#1 South Alabama	1–0	#5 Georgia State	Foley, Alabama
7:00 p.m. CT	Brenna McPartlan 23'	Report		Stadium: Foley Sports Complex; Referee: Andrew Musashe; Assistant referees: Jonathan Sauers; Kendall McCardell; Fourth official: Ryan Starr

=== Final ===
November 10, 2019	#1 South Alabama	5–1	#3 Arkansas State	Foley, Alabama
1:00 p.m. CT	Moa Öhman 12', 50'; Arkansas State Own Goal 18'; Briana Morris 25'; Brenna McPartlan 48'	Report	(red card) 25' Olivia Smith; 42' Sarah Sodoma; (yellow card) 53' Fanney Einarsdottir	Stadium: Foley Sports Complex; Attendance: 300; Referee: Jonathan Weiner; Assistant referees: Jon Skinner; Kendall McCardell; Fourth official: Jonathan Sauers

== Statistics ==
=== Goalscorers ===
2 Goals

- Brenna McPartlan (South Alabama)
- Briana Morris (South Alabama)
- Moa Öhman (South Alabama)

1 Goal

- Karleen Bedre (Louisiana)
- Jimena Cabrero (Georgia State)
- Hailey Furio (Arkansas State)
- Tabea Griss (South Alabama)
- Gwen Mummert (Louisiana)
- Rachel Sutter (Louisiana)

Own Goals

- Arkansas State vs. South Alabama

== All-Tournament team ==
Player	Team
Hailey Furio	Arkansas State
Megan McClure	Arkansas State
Olivia Smith	Arkansas State
Sarah Sodoma	Arkansas State
Brooke Shank	Georgia State
Gwen Mummert	Louisiana
Tabea Griss	South Alabama
Justice Stanford	South Alabama
Brenna McPartlan	South Alabama
Moa Öhman	South Alabama
**Briana Morris**	South Alabama

MVP in bold

== See also ==
- 2019 Sun Belt Conference Men's Soccer Tournament
