= Big Blue (mascot) =

Mascot for the Old Dominion Monarchs

- University: Old Dominion University
- Conference: Sun Belt
- Description: Anthropomorphic Lion

Big Blue is the official mascot for the Old Dominion Monarchs. He is an anthropomorphic lion that performs at Old Dominion University athletic events, fundraisers, and commencement ceremonies. The nickname and mascot for the "Monarchs" was adopted just prior to ODU's split from the College of William & Mary system in 1961. In 1971, Old Dominion officially crowned Big Blue as their mascot to represent symbols of pride and courage for the expanding athletic program.

While the first iterations of the mascot created split reactions from Monarchs fans, a more friendly appearance of the mascot was introduced in the 1980s. He is typically seen wearing a basketball or football jersey with the number '00' and a blue crown.

In 2011, Big Blue won Capital One National Mascot of the Year, which awarded $20,000 to Old Dominion's mascot program.

In 2013, A statue of Big Blue was placed in the university's Webb Center, where students are encouraged to rub his belly for good luck and prosperity.

Big Blue is incorporated within the university's athletic foundation, which includes a kids club and locally sponsored 5K run named in his honor.
