= ULM Soccer Complex =

Soccer field in Monroe, Louisiana

- Interactive map of ULM Soccer Complex
- Location: Monroe, LA
- Coordinates: 32°31′48.7″N 92°03′46.1″W
- Owner: University of Louisiana at Monroe
- Operator: University of Louisiana at Monroe
- Capacity: 500
- Surface: Bermuda and Rye grass
- Scoreboard: Daktronics
- Record attendance: 278 vs. Belhaven College
- Field size: 120x80

Construction
- Opened: August 27, 2006

Tenant
- Louisiana–Monroe Warhawks women's soccer (2006-2018)

The ULM Soccer Complex was the former home field of the Louisiana-Monroe Warhawks Women's Soccer team, built in 2006. The complex features covered bench areas for both teams and a press box, with seating for 500 spectators and standing room for many more. ULM soccer field was the first home of ULM women's soccer and it saw its first action on Aug. 27, 2006, as ULM played McNeese State University, but lost 0–2.

The soccer field received a new scoreboard in 2011

The team moved to Brown Stadium at the start of the 2019 season.

== See also ==
- List of soccer stadiums in the United States
