= Ken Szotkiewicz =

American baseball player (born 1947)

- Shortstop
- Born: February 25, 1947 (age 79); Wilmington, Delaware, U.S.
- Batted: Left Threw: Right

MLB debut
- April 7, 1970, for the Detroit Tigers

Last MLB appearance
- September 21, 1970, for the Detroit Tigers

MLB statistics
- Batting average: .107
- Home runs: 3
- Runs batted in: 9
- Stats at Baseball Reference

Teams
- Detroit Tigers (1970)

Kenneth John Szotkiewicz (last name pronounced sɑkəwɪts, born February 25, 1947) is an American former Major League Baseball shortstop, who played in 47 games for the Detroit Tigers in 1970. Played collegiately for the Georgia Southern Eagles.

== Sources ==
- Career statistics from Baseball Reference · Baseball Reference (Minors) · Retrosheet · Baseball Almanac
