= Old Dominion Monarchs =

Intercollegiate sports teams of Old Dominion University

- University: Old Dominion University
- Nickname: Monarchs
- NCAA: Division I (FBS)
- Conference: Sun Belt (primary) List: American (women's lacrosse); ASUN (swimming & diving); Big 12 (women's rowing); Big East (field hockey); MAISA (sailing)
- Athletic director: Camden Wood Selig
- Location: Norfolk, Virginia
- Varsity teams: 18
- Football stadium: S.B. Ballard Stadium
- Basketball arena: Chartway Arena
- Baseball stadium: Bud Metheny Ballpark
- Soccer stadium: Old Dominion Soccer Complex
- Aquatics center: J.C. Scrap Chandler Natatorium
- Lacrosse field: L.R. Hill Sports Complex
- Rowing venue: ODU Rowing Center
- Sailing venue: ODU Sailing Center
- Tennis venue: Folkes-Stevens Tennis Center
- Volleyball arena: ODU Volleyball Center
- Colors: Slate blue, silver, and light blue
- Mascot: Big Blue
- Fight song: Fight, Old Dominion!
- Website: odusports.com

Sun Belt Conference logo in ODU's colors

The Old Dominion Monarchs are composed of 18 intercollegiate athletic teams representing Old Dominion University, located in Norfolk, Virginia. Men's sports include baseball, basketball, football, golf, sailing, soccer, swimming, and tennis. Women's sports include basketball, field hockey, lacrosse, golf, sailing, soccer, swimming, tennis, rowing, and volleyball. The Monarchs compete in the NCAA Division I Football Bowl Subdivision (FBS) and are members of the Sun Belt Conference (SBC); the university joined the conference on July 1, 2022.

In 2017, the university announced it would add Women's Volleyball as a scholarship sport, slated to compete beginning in 2020. The university discontinued wrestling in April 2020 after a study on the athletic department's sport sponsorship, combined with added financial pressure from the coronavirus pandemic.

== Sports sponsored ==
Men's sports	Women's sports
Baseball	Basketball
Basketball	Field hockey
Football	Lacrosse
Golf	Golf
Sailing	Sailing
Soccer	Soccer
Swimming	Swimming
Tennis	Tennis
	Rowing
	Volleyball

=== Men's basketball ===
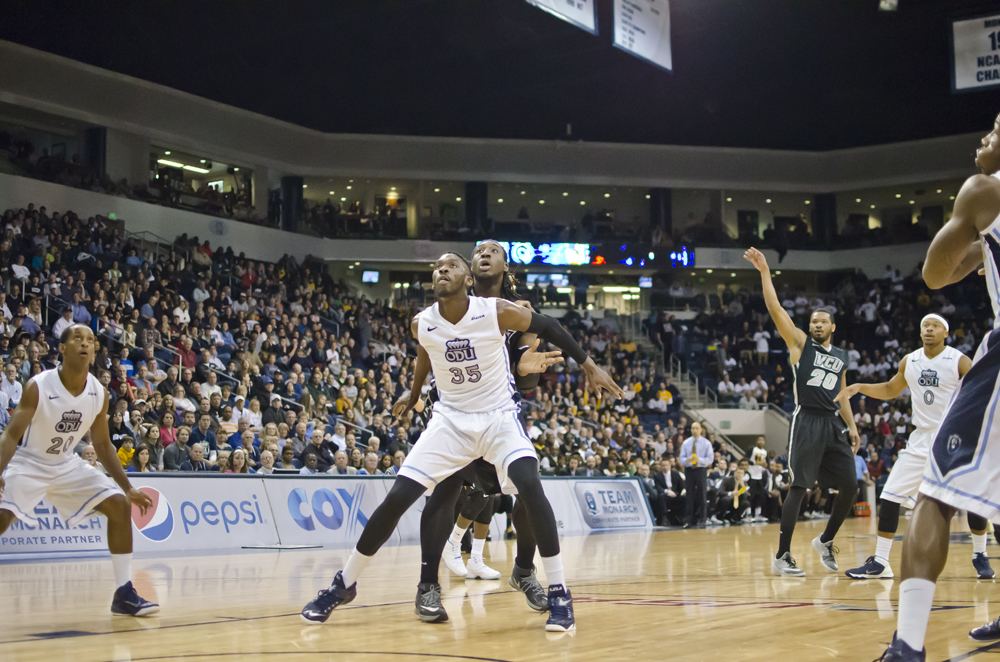
Old Dominion v VCU basketball game, 2014

The Old Dominion University Monarchs men's basketball team have captured six CAA championship titles (1992, 1995, 1997, 2005, 2010, and 2011) since their conference admission in 1992, which is the most among all CAA schools. The Monarchs received an at-large bid to the 2007 NCAA tournament when the team went 24–8 and finished 37th in RPI. That season included a notable 13-point win at eighth ranked Georgetown. They received an automatic bid to the 2010 NCAA tournament after capturing the 2010 CAA title. During the tournament, the 11th seeded Monarchs managed a 1-point first-round upset over the sixth seeded Fighting Irish of Notre Dame.

In 2002, ODU opened the Ted Constant Convocation Center (now Chartway Arena) for the 2002–2003 basketball season. "The Ted" seats 8,639 for basketball games with 7,319 fully cushioned seats, 862 upper club seats, and 16 suites. In addition to home basketball games, the arena hosts family-oriented events, concerts, lectures, and commencement ceremonies.

=== Women's basketball ===
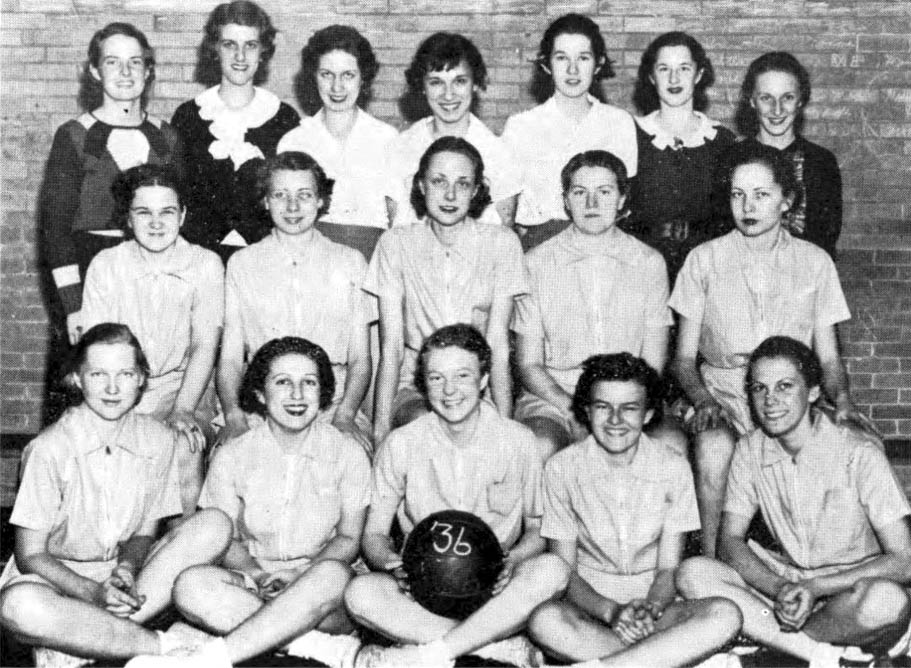
1936 women's basketball team

Old Dominion awarded the first athletic varsity scholarship to a female in the state of Virginia to Nancy Lieberman for Monarchs women's basketball.

The Old Dominion Lady Monarchs basketball team has won three national championships. In 1979 and 1980, the Lady Monarchs were AIAW Champions. In 1985, they won the NCAA Division I National Championship after defeating the Georgia Lady Bulldogs 70–65. In addition, the Lady Monarchs won five Sun Belt conference championship titles (1983, 1984, 1985, 1987 and 1990) and 17 CAA championship titles (1992–2008).

=== Field hockey ===
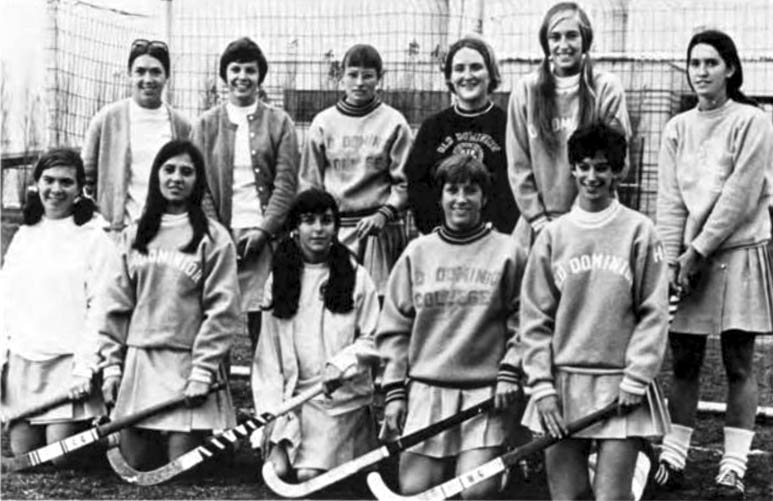
Old Dominion women's field hockey team of 1971

The ODU Monarchs field hockey team is second to the North Carolina Tar Heels for being the winningest NCAA college field hockey program with nine national titles. Overall, the team has won 17 regular season conference titles and 15 conference tournament titles with eight straight CAA regular season and tournament titles from 1996 to 2003. From 1990 to 1993, the Monarchs won 66 straight games including three national titles. As of 2013, 50 different Monarchs have been named All-Americans.

- National Championships – 1982–1984, 1988, 1990–1992, 1998, 2000
- Conference tournament Championships – CAA: 1991–1994, 1996–2003, 2005, 2009–2011
- Conference Championships – CAA: 1991–1993, 1996–2003, 2005–2007, 2011, 2012; Big East: 2013
- NCAA Tournaments – 1981–2003, 2005–2007, 2010–2013

=== Football ===
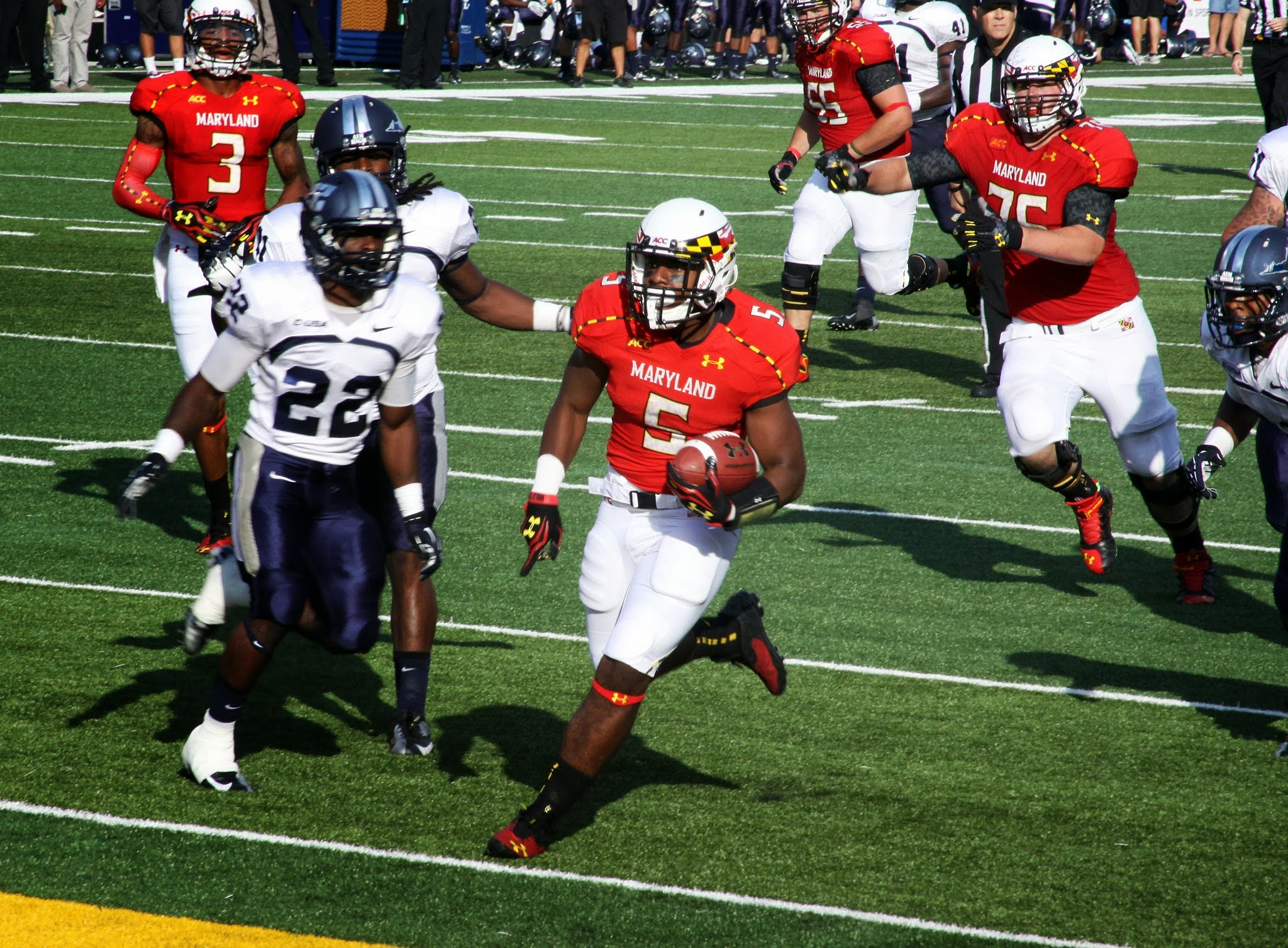
Old Dominion (in white) v Maryland game in 2013

The history of football at ODU began with the Norfolk Division, which had a football team until 1941 known as the Norfolk Division Braves. The program dissolved due to a rule against freshman players and a $10,000 debt.

On June 14, 2005, its Board of Visitors approved by a 14–0 vote the creation of an NCAA Division I team, which began play on September 5, 2009.

On February 9, 2007, ODU's Athletic Director Jim Jarrett announced that Bobby Wilder, the associate head football coach at the University of Maine, would be the head football coach at Old Dominion University. The team signed its first class in 2008. As is the case with many new football programs, all players on the 2008 Monarchs football team were redshirted, and when added with the 2009 signing class and transfers from I-A schools, formed the nucleus of the school's first football team. Initially, ODU competed as an FCS program (formerly I-AA), and was independent for two years before joining the Colonial Athletic Association for the 2011 season.

The final record for Old Dominion's 2009 football program was 9–2, at the time the best winning record ever for a first-year collegiate football program. This record is now held by Mercer University who finished 10–2 in 2013. Old Dominion's football program had continued success in 2010 finishing 8–3. In the following years, Old Dominion's football program finished their 2011–2012 season with a 10–3 record, and an 11–2 record for their 2012–2013 season which gained national attention. As the school's football program began to grow along with the university itself, Old Dominion's potential was realized by several commissioners for college football, particularly by Conference USA. Old Dominion officially joined Conference USA (C-USA) on July 1, 2013, leaving behind their former conference affiliation with the Colonial Athletic Association (CAA). They won their first C-USA game against Rice on September 20, 2014.

Foreman Field (now S.B. Ballard Stadium) was formerly the field hockey and women's lacrosse teams' home venue before renovating to accommodate the new football program in 2009. Field Hockey and women's lacrosse teams were relocated to L.R. Hill Sports Complex.

As of the 2015 season, Foreman Field at S.B. Ballard Stadium sold out 48 consecutive home games.

=== Rowing ===
The ODU Rowing Club (ODURC) has been under the Recreational Sports department since 1985. The club is fully student-run and is funded largely by the student members of the club. The men's rowing club won the ACRA national championship in May 2008. In 2008, rowing also became a varsity sport for female students, and a full-time coach was hired for the new women's team. Within their first year at varsity level, the women's team placed at a national competition. The decision to elevate only the women's team to varsity status was made to keep ODU compliant with Title IX regulations, providing balance to the increased spending on men's athletics that a football program brought.

== Conference affiliation ==
Current conference	Sports affiliated
Sun Belt Conference	Basketball (m+w); Baseball; Football; Golf (m+w); Soccer (m+w); Tennis (m+w); Volleyball (w)
American Athletic Conference	Lacrosse (w)
Atlantic Sun Conference	Swimming & Diving (m+w)
Big 12 Conference	Rowing (w)
Big East Conference	Field Hockey
MAISA	Sailing (m+w)

=== Post-CAA realignment history ===
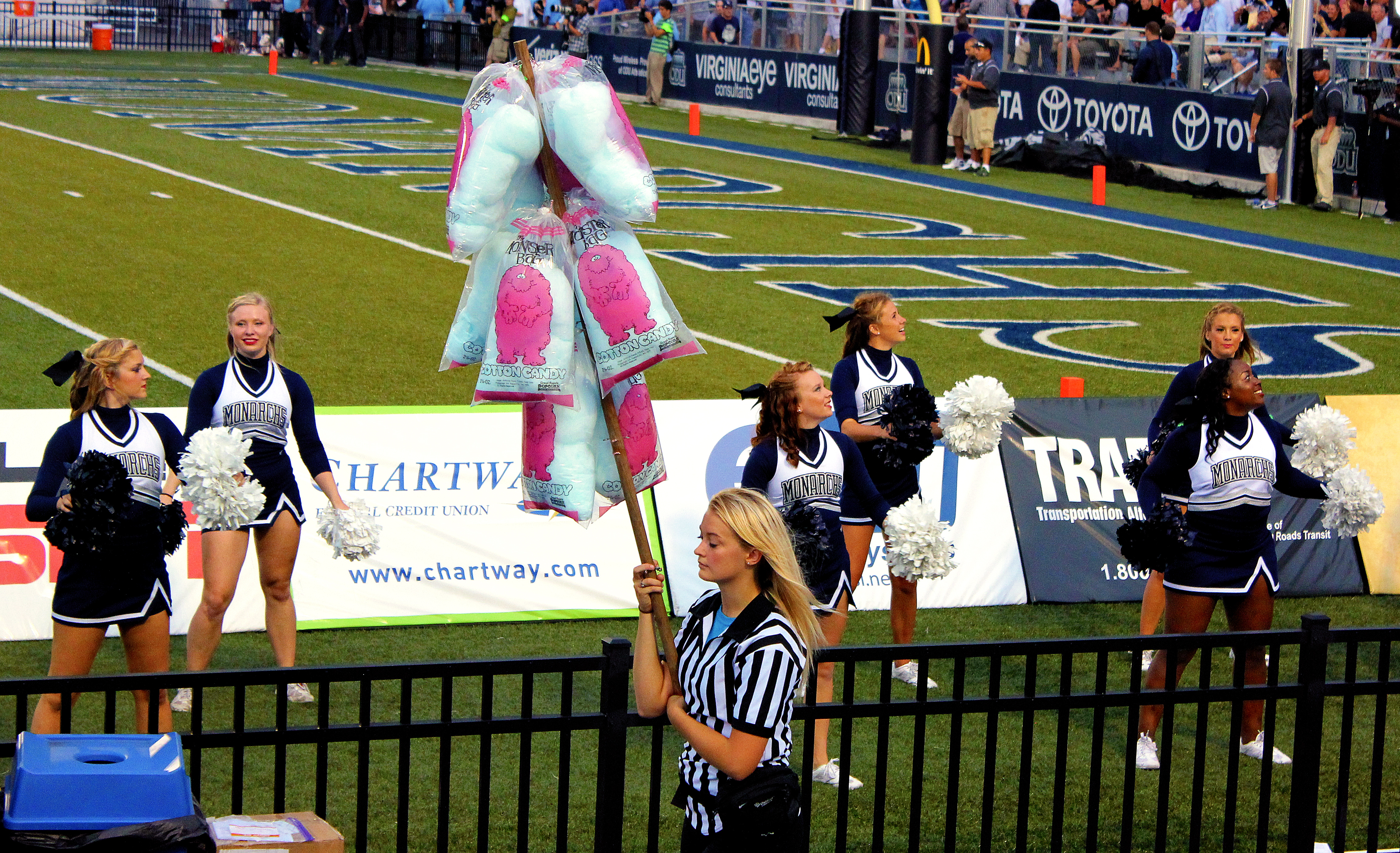
Game in 2013.

The football team played their 2013 season as an independent as part of the transition to FBS. Following, ODU competed as a full football-playing member of C-USA from 2014 to 2021-22 school year before joining the Sun Belt Conference in 2022.

Old Dominion's field hockey team competes in the Big East Conference. The field hockey program had previously announced that it would join the original Big East for the 2013–14 school year. However, following the split of the original Big East, the two successor conferences, the new Big East and the American Athletic Conference, agreed that The American would not sponsor field hockey and the new Big East would take in all of The American's programs in those sports as associate members. The women's lacrosse team spent their 2013–14 season as an independent before joining the Atlantic Sun Conference as an associate member effective July 1, 2014. Old Dominion women's lacrosse team joined the American Athletic Conference in 2020.

In 2014, the women's rowing team became an associate member of the Big 12 Conference, which effectively took over sponsorship of that sport from C-USA. Later, the university announced that the rowing team would change its conference affiliation and compete in the American Athletic Conference beginning in the 2018–19 school year.

Following the move to Conference USA, the men's swimming and diving team competed for two years as an independent, as C-USA did not sponsor the sport. On July 16, 2015, the team announced it would join the Coastal Collegiate Swimming Association, later renamed the Coastal Collegiate Sports Association, beginning with the 2015–16 season.

== Non-varsity sports ==
=== Cheerleading (co-ed) ===
Led by head coach Courtney Abston, the Old Dominion University cheer squad performs at all football home games and men and women's basketball home games. The ODU cheer team began competing at the NCA College Nationals in Daytona, FL in 2016. They placed first in the Division 1A Intermediate All-Girl Division in 2017.

== Sport Clubs ==
There are 17 active sport clubs at ODU, with the purpose to provide opportunities for students to play in non-varsity sports while developing skills in leadership, administration, organization, and fundraising.

Men's	Women's
Baseball	Softball
Rugby	Rubgy
Soccer	Soccer
Volleyball	Volleyball
Tennis	Tennis
Swim	Swim
Ultimate Frisbee	Ultimate Frisbee
Lacrosse	Lacrosse
Ice Hockey	Field Hockey
Golf	Golf
Running	Running

== Discontinued sports ==
=== Wrestling ===
Old Dominion Monarchs wrestling was established in 1957. The school's departure from the CAA forced the wrestling team to become an associate member of the Mid-American Conference, as Conference USA does not sponsor wrestling. It also was a catalyst that caused the CAA to stop sponsoring the sport. Practices took place at the Wrestling Facility and dual meets and tournaments were held at the Chartway Arena located on campus. Old Dominion's most recent head wrestling coach was Steve Martin, who served for ten seasons with the program.

Former Monarch wrestlers who went on to compete in mixed martial arts include Brandon Vera (formerly UFC) and Shanon Slack (Bellator).

On April 2, 2020, Old Dominion Athletics Director Camden Wood Selig announced that the wrestling program would be cut "immediately" based on the conclusion of a six-month study by outside consultant Richard Sander, staff member of East Tennessee State Athletics Department. According to the study, discontinuing varsity wrestling at Old Dominion would save the department $1 million and help offset recent budget cutbacks due to declining enrollment at the university.

==== Accomplishments ====
- 1994 ACC Champion
- 3 Individual NCAA Championship Titles: Carl Ragland (152 lbs) in 1969, Wayne Bright (142 1bs) in 1970, Terry Perdew (118 lbs) in 1974
- 21 NCAA All-Americans
- Coaches Association National Academic 1st team selections: James Nicholson 2009,10 & 11, Kyle Hutter 2009 & 2011, Ryan Williams 2008 & 2009, and Tristan Warner 2012.

=== Track & Field ===
Old Dominion Monarchs track & field has very limited history. Early in ODU's athletics, "April 1938: Cecil Griffin runs a 9.9 dash and Johnny Brown runs a 9.8 dash against Wake Forest for what is believed to have been fastest collegiate times that year."

Following World War II, on Sept. 1942 J.C "Scrap" Chander gets named the Athletic Director as well as Head Coach for multiple monarch teams such as baseball, basketball, track and field and swimming.

== Rivalries ==
=== James Madison ===
On October 26, the Old Dominion Monarchs and in-state rival James Madison Dukes announced the official beginning of the "Royal Rivalry". As the Virginia-based schools within the Sun Belt Conference, they will compete for an all-sports trophy that contains a football component and draws its name from the royal inspiration of both schools' mascots.

=== Norfolk State ===
Along with the Monarchs, the Norfolk State Spartans are the only NCAA Division I intercollegiate sports teams that are based in Norfolk, Virginia.

=== VCU ===
The VCU Rams are primarily ODU's rival in men's and women's basketball as both schools competed in the CAA and were once part of the College of William & Mary.

=== William & Mary ===
Old Dominion played as a division of the William & Mary Tribe before gaining independence in 1962. Following, both schools competed in the CAA.

== The Old Dominion Athletic Foundation ==
The Old Dominion Athletic Foundation (ODAF) is the official booster club for Old Dominion Athletics. the Old Dominion Athletic Foundation was previously known as the Big Blue Club, or The Old Dominion University Intercollegiate Foundation. The change from those to ODAF occurred March 1, 2011. The Old Dominion Athletic Foundation has a 501-C-3 designation as a non-profit organization.
