= Marshall Thundering Herd women's soccer =

Multi-college American soccer team

- Founded: 1998; 28 years ago
- University: Marshall University
- Head coach: Rafa Simoes (3rd season)
- Conference: Sun Belt
- Location: Huntington, West Virginia, US
- Stadium: Veterans Memorial Soccer Complex (capacity: 1,006)
- Nickname: Thundering Herd
- Colors: Kelly green and white
Home	Away

The Marshall Thundering Herd women's soccer team is a varsity intercollegiate athletic team of Marshall University in Huntington, West Virginia. The Thundering Herd plays its home games at Veterans Memorial Soccer Complex in Huntington and competes in the National Collegiate Athletic Association Division I Sun Belt Conference (SBC). Marshall fielded its first intercollegiate women's soccer team in 1998. The Herd are coached by Rafa Simoes, who has a record of 11-13-9 during his two previous seasons at Marshall.

== Players ==
=== Current roster ===
As of 9 May 2026

Note: Flags indicate national team as defined under FIFA eligibility rules; some limited exceptions apply. Players may hold more than one non-FIFA nationality.

No.	Pos.	Nation	Player
1	GK	FRA	Emma Durand
3	DF	POR	Maria Chaves
5	DF	BRA	Fernanda Dantas
8	MF	BRA	Luiza Travassos
9	FW	ENG	Tiggi Gent
10	FW	ESP	Nicole Navarro
11	FW	BRA	Geovanna Souza
13	DF	USA	Rylie McKinney
15	MF	FRA	Lou Brossault

No.	Pos.	Nation	Player
16	MF	BRA	Larissa Ozorio
19	MF	GER	Lea Misch
20	DF	ENG	Mackenzie Mackreth
24	MF	USA	Brooklyn McComas
25	DF	USA	Madison Townes
26	MF	BRA	Luana Gusmao
27	DF	ENG	Ruby Johnson
28	DF	ESP	Marta Garcia
32	GK	USA	Katie McCutcheon

== Individual achievements ==
=== Freshman All-Americans ===
- Amanda McMahon, 2000 Soccer Buzz Freshman All-American

=== All-Region Honors ===
- Morgan White, 2022 United Soccer Coaches All-Southeast third team
- Sydney Arnold, 2016 NSCAA All-Region second team, 2015 NSCAA All-Region second team
- Kelly Culicerto, 2015 NSCAA All-Region first team, 2014 NSCAA All-Region second team
- Jenna Dubs, 2015 NSCAA All-Region first team
- Erika Duncan, 2010 NSCAA All-Region second team
- Amanda McMahon, 2001 NSCAA All-Region first team, 2000 NSCAA All-Region second team, 2000 Soccer Buzz All-Great Lakes Region third team

=== Career goalscorers ===
Rank	Player	Years	Goals
1	Erika Duncan	2007-2010	23
2	Amanda McMahon	2000-2001	22
3	Bailey Fisher	2022-2025	19
3	Erin Simmons	2012-2015	19
5	Sydney Arnold	2013-2016	18
5	Lindsey Jayjack	1999-2002	18
7	Kassie Hollman	2004-2007	17
7	Marah Abu-Tayeh	2016-2019	17
9	[Kelly Culicerto	2012-2015	16
10	Kelly Posey	1999-2002	15
10	Molly Snead	2006-2009	15
10	Morgan White	2019-2022	15

== Former Herd players in the professional ranks ==
Active Professional Players
Player	Current team	Current league	Former team
Meg Jarvis	Bridgwater United W.F.C.	FA Women's National League	Bristol Rovers W.F.C.
Mia Eickmann	FC Schalke 04 (women)	Westfalenliga	n/a
Ami Komori	Kolbotn Fotball	Toppserien	n/a
Abi Hugh	Fort Lauderdale United FC	USL Super League	Apollon Ladies F.C.

Marshall Women's Soccer Players on National Teams (Seniors)
Player	National teams
Mariana Barreto	Venezuela women's national football team
Kat González	Dominican Republic women's national football team
Elodie Metho	Cameroon women's national football team

== See also ==
- Marshall Thundering Herd men's soccer
