= Louisiana–Monroe Warhawks women's soccer =

American college soccer team

ULM Warhawks women's soccer
- University: University of Louisiana at Monroe
- Head coach: Sean Fraser (1st season)
- Conference: Sun Belt
- Location: Monroe, Louisiana, US
- Stadium: Brown Stadium (capacity: 3,000)
- Nickname: Warhawks
- Colors: Maroon and gold
Home	Away

The ULM Warhawks women's soccer team is an intercollegiate soccer varsity team representing the University of Louisiana at Monroe. The Louisiana–Monroe Warhawks competes in Division I of the National Collegiate Athletic Association (NCAA) and in the Sun Belt Conference. Home matches are played at Brown Stadium on the ULM campus. The current head coach is Sean Fraser, who was named the head coach of the Warhawks on January 14, 2020. The Warhawks played their first season in 1999.

== History ==
Warhawks Women's Soccer's home field was Brown Stadium from 1999 to 2006. In 2006, a new facility was built, the ULM Soccer Complex.

In 2019, the team returned to Brown stadium following renovations.

== Coaches ==
=== Historic head coaches ===
#	Coach	Seas	Wins	L	T	W %	Conf. W	Conf. L	Conf. T	Conf. W %
5	Sean Fraser	2020–	5	13	0	.000	0	8	0	.000
4	Keyton Wheelock	2016–2019	13	52	7	.229	7	30	3	.213
3	Roberto Mazza	2012–2015	25	49	3	.344	5	32	0	.135
2	Stacy Lamb	2001–2011	76	129	20	.382	36	75	10	.339
1	Rena Richardson	1999–2000	10	29	1	.263	7	16	1	.313

== Seasons ==
Year	Coach	Overall	Conf.	Conf rec.	Postseason
1999	Rena Richardson	5–15–0	3–9–0		
2000	Rena Richardson	5–14–1	4–7–1		
2001	Stacy Lamb	9–10–2	7–5–0	0–1	
2002	Stacy Lamb	8–11–4	6–3–3	0–1	
2003	Stacy Lamb	9–11–2	6–5–1	1–1	
2004	Stacy Lamb	14–6–2	7–4–1	2–1	
2005	Stacy Lamb	9–9–2	2–3–2	0–1	
2006	Stacy Lamb	5–13–2	1–9–1		
2007	Stacy Lamb	8–11–1	4–6–1		
2008	Stacy Lamb	4–13–1	1–9–1		
2009	Stacy Lamb	3–14–2	2–9–0		
2010	Stacy Lamb	2–17–1	0–11–0		
2011	Stacy Lamb	5–14–1	0–11–0		
2012	Roberto Mazza	4–15–0	1–9–0		
2013	Roberto Mazza	6–12–1	1–8–0		
2014	Roberto Mazza	8–10–1	2–7–0		
2015	Roberto Mazza	7–12–1	1–8–0		
2016	Keyton Wheelock	7–9–3	4–4–2	0–1	
2017	Keyton Wheelock	3–13–2	3–6–1		
2018	Keyton Wheelock	0–17–0	0–10–0		
2019	Keyton Wheelock	3–13–2	0–10–0		
2020	Sean Fraser	5–13–0	0–8–0	0–1	

- Note: Louisiana–Monroe was in the Southland Conference in soccer from 1999 to 2005; Sun Belt Conference from 2006–present
