= Texas State Bobcats =

Intercollegiate sports teams of Texas State University

- University: Texas State University
- Nickname: Bobcats
- NCAA: Division I (FBS)
- Conference: Pac-12
- Athletic director: Don Coryell
- Location: San Marcos, Texas, United States
- Varsity teams: 14 (15 in 2027)
- Football stadium: UFCU Stadium
- Basketball arena: Strahan Arena
- Baseball stadium: Bobcat Ballpark
- Softball stadium: Bobcat Softball Stadium
- Soccer stadium: Bobcat Soccer Complex
- Colors: Maroon and gold
- Mascot: Boko the Bobcat
- Fight song: Go Bobcats!
- Website: txst.com
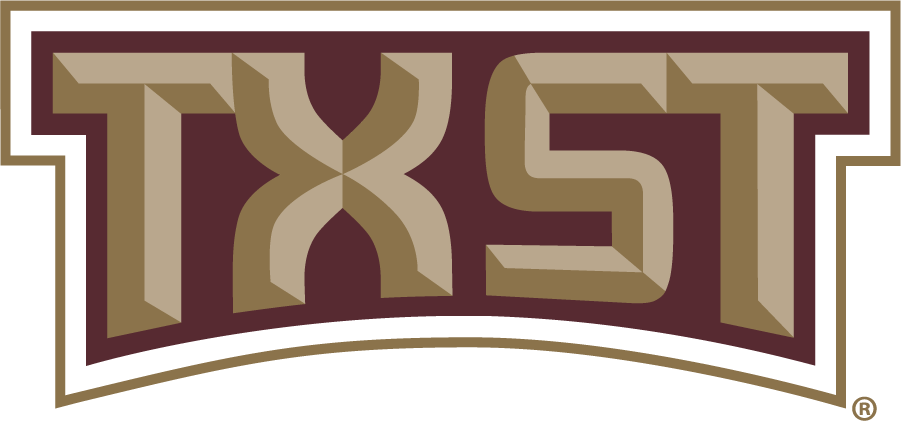

The Texas State Bobcats are the varsity sports teams that represent Texas State University (TXST), (Note: The university uses "TXST" as its abbreviation instead of "TSU" to avoid confusion with other institutions, among them fellow Texas institutions Tarleton State University and Texas Southern University. It also discourages the rendering of "TxST".) a public research university in San Marcos, Texas, United States. Currently, they compete in the Pac-12 Conference (Pac-12) in NCAA Division I (Football Bowl Subdivision for football). The Bobcat has been the mascot of Texas State University since 1921, when the university adopted the name from the recommendation of a committee formed to raise school spirit. Though considerably smaller than mountain lions, bobcats are known for their stubborn fierceness and great courage. The football squad used the bobcat for the first time in 1921 and went undefeated with a 7–0 season. Texas State had several officially recognized live bobcat mascots until the 1970s.

In 1964, the Texas State Bobcat was given the official name of "Boko" by Beth Greenlees, a sophomore from Luling, Texas, who beat out about 100 other students in a "Name the Bobcat" contest. Her winning submission earned her a $5 prize and the honor of being the person who named the Texas State mascot. Boko has twice been named “USA National Champion” mascot. Texas State had no official fight song until 1961, when Paul Yoder was commissioned to compose "Go Bobcats." The song is the rousing "call to arms" for all Texas State athletic games and competition.

Dr. Larry Teis stepped down as athletic director of Texas State Athletics on August 31, 2021, with Mr. Don Coryell, Executive Senior Associate Athletic Director of External Operations, assuming the role of interim Athletic Director beginning September 1, 2021.

Texas State joined the Sun Belt Conference on July 1, 2013. On June 30th, 2025, Texas State announced that it will be joining the Pac-12 Conference on July 1, 2026.

== Sports sponsored ==
Men's sports	Women's sports
Baseball	Basketball
Basketball	Cross country
Cross country	Golf
Football	Gymnastics (2027–28)
Golf	Soccer
Track and field^{1}	Softball
	Tennis
	Track & field^{1}
	Volleyball
^{1} – Track and field includes both indoor and outdoor

=== Baseball ===
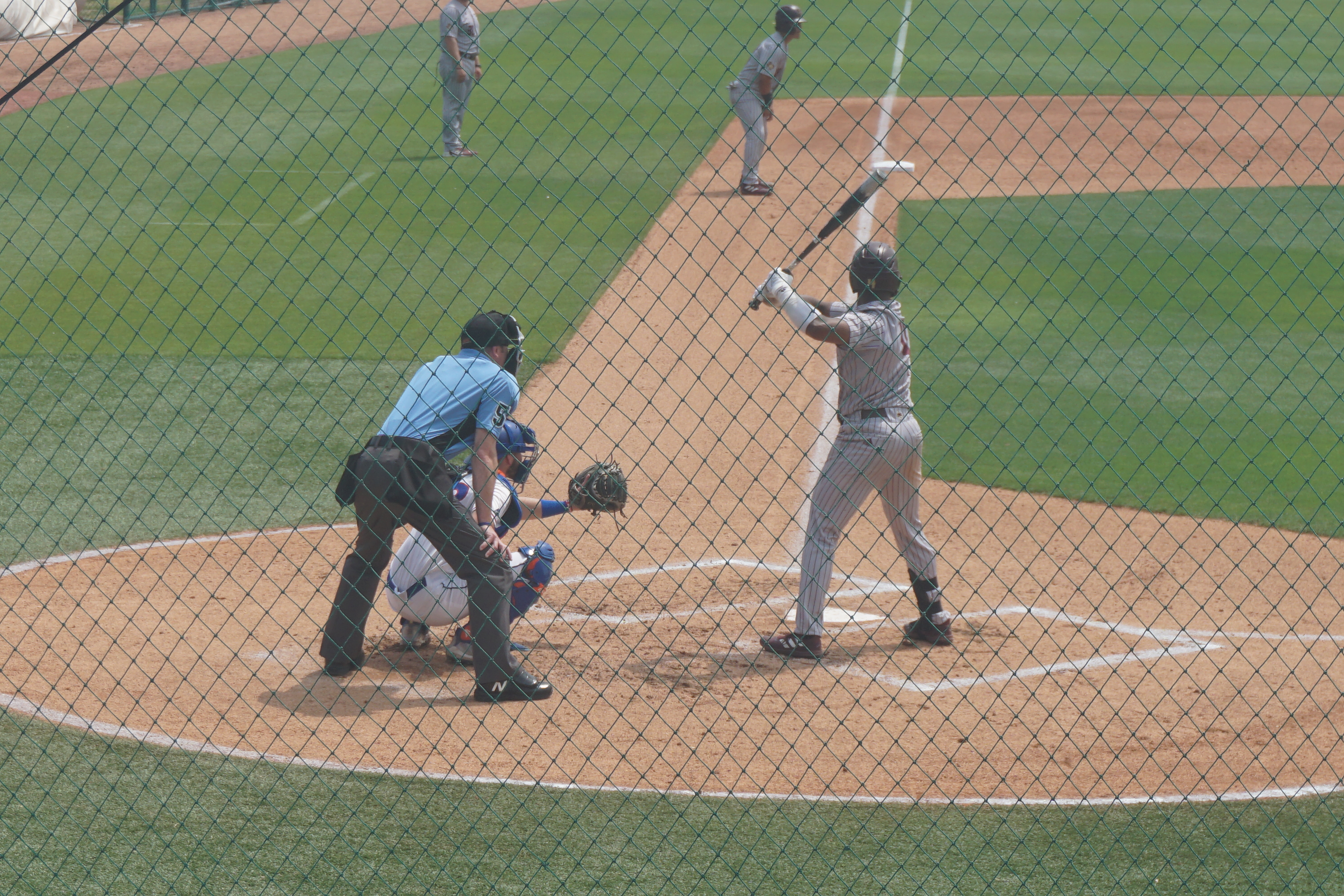
Texas State v Arlington game in 2022

Texas State baseball claimed its fourth Southland Conference tournament championship in 2011, tying the SLC record for tournament championships. The Bobcats also won their third regular season championship in 2011, only the eighth time in SLC history that a school swept regular season and tournament championships. The 2011 championship was also the third consecutive regular season first-place finish for the team. The Bobcats have gone 901-702-3 on the diamond since 1985, a win percentage of .561.

The Bobcat Baseball and Softball stadiums underwent renovations prior to the 2009 seasons, which included the addition of 12-person capacity luxury suites. The facilities hold 2,000 for baseball and 1,000 for softball.

Bobcat Ballpark had its inaugural game on March 2, 2009, against the Texas Longhorns.

=== Basketball ===
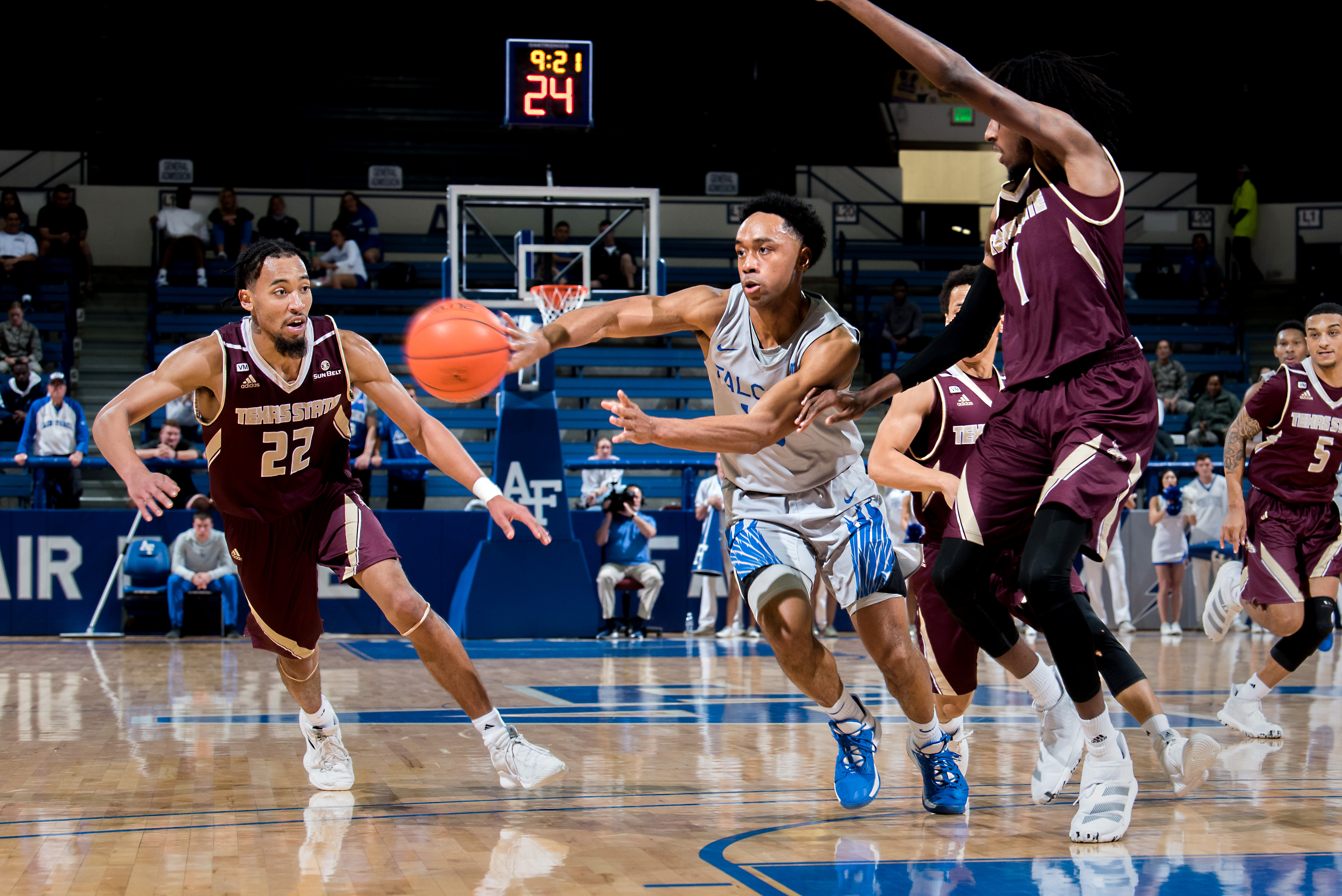
Texas State v Air Force men's basketball game in 2019

The men's basketball program has claimed 11 regular season conference titles since 1950, nine Lone Star Conference and two during their tenure in the Southland Conference. The Bobcats have won their conference's postseason tournament four times, twice in the LSC and twice in the SLC. The program also won the NAIA national championship in 1960. Since the 1984–85 season, the Bobcats have assembled a win percentage of .444 with an overall record of 355–444.

The women's basketball team has won the Southland Conference postseason tournament twice, last time coming in the 2002–2003 season. The program has posted a 660–622 record since 1966, a win percentage of .515.

Both basketball programs play in Strahan Arena, opened in 1982. The arena, which holds 7,200 spectators, had a new playing floor installed before the 2008–2009 season.

=== Football ===
The football team has won two Southland Conference championships in 2005 and 2008, advancing to the NCAA semi-finals in 2005. Before that, the school won two Division II national championships in 1981 and 1982. Additionally, the Bobcats won the Texas Intercollegiate Athletic Association Championship in 1921, 1926, and 1929 along with eight Lone Star Conference titles between 1948 and 1983. The team has been competing intermittently since 1904 and has a record of 489-404-28, a .546 winning percentage.

Bobcat Stadium, where the team has played its home games since 1981, completed a massive expansion project in 2012. With the completion of the north end zone complex, the facility currently seats 30,000.

=== Golf ===
The men's golf team won the Division II NCAA national championship in 1983 and has won six conference championships (three Lone Star Conference and three Southland Conference) with the last coming in 1997. The women's team has won two Southland championships, most recently in the 2009–10 season, and one in the Sun Belt Conference in 2016.

=== Soccer ===
The Bobcat women's soccer program has won five regular season conference championships and five postseason conference tournaments, most recently in 2018 and 2011 respectively. The program is 214-172-34 since its inception in 1999, a winning percentage of .550 and all under the direction of head coach Kat Conner. Home games are played at the Bobcat Soccer Complex, built in 2000 with a capacity of 1,000.

=== Softball ===
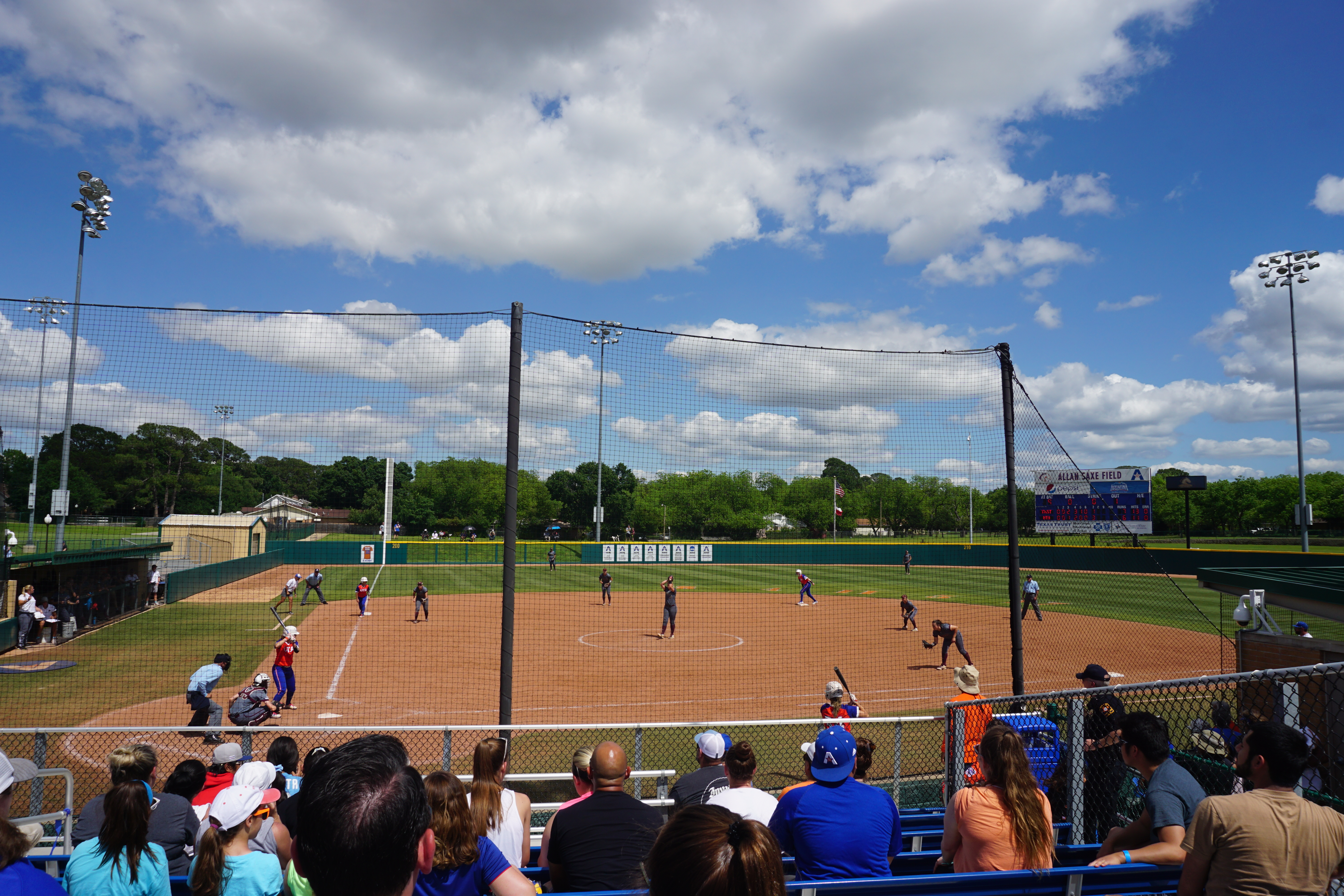
The Bobcats in action against UT Arlington in 2019

The Bobcat softball program won the regular season SLC championship five times, the conference's postseason tournament four times, and one Sun Belt Conference regular season championship in 2018. The team took home the regular season and conference tournament crowns in 2009 and shared the regular season title in 2010. They moved to the Western Athletic Conference for 2013 and the Sun Belt Conference in 2014. The Bobcats have nine NCAA appearances (1999, 2001, 2003, 2009, 2012, 2016, 2017, 2018, 2021). The program is 1,016-979-3 (1985–2021), a .509 winning percentage. Texas State's head coach, Ricci Woodard (2001–Present), is the longest serving Texas State softball coach, leading the Bobcats through 26 seasons. Coach Woodard has garnered a record of 917–543–2 (.628).

Assisting Woodard for six seasons (2015–2020) was Cat Osterman, a four-time collegiate All-American at the University of Texas and two-time Olympic medalist. Osterman's coaching experience includes a three-year stint as the head coach at Division II St. Edward's University from 2012 to 2014 and another three-year stay as an assistant at DePaul University from 2008 to 2010. Osterman also served as a student assistant at the University of Texas for the 2007 season.

=== Tennis ===
The women's tennis program has won four conference titles (two Lone Star Conference, two Southland Conference), last winning in 1989. The team plays home matches at the Bobcat Tennis Complex, which has a grandstand with a seating capacity of 200.

=== Track & field ===
The Bobcat men's track & field teams, indoor and outdoor, have won 17 conference championships (three Lone Star Conference, one Gulf Star Conference, 10 Southland Conference, 1 Western Athletic Conference and two Sun Belt Conference championships), last winning in 2019 (outdoor). The program has placed an athlete on the Division I All-American Team 29 times, claimed five Division I medals, and has two Olympians, Charles Austin, who has participated in the Olympics three times winning one gold medal and pole vaulter Logan Cunningham who participated in 2016.

The Bobcat women's track & field teams, indoor and outdoor, have won 18 conference championships (one Gulf Star Conference and 10 Southland Conference, 2 Western Athletic Conference, five Sun Belt Conference), last coming in 2019 (indoor). Members of the team have placed on the All-American Team 15 times. The program boasts three Olympians who have competed a combined five times, Brigette Foster who placed in the semi-finals in 2004, Liudmila Litvinova who won the silver medal in the 2008 games and Anicka Newell who participated in the 2016 games.

=== Volleyball ===
The Bobcats volleyball program has won nine regular season conference championships (one Gulf Star Conference, six Southland Conference, and two Sun Belt Conference), last coming in 2019. The team has taken home ten postseason conference tournament titles (one in the Gulf Star Conference, seven in the Southland Conference, and four in the Sun Belt Conference), with the most recent tournament win in 2020. The team has gone 1085-665-19, a winning percentage of .619, since 1965. The team plays home games at Strahan Coliseum.

== National championships ==
=== Team ===
Sport	Association	Division	Year	Runner-up	Score
Men's Tennis (2)	NAIA (2)	Single (2)	1981	Redlands	36–31
Men's Tennis (2)	NAIA (2)	Single (2)	1982	Redlands	36–24

== Notable non-varsity sports ==
=== Rugby ===
Founded in 1983, the Texas State Rugby Football Club plays college rugby in the Division I-AA Southwest Conference (SWC) against local rivals such as the University of Texas and go by the Texas State Renegades. Texas State has been led by Coach Scott Courtney and James Summers since 1999. Texas State won the Texas state championship in 2009. Gregg Goodman ('87) played for the U.S. national rugby team.

=== Lacrosse ===
The Texas State Lacrosse team plays in the Lone Star Alliance conference, which is affiliated with the Men's Collegiate Lacrosse Association (MCLA). The team plays regular season home games at the West Athletic Fields/Bobcat Soccer Complex.

== Culture ==
=== Nickname ===
A bobcat will fight you with everything he has: with four claws, teeth, speed and brains.

— Oscar Strahan, former athletic director and head football coach

The bobcat is indigenous to Central Texas, where Texas State University is located. Oscar Strahan, a former athletic director and football coach for the school, was quoted as saying, "A bobcat will fight you with everything he has: with four claws, teeth, speed and brains." The colors, maroon and gold, come from the Gaillardia flower, which is native to the region.

=== Rivalries ===
Their main Sun Belt rival was the UT Arlington Mavericks until 2022.

==== I-35 Orange vs. Maroon Rivalry ====
The I-35 Orange vs. Maroon Rivalry series is the name given to the athletic competitions between the Bobcats and the University of Texas at San Antonio Roadrunners. The name is derived from the Interstate highway that essentially links the two schools who are in relatively close proximity to each other. In the beginning of the rivalry, a trophy was awarded to the winner of the men's basketball game. It has grown, however, to include all common sports the two schools compete with each other in throughout the academic year. A point system is used to crown a winner after the last competition between the schools in that year. The trophy is then inscribed with the annual winners and the winning institution retains the trophy for one year until the next winner is crowned.

==== The Battle for the Paddle ====
In fall 1998, just before the Bobcats were scheduled to take on the Nicholls State Colonels, rains flooded San Marcos and the field at Bobcat Stadium.

Athletic directors and coaches from each school decided not to continue with the game and coined the annual contest named "Battle for the Paddle," joking that fans and athletes needed to use a boat and paddle to get to the game. The game eventually took place on November 28, 1998, with the Bobcats prevailing 28–27 to win the Paddle.

The Colonels re-took the paddle in 2010, eventually winning 47–45 in 4 OT. 2010 was Texas State's last year playing football in the Southland Conference. In 2011, they were an FCS Independent and in their first year of transitioning to the FBS. Since Texas State was playing with more scholarship players, Nicholls State opted not to bring the paddle to San Marcos for the final scheduled matchup between the schools. The Texas State team created their own paddle and won the game, 38–12. The Colonels retained possession of the actual paddle trophy.

==== Bobcats vs Bearkats ====
The rivalry between the Sam Houston Bearkats and Texas State Bobcats has no longer been annual since Texas State left the Southland Conference (SLC) and moved to FBS. As of 2011, the Bearkats and Bobcats had played each other 89 times, making it the most played FCS rivalry game in Texas. Even after Sam Houston moved to FBS in 2023, the rivalry has not been regular, given that Sam Houston has been a member of Conference USA since moving to FBS while TXST has been in the Sun Belt Conference and now the Pac-12. The teams' 2024 meeting was their first since TXST left the SLC.
