= Georgia Southern Eagles =

Sports program at Georgia Southern University

- University: Georgia Southern University
- Nickname: Eagles
- NCAA: Division I (FBS)
- Conference: Sun Belt (primary); CCSA (women's swimming & diving); Southern (rifle)
- Athletic director: Chris Davis
- Location: Statesboro, Georgia
- Varsity teams: 17
- Football stadium: Paulson Stadium
- Basketball arena: Hill Convocation Center
- Baseball stadium: J. I. Clements Stadium
- Softball stadium: Eagle Field at GS Softball Complex
- Soccer stadium: Eagle Field
- Volleyball arena: Hanner Fieldhouse
- Colors: Blue and white
- Mascot: Freedom II (live); GUS (costume)
- Fight song: Georgia Southern Fight Song
- Website: gseagles.com

The Georgia Southern Eagles are the athletic team(s) of Georgia Southern University (GS). The Eagles compete in the Division I Football Bowl Subdivision (FBS) (formerly I-A) and are members of the NCAA Division I Sun Belt Conference. Prior to joining the Sun Belt Conference in 2014, the Eagles were members of the Trans America Athletic Conference (presently known as the ASUN Conference) and the Southern Conference (SoCon). During their time at the Football Championship Subdivision (FCS/I-AA) level, the Eagles have won six national championships.

The only Georgia Southern teams which compete outside the Sun Belt do so in sports that are not sponsored by that conference. Women's swimming & diving competes in the Coastal Collegiate Sports Association. Rifle, a fully co-educational sport in which GS fields a women-only team, competes in the SoCon. Men's soccer will compete in the Mid-American Conference starting in the fall 2021 season, following the demise of the Sun Belt men's soccer league.

== Sports sponsored ==
Men's sports	Women's sports
Baseball	Basketball
Basketball	Cross country
Football	Golf
Golf	Rifle
Soccer	Soccer
Tennis	Softball
	Swimming and diving
	Tennis
	Track & field^{1}
	Volleyball
^{1} – includes both indoor and outdoor

=== Baseball ===
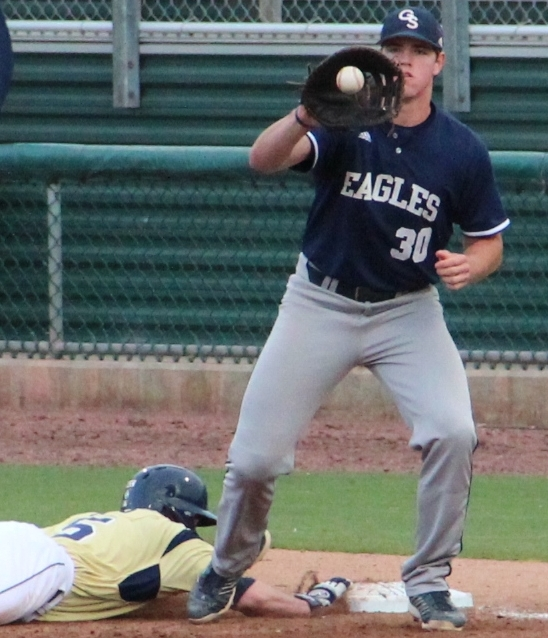
An Eagles baseball player fields a pickoff throw during a 2014 game

The baseball team is led by head coach Rodney Hennon, who is in his seventeenth year at Georgia Southern. Georgia Southern played its first year of baseball in 1933. The team went to the College World Series in 1973 and 1990 and has appeared in 11 NCAA regionals. The team was also crowned the National Association of Intercollegiate Athletics National Champions in 1962, sweeping Portland State.

The team won the 2009 Southern Conference baseball tournament with a 7 to 3 victory over top seeded Elon and clinch its first SoCon title since 2002. They also won the 2011 SoCon Tournament after Chris Beck pitched a complete-game shutout against Samford University. They lost two games against future national champion South Carolina, losing a 2–1 decision, and NC State, coming short by three runs in a 5–2 game.

=== Men's basketball ===
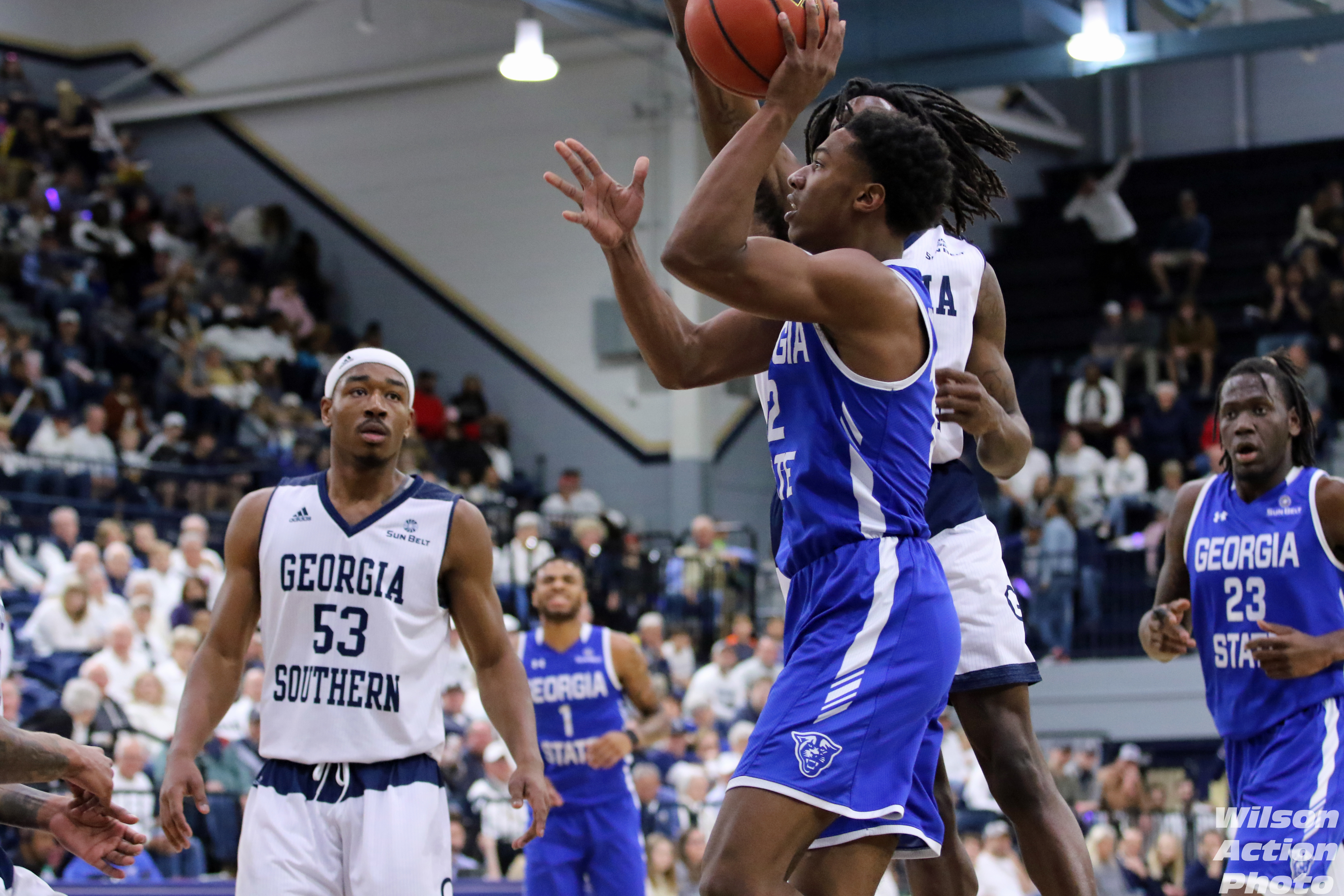
Georgia Southern (in white) vs Georgia State in 2020

The head coach of the Georgia Southern men's basketball squad is Charlie Henry. Introduced on March 29, 2023, Henry is the 15th head coach in program history. The team participated in the NCAA Division I Tournament in 1983, 1987 and 1992, and the NIT in 1988, 1989 and 2006. The first year of men's basketball at Georgia Southern was 1926, and the first year the school played in Division I was 1971.

Georgia Southern basketball player Roger Moore was the first African-American athlete to receive a scholarship in the University System of Georgia.

=== Football ===
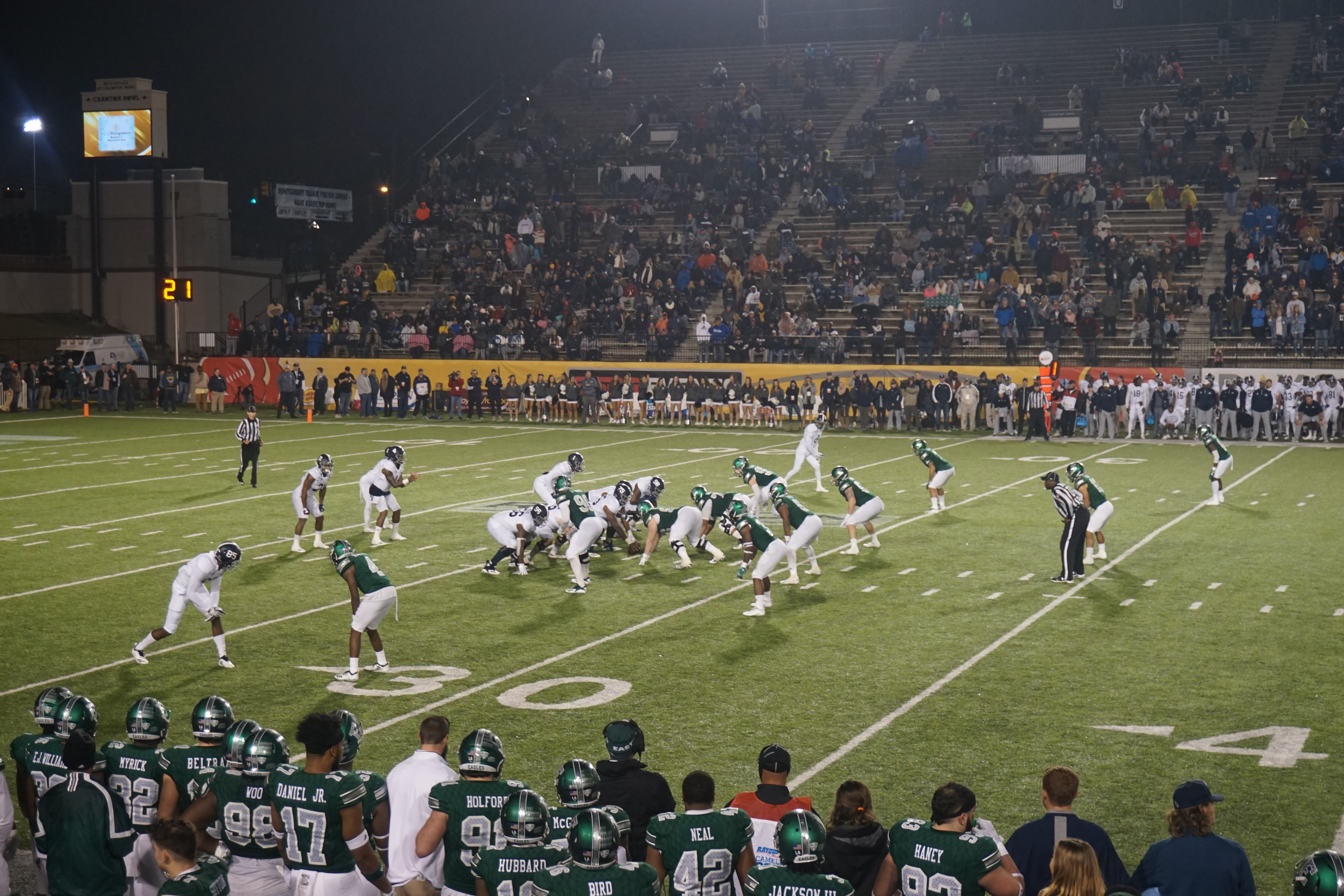
Georgia Southern (in white) on offense at the 2018 Camellia Bowl

The head coach of the Eagles is Clay Helton. The Eagles have won six NCAA FCS (I-AA) National Championships (1985, 1986, 1989, 1990, 1999, and 2000). In addition, the Eagles have won ten Southern Conference championships (1993, 1997, 1998, 1999, 2000, 2001, 2002, 2004, 2011, and 2012) and one Sun Belt Conference championship (2014); with the Eagles' first Sun Belt title, they became only the third team, after Nevada in 1992 and Marshall in 1997, to win their conference championship in their first year at the FBS level. Home football games are played at Allen E. Paulson Stadium, known as "The Prettiest Little Stadium in America." Georgia Southern fielded its first football team in 1910; however, the sport was suspended for World War II and was not restarted until 1982.

==== Erk Russell ====
In 1981, former University of Georgia Defensive Coordinator Erk Russell was hired to restart the football program at Georgia Southern College (as the university was called at the time), a program that had not competed in forty years. Erk Russell became America's winningest coach, leading to the Eagles to three national championships. The Eagles extended Division I's longest home win streak from 26 to 37 games, gaining distinction as the only 15–0 college team of the twentieth century. Russell's final record at Georgia Southern, after his retirement in 1989, was 83–22–1 (.788).

Erk Russell addressed the team the night before his shocking and sudden death on September 8, 2006. Georgia Southern University and thousands of friends, family, and fans gathered at Paulson Stadium to mourn the passing of Erk Russell, one of America's most exciting and successful college football coaches.

Since Russell's departure, football has continued to be prominent at Georgia Southern. Head coach Tim Stowers succeeded Russell and won the 1990 national title, while Paul Johnson added two more in 1999 and 2000 with teams led by all-time Division I rushing leader Adrian Peterson.

==== Beautiful Eagle Creek ====
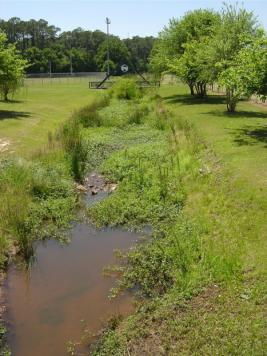
Beautiful Eagle Creek

In the early 1980s, a drainage ditch that the team had to cross several times a day during football practice came to be called Beautiful Eagle Creek by popular Head Football Coach Erk Russell. When the Eagles traveled to Northern Iowa during the 1985 playoffs, Coach Russell brought along a jug of Eagle Creek water to sprinkle on the field. The Eagles were victorious and went on to win many national championships with the help of that magical water. Today, the jug is on display at Georgia Southern University and signs have been erected along the creek.

==== The Hugo Bowl ====
In 1989, ESPN was to broadcast a Thursday Night Football game between the Georgia Southern Eagles and the Middle Tennessee State Blue Raiders. However, Hugo, a category 4 hurricane, was headed straight towards the coast of Georgia. At the time of landfall, Hugo ranked as the eleventh most intense hurricane to strike U.S. this century, and it delivered the highest ever recorded storm surge on the East Coast. Nevertheless, the decision was made to continue with the game. For safety purposes, an open line was kept between the press box at Paulson Stadium and the National Hurricane Center in Florida. The Eagles went on to defeat MTSU by a score of 26–0 in a game known as the Hugo Bowl.

== Traditions ==
=== Nickname ===
Sun Belt Conference logo in Georgia Southern's colors

Eagles is the third nickname of Georgia Southern University. From 1924 to 1941, the nickname was the Blue Tide. After World War II, athletic teams were referred to as the Professors, as the school was a teachers college. However, in 1959, when the school was renamed Georgia Southern College, a student vote was held to determine the new mascot. Eagles was chosen over Colonels by a narrow margin.

=== Plain uniforms ===
When the football program was revived in 1982, the school did not have a large budget and coach Erk Russell ordered solid blue helmets and asked the players to put a white strip of tape down the middle. The uniforms consisted of plain white pants and blue jerseys without names. With the subsequent success of the Eagles, the basic simple design of the uniforms has remained the same.

== Notable alumni ==
Name	Class year	Notability	Reference(s)
NaJee Thompson	2023	NFL Cornerback - Minnesota Vikings	
Steven Fisk	2019	PGA Tour - [[ 2025 Sanderson Farms Champion Korn Ferry Tour - 2024 Club Car Championship Champion	
Darrell Baker Jr.	2022	NFL Cornerback - Indianapolis Colts	
Tyler Bass	2020	NFL Kicker - Buffalo Bills	
Kindle Vildor	2020	NFL Cornerback - Detroit Lions	
Matt Breida	2017	NFL Running Back - New York Giants	
Younghoe Koo	2016	NFL Kicker - Atlanta Falcons	
Jerick McKinnon	2014	NFL Running Back - Minnesota Vikings (Third Round Draft Pick in 2014)	
J.J. Wilcox	2013	NFL Safety - Dallas Cowboys (Second Round Draft Pick in 2013)	
Darius Eubanks	2013	NFL Linebacker - Cleveland Browns	
Laron Scott	2012	NFL Defensive Back - New York Giants	
Victor Roache	2012	MLB Outfielder, NCAA Homerun Derby Participant, Led NCAA Div.I Baseball in HR	
Adrian N. Peterson	2002	Former NFL Running Back - Chicago Bears	
Rob Bironas	2001	Former NFL Kicker, set record for most field goals in a game in 2007 (8)	
Kiwaukee Thomas	2000	Former NFL Player	
Earthwind Moreland	2000	Former NFL Player	
Todd Greene	1993	Former MLB Catcher	
Joey Hamilton	1991	Former MLB Pitcher	
Michael Curry	1990	Former NBA player, Former Head Coach of the Detroit Pistons, and president of the NBA Players Association	
Jeff Sanders	1989	Former NBA player, first round draft pick of the Chicago Bulls (20th pick overall)	
Fred Stokes	1987	Former NFL Player, started in Super Bowl XXVI	
Tracy Ham	1986	member of the College Football Hall of Fame, 1995 CFL Most Outstanding Player	
Ken Szotkiewicz	1968	Former MLB Shortstop - Detroit Tigers	
