= 2016 Sun Belt Conference men's soccer season =

- League: NCAA Division I
- Sport: Soccer
- Duration: August, 2016 – November, 2016
- Teams: 6

Regular season
- Season champions: Coastal Carolina
- Runners-up: Georgia Southern

Tournament
- Champions: Coastal Carolina
- Runners-up: Georgia State

Sun Belt Conference men's soccer seasons
- ← 2015 2017 →

2016 Sun Belt Conference men's soccer standings
	Conf.					Overall
Team	W		L		T	W		L		T
Coastal Carolina ‡	3	–	1	–	1	10	–	7	–	3
Georgia Southern	3	–	1	–	1	8	–	8	–	3
Georgia State	3	–	2	–	0	15	–	7	–	0
Hartwick	2	–	2	–	1	9	–	6	–	4
Appalachian State	1	–	3	–	1	5	–	9	–	4
Howard	1	–	4	–	0	2	–	14	–	3
‡-Tournament Champion +-Invited to the 2016 NCAA Division I Men's Soccer Championship; As of 21 November 2016; Rankings from NSCAA

The 2016 Sun Belt Conference men's soccer season was the 15th season of men's varsity soccer in the conference.

The Hartwick Hawks are both the defending regular season and conference tournament champions.

== Changes from 2015 ==
- The Coastal Carolina Chanticleers are joining the conference after previously being part of the Big South Conference.
- The NJIT Highlanders, an associate member, are moving to the Atlantic Sun Conference.

== Teams ==
=== Stadiums and locations ===
Team	Location	Stadium	Capacity
Appalachian State Mountaineers	Boone, North Carolina	ASU Soccer Stadium	2,000
Coastal Carolina Chanticleers	Conway, South Carolina	CCU Soccer Field	1,000
Georgia Southern Eagles	Statesboro, Georgia	Erk Russell Athletic Park	500
Georgia State Panthers	Atlanta, Georgia	GSU Soccer Complex	1,892
Hartwick Hawks	Oneonta, New York	Elmore Field	3,000
Howard Bison	Washington, D.C.	Greene Stadium	7,086

- Arkansas State, Arkansas–Little Rock, Louisiana–Lafayette, Louisiana–Monroe, South Alabama, Texas State, UTA and Troy do not sponsor men's soccer. Hartwick and Howard are associated members.

== Regular season ==
=== Results ===
Team/opponent	ASU	CCU	GSU	GSO	HAR	HOW
Appalachian State Mountaineers		1–2	0–1			2–0
Coastal Carolina Chanticleers			2–1	0–0		2–0
Georgia State Panthers				1–3	4–0	
Georgia Southern Eagles	3–1				2–1	
Hartwick Hawks	1–0	1–0				3–0
Howard Bison			1–3	2–0		

=== Rankings ===
Legend
Increase in ranking
Decrease in ranking
Not ranked previous week

		Pre	Wk 1	Wk 2	Wk 3	Wk 4	Wk 5	Wk 6	Wk 7	Wk 8	Wk 9	Wk 10	Wk 11	Wk 12	Final
Appalachian State	C														
Coastal Carolina	C	21	RV	NR											
Georgia State	C														
Georgia Southern	C														
Hartwick	C														
Howard	C														

== Postseason ==
=== Sun Belt Tournament ===
First round November 10
4	Hartwick	2
5	App State	1
3	Georgia State	2
6	Howard	0

Semifinals; November 11
1	Coastal Carolina	2
4	Hartwick	0
2	Georgia Southern	0
3	Georgia State	2

Championship; November 13
1	Coastal Carolina	1
3	Georgia State	0

=== NCAA tournament ===
Seed	Region	School	1st round	2nd round	3rd round	Quarterfinals	Semifinals	Championship
—	4	Coastal Carolina	W, 2–1 vs. Radford – (Conway)	L, 0–2 vs. Wake Forest – (Winston-Salem)				

== All-Sun Belt awards and teams ==
2016 Sun Belt Men's Soccer Individual Awards
Award	Recipient(s)
Player of the Year	Hannes Burmeister, Georgia State
Offensive Player of the Year	Hannes Burmeister, Georgia State
Defensive Player of the Year	Emil Laursen, Georgia Southern
Newcomer of the Year	Nick Hague, Georgia State
Freshman of the Year	Kyle Clinton, Georgia State; Hamish Ritchie, Hartwick
Coach of the Year	John Murphy, Georgia Southern

2016 Sun Belt Men's Soccer All-Conference Teams
First Team	Second Team
Stephen Chapman, Sr., FW, ASU; Frantzdy Pierrot, Jr., FW, CCU; Blake Wilson, Jr., FW, GSOU; Hannes Burmeister, So., MF, GSTA; Max Hemmings, So., MF, GSTA; Johnny McBeth, Jr., MF, HART; Einar Einarsson, Sr., DF, CCU; Emil Laursen, So., DF, GSOU; Kyle Clinton, Fr., DF, GSOU; Elliott Bentley, Fr., DF, HART; Yannic Horn, Jr., GK, GSTA	Martin Melchor, Jr., FW, CCU; Frank Rosenwald, Fr., FW, GSTA; Mike Rood, Sr., FW, HART; Sander Wang, Fr., MF, GSOU; Nick Wells, Jr., MF, GSOU; Jack Donaldson, Sr., MF, HART; Hamish Ritchie, Fr., MF, HART; Elis Bjornsson, Sr., DF, CCU; Ryan Reid, Sr., DF, CCU; Liam Fitzsimmons, Jr., DF, GSTA; Braulio Linares-Ortiz, Jr., GK, CCU

Key

- ASU = Applachain State
- CCU = Coastal Carolina
- GSTA = Georgia State
- GSOU = Georgia Southern
- HART = Hartwick
- HOW = Howard
- Fr. = Freshman
- So. = Sophomore
- Jr. = Junior
- Sr. = Senior
- Gr. = Graduate
- GK = Goalkeeper
- DF = Defender
- MF = Midfielder
- FW = Forward

== See also ==
- 2016 NCAA Division I men's soccer season
- 2016 Sun Belt Conference Men's Soccer Tournament
- 2016 Sun Belt Conference women's soccer season
