= 2019 Sun Belt Conference men's soccer season =

- League: NCAA Division I
- Sport: Soccer
- Duration: August 30, 2019 – November 6, 2019
- Teams: 6

2020 MLS SuperDraft

Regular season
- Season champions: Central Arkansas
- Runners-up: Coastal Carolina
- Season MVP: Offensive: Defensive: Goalkeeper:

Tournament
- Champions: Coastal Carolina
- Runners-up: Georgia State

Sun Belt Conference men's soccer seasons
- ← 2018 2020 →

2019 Sun Belt Conference men's soccer standings
	Conf.					Overall
Team	W		L		T	W		L		T
Central Arkansas	4	–	1	–	0	10	–	7	–	1
Coastal Carolina ‡	3	–	2	–	0	10	–	8	–	3
Appalachian State	2	–	3	–	0	11	–	7	–	1
Georgia State	2	–	3	–	0	12	–	4	–	4
Georgia Southern	2	–	3	–	0	7	–	9	–	2
Howard	2	–	3	–	0	5	–	12	–	1
‡ – Sun Belt Tournament Champion + – Invited to the 2019 NCAA tournament; As of 29 November 2019; Rankings from United Soccer Coaches

The 2019 Sun Belt Conference men's soccer season was the 18th season of men's varsity soccer in the conference. The season began in late August 2019 and concluded in mid-November 2019.

== Background ==
The 2018 regular season began in August 2018 and concluded in November 2018. The regular season champions, Georgia State, also won the 2018 Sun Belt Conference Men's Soccer Tournament and earned the conference's automatic berth into the 2018 NCAA Division I Men's Soccer Tournament. It was Georgia State's first berth into the NCAA tournament since 2011. There, Georgia State were eliminated in the first round in a penalty shoot-out by Charlotte.

== Head coaches ==
As of the 2018 season

Team	Head coach	Previous job	Years at school	Overall record	Record at school	Sun Belt record	NCAA Tournaments	NCAA College Cups	NCAA Titles	Ref.
Appalachian State	Jason O'Keefe	North Carolina (asst.)	4	18–23–13 (.454)	18–23–13 (.454)	3–7–4 (.357)	0	0	0	
Central Arkansas	Ross Duncan	Vermont (asst.)	9	33–66–9 (.347)	33–66–9 (.347)	13–25–6 (.364)	2	0	0	
Coastal Carolina	Shaun Docking	Charleston Southern	22	296–144–37 (.659)	276–125–35 (.673)	9–4–1 (.679)	13	0	0	
Georgia Southern	John Murphy	Anderson (SC)	4	90–67–22 (.564)	24–23–7 (.509)	8–4–2 (.643)	0	0	0	
Georgia State	Brett Surrency	Jacksonville (asst.)	10	89–75–12 (.540)	89–75–12 (.540)	15–6–3 (.688)	2	0	0	
Howard	Phillip Gyau	St. John's College High School	6	8–72–13 (.156)	8–72–13 (.156)	2–19–3 (.146)	0	0	0	

== Preseason ==
=== Preseason poll ===
The preseason poll was released on August 13, 2019.

	Team ranking	Points	First place votes
1.	Coastal Carolina	28	2
2.	Georgia State	27	2
2.	Georgia Southern	27	1
4.	Central Arkansas	22	1
5.	Appalachian State	15	0
6.	Howard	7	0

=== Preseason national polls ===
The preseason national polls will be released in July and August 2019.

	United; Soccer	CSN	SoccerAmerica	Top DrawerSoccer
Appalachian State	—	—	—	—
Central Arkansas	—	—	—	—
Coastal Carolina	RV	RV	RV	RV
Georgia Southern	—	—	—	—
Georgia State	—	RV	—	—
Howard	—	—	—	—

== Regular season ==
=== Early season tournaments ===
Early season tournaments will be announced in late Spring and Summer 2019.

Team	Tournament	Finish
Coastal Carolina	Portland Tournament	**1st**
Georgia Southern	Aaron Olitsky Tournament	**1st**

=== Results ===
Index to colors and formatting
Sun Belt member won
Sun Belt member lost
Sun Belt member tied
Sun Belt teams in **bold**

All times Eastern time.† denotes Homecoming game

=== Week 1 (Aug. 25–31) ===
Date	Time (ET)	Visiting team	Home team	Site	TV	Result	Attendance	Report
August 30	5:00 PM	**Georgia Southern**	UNCW	Patriot's Point Soccer Stadium • Charleston, SC		**W** 4–2	673	Report
August 30	7:00 PM	#19 St. John's	**Appalachian State**	ASU Soccer Stadium • Boone, NC	AppVision	**L** 0–2	417	Report
August 30	7:00 PM	**Georgia State**	Presbyterian	Martin Stadium at Edens Field • Clinton, SC		**W** 2–1	107	Report
August 30	9:00 PM	Wright State	**Central Arkansas**	Bill Stephens Track and Soccer Complex • Conway, AR		**W** 4–1	185	Report
August 30	10:00 PM	**Coastal Carolina**	#22 Oregon State	Merlo Field • Portland, OR		**W** 2–1	210	Report
August 31	7:00 PM	**Howard**	Longwood	Longwood Athletics Complex • Farmville, VA	ESPN+	**L** 0–3	118	Report

=== Week 2 (Sep. 1–7) ===
Date	Time (ET)	Visiting team	Home team	Site	TV	Result	Attendance	Report
September 1	4:30 PM	**Georgia Southern**	Charleston	Patriot's Point Soccer Stadium • Charleston, SC	CAA.tv	**W** 2–0	457	Report
September 1	5:00 PM	**Coastal Carolina**	#20 Portland	Merlo Field • Portland, OR		**W** 1–0	1,092	Report
September 1	7:00 PM	Loyola (MD)	**Appalachian State**	ASU Soccer Stadium • Boone, NC	AppVision	**W** 2–1	437	Report
September 1	8:00 PM	Campbell	**Central Arkansas**	Bill Stephens Track and Soccer Complex • Conway, AR		**T** 1–1 ^{2OT}	124	Report
September 2	7:00 PM	Belmont	**Georgia State**	GSU Soccer Complex • Decatur, GA		**W** 3–1	108	Report
September 6	7:00 PM	George Mason	**Appalachian State**	ASU Soccer Stadium • Boone, NC	AppVision	**W** 2–0	328	Report
September 6	7:00 PM	**#12 Coastal Carolina**	#10 Charlotte	Transamerica Field • Charlotte, NC		**L** 1–2	1,017	Report
September 6	7:00 PM	Merrimack	**Georgia Southern**	Eagle Field • Statesboro, GA	ESPN+	**Cancelled**		
September 7	6:00 PM	**Georgia State**	UNC Asheville	Greenwood Soccer Field • Asheville, NC		**T** 2–2 ^{2OT}	374	Report
September 7	8:00 PM	Incarnate Wood	**Central Arkansas**	Bill Stephens Track and Soccer Complex • Conway, AR		**W** 2–1	0	Report

=== Week 3 (Sep. 8–14) ===
Date	Time (ET)	Visiting team	Home team	Site	TV	Result	Attendance	Report
September 8	1:00 PM	**Georgia Southern**	#18 Florida Gulf Coast	FGCU Soccer Complex • Fort Myers, FL		**L** 1–5	201	Report
September 8	3:00 PM	American	**Appalachian State**	ASU Soccer Stadium • Boone, NC	AppVision	**W** 1–0	217	Report
September 9	7:00 PM	North Florida	**Georgia State**	GSU Soccer Complex • Decatur, GA		**W** 2–0	131	Report
September 10	3:00 PM	Mount St. Mary's	**Howard**	Greene Stadium • Washington, DC		**L** 0–1	221	Report
September 10	9:00 PM	**Central Arkansas**	Missouri State	Betty & Bobby Allison South Stadium • Springfield, MO		**L** 0–1	568	Report
September 12	3:00 PM	Brown	**Howard**	Greene Stadium • Washington, DC		**L** 0–1	235	Report
September 13	7:00 PM	**#15 Coastal Carolina**	#21 West Virginia	Dick Dlesk Soccer Stadium • Morgantown, WV		**L** 2–5	927	Report
September 13	7:00 PM	**Georgia Southern**	North Florida	Hodges Stadium • Jacksonville, FL		**W** 2–1	140	Report
September 13	8:00 PM	Dayton	**Central Arkansas**	Bill Stephens Track and Soccer Complex • Conway, AR		**W** 2–1	255	Report
September 14	7:00 PM	High Point	**Appalachian State**	ASU Soccer Stadium • Boone, NC		**W** 1–0	527	Report

=== Week 4 (Sep. 15–21) ===
Date	Time (ET)	Visiting team	Home team	Site	TV	Result	Attendance	Report
September 15	12:00 PM	**Howard**	Bryant	Sutton Field • Smithfield, RI		**W** 3–2	150	Report
September 15	2:00 PM	Houston Baptist	**Central Arkansas**	Bill Stephens Track and Soccer Complex • Conway, AR		**W** 4–0	187	Report
September 17	3:00 PM	St. Francis Brooklyn	**Howard**	Greene Stadium • Washington, DC		**L** 0–1	97	Report
September 17	6:00 PM	**Georgia State**	Gardner–Webb	Greene–Harbison Stadium • Boiling Springs, NC		**T** 2–2 ^{2OT}	57	Report
September 17	7:00 PM	**Appalachian State**	Elon	Rudd Field • Elon, NC	ESV	**L** 0–1	632	Report
September 17	7:00 PM	Campbell	**#24 Coastal Carolina**	CCU Soccer Stadium • Conway, SC		**W** 1–0	145	Report
September 18	7:00 PM	**Georgia Southern**	Stetson	Spec Martin Stadium • DeLand, FL		**L** 1–2	229	Report
September 21	7:00 PM	**Appalachian State**	UNCG	UNCG Soccer Stadium • Greensboro, NC	SDN	**W** 4–2	712	Report
September 21	7:00 PM	Radford	**#24 Coastal Carolina**	CCU Soccer Stadium • Conway, SC		**W** 3–2	146	Report
September 21	7:00 PM	Campbell	**Georgia Southern**	Eagle Field • Statesboro, GA	ESPN+	**L** 0–1	450	Report
September 21	7:00 PM	Winthrop	**Georgia State**	GSU Soccer Complex • Decatur, GA		**W** 4–0	98	Report
September 21	8:00 PM	**Central Arkansas**	UTRGV	UTRGV Soccer and Track & Field Complex • Edinburg, TX		**L** 0–1	281	Report
September 21	8:00 PM	**Georgia Southern**	UAB	BBVA Field • Birmingham, AL	CUSA.tv	**W** 3–1	261	Report

=== Week 5 (Sep. 22–28) ===
Date	Time (ET)	Visiting team	Home team	Site	TV	Result	Attendance	Report
September 22	1:00 PM	**Howard**	Robert Morris	North Athletic Complex • Moon Township, PA		**T** 1–1 ^{2OT}	133	Report
September 24	3:00 PM	La Salle	**Howard**	Greene Stadium • Washington, DC		**L** 0–1	240	Report
September 25	7:00 PM	UNC Asheville	**Appalachian State**	ASU Soccer Stadium • Boone, NC	ESPN+	**W** 1–0	723	Report
September 25	7:00 PM	VCU	**#24 Coastal Carolina**	CCU Soccer Stadium • Conway, SC		**T** 1–1 ^{2OT}	95	Report
September 27	7:00 PM	Mercer	**Georgia Southern**	Eagle Field • Statesboro, GA	TBL	**L** 2–3	300	Report
September 28	12:00 PM	**Howard**	VMI	Patchin Field • Lexington, VA		**W** 4–2	75	Report
September 28	7:00 PM	**Georgia State**	ETSU	Summers-Taylor Stadium • Johnson City, TN		**T** 2–2 ^{2OT}	382	Report
September 28	7:30 PM	**#24 Coastal Carolina**	#8 Kentucky	Bell Soccer Complex • Lexington, KY		**L** 0–1	1,195	Report
September 28	8:00 PM	**Central Arkansas**	SIU Edwardsville	Ralph Korte Stadium • Edwardsville, IL		**L** 0–2	475	Report

=== Week 6 (Sep. 29–Oct. 5) ===
Date	Time (ET)	Visiting team	Home team	Site	TV	Result	Attendance	Report
October 1	6:00 PM	**Georgia State**	Stetson	Spec Martin Stadium • DeLand, FL		**W** 1–0	297	Report
October 1	7:00 PM	ETSU	**Appalachian State**	ASU Soccer Stadium • Boone, NC	AppVision	**T** 1–1 ^{2OT}	782	Report
October 1	7:00 PM	USC Upstate	**Coastal Carolina**	CCU Soccer Stadium • Conway, SC		**L** 0–1	122	Report
October 1	7:00 PM	Jacksonville	**Georgia Southern**	Armstrong Soccer Field • Savannah, GA		**L** 0–1	453	Report
October 1	7:00 PM	**Howard**	Radford	Patrick Cupp Stadium • Radford, VA		**L** 1–2 ^{2OT}	679	Report
October 1	8:00 PM	**Central Arkansas**	#8 SMU	Westcott Field • Dallas, TX		**L** 0–3	1,985	Report
October 4	7:00 PM	Wofford	**Georgia Southern**	Eagle Field • Statesboro, GA		**W** 3–2	351	Report
October 5	7:00 PM	William & Mary	**Coastal Carolina**	CCU Soccer Stadium • Conway, SC		**L** 0–1	261	Report
October 5	7:00 PM	Mercer	**Georgia State**	GSU Soccer Complex • Decatur, GA		**W** 2–1 ^{OT}	328	Report

=== Week 7 (Oct. 6–12) ===
Date	Time (ET)	Visiting team	Home team	Site	TV	Result	Attendance	Report
October 6	2:00 PM	**Appalachian State**	**Central Arkansas**	Bill Stephens Track and Soccer Complex • Conway, AR	BNN	**ASU** 1–0	258	Report
October 7	7:00 PM	**Howard**	Pittsburgh	Ambrose Urbanic Field • Pittsburgh, PA	ACCN+	**L** 0–6	207	Report
October 8	7:00 PM	**Georgia Southern**	South Carolina	Stone Stadium • Columbia, SC	SECN+	**T** 1–1 ^{2OT}	1,234	Report
October 8	8:00 PM	Central Baptist	**Central Arkansas**	Bill Stephens Track and Soccer Complex • Conway, AR		**W** 10–0	326	Report
October 8	8:00 PM	**Georgia State**	Lipscomb	Lipscomb Soccer Complex • Nashville, TN		**L** 1–3	234	Report
October 11	5:00 PM	**Coastal Carolina**	**Central Arkansas**	Bill Stephens Track and Soccer Complex • Conway, AR		**UCA** 1–0	387	Report
October 12	7:00 PM	**Howard**	**Appalachian State**	ASU Soccer Stadium • Boone, NC	ESPN+	**ASU** 4–0	815	Report
October 12	7:00 PM	**Georgia Southern**	**Georgia State**	GSU Soccer Complex • Decatur, GA	ESPN+	**GSO** 2–1	382	Report

=== Week 8 (Oct. 13–19) ===
Date	Time (ET)	Visiting team	Home team	Site	TV	Result	Attendance	Report
October 15	1:00 PM	**Howard**	George Washington	Mount Vernon Athletic Field • Washington, DC	A10N	**W** 1–0	122	Report
October 15	7:00 PM	**Coastal Carolina**	UNCW	UNCW Soccer Stadium • Wilmington, NC		**T** 0–0 ^{2OT}	862	Report
October 15	7:00 PM	**Georgia State**	Charlotte	Transamerica Field • Charlotte, NC		**W** 1–0	790	Report
October 16	7:00 PM	UAB	**Appalachian State**	ASU Soccer Stadium • Boone, NC	ESPN+	**W** 2–1 ^{2OT}	517	Report
October 18	8:00 PM	**Central Arkansas**	**Georgia Southern**	Eagle Field • Statesboro, GA		**UCA** 2–1	472	Report
October 19	3:00 PM	**Georgia State**	**Howard**	Greene Stadium • Washington, DC		**HOW** 2–1	261	Report
October 19	7:00 PM	**Coastal Carolina**	**Appalachian State**	ASU Soccer Stadium • Boone, NC	ESPN+	**CCU** 4–2	721	Report

=== Week 9 (Oct. 20–26) ===
Date	Time (ET)	Visiting team	Home team	Site	TV	Result	Attendance	Report
October 22	7:00 PM	Winthrop	**Georgia Southern**	Eagle Field • Statesboro, GA	TBL			
October 22	8:00 PM	**Central Arkansas**	Memphis	Mike Rose Soccer Complex • Memphis, TN				
October 23	7:00 PM	**Coastal Carolina**	Charleston	Patriot's Point Soccer Stadium • Charleston, SC				
October 25	7:00 PM	**Appalachian State**	Penn State	Jeffrey Field • State College, PA	BTN+			
October 26	1:00 PM	**Georgia Southern**	**Howard**	Greene Stadium • Washington, DC				
October 26	2:00 PM	Oral Roberts	**Central Arkansas**	Bill Stephens Track and Soccer Complex • Conway, AR				
October 26	7:00 PM	**Georgia State**	**Coastal Carolina**	CCU Soccer Stadium • Conway, SC				

=== Week 10 (Oct. 27–Nov. 2) ===
Date	Time (ET)	Visiting team	Home team	Site	TV	Result	Attendance	Report
October 29	3:00 PM	St. Bonaventure	**Howard**	Greene Stadium • Washington, DC				
October 29	7:00 PM	**Appalachian State**	North Carolina	Fetzer Field • Chapel Hill, NC	ACCN+			
October 29	7:00 PM	UAB	**Georgia State**	GSU Soccer Complex • Decatur, GA				
November 2	7:00 PM	**Appalachian State**	**Georgia Southern**	Eagle Field • Statesboro, GA	ESPN+			
November 2	8:00 PM	**Central Arkansas**	**Georgia State**	GSU Soccer Complex • Decatur, GA				
November 3	2:00 PM	**Howard**	**Coastal Carolina**	CCU Soccer Stadium • Conway, SC				

=== Week 11 (Nov. 3–Nov. 9) ===
Date	Time (ET)	Visiting team	Home team	Site	TV	Result	Attendance	Report
November 9	7:00 PM	**Georgia State**	**Appalachian State**	ASU Soccer Stadium • Boone, NC	ESPN+			
November 9	7:00 PM	**Georgia Southern**	**Coastal Carolina**	CCU Soccer Stadium • Conway, SC	ESPN+			
November 9	8:00 PM	**Howard**	**Central Arkansas**	Bill Stephens Track and Soccer Complex • Conway, AR	ESPN+			

== Postseason ==
=== Sun Belt Tournament ===
First round November 13
4	Georgia Southern	0
5	Georgia State	4
3	Howard	0
6	Appalachian State	3

Semifinals; November 15
1	Central Arkansas	0
5	Georgia State	1
2	Coastal Carolina	2
6	Appalachian State	1

Championship; November 17
5	Georgia State	1 (5)
2	Coastal Carolina (pen.)	1 (6)

=== NCAA tournament ===
Seed	Region	School	1st round	2nd round	3rd round	Quarterfinals	Semifinals	Championship
—N/a	1	Coastal Carolina	W, 3–2 (OT) at NC State	L, 0–1 (OT) at (8) SMU	—	—	—	—

== Rankings ==
=== National rankings ===
	Improvement in ranking
	Drop in ranking
RV	Received votes but were not ranked in Top 25
NV	No votes received

		Pre	Wk 1	Wk 2	Wk 3	Wk 4	Wk 5	Wk 6	Wk 7	Wk 8	Wk 9	Wk 10	Wk 11	Wk 12	Wk 13	Wk 14	Wk 15	Wk 16	Final
Appalachian State	USC	NV	NV	NV	NV	NV	RV	RV	NV						None released				
Appalachian State	TDS	NV	NV	NV	NV	NV	NV	NV	RV	NV									
Central Arkansas	USC	NV	NV	NV	NV	NV	NV	NV	NV						None released				
Central Arkansas	TDS	NV	NV	NV	NV	NV	NV	NV	NV	NV									
Coastal Carolina	USC	NV	12	15	24	RV	NV	NV	NV						None released				
Coastal Carolina	TDS	NV	NV	NV	NV	NV	NV	NV	NV	NV									
Georgia Southern	USC	NV	RV	NV	NV	NV	NV	NV	NV						None released				
Georgia Southern	TDS	NV	NV	NV	NV	NV	NV	NV	NV	NV									
Georgia State	USC	NV	RV	RV	RV	RV	RV	NV	NV						None released				
Georgia State	TDS	NV	NV	NV	NV	NV	NV	NV	NV	NV									
Howard	USC	NV	NV	NV	NV	NV	NV	NV	NV						None released				
Howard	TDS	NV	NV	NV	NV	NV	NV	NV	NV	NV									

=== Regional rankings - USC Southeast Region ===
	Improvement in ranking
	Drop in ranking
RV	Received votes but were not ranked in Top 10
NV	No votes received

	Wk 1	Wk 2	Wk 3	Wk 4	Wk 5	Wk 6	Wk 7	Wk 8	Wk 9	Wk 10	Wk 11	Wk 12
Appalachian State	NV	7	4	6	6	6	8					
Central Arkansas	NV	NV	NV	9	10	NV	7					
Coastal Carolina	1	2	8	5	5	NV	NV					
Georgia Southern	5	9	NV	NV	NV	8	NV					
Georgia State	7	10	9	8	7	9	9					
Howard	NV	NV	NV	NV	NV	NV	NV					

== Awards and honors ==
=== Postseason honors ===
2019 Sun Belt Conference Men's Soccer Individual Awards
Award	Recipient(s)
Offensive Player of the Year	
Defensive Player of the Year	
Goalkeeper of the Year	
Coach of the Year	
Newcomer of the Year	

2019 Sun Belt Men's Soccer All-Conference Teams
First Team	Second Team	Newcomer Team

== Home Match Attendance ==
Team	Stadium	Capacity	Gm 1	Gm 2	Gm 3	Gm 4	Gm 5	Gm 6	Gm 7	Gm 8	Gm 9	Gm 10	Gm 11	Total	Average	% of Capacity
Appalachian State	ASU Soccer Stadium	1,000	417	437	328	217	527	723	782	—				3,434	491	49.1%
Central Arkansas	Bill Stephens Stadium	500	185	124	310	255	187	—						1,061	212	42.4%
Coastal Carolina	CCU Soccer Field	1,000	145	146	95	122	—							508	127	12.7%
Georgia Southern	Eagle Field	700	450	472	453	—								1,375	458	65.5%
Georgia State	GSU Soccer Field	1,500	108	131	98	—								337	112	7.5%
Howard	Greene Stadium	7,000	221	235	97	240	—							793	199	2.8%

Bold – Exceed capacity
†Season High

== 2020 MLS Draft ==
The 2020 MLS SuperDraft was held in January 2020. No SBC players were selected in the draft.

== Homegrown players ==
The Homegrown Player Rule is a Major League Soccer program that allows MLS teams to sign local players from their own development academies directly to MLS first team rosters. Before the creation of the rule in 2008, every player entering Major League Soccer had to be assigned through one of the existing MLS player allocation processes, such as the MLS SuperDraft.

To place a player on its homegrown player list, making him eligible to sign as a homegrown player, players must have resided in that club's home territory and participated in the club's youth development system for at least one year. Players can play college soccer and still be eligible to sign a homegrown contract. No SBC players signed homegrown contract.
