= 2019 Sun Belt Conference men's soccer tournament =

- Classification: Division I
- Teams: 6
- Matches: 5
- Site: ASU Soccer Stadium; Boone, North Carolina
- Champions: Coastal Carolina (3rd title)
- Winning coach: Shaun Docking (3rd title)
- MVP: Alberto Ciroi (Coastal Carolina)
- Broadcast: ESPN+

2019 Sun Belt Conference men's soccer standings
	Conf.					Overall
Team	W		L		T	W		L		T
Central Arkansas	4	–	1	–	0	10	–	7	–	1
Coastal Carolina ‡	3	–	2	–	0	10	–	8	–	3
Appalachian State	2	–	3	–	0	11	–	7	–	1
Georgia State	2	–	3	–	0	12	–	4	–	4
Georgia Southern	2	–	3	–	0	7	–	9	–	2
Howard	2	–	3	–	0	5	–	12	–	1
‡ – Sun Belt Tournament Champion + – Invited to the 2019 NCAA tournament; As of 29 November 2019; Rankings from United Soccer Coaches

The 2019 Sun Belt Conference men's soccer tournament was the 25th edition of the Sun Belt Conference Men's Soccer Tournament. The tournament decided the Sun Belt Conference champion as well as the conference's automatic berth into the 2019 NCAA Division I men's soccer tournament. The tournament began on November 13 and concluded on November 17, 2019.

Appalachian State hosted the tournament, and all matches were played at ASU Soccer Stadium in Boone, North Carolina.

Coastal Carolina won the tournament, defeating fifth-seed and defending champions, Georgia State, 6–5, on penalty kicks after 1–1 draw. Coastal Carolina earned the conference's berth into the NCAA Tournament, where they reached the second round before losing to SMU.

== Seeds ==
Seed	School	Conference	Tiebreaker
1	Central Arkansas	4–1–0	
2	Coastal Carolina	3–2–0	
3	Howard	2–3–0	2–1 record vs. GSO, GSU, and ASU
4	Georgia Southern	2–3–0	2–1 record vs. HOW, GSU, and ASU
5	Georgia State	2–3–0	1–2 record vs. HOW, GSO, and ASU
6	Appalachian State	2–3–0	1–2 record vs. HOW, GSO, and GSU

== Bracket ==
First round November 13
4	Georgia Southern	0
5	Georgia State	4
3	Howard	0
6	Appalachian State	3

Semifinals; November 15
1	Central Arkansas	0
5	Georgia State	1
2	Coastal Carolina	2
6	Appalachian State	1

Championship; November 17
5	Georgia State	1 (5)
2	Coastal Carolina (pen.)	1 (6)

== Results ==
=== First round ===
November 13
16:00 EDT

No. 4 Georgia Southern	0–4	No. 5 Georgia State
	Report	Briggs 25', 78'; Fearnley 61'; Jumeau 79'

ASU Soccer Stadium, Boone
Attendance: 35
Referee: Dustin Thorne

November 13
19:00 EDT

No. 3 Howard	0–3	No. 6 Appalachian State
	Report	Robicheaux 20'; Pfrogner 44'; Hernandez 90' (pen.)

ASU Soccer Stadium, Boone
Attendance: 220
Referee: Sergii Demianchuk

=== Semifinals ===
November 15
16:00 EDT

No. 1 Central Arkansas	0–1	No. 5 Georgia State
	Report	Summerfield 76'

ASU Soccer Stadium, Boone
Attendance: 75
Referee: Brandon Marion

November 15
19:00 EDT

No. 2 Coastal Carolina	2–1	No. 6 Appalachian State
Skraep 6'; Snaith 10'	Report	Darden 77'

ASU Soccer Stadium, Boone
Attendance: 482
Referee: Andrew Musashe

=== Final ===
November 17
13:00 EDT

No. 2 Coastal Carolina	1–1 (a.e.t.)	No. 5 Georgia State
Snaith 89'	Report	Fearnley 87'
Penalties
Snaith (penalty missed); Endale (penalty scored); Power (penalty scored); Mondi (penalty scored); Rzepecki (penalty scored); Williams (penalty scored); Riihjarvi (penalty scored)	6–5	(penalty scored) Proctor; (penalty missed) Briggs; (penalty scored) Read; (penalty scored) Finnie; (penalty scored) Clinton; (penalty scored) Fearnley; (penalty missed) Rosenwald

ASU Soccer Stadium, Boone
Attendance: 182
Referee: Mark Kadlecik

== Top goalscorers ==
Rank	Player	College	Goals
1	(United States) Aris Briggs	Georgia State	2
1	(England) Matthew Fearnley	Georgia State	2
1	(Wales) Sam Snaith	Coastal Carolina	2
2	(United States) Mason Darden	Appalachian State	1
2	(England) Tristan Jumeau	Georgia State	1
2	(Germany) Marc Pfronger	Appalachian State	1
2	(United States) Mason Robicheaux	Appalachian State	1
2	(Denmark) Kasper Skraep	Coastal Carolina	1
2	(England) Alex Summerfield	Georgia State	1

== Sun Belt Tournament Best XI ==
Player	Team
**Sun Belt Men's Soccer All-Tournament team**
Alex McGrath	Appalachian State
Mason Robicheaux	Appalachian State
Ole Kjoerholt	Central Arkansas
Nate Lancaster	Central Arkansas
Freddie Read	Georgia State
Alex Summerfield	Georgia State
Paul Tyson	Georgia State
Jeranimo Power	Coastal Carolina
Kasper Skraep	Coastal Carolina
Sam Snaith	Coastal Carolina
**Alberto Ciroi**	Coastal Carolina

MVP in Bold
