= Sun Belt Conference men's soccer tournament =

- Sport: College soccer
- Conference: Sun Belt Conference
- Number of teams: 8
- Format: Single-elimination
- Current stadium: Campus sites
- Played: 1976–1995; 2014–2020; 2022–present
- Last contest: 2026
- Current champion: West Virginia (2nd title)
- Most championships: South Florida (9)
- TV partner: ESPN+
- Official website: sunbeltsports.org/msoc

The Sun Belt Conference men's soccer tournament is the conference championship tournament in soccer for the Sun Belt Conference (SBC). The tournament was held from 1976 through 1995, when the sport was discontinued.

The tournament resumed in 2014 when the conference reinstated men's soccer, and was discontinued again when the conference dropped men's soccer for the second time after the 2020–21 season. The SBC later announced that men's soccer would be reinstated again in 2022, and the tournament resumed at that time.

It is a single-elimination tournament involving the top eight teams in the SBC regular-season standings, with seeding based on record. Starting with the 2022 tournament, the quarterfinals and semifinals are hosted by the top two seeds, with the final being held at the home field of the top surviving seed. The winner, declared conference champion, receives the conference's automatic bid to the NCAA Division I men's soccer championship.

South Florida is the most winning team of the tournament with 9 titles.

== Champions ==
=== Finals ===
Key

- (1) – Title number
- a.e.t. – Match went to extra time
- p – Match decided by a penalty shootout after extra time
- – Winning team won regular season

Ed.	Year	Champion	Score	Runner-up	Venue	City	Tournament MVP
1	1976	South Florida (1)	6–1	Georgia State	Southern Oak Stadium	Jacksonville, FL	MVP (School)
2	1977	South Florida (2)	4–3	Jacksonville	USF Soccer Stadium	Tampa, FL	Fran Lemmons (USF)
3	1978	Jacksonville (1)	2–1	Georgia State	USF Soccer Stadium	Tampa, FL	Aleks Mihailović (JAX)
4	1979	South Florida (3)	3–2 (a.e.t.)	Charlotte	GSU Soccer Field	Atlanta, GA	Ralph Baker (USF)
5	1980	South Florida (4)	2–1	Georgia State	Memorial Stadium	Charlotte, NC	Nigel Clark (USF)
6	1981	South Florida (5)	2–1	South Alabama	USF Soccer Stadium	Tampa, FL	Jay Whitr (USF)
7	1982	South Florida (6)	2–1	Old Dominion	USF Soccer Stadium	Tampa, FL	Roy Wegerle (USF)
8	1983	Charlotte (1)	0–0 (a.e.t.)	Old Dominion	Foreman Field	Norfolk, VA	Craig Brown (UNCC)
9	1984	Old Dominion (1)	2–1	South Florida	Ladd–Peebles Stadium	Mobile, AL	Alvaro Ibanez (ODU)
10	1985	South Florida (7)	2–2 (p)	Old Dominion	Foreman Field	Norfolk, VA	Ray Perler (USF)
11	1986	South Florida (8)	1–0	Western Kentucky	USF Soccer Stadium	Tampa, FL	Aris Bogdaneris (USF)
12	1987	Old Dominion (2)	1–0	South Alabama	Foreman Field	Norfolk, VA	Chris Haywood (ODU)
13	1988	South Florida (9)	1–1 (p)	Old Dominion	Ladd–Peebles Stadium	Mobile, AL	Sean Crowley (ODU)
14	1989	Old Dominion (3)	1–1 (p)	South Alabama	Old Dominion Complex	Norfolk, VA	Rick Jenik (ODU)
15	1990	(no tournament held)					
16	1991	South Alabama (1)	3–0	Western Kentucky	Ladd–Peebles Stadium	Mobile, AL	Stephen Small (USA)
17	1992	Western Kentucky (1)	1–1 (p)	South Alabama	Ladd–Peebles Stadium	Mobile, AL	Stephen Small (USA)
18	1993	South Alabama (2)	5–0	Little Rock	UTPA Soccer Field	Edinburg, TX	Luke Whittle (USA)
19	1994	South Alabama (3)	3–0	Western Kentucky	Ladd–Peebles Stadium	Mobile, AL	Dale Edwards (USA)
20	1995	South Alabama (4)	3–2	Western Kentucky	WKU Soccer Complex	Bowling Green, KY	Shaun Rothuysen (USA)
–	(Sun Belt did not sponsor men's soccer in 1997–2013)						
21	2014	Hartwick (1)	1–0	Georgia Southern	Erk Russell Park	Statesboro, GA	Kit Tregear (HWCK)
22	2015	Hartwick (2)	2–0	Georgia State	ASU Soccer Stadium	Boone, NC	Jamie O’Grady (HWCK)
23	2016	Coastal Carolina (1)	1–0	Georgia State	GSU Soccer Field	Atlanta, GA	Jair Espinoza (CCU)
24	2017	Coastal Carolina (2)	2–0	Georgia State	CCU Soccer Field	Conway, SC	Frantzdy Pierrot (CCU)
25	2018	Georgia State	4–2	Georgia Southern	Eagle Field	Statesboro, GA	Hannes Burmeister (GSU)
26	2019	Coastal Carolina (3)	1–1 (6–5 p)	Georgia State	ASU Soccer Stadium	Boone, NC	Alberto Ciroi (CCU)
27	2020	Coastal Carolina (4)	0–0 (4–3 p)	Georgia State	Center Parc Stadium	Atlanta, GA	Tor Saunders (CCU)
–	2021	(Sun Belt did not sponsor men's soccer)					
28	2022	Kentucky (1)	2–0	James Madison	Bell Soccer Complex	Lexington, KY	Clay Holstad (UK)
29	2023	Marshall (1)	3–2	West Virginia	Hoops Family Field	Huntington, WV	Álvaro García Pascual (MU)
30	2024	West Virginia (1)	0–0 (6–5 p)	Marshall	Dick Dlesk Soccer Stadium	Morgantown, WV	Sergio Ors Navarro (WVU)
31	2025	UCF (1)	3–1	Marshall	Hoops Family Field	Huntington, WV	Lilian Ricol (UCF)
32	2026	West Virginia (2)	4–0	South Carolina	Dick Dlesk Soccer Stadium	Morgantown, WV	Pablo Pozos (WVU)

== Statistics ==
=== All-time champions ===
Key

- Teams in italic no longer member of the SBC.
- ^{1} no longer sponsor men's soccer.

College	Titles	Last won	Runn.	Last lost
South Florida	9	1988	1	1984
Coastal Carolina	4	2020	0	—N/a
South Alabama	4	1995	3	1989
Old Dominion	3	1989	4	1988
West Virginia	2	2026	1	2023
Hartwick	2	2015	0	—N/a
Georgia State	1	2018	4	2020
WKU^{1}	1	1992	4	1995
Marshall	1	2023	2	2025
Charlotte	1	1983	1	1979
Jacksonville	1	1978	1	1977
UCF	1	2025	0	—N/a
Kentucky	1	2022	0	—N/a
Georgia Southern	0	—N/a	1	2014
James Madison	0	—N/a	1	2022
Little Rock^{1}	0	—N/a	1	1993
South Carolina	0	—N/a	1	2026
