= 2017 Sun Belt Conference men's soccer tournament =

- Classification: Division I
- Teams: 6
- Matches: 5
- Site: CCU Soccer Field; Conway, South Carolina
- Champions: Coastal Carolina (2nd title)
- Broadcast: ESPN3

2017 Sun Belt Conference men's soccer standings
	Conf.					Overall
Team	W		L		T	W		L		T
No. 15 Coastal Carolina ‡	4	–	1	–	0	14	–	7	–	1
Georgia State	3	–	1	–	1	12	–	7	–	1
Georgia Southern	3	–	2	–	0	9	–	8	–	1
Hartwick	2	–	2	–	1	7	–	9	–	2
Appalachian State	0	–	3	–	2	5	–	8	–	6
Howard	0	–	3	–	2	2	–	15	–	3
‡-Sun Belt Tournament Champion +-Invited to the 2017 NCAA Division I Men's Soccer Championship; As of December 13, 2017; Rankings from United Soccer Coaches

The 2017 Sun Belt Conference men's soccer tournament, was the 23rd edition of the tournament. It determined the Sun Belt Conference's automatic berth into the 2017 NCAA Division I Men's Soccer Championship. The tournament was hosted by Coastal Carolina, and all matches were played at CCU Soccer Field.

The 2017 final was a rematch of last year's final. Top-seed and host, Coastal Carolina won their second consecutive Sun Belt title, defeating Georgia State, 2-0 in the final. Coastal Carolina would advance to the 2017 NCAA Division I Men's Soccer Championship, where they reached the Sweet 16. One of the largest upsets in the tournament was Howard, who reached the semifinals after defeating Hartwick, 2-1. It was Howard's second win of the entire season.

== Seeding ==
All six programs qualified for the Sun Belt Tournament.

No.	School	W	L	T	PCT.	Pts.
1	Coastal Carolina	4	1	0	.800	12
2	Georgia State	3	1	1	.700	10
3	Georgia Southern	3	2	0	.600	9
4	Hartwick	2	2	1	.500	7
5	Howard	0	3	2	.300	2
6	Appalachian State	0	3	2	.200	2

== Bracket ==
First round November 10
4	Hartwick	0
5	Howard	1
3	Georgia Southern (pen.)	0 (5)
6	Appalachian State	0 (4)

Semifinals; November 11
1	Coastal Carolina	2
5	Howard	1
2	Georgia State	3
3	Georgia Southern	1

Championship; November 12
1	Coastal Carolina	2
2	Georgia State	0

== Results ==
=== First round ===
November 10
10:00 AM EST

^{No. 3} Georgia Southern Eagles	0–0 (a.e.t.)	^{No. 6} Appalachian State Mountaineers
	Report
Penalties
Wilson (penalty scored); Wang (penalty scored); Laursen (penalty scored); Bronstorph (penalty missed); Carbonell (penalty scored); Cortes (penalty scored)	5–4	(penalty scored) Bennett; (penalty scored) Walrath; (penalty scored) Hernandez; (penalty scored) Davidson; (penalty missed) Kollmannthaler; (penalty missed) Perinchief

CCU Soccer Field, Conway, South Carolina
Attendance: 100
Referee: Jan Halaska

November 10
2:00 PM EST

^{No. 4} Hartwick Hawks	0–1	^{No. 5} Howard Bisons
	Report	Celestine 31'

CCU Soccer Field, Conway, South Carolina
Attendance: 126
Referee: Sergio Gonzalez

=== Semifinals ===
November 11
10:00 AM EST

^{No. 2} Georgia State Panthers	3–1	^{No. 3} Georgia Southern Eagles
Rosenwald 33'; Hemmings 54'; Joyner 78'	Report	Wilson 68'

CCU Soccer Field, Conway, South Carolina
Attendance: Not reported
Referee: Richonne Clard

November 11
12:30 PM EST

^{No. 1} Coastal Carolina Chanticleers	2–1	^{No. 5} Howard Bisons
Piggott 7'; Pierrot 82'	Report	Gomez 51'

CCU Soccer Field, Conway, South Carolina
Attendance: Not reported
Referee: Dustin Thomas

=== Final ===
November 12
1:00 PM EST

^{No. 1} Coastal Carolina Chanticleers	2–0	^{No. 2} Georgia State Panthers
Al Hameli 31'; Melchor 86'	Report

CCU Soccer Field, Conway, South Carolina
Attendance: 700
Referee: Mark Kadlecik

== Statistics ==
=== Goals ===
Rank	Player	College	Goals
1	(United Arab Emirates) Saif Al Hameli	Coastal Carolina	1
1	(Trinidad and Tobago) Kyle Celestine	Howard	1
1	(United States) Andres Gomez	Howard	1
1	(England) Max Hemmings	Georgia State	1
1	(United States) Lukas Joyner	Georgia State	1
1	(United States) Martin Melchor	Coastal Carolina	1
1	(Panama) Romario Piggott	Coastal Carolina	1
1	(England) Frank Rosenwald	Georgia State	1
1	(United States) Blake Wilson	Georgia Southern	1
1	(Germany) Bene Burba	Georgia State	1

=== Assists ===
Rank	Player	College	Assists
1	(Nigeria) Rashid Alarape	Georgia State	1
1	(Spain) Javier Carbonell	Georgia Southern	1
1	(England) Liam Fitzsimmons	Georgia State	1
1	(United States) Alex Ierides	Coastal Carolina	1
1	(United States) Salomon Lorenzano	Georgia State	1
1	(Cameroon) Isaac Mbappe	Howard	1
1	(United States) Frantzdy Pierrot	Coastal Carolina	1
1	(United States) Darius Strambler	Coastal Carolina	1

=== Shutouts ===
Rank	Player	College	Shutouts
1	(United States) Jake Agnew	Appalachian State	1
1	(United States) Carlos Caro	Howard	1
1	(United States) Robert Flott	Georgia Southern	1
1	(United States) Braulio Linares-Ortiz	Coastal Carolina	1

== See also ==
- 2017 Sun Belt Conference Women's Soccer Tournament
