= 2016 Sun Belt Conference men's soccer tournament =

- Classification: Division I
- Teams: 7
- Matches: 6
- Attendance: 2,465
- Site: Atlanta, Georgia
- Champions: Coastal Carolina (1st title)
- Winning coach: Shaun Docking (1st title)
- Broadcast: ESPN3

2016 Sun Belt Conference men's soccer standings
	Conf.					Overall
Team	W		L		T	W		L		T
Coastal Carolina ‡	3	–	1	–	1	10	–	7	–	3
Georgia Southern	3	–	1	–	1	8	–	8	–	3
Georgia State	3	–	2	–	0	15	–	7	–	0
Hartwick	2	–	2	–	1	9	–	6	–	4
Appalachian State	1	–	3	–	1	5	–	9	–	4
Howard	1	–	4	–	0	2	–	14	–	3
‡-Tournament Champion +-Invited to the 2016 NCAA Division I Men's Soccer Championship; As of 21 November 2016; Rankings from NSCAA

The 2016 Sun Belt Conference men's soccer tournament, was the 9th edition of the tournament. It determined the Sun Belt Conference's automatic berth into the 2016 NCAA Division I Men's Soccer Championship.

Coastal Carolina won the Sun Belt title, making it their first Sun Belt championship, but their 13th overall conference tournament title. The Chanticleers defeated Georgia State in the championship, 1–0.

== Seeding ==
All six programs qualified for the Sun Belt Tournament.

No.	School	W	L	T	PCT.	Pts.
1	Coastal Carolina	3	1	1	.700	13
2	Georgia Southern	3	1	1	.700	13
3	Georgia State	3	2	0	.600	9
4	Hartwick	2	2	1	.500	7
5	Appalachian State	1	3	1	.300	4
6	Howard	1	4	0	.200	3

== Bracket ==
First round November 10
4	Hartwick	2
5	App State	1
3	Georgia State	2
6	Howard	0

Semifinals; November 11
1	Coastal Carolina	2
4	Hartwick	0
2	Georgia Southern	0
3	Georgia State	2

Championship; November 13
1	Coastal Carolina	1
3	Georgia State	0

== Matches ==
=== First round ===
10 November	Hartwick	2-1	Appalachian State	Decatur, Georgia
3:00 p.m. EST	Hamish Ritchie 68'; Maurizio Fornerino 80'	Report	Graham Smalley 84'	Stadium: GSU Soccer Complex; Attendance: 245

10 November	Georgia State	2-0	Howard	Decatur, Georgia
6:30 p.m. EST	Kwaku Adu 43'; Andrew Thompson 89'	Report		Stadium: GSU Soccer Complex; Attendance: 425

=== Semifinals ===
10 November	Coastal Carolina	2-1	Hartwick	Decatur, Georgia
3:00 p.m. EST	Frantzdy Pierrot 37', 44'	Report		Stadium: GSU Soccer Complex; Attendance: 261

10 November	Georgia Southern	0-2	Georgia State	Decatur, Georgia
6:30 p.m. EST	Kwaku Adu 51'; Rashid Alarape 75'	Report		Stadium: GSU Soccer Complex; Attendance: 713

=== Final ===
13 November
1:00 p.m. EST

Coastal Carolina	1–0	Georgia State
Jair Espinoza 68'	Report

GSU Soccer Complex, Decatur, Georgia
Attendance: 821

== Awards ==
Sun Belt Men's Soccer All-Tournament team

Graham Smalley (Appalachian State, Freshman, Midfielder)
Einar Einarsson (Coastal Carolina, Senior, Defender)
Henrik Muller (Coastal Carolina, Junior, Defender)
Frantzdy Pierrot (Coastal Carolina, Junior, Forward)
Emil Laursen (Georgia Southern, Sophomore, Defender)
Kwaku Adu-Boahene (Georgia State, Sophomore, Forward)
Hannes Burmeister (Georgia State, Sophomore, Midfielder)
Liam Fitzsimmons (Georgia State, Redshirt Sophomore, Defender)
Hamish Ritchie (Hartwick, Freshman, Midfielder)
Kenneth Hersey (Howard, Redshirt Senior, Goalkeeper)
