= 2014 Sun Belt Conference men's soccer tournament =

2014 Sun Belt men's soccer tournament
Tournament details
- Country: United States
- Teams: 5

Final positions
- Champions: Hartwick
- Runners-up: Georgia Southern

Tournament statistics
- Matches played: 4
- Goals scored: 7 (1.75 per match)
- Top goal scorer: Tied (1 goal by 7 players)

2014 Sun Belt Conference men's soccer standings
	Conf.					Overall
Team	W		L		T	W		L		T
Hartwick ‡	3	–	1	–	1	6	–	10	–	4
Georgia State	3	–	2	–	0	8	–	10	–	0
Georgia Southern	3	–	2	–	0	8	–	9	–	0
NJIT	2	–	3	–	0	7	–	7	–	4
Appalachian State	1	–	2	–	2	7	–	8	–	3
Howard	1	–	3	–	1	2	–	15	–	2
‡ - Tournament champion + - Invited to the NCAA Division I Men's Soccer Championship; As of November 21, 2014; Rankings from NSCAA

The 2014 Sun Belt Conference men's soccer tournament was the 12th overall tournament and the first Sun Belt Conference tournament since 1995.

Held from November 14–16 at Eagle Field in Statesboro, Georgia, it determined the Sun Belt Conference champion, and the automatic berth into the 2014 NCAA Division I Men's Soccer Championship. The Hartwick Hawks won the title, defeating hosts, Georgia Southern Eagles in the final, 1–0.

== Bracket ==
Play-in round
4	NJIT	0
5	Appalachian State	1

Semifinals
1	Hartwick	2
5	Appalachian State	0
2	Georgia State	1
3	Georgia Southern	2

Championship
1	Hartwick	1
3	Georgia Southern	0

== Schedule ==
=== First round ===
November 13	NJIT Highlanders	0–1	Appalachian State Mountaineers	Statesboro, Georgia
6:30 p.m. EST		Report	Chapman 78'	Stadium: Eagle Field; Attendance: 58; Referee: Jonathan Weiner

=== Semi-finals ===
November 14	Hartwick Hawks	2–0	Appalachian State Mountaineers	Statesboro, Georgia
3:00 p.m. EST	Beckford 9'; Rood 22'	Report		Stadium: Eagle Field; Attendance: 545; Referee: Lance Van Haisma

November 14	Georgia State Panthers	1–2	Georgia Southern Eagles	Statesboro, Georgia
6:30 p.m. EST	Abraham 6'	Report	Dinka 15'; Raji 71'	Stadium: Eagle Field; Attendance: 836; Referee: Jonathan Weiner

=== Sun Belt Championship ===
November 16	Hartwick Hawks	1–0	Georgia Southern Eagles	Statesboro, Georgia
5:00 p.m. ST	O'Grady 65'	Report		Stadium: Eagle Field; Attendance: 957; Referee: Kevin Terry

== Statistical leaders ==
To be determined once the tournament begins.

== See also ==
- Sunt Belt Conference
- 2014 Sun Belt Conference men's soccer season
- 2014 NCAA Division I men's soccer season
- 2014 NCAA Division I Men's Soccer Championship
