= 2015 Sun Belt Conference men's soccer tournament =

Tournament details
- Country: United States
- Teams: 5

Final positions
- Champions: Hartwick
- Runners-up: Georgia State

Tournament statistics
- Matches played: 4
- Goals scored: 13 (3.25 per match)
- Top goal scorer: Jamie O'Grady (2)

Awards
- Best player: Jamie O'Grady

The 2015 Sun Belt Conference men's soccer tournament was the 13th edition of the tournament, and the second since the conference reinstated the sport in 2013. It determined the Sun Belt Conference's automatic berth into the 2015 NCAA Division I Men's Soccer Championship.

The Hartwick Hawks won the tournament, defeating the Georgia State Panthers in the championship match.

== Qualification ==
2015 Sun Belt Conference men's soccer standings
	Conf.					Overall
Team	W		L		T	W		L		T
Hartwick ‡	5	–	0	–	0	11	–	6	–	3
Georgia State	4	–	1	–	0	9	–	8	–	1
Georgia Southern	3	–	2	–	0	6	–	8	–	2
Appalachian State	2	–	3	–	0	8	–	10	–	0
NJIT	1	–	4	–	0	5	–	10	–	4
Howard	0	–	5	–	0	0	–	17	–	2
‡-Tournament Champion +-Invited to the NCAA Division I Men's Soccer Championship; As of November 20, 2015; Rankings from NSCAA

The top five teams in the Sun Belt Conference based on their conference regular season records qualified for the tournament.

== Bracket ==
Play-in round
4	Appalachian State	2
5	NJIT	1

Semifinals
1	Hartwick	1
4	Appalachian State	0
2	Georgia State (pen.)	3 (5)
3	Georgia Southern	3 (4)

Final
1	Hartwick	3
2	Georgia State	0

== Schedule ==
=== Play-in round ===
November 12	Appalachian State	2–1	NJIT	Boone, North Carolina
6:30 PM ET	Hemphill 40'; Beranger 74'	Report	Mercer 13'	Stadium: ASU Soccer Stadium; Attendance: 1,175; Referee: Lance Van Haitsma

=== Semi-finals ===
November 13	Georgia State	3–3 (5–4 p)	Georgia Southern	Boone, North Carolina
3:00 PM ET	Wilding 43'; Alarape 54'; Shultis 64'	Report	Abdellaoui 1'; Dinka 20'; Park 33'	Stadium: ASU Soccer Stadium; Referee: Richonne Clark
	Penalties
	Wilding (penalty scored); Plasker (penalty scored); Burmeister (penalty scored); Hemmings (penalty missed); Joyner (penalty scored); Elkhalil (penalty scored)		(penalty scored) Laursen; (penalty scored) Abdellaoui; (penalty scored) Melton; (penalty scored) Park; (penalty missed) Loyden; (penalty missed) Rector

November 13	Hartwick	1–0	Appalachian State	Boone, North Carolina
6:30 PM ET	O'Grady 67'	Report		Stadium: ASU Soccer Stadium; Referee: Nima Seghefi

=== Championship ===
November 15	Hartwick	3–0	Georgia State	Boone, North Carolina
1:00 PM ET	Rood 6'; O'Grady 33'; Berry 59'	Report		Stadium: ASU Soccer Stadium; Attendance: 102; Referee: Robert Sibiga

== Statistical leaders ==
=== Top goalscorers ===
Rank	Player	College	Goals
1	(Scotland) Jamie O'Grady	Hartwick	2
2	(United States) Adam Abdellaoui	Georgia Southern	1
2	(United States) Rashid Alarape	Georgia State	1
2	(France) Alex Beranger	Appalachian State	1
2	(Scotland) Marc Berry	Hartwick	1
2	(United States) Eric Dinka	Georgia Southern	1
2	(United States) Trey Hemphill	Appalachian State	1
2	(United States) Josh Mercer	NJIT	1
2	(United States) Mike Rood	Hartwick	1
2	(United States) Chase Park	Georgia Southern	1
2	(United States) Casey Shultis	Georgia State	1
2	(England) Eddie Wilding	Georgia State	1

As of 22 December 2015

== Tournament Best XI ==
- Alex Beranger, Appalachian State
- Trey Hemphill, Appalachian State
- Emmanuel Raji, Georgia Southern
- Chase Park, Georgia Southern
- Rashid Alarape, Georgia State
- Nomas Cisic, Georgia State
- Amiri Abraham, Georgia State
- Dean Fowler, Hartwick
- Lenny Wilson, Hartwick
- Mike Rood, Hartwick
- Joshua Mercer, NJIT

== See also ==
- Sun Belt Conference
- 2015 Sun Belt Conference men's soccer season
- 2015 NCAA Division I men's soccer season
- 2015 NCAA Division I Men's Soccer Championship
