= 2019 Coastal Carolina Chanticleers men's soccer team =

American college soccer season

2019 Coastal Carolina Chanticleers men's soccer

Sun Belt Tournament Champions

NCAA Tournament Second Round
- Conference: Sun Belt Conference
- Record: 10–8–3 (3–2–0 Sun Belt)
- Head coach: Shaun Docking (22nd season)
- Assistant coaches: Kyle Russell (10th season); Kyle Timm (3rd season)
- Home stadium: Coastal Carolina University Soccer Field

2019 Sun Belt Conference men's soccer standings
	Conf.					Overall
Team	W		L		T	W		L		T
Central Arkansas	4	–	1	–	0	10	–	7	–	1
Coastal Carolina ‡	3	–	2	–	0	10	–	8	–	3
Appalachian State	2	–	3	–	0	11	–	7	–	1
Georgia State	2	–	3	–	0	12	–	4	–	4
Georgia Southern	2	–	3	–	0	7	–	9	–	2
Howard	2	–	3	–	0	5	–	12	–	1
‡ – Sun Belt Tournament Champion + – Invited to the 2019 NCAA tournament; As of 29 November 2019; Rankings from United Soccer Coaches

The 2019 Coastal Carolina Chanticleers men's soccer team represented Coastal Carolina University during the 2019 NCAA Division I men's soccer season and the 2019 Sun Belt Conference men's soccer season. The regular season began on August 30 and concluded on November 9. It was the program's 42nd season fielding a men's varsity soccer team, and their 4th season in the Sun Belt. The 2019 season was Shaun Docking's 22nd year as head coach for the program.

== Roster ==
As of November 29, 2019

Note: Flags indicate national team as defined under FIFA eligibility rules; some limited exceptions apply. Players may hold more than one non-FIFA nationality.

No.	Pos.	Nation	Player
1	GK	(Italy) ITA	Alberto Ciroi
3	DF	(Germany) GER	Morten Timm
4	DF	(South Africa) RSA	Nicholas Itopoulos
5	DF	(Hong Kong) HKG	Oliver Gerbig
6	DF	(Denmark) DEN	Kasper Skraep
7	FW	(South Africa) RSA	Tsiki Ntsabeleng
8	MF	(United States) USA	Michael Boakye
9	FW	(Italy) ITA	Claudio Repetto
10	MF	(South Africa) RSA	Tyrone Mondi
11	FW	(Wales) WAL	Sam Snaith
12	MF	(South Africa) RSA	Jeranimo Power
13	MF	(United States) USA	Antonio La Gamba
14	DF	(United States) USA	Archie Filliter
15	MF	(United States) USA	Luke Williams
16	DF	(Finland) FIN	Paavo Riihijarvi

No.	Pos.	Nation	Player
17	MF	(France) FRA	Emile Rzepecki
18	MF	(United States) USA	Danny Cabrera
19	MF	(United States) USA	Steven Riad
20	MF	(United States) USA	DZ Harmon
21	FW	(United States) USA	Austin D'Anna
22	DF	(United States) USA	Naty Endale
23	DF	(Germany) GER	Paul Odendahl
24	MF	(Norway) NOR	Martin Rydningen
25	DF	(United States) USA	Marcelo Lage
26	DF	(Germany) GER	Luke Muhlbauer
27	MF	(United States) USA	Jason Kemble
28	GK	(United States) USA	Chris Dattalo
29	GK	(United States) USA	Lance DaSilva
30	GK	(United States) USA	Thomas Zinngrebe

== Schedule ==
Date Time, TV	Rank^{#}	Opponent^{#}	Result	Record	Site (Attendance) City, State
Non-conference regular season
August 30*; 10:30 p.m.		at No. 22 Oregon State; Portland Tournament	W 2–1	1–0–0	Paul Lorenz Field (210); Corvallis, OR
September 1*; 8:00 p.m.		at No. 20 Portland; Portland Tournament	W 1–0	2–0–0	Merlo Field (1,092); Portland, OR
September 6*; 7:00 p.m.	No. 12	at No. 17 Charlotte	L 1–2 ^{2OT}	2–1–0	Transamerica Field; Charlotte, NC
September 13*; 7:00 p.m.	No. 15	at West Virginia	L 2–5	2–2–0	Dick Dlesk Soccer Stadium (927); Morgantown, WV
September 17*; 7:00 p.m.		Campbell	W 1–0	3–2–0	CCU Soccer Field (145); Conway, SC
September 21*; 7:00 p.m.		Radford	W 3–2	4–2–0	CCU Soccer Field (146); Conway, SC
September 25*; 7:00 p.m.		VCU	T 1–1 ^{2OT}	4–2–1	CCU Soccer Field (95); Conway, SC
September 28*; 7:30 p.m.		at No. 23 Kentucky	L 0–1	4–3–1	Wendell & Vickie Bell Soccer Complex (1,195); Lexington, KY
October 1*; 7:00 p.m.		USC Upstate	L 0–1	4–4–1	CCU Soccer Field (122); Conway, SC
October 5*; 7:00 p.m.		William & Mary	L 0–1 ^{OT}	4–5–1	CCU Soccer Field (261); Conway, SC
Sun Belt Conference regular season
October 11; 5:00 p.m.		at Central Arkansas	L 0–1	4–6–1 (0–1–0)	Bill Stephens Complex (387); Conway, AR
October 15*; 7:00 p.m.		at UNC Wilmington	T 0–0 ^{2OT}	4–6–2	UNCW Soccer Stadium (862); Wilmington, NC
October 19; 7:00 p.m.		at Appalachian State	W 4–2	5–6–2 (1–1–0)	ASU Soccer Stadium (721); Boone, NC
October 23*; 7:00 p.m.		at College of Charleston	W 2–1	6–6–2	CofC Soccer Stadium at Patriot's Point (241); Mount Pleasant, SC
October 26; 2:00 p.m.		Georgia State	L 0–1	6–7–2 (1–2–0)	CCU Soccer Field (328); Conway, SC
November 3; 2:00 p.m.		Howard	W 2–0	7–7–2 (2–2–0)	CCU Soccer Field (107); Conway, SC
November 9; 7:00 p.m.		Georgia Southern	W 4–0	8–7–2 (3–2–0)	CCU Soccer Field; Conway, SC
Sun Belt Conference Tournament
November 15; 7:00 p.m.	(2)	at (3) Appalachian State; Semifinals	W 2–1	9–7–2	ASU Soccer Stadium (482); Boone, NC
November 17; 1:00 p.m., ESPN+	(2)	vs. (4) Georgia State; Championship Game	T 1–1 (6–5 PKs) ^{2OT}	9–7–3	ASU Soccer Stadium (182); Boone, NC
NCAA Tournament
November 21; 7:00 p.m.		at NC State; First Round	W 3–2 ^{2OT}	10–7–3	Dail Soccer Stadium (538); Raleigh, NC
November 24; 8:00 p.m.		at (8) No. 5 SMU; Second Round	L 0–1 ^{2OT}	10–8–3	Westcott Field (1,150); Dallas, TX
*Non-conference game. ^{#}Rankings from United Soccer Coaches. (#) Tournament seedings in parentheses. All times are in Eastern Time.
