= List of Livingston F.C. managers =

This is a list of people to manage Livingston F.C. since their change from Meadowbank Thistle in 1995.

The club have had 22 permanent managers with Jim Leishman the only person to manage the club twice.

== Managers ==
As of 1 February 2026

| # | Name and Nationality | From | To | P | W | D | L | Win% | Honours | Manner of departure | Refs |
|---|---|---|---|---|---|---|---|---|---|---|---|
| 1 | (Scotland) Jim Leishman | 1995 | 1997 | 125 | 60 | 35 | 30 | 48.00 | Third Division (1995-96) | | |
| 2 | (Scotland) Ray Stewart | 1 August 1997 | 15 March 2000 | 121 | 61 | 33 | 27 | 50.41 | Second Division (1998-99) | Sacked | |
| 3 | (Scotland) Jim Leishman | 15 March 2000 | 4 June 2003 | 147 | 67 | 32 | 48 | 45.58 | First Division (2000-01) | Became Director of football | |
| 4 | (Brazil) Márcio Máximo | 4 June 2003 | 14 October 2003 | 9 | 3 | 3 | 3 | 33.33 | | Resigned | |
| 5 | (Scotland) David Hay | 15 October 2003 | 1 June 2004 | 39 | 15 | 11 | 13 | 38.46 | League Cup (2003-04) | Contract Expired | |
| 6 | (Scotland) Allan Preston | 4 June 2004 | 25 November 2004 | 18 | 4 | 3 | 11 | 22.22 | | Sacked | |
| - | (Scotland) Alec Cleland | 25 November 2004 | 30 November 2004 | 1 | 1 | 0 | 0 | 100.00 | | Caretaker | |
| 7 | (Scotland) Richard Gough | 30 November 2004 | 22 May 2005 | 25 | 8 | 5 | 12 | 32.00 | | Resigned | |
| 8 | (Scotland) Paul Lambert | 1 June 2005 | 11 February 2006 | 32 | 5 | 7 | 20 | 15.63 | | Resigned | |
| 9 | (Scotland) John Robertson | 15 February 2006 | 15 April 2007 | 49 | 15 | 8 | 26 | 30.61 | | Sacked | (Note: Soccerbase have included two game when club were managed byDavid Bowman.) |
| 10 | (England) Mark Proctor | 22 May 2007 | 3 June 2008 | 43 | 13 | 10 | 20 | 30.23 | | Sacked) | |
| 11 | (Italy) Roberto Landi | 11 June 2008 | 1 December 2008 | 22 | 12 | 1 | 9 | 54.55 | | Sacked | |
| 12 | (Scotland) Paul Hegarty | 5 December 2008 | 27 April 2009 | 19 | 6 | 5 | 8 | 31.58 | | Suspended then contract expired | |
| 13 | (United States) John Murphy | 2 July 2009 | 14 August 2009 | 2 | 0 | 0 | 2 | 0.00 | | Moved back to goalkeeping coach | |
| 14 | (Scotland) Gary Bollan | 14 August 2009 | 5 February 2012 | 108 | 62 | 22 | 24 | 57.41 | Third Division (2009-10); Second Division (2010-11) | Sacked | |
| 15 | (Scotland) John Hughes | 14 February 2012 | 13 November 2012 | 29 | 13 | 5 | 11 | 44.83 | | Became manager of Hartlepool United. | |
| 16 | (England) Gareth Evans | 22 November 2012 | 28 February 2013 | 14 | 6 | 3 | 5 | 42.86 | | Sacked. | |
| 17 | (England) Richie Burke | 28 February 2013 | 12 September 2013 | 16 | 4 | 4 | 8 | 25.00 | | Resigned. | |
| 18 | (Scotland) John McGlynn | 12 September 2013 | 16 December 2014 | 58 | 22 | 9 | 27 | 37.93 | | Left by Mutual Consent. | |
| 19 | (Scotland) Mark Burchill | 16 December 2014 | 21 December 2015 | 45 | 14 | 8 | 23 | 31.11 | 2014-15 Scottish Challenge Cup | Sacked. | |
| 19 | (Scotland) David Hopkin | 22 December 2015 | 31 May 2018 | 96 | 51 | 14 | 31 | 53.13 | 2016-17 Scottish League One | Contract Expired | |
| 20 | (Scotland) Kenny Miller | 30 June 2018 | 23 August 2018 | 7 | 3 | 2 | 2 | 42.86 | | Left by Mutual Consent | |
| 21 | (Scotland) Gary Holt | 23 August 2018 | 26 November 2020 | 94 | 33 | 23 | 38 | 35.11 | | Resigned | |
| 22 | (Scotland) David Martindale | 26 November 2020 | 1 February 2026 | 246 | 93 | 52 | 101 | 37.80 | 2024-25 Scottish Challenge Cup | Moved to Sporting Director | |
| 23 | (England) Marvin Bartley | 1 February 2026 | Present | 1 | 0 | 0 | 1 | 0.00 | | | |

== Caretaker managers ==
| Name | Nationality | From | To | P | W | D | L | Win% | Notes |
|---|---|---|---|---|---|---|---|---|---|
| Gareth Evans | Scotland | 14 November 2012 | 28 February 2013 | 14 | 6 | 3 | 5 | 42.86 | |
| Brian Welsh | Scotland | 5 February 2012 | 14 February 2012 | 1 | 1 | 0 | 0 | 100.00 | |
| David Hay | Scotland | 25 April 2009 | 2 July 2009 | 2 | 0 | 2 | 0 | 0.00 | |
| David Bowman | Scotland | 15 April 2007 | 22 May 2007 | 2 | 0 | 2 | 0 | 0.00 | |
