= 2017 Sun Belt Conference women's soccer tournament =

- Classification: Division I
- Teams: 8
- Matches: 7
- Attendance: 536
- Site: Foley Sports Complex; Foley, Alabama
- Champions: South Alabama (5th title)
- Winning coach: Richard Moodie (1st title)
- Broadcast: ESPN3

2017 Sun Belt Conference women's soccer standings
	Conf.						Overall
Team	W		L		T	PCT	W		L		T	PCT
South Alabama †‡^{y} ‍‍‍	9	–	1	–	0	.900	14	–	6	–	1	.690
Texas State ‍‍‍	8	–	2	–	0	.800	10	–	6	–	1	.618
Troy ‍‍‍	6	–	4	–	0	.600	8	–	10	–	2	.450
Arkansas State ‍‍‍	5	–	4	–	1	.550	9	–	6	–	2	.588
Little Rock ‍‍‍	4	–	4	–	2	.500	9	–	9	–	3	.500
Georgia Southern ‍‍‍	4	–	5	–	1	.450	8	–	9	–	2	.474
Coastal Carolina ‍‍‍	4	–	5	–	1	.450	11	–	8	–	1	.575
Appalachian State ‍‍‍	3	–	5	–	2	.400	4	–	11	–	4	.316
Louisiana–Monroe ‍‍‍	3	–	6	–	1	.350	3	–	13	–	2	.222
Louisiana–Lafayette ‍‍‍	2	–	6	–	2	.300	5	–	10	–	2	.353
Georgia State ‍‍‍	1	–	7	–	2	.200	3	–	11	–	3	.265
† – Conference champion ‡ – 2017 Sun Belt Tournament champion y – Invited to the NCAA tournament As of November 10, 2017; Rankings from United Soccer Coaches Poll; Source:Sun Belt

The 2017 Sun Belt Conference women's soccer tournament was the postseason women's soccer tournament for the Sun Belt Conference held from November 1–5, 2017. The seven-match tournament took place at the Foley Sports Complex in Foley, Alabama. The eight-team single-elimination tournament consisted of three rounds based on seeding from regular season conference play. The defending champions were the South Alabama Jaguars and they successfully defended their title with a 5–0 win over the Coastal Carolina Chanticleers in the final. This was the fifth consecutive and fifth overall Sun Belt women's soccer tournament title for South Alabama and the first for first-year head coach Richard Moodie.

== Bracket ==
Quarterfinals; Wednesday, Nov. 1
1	South Alabama	2
8	Appalachian State	0
4	Arkansas State	1 (1)
5	Little Rock	1 (3)
2	Texas State	1
7	Coastal Carolina	2^{2OT}
3	Troy	1
6	Georgia Southern	2

Semifinals; Friday, Nov. 3
1	South Alabama	4
5	Little Rock	0
7	Coastal Carolina	4
6	Georgia Southern	1

Final; Sunday, Nov. 5
1	South Alabama	5
7	Coastal Carolina	0

== Schedule ==
=== Quarterfinals ===
November 1, 2017	#4 Arkansas State	1–1 (a.e.t.) (1–3 p)	#5 Little Rock	Foley, Alabama
10:00 a.m. CDT	Dana O'Boye 55'	Report	70' Arola Aparicio Gili	Stadium: Foley Sports Complex; Referee: Brian Marshall; Assistant referees: Kayla Polonsky; Michael Smith; Fourth official: Joe Kirkpatrick
	Penalties
	Victoria MacIntosh (penalty missed); Hailey Furio (penalty scored); Dana O'Boye (penalty missed); Sarah Sodoma (penalty missed)		(penalty scored) Liesa Seifert; (penalty scored) Erna Gudjonsdottir; (penalty missed) Morgan Smocovich; (penalty scored) Sairra Tucker

November 1, 2017	#1 South Alabama	2–0	#8 Appalachian State	Foley, Alabama
1:00 p.m. CDT	Ana Helmert 33'; Rio Hardy 44'	Report		Stadium: Foley Sports Complex; Referee: Rebekah Friedrich; Assistant referees: Jon Skinner; Shannon O'Carroll; Fourth official: Griff Sims

November 1, 2017	#2 Texas State	1–2 (a.e.t.)	#7 Coastal Carolina	Foley, Alabama
4:00 p.m. CDT	Kassi Hormuth 5'	Report	71' Lauren Dabner; 105' Mackenzie Gibbs	Stadium: Foley Sports Complex; Referee: Michael Smith; Assistant referees: Tiffini Turpin; Kayla Polonsky; Fourth official: Brian Marshall

November 1, 2017	#3 Troy	1–2	#6 Georgia Southern	Foley, Alabama
7:00 p.m. CDT	Kiersten Edlund 61' (pen.)	Report	Sarah Price 72', 79'	Stadium: Foley Sports Complex; Attendance: 75; Referee: Joe Kirkpatrick; Assistant referees: Shannon O'Carroll; Griff Sims; Fourth official: Rebekah Friedrich

=== Semifinals ===
November 3, 2017	#1 South Alabama	4–0	#5 Little Rock	Foley, Alabama
4:00 p.m. CDT	Rio Hardy 16' (pen.); Kory Dixon 46', 57'; Ana Helmert 84'	Report		Stadium: Foley Sports Complex; Attendance: 173; Referee: Griff Sims; Assistant referees: Shannon O'Carroll; Kayla Polonsky; Fourth official: Michael Smith

November 3, 2017	#7 Coastal Carolina	4–1	#6 Georgia Southern	Foley, Alabama
7:00 p.m. CDT	Kayla Christian 10', 34'; Daniella Famili 34'; Elisabeth Rockhill 69'	Report	90' Aila Sendra	Stadium: Foley Sports Complex; Attendance: 76; Referee: Brian Marshall; Assistant referees: Jennifer Politz; Joe Kirkpatrick; Fourth official: Rebekah Friedrich

=== Final ===
November 5, 2017	#1 South Alabama	5–0	#7 Coastal Carolina	Foley, Alabama
1:00 p.m. CST	Danielle Henley 7'; Kory Dixon 12'; Rio Hardy 19', 88'; Steffi Hardy 54'	Report		Stadium: Foley Sports Complex; Attendance: 212; Referee: Rebekah Friedrich; Assistant referees: Jennifer Politz; Kayla Polonsky; Fourth official: Shannon O'Carroll

== Statistics ==
=== Goalscorers ===
4 Goals

- Rio Hardy - South Alabama

3 Goals

- Kory Dixon - South Alabama

2 Goals

- Kayla Christian - Coastal Carolina
- Ana Helmert - South Alabama
- Sarah Price - Georgia Southern

1 Goal

- Lauren Dabner - Coastal Carolina
- Kiersten Edlund - Troy
- Daniella Famili - Coastal Carolina
- Steffi Hardy - South Alabama
- Danielle Henley - South Alabama
- Kassi Hormuth - Texas State
- Mackenzie Gibbs - Coastal Carolina
- Arola Aparicio Gili - Little Rock
- Dana O'Boye - Arkansas State
- Elisabeth Rockhill - Coastal Carolina
- Aila Sendra - Georgia Southern

== See also ==
- 2017 Sun Belt Conference Men's Soccer Tournament
