= Lee Squires =

English soccer coach

Current position
- Title: Head Coach
- Team: Georgia Southern Eagles
- Conference: Sun Belt

Biographical details
- Born: Sheffield, England
- Education: Lees-McRae College

Playing career
- 2007–2010: Lees-McRae
- 2008: Ocean City Nor'easters
- 2012: SC United Bantams

Coaching career (HC unless noted)
- 2011–2014: Lees-McRae
- 2015–2022: Lander
- 2023–present: Georgia Southern

Head coaching record
- Overall: 142-67-31

Lee Squires is an English-born American college soccer coach. He currently coaches the Georgia Southern Eagles. He is going on his 2nd season as the head coach of Georgia Southern.

== Head coaching record ==
Record table
Season	Team	Overall	Conference	Standing	Postseason
Lees-McRae (Conference Carolinas) (2011–2014)
2011	Lees-McRae	15-6-1	9-2-0		NCAA II Southeast Regional
2012	Lees-McRae	3-11-3	2-6-2		
2013	Lees-McRae	9-7-1	5-3-0		
2014	Lees-McRae	13-5-2	6-3-1		
Lees-McRae:		40-29-7	22-14-3		
Lander (Peach Belt Conference) (2015–2022)
2015	Lander	14-3-2	6-2-1		
2016	Lander	14-4-1	9-0-0		
2017	Lander	13-4-3	6-0-1		
2018	Lander	16-2-3	6-1-0		
2019	Lander	12-5-2	5-2-0		
2020	Lander	8-0-1	8-0-0		
2021	Lander	11-8-0	7-5-0		
2022	Lander	12-3-6	8-1-3		
Lander:		100-29+18	55-11-5		
Georgia Southern (Sun Belt Conference) (2023–present)
2023	Georgia Southern	2-9-6	1-5-3	9th	
Georgia Southern:		2-9-6	1-5-3		
Total:		142-67-31			
National champion Postseason invitational champion Conference regular season champion Conference regular season and conference tournament champion Division regular season champion Division regular season and conference tournament champion Conference tournament champion
