= Hartwick Hawks men's soccer =

American college soccer team

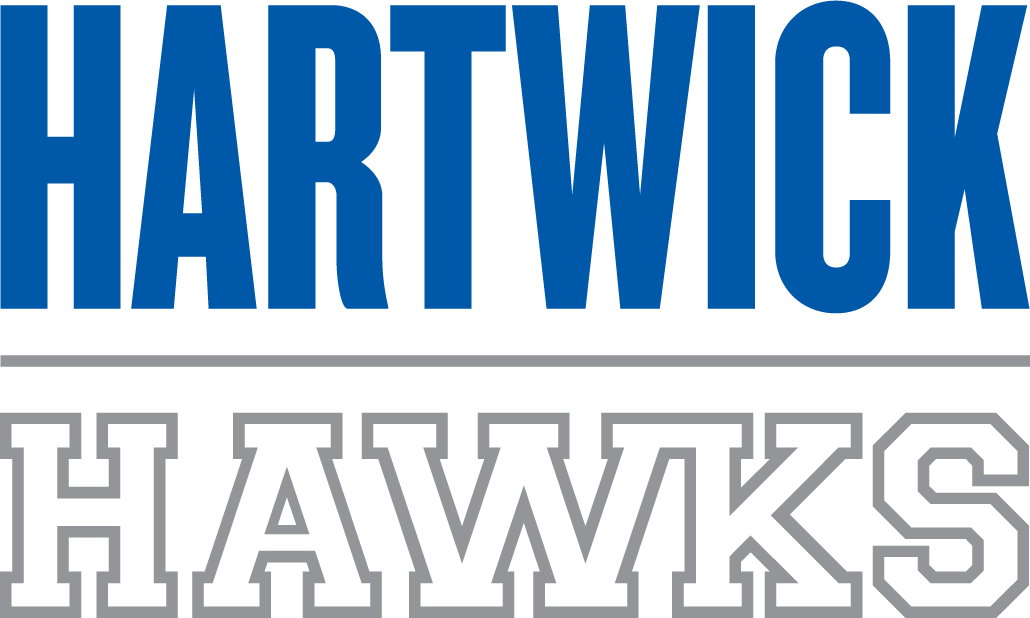
- Founded: 1956; 70 years ago
- University: Hartwick College
- Head coach: John Scott (16th season)
- Conference: Empire 8
- Location: Oneonta, New York, US
- Stadium: Elmore Field (capacity: 3,000)
- Nickname: Hawks
- Colors: Royal blue and white
Home	Away

NCAA tournament championships
- 1977

NCAA tournament College Cup
- 1970, 1974, 1976, 1977, 1980, 1984, 1985

NCAA tournament Quarterfinals
- 1968, 1969, 1970, 1971, 1973, 1974, 1975, 1976, 1977, 1980, 1984, 1985, 1986

NCAA tournament appearances
- 1962, 1964, 1968, 1969, 1970, 1971, 1973, 1974, 1975, 1976, 1977, 1978, 1979, 1980, 1983, 1984, 1985, 1986, 1987, 1989, 1993, 1995, 2005, 2014, 2015 (DI); 1972 (DII)

Conference tournament championships
- 2014, 2015

Conference Regular Season championships
- 2005, 2014, 2015

The Hartwick Hawks men's soccer team represents Hartwick College as member of the Empire 8 at the NCAA Division III level. The Hawks play their home matches on Elmore Field located on the Hartwick campus in Oneonta, New York. The team is coached by John Scott, the seventh head coach in the program's long history. The Hawks were distinguished by being the only Division III program playing Division I men's soccer as an affiliate member of the Sun Belt Conference and by having won the 1977 NCAA Division I soccer tournament. However, on February 28, 2018, Hartwick announced that the men's soccer program would be moving from D1 to D3.

== History ==
Hartwick men's soccer was started by Hal Greig in 1956, three years before the NCAA began sanctioning the sport. Building slowly, Greig headed the program for four years, leading the Hawks to their first two winning seasons.

Greig was succeeded by David Haase, who in seven seasons had five winning teams, two more with .500 records, and led the Hawks to their first two NCAA Men's Soccer Championship tournaments in 1962 and 1964.

Al Miller headed the program for six seasons, leading the Hawks to five NCAA Tournaments, including their first College Cup placing third in 1970. Miller was coach when, in 1972, the NCAA Division II Men's Soccer Championship was begun. Hartwick, along with many other "non-major" schools, moved into the new division. Following that season, Miller was hired away into the ranks of professional soccer.

After only one season in DII, Hartwick and several other of the more prominent DII soccer programs moved back to Division I. Timo Liekoski headed the program for three seasons, gaining three NCAA tournaments, and a second third-place finish in 1974 before he, too, was hired away to the pros.

Liekoski was succeeded by Jim Lennox, who remained at the Hartwick helm for twenty-seven seasons. Under Lennox, the Hawks advanced to thirteen NCAA tournaments, five College Cups, and the 1977 NCAA Championship. By the time Lennox departed Hartwick for the NSCAA, several of the "major" athletic conferences had come to emphasize soccer, and the non-major soccer independents like Hartwick were largely overtaken by big-budget major schools. While Lennox's teams made the NCAA tournament in eleven of his first twelve seasons, they made only three of his last fifteen, including missing during each of his last seven seasons at Hartwick. In 2000, Hartwick left the ranks of the independent schools, joining the Atlantic Soccer Conference (ASC). In 2002, Lennox quit the Hartwick post unexpectedly to become Director of Coaching Education for the National Soccer Coaches Association of America (NSCAA). For his work at Hartwick and the NSCAA, he was named to the NSCAA Hall of Fame in 2013.

Ian McIntyre followed Lennox. His Hawks had five winning seasons in seven years. They won the ASC regular season and tournament titles in 2005, putting Hartwick in the NCAA tournament for the first time in ten years. In 2007, Hartwick became an affiliate member of the Mid-American Conference (MAC).

Hartwick has been coached by John Scott since 2010. In 2013, the MAC eliminated affiliate members, and Hartwick became an affiliate of the Sun Belt Conference, which added men's soccer in 2014 for the first time since 1995. In the first season in the Sun Belt, while having an overall record of only 6–10–4, the Hawks went 3-1-1 in conference competition to win the regular season championship, then won the conference tournament to advance to the NCAA tournament for the first time since 2005. Building on that success, the 2015 Hawks were 11–6–3, repeating as conference champions at 5–0–0, winning their second conference tournament, and earning successive NCAA tournament spots for the first time since 1986–87.

Hartwick was playing Division I men's soccer and awarding athletic scholarships to soccer players before the NCAA initiated the non-scholarship Division III in 1974–75. Several other schools that moved into Division III also were awarding scholarships in ice hockey, lacrosse, or volleyball. These schools (originally nine, now eight) were "grandfathered" into Division I in their one sport as long as they had sport from the other gender (usually a women's program) also in D1 to meet Title IX requirements (Hartwick chose to start a D1 women's polo program, but eliminated the program when it moved the men's soccer program back to D3 in February 2018).

== Players ==
=== Current roster ===
As of July 5, 2022

Note: Flags indicate national team as defined under FIFA eligibility rules; some limited exceptions apply. Players may hold more than one non-FIFA nationality.

No.	Pos.	Nation	Player
1	GK	USA	Jodi Johnson
3	FW	USA	Jake Zona
5	MF	USA	Jimmy Noel
6	MF	USA	Ryan Cooke
7	MF	USA	Matteo Sweet
8	MF	USA	Jim Mahony
10	MF	MEX	Diego Espinola
11	MF	USA	Ethan Kaiser
12	DF	USA	Tyler Muir
13	FW	USA	Peter Crawford
14	DF	USA	Timmy O'Connor

No.	Pos.	Nation	Player
15	MF	USA	Ben Hulbert
16	DF	IND	Ansh Budhwar
18	MF	USA	Drew Crawford
19	FW	USA	Joey Bertone
20	FW	USA	Brady Cummings
22	MF	USA	Zach Craft
23	DF	MEX	Rodrigo Fernandez
24	DF	USA	Nik Heasley
25	DF	MEX	Jose Moreno
30	GK	USA	Jackson Gilstrap

== Titles ==
=== National ===
Championship	#	Season	Score	Rival	Venue
NCAA tournament	1	1977	2–1	San Francisco	California Memorial Stadium

=== Conference ===
Championship	#	Season	Score	Rival	Venue
ASC regular season	1	2005	– (Note: Title awarded by most points earned.)		
Sun Belt tournament	1	2014 (Note: The team also won the regular season.)	1–0	Georgia Southern	Erk Russell Park
Sun Belt tournament	2	2015	2–0	Georgia State	ASU Soccer Stadium

== Record by year ==
Season	Coach	Overall	Conference	Standing	Postseason
Hartwick Hawks (Single division independent) (1956–1971)
1956	Hal Greig	2–3–0			
1957	Hal Greig	3–4–0			
1958	Hal Greig	5–4–0			
1959	Hal Greig	8–1–0			
Hal Greig:		18–12–0 (.600)			
1960	David Haase	4–4–0			
1961	David Haase	8–1–1			
1962	David Haase	10–2–0			NCAA 1st round
1963	David Haase	10–1–0			
1964	David Haase	9–2–0			NCAA 1st round
-1965	David Haase	4–4–1			
1966	David Haase	10–1–1			Atlantic Coast Tournament 2nd
David Haase:		55–15–3 (.774)			
1967	Al Miller	11–1–0			Atlantic Coast Tournament 2nd
1968	Al Miller	9–3–0			NCAA Quarterfinals
1969	Al Miller	10–2–1			NCAA Quarterfinals
1970	Al Miller	14–1–0			NCAA 3rd Place
1971	Al Miller	11–2–1			NCAA Quarterfinals
Hartwick Hawks (Division II independent) (1972–1972)
1972	Al Miller	9–3–1			NCAA DII 2nd round
Al Miller:		64–12–3 (.829)			
Hartwick Hawks (Division I independent) (1973–1999)
1973	Timo Liekoski	9–2–1			NCAA Quarterfinals
1974	Timo Liekoski	10–4–3			NCAA 3rd Place
1975	Timo Liekoski	9–3–1			NCAA 2nd round
Timo Liekoski:		30–9–7 (.728)			
1976	Jim Lennox	16–1–1			NCAA 3rd Place
1977	Jim Lennox	16–0–2			NCAA Champion
1978	Jim Lennox	10–5–1			NCAA 1st round
1979	Jim Lennox	12–3–2			NCAA 2nd round
1980	Jim Lennox	14–7–1			NCAA 4th place
1981	Jim Lennox	10–6–4			ECAC Champions
1982	Jim Lennox	13–5–1			
1983	Jim Lennox	13–4–1			NCAA 2nd round
1984	Jim Lennox	16–5–1			NCAA 3rd Place
1985	Jim Lennox	17–3–1			NCAA 3rd Place
1986	Jim Lennox	13–7–1			NCAA Quarterfinals
1987	Jim Lennox	10–5–4			NCAA 2nd round
1988	Jim Lennox	9–8–2			
1989	Jim Lennox	13–5–2			NCAA 1st round
1990	Jim Lennox	10–7–3			
1991	Jim Lennox	8–10–2			
1992	Jim Lennox	12–5–0			
1993	Jim Lennox	16–4–2			NCAA 2nd round
1994	Jim Lennox	11–5–3			
1995	Jim Lennox	13–2–6			NCAA 2nd round
1996	Jim Lennox	8–12–0			
1997	Jim Lennox	9–8–1			
1998	Jim Lennox	8–10–1			
1999	Jim Lennox	9–9–1			
Hartwick Hawks (Atlantic Soccer Conference) (2000–2006)
2000	Jim Lennox	11–8–1	5–2–1	t-2nd	
2001	Jim Lennox	12–8–0	3–3–0	4th	
2002	Jim Lennox	9–7–3	4–1–0	2nd	
Jim Lennox:		318–163–43 (.648)	12–6–1		
2003	Ian McIntyre	15–2–1	3–1–1	2nd	
2004	Ian McIntyre	13–3–1	4–1–0	2nd	
2005	Ian McIntyre	13–6–1	5–1–0	1st	NCAA 1st round
2006	Ian McIntyre	8–10–2	3–2–1	t-2nd	
Hartwick Hawks (Mid-American Conference) (2006–2013)
2007	Ian McIntyre	5–6–7	2–1–2	3rd	
2008	Ian McIntyre	7–5–7	2–2–2	4th	
2009	Ian McIntyre	10–4–4	3–2–2	2nd	
Ian McIntyre:		71–36–25 (.633)	22–10		
2010	John Scott	2–14–1	1–5–0	7th	
2011	John Scott	5–6–5	1–2–3	5th	
2012	John Scott	5–10–2	2–5–0	7th	
2013	John Scott	5–9–4	3–2–1	3rd	
Hartwick Hawks (Sun Belt Conference) (2014–2017)
2014	John Scott	6–10–4	3–1–1	1st	NCAA 1st round
2015	John Scott	11–6–3	5–0–0	1st	NCAA 1st round
2016	John Scott	9–6–4	2–2–1	4th	
2017	John Scott	7–9–2	2–2–1	4th	
John Scott:		50–70–25 (.431)	17–17–6		
Total:		606–317–106 (.640)	51–33–17		
National champion Postseason invitational champion Conference regular season champion Conference regular season and conference tournament champion Division regular season champion Division regular season and conference tournament champion Conference tournament champion
