= John Murphy (soccer, born 1967) =

American soccer coach

Personal information
- Date of birth: 1967 (age 58–59)
- Place of birth: Quincy, Massachusetts, USA

Youth career
- Years: Team
- 1985–1986: Massasoit Community College

Managerial career
- 1994: Massasoit Community College
- 1995–1998: Brown University (assistant)
- 1998-2000: Assumption University (Head)
- 2000–2003: New England Revolution (assistant)
- 2004: Columbus Crew (assistant)
- 2005–2008: Colorado Rapids (reserve team manager)
- 2009: Livingston
- 2010–2011: Clemson Tigers (assistant)
- Boston College
- 2011–2013: Anderson Trojans
- 2016–2022: Georgia Southern

John Murphy (born 1967) is an American professional soccer coach who is the former head coach of Georgia Southern.

== Early life ==
Murphy's mother, Maureen, is from Glasgow, Scotland.

A native of Quincy, Massachusetts, Murphy earned an associate degree from Massasoit Community College, a bachelor's degree from Bridgewater State University and a degree in applied management from the University of Warwick in conjunction with the League Managers Association.

== Career ==
Murphy spent the majority of his coaching career with college soccer teams in USA, enjoying several state championship victories. He has also had spells in assistant roles with various clubs in the MLS.

The American initially joined Livingston in March 2009 as a goalkeeper coach. Following the departure of David Hay, Murphy was appointed as manager in July 2009 during a time that Livi were facing the possibility of liquidation. After just 42 days in the job, he parted ways with the club as the newly appointed board wished to appoint Gary Bollan as the new manager.

Following his departure from Livi, Murphy returned to America where he held various coaching positions at college soccer teams before being appointed as head coach of Georgia Southern in 2016. After the 2022 season, it was announced Murphy stepped down as head coach.

He was appointed Director of Development & Alumni Relations at Parker College of Business at Georgia Southern University in February 2023. At that time, he was also studying for a Ph.D. in Curriculum Studies at the University.

== Personal life ==
He is married to Erin, together they have three sons – Shay, Eamon and Declan.
