= Appalachian State Mountaineers =

Intercollegiate sports teams of Appalachian State University

- University: Appalachian State University
- Nickname: Mountaineers
- NCAA: Division I (FBS)
- Conference: Sun Belt (primary); MAC (field hockey); SoCon (wrestling)
- Athletic director: Doug Gillin
- Location: Boone, North Carolina
- Varsity teams: 17
- Football stadium: Kidd Brewer Stadium
- Basketball arena: Holmes Center
- Baseball stadium: Jim and Bettie Smith Stadium
- Softball stadium: Sywassink/Lloyd Family Stadium
- Soccer stadium: ASU Soccer Stadium
- Other venues: Varsity Gymnasium
- Colors: Black and gold
- Mascot: Yosef
- Fight song: Hi Hi Yikas
- Website: appstatesports.com
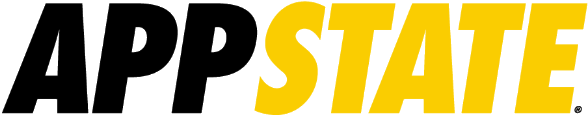

The Appalachian State Mountaineers are the athletic teams that represent Appalachian State University in Boone, North Carolina, United States. The Mountaineers compete in Division I of the National Collegiate Athletic Association (NCAA) and were a member of the Southern Conference (SoCon) between 1972 and 2014. On July 1, 2014, Appalachian State moved to the Sun Belt Conference. Appalachian State fields varsity teams in 17 sports, 7 for men and 10 for women. The football team competes in the Division I Football Bowl Subdivision (FBS), formerly I-A, as a result of the transition to the Sun Belt. The wrestling team remains in the Southern Conference because the Sun Belt does not sponsor the sport. In field hockey, another sport not sponsored by the Sun Belt, Appalachian State joined the Mid-American Conference for the 2017 season after playing two seasons as an independent following the demise of its former league, the Northern Pacific Field Hockey Conference (NorPac). While rivalries exist with Sun Belt west division schools such as Troy and Louisiana, Appalachian State's main Sun Belt rivals are east division members Coastal Carolina and Georgia Southern, as well as rekindled rivalries from the days in FCS with recent Sun Belt additions Marshall and James Madison. Historically, prior to joining the Sun Belt, Western Carolina and Furman were prominent rivalries.

Appalachian State's football program has been successful with the Mountaineers winning three straight national championships in 2005, 2006, and 2007. They are the only team in North Carolina, public or private, to win an NCAA national championship in football. The Mountaineers were the first FCS team to win three straight national championships since the creation of Division I-AA in 1978, and were the first Division I program to win three consecutive national championships since Army accomplished the feat in 1944, 1945, and 1946.

Football home games are played at Kidd Brewer Stadium, while basketball, volleyball, and indoor track and field events are held at the George M. Holmes Convocation Center. The school's baseball team plays at Jim and Bettie Smith Stadium.

== Conference affiliations ==
NCAA

- Carolinas Intercollegiate Athletic Conference (1930–1968)
- Southern Conference (1971–2014)
- Sun Belt Conference (2014–present)

== Sports sponsored ==
Sun Belt Conference logo in App State's colors

| Men's sports | Women's sports |
|---|---|
| Baseball | Basketball |
| Basketball | Cross country |
| Cross country | Field hockey |
| Football | Golf |
| Golf | Soccer |
| Track & field^{1} | Softball |
| Wrestling | Tennis |
| | Track & field^{2} |
| | Volleyball |
^{1} – outdoor only^{2} – includes both indoor and outdoor

=== Baseball ===
Appalachian's first baseball team took the field in 1903. The Mountaineers are coached by Kermit Smith. The Mountaineers won regular season conference titles in 1973, 1984, 1985, 1986, 1987, and 2012. They also won the Southern Conference baseball tournament in 1984 and most recently on May 18, 2012, the Appalachian State Baseball team beat Western Carolina University, becoming Southern Conference baseball champs.

=== Men's basketball ===
The head coach of the Appalachian State men's basketball team is currently Dustin Kerns, previously of the Presbyterian Blue Hose. Notable past coaches include Press Maravich and Bobby Cremins. The Mountaineers have appeared in the NCAA tournament three times, 1979, 2000, and 2021 and appeared in the National Invitation Tournament in 2007. Appalachian State plays all home basketball games at the George M. Holmes Convocation Center, having opened in 2000 to replace Varsity Gymnasium on the campus of Appalachian State University.

=== Women's basketball ===
The Appalachian State women's basketball team, coached by Angel Elderkin, was one of the top teams in the Southern Conference, laying claim to six SoCon tournament titles and six regular season championships in a 26-year span. On February 19, 2011, the Appalachian State Mountaineer women's basketball team won the 2011 Southern Conference regular-season title. The last time they had won the title was 1996. This is a first for Head Coach Darcie Vincent. On May 18, 2012, the Appalachian State baseball team beat Western Carolina University, becoming Southern Conference baseball champions for the first time since 1985.

=== Football ===
The Mountaineers are led by head coach Dowell Loggains. The 2005, 2006, and 2007 seasons were successful, with the Mountaineers winning three consecutive FCS national championships. Before Appalachian left the Southern Conference for the Sun Belt Conference and FBS football in 2014, it had developed intense rivalries with fellow conference members Furman, Georgia Southern, and Western Carolina, The Appalachian–Georgia Southern rivalry continues in FBS, as both teams moved together to the Sun Belt. The Mountaineers and Catamounts played annually for the Old Mountain Jug until Appalachian's departure for the Sun Belt.

The Mountaineers achieved perhaps their biggest win in program history with a road upset of the fifth-ranked Michigan Wolverines, 34–32, on September 1, 2007. With the win Appalachian became the first ever FCS (I-AA) team to defeat an AP nationally ranked FBS (I-A) team. This victory was seen by some analysts to be one of the greatest upsets in NCAA football history. Following the win, they were featured on the cover of the following week's issue of Sports Illustrated.

Numerous players from ASU have gone on to play in the National Football League. They include Harold Alexander, Kerry Brown, Dexter Coakley, Dino Hackett, Larry Hand, Jason Hunter, Dexter Jackson, Corey Lynch, Rico Mack, Marques Murrell, Mark Royals, John Settle, Matt Stevens, Troy Albea, Daniel Wilcox, and Armanti Edwards.

=== Field hockey ===
The women's field hockey team were members of the single-sport Northern Pacific Field Hockey Conference (NorPac) until that league's demise after the 2014 season, playing the next two seasons as a Division I independent, as the Sun Belt does not sponsor this sport. The Mountaineers joined the Mid-American Conference as an affiliate starting in 2017.

=== Wrestling ===
The Mountaineers wrestling team is coached by JohnMark Bentley and holds their home matches in Varsity Gymnasium. Notable former Mountaineer wrestlers include former Olympians – Al Crawford (1948), Herb Singerman (1968), Ike Anderson (1988), and Dale Oliver (1988). Former UFC fighter Tony Gravely also wrestled for the Mountaineers. Austin Trotman, a former NCAA All-American for the Mountaineers in 2012, is the school's career wins leader with 129 wins. The wrestling team are associate members of the Southern Conference, as the Sun Belt Conference does not sponsor wrestling.

=== Other sports ===
The university's cycling team has had success at the regional and national level; they compete within the Atlantic Collegiate Cycling Conference. The team competes in every discipline of bicycle racing that is acknowledged by National Collegiate Cycling Association within USA Cycling. This includes road bicycle racing, Mountain bike racing and Cyclocross.

The team won the Division 2, as established by USA Cycling, collegiate team mountain bike national championships in 2008. They won the Division 2 collegiate team cyclocross national championships in 2008 and 2009. The team is now recognized as a Division 1 team.

== Venues ==
=== Current ===
Kidd Brewer Stadium

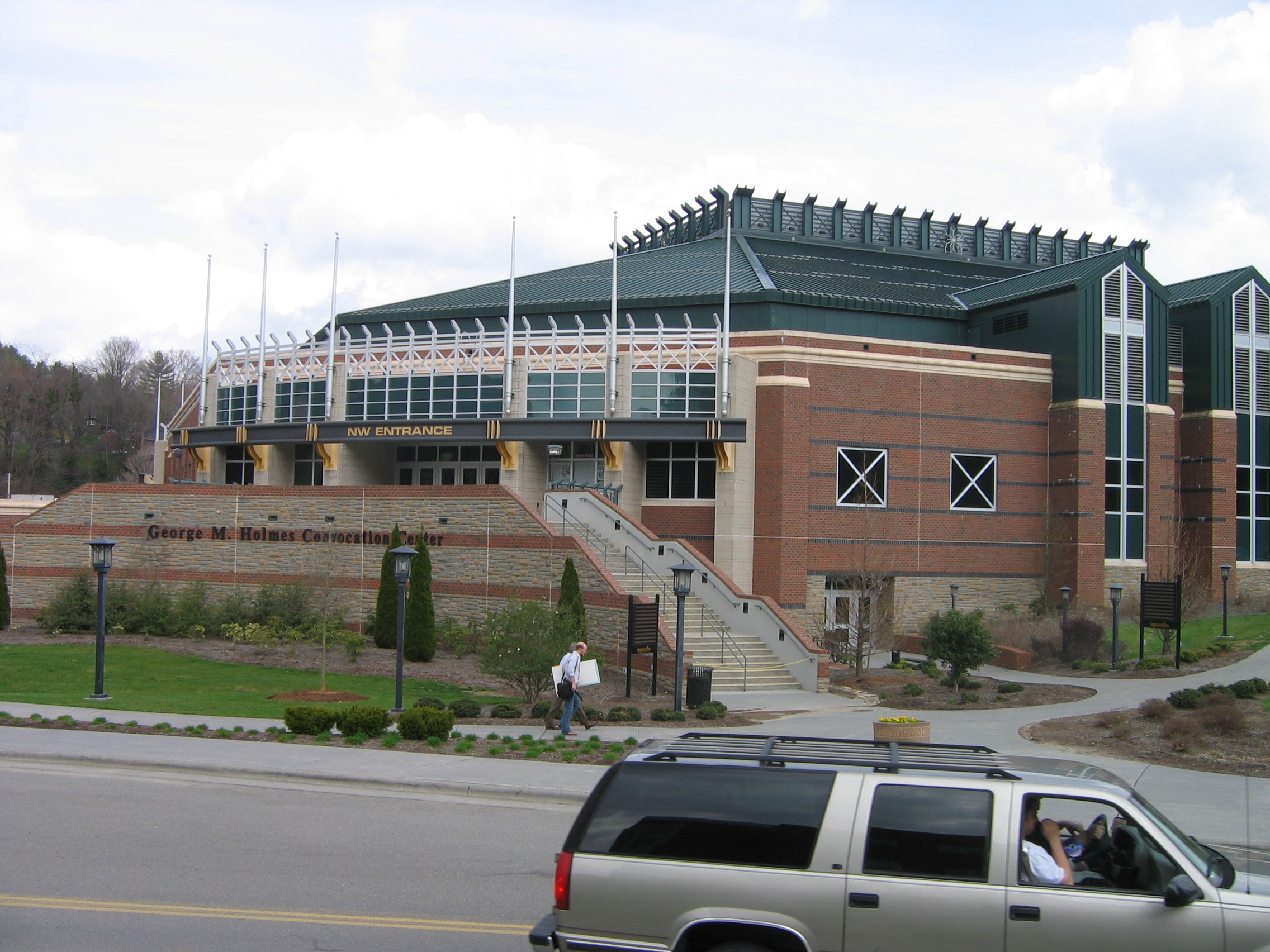
Holmes Center

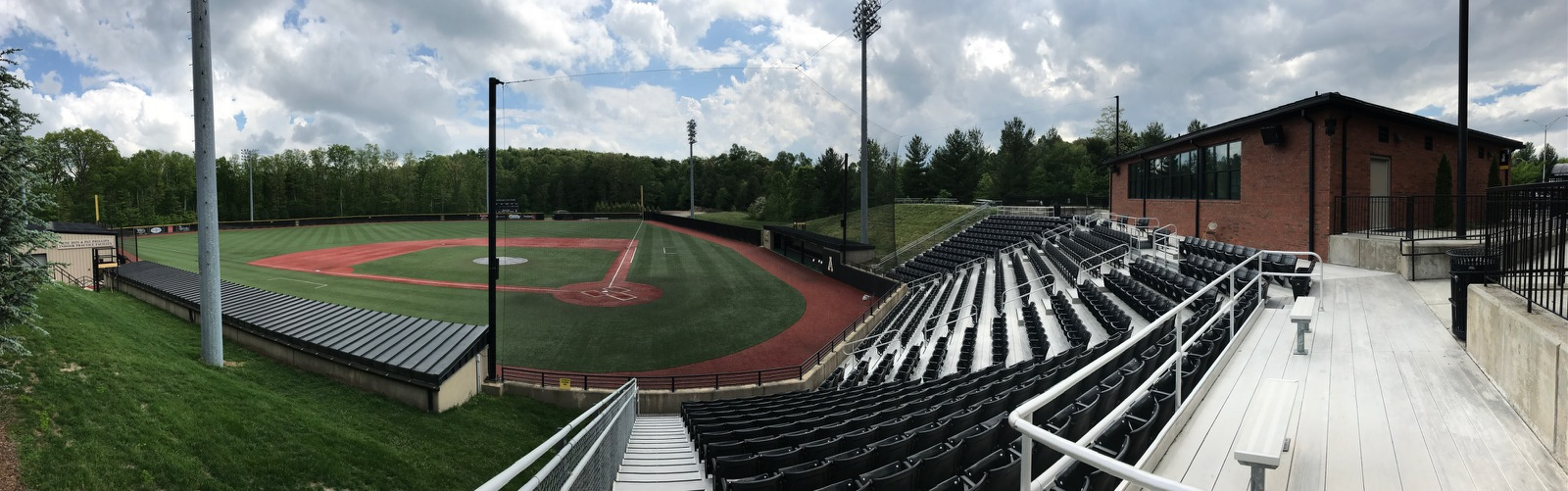
Beaver Field

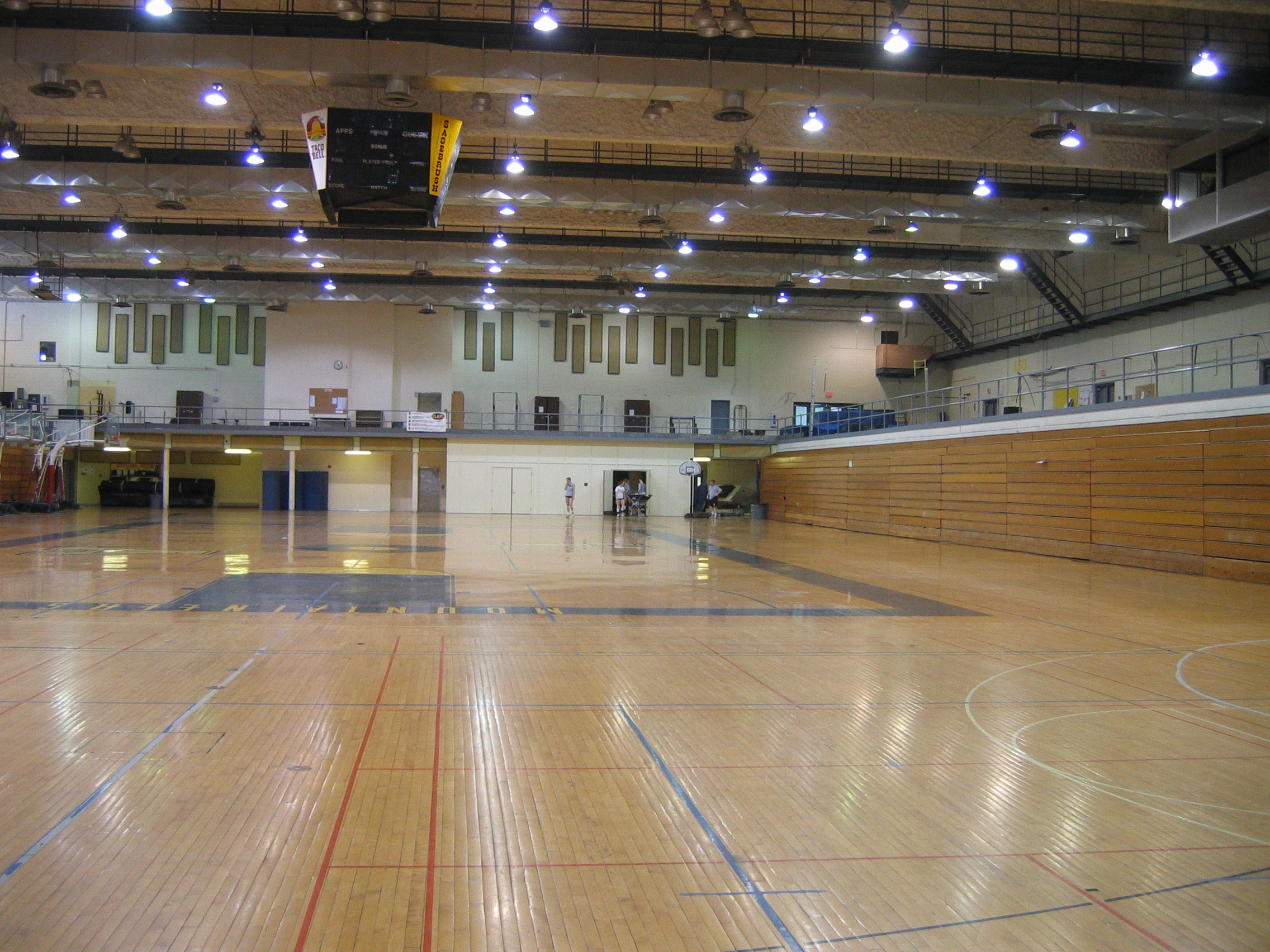
Varsity Gym

| Venue | Sport(s) | Opened | Capacity |
|---|---|---|---|
| Kidd Brewer Stadium | Football | 1960 | 40,168 |
| Holmes Center | Basketball; Volleyball | 2000 | 8,325 |
| Varsity Gymnasium | Wrestling | 1968 | 1,000 |
| Beaver Field | Baseball | 2007 | 1,000 |
| ASU Soccer Stadium | Soccer | 2008 | 1,000 |

=== Former ===
| Venue | Sport(s) | Period | Capacity |
|---|---|---|---|
| Varsity Gymnasium | Basketball; Volleyball; Wrestling | 1968–2000 | 8,000 |
| Lackey Field | Baseball | n/a | n/a |

== Championships ==
=== NCAA team championships ===
Appalachian State has won three NCAA team national championships.

- Men's (3)
  - Football (FCS) (3): 2005, 2006, 2007
- see also:
  - Sun Belt Conference NCAA team championships
  - List of NCAA schools with the most NCAA Division I championships

== Commissioner's and Germann Cup ==
During Appalachian's 43-year tenure in the Southern Conference, the Commissioner's and Germann Cups were awarded each year to the top men's and women's program in the league. The Commissioner's Cup was inaugurated in 1970. The Germann Cup, named for former conference commissioner Ken Germann, was first awarded in 1987. The Apps won the Commissioner's Cup 34 times, more than any other Southern Conference institution.

Commissioner's
1978, 1979, 1980, 1981, 1982, 1984, 1985, 1986, 1987, 1988, 1989, 1990, 1992, 1993, 1994, 1995, 1996, 1997, 1998, 1999, 2000, 2001, 2002, 2003, 2004, 2006, 2007, 2008, 2009, 2010, 2011, 2012, 2013, 2014
34 Cups

Germann
1987, 1988, 1989, 1990, 1991, 1992, 2006, 2007, 2011
9 Cups

== Facilities ==
| Facility | Sport(s) | Capacity |
|---|---|---|
| ASU Soccer Stadium | Soccer | 1,000 |
| Sywassink/Lloyd Family Stadium | Softball | 1,000 |
| Don Kennedy Trails | Cross Country | |
| George M. Holmes Convocation Center | Basketball, Indoor Track and Field, Volleyball | 8,325 |
| Beaver Field at Jim and Bettie Smith Stadium | Baseball | 1,000 |
| Kidd Brewer Stadium | Football | 40,168 |
| Varsity Gymnasium | Wrestling | 1,000 |

== Media ==
Audio and video of games and events can be accessed at the internet home of Appalachian State Mountaineers athletics.

The Appalachian IMG Sports Network is a network of radio stations that can be heard across seven states in the southeast United States.

== Pageantry ==
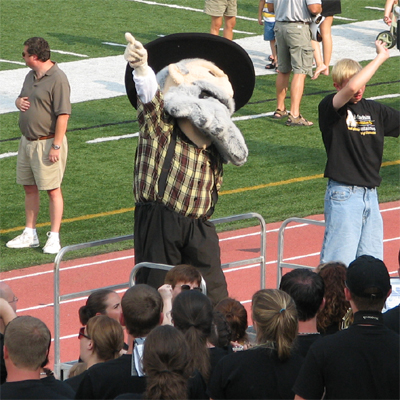
Yosef the Mountaineer

Yosef is the mascot for Appalachian State. The origin of the name Yosef comes from mountain talk for "yourself", the idea being that if you are a fan, friend or alumnus and have a heart of black and gold, you are Yosef. Yosef first appeared in the 1942 edition of The Rhododendron, Appalachian's annual yearbook. He was presented as a member of the freshman class with the name Dan'l Boone Yoseff from Appalachian. The second "f" was dropped from Yoseff in January 1947. Since his inception, Yosef has gone through many appearance changes with the current design being adopted prior to the 1983–84-year. The 2006 football season saw the return of Yosef's rifle which was fired after every Appalachian touchdown.

== Athletic bands ==
The Hayes School of Music provides support for the Mountaineers at all home football games with the Marching Mountaineers, and at all home basketball games with the Appalachian Pep Band. The Marching Mountaineers travel to a select few away games each football season. The director of the athletic bands is Dr. Jason P. Gardner.
