= Appalachian State Mountaineers men's soccer =

American college soccer team

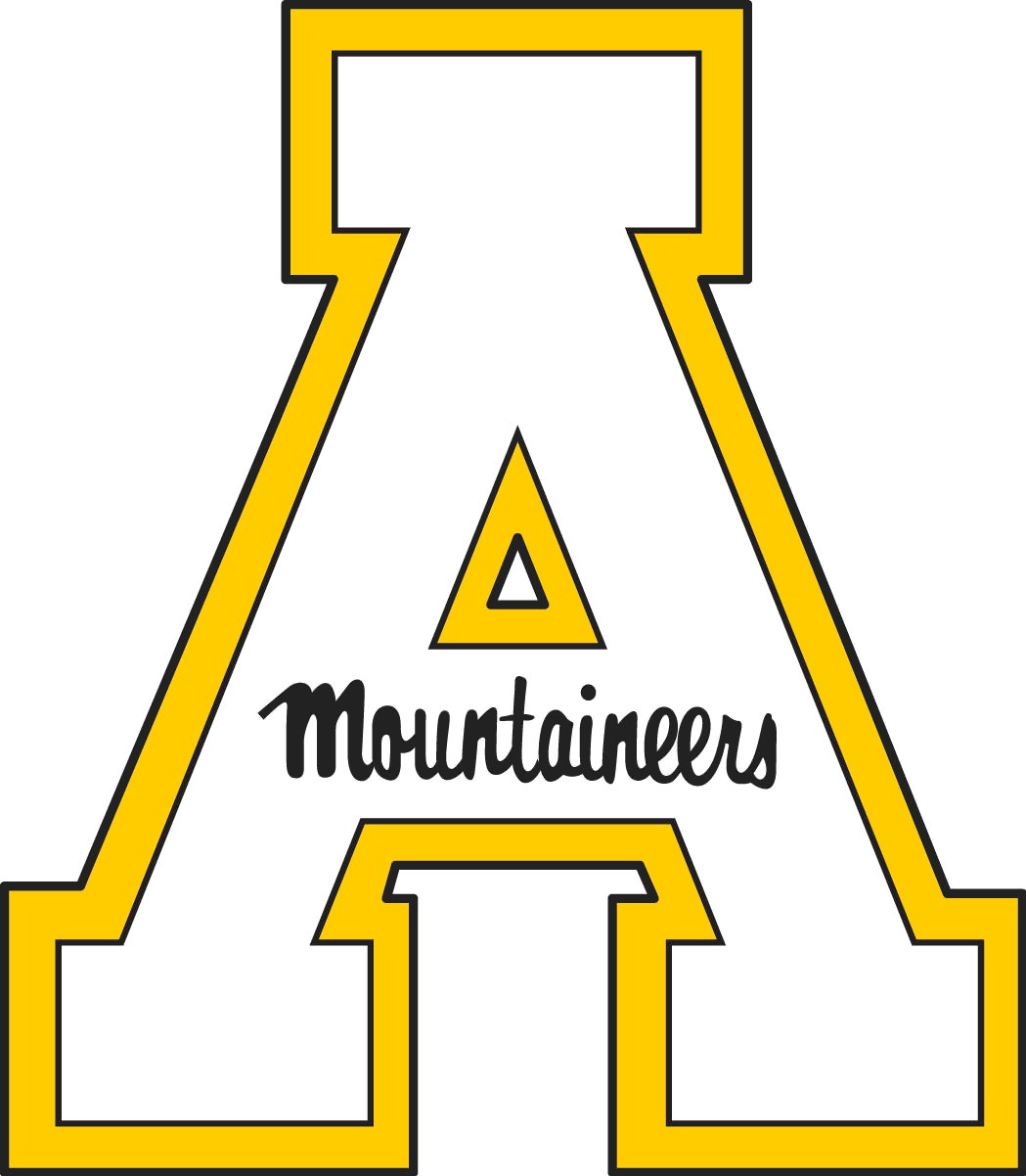
- Founded: 1964
- Folded: 2020; 6 years ago
- University: Appalachian State University
- Head coach: Jason O'Keefe (1st season)
- Conference: Sun Belt
- Location: Boone, North Carolina
- Stadium: ASU Soccer Stadium (capacity: 2,000)
- Nickname: Mountaineers
- Colors: Black and gold
Home

NCAA Tournament Round of 16
- 1977, 1978

NCAA Tournament appearances
- 1975, 1977, 1978, 1980

Conference Tournament championships
- 1990

Conference Regular Season championships
- 1972, 1973, 1974, 1975, 1977, 1979, 1980, 1982, 1984, 1985, 1989

The Appalachian State Mountaineers men's soccer team was an intercollegiate varsity sports team of Appalachian State University. The team was a member of the Sun Belt Conference of the National Collegiate Athletic Association.

== History ==
=== Joining the Sun Belt ===
When Appalachian State announced that it would join the Sun Belt Conference in July 2014, it initially planned to keep its men's soccer and wrestling teams in the Southern Conference, since the Sun Belt then did not sponsor either sport. However, in February 2014, the Sun Belt announced it would reinstate men's soccer beginning in the 2014 season, with three full members (Appalachian State, fellow 2014 arrival Georgia Southern, and Georgia State) joined by three single-sport affiliate members (Hartwick, Howard, and NJIT).

=== Discontinuation of men's soccer ===
In May 2020, Appalachian State cut the men's soccer program due to the financial impact of the COVID-19 pandemic.

As a result of the men's soccer team being cut, head coach Jason O'Keefe and a soccer executive Michael Hitchcock joined up with a group of local business owners to create Appalachian FC, who play in the National Premier Soccer League.

== Notable alumni ==
- (United States) Alec Dufty
- (United States) Mark Schwartz
- (Cuba) Tony Suarez
- (Nigeria) Thompson Usiyan
- (United States) Gregory Walters
