= ASU Soccer Stadium =

Soccer stadium in Boone, North Carolina, US

Coordinates: 36.2254°N 81.6438°W

Appalachian Soccer Stadium
- Interactive map of Appalachian Soccer Stadium
- Full name: Appalachian Soccer Stadium at the Ted Mackorell Soccer Complex
- Address: 574 Brookshire Rd; Boone, North Carolina; United States
- Owner: Appalachian State University
- Operator: Appalachian State Univ. Athletics
- Type: Soccer-specific stadium
- Surface: FieldTurf

Construction
- Opened: 2008; 18 years ago

Tenants
- Appalachian State Mountaineers (NCAA) teams: women's soccer (2008–present); men's soccer (2008–2020); Other teams: Appalachian FC (USL2) (2021–present)

Website
- appstatesports.com/soccer-stadium

The Appalachian Soccer Stadium at the Ted Mackorell Soccer Complex is a soccer-specific stadium in Boone, North Carolina, and is home to the Appalachian State Mountaineers women's soccer team. The stadium, which is part of the Ted Mackorell Soccer Complex, opened for its first game in 2008 against the College of Charleston Cougars.

The stadium is a replacement for the old ASU Soccer Stadium, which was opened in 2005.

In June 2019, Field 2 had new turf installed at a cost of $411,000.
