= Georgia Southern Eagles men's soccer =

American college soccer team

Georgia Southern Eagles
- Founded: May 7, 1980; 45 years ago
- University: Georgia Southern University
- Head coach: Lee Squires (2nd season)
- Conference: Sun Belt
- Location: Statesboro, Georgia, US
- Stadium: Bo Pitts Field (capacity: 3,500)
- Nickname: Eagles
- Colors: Blue and white
Home	Away

Conference Regular Season championships
- 1990, 2016

The Georgia Southern Eagles men's soccer program represents Georgia Southern University in all NCAA Division I men's college soccer competitions. Founded in 1980, the Eagles currently compete in the Sun Belt Conference (SBC). They played briefly as members of the Mid-American Conference. However, following a major conference realignment in 2021 brought several new men's soccer schools to the SBC including the Southeastern Conference and Big 12 Conference playing members, the league announced it would reinstate men's soccer no later than 2023. The reinstatement of SBC men's soccer was ultimately pushed forward to 2022.

The Eagles are coached by Lee Squires. Georgia Southern plays their home matches at Eagle Field.

== History ==
Georgia Southern University's varsity men's soccer program was introduced by then-athletic director George A. Cook on May 7, 1980. The same day, the soccer program's first head coach, Pat Cobb, was also introduced as the head coach. They began play in the league now known as the ASUN Conference.

== Seasons ==
Key

- – National Champions
- – Conference Champions
- – Division Champions
- – NCAA Tournament berth

Season	Head coach	Conference	Season results							Tournament results	
Season	Head coach	Conference	Overall			Conference				Conference	NCAA
Season	Head coach	Conference	W	L	T	W	L	T	Finish	Conference	NCAA
1980	Patt Cobb	TAAC	10	8	1	—	—	—	—	Runners-up	—
1981	Patt Cobb	TAAC	8	10	1	—	—	—	—	Third place	—
1982	Patt Cobb	TAAC	4	10	1	—	—	—	—	Semifinals	—
1983	Ray Wells	TAAC	5	6	1	—	—	—	—	Quarterfinals	—
1984	Ray Wells	TAAC	6	7	0	—	—	—	—	Quarterfinals	—
1985	John Rafter	TAAC	3	9	3	—	—	—	—	Quarterfinals	—
1986	John Rafter	TAAC	12	5	0	—	—	—	—	Semifinals	—
1987	John Rafter	TAAC	14	2	1	—	—	—	—	Semifinals	—
1988	John Rafter	TAAC	10	7	1	—	—	—	—	Quarterfinals	—
1989	John Rafter	TAAC	8	9	1	2	4	0	3rd of 4, East	—	—
1990‡	Tom Norton	TAAC	15	5	0	5	1	0	1st of 4, East	Runners-up	—
1991	Tom Norton	TAAC	4	11	4	1	5	2	6th of 7	—	—
1992	Tom Norton	SoCon	8	10	2	3	3	0	3rd of 7	Quarterfinals	—
1993	Tom Norton	SoCon	8	9	4	2	2	2	3rd of 7	Semifinals	—
1994	Tom Norton	SoCon	10	10	1	2	4	0	4th of 7	Semifinals	—
1995	Tom Norton	SoCon	7	13	2	2	4	0	5th of 7	Semifinals	—
1996	Kevin Chambers	SoCon	10	11	2	3	2	1	3rd of 7	Runners-up	—
1997	Kevin Chambers	SoCon	14	4	2	4	3	0	4th of 8	Semifinals	—
1998	Kevin Chambers	SoCon	6	11	1	4	3	1	4th of 9	Quarterfinals	—
1999	Kevin Chambers	SoCon	5	12	1	3	5	0	6th of 9	Quarterfinals	—
2000	Kevin Chambers	SoCon	6	11	3	2	5	1	6th of 9	Quarterfinals	—
2001	Kevin Chambers	SoCon	8	12	0	3	5	0	7th of 9	Semifinals	—
2002	Kevin Chambers	SoCon	2	16	2	1	5	2	6th of 9	Quarterfinals	—
2003	Kevin Chambers	SoCon	6	11	2	2	4	1	6th of 8	Quarterfinals	—
2004	Kevin Chambers	SoCon	7	7	4	3	3	1	5th of 8	Quarterfinals	—
2005	Kevin Chambers	SoCon	7	10	1	1	6	0	7th of 8	Quarterfinals	—
2006	Kevin Kennedy	SoCon	10	6	3	4	1	2	2nd of 8	Runners-up	—
2007	Kevin Kennedy	SoCon	6	12	0	2	5	0	7th of 8	Quarterfinals	—
2008	Kevin Kennedy	SoCon	8	8	1	4	3	0	4th of 8	Semifinals	—
2009	Kevin Kennedy	SoCon	1	15	1	0	6	0	8th of 8	—	—
2010	Kevin Kennedy	SoCon	3	11	3	0	6	1	8th of 8	Quarterfinals	—
2011	Kevin Kennedy	SoCon	8	8	1	4	3	0	3rd of 8	Quarterfinals	—
2012	Kevin Kennedy	SoCon	6	12	1	3	3	1	4th of 8	Semifinals	—
2013	Kevin Kennedy	SoCon	9	10	0	2	4	0	5th of 7	Semifinals	—
2014	Kevin Kennedy	Sun Belt	8	9	0	3	2	0	2nd of 6	Runners-up	—
2015	Kevin Kennedy	Sun Belt	6	8	2	3	2	0	3rd of 6	Semifinals	—
2016*	John Murphy	Sun Belt	8	8	3	3	1	1	1st of 6*	Semifinals	—
2017	John Murphy	Sun Belt	9	8	1	3	2	0	3rd of 6	Semifinals	—
2018	John Murphy	Sun Belt	7	7	3	2	1	1	2nd of 5	Runners-up	—
2019	John Murphy	Sun Belt	7	9	2	2	3	0	5th of 6	Quarterfinals	—
2020	John Murphy	Sun Belt	1	9	0	0	6	0	4th of 4	Semifinals	—
2021	John Murphy	MAC	4	12	1	0	5	1	7th of 7	—	—
2022	John Murphy	Sun Belt	1	14	1	0	8	0	9th of 9	—	—
2023	Lee Squires	Sun Belt	2	9	6	1	5	3	9th of 10	—	—
2024	Lee Squires	Sun Belt	6	7	4	2	5	2	8th of 10	Quarterfinals	—

== Head coaches ==
There have been eight men's soccer coaches in the program's history.

No.	Coach	Seasons	Years	Games	Record
1	Pat Cobb	3	1980–1982	52	22–28–3 (.443)
2	Ray Wells	2	1983–1984	25	11–13–1 (.460)
3	John Rafter	5	1985–1989	85	47–32–6 (.588)
4	Tom Norton	6	1990–1995	123	52–57–14 (.480)
5	Kevin Chambers	10	1996–2005	194	71–105–18 (.412)
6	Kevin Kennedy	10	2006–2015	176	65–99–12 (.403)
7	John Murphy	7	2016–2022	115	37–67–11 (.370)
8	Lee Squires	2	2023–present	34	8–16–10 (.382)

== Rivalries ==
=== Mercer ===
Mercer leads the series 30–24–1 through the 2023 season.

=== Georgia State ===
Georgia State leads the series 32–11–7 through the 2023 season.
