= 2020 Sun Belt Conference men's soccer season =

- League: NCAA Division I
- Sport: Soccer
- Duration: September 18, 2020 – November 16, 2020
- Teams: 4
- Total attendance: 3,066
- Average attendance: 192

2021 MLS SuperDraft

Regular Season
- Season champions: Coastal Carolina
- Runners-up: Georgia State
- Season MVP: George Proctor, Georgia State
- Top scorer: Tied (3) (5)

Tournament
- Champions: Coastal Carolina
- Runners-up: Georgia State
- Finals MVP: Tor Saunders, Coastal Carolina

Sun Belt Conference men's soccer seasons
- ← 2019 2022 →

The 2020 Sun Belt Conference men's soccer season was the 19th season of men's varsity soccer in the Sun Belt Conference (SBC). The regular season began on September 18 and concluded on November 6, 2020. The season culminated with the Sun Belt Tournament which began on November 13 and concluded on November 15, 2020.

== Background ==
=== Impact of the COVID-19 pandemic on the season ===
The COVID-19 pandemic drastically affected the landscape of men's soccer in the Sun Belt Conference. Long-time program, Appalachian State suspended its men's varsity soccer program in the wake of the pandemic, due to anticipated budget cuts in the athletics program. Additionally, Sun Belt associate member Howard opted out of playing during the fall season due to concerns with the ongoing pandemic.

The SBC and Atlantic Coast Conference were the only two men's soccer conferences that played during fall 2020.

The conference opted to play a six-match season with all programs doing a home-and-home series, or double round robin against every program in the conference. Most teams completed the fall season playing only 8–12 matches instead of the normal 15–18 matches.

=== Discontinuation of men's soccer ===
Appalachian State's decision to drop men's soccer was the first move that led to the discontinuation of SBC men's soccer after the 2020–21 school year. In July 2020, Howard announced that it would become an associate member of the Northeast Conference in six sports, with men's soccer being one of four sports moving in July 2021. This left the SBC with only four men's soccer members, two less than the six required to maintain an automatic NCAA tournament berth. The next move that affected SBC men's soccer came in January 2021, when the ASUN Conference announced three schools as incoming full members, including SBC associate Central Arkansas. The following month saw Coastal Carolina announce that it would become a single-sport member of Conference USA (C-USA), joining another in-state C-USA associate in South Carolina. This left Georgia Southern and Georgia State as the only remaining Sun Belt men's soccer programs, and those two schools announced they would move that sport to the Mid-American Conference in late May 2021.

=== Return of Sun Belt men's soccer ===
A major conference realignment initially triggered in July 2021 when Oklahoma and Texas announced their plans to leave the Big 12 Conference for the Southeastern Conference eventually led to the reinstatement of Sun Belt men's soccer. Further moves in this realignment cycle saw three men's soccer schools announce that they would join the SBC no later than 2023: Colonial Athletic Association member James Madison, and then-reigning national champion Marshall and Old Dominion from Conference USA. Accordingly, league commissioner Keith Gill announced on November 1, 2021 that SBC men's soccer would be reinstated no later than 2023.

Later developments in the realignment cycle led the SBC to reinstate men's soccer in 2022 instead of 2023.

== Teams ==
=== Stadiums and locations ===
Team	Location	Stadium	Capacity
Central Arkansas Bears	Conway, Arkansas	Bill Stephens Track/Soccer Complex	1,000
Coastal Carolina Chanticleers	Conway, South Carolina	Coastal Carolina University Soccer Field	1,000
Georgia Southern Eagles	Statesboro, Georgia	Eagle Field	3,500
Georgia State Panthers	Decatur, Georgia	GSU Soccer Complex	1,892
Georgia State Panthers	Atlanta	Center Parc Stadium	24,333

== Head coaches ==
As of the 2019 season

Team	Head coach	Previous job	Years at school	Overall record	Record at school	Sun Belt record	NCAA Tournaments	NCAA College Cups	NCAA Titles	Ref.
Central Arkansas	Ross Duncan	Vermont (asst.)	9	33–66–9 (.347)	33–66–9 (.347)	13–25–6 (.364)	2	0	0	
Coastal Carolina	Shaun Docking	Charleston Southern	22	296–144–37 (.659)	276–125–35 (.673)	9–4–1 (.679)	13	0	0	
Georgia Southern	John Murphy	Anderson (SC)	4	90–67–22 (.564)	24–23–7 (.509)	8–4–2 (.643)	0	0	0	
Georgia State	Brett Surrency	Jacksonville (asst.)	10	89–75–12 (.540)	89–75–12 (.540)	15–6–3 (.688)	2	0	0	
Howard	Phillip Gyau	St. John's College High School	6	8–72–13 (.156)	8–72–13 (.156)	2–19–3 (.146)	0	0	0	

== Preseason ==
=== Preseason poll ===
The preseason poll was released on August 27, 2020.

	Team ranking	Points	First place votes
1.	Central Arkansas	12	1
2.	Coastal Carolina	10	1
2.	Georgia State	10	1
4.	Georgia Southern	8	1

=== Preseason national polls ===
Due to the ongoing COVID-19 pandemic, only College Soccer News released a preseason poll.

	United; Soccer	CSN	SoccerAmerica	Top DrawerSoccer
Central Arkansas	N/A	—	N/A	N/A
Coastal Carolina	N/A	RV	N/A	N/A
Georgia Southern	N/A	—	N/A	N/A
Georgia State	N/A	—	N/A	N/A

=== Preseason honors ===
Defensive Player – Preseason All-Conference

- Alberto Suarez, Central Arkansas

Offensive Player – Preseason All-Conference

- Aris Briggs, Georgia State

Preseason All-Conference Team
Position	Nat.	Player	Team
FW	USA	Aris Briggs	Georgia State
FW	ENG	Adam Davie	Georgia Southern
FW	ITA	Claudio Repetto	Coastal Carolina
MF	DEN	Soren Jenson	Central Arkansas
MF	ENG	Matthew Fearnley	Georgia State
MF	SCO	Ross Finnie	Georgia State
DF	ESP	Alberto Suárez	Central Arkansas
DF	MEX	Aldair Cortes	Georgia Southern
DF	ITA	Edoardo Calzola	Central Arkansas
GK	ENG	Paul Tyson	Georgia State
GK	BRA	Jose Eduardo Bomfim	Georgia Southern

== Regular season ==
=== Conference results ===
2020 Sun Belt Conference men's soccer standings
	Conf.					Overall
Team	W		L		T	W		L		T
No. 23 Coastal Carolina ‡	5	–	1	–	0	6	–	2	–	1
Georgia State	4	–	2	–	0	9	–	2	–	2
Central Arkansas	3	–	3	–	0	4	–	6	–	2
Georgia Southern	0	–	6	–	0	1	–	9	–	0
‡ – 2020 Sun Belt Tournament Champion + – Also invited to the 2020 NCAA tournament Note: † Due to COVID-19, Howard has suspended the 2020 men's soccer season.; As of March 2, 2021; Rankings from United Soccer Coaches

2020 Sun Belt Conference men's spring soccer standings
	Conf.					Overall
Team	W		L		T	W		L		T
#24 Coastal Carolina ‡	5	–	1	–	0	9	–	4	–	2
Georgia State	4	–	2	–	0	9	–	2	–	2
Central Arkansas	3	–	3	–	0	6	–	9	–	2
Georgia Southern	0	–	6	–	0	1	–	9	–	0
‡ – 2020 Sun Belt Tournament Champion + – Also invited to the 2020 NCAA tournament Note: † Due to COVID-19, Howard suspended the 2020 men's soccer season.; As of May 28, Rankings from United Soccer Coaches

For the 2020 season, each team plays every other conference team twice; once home and once away.

Home \ Away	UCA	CCU	GSO	GSU
Central Arkansas	—	2–3	1–0	2–0
Coastal Carolina	1–0	—	2–1	1–0
Georgia Southern	1–4	0–3	—	0–3
Georgia State	1–0	2–0	2–0	—

Source: Sun Belt Conference
Legend: Blue = home team win; Yellow = draw; Red = away team win.
For upcoming matches, an "a" indicates there is an article about the rivalry between the two participants.

=== Weekly results ===
Legend

Index to colors and formatting
SBC member won
SBC member lost
SBC member tied
SBC teams in **bold**

All times Eastern time.

==== Week 1 (Sep. 14 – Sept. 20) ====
Date	Time (ET)	Visiting team	Home team	Site	Result	Attendance
September 18	7:00 p.m.	**Georgia State**	Mercer	Bear Field • Macon, GA	**W** 2–1	161
September 19	5:00 p.m.	UAB	**Central Arkansas**	Bill Stephens Soccer Complex • Conway, AR	**L** 2–3	105
September 19	7:00 p.m.	**Georgia Southern**	South Carolina	Eugene Stone Stadium • Columbia, SC	**L** 0–2	320

==== Week 2 (Sep. 21 – Sept. 27) ====
Date	Time (ET)	Visiting team	Home team	Site	Result	Attendance
September 22	7:00 p.m.	**Georgia Southern**	Mercer	Betts Stadium • Macon, GA	**L** 0–3	161
September 24	7:00 p.m.	**Georgia State**	South Carolina	Stone Soccer Stadium • Columbia, SC	**W** 3–1	320
September 26	6:00 p.m.	UAB	**Georgia Southern**	Eagle Field • Statesboro, GA	**W** 3–2	266

==== Week 3 (Sep. 28 – Oct. 4) ====
Date	Time (ET)	Visiting team	Home team	Site	Result	Attendance
September 30	5:00 p.m.	UAB	**Georgia State**	Center Parc Stadium • Atlanta, GA	**W** 4–0	214
October 2	2:00 p.m.	**Central Arkansas**	Kentucky	Bell Soccer Complex • Lexington, KY	**L** 1–2 (OT)	83
October 4	2:00 p.m.	**Georgia Southern**	**Georgia State**	GSU Soccer Field • Atlanta, GA	**GSU** 2–0	377

==== Week 4 (Oct. 5 – Oct. 11) ====
Date	Time (ET)	Visiting team	Home team	Site	Result	Attendance
October 6	7:00 p.m.	Mercer	**Georgia State**	GSU Soccer Field • Atlanta, GA	**W** 2–0	298
October 10	1:00 p.m.	**Georgia State**	**Coastal Carolina**	CCU Soccer Field • Conway, SC	**CCU** 1–0	150
October 10	7:00 p.m.	**Central Arkansas**	**Georgia Southern**	Eagle Field • Statesboro, GA	**UCA** 4–1	233

==== Week 5 (Oct. 12 – Oct. 18) ====
Date	Time (ET)	Visiting team	Home team	Site	Result	Attendance
October 13	8:00 p.m.	**Georgia State**	UAB	BBVA Field • Birmingham, AL	**W** 4–1	195
October 16	2:00 p.m.	**Central Arkansas**	**Coastal Carolina**	GSU Soccer Field • Atlanta, GA	**CCU** 3–2	50
October 16	7:00 p.m.	**Georgia State**	**Georgia Southern**	Eagle Field • Statesboro, GA	**GSU** 3–0	273
October 18	1:00 p.m.	**Coastal Carolina**	**Central Arkansas**	GSU Soccer Field • Atlanta, GA	**CCU** 1–0 (OT)	62

==== Week 6 (Oct. 19 – Oct. 25) ====
Date	Time (ET)	Visiting team	Home team	Site	Result	Attendance
October 24	2:00 p.m.	**Georgia State**	**Central Arkansas**	Bill Stephens Soccer Complex • Conway, AR	**UCA** 2–0	84
October 25	2:00 p.m.	**Coastal Carolina**	**Georgia Southern**	Eagle Field • Statesboro, GA	**CCU** 2–1 (OT)	150

==== Week 7 (Oct. 26 – Nov. 1) ====
Date	Time (ET)	Visiting team	Home team	Site	Result	Attendance
October 31	2:00 p.m.	**Georgia Southern**	**Central Arkansas**	Bill Stephens Soccer Complex • Conway, AR	**UCA** 1–0	96
November 1	2:00 p.m.	**Coastal Carolina**	**Georgia State**	GSU Soccer Field • Atlanta, GA	**GSU** 2–0	223

==== Week 8 (Nov. 2 – Nov. 8) ====
Date	Time (ET)	Visiting team	Home team	Site	Result	Attendance
November 6	12:00 p.m.	**Central Arkansas**	**Georgia State**	GSU Soccer Field • Atlanta, GA	**GSU** 1–0	194
November 6	6:00 p.m.	**Coastal Carolina**	**Georgia Southern**	Eagle Field • Statesboro, GA	**CCU** 3–0	291

=== Players of the Week honors ===
Week	Offensive			Defensive			Ref.
Week	Player	Position	Team	Player	Position	Team	Ref.
Sep. 23	Aris Briggs	FW	Georgia State	Paul Tyson	GK	Georgia State	
Sep. 30	Matthew Fearnley	MF	Georgia State	George Proctor	DF	Georgia State	
Oct. 7	Aris Briggs	FW	Georgia State	Gunther Rankenburg	GK	Georgia State	
Oct. 14	Soren Jensen	MF	Central Arkansas	Tor Saunders	GK	Coastal Carolina	
Oct. 21	Andrew Bennett	MF	Georgia State	Tor Saunders	GK	Coastal Carolina	
Oct. 28	Soren Jensen	MF	Central Arkansas	Zach Schawl	GK	Central Arkansas	
Oct. 28	Ethan Hackenberg	FW	Coastal Carolina	Zach Schawl	GK	Central Arkansas	
Nov. 4	Matthew Fearnley	MF	Georgia State	George Proctor	DF	Georgia State	
Nov. 10	Marcello Jones	MF	Coastal Carolina	George Proctor	DF	Georgia State	

== Postseason ==
=== Sun Belt Tournament ===
All four teams qualified for the modified Sun Belt Conference Men's Soccer Tournament. The tournament was played from November 13–15, with Coastal Carolina winning the championship in penalties over Georgia State.

Semifinals
1	Coastal Carolina	6
4	Georgia Southern	0
2	Georgia State (pen.)	1 (4)
3	Central Arkansas	1 (2)

Finals
1	Coastal Carolina (pen.)	0 (4)
2	Georgia State	0 (3)

=== NCAA Tournament ===
The winner of the 2020 SBC Tournament will earn an automatic berth into the 2020 NCAA Division I Men's Soccer Tournament. Due to the COVID-19 pandemic, the tournament was postponed from November/December 2020 to April/May 2021.

Seed	School	2nd Round	3rd Round	Quarterfinals	Semifinals	Championship
—N/a	Coastal Carolina	L, 2–3 vs. (5) Wake Forest				

=== Postseason awards and honors ===
2020 Sun Belt Conference Men's Soccer Individual Awards
Award	Recipient(s)
Player of the Year	George Proctor, Georgia State
Offensive Player of the Year	Aris Briggs, Georgia State
Newcomer of the Year	Tor Saunders, Coastal Carolina
Freshman of the Year	Jason Kemble, Coastal Carolina
Coach of the Year	Shaun Docking, Coastal Carolina

2020 Sun Belt Men's Soccer All-Conference Team

Aris Briggs, Georgia State (F)
Adam Davie, Georgia Southern (F)
Kasper Andersen, Central Ark. (F)
Matthew Fearnley, Georgia State (MF)
Soren Jensen, Central Ark. (MF)
Marcello Jones, Coastal Carolina (MF)
Ross Finnie, Georgia State (MF)
George Proctor, Georgia State (D)
Alberto Suarez, Central Ark. (D)
Mael Couteau, Coastal Carolina (D)
Ramon Munoz, Georgia State (D)
Tor Saunders, Coastal Carolina (GK)
Paul Tyson, Georgia State (GK)

== MLS SuperDraft ==
The 2021 MLS SuperDraft will be held in January 2021.

=== Total picks by school ===
Team	Round 1	Round 2	Round 3	Comp.	Total
Central Arkansas	0	0	0	0	0
Coastal Carolina	0	0	1	0	1
Georgia State	0	0	1	0	1
Georgia Southern	0	0	0	0	0
Howard	0	0	0	0	0
Total	0	0	2	0	2

=== List of selections ===
Round	Pick #	MLS team	Player	Position	College	Ref.
3	61	Real Salt Lake	Aris Briggs	FW	Georgia State	
3	74	Nashville SC	Tor Saunders	GK	Coastal Carolina	

=== Notable undrafted players ===
The following players went pro after the 2020 season despite not getting drafted in the 2021 MLS draft.

Player	Nationality	Position	College	Team	League
