= 2023 Miami FC season =

Miami FC
2023 season
- Owner: Riccardo Silva
- CEO: Michael Williamson
- Head coach: Anthony Pulis (until June 20); Lewis Neal (from June 20)
- Stadium: Riccardo Silva Stadium; Miami, Florida
- USL Championship: Eastern Conf.: 9th Overall: 20th
- Playoffs: DNQ
- U.S. Open Cup: Third Round
- Top goalscorer: League: Joaquín Rivas (10); All: Joaquín Rivas (10)
- Highest home attendance: League: 2,235 (Sept. 30 vs. HFD); All: 12,099 (Apr. 26 vs. IMCF)
- Lowest home attendance: League: 1,007 (Sept. 20 vs. LOU); All: 654 (Apr. 4 vs. JAX)
- Average home league attendance: League: 1,432; All: 1,952
- Biggest win: MIA 4–0 ELP (Aug. 5)
- Biggest defeat: MEM 5–1 MIA (June 3)

The 2023 Miami FC season was the club's fourth season in the USL Championship, the second-tier of American soccer, and ninth overall.

== Roster ==
As of October 14, 2023

Appearances and goals are career totals from all-competitions and leagues.

| No. | Name | Nationality | Position | Date of birth (age) | Signed from | Signed in | Contract ends | Apps. | Goals |
Goalkeepers
| 1 | Jake McGuire | (United States) | GK | September 3, 1994 (age 32) | North Carolina FC | 2022 | | 25 | 0 |
| 13 | Adrian Zendejas | (United States) | GK | August 30, 1995 (age 31) | loan from Charlotte FC | 2023 | 2023 | 23 | 0 |
Defenders
| 3 | Aedan Stanley | (United States) | DF | December 13, 1999 (age 26) | Austin FC | 2022 | | 69 | 0 |
| 4 | Paco Craig | (England) | DF | October 19, 1992 (age 34) | (England) Wycombe Wanderers F.C. | 2021 | 2024+ | 96 | 6 |
| 5 | Callum Chapman-Page | (England) | DF | November 6, 1995 (age 31) | FC Tulsa | 2021 | | 73 | 6 |
| 6 | Moisés Hernández | (Guatemala) | DF | March 5, 1992 (age 34) | (Guatemala) C.S.D. Municipal | 2023 | 2024+ | 21 | 0 |
| 22 | Benjamin Ofeimu | (United States) | DF | September 30, 2000 (age 26) | Birmingham Legion FC | 2022 | 2024+ | 40 | 1 |
| 23 | Curtis Thorn | (England) | DF | December 2, 1995 (age 30) | Tormenta FC | 2022 | 2024+ | 18 | 0 |
| 77 | Gustavo Rissi | (Brazil) | DF | February 4, 1998 (age 28) | loan from Indy Eleven | 2023 | 2023 | 1 | 0 |
Midfielders
| 8 | Gabriel Cabral | (Brazil) | MF | April 29, 1997 (age 29) | Tormenta FC | 2022 | 2024+ | 22 | 2 |
| 10 | Florian Valot | (France) | MF | February 12, 1993 (age 33) | FC Cincinnati | 2022 | 2023 | 63 | 7 |
| 14 | Ryan Telfer | (Trinidad and Tobago) | MF | March 4, 1994 (age 32) | Columbus Crew 2 | 2023 | 2024+ | 30 | 5 |
| 15 | Lorenzo Di Mercurio | (United States) | MF | April 8, 2003 (age 23) | Miami FC Academy | 2023 | | 2 | 0 |
| 18 | Dennis Dowouna | (Ghana) | MF | May 18, 2000 (age 26) | (Albania) KF Skënderbeu Korçë | 2022 | 2023 | 27 | 1 |
| 20 | Ben Mines | (United States) | MF | May 13, 2000 (age 26) | FC Cincinnati | 2022 | 2024+ | 23 | 1 |
| 21 | Bolu Akinyode | (Nigeria) | MF | May 30, 1994 (age 32) | Birmingham Legion FC | 2021 | | 98 | 2 |
| 30 | Christopher Jean-Francois | (United States) | MF | November 1, 2005 (age 21) | Miami FC Academy | 2023 | 2023 | 0 | 0 |
Forwards
| 7 | Claudio Repetto | (Italy) | FW | February 2, 1997 (age 29) | Phoenix Rising FC | 2022 | | 34 | 5 |
| 9 | Kyle Murphy | (United States) | FW | December 11, 1992 (age 33) | Memphis 901 FC | 2022 | | 66 | 17 |
| 11 | Joaquín Rivas | (El Salvador) | FW | April 26, 1992 (age 34) | FC Tulsa | 2022 | | 44 | 15 |
| 17 | Michael Salazar | (Belize) | FW | December 15, 1992 (age 33) | LA Galaxy II | 2023 | 2024+ | 34 | 2 |
| 19 | Michael Lawrence | (United States) | FW | July 10, 1999 (age 27) | Nova Southeastern Sharks | 2023 | | 4 | 0 |
| 99 | Christian Sorto | (El Salvador) | FW | January 19, 2000 (age 26) | Rio Grande Valley FC | 2022 | 2023 | 61 | 8 |

=== Staff ===
- (England) Lewis Neal – Interim head coach
- (Brazil) Marcello Alves – Interim assistant coach
- (United States) Ryan Thamm – Head of Performance
- (Italy) Giuseppe Weller – Goalkeeper coach
- (United States) Keeler Watson – Equipment manager

== Transfers ==
=== In ===
| # | Pos. | Player | Signed from | Details | Date | Source |
|---|---|---|---|---|---|---|
| 8 | MF | (Brazil) Gabriel Cabral | (United States) Tormenta FC | Free transfer, Multi-year | December 19, 2022 | |
| 23 | DF | (England) Curtis Thorn | (United States) Tormenta FC | Free transfer, Multi-year | December 23, 2022 | |
| 20 | MF | (United States) Ben Mines | (United States) FC Cincinnati | Free transfer, Multi-year | December 29, 2022 | |
| 17 | FW | (Belize) Michael Salazar | (United States) LA Galaxy II | Free transfer, Multi-year | January 3, 2023 | |
| 14 | MF | (Trinidad and Tobago) Ryan Telfer | (United States) Columbus Crew 2 | Free transfer, Multi-year | January 5, 2023 | |
| 6 | DF | (Guatemala) Moisés Hernández | (Guatemala) C.S.D. Municipal | Free transfer, Multi-year | January 19, 2023 | |
| 19 | FW | (United States) Michael Lawrence | (United States) Nova Southeastern Sharks | Free transfer | April 20, 2023 | |
| 15 | FW | (United States) Lorenzo Di Mercurio | (United States) Miami FC Academy | Free transfer | April 25, 2023 | |
| 30 | MF | (United States) Christopher Jean-Francois | (United States) Miami FC Academy | Free transfer, Remainder of season | September 6, 2023 | |

=== Out ===
| # | Pos. | Player | Signed to | Details | Date | Source |
|---|---|---|---|---|---|---|
| 27 | FW | (Jamaica) Romeo Parkes | Unattached | Not re-signed | November 2022 | |
| 3 | DF | (Italy) Luca Antonelli | Retired | | November 10, 2022 | |
| 80 | MF | (Jamaica) Devon Williams | (United States) Colorado Springs Switchbacks FC | Not re-signed | November 2022 (Joined new team December 23, 2022) | |
| 24 | GK | (United States) Connor Sparrow | (United States) Tampa Bay Rowdies | Not re-signed | November 2022 (Joined new team December 23, 2022) | |
| 11 | FW | (United States) Richard Ballard | (United States) Detroit City FC | Not re-signed | November 2022 (Joined new team January 10, 2023) | |
| 18 | MF | (Colombia) Junior Palacios | (United States) Union Omaha | Not re-signed | November 2022 (Joined new team January 31, 2023) | |
| 30 | FW | (Canada) Adonijah Reid | (Canada) Pacific FC | Not re-signed | November 2022 (Joined new team January 31, 2023) | |
| 7 | FW | (El Salvador) Joshua Pérez | (Italy) Montevarchi Calcio Aquila 1902 | Not re-signed | November 2022 (Joined new team February 8, 2023) | |
| 13 | FW | (Jamaica) Lamar Walker | (Jamaica) Portmore United F.C. | Not re-signed | November 2022 (Joined new team February 19, 2023) | |
| 98 | FW | (United States) Pierre da Silva | (United States) Forward Madison FC | Not re-signed | November 2022 (Joined new team August 7, 2023) | |
| 31 | GK | (England) Noah Abrams | Retired | On loan at time of departure | September 6, 2023 | |
| 2 | DF | (United States) Mark Segbers | (United States) Charleston Battery | Undisclosed transfer | September 22, 2023 | |

=== Loan in ===
| # | Pos. | Player | Loaned from | Details | Date | Source |
|---|---|---|---|---|---|---|
| 13 | GK | (United States) Adrian Zendejas | (United States) Charlotte FC | Season-long | January 17, 2023 | |
| 77 | DF | (Brazil) Gustavo Rissi | (United States) Indy Eleven | Remainder of season | July 21, 2023 | |

=== Loan out ===
| # | Pos. | Player | Loaned to | Details | Date | Source |
|---|---|---|---|---|---|---|
| 31 | GK | (England) Noah Abrams | (United States) Charlotte Independence | Season-long, retired while on loan | March 15, 2023 | |
| 5 | DF | (England) Callum Chapman-Page | (United States) Indy Eleven | Remainder of season | July 21, 2023 | |

== Friendlies ==
| February 11 Preseason | Miami FC | 2–1 | Orlando City B | University Park, Florida |
| 1:55 PM EST | Repetto; Telfer | Report | Goal | Stadium: FIU Intramural Field |
Note: Start time, location, and final score disseminated from social media posts

| February 15 Preseason | Miami FC | 1–3 | Colorado Rapids | Davenport, Florida |
| 12:30 PM EST | Mines 8' | Report | Cabral 20'; Rubio 78'; Markanich 81' | Stadium: ChampionsGate Sports Complex |
Note: Start time and location disseminated from social media posts

| February 19 Preseason | Miami FC | 0–1 | Palm Beach Atlantic Sailfish | University Park, Florida |
| 11:00 AM EST | | | Goal | Stadium: FIU Intramural Field |
Note: Confirmed by club at later date

| February 19 Preseason | Miami FC | 4–0 | Naples United FC | University Park, Florida |
| 1:00 PM EST | Murphy; Stanley; Rivas | Report; Bonus | | Stadium: FIU Intramural Field |
Note: Start time, location, and final score disseminated from social media posts

| February 25 Preseason | Miami FC | 1–0 | Florida Atlantic Owls | University Park, Florida |
| 1:00 PM EST | Trialist | Report | | Stadium: FIU Intramural Field |
Note: Details confirmed by club at later date, location disseminated from social media posts

| February 25 Preseason | Inter Miami II | 2–2 | Miami FC | Fort Lauderdale, Florida |
| 1:00 PM EST | Goal | Report | Mines; Rivas | Stadium: DRV PNK Stadium |
Note: Details confirmed by club at later date, location disseminated from social media posts

| March 4 Preseason | Miami FC | 2–0 | FIU Panthers | Miami, Florida |
| 1:00 PM EST | Murphy; Salazar | Report | | Stadium: Riccardo Silva Stadium |
Note: Details confirmed by club at later date, location disseminated from social media posts

== Competitive ==
=== USL Championship ===
==== Standings — Eastern Conference ====
| Pos | Team | Pld | W | L | T | GF | GA | GD | Pts | Qualification |
|---|---|---|---|---|---|---|---|---|---|---|
| 1 | Pittsburgh Riverhounds SC (S) | 34 | 19 | 5 | 10 | 50 | 29 | +21 | 67 | Playoffs |
| 2 | Tampa Bay Rowdies | 34 | 19 | 9 | 6 | 60 | 39 | +21 | 63 | Playoffs |
| 3 | Charleston Battery | 34 | 17 | 9 | 8 | 47 | 43 | +4 | 59 | Playoffs |
| 4 | Memphis 901 FC | 34 | 14 | 10 | 10 | 59 | 53 | +6 | 52 | Playoffs |
| 5 | Louisville City FC | 34 | 14 | 12 | 8 | 41 | 44 | −3 | 50 | Playoffs |
| 6 | Indy Eleven | 34 | 13 | 11 | 10 | 46 | 38 | +8 | 49 | Playoffs |
| 7 | Birmingham Legion FC | 34 | 14 | 16 | 4 | 44 | 53 | −9 | 46 | Playoffs |
| 8 | Detroit City FC | 34 | 11 | 15 | 8 | 30 | 39 | −9 | 41 | Playoffs |
| 9 | Miami FC | 34 | 11 | 15 | 8 | 43 | 44 | −1 | 41 | |
| 10 | FC Tulsa | 34 | 10 | 15 | 9 | 43 | 55 | −12 | 39 | |
| 11 | Loudoun United FC | 34 | 7 | 23 | 4 | 36 | 61 | −25 | 25 | |
| 12 | Hartford Athletic | 34 | 4 | 24 | 6 | 40 | 79 | −39 | 18 | |

Source: USL Championship Standings
(S) Players' Shield winner

==== Results summary ====
| Overall | | | | | | | | Home | | | | | | Away | | | | | |
| Pld | W | D | L | GF | GA | GD | Pts | W | D | L | GF | GA | GD | W | D | L | GF | GA | GD |
|---|---|---|---|---|---|---|---|---|---|---|---|---|---|---|---|---|---|---|---|
| 34 | 11 | 8 | 15 | 43 | 44 | −1 | 41 | 6 | 5 | 6 | 26 | 20 | +6 | 5 | 3 | 9 | 17 | 24 | −7 |

Last updated: complete.
Source: Match reports

==== Match results ====
| March 11 1 | Miami FC | 1–1 | FC Tulsa | Miami, Florida |
| 5:00 PM EST | Valot (yellow card) 20', (goal) 26'; Chapman-Page (yellow card) 22'; Segbers (yellow card) 80' | Report | Bird (yellow card) 13'; Yosef 28'; Corrales (yellow card) 45'; Fernandez (yellow card) 69' | Stadium: Riccardo Silva Stadium; Attendance: 2,092; Referee: John Griggs |

| March 18 2 | Miami FC | 0–1 | New Mexico United | Miami, Florida |
| 7:00 PM EDT | Akinyode (yellow card) 19' | Report | Swartz (yellow card) 14'; Nava (yellow card) 15'; Bruce (yellow card) 80'; Portillo 85' (pen.) | Stadium: Riccardo Silva Stadium; Attendance: 1,445; Referee: Thomas Snyder |

| March 24 3 | Pittsburgh Riverhounds SC | 1–1 | Miami FC | Pittsburgh, Pennsylvania |
| 7:00 PM EDT | Kizza (yellow card) 11'; Ordoñez (yellow card) 27'; Fahling 85' | Report | Murphy 23'; Ofeimu (yellow card) 84'; Chapman-Page (yellow card) 89' | Stadium: Highmark Stadium; Attendance: 2,879; Referee: Gerald Flores |

| April 1 4 | Miami FC | 1–1 | Memphis 901 FC | Miami, Florida |
| 7:00 PM EDT | Sorto (yellow card) 7'; Craig 13', (yellow card) 40'; Telfer (yellow card) 57'; Zendejas (yellow card) 74'; Akinyode (yellow card) 90+3' | Report | Goodrum (yellow card) 39'; Valot 80' (o.g.) | Stadium: Riccardo Silva Stadium; Attendance: 1,175; Referee: Elvis Osmanovic |

| April 8 5 | Tampa Bay Rowdies | 2–0 | Miami FC | St. Petersburg, Florida |
| 7:30 PM EDT | Schröter 23', (yellow card) 60'; Jennings 55', (yellow card) 76'; Ekra (yellow card) 78'; Williams (yellow card) 90+5' | Report | Hernández (yellow card) 32'; Chapman-Page (yellow card) 52'; Segbers (yellow card) 81'; Pulis (yellow card) 89' | Stadium: Al Lang Stadium; Attendance: 6,852; Referee: Matthew Corrigan |

| April 15 6 | Miami FC | 0–0 | Detroit City FC | Miami, Florida |
| 7:00 PM EDT | Salazar (yellow card) 53' | Report | Rodriguez (yellow card) 22'; Diop (yellow card) 32' | Stadium: Riccardo Silva Stadium; Attendance: 1,559; Referee: Melvin Rivas |

| April 23 7 | Miami FC | 4–1 | Las Vegas Lights FC | Miami, Florida |
| 4:00 PM EDT | Sorto 6', (yellow card) 43'; Craig 9'; Dowouna (yellow card) 34'; Repetto 40' (pen.); Rivas 49'; Segbers (yellow card) 61'; Zendejas (yellow card) 83' | Report | Ledesma (yellow card) 39'; Jiménez (yellow card) 43'; Stauffer 73' | Stadium: Riccardo Silva Stadium; Attendance: 1,713; Referee: Olvin Oliva |

| April 29 8 | Oakland Roots SC | 0–0 | Miami FC | Oakland, California |
| 7:00 PM PDT | Hackshaw (yellow card) 17'; Donasiyano (yellow card) 74' | Report | Telfer (yellow card) 89' | Stadium: Laney College Football Stadium; Attendance: 4,540; Referee: Ricardo Fierro |

| May 3 9 | Miami FC | 3–1 | Birmingham Legion FC | Miami, Florida |
| 7:00 PM EDT | Sorto 2', (yellow card) 56'; Crognale 16' (o.g.); Repetto (yellow card) 49'; Dowouna 71' | Report | Corcoran (yellow card) 34'; Martínez 36'; Asiedu (yellow card) 81'; Alves (yellow card) 90+4' | Stadium: Riccardo Silva Stadium; Attendance: 1,070; Referee: Sergii Demianchuk |

| May 13 10 | Louisville City FC | 3–1 | Miami FC | Louisville, Kentucky |
| 7:00 PM EDT | Mares 7', (yellow card) 33'; Cruz (yellow card) 24'; Jimenez (yellow card) 31'; Ownby 62'; Totsch 70' (pen.) | Report | Murphy 11' (pen.); Chapman-Page (yellow card) 43'; Akinyode (yellow card) 77' | Stadium: Lynn Family Stadium; Attendance: 11,279; Referee: Elijio Arreguin |

| May 20 11 | Miami FC | 2–3 | San Diego Loyal SC | Miami, Florida |
| 7:00 PM EDT | Craig (yellow card) 10'; Stoneman 16' (o.g.); Salazar (yellow card) 20'; Murphy (yellow card) 45', (goal) 61'; Segbers (yellow card) 90+2' | Report | Conway 40'; Guido (yellow card) 54'; Corona (yellow card) 61'; Craig 81' (o.g.); Collier 85' | Stadium: Riccardo Silva Stadium; Attendance: 1,538; Referee: Melvin Rivas |

| May 27 12 | Miami FC | 0–0 | Orange County SC | Miami, Florida |
| 7:00 PM EDT | Chapman-Page (yellow card) 16'; Craig (yellow card) 20'; Murphy (yellow card) 45+4'; Akinyode (yellow card) 60'; Cabral (yellow card) 90+4' | Report | Pedersen (yellow card) 44'; Iloski (yellow card) 45+4' | Stadium: Riccardo Silva Stadium; Attendance: 1,374; Referee: Nabil Bensalah |

| June 3 13 | Memphis 901 FC | 5–1 | Miami FC | Memphis, Tennessee |
| 7:30 PM CDT | Kelly 1'; Molloy 22' (pen.); Lapa 34' (pen.); Buckmaster (yellow card) 39'; Pickering (yellow card) 48', (goal) 76'; Peters (yellow card) 65' (yellow-red card) 79'; O'Connor-Ward 89' | Report | Akinyode (yellow card) 5' (yellow-red card) 49', (goal) 41'; Chapman-Page (yellow card) 20'; Pulis (yellow card) 23' | Stadium: AutoZone Park; Referee: Katja Koroleva |

| June 10 14 | Rio Grande Valley FC Toros | 3–3 | Miami FC | Edinburg, Texas |
| 7:00 PM CDT | Pimentel (yellow card) 3'; Ruiz (yellow card) 19'; Davila (yellow card) 23'; Cabrera Jr. 38'; López 41'; Ackwei 90+7' | Report | Murphy 4' (pen.); Hernández (yellow card) 24'; Repetto 62'; Chapman-Page (yellow card) 68'; Telfer 78' | Stadium: H-E-B Park; Attendance: 5,560; Referee: Elton García |

| June 17 15 | Miami FC | 1–2 | Loudoun United FC | Miami, Florida |
| 7:00 PM EDT | Sorto (yellow card) 24', (goal) 58'; Hernández (yellow card) 35' | Report | Ryan 36' (pen.); Hopkins 45'; Houssou (yellow card) 54'; Akinmboni (yellow card) 78'; Zanne (yellow card) 90+4' | Stadium: Riccardo Silva Stadium; Attendance: 1,357; Referee: Elvis Osmanovic |

| June 24 16 | Monterey Bay FC | 1–0 | Miami FC | Seaside, California |
| 7:00 PM PDT | Greene (yellow card) 27'; Volesky 67', (yellow card) 90+2' | Report | Murphy (penalty missed) 65' | Stadium: Cardinale Stadium; Attendance: 3,910; Referee: Corbyn May |

| July 1 17 | Colorado Springs Switchbacks FC | 2–0 | Miami FC | Colorado Springs, Colorado |
| 7:00 PM MDT | Beckford 59'; Tejada (yellow card) 61'; Williams 75' | Report | Cabral (yellow card) 83' | Stadium: Weidner Field; Attendance: 7,926; Referee: Nabil Bensalah |

| July 8 18 | Miami FC | 2–1 | Phoenix Rising FC | Miami, Florida |
| 7:00 PM EDT | Murphy 15'; Stanley (yellow card) 45+2'; Sorto (yellow card) 45+2', (goal) 55'; Segbers (yellow card) 84' | Report | Harvey (yellow card) 28'; King (yellow card) 41'; Trejo 44'; Arteaga (yellow card) 45+2'; Zambrano (yellow card) 79' | Stadium: Riccardo Silva Stadium; Attendance: 1,248; Referee: Austin Saini |

| July 12 19 | FC Tulsa | 1–0 | Miami FC | Tulsa, Oklahoma |
| 8:00 PM CDT | Malou (yellow card) 22'; Bird (yellow card) 30'; Epps (yellow card) 63', (goal) 61'; Goodrum (yellow card) 62'; Armour (yellow card) 76'; Ferri (yellow card) 90+4'; Nelson (yellow card) 90+8' | Report | Segbers (yellow card) 34'; Craig (yellow card) 90+3' | Stadium: ONEOK Field; Attendance: 4,583; Referee: Izlen Peksenar |

| July 15 20 | Miami FC | 1–1 | Charleston Battery | Miami, Florida |
| 7:00 PM EDT | Murphy (penalty missed) 5'; Mines 83' | Report | Dodson (yellow card) 30'; Pirmann (yellow card) 30'; Ycaza (yellow card) 69'; Crawford (yellow card) 80'; Rodríguez (yellow card) 84'; Booth 90+7' | Stadium: Riccardo Silva Stadium; Attendance: 1,308; Referee: Gabriele Giusti |

| July 22 21 | San Antonio FC | 0–1 | Miami FC | San Antonio, Texas |
| 8:00 PM CDT | Garcia (yellow card) 34'; Hernández (yellow card) 67' | Report | Craig (yellow card) 5' (yellow-red card) 10'; Telfer 7'; Rivas (yellow card) 90+4' | Stadium: Toyota Field; Attendance: 7,098; Referee: Adam Kilpatrick |

| July 29 22 | Loudoun United FC | 1–2 | Miami FC | Leesburg, Virginia |
| 7:30 PM EDT | Hernández 20' (o.g.); Garay (yellow card) 24'; Houssou (yellow card) 45+3'; Santos (yellow card) 52'; Turner (yellow card) 90+1'; Leggett (yellow card) 90+7'; Koanda (yellow card) 90+8' | Report | Salazar 11'; Telfer 39' | Stadium: Segra Field; Attendance: 1,992; Referee: Luis Arroyo |

| August 5 23 | Miami FC | 4–0 | El Paso Locomotive FC | Miami, Florida |
| 7:00 PM EDT | Rivas 13', 45+4' (pen.); Ofeimu (yellow card) 62'; Hinds 90+1' (o.g.); Cabral 90+4' | Report | Gómez (yellow card) 45+1'; Clarhaut (yellow card) 45+3' (yellow-red card) 45+3'; Navarro (yellow card) 48' | Stadium: Riccardo Silva Stadium; Attendance: 1,133; Referee: Calin Radosav |

| August 12 24 | Miami FC | 0–1 | Indy Eleven | Miami, Florida |
| 7:00 PM EDT | Akinyode (yellow card) 12'; Rivas (yellow card) 62' | Report | Boudadi (yellow card) 47'; Diz Pe 51'; Lindley (yellow card) 66' | Stadium: Riccardo Silva Stadium; Attendance: 1,509; Referee: Rubiel Vazquez |

| August 19 25 | Hartford Athletic | 0–3 | Miami FC | Hartford, Connecticut |
| 7:00 PM EDT | Hoppenot (yellow card) 44'; Merrill (yellow card) 45+2'; Méndez (yellow card) 51'; Makangila (yellow card) 83' | Report | Rivas 33', 59' (pen.), 84'; Salazar (yellow card) 65'; Stanley (yellow card) 68' | Stadium: Trinity Health Stadium; Attendance: 5,500; Referee: Austin Saini |

| August 26 26 | Miami FC | 0–2 | Tampa Bay Rowdies | Miami, Florida |
| 7:00 PM EDT | Ofeimu (yellow card) 90+7' | Report | Jennings 36'; Kleemann (yellow card) 67'; Dennis 87' (pen.) | Stadium: Riccardo Silva Stadium; Attendance: 1,543; Referee: Sergii Demianchuk |

| September 2 27 | Indy Eleven | 1–0 | Miami FC | Indianapolis, Indiana |
| 7:00 PM EDT | Boudadi (yellow card) 27'; Guenzatti 72'; Robledo (yellow card) 90+2'; Quinn (yellow card) 90+9' | Report | Segbers (yellow card) 20'; Salazar (yellow card) 34'; Akinyode (yellow card) 36'; Stanley (yellow card) 88'; Lewis Neal (yellow card) 89'; Craig (red card) 90+3' | Stadium: Carroll Stadium; Attendance: 10,175; Referee: Elijio Arreguin |

| September 9 28 | Detroit City FC | 2–1 | Miami FC | Hamtramck, Michigan |
| 7:30 PM EDT | Bryant 2'; Rodriguez (yellow card) 24'; Amoo-Mensah 55' | Report | Zendejas (yellow card) 45+3'; Valot (yellow card) 61'; Repetto 75' (pen.); Segbers (yellow card) 86'; Ofeimu (yellow card) 90+2' | Stadium: Keyworth Stadium; Attendance: 6,528; Referee: Ricardo Fierro |

| September 16 29 | Miami FC | 1–2 | Pittsburgh Riverhounds SC | Miami, Florida |
| 7:00 PM EDT | Rivas (yellow card) 9'; Akinyode (yellow card) 17' (yellow-red card) 76'; Craig (yellow card) 62'; Segbers (yellow card) 68'; Telfer 88' | Report | Etou (yellow card) 28'; Dikwa 63' (pen.); Rovira (yellow card) 74'; Griffin (yellow card) 84'; Mertz 90' | Stadium: Riccardo Silva Stadium; Attendance: 1,034; Referee: Benjamin Meyer |

| September 20 30 | Miami FC | 4–3 | Louisville City FC | Miami, Florida |
| 7:00 PM EDT | Sorto 32'; Segbers (yellow card) 35'; Rivas 62', 86' (pen.); Cabral 78'; Repetto (yellow card) 90+3' | Report | Totsch 15', 74' (pen.); Wynder (yellow card) 30'; Harris 48'; Charpie (yellow card) 79' | Stadium: Riccardo Silva Stadium; Attendance: 1,007; Referee: Elvis Osmanovic |

| September 24 31 | Birmingham Legion FC | 0–2 | Miami FC | Birmingham, Alabama |
| 7:30 PM CDT | Lopez (yellow card) 19'; Martínez (penalty missed) 50' | Report | Valot (yellow card) 22'; Ofeimu 35', (yellow card) 41'; Telfer (yellow card) 77'; Murphy 84' | Stadium: Protective Stadium; Referee: Abdou Ndiaye |

| September 30 32 | Miami FC | 2–0 | Hartford Athletic | Miami, Florida |
| 7:00 PM EDT | Akinyode (yellow card) 28'; Valot 65'; Rivas 78' | Report | Edwards (yellow card) 26'; Barrera (yellow card) 69'; McGlynn (yellow card) 71' | Stadium: Riccardo Silva Stadium; Attendance: 2,235; Referee: Joe Surgan |

| October 7 33 | Charleston Battery | 1–2 | Miami FC | Mount Pleasant, South Carolina |
| 6:00 PM EDT | Williams 7'; Barajas (yellow card) 38'; Allan (yellow card) 53'; Trager (yellow card) 86' | Report | Rivas 56' (pen.); Cabral (yellow card) 65'; Salazar 80', (yellow card) 85' | Stadium: Patriots Point Soccer Complex; Attendance: 4,463; Referee: DeShun Beard |

| October 14 34 | Sacramento Republic FC | 1–0 | Miami FC | Sacramento, California |
| 7:00 PM PDT | Archimède (yellow card) 64'; Cicerone 69' | Report | Craig (yellow card) 23'; Sorto (yellow card) 67'; Ofeimu (yellow card) 74' | Stadium: Heart Health Park; Attendance: 11,569; Referee: Thomas Snyder |

=== U.S. Open Cup ===
As a USL Championship club, Miami FC entered the competition in the Second Round, played between April 4–6.

| April 4 | Miami FC (USLC) (Florida) | 3–1 | (Florida) Jacksonville Armada U-23 (NPSL) | Miami, Florida |
| 7:00 PM EDT | Thorn (yellow card) 30' (yellow-red card) 50'; Telfer 34'; Akinyode (yellow card) 45+2'; Repetto 82', 85' (pen.) | MLS Report; Soccerway Report | Kobiljar (yellow card) 28'; Eloundou 33', (yellow card) 37'; Tom (yellow card) 40' (yellow-red card) 43'; Redmore (yellow card) 57' (yellow-red card) 84'; Jean (yellow card) 78'; Rulle (yellow card) 82' | Stadium: FIU Soccer Stadium; Attendance: 654; Referee: Jonathan Bilinski |

| April 26 | Miami FC (USLC) (Florida) | 2–2 (a.e.t.) (3–5 p) | (Florida) Inter Miami CF (MLS) | Miami, Florida |
| 7:30 PM EDT | Sorto 3'; Craig (yellow card) 14'; Akinyode (yellow card) 51'; Dowouna (yellow card) 61'; Zendejas (yellow card) 68'; Yedlin 116' (o.g.); Lawrence (yellow card) 119' | MLS Report; Soccerway Report | Borgelin (yellow card) 71', (goal) 89'; Negri (yellow card) 90+6'; Sailor 118' | Stadium: Riccardo Silva Stadium; Attendance: 12,099; Referee: Elton García |
| | Penalties |
| | Hernández (penalty scored); Craig (penalty scored); Salazar (penalty scored); Telfer (penalty missed) | | (penalty scored) Martínez; (penalty scored) Ulloa; (penalty scored) Negri; (penalty scored) Mota; (penalty scored) Miller |

== Squad statistics ==
As of Match played October 14, 2023

=== Appearances and goals ===
| No. | Pos | Nat | Player | Total | | Regular Season | | Open Cup | |
| No. | Pos | Nat | Player | Apps | Goals | Apps | Goals | Apps | Goals |
Goalkeepers
| 1 | GK | (United States) USA | Jake McGuire | 13 | 0 | 12+0 | 0 | 1+0 | 0 |
| 13 | GK | (United States) USA | Adrian Zendejas | 23 | 0 | 22+0 | 0 | 1+0 | 0 |
Defenders
| 3 | DF | (United States) USA | Aedan Stanley | 36 | 0 | 34+0 | 0 | 2+0 | 0 |
| 4 | DF | (England) ENG | Paco Craig | 35 | 2 | 33+0 | 2 | 2+0 | 0 |
| 6 | DF | (Guatemala) GUA | Moisés Hernández | 21 | 0 | 13+6 | 0 | 2+0 | 0 |
| 22 | DF | (United States) USA | Ben Ofeimu | 21 | 1 | 13+7 | 1 | 0+1 | 0 |
| 23 | DF | (England) ENG | Curtis Thorn | 18 | 0 | 13+4 | 0 | 1+0 | 0 |
| 77 | DF | (Brazil) BRA | Gustavo Rissi | 1 | 0 | 1+0 | 0 | 0+0 | 0 |
Midfielders
| 8 | MF | (Brazil) BRA | Gabriel Cabral | 22 | 2 | 18+4 | 2 | 0+0 | 0 |
| 10 | MF | (France) FRA | Florian Valot | 27 | 2 | 22+3 | 2 | 2+0 | 0 |
| 14 | MF | (Trinidad and Tobago) TTO | Ryan Telfer | 30 | 5 | 22+6 | 4 | 2+0 | 1 |
| 15 | MF | (United States) USA | Lorenzo Di Mercurio | 2 | 0 | 0+2 | 0 | 0+0 | 0 |
| 18 | MF | (Ghana) GHA | Dennis Dowouna | 19 | 1 | 9+8 | 1 | 1+1 | 0 |
| 20 | MF | (United States) USA | Ben Mines | 23 | 1 | 6+16 | 1 | 0+1 | 0 |
| 21 | MF | (Nigeria) NGR | Bolu Akinyode | 30 | 1 | 28+0 | 1 | 2+0 | 0 |
| 30 | MF | (United States) USA | Christopher Jean-Francois | 0 | 0 | 0+0 | 0 | 0+0 | 0 |
Forwards
| 7 | FW | (Italy) ITA | Claudio Repetto | 29 | 5 | 10+17 | 3 | 1+1 | 2 |
| 9 | FW | (United States) USA | Kyle Murphy | 30 | 6 | 20+9 | 6 | 1+0 | 0 |
| 11 | FW | (El Salvador) ESA | Joaquín Rivas | 26 | 10 | 19+6 | 10 | 0+1 | 0 |
| 17 | FW | (Belize) BLZ | Michael Salazar | 34 | 2 | 19+13 | 2 | 1+1 | 0 |
| 19 | FW | (United States) USA | Michael Lawrence | 4 | 0 | 0+3 | 0 | 0+1 | 0 |
| 99 | FW | (El Salvador) ESA | Christian Sorto | 35 | 6 | 24+9 | 5 | 2+0 | 1 |
Left during season
| 2 | DF | (United States) USA | Mark Segbers | 32 | 0 | 25+5 | 0 | 1+1 | 0 |
| 5 | DF | (England) ENG | Callum Chapman-Page | 11 | 0 | 11+0 | 0 | 0+0 | 0 |
| 31 | GK | (England) ENG | Noah Abrams | 0 | 0 | 0+0 | 0 | 0+0 | 0 |

=== Goal scorers ===
| Place | Position | Nation | Number | Name | Regular Season | Open Cup | Total |
|---|---|---|---|---|---|---|---|
| 1 | FW | (El Salvador) | 11 | Joaquín Rivas | 10 | 0 | 10 |
| 2 | FW | (United States) | 9 | Kyle Murphy | 6 | 0 | 6 |
| 2 | FW | (El Salvador) | 99 | Christian Sorto | 5 | 1 | 6 |
| 3 | FW | (Italy) | 7 | Claudio Repetto | 3 | 2 | 5 |
| 3 | MF | (Trinidad and Tobago) | 14 | Ryan Telfer | 4 | 1 | 5 |
| 4 | | | | Own goal | 3 | 1 | 4 |
| 5 | DF | (England) | 4 | Paco Craig | 2 | 0 | 2 |
| 5 | MF | (Brazil) | 8 | Gabriel Cabral | 2 | 0 | 2 |
| 5 | MF | (France) | 10 | Florian Valot | 2 | 0 | 2 |
| 5 | FW | (Belize) | 17 | Michael Salazar | 2 | 0 | 2 |
| 6 | MF | (Ghana) | 18 | Dennis Dowouna | 1 | 0 | 1 |
| 6 | MF | (United States) | 20 | Ben Mines | 1 | 0 | 1 |
| 6 | MF | (Nigeria) | 21 | Bolu Akinyode | 1 | 0 | 1 |
| 6 | DF | (United States) | 22 | Ben Ofeimu | 1 | 0 | 1 |

=== Disciplinary record ===
| Number | Nation | Position | Name | Regular Season | | Open Cup | | Total | |
| Number | Nation | Position | Name | Yellow card | Red card | Yellow card | Red card | Yellow card | Red card |
| 2 | (United States) | DF | Mark Segbers | 10 | 0 | 0 | 0 | 10 | 0 |
| 3 | (United States) | DF | Aedan Stanley | 3 | 0 | 0 | 0 | 3 | 0 |
| 4 | (England) | DF | Paco Craig | 8 | 2 | 1 | 0 | 9 | 2 |
| 5 | (England) | DF | Callum Chapman-Page | 7 | 0 | 0 | 0 | 7 | 0 |
| 6 | (Guatemala) | DF | Moisés Hernández | 3 | 0 | 0 | 0 | 3 | 0 |
| 7 | (Italy) | FW | Claudio Repetto | 2 | 0 | 0 | 0 | 2 | 0 |
| 8 | (Brazil) | MF | Gabriel Cabral | 3 | 0 | 0 | 0 | 3 | 0 |
| 9 | (United States) | FW | Kyle Murphy | 2 | 0 | 0 | 0 | 2 | 0 |
| 10 | (France) | MF | Florian Valot | 3 | 0 | 0 | 0 | 3 | 0 |
| 11 | (El Salvador) | FW | Joaquín Rivas | 3 | 0 | 0 | 0 | 3 | 0 |
| 13 | (United States) | GK | Adrian Zendejas | 3 | 0 | 1 | 0 | 4 | 0 |
| 14 | (Trinidad and Tobago) | MF | Ryan Telfer | 3 | 0 | 0 | 0 | 3 | 0 |
| 17 | (Belize) | FW | Michael Salazar | 5 | 0 | 0 | 0 | 5 | 0 |
| 18 | (Ghana) | MF | Dennis Dowouna | 1 | 0 | 1 | 0 | 2 | 0 |
| 19 | (United States) | FW | Michael Lawrence | 0 | 0 | 1 | 0 | 1 | 0 |
| 21 | (Nigeria) | MF | Bolu Akinyode | 11 | 2 | 2 | 0 | 13 | 2 |
| 22 | (United States) | DF | Ben Ofeimu | 6 | 0 | 0 | 0 | 6 | 0 |
| 23 | (England) | DF | Curtis Thorn | 0 | 0 | 2 | 1 | 2 | 1 |
| 99 | (El Salvador) | FW | Christian Sorto | 6 | 0 | 0 | 0 | 6 | 0 |

== Notes ==
1. ^{A} Recalled by Miami for May 27 away match versus Orange County SC. Appeared in 18-man roster and finished the match as an un-used substitute. Abrams returned to Charlotte after this game.
