= 2020 Coastal Carolina Chanticleers men's soccer team =

University sport team

2020 Coastal Carolina Chanticleers men's soccer

Sun Belt Regular Season and Tournament Champions

NCAA Tournament
- Conference: Sun Belt Conference
- Record: 6–1–1 (5–1–0 Sun Belt)
- Head coach: Shaun Docking (23rd season)
- Assistant coaches: Oliver Slawson (1st season); Chris Fidler (1st season)
- Home stadium: Coastal Carolina University Soccer Field

2020 Sun Belt Conference men's soccer standings
| | Conf. | | | | | Overall |
| Team | W | | L | | T | W | | L | | T |
|---|---|---|---|---|---|---|---|---|---|---|
| No. 23 Coastal Carolina ‡ | 5 | – | 1 | – | 0 | 6 | – | 2 | – | 1 |
| Georgia State | 4 | – | 2 | – | 0 | 9 | – | 2 | – | 2 |
| Central Arkansas | 3 | – | 3 | – | 0 | 4 | – | 6 | – | 2 |
| Georgia Southern | 0 | – | 6 | – | 0 | 1 | – | 9 | – | 0 |
‡ – 2020 Sun Belt Tournament Champion + – Also invited to the 2020 NCAA tournament Note: † Due to COVID-19, Howard has suspended the 2020 men's soccer season.; As of March 2, 2021; Rankings from United Soccer Coaches

The 2020 Coastal Carolina Chanticleers men's soccer team represented Coastal Carolina University during the 2020 NCAA Division I men's soccer season and the 2020 Sun Belt Conference men's soccer season. The regular season was initially scheduled to begin on August 28 and concluded on November 6. Due to the COVID-19 pandemic, the regular season start was delayed to September 18, with Coastal Carolina playing their first game on October 10. It was the program's 43rd season fielding a men's varsity soccer team, and their 5th season in the Sun Belt. The 200 2season was Shaun Docking's 23rd year as head coach for the program. Assistant coaches Oliver Slawson and Chris Fidler were in their first year as assistant coaches.

Coastal Carolina had one of their more successful conference seasons, winning their third Sun Belt regular season championship and fourth Sun Belt Tournament championship. It was the Chanticleer's 14th overall conference regular season championship, and 16th overall tournament championship, including their history in the Sun Belt and Big South Conference.

== Team management ==
| Position | Staff |
Front office
| Athletic Director | (United States) Matt Hogue |
| Deputy Athletic Director | (United States) Dwayne Beam |
| Director of Athletic Training | (United States) Barry Lippman |
Coaching staff
| Head coach | (United States) Shaun Docking |
| Assistant coach | (United States) Oliver Slawson |
| Assistant coach | (United States) Chris Fidler |

Last updated: November 22, 2020
Source: Coastal Carolina Staff Directory

== Roster ==
Updated November 16, 2020

Note: Flags indicate national team as defined under FIFA eligibility rules; some limited exceptions apply. Players may hold more than one non-FIFA nationality.

| No. | Pos. | Nation | Player |
|---|---|---|---|
| 1 | GK | USA | Tor Saunders |
| 2 | DF | USA | Lucian Lang |
| 3 | MF | USA | Matt McLaws |
| 4 | DF | RSA | Nicholas Itopoulos |
| 5 | DF | USA | Marcelo Lage |
| 6 | DF | DEN | Kasper Skraep |
| 7 | FW | ITA | Claudio Repetto |
| 8 | MF | USA | Michael Boakye |
| 8 | MF | ENG | Marcello Jones |
| 9 | FW | CRC | Esteban Leiva |
| 10 | FW | DEN | Gabriel Christensen |
| 11 | MF | JPN | Kazuki Kimura |
| 12 | FW | ISR | Yochai Kariv |
| 13 | FW | USA | Ben Kaindu |
| 14 | MF | USA | Jason Kemble |
| 15 | FW | USA | Noah Glorioso |
| 16 | MF | IRL | Conor Pugh |

| No. | Pos. | Nation | Player |
|---|---|---|---|
| 17 | MF | FRA | Emile Rzepecki |
| 18 | MF | ENG | Thomas Fielding |
| 19 | FW | USA | Ethan Hackenberg |
| 20 | MF | USA | DZ Harmon |
| 21 | MF | USA | Lucas Hales |
| 22 | FW | USA | Adriel Sanchez |
| 23 | MF | MEX | Andres Rivera |
| 24 | MF | USA | Taylor Cabaniss |
| 25 | MF | USA | Luis Romero |
| 26 | DF | FRA | Maël Couteau |
| 27 | MF | USA | Ben Brucken |
| 28 | FW | USA | Christian Silvano |
| 29 | GK | ENG | Pete Arnold |
| 30 | GK | USA | Ben Lado |
| 31 | GK | USA | Jacob Segoria |
| 32 | GK | USA | Henry Butterworth |

== Player movement ==
=== Departures ===
| Name | Number | Pos. | Height | Weight | Year | Hometown | Reason for departure |

=== Arrivals ===
==== Recruits ====
| Name | Nat. | Hometown | Club | High School | TDS Rating |
|---|---|---|---|---|---|
| Esteban Leiva; MF | CRC | San Jose, CRC | —N/a | Mount View (WV) | —N/a |
| Gabriel Christensen; FW | DEN | Aalborg, DEN | AaB | Aalborghus | —N/a |
| Yochai Kariv; FW | ISR | Kochav Yair, ISR | Hapoel Kfar Saba | Galili | —N/a |
| Ben Kaindu; FW | USA | Lexington, KY | Lexington FC | Tates Creek | 2/5 stars |
| Noah Glorioso; FW | USA | Naperville, IL | Galaxy SC | Waubonsie Valley | 2/5 stars |
| Thomas Fielding; MF | ENG | Leicester, ENG | Mansfield Town | Uppingham (UK) | |
| Ethan Hackenberg; FW | USA | Pittsburgh, PA | Cleveland Internationals | Seneca Valley | |
| Lucas Hales; MF | USA | Winston-Salem, NC | North Carolina Fusion | Reagan (NC) | |
| Adriel Sanchez; FW | USA | Coachella Valley, CA | Desert United | La Quinta | |
| Andres River; MF | MEX | Puebla, MEX | Pubela | Instituto Oriente De Puebla | |
| Taylor Cabaniss; MF | USA | Charlotte, NC | Mid-City Lions | Olympic (NC) | |
| Luis Romero; MF | USA | Charlotte, NC | Charlotte FC | Providence (NC) | |
| Mael Couteau; DF | FRA | Guyancourt, FRA | Stade Reims | CENS Nantes, Saint-Michel | |
| Ben Brucken; MF | USA | Copley, OH | Cleveland Internationals | Copley | |
| Christian Silvano; FW | USA | Kennesaw, GA | Mid-City Lions | Kennesaw Mountain | |
| Ben Lado; GK | USA | Baldwinsville, NY | Empire United | Charles W. Baker | |
| Jacob Segoria; GK | USA | The Woodlands, TX | Houston Dynamo | The Woodlands | |
| Henry Butterworth; GK | USA | Summerville, SC | Charleston Battery | Summerville | |

==== Transfers ====
| Name | Nat. | No. | Pos. | Height | Year | Hometown | Notes |
|---|---|---|---|---|---|---|---|
| Tor Saunders | USA | 1 | GK | 6 ft 5 in (1.96 m) | Sr. | Bothell, WA | Transferred from Akron |
| Lucian Lang | USA | 2 | DF | 6 ft 0 in (1.83 m) | So. | Wheaton, IL | Transferred from Green Bay |
| Matt McLaws | USA | 3 | MF | 5 ft 11 in (1.80 m) | Fr. Redshirt | Edmond, OK | Transferred from SMU |
| Kazuki Kimura | JPN | 11 | MF | 5 ft 7 in (1.70 m) | Jr. | Hyōgo, JPN | Transferred from Marshalltown |
| Connor Pugh | IRL | 16 | MF | 6 ft 0 in (1.83 m) | So. | Dublin, IRL | Transferred from Onondaga |
| Pete Arnold | ENG | 29 | GK | 6 ft 0 in (1.83 m) | So. | Woking, ENG | Transferred from Indianapolis |

== Competitions ==
=== Sun Belt regular season ===
| October 10, 2020 1 | Coastal Carolina | 1–0 | Georgia State | Conway, South Carolina |
| 13:00 EDT | Mael Couteau 81' | Report | George Proctor (yellow card) 80' | Stadium: CCU Soccer Field; Attendance: 150; Referee: Brandon Marion |

| October 16, 2020 2 | Coastal Carolina | 3–2 | Central Arkansas | Atlanta, Georgia |
| 12:00 EDT | Marcelo Lage 4'; Connor Pugh 14'; Mael Couteau (yellow card) 40'; Nicholas Itopoulos (yellow card) 54'; Ethan Hackenberg 74'; Kasper Skraep (yellow card) 90+1' | Report | Soren Jensen 19' (pen.) (yellow card) 80'; Edoardo Merci (yellow card) 53'; Alberto Suarez 69'; Edoardo Calzola (yellow card) 74' | Stadium: Center Parc Stadium; Attendance: 50 |

| October 18, 2020 3 | Central Arkansas | 0–1 (a.e.t.) | Coastal Carolina | Atlanta, Georgia |
| 13:00 EDT | Alberto Suarez (yellow card) 75' | Report | Marcelo Lage (yellow card) 47' 95'; Noah Glorioso (yellow card) 91' | Stadium: Center Parc Stadium; Attendance: 62 |

| October 25, 2020 4 | Coastal Carolina | 2–1 (a.e.t.) | Georgia Southern | Conway, South Carolina |
| 14:00 EDT | Marcelo Lage 5'; Ethan Hackenberg 100' | Report | Adam Davie 82' | Stadium: CCU Soccer Field |

| November 1, 2020 5 | Georgia State | 2–0 | Coastal Carolina | Decatur, Georgia |
| 13:00 EDT | | | | Stadium: GSU Soccer Field |

| November 6, 2020 6 | Georgia Southern | 0–3 | Coastal Carolina | Statesboro, Georgia |
| 18:00 EST |

=== Sun Belt Tournament ===
| November 13, 2020 Semifinals | Coastal Carolina | 6–0 | Georgia Southern | Atlanta, Georgia |
| 16:00 EST | Marcelo Lage 30', 64' Marcello Jones 63', 67' Esteban Leiva 72', 84' | Report | | Stadium: Center Parc Stadium; Attendance: 233 |

| November 15, 2020 Final | Coastal Carolina | 0–0 (a.e.t.) (4–3 p) | Georgia State | Atlanta, Georgia |
| | DZ Harmon (yellow card) 28'; Ethan Hackenberg (yellow card) 110' | Report | Matthew Fearnley (yellow card) 23'; George Proctor (red card) 52'; Carlos Luna (yellow card) 64' | Stadium: Center Parc Stadium; Attendance: 412 |
| | Penalties |
| | Emile Rzepecki (penalty scored); Claudio Repetto (penalty scored); Esteban Leiva (penalty scored); Connor Pugh (penalty missed); DZ Harmon (penalty scored) | | (penalty scored) Simon Carlson; (penalty scored) Ross Finnie; (penalty missed) Matthew Fearnley; (penalty scored) Gunther Rankenburg; (penalty missed) Carlos Luna |

=== Spring 2021 season ===
| February 20, 2021 7 | Coastal Carolina | P–P | ^{No. 1} Pittsburgh | Conway, South Carolina |
| 16:00 EDT | | | | Stadium: CCU Soccer Field |
Note: Canceled due to COVID-19 protocols

| February 28, 2021 8 | Coastal Carolina | 0–2 | ^{No. 4} Virginia Tech | Conway, South Carolina |
| 13:00 EDT | Tor Saunders (yellow card) 57' | Report | Kyle Stenzel (yellow card) 25'; Jacob Labovitz 26'; Sivert Haugli 57' (pen.); Daniel Starr (yellow card) 61'; Zane Bubb (yellow card) 71' | Stadium: CCU Soccer Field; Attendance: 200; Referee: David Erbacher |

| March 3, 2021 9 | Coastal Carolina | P–P | VCU | Conway, South Carolina |
| 15:00 EDT | | | | Stadium: CCU Soccer Field |
Note: Canceled due to COVID-19 protocols

| March 7, 2021 10 | Coastal Carolina | 2–1 | College of Charleston | Conway, South Carolina |
| 13:00 EDT | Claudio Repetto 9'; Luis Romero 65'; Alex Kinateder (yellow card) 74' | Report | Zinho Ballish (yellow card) 31'; Akshat Singh (yellow card) 64'; Eneko Sancho (yellow card) 71'; Jakob Kristensen 77' | Stadium: CCU Soccer Field; Attendance: 100; Referee: Dustin Thorne |

| March 20, 2021 11 | Coastal Carolina | 1–1 (a.e.t.) | Lipscomb | Conway, South Carolina |
| 13:00 EST | Claudio Repetto 7'; Emile Rzepecki (yellow card) 48'; Andres Rivera (yellow card) 59' | Report | Noah Gulden 13'; Hayes Wood (yellow card) 58'; Louis Robinson (yellow card) 67' | Stadium: CCU Soccer Field; Attendance: 163; Referee: Izlen Peksenar |

| March 27, 2021 12 | Villanova | 0–1 | Coastal Carolina | Richmond, Virginia |
| 15:00 EST | | Report | Connor Pugh 75' | Stadium: City Stadium; Attendance: 25 |
Note: Neutral venue

| March 30, 2021 13 | Coastal Carolina | P–P | Charlotte | Conway, South Carolina |
| 15:00 EST | | | | Stadium: CCU Soccer Field |
Note: Canceled due to COVID-19 protocols

| April 3, 2021 14 | Coastal Carolina | 2–1 | ^{No. 9} UNCW | Conway, South Carolina |
| 18:00 EST | Claudio Repetto 63' (yellow card) 89'; Ethan Hackenberg (yellow card) 70'; Alex Kinateder (yellow card) 71'; Kasper Skraep 77'; Lucas Hales (yellow card) 82' | Report | Jaden Strumeier 86'; Gabe Mercer (yellow card) 86'; Tsubasa Takada (yellow card) 89' | Stadium: CCU Soccer Field; Attendance: 100; Referee: John Motto |

| March 30, 2021 15 | College of Charleston | 1–0 (a.e.t.) | Coastal Carolina | Mount Pleasant, South Carolina |
| 18:00 EST | Chatham Headrick 97' | Report | Alex Kinateder (yellow card) 22'; Emile Rzepecki (yellow card) 83' | Stadium: Ralph Lundy Field; Attendance: 210; Referee: David Erbachner |

| April 17, 2021 16 | Coastal Carolina | 1–2 | Liberty | Conway, South Carolina |
| 19:00 EST | Connor Pugh 60'; Marcelo Lage (yellow card) 90' | Report | Seth Clark 19'; Gabe Findley (yellow card) 26'; Noah Holmes 37' | Stadium: CCU Soccer Field; Attendance: 100; Referee: Marc Lawrence |
Note: Canceled due to COVID-19 protocols

=== NCAA Tournament ===
| May 2, 2021 Second round | ^{(5)} Wake Forest | 3–2 | Coastal Carolina | Winston-Salem, North Carolina |
| 13:00 EST | Omar Hernandez 6', 48'; Coastal Carolina 22' (o.g.); David Wrona (yellow card) 28'; Takuma Suzuki (yellow card) 86' | Report | Kasper Skraep 46'; Claudio Repetto 81'; Connor Pugh (yellow card) 87' | Stadium: Spry Stadium; Attendance: 509; Referee: Mike Stutt |

== Statistics ==
=== Appearances and goals ===
Numbers after plus–sign (+) denote appearances as a substitute.

| No. | Pos | Nat | Player | Total | | Regular season | | SBC Tournament | | NCAA Tournament | |
| No. | Pos | Nat | Player | Apps | Goals | Apps | Goals | Apps | Goals | Apps | Goals |
|---|---|---|---|---|---|---|---|---|---|---|---|
| – | MF | (Paraguay) PAR | Cecilio Domínguez | 0 | 0 | 0+0 | 0 | 0+0 | 0 | 0+0 | 0 |
| – | FW | (Paraguay) PAR | Rodney Redes | 0 | 0 | 0+0 | 0 | 0+0 | 0 | 0+0 | 0 |

- Last updated: November 12, 2020
- Source: TBD

=== Top scorers ===
| Rank | Position | Number | Name | Regular season | SBC Tournament | NCAA Tournament | Total |
|---|---|---|---|---|---|---|---|
| 1 | DF | 5 | (United States) Marcelo Lage | 3 | 2 | 0 | 5 |
| 2 | MF | 8 | (England) Marcello Jones | 0 | 2 | 0 | 2 |
| 2 | FW | 9 | (Costa Rica) Esteban Leiva | 0 | 2 | 0 | 2 |
| 2 | FW | 19 | (United States) Ethan Hackenberg | 2 | 0 | 0 | 2 |
| 5 | | | | 1 | 0 | 0 | 1 |
| 5 | | | | 1 | 0 | 0 | 1 |
| 5 | | | | 1 | 0 | 0 | 1 |
| 5 | | | | 1 | 0 | 0 | 1 |
| 5 | | | | 1 | 0 | 0 | 1 |

=== Top assists ===
| Rank | Position | Number | Name | Regular season | SBC Tournament | NCAA Tournament | Total |

=== Disciplinary record ===
As of November 19, 2020

| No. | Pos. | Player | Regular season | | | SBC Tournament | | | NCAA Tournament | | | Total | | |
| No. | Pos. | Player | Booked | (yellow card) (yellow-red card) | Sent off (straight red) | Booked | (yellow card) (yellow-red card) | Sent off (straight red) | Booked | (yellow card) (yellow-red card) | Sent off (straight red) | Booked | (yellow card) (yellow-red card) | Sent off (straight red) |
| 4 | DF | (South Africa) Nicholas Itopoulos | 2 | 0 | 0 | 0 | 0 | 0 | 0 | 0 | 0 | 2 | 0 | 0 |
| 6 | DF | (Denmark) Kasper Skraep | 2 | 0 | 0 | 0 | 0 | 0 | 0 | 0 | 0 | 2 | 0 | 0 |
| 19 | FW | (United States) Ethan Hackenberg | 0 | 0 | 0 | 2 | 0 | 0 | 0 | 0 | 0 | 2 | 0 | 0 |
| 5 | DF | (United States) Marcelo Lage | 1 | 0 | 0 | 0 | 0 | 0 | 0 | 0 | 0 | 1 | 0 | 0 |
| 15 | MF | (United States) Noah Glorioso | 1 | 0 | 0 | 0 | 0 | 0 | 0 | 0 | 0 | 1 | 0 | 0 |
| 20 | MF | (United States) DZ Harmon | 0 | 0 | 0 | 1 | 0 | 0 | 0 | 0 | 0 | 1 | 0 | 0 |
| 21 | MF | (United States) Lucas Hales | 1 | 0 | 0 | 0 | 0 | 0 | 0 | 0 | 0 | 1 | 0 | 0 |
| 26 | DF | (France) Mael Couteau | 1 | 0 | 0 | 0 | 0 | 0 | 0 | 0 | 0 | 1 | 0 | 0 |
