= Rutter =

Rutter may refer to:

- Rutter (name), a surname of English origin
- Rutter (nautical), a mariner's handbook of sailing directions
- Rutter, Ontario, Canada
- Rutter Group, a publisher of materials for lawyers and judges in the U.S.
- Operation Rutter, code name for the Dieppe Raid in 1942
- Rutter's, an American convenience store chain

== See also ==
- Routier (disambiguation)
