= 2020 Sun Belt Conference men's soccer tournament =

American college soccer postseason tournament

- Classification: Division I
- Teams: 4
- Matches: 3
- Attendance: 973
- Site: Center Parc Stadium; Atlanta, Georgia
- Champions: Coastal Carolina (16th title)
- Winning coach: Shaun Docking (11th title)
- MVP: Tor Saunders (Coastal Carolina)
- Broadcast: ESPN+

2020 Sun Belt Conference men's soccer standings
	Conf.					Overall
Team	W		L		T	W		L		T
No. 23 Coastal Carolina ‡	5	–	1	–	0	6	–	2	–	1
Georgia State	4	–	2	–	0	9	–	2	–	2
Central Arkansas	3	–	3	–	0	4	–	6	–	2
Georgia Southern	0	–	6	–	0	1	–	9	–	0
‡ – 2020 Sun Belt Tournament Champion + – Also invited to the 2020 NCAA tournament Note: † Due to COVID-19, Howard has suspended the 2020 men's soccer season.; As of March 2, 2021; Rankings from United Soccer Coaches

The 2020 Sun Belt Conference men's soccer tournament was the 26th edition of the Sun Belt Conference Men's Soccer Tournament. The tournament decided the Sun Belt Conference (SBC) champion. The tournament began on November 11 and concluded on November 15, 2020.

Georgia State hosted the tournament, which consisted solely of a semifinal and final round. Coastal Carolina successfully defended their SBC Tournament championship, defeating Georgia State in penalties in the final.

The Sun Belt shuttered its men's soccer league after all of its members moved the sport to other conferences by the end of the 2020–21 school year. The conference had lost one men's soccer team before the season when full conference member Appalachian State dropped men's soccer in May 2020, citing financial impacts from COVID-19. That July saw associate member Howard announce that it would become an associate member of the Northeast Conference in six sports, with men's soccer being one of four sports moving in July 2021. In January 2021 the ASUN Conference announced three schools as incoming full members, including Sun Belt men's soccer associate Central Arkansas. The following month saw full Sun Belt member Coastal Carolina announce that it would become a single-sport member of Conference USA, joining another in-state associate member in South Carolina. This left Georgia Southern and Georgia State, both full Sun Belt members, as the conference's only remaining men's soccer programs, and those two schools announced they would move that sport to the Mid-American Conference in late May 2021.

However, following a major conference realignment that brought three new men's soccer schools (James Madison, Marshall, and Old Dominion) to the conference, SBC commissioner Keith Gill announced on November 1, 2021 that men's soccer would be reinstated no later than 2023. With all three schools joining in 2022 instead of the originally intended 2023 timeline, the SBC announced on April 6, 2022 that men's soccer would instead return in 2022.

== Background ==
The tournament served as the culmination of the SBC's regular season, which was extensively modified due to the ongoing COVID-19 pandemic. Four of the five SBC teams played in 2020, under a modified six-match conference season (three home, three away). All teams qualified for the SBC Tournament.

== Seeds ==
Seed	School	Conference	Tiebreaker
1	Coastal Carolina	5–1–0	
2	Georgia State	4–2–0	
3	Central Arkansas	3–3–0	
4	Georgia Southern	0–6–0	

== Bracket ==
Semifinals
1	Coastal Carolina	6
4	Georgia Southern	0
2	Georgia State	1 (4)
3	Central Arkansas	1 (2)

Finals
1	Coastal Carolina	0 (4)
2	Georgia State	0 (3)

== Schedule ==
=== Semifinals ===
November 13, 2020
4:00 p.m.

No. 1 Coastal Carolina	6–0	No. 4 Georgia Southern
Marcelo Lage 30', 64'; Marcello Jones 63', 67'; Esteban Leiva 72', 84'; Ethan Hackenberg (yellow card) 89'	Report	Thomas Jackson (yellow card) 17'

Center Parc Stadium, Atlanta
Attendance: 233
Referee: David Erbacher

November 13, 2020
7:00 p.m.

No. 2 Georgia State	1–1 (a.e.t.)	No. 3 Central Arkansas
Matthew Rios (yellow card) 39'; Jeryn Hodge (yellow card) 64'; Alex Henderson 87'; Simon Carlson (yellow card) 107'	Report	Alberto Suarez 7'; Daishi Uekuri (yellow card) 82'
Penalties
Simon Carlson (penalty scored); Ross Finnie (penalty scored); Matthew Fearnley (penalty scored); George Proctor (penalty scored)	4–2	(penalty scored) Alberto Suarez; (penalty scored) Edoardo Merci; (penalty missed) Kasper Andersen; (penalty missed) Soren Jensen

Center Parc Stadium, Atlanta
Attendance: 328
Referee: Amin Hadzic

=== Final ===
November 15, 2020
1:00 p.m.

No. 1 Coastal Carolina	0–0 (a.e.t.)	No. 2 Georgia State
DZ Harmon (yellow card) 28'; Ethan Hackenberg (yellow card) 110'	Report	Matthew Fearnley (yellow card) 23'; George Proctor (red card) 52'; Carlos Luna (yellow card) 64'
Penalties
Emile Rzepecki (penalty scored); Claudio Repetto (penalty scored); Esteban Leiva (penalty scored); Connor Pugh (penalty missed); DZ Harmon (penalty scored)	4–3	(penalty scored) Simon Carlson; (penalty scored) Ross Finnie; (penalty missed) Matthew Fearnley; (penalty scored) Gunther Rankenburg; (penalty missed) Carlos Luna

Center Parc Stadium, Atlanta
Attendance: 412
Referee: Sergii Demianchuk

== Statistics ==
=== Goalscorers ===
2 Goals

- (England) Marcello Jones – Coastal Carolina
- (United States) Marcelo Lage – Coastal Carolina
- (Costa Rica) Esteban Leiva – Coastal Carolina

1 Goal

- (England) Alex Henderson – Georgia State
- (Spain) Alberto Suarez – Central Arkansas

== Honors ==
=== All Tournament Team ===
- Sam Allardyce, Georgia Southern
- Adam Davie, Georgia Southern
- Matthew Fearnley, Georgia State
- Alex Henderson, Georgia State
- Ole Kjoerholt, Central Arkansas
- Marcello Jones, Coastal Carolina
- Marcelo Lage, Coastal Carolina
- Esteban Leiva, Coastal Carolina
- Ramon, Munoz, Georgia State
- Alberto Suarez, Central Arkansas
- Tor Saunders, Coastal Carolina
