= Routier =

Routier or Routiers may refer to:

- Routier, Aude, a commune in the Aude department in southern France
- Routiers, mercenary soldiers of the Middle Ages
- Les Routiers, a travel guide book publisher
- Carolina Routier (born 1990), a Spanish triathlete
- Darlie Routier (born 1970), an American convicted murderer
- Routier, a fictional character in the video game Record of Agarest War Zero

== See also ==
- Rutter (disambiguation)
