= Dermot McGrane =

English footballer and coach

Personal information
- Place of birth: Leicester, England

College career
Years	Team	Apps	(Gls)
1991–1994	Elmira Soaring Eagles		

Senior career*
Years	Team	Apps	(Gls)
- Lincoln City

Managerial career
- 1995–1997: Western Kentucky Hilltoppers (assistant)
- 1997–2001: Coastal Carolina Chanticleers (assistant)
- 2002–2011: Niagara Purple Eagles
- 2011–2021: Canisius Golden Griffins
- * Club domestic league appearances and goals

Dermot McGrane is an English association football coach and former professional player.

In 2011 McGrane made the decision to coach for Niagara University's rival, the Canisius Golden Griffins. McGrane stayed in this position until 2021, when his contract expired.
