= Coastal Carolina Chanticleers men's soccer =

Men's soccer team of Coastal Carolina University

- 2026 Coastal Carolina Chanticleers men's soccer team
- Founded: 1978; 48 years ago
- University: Coastal Carolina University
- Head coach: Adam Perron (1st season)
- Conference: Sun Belt
- Location: Conway, South Carolina, US
- Stadium: CCU Soccer Complex (capacity: 1,000)
- Nickname: Chants
- Colors: Teal, bronze, and black
Home	Away

NCAA tournament Round of 16
- 1992, 2003, 2012, 2013, 2017

NCAA tournament appearances
- 1992, 1995, 2001, 2002, 2003, 2004, 2005, 2010, 2011, 2012, 2013, 2014, 2015, 2016, 2017, 2019, 2020

Conference tournament championships
- 1986, 1987, 1989, 1990, 1995, 2001, 2003, 2004, 2005, 2010, 2013, 2014, 2016, 2017, 2019, 2020

Conference regular season championships
- 1986, 1987, 1989, 1999, 2000, 2003, 2007, 2009, 2011, 2012, 2013, 2016, 2017, 2020

The Coastal Carolina Chanticleers men's soccer team represents Coastal Carolina University in all NCAA Division I men's college soccer competitions. The team competes in the Sun Belt Conference, following previous tenures in Conference USA and Big South Conference, both of which had been prior conference homes for that ream. During their Big South tenure, the Chanticleers were one of that league's more successful teams, both within the conference and in the NCAA Tournament. In 2003, the Chanticleers became the first Big South team to reach the final sixteen in the tournament.

Despite not having been a Big South member since the 2015 season, the Chanticleers still have the most regular season and tournament championships of any Big South team. The program has won 11 regular season and 12 tournament championships.

The Chanticleers won 4 out of 5 tournament championships during their tenure in Sun Belt men's soccer, with all 4 wins coming against Georgia State.

After the Sun Belt men's soccer league disbanded at the end of the 2020–21 school year, Coastal joined Conference USA (C-USA) for that sport. C-USA was already the men's soccer home of another in-state school, South Carolina, although the latter school's natural in-conference rival is Kentucky, given that Kentucky and South Carolina are full members of the Southeastern Conference. However, following a major conference realignment in 2021 brought several new men's soccer schools to the Sun Belt, that league announced it would reinstate men's soccer no later than 2023. The SBC later announced it would reinstate soccer in 2022, following the arrival of three new full members with men's soccer teams (James Madison, Marshall, Old Dominion).

== Players ==
=== Current roster ===
As of August 20, 2026

Note: Flags indicate national team as defined under FIFA eligibility rules; some limited exceptions apply. Players may hold more than one non-FIFA nationality.

No.	Pos.	Nation	Player
1	GK	USA	Nash Skoglund
2	DF	ENG	Joe Wilcock
3	DF	USA	Patrick Kolano
4	DF	ENG	Theo Butterworth
5	DF	ESP	Hector Blanco
6	MF	ESP	Daniel Fiol
7	MF	USA	Sammy Murphy
8	MF	IRL	Daniel Idiakhoa
9	FW	ARG	Mateo Caride
10	MF	ESP	Alberto de Miguel
11	FW	USA	Patrick Shaw
12	FW	USA	Zach Hult

No.	Pos.	Nation	Player
13	DF	USA	Alvin Depina
16	DF	USA	Jackson Kelley
17	DF	USA	Kyle Pollard
18	MF	USA	Isaac Busenze
19	MF	USA	Pearse O'Brien
20	FW	GHA	Elvis Appiah
21	MF	USA	Brady Schumacher
22	DF	USA	Baxter Hunt
23	MF	ISL	Robert Valdimarsson
24	DF	USA	Parker Sturgis
25	MF	USA	Parker Jackson
30	GK	USA	Will Devine
31	GK	USA	Ben Hertel

=== Notable alumni ===
- (Zimbabwe) Joseph Ngwenya
- (Zimbabwe) Kheli Dube
- (Zimbabwe) Mubarike Chisoni
- (Canada) Jordan Hughes
- (Canada) Tyler Hughes
- (South Africa) Boyzzz Khumalo
- (New Zealand) Stu Riddle
- (Brazil) Pedro Ribeiro
- (England) Tommy Rutter
- (Liberia) DZ Harmon
- (Hong Kong) Oliver Gerbig

== Team management ==
=== Coaching staff ===
Position	Name
Head coach	(United States) Adam Perron
Asst. Coach	(United States) Nick Melville
Asst. Coach	(United States) Will Lukowski
Asst. Coach	(United States) Chay Strine

=== Head coaching history ===
Dates	Name	Notes
1978–1981	(England) Dr. John Farrelly	
1984–1997	(United States) Paul Banta	First NCAA Tournament berth
1997	(England) Dermot McGrane	
1998–2024	(England) Shaun Docking	
2025	(United States) Chris Fidler	
2026–present	(United States) Adam Perron	

=== List of seasons ===
Season	Coach	Record		Notes
Season	Coach	Overall	Conference	Notes
Independent
1978	Dr. John Farrelly	4–11–0	—	
1979	Dr. John Farrelly	10–4–1	—	
1980	Dr. John Farrelly	12–4–2	—	
1981	Dr. John Farrelly	4–12–1	—	
1982	No records	—	—	
1983	No records	—	—	
Big South Conference
1984	Paul Banta	15–8–0	4–3–0	
1985	Paul Banta	14–8–1	5–1–0	
1986	Paul Banta	18–2–0	9–1–0	Big South Regular Season and Tournament Champions
1987	Paul Banta	14–6–1	5–1–0	Big South Regular Season and Tournament Champions
1988	Paul Banta	4–14–4	2–4–0	
1989	Paul Banta	17–4–0	6–0–0	Big South Regular Season and Tournament Champions
1990	Paul Banta	16–3–2	4–2–0	Big South Tournament Champions
1991	Paul Banta	7–8–3	1–4–1	
1992	Paul Banta	16–2–1	0–0–0	NCAA Second Round
1993	Paul Banta	6–12–0	4–4–1	
1994	Paul Banta	10–10–0	5–3–0	
1995	Paul Banta	16–4–0	5–2–0	Big South Tournament Champions NCAA First Round
1996	Paul Banta	7–9–2	3–4–0	
1997	Paul Banta and Dermot McGrane	6–10–1	1–5–1	
1998	Shaun Docking	7–9–2	3–3–0	
1999	Shaun Docking	12–4–1	6–1–0	Big South Regular Season Champions
2000	Shaun Docking	11–5–1	5–2–0	Big South Regular Season Champions
2001	Shaun Docking	11–8–2	3–2–2	Big South Tournament Champions NCAA First Round
2002	Shaun Docking	19–3–2	6–1–0	NCAA Second Round
2003	Shaun Docking	20–2–0	6–1–0	Big South Regular Season and Tournament Champions NCAA Sweet 16
2004	Shaun Docking	14–8–1	4–3–0	Big South Tournament Champions NCAA First Round
2005	Shaun Docking	11–9–1	5–2–0	Big South Tournament Champions NCAA First Round
2006	Shaun Docking	11–7–2	5–2–0	
2007	Shaun Docking	10–8–1	6–0–0	Big South Regular Season Champions
2008	Shaun Docking	10–10–1	5–2–1	
2009	Shaun Docking	9–2–7	5–0–3	Big South Regular Season Champions
2010	Shaun Docking	12–8–2	5–2–1	Big South Tournament Champions NCAA First Round
2011	Shaun Docking	18–4–0	9–0–0	Big South Regular Season Champions NCAA Second Round
2012	Shaun Docking	20–2–2	10–0–0	Big South Regular Season Champions NCAA Sweet 16
2013	Shaun Docking	19–5–0	9–1–0	Big South Regular Season and Tournament Champions NCAA Sweet 16
2014	Shaun Docking	16–6–1	7–1–1	Big South Tournament Champions NCAA Second Round
2015	Shaun Docking	13–3–4	6–1–2	NCAA Second Round
Sun Belt Conference
2016	Shaun Docking	9–6–3	3–1–1	Sun Belt Regular Season and Tournament Champions NCAA Second Round
2017	Shaun Docking	14–7–1	4–1–0	Sun Belt Regular Season and Tournament Champions NCAA Sweet 16
2018	Shaun Docking	10–6–0	2–2–0	
2019	Shaun Docking	10–8–3	3–2–0	Sun Belt Tournament Champions NCAA Second Round
2020	Shaun Docking	6–1–1	5–1–0	Sun Belt Regular Season and Tournament Champions NCAA Second Round
Conference USA
2021	Shaun Docking	6–5–4	3–1–4	
Sun Belt Conference
2022	Shaun Docking	5–5–6	2–1–5	
2023	Shaun Docking	3–9–3	1–6–2	
2024	Shaun Docking	3–10–3	1–5–3	
2025	Chris Fidler	3-9-2	2-6-1	
2026	Adam Perron	7-6-4	4-3-2	

== Stadium ==
Coastal Carolina University Soccer Field is home to CCU's men's and women's soccer programs. In 2003 the facility was the home of the first-ever NCAA Championship event hosted by Coastal Carolina University, as CCU's men's soccer team defeated Davidson, 3–0, in the opening round of the NCAA Men's Soccer Tournament.

== Records and statistics ==
=== NCAA tournament results ===
Year	Opponent	Result
1992	South Carolina	W, 2–0 (2 OT)
1992	Davidson	T, 0–0 (lost 5–6 in PK's)
1995	South Carolina	L, 3–1
2001	Seton Hall	L, 2–1
2002	South Carolina	W, 2–1 (2 OT)
2002	Clemson	T, 1–1 (lost, 4–5 in PK's)
2003	Davidson	W, 3–0
2003	North Carolina	W, 3–0
2003	Santa Clara	L, 3–2 (OT)
2004	Duke	L, 3–0
2005	Clemson	L, 2–0
2010	Duke	L, 2–1
2011	Elon	W, 4–3
2011	North Carolina	L, 3–2
2012	Elon	W, 3–0
2012	Wake Forest	W, 2–1 (OT)
2012	Maryland	L, 5–1
2013	East Tennessee State	W, 2–0
2013	Charlotte	W, 1–0
2013	California	L, 0–1
2014	FGCU	W, 1–0
2014	Clemson	L, 2–1
2015	North Florida	W, 1–0
2015	North Carolina	L, 2–1
2016	Radford	W, 2–1
2016	Wake Forest	L, 2–0
2017	Mercer	W, 1–0
2017	Clemson	W, 3–1
2017	Stanford	L, 2–0
2019	NC State	W, 3–2 (2OT)
2019	SMU	L, 0–1 (2OT)
2020	Wake Forest	L, 2–3

== Honors ==
Big South Conference Coach of the Year

- Paul Banta – 1986, 1987, 1989
- Shaun Docking – 2002, 2003, 2007, 2011, 2012

Big South Conference Player of the Year

- 1990 Guy Norcott
- 1992 Eric Schmitt
- 1999 Mario Benjamin
- 2002 Joseph Ngwenya
- 2003 Joseph Ngwenya
- 2007 Mkhokheli Dube
- 2009 Djamel Bekka

Big South Conference Attacking Player of the Year

- 2011 Ashton Bennett
- 2012 Ashton Bennett
- 2013 Pedro Ribeiro
- 2014 Ricky Garbanzo

Big South Conference Defensive Player of the Year

- 2011 Cyprian Hedrick
- 2012 Kjartan Sigurdsson
- 2013 Shawn McLaws
- 2014 Shawn McLaws
