= Ryan Telfer =

Trinidadian footballer (born 1994)

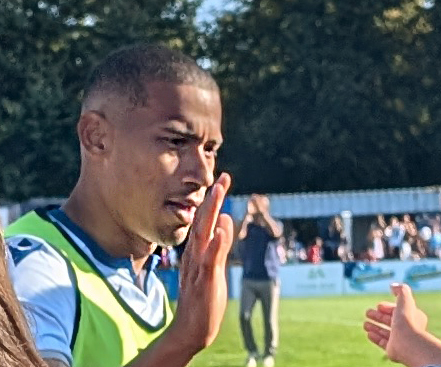
- Telfer with HFX Wanderers FC in 2024

Personal information
- Full name: Ryan Anthony Telfer
- Date of birth: 4 March 1994 (age 32)
- Place of birth: Mississauga, Ontario, Canada
- Height: 1.83 m (6 ft 0 in)
- Position: Winger

Team information
- Current team: HFX Wanderers FC
- Number: 7

Youth career
- Skhy FC
- Brantford City SC
- Erin Mills Eagles

College career
Years	Team	Apps	(Gls)
2015–2016	York Lions	24	(8)

Senior career*
Years	Team	Apps	(Gls)
2012	Mississauga Eagles		
2016	Vaughan Azzurri	5	(1)
2017–2018	Toronto FC II	38	(1)
2018–2019	Toronto FC	16	(1)
2019	→ York9 (loan)	26	(8)
2020	Nea Salamis	3	(0)
2020	York9	7	(0)
2021	Atlético Ottawa	16	(3)
2022	Columbus Crew 2	12	(3)
2023	Miami FC	28	(4)
2024–	HFX Wanderers	69	(8)

International career^{‡}
2019–	Trinidad and Tobago	38	(10)
- * Club domestic league appearances and goals as of October 26, 2026 ‡ National team caps and goals as of 06:00, June 10, 2026

Ryan Anthony Telfer (born 4 March 1994) is a professional footballer who plays as a winger for Canadian Premier League club HFX Wanderers. Born in Canada, he represents Trinidad and Tobago at international level.

== Club career ==
=== Early career ===
Born in Canada, Telfer was raised in Trinidad, where his parents were from, and began playing with Skhy FC. He later returned to Canada and played youth soccer with Erin Mills Eagles, and was eventually signed in 2012 to their senior team the Mississauga Eagles FC in the Canadian Soccer League.

In 2014, he played in the Ontario Soccer League with Erin Mills Eagles, where he finished as the top goalscorer in the Provincial U21 West division.

In 2015, he played at the college level with the York Lions where he won the OUA and CIS championship. Further achievements included receiving OUA West second-team all-star honours and the OUA silver medal. Telfer played with League1 Ontario club Vaughan Azzurri during the 2016 season.

=== Toronto FC II ===
On March 24, 2017 he signed with Toronto FC II of the United Soccer League. He made his debut on March 25, 2017 against Phoenix Rising FC, where he scored the lone goal in a 1–0 victory.

=== Toronto FC ===
On April 13, 2018, Telfer signed with Major League Soccer side Toronto FC. On April 14, 2018, Telfer made his debut for the first team, in a Major League Soccer game against the Colorado Rapids.

On May 18, 2018 Telfer scored his first MLS goal against Orlando City which was the game winner for TFC. Telfer would have his option for the 2020 season declined by Toronto, ending his time with the club after nine seasons. The decision to have the club not pick up his option was a mutual decision between Telfer and the club to provide him with better playing opportunities.

==== Loan to York ====
On March 6, 2019, Telfer was sent on a season-long loan to Canadian Premier League side York9 FC. Telfer scored the first goal in Canadian Premier League history against Forge FC in the league's inaugural match on April 27, 2019, which eventually ended in a 1–1 away draw.

=== Nea Salamis ===
On January 29, 2020, Telfer signed with Cypriot First Division side Nea Salamis.

=== Return to York ===
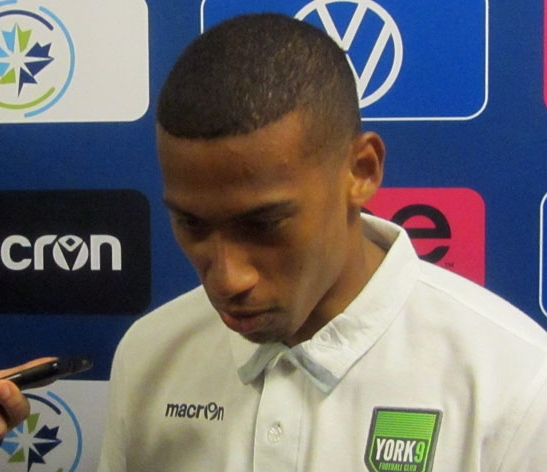
Telfer with York9 in 2019

After leaving Nea Salamis in May 2020 due to the COVID-19 pandemic, Telfer returned to Canada and re-joined York9 on June 3. The contract had various "triggers and incentives" that could extend its length.

=== Atlético Ottawa ===
On April 20, 2021, Telfer signed with Atlético Ottawa. He made his debut for Ottawa in their season opening 2–0 victory over FC Edmonton. Telfer scored his first goal for his new club on August 2, netting the lone Ottawa tally in a 2–1 loss to the HFX Wanderers.

Later in the month on August 29 in a rematch against the Wanderers, Telfer was sent off after a confrontation with the referee and HFX player João Morelli following foul which yielded a yellow card. He was subsequently suspended and sanctioned by Canada Soccer, missing five games. In January 2022 Atlético Ottawa confirmed they had declined Telfer's contract option, ending his time with the club.

=== Columbus Crew 2 ===
On April 1, 2022, Columbus Crew 2 announced that they had signed Telfer. Following the 2022 season, he was released by Columbus.

=== Miami FC ===
In January 2023, he signed with Miami FC of the USL Championship.

=== HFX Wanderers ===
In February 2024, he returned to the Canadian Premier League, signing with the HFX Wanderers. He made his debut on 13 April 2024 against Pacific FC.

== International career ==
Born in Canada, and raised in Trinidad and Tobago, Telfer was eligible for both countries. In August 2019, Canada coach John Herdman mentioned Telfer was a player he was monitoring. However, on September 3, 2019 he was called up to Trinidad and Tobago for two CONCACAF Nations League matches against Martinique.

Telfer made his debut for Trinidad and Tobago in the first match against Martinique three days later on September 6. In the second match on September 9, he scored his first international goal. In June 2021 Telfer was named to Trinidad and Tobago's squad for the 2021 CONCACAF Gold Cup qualification tournament. The team would successfully qualify for the tournament. In June 2023, Telfer was named to Trinidad and Tobago's 23-man squad for the 2023 CONCACAF Gold Cup.

== Career statistics ==
=== Club ===
As of 27 October 2025

Appearances and goals by club, season and competition
Club	Season	League			Playoffs		National cup		League cup		Other		Total	
Club	Season	Division	Apps	Goals	Apps	Goals	Apps	Goals	Apps	Goals	Apps	Goals	Apps	Goals
Vaughan Azzurri	2016	League1 Ontario	5	1	0	0	—		0	0	—		5	1
Toronto FC II	2017	USL Championship	29	1	—		—		—		—		29	1
Toronto FC II	2018	USL Championship	9	0	—		—		—		—		9	0
Toronto FC II	Total		38	1	0	0	0	0	0	0	0	0	38	1
Toronto FC	2018	Major League Soccer	15	1	0	0	4	0	0	0	0	0	19	1
Toronto FC	2019	Major League Soccer	1	0	0	0	—		0	0	0	0	1	1
Toronto FC	Total		16	1	0	0	4	0	0	0	0	0	20	1
York9 (loan)	2019	Canadian Premier League	26	8	—		6	2	—		—		32	10
Nea Salamis	2020	Cypriot First Division	3	0	—		—		—		—		3	0
York9	2020	Canadian Premier League	7	0	—		—		—		—		7	0
Atlético Ottawa	2021	Canadian Premier League	16	3	—		1	0	—		—		17	3
Columbus Crew 2	2022	MLS Next Pro	12	3	3	1	—		—		—		15	4
Miami FC	2023	USL Championship	28	4	—		2	1	—		—		30	5
HFX Wanderers	2024	Canadian Premier League	23	4	—		1	1	—		—		24	5
HFX Wanderers	2024	Canadian Premier League	25	3	1	0	1	0	—		—		27	3
HFX Wanderers	Total		48	7	1	0	2	1	0	0	0	0	51	8
Career total			199	28	4	1	15	4	0	0	0	0	218	33

=== International ===
As of match played June 9, 2026

Appearances and goals by national team and year
National team	Year	Apps	Goals
Trinidad and Tobago	2019	6	3
Trinidad and Tobago	2021	10	2
Trinidad and Tobago	2022	3	2
Trinidad and Tobago	2023	9	2
Trinidad and Tobago	2024	4	1
Trinidad and Tobago	2025	3	0
Trinidad and Tobago	2026	3	0
Total		38	10

Scores and results list Trinidad and Tobago's goal tally first. Score column indicates score after each Telfer goal.

List of international goals scored by Ryan Telfer
No.	Date	Venue	Opponent	Score	Result	Competition
1.	September 9, 2019	Hasely Crawford Stadium, Port of Spain, Trinidad and Tobago	Martinique	2–0	2–2	2019–20 CONCACAF Nations League A
2.	November 10, 2019	Ato Boldon Stadium, Couva, Trinidad and Tobago	Anguilla	1–0	15–0	Friendly
3.	November 10, 2019	Ato Boldon Stadium, Couva, Trinidad and Tobago	Anguilla	5–0	15–0	Friendly
4.	March 25, 2021	Estadio Panamericano, San Cristóbal, Dominican Republic	Guyana	3–0	3–0	2022 FIFA World Cup qualification
5.	July 2, 2021	DRV PNK Stadium, Fort Lauderdale, United States	Montserrat	3–0	6–1	2021 CONCACAF Gold Cup qualification
6.	March 25, 2022	Hasely Crawford Stadium, Port of Spain, Trinidad and Tobago	Barbados	2–0	9–0	Friendly
7.	March 25, 2022	Hasely Crawford Stadium, Port of Spain, Trinidad and Tobago	Barbados	5–0	9–0	Friendly
8.	March 24, 2023	Thomas Robinson Stadium, Nassau, Bahamas	Bahamas	3–0	3–0	2022–23 CONCACAF Nations League B
9.	September 10, 2023	Estadio Jorge "El Mágico" González, San Salvador, El Salvador	El Salvador	1–1	3–2	2023–24 CONCACAF Nations League A
10.	June 5, 2024	Hasely Crawford Stadium, Port of Spain, Trinidad and Tobago	Grenada	1–2	2–2	2026 FIFA World Cup qualification

== Honours ==
=== Club ===
Toronto FC

- Canadian Championship: 2018
