= Rutter (name) =

Rutter is an English surname of Old French origin, introduced into England after the Norman Conquest of 1066.

== Origins and variants ==
The family name Rutter appeared on the early census rolls taken by the Kings of Britain, shortly after the Norman Invasion.

One theory suggests that the surname is French in origin and related to the Old French words roteor, roteeur, routeeur, which are related to playing the rote, an early medieval stringed instrument.

Another theory suggests the surname may be related to the Old French words rotier, routier, meaning robber, highwayman, footpad.

== People with the surname ==
- Adam Rutter (born 1986), Australian racewalker
- Barrie Rutter (born 1946), English actor and theatre director
- Brad Rutter (born 1978), American quiz show host
- Broc Rutter (born 1997), American football player
- Claire Rutter (born 1976), English operatic soprano
- Claude Rutter (born 1928), English retired Anglican priest and former cricketer
- Dale Rutter (born 1972), birth name of American pornographic actor Dale DaBone
- Deborah Rutter, American arts executive
- Eileen Joyce (Joy) Rutter (born 1945), English fantasy writer known by pen name Joy Chant
- Frank Rutter (1876–1937), British art critic, curator and activist
- Georginio Rutter (born 2002), French footballer
- Jane Rutter (born 1958), Australian flautist
- John Rutter (born 1945), English composer and conductor
- Keith Rutter (1931–2021), English footballer
- Lou Rutter (1914–1971), American professional basketball player
- Marshall Rutter (1931–2024), American lawyer and choral music advocate
- Sir Michael Rutter (1933–2021), first English professor of child psychiatry
- Michael Rutter (born 1973), British motorcycle racer
- Owen Rutter (1889–1944), British author
- Peta Rutter (born 1959), New Zealand actress
- Sally Perkins Rutter (1910–1983), birth name of American actress Gale Page
- Samuel Rutter (17th century), Bishop of Sodor and Man
- Steve Rutter (born 1960), English footballer and manager
- Thomas Rutter (1660–1730), British American ironmaster
- Tommy Rutter (born 1977), English footballer
- Tony Rutter (1941–2020), British motorcycle racer
- Washington C. Rutter, (1854–1912), American politician
- William Rutter (MP) (by 1488–1541), English politician
- William J. Rutter (1927–2025), American biochemist, co-founder of biotechnology firm Chiron Corporation

== Fictional characters ==
- Anita Rutter in Anita and Me, 1996 novel and Anita and Me, 2002 film
- Dr Rutter in Incompetence, 2003 novel
