= Shaun Docking =

English soccer coach

Biographical details
- Born: Eastleigh, England
- Education: University of Akron

Playing career
- 1985–1988: Akron Zips
- 1993–1995: Richmond Kickers
- Position: Midfielder Full-back

Coaching career (HC unless noted)
- 1988–1995: Richmond Spiders (assistant)
- 1995: VCU Rams (assistant)
- 1996–1997: Charleston Southern Buccaneers
- 1998–2024: Coastal Carolina Chanticleers

Head coaching record
- Overall: 326-167-52

Accomplishments and honors

Awards
- Lamar Hunt U.S. Open Cup 1995; Big South Coach of the Year 1997 2000 2002 2003 2007 2011 2012; Sun Belt Coach of the Year 2017 2020

Shaun Docking is an English-born American college soccer coach. He formerly coached the Coastal Carolina Chanticleers.

== Playing career ==
Docking played college soccer for the Akron Zips. In his junior year, the Akron Zips were runners up in the 1986 NCAA Division I men's soccer tournament. After his college playing career ended, he would go on to play for the Richmond Kickers while he was an assistant coach on the University of Richmond's men's soccer team.

== Coaching career ==
After graduating from the University of Akron. Docking became an assistant at the University of Richmond, he would serve in that role for 4 seasons. He would then spend one season at across town rival VCU Rams. Following his one season at VCU, he would become the head coach at Charleston Southern, he would take the Buccaneers to the NCAA tournament following a Big South tournament Championship in 1997. Following his successful 1997 campaign, he would become coach of Coastal Carolina. A position he has held since 1998.

Docking is a seven time Big South Coach of the Year, and a two time Sun Belt Coach of the Year.

== Head coaching record ==
Record table
Season	Team	Overall	Conference	Standing	Postseason
Charleston Southern Buccaneers (Big South Conference) (1996–1997)
1996	Charleston Southern	4-14–1	1-5-1	8th	
1997	Charleston Southern	16-5–1	5-2-0	2nd	NCAA 1st Round
Charleston Southern:		20–19–2	6–7–1		
Coastal Carolina Chanticleers (Big South Conference) (1998–2015)
1998	Coastal Carolina	7-9–2	3-3-0	4th	
1999	Coastal Carolina	12-4-1	6-1-0	1st	
2000	Coastal Carolina	11-5-1	5-2-0	1st	
2001	Coastal Carolina	10-8-3	3-2-2	2nd	NCAA 1st Round
2002	Coastal Carolina	19-3-2	6-1-0	1st	NCAA 2nd Round
2003	Coastal Carolina	20-3-0	6-1-0	1st	NCAA 3rd Round
2004	Coastal Carolina	14-8-1	4-3-0	2nd	NCAA 1st Round
2005	Coastal Carolina	11-9-1	5-2-0	3rd	NCAA 1st Round
2006	Coastal Carolina	11-7-2	5-2-0	2nd	
2007	Coastal Carolina	10-8-1	6-0-0	1st	
2008	Coastal Carolina	10-10-1	5-2-1	2nd	
2009	Coastal Carolina	9-2-7	5-0-3	1st	
2010	Coastal Carolina	12-8-2	5-2-1	2nd	NCAA 1st Round
2011	Coastal Carolina	18-4-0	9-0-0	1st	NCAA 2nd Round
2012	Coastal Carolina	20-3-2	10-0-0	1st	NCAA 3rd Round
2013	Coastal Carolina	19-5-0	9-1-0	1st	NCAA 3rd Round
2014	Coastal Carolina	16-6-1	7-1-1	2nd	NCAA 2nd Round
2015	Coastal Carolina	13-3-4	6-1-2	2nd	NCAA 2nd Round
Big South:		242-105-31	105-24-10		
Coastal Carolina Chanticleers (Sun Belt Conference) (2016–2020)
2016	Coastal Carolina	10-7-3	3-1-1	1st	NCAA 2nd Round
2017	Coastal Carolina	14-7-1	4-1-0	1st	NCAA 3rd Round
2018	Coastal Carolina	10-6-0	2-2-0	4th	
2019	Coastal Carolina	10-8-3	3-2-0	2nd	NCAA 2nd Round
2020	Coastal Carolina	9-5-2	5-1-0	1st	NCAA 2nd Round
Coastal Carolina Chanticleers (Conference USA) (2021–2021)
2021	Coastal Carolina	6-5-4	3-1-4	4th	
Conference USA:		6-5-4	3-1-4		
Coastal Carolina Chanticleers (Sun Belt Conference) (2022–present)
2022	Coastal Carolina	5-5-6	2-1-5	5th	
2023	Coastal Carolina	3-9-3	1-6-2	10th	
Sun Belt:		61-47-18	20-14-8		
Coastal Carolina:		309-157-53	128-39-22		
Total:		325-175-55			
National champion Postseason invitational champion Conference regular season champion Conference regular season and conference tournament champion Division regular season champion Division regular season and conference tournament champion Conference tournament champion
