= Aalborghus Gymnasium =

School in Aalborg, Denmark

Coordinates: 57°1′32.81″N 9°56′34.11″E

Aalborghus Gymnasium is an upper secondary school in the city of Aalborg, in North Jutland in Denmark. It offers both the traditional three-year programme and also the two-year programme that prepares students for the Higher Preparatory Examination. The subjects taught at the school include religion, music, Spanish and natural geography. Aalborghus Gymnasium caters to its students' musical and creative side as well as taking an international perspective.

Pupils begin their studies at Aalborghus by selecting a stream, a selection of two or three subjects that will be the focus of their work. For example, a student might choose to specialize in English and Social Studies.
