= Dennis Dowouna =

Ghanaian footballer

Personal information
- Date of birth: 18 May 2000 (age 26)
- Height: 1.81 m (5 ft 11 in)
- Position: Midfielder

Team information
- Current team: Miami
- Number: 18

Youth career
- –2018: Accra Lions

Senior career*
Years	Team	Apps	(Gls)
2018–2020	Tudu Mighty Jets		
2020–2022	Skënderbeu Korçë	38	(1)
2022–	Miami	24	(1)
- * Club domestic league appearances and goals as of 10:10, 21 October 2023 (UTC)

Dennis Dowouna (born 18 May 2000) is a Ghanaian professional footballer currently playing as a midfielder for Miami.

== Career statistics ==
=== Club ===
As of 25 January 2022.

Appearances and goals by club, season and competition
Club	Season	League			Cup		Other		Total	
Club	Season	Division	Apps	Goals	Apps	Goals	Apps	Goals	Apps	Goals
Skënderbeu Korçë	2020–21	Kategoria e Parë	31	1	3 (Note: Appearances in the Albanian Cup)	0	0	0	34	1
Skënderbeu Korçë	2021–22	Kategoria e Parë	7	0	4	0	0	0	11	0
Skënderbeu Korçë	Career total		38	1	7	0	0	0	45	1
Miami	2022	USL Championship	0	0	0	0	0	0	0	0
Career total			38	1	7	0	0	0	45	1
