= Tommy Rutter =

English footballer (born 1977)

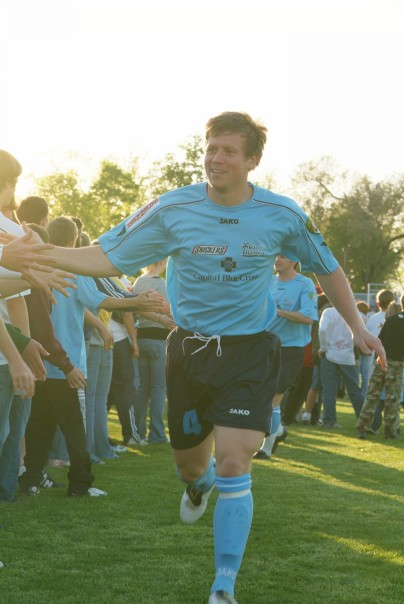
- Tommy Rutter being introduced to City Islander fans

Personal information
- Full name: Thomas Rutter
- Date of birth: 25 March 1977 (age 49)
- Place of birth: Stroud, England
- Height: 5 ft 9 in (1.75 m)
- Position: Defender

Youth career
- 1999–2002: Coastal Carolina University

Senior career*
Years	Team	Apps	(Gls)
2002	Fram Reykjavik	8	(1)
2003	Wilmington Hammerheads	18	(0)
2004	Utah Blitzz	13	(1)
2005–2006	Harrisburg City Islanders	17	(0)
- * Club domestic league appearances and goals

Thomas Rutter (born 25 March 1977) is a former soccer defender.

== Career ==
He started his career in Iceland with Fram Reykjavik, where he played five league games and helped Fram Reykjavik reach the Icelandic cup final, before joining USL Second Division franchise Wilmington Hammerheads in 2003. In his only season with the Hammerheads he helped win the club's one and only national championship. He left after one year to sign for the Utah Blitzz. At the Blitzz Tommy was a part of yet another national championship winning team in 2004. In 2005, Rutter transferred to the Harrisburg City Islanders, where he played for two seasons, making 17 league appearances in total.
