= Claudio Repetto =

Italian footballer (born 1997)

Personal information
- Full name: Claudio Repetto
- Date of birth: 2 February 1997 (age 29)
- Place of birth: Genoa, Italy
- Height: 1.90 m (6 ft 3 in)
- Position: Forward

Youth career
- 2007–2014: Genoa

College career
Years	Team	Apps	(Gls)
2016–2017	Grand View Vikings	?	(18)
2019–2020	Coastal Carolina Chanticleers	29	(7)

Senior career*
Years	Team	Apps	(Gls)
2014–2017	Genoa	0	(0)
2014–2015	→ RapalloBogliasco (loan)	10	(1)
2015–2017	→ Lavagnese (loan)	32	(2)
2017	→ Sestri Levante (loan)	6	(0)
2018	Med City	14	(11)
2019	Ocean City Nor'easters	13	(8)
2021–2022	Charleston Battery	24	(9)
2022	Phoenix Rising	20	(2)
2022–2023	Miami FC	31	(3)
- * Club domestic league appearances and goals as of 19 October 2023

Claudio Repetto (born 2 February 1997) is a retired Italian footballer who played as a forward.

== Career ==
=== Genoa ===
Repetto played as part of the Genoa academy for 10 years, spending time on loan with Serie D clubs RapalloBogliasco, Lavagnese, and Sestri Levante.

=== College and amateur ===
With assistance from USA College Sport, Repetto relocated to the United States in 2017, which was instrumental in paving his way towards securing a position to play college soccer at Grand View University situated in Des Moines, Iowa. During his two seasons with the Vikings, he showcased a strong performance by scoring 18 goals and making 9 assists.

In 2019, after his initial successful stint, he transferred to Coastal Carolina University. Over the next two seasons, he continued his exceptional form by scoring 7 goals and providing 1 assist in 29 appearances. His remarkable performance in 2020 saw him being named to the 2020 USC All-Southeast Region Second Team, and he co-led the Sun Belt in goals, scoring five in 13 games. These achievements contributed to the Chanticleers winning consecutive Sun Belt tournament titles in 2019 and 2020, along with a regular-season title in 2020.

During his college journey, Repetto also showed his mettle in the NPSL, appearing for Med City in 2018, and scored 11 goals in 14 appearances. He had a stint in the USL League Two with Ocean City Nor'easters, where he netted 8 goals in 13 appearances during their 2019 season.

=== Charleston Battery ===
On 25 June 2021, Repetto signed with USL Championship side Charleston Battery. He made his debut for the club the following day, appearing as a 74th-minute substitute during a 3–0 victory over Loudoun United.

Repetto went on to have a successful rookie campaign in Charleston, scoring nine goals and tallying three assists in 24 appearances. Leading the team in scoring, he was named the club's offensive player of the year and newcomer of the year by the supporters for 2021.

=== Phoenix Rising FC ===
Repetto was transferred from Charleston to Phoenix Rising FC and thereafter signed a multi-year contract with Phoenix on February 12, 2022.

=== Miami FC ===
On September 21, 2022, Repetto transferred from Phoenix to Miami FC. Following the 2023 season Repetto was not re-signed by the team and announced his retirement.
