= Conference USA men's soccer tournament =

- Sport: College soccer
- Conference: Conference USA
- Number of teams: 6
- Format: Single-elimination
- Current stadium: Transamerica Field
- Current location: Charlotte, North Carolina
- Played: 1995–2021
- Last contest: 2021
- Current champion: Kentucky
- Most championships: Saint Louis (6)
- TV partner(s): ESPN+, C-USA Digital Network

The Conference USA men's soccer tournament was the conference championship tournament in soccer for Conference USA (C-USA). The tournament was held every year from 1995 until 2021, except 2020. It was a single-elimination tournament and seeding was based on regular season records. The winner, declared conference champion, received the conference's automatic bid to the NCAA Division I men's soccer championship.

C-USA stopped sponsoring men's soccer after the 2021 NCAA Division I men's soccer season when it lost all nine of its members due to conference realignment. In April 2022, it was announced that five of its members (Coastal Carolina, Kentucky, Marshall, Old Dominion, and South Carolina) would join the Sun Belt Conference for the fall 2022 season, as would West Virginia, which had previously announced a planned move of men's soccer from the Mid-American Conference to C-USA. One month later, the remaining four members (Charlotte, FIU, Florida Atlantic, and UAB) announced they would join the American Athletic Conference effective fall 2022.

== Format ==
The top eight (6) teams determined by points following the regular season will qualify for a single-elimination tournament. The top two seeds will receive a bye. Competition dates are set for Wednesday, Friday and Sunday to allow a day between quarterfinals, semifinals and the championship final.

== Champions ==
=== Finals ===
Key

- (1) – Title number
- a.e.t. – Match went to extra time
- p – Match decided by a penalty shootout after extra time

Ed.	Year	Champion	Score	Runner-up	Venue	City
1	1995	Saint Louis	2–0	Charlotte	Valley Fields	Milwaukee, WI
2	1996	USF	2–1	Marquette	USF Soccer Stadium	Tampa, FL
3	1997	Saint Louis	3–1 (a.e.t.)	USF	USF Soccer Stadium	Tampa, FL
4	1998	USF	4–2	Memphis	USF Soccer Stadium	Tampa, FL
5	1999	UAB	4–0	Saint Louis	West Campus Field	Birmingham, AL
6	2000	Saint Louis	2–1	UAB	Hermann Stadium	St. Louis, MO
7	2001	Saint Louis	2–0	Marquette	USF Soccer Stadium	Tampa, FL
8	2002	Saint Louis	3–2	Cincinnati	Hermann Stadium	St. Louis, MO
9	2003	Saint Louis	2–2 (5–4 p)	Charlotte	Mike Rose Complex	Memphis, TN
10	2004	Memphis	3–2	UAB	Cardinal Park Stadium	Louisville, KY
11	2005	South Carolina	1–0	Tulsa	Westcott Field	University Park, TX
12	2006	SMU	2–0	Kentucky	Hurricane Soccer Stadium	Tulsa, OK
13	2007	Tulsa	3–2	FIU	West Campus Field	Birmingham, AL
14	2008	Tulsa	1–1 (4–2 p)	Kentucky	Westcott Field	University Park, TX
15	2009	Tulsa	3–0	Marshall	Hurricane Soccer Stadium	Tulsa, OK
16	2010	South Carolina	1–0 (a.e.t.)	Tulsa	Mike Rose Complex	Memphis, TN
17	2011	SMU	2–0	UAB	Hurricane Soccer Stadium	Tulsa, OK
18	2012	Tulsa	5–0	SMU	Regions Park	Hoover, AL
19	2013	Charlotte	1–0	Tulsa	Transamerica Field	Charlotte, NC
20	2014	Old Dominion	2–1	South Carolina	ODU Soccer Complex	Norfolk, VA
21	2015	FIU	1–0	Marshall	Transamerica Field	Charlotte, NC
22	2016	New Mexico	3–0	FIU	Veterans Soccer Complex	Huntington, WV
23	2017	Old Dominion	1–0	Charlotte	ODU Soccer Complex	Norfolk, VA
24	2018	Kentucky	1–0	Charlotte	Transamerica Field	Charlotte, NC
25	2019	Marshall	1–0 (a.e.t.)	Charlotte	ODU Soccer Complex	Norfolk, VA
–	2020	(Canceled due to the COVID-19 pandemic)				
26	2021	Kentucky	2–1 (a.e.t.)	Florida Atlantic	Transamerica Field	Charlotte, NC

=== By school ===
School	App.	Titles	Title years
Charlotte	15	1	2013
Coastal Carolina	1	0	
Cincinnati	10	0	
DePaul	4	0	
FIU	8	1	2015
Florida Atlantic	2	0	
Kentucky	15	2	2018, 2021
Louisville	8	0	
Marquette	7	0	
Marshall	10	1	2019
Memphis	12	1	2004
New Mexico	5	1	2016
Old Dominion	5	2	2014, 2017
Saint Louis	10	6	1995, 1997, 2000, 2001, 2002, 2003
SMU	7	2	2006, 2011
South Carolina	12	2	2005, 2010
Tulsa	8	4	2007, 2008, 2009, 2012
UAB	21	1	1999
UCF	5	0	
South Florida	9	2	1996, 1998
