= 2011 Conference USA men's soccer tournament =

2011 C-USA men's soccer tournament

Tournament details
- Country: United States
- Dates: 9–13 November 2011
- Teams: 6

Final positions
- Champions: SMU (2nd title)
- Runners-up: UAB

Tournament statistics
- Matches played: 5
- Goals scored: 18 (3.6 per match)
- Top goal scorer: 2 players (3 goals)

The 2011 Conference USA men's soccer tournament was the seventeenth edition of the Conference USA Men's Soccer Tournament. The tournament decided the Conference USA champion and guaranteed representative into the 2011 NCAA Division I Men's Soccer Championship. The tournament was hosted by the University of Tulsa and the games were played at the Hurricane Soccer & Track Stadium.

== Bracket ==
Quarterfinals; Wednesday Nov. 9
4	Marshall	3
5	SMU	4
3	UCF	4^{OT}
6	Memphis	3

Semifinals; Friday Nov. 11
1	South Carolina	0
5	SMU	1
3	UCF	0
2	UAB	1

Final; Sunday Nov. 13
5	SMU	2
2	UAB	0

== Schedule ==
=== Quarterfinals ===
November 9 Match 1	Marshall	3–4	SMU	Tulsa, Oklahoma
5:00 PM CST (UTC-06)	Jackson 18'; Risher 56', 79'	Report	Ivo 14', 69' (pen.), 76'; Engel 62'	Stadium: Hurricane Soccer & Track Stadium; Attendance: 40; Referee: Rizal Milliken

November 9 Match 2	UCF	4–3 (a.e.t.)	Memphis	Tulsa, Oklahoma
7:30 PM CST (UTC-06)	Tulloch 13', 62', 95'; Reed 21'	Report	Lewis 19'; Shannon 41' (pen.); Gagnon 89'	Stadium: Hurricane Soccer & Track Stadium; Attendance: 77; Referee: Shane Butler

=== Semifinals ===
November 11 Match 3	South Carolina	0–1	SMU	Tulsa, Oklahoma
5:00 PM CST (UTC-06)		Report	Hill 27'	Stadium: Hurricane Soccer & Track Stadium; Attendance: 104; Referee: Jorge Hernandez

November 11 Match 4	UCF	0–1	UAB	Tulsa, Oklahoma
7:30 PM CST (UTC-06)		Report	Sodade 12'	Stadium: Hurricane Soccer & Track Stadium; Attendance: 109; Referee: Jorge Luna Hernandez

=== Final ===
November 13 Match 5	SMU	2–0	UAB	Tulsa, Oklahoma
1:00 PM CST (UTC-06)	Hill 34'; Simmons 59'	Report		Stadium: Hurricane Soccer & Track Stadium; Attendance: 311; Referee: David Jaworski

== Statistics ==
=== Goalscorers ===
Rank	Player	Team	Goals
1	Arthur Ivo	SMU	3
1	McKauly Tulloch	UCF	3
3	Matt Risher	Marshall	2
3	Ben Hill	SMU	2
5	Tom Jackson	Marshall	1
5	Lewis Ellis	Memphis	1
5	Chandler Gagnon	Memphis	1
5	Thomas Shannon	Memphis	1
5	Tyler Engel	SMU	1
5	Aaron Simmons	SMU	1
5	Babayele Sodade	UAB	1
5	Malcom Reed	UCF	1

== Awards ==
=== All-Tournament team ===
- Arthur Ivo, SMU (Offensive MVP)
- Diogo de Almeida, SMU (Defensive MVP)
- Jaime Ibarra, SMU
- T.J. Nelson, SMU
- Vance Benson, South Carolina
- Eric Martinez, South Carolina
- Mladen Lemez, UAB
- Babayele Sodade, UAB
- Carl Woszczyski, UAB
- Andrew Quintana, UCF
- McKauly Tulloch, UCF
