= 1995 Conference USA men's soccer tournament =

1995 C-USA men's soccer tournament
Tournament details
- Country: United States
- Dates: 8–12 November 1995
- Teams: 9

Final positions
- Champions: Saint Louis (1st title)
- Runners-up: Charlotte

Tournament statistics
- Matches played: 8
- Goals scored: 21 (2.63 per match)

The 1995 Conference USA men's soccer tournament was the first edition of the Conference USA Men's Soccer Tournament. The tournament decided the Conference USA champion and guaranteed representative into the 1995 NCAA Division I Men's Soccer Championship. The tournament was hosted by Marquette University and the games were played at Valley Fields.

== Bracket ==
First Round; Wednesday Nov. 8
9	Louisville	3
8	DePaul	0

Quarterfinals; Thursday Nov. 9
1	UAB	2
9	Louisville	0
4	Charlotte	2
5	Marquette	1
2	Saint Louis	1
7	Memphis	0
3	USF	3
6	Cincinnati	0

Semifinals; Friday Nov. 10
1	UAB	0
4	Charlotte	2
2	Saint Louis	3
3	USF	2

Final; Sunday Nov. 12
4	Charlotte	0
2	Saint Louis	2

== Awards ==
Most Valuable Midfielder:

- Jacob Thomas, Saint Louis

Most Valuable Forward:

- Matt McKeon, Saint Louis

Most Valuable Defender:

- Mike Franks, Charlotte

Most Valuable Goalkeeper:

- Jon Busch, Charlotte
