= 1996 Conference USA men's soccer tournament =

1996 C-USA men's soccer tournament
Tournament details
- Country: United States
- Dates: 5–17 November 1996
- Teams: 9

Final positions
- Champions: USF (1st title)
- Runners-up: Marquette

Tournament statistics
- Matches played: 8
- Goals scored: 16 (2 per match)

The 1996 Conference USA men's soccer tournament was the second edition of the Conference USA Men's Soccer Tournament. The tournament decided the Conference USA champion and guaranteed representative into the 1996 NCAA Division I Men's Soccer Championship. The tournament was hosted by the University of South Florida and the final games were played at USF Soccer Stadium.

== Bracket ==
First Round; Tuesday Nov. 5
8	Louisville	0
9	Cincinnati	1^{OT}

Quarterfinals; Tuesday Nov. 12
1	Charlotte	0
9	Cincinnati	1^{OT}
4	UAB	0
5	Marquette	2
2	USF	2
7	DePaul	0
3	Saint Louis	0
6	Memphis	1

Semifinals; Friday Nov. 15
9	Cincinnati	1
5	Marquette	2
2	USF	3
6	Memphis	0

Final; Sunday Nov. 17
5	Marquette	1
2	USF	2

== Awards ==
Most Valuable Midfielder:

- Mike Mekelburg, USF

Most Valuable Forward:

- Jeff Cunningham, USF

Most Valuable Defender:

- Scott Ziemba, Marquette

Most Valuable Goalkeeper:

- Jim Welch, Marquette
