= 2005 Conference USA men's soccer tournament =

2005 C-USA men's soccer tournament
Tournament details
- Country: United States
- Dates: 9–13 November 2005
- Teams: 8

Final positions
- Champions: South Carolina (1st title)
- Runners-up: Tulsa

Tournament statistics
- Matches played: 7
- Goals scored: 16 (2.29 per match)
- Top goal scorer: Kyle Brown (3 goals)

The 2005 Conference USA men's soccer tournament was the eleventh edition of the Conference USA Men's Soccer Tournament. The tournament decided the Conference USA champion and guaranteed representative into the 2005 NCAA Division I Men's Soccer Championship. The tournament was hosted by Southern Methodist University and the games were played at Westcott Field.

== Bracket ==
Quarterfinals; Wednesday Nov. 9
6	Memphis	2
3	UAB	1
7	Kentucky	0(0)
2	South Carolina	0(3)
5	Marshall	2
4	FIU	0
8	Tulsa	2(5)
1	SMU	2(4)

Semifinals; Friday Nov. 11
6	Memphis	1
2	South Carolina	2
5	Marshall	0
8	Tulsa	3

Final; Sunday Nov. 13
2	South Carolina	1
8	Tulsa	0

== Schedule ==
=== Quarterfinals ===
November 9 Match 1	Memphis	2–1	UAB	University Park, Texas
12:00 PM CST (UTC-06)	Harkins 29'; Sheringham 81' (o.g.)	Report	McLaughlin 67'	Stadium: Westcott Field; Referee: Ryan Cigich

November 9 Match 2	Kentucky	0–0 (a.e.t.) (0–3 p)	South Carolina	University Park, Texas
2:30 PM CST (UTC-06)		Report		Stadium: Westcott Field; Attendance: 325; Referee: Shane Butler
	Penalties
	Li (penalty missed); Turnbull (penalty missed); Lara (penalty missed)		(penalty scored) Leeton; (penalty scored) Sambursky; (penalty scored) Alcala

November 9 Match 3	Marshall	2–0	FIU	University Park, Texas
5:00 PM CST (UTC-06)	Flores 39'; Ademolu 72'	Report		Stadium: Westcott Field; Referee: Antony Vasoli

November 9 Match 4	Tulsa	2–2 (a.e.t.) (5–4 p)	SMU	University Park, Texas
7:30 PM CST (UTC-06)	Wasson 52'; Brown 75' (pen.)	Report	da Silva 53'; Saintus 73'	Stadium: Westcott Field; Attendance: 1,073; Referee: Abdu Bensalah

=== Semifinals ===
November 11 Match 5	Memphis	1–2	South Carolina	University Park, Texas
5:00 PM CST (UTC-06)	Harkins 6'	Report	Akinsete 6'; Deter 61'	Stadium: Westcott Field; Referee: Abdu Bensalah

November 11 Match 6	Marshall	0–3	Tulsa	University Park, Texas
7:30 PM CST (UTC-06)		Report	Brown 62', 68'; Lange 79'	Stadium: Westcott Field; Attendance: 325; Referee: Shane Butler

=== Final ===
November 13 Match 7	South Carolina	1–0	Tulsa	University Park, Texas
1:00 PM CST (UTC-06)	Sambursky 40'	Report		Stadium: Westcott Field; Attendance: 340; Referee: Lou Labbadia

== Statistics ==
=== Goalscorers ===
Rank	Player	Team	Goals
1	Kyle Brown	Tulsa	3
2	Tripp Harkins	Memphis	2
3	Nick Ademolu	Marshall	1
3	Osric Flores	Marshall	1
3	Paulo da Silva	SMU	1
3	Dario Saintus	SMU	1
3	Ayo Akinsete	South Carolina	1
3	Ryan Deter	South Carolina	1
3	Mike Sambursky	South Carolina	1
3	Jonathan Lange	Tulsa	1
3	Daniel Wasson	Tulsa	1
3	Jason McLaughlin	UAB	1

Own goal

- Robert Sheringham (UAB scored for Memphis)

== Awards ==
=== All-Tournament team ===
- Michael Coburn, Memphis
- Tripp Harkins, Memphis
- Nick Ademolu, Marshall
- Jeremy Ashe, Marshall
- Kyle Brown, Tulsa
- Lawson Vaughn, Tulsa
- Daniel Wasson, Tulsa
- Mike Gustavson, South Carolina
- Ryan Leeton, South Carolina
- Ralph Pace, South Carolina
- Eric Szeszycki, South Carolina
