= 2004 Conference USA men's soccer tournament =

2004 C-USA men's soccer tournament
Tournament details
- Country: United States
- Dates: 12–14 November 2004
- Teams: 6

Final positions
- Champions: Memphis (1st title)
- Runners-up: UAB

Tournament statistics
- Matches played: 5
- Goals scored: 11 (2.2 per match)

The 2004 Conference USA men's soccer tournament was the tenth edition of the Conference USA Men's Soccer Tournament. The tournament decided the Conference USA champion and guaranteed representative into the 2004 NCAA Division I Men's Soccer Championship. The tournament was hosted by the University of Louisville and the games were played at Cardinal Park Stadium.

== Bracket ==
Quarterfinals; Friday Nov. 12
4	USF	0
5	Saint Louis	2
3	Cincinnati	0
6	Charlotte	2

Semifinals; Saturday Nov. 13
1	Memphis	1
5	Saint Louis	0
2	UAB	1^{2OT}
6	Charlotte	0

Final; Sunday Nov. 14
1	Memphis	3
2	UAB	2

== Awards ==
=== All-Tournament team ===
- Josh Beachem, Charlotte
- John Nabers, Charlotte
- Daniel Dobson, Memphis
- Justin Dyer, Memphis
- Marcus McCarty, Memphis
- John Reilly, Memphis
- Brett Branan, Saint Louis
- Alex Matteson, Saint Louis
- Sandy Gbandi, UAB
- Jason McLaughlin, UAB
- Rogerio Oliveira, UAB
