= 2010 Conference USA men's soccer tournament =

2010 C-USA men's soccer tournament

Tournament details
- Country: United States
- Dates: 10–14 November 2010
- Teams: 6

Final positions
- Champions: South Carolina (2nd title)
- Runners-up: Tulsa

Tournament statistics
- Matches played: 5
- Goals scored: 15 (3 per match)
- Top goal scorer: 3 players (2 goals)

The 2010 Conference USA men's soccer tournament was the sixteenth edition of the Conference USA Men's Soccer Tournament. The tournament decided the Conference USA champion and guaranteed representative into the 2010 NCAA Division I Men's Soccer Championship. The tournament was hosted by the University of Memphis and the games were played at the Mike Rose Soccer Complex.

== Bracket ==
Quarterfinals; Wednesday Nov. 10
4	South Carolina	2
5	UAB	1
3	Kentucky	0
6	Tulsa	5

Semifinals; Friday Nov. 12
1	SMU	1
4	South Carolina	2
6	Tulsa	2
2	UCF	1

Final; Sunday Nov. 14
4	South Carolina	1^{aet gg}
6	Tulsa	0

== Schedule ==
=== Quarterfinals ===
November 10 Match 1	South Carolina	2–1	UAB	Memphis, Tennessee
5:00 PM CST (UTC-06)	Morrissey 27'; Brettschneider 82'	Report	16' (o.g.)	Stadium: Mike Rose Soccer Complex; Referee: Rizal Milliken

November 10 Match 2	Kentucky	0–5	Tulsa	Memphis, Tennessee
7:30 PM CST (UTC-06)		Report	McInnes 15'; Albertson 56'; Mata 77'; Gonsalves 79'; Wright 87'	Stadium: Mike Rose Soccer Complex; Attendance: 277; Referee: Jorge Luna Hernandez

=== Semifinals ===
November 12 Match 3	SMU	1–2	South Carolina	Memphis, Tennessee
5:00 PM CST (UTC-06)	Ivo 30'	Report	Brettschneider 45'; Traynor 50'	Stadium: Mike Rose Soccer Complex; Referee: David Jaworski

November 12 Match 4	Tulsa	2–1	UCF	Memphis, Tennessee
7:30 PM CST (UTC-06)	McInnes 5'; Christiansen 61'	Report	Keown-Robson 32'	Stadium: Mike Rose Soccer Complex; Attendance: 329; Referee: Timothy Debysingh

=== Final ===
November 14 Match 5	South Carolina	1–0 (a.e.t.)	Tulsa	Memphis, Tennessee
1:00 PM CST (UTC-06)	Morrissey 107' (pen.)	Report		Stadium: Mike Rose Soccer Complex; Attendance: 467; Referee: Misail Tsopas

== Statistics ==
=== Goalscorers ===
Rank	Player	Team	Goals
1	Blake Brettschneider	South Carolina	2
1	Stephen Morrisse	South Carolina	2
1	Ashley McInnes	Tulsa	2
4	Arthur Ivo	SMU	1
4	Will Traynor	South Carolina	1
4	Corey Albertson	Tulsa	1
4	Hunter Christiansen	Tulsa	1
4	Blaine Gonsalves	Tulsa	1
4	Omar Mata	Tulsa	1
4	Jon Wright	Tulsa	1
4	Nick Keown-Robson	UCF	1

Own goal

- (UAB scored for South Carolina)

== Awards ==
=== All-Tournament team ===
- Craig Hill, SMU
- Arthur Ivo, SMU
- Blake Brettschneider, South Carolina
- Stephen Morrissey, South Carolina
- Kevin Stam, South Carolina
- Will Traynor, South Carolina
- Hunter Christiansen, Tulsa
- Jake Dobkins, Tulsa
- Ashley McInnes, Tulsa
- Warren Creavalle, UCF
- Camilo Rendon, UCF
