= 1998 Conference USA men's soccer tournament =

1998 C-USA men's soccer tournament
Tournament details
- Country: United States
- Dates: 3–15 November 1998
- Teams: 9

Final positions
- Champions: USF (2nd title)
- Runners-up: Memphis

Tournament statistics
- Matches played: 8
- Goals scored: 21 (2.63 per match)

The 1998 Conference USA men's soccer tournament was the fourth edition of the Conference USA Men's Soccer Tournament. The tournament decided the Conference USA champion and guaranteed representative into the 1998 NCAA Division I Men's Soccer Championship. The tournament was hosted by the University of South Florida and the final games were played at the USF Soccer Stadium.

== Bracket ==
First Round; Tuesday Nov. 3
8	Louisville	1
9	DePaul	0

Quarterfinals; Sat., Sun. Nov. 7–8
1	USF	2
8	Louisville	1
4	Charlotte	1(4)
5	Cincinnati	1(3)
2	Saint Louis	0
7	Memphis	1^{OT}
3	UAB	1
6	Marquette	3^{2OT}

Semifinals; Friday Nov. 13
1	USF	1
4	Charlotte	0
7	Memphis	3
6	Marquette	0

Final; Sunday Nov. 15
1	USF	4
7	Memphis	2

== Awards ==
Most Valuable Midfielder:

- Jeff Houser, USF

Most Valuable Forward:

- Kevin Alvero, USF

Most Valuable Defender:

- Ryan Schwaigert, Memphis

Most Valuable Goalkeeper:

- Skip Miller, USF
