= 1999 Conference USA men's soccer tournament =

1999 C-USA men's soccer tournament
Tournament details
- Country: United States
- Dates: 11–14 November 1999
- Teams: 6

Final positions
- Champions: UAB (1st title)
- Runners-up: Saint Louis

Tournament statistics
- Matches played: 5
- Goals scored: 18 (3.6 per match)

The 1999 Conference USA men's soccer tournament was the fifth edition of the Conference USA Men's Soccer Tournament. The tournament decided the Conference USA champion and guaranteed representative into the 1999 NCAA Division I Men's Soccer Championship. The tournament was hosted by the University of Alabama at Birmingham and the games were played at West Campus Field.

== Bracket ==
Quarterfinals; Thursday Nov. 11
4	Louisville	0
5	USF	2
3	Marquette	1
6	Cincinnati	2

Semifinals; Friday Nov. 12
1	UAB	4
5	USF	0
2	Saint Louis	3^{4OT}
6	Cincinnati	2

Final; Sunday Nov. 14
1	UAB	4
2	Saint Louis	0

== Awards ==
Most Valuable Midfielder:

- Jeff DiMaria, Saint Louis

Most Valuable Forward:

- Peter Byaruhanga, UAB

Most Valuable Defender:

- Ned Crancer, UAB

Most Valuable Goalkeeper:

- David Clemente, UAB
