= 2009 Conference USA men's soccer tournament =

2009 C-USA men's soccer tournament

Tournament details
- Country: United States
- Dates: 13–15 November 2009
- Teams: 4

Final positions
- Champions: Tulsa (3rd title)
- Runners-up: Marshall

Tournament statistics
- Matches played: 3
- Goals scored: 6 (2 per match)
- Top goal scorer: Austin Neil (3 goals)

The 2009 Conference USA men's soccer tournament was the fifteenth edition of the Conference USA Men's Soccer Tournament. The tournament decided the Conference USA champion and guaranteed representative into the 2009 NCAA Division I Men's Soccer Championship. The tournament was hosted by the University of Tulsa and the games were played at the Hurricane Soccer & Track Stadium.

== Bracket ==
Semifinals; Friday Nov. 13
3	UAB	0(3)
2	Marshall	0(4)
4	Kentucky	1
1	Tulsa	2

Final; Sunday Nov. 15
2	Marshall	0
1	Tulsa	3

== Schedule ==
=== Semifinals ===
November 13 Match 1	UAB	0–0 (a.e.t.) (3–4 p)	Marshall	Tulsa, Oklahoma
5:00 PM CST (UTC-06)		Report		Stadium: Hurricane Soccer & Track Stadium; Referee: Timothy Debysingh
	Penalties
	Gumede (penalty scored); Sawchak (penalty scored); Williams (penalty missed); Sodade (penalty scored); Gyawu (penalty missed)		(penalty missed) Dawes; (penalty scored) Jackson; (penalty scored) Perkins; (penalty scored) Hunter; (penalty scored) Hembree

November 13 Match 2	Kentucky	1–2	Tulsa	Tulsa, Oklahoma
7:30 PM CST (UTC-06)	Davis 69'	Report	Neil 9', 59'	Stadium: Hurricane Soccer & Track Stadium; Attendance: 750; Referee: Misail Tsapos

=== Final ===
November 15 Match 3	Marshall	0–3	Tulsa	Tulsa, Oklahoma
1:00 PM CST (UTC-06)		Report	Chavez 3'; Neil 14'; Parada 63'	Stadium: Hurricane Soccer & Track Stadium

== Statistics ==
=== Goalscorers ===
Rank	Player	Team	Goals
1	Austin Neil	Tulsa	3
2	George Davis IV	Kentucky	1
2	Justin Chavez	Tulsa	1
2	Jose Parada	Tulsa	1

== Awards ==
=== All-Tournament team ===
- George Davis IV, Kentucky
- Dan Williams, Kentucky
- Dustin Dawes, Marshall
- Tom Jackson, Marshall
- Devin Perkins, Marshall
- Andy Aguilar, Tulsa
- Ashley McInnes, Tulsa
- Austin Neil, Tulsa
- Chris Taylor, Tulsa
- Two-Boys Gumede, UAB
- Carl Woszczynski, UAB
