= 2003 Conference USA men's soccer tournament =

2003 C-USA men's soccer tournament
Tournament details
- Country: United States
- Dates: 13–16 November 2003
- Teams: 6

Final positions
- Champions: Saint Louis (6th title)
- Runners-up: Charlotte

Tournament statistics
- Matches played: 5
- Goals scored: 17 (3.4 per match)

The 2003 Conference USA men's soccer tournament was the ninth edition of the Conference USA Men's Soccer Tournament. The tournament decided the Conference USA champion and guaranteed representative into the 2003 NCAA Division I Men's Soccer Championship. The tournament was hosted by the University of Memphis and the games were played at the Mike Rose Soccer Complex.

== Bracket ==
Quarterfinals; Thursday Nov. 13
4	Charlotte	2
5	USF	1
3	Louisville	1
6	UAB	2^{OT}

Semifinals; Friday Nov. 14
1	Cincinnati	0
4	Charlotte	1
2	Saint Louis	5
6	UAB	1

Final; Sunday Nov. 16
4	Charlotte	2(4)
2	Saint Louis	2(5)

== Awards ==
=== All-Tournament team ===
- Floyd Franks, Charlotte
- Joe Lampert, Charlotte
- Lucas Macknos, Charlotte
- Tim Brown, Cincinnati
- Josh Gardner, Cincinnati
- Nick Gannon, Saint Louis
- Martin Hutton, Saint Louis
- Vedad Ibišević, Saint Louis
- Andy Pusateri, Saint Louis
- Leandro de Oliveira, UAB
- Jason McLaughlin, UAB
