= 2008 Conference USA men's soccer tournament =

2008 C-USA men's soccer tournament
Tournament details
- Country: United States
- Dates: 12–16 November 2008
- Teams: 8

Final positions
- Champions: Tulsa (2nd title)
- Runners-up: Kentucky

Tournament statistics
- Matches played: 7
- Goals scored: 21 (3 per match)
- Top goal scorer: 3 players (2 goals)

The 2008 Conference USA men's soccer tournament was the fourteenth edition of the Conference USA Men's Soccer Tournament. The tournament decided the Conference USA champion and guaranteed representative into the 2008 NCAA Division I Men's Soccer Championship. The tournament was hosted by Southern Methodist University and the games were played at Westcott Field.

== Bracket ==
Quarterfinals; Wednesday Nov. 12
7	Marshall	2
2	Kentucky	4
3	Memphis	0
6	UCF	1
1	Tulsa	4
8	UAB	2
4	SMU	0
5	South Carolina	3

Semifinals; Friday Nov. 14
2	Kentucky	1
6	UCF	0
1	Tulsa	2
5	South Carolina	0

Final; Sunday Nov. 16
2	Kentucky	1(2)
1	Tulsa	1(4)

== Schedule ==
=== Quarterfinals ===
November 12 Match 1	Marshall	2–4	Kentucky	University Park, Texas
12:00 PM CST (UTC-06)	Cooley 69'; LaCrone 81'	Report	Burns 6'; Tappel 15'; Strong 33', 72'	Stadium: Westcott Field; Referee: Shane Butler

November 12 Match 2	Memphis	0–1	UCF	University Park, Texas
2:30 PM CST (UTC-06)		Report	McEntee 2'	Stadium: Westcott Field; Referee: Rizal Milliken

November 12 Match 3	Tulsa	4–2	UAB	University Park, Texas
5:30 PM CST (UTC-06)	Parada 7'; McInnes 13', 87'; Taylor 64'	Report	Gumede 3' (pen.); Rios 63'	Stadium: Westcott Field; Referee: Tim Debysingh

November 12 Match 4	SMU	0–3	South Carolina	University Park, Texas
8:00 PM CST (UTC-06)		Report	Brettschneider 25'; Lowder 45'; Arthur 78'	Stadium: Westcott Field; Attendance: 477; Referee: Abdul Bensalah

=== Semifinals ===
November 14 Match 5	Kentucky	1–0	UCF	University Park, Texas
5:00 PM CST (UTC-06)	Rice 66'	Report		Stadium: Westcott Field; Referee: Tony DeLois

November 14 Match 6	Tulsa	2–0	South Carolina	University Park, Texas
7:30 PM CST (UTC-06)	Neil 54'; Sandez 89'	Report		Stadium: Westcott Field; Attendance: 323; Referee: Misail Tsapos

=== Final ===
November 16 Match 7	Kentucky	1–1 (a.e.t.) (2–4 p)	Tulsa	University Park, Texas
1:00 PM CST (UTC-06)	Dos Santos 6'	Report	Parada 6'	Stadium: Westcott Field; Attendance: 255; Referee: David Jaworsky
	Penalties
	Griffiths (penalty missed); Dos Santos (penalty missed); Kanth (penalty scored); Tappel (penalty scored)		(penalty scored) Henriquez; (penalty scored) McInnes; (penalty missed) Taylor; (penalty scored) DeFreitas; (penalty scored) Chavez

== Statistics ==
=== Goalscorers ===
Rank	Player	Team	Goals
1	Michael Strong	Kentucky	2
1	Jose Parada	Tulsa	2
1	Ashley McInnes	Tulsa	2
2	Tyler Burns	Kentucky	1
2	Marco Dos Santos	Kentucky	1
2	Barry Rice	Kentucky	1
2	C.J. Tappel	Kentucky	1
2	Jira Cooley	Marshall	1
2	Kolby LaCrone	Marshall	1
2	Sam Arthur	South Carolina	1
2	Blake Brettschneider	South Carolina	1
2	Bryan Lowder	South Carolina	1
2	Austin Neil	Tulsa	1
2	Jeovahnni Sandez	Tulsa	1
2	Chris Taylor	Tulsa	1
2	Two-Boys Gumede	UAB	1
2	Derek Rios	UAB	1
2	Kyle McEntee	UCF	1

== Awards ==
=== All-Tournament team ===
- Dan Williams, Kentucky
- Tim Crone, Kentucky
- Jason Griffiths, Kentucky
- Blake Brettschneider, South Carolina
- Jimmy Maurer, South Carolina
- Eric DeFreitas, Tulsa
- Ashley McInnes, Tulsa
- Joe Salem, Tulsa
- Yaron Bacher, UCF
- Kevan George, UCF
