= 1997 Conference USA men's soccer tournament =

1997 C-USA men's soccer tournament
Tournament details
- Country: United States
- Dates: 4–16 November 1997
- Teams: 9

Final positions
- Champions: Saint Louis (2nd title)
- Runners-up: USF

Tournament statistics
- Matches played: 8
- Goals scored: 24 (3 per match)

The 1997 Conference USA men's soccer tournament was the third edition of the Conference USA Men's Soccer Tournament. The tournament decided the Conference USA champion and guaranteed representative into the 1997 NCAA Division I Men's Soccer Championship. The tournament was hosted by the University of South Florida and the final games were played at the USF Soccer Stadium.

== Bracket ==
First Round; Tuesday Nov. 4
8	Memphis	3
9	DePaul	1

Quarterfinals; Sat., Sun. Nov. 8–9
1	USF	4
8	Memphis	2
4	UAB	0
5	Charlotte	2
2	Marquette	2^{4OT}
7	Cincinnati	1
3	Saint Louis	1
6	Louisville	0

Semifinals; Friday Nov. 14
1	USF	2
5	Charlotte	0
2	Marquette	0
3	Saint Louis	2

Final; Sunday Nov. 16
1	USF	1
3	Saint Louis	3^{OT}

== Awards ==
Most Valuable Midfielder:

- Kevin Quigley, Saint Louis

Most Valuable Forward:

- Tim Leonard, Saint Louis

Most Valuable Defender:

- Kevin Kalish, Saint Louis

Most Valuable Goalkeeper:

- Casey Klipfel, Saint Louis
