= 2012 Conference USA men's soccer tournament =

2012 C-USA men's soccer tournament
Tournament details
- Country: United States
- Dates: 7–11 November 2012
- Teams: 6

Final positions
- Champions: Tulsa (4th title)
- Runners-up: SMU

Tournament statistics
- Matches played: 5
- Goals scored: 15 (3 per match)
- Top goal scorer: 2 players (2 goals)

The 2012 Conference USA men's soccer tournament was the eighteenth edition of the Conference USA Men's Soccer Tournament. The tournament decided the Conference USA champion and guaranteed representative into the 2012 NCAA Division I Men's Soccer Championship. The tournament was hosted by the University of Alabama at Birmingham and the games were played at Regions Park.

== Bracket ==
Quarterfinals; Wednesday Nov. 7
4 | Memphis | 0
5 | Kentucky | 1
3 | UCF | 1
6 | UAB | 3

Semifinals; Friday Nov. 9
1 | SMU | 2(4)
5 | Kentucky | 2(1)
6 | UAB | 0
2 | Tulsa | 1^{2OT}

Final; Sunday Nov. 11
1 | SMU | 0
2 | Tulsa | 5

== Schedule ==
=== Quarterfinals ===
| November 7 Match 1 | Memphis | 0–1 | Kentucky | Hoover, Alabama |
| 5:00 PM CST (UTC-06) | | Report | Kemper 75' | Stadium: Regions Park; Referee: Rizal Milliken |

| November 7 Match 2 | UCF | 1–3 | UAB | Hoover, Alabama |
| 7:30 PM CST (UTC-06) | Lamberta 45' | Report | Wickham 19', 42'; Navarrete 52' | Stadium: Regions Park; Attendance: 357; Referee: Shane Butler |

=== Semifinals ===
| November 9 Match 3 | SMU | 2–2 (a.e.t.) (4–1 p) | Kentucky | Hoover, Alabama |
| 5:00 PM CST (UTC-06) | Morales 28'; Castillo 75' | Report | Wilder 3'; Conelian 61' | Stadium: Regions Park; Referee: Misali Tsapos |
| | Penalties |
| | Lujano (penalty scored); Puskarich (penalty scored); Morales (penalty scored); King (penalty scored) | | (penalty missed) Pettys; (penalty scored) Lodge; (penalty missed) Bordon |

| November 9 Match 4 | UAB | 0–1 (a.e.t.) | Tulsa | Hoover, Alabama |
| 7:30 PM CST (UTC-06) | | Report | Wright 107' | Stadium: Regions Park; Attendance: 440; Referee: Jorge Luna |

=== Final ===
| November 11 Match 5 | SMU | 0–5 | Tulsa | Hoover, Alabama |
| 1:00 PM CST (UTC-06) | | Report | Matamoros 20'; Barrett 27', 64'; Mata 45'; Follensbee 68' | Stadium: Regions Park; Attendance: 251; Referee: Dave Jasorski |

== Statistics ==
=== Goalscorers ===
| Rank | Player | Team | Goals |
|---|---|---|---|
| 1 | Akeil Barrett | Tulsa | 2 |
| 1 | Chase Wickham | UAB | 2 |
| 3 | Gabriel Conelian | Kentucky | 1 |
| 3 | Jacob Kemper | Kentucky | 1 |
| 3 | Cameron Wilder | Kentucky | 1 |
| 3 | Juan Castillo | SMU | 1 |
| 3 | Andrew Morales | SMU | 1 |
| 3 | Bryce Follensbee | Tulsa | 1 |
| 3 | Cristian Mata | Tulsa | 1 |
| 3 | Abe Matamoros | Tulsa | 1 |
| 3 | Jon Wright | Tulsa | 1 |
| 3 | Diego Naverrete | UAB | 1 |
| 3 | Steven Lamberta | UCF | 1 |

== Awards ==
=== All-Tournament team ===
- Steven Perinovic, Kentucky
- Cameron Wilder, Kentucky
- Juan Castillo, SMU
- Andrew Morales, SMU
- T.J. Nelson, SMU
- Akeil Barrett, Tulsa
- Jake Dobkins, Tulsa
- Mark Pais, Tulsa
- Tony Rocha, Tulsa
- Raphael Ville, UAB
- Chase Wickham, UAB
