= 2002 Conference USA men's soccer tournament =

2002 C-USA men's soccer tournament
Tournament details
- Country: United States
- Dates: 14–17 November 2002
- Teams: 6

Final positions
- Champions: Saint Louis (5th title)
- Runners-up: Cincinnati

Tournament statistics
- Matches played: 5
- Goals scored: 17 (3.4 per match)

The 2002 Conference USA men's soccer tournament was the eighth edition of the Conference USA Men's Soccer Tournament. The tournament decided the Conference USA champion and guaranteed representative into the 2002 NCAA Division I Men's Soccer Championship. The tournament was hosted by Saint Louis University and the games were played at Hermann Stadium.

== Bracket ==
Quarterfinals; Thursday Nov. 14
4	USF	2
5	Cincinnati	3
3	Louisville	1
6	UAB	0

Semifinals; Friday Nov. 15
1	Marquette	1(1)
5	Cincinnati	1(3)
2	Saint Louis	3
6	Louisville	1

Final; Saturday Nov. 17
5	Cincinnati	2
2	Saint Louis	3

== Awards ==
=== All-Tournament team ===
- Tim Brown, Cincinnati
- Brandon Dobbs, Cincinnati
- Wiremu Patrick, Cincinnati
- Matt Neely, Louisville
- Brad Sokolowski, Louisville
- Steve Lawrence, Marquette
- Mike Robards, Marquette
- Jason Cole, Saint Louis
- Andy Pusateri, Saint Louis
- Nick Walls, Saint Louis
- Kevin Wickart, Saint Louis
