= 2014 Conference USA men's soccer tournament =

2014 C-USA men's soccer tournament

Tournament details
- Country: United States
- Dates: 12–16 November 2014
- Teams: 7

Final positions
- Champions: Old Dominion (1st title)
- Runners-up: South Carolina

Tournament statistics
- Matches played: 6
- Goals scored: 14 (2.33 per match)
- Top goal scorer: Sidney Rivera (4 goals)

The 2014 Conference USA men's soccer tournament was the twentieth edition of the Conference USA Men's Soccer Tournament. The tournament decided the Conference USA champion and guaranteed a representative into the 2014 NCAA Division I Men's Soccer Championship. The tournament was hosted by Old Dominion University and the games were played at the Old Dominion Soccer Complex.

== Bracket ==
Quarterfinals; Wednesday Nov. 12
4	Old Dominion	2
5	New Mexico	1
2	Kentucky	1
7	South Carolina	2
3	UAB	1
6	Marshall	0

Semifinals; Friday Nov. 14
1	Charlotte	1
4	Old Dominion	2
7	South Carolina	1
3	UAB	0

Final; Sunday Nov. 16
4	Old Dominion	2
7	South Carolina	1

== Schedule ==
=== Quarter-finals ===
November 12 Match 1	Kentucky	1–2	South Carolina	Norfolk, Virginia
2:00 PM EST (UTC-05)	Tollefsen 31' (pen.)	Report	Kaba 51'; Millard 90'	Stadium: Old Dominion Soccer Complex; Referee: Chris Penso

November 12 Match 2	UAB	1–0	Marshall	Norfolk, Virginia
4:30 PM EST (UTC-05)	Dajani 34'	Report		Stadium: Old Dominion Soccer Complex; Referee: Chico Grajeda

November 12 Match 3	Old Dominion	2–1	New Mexico	Norfolk, Virginia
7:00 PM EST (UTC-05)	Rivera 75', 85'	Report	Wehan 39'	Stadium: Old Dominion Soccer Complex; Attendance: 1,013; Referee: Andy Chapin

=== Semi-finals ===
November 14 Match 4	South Carolina	1–0	UAB	Norfolk, Virginia
4:30 PM EST (UTC-05)	Knudsen 68'	Report		Stadium: Old Dominion Soccer Complex; Referee: Andy Chapin

November 14 Match 5	Charlotte	1–2	Old Dominion	Norfolk, Virginia
7:00 PM EST (UTC-05)	Parker 68'	Report	Macsicza 2'; Rivera 90'	Stadium: Old Dominion Soccer Complex; Attendance: 708; Referee: Chico Grejada

=== Final ===
November 16 Match 6	Old Dominion	2–1	South Carolina	Norfolk, Virginia
2:00 PM EST (UTC-05)	Rivera 19'; Hill 75'	Report	Torda 82'	Stadium: Old Dominion Soccer Complex; Attendance: 1,139; Referee: Msrk Gorak

== Statistics ==
=== Goalscorers ===
Rank	Player	Team	Goals
1	Sidney Rivera	Old Dominion	4
2	Kyle Parker	Charlotte	1
2	Kristopher Tollefsen	Kentucky	1
2	Chris Wehan	New Mexico	1
2	Geoffrey Hill	Old Dominion	1
2	David Macsicza	Old Dominion	1
2	Mahamoudou Kaba	South Carolina	1
2	Mikkel Knudsen	South Carolina	1
2	Koty Millard	South Carolina	1
2	Jeffrey Torda	South Carolina	1
2	Rami Dajani	UAB	1

== Awards ==
=== All-Tournament team ===
- Sidney Rivera, Old Dominion (Offensive MVP)
- David Macsicza, Old Dominion (Defensive MVP)
- Ryan Condotta, Old Dominion
- Jesse Miralrio, Old Dominion
- Mahamoudou Kaba, South Carolina
- Mikkel Knudsen, South Carolina
- Braeden Troyer, South Carolina
- Marco Velez, South Carolina
- Kyle Parker, Charlotte
- Darion Copeland, UAB
- Rami Dajani, UAB
