= 2000 Conference USA men's soccer tournament =

2000 C-USA men's soccer tournament
Tournament details
- Country: United States
- Dates: 9–12 November 2000
- Teams: 6

Final positions
- Champions: Saint Louis (3rd title)
- Runners-up: UAB

Tournament statistics
- Matches played: 5
- Goals scored: 16 (3.2 per match)

The 2000 Conference USA men's soccer tournament was the sixth edition of the Conference USA Men's Soccer Tournament. The tournament decided the Conference USA champion and guaranteed representative into the 2000 NCAA Division I Men's Soccer Championship. The tournament was hosted by Saint Louis University and the games were played at Hermann Stadium.

== Bracket ==
Quarterfinals; Thursday Nov. 9
4	Memphis	2
5	Cincinnati	1
3	Charlotte	1
6	Louisville	2^{OT}

Semifinals; Friday Nov. 10
1	Saint Louis	3
4	Memphis	2
2	UAB	2
6	Louisville	0

Final; Sunday Nov. 12
1	Saint Louis	2
2	UAB	1

== Awards ==
Most Valuable Midfielder:

- Brad Davis, Saint Louis

Most Valuable Forward:

- Nick Walls, Saint Louis

Most Valuable Defender:

- Joe Hammes, Saint Louis

Most Valuable Goalkeeper:

- David Clemente, UAB
