= 2001 Conference USA men's soccer tournament =

2001 C-USA men's soccer tournament
Tournament details
- Country: United States
- Dates: 15–18 November 2001
- Teams: 6

Final positions
- Champions: Saint Louis (4th title)
- Runners-up: Marquette

Tournament statistics
- Matches played: 5
- Goals scored: 19 (3.8 per match)

The 2001 Conference USA men's soccer tournament was the seventh edition of the Conference USA Men's Soccer Tournament. The tournament decided the Conference USA champion and guaranteed representative into the 2001 NCAA Division I Men's Soccer Championship. The tournament was hosted by the University of South Florida and the games were played at the USF Soccer Stadium.

== Bracket ==
Quarterfinals; Thursday Nov. 15
4	Charlotte	2^{(11)}
5	Cincinnati	2^{(10)}
3	USF	1
6	Marquette	2

Semifinals; Friday Nov. 16
1	Saint Louis	4
4	Charlotte	1
2	UAB	1
6	Marquette	4

Final; Saturday Nov. 18
1	Saint Louis	2
6	Marquette	0

== Awards ==
Most Valuable Midfielder:

- Brad Davis, Saint Louis

Most Valuable Forward:

- Dipsy Selolwane, Saint Louis

Most Valuable Defender:

- Marty Tappel, Saint Louis

Most Valuable Goalkeeper:

- John Politis, Saint Louis
