= Old Dominion Soccer Complex =

Soccer stadium at Old Dominion University

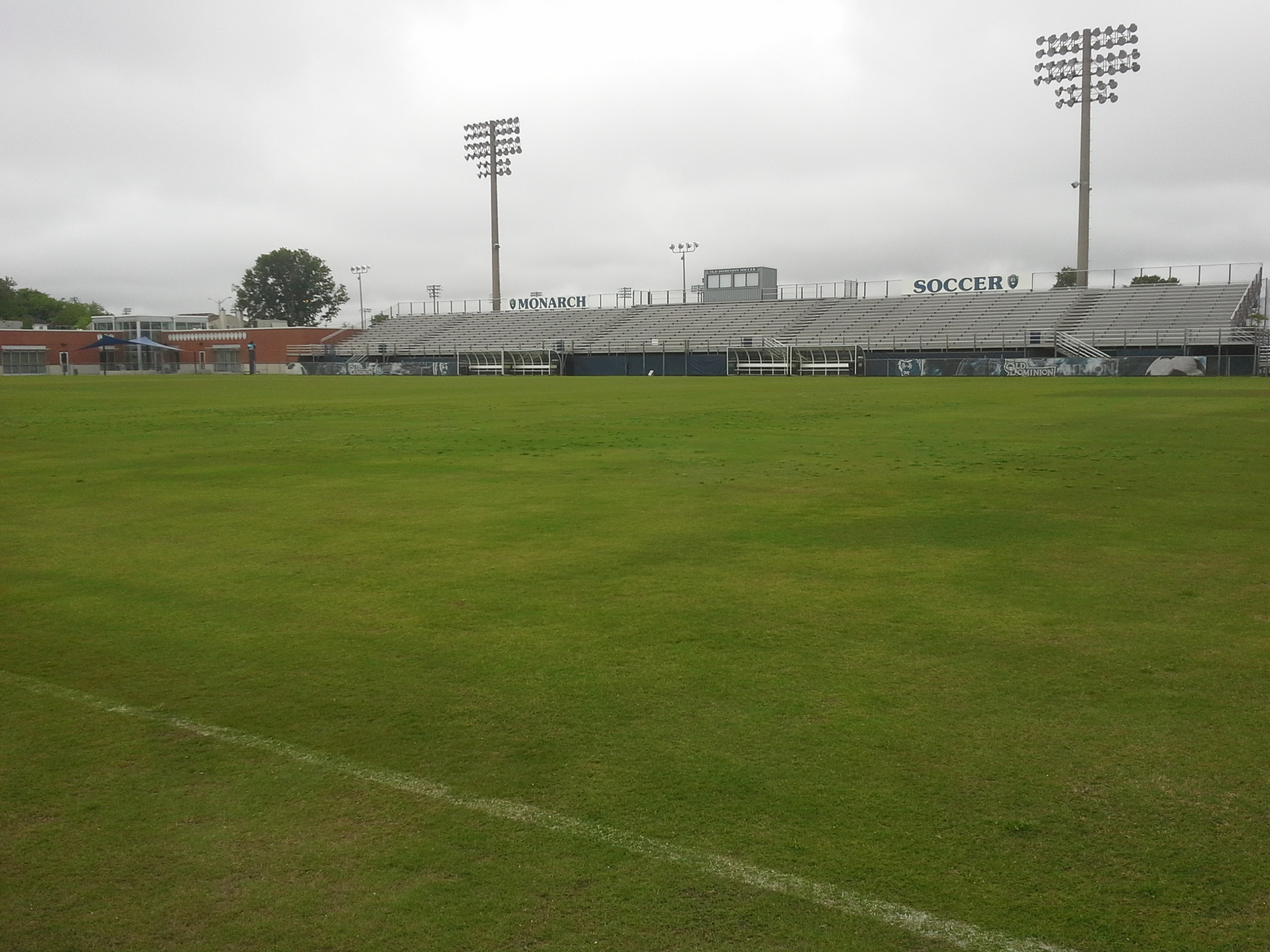
- View of the stadium in 2013
- Interactive map of Old Dominion Soccer Complex
- Former names: ODU Soccer Stadium
- Address: Norfolk, VA; United States
- Location: 1500 West 43rd Street
- Coordinates: 36°53′02″N 76°18′39″W
- Owner: Old Dominion University
- Operator: Old Dominion Univ. Athletics
- Capacity: 4,000
- Type: Soccer-specific stadium
- Surface: Natural grass
- Scoreboard: Electronic
- Field size: 380 feet (120 m) x 245 feet (75 m)
- Current use: Soccer

Construction
- Opened: 1990; 36 years ago

Tenants
- Old Dominion Monarchs (NCAA) teams: men's and women's soccer

Website
- odusports.com/soccer-complex

The Old Dominion Soccer Complex is a soccer-specific stadium located on the campus of Old Dominion University in Norfolk, Virginia, USA. The 4,000-seat stadium is home to the Old Dominion Monarchs soccer teams. The Monarchs compete in the Sun Belt Conference. The stadium is also the host of the annual Stihl/ODU Soccer Classic.

The stadium opened in 1990 replacing the university's football stadium, Foreman Field, as the home of Old Dominion soccer. The opening game was a 1–1 tie against the College of William and Mary with 3200 fans in attendance. Between the 2002 and 2005 seasons, the Monarchs men's soccer team had a 32 match regular season unbeaten streak at the complex. The stadium has hosted the 1991, 1992, and 2005 Colonial Athletic Association Men's Soccer Tournaments, along with NCAA College Cup games in 2002, 2003, 2004, 2005, 2006, 2007, 2011, 2012, 2013, 2017. The complex has also hosted the 2014 and 2017 Conference USA Men's Soccer Tournaments which were both won by the home standing Monarchs.
