= Will Traynor =

American soccer player

Personal information
- Full name: William Traynor
- Date of birth: February 24, 1989 (age 37)
- Place of birth: St. Charles, Missouri, United States
- Height: 6 ft 2 in (1.88 m)
- Position: Defender

Youth career
- 2007–2010: South Carolina Gamecocks

Senior career*
Years	Team	Apps	(Gls)
2011	Rochester Rhinos	4	(0)
- * Club domestic league appearances and goals as of July 20, 2013

Will Traynor (born February 24, 1989, in St. Charles, Missouri) is an American soccer player.

== Career ==
=== College and amateur ===
Traynor attended Francis Howell North High School, played in the Region II Olympic Development Program and Missouri state teams, and played club soccer for the Scott Gallagher club, before going on to play four years of college soccer at the University of South Carolina.

He earned Second Team ESPN The Magazine Academic All-District III accolades as a sophomore in 2008, won the team's Bill Lauritzen Memorial Award and the Coaches' Award, was named to the Conference USA All-Academic Team as a junior in 2009, and was named to the All-Conference USA First-Team, the ESPN Academic All-District III First Team, the ESPN Academic All-American Third-Team, the C-USA All-Academic Team, the Conference USA All-Tournament Team and the NSCAA All-South Third Team following his senior year in 2010. He finished his collegiate career with 10 goals and two assists in 76 games for the Gamecocks.

=== Professional ===
Undrafted out of college, Traynor signed his first professional contract on February 22, 2011, when he signed with USL Professional Division club Rochester Rhinos. He made his professional debut on May 27, 2011, in a 1–1 tie with the Wilmington Hammerheads.

== Personal life ==
Will's brother, Jack Traynor, is also a professional soccer player. Will is married to his college sweet heart, All-American for University of South Carolina's Women's Soccer, Brittiny Rhoades.
