= West Campus Field =

Soccer stadium in Birmingham, Alabama

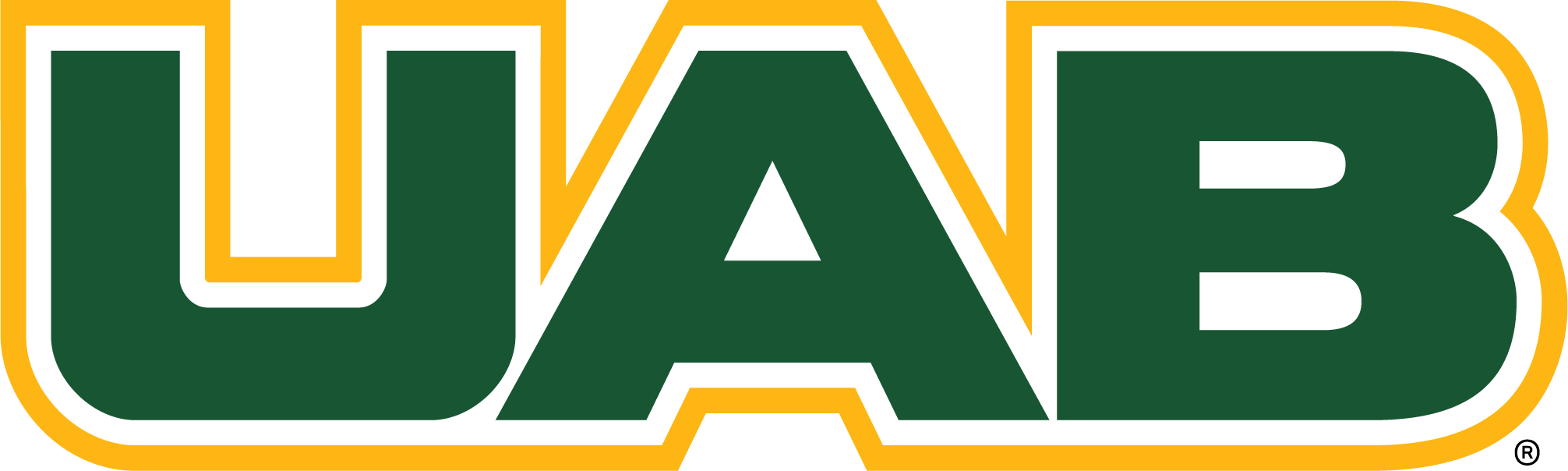

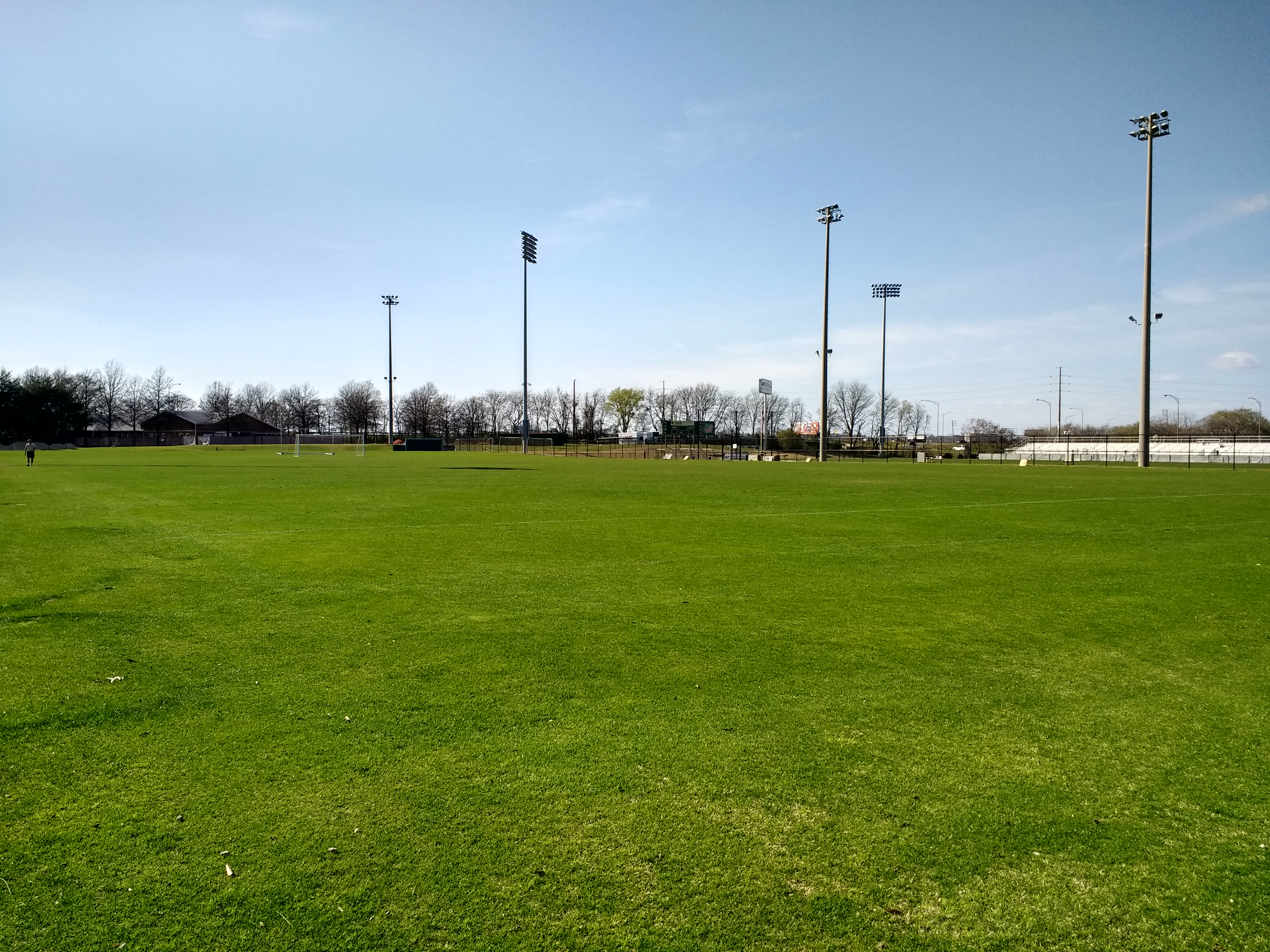
- View of the field in 2017
- Interactive map of West Campus Field
- Location: 11th Street South; Birmingham, AL
- Coordinates: 33.497197°N 86.812119°W
- Owner: University of Alabama at Birmingham
- Operator: Univ. of Alabama Athletics
- Capacity: 2,500
- Type: Soccer-specific stadium
- Surface: Grass

Construction
- Opened: 1993; 33 years ago
- Expanded: 1999

Tenants
- UAB Blazers (NCAA) teams: men's & women's soccer

West Campus Field was a soccer-specific stadium located in Birmingham, Alabama, United States, on the campus of the University of Alabama at Birmingham (UAB) that served as the home field for both the UAB Blazers men's and women's college soccer teams. The 1,500-seat stadium, with an overall capacity of 2,500, was built in 1993.

The largest men's soccer regular season crowd to ever see a game at the facility was 3,141 on August 27, 2011, to see the Blazers defeat the Clemson Tigers in their 2011 home opener.

The facility hosted the Conference USA Men's Soccer Tournament in 1999 and 2007.
