= Valley Fields =

Stadium in Milwaukee, Wisconsin

Coordinates: 43°1′55″N 87°56′10″W

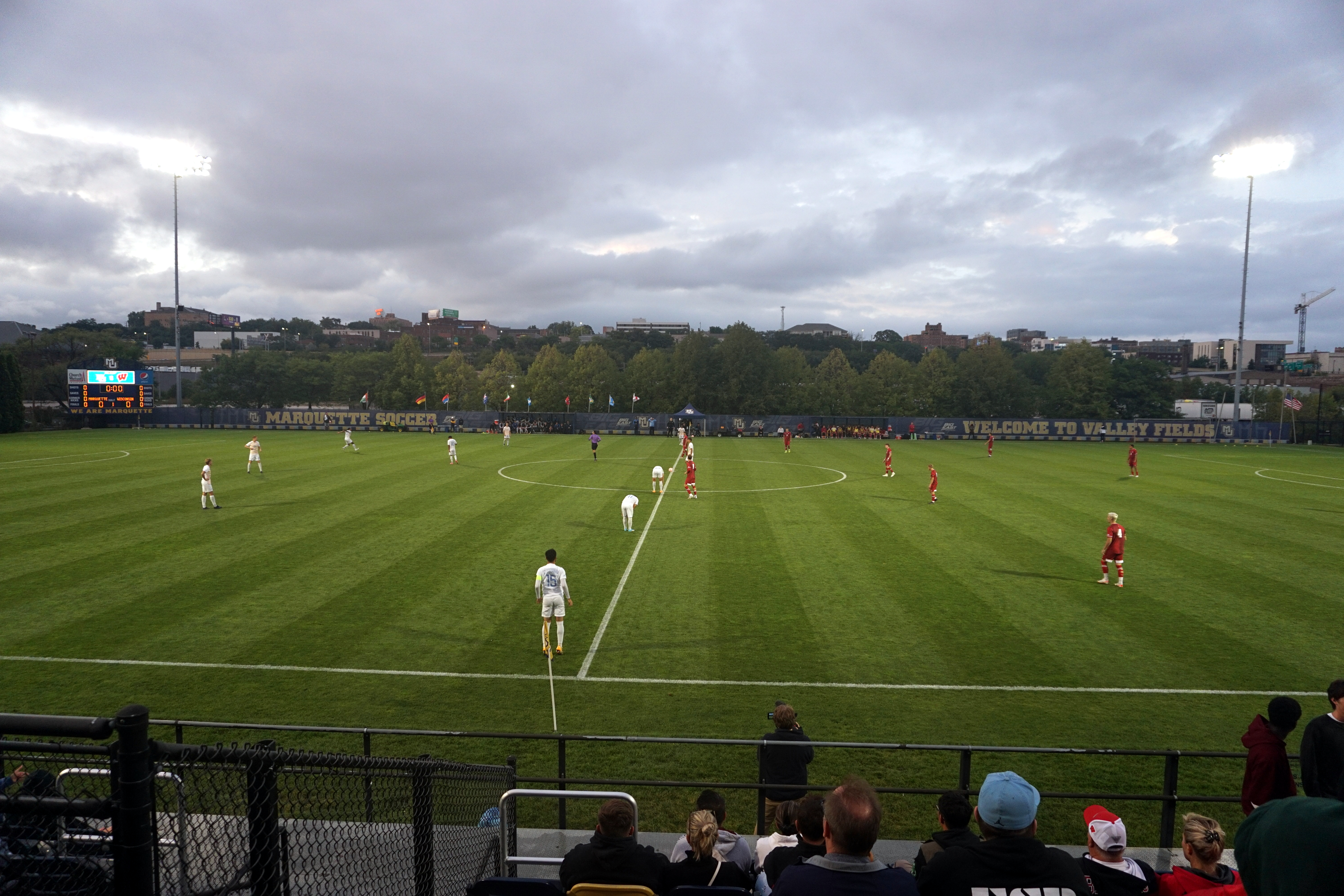
- The stadium in a Marquette v Wisconsin soccer game in 2023
- Interactive map of Valley Fields
- Address: 1818 W. Canal St. Milwaukee, WI; United States
- Owner: Marquette University
- Operator: Marquette Univ. Athletics
- Capacity: 1,750
- Type: Stadium
- Current use: Soccer; Lacrosse; Track and field
- Public transit: MCTS

Construction
- Opened: 1993; 33 years ago
- Cost: $8 million

Tenants
- Marquette Golden Eagles (NCAA) teams: men's and women's soccer; men's and women's lacrosse

Website
- gomarquette.com/valley-fields

Valley Fields is a 1,750-seat outdoor stadium and practice facility in Milwaukee, Wisconsin, primarily used by the varsity men's and women's soccer and lacrosse teams at Marquette University, all of which compete in the Big East Conference. The complex houses bleachers, locker rooms, practice fields and a main stadium.

== Facilities ==
The complex opened in 1993 as a soccer-specific stadium, but renovations to the turf and the addition of locker rooms have taken place since. The complex is named for its location in the Menomonee Valley, which sits along the banks of the Menomonee River in downtown Milwaukee, south of the main Marquette University campus and north of the Potawatomi Hotel & Casino complex. Adjacent to Valley Fields is Marquette's Shimek Track and Field Facility, which hosts the school's cross country and track and field teams.

In addition to use by NCAA teams, Valley Fields hosts intramural and club competitions and is open to Marquette students for general outdoor recreation.

The soccer stadium renovation was completed in March 2014, including new seating and a press box.

In 2017, Marquette inaugurated a seasonal air-supported dome structure over the middle FieldTurf field for winter practices and sports. The $3.6 million structure was funded by a handful of anonymous donors along with an athletic department surplus built up over several years. The dome will be used by Marquette varsity lacrosse, soccer, golf and track teams in addition to intramural and club sports.

== Future Use ==
In 2022, Marquette sold land northeast of the Marquette Interchange to developers intending to construct an 8,000-seat soccer stadium as part of a larger sports, entertainment and housing development. As part of the deal, Marquette's soccer and lacrosse teams are expected to play games at the new stadium, while still utilizing Valley Fields as a practice facility.
