= Hurricane Soccer & Track Stadium =

Stadium in Tulsa, Oklahoma

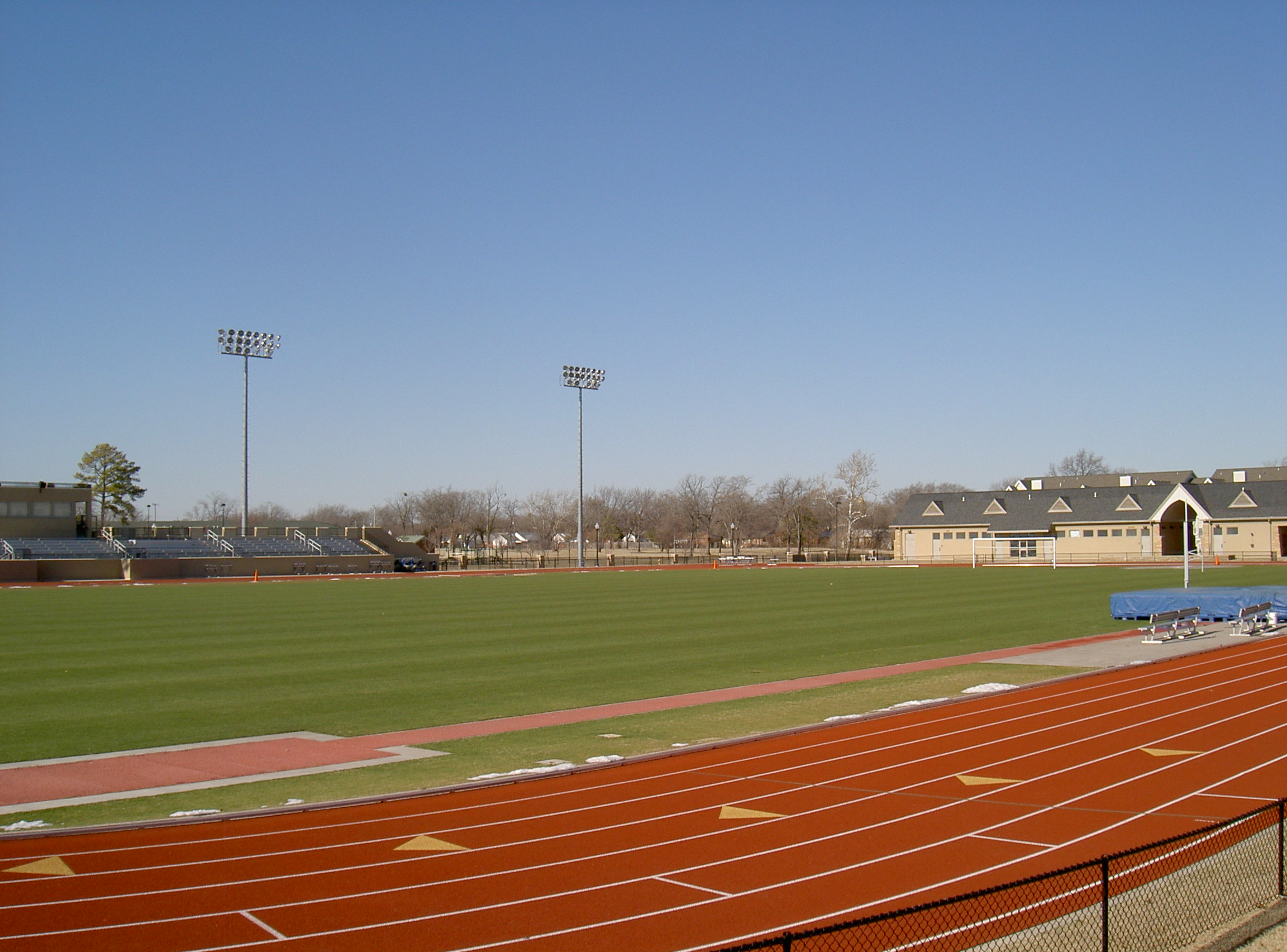
- View of the stadium and track in 2007
- Interactive map of Hurricane Soccer & Track Stadium
- Address: 512 South Delaware Avenue; Tulsa, OK; United States
- Coordinates: 36.152724°N 95.950835°W
- Owner: University of Tulsa
- Operator: University of Tulsa Athletics
- Capacity: 2,000
- Type: Stadium
- Surface: Field: Bermuda grass Track: Polyurethane
- Current use: Soccer; Track and field

Construction
- Opened: August 29, 2003; 23 years ago
- Architects: Hastings & Chivetta Architects, Inc

Tenants
- Tulsa Golden Hurricane (NCAA) (2003–present); Men's & women's soccer Men's & women's outdoor track and field

Website
- tulsahurricane.com/soccer-stadium

Hurricane Soccer & Track Stadium is a multi-purpose stadium on the campus of the University of Tulsa in Tulsa, Oklahoma. The stadium hosts the Tulsa Golden Hurricane men's and women's soccer teams, as well as the track & field team.

The facility opened in August 2003.

The stadium has seating for 2,000, plus standing room if needed.

On Wednesday, May 20, 2015 the Tulsa Roughnecks hosted the Seacoast United Phantoms in the second round of the Lamar Hunt U.S. Open Cup.
