= Jason McLaughlin =

American soccer player (born 1982)

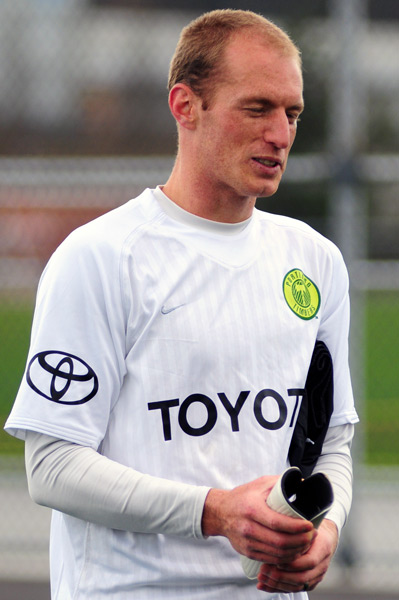

Personal information
- Full name: Jason Ray McLaughlin
- Date of birth: April 14, 1982 (age 44)
- Place of birth: Provo, Utah, United States
- Height: 6 ft 1 in (1.85 m)
- Positions: Midfielder; forward

College career
| Years | Team | Apps | (Gls) |
| 2000–2005 | UAB Blazers | | |

Senior career*
| Years | Team | Apps | (Gls) |
| 2005 | Augusta FireBall | 12 | (7) |
| 2006 | Atlanta Silverbacks | 28 | (5) |
| 2007 | Montreal Impact | 0 | (0) |
| 2007 | Vancouver Whitecaps | 19 | (0) |
| 2008 | Atlanta Silverbacks | 30 | (6) |
| 2009 | Portland Timbers | 21 | (0) |
| 2010 | Portland Timbers U23s | 3 | (0) |

Managerial career
- 2010: Portland Timbers U23s (asst.)
- 2015: Faulkner Eagles (asst.)
- * Club domestic league appearances and goals as of August 7, 2010

Jason McLaughlin (born April 14, 1982, in Provo, Utah) is an American soccer player who last played for Portland Timbers U23s in the USL Premier Development League.

== Career ==
=== College and amateur ===
McLaughlin grew up in Wetumpka, Alabama, and attended the University of Alabama at Birmingham, playing on the men's soccer team from 2000 to 2005, scoring 15 goals and assisted on 13 others during his career. McLaughlin captained the Blazers his junior season and led them to a third-place finish the Conference USA tournament. He led the team in scoring his senior season with five goals and eight assists and received numerous accolades for his performance, including a NSCAA All-South Region third-team selection and All-C-USA second-team honors.

During his college years McLaughlin also played one season with the Augusta Fireball of the USL Premier Development League.

=== Professional ===
McLaughlin signed his first professional contract in 2006 when he joined the Atlanta Silverbacks of the USL First Division. He played 28 games, scoring 5 goals, in his debut season. On January 11, 2007, the Silverbacks traded him and Fabian Dawkins to the Montreal Impact in exchange for Mauricio Salles and Dan Antoniuk.

On April 11, the Impact then traded McLaughlin to the Vancouver Whitecaps for Sita-Taty Matondo, with McLaughlin never having pulled on an Impact jersey. McLaughlin spent the 2007 season in Vancouver, featuring in 19 games.

On November 14, 2007, the Silverbacks announced they had re-signed McLaughlin to a three-year contract after he was released by the Whitecaps. In January 2009, following Atlanta's demise, he moved to the Portland Timbers of the USL-1. He played 21 games for Portland in 2009 before being released on December 7, 2009; he subsequently signed to play for the Timbers' USL Premier Development League affiliate, Portland Timbers U23s, as an over-age player and assistant coach. He made his debut for the U23s on May 21, 2010, in a game against the Spokane Spiders.

== Honors ==
=== Portland Timbers ===
- USL First Division Commissioner's Cup (1): 2009
