= Saint Louis Billikens men's soccer =

American college soccer team

- 2026 Saint Louis Billikens men's soccer team
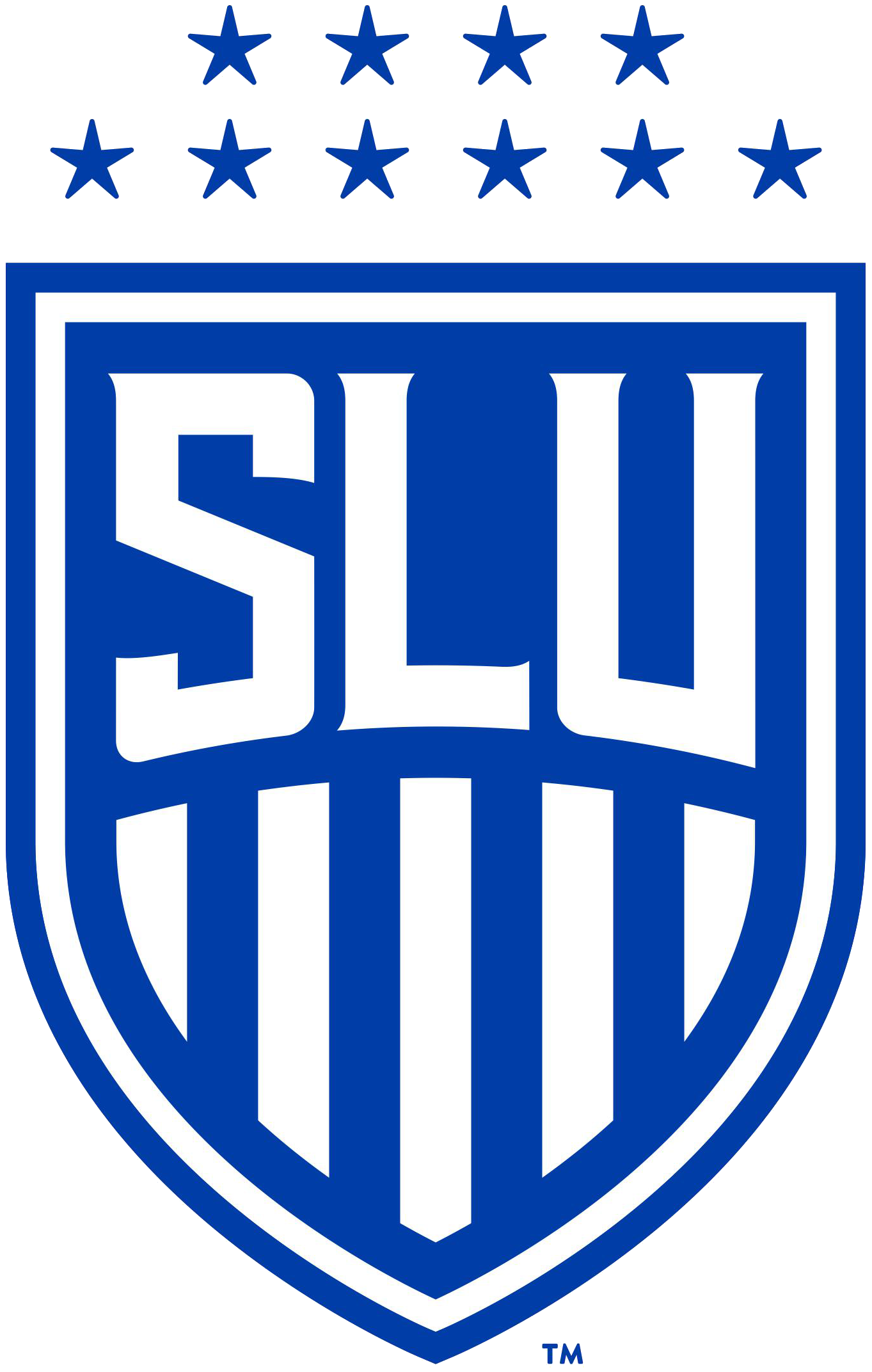
- Founded: 1959; 67 years ago
- University: Saint Louis University
- Head coach: Kevin Kalish (9th season)
- Conference: Atlantic 10
- Location: St. Louis, Missouri, US
- Stadium: Hermann Stadium (capacity: 6,050)
- Nickname: Billikens
- Colors: Blue, White, and Grey
| Home | Away |

NCAA tournament championships
- 1959, 1960, 1962, 1963, 1965, 1967, 1969, 1970, 1972, 1973

NCAA tournament runner-up
- 1961, 1971, 1974

NCAA tournament College Cup
- 1959, 1960, 1961, 1962, 1963, 1964, 1965, 1967, 1969, 1970, 1971, 1972, 1973, 1974, 1991, 1997, 2025

NCAA tournament Quarterfinals
- 1959, 1960, 1961, 1962, 1963, 1964, 1965, 1966, 1967, 1969, 1970, 1971, 1972, 1973, 1974, 1975, 1980, 1983, 1984, 1991, 1997, 2001, 2003, 2021, 2025

NCAA tournament Round of 16
- 1959, 1960, 1961, 1962, 1963, 1964, 1965, 1966, 1967, 1968, 1969, 1970, 1971, 1972, 1973, 1974, 1975, 1976, 1977, 1978, 1980, 1981, 1983, 1984, 1986, 1988, 1990, 1991, 1992, 1993, 1997, 1999, 2001, 2003, 2021, 2025

NCAA tournament appearances
- 1959, 1960, 1961, 1962, 1963, 1964, 1965, 1966, 1967, 1968, 1969, 1970, 1971, 1972, 1973, 1974, 1975, 1976, 1977, 1978, 1979, 1980, 1981, 1983, 1984, 1986, 1987, 1988, 1989, 1990, 1991, 1992, 1993, 1994, 1995, 1997, 1998, 1999, 2000, 2001, 2002, 2003, 2006, 2007, 2008, 2009, 2012, 2014, 2021, 2022, 2024, 2025

Conference tournament championships
- 1991, 1992, 1993, 1995, 1997, 2000, 2001, 2002, 2003, 2009, 2012, 2021, 2022, 2025

Conference regular season championships
- 1991, 1993, 1998, 1999, 2000, 2001, 2002, 2003, 2005, 2006, 2007, 2013, 2016, 2021, 2022, 2025

The Saint Louis Billikens men's soccer team is an intercollegiate varsity sports team of Saint Louis University. The Saint Louis Billikens compete in the Atlantic 10 Conference in the National Collegiate Athletic Association Division I. Soccer is the main fall sport at SLU, which has not sponsored football since 1949.

Despite the long soccer tradition in the city of St. Louis, the University did not field a varsity team until 1959, when the Billikens won the first NCAA soccer championship held. With Bob Guelker as coach, the team achieved a 11–1 record that season. They defeated the University of Bridgeport 5–2 in the championship game.

Noted for their dominance in men's collegiate soccer during the late 1950s through the mid-1970s, the Billikens have won 10 NCAA Men's Soccer Championships, the most of any men's college soccer program in Division 1. Despite this, the Billikens have not appeared in an NCAA national championship final since 1974, and have appeared in the College Cup only three times since then: 1991, 1997, and 2025. Of their ten titles, nine were outright earned by the Billikens and their 1967 title was shared with the Michigan State Spartans.

During their dynasty run from the 1960s through 1970s, the team was coached by Bob Guelker during their first five championships, while Harry Keough coached the last five championship teams at SLU. Dan Donigan was the most recent head coach, serving from February 2001 until he resigned in January 2010 to accept a position at Rutgers. Presently, the Billikens are coached by Kevin Kalish.

== Players ==
=== Current roster ===
As of November 6, 2026

Note: Flags indicate national team as defined under FIFA eligibility rules; some limited exceptions apply. Players may hold more than one non-FIFA nationality.

| No. | Pos. | Nation | Player |
|---|---|---|---|
| 0 | GK | USA | Connor Dillman |
| 1 | GK | DEN | Christian Herluf |
| 2 | DF | USA | Carlos Leatherman |
| 3 | DF | FIN | Gershon Henry |
| 4 | DF | ENG | George Wyatt |
| 5 | DF | USA | JC Cortez |
| 6 | DF | POR | João Pereira |
| 7 | MF | BRA | Alander Soares |
| 8 | MF | ENG | Sam Coughlan |
| 9 | MF | USA | Tanner Anderson |
| 10 | MF | USA | Jack DiMaria |
| 11 | MF | USA | Xavi O'Neil |
| 13 | DF | USA | Kai Jaeger |
| 14 | DF | USA | Luke Adams |
| 15 | DF | USA | Carter Knodle |

| No. | Pos. | Nation | Player |
|---|---|---|---|
| 16 | MF | BRA | Guilherme Gomes |
| 17 | FW | USA | Andrew Heckenlaible |
| 18 | FW | BRA | Theo Franca |
| 19 | MF | USA | Drake Fournier |
| 21 | DF | USA | Jacksen McNeal |
| 22 | FW | USA | Jackson Delkus |
| 23 | MF | USA | Nick Schramm |
| 24 | MF | USA | Kavi Badh |
| 26 | FW | USA | Axel Torres |
| 27 | MF | USA | Sam Kalish |
| 29 | GK | USA | Kyle Deming |
| 30 | GK | USA | Lucas McPartlin |
| 33 | MF | USA | Luke Ponciroli |
| 34 | MF | USA | Henry Sanders |

=== Notable alumni ===
==== 1950s–1980s ====
- Mike Shanahan (1960) — Played on 1959 and 1960 championship teams
- Carl Gentile (1965) — Played with the St. Louis Stars of the North American Soccer League; earned 6 caps with the U.S. national team
- Pat McBride (1967) — Played 10 seasons with the St. Louis Stars of the North American Soccer League; earned 5 caps with the U.S. national team
- Al Trost (1970) — Played with the St. Louis Stars and other teams in the North American Soccer League; earned 14 caps with the U.S. national team
- Pat Leahy (1972) — Played on three of the school's national championship soccer teams; placekicker for the NFL's New York Jets from 1974 to 1992 & Jets' all-time leading scorer
- Chuck Zorumski (1973) -- Played on two of SLU's national championship teams (1972, 1973); MVP 1973; goalkeeper for 1976 U.S. Olympic team; voted into SLU's Half-Century Team
- Joe Clarke (1975) — Played professional soccer for 7 seasons, including stints with NASL's St. Louis Stars and MISL's St. Louis Steamers
- Jim Kavanaugh (1985) — Played in the Major Indoor Soccer League; co-founder and CEO of World Wide Technology.

==== 1990s–present ====
- Mike Sorber (1992) — 67 caps playing for the U.S. national team; played 7 professional seasons from 1994 to 2000 in Mexico and then in MLS
- Brian McBride (1993) — scored 30 goals for the U.S. national team; played several seasons in the English Premier League
- Shane Battelle (1993) — played 3 professional seasons from 1994 to 1996
- Matt McKeon (1995) — played 7 seasons in MLS; 2 caps with the U.S. national team
- Brad Davis (2001) — currently plays for Houston Dynamo; 17 caps with the U.S. national team
- Dipsy Selolwane (2001) — played 4 seasons in MLS; played for the Botswana national team
- Jack Jewsbury (2002) — has played in MLS since 2003; last played for the Portland Timbers in 2016.
- Vedad Ibišević (2003) — played in the German Bundesliga for various clubs from 2006 to 2020; played for Bosnia at the 2014 World Cup
- Will John (2004) — played 3 seasons in MLS before moving to play in Europe
- Tim Ward (2004) — played 8 seasons in MLS
- Martin Hutton (2004) — 2 seasons in MLS from 2005 to 2006
- John DiRaimondo (2006) — played 3 seasons in MLS from 2007 to 2009
- Brandon Barklage (2008) — played 7 seasons in MLS from 2009 to 2015
- Dado Hamzagić (2008) — played professionally two seasons in Bosnia from 2009 to 2011
- Tim Ream (2009) — several professional seasons in MLS and in England; 50 U.S. national team caps, including every minute of the team's four games in the 2022 FIFA World Cup
- Chad Vandegriffe (2012) — played professionally in USL, MISL, and MASL
- Jorge Lujano (2015) — played professionally in USL
- Chase Niece (2022) who last played for North Texas SC. Who currently a free agent.
- Kipp Keller (2022) played for Minnesota United in MLS.
- Isaiah Parker (2022) who last played for FC Dallas. Who currently a free agent.
- John Klein III (2023) – played for Charleston Battery in USL Championship..
- Max Floriani (2024) – played for San Jose Earthquakes in MLS.

Note: The number in parentheses indicates the year the player graduated from SLU; for those who didn't graduate from SLU, the number indicates the last year they played for SLU.

== Coaches ==
=== Current staff ===
As of June 12, 2025

| Position | Staff |
|---|---|
| Head Coach | Kevin Kalish |
| Assistant Coach | Kevin Stoll |
| Assistant Coach | Jack Roberts |
| Director of Operations | Constantin Heider |
| Assistant Coach (GKs) | Carlos Tofern |

Last updated: June 12, 2025
Source: Here

=== Head coaching history ===
| Dates | Name | Notes |
|---|---|---|
| 1959–1966 | (United States) Bob Guelker | Won 5 NCAA championships in 8 seasons. |
| 1967–1982 | (United States) Harry Keough | Won 5 NCAA championships in his first 7 seasons. |
| 1983–1996 | (United States) Joe Clarke | |
| 1997–2000 | (United States) Bob Warming | |
| 2001–2009 | (United States) Dan Donigan | |
| 2010–2017 | (United States) Mike McGinty | |
| 2018–present | (United States) Kevin Kalish | |

== Titles ==
=== National ===
| Championship | Titles | Winning years |
|---|---|---|
| NCAA tournament | 10 | 1959, 1960, 1962, 1963, 1965, 1967, 1969, 1970, 1972, 1973 |

=== Conference ===
| Conference | Championship | Titles | Winning years |
|---|---|---|---|
| Conference USA | Tournament | 6 | 1995, 1997, 2000, 2001, 2002, 2003 |
| Conference USA | Regular season | 15 | 1991, 1993, 1998, 1999, 2000, 2001, 2002, 2003, 2005, 2006, 2007, 2013, 2016, 2021, 2022 |
| Atlantic 10 | Tournament | 4 | 2009, 2012, 2021, 2022, 2025 |
| Atlantic 10 | Regular season | 1 | 2025 |

== Seasons ==
=== NCAA dominance: 1959–1974 ===
The following table shows the sixteen-year span from 1959 to 1974 in which SLU won 10 NCAA titles. In the six seasons in which SLU did not win, they finished second three times, reached the semifinals once, reached the quarterfinals once, and reached the round-of-16 once. In all 16 seasons, the NCAA tournament was either won by SLU or by the team that had beaten SLU.

St. Louis winning NCAA tournament seasons
| Title No. | Title season | Regular season | NCAA tourn. | Total record |
|---|---|---|---|---|
| 1 | 1959 | 8–1-0 | 3–0 | 12–1–0 |
| 2 | 1960 | 11–1-0 | 3–0 | 14–1–0 |
| 3 | 1962 | 9–0-1 | 3–0 | 12–0–1 |
| 4 | 1963 | 10–0-0 | 3–0 | 13–0–0 |
| 5 | 1965 | 10–0-0 | 4–0 | 14–0–0 |
| 6 | 1967 | 5–3-1 | 3–1 | 13–3–2 |
| 7 | 1969 | 9–0–0 | 4–0 | 13–0–0 |
| 8 | 1970 | 10–0-1 | 4–0 | 14–0–1 |
| 9 | 1972 | 11–2–3 | 4–0 | 15–2–3 |
| 10 | 1973 | 11–2–3 | 4–0 | 15–2–3 |

=== Modern seasons ===
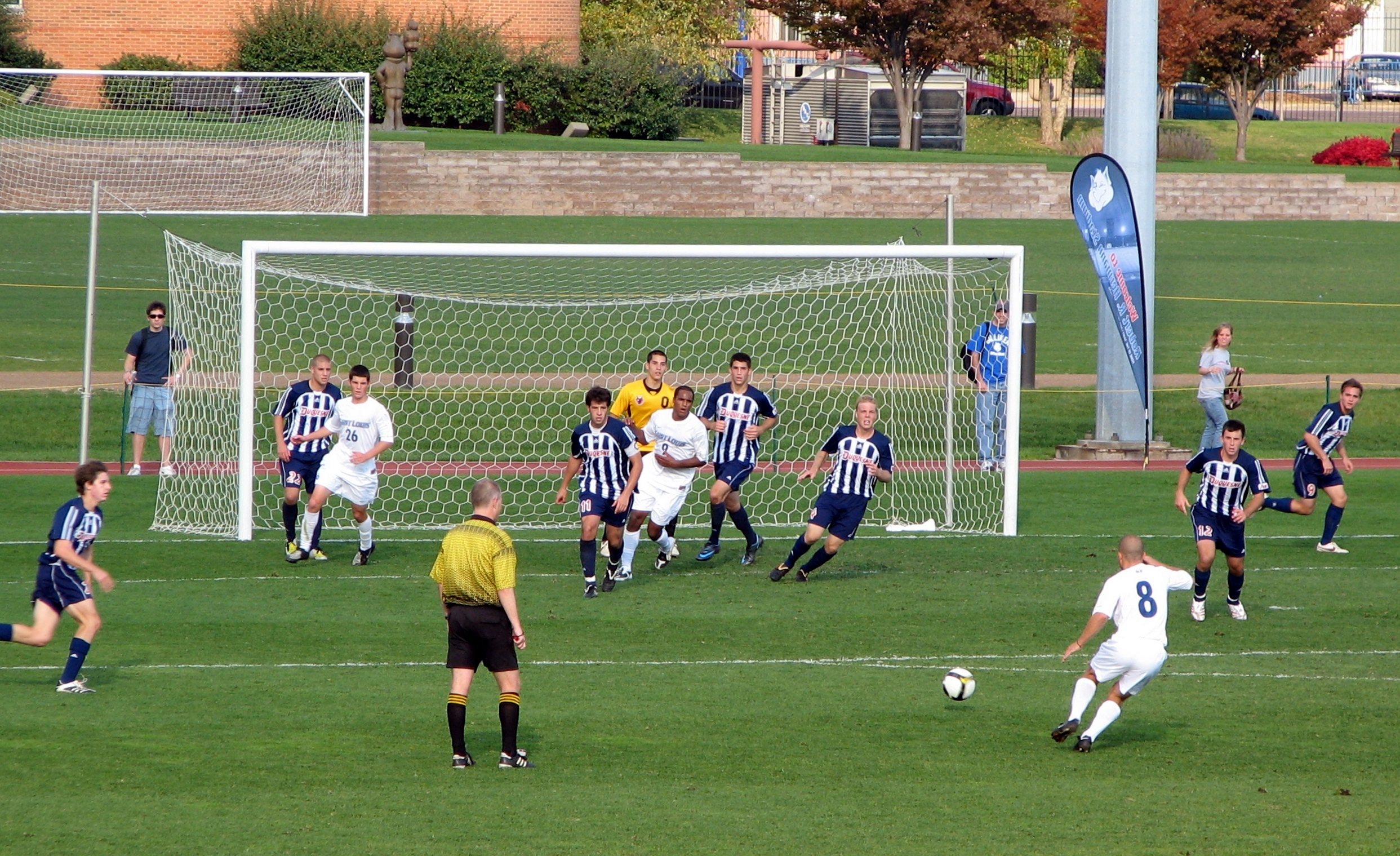
St. Louis threaten to score against Duquesne, November 2008

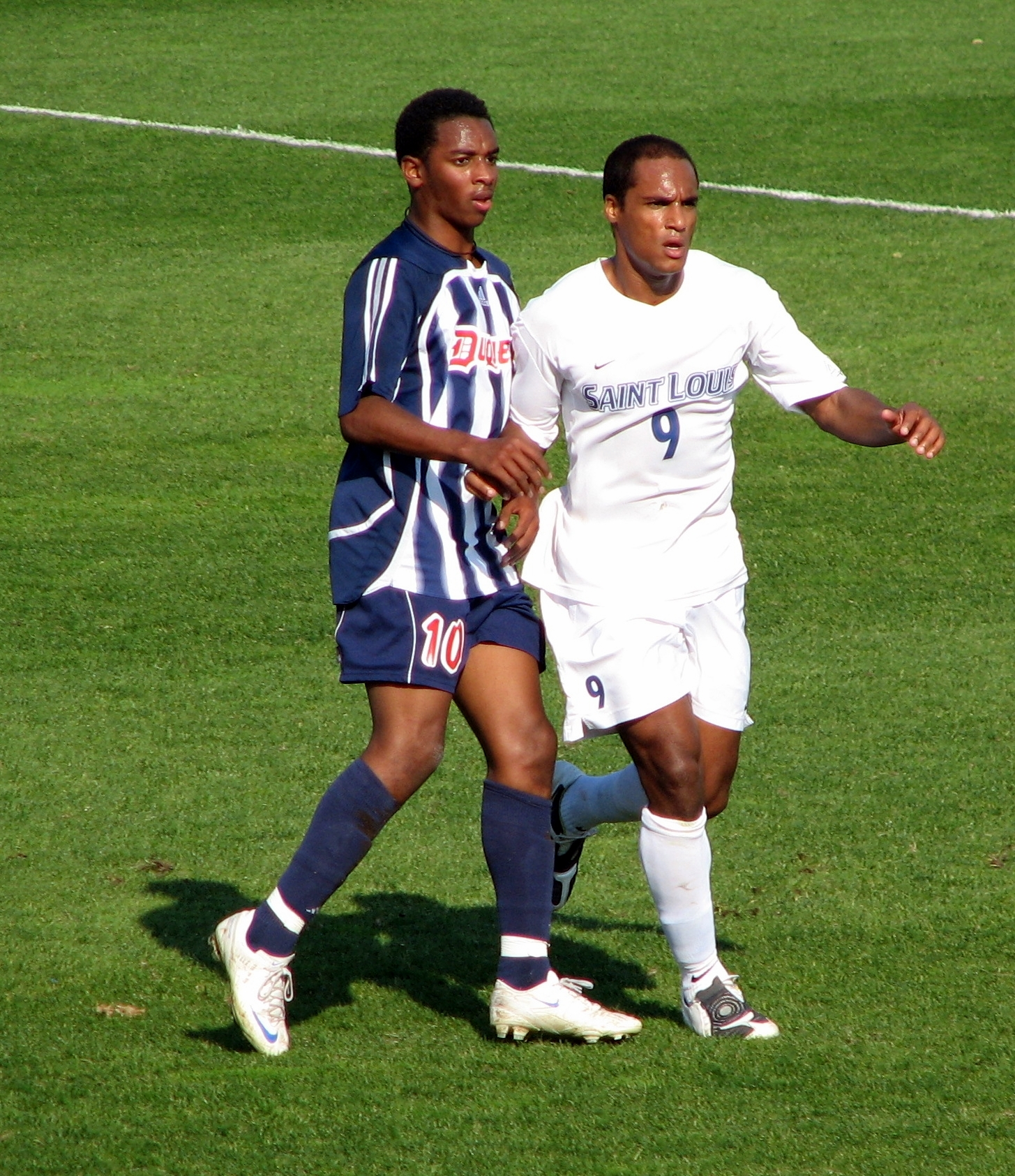
St. Louis (in white) vs. Duquesne, November 2008

Previous Season's Records and Standings
| Season | Overall record | Conf. Record | Coach | Conf. | Conf. Rank | Conf. Tournament | NCAA tournament |
|---|---|---|---|---|---|---|---|
| 2025 | 13–3–8 | 5–0–3 | Kevin Kalish | A10 | 1st | Champions | Semifinals |
| 2024 | 8–5–8 | 4–1–3 | Kevin Kalish | A10 | T-5th | Runners-Up | 1st. round |
| 2023 | 8–4–5 | 4–1–3 | Kevin Kalish | A10 | 2nd | Quarterfinals | |
| 2022 | 12–5–3 | 6–1–1 | Kevin Kalish | A10 | 1st | Champions | 2nd. round |
| 2021 | 16–1–4 | 8–0–0 | Kevin Kalish | A10 | 1st | Champions | Quarterfinals |
| 2020 | 9–5–0 | 4–2–0 | Kevin Kalish | A10 | 2nd | Semifinals | |
| 2019 | 10–7–0 | 6–2–0 | Kevin Kalish | A10 | 4th | Quarterfinals | |
| 2018 | 6–4–7 | 4–4–0 | Kevin Kalish | A10 | 6th | Quarterfinals | |
| 2017 | 7–9–1 | 4–4–0 | Mike McGinty | A10 | 8th | Quarterfinals | |
| 2016 | 7–8–3 | 6–2–0 | Mike McGinty | A10 | 1st | Quarterfinals | |
| 2015 | 8–7–2 | 4–2–2 | Mike McGinty | A10 | 3rd | Quarterfinals | |
| 2014 | 14–4–2 | 5–1–2 | Mike McGinty | A10 | 2nd | Semifinals | 2nd round |
| 2013 | 14–5–2 | 6–0–2 | Mike McGinty | A10 | 1st | Runner-Up | |
| 2012 | 16–5–0 | 7–2–0 | Mike McGinty | A10 | 1st | Champions | 2nd. round |
| 2011 | 6–10–1 | 4–5–0 | Mike McGinty | A10 | 10th | | |
| 2010 | 9–7–3 | 5–3–0 | Mike McGinty | A10 | 5th | Semifinals | |
| 2009 | 12–6–0 | 7–2–0 | Donigan | A10 | 2nd | Champions | 2nd Round |
| 2008 | 12–5–5 | 6–3 | Donigan | A10 | 4th | Semifinals | 2nd round |

== See also ==
- Keough Award — given to the top male and female soccer players from the St. Louis, Missouri area.
- St. Louis Soccer Hall of Fame
- Soccer in St. Louis
- Saint Louis–SIU Edwardsville men's soccer rivalry
