= Tulsa Golden Hurricane men's soccer =

American college soccer team

- Founded: 1980; 46 years ago
- University: University of Tulsa
- Head coach: Tom McIntosh (32nd season)
- Conference: The American
- Location: Tulsa, Oklahoma, US
- Stadium: Hurricane Soccer & Track Stadium (capacity: 2,000)
- Nickname: Golden Hurricane
- Colors: Blue, Old gold, and Crimson
Home	Away

NCAA tournament Quarterfinals
- 2004, 2009

NCAA tournament Round of 16
- 2004, 2009, 2012, 2021, 2022

NCAA tournament appearances
- 1991, 2003, 2004, 2007, 2008, 2009, 2010, 2012, 2014, 2015, 2016, 2021, 2022, 2026

Conference tournament championships
- 1991, 2007, 2008, 2009, 2012, 2014, 2015, 2016, 2021, 2026

Conference regular season championships
- 1991, 2007, 2008, 2009, 2021, 2026

The Tulsa Golden Hurricane men's soccer team is an intercollegiate varsity sports team of the University of Tulsa. The team is a member of the American Conference (The American) in the National Collegiate Athletic Association. In the last two decades, Tulsa has been regularly ranked in the Top 25 NSCAA Collegiate men's soccer poll.

== History ==
The Tulsa men's soccer team started as a varsity sport in 1980. That year, they finished the season with seven wins, six losses and one tie. The first win came against John Brown University. Tulsa's third head coach, Randy Waldrum, led the school to their first NCAA tournament in 1991, and was the coach during Tulsa's record setting consecutive home wins and consecutive home games without a loss streaks, the longest in NCAA history, set during the same stretch of 39 games from 1988 to 1992.

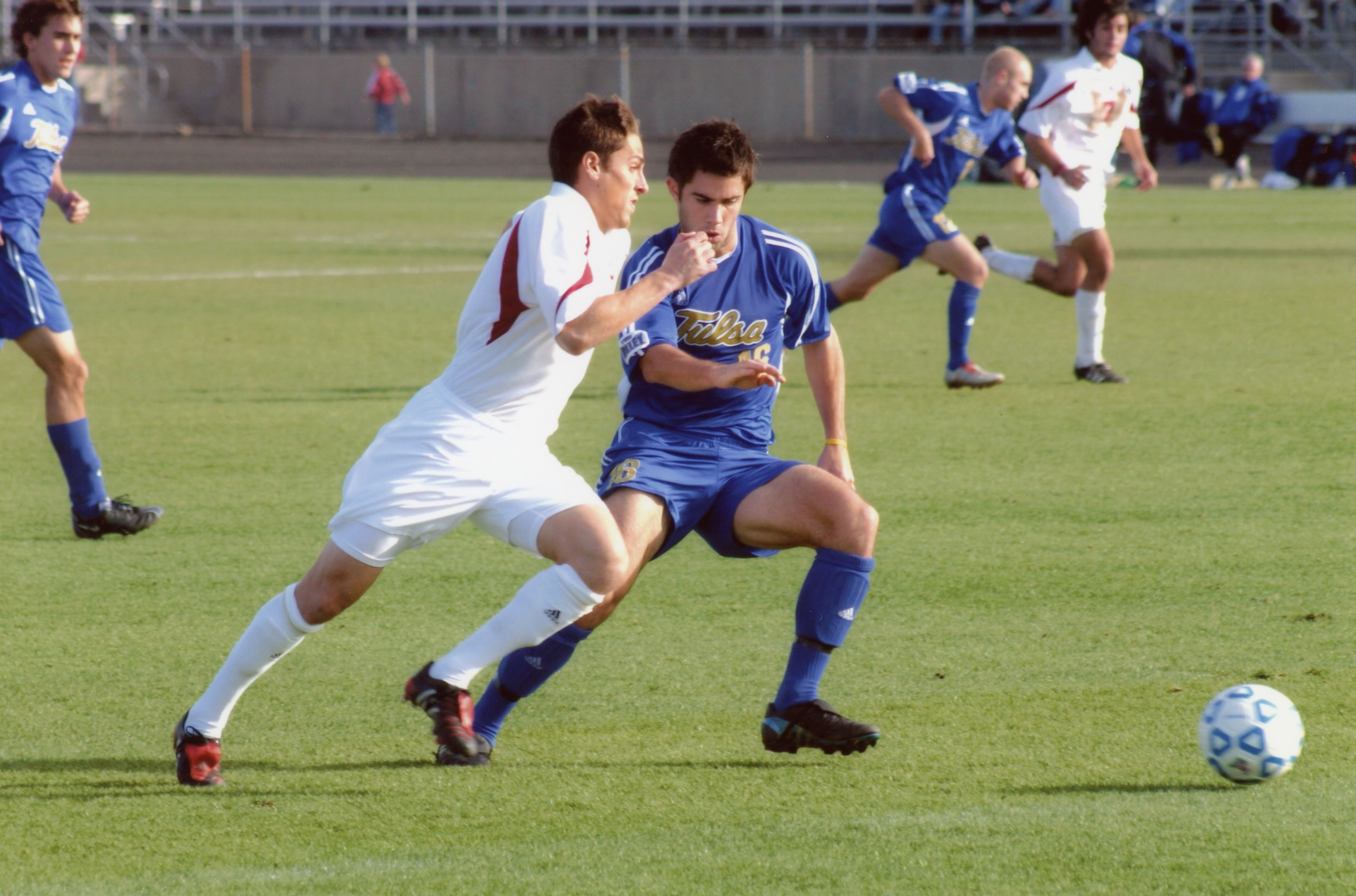
Tulsa faces eventual champion Indiana in the regional finals of the 2004 NCAA Men's Soccer Championship

TU has won four conference championships and eight conference tournaments. The Golden Hurricane has twice reached the elite-eight of the NCAA Men's Soccer Championship, falling to eventual champion Indiana in 2004 and top seeded Akron in 2009. Tulsa has participated in eleven NCAA tournaments during its history (1991, 2003, 2004, 2007, 2008, 2009, 2010, 2012, 2014, 2015, 2016). The school has produced Soccer's first All-American Frank Velez in 1991. It has also produced its first team All-American, Ryan Pore, who played for the Portland Timbers, and previously played for Kansas City Wizards of Major League Soccer. Terry Boss of Seattle Sounders FC and Lawson Vaughn of D.C. United are former Golden Hurricane who played in MLS. Dominic Cervi played for Celtic F.C. of Glasgow, Scotland, and fellow goalkeeper Tyrel Lacey signed with FC Lyn Oslo of Oslo, Norway. Since 1995, the head coach has been Tom McIntosh, a prominent figure in Tulsa soccer for over 20 years.

== Current squad ==
As of November 2026

Note: Flags indicate national team as defined under FIFA eligibility rules; some limited exceptions apply. Players may hold more than one non-FIFA nationality.

No.	Pos.	Nation	Player
0	GK	USA	Carlito Saylon
00	GK	USA	Harrison Klamser
1	GK	USA	Sebastian Gorecki
2	FW	USA	Christian Mezas
3	DF	USA	Druv Pareek
4	DF	USA	Cale Saunders
5	MF	ENG	Luc Achermann-Stanfield
6	MF	USA	Jared Aguilar
7	FW	ESP	Arnau Pedrola Fortuny
8	MF	CAN	Quentin Christey
9	FW	RSA	Kgodiso Sukati
10	FW	USA	Peleg Armendariz
12	MF	USA	Heztli Rodriguez
13	DF	ESP	Dani Gamboa

No.	Pos.	Nation	Player
14	MF	USA	Jareth Mejia
15	DF	ESP	Bruno Medina
16	DF	USA	Chaz Williams
17	FW	USA	Aiden Hale
18	FW	CAN	Joses Chukwu
19	DF	USA	Omar Flores
20	MF	USA	Luke Cassar
21	FW	USA	Aimar Membrila
22	DF	GER	Danny Stevens
23	DF	AUS	Lucas Cook
24	DF	USA	Jake Reich
25	FW	USA	Will Applegate
26	DF	USA	Patrick Stoklas
27	MF	USA	Ian McIntosh

== Colors and badge ==
The team uses the school colors of Old Gold, Royal Blue, and Crimson .

== Stadium ==
The team plays in the Hurricane Soccer & Track Stadium, site of the 2009 C-USA conference tournament.

== Notable players ==
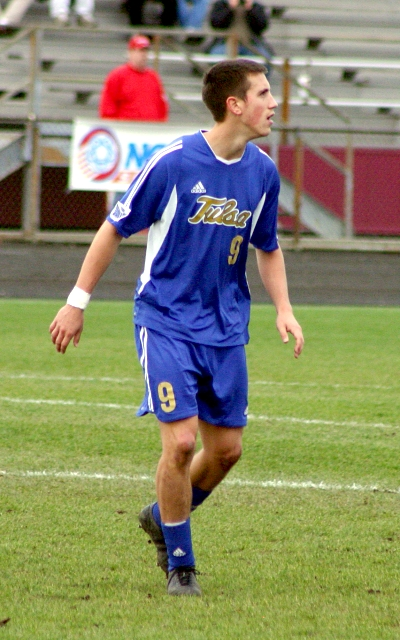
Ryan Pore

Ryan Pore, First-Team All-American, finalist for the 2004 Hermann Trophy. Played for the Portland Timbers, Montreal Impact, and Kansas City Wizards.

Frank Velez, 1991 Second-Team All-American, University of Tulsa Athlete of the Year 1991. Played for the Dallas Rockets

== Head coaches ==
Listed according to when they became head coach for Tulsa (year in parentheses):

- 1970s–1980s: Walter Schnoor (1980), Bruce Palmbaum (1986), Randy Waldrum (1989)
- 1990s–2000s: Tom McIntosh (1995)

== Achievements ==
- Missouri Valley Conference Regular Season:
  - Winners (1): 1991
- Missouri Valley Conference Tournament:
  - Winners (1): 1991
- Conference USA Regular Season:
  - Winners (3): 2007, 2008, 2009
- Conference USA Tournament:
  - Winners (4): 2007, 2008, 2009, 2012
- American Conference (NCAA) Regular Season:
  - winners (1): 2021
- American Conference (NCAA) Tournament:
  - Winners (4): 2014, 2015, 2016, 2021

== Records ==
- Most Goals in a game: 16 (16–0) vs. Nicholls State University, September 9, 1990
- Most consecutive wins: 12, 1989
- Most home wins: 39, 1988–1992
- Most Goals by a Freshman Frank Velez (17)
- Most Career Goals Frank Velez (62)
- Most Career Points Frank Velez (136)

== See also ==
- University of Tulsa
- Tulsa Golden Hurricane
- College soccer
