= Marquette Golden Eagles =

Sports clubs representing Marquette University

- University: Marquette University
- Nickname: Golden Eagles
- NCAA: Division I
- Conference: Big East
- Athletic director: Mike Broeker
- Location: Milwaukee, Wisconsin
- Varsity teams: 16
- Basketball arena: Fiserv Forum (men); Al McGuire Center (women)
- Soccer stadium: Valley Fields
- Other venues: Hart Park Stadium
- Colors: Blue and gold
- Mascot: Iggy the Golden Eagle
- Fight song: "Ring Out Ahoya"
- Website: gomarquette.com
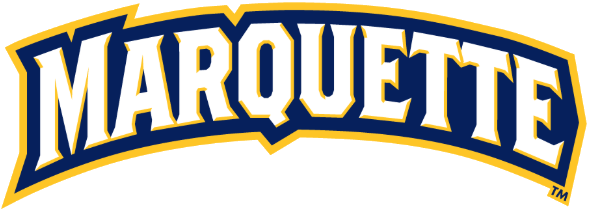

The Marquette Golden Eagles are an athletic team representing Marquette University in Milwaukee, Wisconsin, United States. They compete as a member of the NCAA Division I level (non-football, sub-level), primarily competing in the Big East Conference for all sports since its establishment in 2013. The Golden Eagles are a founding member of the current Big East, having been one of the seven members of the original Big East that broke away to form a basketball-focused league. They had joined the original Big East in 2005, having previously competed in Conference USA (C-USA) from 1995 to 2005, the Great Midwest Conference from 1991 to 1995, and the Horizon League from 1988 to 1991. They also competed as an independent from 1916 to 1988. Men's sports include basketball, cross country, golf, lacrosse, soccer, tennis, and track & field, while women's sports include basketball, cross country, lacrosse, soccer, tennis, track & field, and volleyball.

The men's basketball team won the NCAA national championship in 1977, was a finalist in 1974, and was a semi-finalist in 2003. The 1970 team won the National Invitation Tournament. Marquette won the Conference USA Tournament in 1997 and the Big East Tournament in 2023. The men's basketball team won 4 regular-season conference championships in 1994, 2003, 2013, and 2023.

Previously known as the "Warriors," Marquette changed their nickname to "Golden Eagles" in May 1994 to address the school's Native American name controversy, despite another Jesuit school—Boston College—already being called the "Eagles." In May 2005, the university changed the nickname to "Gold" (in the same manner as Syracuse's "Orange"), but the decision was reversed after public backlash.

On December 15, 2012, Marquette and the other six Catholic, non-FBS Big East schools (the Catholic 7) announced that they were departing the Big East for a new conference. In March 2013, it was confirmed that the Catholic 7, along with three other schools, would begin operations in July as a new Big East Conference.

== Varsity sports ==
Men's sports	Women's sports
Basketball	Basketball
Cross country	Cross country
Lacrosse	Lacrosse
Soccer	Soccer
Tennis	Tennis
Track & field^{†}	Track & field^{†}
Golf	Volleyball
	Swimming
† – Track and field includes both indoor and outdoor.

=== Men's basketball ===
The men's basketball team is ninth in the NCAA for postseason appearances all-time (45), including 30 NCAA Tournament appearances (T-11th all time). The Warriors, coached by Al McGuire, won the 1977 NCAA tournament and were runners-up in 1974. Maurice "Bo" Ellis was a member of each of those teams and remains the only Marquette player to appear in two Final Fours.

The 2003 team, coached by Tom Crean and led on the court by Dwyane Wade, Robert Jackson, Steve Novak, and Travis Diener, upset top-ranked Kentucky to reach the Final Four of the 2003 NCAA tournament. In that Midwest regional final in Minneapolis, Wade became the fourth player to record a triple-double in an NCAA tournament game. He was named an AP All-American two years in a row and was the Conference USA Player of the Year.

The team plays in the Fiserv Forum, the same venue used by the Milwaukee Bucks, and has been doing so since the 2018-2019 season. When Fiserv Forum opened, it replaced the Bradley Center, which was home to both the Golden Eagles and the Bucks from 1988 to 2008.

==== Conference affiliations ====
Conference	Years
Independent	1916–17 to 1988–89
Midwestern Collegiate	1989–90 to 1990–91
Great Midwest	1991–92 to 1994–95
Conference USA	1995–96 to 2004–05
Big East	2005–06 to present

The charter of the current Big East dates only to 2013. However, the settlement between the schools that formed the current Big East and those that remained in the league now known as the American Athletic Conference gave the departing schools the "Big East" name. Additionally, The American recognizes none of the pre-2013 athletic history of the Big East—even in football and women's rowing, the only two sports sponsored by the original Big East that are sponsored by The American but not the current Big East.

=== Women's basketball ===
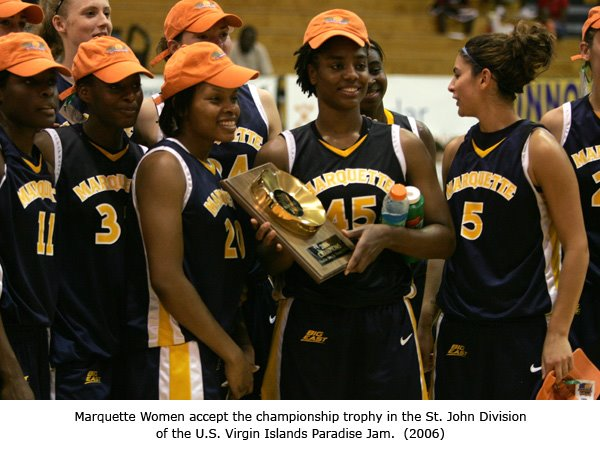
Marquette team photo 2006, Paradise Jam Tournament winner

The women's basketball team is coached by Carolyn Kieger. The program has experienced success in recent years under former coach Terri Mitchell's direction, including a run to the championship game of the WNIT, where the women finished as runners-up in 2006, and won the championship in 2008. Most recently, the team made it to the second round of the NCAA tournament in 2011, where they were defeated by top-seeded Tennessee. Marquette women's basketball has qualified for the NCAA tournament seven times since 1994. The team now plays in the Al McGuire Center, named after the former Marquette men's coach.

The team notably hired Tyler Summitt, the 21-year-old son of the former Tennessee coach Pat Summitt, as an assistant effective with the 2012–13 season, the announcement coming on the same day his mother announced her retirement after 38 years leading the Lady Vols.

In 2006, Marquette traveled to St. Thomas to participate in the Paradise Jam tournament. In the opening round Marquette defeated Western Michigan 74–61. In the second round Marquette defeated Auburn 65–61. On the final day, Marquette beat Xavier 73–53 to finish with a 3–0 record and win the 2006 Paradise Jam Championship (St. John division).

=== Cross-country and track ===
The cross-country and track teams have produced five Olympians, 13 NCAA champions and 27 All-Americans. Except for Dwyane Wade, Marquette's most successful student-athlete was track and field sprinter Ralph Metcalfe, a world-record holder and Olympic gold medalist. Olympic silver medalist Melvin "Bus" Shimek (1904–1987) was the longtime coach of both programs; he was a top distance runner at MU in the 1920s and coached until 1976, the last 29 years as head coach, a total of 52 years as athlete and coach at Marquette. Shimek set the school record in the mile in 1927 and it held up for over thirty years.

Both programs were dropped with football in December 1960, but cross country was reinstated within weeks so the athletic program could retain its NCAA membership, which required a varsity intercollegiate sport in each season. Track missed three spring seasons (1961–1963) and returned in March 1964, initially without scholarships.

=== Football (varsity) ===
The varsity football team was known as the "Golden Avalanche" prior to the program being terminated in 1960. Marquette football posted several successful seasons in the 1920s and 1930s including undefeated seasons in 1922, 1923, and 1930. From 1922 to 1923 Marquette held a 17–0–1 record and outscored its opponents 374–15. The 1930 Marquette squad posted seven shutouts and held a 155–7 scoring margin. From 1920 to 1936 Marquette held a 90–32–6 (.727) record. 1936 Golden Avalanche had a 7–1 regular season record with a top 20 ranking and played in the inaugural Cotton Bowl Classic against Texas Christian University, led by quarterback Sammy Baugh; TCU won 16–6.

After accumulating several years of budget deficits for the university, the football program was dropped after a 3–6 season in 1960 under second-year coach Lisle Blackbourn, along with track and cross country programs. Their last successful season was 1953 and the last seven seasons had a combined 10–44–3 (.202) record, including two straight winless seasons (1956 and 1957), under new head coach Johnny Druze. At the time, Marquette had a 78-year football tradition and was the largest Catholic university in the United States. Cross country was immediately reinstated and track returned in 1964; football at Marquette returned at the club level in 1967.

Marquette Stadium, the football team's home since 1924, was dismantled in 1978. Located in the Merrill Park neighborhood west of the university, the stadium had a seating capacity of 24,000 at its peak. It was used by Green Bay Packers of the NFL for three home games in 1952; the Packers played several home games in Milwaukee every season from 1933 through 1994; previous games were played State Fair Park in West Allis and succeeding years at the new County Stadium. Marquette played a majority of its home schedule at County Stadium in 1957 and 1958.

=== Men's golf ===
Marquette University fields only a men's team for golf. Former head coach Tim Grogan was honored as the Big East Conference Men's Golf Coach of the Year in 2006 and 2008. The golf team holds Marquette's only Big East Championships, which were won in 2008, 2015, 2017, 2019, 2023, and 2025. Mike Van Sickle, class of 2009, was named to the Ping Division I All-American Honorable Mention list in 2007 and 2008. He was a first-team All-American in 2009. Van Sickle currently holds the school record for single-season average at 70.00 strokes per 18 holes, and most sub-par rounds at 86.

=== Lacrosse ===
On December 16, 2010, the university announced that it would be adding men's and women's lacrosse teams to begin play as independents in the 2012–13 academic year, before becoming full members of the Big East Conference in men's and women's lacrosse in 2013–14. The team's home field is Valley Fields.

=== Soccer ===
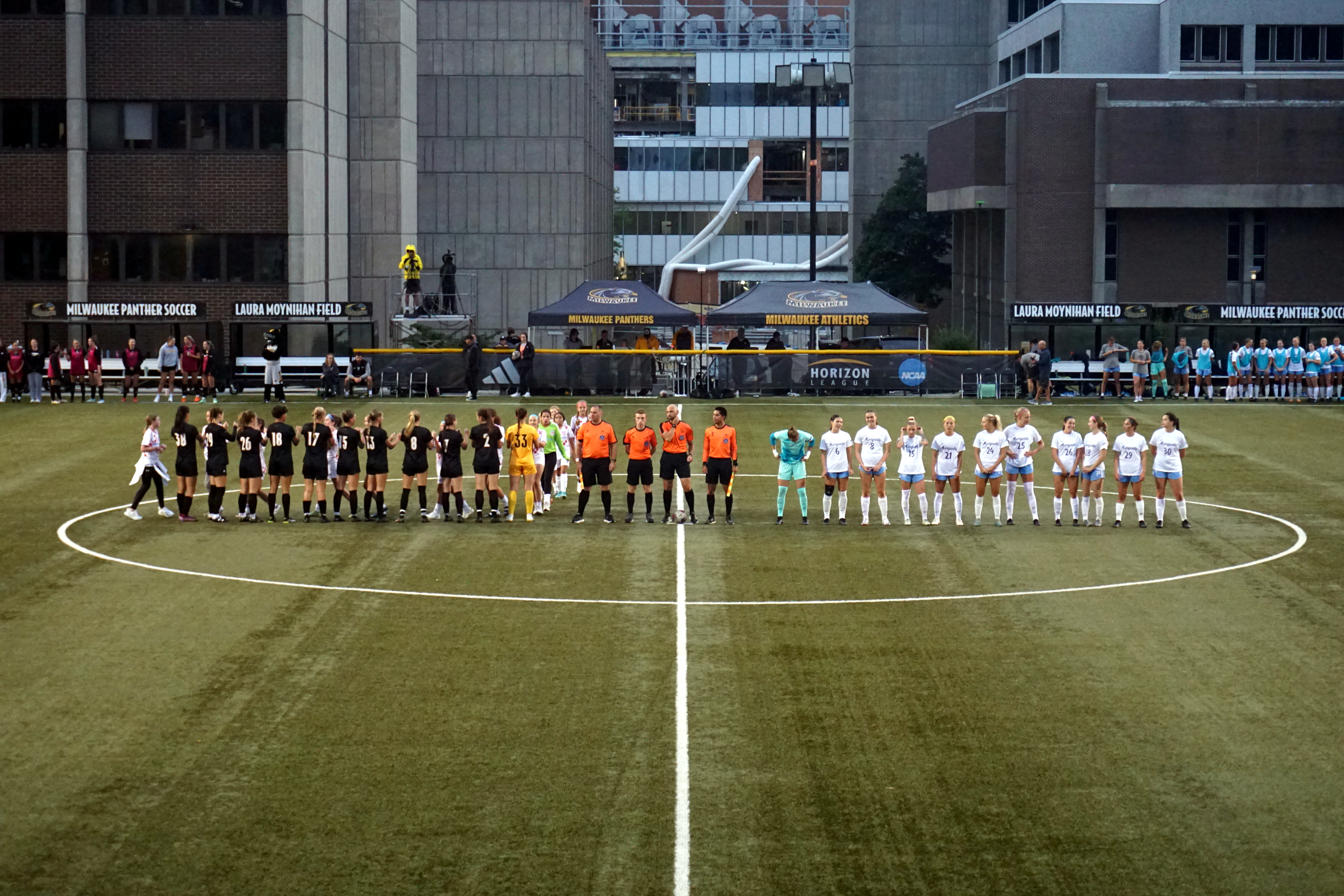
Marquette women's soccer team before game against Milwaukee

The men's and women's soccer programs have achieved varying degrees of success. In 2006, the men's team won only one game and finished last in their conference while the women made a run into the NCAA postseason tournament.

In 2022, Marquette University sold 11 acres of land to Bear Development, which plans to co-develop a sports complex with Kacmarcik Enterprises named Iron District MKE. This complex will serve as the competition venue for men's and women's soccer as well as men's and women's lacrosse. It will have a seating capacity of 8,000 and also serve as the home field for a future USL Championship team.

Both teams currently compete at Valley Fields.

== Championships ==
=== NCAA team championships ===
Marquette has one NCAA team national championship.

- Men's (1)
  - Basketball (1): 1977
- See also:
  - Big East Conference NCAA team championships
  - List of NCAA schools with the most NCAA Division I championships

== Notable athletes ==
=== Basketball ===
- Gene Berce – Tri-Cities Blackhawks
- Jim Boylan – NBA assistant coach for the Milwaukee Bucks, former Chicago Bulls interim head coach
- Jimmy Butler – forward/guard, Golden State Warriors
- Bill Chandler – NBA coach
- Jim Chones – NBA forward/center
- Chris Crawford – Atlanta Hawks
- Jae Crowder – 2012 Big East Player of the Year, men's basketball, Milwaukee Bucks
- Travis Diener – Orlando Magic, Indiana Pacers, Portland Trail Blazers, Dinamo Sassari
- Bo Ellis – Denver Nuggets
- Lazar Hayward – forward, Minnesota Timberwolves, Oklahoma City Thunder
- Christopher Johlie – cheered in 3 Big East Championships for Marquette; inducted into the Cheerleading Hall of Fame in 2011
- Darius Johnson-Odom – Los Angeles Lakers
- Don Kojis – former NBA All-Star forward for the Baltimore Bullets, Detroit Pistons, Chicago Bulls, San Diego Rockets, Seattle SuperSonics, Kansas City-Omaha Kings, and forward for the gold medal-winning United States men's national basketball team in the 1963 FIBA World Championship, where he was named to the All-Tournament Team
- Butch Lee – Atlanta Hawks
- Maurice Lucas – Portland Trail Blazers, New Jersey Nets, New York Knicks, Phoenix Suns, Los Angeles Lakers, Seattle SuperSonics
- Wesley Matthews – guard, Utah Jazz, Portland Trail Blazers, Dallas Mavericks, New York Knicks, Indiana Pacers, Milwaukee Bucks, Los Angeles Lakers, Atlanta Hawks
- Jim McIlvaine – Washington Bullets, Seattle SuperSonics, New Jersey Nets
- Jerel McNeal – guard, Rio Grande Valley Vipers of the NBA D-League, New Orleans Hornets, Toronto Raptors, Utah Jazz
- Dean Meminger – New York Knicks
- Ed Mullen – National Basketball League
- Steve Novak – forward, Houston Rockets, Los Angeles Clippers, Dallas Mavericks, San Antonio Spurs, New York Knicks, Milwaukee Bucks
- Doc Rivers – current head coach of the Milwaukee Bucks; former head coach of the Philadelphia 76ers, Orlando Magic, Boston Celtics, and Los Angeles Clippers; former point guard for the Atlanta Hawks, Los Angeles Clippers, New York Knicks, and San Antonio Spurs
- Tony Smith – Los Angeles Lakers, Charlotte Hornets
- Earl Tatum – Los Angeles Lakers
- George Thompson – Milwaukee Bucks
- Dwyane Wade – guard, Miami Heat, Chicago Bulls, Cleveland Cavaliers, three-time NBA champion, twelve-time NBA All-Star, 2006 NBA Finals MVP, 2009 NBA scoring champion, 2008 Olympic gold medalist
- Jerome Whitehead – played for six NBA teams in an 11-year career

=== Football ===
- George Andrie – defensive end, Dallas Cowboys
- Ray Buivid – tailback, Chicago Bears
- Ward Cuff – defensive back, place kicker, and fullback/halfback, New York Giants
- LaVern Dilweg – end, Green Bay Packers; U.S. Congressman
- Ron Drzewiecki – halfback, Chicago Bears
- Red Dunn – running back, Green Bay Packers
- Frank Murray – former Marquette football coach, inducted into the College Football Hall of Fame in 1983
- Gene Ronzani – head coach, Green Bay Packers; back, Chicago Bears
- John Sisk, Jr. – Chicago Bears
- Milt Trost – Chicago Bears

=== Soccer ===
- Jeremiah Bass – Minnesota Thunder
- Bryan Ciesiulka – Saint Louis FC
- Hayden Knight – Dallas Sidekicks
- Charlie Lyon – Seattle Sounders FC
- Calum Mallace – CF Montréal
- Maegan Rosa — Canada, Florentia, Houston Dash
- Axel Sjöberg – Colorado Rapids

=== Track and field ===
- Ralph Metcalfe – Olympic gold medalist in the 4 × 100 m Relay in 1936; Olympic silver medalist in the 100m dash in 1932 and 1936

== See also ==
- List of college athletic programs in Wisconsin
