= Memphis Tigers =

Sports teams of the University of Memphis

- University: University of Memphis
- Nickname: Tigers
- NCAA: Division I (FBS)
- Conference: American (primary); Great America Rifle Conference
- Athletic director: Dr. Ed Scott
- Location: Memphis, Tennessee
- Varsity teams: 19 (9 men's, 9 women's, 1 coed)
- Football stadium: Simmons Bank Liberty Stadium
- Basketball arena: FedExForum
- Baseball stadium: FedExPark
- Soccer stadium: Mike Rose Soccer Complex
- Other venues: Elma Roane Fieldhouse
- Colors: Blue and gray
- Mascot: Pouncer
- Fight song: Go, Tigers! Go!
- Website: gotigersgo.com

The Memphis Tigers are the athletic teams that represent the University of Memphis, located in Memphis, Tennessee. The teams compete at the National Collegiate Athletic Association (NCAA) Division I level as a member of the American Conference, except for the rifle team, which is a member of the single-sport Great America Rifle Conference.

== Name ==
When the Memphis State University first fielded a football team in the fall of 1912, no one had selected a nickname for the squad. Early references to the football team tabbed them only as the Blue and Gray Warriors.

After the final game of the 1914 season, there was a student parade. During this event, several university students shouted, "We fight like Tigers!" The nickname was born. As time passed, the nickname "Tigers" was increasingly used, particularly in campus publications, but did not catch on with the newspapers downtown. They continued to use "the Blue and Gray" when referring to the university.

Under Coach Lester Barnard in 1922, Memphis's football team gave a ring of truth to that old student yell about Tigers. The team adopted a motto – "Every Man a Tiger" – and went on to score 174 points while allowing its opponents just 29 points. The Tiger nickname continued on with students and alumni, eventually being adopted as the official nickname for the University of Memphis in 1939.

=== Mascot ===
The university's current official costume mascot is Pouncer.

It was previously TOM III, a live bengal tiger who died on September 18, 2020. The university was one of a few schools in the country that kept a live tiger as a mascot, although the practice of live animals serving as university mascots is carried on by a number of other universities.

== Conference affiliations ==
American logo in Memphis' colors

NCAA

- Missouri Valley Conference (1968–1973)
- Metro Conference (1975–1991)
- Great Midwest Conference (1991–1995)
- Conference USA (1995–2013)
- American Conference (2013–present)

== Varsity sports ==
Men's sports	Women's sports
Baseball	Basketball
Basketball	Cross country
Cross country	Golf
Football	Rifle
Golf	Soccer
Rifle	Softball
Soccer	Tennis
Tennis	Track and field^{†}
Track and field^{†}	Volleyball
† – Track and field includes both indoor and outdoor.

=== Men's basketball ===
The Memphis Tigers men's basketball program first gained national prominence when it reached the 1973 NCAA Division I basketball championship game. The Tigers, led by Larry Finch, Larry Kenon, Ronnie Robinson, Bill Cook and others, eventually lost to John Wooden's UCLA Bruins, led by Bill Walton.

The Tigers continued an era of excellence throughout the 1980s and went to the Final Four in 1985 losing to Villanova, the ultimate winner of the tournament. The 1985 Final Four trip has since been vacated by the NCAA due to several recruiting violations committed by head coach Dana Kirk and his staff. Success continued through much of the 1990s. Under head coach John Calipari, the Tigers reached the Elite Eight three years in a row (2006–2008) and those same years won the conference championship, going undefeated in conference play in 2007 and 2008. Their record for those three seasons is 106–9. In 2007, the team was ranked #1 in ESPN's and CBSSports.com Pre-Season Polls and for the first time in 25 years, earned a #1 ranking on January 21, 2008, in both the AP Poll and the ESPN/USA Today Coaches' Poll. The 2008 season took the Tigers to the Final Four where Memphis lost the championship game to the Kansas Jayhawks in overtime, but later the Tigers' season and NCAA tournament appearance were vacated. In 2009, the Tigers entered the NCAA tournament as a No. 2 seed. However, they lost in the Sweet Sixteen to Missouri, 102–91. In April 2009, Josh Pastner was named head coach of the Tigers. He led the Tigers to four NCAA tournament appearances in his first five years, but never advanced past the round of 32 and missed the postseason entirely in his sixth and seventh seasons. In April 2016, a month after he had been named Sporting News Coach of the Year, Tubby Smith was hired as the new head coach of the Tigers. Smith was fired after the 2017–18 season and was replaced by former Tigers and NBA star Penny Hardaway.

Perennial rivals include Louisville, former American Conference foe Cincinnati, Ole Miss, UAB, the Southern Miss, and in-state rival Tennessee. The world record holder for the highest slam dunk (12 feet from floor to rim) is a former University of Memphis basketball forward, and current Harlem Globetrotter Michael Wilson. At home, the Tigers play on Beale Street in the state-of-the-art FedExForum.

=== Women's basketball ===
The Memphis Tigers women's basketball team competes in the American Conference. They previously competed in Conference USA in which they have won two Conference USA conference tournament championships and, prior to that two Metro Conference tournament championships. They play home games at Elma Roane Fieldhouse

==== Woman's basketball assault charge ====
Jamirah Shutes, a senior guard on the Memphis women’s basketball team, pleaded not guilty to an assault charge after she was accused of punching a Bowling Green player in the face following the Memphis Tigers' loss in the Women’s National Invitational Tournament (WNIT) on March 24, 2023, officials confirmed.

=== Men's soccer ===
Since 1982, the Memphis Men's soccer program has played at a competitive level. The program began in the Great Midwest Conference and then moved to Conference USA in 1995. In 2013, the Tigers' soccer team, and all of the tiger athletics, moved to the new American Athletic Conference. The Tigers won the Conference USA championship in 2004.

==== Coach Richie Grant ====
In 1999, Richie Grant took over the University of Memphis Soccer Program and remained at the helm for 14 years. He is the most successful Memphis Soccer coach the university has had since the program started. Grant got his start in collegiate coaching in 1995, taking over the NAIA program at Lambuth University. During his four seasons at Lambuth, Grant won over 50 games and three conference championships.

Coach Grant began his career at Memphis with a below average 7–11–1 record. However, the next season Coach Grant and his team won a then-program record 14 games and finished fourth in the C-USA regular season standings. That 14 win season resulted in Coach Grant receiving his first C-USA Coach of the Year honor in 2000. In 2004 Coach Grant received his second C-USA Coach of the Year award when Memphis won a school-record 16 games, made its first NCAA Tournament appearance since 1993 and had the program's first All-American selection in Daton O'Brien.

As a player, Grant was a three-time NAIA All-America defender and was twice named the NAIA District V Player of the Year at Green Mountain College in Poultney, Vt. Grant received his bachelor's degree in leisure resources and facilities management at Green Mountain College and in 1993 and went on to play one season for the a semi-pro team called the Minnesota Thunder. Coach Grant is married to Lady Tigers soccer assistant coach Jodi Grant and has one daughter and one son.

==== Stadium ====
The Tigers practice and play at the on-campus soccer and track stadium, beginning in 2019. They used to play at Mike Rose Soccer Complex, which has multiple fields in addition to the 2,500-seat stadium, from 2001 to 2018.

==== Professional players ====
Over the course of Memphis Soccer, the program has developed some great players. Five of those players went on to play at the professional level. The players are as follows:

- Andy Metcalf: 2006 19th Pick in MLS Supplemental Draft by D.C. United, D.C. United (MLS – 2006), Atlanta Silverbacks (2007)
- Dayton O'Brien: 2006 third round (33rd overall) pick in the MLS SuperDraft by the Columbus Crew, Columbus Crew (MLS – 2006), Atlanta Silverbacks (2007)
- Daniel Dobson: Kansas City Wizards (MLS – 2005), Chivas USA
- Sean Fraser: Calgary Storm, Edmonton Aviators, Toronto Lynx, Edmonton Drillers
- Michael Coburn: Dundalk FC, Shelbourne FC
- Omar Jarun: Atlanta Silverbacks (2007), Otawwa Fury FC (2014),

=== Football ===
The University of Memphis football program dates back to 1912.

After decades of independence, the Memphis football program competed in Conference USA until 2013. Then the football team joined the American Athletic Conference, now known as the American Conference. The Tigers' current head coach is Charles Huff, who was hired after the 2025 season to replace Ryan Silverfield, who had left for the head coaching vacancy at Arkansas. The Tigers' home field is 62,380-seat Simmons Bank Liberty Stadium. The U of M played in five bowl games in six seasons from 2003 to 2008. In 2005, the Tigers football team was led in the Motor City Bowl by DeAngelo Williams, a then-senior All-American running back and eventual first-round draft pick by the Carolina Panthers of the NFL.

=== Men's golf ===
The men's golf team has won six conference championship:

- Missouri Valley Conference (1): 1967
- Metro Conference (2): 1976, 1988
- Great Midwest Conference (1): 1992
- Conference USA (1): 2012
- American Conference (1): 2019

Hillman Robbins won the NCAA Championship in 1954.

=== Memphis Tigers Spirit Squads ===
The Memphis Pom squad is recognized as one of the best collegiate dance squads in the country, having won national championships in 1987, 1988, 1989, 1990, 1991, 1992, 1993, 1994, 1995, 2000, 2007, 2008, 2011, 2012, 2021, and 2024.

== Notable alumni ==
Recent professional athletes from the University of Memphis include:

=== Baseball ===
- Dan Uggla (second baseman, Atlanta Braves)
- Hunter Goodman (catcher, Colorado Rockies)

=== Basketball ===
- Elliot Williams (guard, Portland Trail Blazers)
- Tyreke Evans (guard, Indiana Pacers) (2010 NBA Rookie of the Year)
- Derrick Rose (guard, Memphis Grizzlies) (2009 NBA Rookie of the Year, 2011 NBA MVP)
- Chris Douglas-Roberts (guard, Boston Celtics)
- Joey Dorsey (center, Olympiakos Piraeus)
- Earl Barron (center, Phoenix Suns)
- Rodney Carney (guard/forward, Golden State Warriors)
- Sean Banks
- Antonio Burks (guard, KK Crvena zvezda)
- Anfernee "Penny" Hardaway (guard; four-time NBA All-Star and three-time All-NBA; now the Tigers' head coach)
- Keith Lee
- Dajuan Wagner
- Lorenzen Wright
- Shawne Williams (Forward, Miami Heat)
- Elliot Perry
- Darius Washington Jr.
- Cedric Henderson
- Will Barton Shooting guard / Small forward

=== Football ===
- DeAngelo Williams (Carolina Panthers, Pittsburgh Steelers)
- Stephen Gostkowski (New England Patriots)
- Dontari Poe (Kansas City Chiefs)
- Tony Brown (Carolina Panthers, Miami Dolphins, San Francisco 49ers, Carolina Panthers, Amsterdam Admirals, Tennessee Titans)
- Isaac Bruce (Los Angeles Rams, St. Louis Rams, San Francisco 49ers)
- Mike McKenzie (Green Bay Packers, New Orleans Saints)
- Brandon McDonald (Cleveland Browns, Arizona Cardinals, Detroit Lions)
- Jerome Woods (Kansas City Chiefs)
- Jake Elliott (Philadelphia Eagles)
- Tony Pollard (Dallas Cowboys, Tennessee Titans)
- Antonio Gibson (Washington Commanders)

== See also ==
- List of college athletic programs in Tennessee
