= UAB Blazers men's soccer =

American college soccer team

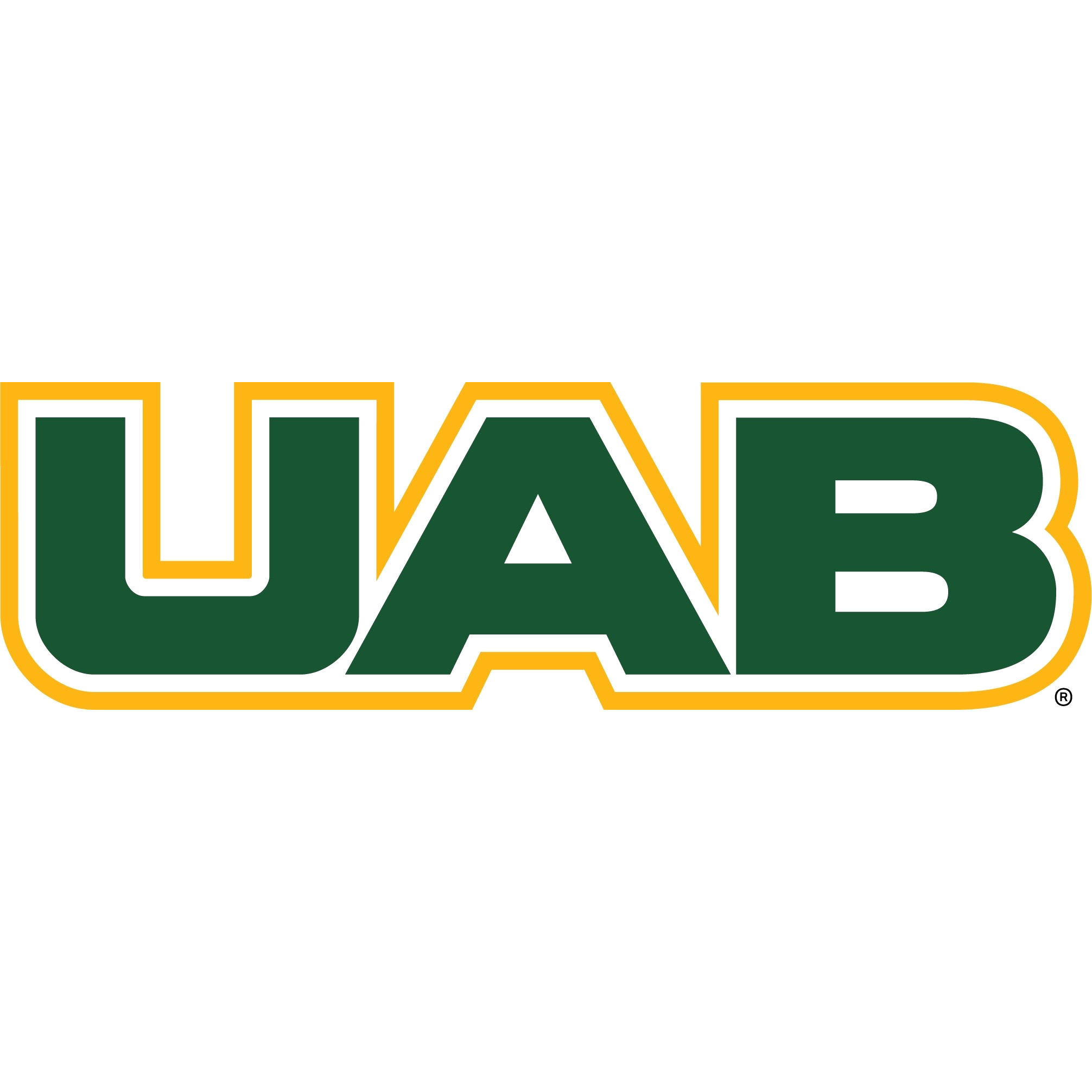
- Founded: 1979
- University: University of Alabama at Birmingham
- Head coach: Alaric Pierce
- Conference: American Athletic Conference
- Location: Birmingham, Alabama (USA)
- Stadium: PNC Field (capacity: 5,000)
- Nickname: Blazers
- Colors: UAB Green and UAB Gold
Home	Away

NCAA tournament appearances
- 1994, 1999, 2000, 2001, 2006, 2011, 2012, 2013, 2014

Conference tournament championships
- 1994, 1999

Conference regular season championships
- 1994, 1995, 1999, 2011

The UAB Blazers men's soccer team is an intercollegiate varsity sports program at the University of Alabama at Birmingham. As of the upcoming 2022 season, the college soccer program competes in the NCAA Division I American Conference.

== Roster ==
As of Jul 2026

Note: Flags indicate national team as defined under FIFA eligibility rules; some limited exceptions apply. Players may hold more than one non-FIFA nationality.

No.	Pos.	Nation	Player
1	GK	FRA	Ethan Schulz
2	DF	DEN	Ole Jessen
3	DF	USA	Carson Brice
4	DF	DEN	Frederik Danslet
5	DF	GER	Tim Pusback
6	MF	ESP	Diego Quevedo
7	FW	ENG	Rylie Siddall
8	MF	SWE	Gael Zackrisson
9	FW	USA	Gael Rizzo
10	FW	KOR	Tony Kim
11	FW	GHA	Humphrey Doh
12	DF	USA	Noah Wanzer
13	GK	GER	Noah Ahlers
14	MF	USA	Noah Melendez

No.	Pos.	Nation	Player
15	DF	GIB	Johnny Rush
16	FW	USA	Lucas Nordin
17	MF	USA	Brody Pike
18	MF	USA	Justin Vallejo
19	MF	ESP	Guillermo Martin
20	FW	USA	Camren Thompson
21	MF	ITA	Matthew Garcia
22	DF	USA	Luke Alexander
23	DF	AUT	Leon Grube
24	DF	KOR	Ham Jiwon
25	DF	ENG	Ed Tassell
26	-	USA	Sam Roberson
27	GK	USA	Bennett De Spong
28	GK	USA	Brock Marlow

== History ==
UAB began a men's soccer program back in 1979. Throughout its history, UAB has enjoyed great success in the men's soccer program. The men's team has been in the NCAA Tournament a total of 7 times including 2 Sweet Sixteen appearances and 1 Elite Eight appearance in 1999. The men's team has been ranked nationally numerous times throughout its history, including top 25 rankings in 16 of the last 18 seasons. One of UAB's biggest wins in the men's team history came when UAB upset the #1-ranked UCLA Bruins in 1997 by a score of 2–0. UAB would upset another #1-ranked team in 2006 when they beat the SMU Mustangs by a score of 2–1.

UAB's most recent conference change was announced during the 2021–22 offseason, when it left Conference USA (C-USA) for The American. The decision of the Sun Belt Conference to reinstate its men's soccer league effective with the 2022 season dropped the C-USA men's soccer membership to four. Of these four schools, three, including UAB, were scheduled to fully move from C-USA to The American in the near future, most likely in July 2023. Accordingly, The American brought all four remaining C-USA men's soccer teams into its own soccer league.

== Stadium ==
The men's team began to play to play its home games at UAB's PNC Field (originally BBVA Compass Field, later BBVA Field) in 2015. Prior to this, the Blazers played at their old venue, West Campus Field.

Since 1993, the men's team has won nearly 80% of its games played at West Campus Field. UAB has frequently been among the national leaders in soccer attendance, finishing as high as 16th nationally in average attendance. The highest attended home soccer game in UAB history came in 2011 when 3,141 fans saw the Blazers defeat Clemson 2–1.

== Fans ==
Although many traditions, cheers, and chants take place at each home game, there is one that "stands above the rest," according to former head coach Mike Getman. Led by alumni super-fan Andrew Robillard, who has not missed a UAB men's home soccer match in 22 seasons, the whole student section sings "God Bless America" in unity. The Hillsborough Times has reported this tradition as one of its "12 College Sports Traditions you Don't Want to Miss."

== Notable alumni ==
- Dejan Jakovic
- Babayele Sodade
- Lars Willemse
- Tony McManus
- Jerson Monteiro
- Carl Woszczynski
- Ian Svantesson
- Michal Mravec
- Jason McLaughlin
- Alex Clay
- Sandy Gbandi
- Stuart Schulman
- Jose Luis Rayo
- Ivan Piola

== Titles ==
=== Conferences ===
Great Midwest Conference

- Tournament (1): 1994
- Regular season (1): 1994

Conference USA

- Tournament (1): 1999
- Regular season (3): 1995, 1999, 2011
