= 2007 Conference USA men's soccer tournament =

2007 C-USA men's soccer tournament
Tournament details
- Country: United States
- Dates: 14–18 November 2007
- Teams: 8

Final positions
- Champions: Tulsa (1st title)
- Runners-up: FIU

Tournament statistics
- Matches played: 7
- Goals scored: 27 (3.86 per match)
- Top goal scorer: Juan Guerra (3 goals)

The 2007 Conference USA men's soccer tournament was the thirteenth edition of the Conference USA Men's Soccer Tournament. The tournament decided the Conference USA champion and guaranteed representative into the 2007 NCAA Division I Men's Soccer Championship. The tournament was hosted by the University of Alabama at Birmingham and the games were played at West Campus Field.

== Bracket ==
Quarterfinals; Wed., Thurs. Nov. 14–15
1	Tulsa	1
8	UAB	0
4	South Carolina	2^{OT}
5	Memphis	1
2	SMU	1
7	FIU	3
3	Kentucky	1
6	Marshall	3

Semifinals; Friday Nov. 16
1	Tulsa	4
4	South Carolina	1
7	FIU	3^{OT}
6	Marshall	2

Final; Sunday Nov. 18
1	Tulsa	3
7	FIU	2

== Schedule ==
=== Quarterfinals ===
November 14 Match 1	SMU	1–3	FIU	Birmingham, Alabama
	Chevannes 7'	Report	Guerra 55'; Caporaletti 75'; Cabas 86'	Stadium: West Campus Field; Referee: Shane Butler

November 14 Match 2	Kentucky	1–3	Marshall	Birmingham, Alabama
	Turnbull 22'	Report	Daniele 38'; Shergill 45'; Flunder 53'	Stadium: West Campus Field; Referee: Rizal Milliken

November 14 Match 3	South Carolina	2–1 (a.e.t.)	Memphis	Birmingham, Alabama
	Lindsay 15'; Scannella 91' (pen.)	Report	Walsh 14'	Stadium: West Campus Field; Referee: Abdu Bensalah

November 15 Match 4	Tulsa	1–0	UAB	Birmingham, Alabama
	DeFreitas 10'	Report		Stadium: West Campus Field; Attendance: 559; Referee: Tony Delios

=== Semifinals ===
November 16 Match 5	Marshall	2–3 (a.e.t.)	FIU	Birmingham, Alabama
	Daniele 5'; Shergill 73' (pen.)	Report	Franca 39'; Cabas 67'; Guerra 92'	Stadium: West Campus Field; Referee: Mark Gorak

November 16 Match 6	Tulsa	4–1	South Carolina	Birmingham, Alabama
	Salem 26'; DeFreitas 53'; Parada 59'; Poeschk 88'	Report	Wiltse 75'	Stadium: West Campus Field; Attendance: 276; Referee: Ken Andres

=== Final ===
November 18 Match 7	Tulsa	3–2	FIU	Birmingham, Alabama
	Burkholder 30', 86'; Goddard 81'	Report	Barbosa 39'; Guerra 60'	Stadium: West Campus Field; Attendance: 266; Referee: Lou Labbadia

== Statistics ==
=== Goalscorers ===
Rank	Player	Team	Goals
1	Juan Guerra	FIU	3
2	Steven Cabas	FIU	2
2	Avneet Shergill	Marshall	2
2	Eric Burkholder	Tulsa	2
2	Eric DeFreitas	Tulsa	2
6	Bruno Barbosa	FIU	1
6	Chris Caporaletti	FIU	1
6	Mario Franca	FIU	1
6	Masumi Turnbull	Kentucky	1
6	Nick Daniele	Marshall	1
6	John Daniele	Marshall	1
6	Sterling Flunder	Marshall	1
6	Kevin Walsh	Memphis	1
6	Adrian Chevannes	SMU	1
6	Mike Lindsay	South Carolina	1
6	Jeff Scannella	South Carolina	1
6	Mark Wiltse	South Carolina	1
6	Todd Goddard	Tulsa	1
6	Jose Parada	Tulsa	1
6	Kilian Poeschk	Tulsa	1
6	Joe Salem	Tulsa	1

== Awards ==
=== All-Tournament team ===
- Steven Cabas, FIU
- Ainsley Deer, FIU
- Juan Guerra, FIU
- Sterling Flunder, Marshall
- Jeff Lenix, Marshall
- Mike Lindsay, South Carolina
- Mark Wiltse, South Carolina
- Eric Burkholder, Tulsa
- Dominic Cervi, Tulsa
- Chris Clements, Tulsa
- Eric DeFreitas, Tulsa
