= List of NCAA Division I men's soccer teams ranked in the 2019 Top 25 coaches poll =

2019 NCAA Division I
men's soccer
Top 25 coaches poll
←2018 | 2020→

This is a week-by-week listing of the NCAA Division I teams ranked in the 2019 Top 25 coaches poll of the United Soccer Coaches (formerly the National Soccer Coaches Association of America NSCAA), the most widely recognized national collegiate soccer ranking system in the U.S. Several weeks prior to the season and each week during the playing season, the 206 Division I teams are voted on by a panel of 24 coaches from the division during a weekly conference call, with the rankings then announced early on Tuesday afternoon (Eastern Time). The poll has no bearing on the selections for the 2018 NCAA Division I Men's Soccer Championship, and the coaches association states: "United Soccer Coaches College Rankings are an indicator of week-to-week status of qualified programs and in no way should be used as a guide or indicator of eligibility for championship selection."

== Rankings ==
First place votes received in parentheses; rv = received votes. Source =

| School | Preseason August 8 | Week 1 | Week 2 | Week 3 | Week 4 | Week 5 | Week 6 | Week 7 | Week 8 | Week 9 | Week 10 | Week 11 | Week 12 | Final Poll |
|---|---|---|---|---|---|---|---|---|---|---|---|---|---|---|
| Georgetown | 13 | 6 | 5 | 3 (1) | 2 (3) | 5 | 12 | 13 | 7 | 3 | 3 | 3 | 2 | 1 (25) |
| Virginia | 12 | 7 | 6 | 5 | 3 (4) | 1 (20) | 1 (25) | 1 (22) | 6 | 4 | 4 | 2 (6) | 1 (27) | 2 |
| Wake Forest | 4 (4) | 1 (16) | 1 (24) | 1 (26) | 7 | 3 | 6 | 4 (1) | 2 | 7 | 7 | 7 | 9 | 3 (1) |
| Stanford | 5 | 4 (2) | 3 | 2 | 1 (19) | 2 | 7 | 5 | 5 | 5 | 5 | 4 (1) | 7 | 4 (1) |
| Clemson | rv | 19 | 13 | 7 | 4 | 6 | 11 | 8 | 3 | 2 | 2 | 1 (19) | 3 | 5 |
| Washington | rv | 13 | 8 | 12 | 10 | 7 | 2 | 2 (4) | 1 (21) | 1 (21) | 1 (23) | 6 (1) | 4 | 6 |
| SMU | rv | rv | 22 | 8 | 8 | 4 | 3 | 3 | 12 | 12 | 11 | 10 | 5 | 7 |
| UC Santa Barbara | — | — | — | — | — | rv | rv | 17 | 20 | 19 | 15 | 16 | 22 | 8 |
| Indiana | 2 (6) | 2 (3) | 4 (1) | 4 (1) | 5 (1) | 8 | 4 | 6 | 10 | 10 | 9 | 8 | 6 | 9 |
| UCF | 15 | 15 | 16 | 13 | 12 | 11 | 9 | 11 | 8 | 6 | 6 | 5 | 8 | 10 |
| Marshall | — | — | — | — | rv | rv | rv | 21 | 15 | 20 | 14 | 13 | 11 | 11 |
| St. John's | — | rv | 19 | 9 | 9 | 12 | 10 | 7 | 4 | 8 | 8 | 14 | 14 | 12 |
| Virginia Tech | 16 | 10 | 9 | 17 | 18 | 22 | 22 | rv | 25 | 22 | 22 | 19 | 23 | 13 |
| Providence | — | — | — | — | — | — | — | — | — | — | — | rv | 21 | 14 |
| Saint Mary's | 11 | 8 | 7 | 6 | 6 | 10 | 8 | 9 | 13 | 11 | 12 | 11 | 10 | 15 |
| Missouri State | — | — | — | rv | 19 | 17 | 14 | 14 | 9 | 9 | 10 | 9 | 12 | 16 |
| Michigan | 24 | rv | rv | — | — | — | — | — | — | — | — | — | 17 | 17 |
| Penn State | — | — | — | — | rv | rv | — | rv | 19 | 16 | 13 | 12 | 13 | 18 |
| Seattle | rv | rv | — | — | — | — | — | — | — | rv | rv | 21 | 20 | 19 |
| Louisville | 14 | rv | 20 | rv | 17 | 24 | rv | rv | rv | 25 | rv | — | rv | 20 |
| Charlotte | 21 | 17 | 12 | 10 | 11 | 9 | 5 | 10 | 17 | 18 | 17 | 17 | 15 | 21 |
| New Hampshire | rv | 22 | 21 | 18 | 15 | 15 | 13 | 15 | 14 | 14 | 18 | 18 | 16 | 22 |
| Kentucky | 8 | 9 | 17 | 21 | 23 | 19 | 16 | 20 | 16 | 15 | 16 | 15 | 19 | 23 |
| Campbell | — | — | — | — | — | — | — | — | — | rv | rv | rv | 24 | 24 |
| UC Davis | — | — | rv | — | — | — | — | rv | rv | rv | 24 | 24 | 18 | 25 |
| Maryland | 1 (13) | 3 (9) | 24 | 25 | rv | rv | 25 | 25 | 22 | 17 | 23 | 22 | rv | rv |
| Pitt | — | — | — | — | — | — | — | — | rv | rv | rv | 25 | rv | rv |
| Coastal Carolina | — | 12 | 15 | rv | rv | rv | — | — | — | — | — | — | — | rv |
| West Virginia | 23 | 24 | rv | 20 | rv | 23 | rv | — | — | — | — | — | — | rv |
| Wright State | rv | — | — | — | — | — | — | — | — | — | — | — | — | rv |
| NC State | rv | rv | rv | rv | — | rv | 20 | 23 | 23 | rv | rv | rv | rv | rv |
| Loyola Marymount | — | — | — | rv | 24 | rv | rv | — | — | rv | rv | rv | rv | rv |
| Rhode Island | rv | — | — | — | — | — | — | — | rv | rv | rv | rv | rv | rv |
| FIU | — | rv | rv | 22 | 16 | 13 | 15 | 12 | 11 | 13 | 19 | 23 | rv | rv |
| Syracuse | rv | — | — | — | — | — | — | — | — | rv | — | — | — | rv |
| Yale | — | — | — | rv | rv | rv | rv | 24 | 24 | rv | rv | rv | 25 | rv |
| Boston College | — | rv | rv | rv | — | — | — | rv | rv | — | — | — | — | rv |
| James Madison | 17 | rv | rv | — | 20 | 16 | 17 | 18 | rv | 21 | rv | rv | rv | — |
| UNCW | rv | — | — | — | — | — | — | — | rv | rv | 21 | 20 | rv | — |
| Butler | — | — | — | — | — | — | — | — | — | — | — | rv | rv | — |
| California | — | — | tb | — | — | — | — | — | — | — | — | — | rv | — |
| San Diego | — | — | rv | rv | rv | 25 | 23 | 16 | 18 | 23 | rv | rv | rv | — |
| Oral Roberts | — | — | — | rv | rv | rv | rv | rv | rv | 24 | 20 | rv | rv | — |
| Western Michigan | — | — | — | — | — | — | — | — | — | rv | 25 | rv | — | — |
| Princeton | rv | rv | — | — | — | — | — | — | — | rv | rv | rv | — | — |
| Notre Dame | 9 | 11 | 10 | 16 | 21 | rv | rv | rv | — | rv | rv | rv | — | — |
| Central Arkansas | — | — | — | — | — | — | — | — | — | — | rv | rv | — | — |
| Memphis | — | — | — | — | — | — | rv | rv | rv | rv | rv | — | — | — |
| Loyola Maryland | rv | — | — | — | — | — | — | — | — | rv | rv | — | — | — |
| North Carolina | 6 (2) | 20 | 18 | 11 | 14 | 20 | 18 | 19 | 21 | rv | — | — | — | — |
| UIC | — | — | — | — | rv | — | — | — | — | rv | — | — | — | — |
| Saint Louis | rv | — | — | — | — | — | — | rv | rv | rv | — | — | — | — |
| Loyola Chicago | — | rv | — | — | — | — | — | — | rv | — | — | — | — | — |
| Mount St. Mary's | — | rv | rv | — | — | — | — | — | rv | — | — | — | — | — |
| Navy | — | — | rv | rv | 25 | 21 | 19 | 22 | rv | — | — | — | — | — |
| Duke | 10 | 5 | 2 (2) | 15 | rv | 18 | 21 | rv | — | — | — | — | — | — |
| Utah Valley | rv | — | — | — | — | — | — | rv | — | — | — | — | — | — |
| Cal State Fullerton | — | — | 23 | 14 | 13 | 14 | 24 | rv | — | — | — | — | — | — |
| Creighton | rv | rv | rv | — | rv | rv | rv | — | — | — | — | — | — | — |
| Rutders | — | — | rv | 24 | 22 | rv | — | — | — | — | — | — | — | — |
| Cornell | — | — | — | — | — | rv | — | — | — | — | — | — | — | — |
| UTRGV | — | — | — | — | — | rv | — | — | — | — | — | — | — | — |
| Ohio State | — | — | — | rv | rv | rv | — | — | — | — | — | — | — | — |
| Xavier | — | 14 | 11 | 19 | rv | — | — | — | — | — | — | — | — | — |
| UC Riverside | — | — | — | rv | rv | — | — | — | — | — | — | — | — | — |
| Florida Gulf Coast | — | 18 | 14 | rv | rv | — | — | — | — | — | — | — | — | — |
| Cal State Northridge | — | rv | rv | 23 | — | — | — | — | — | — | — | — | — | — |
| South Florida | — | — | — | rv | — | — | — | — | — | — | — | — | — | — |
| UCLA | rv | — | — | rv | — | — | — | — | — | — | — | — | — | — |
| Air Force | 19 | 25 | — | rv | — | — | — | — | — | — | — | — | — | — |
| Lehigh | — | — | — | rv | — | — | — | — | — | — | — | — | — | — |
| Villanova | — | — | rv | rv | — | — | — | — | — | — | — | — | — | — |
| Bowling Green | — | — | 25 | rv | — | — | — | — | — | — | — | — | — | — |
| Mercer | — | — | rv | rv | — | — | — | — | — | — | — | — | — | — |
| Oregon State | 22 | rv | rv | — | — | — | — | — | — | — | — | — | — | — |
| Michigan State | 7 | 16 | rv | — | — | — | — | — | — | — | — | — | — | — |
| Portland | 20 | — | rv | — | — | — | — | — | — | — | — | — | — | — |
| Akron | 3 (2) | 21 | rv | — | — | — | — | — | — | — | — | — | — | — |
| UConn | rv | 23 | rv | — | — | — | — | — | — | — | — | — | — | — |
| Fairleigh Dickinson | — | — | rv | — | — | — | — | — | — | — | — | — | — | — |
| Denver | 18 | rv | — | — | — | — | — | — | — | — | — | — | — | — |
| Hofstra | — | rv | — | — | — | — | — | — | — | — | — | — | — | — |
| Georgia Southern | — | rv | — | — | — | — | — | — | — | — | — | — | — | — |
| LIU | — | rv | — | — | — | — | — | — | — | — | — | — | — | — |
| UC Irvine | 25 | rv | — | — | — | — | — | — | — | — | — | — | — | — |
| Wisconsin | rv | — | — | — | — | — | — | — | — | — | — | — | — | — |
| Pacific | rv | — | — | — | — | — | — | — | — | — | — | — | — | — |
| Colgate | rv | — | — | — | — | — | — | — | — | — | — | — | — | — |
| VCU | rv | — | — | — | — | — | — | — | — | — | — | — | — | — |
| Furman | rv | — | — | — | — | — | — | — | — | — | — | — | — | — |
| Lipscomb | rv | — | — | — | — | — | — | — | — | — | — | — | — | — |

== See also ==
- 2019 NCAA Division I men's soccer rankings (a compilation of four separate polls)
