= 2015 Conference USA men's soccer tournament =

Tournament details
- Country: United States
- Teams: 11

Final positions
- Champions: FIU
- Runners-up: Marshall

Tournament statistics
- Matches played: 7
- Goals scored: 12 (1.71 per match)
- Top goal scorer: Daniel Gonzalez (2)

Awards
- Best player: Arthur Clapot

The 2015 Conference USA men's soccer tournament was the 21st edition of the tournament. It determined the Conference USA's automatic berth into the 2015 NCAA Division I Men's Soccer Championship.

The FIU Golden Panthers won the tournament, besting the Marshall Thundering Herd in the championship match.

== Qualification ==
2015 Conference USA men's soccer standings
	Conf.					Overall
Team	W		L		T	W		L		T
No. 17 Kentucky +	7	–	0	–	1	12	–	5	–	2
Charlotte +	6	–	1	–	1	10	–	6	–	2
No. 21 South Carolina +	6	–	2	–	0	11	–	8	–	2
Old Dominion	3	–	3	–	2	8	–	5	–	3
No. 16 Fla. International ‡	3	–	4	–	1	12	–	7	–	1
New Mexico	2	–	4	–	2	8	–	6	–	4
Marshall	2	–	5	–	1	8	–	9	–	1
UAB	2	–	6	–	0	5	–	11	–	0
Florida Atlantic	1	–	7	–	0	2	–	12	–	2
‡-Tournament champion +- Invited to the NCAA Division I Men's Soccer Championship; As of November 22, 2015; Rankings from NSCAA

The top seven teams in Conference USA based on their conference record qualified for the tournament. Top-seeded Kentucky earned a bye to the semifinal round.

== Bracket ==
Quarterfinals; Wednesday Nov. 11
4	Old Dominion	2
5	FIU	4
2	Charlotte	1 (1)
7	Marshall (pen.)	1 (3)
3	South Carolina	1
6	New Mexico	0

Semifinals; Friday Nov. 13
1	Kentucky	0
5	FIU	1
7	Marshall	1
3	South Carolina	0

Final; Sunday Nov. 15
5	FIU	1
7	Marshall	0

== Schedule ==
=== Quarterfinals ===
November 11	Old Dominion	2–4	FIU	Charlotte, North Carolina
2:00 PM ET	Henriquez 33'; Condotta 47'	Report	Marie 12'; Betancur 26'; Gonzalez 79'; Campion-Hinds 82'	Stadium: Transamerica Field; Attendance: 711; Referee: Chris Penso

November 11	South Carolina	1–0	New Mexico	Charlotte, North Carolina
4:30 PM ET	Gudjonsson 78'	Report		Stadium: Transamerica Field; Attendance: 711; Referee: Chico Grajeda

November 11	Charlotte	1–1 (a.e.t.) (3–5 p)	Marshall	Charlotte, North Carolina
7:00 PM ET	Steadman 27'	Report	Gordon 29'	Stadium: Transamerica Field; Attendance: 711; Referee: Alex Sorondo
	Penalties
	Parker (penalty scored); Waechter (penalty scored); Rodriguez (penalty scored); Bronico (penalty missed)		(penalty scored) Forde; (penalty scored) Duchesne; (penalty scored) Edginton; (penalty scored) Hopkins; (penalty scored) Gordon

=== Semifinals ===
November 13	Kentucky	0–1	FIU	Charlotte, North Carolina
4:30 PM ET		Report	Gonzalez 21'	Stadium: Transamerica Field; Attendance: 307; Referee: Ted Unkel

November 13	South Carolina	0–1	Marshall	Charlotte, North Carolina
7:00 PM ET		Report	Gordon 68'	Stadium: Transamerica Field; Attendance: 307; Referee: Mark Kadlecik

=== Final ===
November 15	FIU	1–0	Marshall	Charlotte, North Carolina
2:00 PM ET	Lopez 75'	Report		Stadium: Transamerica Field; Attendance: 196; Referee: Mark Gorak

== Statistical leaders ==
=== Top goalscorers ===
Rank	Player	College	Goals
1	(Jamaica) Romario Gordon	Marshall	2
1	(United States) Daniel Gonzalez	FIU	2
2	(Puerto Rico) Luis Betancur	FIU	1
2	(United States) Jamar Campion-Hinds	FIU	1
2	(United States) Ryan Condotta	Old Dominion	1
2	(Iceland) Bjorn Gudjonsson	South Carolina	1
2	(United States) Josue Henriquez	Old Dominion	1
2	(United States) Patrick Lopez	FIU	1
2	(France) Paul Marie	FIU	1
2	(United States) Harrison Steadman	Charlotte	1

As of 19 December 2015

== All-Tournament team ==
- Daniel Gonzalez, FIU - Offensive MVP
- Arthur Clapot, FIU - Defensive MVP
- Marvin Hezel, FIU
- Patrick Lopez, FIU
- Dominik Reining, Marshall
- Arthur Duchesne, Marshall
- Rimario Gordon, Marshall
- Charlie Reymann, Kentucky
- Kristoffer Tollefsen, Kentucky
- Tor Nyboe, South Carolina
- Kurtis Turner, South Carolina

== See also ==
- Conference USA
- 2015 Conference USA men's soccer season
- 2015 NCAA Division I men's soccer season
- 2015 NCAA Division I Men's Soccer Championship
