= Avneet =

Avneet is a given name. Notable people with the name include:

- Avneet Kaur (born 2001), Indian actress
- Avneet Sidhu (born 1981), Indian sport shooter
- Avneet Shergill (born 1985), Indian-American soccer player

== See also ==
- Kaur
