= Mike Hamrick =

Biographical details
- Born: Clendenin, West Virginia, U.S.

Playing career
- 1976–1979: Marshall
- Position: Linebacker

Administrative career (AD unless noted)
- 1990–1995: Arkansas–Little Rock
- 1995–2003: East Carolina
- 2003–2009: UNLV
- 2009–2021: Marshall

Mike Hamrick is the former athletic director of the Marshall Thundering Herd. He previously served as AD for the UNLV Rebels, East Carolina Pirates and UALR Trojans. He is a Marshall University alumnus. Hamrick stepped down as athletic director at Marshall to become a special assistant to university president, Jerome A. Gilbert on July 1, 2021.
