= Marshall Thundering Herd =

Intercollegiate sports teams of Marshall University

- University: Marshall University
- NCAA: Division I (FBS)
- Conference: Sun Belt Conference (Note: Marshall Thundering Herd teams compete in the Sun Belt for all sports excluding women's swimming and diving, which currently competes in the American Conference as an affiliate member.)
- Athletic director: Gerald Harrison
- Location: Huntington, West Virginia
- Varsity teams: 16
- Football stadium: Joan C. Edwards Stadium
- Basketball arena: Cam Henderson Center
- Baseball stadium: Jack Cook Field
- Softball stadium: Dot Hicks Field
- Soccer stadium: Veterans Memorial Soccer Complex
- Other venues: Frederick A. Fitch Natatorium; Brian David Fox Tennis Center; Guyan Golf & Country Club
- Nickname: Thundering Herd
- Colors: Kelly green, white and black
- Mascot: Marco the Bison
- Fight song: "Sons of Marshall"
- Cheer: "We Are... Marshall"
- Website: herdzone.com

The Marshall Thundering Herd is the intercollegiate athletic collection of teams that collectively represent the Marshall University in Huntington, West Virginia. Thundering Herd athletic teams compete in the Sun Belt Conference, which are members of the NCAA Division I. The school's official colors are kelly green, white and black. The Marshall Thundering Herd have won 3 NCAA national championships and one NAIA national championship.

== Sports sponsored ==
| Men's sports | Women's sports |
|---|---|
| Baseball | Basketball |
| Basketball | Cross country |
| Cross country | Golf |
| Football | Soccer |
| Golf | Softball |
| Soccer | Swimming and diving |
| Track and field^{1} | Tennis |
| | Track and field^{1} |
| | Volleyball |
^{1} – includes both indoor and outdoor

=== Baseball ===
- Head Coach: Greg Beals
- Stadium: Jack Cook Field
- Conference Championships: 9 (1928, 1929, 1930, 1931, 1933, 1934, 1935, 1978, 1981)
- NCAA tournament Appearances: 2 (1973, 1978)
- All-Americans: 1
- Best Final Ranking: No. 17 (1978 NCAA Collegiate Baseball)
- First Season Played: 1896

Early Marshall baseball teams played on what is now Buskirk Field on campus, but had long since been handicapped by a lack of on-campus facilities and no permanent home field. An on-Campus facility, Jack Cook Field, opened for the 2024 season.

=== Basketball ===
==== Men's basketball ====
- Head Coach: Cornelius Jackson
- Arena: Cam Henderson Center
- Conference Championships: 11 - (Regular season: 1937, 1938, 1939, 1956, 1984, 1987, 1988; Tournament: 1984, 1985, 1987, 2018)
- Postseason Tournament Championships: 2 (1947 NAIB, 2019 CIT)
- NCAA tournament Appearances: 6 (1956, 1972, 1984, 1985, 1987, 2018)
- NIT Tournament Appearances: 5 (1967, 1968, 1973, 1988, 2012)
- NAIB National Championship: 1 (1947)
- All-Americans: 4
- Best Final Ranking: No. 12 (1972 Associated Press)
- First Season Played: 1907

Marshall men's basketball gained notoriety under Cam Henderson, inventor of the fast break and the 2-3 zone defense who coached the team from 1935 to 1955. As head coach of the Herd men's basketball team, Henderson compiled a record of 362-159 and won the 1947 NAIA National Championship. His Marshall teams produced 2 All-Americans, Jule Rivlin and Andy Tonkovich - the latter was selected as the #1 overall pick in the 1948 NBA draft. Henderson also recruited the first African-American to play at the formerly all-white colleges of West Virginia when he signed Hal Greer in 1954. His 1947 championship basketball team spurred the move into the Veterans Memorial Fieldhouse, a 6,500-seat arena that was Marshall's basketball home from 1950 to 1980. The Fieldhouse was replaced in 1981 with the Cam Henderson Center named in his honor.

==== Women's basketball ====
- Head Coach: Juli Fulks
- Arena: Cam Henderson Center
- Conference Championships: 9 - (Regular season: 1985, 1986, 1987, 1988, 1989, 2024; Tournament: 1976, 1997, 2024)
- Postseason Tournament Championships: 1 (2026 WNIT)
- NCAA tournament Appearances: 2 (1997, 2024)
- Postseason Invitational Tournament Appearances: 5 (1971, 2015, 2016, 2019, 2026)
- All-Americans: 1
- First Season Played: 1969

=== Football ===
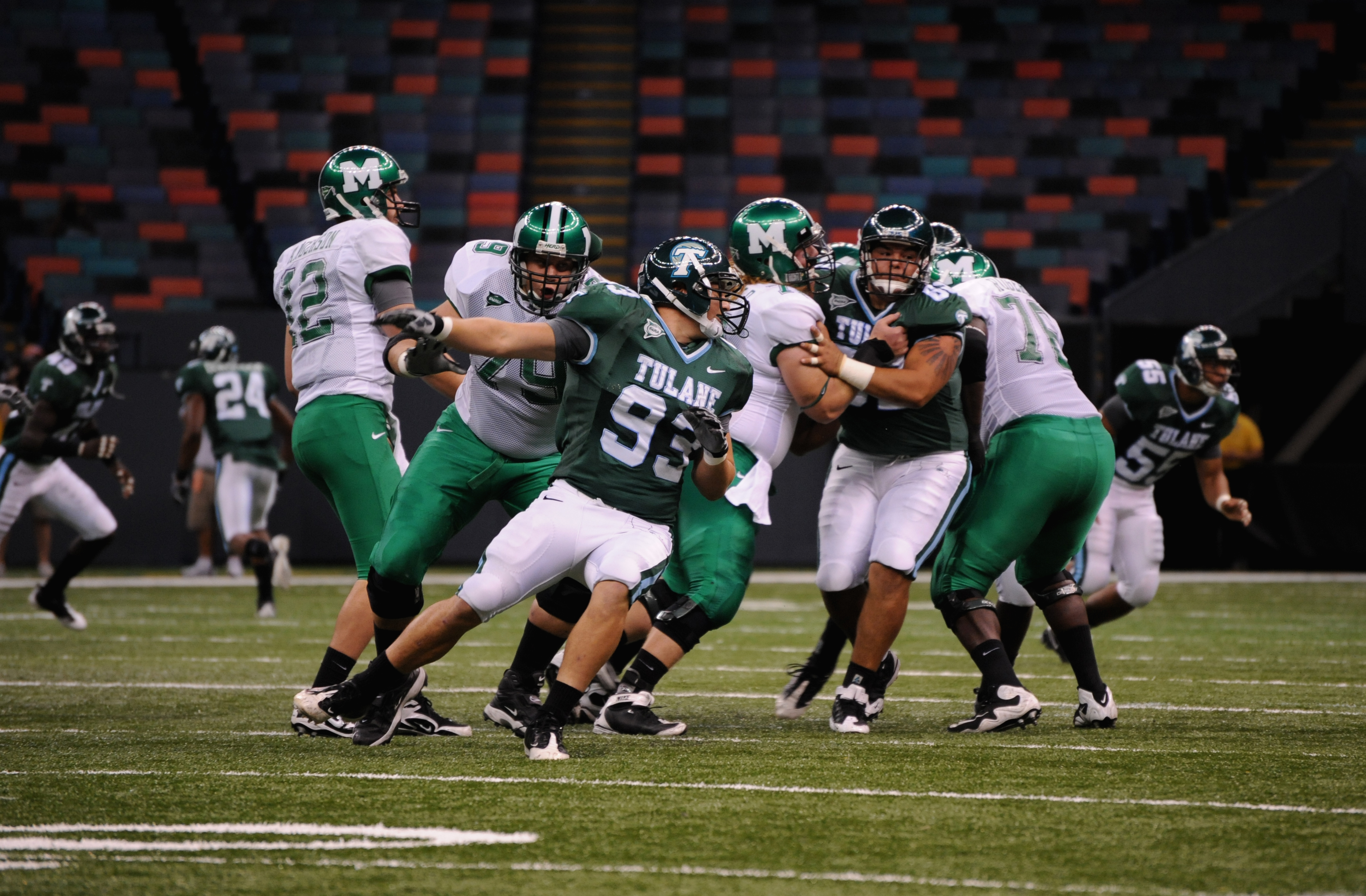
Marshall (in white) v Tulane game in 2009

- Head Coach: Tony Gibson
- Stadium: Joan C. Edwards Stadium
- Conference Championships: 14 - (1925, 1928, 1931, 1937, 1988, 1994, 1996, 1997, 1998, 1999, 2000, 2002, 2014, 2024)
- Post-season Bowl Appearances: 21 (1947, 1997, 1998, 1999, 2000, 2001, 2002, 2004, 2009, 2011, 2013, 2014, 2015, 2017, 2018, 2019, 2020, 2021, 2022, 2023, 2024)
- NCAA Division I FCS National Championships: 2 (1992, 1996)
- Best Final Ranking: FBS No. 10 (1999 Associated Press, 1999 Coaches' Poll) / FCS No. 1 (1996 Sports Network)
- First Season Played: 1895

Historically, the Herd played on Central Field through 1928, at Fairfield Stadium from 1928 until 1990, and at Joan C. Edwards Stadium since 1991.

On November 14, 1970, Southern Airways Flight 932 crashed near Kenova, West Virginia and killed all 75 passengers on board, including 37 members of the Thundering Herd football team. The plane disaster and rebuilding of the program was the subject of the documentary Marshall University: Ashes to Glory, and these events were depicted in the 2006 Warner Brothers motion picture, We Are Marshall, starring Matthew McConaughey and Matthew Fox.

=== Golf ===
==== Men's golf ====
- Head Coach: Matt Grobe
- Home Course: Guyan Golf and Country Club
- Conference Team Championships: 2 (1962, 1966)
- Conference Individual Champions: 10
- NCAA tournament Team Appearances: 5 (1955, 1957, 1962, 1976, 1993)
- NCAA tournament Individual Appearances: 11
- All-Americans: 1
- Best Final Ranking: 11th (1962 NCAA Golf Championships)
- First Season Played: 1949

Since its inception in 1968, the Marshall Invitational held at the Guyan Golf and Country Club has become one of the top collegiate golf tournaments in the Eastern United States. It had been held annually in April until being moved to September in 2010. It was renamed the Joe Feaganes Marshall Invitational in 2013 in honor of the Herd's longtime coach who led the program from 1972 to 2012.

==== Women's golf ====
- Head Coach: Brooke Burkhammer
- Home Course: Guyan Golf and Country Club
- AIWA Tournament Appearances: 1 (1981)
- First Season Played: 1974–1983, restarted 2002

Marshall initially fielded a women's golf team from 1974 to 1983 and competed in the Association for Intercollegiate Athletics for Women championships. The program relaunched in 2002 competing in the NCAA.

=== Soccer ===
==== Men's soccer ====
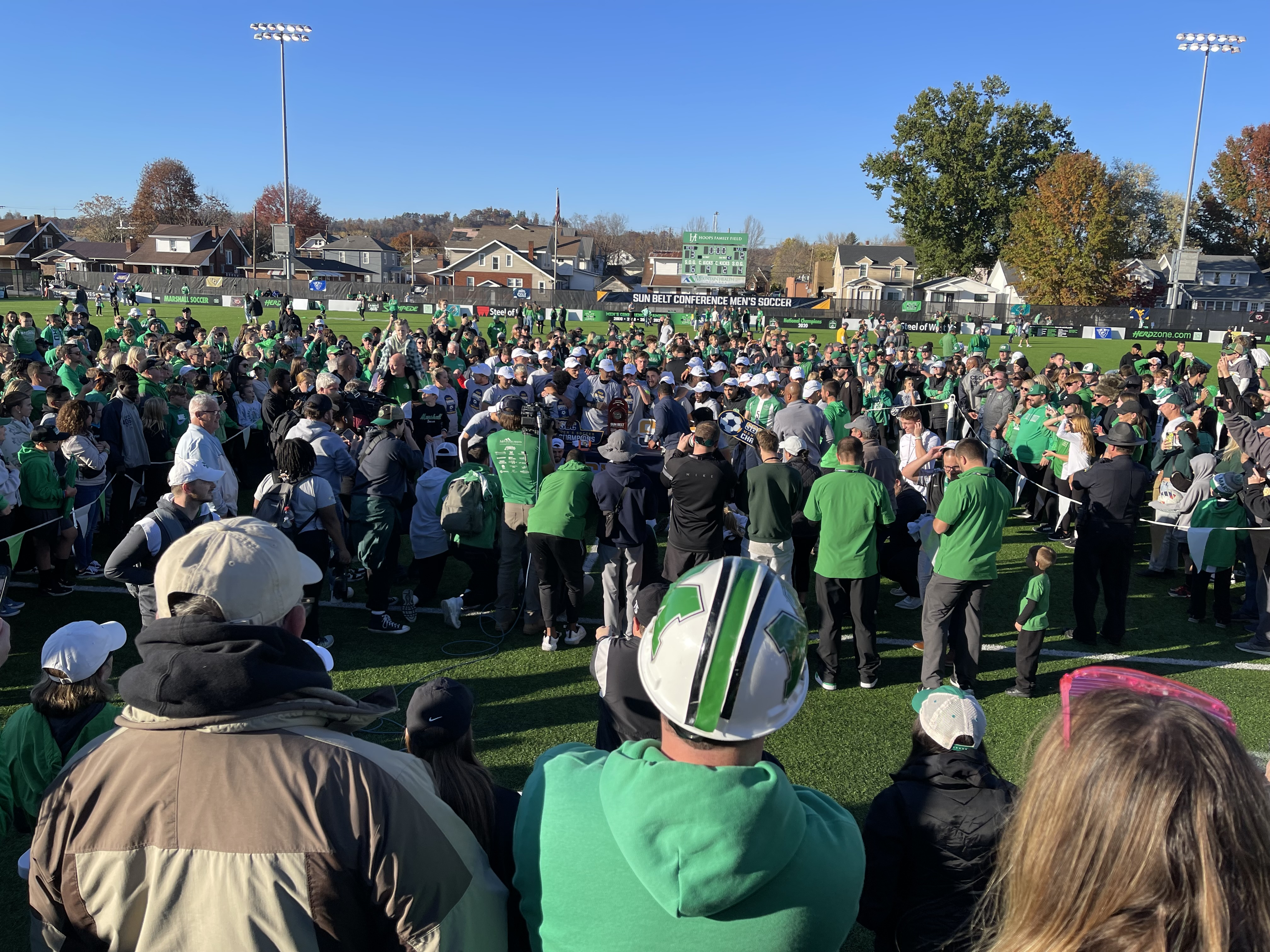
Marshall soccer players and fans celebrating the 2023 Conference championship won

- Head Coach: Chris Grassie
- Stadium: Veterans Memorial Soccer Complex
- National Championships: 1 (2020)
- Conference Championships: 6 - (Regular season: 2000, 2019, 2020, 2023; Tournament: 2019, 2023)
- NCAA tournament Appearances: 7 (2019, 2020, 2021, 2022, 2023, 2024, 2025)
- All-Americans: 8
- Best Final Ranking: No. 1 (2020 United Soccer Coaches, Top Drawer Soccer, College Soccer News)
- First Season Played: 1979

The team plays its home games at Veterans Memorial Soccer Complex in Huntington. The Thundering Herd have made 6 straight NCAA tournament appearances 2019-2024, which includes 2 College Cup Finals appearances and a national championship in the 2020 NCAA Division I men's soccer tournament.

==== Women's soccer ====
- Head Coach: Rafa Simoes
- Stadium: Veterans Memorial Soccer Complex
- First Season Played: 1998

=== Softball ===
- Head Coach: Morgan Zerkle
- Stadium: Dot Hicks Field
- Conference Championships: 5 - (Regular season: 2003, 2005, 2017; Tournament: 1995, 2013)
- NCAA tournament Appearances: 3 (2013, 2017, 2026)
- All-Americans: 5
- Best Final Ranking: No. 24 (2017 USA Today/NFCA Coaches Poll)
- First Season Played: 1994

=== Tennis ===
- Head Coach: John Mercer
- NCAA tournament Team Appearances: 4 (2002, 2003, 2004, 2005)
- NCAA tournament Doubles Appearances: 6 (2003, 2004, 2006, 2008, 2010, 2011)
- NCAA tournament Individual Appearances: 4
- Conference Team Championships: 12 (Regular season 1971, 1976, 1977, 1997, 2000, 2003, 2004; Tournament 1997, 2002, 2003, 2004, 2005)
- All-Americans: 2
- First Season Played: 1970

=== Volleyball ===
- Head Coach: Heather Stout
- Arena: Cam Henderson Center
- Conference Championships: 6 - (Regular season: 1996, 2005, 2007 Tournament: 1988, 1995, 2005)
- NCAA tournament Appearances: 2 (1995, 2005)
- First Season Played: 1970

=== Cross Country ===
- Head Coach: Caleb Bowen
- NCAA tournament qualifiers: 3 - (Kim Nutter 1979, Matt Schiffbauer, Abby Herring 2023)

=== Track and Field ===
- Director: Keith Roberts
- Cross Country Coach: Caleb Bowen
- Facility: Jeff Small Track/Chris Cline Indoor Athletic Facility

=== Swimming and Diving ===
- Head Coach: Ian Walsh
- Diving Coach: Megan Siford
- Facility: Frederick A. Fitch Nataorium

== Traditions ==
=== Mascot ===
Initially, Marshall athletic teams used the nickname "Big Green" for much of its early history. However, Huntington sportswriter Duke Ridgley first used the phrase "Thundering Herd" in 1925 to describe the football team. The headlines of that football season, coupled with the popularity of Zane Grey's novel at the time, "The Thundering Herd", saw the nickname stick.

As early as the 1930s, buffalo mascots appearances on the sideline of Marshall sporting events. However, the mascot would remain nameless and sporadic in appearances until 1954, when the editors of the Marshall University yearbook created a buffalo character roaming through the pages and named their character "Marco", derived from the term "Marshall College" as the school was known at the time. A buffalo costume was purchased for a booster club in 1965, and Marco would return to sporting events that year. In 1970, a live buffalo was introduced as Marco the mascot and was trained to perform at halftime for football games. However, after halftime during a game against Xavier in 1971, the live buffalo refused to return to its trailer and kickoff of the second half was delayed as handlers attempted to control the buffalo. The live mascot performances were discontinued afterward.

Sun Belt Conference logo in Marshall's colors

=== School songs ===
Marshall school songs are typically performed by the Marshall University Marching Thunder at home sporting events.

==== "Sons of Marshall" ====
Marshall University's fight song is "Sons of Marshall", referring to the students of the institution, and was written by Marshall alum Ralph A. Williams in 1935.

==== Alma Mater ====
The Marshall University Alma Mater was written in 1906 by C.E. and James Haworth

== Championships ==
=== NCAA team championships ===
Marshall University has won 3 NCAA team national championships.

- Men's (3):
  - Football (I-AA) (2): 1992, 1996
  - Soccer (1): 2020 (Note: Due to COVID-19, the NCAA moved its Division I championships in fall sports, including men's soccer, from fall 2020 to spring 2021. It labeled the tournament as the "2020" edition, but the season as the "2020–21" season.)

=== Other national team championships ===
Below are national team titles in current and former NCAA sports that were not bestowed by the NCAA:

- Men's (1):
  - Basketball (1): 1947

== Facilities ==
=== Joan C. Edwards Stadium ===
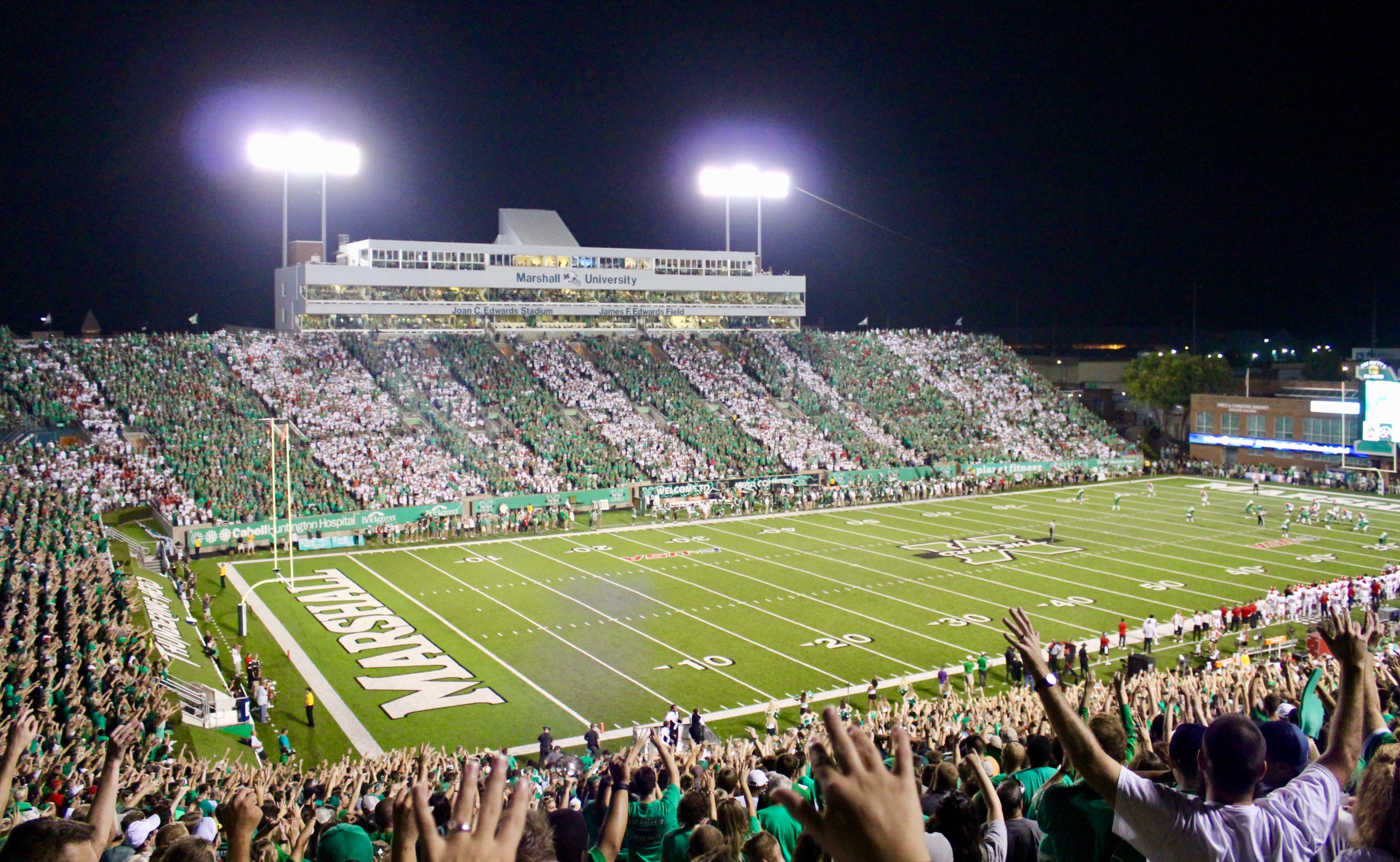
Joan C. Edwards Stadium

Marshall plays football at Joan C. Edwards Stadium, which seats 38,019. The stadium, which opened for the 1991 season as Marshall University Stadium with a then-record crowd of 33,116 for a 24–23 win over New Hampshire, hosted a record crowd of 41,382 on September 10, 2010, when the Thundering Herd played the in-state rival West Virginia Mountaineers. On a façade on the stadium's west side is a bronze memorial dedicated to the 1970 plane-crash victims.

In 2003, Marshall renamed its stadium, honoring a major donor, Joan C. Edwards to the university and its athletic program. The facility became the first football stadium in Division I-A to be named after a woman; Mrs. Edwards' husband, James F. Edwards, has his name on the actual playing field.

=== Cam Henderson Center ===
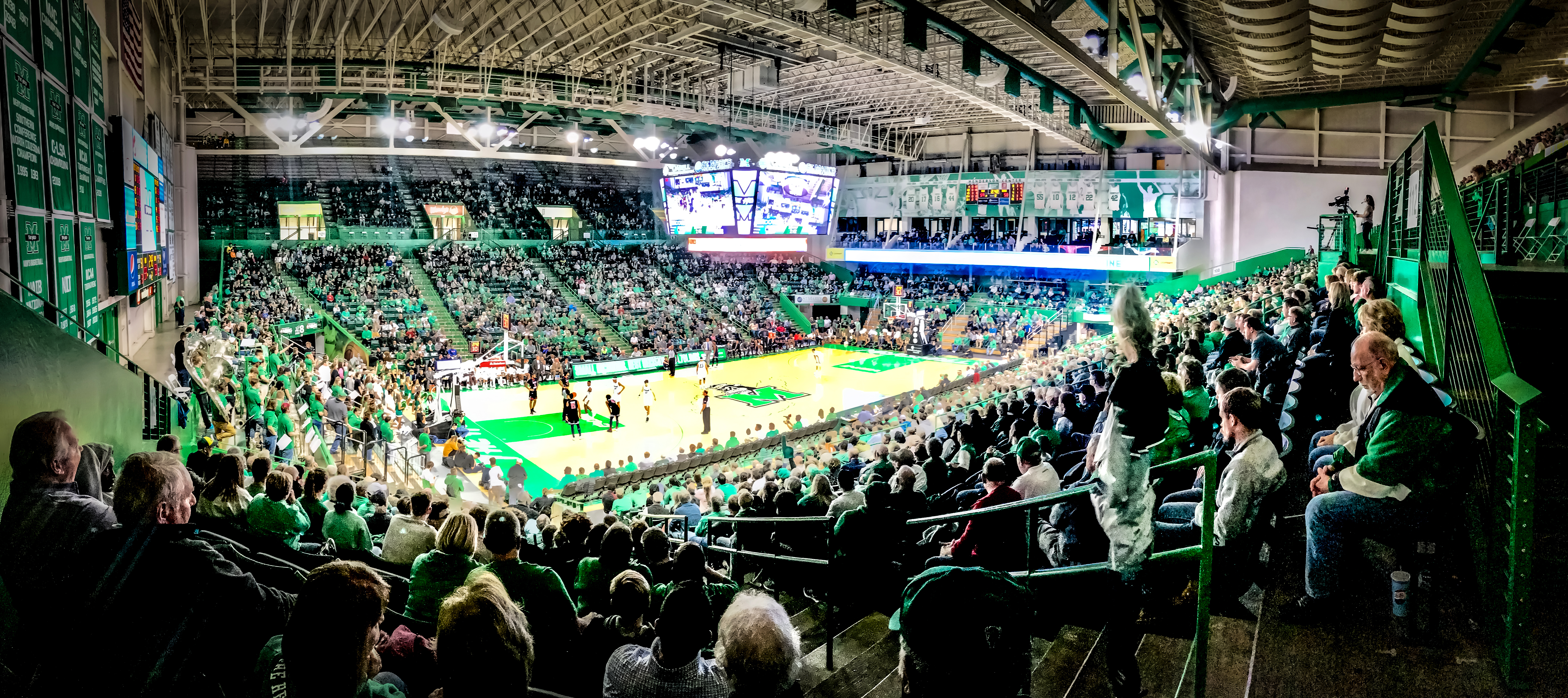
Cam Henderson Center

Men's basketball, women's basketball, and volleyball teams play their home games at the 9,048-seat Cam Henderson Center, named for the innovative Cam Henderson who guided the school's basketball team from 1935 to 1955 and football from 1935 to 1949. Henderson won 358 games against just 158 losses as a basketball coach. The facility opened in 1981 and saw a major renovation in 1998. The Henderson Center is a 213,000 square-foot facility which houses much of Marshall University's athletic department staff offices, the ticket office, an 800-seat natatorium, a state of the art training room, a basketball-specific weight room, and spacious locker rooms. The single game attendance record at the Cam Henderson Center was set on February 18, 1984, against The Citadel when 10,705 fans witnessed the 85-71 Marshall victory.

=== Veterans Memorial Soccer Complex ===
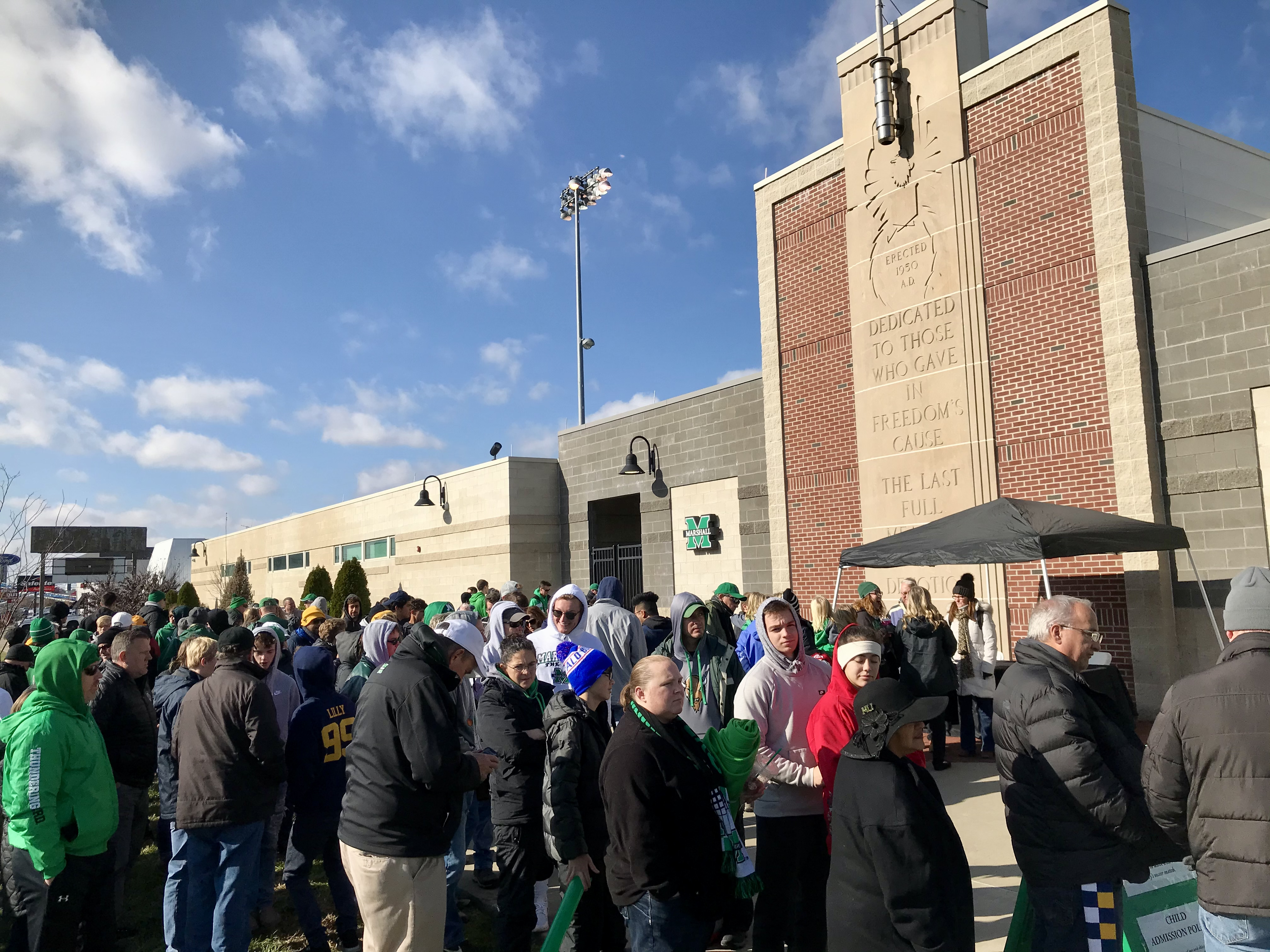
Veterans Memorial Soccer Complex

Hoops Family Field at Veterans Memorial Soccer Complex is a 1,006-capacity soccer-specific stadium and is home to the Herd's men's and women's soccer teams. It was built on the former site of the Veterans Memorial Fieldhouse, which was demolished in order to build the stadium at a cost of $8 million. An inaugural double-header took place on August 23, 2013. The men's team held a scrimmage against Marshall alumni from past years resulting in a 2–0 victory. The women's team faced the Campbell University Fighting Camels and won 3–0. The largest crowd in the stadium's history occurred on September 17, 2021, when 3,033 witnessed Marshall and West Virginia draw, 2–2.

=== Jack Cook Field ===
Jack Cook Field is a 3,500 seat baseball stadium that is home to the Marshall Thundering Herd baseball team, as well as the Appalachian League member Tri-State Coal Cats. The facility opened on March 1, 2024 when the Thundering Herd defeated Manhattan, 3-0, in front of an inaugural game crowd of 3,124. The $23 million facility is named in memory of former Marshall baseball coach Jack Cook, and the clubhouse beyond left field is named in honor of former Marshall baseball player Alex Lawrence.

=== Dot Hicks Field ===
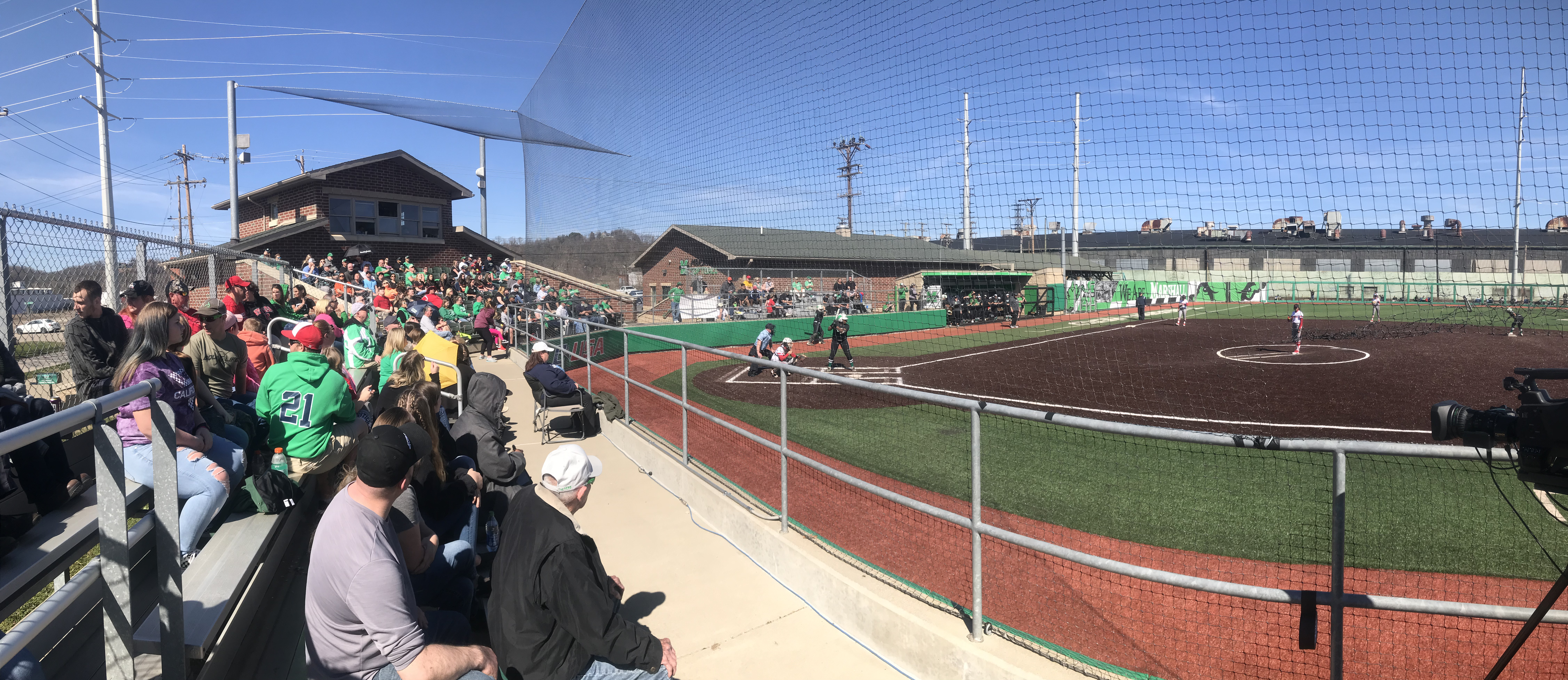
Dot Hicks Field

The Marshall softball team has played its games at Dot Hicks Field since the facility opened in 2008. The $2.5 million facility features a clubhouse, grandstands, pressbox and concession building, warmup areas, and the playing field. The field is named after Dorothy "Dot" Hicks, a pioneer of the women's sports program at Marshall University who led the school's female student-athletics from a time of intramural activities into the era of organized intercollegiate competition. At various times, she served as coach of Marshall's volleyball, badminton, women's tennis and women's golf teams.

=== Guyan Golf and Country Club ===
The Guyan Golf and Country Club has served as the home course for Marshall's golf teams since the late 1940s. The Huntington course is 6,446 yards and a par-71. It has also served as the site of numerous tournaments throughout the years including the Marshall Invitational and Lady Herd Fall Classic. The golf pro of the course is Paul Bailey, a former Marshall University golfer.

=== Chris Cline Indoor Athletic Facility ===
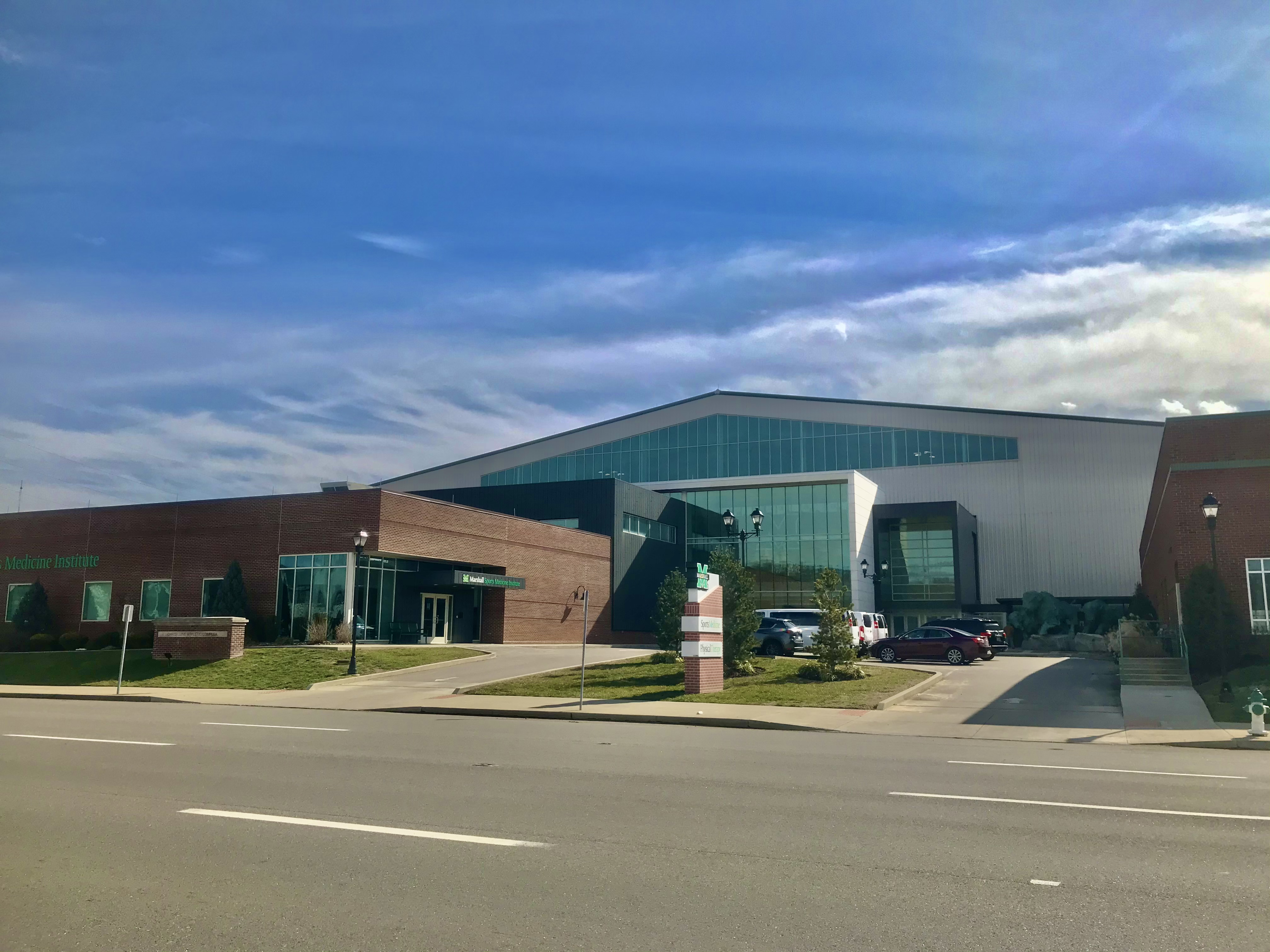
Chris Cline Athletic Complex

In 2012, Marshall University announced a multi-facility expansion project known as the Herd Vision campaign. The university accepted ownership of the Veterans Memorial Fieldhouse located five blocks from campus, which was demolished and replaced by the Veterans Memorial Soccer Complex, a soccer specific stadium that opened in August 2013. MU's former soccer facility next to Joan C. Edwards Stadium, Sam Hood Field, was replaced by the Chris Cline Indoor Athletic Facility, a $25 million project which included an indoor football practice facility, an indoor track, the Marshall University Athletic Hall of Fame, and a physical therapy research center, known as the Marshall Sports Medicine Institute, available for both student-athletes and anyone from inside or outside of MU who needs help with sports medicine or work related rehab or training. The Chris Cline Indoor Athletic Facility opened in September 2014. MU legends Chad Pennington, a former NFL quarterback with the New York Jets and Miami Dolphins, and the former head coach of the Houston Rockets of the NBA, Mike D'Antoni headed up fund raising for the effort for Marshall Director of Athletics Mike Hamrick.

=== Herd Rises ===
In October 2019, Marshall announced a $150 million fundraising initiative. The Herd Rises campaign aims to raise money for Marshall with the primary goal of building an on-campus baseball stadium at the site of the old Flint Group Pigments industrial property on 5th Avenue. Other goals of the campaign include improvements to Gullickson Hall, erecting a statue of legendary Marshall basketball player Hal Greer outside of the Cam Henderson Center, and additional funds towards student-athlete scholarships.

== See also ==
- List of college athletic programs in West Virginia
