= Dan Rose (footballer, born 2003) =

Footballer (born 2003)

Personal information
- Full name: Daniel Rose
- Date of birth: 11 December 2003 (age 22)
- Place of birth: Wilmslow, England
- Height: 1.93 m (6 ft 4 in)
- Position: Goalkeeper

Team information
- Current team: Liberty Flames

Youth career
- 2012–2016: Manchester City
- 2016–2020: Everton
- 2020–2022: Schalke 04

College career
Years	Team	Apps	(Gls)
2023–2025	Marshall Thundering Herd	15	(0)
2026	Kentucky Wildcats	0	(0)
2026–	Liberty Flames	11	(0)

International career^{‡}
2018	Republic of Ireland U15	2	(0)
2018–2019	Republic of Ireland U16	5	(0)
2019–2020	Republic of Ireland U17	5	(0)
2021–2022	Republic of Ireland U19	4	(0)
2021	Republic of Ireland U21	1	(0)
- ‡ National team caps and goals as of 10:38, 28 September 2022 (UTC)

Daniel Rose (born 11 December 2003) is a professional footballer who plays as a goalkeeper for the Marshall Thundering Herd college team. Born in England, he has represented the Republic of Ireland at youth international level.

== Club career ==
Born in Wilmslow, Rose started his career with childhood club Manchester City, before being released at a young age. He would go on to spend the next four seasons with Everton.

Linked with German side Schalke 04 for six months, Rose's move to Gelsenkirchen seemed to be in jeopardy due to the COVID-19 pandemic in Germany. However, after sending a text in German to Schalke's transfer negotiator, the deal was resurrected, and Rose completed the move in June 2020. As Rose had turned down the offer of a scholarship with Everton, the Merseyside club were due compensation from the deal.

On 17 December 2022, it was announced that Rose joined the Marshall Thundering Herd college team.

== International career ==
Rose is eligible to represent both England and the Republic of Ireland, as his mother is Irish. He has expressed his desire to play for the Republic of Ireland.
