= Marching Thunder =

Marching band of Marshall University

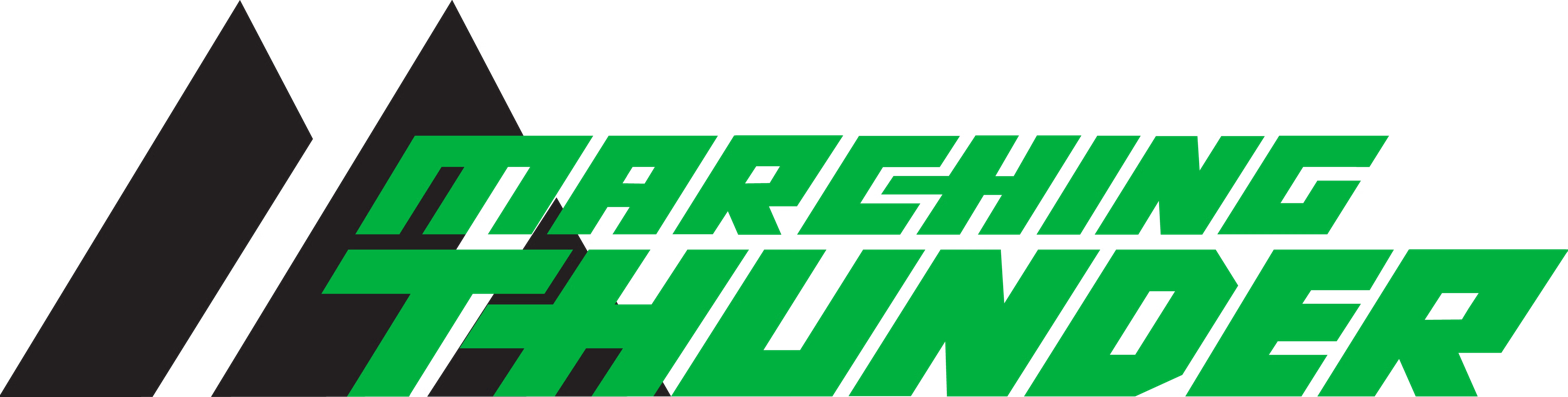
- School: Marshall University
- Location: Huntington, West Virginia
- Conference: Sun Belt
- Founded: 1925
- Director: Dr. Christopher Schletter

Uniform
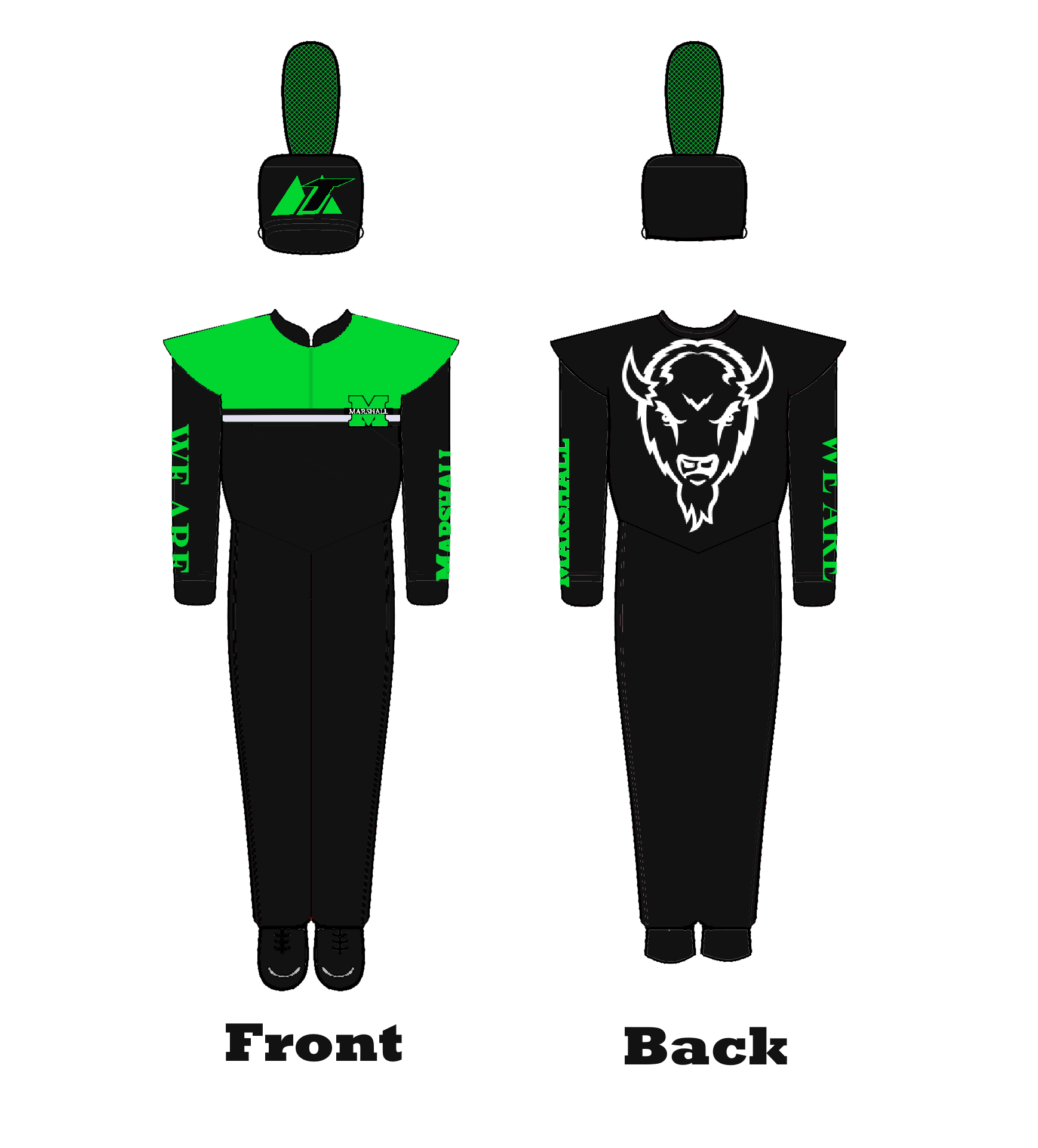
- Website: https://www.marshall.edu/band/

"The Marching Thunder" is the marching band of Marshall University in Huntington, West Virginia. The Marshall University Marching Thunder is the largest and most visible student organization on campus. As the largest student organization on campus, the 130 piece marching band provides entertainment and school spirit at football games, basketball games, and other community functions.

== History ==
The first band at Marshall University was organized in 1902 and consisted of twenty members. G.B. Able, a part-time music teacher was the director. However, it was not until 1925 that the band became a permanent ensemble. The organize was John O. Muldoon, head of the Department of Rural Education. The band came under the direction of music faculty member, Harry E. Mueller in 1928. Mueller continued as director until 1946, when Earl Workman, a 1939 graduate of Marshall, was appointed director. He was replaced by Thomas O'Connell in 1948, who held the position until 1964.

=== The band during World War II ===
The band was an all-male organization until 1948, when women were admitted to the concert band. In 1951, enrollment in band every semester became mandatory for instrumental music majors, and women were admitted to participate in the marching band. Since then the bands have been coeducational.

After 1950, the marching band has performed at football games with universities in the Mid-American Conference: Miami, Ohio, Bowling Green, Kent, and Toledo. Directors since 1964 have been Howard Bell (1964-1967) and Dr. Robert R. Clark (1967-1976).

In 1976, the marching band was scheduled to perform with the West Virginia University Marching Band "The Pride of West Virginia" at the Inauguration of Governor John D. Rockefeller, but -10º weather on the day of the inauguration forced the cancellation of the performance on the capital steps.

In 1983, the National Association of Uniform Manufacturers presented the Big Green Marching Machine with an award as "The Best Dressed Band in the South."

=== Big Green Marching Machine ===
On September 10, 1977 at the Ohio University game, a new name was given to the Marshall University Marching Band as the band opened its show with the theme from "Rocky". The P.A. announcer began...

"Ladies and gentlemen - May I have your attention please - In the southeast corner of the stadium, wearing green trunks and white cross belts, and weighing in at 18,277.5 pounds, the Marshall University 'Big Green Marching Machine!'"

Thus began a new tradition at MU.

=== Marching Thunder ===
Dr. Baruch Whitehead renamed the band in 1993 to the "Marching Hundred." Mistakenly announced as the "Marching Thunder" during the first game, the name stuck and still holds its title to this day. "Marching Thunder" clearly references the nickname for Marshall's athletic teams, "Thundering Herd."

== "Sons of Marshall" Fight Song ==
"Sons of Marshall" does not refer to the offspring of the long time Chief Justice of the United States John Marshall (1755-1835). Instead it refers to the students of Marshall University in Huntington, West Virginia. One of our own, Ralph A. Williams, attended the then Marshall College in 1907 and wrote "Sons of Marshall" in 1935 in honor of the college and his daughter Dorothy Grace Williams. The composition is now the official fight song of the "Thundering Herd."

=== Lyrics ===
The lyrics constitute the alma mater of Marshall University. The text expresses institutional identity and history, referencing the university's namesake, Chief Justice John Marshall. The lyrics describe a student life as a combination of athletic support and academic pursuit, while also emphasizing the school colors of green and white.

== Directors ==
- Dr. Christopher Schletter (2020–present)
- Dr. Adam Dalton (2014–2020)
- Mr. Steve Barnett (2003-2014)
- Tommy Thompson (2002-2003)
- Dr. Baruch Judge Whitehead (1993-2002)
- Mr. Ivory Brock (1992-1993)
- Dr. Richard Lemke (1976-1992)
- Kenneth W. Large (1974-1976)
- Dr. Robert R. Clark (1967-1974)
- Howard Bell (1964-1967)
- Thomas O'Connell (1948-1964)
- Earl Workman (1946-1948)
- Harry E. Mueller (1928-1946)
- John O. Muldoon (1925-1928)

== Tri-State Marching Championships ==
The Tri-State Marching Championships, as it is now called, started in 1970 and brings thousands of marching band students on campus as a marching competition. Students have the opportunity to perform in the Joan C. Edwards Stadium at Marshall University. Since its inception, the contest has welcomed an average of 20 bands each and every year.

== Notable Performance ==
1997 - Bands of America Grand Nationals in the RCA Dome (Indianapolis, IN)

2018 - Rome New Year's Day Parade in Rome, Italy

2020 - London New Year's Day Parade in London, England
