= Paulo Pita =

Brazilian footballer

Personal information
- Date of birth: June 3, 1994 (age 32)
- Place of birth: Santos, São Paulo, Brazil
- Height: 6 ft 3 in (1.91 m)
- Position: Goalkeeper

College career
Years	Team	Apps	(Gls)
2016–2017	Charleston Golden Eagles	33	(0)
2018–2019	Marshall Thundering Herd	39	(0)

Senior career*
Years	Team	Apps	(Gls)
2016	The Villages SC	13	(0)
2017	Chattanooga FC	9	(0)
2018	The Villages SC	7	(0)
2019	FC Wichita	2	(0)
2020	North Carolina FC	1	(0)

Managerial career
- Sporting Kansas City Academy (U12 goalkeeping coach)
- * Club domestic league appearances and goals

Paulo Pita (born June 3, 1994) is a former Brazilian soccer player and current coach. He formerly played as a goalkeeper at the collegiate level for the Charleston Golden Eagles and the Marshall Thundering Herd.

== Career ==
=== College & Senior ===
Pita played college soccer at University of Charleston in 2016 and 2017. In his sophomore season, he posted a 20-1-2 record en route to leading the Golden Eagles to the NCAA Division II men's soccer national championship. In the title game, he posted a shutout and was named Most Outstanding Player.

He transferred to Marshall University, where he played in 2018 and 2019.

Concurrent with his college career, Pita played the 2016 and 2018 seasons with The Villages SC of the Premier Development League, appearing in 20 games, along with a handful of other appearances. During the 2017 season, Pita played for Chattanooga FC in the National Premier Soccer League. Pita started out the season as the team's back-up keeper but eventually won the starting position; making 9 league appearances. In 2019, Pita played for FC Wichita of the National Premier Soccer League.

In 2020, Pita was selected 24th overall in the first round of the MLS SuperDraft by Los Angeles FC but did not sign with the club. He subsequently joined North Carolina FC, where he made one appearance before retiring from professional soccer.

Following his playing career, Pita worked as a goalkeeping coach within the Sporting Kansas City Academy, including roles at the youth level. In addition to his previous academy involvement, he operates an independent goalkeeping training program.

Outside of soccer, Pita works in automotive sales in the Kansas City area.
