= Marshall Thundering Herd men's soccer =

Multi-college American soccer team

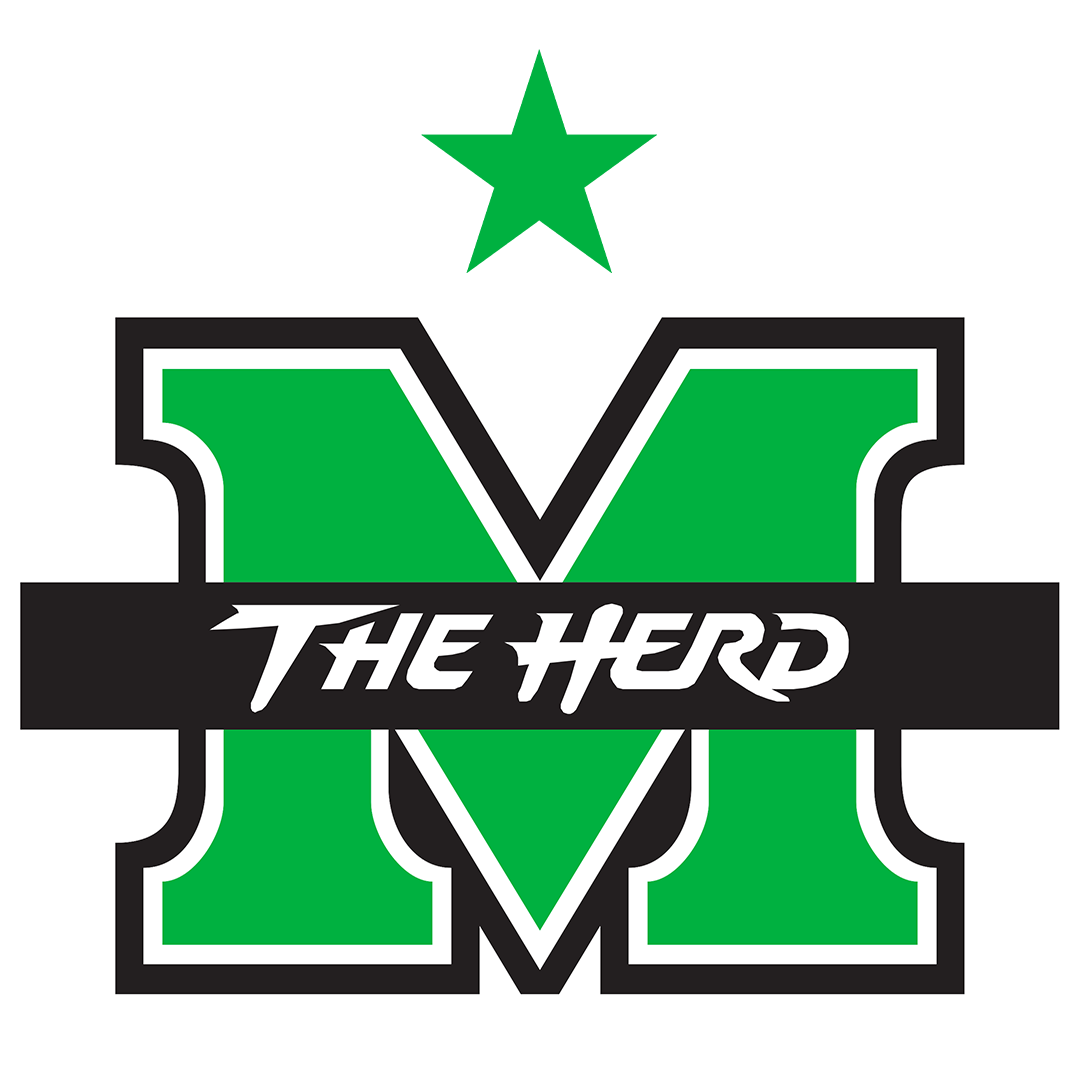
- Founded: 1979; 47 years ago
- University: Marshall University
- Head coach: Chris Grassie (10th season)
- Conference: Sun Belt; Division I Division
- Location: Huntington, West Virginia, US
- Stadium: Veterans Memorial Soccer Complex (capacity: 1,256)
- Nickname: Thundering Herd
- Colors: Kelly green and white
| Home | Away |

NCAA tournament championships
- 2020

NCAA tournament runner-up
- 2024

NCAA tournament College Cup
- 2020, 2024

NCAA tournament Quarterfinals
- 2020, 2024

NCAA tournament Round of 16
- 2019, 2020, 2022, 2023, 2024, 2026

NCAA tournament Round of 32
- 2019, 2020, 2021, 2022, 2023, 2024, 2025, 2026

NCAA tournament appearances
- 2019, 2020, 2021, 2022, 2023, 2024, 2025, 2026

Conference tournament championships
- 2019, 2023

Conference regular season championships
- 2000, 2019, 2020, 2023, 2026

The Marshall Thundering Herd men's soccer team is a varsity intercollegiate athletic team of Marshall University in Huntington, West Virginia. The Thundering Herd plays its home games at Veterans Memorial Soccer Complex in Huntington and competes in the National Collegiate Athletic Association Division I Sun Belt Conference (SBC). Marshall fielded its first intercollegiate men's soccer team in 1979. The Herd are coached by Chris Grassie, who has a record of 100–37–25 and a national championship during his eight previous seasons at Marshall.

== Seasons ==
Record table
| Season | Coach | Overall | Conference | Standing | Postseason |
|---|---|---|---|---|---|
Southern Conference (1979–1996)
| 1979 | Ed Saad | 1–11–1 | 1–5–1 | 7th | |
| 1980 | Ed Saad | 3–14–0 | 0–8–0 | 9th | |
| 1981 | Sam Hood | 6–8–2 | 2–4–2 | 7th | |
| 1982 | Jack Defazio | 13–6–0 | 5–2–0 | 2nd | |
| 1983 | Jack Defazio | 10–10–0 | 4–2–0 | 2nd (North) | |
| 1984 | Jack Defazio | 12–5–0 | 2–4–0 | 3rd (North) | |
| 1985 | Jack Defazio | 10–7–1 | 3–3–0 | 3rd (North) | |
| 1986 | Jack Defazio | 5–11–2 | 1–4–0 | 5th | |
| 1987 | Jack Defazio | 4–14–0 | 0–5–0 | 6th | |
| 1988 | Jack Defazio | 1–13–1 | 0–4–0 | 5th | SoCon First Round |
| 1989 | John Gibson | 7–10–3 | 1–2–1 | 3rd | SoCon Semifinals |
| 1990 | John Gibson | 9–10–2 | 1–1–2 | 3rd | SoCon Semifinals |
| 1991 | John Gibson | 9–9–4 | 2–2–0 | 3rd | SoCon Runners-up |
| 1992 | John Gibson | 3–13–2 | 0–4–2 | 7th | SoCon First Round |
| 1993 | John Gibson | 5–15–1 | 2–3–1 | 5th | SoCon Semifinals |
| 1994 | Scott Fischer | 4–14–2 | 1–4–1 | 7th | SoCon First Round |
| 1995 | Bob Gray | 10–10–0 | 3–3–0 | 4th | SoCon Semifinals |
| 1996 | Bob Gray | 11–7–2 | 4–1–1 | 2nd | SoCon Semifinals |
| SoCon Total: | | 123–187–23 | 31–61–11 | | |
Mid-American Conference (1997–2004)
| 1997 | Bob Gray | 9–10–3 | 4–2–1 | 4th | MAC Quarterfinals |
| 1998 | Bob Gray | 11–9–1 | 4–4–0 | 5th | MAC Quarterfinals |
| 1999 | Bob Gray | 9–11–1 | 3–3–1 | 4th | MAC Semifinals |
| 2000 | Bob Gray | 14–5–1 | 4–2–0 | T–1st | MAC Semifinals |
| 2001 | Bob Gray | 12–7–0 | 3–3–0 | 3rd | MAC Semifinals |
| 2002 | Bob Gray | 7–9–2 | 3–2–0 | 4th | MAC Semifinals |
| 2003 | Bob Gray | 6–13–0 | 2–4–0 | T–5th | MAC Quarterfinals |
| 2004 | Bob Gray | 10–7–3 | 3–2–1 | T–4th | MAC Quarterfinals |
| MAC Total: | | 78–71–11 | 26–22–3 | | |
Conference USA (2005–2021)
| 2005 | Bob Gray | 8–9–2 | 4–3–2 | 5th | C-USA Semifinals |
| 2006 | Bob Gray | 4–10–2 | 1–6–1 | 9th | |
| 2007 | Bob Gray | 10–9–1 | 3–5–0 | 6th | C-USA Semifinals |
| 2008 | Bob Gray | 3–14–1 | 3–5–0 | 7th | C-USA Quarterfinals |
| 2009 | Bob Gray | 10–7–2 | 6–2–0 | 2nd | C-USA Runners-up |
| 2010 | Bob Gray | 9–5–4 | 3–4–1 | 7th | |
| 2011 | Bob Gray | 8–8–1 | 4–3–1 | 5th | C-USA Quarterfinals |
| 2012 | Bob Gray | 11–5–1 | 3–5–0 | 7th | |
| 2013 | Bob Gray | 2–11–6 | 0–6–3 | 10th | |
| 2014 | Bob Gray | 7–9–3 | 3–4–1 | 6th | C-USA Quarterfinals |
| 2015 | Bob Gray | 8–9–2 | 2–5–1 | 7th | C-USA Runners-up |
| 2016 | Bob Gray | 6–11–1 | 1–6–1 | 9th | |
| 2017 | Chris Grassie | 8–10–2 | 3–5–0 | 6th | |
| 2018 | Chris Grassie | 8–9–3 | 3–3–2 | 5th | C-USA Semifinals |
| 2019 | Chris Grassie | 16–3–3 | 5–1–1 | 1st | C-USA Champions; NCAA Third Round |
| 2020 | Chris Grassie | 13–2–3 | 6–0–1 | 1st | NCAA Champions |
| 2021 | Chris Grassie | 11–4–3 | 5–1–2 | 2nd | C-USA Semifinals; NCAA Second Round |
| C-USA Total: | | 142–135–40 | 55–64–17 | | |
Sun Belt Conference (2022–present)
| 2022 | Chris Grassie | 11–4–4 | 4–1–3 | 2nd | SBC Quarterfinals; NCAA Third Round |
| 2023 | Chris Grassie | 18–3–0 | 7–2–0 | 1st | Sun Belt Champions; NCAA Third Round |
| 2024 | Chris Grassie | 15–2–7 | 4–0–5 | 2nd | Sun Belt Runner-up; NCAA Runner-Up |
| 2025 | Chris Grassie | 12–4–5 | 6–2–1 | 3rd | Sun Belt Runner-up; NCAA Second Round |
| SBC Total: | | 56–13–16 | 21–5–9 | | |
| Total: | | 398–406–90 | | | |
National champion Postseason invitational champion Conference regular season champion Conference regular season and conference tournament champion Division regular season champion Division regular season and conference tournament champion Conference tournament champion

=== 2020 season ===
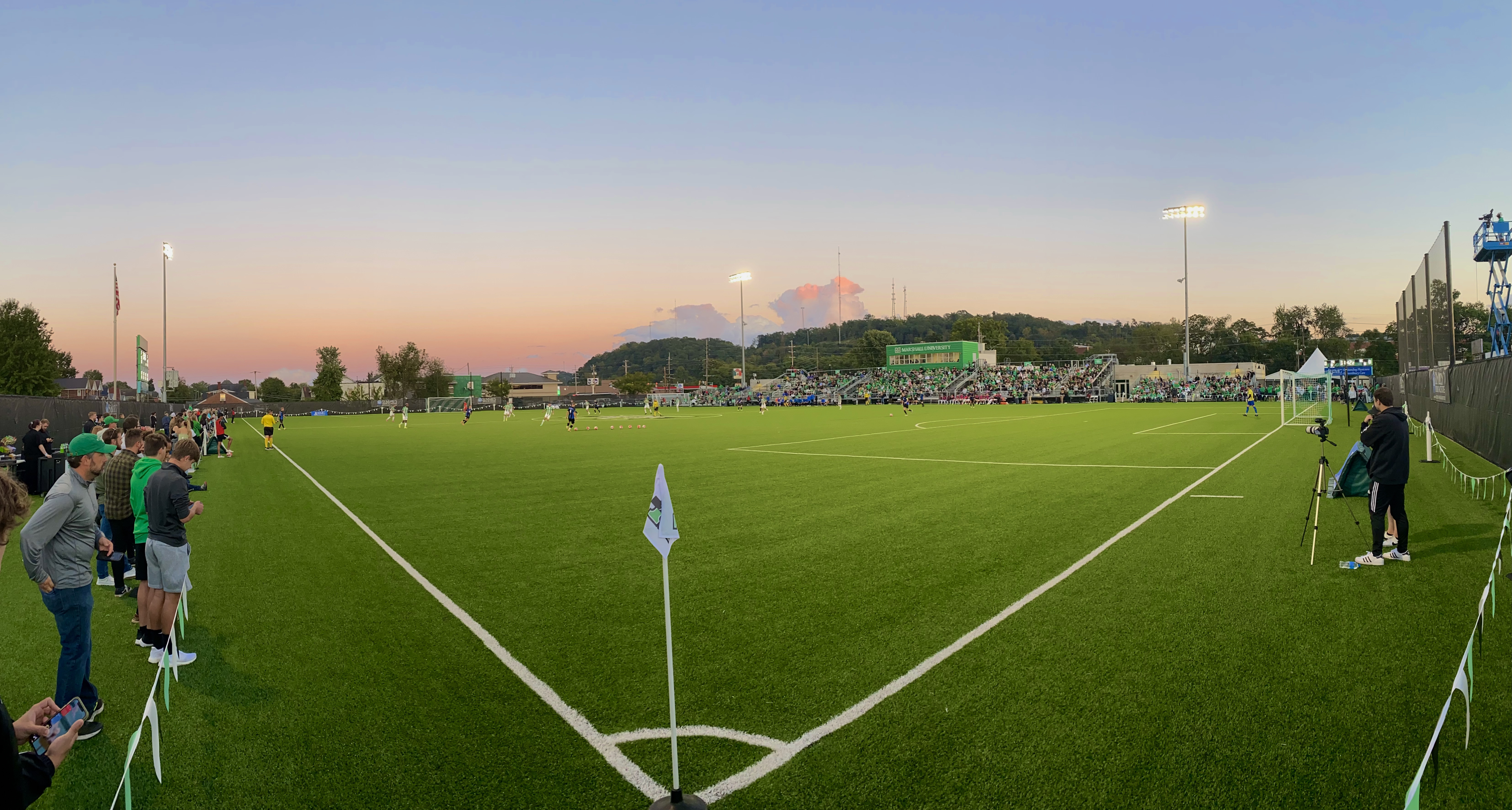
Marshall Thundering Herd men's soccer plays its home games at Veterans Memorial Soccer Complex

In 2020, the Marshall Men's soccer team, coached by Chris Grassie, broke several records and made a historic run in the 2020 NCAA Division I Men's Soccer Tournament. After winning the Conference USA Regular Season championship, they received an automatic bid to the 2020 NCAA Men's Soccer Tournament. The team was unseeded going into the tournament; however, they beat #23 ranked Fordham University in the second round, upset #1 seed Clemson in the third round, beat defending national champions and #8 seed Georgetown in the quarterfinals, and beat North Carolina in the College Cup semifinals. The season was capped off with a OT golden goal win over #3 seed Indiana in the College Cup final, giving Marshall its first-ever NCAA Division I National Championship in men's soccer. It was also Conference USA's first-ever national championship in any team sport.

== Players ==
=== Current roster ===
As of 9 Sep 2024

Note: Flags indicate national team as defined under FIFA eligibility rules; some limited exceptions apply. Players may hold more than one non-FIFA nationality.

| No. | Pos. | Nation | Player |
|---|---|---|---|
| 1 | GK | IRL | Dan Rose |
| 2 | DF | USA | Rohin Kapila |
| 3 | MF | BRA | Thiago Apolinario |
| 4 | DF | ENG | Alex Bamford |
| 5 | MF | USA | Ryan Holmes |
| 6 | DF | USA | Aleksandar Vukovic |
| 7 | FW | BRA | Lineker Rodrigues |
| 8 | MF | JPN | Taimu Okiyoshi |
| 9 | FW | GER | Tarik Pannholzer |
| 10 | MF | MAR | Aymane Sordo |
| 11 | MF | ESP | Pablo Simon |
| 12 | FW | BRA | Joao Roberto |
| 13 | DF | USA | Ethan Prescott |
| 15 | DF | JPN | Takahiro Fujita |

| No. | Pos. | Nation | Player |
|---|---|---|---|
| 16 | MF | BRA | Felipe Santos |
| 17 | FW | CAN | Loïc Sany Kong |
| 18 | FW | USA | Haruhi Taneda |
| 20 | MF | DEN | Alexander Stjernegaard |
| 21 | DF | FRA | Théo Godard |
| 22 | FW | JAM | Adrian Mahoney |
| 25 | DF | FRA | Max Manéké |
| 31 | DF | POR | Rai Pinto |
| 32 | FW | JPN | Masaya Sekiguchi |
| 33 | GK | SRB | Aleksa Janjic |
| 36 | GK | USA | Eddie DeMarco |
| 43 | DF | BRA | Braian Amaro |
| 47 | DF | USA | Marco Silva |
| 99 | GK | JPN | Eijin Magota |

== Rivalries ==
=== Mountain State derby ===
Marshall's biggest rivals are West Virginia, as the two sides are the only Division 1 men's soccer teams in the state. Both teams are members of the Sun Belt Conference for men's soccer, and matches between the two teams typically draw large crowds.

=== Record against Sun Belt opponents ===
| Opponent | Series record (WLT) |
|---|---|
| Coastal Carolina | 3–1–3 |
| Georgia Southern | 5–4–2 |
| Georgia State | 4–0–2 |
| James Madison | 7–4–1 |
| Kentucky | 22–22–6 |
| Old Dominion | 9–6–2 |
| South Carolina | 16–5–1 |
| UCF | 6–9–1 |
| West Virginia | 9–18–5 |

Records as of 10/28/26

== Individual achievements ==
=== All-Americans ===
- Lineker Rodrigues dos Santos - 2024 United Soccer Coaches First Team
- Matthew Bell - 2023 Consensus All-American First Team
- Morris Duggan - 2023 United Soccer Coaches First Team
- Taimu Okiyoshi - 2023 United Soccer Coaches Third Team, 2024 United Soccer Coaches Second Team
- Pedro Dolabella - 2021 United Soccer Coaches Second Team
- Vitor Dias - 2020 Consensus All-American First Team, 2021 United Soccer Coaches Third Team
- Nathan Dossantos - 2020 Top Drawer Soccer Third Team
- Milo Yosef - 2019 United Soccer Coaches Second Team, 2019 Soccer America Second Team, 2022 United Soccer Coaches Second Team

=== Conference Players of the Year ===
| Year | Player | Conference |
|---|---|---|
| 2023 | Matthew Bell | Sun Belt |
| 2022 | Milo Yosef | Sun Belt |
| 2021 | Pedro Dolabella | C-USA |
| 2020 | Vitor Dias | C-USA |
| 2012 | Daniel Withrow | C-USA |
| 2002 | Byron Carmichael | MAC |
| 2000 | Byron Carmichael | MAC |

=== Conference Coach of the Year ===
| Year | Coach | Conference |
|---|---|---|
| 2020 | Chris Grassie | C-USA |
| 2019 | Chris Grassie | C-USA |
| 2009 | Bob Gray | C-USA |
| 2005 | Bob Gray | C-USA |
| 2000 | Bob Gray | MAC |
| 1990 | Dr John Gibson | Southern Conference |
| 1982 | Jack DeFazio | Southern Conference |

=== Career goalscorers ===
Bryon Carmichael leads Marshall's goalscoring record, scoring 58 career goals.

| Rank | Player | Years | Goals |
|---|---|---|---|
| 1 | Byron Carmichael | 1999–2002 | 58 |
| 2 | Andy Zulauf | 1981–85 | 39 |
| 3 | Greg Ogle | 1982–1985 | 28 |
| 3 | Scott Laskowitz | 1983–1986 | 28 |
| 5 | Milo Yosef | 2019–22 | 27 |
| 6 | Tom Jackson | 2009-12 | 26 |
| 7 | Pedro Dolabella | 2017–21 | 23 |
| 8 | Matthew Bell | 2022-23 | 20 |
| 9 | Jamil Roberts | 2017–20 | 19 |
| 10 | Ryan LaPointe | 1989-1993 | 18 |
| 10 | David Vollmer | 1988-1991 | 18 |

== Former Herd players in the professional ranks ==
MLS SuperDraft Selections
| Year | Player | Selection | Round | MLS Team |
|---|---|---|---|---|
| 2025 | Lineker Rodrigues Dos Santos | 29th | 1st Round | Real Salt Lake |
| 2025 | Takahiro Fujita | 87th | 3rd Round | Orlando City |
| 2025 | Aleksander Vukovic | 89th | 3rd Round | Real Salt Lake |
| 2024 | Morris Duggan | 67th | 3rd Round | Minnesota United |
| 2024 | Matthew Bell | 16th | 1st Round | Real Salt Lake |
| 2023 | Oliver Semmle | 41st | 2nd Round | Colorado Rapids |
| 2022 | Nathan Dossantos | 46th | 2nd Round | Orlando City |
| 2022 | Vitor Dias | 86th | 3rd Round | Vancouver Whitecaps |
| 2021 | Jamil Roberts | 77th | 3rd Round | Sporting KC |
| 2020 | Paulo Pita | 24th | 1st Round | Los Angeles FC |
| 2013 | Daniel Withrow | 66th | 4th Round | Columbus Crew |
| 2006 | Jeremy Ashe | 46th | 4th Round | Chicago Fire |
| 2003 | Byron Carmichael | 60th | 6th Round | Kansas City Wizards |

Active Professional Players
| Player | Current team | Current league | Former team |
|---|---|---|---|
| Gabriel Alves | Tormenta FC | USL League One | Birmingham Legion FC, Rhode Island FC |
| Adam Aoumaich | Union Omaha | USL League One | n/a |
| Matthew Bell | Real Salt Lake | Major League Soccer | n/a |
| Vitor Dias | HFX Wanderers FC | Canadian Premier League | St. Louis City SC 2, Sporting Kansas City II |
| Pedro Dolabella | North Carolina FC | USL Championship | Rochester New York FC, Union Omaha |
| Nathan Dossantos | Charleston Battery | USL Championship | Pittsburgh Riverhounds |
| Morris Duggan | Minnesota United | Major League Soccer | n/a |
| Álvaro García Pascual | Sevilla FC | La Liga | n/a |
| Collin Mocyunas | Tormenta FC | USL League One | n/a |
| Taimu Okiyoshi | Rhode Island FC | USL Championship | n/a |
| Illal Osumanu | Pittsburgh Riverhounds | USL Championship | Union Omaha |
| Jamil Roberts | Truro City FC | National League South | Peninsula Power FC, Tormenta FC, Sporting Kansas City II, Chattanooga Red Wolves |
| Lineker Rodrigues dos Santos | Real Salt Lake | Major League Soccer | n/a |
| Max Schneider | Indy Eleven | USL Championship | St. Louis City SC, St. Louis City SC 2 |
| Oliver Semmle | Philadelphia Union | Major League Soccer | Louisville City FC |
| Milo Yosef | Lexington SC | USL League One | FC Tulsa |

Retired Professional Players and Other Notable Alumni
| Player | Former teams |
|---|---|
| Jeremy Ashe | Chicago Fire |
| Travis Brent | Heracles Almelo, Almere City FC, Harrisburg City Islanders |
| Phillip Buffington | Mississippi Brilla, Harrisburg City Islanders |
| Byron Carmichael | Wilmington Hammerheads, Ocean City Nor'easters |
| Sterling Flunder | Pittsburgh Riverhounds SC |
| Bijan Gloston | Guam national football team |
| Taly Goode | Kansas City Wizards |
| Kolby LaCrone | Cleveland City Stars, Pittsburgh Riverhounds SC, Louisville Lightning, Dayton Dutch Lions |
| Jan-Erik Leinhos | Louisville City, One Knoxville SC |
| Paulo Pita | North Carolina FC |
| Eddy Prugh | Bodens BK, Colorado Springs Switchbacks FC, Skellefteå FF |
| Avneet Shergill | Salgaocar F.C. |
| John Daniele | Royal Racing FC Montengee, UC La Estrella, CD Diter Zafra |
| Daniel Withrow | Columbus Crew, MLS Pool Goalkeeper, Portland Timbers, Portland Timbers 2 |
| Anthony Virgara | Pittsburgh Riverhounds SC |

== See also ==
- Marshall Thundering Herd women's soccer
