= Steven Cabas =

American soccer player

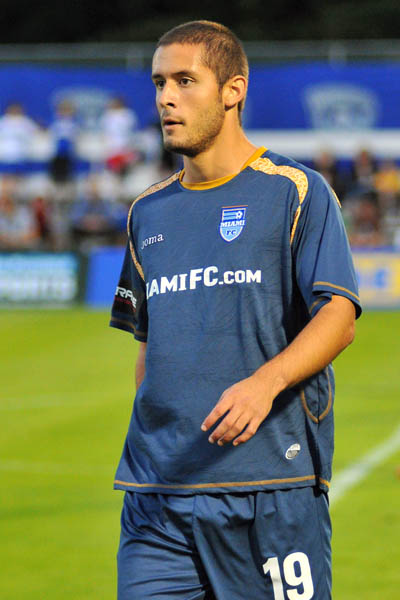

Personal information
- Full name: Steven Jair Cabas
- Date of birth: August 2, 1989 (age 37)
- Place of birth: Miami, Florida, United States
- Height: 6 ft 1 in (1.85 m)
- Position: Forward

Youth career
- 2007–2009: FIU Golden Panthers

Senior career*
Years	Team	Apps	(Gls)
2010	Miami FC	15	(0)

International career
2007	United States U-20	2	(1)
- * Club domestic league appearances and goals as of September 22, 2010

Steven Cabas (born August 2, 1989, in Miami, Florida) is an American soccer player who played for Miami FC in the USSF Division 2 Professional League.

== Career ==
=== Youth and college ===
Cabas attended Miami Coral Park High School, where he was a first-team all-county performer, was named Rookie of the Year as a high school freshman, Most Consistent as a sophomore and second-team All-Dade County as a junior. He played club soccer for the Kendall Soccer Coalition from 1998 to 2007, was a member of his region's Olympic Development Team for four years, and was part of several championship teams, winning the 2004 Lake Garda Cup in Italy and the 2005 Mexicana Cup.

He played three years of college soccer for Florida International University, where he was a Conference USA All-Tournament selection as a sophomore in 2008.

=== Professional ===
Cabas left college one season early, and turned professional in 2010 when he signed with Miami FC of the USSF Division 2 Professional League. He made his professional debut on April 10, 2010, in a game against the Rochester Rhinos.

=== International ===
Cabas was a member of the United States U-20 men's national soccer team in 2007.
