= Avneet Shergill =

American soccer player (born 1985)

Personal information
- Full name: Avneet Singh Shergill
- Date of birth: December 3, 1985 (age 40)
- Place of birth: Stockton, California, United States
- Height: 6 ft 1 in (1.85 m)
- Position: Forward

Youth career
- 2002–2004: Westside Metros
- 2004–2006: Tyler Junior College
- 2006–2008: Marshall Thundering Herd

Senior career*
Years	Team	Apps	(Gls)
2006	Ajax Orlando Prospects	8	(3)
2008	West Virginia Chaos	12	(2)
2009	Portland Timbers U23s	15	(1)
2009–2010	Salgaocar SC	3	(1)

Managerial career
- 2013–2014: R. A. Long High School (head coach)
- * Club domestic league appearances and goals

Avneet Singh Shergill (born December 3, 1985) is an American former soccer player who played as forward for Ajax Orlando Prospects, West Virginia Chaos and the Portland Timbers U23s in the USL Premier Development League and for Indian I-League club Salgaocar SC.

== Career ==
Shergill was born in Stockton, California, in the United States, to immigrant parents from India. His mother Navjot Shergill was a Track and field athlete for Khalsa College in Punjab, India. He joined Tyler Junior College from the Westside Metros SC in 2004, where he finished the season with 2005 NSCAA Junior College All-West Region Team honours, scoring nine goals. In 2006, he joined the Marshall Thundering Herd after a season competing with the Ajax Orlando Prospects from the USL Premier Development League. He scored 3 goals in 8 appearances for the Prospects, the American farm team of Dutch club Ajax Amsterdam.

After an un-successful Junior season at Marshall, Shergill led the Thundering Herd with his attacking prowess from the flanks, tallying goals against the likes of nationally ranked teams Tulsa, South Carolina, and Kentucky. His college career ended, one game shy of a Conference-USA Championship, and an NCAA Tournament bid. Following his career with Marshall, he returned to the USL Premier Development League playing for West Virginia Chaos in the 2008 season, scoring three times in twelve appearances. In 2009, he joined the Portland Timbers U23s scoring twice in 15 appearances. In 2009, Shergill transferred to Salgaocar SC, competing in the I-League in India. He became the first Indian American to compete in the newly formed league, where he was later joined by the leading scorer of the Timbers 1st team Mandjou Keita. He scored his first I-League goal for Salgaocar SC on 22 January 2010 in an away match against Air India FC at the famous Cooperage Ground in the city of Mumbai, which ended in a 2–1 loss. A severe tear in his groin cut his I-League appearances short and returned to his homeland for rehabilitation upon completion of his contract. Later competed for Red Army FC in the Greater Portland Soccer District as well as BC Tigers of the Vancouver Metro Soccer League in British Columbia, Canada before retiring from football as a player.

In 2016, as a member of the University of the Pacific Men's Soccer coaching staff, he was part of an NCAA record for single season win percentage from year to year. Pacific ended the season with a loss against Stanford in the NCAA Division-I National Tournament 2nd Round, after revival of the men's soccer program only 3 years prior. Following the season, the Pacific Men's Soccer coaching staff were recognized as the 2016 Far-West Region Coaching Staff of the Year. In 2017, he helped Southern Oregon University Men's Soccer team win both the Cascade Collegiate Conference regular season and conference tournament championships, in only its 3rd year of existence as a program. The Raiders went on to play in the NAIA National Championship Tournament 1st Round. He again led the Raiders to the Cascade Collegiate Conference regular season championship in 2018, as the Raiders fell short in the 2nd Round of the NAIA National Tournament. He has also shown to be in process of attaining United States Soccer Federation coaching licenses.

== Honors ==
Individual

- 2005 NSCAA Junior College All-West Region Team
