= 2020 NCAA Division I men's soccer rankings =

- Season: 2020
- NCAA Tournament: 2020
- Preseason No. 1: None
- NCAA Tournament Champions: Marshall
NCAA Division I men's soccer rankings


Four major human polls make up the 2020 NCAA Division I men's soccer rankings: United Soccer Coaches, Top Drawer Soccer, Soccer America, and CollegeSoccerNews.com. However, due to the COVID-19 pandemic, only the United Soccer Coaches poll was released. No pre-season poll was released and a five team poll was released on September 22, 2020 as the first poll of the season. The United Soccer Coaches resumed releasing a poll for the Spring Season on March 2, 2021.

Top Drawer Soccer released a national ranking on February 1 for the Spring Season. The ranking took into account records of teams that played in the fall.

== Legend ==
	Increase in ranking
	Decrease in ranking
	New to rankings from previous week
Italics	Number of first place votes
(#–#)	Win–loss record
т	Tied with team above or below also with this symbol

== Fall 2020 ==
=== United Soccer Coaches ===
	Week 1 Sep 22	Week 2 Sep 29	Week 3 Oct 6	Week 4 Oct 13	Week 5 Oct 20	Week 6 Oct 27	Week 7 Nov 3	Week 8 Nov 10	Week 9 Nov 17	Final Nov 24	
1.	Wake Forest	Wake Forest (1–0–0)	Wake Forest (2–0–0)	Wake Forest (3–0–0)	Pittsburgh (4–0–0)	Pittsburgh (5–0–0)	Pittsburgh (5–0–0)	Pittsburgh (5–0–0)	Pittsburgh (6–0–0)	Clemson (8–2–1)	1.
2.	Clemson	Pittsburgh (1–0–0)	Pittsburgh (1–0–0)	Pittsburgh (3–0–0)	Wake Forest (4–1–0)	Wake Forest (5–1–0)	Wake Forest (6–1–0)	Wake Forest (7–1–0)	Clemson (6–2–1)	Pittsburgh (7–1–0)	2.
3.	Virginia	Clemson (0–0–0)	Clemson (2–0–0)	North Carolina (2–0–0)	Clemson (4–1–0)	Clemson (5–1–0)	Kentucky (5–1–0)	North Carolina (3–1–2)	Wake Forest (7–2–0)	Wake Forest (7–2–0)	3.
4.	Pittsburgh	Kentucky (2–1–0)	Kentucky (3–1–0)	Kentucky (3–1–0)	Kentucky (5–1–0)	Kentucky (5–1–0)	North Carolina (2–1–2)	Clemson (5–2–1)	North Carolina (3–2–2)	Virginia Tech (3–2–2)	4.
5.	Notre Dame	Virginia (0–0–0)	Virginia (0–0–0)	Virginia (1–0–0)	North Carolina (2–1–0)	North Carolina (2–1–0)	Clemson (5–2–1)	Virginia Tech (3–1–2)	Coastal Carolina (6–1–1)	Coastal Carolina (6–1–1)	5.
	Week 1 Sep 22	Week 2 Sep 29	Week 3 Oct 6	Week 4 Oct 13	Week 5 Oct 20	Week 6 Oct 27	Week 7 Nov 3	Week 8 Nov 10	Week 9 Nov 17	Final Nov 24	
		Dropped: No. 5 Notre Dame	None	Dropped: No. 3 Clemson	Dropped: No. 5 Virginia	None	None	Dropped: No. 3 Kentucky	Dropped: No. 5 Virginia Tech	Dropped: No. 4 North Carolina	

== Spring 2021 ==
=== United Soccer Coaches ===
	Week 1 Mar 2	Week 2 Mar 9	Week 3 Mar 16	Week 4 Mar 23	Week 5 Mar 30	Week 6 Apr 6	Week 7 Apr 13	Week 8 Apr 20	Final May 18	
1.	Clemson (16) (8–2–1)	Clemson (23) (9–2–1)	Clemson (19) (10–2–1)	Clemson (24) (11–2–1)	Clemson (23) (12–2–1)	Pittsburgh (13) (12–2–0)	Pittsburgh (16) (13–2–0)	Clemson (21) (13–3–2)	Marshall (21) (13–2–3)	1.
2.	SMU (1) (3–0–0)	Stanford (1) (4–0–0)	Stanford (4) (6–0–0)	Georgetown (4–0–2)	Georgetown (5–0–2)	Georgetown (8) (6–0–2)	Georgetown (7) (7–0–2)	Indiana (9–1–1)	Indiana (1) (12–2–2)	2.
3.	Stanford (4) (4–0–0)	Georgetown (1) (2–0–1)	Georgetown (2) (3–0–1)	Oregon State (7–1–0)	Pittsburgh (1) (11–2–0)	Clemson (4) (12–2–2)	Indiana (8–1–0)	Pittsburgh (1) (13–3–0)	Pittsburgh (2) (16–4–0)	3.
4.	Pittsburgh (2) (8–1–0)	Wake Forest (9–2–0)	Oregon State (1) (7–1–0)	Washington (7–1–0)	Wake Forest (1) (11–2–1)	Wake Forest (11–2–2)	Clemson (1) (12–3–2)	Wake Forest (2) (11–2–2)	North Carolina (1) (9–5–4)	4.
5.	Georgetown (3) (1–0–0)	Oregon State (1) (5–0–0)	Wake Forest (9–2–1)	Pittsburgh (10–2–0)	Indiana (7–1–0)	Stanford (8–1–1)	Wake Forest (11–2–2)	Stanford (9–2–1)	Georgetown (10–2–2)	5.
6.	Wake Forest (8–2–0)	Michigan (3–0–0)	Washington (6–2–0)	Wake Forest (10–2–1)	Stanford (7–1–1)	Indiana (7–1–0)	Washington (1) (10–2–0)	Seton Hall (9–1–3)	Wake Forest (13–3–2)	6.
7.	Kentucky (7–1–1)	Washington (3–1–0)	Pittsburgh (9–2–0)	Indiana (1) (5–1–0)	Washington (8–2–0)	Washington (9–2–0)	Loyola Marymount (6–0–2)	Georgetown (1) (8–1–2)	Clemson (14–3–3)	7.
8.	Washington (3–1–0)	Pittsburgh (8–2–0)	Marshall (4–1–1)	Marshall (6–1–1)	Missouri State (7–0–0)	Missouri State (9–0–0)	Stanford (8–2–1)	Washington (10–4–0)	Washington (10–4–0)	8.
9.	Michigan (2–0–0)	SMU (3–1–0)	Indiana (3–1–0)	Stanford (6–1–0)	UNC Wilmington (5–0–2)	Seton Hall (7–1–3)	Marhsall (8–2–2)	Loyola Marymount (6–0–2)	Seton Hall (10–2–3)	9.
10.	Oregon State (5–0–0)	Kentucky (8–2–1)	Michigan (3–1–0)	Missouri State (6–0–0)	Loyola Marymount (5–0–1)	Loyola Marymount (5–0–2)	New Hampshire (6–0–1)	Marshall (9–2–2)	Standford (10–3–1)	10.
11.	Loyola Marymount (2–0–0)	Marshall (4–1–1)	Kentucky (9–2–1)	Michigan (3–1–1)	Seton Hall (7–1–3)	New Hampshire (5–0–1)	Seton Hall (7–1–3)	New Hampshire (8–0–1)	Penn State (10–2–2)	11.
12.	Marshall (3–0–1)	Loyola Marymount (3–0–0)	UNC Wilmington (4–0–1)	UNC Wilmington (4–0–2)	New Hampshire (4–0–1)	Marshall (7–2–2)	Charlotte (5–2–1)	Penn State (8–1–2)	Missouri State (12–2–0)	12.
13.	Virginia Tech (4–2–2)	Providence (3–0–1)	Missouri State (3–0–0)	Loyola Marymount (4–0–1)	Marshall (5–2–2)	UNC Wilmington (5–1–2)	Missouri State (9–1–0)	Missouri State (11–1–0)	UCF (9–4–1)	13.
14.	Providence (2–0–0)	UNC Wilmington (3–0–1)	Loyola Marymount (3–0–1)	New Hampshire (3–0–1)	Michigan (4–2–1)	Charlotte (4–2–1)	Penn State (7–1–1)	Charlotte (6–3–1)	Marquette (8–2–2)	14.
15.	Liberty (2–0–0)	Akron (2–0–1)	North Carolina (5–3–2)	Seton Hall (6–1–3)	North Carolina (6–3–3)	Grand Canyon (6–0–0)	North Carolina (7–4–3)	Oregon State (9–4–0)	Virginia Tech (7–6–4)	15.
16.	Northwestern (2–1–0)	Oral Roberts (7–0–0)	SMU (3–2–0)	North Carolina (5–3–3)	Grand Canyon (6–0–0)	Coastal Carolina (9–2–2)	Grand Canyon (7–0–0)	North Carolina (7–4–3)	Kentucky (12–5–2)	16.
17.	St. Louis (4–1–0)	New Hampshire (2–0–0)	New Hampshire (2–0–1)	Charlotte (3–2–1)	Charlotte (3–2–1)	Marquette (8–1–1)	Marquette (8–1–1)	James Madison (5–0–3)	Loyola Marymount (6–0–3)	17.
18.	New Hampshire (1–0–0)	Coastal Carolina (7–2–1)	Oral Roberts (7–1–0)	Kentucky (9–3–1)	Marquette (8–1–1)	North Carolina (6–4–3)	James Madison (5–0–1)	UCF (8–3–1)	Oregon State (9–5–0)	18.
19.	Indiana (2–1–0)	Missouri State (2–0–0)	Coastal Carolina (7–2–1)	Akron (3–1–1)	Oregon State (7–3–0)	Penn State (6–1–1)	Oregon State (8–4–0)	Marquette (8–2–1)	New Hampshire (8–1–1)	19.
20.	UNC Wilmington (2–0–1)	Liberty (5–1–1)	Saint Mary's (2–0–1)	Grand Canyon (5–0–0)	Saint Mary's (5–0–1)	Michigan (5–3–1)	UCF (7–3–0)	Grand Canyon (8–1–0)	Charlotte (6–3–2)	20.
21.	Saint Mary's (2–0–0)	Virginia Tech (4–3–2)	Ohio State (3–1–0)	Marquette (6–1–1)	Akron (3–1–1)	James Madison (4–0–1)	Coastal Carolina (9–3–2)	Saint Mary's (6–2–1)	James Madison (5–2–3)	21.
22.	UIC (3–0–1)	Saint Mary's (1–0–1)	Seton Hall (5–1–2)	SMU (4–2–0)	Coastal Carolina (8–2–2)	High Point (9–1–0)	Northern Kentucky (7–1–0)	High Point (12–1–0)	Fordham (7–1–2)	22.
23.	Coastal Carolina (6–2–1)	Indiana (2–1–0)	Akron (2–1–1)	Saint Mary's (4–0–1)	Tulsa (5–1–1)	Saint Mary's (4–2–1)	Saint Mary's (5–2–1)	Fordham (7–0–2)	High Point (12–2–0)	23.
24.	Oral Roberts (5–0–0)	Virginia (5–4–1)	Grand Canyon (5–0–0)	Coastal Carolina (7–2–2)	UIC (6–1–1)	UCF (6–3–0)	Lafayette (6–0–0)	Kentucky (11–4–2)	Coastal Carolina (9–4–2)	24.
25.	Tulsa (2–0–0)	SIU Edwardsville (4–0–0)	Marquette (4–1–1)	Tulsa (4–1–1)	High Point (8–1–0)	UTRGV (5–1–2)	Virginia Tech (6–6–2)	Coastal Carolina (9–4–2)	Grand Canyon (8–2–0)	25.
	Week 1 Mar 2	Week 2 Mar 9	Week 3 Mar 16	Week 4 Mar 23	Week 5 Mar 30	Week 6 Apr 6	Week 7 Apr 13	Week 8 Apr 20	Final May 18	
		Dropped: No. 16 Northwestern; No. 17 St. Louis; No. 22 UIC; No. 25 Tulsa	Dropped: No. 13 Providence; No. 20 Liberty; No. 21 Virginia Tech; No. 24 Virginia; No. 25 SIU Edwardsville	Dropped: No. 18 Oral Roberts; No. 21 Ohio State	Dropped: No. 18 Kentucky; No. 22 SMU	Dropped: No. 19 Oregon State; No. 21 Akron; No. 23 Tulsa; No. 24 UIC	Dropped: No. 20 Michigan; No. 22 High Point; No. 25 UTRGV	Dropped: No. 22 Northern Kentucky; No. 24 Lafayette; No. 25 Virginia Tech	Dropped: No. 21 Saint Mary's	

=== Top Drawer Soccer ===
	Preseason Feb 1	Week 1 Feb 8	Week 2 Feb 15	Week 3 Feb 22	Week 4 Mar 1	Week 5 Mar 8	Week 6 Mar 15	Week 7 Mar 22	Week 8 Mar 29	Week 9 Apr 5	Week 10 Apr 12	Week 11 Apr 19	Week 12 May 3	Week 13 May 10	Final May 18	
1.	Georgetown (0–0–0)	Georgetown (0–0–0)	Georgetown (0–0–0)	Georgetown (0–0–0)	Georgetown (1–0–0)	Clemson (9–2–1)	Clemson (10–2–1)	Clemson (11–2–1)	Clemson (12–2–1)	Clemson (12–2–2)	Georgetown (7–0–2)	Clemson (13–3–2)	Clemson (14–3–2)	Pittsburgh (15–3–0)	Marshall (11–2–3)	1.
2.	Clemson (8–2–1)	Clemson (8–2–1)	Clemson (8–2–1)	Clemson (8–2–1)	Clemson (8–2–1)	Georgetown (2–0–1)	Georgetown (3–0–1)	Georgetown (4–0–2)	Georgetown (5–0–2)	Georgetown (6–0–2)	Wake Forest (11–2–2)	Wake Forest (11–2–2)	Wake Forest (12–2–2)	Wake Forest (13–2–2)	Indiana (11–1–2)	2.
3.	Pittsburgh (7–1–0)	Pittsburgh (7–1–0)	Pittsburgh (7–1–0)	Pittsburgh (7–1–0)	Pittsburgh (8–1–0)	Stanford (5–0–0)	Stanford (6–0–0)	Washington (7–1–0)	Wake Forest (11–2–1)	Wake Forest (11–2–2)	Pittsburgh (13–2–0)	Indiana (9–1–1)	Indiana (9–1–2)	Indiana (10–1–2)	Pittsburgh (16–3–0)	3.
4.	Stanford (0–0–0)	Stanford (0–0–0)	Stanford (1–0–0)	Stanford (3–0–0)	Stanford (4–0–0)	Wake Forest (9–2–0)	Washington (6–1–0)	Wake Forest (10–2–1)	Pittsburgh (11–2–0)	Pittsburgh (12–2–0)	Indiana (8–1–0)	Loyola Marymount (6–0–2)	Georgetown (9–1–2)	Georgetown (10–1–2)	North Carolina (9–4–4)	4.
5.	Wake Forest (7–2–0)	Wake Forest (7–2–0)	Wake Forest (7–2–0)	Wake Forest (7–2–0)	Wake Forest (7–2–0)	Akron (2–0–1)	Wake Forest (9–2–1)	Pittsburgh (10–2–0)	Loyola Marymount (5–0–1)	Indiana (7–1–0)	Clemson (12–3–2)	Georgetown (8–1–2)	Pittsburgh (14–3–0)	Washington (12–3–0)	Wake Forest (13–3–2)	5.
6.	Akron (0–0–0)	Akron (0–0–0)	Akron (0–0–0)	Akron (0–0–0)	SMU (3–0–0)	Oregon State (6–0–0)	Pittsburgh (9–2–0)	Oregon State (7–1–0)	Indiana (7–1–0)	Loyola Marymount (5–0–2)	Loyola Marymount (6–0–2)	Pittsburgh (13–3–0)	Missouri State (12–1–0)	Seton Hall (10–1–4)	Georgetown (10–2–2)	6.
7.	Indiana (0–0–0)	Indiana (0–0–0)	Indiana (0–0–0)	Indiana (1–0–0)	Akron (0–0–1)	Pittsburgh (8–2–0)	Oregon State (6–1–0)	Stanford (6–1–0)	St. Mary's (5–0–1)	Washington (9–2–0)	Washington (10–2–0)	James Madison (5–0–3)	Stanford (10–2–1)	Marshall (10–2–2)	Washington (12–4–0)	7.
8.	SMU (0–0–0)	SMU (1–0–0)	SMU (2–0–0)	SMU (2–0–0)	Oregon State (5–0–0)	Michigan (3–0–0)	Loyola Marymount (3–0–1)	Loyola Marymount (4–0–1)	Washington (8–2–0)	Stanford (8–1–1)	James Madison (5–0–1)	Missouri State (11–1–0)	Washington (11–3–0)	North Carolina (8–4–4)	Seton Hall (10–2–4)	8.
9.	Marshall (0–0–0)	Marshall (0–0–0)	Marshall (0–0–0)	Marshall (1–0–0)	Marshall (3–0–0)	Washington (4–1–0)	Indiana (3–1–0)	Indiana (5–1–0)	Oregon State (7–3–0)	Missouri State (9–0–0)	Missouri State (9–1–0)	Stanford (9–2–1)	Seton Hall (10–1–3)	Clemson (14–3–3)	Clemson (14–3–3)	9.
10.	UCF (0–0–0)	Virginia Tech (2–2–2)	Virginia Tech (2–2–2)	Virginia Tech (2–2–2)	Virginia Tech (4–2–2)	Loyola Marymount (3–0–0)	Akron (2–1–1)	Akron (3–1–1)	Stanford (7–1–1)	St. Mary's (5–1–1)	St. Mary's (5–2–1)	St. Mary's (6–2–1)	Marshall (10–2–1)	Missouri State (12–2–0)	Missouri State (12–2–0)	10.
11.	Virginia Tech (2–2–2)	Notre Dame (5–3–0)	Notre Dame (5–3–0)	Notre Dame (5–3–0)	Notre Dame (6–4–0)	Marshall (4–1–0)	Marshall (5–1–0)	Marshall (6–1–0)	Akron (3–1–1)	James Madison (4–0–1)	Stanford (8–2–1)	Washington (10–3–0)	Penn State (9–1–2)	Stanford (10–3–1)	Stanford (10–3–1)	11.
12.	Notre Dame (5–3–0)	Kentucky (5–1–0)	Kentucky (6–1–0)	Kentucky (7–1–0)	Kentucky (7–1–1)	SMU (3–1–0)	Michigan (3–1–0)	Michigan (3–1–1)	James Madison (3–0–1)	Coastal Carolina (9–2–2)	Seton Hall (7–1–3)	Seton Hall (9–1–3)	Marquette (8–2–2)	Penn State (9–2–2)	Penn State (9–2–2)	12.
13.	Kentucky (5–1–0)	North Carolina (3–2–2)	North Carolina (3–2–2)	Oregon State (4–0–0)	Indiana (2–1–0)	Indiana (2–1–0)	St. Mary's (3–0–1)	St. Mary's (4–0–1)	Missouri State (7–0–0)	Seton Hall (7–1–3)	Marshall (8–2–1)	Marshall (9–2–1)	Kentucky (12–4–2)	Marquette (8–3–2)	Marquette (8–3–2)	13.
14.	North Carolina (3–2–2)	UCF (0–1–0)	UCF (1–1–0)	North Carolina (3–2–2)	Loyola Marymount (2–0–0)	St. Mary's (2–0–1)	James Madison (1–0–1)	James Madison (2–0–1)	UNC Wilmington (5–0–2)	Marshall (7–2–1)	High Point (10–1–0)	High Point (12–1–0)	UCF (9–3–1)	Kentucky (12–5–2)	Kentucky (12–5–2)	14.
15.	Loyola Marymount (0–0–0)	Loyola Marymount (0–0–0)	Loyola Marymount (1–0–0)	Loyola Marymount (1–0–0)	James Madison (1–0–1)	James Madison (1–0–1)	UNC Wilmington (4–0–1)	SMU (4–2–0)	Seton Hall (7–1–3)	High Point (9–1–0)	Coastal Carolina (9–3–2)	Oregon State (9–4–0)	Virginia Tech (7–6–3)	UCF (9–4–1)	UCF (9–4–1)	15.
16.	Washington (0–0–0)	Washington (2–0–0)	Washington (2–0–0)	Saint Mary's (0–0–0)	Saint Mary's (2–0–0)	UNC Wilmington (3–0–1)	Kentucky (9–2–1)	Missouri State (5–0–0)	Marshall (6–2–1)	Marquette (8–1–1)	Marquette (8–1–1)	New Hampshire (8–0–1)	North Carolina (7–4–4)	Virginia Tech (7–6–4)	Virginia Tech (7–6–4)	16.
17.	Saint Mary's (0–0–0)	Saint Mary's (0–0–0)	Saint Mary's (0–0–0)	James Madison (0–0–1)	UNC Wilmington (2–0–1)	Virginia Tech (4–3–2)	SMU (3–2–0)	UNC Wilmington (4–0–2)	Michigan (4–2–1)	UNC Wilmington (5–1–2)	UNC Wilmington (5–2–2)	Penn State (8–1–2)	Loyola Marymount (6–0–3)	Loyola Marymount (6–0–3)	Loyola Marymount (6–0–3)	17.
18.	James Madison (0–0–0)	James Madison (0–0–0)	James Madison (0–0–0)	UNC Wilmington (2–0–0)	St. Louis (4–1–0)	Kentucky (8–2–1)	Virginia Tech (4–4–2)	Seton Hall (6–1–3)	High Point (8–1–0)	Oregon State (7–4–0)	Oregon State (8–4–0)	Marquette (8–2–1)	James Madison (5–1–3)	James Madison (5–1–3)	James Madison (5–1–3)	18.
19.	Charlotte (0–0–0)	Charlotte (0–0–0)	Charlotte (0–0–0)	Coastal Carolina (6–1–1)	Michigan (2–0–0)	Providence (3–0–1)	Seton Hall (5–1–2)	Kentucky (9–3–1)	Marquette (8–1–1)	Penn State (6–1–1)	Penn State (7–1–1)	UNC Wilmington (5–3–2)	Oregon State (9–5–0)	Oregon State (9–5–0)	Oregon State (9–5–0)	19.
20.	Coastal Carolina (6–1–1)	Coastal Carolina (6–1–1)	Coastal Carolina (6–1–1)	Penn State (1–0–0)	Washington (3–1–0)	Coastal Carolina (7–2–1)	Coastal Carolina (7–2–1)	High Point (6–1–0)	Coastal Carolina (8–2–2)	New Hampshire (5–0–1)	New Hampshire (6–0–1)	Grand Canyon (8–1–0)	New Hampshire (8–1–1)	New Hampshire (8–1–1)	New Hampshire (8–1–1)	20.
21.	Maryland (0–0–0)	Maryland (0–0–0)	Maryland (0–0–0)	St. John's (1–0–0)	Coastal Carolina (6–2–1)	Oral Roberts (6–0–0)	Oral Roberts (7–1–0)	Marquette (6–1–1)	Penn State (6–1–0)	Akron (3–2–1)	Michigan (6–3–1)	Charlotte (6–3–1)	Grand Canyon (8–2–0)	Grand Canyon (8–2–0)	Grand Canyon (8–2–0)	21.
22.	Portland (0–0–0)	Portland (0–0–0)	Oregon State (3–0–0)	Washington (2–1–0)	Tulsa (2–0–0)	FIU (2–1–0)	Ohio State (3–1–0)	Coastal Carolina (7–2–2)	New Hampshire (4–0–1)	Michigan (5–3–1)	Grand Canyon (7–0–0)	Kentucky (11–4–2)	High Point (12–2–0)	High Point (12–2–0)	High Point (12–2–0)	22.
23.	Penn State (0–0–0)	Penn State (0–0–0)	Penn State (0–0–0)	Maryland (0–1–0)	High Point (3–0–0)	Ohio State (3–1–0)	Missouri State (4–0–0)	New Hampshire (3–0–1)	Grand Canyon (6–0–0)	Grand Canyon (6–0–0)	Northern Kentucky (7–1–0)	UNC Greensboro (9–2–2)	St. Mary's (6–2–1)	St. Mary's (6–2–1)	St. Mary's (6–2–1)	23.
24.	St. John's (0–0–0)	St. John's (0–0–0)	St. John's (0–0–0)	Michigan (1–0–0)	FIU (1–1–0)	Missouri State (2–0–0)	High Point (5–1–0)	Grand Canyon (5–0–0)	Furman (6–1–0)	Northern Kentucky (7–1–0)	Charlotte (5–2–1)	Fordham (7–0–2)	Charlotte (6–3–2)	Charlotte (6–3–2)	Charlotte (6–3–2)	24.
25.	FIU (0–0–0)	FIU (0–0–0)	FIU (0–0–0)	FIU (0–0–0)	Seton Hall (3–0–1)	Seton Hall (3–1–2)	New Hampshire (2–0–1)	Ohio State (3–2–1)	UIC (6–1–1)	Furman (7–1–1)	Lafayette (6–0–0)	Coastal Carolina (9–4–2)	Fordham (7–1–2)	Fordham (7–1–2)	Fordham (7–1–2)	25.
	Preseason Feb 1	Week 1 Feb 8	Week 2 Feb 15	Week 3 Feb 22	Week 4 Mar 1	Week 5 Mar 8	Week 6 Mar 15	Week 7 Mar 22	Week 8 Mar 29	Week 9 Apr 5	Week 10 Apr 12	Week 11 Apr 19	Week 12 May 3	Week 13 May 10	Final May 18	
		Dropped: None	Dropped: No. 22 Portland	Dropped: No. 14 UCF; No. 19 Charlotte	Dropped: No. 14 North Carolina; No. 20 Penn State; No. 21 St. John's; No. 23 Maryland	Dropped: No. 11 Notre Dame; No. 18 St. Louis; No. 22 Tulsa; No. 23 High Point	Dropped: No. 19 Providence; No. 22 FIU	Dropped: No. 18 Virginia Tech; No. 21 Oral Roberts	Dropped: No. 15 SMU; No. 19 Kentucky; No. 25 Ohio State	Dropped: No. 25 UIC	Dropped: No. 21 Akron; No. 25 Furman	Dropped: No. 21 Michigan; No. 23 Northern Kentucky; No. 25 Lafayette	Dropped: No. 19 UNC Wilmington; No. 23 UNC Greensboro; No. 25 Coastal Carolina	None	None	
