= List of All-Conference USA men's soccer teams =

C-USA Men's Soccer All-Conference Team
- Awarded for: The best overall male soccer players in Conference USA
- Country: United States
- Presented by: C-USA head coaches
- First award: 1995
- Website: http://www.conferenceusa.com/sports/m-soccer/c-usa-m-soccer-body.html

The Conference USA Men's Soccer All-Conference Team is an annual selection of the best overall players in Conference USA during the NCAA Division I men's soccer season. Selections are based on a vote by the head coaches and announced the day prior to the Conference Tournament. The teams are divided into First, Second, and Third All-Conference Teams

== 2014 ==
First-Team All-Conference USA

- GK: Callum Irving, Kentucky
- D: Biko Bradnock-Brennan, Charlotte
- D: Jordan Wilson, Kentucky
- D: Darion Copeland, UAB
- MF: Brandt Bronico, Charlotte
- MF: Napo Matsoso, Kentucky
- MF: Ben McKendry, New Mexico
- MF: Chris Wehan, New Mexico
- F: Kyle Parker, Charlotte
- F: Quentin Albrecht, FIU
- F: Freddy Ruiz, UAB

Second-Team All-Conference USA

- GK: Austin Pack, Charlotte
- D: Mathew Gibbons, New Mexico
- D: Nick Miele, New Mexico
- D: Mahamoudou Kaba, South Carolina
- D: Braeden Troyer, South Carolina
- MF: Nate Foglesong, Old Dominion
- MF: Alex Clay, UAB
- F: Justin Laird, Kentucky
- F: Daniel Jodah, Marshall
- F: James Rogers, New Mexico
- F: Mikkel Knudsen, South Carolina

Third-Team All-Conference USA

- GK: Alex Tiesenhausen, Old Dominion
- D: Marvin Hezel, FIU
- D: Ian Svantesson, UAB
- MF: Dominic Bonilla, Charlotte
- MF: Daniel Gonzalez, FIU
- MF: Kristoffer Tollefsen, Kentucky
- MF: Nick Edginton, Marshall
- MF: Ryan Condotta, Old Dominion
- MF: Kurtis Turner, South Carolina
- F: Monbo Bokar, Charlotte
- F: Ryan Price, FAU
- F: Niko Hansen, New Mexico
- F: Jesse Miralrio, Old Dominion

== 2013 ==
First-Team All-Conference USA

- GK: Callum Irving, Kentucky
- D: Kyle Venter, New Mexico
- D: Jason Gaylord, Old Dominion
- D: Mahamoudou Kaba, South Carolina
- MF: Aidan Kirkbride, Charlotte
- MF: Michael Calderon, New Mexico
- MF: Ben McKendry, New Mexico
- MF: Omar Mata, Tulsa
- F: Giuseppe Gentile, Charlotte
- F: Tim Hokinson, Old Dominion
- F: Cristian Mata, Tulsa
- F: Freddy Ruiz, UAB

Second-Team All-Conference USA

- GK: Sean Stowe, Old Dominion
- D: Thomas Allen, Charlotte
- D: Steven Perinovic, Kentucky
- D: Mathew Gibbons, New Mexico
- D: Braeden Troyer, South Carolina
- MF: Gonzalo Frechilla, FIU
- MF: Brad Doliner, Kentucky
- MF: Akeil Barrett, Tulsa
- MF: Alex Clay, UAB
- F: Quentin Albrecht, FIU
- F: Diego Navarette, UAB

Third-Team All-Conference USA

- GK: Michael Lisch, New Mexico
- GK: Raphael Ville, UAB
- D: Travis Brent, Marshall
- D: Bradley Bourgeois, Tulsa
- D: Darion Copeland, UAB
- MF: Zach Hunter, Marshall
- MF: Michael Kafari, New Mexico
- MF: Tony Rocha, Tulsa
- F: Kyle Parker, Charlotte
- F: Ryan Price, FAU
- F: James Rogers, New Mexico

== 2012 ==
First-Team All-Conference USA

- GK: Daniel Withrow, Marshall
- GK: Jaime Ibarra, SMU
- D: Steven Perinovic, Kentucky
- D: Mladen Lemez, UAB
- D: Andrew Quintana, UCF
- MF: Matt Lodge, Kentucky
- MF: Liam Collins, Memphis
- MF: Omar Mata, Tulsa
- F: Mark Sherrod, Memphis
- F: Cristian Mata, Tulsa
- F: Deshorn Brown, UCF

Second-Team All-Conference USA

- GK: Jack Van Arsdale, Kentucky
- D: Damien Rosales, SMU
- D: Aaron Simmons, SMU
- D: Darion Copeland, UAB
- D: Reed Matte, UAB
- D: Ben Hunt, UCF
- MF: Cameron Wilder, Kentucky
- MF: T.J. Nelson, SMU
- MF: Braeden Troyer, South Carolina
- F: Quentin Albrecht, FIU
- F: Tom Jackson, Marshall
- F: Tyler Engel, SMU
- F: Bradlee Baladez, South Carolina
- F: Kofi Gyawu, UAB

Third-Team All-Conference USA

- GK: Mark Pais, Tulsa
- D: Joseph Dawkins, FIU
- D: Anthony Hobbs, FIU
- D: Dylan Asher, Kentucky
- D: Jordan Johnson, Memphis
- D: Mike Mangotic, South Carolina
- D: Tony Rocha, Tulsa
- MF: Daniel Gonzalez, FIU
- MF: Devin Perkins, Marshall
- MF: Andrew Morales, SMU
- MF: Fatai Alabi, UAB
- MF: Chase Wickham, UAB
- MF: Omar Vallejo, UCF
- F: Tyler Riggs, Kentucky

== 2011 ==
First-Team All-Conference USA

- GK: Daniel Withrow, Marshall
- D: Anthony Hobbs, FIU
- D: Diogo de Almeida, SMU
- D: Andrew Quintana, UCF
- MF: Liam Collins, Memphis
- MF: Warren Creavalle, UCF
- MF: Kevan George, UCF
- F: Mark Sherrod, Memphis
- F: Arthur Ivo, SMU
- F: Bradlee Baladez, South Carolina
- F: Babayele Sodade, UAB

Second-Team All-Conference USA

- GK: Carl Woszczynski, UAB
- D: Dylan Asher, Kentucky
- D: J.J. Greer, Memphis
- D: Reed Matte, UAB
- MF: Tom Jackson, Marshall
- MF: Anthony Virgara, Marshall
- MF: T.J. Nelson, SMU
- MF: Stephen Morrissey, South Carolina
- MF: Omar Mata, Tulsa
- F: Juan Castillo, SMU
- F: Corey Albertson, Tulsa

Third-Team All-Conference USA

- GK: Conor Hurley, Memphis
- D: Danny Cates, South Carolina
- D: Blaine Gonsalves, Tulsa
- D: Mladen Lemez, UAB
- MF: Braeden Troyer, South Carolina
- MF: Tony Rocha, Tulsa
- MF: Nik Robson, UCF
- F: Quentin Albrecht, FIU
- F: Matt Lodge, Kentucky
- F: Tyler Riggs, Kentucky
- F: McKauly Tulloch, UCF

== 2010 ==
First-Team All-Conference USA

- GK: Daniel Withrow, Marshall
- D: Will Traynor, South Carolina
- D: Justin Chavez, Tulsa
- D: Hunter Christiansen, Tulsa
- D: Curtis Ushedo, UAB
- D: Kevan George, UCF
- MF: Arthur Ivo, SMU
- MF: Ashley McInnes, Tulsa
- MF: Warren Creavalle, UCF
- F: Blake Brettschneider, South Carolina
- F: Nik Robson, UCF

Second-Team All-Conference USA

- GK: Jimmy Maurer, South Carolina
- D: Anthony Hobbs, FIU
- D: Dylan Asher, Kentucky
- D: Jordan Hilgefort, Marshall
- D: Leone Cruz, SMU
- D: Yaron Bacher, UCF
- MF: Matt Lodge, Kentucky
- MF: Kekoa Osorio, SMU
- MF: Josue Soto, SMU
- F: Juan Castillo, SMU
- F: Babayele Sodade, UAB

Third-Team All-Conference USA

- GK: Tyler Beadle, Kentucky
- GK: Carl Woszczynski, UAB
- GK: Shawn Doyle, UCF
- D: Nicholas Chase, FIU
- D: Kendall Sutton, Marshall
- D: Chris Taylor, Tulsa
- MF: Sammy Boateng, Marshall
- MF: Michal Mravec, UAB
- F: Michael Muehseler, FIU
- F: Tyler Riggs, Kentucky
- F: Tom Jackson, Marshall
- F: Bradlee Baladez, South Carolina
- F: Austin Neil, Tulsa
- F: Kofi Gyawu, UAB

== 2009 ==
First-Team All-Conference USA

- GK: Carl Woszczynski, UAB
- D: Barry Rice, Kentucky
- D: Tyler Ruthven, South Carolina
- D: Justin Chavez, Tulsa
- MF: Jason Griffiths, Kentucky
- MF: Dustin Dawes, Marshall
- MF: Dane Saintus, SMU
- MF: Ashley McInnes, Tulsa
- F: Sam Arthur, South Carolina
- F: Austin Neil, Tulsa
- F: Two-Boys Gumede, UAB

Second-Team All-Conference USA

- GK: Dan Williams, Kentucky
- GK: Daniel Withrow, Marshall
- D: Rick Alleman, Memphis
- D: Chris Taylor, Tulsa
- D: Curtis Ushedo, UAB
- MF: Payton Hickey, SMU
- MF: Yaron Bacher, UCF
- MF: Kevan George, UCF
- F: Matt Lodge, Kentucky
- F: Jose Parada, Tulsa
- F: Babayele Sodade, UAB

Third-Team All-Conference USA

- GK: Jimmy Maurer, South Carolina
- D: Anthony Hobbs, FIU
- D: Brad Walker, Kentucky
- D: Kendall Sutton, Marshall
- D: Andreas Guenther, Memphis
- D: Ian Kalis, SMU
- MF: Matt Butler, Marshall
- MF: Kekoa Osorio, SMU
- MF: Hunter Christiansen, Tulsa
- MF: Michal Mravec, UAB
- F: Steven Cabas, FIU
- F: Sebastian Frings, FIU
- F: Blake Brettschneider, South Carolina
- F: Nicholas Robson, UCF

== 2008 ==
First-Team All-Conference USA

- GK: Tyrel Lacey, Tulsa
- D: Barry Rice, Kentucky
- D: Michael Coburn, Memphis
- D: Chris Taylor, Tulsa
- MF: Jason Griffiths, Kentucky
- MF: Joe Salem, Tulsa
- MF: Two-Boys Gumede, UAB
- MF: Kevan George, UCF
- F: Juan Guerra, FIU
- F: Sam Arthur, South Carolina
- F: Blake Brettschneider, South Carolina

Second-Team All-Conference USA

- GK: Jimmy Maurer, South Carolina
- D: Tyler Ruthven, South Carolina
- D: Chris Clements, Tulsa
- D: Ryan Roushandel, UCF
- MF: Leone Cruz, SMU
- MF: Jeff Harwell, SMU
- MF: Kekoa Osorio, SMU
- MF: Jeff Scanella, South Carolina
- F: Paulo da Silva, SMU
- F: Ashley McInnes, Tulsa
- F: Austin Neil, Tulsa

Third-Team All-Conference USA

- GK: Dan Williams, Kentucky
- D: Philip Fisher, FIU
- D: Mark Wiltse, South Carolina
- D: Dean Sorrell, UAB
- MF: Masumi Turnbull, Kentucky
- MF: Jira Cooley, Marshall
- MF: Trey Gergory, UAB
- MF: Michal Mrevec, UAB
- F: Sterling Flunder, Marshall
- F: Parker Duncan, Memphis
- F: Jose Parada, Tulsa

== 2007 ==
First-Team All-Conference USA

- GK: Dominic Cervi, Tulsa
- D: Barry Rice, Kentucky
- D: Adrian Chevannes, SMU
- D: Chris Clements, Tulsa
- MF: Bruno Guarda, SMU
- MF: Ben Shuleva, SMU
- MF: Jeff Scanella, South Carolina
- MF: Eric DeFreitas, Tulsa
- F: Juan Guerra, FIU
- F: Jose Parada, Tulsa
- F: Dejan Jakovic, UAB

Second-Team All-Conference USA

- GK: Jimmy Maurer, South Carolina
- D: Jeff Lenix, Marshall
- D: Michael Coburn, Memphis
- D: Ryan Mirsky, SMU
- MF: Masumi Turnbull, Kentucky
- MF: Sterling Flounder, Marshall
- MF: Adam Montgomery, Memphis
- MF: Trey Gregory, UAB
- F: Jared Britcher, Memphis
- F: Dane Saintus, SMU
- F: Ryan Roushandel, UCF

Third-Team All-Conference USA

- GK: Steve Sandbo, SMU
- D: Raoul Voss, FIU
- D: Tyler Ruthven, South Carolina
- D: Mark Wiltse, South Carolina
- MF: John Daniele, Marshall
- MF: Sean Goulding, Memphis
- MF: Scott Corbin, SMU
- MF: Jeff Harwell, SMU
- F: Aaron Swanson, Kentucky
- F: Eric Burkholder, Tulsa
- F: Todd Goddard, Tulsa

== 2006 ==
First-Team All-Conference USA

- GK: Matt Wideman, SMU
- D: Mynor Gonzalez, SMU
- D: Jay Needham, SMU
- D: Ryan Leeton, South Carolina
- MF: Mike D’Agostino, Kentucky
- MF: Bruno Guarda, SMU
- MF: Chase Wileman, SMU
- MF: Dejan Jakovic, UAB
- F: Riley O’Neill, Kentucky
- F: Mike Sambursky, South Carolina
- F: Jerson Monteiro, UAB

Second-Team All-Conference USA

- GK: Mike Gustavson, South Carolina
- D: Nathan Marks, Kentucky
- D: Jeff Lenix, Marshall
- D: Makan Hislop, South Carolina
- MF: Kevin Walsh, Memphis
- MF: Ralph Pace, South Carolina
- MF: Matt Thomas, Tulsa
- MF: Two-Boys Gumede, UAB
- F: David Hope, FIU
- F: Adrian Chevannes, SMU
- F: Jose Parada, Tulsa
- F: Zak Boggs, UCF

Third-Team All-Conference USA

- GK: Dan Williams, Kentucky
- D: Jamie Gilbert, Memphis
- D: Ryan Mirsky, SMU
- D: Chris Clements, Tulsa
- MF: Dadi Kristjánsson, FIU
- MF: Masumi Turnbull, Kentucky
- MF: Ben Shuleva, SMU
- MF: Jeff Scannella, South Carolina
- F: Karim Boukhemis, Marshall
- F: Ayo Akinsete, South Carolina
- F: Eric Burkholder, Tulsa

== 2005 ==
First-Team All-Conference USA

- GK: Andy Gruenebaum, Kentucky
- D: Thomas Senecal, Kentucky
- D: Jay Needham, SMU
- D: Greg Reece, South Carolina
- MF: Lucas Scudeler, FIU
- MF: Dayton O’Brien, Memphis
- MF: David Chun, SMU
- MF: Mike Sambursky, South Carolina
- F: Duke Hashimoto, SMU
- F: Josh Alcala, South Carolina
- F: Kyle Brown, Tulsa

Second-Team All-Conference USA

- GK: Mike Gustavson, South Carolina
- D: Brandon Stewart, Kentucky
- D: Jeff Lenix, Marshall
- D: Dejan Jakovic, UAB
- MF: Karim Boukhemis, Marshall
- MF: Kellan Zindel, SMU
- MF: Matt Wiley, Tulsa
- MF: Sandy Gbandi, UAB
- F: Carron Williams, FIU
- F: Andy Metcalf, Memphis
- F: Jason McLaughlin, UAB

Third-Team All-Conference USA

- GK: A.J. Robles, UAB
- D: Mynor Gonzalez, SMU
- D: Ryan Leeton, South Carolina
- D: Jamie Dabney, Tulsa
- MF: Jared Rose, FIU
- MF: Mike D’Agostino, Kentucky
- MF: Bruno Guarda, SMU
- MF: Ralph Pace, South Carolina
- MF: Eric Burkholder, Tulsa
- F: Maurice Hughes, UAB
- F: Jerson Monteiro, UAB
- F: Billy Judino, UCF

== 2004 ==
First-Team All-Conference USA

- GK: Sebastian Vecchio, Memphis
- D: Justin Dyer, Memphis
- D: Sandi Gbandi, UAB
- D: Kareem Smith, USF
- MF: Floyd Franks, Charlotte
- MF: Daniel Dobson, Memphis
- MF: John DiRaimondo, Saint Louis
- MF: Ryan Wileman, Saint Louis
- MF: Leandro de Oliveira, UAB
- F: Adam Ruud, Charlotte
- F: Dayton O’Brien, Memphis
- F: Will John, Saint Louis

Second-Team All-Conference USA

- GK: Dane Brenner, USF
- D: Matt Neeley, Louisville
- D: Brett Branan, Saint Louis
- D: Tim Ward, Saint Louis
- MF: Jeff Hughes, Cincinnati
- MF: John Liersemann, Cincinnati
- MF: Keeron Benito, USF
- MF: Simon Schoendorf, USF
- F: Wiremu Patrick, Cincinnati
- F: Chris Lee, Marquette
- F: Andy Metcalf, Memphis

Third-Team All-Conference USA

- GK: Mike Vessels, Cincinnati
- D: John Nabers, Charlotte
- D: Ewen Blair, Cincinnati
- D: Gary Connolly, Memphis
- D: Joe Klosterman, UAB
- MF: John Kornfeld, DePaul
- MF: Bryan Dahlquist, Marquette
- MF: John Reilly, Memphis
- MF: Rogerio Oliveira, UAB
- F: Terron Amos, East Carolina
- F: David Guzman, Louisville
- F: Rodrigo Hidalgo, USF
- F: Hunter West, USF

== 2003 ==
First-Team All-Conference USA

- GK: Brad Sokolowski, Louisville
- D: Adrian Cann, Louisville
- D: Nick Gannon, Saint Louis
- D: Tony McManus, UAB
- MF: Tim Brown, Cincinnati
- MF: Josh Gardner, Cincinnati
- MF: Leandro de Oliveira, UAB
- MF: Marin Pusek, UAB
- F: Simon Bird, Louisville
- F: Chris Lee, Marquette
- F: Vedad Ibišević, Saint Louis

Second-Team All-Conference USA

- GK: Martin Hutton, Saint Louis
- D: Anders Cedergren, Cincinnati
- D: Brandon Dobbs, Cincinnati
- D: Andy Pusateri, Saint Louis
- MF: Floyd Franks, Charlotte
- MF: Dayton O’Brien, Memphis
- MF: John DiRaimondo, Saint Louis
- MF: Brian Grazier, Saint Louis
- F: Mira Mupier, Charlotte
- F: Andy Metcalf, Memphis
- F: Will John, Saint Louis

Third-Team All-Conference USA

- GK: John Adams, Cincinnati
- D: Joe Lampert, Charlotte
- D: Matt Neely, Louisville
- D: Graham Gibbs, Memphis
- MF: Clyde Simms, East Carolina
- MF: Cooper McKee, Saint Louis
- MF: Nnamdi Ngwe, UAB
- MF: Keeron Benito, USF
- F: Derek Guiterrez, Marquette
- F: Jerson Monteiro, UAB
- F: Hunter West, USF

== 2002 ==
First-Team All-Conference USA

- GK: Clint Baumstark, UAB
- D: Adrian Cann, Louisville
- D: Steve Lawrence, Marquette
- D: Nick Gannon, Saint Louis
- MF: Joe Hammes, Saint Louis
- MF: Jack Jewsbury, Saint Louis
- MF: Marin Pusek, UAB
- MF: Jeff Thwaites, USF
- F: Jason Cole, Saint Louis
- F: Flavio Monteiro, UAB
- F: Hunter West, USF

Second-Team All-Conference USA

- GK: Troy Perkins, USF
- D: Chris Schmidt, Memphis
- D: Kevin Wickart, Saint Louis
- D: Jared Vock, USF
- MF: Tim Brown, Cincinnati
- MF: Josh Gardner, Cincinnati
- MF: Mike Robards, Marquette
- MF: Nick Walls, Saint Louis
- F: Mira Mupier, Charlotte
- F: Simon Bird, Louisville
- F: Derek Gutierrez, Marquette

Third-Team All-Conference USA

- GK: Martin Hutton, Saint Louis
- D: Brandon Dobbs, Cincinnati
- D: Tom Nolan, Marquette
- D: Tony McManus, UAB
- MF: Shane Carew, Charlotte
- MF: Clyde Simms, East Carolina
- MF: Fernando Tolomelli, Louisville
- MF: Mike Kirchhoff, Saint Louis
- F: Wiremu Patrick, Cincinnati
- F: Luke Rojo, DePaul
- F: Eric Marshall, Marquette

== 2001 ==
First-Team All-Conference USA

- GK: John Politis, Saint Louis
- D: Adrian Cann, Louisville
- D: Jason Cole, Saint Louis
- D: Marty Tappel, Saint Louis
- MF: Sean Reti, Marquette
- MF: Brad Davis, Saint Louis
- MF: Mike Hill, Saint Louis
- MF: Jeff Thwaites, USF
- F: Sean Fraser, Memphis
- F: Dipsy Selolwane, Saint Louis
- F: Jason Cudjoe, USF

Second-Team All-Conference USA

- GK: Lucas Mackanos, Charlotte
- D: Steve Lawrence, Marquette
- D: Brantley Spillman, UAB
- D: Jared Vock, USF
- MF: Justin Stralka, Memphis
- MF: David Beck, Saint Louis
- MF: Nelson Mata, UAB
- MF: Marin Pusek, UAB
- F: Jack Jewsbury, Saint Louis
- F: Flavio Monteiro, UAB
- F: Martin Rey, UAB

Third-Team All-Conference USA

- GK: Clint Baumstark, UAB
- GK: Troy Perkins, USF
- D: Shane Carew, Charlotte
- D: Stephen Lewis, Memphis
- D: Bubba Garcia, UAB
- MF: Bryan Godfrey, Marquette
- MF: Mike Kirchoff, Saint Louis
- MF: Nick Baker, TCU
- MF: Gabriel Salgado, USF
- F: Juan Munoz-Airey, Charlotte
- F: Simon Bird, Louisville
- F: Lars Thorstensen, Memphis

== 2000 ==
First-Team All-Conference USA

- GK: David Clemente, UAB
- D: Adrian Cann, Louisville
- D: Joe Hammes, Saint Louis
- D: Rumbani Munthali, UAB
- MF: Ryan Schreck, Cincinnati
- MF: Shawn Faria, Louisville
- MF: Sean Reti, Marquette
- MF: Brad Davis, Saint Louis
- F: Myron Vaughn, Cincinnati
- F: Sean Fraser, Memphis
- F: Jack Jewsbury, Saint Louis

Second-Team All-Conference USA

- GK: John Politis, Saint Louis
- D: Jamal Frazier, Cincinnati
- D: Stephen Lewis, Memphis
- D: Jason Cole, Saint Louis
- MF: David McGill, Charlotte
- MF: Stuart Langrish, Louisville
- MF: Justin Stralka, Memphis
- MF: Mike Hill, Saint Louis
- F: C.J. Robinson, Charlotte
- F: Marshall Morehead, Marquette
- F: Greg Krauss, USF

Third-Team All-Conference USA

- GK: Jeremy Morales, Louisville
- D: Sean Carew, Charlotte
- D: Ntando Tsambo, Charlotte
- D: Steve Lawrence, Marquette
- MF: David Pedreschi, Charlotte
- MF: Andy Hunter, Marquette
- MF: Marty Tappel, Saint Louis
- MF: Roberto Najarro, UAB
- MF: Houston Smith, UAB
- F: Juan Munoz-Airey, Charlotte
- F: Shane Hudson, DePaul
- F: Lars Thorstensen, Memphis

== 1999 ==
First-Team All-Conference USA

- GK: Paul Nagy, Saint Louis
- D: Andrew Kean, Cincinnati
- D: Rumbani Munthali, UAB
- D: Brian Alvero, USF
- MF: Ryan Schreck, Cincinnati
- MF: Sean Reti, Marquette
- MF: Jeff DiMaria, Saint Louis
- MF: Jason Mims, Saint Louis
- F: Marshall Morehead, Marquette
- F: Peter Byaruhanga, UAB
- F: Kevin Alvero, USF

Second-Team All-Conference USA

- GK: David Clemente, UAB
- D: C.J. Robinson, Charlotte
- D: Jason Cole, Saint Louis
- D: David Williams, Saint Louis
- MF: Jamath Shoffner, Charlotte
- MF: Shawn Faria, Louisville
- MF: Andy Hunter, Marquette
- MF: Matt Cavenaugh, USF
- F: George Zabaneh, Louisville
- F: Sean Fraser, Memphis
- F: Flavio Monteiro, UAB

Third-Team All-Conference USA

- GK: Jake Witkowski, Cincinnati
- D: Stuart Langrish, Louisville
- D: Chad Garofola, Marquette
- D: Steve Lawrence, Marquette
- MF: Johan Cedergren, Cincinnati
- MF: Joe Ahearn, DePaul
- MF: Joe Hammes, Saint Louis
- MF: Brian Waltrip, USF
- F: Stephen Miller, Charlotte
- F: Chris Greer, DePaul
- F: Vedad Alagic, Saint Louis

== 1998 ==
First-Team All-Conference USA

- GK: Jim Welch, Marquette
- D: C.J. Robinson, Charlotte
- D: Kevin Kalish, Saint Louis
- D: Ken Costello, USF
- MF: Christian Lund, Charlotte
- MF: Jeff DiMaria, Saint Louis
- MF: Brian Alvero, USF
- MF: Jeff Houser, USF
- F: Jon Mabee, Charlotte
- F: Kevin Alvero, USF
- F: Brian Waltrip, USF

Second-Team All-Conference USA

- GK: Jake Witkowski, Cincinnati
- D: Andrew Kean, Cincinnati
- D: Brad Ruzzo, Cincinnati
- D: Wes Elias, USF
- MF: Pablo Pinzon, Charlotte
- MF: Jason Mims, Saint Louis
- MF: Mike Moriarty, Saint Louis
- MF: Rumbani Munthali, UAB
- F: David Hughes, Charlotte
- F: Brian Benton, Saint Louis
- F: Peter Byaruhanga, UAB

Third-Team All-Conference USA

- GK: Skip Miller, USF
- D: Jeremiah Bass, Marquette
- D: Chris Howle, UAB
- D: Thor-Arne Loveland, USF
- MF: Jamath Shoffner, Charlotte
- MF: Shawn Faria, Louisville
- MF: Stuart Langrish, Louisville
- MF: Matt Briggs, Memphis
- F: Myron Vaughn, Cincinnati
- F: Steven Brooks, Memphis
- F: Erik Kuster, UAB

== 1997 ==
First-Team All-Conference USA

- GK: Jim Welch, Marquette
- D: Ben Parry, Charlotte
- D: Max Stoka, Marquette
- D: Kevin Kalish, Saint Louis
- MF: Matthys Barker, Charlotte
- MF: Kevin Quigley, Saint Louis
- MF: Joe Mattacchione, UAB
- MF: Brian Waltrip, USF
- F: David Hughes, Charlotte
- F: Rogerio Lima, Memphis
- F: Jeff Cunningham, USF

Second-Team All-Conference USA

- GK: Casey Klipfel, Saint Louis
- D: Jim Kunevicius, Charlotte
- D: Mike Moriarty, Saint Louis
- D: Rumbani Munthali, UAB
- MF: Christian Lund, Charlotte
- MF: Donny Mark, Marquette
- MF: Brian Corcoran, UAB
- MF: Darick Metrius, USF
- F: Drew Watzka, Marquette
- F: Emmanuel Eloundou, UAB
- F: Jeff Houser, USF

Third-Team All-Conference USA

- GK: Mike Mobley, Cincinnati
- D: Jeremiah Bass, Marquette
- D: Ken Costello, Saint Louis
- D: Tim Tedoni, Saint Louis
- MF: Shawn Faria, Louisville
- MF: Stuart Langrish, Louisville
- MF: Ramon Aguillon, Memphis
- MF: Tony Carpenter, USF
- F: Brian Benton, Saint Louis
- F: Joe DiNardo, UAB
- F: Erik Kuster, UAB

== 1996 ==
First-Team All-Conference USA

- GK: Jon Busch, Charlotte
- D: Joe Mattacchione, UAB
- MF: Matthys Barker, Charlotte
- MF: Fergal Forde, Memphis
- F: Drew Watzka, Marquette
- F: Rogerio Lima, Memphis
- F: Mark Filla, Saint Louis
- F: Emmanuel Eloundou, UAB
- F: Jeff Cunningham, USF
- F: Todd Denault, USF

Second-Team All-Conference USA

- D: Jim Kunevicius, Charlotte
- D: Scott Ziemba, Marquette
- MF: Christian Lund, Charlotte
- MF: Tim Hamm, Cincinnati
- MF: Antonio Azcona, Louisville
- MF: Billy Solberg, Marquette
- MF: Kevin Quigley, Saint Louis
- MF/F: Tim Leonard, Saint Louis
- F: Kevin Berry, Marquette
- F: Erik Kuster, UAB
- F: Thomas Holmen, USF

Third-Team All-Conference USA

- GK: Mike Mobley, Cincinnati
- GK: Loukas Papaconstantinou, UAB
- D: Kevin Bateman, DePaul
- D: Ken Costello, Saint Louis
- D: Mike Moriarty, Saint Louis
- D: Esa Tabi, UAB
- D: Danny Ziannis, UAB
- MF/D: Michael Kim, Louisville
- MF: Matt Bradner, Charlotte
- F: Stephen Pugliese, Charlotte
- F: Dan Stokes, DePaul

== 1995 ==
First-Team All-Conference USA

- GK: Jon Busch, Charlotte
- GK: Loukas Papaconstantinou, UAB
- D: Mike Franks, Charlotte
- MF: Billy Solberg, Marquette
- MF: Eric Cherveny, Saint Louis
- MF: Matt McKeon, Saint Louis
- F: Mac Cozier, Charlotte
- F: Cedric Thompson, DePaul
- F: Jacob Thomas, Saint Louis
- F: William Guimmarra, UAB
- F: Jeff Cunningham, USF

Second-Team All-Conference USA

- D: Joe Mattacchione, UAB
- D: Danny Ziannis, UAB
- MF: Billy Hamilton, Cincinnati
- MF: Antonio Azcona, Louisville
- MF: Fergal Forde, Memphis
- MF: Kevin Quigley, Saint Louis
- MF: Brian Corcoran, UAB
- MF: Mike Mekelburg, USF
- MF/F: Cory Butler, Marquette
- F: Bernard Licari, Memphis
- F: Mats Hagedorn, UAB

Honorable Mention All-Conference USA

- GK: Jim Welch, Marquette
- D: Grady Farmer, Charlotte
- D: James LaBar, Cincinnati
- D: Scott Ziemba, Marquette
- D: Mike Moriarty, Saint Louis
- D: Pat Moriarty, Saint Louis
- D: Todd Denault, USF
- D: Trip Ellis, USF
- MF/D: Michael Kim, Louisville
- MF: Patric Gross, Marquette
- F: Thomas Holmen, USF
