= 2017 Conference USA men's soccer season =

- League: NCAA Division I
- Sport: Soccer
- Duration: August 25, 2017 – November 12, 2017
- Teams: 8

2018 MLS SuperDraft
- Top draft pick: Paul Marie, FIU
- Picked by: San Jose Earthquakes, 12th overall

Regular Season
- Season champions: FIU
- Runners-up: Old Dominion
- Season MVP: Santiago Patino, FIU

Tournament
- Champions: Old Dominion
- Runners-up: Charlotte
- Finals MVP: O: Niko Klosterhalfenm; D: Mercan Akar

C-USA men's soccer seasons
- ← 2016 2018 →

2017 Conference USA men's soccer standings
	Conf.					Overall
Team	W		L		T	W		L		T
No. 20 FIU +	6	–	0	–	2	12	–	2	–	4
Old Dominion ‡	6	–	2	–	0	13	–	6	–	2
Kentucky	4	–	2	–	2	8	–	6	–	4
New Mexico	3	–	3	–	2	8	–	6	–	4
Charlotte	2	–	1	–	5	8	–	5	–	6
Marshall	3	–	5	–	0	8	–	10	–	1
South Carolina	2	–	4	–	2	6	–	9	–	2
Florida Atlantic	2	–	6	–	0	2	–	14	–	0
UAB	1	–	6	–	1	5	–	7	–	4
‡ – 2017 CUSA Tournament champion + – Invited to the 2017 NCAA Division I Men's Soccer Championship; As of December 13, 2017; Rankings from United Soccer Coaches

The 2017 Conference USA men's soccer season was the 23rd season of men's varsity soccer in the conference. The season began on August 25 and concluded on November 12.

The regular season was won by FIU, while the tournament was won by Old Dominion. Both school's were the conference's bids into the 2017 NCAA Division I Men's Soccer Championship. There, the two programs reached the round of 32 before being eliminated.

Niko Klosterhalfenm and Mercan Akar were named the conference's offensive and defensive most valuable players, respectively. Paul Marie and Alex Bumpus were drafted in the 2018 MLS SuperDraft following the end of the season. Jason Beaulieu and Aaron Herrera signed homegrown contracts with their parent MLS clubs.

== Background ==
=== Head coaches ===
Three programs had first-year head coaches heading into the 2017 season. Former University of Charleston head coach, Chris Grassie was hired as the head coach for Marshall. Former Orlando City SC scout, Kevin Nylen was named the head coach for FIU. Finally, former South Carolina assistant coach, Joey Worthen, was named head coach for Florida Atlantic.

Team	Head coach	Previous job	Years at school	Overall record	Record at school	C-USA record	NCAA Tournaments	NCAA College Cups	NCAA Titles
Charlotte	Kevin Langan	Charlotte (asst.)	6	64–24–12 (.700)	64–24–12 (.700)	30–7–5 (.774)	5	0	0
FIU	Kevin Nylen	Orlando City SC (scout)	1	0–0–0 (–)	0–0–0 (–)	0–0–0 (–)	0	0	0
Florida Atlantic	Joey Worthen	South Carolina (asst.)	1	0–0–0 (–)	0–0–0 (–)	0–0–0 (–)	0	0	0
Kentucky	Johan Cedergren	Dartmouth	6	102–64–26 (.599)	50–34–12 (.583)	24–11–6 (.659)	9	0	0
Marshall	Chris Grassie	Charleston (WV)	1	99–20–8 (.811)	0–0–0 (–)	0–0–0 (–)	0	0	0
New Mexico	Jeremy Fishbein	Incarnate Word	16	294–133–46 (.670)	199–73–36 (.705)	17–12–4 (.576)	12	2	0
Old Dominion	Alan Dawson	North Carolina (asst.)	21	349–155–47 (.676)	220–125–37 (.624)	16–13–3 (.547)	13	0	0
South Carolina	Mark Berson	The Citadel	39	494–231–71 (.665)	483–226–71 (.665)	49–32–17 (.587)	22	3	0
UAB	Mike Getman	Harvard	25	311–202–49 (.597)	269–176–40 (.596)	101–67–16 (.592)	8	0	0

== Preseason ==
=== Recruiting ===
National Rankings
Team	CSN	TDS
Charlotte	NR	NR
FIU	NR	36
Florida Atlantic	NR	NR
Kentucky	NR	NR
Marshall	NR	NR
New Mexico	NR	NR
Old Dominion	NR	NR
South Carolina	NR	NR
UAB	NR	NR

=== Preseason poll ===
The preseason poll was announced on August 11, 2017. Charlotte was voted to win the Conference USA regular season. New Mexico, FIU and UAB received first place votes.

	CUSA Coaches
1.	Charlotte (4)
2.	New Mexico (2)
3.	FIU (2)
4.	Kentucky
5.	South Carolina
6.	UAB (1)
7.	Old Dominion
8.	Marshall
9.	Florida Atlantic

=== Preseason team ===
On August 11, the preseason team was announced.

Recipient	School	Grade	Pos.
^Elliot Panicco^	Charlotte	R-So.	GK
Santiago Patino*	FIU	Jr.	FW
Paul Marie	FIU	Sr.	DF
Bjorn Gudjonsson	South Carolina	Jr.	FW
David Valverde	UAB	Sr.	MF
Julian Veen Uldal	South Carolina	So.	MF
Alex Bumpus	Kentucky	Sr.	DF
Peyton Ericson	South Carolina	Jr.	MF / DF
Joris Ahlinvi	FIU	So.	MF
Niko Klosterhalfen	ODU	Jr.	MF
Tom Smart	New Mexico	R-So.	D
Matthew Constant	New Mexico	So.	D

*Preseason Offensive Player of the Year
^Preseason Defensive Player of the Year

== Regular season ==
=== Early season tournaments ===
Three programs participated in early season tournaments. FIU and New Mexico finished undefeated in their respective tournaments, while ODU finished in third place.

Team	Tournament	Finish
FIU	Wolstein Classic	1-0-1 (2nd)
New Mexico	Grange and Ashwill Invitational	2-0-0 (1st)
Old Dominion	ODU Soccer Classic	0-1-1 (3rd)

=== Rankings ===
==== United Soccer Coaches National ====
Legend
Increase in ranking
Decrease in ranking
Not ranked previous week

		Pre	Wk 1	Wk 2	Wk 3	Wk 4	Wk 5	Wk 6	Wk 7	Wk 8	Wk 9	Wk 10	Wk 11	Wk 12	Final
Charlotte	C	15	16	25	RV	RV	RV								
FIU	C		RV	RV	RV	RV	RV	17	14	11	8	7	8	13	20
Florida Atlantic	C														
Kentucky	C		RV	19	13	15	13	20	21	NR		RV			
Marshall	C														
New Mexico	C	20	RV	RV				RV	RV		RV				
Old Dominion	C		20	NR			RV	RV	18	NR	RV			25	RV
South Carolina	C		RV												
UAB	C		RV	RV											

=== Results ===
Team/Opponent	CHA	FIU	FAU	KTY	MAR	UNM	ODU	USC	UAB
Charlotte				1–1	1–0		1–2	1–1	
FIU	2–2				4–0	4–0	3–1		
Florida Atlantic	1–3	1–4			2–1		0–3		
Kentucky		2–2	4–0					1–0	1–0
Marshall				1–0		1–2		2–1	2–1
New Mexico	0–0		3–1	0–1					2–0
Old Dominion				2–0	1–0	1–0			3–2
South Carolina		2–5	1–2			2–2	3–2		
UAB	1–1	1–2	2–0					0–1	

== Postseason ==
=== C-USA Tournament ===
Quarterfinals
4	Charlotte	1
5	New Mexico	0
2	Old Dominion	2
7	South Carolina	0
3	Kentucky	0
6	Marshall	1

Semifinals
1	FIU	1
4	Charlotte	3
2	Old Dominion	1
6	Marshall	0

Final
2	Old Dominion	1
4	Charlotte	0

=== NCAA Tournament ===
Seed	Region	School	1st Round	2nd Round	3rd Round	Quarterfinals	Semifinals	Championship
—	Chapel Hill	FIU	W, 2–0 vs. Omaha – (Miami)	L, 1–2 vs. #6 Duke – (Durham)				
—	Bloomington	Old Dominion	W, 2–0 vs. NC State – (Norfolk)	L, 0–3 vs. #2 Indiana – (Bloomington)				

== Awards ==
=== Regular season awards ===
==== Players of the Week ====
Week	Offensive			Defensive			Goalkeeper		Rookie			Ref.
Week	Player	Position	Team	Player	Position	Team	Player	Team	Player	Position	Team	Ref.

=== Postseason awards ===
==== All-C-USA awards and teams ====
2017 C-USA Men's Soccer Individual Awards
Award	Recipient(s)
Player of the Year	Santiago Patino, FIU
Offensive Player of the Year	Aaron Herrera, New Mexico
Defensive Player of the Year	Santiago Patino, FIU
Freshman of the Year	Enrique Facusse, Kentucky
Golden Glove Award	Mertcan Akar, Old Dominion; Enrique Facusse, Kentucky
Coach of the Year	Kevin Nylen, FIU

2017 C-USA Men's Soccer All-Conference Teams
First Team	Second Team	Third Team	Rookie Team
F: Luca Mayr, South Carolina; F: Santiago Patino, FIU; F: Daniel Bruce, Charlotte; MF: Paul Marie, FIU; MF: Joris Ahlinvi, FIU; MF: Tommy Madden, Charlotte; D: Aaron Herrera, New Mexico; D: Alex Bumpus, Kentucky; D: Callum Montgomery, Charlotte; GK: Mertcan Akar, Old Dominion; GK: Enrique Facusse, Kentucky	F: Brandon Perdue, Old Dominion; F: Lewis Knight, Marshall; MF: Niko Klosterhalfen, Old Dominion; MF: David Valverde, UAB; MF: Massimo Ferrin, UAB; D: Chris Wallander-Ianev, South Carolina; D: Tom Smart, New Mexico; D: Fox Slotemaker, Old Dominion; D: Carlos Diaz-Salcedo, Marshall; D: Marvin Hezel, FIU; D: Mathieu Laurent, UAB; GK: Jason Beaulieu, New Mexico	F: JJ Williams, Kentucky; F: Max Wilschrey, Old Dominion; F: Sam Gleadle, New Mexico; MF: Sebastien Hauret, Old Dominion; MF: Aaron Scott, New Mexico; MF: Kevin Barajas, Kentucky; MF: Teddy Chaouche, Charlotte; MF: Donald Tomlinson, FIU; D: Leon Jones, Kentucky; GK: Hugo Fauroux, FIU	Enrique Facusse, Kentucky; Lewis Knight, Marshall; Alessandro Campoy, FIU; Justin Sukow, South Carolina; Brandon Perdue, Old Dominion; Joe Brito, Charlotte; Billy Jones, New Mexico; Ferdinand Solberg, Florida Atlantic; Leon Jones, Kentucky; Matias Barraza, FIU; Aime Mabika, Kentucky; Hans Kroschwitz, Old Dominion; Nick Barreiro, New Mexico

==== All-Americans ====
===== College Soccer News =====
Three players in the conference were named All-Americans by CollegeSoccerNews.com.

- Santiago Patino, FIU — Second team All-American
- Paul Marie, FIU — Third team All-American

===== United Soccer Coaches =====
One player in the conference were named All-Americans by United Soccer Coaches.

- Santiago Patino, FIU — First team All-American

== MLS SuperDraft ==
=== Total picks by school ===
Team	Round 1	Round 2	Round 3	Round 4	Total
Charlotte	0	0	0	0	0
FIU	1	0	0	0	1
Florida Atlantic	0	0	0	0	0
Kentucky	0	0	1	0	0
Marshall	0	0	0	0	0
New Mexico	0	0	0	0	0
Old Dominion	0	0	0	0	0
South Carolina	0	0	0	0	0
UAB	0	0	0	0	0

=== List of selections ===
Round	Pick #	MLS team	Player	Position	College	Ref.
1	12	San Jose Earthquakes	(France) Paul Marie	Midfielder	FIU	
3	52	New York City FC	(United States) Alex Bumpus	Defender	Kentucky	

=== Homegrown contracts ===
Original MLS team	Player	Position	College	Notes	Ref.
Montreal Impact	Jason Beaulieu	Goalkeeper	New Mexico		
Real Salt Lake	Aaron Herrera	Defender	New Mexico	2017 C-USA Defender of the Year	

== See also ==
- 2017 NCAA Division I men's soccer season
- 2017 Conference USA women's soccer season
