= 2016 Conference USA men's soccer season =

- League: NCAA Division I
- Sport: Soccer
- Duration: August, 2016 – November, 2016
- Teams: 9

2017 MLS SuperDraft
- Top draft pick: Niko Hansen, New Mexico
- Picked by: Columbus Crew, 9th overall

Regular season
- Season champions: Charlotte
- Runners-up: South Carolina
- Season MVP: Brandt Bronico
- Top scorer: Brandt Bronico

Tournament
- Champions: New Mexico
- Runners-up: FIU
- Finals MVP: Chris Wehan

Conference USA men's soccer seasons
- ← 2015 2017 →

2016 Conference USA men's soccer standings
	Conf.					Overall
Team	W		L		T	W		L		T
No. 16 Charlotte +	7	–	1	–	0	12	–	4	–	2
South Carolina +	5	–	2	–	1	11	–	8	–	1
Fla. International	5	–	2	–	1	10	–	7	–	2
No. 23 Kentucky +	5	–	3	–	0	11	–	5	–	3
New Mexico ‡	4	–	3	–	1	12	–	7	–	3
UAB	2	–	5	–	1	6	–	9	–	3
Old Dominion	2	–	5	–	1	6	–	9	–	2
Florida Atlantic	2	–	6	–	0	4	–	10	–	1
Marshall	1	–	6	–	1	6	–	11	–	1
‡-Tournament champion +- Invited to the NCAA Division I Men's Soccer Championship; As of 13 December 2016; Rankings from NSCAA

The 2016 Conference USA men's soccer season was the 22nd season of men's varsity soccer in the conference.

The FIU Panthers are both the defending conference tournament champions. The Kentucky Wildcats are the defending regular season champions.

== Changes from 2015 ==
- None

== Teams ==
=== Stadiums and locations ===
Team	Location	Stadium	Capacity
Charlotte 49ers	Charlotte, North Carolina	Transamerica Field	7,500
FIU Panthers	Miami, Florida	FIU Soccer Stadium	2,700
Florida Atlantic Owls	Boca Raton, Florida	FAU Soccer Stadium	300
Kentucky Wildcats	Lexington, Kentucky	UK Soccer Complex	3,000
Marshall Thundering Herd	Huntington, West Virginia	Veterans Memorial Soccer Complex	1,006
New Mexico Lobos	Albuquerque, New Mexico	Lobo Soccer/Track Complex	5,000
Old Dominion Monarchs	Norfolk, Virginia	Old Dominion Soccer Complex	2,500
South Carolina Gamecocks	Columbia, South Carolina	Stone Stadium	5,700
UAB Blazers	Birmingham, Alabama	West Campus Field	2,500

- Louisiana Tech, Middle Tennessee State, North Texas, Rice, Southern Miss, UTEP, UTSA and WKU do not sponsor men's soccer. Kentucky, New Mexico and South Carolina are associated members.

== Regular season ==
=== Results ===
Team/opponent	CHA	FIU	FAU	UK	MAR	UNM	ODU	USC	UAB
Charlotte 49ers							2–0		
FIU Panthers				2–1					
Florida Atlantic Owls								0–1	
Kentucky Wildcats		1–2							
Marshall Thundering Herd									0–3
New Mexico Lobos									
Old Dominion Monarchs	0–2								
South Carolina Gamecocks			1–0						
UAB Blazers					3–0				

=== Rankings ===
Legend
Increase in ranking
Decrease in ranking
Not ranked previous week

		Pre	Wk 1	Wk 2	Wk 3	Wk 4	Wk 5	Wk 6	Wk 7	Wk 8	Wk 9	Wk 10	Wk 11	Wk 12	Final
Charlotte	C	22	19	9	9	5	14	17	14	9	8	5	5	9	16
FIU	C	23	NR			RV	NR								
Florida Atlantic	C														
Kentucky	C		17	16	21	RV	20	15	20	18	14	12	19	18	23
Marshall	C														
New Mexico	C				RV	21	RV	RV	RV	RV	RV	RV	RV	22	RV
Old Dominion	C			RV	NR										
South Carolina	C	24	RV	RV	NR			RV	RV	RV	25	RV	RV	RV	RV
UAB	C														

== Postseason ==
=== CUSA tournament ===
New Mexico won their first Conference USA tournament, defeating the defending champions, FIU in the final.

Quarterfinals
4	Kentucky	2 (1)
5	New Mexico (pen.)	2 (2)
2	South Carolina	1
7	Old Dominion	2
3	FIU	2
6	UAB	1

Semifinals
1	Charlotte	1
5	New Mexico	2
7	Old Dominion	0
3	FIU	2

Final
5	New Mexico	3
3	FIU	0

=== NCAA tournament ===
Seed	Region	School	1st round	2nd round	3rd round	Quarterfinals	Semifinals	Championship
10	2	Charlotte	BYE	L, 2–3 vs. Virginia Tech – (Charlotte)				
16	1	Kentucky	BYE	L, 2–3 vs. Creighton – (Lexington)				
—	3	New Mexico	T, 1–1 (W, 6–5 pen.) vs. Portland – (Albuquerque)	L, 1–4 vs. Washington – (Seattle)				
—	3	South Carolina	W 1–0 vs. Mercer – (Columbia)	L, 1–2 ^{OT} vs. Clemson – (Clemson)				

== All-CUSA awards and teams ==
2016 C-USA Men's Soccer Individual Awards
Award	Recipient(s)
Player of the Year	Brandt Bronico, Charlotte
Offensive MVP	Brandt Bronico, Charlotte
Defensive MVP	Luke Waechter, Charlotte
Coach of the Year	Kevin Langan, Charlotte
Freshman of the Year	Elliot Panicco, Charlotte

2016 C-USA Men's Soccer All-Conference Teams
First Team	Second Team	Third Team	Freshman Team
F: Santiago Patiño, FIU; F: Niko Hansen, New Mexico; F: Danny Deakin, South Carolina; MF: Brandt Bronico, Charlotte; MF: Paul Marie, FIU; MF: Napo Matsoso, Kentucky; MF: Chris Wehan, New Mexico; D: Matej Dekovic, Charlotte; D: Luke Waechter, Charlotte; D: Jordan Wilson, Kentucky; GK: Elliot Panicco, Charlotte	F: Luis Betancur, FIU; F: Jason Fitzgerald, Florida Atlantic; F: Bjorn Gudjonsson, South Carolina; MF: Trevor Starcher, Marshall; MF: Jesse Miralrio, Old Dominion; MF: Cole Stringer, Old Dominion; MF: Kurtis Turner, South Carolina; MF: David Valverde, UAB; D: Charlie Reymann, Kentucky; D: Tom Smart, New Mexico; GK: Joe Kuzminsky, UAB	MF: Maxi Rodriguez, Charlotte; MF: Donald Tomlinson, FIU; MF: Chris Gurule, New Mexico; MF: Niko Klosterhalfen, Old Dominion; MF: Julian Veen Uldal, South Carolina; MF: Koty Millard, South Carolina; D: Juan Benedetty, FIU; D: Alex Bumpus, Kentucky; D: Arthur Duchesne, Marshall; D: Peyton Ericson, South Carolina; D: Ive Burnett, South Carolina; D: William White, UAB; GK: William Pyle, South Carolina	Elliot Panicco, GK, Charlotte; Ryan Spaulding, MF, Charlotte; David Longo, D, FIU; Joris Ahlinvi, F, FIU; JJ Williams, F, Kentucky; Connor Probert, F, Kentucky; Tom Smart, D, New Mexico; Matt Constant, D, New Mexico; Sebastian Hauret, MF, Old Dominion; Julian Veen Uldal, MF, South Carolina; Luca Mayr, F, South Carolina; Eder Mora, MF, UAB; Massimo Ferrin, F, UAB

== See also ==
- 2016 NCAA Division I men's soccer season
- 2016 Conference USA Men's Soccer Tournament
- 2016 Conference USA women's soccer season
