= 2006 Conference USA men's soccer tournament =

2006 C-USA men's soccer tournament
Tournament details
- Country: United States
- Dates: 1–5 November 2006
- Teams: 8

Final positions
- Champions: SMU (1st title)
- Runners-up: Kentucky

Tournament statistics
- Matches played: 7
- Goals scored: 27 (3.86 per match)
- Top goal scorer: 6 players (2 goals)

The 2006 Conference USA men's soccer tournament was the twelfth edition of the Conference USA Men's Soccer Tournament. The tournament decided the Conference USA champion and guaranteed representative into the 2006 NCAA Division I Men's Soccer Championship. The tournament was hosted by the University of Tulsa and the games were played at the Hurricane Soccer & Track Stadium.

== Bracket ==
Quarterfinals; Wednesday Nov. 1
8	FIU	0
1	SMU	6
5	UAB	3
4	South Carolina	2
7	Memphis	1
2	Kentucky	3
6	UCF	0
3	Tulsa	5

Semifinals; Friday Nov. 3
1	SMU	1(3)
5	UAB	1(1)
2	Kentucky	3
3	Tulsa	0

Final; Sunday Nov. 5
1	SMU	2
2	Kentucky	0

== Schedule ==
=== Quarterfinals ===
November 1 Match 1	FIU	0–6	SMU	Tulsa, Oklahoma
12:00 PM CST (UTC-06)		Report	Guarda 21'; Da Silva 30'; Needham 35'; Mariel 75', 89'; Mann 81'	Stadium: Hurricane Soccer & Track Stadium; Attendance: 781; Referee: Paul Hooks

November 1 Match 2	UAB	3–2	South Carolina	Tulsa, Oklahoma
2:30 PM CST (UTC-06)	Biggs 38'; Gregory 54'; Monteiro 90'	Report	Sambursky 15'; Pace 44'	Stadium: Hurricane Soccer & Track Stadium; Attendance: 102; Referee: Abdu Bensalah

November 1 Match 3	Memphis	1–3	Kentucky	Tulsa, Oklahoma
5:30 PM CST (UTC-06)	Harkins 19'	Report	D'Agostino 31'; O'Neill 64', 71'	Stadium: Hurricane Soccer & Track Stadium; Attendance: 160; Referee: Rizal Milliken

November 1 Match 4	UCF	0–5	Tulsa	Tulsa, Oklahoma
8:00 PM CST (UTC-06)		Report	Salem 25'; Parada 35'; Defreitas 53'; Goddard 63', 73'	Stadium: Hurricane Soccer & Track Stadium; Attendance: 235; Referee: Tony DeLois

=== Semifinals ===
November 3 Match 5	SMU	1–1 (a.e.t.) (3–1 p)	UAB	Tulsa, Oklahoma
5:00 PM CST (UTC-06)	Da Silva 69'	Report	Monteiro 58'	Stadium: Hurricane Soccer & Track Stadium; Attendance: 232; Referee: Kenneth Andres
	Penalties
	Gonzalez (penalty scored); Wileman (penalty scored); Da Silva (penalty scored)		(penalty missed) Kwapisz; (penalty missed) Monteiro; (penalty scored) Radcliffe; (penalty missed) Schiavoni

November 3 Match 6	Kentucky	3–0	Tulsa	Tulsa, Oklahoma
7:30 PM CST (UTC-06)	Griffiths 11', 85'; Baum 68'	Report		Stadium: Hurricane Soccer & Track Stadium; Attendance: 545; Referee: Abdu Bensalah

=== Final ===
November 5 Match 7	SMU	2–0	Kentucky	Tulsa, Oklahoma
1:00 PM CST (UTC-06)	Wileman 42'; Chevannes 64'	Report		Stadium: Hurricane Soccer & Track Stadium; Attendance: 225; Referee: Lou Labbadia

== Statistics ==
=== Goalscorers ===
Rank	Player	Team	Goals
1	Jase Griffiths	Kentucky	2
1	Riley O'Neill	Kentucky	2
1	Paulo Da Silva	SMU	2
1	Manuel Mariel	SMU	2
1	Todd Goddard	Tulsa	2
1	Jerson Monteiro	UAB	2
7	Mathew Baum	Kentucky	1
7	Michael D'Agostino	Kentucky	1
7	Tripp Harkins	Memphis	1
7	Adrian Chevannes	SMU	1
7	Bruno Guarda	SMU	1
7	Jordan Mann	SMU	1
7	Jay Needham	SMU	1
7	Chase Wileman	SMU	1
7	Ralph Pace	South Carolina	1
7	Mike Sambursky	South Carolina	1
7	Eric Defreitas	Tulsa	1
7	Jose Parada	Tulsa	1
7	Joe Salem	Tulsa	1
7	Michael Biggs	UAB	1
7	Trey Gregory	UAB	1

== Awards ==
=== All-Tournament team ===
- Barry Rice, Kentucky
- Masumi Turnbull, Kentucky
- Matt Wiler, Kentucky
- Paulo da Silva, SMU
- Bruno Guarda, SMU
- Jay Needham, SMU
- Matt Wideman, SMU
- Eric Burkholder, Tulsa
- Eric DeFreitas, Tulsa
- Trey Gregory, UAB
- Jerson Monteiro, UAB
