= 2016 Conference USA men's soccer tournament =

- Classification: Division I
- Teams: 7
- Matches: 6
- Site: Veterans Memorial Soccer Complex; Huntington, West Virginia
- Champions: New Mexico (1st title)
- Winning coach: Jeremy Fishbein (1st title)
- Broadcast: ESPN3

2016 Conference USA men's soccer standings
	Conf.					Overall
Team	W		L		T	W		L		T
No. 16 Charlotte +	7	–	1	–	0	12	–	4	–	2
South Carolina +	5	–	2	–	1	11	–	8	–	1
Fla. International	5	–	2	–	1	10	–	7	–	2
No. 23 Kentucky +	5	–	3	–	0	11	–	5	–	3
New Mexico ‡	4	–	3	–	1	12	–	7	–	3
UAB	2	–	5	–	1	6	–	9	–	3
Old Dominion	2	–	5	–	1	6	–	9	–	2
Florida Atlantic	2	–	6	–	0	4	–	10	–	1
Marshall	1	–	6	–	1	6	–	11	–	1
‡-Tournament champion +- Invited to the NCAA Division I Men's Soccer Championship; As of 13 December 2016; Rankings from NSCAA

The 2016 Conference USA men's soccer tournament, was the 22nd edition of the tournament. It determined Conference USA's automatic berth into the 2016 NCAA Division I Men's Soccer Championship.

New Mexico won the CUSA title, making it their first CUSA championship. The Lobos defeated FIU in the championship, 3–0.

== Seeding ==
The top seven programs qualified for the CUSA Tournament.

No.	School	W	L	T	PCT.	Pts.
1	Charlotte	7	1	0	.875	21
2	South Carolina	5	2	1	.688	16
3	FIU	5	2	1	.688	16
4	Kentucky	5	3	0	.625	15
5	New Mexico	4	3	1	.563	13
6	UAB	2	5	1	.313	7
7	Old Dominion	2	5	1	.313	7

== Bracket ==
Quarterfinals
4	Kentucky	2 (1)
5	New Mexico (pen.)	2 (2)
2	South Carolina	1
7	Old Dominion	2
3	FIU	2
6	UAB	1

Semifinals
1	Charlotte	1
5	New Mexico	2
7	Old Dominion	0
3	FIU	2

Final
5	New Mexico	3
3	FIU	0

== Awards ==
**CUSA Men’s Soccer All-Tournament team**

**Chris Wehan**, New Mexico
**Chris Gurule**, New Mexico
Niko Hansen, New Mexico
Nick Rochowski, New Mexico
Joris Ahlinvi, FIU
Ismael Longo, FIU
Paul Marie, FIU
Brandt Bronico, Charlotte
Tommy Madden, Charlotte
Cole Stringer, Old Dominion
Christian Wirth, Old Dominion

MVP's in Bold
