= Niko Hansen =

Danish-American professional soccer player (born 1994)

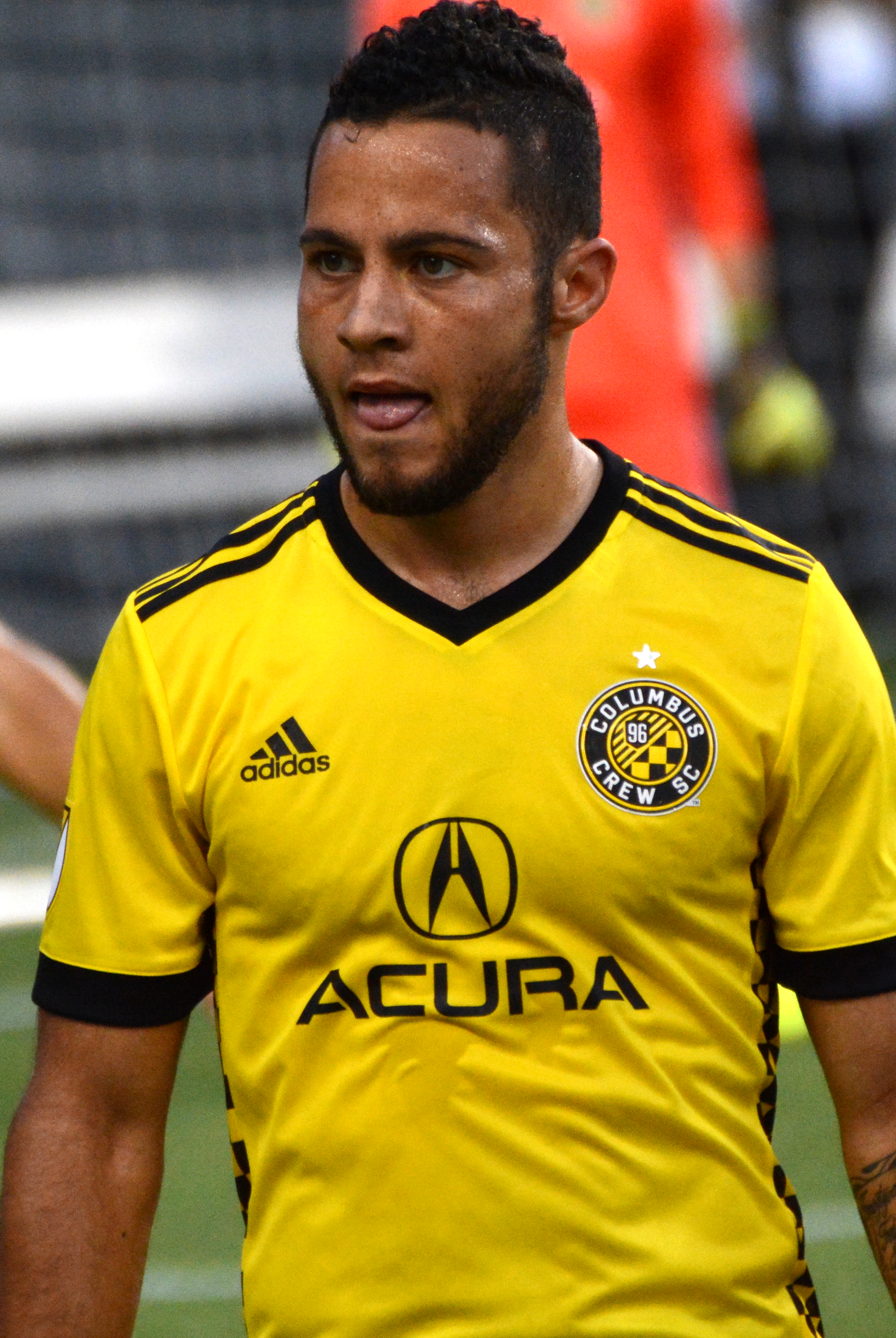
- Hansen with Columbus Crew SC in 2017

Personal information
- Full name: Nikolaj Hansen
- Date of birth: 14 September 1994 (age 32)
- Place of birth: Randers, Denmark
- Height: 1.78 m (5 ft 10 in)
- Positions: Winger; forward

Youth career
- –2011: Davis Legacy
- 2011–2012: Placer United

College career
Years	Team	Apps	(Gls)
2013–2016	New Mexico Lobos	79	(28)

Senior career*
Years	Team	Apps	(Gls)
2014	Seattle Sounders FC U-23	9	(2)
2017–2019	Columbus Crew SC	45	(4)
2019–2020	Houston Dynamo	21	(2)
2021–2022	Minnesota United	17	(1)
2022	Minnesota United 2	6	(2)
2023	San Antonio FC	14	(2)
- * Club domestic league appearances and goals as of 19:58, 25 October 2023 (UTC)

Nikolaj Hansen (born 14 September 1994) is a Danish retired footballer who played as a winger or forward. He previously appeared at the semi-professional level for Seattle Sounders FC U-23 and professionally with Columbus Crew SC, Houston Dynamo, Minnesota United and San Antonio FC.

At a young age, Hansen moved to the United States and attended Jesuit High School. He played in college at New Mexico, appearing on an all-conference team in each of his four years with the Lobos and winning two conference titles. He also appeared with Seattle Sounders FC U-23 during the collegiate offseason. Hansen was selected by Columbus Crew SC in the first round of the 2017 MLS SuperDraft; he scored on his professional debut that March. He is eligible to play for either the Denmark or United States national teams and is a citizen of both countries.

== Early life ==
Born in Randers, Denmark, Hansen grew up in Oksbøl before moving to the United States at the age of 10. His family settled in Sacramento, California, where he attended Jesuit High School. As a senior, he scored 35 goals for the Marauders and was named as an NSCAA High School All-American. Hansen was also selected to take part in the NSCAA High School All-American Game.

Hansen played club soccer with Davis Legacy, where he was teammates with Ahkello Witherspoon, and with Placer United during his time in California. He committed to play college soccer for coach Jeremy Fishbein and the New Mexico Lobos.

== College and amateur ==
On 6 February 2013, Hansen was officially confirmed as part of the New Mexico roster, one of eight recruits brought in by the Lobos ahead of the 2013 season. He made his collegiate debut on 31 August, starting and scoring two goals as part of a 7–2 victory over Villanova. Hansen also scored on his Conference USA (C-USA) debut, tallying a goal in a 3–1 victory over Marshall, and notched an assist in his NCAA Tournament debut against George Mason. Finishing the season with seven goals and five assists in 22 appearances, he was named to the C-USA All-Freshman Team. As a sophomore, Hansen appeared 18 times and scored five goals. In one mid-season stretch, he scored three match-winning goals in four games: against Virginia Commonwealth, West Virginia, and Florida International. At the end of the season, he was named to the All-CUSA Third Team.

Ahead of his junior season, Hansen was called up to the United States U23 national team, taking part in a college identification training camp ahead of the 2015 CONCACAF Men's Olympic Qualifying Championship. He stepped straight back into form after returning to New Mexico, scoring goals in back-to-back matches against Missouri State and American in September. He scored just one more time on the season, but was named Second Team All-CUSA, with a total of three goals and three assists from 18 appearances. As a senior, Hansen appeared 21 times while leading the Lobos to their first C-USA tournament title since joining the conference four years prior. On 17 September, he scored his first career hat trick in a 3–1 victory over UC Irvine. Hansen tallied a career-high 13 goals during the year, earned a spot on the C-USA All-Tournament Team, and was named to the All-CUSA First Team. He finished his collegiate career with 28 goals in 79 appearances.

=== Seattle Sounders FC U-23 ===
Following his freshman season at New Mexico, Hansen played for Seattle Sounders FC U-23 in the Premier Development League. He made his debut for the club on 16 May in a season-opening defeat against Lane United. Two weeks later, Hansen added his first Sounders FC U-23 goal, a 54th-minute tally in a 3–0 victory over Vancouver Whitecaps FC U-23. After tacking on another goal in mid-June, Hansen finished the campaign with two goals and an assist in his lone season with Seattle.

== Club career ==
=== Columbus Crew SC ===
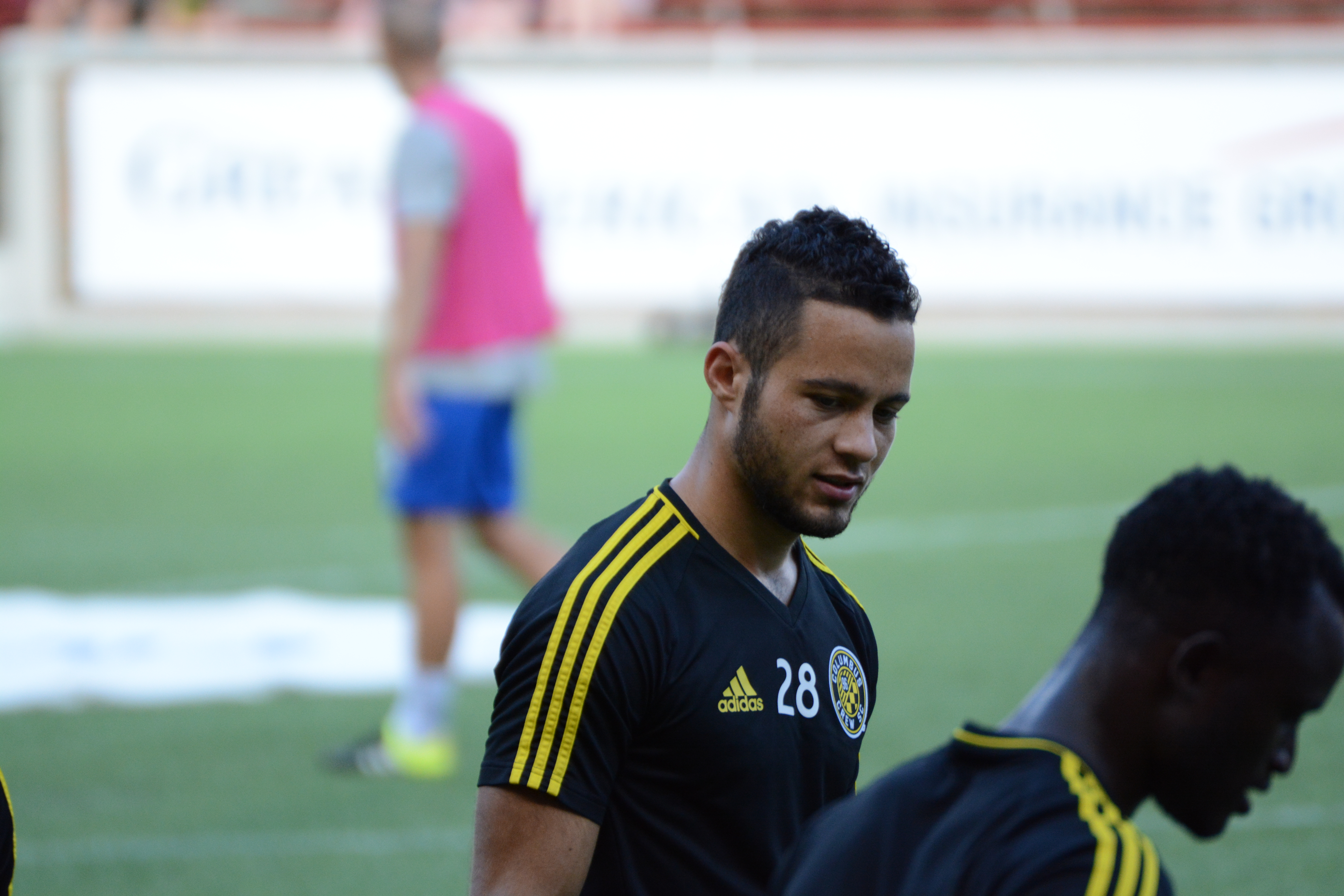
Hansen was the second-ever New Mexico player drafted by Columbus, following Brandon Moss in 2006.

Columbus Crew SC selected Hansen with the ninth overall pick in the 2017 MLS SuperDraft. Because he had already signed a league-guaranteed contract before the draft, he was automatically added to the Columbus roster without having to negotiate a contract with the club. Hansen made his club and professional debut on 25 March against Portland Timbers, replacing Justin Meram in the 60th minute of a tied match. He went on to provide Crew SC with a 3–2 victory, scoring the game-winning goal in the 84th minute. Hansen missed 14 matches during the summer after undergoing surgery to repair an inguinal hernia and then suffering a thigh strain upon his return to training. He returned in time for Columbus' playoff run, appearing as an extra time substitute in the knockout round against Atlanta United. He scored in the penalty shootout as Crew SC advanced by a 3–1 margin. After finishing the season with one goal in 16 appearances, Hansen had his contract option picked up by the club.

Hansen was expected to challenge for a starting spot at the beginning of the 2018 season following the departure of Justin Meram, but suffered a pulled hamstring during preseason camp. He found his form in the later part of the year, scoring a match-tying goal against Chicago Fire on 23 August and bagging a brace in a 3–2 defeat against Portland on 19 September. For a second consecutive season, Hansen scored in a knockout round penalty shootout, this time helping Columbus advance over D.C. United by a 3–2 result. However, he missed the conference semifinals against New York Red Bulls after picking up an ankle injury against D.C. After appearing 24 times and scoring three goals, Hansen again had his contract option picked up by the club.

Following the 2018 season, Hansen had surgery on his ankle; during the 2019 preseason, he suffered two setbacks, tearing scar tissue in the same ankle then suffering a torn hamstring in his preseason debut. He returned to full health after missing five league matches, appearing off the bench on 6 April against New England Revolution. He struggled to earn a spot in the rotation under new head coach Caleb Porter, appearing in just nine matches under Porter. Hansen was traded to Houston in early August, ending his time in Columbus with four goals from 49 appearances in all competitions.

"I won’t try to be something that I’m not. I’m physical, I’m quick, I want to get behind the lines and I want to be direct and try to score goals and get crosses...I want to come in and make a difference."

— Hansen, speaking about himself in 2019

=== Houston Dynamo ===
On 8 August 2019, Hansen was traded to Houston Dynamo in exchange for $75,000 in targeted allocation money. He made his debut for the Dynamo three days later, entering as a substitute in a 2–1 defeat against Philadelphia Union, and went on to make four appearances during his first season in Houston. Following the campaign, the Dynamo picked up the option on Hansen's contract.

At the beginning of the 2020 season, Hansen made one substitute appearance before the season was halted due to the COVID-19 pandemic. He played just one time in the MLS is Back Tournament, but became a regular part of the rotation once the regular season resumed, appearing in all but three games the rest of the way. Hansen scored his first Dynamo goal on 25 August and added an assist as part of a 5–2 victory against Sporting Kansas City. After scoring in October against Minnesota United, he finished the season with two goals from 17 appearances. His contract expired following the season, but Hansen was extended a contract offer and was protected by the Dynamo ahead of the 2020 MLS Expansion Draft. He opted out of the 2020 MLS Re-Entry Draft.

=== Minnesota United ===
After failing to reach an agreement with the Dynamo on a new deal, Hansen was traded to Minnesota United on 18 March 2021 in exchange for $125,000 in general allocation money. He signed a two-year contract, with the Loons holding an option for a third year. Hansen starred in preseason, tying for the team lead in goals with four. However, he then suffered a left thigh injury that ruled him out for the first six games of the season. Hansen made his club debut on 29 May, entering the match against Real Salt Lake as a substitute. He promptly scored in the 78th minute, earning the Loons a 1–1 draw. He was a consistent feature in the lineup through the summer, but then suffered a groin injury in mid-August that cost him another seven games. Hansen played just five times during the remainder of the season, although one of those came in the first round of the 2021 MLS Cup Playoffs against Portland Timbers. He concluded his first year in Minnesota with one goal and one assist from 13 total appearances. Following the 2022 season, his contract option was declined by Minnesota.

=== San Antonio FC ===
On 11 January 2023, Hansen signed with USL Championship side San Antonio FC on a one-year deal.

== Career statistics ==
As of 17 September 2022

Appearances and goals by club, season and competition
Club	Season	League			Cup (Note: All appearances in the U.S. Open Cup)		Continental		Other		Total	
Club	Season	Division	Apps	Goals	Apps	Goals	Apps	Goals	Apps	Goals	Apps	Goals
Seattle Sounders FC U-23	2014	PDL	9	2	—		—		—		9	2
Columbus Crew SC	2017	MLS	14	1	1	0	—		1 (Note: Appearance(s) in the MLS Cup Playoffs)	0	16	1
Columbus Crew SC	2018	MLS	22	3	1	0	—		1	0	24	3
Columbus Crew SC	2019	MLS	9	0	0	0	—		—		9	0
Columbus Crew SC	Total		45	4	2	0	0	0	2	0	49	4
Houston Dynamo	2019	MLS	4	0	0	0	0	0	—		4	0
Houston Dynamo	2020	MLS	17	2	—		—		—		17	2
Houston Dynamo	Total		21	2	0	0	0	0	0	0	21	2
Minnesota United	2021	MLS	12	1	—		—		1	0	13	1
Minnesota United	2022	MLS	5	0	2	0	—		0	0	7	0
Minnesota United	Total		17	1	2	0	0	0	1	0	20	1
Minnesota United 2	2022	MLS Next Pro	6	2	—		—		—		6	2
San Antonio FC	2023	USL Championship	0	0	0	0	—		0	0	0	0
Career total			98	11	4	0	0	0	3	0	105	11

== Honors ==
New Mexico

- Conference USA (regular season): 2013
- Conference USA Men's Soccer Tournament: 2016

Individual

- C-USA All-Freshman Team: 2013
- Third Team All-CUSA: 2014
- Second Team All-CUSA: 2015
- First Team All-CUSA: 2016
- C-USA All Tournament Team: 2016
- NSCAA All-Southwest Region First Team: 2016

== See also ==
- All-time Columbus Crew roster
- All-time Houston Dynamo roster
- List of Minnesota United FC players
- List of Danish Americans
- List of foreign MLS players
