= Elliot Panicco =

American soccer player

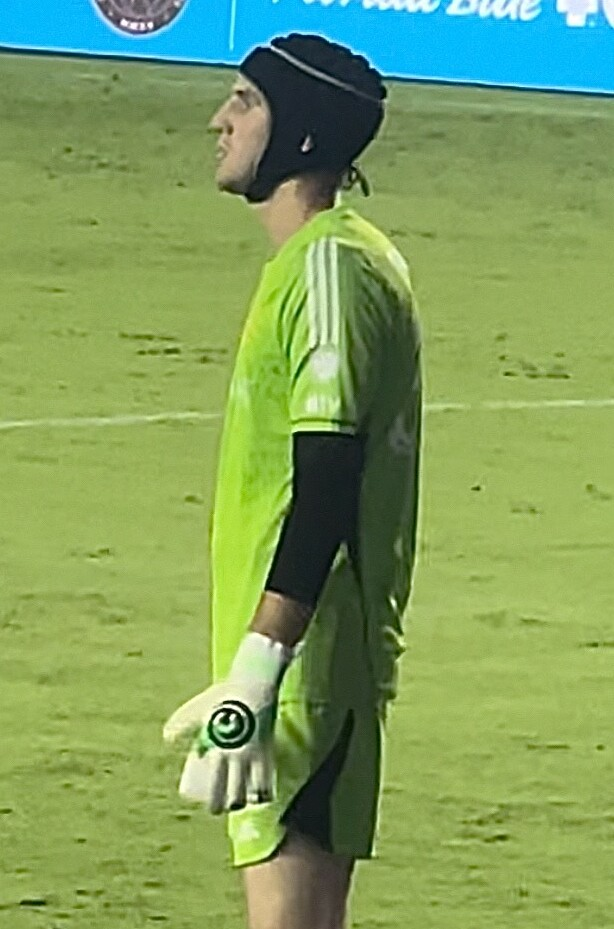
- Panicco with Nashville SC in 2023

Personal information
- Full name: Elliot Joseph Panicco
- Date of birth: November 18, 1996 (age 29)
- Place of birth: Paducah, Kentucky, United States
- Height: 6 ft 5 in (1.96 m)
- Position: Goalkeeper

Youth career
- 2011–2013: Hough Huskies
- 2013–2014: Carolina Rapids

College career
Years	Team	Apps	(Gls)
2015–2019	Charlotte 49ers	77	(0)

Senior career*
Years	Team	Apps	(Gls)
2020–2024	Nashville SC	10	(0)
2021	→ Austin Bold (loan)	28	(0)
2022	→ Indy Eleven (loan)	10	(0)
2023–2024	→ Huntsville City FC	7	(0)
- * Club domestic league appearances and goals as of October 23, 2024

Elliot Joseph Panicco (born November 18, 1996) is an American professional soccer player who plays as a goalkeeper.

== Career ==
=== Youth and college ===
In December 2014, Panicco graduated high school early and enrolled at UNC Charlotte during the Spring 2015 semester. Panicco played with the men's soccer team during their spring 2015 exhibitions. During the 2015 NCAA Division I men's soccer season, his freshman year, Panicco was redshirted for the season. Starting his sophomore year, Panicco became a four-year starter for the 49ers program, amassing a total of 77 appearances for the team, as well as earning one assist during his college career.

Panicco made his college soccer debut on August 29, 2016, in a 6–0 victory against Hofstra, where he would record his first career shutout, and make four saves during the match. Panicco would then go on to register three consecutive shutouts following the victory over Hofstra. On September 17, 2016, during a conference slate against Old Dominion, Panicco would register his first, and only, collegiate assist, helping Charlotte prevail to a 2–0 victory. In total, Panicco made eight shutouts during his freshman campaign. He finished the 2016 season with a goalkeeping record of 12–4–2. Concluding the 2016 Conference USA men's soccer season, Panicco was named the Conference USA Men's Soccer Freshman of the Year and named to the Conference USA All-First Team.

In 2017, in his second year, Panicco helped Charlotte reach the championship match of the 2017 Conference USA Men's Soccer Tournament, where they ultimately lost to Old Dominion. In his third-year, Panicco won the Conference USA Golden Glove Award and was featured twice on the TopDrawerSoccer.com national team of the week. Panicco was also named to the NCCSIA All-State Team. In his senior season, Panicco won the Senior CLASS Award for men's soccer.

=== Professional ===
==== Nashville SC ====
On January 9, 2020, Panicco was selected 13th overall in the 2020 MLS SuperDraft by Nashville SC after the team traded up for the pick. Panicco signed with Nashville on February 25, 2020. He was waived by Nashville on January 9, 2025.

==== Austin Bold (loan) ====
Pannico was loaned to USL Championship side Austin Bold on May 6, 2021, alongside Nashville SC teammate Nick Hinds. He made his professional debut for the club on May 21, 2021, in a 1–1 draw against Real Monarchs.

== Honors ==
Individual

- Senior CLASS Award: 2019

David Schlee Memorial Award: 2017 Conference USA Golden Glove: 2019

- Conference USA Golden Glove: 2018

Conference USA Golden Glove: 2016

- Conference USA Men's Soccer Freshman of the Year: 2016

All Conference USA 1st Team: 2019 All Conference USA 1st Team: 2018 All Conference USA 1st Team: 2016 All Conference USA Freshman Team: 2016
