= MPSF men's soccer tournament =

MPSF men's soccer tournament (defunct)
- Conference soccer championship
- Sport: Soccer
- Conference: MPSF
- Number of teams: 4
- Format: Single-elimination
- Played: 1992–2012
- Current champion: Air Force (1st. title)
- Most championships: New Mexico (2 titles)

The Mountain Pacific Sports Federation (MPSF) men's soccer tournament was the conference championship tournament in men's college soccer for the Mountain Pacific Sports Federation. The tournament was held annually between 2009 and 2012. The conference was disbanded when MPSF membership ended in favor of teams joining the Western Athletic Conference.

== History ==
The MPSF was founded in 1992 and specifically created to provide an outlet for competition in non-revenue-producing Olympic sports, particularly for institutions in the Western United States. At the time of the foundation, several prominent western conference, such as the Western Athletic Conference and the Pac-12 Conference did not sponsor men's soccer as an NCAA varsity sport. This allowed the MPSF to provide conference competition to Western teams to ease travel, provide a competitive environment, as well as provide an outlet for a direct berth into the NCAA Division I Men's Soccer Championship.

For the first 20 years of the program's existence, the regular season winner was also crowned the MPSF champion. It was not until 2009 that a tournament itself was established culminating the regular season. Membership throughout the years changed when the Pac-12 began sponsoring men's soccer in 2000. When the WAC began sponsoring men's soccer in 2013, the MPSF dwindled to three members, suspending the conference's sponsorship of the sport.

== List of champions ==
The following is a list of MPSF Tournament winners:

=== Finals ===
Key

- (1) – Title number
- a.e.t. – Match went to extra time
- p – Match decided by a penalty shootout after extra time
- – Team won regular season

=== Finals ===
Ed.	Year	Champion	Score	Runner-up	Venue	City	MVP	Ref.
1	2009	Sacramento State (1)	2–2 (5–4 p)	New Mexico	CIBER Field	Denver, CO	n/a	
2	2010	Sacramento State (2)	2–1 (a.e.t.)	Cal State Bakersfield	Hornet Field	Sacramento, CA	n/a	
3	2011	New Mexico (1)	1–1 (3–1 p)	Cal State Bakersfield	CIBER Field	Denver, CO	Victor Rodriguez (UNM)	
4	2012	Air Force (1)	1–1 (5–3 p)	New Mexico	UNM Soccer Complex	Albuquerque, NM	Kevin Durr (AF)	

== Regular season winners ==
From 1992 until 2008, the MPSF champion was crowned to the team with the best regular season record.

Year	Champion
1992	Washington (1)
1993	UCLA (1)
1994	Fresno State (1)
1995	UCLA (2)
1996	UCLA (3)
1997	UCLA (4)
1998	Washington (2)
1999	Washington (3)
2000	San Jose State (1)

Year	Champion
2001	New Mexico (1)
2002	New Mexico (2)
2003	San Jose State (2)
2004	New Mexico (3)
2005	New Mexico (4)
2006	New Mexico (5)
2007	New Mexico (6)
2008	Denver (1)
