= Randolph School =

Prep school in Huntsville, Alabama, US

Location
- 1005 Drake Avenue Southeast; Huntsville, Alabama 35802; United States; 34°42′22″N 86°33′29″W

Information
- Type: Private college preparatory
- Motto: Diligentes Ad Veritatem Quaerendam (Diligent in Seeking Truth)
- Established: 1959 (67 years ago)
- CEEB code: 011475
- Head of school: Adam Dubé
- Faculty: 150
- Enrollment: 967 (2016)
- Average class size: 13 students
- Student to teacher ratio: 8:1
- Campus size: 67 acres (27 ha)
- Campus type: Suburban
- Colors: Blue, white, and gray
- Slogan: Seeking Truth. Building Character. Nurturing all.
- Team name: Raiders
- Endowment: $32 Million
- School fees: $26,140
- Graduates: 2600+
- Website: www.randolphschool.net

Randolph School is an American independent private Pre-K-through-12th-grade college preparatory school chartered in 1959 in Huntsville, Madison County, Alabama. It started in a home on Randolph Avenue in downtown Huntsville with a handful of elementary classes. A few years later it moved to a much larger 17-acre (6.9 ha) campus on Drake Avenue, where it is now located, gradually adding grade levels until having a graduating high school class in the early 1970s.

In 1998, the school purchased 50 acres (20 ha) of land on Garth Road, less than 1 mile (1.6 km) from the Drake Avenue campus. The new high school opened for the 2009–2010 school year. For the fine arts, the new facilities include a new theater with stadium seating, a workshop for stagecraft, band and choral rooms, and new restroom facilities. In total, Randolph has two gymnasiums, four tennis courts, two practice fields and professionally maintained fields for football, baseball, softball and soccer.

== Athletics ==
Randolph School athletic teams have won 51 AHSAA state titles and finished as runners up 51 times. Randolph athletes have also taken home 24 individuals state titles. Most varsity teams currently compete in the AHSAA 4A division. The Randolph boys have won the Cross Country State Championships in 1982, as well as 2005–2013, setting a new state record for most consecutive state championship wins in Alabama with 9. They were runners up in 2014 and 2018. The girls Cross Country team won in 1978, 1979, 1980, 1996, and 1998, and were runners-up in 2013, 2014 and 2015.

== Notable alumni ==
Its alumni include many of the children of the German rocket scientists who moved to Huntsville with Wernher von Braun after World War II. Other notable alumni include:

- Alex Clay – Former professional soccer player for New York Red Bulls II
- Macon Phillips – White House Director of Digital Strategy in the Obama administration
- Susanna Phillips (graduated 1999) – Soprano opera singer at the Metropolitan Opera in New York City
- Brian Reynolds (game designer) – Chief Game Designer for Zynga, co-founder of Firaxis and Big Huge Games
- Bryan Shelton – Florida Gators men's tennis head coach and six-time Wimbledon participant
- Jimmy Wales – Co-founder of Wikipedia
