= 2017 Conference USA men's soccer tournament =

- Classification: Division I
- Teams: 7
- Matches: 6
- Site: ODU Soccer Complex; Norfolk, Virginia
- Champions: Old Dominion (2nd title)
- Winning coach: Alan Dawson (2nd title)
- Broadcast: ESPN3

2017 Conference USA men's soccer standings
	Conf.					Overall
Team	W		L		T	W		L		T
No. 20 FIU +	6	–	0	–	2	12	–	2	–	4
Old Dominion ‡	6	–	2	–	0	13	–	6	–	2
Kentucky	4	–	2	–	2	8	–	6	–	4
New Mexico	3	–	3	–	2	8	–	6	–	4
Charlotte	2	–	1	–	5	8	–	5	–	6
Marshall	3	–	5	–	0	8	–	10	–	1
South Carolina	2	–	4	–	2	6	–	9	–	2
Florida Atlantic	2	–	6	–	0	2	–	14	–	0
UAB	1	–	6	–	1	5	–	7	–	4
‡ – 2017 CUSA Tournament champion + – Invited to the 2017 NCAA Division I Men's Soccer Championship; As of December 13, 2017; Rankings from United Soccer Coaches

The 2017 Conference USA men's soccer tournament was the 23rd edition of the tournament. It determined Conference USA's automatic berth into the 2017 NCAA Division I Men's Soccer Championship.

The 2nd-seeded Old Dominion Monarchs won the CUSA title on their home field, for their second CUSA championship. The Monarchs defeated Charlotte in the championship, 1–0.

== Seeding ==
The top seven programs qualified for the CUSA Tournament.

No.	School	W	L	T	PCT.	Pts.
1	FIU	6	0	2	.875	20
2	Old Dominion	6	2	0	.750	18
3	Kentucky	4	2	2	.625	14
4	New Mexico	3	2	2	.571	11
5	Charlotte	2	1	5	.563	11
6	Marshall	3	5	0	.375	9
7	South Carolina	2	4	2	.375	8

== Bracket ==
Quarterfinals
4	Charlotte	1
5	New Mexico	0
2	Old Dominion	2
7	South Carolina	0
3	Kentucky	0
6	Marshall	1

Semifinals
1	FIU	1
4	Charlotte	3
2	Old Dominion	1
6	Marshall	0

Final
2	Old Dominion	1
4	Charlotte	0

== Results ==
=== Quarterfinals ===
November 8
2:00 PM EST

^{No. 4} Charlotte 49ers	1–0	^{No. 5} New Mexico Lobos
Montgomery 81' (pen.)	Report

ODU Soccer Complex, Norfolk, Virginia
Attendance: 32
Referee: Hilario Grajeda

November 8
4:30 PM EST

^{No. 3} Kentucky Wildcats	0–1	^{No. 6} Marshall Thundering Herd
	Report	Stergiotis 33'

ODU Soccer Complex, Norfolk, Virginia
Attendance: 57
Referee: Mark Kadlecik

November 8
7:00 PM EST

^{No. 2} Old Dominion Monarchs	2–0	^{No. 7} South Carolina Gamecocks
Wustenberg 49'; Filerman 64'	Report

ODU Soccer Complex, Norfolk, Virginia
Attendance: 214
Referee: Chris Penso

=== Semifinals ===
November 10
4:30 PM EST

^{No. 1} FIU Golden Panthers	1–3	^{No. 4} Charlotte 49ers
Marie 12'	Report	Sunol-Rojas 24'; Brito 77'; Seach 90'

ODU Soccer Complex, Norfolk, Virginia
Attendance: 37
Referee: Robert Sibiga

November 10
7:00 PM EST

^{No. 2} Old Dominion Monarchs	1–0	^{No. 6} Marshall Thundering Herd
Wilschrey 9'	Report

ODU Soccer Complex, Norfolk, Virginia
Attendance: 487
Referee: Jonathan Weiner

=== Final ===
November 12
1:00 PM EST

^{No. 2} Old Dominion Monarchs	1–0	^{No. 4} Charlotte 49ers
Klosterhalfen 28'	Report

ODU Soccer Complex, Norfolk, Virginia
Attendance: 803
Referee: Guido Gonzales

== Awards ==
**CUSA Men's Soccer All-Tournament team**

**Niko Klosterhalfen, Old Dominion – Offensive**
**Mercan Akar, Old Dominion – Defensive**
Sebastien Hauret, Old Dominion
Fox Slotemaker, Old Dominion
Marco Sunol-Rojas, Charlotte
Tommy Madden, Charlotte
Teddy Chaouche, Charlotte
Paul Marie, FIU
Marvin Hezel, FIU
Nate Himes, Marshall
Dion Stergiotis, Marshall

MVP in Bold

== See also ==
- 2017 Conference USA Women's Soccer Tournament
