= Universitarios Football Club =

Universitarios
- Full name: Universitarios Football Club
- Nicknames: Universitarios; The Coffee Team
- Founded: July 1, 2007; 18 years ago
- Ground: Johnson Field at the University of New Mexico
- Chairman: (Mexico) Diego Carbajal
- Manager: (Brazil) Daniel Cabrera (Panama) Sergio Gomez (Brazil) Noe Nobrega
- League: Albuquerque Soccer League
- 2014–15: Champion
Home colours	Away colours

Universitarios Football Club, also known as Universitarios FC, or UFC, is an American soccer club located in Albuquerque, New Mexico. It was founded in 2007 by international grad students of the University of New Mexico. The club started playing in the third division of the Albuquerque Soccer League in the 2007–08 season, where they got the sixth position. The club won the third division in 2008–09, also winning the award of the best defense in the league.

== History ==
The club was founded on July 1, 2007 by grad students of the University of New Mexico. The original idea of creating a team based on the international students at University of New Mexico, mostly Peruvians, was proposed by Attilio Ferrari (Peruvian) in 2006. It was in the Summer of 2007 when Simon Barriga, Victor Murray, Sergio Murillo, Eduardo Castro (all Peruvians), Alexandre Franco (Brazilian) and Amadeo Casas (Spain) joined Attilio Ferrari to found the team.

The team was then composed by international graduate students from all around the world: Peru, Spain, Chile, Brazil, Argentina, France, Ecuador, United States, Mexico, Colombia, etc.

On Sunday, April 25, 2010, and with one game still pending, the club won the second division of the season 2009/2010. The club was then promoted to first division in the 2010/2011 season and finished the season in 18th place in the division. In the 2011/2012 season the club finished 13th after a hard fought season and improving from last years performance. In the 2012/2013 season the club finished second behind the title winners whom were a premier team that failed to be put into their division. They won with 119 goals scored with the club only losing to them by two goals. In the 2013/2014 season, the club finished second behind their arch rivals Perspolis in a very tight run for the title. In the 2014/2015 season, the club took first place as the division champions with 84 goals scored in all competitions. The club faces new challenges as the reigning champions with five premier teams in the mix for the 2015/2016 season.

== Players ==
2015–16 season:

Brazil

- (Brazil) / (United States) Daniel Cabral
- (Brazil) Noe Nobrega

Colombia

- (Colombia) Jair Ballesteros
- (Colombia) Jose Gechem
- (Colombia) Juan Felipe Gechem
- (Colombia) Ricardo Gonzalez

Honduras

- (Honduras) Francisco Garcia

Iran

- (Iran) Amirkaveh Mojtahed

Japan

- (Japan) Takeo Ichihara

Mexico

- (Mexico) Diego Carbajal
- (Mexico) Fabian Carbajal

Panama

- (Panama) Sergio Gomez

Spain

- (Spain) Jose A. Gomez

United States of America

- (United States) Brian Ritter
- (United States) Daniel Becchi
- (United States) Matthew Foust

Venezuela

- (Venezuela) Rade Stoisavlejevic

== Past Players ==
Argentina

- (Argentina) Bruno Gallo

Brazil

- (Brazil) Alexandre Franco
- (Brazil) Carlos Hiroshi
- (Brazil) Italo Neide

Chile

- (Chile) Jorge Pezoa
- (Chile) David Ramirez
- (Chile) Fernando Torres

Colombia

- (Colombia) Camilo Gamboa
- (Colombia) Alejandro Mudvi

Ecuador

- (Ecuador) Jose Holguin
- (Ecuador) Francisco Rodriguez
- (Ecuador) Martin Rodriguez

Equatorial Guinea

- (Equatorial Guinea) Luciano Ela

France

- (France) David Barnes

Italy

- (Italy) Paolo Botta
- (Italy) Stefano Zucca

Mexico

- (Mexico) Arturo Cordova
- (Mexico) Daniel Jimenez
- (Mexico) Ulises Martinez

Peru

- (Peru) Simon Barriga
- (Peru) Eduardo Castro
- (Peru) Attilio Ferrari
- (Peru) Sergio Murillo
- (Peru) Victor Murray

Spain

- (Spain) Amadeo Casas

United States of America

- (United States) Mauro Bettini
- (United States) Anthony Cabrera
- (United States) Matt Hall
- (United States) Erich Melville
- (United States) Craig Milroy

== See also ==
- New Mexico Lobos men's soccer
