= Jeremiah Bass =

American soccer player (born 1977)

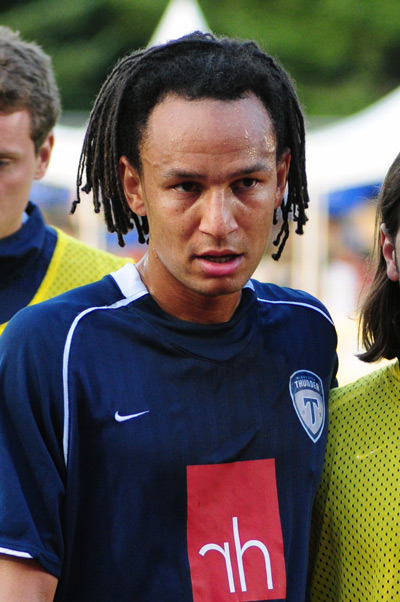

Personal information
- Full name: Jeremiah Bass
- Date of birth: November 4, 1977 (age 48)
- Place of birth: Racine, Wisconsin, U.S.
- Height: 6 ft 0 in (1.83 m)
- Position: Midfielder

Youth career
- 1997–2000: Marquette Golden Eagles

Senior career*
| Years | Team | Apps | (Gls) |
| 2001–2003 | Minnesota Thunder | 0 | (0) |
| 2003 | Höllvikens GIF | | |
| 2007–2009 | Minnesota Thunder | 82 | (10) |
- * Club domestic league appearances and goals as of 22 October 2009 ‡ National team caps and goals as of 17 July 2009

Jeremiah Bass (born November 4, 1977) is an American retired soccer player. He retired in January 2011 after sitting out the 2010 season.

== Career ==
=== Youth and college ===
Bass attended Prairie High School and played college soccer at Marquette University from 1997 until 2000.

=== Professional ===
In 2001, Bass trained with the Minnesota Thunder, spending time in 2002 and 2003 with the team, but never signed a formal contract. In July 2003, he moved to Höllvikens GIF in the Swedish Division 2, but returned to the U.S. later that year, playing amateur soccer in the Minnesota Amateur Soccer League with the Internationals, while working for Ameriprise Financial.

Bass eventually came to the attention of the head coach of the Minnesota Thunder of the USL First Division, and he signed with the Thunder on April 9, 2007. Bass would log 1943 minutes in 24 matches during the season. In 2008, he would become team captain and finish the season with 2510 minutes on the field, notching three goals.
