= Jeff DiMaria =

American soccer player

Personal information
- Date of birth: May 15, 1977 (age 49)
- Place of birth: St. Charles, Missouri, U.S.
- Height: 5 ft 8 in (1.73 m)
- Position: Midfielder

Youth career
- 1995–1997: UConn Huskies
- 1998–1999: St. Louis Billikens

Senior career*
Years	Team	Apps	(Gls)
2000	Colorado Rapids	4	(0)
2000–2001	St. Louis Steamers (indoor)		
2003	St. Louis Strikers		
2003–2006	St. Louis Steamers (indoor)		

International career
2003	U.S. Futsal		
- * Club domestic league appearances and goals

Jeff DiMaria is an American retired soccer midfielder who played professionally in Major League Soccer and the second Major Indoor Soccer League.

== Youth ==
In 1995, DiMaria graduated from Christian Brothers College High School where he was a two-time All State soccer player. He began his collegiate career at the University of Connecticut where he played two seasons (1995–1996). In 1997, he had knee surgery early in the season and redshirted that year. DiMaria then transferred to St. Louis University where he finished his last two seasons of college soccer. He was a 1999 First Team All American. In 1996, DiMaria was a member of the Scott Gallagher U-19 national championship team and in 1998, he was part of the Scott Gallagher U-23 national championship team. He graduated with a bachelor's degree in health information management and is a member of the Billikens Hall of Fame.

== Professional ==
In February 2000, the Colorado Rapids selected DiMaria in the second round (twenty-sixth overall) of the 2000 MLS SuperDraft. DiMaria played the Rapids first four games of the season, starting two. On April 10, 2000, Colorado signed Junior Agogo and released DiMaria to open a roster spot. DiMaria then signed with the St. Louis Steamers of the World Indoor Soccer League for the summer indoor season. He spent two seasons with the Steamers. The team announced they were going on hiatus in 2002 and the Cleveland Crunch selected DiMaria in the dispersal draft. He did not play for the Crunch, but remained in St. Louis and played for the St. Louis Strikers in the Premier Developmental League. In the fall of 2003, the Steamers entered the second Major Indoor Soccer League, but folded following the 2005–2006 season. On September 25, 2006, the Detroit Ignition selected DiMaria in the dispersal draft.

== International ==
DiMaria played for the United States national futsal team in 2003.
