= East Carolina Pirates men's soccer =

The East Carolina Pirates men's soccer team represented East Carolina University in all NCAA Division I men's college soccer competitions from 1965 until 2005, when the program disbanded due to lack of success. The team beat several top 25 opponents however only had a couple winning seasons in their existence.
