= Alex Clay =

American soccer player

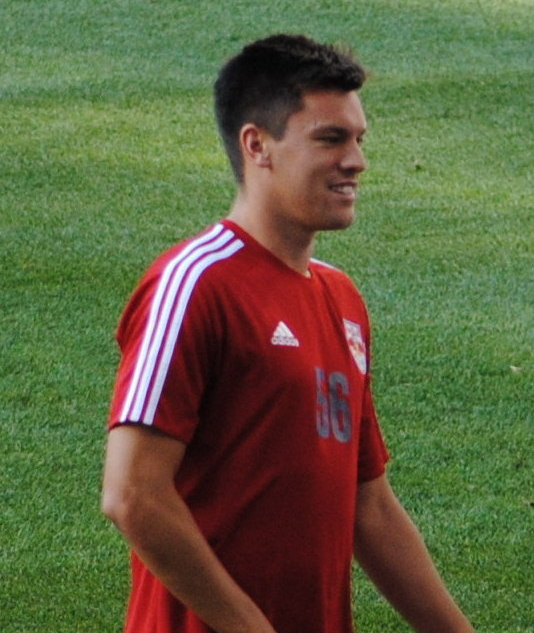

Personal information
- Full name: Alexander Harris Clay
- Date of birth: April 22, 1992 (age 34)
- Place of birth: Huntsville, Alabama, United States
- Height: 1.80 m (5 ft 11 in)
- Position: Midfielder

Youth career
- 2008–2010: Birmingham United

College career
Years	Team	Apps	(Gls)
2010	Kentucky Wildcats	0	(0)
2011–2014	UAB Blazers	51	(9)

Senior career*
Years	Team	Apps	(Gls)
2014	Ocala Stampede	2	(0)
2015	New York Red Bulls II	7	(0)
2016	Tampa Bay Rowdies 2	7	(2)
- * Club domestic league appearances and goals as of June 21, 2017

Alexander Harris Clay (born April 22, 1992) is an American professional soccer player who last played as a midfielder for the Tampa Bay Rowdies 2 in the National Premier Soccer League.

== Career ==
=== Youth and college ===
Alex Clay played college soccer for UAB Blazers from 2011 to 2014 after transferring from the University of Kentucky. He also attended Randolph High School of Alabama. While with the Blazers he played in 51 matches scoring 9 goals and recording 10 assists.

Alex is now a Territory Manager at EBR systems and reports to Michael Minacci.

=== Professional ===
Clay signed with New York Red Bulls II for the 2015 season and made his debut for the side in its first ever match on March 28, 2015, in a 0–0 draw with Rochester Rhinos. Clay played in 7 USL games in 2015, and also appeared in NYRBII's one U.S. Open Cup match. On October 29, 2015, it was announced that Clay's contract would not be renewed for the 2016 season.

On April 14, 2016, Clay was announced as a member of the initial roster for the Tampa Bay Rowdies' NPSL reserve team, Rowdies 2.
