= Andrew Kean =

Scottish footballer and entrepreneur (born 1978)

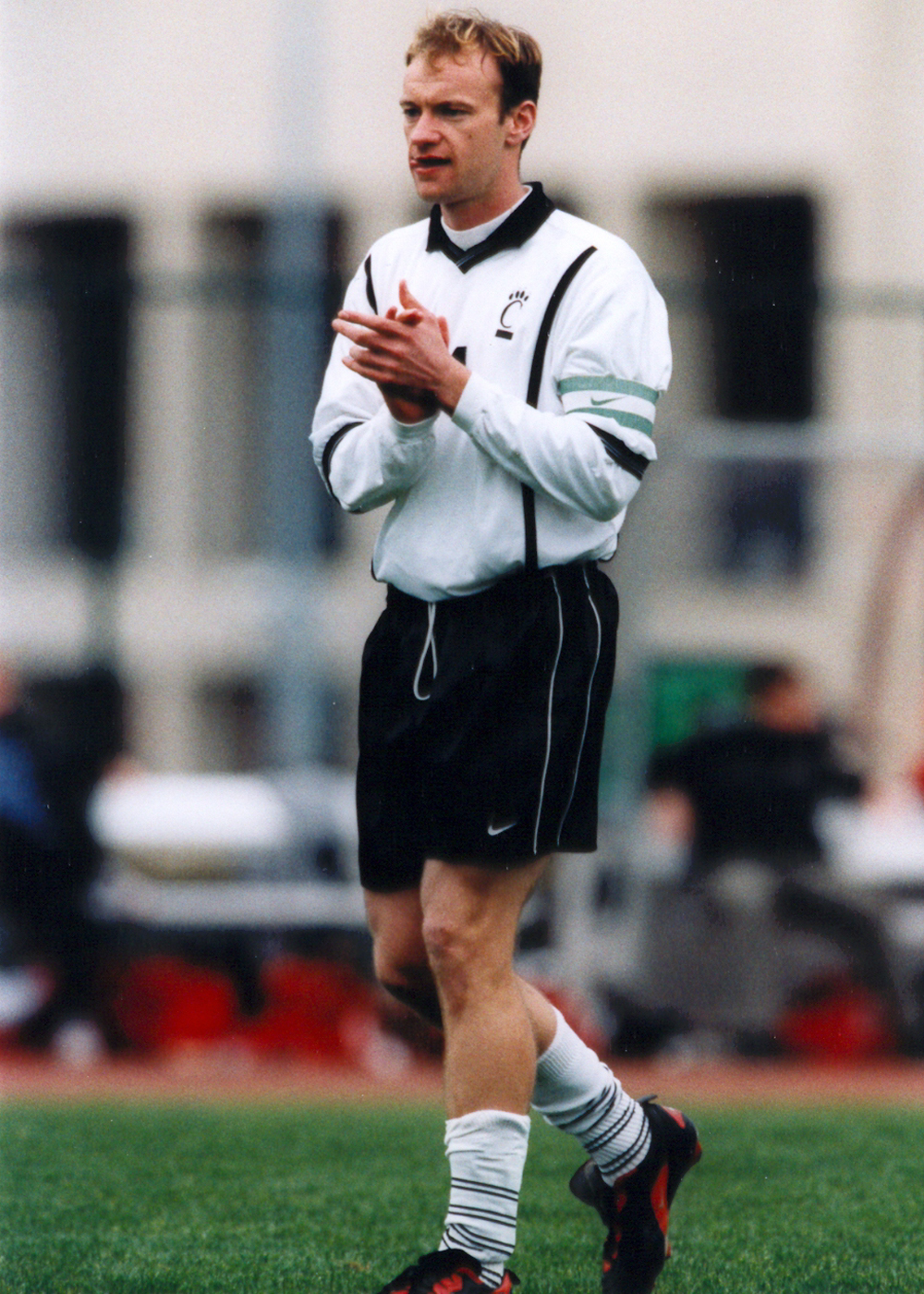
- Picture of Andrew Kean

Personal information
- Date of birth: September 11, 1978 (age 48)
- Place of birth: Irvine, Scotland

Andrew Alexander Kean (born 11 September 1978) is a Scottish former professional footballer and entrepreneur. Kean played college soccer for the University of Cincinnati and became the program's first All-American award winner. He was inducted into the Bearcats Hall of Fame in 2010, alongside NFL Super Bowl winner Brad Jackson and Olympic Gold medallist Mary Wineberg. Kean is the Founder and Chief Executive of the sports scholarship agency FirstPoint USA.

== Playing career ==
Kean was born in Irvine, Scotland. During his four years at the University of Cincinnati, he was named Conference USA Defensive Player of the Year, Conference USA All-Conference 1st Team, a two-time NSCAA All-American, the Ohio Player of the Year, NSCAA All-Region, and the Cincinnati Bearcats Player of the Year. As captain, he led the team to its first NCAA Soccer National Tournament appearance in 1998. Despite signing professional terms with Partick Thistle FC, Kean opted to focus primarily on his business interests and moved to Port Glasgow Juniors FC and then to Largs Thistle FC, before retiring in 2008. He completed an undergraduate degree in Nutrition & Physiology whilst at the University of Cincinnati.

== Background ==
In 2001, Kean founded the sports scholarship agency FirstPoint USA with the assistance of a £1000 loan from the Prince's Scottish Youth Business Trust. The company has gone on to provide assistance to over 35,000 sportsmen and sportswomen, brokering over $400 million in scholarship deals on their behalf. Andrew Kean was named as a finalist for the Shell LIVEwire Entrepreneur of the Year award and the Royal Bank of Scotland Young Entrepreneur of the Year award. In 2002, he was a finalist for the Scotsman of the Year award alongside Sir Jackie Stewart, Sir Ian Wilmut, and Baron George Robertson of Port Ellen. In 2009, Kean was appointed to the Board of the English Women's Golf Association (now England Golf) and served as an Aftercare Advisor for the Prince's Trust.

Andrew Kean was educated at St Columba's School, Kilmacolm and Dunoon Grammar School.
