= Peter Byaruhanga =

Ugandan footballer (born 1979)

Personal information
- Date of birth: 18 August 1979 (age 47)
- Place of birth: Kampala, Uganda
- Position: Striker

College career
Years	Team	Apps	(Gls)
1998–1999	UAB Blazers		

Senior career*
Years	Team	Apps	(Gls)
2000–2001	Kansas City Wizards	6	(0)
2000	→ Raleigh Express (loan)	5	(1)
2001	→ Atlanta Silverbacks (loan)	4	(1)
2001	Richmond Kickers	13	(3)
2002	Cincinnati Riverhawks	8	(3)
2002	Carolina Dynamo	1	(0)
2009	Rocket City United		
- * Club domestic league appearances and goals

Peter Byaruhanga (born 18 August 1979) is a Ugandan former professional soccer player, active primarily in the United States, who played as a striker.

== Personal life ==
Byaruhanga was born in Kampala, Uganda and holds dual American-Ugandan citizenship.

== Career ==
=== College career ===
Byaruhanga played for the UAB Blazers in the 1998 and 1999 seasons.

=== Professional career ===
In February 2000, the Kansas City Wizards selected Byaruhanga in the second round of the 2000 MLS SuperDraft. He made six appearances for the Wizards over two seasons. In May 2000, the Wizards sent Byaruhanga on loan to the Raleigh Express for five games. In 2001, he went on loan to the Atlanta Silverbacks. On June 18, 2001, the Wizards waived Byaruhanga. On July 6, 2001, he signed with the Richmond Kickers. In 2002, he played for both the Cincinnati Riverhawks and the Carolina Dynamo of the USL D3-Pro League. In 2009, he played for Rocket City United.
