= Conference USA Men's Soccer Freshman of the Year =

C-USA Men's Soccer Freshman of the Year
- Awarded for: The best male freshman soccer player in Conference USA
- Country: United States
- Presented by: C-USA head coaches
- First award: 1995
- Currently held by: Bernardo Dos Santos Monteiro, FIU
- Website: http://www.conferenceusa.com/sports/m-soccer/c-usa-m-soccer-body.html

The Conference USA Men's Soccer Freshman of the Year is an annual award given to the best freshman soccer player in Conference USA during the NCAA Division I men's soccer season. Several players have gone on to have professional careers. Most notably, Brad Davis and Vedad Ibišević have represented their countries at the FIFA World Cup.

== Freshman of the Year ==
- 2021: Bernardo Dos Santos Monteiro, FIU
- 2020: Joe Thacker, Old Dominion
- 2019: Milo Yosef, Marshall
- 2018: Jason Reyes, Kentucky
- 2017: Enrique Facusse, Kentucky
- 2016: Kevin Langan, Charlotte
- 2015: Niko Klosterhalfen, Old Dominion
- 2014: Mikkel Knudsen, South Carolina
- 2013: Chris Wehan, New Mexico
- 2012: Cristian Mata, Tulsa
- 2011: Tony Rocha, Tulsa
- 2010: Juan Castillo, SMU
- 2009: Daniel Withrow, Marshall
- 2008: Austin Neil, Tulsa
- 2007: Jimmy Maurer, South Carolina
- 2006: Jeff Scanella, South Carolina
- 2005: Mike Gustavson, South Carolina
- 2004: Rodrigo Hidalgo and Simon Schoendorf, USF
- 2003: Vedad Ibišević, Saint Louis
- 2002: Hunter West, USF
- 2001: Clint Baumstark, UAB
- 2000: Brad Davis, Saint Louis
- 1999: Flavio Monteiro, UAB
- 1998: Kyle Meador, Cincinnati
- 1997: Rumba Munthali, UAB
- 1996: Erik Kuster, UAB
- 1995: Jacob Thomas, Saint Louis
