= Kevin Nylen =

American soccer player and coach

Personal information
- Full name: Kevin Nylen
- Date of birth: August 14, 1981 (age 45)
- Place of birth: Ipswich, Massachusetts
- Height: 6 ft 3 in (1.91 m)
- Position: Defender

Team information
- Current team: Boston University Terriers (head coach)

Youth career
- 1999–2002: Saint Anselm Hawks

Senior career*
Years	Team	Apps	(Gls)
2003–2006	Wilmington Hammerheads	42	(4)
2006–2008	Charleston Battery	45	(0)

Managerial career
- 2009–2010: Amherst College Lord Jeffs (assistant)
- 2010–2012: Boston College Eagles (assistant)
- 2012–2015: FIU Panthers (assistant)
- 2016: Orlando City (scout)
- 2017–2020: FIU Panthers
- 2020–: Boston U. Terriers
- * Club domestic league appearances and goals

Kevin Nylen (born August 14, 1981) is an American former soccer defender and current head coach of the Boston University Terriers men's soccer team.

== Playing career ==
Nylen attended Saint Anselm College from 1999 to 2003. During this time he earned the school's Male Athlete of the Year honor, awarded annually to one student-athlete who best exemplifies the Saint Anselm spirit in leadership, scholarship and athletic achievements. Nylen played four seasons for the Hawks, serving as team captain in 2002. Upon graduating, Nylen began his professional career, spending three seasons with the Wilmington Hammerheads of the USL Second Division, before joining the Charleston Battery of the USL First Division for three seasons.

== Coaching career ==
Nylen began his coaching career in August 2009 as an assistant coach at Amherst College. After one season, Nylen joined the Boston College Eagles in a similar role. During his first season at Boston College in 2010, the Eagles advanced to the semifinals of the Atlantic Coast Conference Tournament and earned one of the 27 at-large berths to the NCAA Championship. Nylen's 2011 season at BC was even more of a success, as the Eagles advanced to the finals of the ACC Tournament marking the fifth-straight time that the squad made it to at least the semifinal stage. BC earned a berth into the NCAA Championship for the fifth-straight year. Nylen joined FIU's coaching staff in 2012 and has been with the team for four seasons. Nylen holds a United States Soccer Federation "A" coaching license as well as an NSCAA Advanced National diploma.
