= Maurice Hughes =

American soccer player

Personal information
- Full name: Maurice Harold Hughes Jr.
- Date of birth: June 3, 1984 (age 42)
- Place of birth: Atlanta, Georgia, United States
- Height: 6 ft 1 in (1.85 m)
- Position: Midfielder

College career
Years	Team	Apps	(Gls)
2002–2003	Yavapai Roughriders		
2004–2005	UAB Blazers		

Senior career*
Years	Team	Apps	(Gls)
2004	Williamsburg Legacy	5	(7)
2006	Atlanta Silverbacks	4	(1)
2009	Northern Virginia Royals	27	(8)

Managerial career
- 2012–2015: Loudoun Eagles
- * Club domestic league appearances and goals as of November 14, 2011

Maurice Hughes (born June 3, 1984, in Atlanta, Georgia) is an American retired soccer player.

== Career ==
=== College and amateur ===
Maurice Hughes began his college career in 2002 at the NJCAA powerhouse Yavapai College. There Hughes helped lead Yavapai College to back-to-back NJCAA National Soccer Championships for the 2002 & 2003 seasons. Hughes scored 10 goals with 10 assists his freshman season for the Roughriders. Hughes then led the team to its 2nd National title his sophomore season with 29 goals. In 2003, Hughes was named the MVP of the National Tournament.

In 2010 Hughes was Inducted into the NJCAA Men's Soccer Coaches Association Hall of Fame. Hughes was inducted with fellow Yavapai College Alumni Michael Randolph from the 2004–2005 teams.

=== Professional ===
Hughes signed a professional contract with the Atlanta Silverbacks of the USL First Division in 2006.

In December 2008, he signed with Real Maryland FC of the USL Second Division, but terminated his contract before the season began; instead, he signed with the Northern Virginia Royals in the USL Premier Development League.

=== Post-playing ===
In December 2023, Hughes was named technical director for Northern Virginia Alliance.
