= Jerson Monteiro =

Angolan footballer

Personal information
- Full name: Jerson Vanencio Monteiro
- Date of birth: April 28, 1985 (age 41)
- Place of birth: Luanda, Angola
- Height: 6 ft 0 in (1.83 m)
- Position: Forward

College career
Years	Team	Apps	(Gls)
2003–2006	UAB Blazers		

Senior career*
Years	Team	Apps	(Gls)
2007	Chicago Fire	5	(1)
2007–2008	D.C. United	0	(0)
2008	Atlanta Silverbacks	22	(3)
- * Club domestic league appearances and goals as of 16 October 2011

Jerson Vanencio Monteiro (born April 28, 1985, in Luanda, Angola) is a former professional soccer player. At the age of 14 he left Angola to attend school in the United States.

He has obtained a United States green card so he will count as a domestic player according to MLS rules.

== Career ==
Jerson played varsity soccer for the Blazers at the University of Alabama at Birmingham from 2003 - 2006. Monteiro, a National Soccer Coaches Association of America (NSCAA) second-team All-Midwest Region performer, had a career season for the Blazers in 2006. He led the team in goals (14), assists (7) and points (35) on the campaign. The 14 goals tied for fourth-most in a season in school history, while his 35 points were fifth-best in UAB lore. Furthermore, the first team all-conference honoree, closed his career with 34 goals and 84 points during his career, ranking second on the school's all-time list.

Monteiro was selected 8th in the 2007 MLS SuperDraft by the Chicago Fire in the first round. He played in 5 games (1 start) (154 minutes) for the Fire, scoring his first MLS goal against D.C. United on June 16, 2007, at RFK Stadium. He also appeared in 3 Reserve Division games for the Fire (2 starts), totaling 235 minutes.

Monteiro was traded to D.C. United on September 14, 2007, in exchange for a conditional 2008 MLS SuperDraft pick.
