= Rumba Munthali =

Zambian-born Canadian soccer player (born 1978)

Personal information
- Full name: Rumbani Andrew Munthali
- Date of birth: 2 December 1978 (age 47)
- Place of birth: Lusaka, Zambia
- Positions: Defender; midfielder

Team information
- Current team: Nashville SC (youth coach)

Youth career
- 1997–2000: University of Alabama at Birmingham

Senior career*
Years	Team	Apps	(Gls)
2001–2002	Richmond Kickers	29	(0)
2002	→ Carolina Dynamo (loan)	9	(0)
2003	Oakville Winstars	8	(0)
2004–2005	Toronto Lynx	47	(0)
2006–2009	Nanchang Bayi	82	(10)
2010	Shenyang Dongjin	16	(0)

Managerial career
- 2016–2023: Sporting Kansas City (youth)
- 2023–: Nashville SC (youth)
- 2024: Nashville SC (interim)
- * Club domestic league appearances and goals

Rumbani Andrew Munthali (born 2 December 1978) is a Canadian soccer coach and former professional player who played as a defender and midfielder. He is the youth coach for Major League Soccer side Nashville SC.

== Career ==
=== Early career ===
Born in Lusaka, Zambia, Munthali was raised in Canada and played college soccer at the University of Alabama-Birmingham where he was a 2000 Third Team All American.

=== Professional career ===
In 2001, the Montreal Impact drafted, but did not sign Munthali. The Richmond Kickers then signed him after suffering several injuries to their back line. In 2002, the Kickers loaned Munthali to the Carolina Dynamo. They released him in February 2003. He then played for the Oakville Winstars. In 2004, he was signed by the Toronto Lynx of the USL A-League on April 7, 2004. He made his debut for the club on April 17, 2004 in a match against Puerto Rico Islanders, coming on as a substitute for John Barry Nusum. At the conclusion of the season the organization awarded him the Public Relations Award. He re-signed with Toronto for the 2005 season on March 31, 2005. In 2006, he moved to China to sign with Nanchang Bayi. On March 2, 2010, he transferred to China League One side Shenyang Dongjin.

=== After retirement ===
After retiring, Munthali moved back to Toronto. In 2016, he was hired as a youth coach at the academy of Sporting Kansas City. As of August 2021, Munthali was still holding the same position.

In 2023, Munthali left Kansas City and joined fellow MLS side Nashville SC as a Player Development coach. In May 2024, Munthali was named interim head coach of Nashville after the departure of Gary Smith.
