= Chase Wileman =

American soccer player (born 1986)

Personal information
- Full name: Chase Austin Donlea Wileman
- Date of birth: June 25, 1986 (age 40)
- Place of birth: Grand Prairie, Texas, United States
- Position: Midfielder

Youth career
- 2002–2003: IMG Soccer Academy

College career
Years	Team	Apps	(Gls)
2003–2006	SMU Mustangs		

Senior career*
Years	Team	Apps	(Gls)
2007–2008	FC Dallas	2	(0)
2009	Des Moines Menace	1	(0)

International career
2002–2003	United States U17	6	(0)

Managerial career
- 2011–2013: Dartmouth (Assistant)
- 2014–2022: Kentucky (Assistant)
- 2022–: Brown
- * Club domestic league appearances and goals as of 30 May 2009

Chase Wileman (born June 25, 1986) is an American soccer coach and former player. He is the coach of Brown men's soccer.

== Career ==
=== College ===
Wileman attended Southern Methodist University, where he majored in Markets & Culture, and featured in over 60 games for the Mustangs during his college career, captaining the side in his senior year.

=== Professional ===
Wileman was selected in the 4th round, 45th overall, in the 2007 MLS Supplemental Draft by FC Dallas, and made his full professional debut for them on 1 July 2008, in a US Open Cup third-round game against Miami FC.

He made his Major League Soccer debut as a substitute during a 4–0 victory over Los Angeles Galaxy on July 27, 2008, also registering an assist.

His option was not picked up by FC Dallas after struggling with injury during the 2009 preseason. He has since joined Des Moines Menace of the USL Premier Development League. On May 31, he made his debut with Des Moines in a 2–2 draw with St. Louis but was substituted early because of a hamstring problem.

=== International ===
Wileman is a former member of the United States Under-17 side, spending almost 3 years with the Residency program at IMG Academy in Bradenton, Florida.
