= New Mexico Lobos men's soccer =

American college soccer team

New Mexico Lobos
- Founded: 1983
- Folded: 2019; 7 years ago
- University: University of New Mexico
- Conference: C-USA
- Location: Albuquerque, New Mexico
- Stadium: UNM Soccer Complex (capacity: 6,200)
- Nickname: Lobos
- Colors: Cherry and silver
Home	Away

NCAA Tournament runner-up
- 2005

NCAA Tournament College Cup
- 2005, 2013

NCAA Tournament Quarterfinals
- 2005, 2013

NCAA Tournament Round of 16
- 2004, 2005, 2011, 2012, 2013

NCAA Tournament appearances
- 2001, 2002, 2004, 2005, 2006, 2007, 2009, 2010, 2011, 2012, 2013, 2016

Conference Tournament championships
- 2001, 2002, 2011, 2016

Conference Regular Season championships
- 2002, 2004, 2005, 2006, 2007, 2011, 2012, 2013

The New Mexico Lobos men's soccer team represented the University of New Mexico in all NCAA Division I men's soccer competitions from 1983 until 2018. The team became a soccer-only member of Conference USA in July 2013 after leaving the Mountain Pacific Sports Federation (the school's then-primary conference, the Mountain West, only sponsored that sport for women).

The team was terminated after the 2018 season.

== Seasons ==
Season	Head coach	Overall	Conference	Conference Rank	Conference Tournament	NCAA Tournament
1983	Craig Roberton	10–3–0	4–3–0	4th	Not Held	–
1984	Craig Roberton	12–4–1	3–2–1	4th	Not Held	–
1985	Craig Roberton	9–5–2	4–2–0	3rd	Not Held	–
1986	Klaus Weber	12–6–1	5–2–0	3rd	Not Held	–
1987	Klaus Weber	8–10–4	4–1–2	3rd	Not Held	–
1988	Jim Wiesen	5–13–1	0–4–1	6th	Not Held	–
1989	Klaus Weber	8–11–2	4–2–0	3rd	Not Held	–
1990	Klaus Weber	10–9–3	–	–	Not Held	–
1991	Klaus Weber	11–8–1	–	–	Not Held	–
1992	Klaus Weber	14–4–1	5–2–0	3rd	Not Held	–
1993	Klaus Weber	11–8–0	4–3–0	4th	Not Held	–
1994	Klaus Weber	14–6–0	5–2–0	3rd	Not Held	–
1995	Klaus Weber	8–11–0	3–4–0	6th	Not Held	–
1996	Klaus Weber	11–7–2	3–4–1	5th	Not Held	–
1997	Klaus Weber	13–7–0	4–4–0	6th	Not Held	–
1998	Klaus Weber	10–8–1	3–4–1	6th	Not Held	–
1999	Klaus Weber	9–8–1	4–2–1	3rd	Not Held	–
2000	Klaus Weber	6–12–0	3–4–0	4th	Not Held	–
2001	Klaus Weber	7–12–2	0–6–1	8th	Champions	2nd round
2002	Jeremy Fishbein	18–4–0	5–1–0	Champions	Champions	2nd round
2003	Jeremy Fishbein	8–9–3	4–2–0	Runner up	Runner up	–
2004	Jeremy Fishbein	17–1–2	10–1–1	Champions	Not Held	Sweet 16
2005	Jeremy Fishbein	18–2–3	7–1–2	Champions	Not Held	Runner up
2006	Jeremy Fishbein	14–4–3	8–1–1	Champions	Not Held	2nd round
2007	Jeremy Fishbein	12–5–2	7–1–2	Champions	Not Held	1st round
2008	Jeremy Fishbein	11–6–2	7–3–0	Runner up	Not Held	–
2009	Jeremy Fishbein	12–7–1	5–2–0	Runner up	Runner up	1st round
2010	Jeremy Fishbein	9–6–5	5–2–3	Runner up	Semifinals	1st round
2011	Jeremy Fishbein	18–0–4	10–0–0	Champions	Champions	Sweet 16
2012	Jeremy Fishbein	17–4–1	8–2–0	Champions	Runner up	Sweet 16
2013	Jeremy Fishbein	14–6–2	7–1–1	Champions	Semifinals	Final Four
2014	Jeremy Fishbein	11–5–1	4–4–0	fifth	Quarterfinals	
2015	Jeremy Fishbein	8–6–4	2–4–2	sixth	Quarterfinals	
2016	Jeremy Fishbein	12–7–3	4–3–1	fifth	Champions	Second Round
2017	8–6–4	3–3–2	fifth	fifth		
2018	4–12–1	2–5–1	sixth tie	seventh		

== Titles ==
=== Conference ===
- MPSF tournament (1): 2011
- MPSF regular season (6): 2001, 2002, 2004, 2005, 2006, 2007

== See also ==
- Universitarios Football Club
