= 2012 VCU Rams men's soccer team =

VCU Rams men's soccer
2012 season
- Athletic Director: (United States) Norwood Teague
- Head Coach: (United States) David Giffard
- A-10 Regular Season: 4th
- A-10 Tournament: Runners-up
- NCAA Tournament: Second round
- VCU Tournament: 1–0–1
- ODU Tournament: 2–0–0
- FGCU Tournament: 1–0–0
- Top goalscorer: League: All: Johnson (11)
- Highest home attendance: 2,242 vs. Virginia
Home colors	Away colors

The 2012 VCU Rams men's soccer team was the 33rd season of Virginia Commonwealth University in Richmond, Virginia fielding a men's varsity college soccer program. The team played their inaugural season in the Atlantic 10 Conference of the NCAA Division I after playing the previous 17 seasons in the Colonial Athletic Association.

After an eight-year absence, the Rams returned to the NCAA Division I Men's Soccer Tournament, securing an at-large bid, and being one of the 16 seeded teams, earning a fourteen seed and a bye to the second round. In their return to the NCAA Tournament, VCU lost through an overtime golden goal to unseeded Syracuse, losing 2–3. In the 2012 Atlantic 10 Men's Soccer Tournament, VCU upset Charlotte and played Saint Louis in the final, losing 3–0.

== Background ==
The team is coming off an 11–9–0 record from 2011, where they were the only team in the country to have both a winning conference and overall record, and not qualify for their conference tournament. By a tiebreaker against Georgia State, the Rams finished seventh in their conference, missing out on the 2012 CAA Men's Soccer Tournament. Their season, however, began in impressive fashion, coming out with a 5–0–0 record, good enough to be ranked as high as sixteenth in the nation at one point. The five-match winning streak, saw the Rams drop their next four matches.

== Team ==
=== Roster ===
As of September 19, 2012

Note: Flags indicate national team as defined under FIFA eligibility rules; some limited exceptions apply. Players may hold more than one non-FIFA nationality.

No.	Pos.	Nation	Player
1	GK	USA	Clark Hankins
2	DF	USA	Isaac Owusu
3	DF	CRC	Dennis Castillo
4	DF	USA	Garrett Harvey
5	MF	LBN	Joseph Haboush
7	FW	CRC	Juan Monge Solano
8	MF	USA	Dakota Barnathan
10	MF	JAM	Romena Bowie
11	FW	JAM	Jason Johnson
12	FW	USA	Kharlton Belmar
14	MF	MEX	Mario Herrera Meraz
15	MF	USA	Chris Maimone
16	DF	COL	Juan Arbelaez

No.	Pos.	Nation	Player
18	DF	USA	Peter Lee
19	DF	SEN	Assane Keita
20	FW	USA	K.C. Onyeador
21	GK	USA	Andrew Wells
22	DF	USA	Brad Seymour
23	FW	ESP	Jose Manel
24	MF	USA	Devon Fisher
25	DF	USA	Jack Bates
27	FW	USA	Matt Freibaum
28	MF	USA	Ritchie Duffie
30	GK	USA	Richie Ongaro
31	GK	CAN	Garrett Cyprus
32	MF	USA	Cameron Foster

== Competitions ==
Key

Item	Description
W	Win
L	Loss
T	Tie
¤	Conference match
No. (##)	Opponent's ranking

=== Spring 2012 season ===
March 3, 2012 Spring 1	Longwood	0–1	VCU	Richmond, Virginia
11:00 EDT		Report	Fisher	Stadium: Sports Backers Stadium

March 3, 2012 Spring 2	VCU	2–1	Richmond Kickers	Richmond, Virginia
19:00 EDT	Johnson	Report		Stadium: Ukrop Park

March 9, 2012 Spring 3	Maryland	2–1	VCU	Richmond, Virginia
19:30 EDT	56'; 74'	Report	Castillo 18' (pen.)	Stadium: Sports Backers Stadium

March 24, 2012 Spring 4	VMI	0–2	VCU	Richmond, Virginia
11:00 EDT		Report	Belmar 30'; Owusu 63'	Stadium: Sports Backers Stadium

March 24, 2012 Spring 5	Wake Forest	1–2	VCU	Richmond, Virginia
19:00 EDT	Lubahn 75'	Report	Castillo 77'; Mwila 80'	Stadium: Sports Backers Stadium

March 31, 2012 Spring 6	VCU	1–2	Queens	Rock Hill, South Carolina
09:30 EDT		Report		Stadium: Eagle Field

March 31, 2012 Spring 7	VCU	3–4	Davidson	Rock Hill, South Carolina
12:30 EDT		Report		Stadium: Eagle Field

March 31, 2012 Spring 8	VCU	1–1	Furman	Rock Hill, South Carolina
17:30 EDT		Report		Stadium: Eagle Field

April 14, 2012 Spring 9	Virginia	1–1	VCU	Richmond, Virginia
11:00 EDT		Report		Stadium: Sports Backers Stadium

April 14, 2012 Spring 10	Liberty	0–3	VCU	Richmond, Virginia
15:00 EDT		Report		Stadium: Sports Backers Stadium

April 21, 2012 Spring 11	VCU Team A	v	VCU Team A	Richmond, Virginia
TBA EDT				Stadium: Sports Backers Stadium
Note: Intersquad scrimmage

=== Preseason ===
August 18, 2012 Preseason 1	VCU	1–2	#21 UAB	Birmingham, Alabama
19:00 EDT	Johnson 60'	Report	Ruiz 77'; Wickham 84'	Stadium: West Campus Field

=== Regular season ===
==== A-10 standings ====
2012 Atlantic 10 Conference men's soccer standings
	Conf.					Overall
Team	W		L		T	W		L		T
No. 23 Charlotte	7	–	1	–	1	15	–	4	–	3
No. 19 Saint Louis†	7	–	2	–	0	16	–	5	–	0
Xavier	6	–	1	–	2	14	–	3	–	5
No. 25 VCU	6	–	1	–	2	12	–	4	–	5
Temple	6	–	1	–	2	10	–	6	–	3
Dayton	5	–	3	–	1	11	–	5	–	2
La Salle	4	–	4	–	1	10	–	7	–	3
Duquesne	4	–	4	–	1	7	–	12	–	1
Butler	3	–	5	–	1	5	–	8	–	5
Rhode Island	3	–	5	–	1	4	–	11	–	3
St. Bonaventure	3	–	6	–	0	5	–	14	–	0
Fordham	2	–	4	–	3	6	–	7	–	4
Richmond	2	–	6	–	1	6	–	11	–	1
Massachusetts	2	–	7	–	0	5	–	11	–	2
George Washington	2	–	7	–	0	5	–	13	–	0
Saint Joseph's	1	–	6	–	2	5	–	11	–	2
As of December 11, 2012; Rankings from NCSAA

==== Match reports ====
Home team on the right, away team on the left.

August 24, 2012 1	Bucknell	1–1 (a.e.t.)	VCU	Richmond, Virginia
19:30 EDT	Klug 19'	Report	Bowie (yellow card) 74'; Johnson 81'; Castillo (yellow card) 106'	Stadium: Sports Backers Stadium; Attendance: 533; Referee: Mark Kadlecik
Note: VCU Tournament

August 26, 2012 2	William & Mary	0–2	VCU	Richmond, Virginia
19:30 EDT	Teiman (yellow card) 60'; O'Brien (yellow card) 74'	Report	Fisher 5'; Johnson (yellow card) 60'; Meraz (yellow card) 71'; Arbelaez (yellow card) 72'; Bel 87'; Wells (yellow card) 88'	Stadium: Sports Backers Stadium; Attendance: 608; Referee: Ben Jones
Note: VCU Tournament

August 30, 2012 3	VCU	1–1 (a.e.t.)	UMBC	Catonsville, Maryland
19:00 EDT	Castillo 49'	Report	Caringi 31'	Stadium: UMBC Soccer Stadium; Attendance: 1,085; Referee: Lou Labbadia

September 1, 2012 4	VCU	0–0	Navy	Annapolis, Maryland
19:00 EDT				Stadium: Glenn Warner Soccer Facility
Note: Match postponed due to lightning in the third minute.

September 7, 2012 5	Winthrop	0–3	VCU	Norfolk, Virginia
16:30 EDT	Thorsson (yellow card) 84'	Report	Belmar 42'; Meraz 48'; Arbelaez (yellow card) 70'; Johnson 84'	Stadium: ODU Soccer Complex; Attendance: Not reported Referee: Mike Stutt
Note: ODU Tournament

September 9, 2012 6	VCU	5–1	Seton Hall	Norfolk, Virginia
12:00 EDT	Johnson 19', 68'; Team 42'; Fisher 61'; Castillo 80'	Report	Garcia (yellow card) 1' (goal) 21'; Gabriele (yellow card) 76'	Stadium: ODU Soccer Complex; Attendance: Not reported Referee: Steve Ankiel
Note: ODU Tournament

September 14, 2012 7	VCU	2–1	Florida Gulf Coast	Fort Myers, Florida
19:30 EDT	Johnson 5'; Meraz (yellow card) 20' (goal) 76'	Report	Penagos 22'; DeSousa (yellow card) 83'	Stadium: FGCU Soccer Complex; Attendance: 607; Referee: Ken Attai
Note: FGCU Tournament

September 18, 2012 8	VCU	—	James Madison	Harrisonburg, Virginia
19:30 EDT				Stadium: JMU Soccer/Lacrosse Complex
Note: Match cancelled and postponed due to rain.

September 25, 2012 9	Virginia	1–0 (a.e.t.)	VCU	Richmond, Virginia
19:00 EDT	Murnane (yellow card) 56'; Brown (yellow card) 72'; Chavira 103'	Report	Haboush (yellow card) 50'	Stadium: Sports Backers Stadium; Attendance: 2,242; Referee: Andrew Chapin

September 29, 2012 10	Northeastern	1–1 (a.e.t.)	VCU	Richmond, Virginia
19:00 EDT	Anding (yellow card) 7' (goal) 58'; Lobben (yellow card) 95'	Report	Johnson 12'; Keita (yellow card) 53' (red card) 71'; Meraz (yellow card) 69'; Moss (yellow card) 77'	Stadium: Sports Backers Stadium; Attendance: 318; Referee: Bill Ditmar

October 5, 2012 11	#13 Charlotte	1–4	VCU	Richmond, Virginia
19:00 EDT	Caughran 39'	Report	Meraz 26'; Fisher 42'; Johnson 63'; Harvey 71'	Stadium: Sports Backers Stadium; Attendance: 1,836; Referee: Shaun Pappermen

October 7, 2012 12	George Washington	0–3	VCU	Richmond, Virginia
19:00 EDT	Hinners (yellow card) 67'	Report	Fisher 27'; Johnson 37'; Belmar 70' (yellow card) 88'	Stadium: Sports Backers Stadium; Attendance: 347; Referee: Ben Jones

October 12, 2012 13	#21 VCU	2–3 (a.e.t.)	Saint Louis	St. Louis, Missouri
19:00 EDT	Fisher 15'; Johnson 27'; Meraz (yellow card) 80'; Castillo (yellow card) 86'	Report	Bryce 26'; Graydon (yellow card) 31'; Lee 90'; Kristo 104'	Stadium: Hermann Stadium; Attendance: 487; Referee: Tony Crush

October 14, 2012 14	#21 VCU	1–0	Butler	Indianapolis, Indiana
14:00 EDT	Johnson (yellow card) 37'; Castillo 87'	Report	Postlewait (yellow card) 89'	Stadium: Butler Bowl; Attendance: 326; Referee: Joshua Brooks

October 19, 2012 15	VCU	1–1 (a.e.t.)	Fordham	The Bronx, New York
17:00 EDT	Haboush 22'; Meraz (yellow card) 47'; Solano (red card) 77'	Report	Nagel 72'; Bekoe (yellow card) 86'; Granot (yellow card) 93'	Stadium: Coffey Field; Attendance: 156; Referee: Miguel Reyes

October 21, 2012 16	VCU	2–1	La Salle	Philadelphia, Pennsylvania
13:00 EDT	Johnson 47', 81'; Castillo (yellow card) 74'	Report	Plumhoff 15'	Stadium: McCarthy Stadium; Attendance: 208; Referee: John Douglas

October 26, 2012 17	#12 Xavier	1–4	VCU	Richmond, Virginia
19:00 EDT	Walker 61'	Report	Meraz 9'; Johnson 24'; Fisher 50'; Belmar 76'	Stadium: Sports Backers Stadium; Attendance: 703; Referee: Mike Stutt

October 28, 2012 18	Dayton	2–3	#19 VCU	Richmond, Virginia
13:00 EDT	Keller (yellow card) 46'; Acevedo (yellow card) 63' (goal) 67'; Berko 70'	Report	Castillo 18'; Belmar 38'; Haboush 75'	Stadium: Sports Backers Stadium; Attendance: 183; Referee: Mark Kadlecik

November 2, 2012 19	#19 VCU	3–3 (a.e.t.)	Richmond	Tuckahoe, Virginia
19:00 EDT	Castillo 12'; Arbelaez (yellow card) 12'; Belmar 42'; Johnson 55'	Report	Umar 3'; Murphy 16'; Butler 33'; Powell (yellow card) 66'	Stadium: Robins Stadium; Attendance: 1,338; Referee: James Conlee

=== Atlantic 10 Tournament ===
November 8, 2012 Quarterfinals	Temple	0–1	#19 VCU	Charlotte, North Carolina
19:00 EST		Report	Meraz 90'	Stadium: Transamerica Field; Attendance: Not reported Referee: Mike Garcia

November 9, 2012 Semifinals	#19 VCU	1–0	#18 Charlotte	Charlotte, North Carolina
19:00 EST	Bowie (yellow card) 21'; Meraz 79'	Report	Kirkbride (yellow card) 4'	Stadium: Transamerica Field; Attendance: 1,295; Referee: Scott Johnson

November 11, 2012 Final	#19 VCU	0–3	#25 Saint Louis	Charlotte, NC
16:00 EST	Arbelaez (yellow card) 44'	Report	Bryce 5'; Graydon (yellow card) 10'; Gabeljic 33'; Hildalgo 57'	Stadium: Transamerica Field; Attendance: 251; Referee: Mark Kadlecik

=== NCAA Tournament ===
November 18, 2012 Second round	Syracuse	3–2 (a.e.t.)	#19 (#14) VCU	Richmond, Virginia
19:00 EST	Clark 21' (yellow card) 30' 108'; Stamoulacatos 30'	Report	Solano 9'; Castillo 14' (pen.); Bowie (yellow card) 29'	Stadium: Sports Backers Stadium; Attendance: 899; Referee: Peter Dhima

== Statistics ==
=== Appearances and goals ===
Last updated on October 16, 2012.

No.	Pos	Nat	Player	Total		Regular season		A-10 Tournament		NCAA Tournament	
No.	Pos	Nat	Player	Apps	Goals	Apps	Goals	Apps	Goals	Apps	Goals
1	GK	(United States) USA	Clark Hankins	1	0	1+0	0	0+0	0	0+0	0
2	DF	(United States) USA	Isaac Owusu	0	0	0+0	0	0+0	0	0+0	0
