= 2012 Atlantic 10 Conference men's soccer season =

- League: NCAA Division I
- Sport: Soccer
- Duration: August, 2012 – November, 2012

Tournament
- Champions: Saint Louis
- Runners-up: VCU

A-10 men's soccer seasons
- ← 2011 2013 →

2012 Atlantic 10 Conference men's soccer standings
	Conf.					Overall
Team	W		L		T	W		L		T
No. 23 Charlotte	7	–	1	–	1	15	–	4	–	3
No. 19 Saint Louis†	7	–	2	–	0	16	–	5	–	0
Xavier	6	–	1	–	2	14	–	3	–	5
No. 25 VCU	6	–	1	–	2	12	–	4	–	5
Temple	6	–	1	–	2	10	–	6	–	3
Dayton	5	–	3	–	1	11	–	5	–	2
La Salle	4	–	4	–	1	10	–	7	–	3
Duquesne	4	–	4	–	1	7	–	12	–	1
Butler	3	–	5	–	1	5	–	8	–	5
Rhode Island	3	–	5	–	1	4	–	11	–	3
St. Bonaventure	3	–	6	–	0	5	–	14	–	0
Fordham	2	–	4	–	3	6	–	7	–	4
Richmond	2	–	6	–	1	6	–	11	–	1
Massachusetts	2	–	7	–	0	5	–	11	–	2
George Washington	2	–	7	–	0	5	–	13	–	0
Saint Joseph's	1	–	6	–	2	5	–	11	–	2
As of December 11, 2012; Rankings from NCSAA

The 2012 Atlantic 10 Conference men's soccer season was the 26th season for the Conference fielding men's NCAA Division I men's college soccer. Interconference play began on October 5, and continued through November 4. The season culminated with the 2012 Atlantic 10 Men's Soccer Tournament, where the top schools in the conference competed for a guaranteed berth into the 2012 NCAA Division I Men's Soccer Championship.

The defending regular season champions were the national finalists, Charlotte. The defending tournament winners were Xavier.

This was the last men's soccer season for Richmond, which dropped the sport (along with men's track) after announcing it would add men's lacrosse in the near future.

== Changes from 2011 ==
- Butler Bulldogs and VCU Rams join the conference after playing in the Horizon League and Colonial Athletic Association, respectively.

== Season outlook ==
=== Preseason polls ===
	Template Conf. Media
1.	Charlotte
2.	Xavier
3.	VCU
4.	Saint Louis
5.	Fordham
6.	George Washington
7.	Butler
7.	La Salle
9.	Duquesne
10.	Dayton
11.	Temple
12.	Rhode Island
13.	UMass
14.	Richmond
15.	St. Bonaventure
16.	Saint Joseph's

== Teams ==
=== Stadiums and locations ===
Team	Location	Stadium	Capacity
Butler Bulldogs	Indianapolis, Indiana	Butler Bowl	7,500
Charlotte 49ers	Charlotte, North Carolina	Transamerica Field	4,000
Dayton Flyers	Dayton, Ohio	Baujan Field	2,000
Duquesne Dukes	Pittsburgh, Pennsylvania	Rooney Field	2,200
George Washington Colonials	Washington, D.C.	Mount Vernon Athletic Complex	1,000
La Salle Explorers	Philadelphia, Pennsylvania	McCarthy Stadium	7,500
UMass Minutemen	Amherst, Massachusetts	Rudd Field	800
Rhode Island Rams	Kingston, Rhode Island	URI Soccer Complex	1,547
Richmond Spiders	Richmond, Virginia	Robins Stadium	8,700
St. Bonaventure Bonnies	St. Bonaventure, New York	McGraw-Jennings Field	2,000
Saint Joseph's Hawks	Philadelphia, Pennsylvania	Finnesey Field	600
Saint Louis Billikens	St. Louis, Missouri	Hermann Stadium	6,050
Temple Owls	Philadelphia, Pennsylvania	Ambler Field	500
VCU Rams	Richmond, Virginia	Sports Backers Stadium	3,250
Xavier Musketeers	Cincinnati, Ohio	Xavier University Soccer Complex	200

== Standings ==
2012 Atlantic 10 Conference men's soccer standings
	Conf.					Overall
Team	W		L		T	W		L		T
No. 23 Charlotte	7	–	1	–	1	15	–	4	–	3
No. 19 Saint Louis†	7	–	2	–	0	16	–	5	–	0
Xavier	6	–	1	–	2	14	–	3	–	5
No. 25 VCU	6	–	1	–	2	12	–	4	–	5
Temple	6	–	1	–	2	10	–	6	–	3
Dayton	5	–	3	–	1	11	–	5	–	2
La Salle	4	–	4	–	1	10	–	7	–	3
Duquesne	4	–	4	–	1	7	–	12	–	1
Butler	3	–	5	–	1	5	–	8	–	5
Rhode Island	3	–	5	–	1	4	–	11	–	3
St. Bonaventure	3	–	6	–	0	5	–	14	–	0
Fordham	2	–	4	–	3	6	–	7	–	4
Richmond	2	–	6	–	1	6	–	11	–	1
Massachusetts	2	–	7	–	0	5	–	11	–	2
George Washington	2	–	7	–	0	5	–	13	–	0
Saint Joseph's	1	–	6	–	2	5	–	11	–	2
As of December 11, 2012; Rankings from NCSAA

== Statistics ==
As of October 8, 2012.

=== Top scorers ===
Rank	Player	Nation	College	Goals
1	Luke Spencer	USA	Xavier Musketeers	9
2	Jason Johnson	JAM	VCU Rams	8
2	Joshua Patterson	USA	Duquesne Dukes	8
4	Jared Martinelli	USA	Temple Owls	6
5	Mike Casey	USA	Rhode Island Rams	5
5	Daniel Berko	GHA	Dayton Flyers	5
5	Robbie Kristo	USA	Saint Louis Billikens	5

=== Top assists ===
Rank	Player	Nation	Club	Assists
1	Jared Martinelli	USA	Temple Owls	7
1	Matt Walker	USA	Xavier Musketeers	7
3	Vaughn Spurrier	USA	Temple Owls	6
4	Abe Keller	SUI	Dayton Flyers	5

== See also ==
- Atlantic 10 Conference
- 2012 in American soccer
- 2012 NCAA Division I men's soccer season
