= 2012 NCAA Division I men's soccer tournament =

Men's College Cup (semifinals & final)

Tournament details
- Country: United States
- Teams: 48

Final positions
- Champions: Indiana
- Runners-up: Georgetown
- Semifinalists: Creighton; Maryland

Tournament statistics
- Matches played: 47
- Goals scored: 123 (2.62 per match)
- Top goal scorer: Nikita Kotlov (5)

Awards
- Best player: Steve Neumann, Georgetown (Offensive); Luis Soffner, Indiana (Defensive)

The 2012 NCAA Division I men's soccer tournament is a single-elimination tournament involving 48 teams to determine the champion of the 2012 NCAA Division I men's soccer season. It was the 54th edition of the tournament. Indiana defeated Georgetown, 1–0, to win its 8th national title.

== Qualified Teams ==
A total of 48 teams will qualify into the tournament proper, either automatically, or through an at-large bid that is determined by a selection committee. Each conference that field varsity soccer teams are admitted one automatic berth into the tournament. Depending on the conference, that automatic berth is either given the champions of the regular season, or the tournament that culminates the regular season. Twenty-two teams earn automatic bids into the tournament, while 26 enter through an at-large bid.

== Format ==
Like previous editions of the NCAA Division I Tournament, the tournament will feature 48 participants out of a possible field of 198 teams. Of the 48 berths, 22 are allocated to the conference tournament or regular season winners. The remaining 26 berths are determined through an at-large process based upon teams' Ratings Percentage Index that did not win their conference tournament.

From there, the NCAA Selection Committee selects the top sixteen seeds for the tournament, that earn an automatic bye to the second round of the tournament. The remaining 32 teams play in a single-elimination match in the first round of the tournament, to play a seeded team in the second round.

=== Seeded teams ===
Seeded teams
| Seed | School | Conference | Record | Berth type |
| 1 | Notre Dame | Big East | 16–3–1 | Automatic ^{A} |
| 2 | Maryland | ACC | 17–1–2 | Automatic ^{A} |
| 3 | Georgetown | Big East | 17–3–1 | At-large |
| 4 | Connecticut | Big East | 15–3–1 | At-large |
| 5 | Akron | MAC | 17–1–2 | Automatic ^{A} |
| 6 | UCLA | Pac-12 | 13–2–3 | Automatic ^{B} |
| 7 | Marquette | Big East | 16–3–1 | At-large |
| 8 | Saint Louis | A-10 | 16–4–0 | Automatic ^{A} |
| 9 | North Carolina | ACC | 15–3–2 | At-large |
| 10 | Louisville | Big East | 12–5–1 | At-large |
| 11 | Tulsa | C-USA | 13–5–1 | At-large |
| 12 | Creighton | MVC | 15–3–2 | Automatic ^{A} |
| 13 | New Mexico | MPSF | 16–3–1 | At-large |
| 14 | VCU | A-10 | 12–3–5 | At-large |
| 15 | Wake Forest | ACC | 11–3–5 | At-large |
| 16 | Indiana | Big Ten | 11–5–3 | At-large |

- Automatic ^{A} = Conference tournament winner.
- Automatic ^{B} = Conference regular season champion, conference has no tournament.

== Schedule ==
| Round | Date |
|---|---|
| First round | November 15, 2012 |
| Second round | November 18, 2012 |
| Third round | November 25, 2012 |
| Quarterfinals | November 30-December 2, 2012 |
| College Cup: Semifinals | December 7, 2012 |
| College Cup Final | December 9, 2012 |

== Bracket ==
=== Regional 1 ===
First round
Cleveland State | 1
Michigan State | 2
Xavier | 1
Kentucky | 0
Md.-Baltimore Co. | 0(4)
Old Dominion | 0(2)
Fairleigh Dickinson | 1
St. John's | 0

Second round
Michigan State | 0
1 | Notre Dame | 3
16 | Indiana | 4
Xavier | 1
Md.-Baltimore Co. | 0(2)
9 | North Carolina | 0(4)
8 | Saint Louis | 1
Fairleigh Dickinson | 2/2OT

Third round
1 | Notre Dame | 1
16 | Indiana | 2/2OT
9 | North Carolina | 1
Fairleigh Dickinson | 0/OT

Quarterfinals
16 | Indiana | 1
9 | North Carolina | 0

=== Regional 2 ===
First round
Niagara | 1
Michigan | 3
Air Force | 0
Washington | 1
Lafayette | 0
Virginia | 1
Boston College | 0
Northeastern | 1

Second round
Michigan | 1
5 | Akron | 2
12 | Creighton | 4
Washington | 2
Virginia | 1
13 | New Mexico | 3
4 | Connecticut | 1
Northeastern | 0

Third round
5 | Akron | 1(4)
12 | Creighton | 1(5)
13 | New Mexico | 1
4 | Connecticut | 2/2OT

Quarterfinals
12 | Creighton | 1
4 | Connecticut | 0

=== Regional 3 ===
First round
UAB | 2
Charlotte | 3
Syracuse | 1
Cornell | 0
Florida Gulf Coast | 0(3)
South Florida | 0(5)
San Diego | 2/2OT
Cal State Northridge | 1

Second round
Charlotte | 0
3 | Georgetown | 1
14 | VCU | 2
Syracuse | 3/2OT
South Florida | 0
11 | Tulsa | 1/OT
6 | UCLA | 2
San Diego | 5

Third round
3 | Georgetown | 1(4)
Syracuse | 1(2)
11 | Tulsa | 1
San Diego | 2

Quarterfinals
3 | Georgetown | 3
San Diego | 1

=== Regional 4 ===
First round
Western Illinois | 0
Northwestern | 1
Winthrop | 1(3)
Southern Methodist | 1(1)
Elon | 0
Coastal Carolina | 3
Brown | 2
Drexel | 0

Second round
Northwestern | 1
7 | Marquette | 0
10 | Louisville | 5
Winthrop | 0
Coastal Carolina | 2/OT
15 | Wake Forest | 1
2 | Maryland | 2
Brown | 1

Third round
Northwestern | 1
10 | Louisville | 2
Coastal Carolina | 1
2 | Maryland | 5

Quarterfinals
10 | Louisville | 1
2 | Maryland | 3

=== College Cup – Regions Park, Hoover, Alabama ===
National Semifinals; December 7
16 | Indiana | 1
12 | Creighton | 0
3 | Georgetown | 4(4)
2 | Maryland | 4(3)

National Championship; December 9
16 | Indiana | 1
3 | Georgetown | 0

== Results ==
=== First round ===
| November 15, 2012 | Cleveland State | 1–2 | Michigan State | East Lansing, MI |
| 1:00 PM EST | Arboleda 87' | Report | Montague 13'; Wilson 20' | Stadium: DeMartin Soccer Complex; Attendance: 957; Referee: Hilario Grajeda |

| November 15, 2012 | Lafayette | 0–1 | Virginia | Charlottesville, VA |
| 1:30 PM EST | | Report | Bates 88' | Stadium: Klöckner Stadium; Attendance: 356; Referee: Mohammad Samadpour |

| November 15, 2012 | Brown | 2–0 | Drexel | Philadelphia, PA |
| 4:00 PM EST | McNamara 17'; Taylor 42' | Report | | Stadium: Vidas Athletic Complex; Attendance: 1,047 |

| November 15, 2012 | Boston College | 0–1 | Northeastern | Brookline, MA |
| 6:00 PM EST | | Report | Marini 14' | Stadium: Parsons Field; Attendance: 1,173; Referee: Lou Labbadia |

| November 15, 2012 | Xavier | 1–0 | Kentucky | Lexington, KY |
| 7:00 PM EST | Spencer 86' | Report | | Stadium: UK Soccer Complex; Attendance: 980; Referee: Douglas Wolff |

| November 15, 2012 | UMBC | 0–0 (a.e.t.) (4–2 p) | Old Dominion | Norfolk, VA |
| 7:00 PM EST | | Report | | Stadium: ODU Soccer Complex; Attendance: 558; Referee: Brandon Marion |
| | Penalties |
| | Kapor (penalty scored); Kansaye (penalty scored); Paddock (penalty missed); Dacres (penalty scored); Vaeth (penalty scored) | | (penalty missed) Francoz; (penalty scored) Harmon; (penalty missed) LeBlanc; (penalty scored) Militar |

| November 15, 2012 | Fairleigh Dickinson | 1–0 | St. John's | Jamaica, NY |
| 7:00 PM EST | Moore 36' | Report | | Stadium: Belson Stadium; Attendance: 703; Referee: Noel Cotterell |

| November 15, 2012 | Niagara | 1–3 | Michigan | Ann Arbor, MI |
| 7:00 PM EST | da Cruz 59' | Report | Pereira 66', 68', 73' | Stadium: U-M Soccer Stadium; Attendance: 516; Referee: Shane Butler |

| November 15, 2012 | UAB | 2–3 | Charlotte | Charlotte, NC |
| 7:00 PM EST | Lemez 50'; Navarrete 85' | Report | Rex 7', 29'; Gentile 52' | Stadium: Transamerica Field; Attendance: 1,062; Referee: Jeffery Muschik |

| November 15, 2012 | Syracuse | 1–0 | Cornell | Ithaca, NY |
| 7:00 PM EST | Müller 10' | Report | | Stadium: Berman Field; Attendance: 1,504; Referee: Shane Magaris |

| November 15, 2012 | Florida Gulf Coast | 0–0 (a.e.t.) (3–5 p) | South Florida | Tampa, FL |
| 7:00 PM EST | | Report | | Stadium: Corbett Soccer Stadium; Attendance: 1,379; Referee: Jonathan Weiner |
| | Penalties |
| | Navas (penalty scored); Guillen (penalty missed); Silva (penalty scored); Crespo (penalty scored) | | Olali (penalty scored); Baldin (penalty scored); Hernandez (penalty scored); Fairclough (penalty scored); Paul (penalty scored) |

| November 15, 2012 | Elon | 0–3 | Coastal Carolina | Conway, SC |
| 7:00 PM EST | | Report | Ribeiro 42', 59'; Risher 70' | Stadium: CCU Soccer Field; Attendance: 334; Referee: Bill Dittmar |

| November 15, 2012 | Western Illinois | 0–1 | Northwestern | Evanston, IL |
| 8:00 PM EST | | Report | Gendron 63' | Stadium: Lakeside Field; Attendance: 502; Referee: Jorge Cuate |

| November 15, 2012 | Winthrop | 1–1 (a.e.t.) (3–1 p) | SMU | University Park, TX |
| 8:00 PM EST | Obougou 88' | Report | Puskarich 48' | Stadium: Westcott Field; Attendance: 456; Referee: Jorge Luna Hernandez |
| | Penalties |
| | Isern (penalty scored); Obougou (penalty missed); Lluch (penalty scored); Mort (penalty scored) | | (penalty missed) Lujano; (penalty missed) Puskarich; (penalty scored) Morales; (penalty missed) King |

| November 15, 2012 | Air Force | 0–1 | Washington | Seattle, WA |
| 10:00 PM EST | | Report | Harris 15' | Stadium: Husky Soccer Stadium; Attendance: 792; Referee: Ali Hancock |

| November 15, 2012 | San Diego | 2–1 | Cal State Northridge | Northridge, CA |
| 10:00 PM EST | Delgado 89'; Brandt 104' | Report | Lev-Ari 73' | Stadium: Matador Soccer Field; Attendance: 635; Referee: Chris Penso |

=== Second round ===
| November 18, 2012 | Xavier | 1–4 | #16 Indiana | Bloomington, IN |
| 1:00 PM EST | M. Walker 33' | Report | Kotlov 18', 68', 83'; Hollinger-Janzen 80' | Stadium: Armstrong Stadium; Attendance: 1,161; Referee: Hilario Grajeda |

| November 18, 2012 | Northeastern | 0–1 | #4 Connecticut | Storrs, CT |
| 1:00 PM EST | | Report | Diouf 24' | Stadium: Morrone Stadium; Attendance: 4,675; Referee: John McCloskey |

| November 18, 2012 | Charlotte | 0–1 | #3 Georgetown | Washington, DC |
| 1:00 PM EST | | Report | Allen 43' | Stadium: North Kehoe Field; Attendance: 859; Referee: Mark Kadlecik |

| November 18, 2012 | Michigan State | 0–3 | #1 Notre Dame | Notre Dame, IN |
| 2:00 PM EST | | Report | H. Shipp 33'; Finley 44'; Lachowecki 80' | Stadium: Alumni Stadium; Attendance: 1,410; Referee: Landis Wiley |

| November 18, 2012 | Fairleigh Dickinson | 2–1 (a.e.t.) | #8 Saint Louis | St. Louis, MO |
| 3:00 PM EST | Aubert 56'; McVey 103' | Report | Kristo 73' | Stadium: Hermann Stadium; Attendance: 2,042; Referee: Abbey Okulaja |

| November 18, 2012 | Michigan | 1–2 | #5 Akron | Akron, OH |
| 4:30 PM EST | Murphy 62' | Report | Stevenson 43'; Schmitt 59' | Stadium: FirstEnergy Stadium; Attendance: 3,264; Referee: Edvin Jurisevic |

| November 18, 2012 | Coastal Carolina | 2–1 (a.e.t.) | #15 Wake Forest | Winston-Salem, NC |
| 5:00 PM EST | Portillo 65'; Štourač 99' | Report | Gamble 4' | Stadium: Spry Stadium; Attendance: 746; Referee: Mark Gorak |

| November 18, 2012 | UMBC | 0–0 (a.e.t.) (2–3 p) | #9 North Carolina | Chapel Hill, NC |
| 5:00 PM EST | | Report | | Stadium: Fetzer Field; Attendance: 707; Referee: Andrew Chapin |
| | Penalties |
| | Kapor (penalty missed); Kansaye (penalty scored); Paddock (penalty scored); Dacres (penalty missed); Vaeth (penalty missed) | | (penalty scored) Brown; (penalty scored) Murphy; (penalty scored) Walters; (penalty missed) Walden |

| November 18, 2012 | Brown | 1–2 | #2 Maryland | College Park, MD |
| 5:00 PM EST | Belair 16' | Report | Mullins 44'; Metzger 90' | Stadium: Ludwig Field; Attendance: 1,663; Referee: Dan Fitzgerald |

| November 18, 2012 | Northwestern | 1–0 | #7 Marquette | Milwaukee, WI |
| 5:00 PM EST | Calistri 31' | Report | | Stadium: Valley Fields; Attendance: 1,186; Referee: Fotis Bazakos |

| November 18, 2012 | Washington | 2–4 | #12 Creighton | Omaha, NE |
| 6:00 PM EST | Moberg 48'; Tucker-Gangnes 89' | Report | Kallman 6'; Pitter 55'; Ribeiro 66'; Blandon 86' | Stadium: Morrison Stadium; Attendance: 1,681; Referee: Terry Vaughn |

| November 18, 2012 | #11 Tulsa | 1–0 (a.e.t.) | South Florida | Tampa, FL |
| 6:00 PM EST | O. Mata 99' | Report | | Stadium: Corbett Soccer Stadium; Attendance: 2,663; Referee: Lance VanHaitsma |

| November 18, 2012 | Syracuse | 3–2 (a.e.t.) | #14 VCU | Richmond, VA |
| 7:00 PM EST | Clark 21' 108'; Stamoulacatos 30' | Report | Solano 9'; Castillo 14' (pen.) | Stadium: Sports Backers Stadium; Attendance: 899; Referee: Peter Dhima |

| November 18, 2012 | Winthrop | 0–5 | #10 Louisville | Louisville, KY |
| 7:00 PM EST | | Report | Cochrane 1'; Mares 34', 49', 64'; Foxhoven 81' | Stadium: Cardinal Park Soccer and Track Stadium; Attendance: 1,456; Referee: Kevin Terry |

| November 18, 2012 | San Diego | 5–2 | #6 UCLA | Los Angeles, CA |
| 8:00 PM EST | Brandt 31'; Lopez 52'; Wallen 66', 67'; Cohn 78' | Report | Hollingshead 10'; Raynr 54' | Stadium: Drake Stadium; Attendance: 682; Referee: Juan Guzman |

| November 18, 2012 | Virginia | 1–3 | #13 New Mexico | Albuquerque, NM |
| 9:00 PM EST | Brown 48' | Report | Venter 6'; Rogers 58'; Calderón 90' | Stadium: UNM Soccer Complex; Attendance: 3,121; Referee: Alex Gorrin |

=== Third round ===
| November 25, 2012 | #13 New Mexico | 1–2 (a.e.t.) | #4 Connecticut | Storrs, CT |
| 1:00 PM EST | Sandoval 32' | Report | Diouf 76'; Zuniga 105' | Stadium: Morrone Stadium; Attendance: 4,315; Referee: Mark Kadlecik |

| November 25, 2012 | Syracuse | 1–1 (a.e.t.) (2–4 p) | #3 Georgetown | Washington, DC |
| 1:00 PM EST | Vale 29' | Report | Allen 85' | Stadium: North Kehoe Field; Attendance: 970; Referee: Daniel Fitzgerald |
| | Penalties |
| | Pasanen (penalty missed); Perea (penalty scored); Brode (penalty scored); Murrell (penalty missed) | | (penalty scored) Neumann; (penalty scored) Christianson; (penalty scored) Riemer; (penalty scored) Nealis |

| November 25, 2012 | #16 Indiana | 2–1 (a.e.t.) | #1 Notre Dame | Notre Dame, IN |
| 3:00 PM EST | Kotlov 55'; Zavaleta 102' | Report | Richard 54' | Stadium: Alumni Stadium; Attendance: 1,242; Referee: Brent Sorg |

| November 25, 2012 | #12 Creighton | 1–1 (a.e.t.) (5–4 p) | #5 Akron | Akron, OH |
| 4:30 PM EST | Pitter 83' | Report | Brenes 12' | Stadium: FirstEnergy Stadium; Attendance: 2,778; Referee: Chris Penso |
| | Penalties |
| | Castro (penalty scored); Ribeiro (penalty scored); Makh (penalty scored); Barnes (penalty scored); Pitter (penalty scored) | | (penalty scored) Caldwell; (penalty scored) Brenes; (penalty scored) Stevenson; (penalty missed) Trapp; (penalty scored) Quinn |

| November 25, 2012 | Coastal Carolina | 1–5 | #2 Maryland | College Park, MD |
| 5:00 PM EST | Bennett 21' | Report | Eticha 13'; Mullins 22'; Jane 60', 64'; Raley 86' | Stadium: Ludwig Field; Attendance: 1,847 |

| November 25, 2012 | Fairleigh Dickinson | 0–1 (a.e.t.) | #9 North Carolina | Chapel Hill, NC |
| 5:00 PM EST | | Report | Brown 92' | Stadium: Fetzer Field; Attendance: 750; Referee: Peter Dhima |

| November 25, 2012 | San Diego | 2–1 | #11 Tulsa | Tulsa, OK |
| 6:00 PM EST | McFadden 63'; Brandt 68' | Report | C. Mata 13' | Stadium: Hurricane Soccer & Track Stadium; Attendance: 1,022; Referee: Misail Tsapos |

| November 25, 2012 | Northwestern | 1–2 | #10 Louisville | Louisville, KY |
| 7:00 PM EST | Baughman 5' | Report | Hairston 3'; Wilson 87' (o.g.) | Stadium: Cardinal Park Soccer and Track Stadium; Attendance: 1,739; Referee: Douglas Wolff |

=== Quarterfinals ===
| November 30, 2012 | #16 Indiana | 1–0 | #9 North Carolina | Chapel Hill, NC |
| 6:00 EST | Zavaleta 60' | Report | | Stadium: Fetzer Field; Attendance: 4,352; Referee: Edvin Jurisevic |

| December 1, 2012 | San Diego | 1–3 | #3 Georgetown | Washington, DC |
| 1:00 EST | Ringhof 50' | Report | OG 51'; Snoh 73'; Riemer 88' | Stadium: North Kehoe Field; Attendance: 1,927; Referee: John McCloskey |

| December 1, 2012 | #10 Louisville | 1–3 | #2 Maryland | College Park, MD |
| 5:00 EST | Foxhoven 40' | Report | Woodberry 34'; Pace 45'; Mullins 68' | Stadium: Ludwig Field; Attendance: 3,556; Referee: Lou Labbadia |

| December 2, 2012 | #12 Creighton | 1–0 | #4 Connecticut | Storrs, CT |
| 1:00 EST | Blandon 89' | Report | | Stadium: Morrone Stadium; Attendance: 5,100; Referee: Fotis Bazokis |

=== College Cup ===
==== Semifinals ====
| December 7, 2012 | #3 Georgetown | 4–4 (a.e.t.) (4–3 p) | #2 Maryland | Hoover, AL |
| 5:00 PM EST | Neumann 33', 34', 61'; Allen 48' | Report | Tshuma 22', 59'; Mullins 74'; François 76' | Stadium: Regions Park; Attendance: 11,074; Referee: Chris Penso |
| | Penalties |
| | Neumann (penalty scored); Muller (penalty missed); Christianson (penalty scored); Riemer (penalty scored); Nealis (penalty scored) | | (penalty scored) Stertzer; (penalty scored) Woodberry; (penalty scored) Mullins; (penalty missed) Kemp; (penalty missed) Leikvang |

| December 7, 2012 | #16 Indiana | 1–0 | #12 Creighton | Hoover, AL |
| 7:30 PM EST | Hollinger-Janzen 27' | Report | | Stadium: Regions Park; Attendance: 11,074; Referee: Edvin Juresvic |

==== Championship ====
| December 9, 2012 | #16 Indiana | 1–0 | #3 Georgetown | Hoover, AL |
| 2:00 PM EST | Kotlov 64' | Report | | Stadium: Regions Park; Attendance: 9,242; Referee: Hilario Grajeda |

== Statistics ==
=== Goalscorers ===
A total of 123 goals were scored over 47 matches, for an average of 2.62 goals per match.

5 goals

- (United States) Nikita Kotlov – Indiana

4 goals

- (United States) Patrick Mullins – Maryland

3 goals

- (United States) Brandon Allen – Georgetown
- (United States) Steve Neumann – Georgetown
- (United States) Dylan Mares – Louisville
- (Brazil) Fabio Pereira – Michigan
- (United States) Connor Brandt – San Diego

2 goals

- (United States) Jennings Rex – Charlotte
- (Brazil) Pedro Ribeiro – Coastal Carolina
- (Senegal) Mamadou Diouf – Connecticut
- (Colombia) Christian Blandon – Creighton
- (Germany) Timo Pitter – Creighton
- (Benin) Femi Hollinger-Janzen – Indiana
- (United States) Eriq Zavaleta – Indiana
- (United States) Zach Foxhoven – Louisville
- (Lesotho) Sunny Jane – Maryland
- (Zimbabwe) Schillo Tshuma - Maryland
- (Sweden) Patrick Wallen – San Diego
- (England) Louis Clark – Syracuse

1 goal

- (Costa Rica) Reinaldo Brenes – Akron
- (United States) Thomas Schmitt – Akron
- (United States) Eric Stevenson – Akron
- (United States) Bobby Belair – Brown
- (United States) Thomas McNamara – Brown
- (United States) Daniel Taylor – Brown
- (Israel) Sagi Lev-Ari – Cal State Northridge
- (United States) Giuseppe Gentile – Charlotte
- (Colombia) Cristian Arboleda – Cleveland State
- (Jamaica) Ashton Bennett – Coastal Carolina
- (United States) Justin Portillo – Coastal Carolina
- (United States) Matt Risher – Coastal Carolina
- (Czech Republic) Jakub Štourač – Coastal Carolina
- (United States) Nicholas Zuniga – Connecticut
- (United States) Brent Kallman – Creighton
- (United States) Andrew Ribeiro – Creighton
- (Norway) Jan Aubert – Fairleigh Dickinson
- (United States) Jack McVey – Fairleigh Dickinson
- (England) Anthony Moore – Fairleigh Dickinson
- (United States) Andy Reimer – Georgetown
- (United States) Melvin Snoh – Georgetown
- (United States) Greg Cochrane – Louisville
- (United States) Marlon Hairston – Louisville
- (Ethiopia) Mikias Eticha – Maryland
- (Haiti) Christiano François – Maryland
- (United States) Dan Metzger – Maryland
- (United States) Jake Pace – Maryland
- (United States) Jereme Raley – Maryland
- (United States) London Woodberry – Maryland
- (Republic of Ireland) James Murphy – Michigan
- (United States) Adam Montague – Michigan State
- (United States) Nick Wilson – Michigan State
- (Costa Rica) Michael Calderón – New Mexico
- (United States) James Rogers – New Mexico
- (United States) Devon Sandoval – New Mexico
- (United States) Kyle Venter – New Mexico
- (Canada) Bryan da Cruz – Niagara
- (United States) Cameron Brown – North Carolina
- (United States) Dante Marini – Northeastern
- (United States) Jarrett Baughman – Northwestern
- (United States) Joey Calistri – Northwestern
- (United States) Nick Gendron – Northwestern
- (United States) Ryan Finley – Notre Dame
- (United States) Max Lachowecki – Notre Dame
- (United States) Kyle Richard – Notre Dame
- (United States) Harry Shipp – Notre Dame
- (United States) James Cohn – San Diego
- (United States) Dan Delgado – San Diego
- (United States) Sergio Lopez – San Diego
- (United States) Conor McFadden – San Diego
- (Germany) Julian Ringhof – San Diego
- (United States) Robbie Kristo – Saint Louis
- (United States) Eddie Puskarich – Southern Methodist
- (Germany) Lars Müller – Syracuse
- (United States) Stefanos Stamoulacatos – Syracuse
- (New Zealand) Jordan Vale – Syracuse
- (United States) Cristian Mata – Tulsa
- (United States) Omar Mata – Tulsa
- (Serbia) Mladen Lemez – UAB
- (Chile) Diego Navarrete – UAB
- (United States) Ryan Hollingshead – UCLA
- (United States) Evan Raynr – UCLA
- (United States) Will Bates – Virginia
- (United States) Matt Brown – Virginia
- (Costa Rica) Dennis Castillo – VCU
- (Costa Rica) Juan Monge Solano – VCU
- (United States) Michael Gamble – Wake Forest
- (United States) Michael Harris – Washington
- (United States) James Moberg – Washington
- (United States) Dylan Tucker-Gangnes – Washington
- (Spain) Achille Obougou – Winthrop
- (United States) Luke Spencer – Xavier
- (United States) Matt Walker – Xavier

Own goals

- (United States) Grant Wilson – Northwestern (playing against Louisville)
- San Diego (playing against Georgetown)

== See also ==
- NCAA Men's Soccer Championship
- 2012 NCAA Division I men's soccer season
