= Edward McLaughlin =

Edward McLaughlin may refer to:

- Edward McLaughlin (gangster) (1917–1965), American boxer and a member of The McLaughlin Brothers gang
- Edward F. McLaughlin (1883–1953), American politician from Boston
- Edward F. McLaughlin Jr. (1920–2005), his son, American attorney and politician from Boston
- Edward R. McLaughlin (born 1928), member of the South Dakota House of Representatives

== See also ==
- Eddie McLaughlin (born 1980), rugby union player
- Ed McLaughlin, American athletic director
