= 2012 Atlantic 10 men's soccer tournament =

Soccer tournament season

Tournament details
- Country: United States
- Teams: 8

Final positions
- Champions: Saint Louis
- Runners-up: VCU

Tournament statistics
- Top goal scorer: Kingsley Bryce (3)

The 2012 Atlantic 10 Men's Soccer Tournament was the seventeenth edition of the tournament. The tournament decided the Atlantic 10 Conference champion for the 2012 season and guaranteed a representative into the 2012 NCAA Division I Men's Soccer Championship. The tournament was held from November 8–11.

== Qualification ==
2012 Atlantic 10 Conference men's soccer standings
	Conf.					Overall
Team	W		L		T	W		L		T
No. 23 Charlotte	7	–	1	–	1	15	–	4	–	3
No. 19 Saint Louis†	7	–	2	–	0	16	–	5	–	0
Xavier	6	–	1	–	2	14	–	3	–	5
No. 25 VCU	6	–	1	–	2	12	–	4	–	5
Temple	6	–	1	–	2	10	–	6	–	3
Dayton	5	–	3	–	1	11	–	5	–	2
La Salle	4	–	4	–	1	10	–	7	–	3
Duquesne	4	–	4	–	1	7	–	12	–	1
Butler	3	–	5	–	1	5	–	8	–	5
Rhode Island	3	–	5	–	1	4	–	11	–	3
St. Bonaventure	3	–	6	–	0	5	–	14	–	0
Fordham	2	–	4	–	3	6	–	7	–	4
Richmond	2	–	6	–	1	6	–	11	–	1
Massachusetts	2	–	7	–	0	5	–	11	–	2
George Washington	2	–	7	–	0	5	–	13	–	0
Saint Joseph's	1	–	6	–	2	5	–	11	–	2
As of December 11, 2012; Rankings from NCSAA

== Bracket ==
Quarterfinals
1	Charlotte	2
8	Duquesne	1
4	VCU	1
5	Temple	0
2	Saint Louis	3
7	La Salle	1
3	Xavier (PK's)	0 (3)
6	Dayton	0 (2)

Semifinals
1	Charlotte	0
4	VCU	1
2	Saint Louis	1
3	Xavier	0

Championship
4	VCU	0
2	Saint Louis	3

== Schedule ==
=== Quarterfinals ===
November 8, 2012	La Salle	1–3	Saint Louis	Charlotte, NC
11:00 ET	Plumhoff 79'	Report	Kristo 24'; Schakleford (yellow card) 31'; Bryce 86'; Sweetin 89'	Stadium: Transamerica Field; Attendance: 1,014; Referee: Jeffery Muschik

November 8, 2012	Dayton	1–1 (a.e.t.) (2–3 p)	Xavier	Charlotte, NC
14:00 ET	Berko 25'	Report	Walker 56'	Stadium: Transamerica Field; Attendance: 1,014; Referee: Andrew Chapin
	Penalties
	Jones (penalty scored); Keller (penalty scored); Acevedo (penalty missed); Berko (penalty missed); Enstone (penalty missed)		(penalty scored) Spencer; (penalty missed) De Paoli; (penalty scored) Hagglund; (penalty scored) Queree; (penalty missed) Cohen

November 8, 2012	Temple	0–1	VCU	Charlotte, NC
17:00 ET		Report	Meraz 90'	Stadium: Transamerica Field; Attendance: 1,014; Referee: Mark Garcia

November 8, 2012	Duquesne	1–2	Charlotte	Charlotte, NC
20:00 ET	Fiemawhle 15'; McCann (yellow card) 90'	Report	Rex 2'; Gibson 90'	Stadium: Transamerica Field; Attendance: 1,014; Referee: Saeed Mohomed

=== Semifinals ===
November 9, 2012	Xavier	0–1	Saint Louis	Charlotte, NC
17:00 ET	Hagglund (yellow card) 25'	Report	Bryce 82'	Stadium: Transamerica Field; Attendance: 1,295; Referee: Shaun Papperman

November 9, 2012	VCU	1–0	Charlotte	Charlotte, NC
19:30 ET	Bowie (yellow card) 21'; Meraz 79'	Report	Kirkbride (yellow card) 4'	Stadium: Transamerica Field; Attendance: 1,295; Referee: Scott Johnson

=== A-10 Championship ===
November 11, 2012	VCU	0–3	Saint Louis	Charlotte, NC
16:00 ET	Arbelaez (yellow card) 44'	Report	Bryce 5'; Graydon (yellow card) 10'; Gabeljic 33'; Hildalgo 57'	Stadium: Transamerica Field; Attendance: 251; Referee: Mark Kadlecik

== See also ==
- Atlantic 10 Conference
- 2012 Atlantic 10 Conference men's soccer season
- 2012 NCAA Division I men's soccer season
- 2012 NCAA Division I Men's Soccer Championship
