= VCU Rams =

University athletic teams in Virginia, US

- University: Virginia Commonwealth University
- Nickname: Rams
- NCAA: Division I
- Conference: Atlantic 10
- Athletic director: Ed McLaughlin
- Location: Richmond, Virginia
- Varsity teams: 16
- Basketball arena: Stuart C. Siegel Center
- Baseball stadium: The Diamond
- Soccer stadium: Sports Backers Stadium
- Colors: Black and gold
- Mascot: Rodney The Ram
- Website: vcuathletics.com
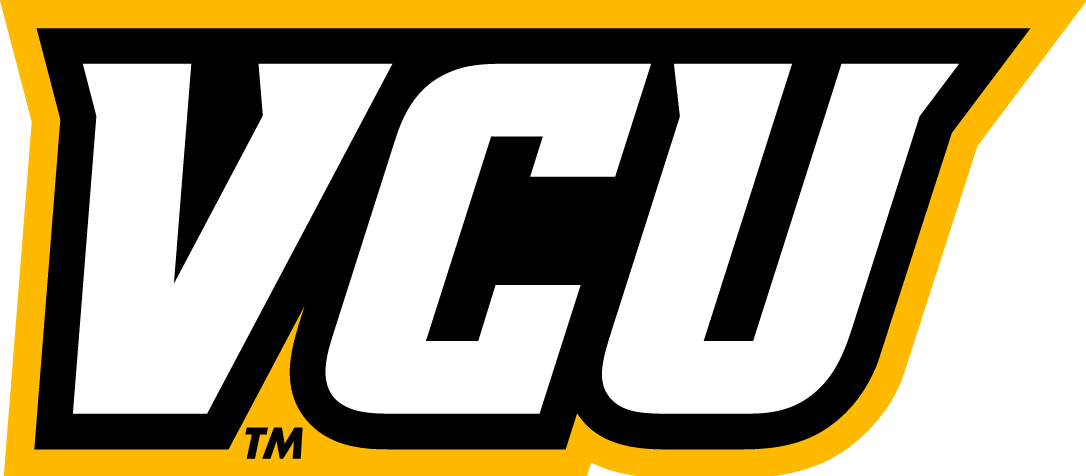

The VCU Rams are the athletic teams of Virginia Commonwealth University of Richmond, Virginia, United States. The Rams compete in Division I of the National Collegiate Athletic Association as members of the Atlantic 10 Conference. The most successful teams have been the men's tennis and basketball teams, which have had success in their conference and on the regional and national stages. The school's colors are black and gold. The athletic director is Ed McLaughlin. The official student supporter group is known as the Rowdy Rams.

VCU was founded following the merger of the Medical College of Virginia and the Richmond Professional Institute in 1968. Prior to the VCU Rams, the MCV athletic teams competed as the Medicoes and the RPI athletic teams competed as the Green Devils.

== Sports sponsored ==
Atlantic 10 Conference logo in VCU gold

Men's sports	Women's sports
Baseball	Basketball
Basketball	Cross country
Cross country	Field hockey
Golf	Lacrosse
Soccer	Soccer
Tennis	Tennis
Track and field^{†}	Track and field^{†}
	Volleyball
† – Track and field includes both indoor and outdoor

A member of the Atlantic 10 Conference, Virginia Commonwealth University sponsors teams in seven men's and eight women's NCAA sanctioned sports.

=== Men's basketball ===
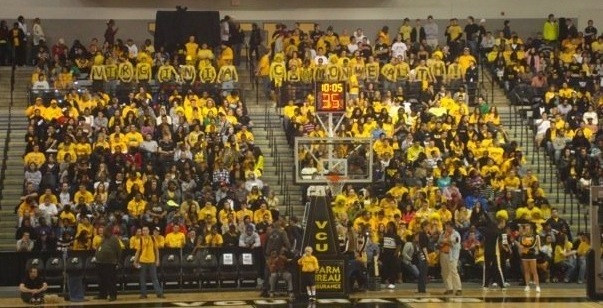
"Rowdy Ram" student fans cheer on the men's basketball team.

The Virginia Commonwealth University men's basketball team is widely regarded as one of the most popular and successful sports programs at the university. The first varsity basketball team was fielded in 1968, and coached by Benny Dees. The present head coach is Ryan Odom.

In the 2011 NCAA tournament, VCU qualified as an at-large bid, having to play in the newly formatted tournament's "First Four" against USC. The decision to allow VCU to participate in the tournament was widely criticized among pundits and the media. VCU defeated USC 59–46 in the "First Four" play-in game. VCU then went on to upset Georgetown 74–56 in the round of 64. The 11th-seeded VCU Rams then upset 3rd-seeded Purdue 94–76 to advance to the Sweet 16 for the first time in school history. In the sweet sixteen, VCU defeated 10th-seeded Florida State 72–71 on a last second bucket in overtime to advance to the Elite 8 for the first time in school history. VCU beat #1 seeded Kansas in the Southwest Regional final by a score of 71–61. It was the Rams' first trip to the Final Four. Against Butler in the Final Four, VCU lost 70–62, ending "one of the greatest Cinderella stories of all time." The VCU Rams finished 6th in the ESPN/USA Today Coaches Poll at the end of the season. This was the highest ranking in VCU's history and the highest ranking of any team from the CAA.

In 1985 NCAA Division I men's basketball tournament, VCU received an invitation to the NCAA men's basketball tournament as a #2 seed in its region, the highest seeding that the team has ever earned. However, it was upset in the second round of the tournament by #7 seed Alabama.

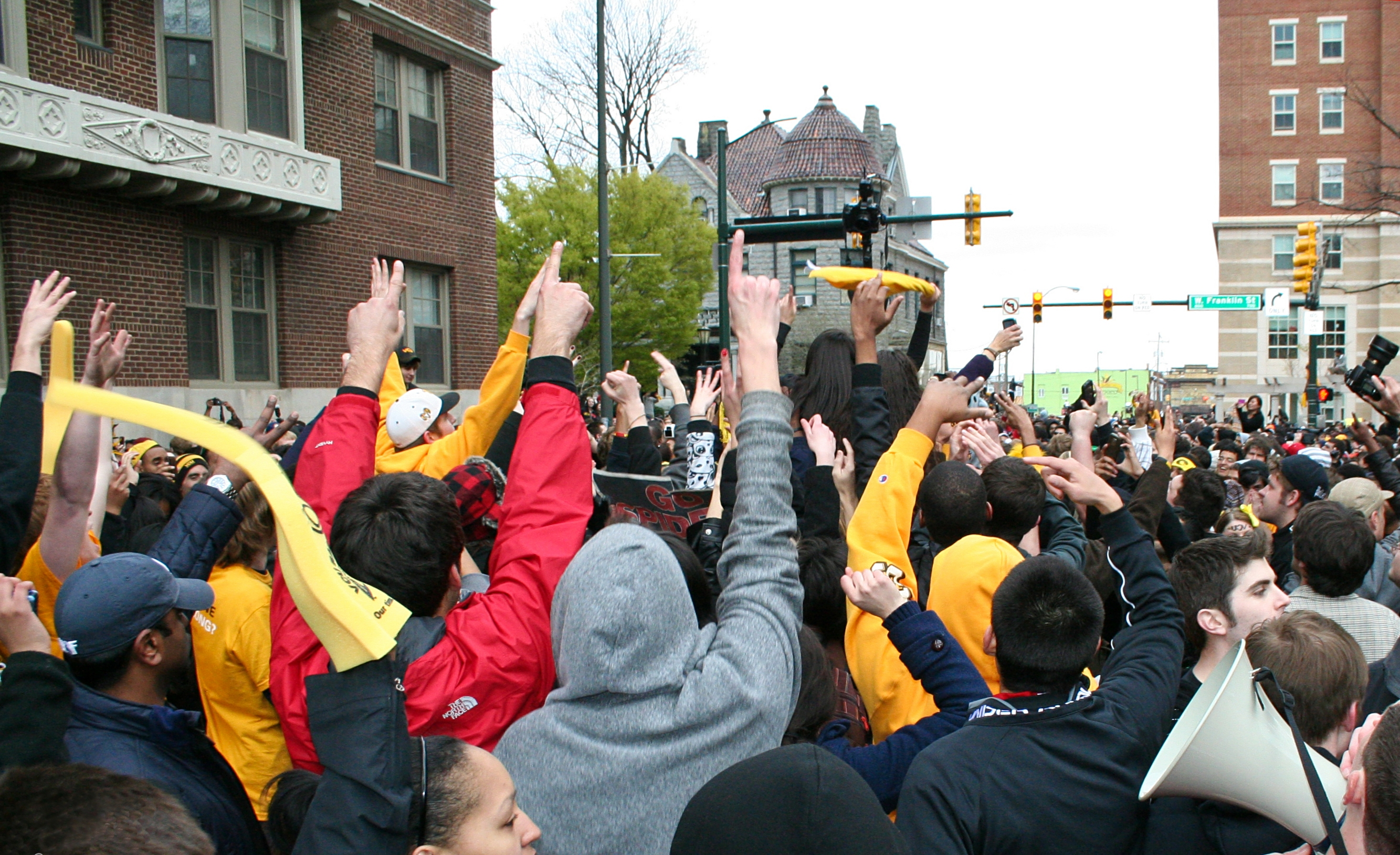
Students celebrate the men's basketball team's victory against Kansas in the Elite Eight.

Until 2006 the team was coached by Jeff Capel, who at the time of his promotion to head coach in 2002 was the youngest coach in Division I NCAA basketball at 27 years old. During his time with VCU, Capel compiled a 79–41 record (.658), and in his first year earned VCU 18 wins, the most ever for a first-year coach at the school. In April 2006, Capel announced his decision to coach the University of Oklahoma basketball team. He was replaced by Anthony Grant, formerly an assistant head coach with the 2006 NCAA champions, the University of Florida.

Regular season conference champs and first-seed VCU defeated sixth-seed George Mason in the CAA championship game on March 5, 2007, to receive an automatic bid to the 2007 NCAA Division I men's basketball tournament. The Rams defeated the Patriots in a close fought game 65–59 to set a school record for wins in a season, finishing 27–6. The Rams also set a mark for the most conference wins in the regular season by any team ever in the CAA, finishing their CAA campaign 16–2 in the regular season and 3–0 in the tournament. In the first round of the 2007 NCAA tourney the 11 seeded Rams upset 6 seeded Duke by Eric Maynor's game-winning buzzer-beater. VCU then lost in the second round to 3-seed Pitt in overtime.

The team is best known for its Final Four run in the 2011 NCAA Division I men's basketball tournament, the first time the Rams made it beyond the second round. The Rams' journey to the Final Four under coach Shaka Smart began in one of the four opening round games, commonly called "play-in" games, intended to narrow the field from 68 to 64 teams. Thus, VCU became the first team to advance from the "First Four" to the Final Four.

=== Women's basketball ===
Beth O'Boyle coaches the VCU Rams women's basketball team.

The VCU Rams women's team enjoyed the most successful season in their history in the 2008–2009 season. The team finished the season with a mark of 26–7 overall and a 15–3 conference record. Notably the team was a perfect 16–0 at home. After finishing second in their conference the team headed to their first ever NCAA tournament game as the 10th seed, where the #7 seeded Rutgers eliminated them 57–51 on their home court. In the 2009–2010 season head coach Beth Cunningham led the Rams to the WNIT Sweet Sixteen where they were eliminated by the Syracuse Orange.

=== Baseball ===
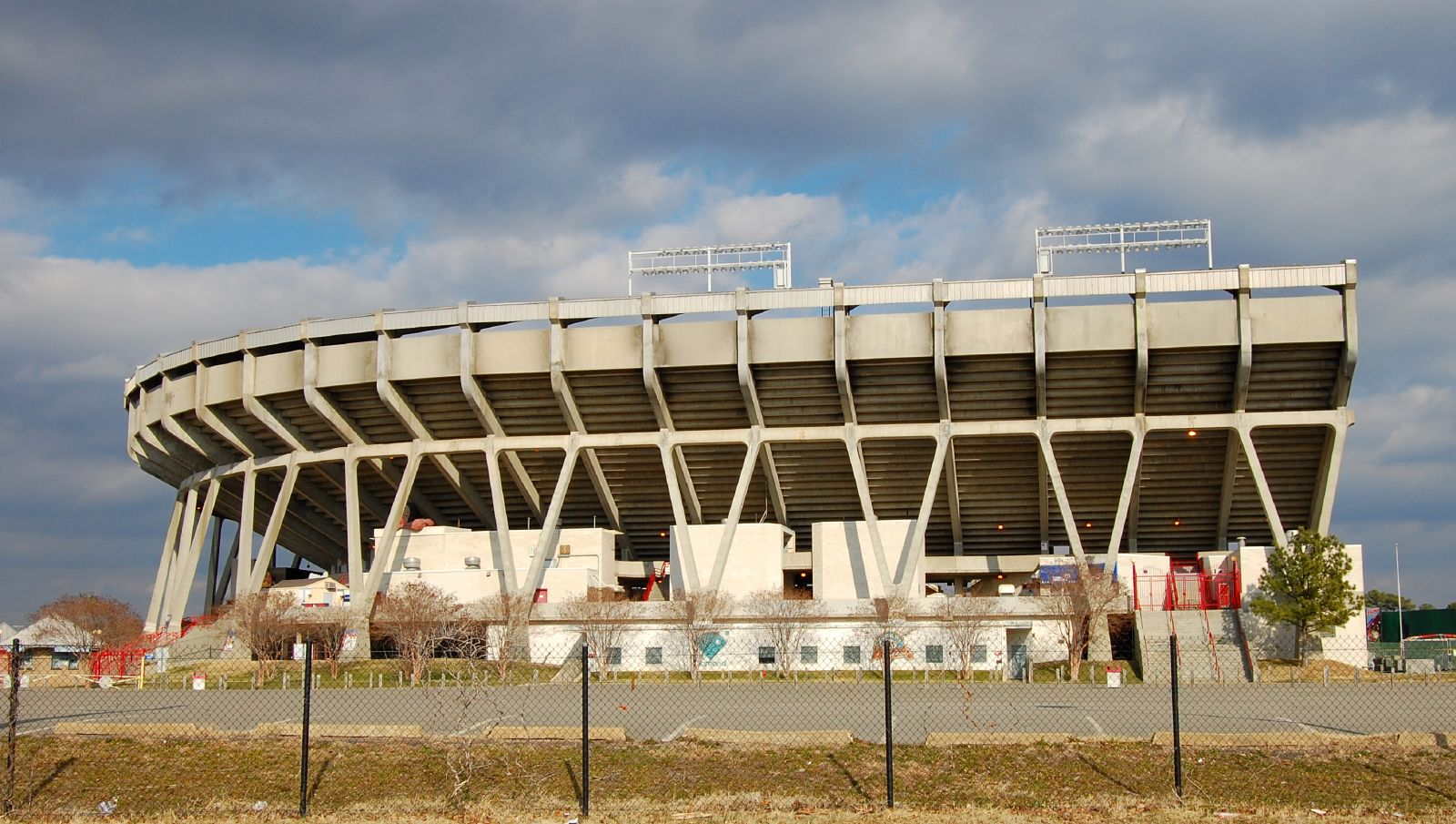
The VCU Rams baseball teams play at The Diamond.

VCU has fielded a baseball team since 1971. The program is led by Bradley LeCroy, who has managed the program since 2023. Since 2013, the Rams participate in the Atlantic 10 Conference in NCAA Division I baseball competitions.

The Rams play at The Diamond, located in central Richmond near the Chamberlayne Industrial Center and Scott's Addition neighborhoods. The Diamond is located on the same athletic complex as the Arthur Ashe Tennis Center, and Sports Backers Stadium, where the men's and women's soccer and track teams play.

During the 2006 MLB draft, three Rams were selected: Harold Mozingo, a right-handed pitch who was drafted by the Kansas City Royals; Scott Sizemore, drafted by the Detroit Tigers; and Michael Gibbs, who was drafted by the Colorado Rockies.

=== Men's soccer ===
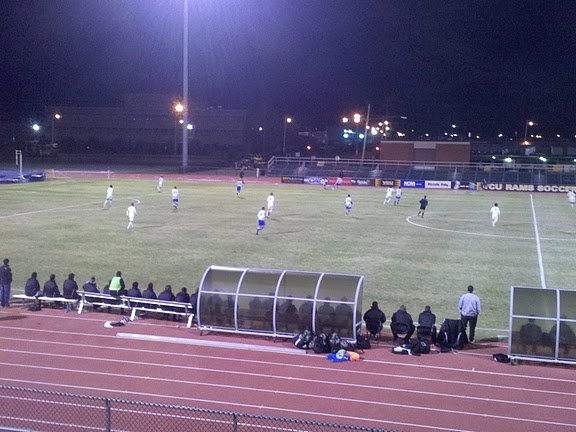
A VCU Rams men's soccer match vs. Delaware Fightin' Blue Hens at Sports Backers Stadium

Since 1978, the VCU Rams have fielded a men's varsity soccer program. The men's soccer team is coached by David Giffard, who has worked for the Akron Zips men's soccer program under Caleb Porter, who lead Akron to the 2010 NCAA College Cup title, and now coaches the Portland Timbers of Major League Soccer. Giffard has coached the team since 2010. In the Rams' 35 years of existence, the team has reached seven NCAA Tournaments, with all of them coming in the last 15 years. VCU's best finish in the NCAA Tournament came in 2004, when the Rams reached the quarterfinals of the tournament, where they fell to UC Santa Barbara.

The first 20 years of the men's soccer program were otherwise lackluster, as the team failed to reach the NCAA Tournament, nor win any conference tournaments. The first five seasons were led under Ben Satterfield, who failed to have a winning season at the helm of the team. Satterfield's successor, Roosevelt Lundy gave the Rams a few winning seasons in the mid-1980s but failed to give the team a berth into the NCAA Tournament. After the Lundy era came Lincoln Phillips who guided the Rams to the 1991 Metro Conference Men's Soccer Final, but failed to earn a bid into the NCAA Tournament.

In 1995, the program was led by Tim O'Sullivan, who would manage the varsity team for the next 15 seasons. During O'Sullivan's coaching career at VCU, he led the team to three Colonial Athletic Association tournament titles, and two CAA regular season titles. The team is coached by Dave Giffard who has worked as an assistant coach for the University of Akron Zips. Giffard has coached the team since 2010.

The team's most successful run in the College Cup, the men's NCAA Division I Soccer Tournament, came in 2004, where the Rams entered the tournament as ranked 16th in the nation, earning a bye to the second round proper. In the second round, the Rams defeated George Washington, before upsetting the number-one seeded, Wake Forest Demon Deacons in penalty kicks. Reaching the regional finals, or quarterfinals in the entire tournament, VCU lost to eventual national finalists, the UC Santa Barbara Gauchos.

Following a string of three consecutive seasons without a berth in the CAA tournament, Sullivan was fired to be subsequently replaced by Giffard. Giffard led the team to regular season runners-up in the CAA before falling in the playoff semifinals. His second season resulted in both a winning conference and overall record, and at one point being ranked for the first time since 2005, but failure to qualify for both the CAA and NCAA Tournaments.

During the 2012 season, VCU had their inaugural season in the Atlantic 10 Conference, finishing second in the 2012 Atlantic 10 Men's Soccer Tournament. In the tournament, the Rams knocked off the defending finalists, the Charlotte 49ers, before losing to the Saint Louis Billikens in the championship. Their success in the Atlantic 10 resulted in them being seeded 14th in the 2012 NCAA tournament, where they lost in the second round to the Syracuse Orange.

Following the 2012 season, Rams striker Jason Johnson was selected 13th overall in the 2013 MLS SuperDraft by Houston Dynamo.

=== Men's tennis ===
The VCU men's tennis team was ranked 14th pre-season by the International Tennis Association (ITA) in 2005, and has been nationally ranked in the top 50 since 1993. The Rams have had 13 straight NCAA tournament appearances and had won nine consecutive Colonial Athletic Association tournament crowns until being dethroned in the 2005 CAA tournament final by William and Mary. In 2000, the men's team reached the NCAA Finals after defeating Illinois (Quarterfinals) and Tennessee (Semifinals) respectively. In the finals, Stanford rallied to win the doubles and swept Virginia Commonwealth in the singles to claim its 17th NCAA men's tennis title 4–0.

=== Track & field ===
The VCU men's track team won the 2006 CAA Conference Championship after placing second in the CAA's in the previous 2 years. The team was led by Davion Lambert and James Frierson who were named the Field MVP and Track MVP respectively. The team is looking to be led to another CAA victory with some old and new faces at the CAA Championships this year.

=== Other sports ===
VCU Rams varsity logo.

The men's golf team has won 14 conference titles: Sun Belt (1990), Colonial (1996, 1997, 1998, 1999, 2000, 2001, 2002, 2009), and Atlantic 10 (2014, 2015, 2016, 2019, 2024).

=== Lacrosse ===
VCU announced they would be adding women’s lacrosse, as their 17th sport, in the Spring of 2012. Jen O’Brien was hired as the first head coach in August 2013. The team began collegiate play on February 14, 2016 earning a win over Gardner-Webb. In just their third year, on April 22, 2018, the VCU women’s lacrosse team defeated UMass, ending their 61 game Atlantic 10 conference win streak. For their efforts in 2018, O’Brien earned A10 Coach of the Year honors.

== Club teams ==
In addition to varsity athletics, Virginia Commonwealth University fields collegiate club sports, which are overseen by VCU Sport Clubs. These sports are not regulated by the National Collegiate Athletic Association (NCAA) or the National Association of Intercollegiate Athletics (NAIA), and are not a varsity sport.

Men's sports	Women's sports
Archery	Archery
Badminton	Badminton
Baseball	Basketball
Basketball	Color Guard
Crew	Crew
eSports	eSports
Grappling	Field Hockey
HEMA	Grappling
Lacrosse	HEMA
Pickleball	Lacrosse
Roundnet	Pickleball
Rugby	Roundnet
Soccer	Rugby
Swimming & diving	Soccer
Tennis	Softball
Track and field^{†}	Swimming & diving
Ultimate Frisbee	Tennis
Volleyball	Track and field^{†}
	Ultimate Frisbee
	Volleyball
† – Track and field includes both indoor and outdoor

=== Football ===
From 2011-2013, Virginia Commonwealth University fielded a club football team and joined the National Club Football Association. Prior to the fielding of the team, there was an enduring debate on whether or not the school should field a varsity football team sometime in the near future. Former University President, Eugene P. Trani, has been quoted to never field a football team during his administration. The club coaches for the football team were Lamar and Alfonso Bell.

=== Ice hockey ===
The VCU men's ice hockey team ceased playing after the 2021-2022 season in the CHF. They played in the Blue Ridge Hockey Conference (BRHC, now ACCHL) of the American Collegiate Hockey Association. The team, formed in 1994, has always competed amongst the top teams in their division. The team was coached by Michael Fisher, assistant coach John H Hussar and goalie coach Bobby Dillon. The team captured its first conference championship during the 2008-29 season. VCU also won the ECCHA championship in 2018–2019.In fall 2019, John H Hussar would take over as head coach. The team had a longstanding rivalry with the University of Richmond ice hockey team which drew a sizeable crowds. The team played their home games at the Richmond Ice Zone, and its motto was “NONE of us, are as STRONG as ALL of US.”

=== Lacrosse ===
The Rams Lacrosse Club began competitive play in 2004 with the National College Lacrosse League (NCLL). The club embraces players with and without experience in the sport, often giving new players the opportunity to excel at the club level alongside skilled ones. Rams Lacrosse competes as a Division II team in the Tidewater Division of the NCLL, against Christopher Newport, William & Mary, and cross-town rival University of Richmond. Club highlights include claiming first place in 2005 at the Old Dominion Shootout in Lynchburg over Liberty University, and their best-ever finish in 2007. The club claimed the Tidewater Division title and made it to the second round of the playoffs.

=== Rugby ===
The VCU men’s rugby team took the 2005 Virginia Rugby Union and the Mid-Atlantic Rugby Football Union Division III Collegiate Championships and received a bid to play in the East Coast Championship which was hosted by VCU April 22–24 of 2006. The team took fourth at the East Coast Championship tournament. Following their Division III success, they accepted an invitation to move to Division II in the Fall of 2006. The club currently competes in the National Collegiate Rugby league (NCR) in the Southern Rugby Conference.

== Facilities ==
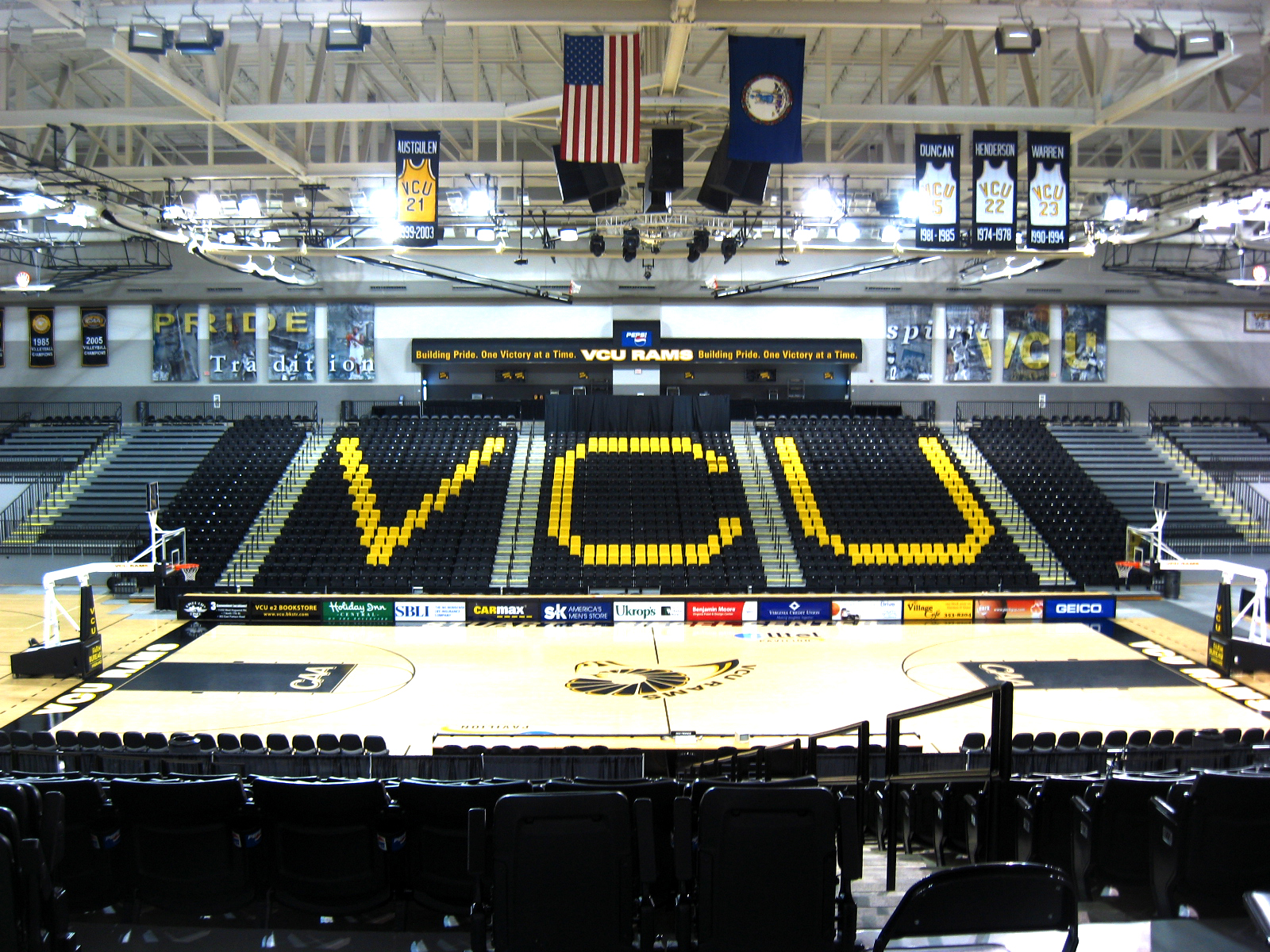
Interior of the Stuart Siegel Center, home of the basketball and volleyball teams.

- The Diamond
  - Baseball
- Stuart C. Siegel Center
  - Basketball
  - Volleyball
- Sports Backers Stadium
  - Soccer
  - Track and Field
- Cary Street Field
  - Lacrosse
  - Field Hockey
- Thalhimer Tennis Center
