= VCU Rams women's lacrosse =

- Founded: 2015
- University: Virginia Commonwealth University
- Head coach: Nicole Flores
- Stadium: Cary Street Field (capacity: 700)
- Location: Richmond, Virginia
- Conference: Atlantic 10
- Colors: Black and gold

The VCU Rams women's lacrosse team represent Virginia Commonwealth University in the National Collegiate Athletic Association (NCAA) Division I women's college lacrosse competition. The team started in the 2015–16 academic year. The Rams play their home games at Cary Street Field, located on the school's Monroe Park campus in Richmond, Virginia.

The Rams play in the Atlantic 10 Conference.
