= Devon Fisher =

American soccer player (born 1993)

Personal information
- Date of birth: October 22, 1993 (age 33)
- Place of birth: Chesapeake, Virginia, United States
- Height: 1.78 m (5 ft 10 in)
- Position: Defender

Youth career
- 2011–2014: VCU Rams
- 2012: Mississippi Brilla

Senior career*
Years	Team	Apps	(Gls)
2014–2015	Portland Timbers U23s	21	(1)
2015	Portland Timbers 2	4	(0)
2016	Seattle Sounders FC 2	25	(0)
2017	Jacksonville Armada	6	(0)
- * Club domestic league appearances and goals as of 11:25, 30 October 2017 (UTC)

Devon Fisher (born October 22, 1993) is an American soccer player who most recently played for Jacksonville Armada in the NASL.

== Career ==
=== College and amateur ===
Fisher played four years of college soccer at Virginia Commonwealth University between 2011 and 2014, including a red-shirted year in 2011.

During and after college, Fisher played with Premier Development League side Portland Timbers U23s.

=== Professional ===
Fisher joined United Soccer League club Portland Timbers 2 in 2015, following a spell with Portland's PDL side.

The NASL club Jacksonville Armada FC announced his signing on March 9, 2017 He left the club ahead of the 2018 season.

== Personal ==
Fisher is the brother of Pittsburgh Riverhounds soccer player Ritchie Duffie.
