= Joseph Haboush =

American soccer player

Personal information
- Full name: Joseph Sam Haboush
- Date of birth: August 28, 1990 (age 36)
- Place of birth: Richmond, Virginia, United States
- Height: 5 ft 9 in (1.75 m)
- Position: Midfielder

Youth career
- Richmond Strikers

College career
Years	Team	Apps	(Gls)
2008–2012	VCU Rams	35	(1)

Senior career*
Years	Team	Apps	(Gls)
2013	Richmond Kickers	11	(1)
2013–2016	Safa	46	(3)
Total		57	(4)
- * Club domestic league appearances and goals

Joseph Haboush (born August 28, 1990) is an American former soccer player who played as a midfielder. He is of Lebanese descent.

== Career ==
=== Early career ===
Haboush started his youth playing career with the Richmond Strikers Under-16 Academy and the Elite Under-18 Academy before playing Division 1 college soccer with the VCU Rams of Virginia Commonwealth University from 2008 to 2012. While at VCU Haboush made 56 appearances for the soccer team and scored three goals at the same time along with 10 assists. Haboush also went to high-school at Benedictine High School where he earned first team All-Metro player honors while helping the team win the State Championship in 2006.

=== Richmond Kickers ===
On February 12, 2013, it was officially announced that Haboush was the first signing for the Richmond Kickers, his local side, of the USL Pro. On April 6, Haboush made his debut for the Richmond Kickers against the Pittsburgh Riverhounds in which he started and played the whole 90 minutes as the match ended tied at 0–0.

=== Safa ===
On October 18, 2013, it was officially announced that Haboush signed a contract with Safa of the Lebanese Premier League.
