= Nikita Kotlov =

American soccer player

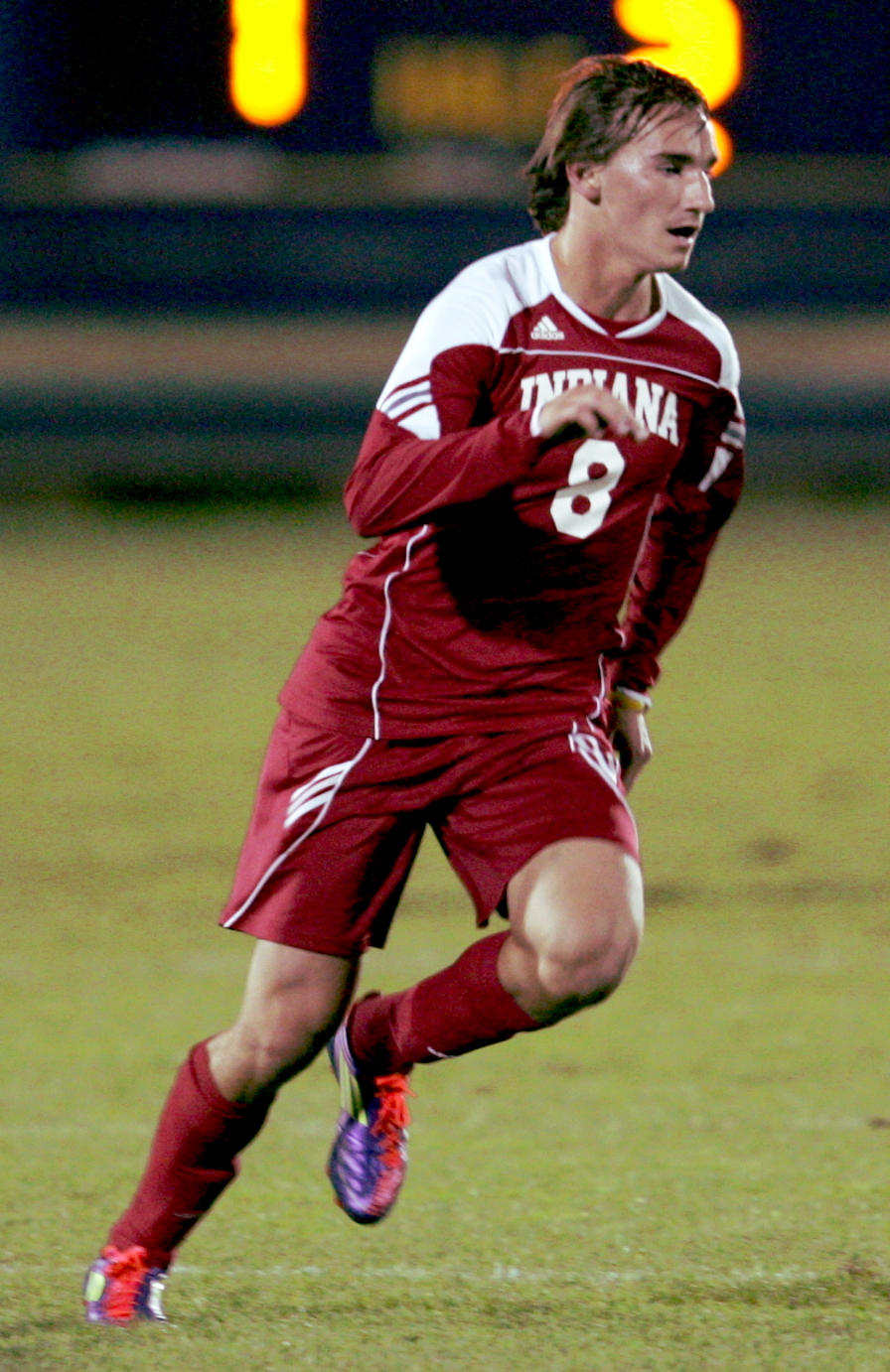
- Kotlov playing for Indiana in 2011

Personal information
- Date of birth: September 20, 1991 (age 35)
- Place of birth: Indianapolis, Indiana, United States
- Height: 5 ft 9 in (1.75 m)
- Position: Midfielder

Team information
- Current team: Mosta
- Number: 12

Youth career
- 2008–2010: Carmel United
- 2010–2013: Indiana Hoosiers

Senior career*
Years	Team	Apps	(Gls)
2015	Saint Louis FC	3	(0)
2019–2020	Mosta	9	(6)
- * Club domestic league appearances and goals as of 00:14, 9 December 2019 (UTC)

Nikita Kotlov (born September 20, 1991) is an American soccer player who plays for Maltese club Mosta FC.

== Career ==
=== College ===
Kotlov spent his entire college career at Indiana University. He made a total of 85 appearances for the Hoosiers, tallying 26 goals and 14 assists. On December 9, 2012, he scored the game-winning goal in the College Cup final over Georgetown.

=== Professional ===
On January 21, 2014, Kotlov was selected in the fourth round (73rd overall) of the 2014 MLS SuperDraft by the Portland Timbers, but was cut prior to the start of the season.

On March 24, 2015, Kotlov signed a contract with United Soccer League club Saint Louis FC. He made his professional debut on April 2 in a 2–0 victory over the Tulsa Roughnecks.

On August 24, 2019, Kotlov signed a contract with Mosta FC of the Maltese Premier League.
