= Ritchie Duffie =

American soccer player (born 1992)

Personal information
- Date of birth: August 11, 1992 (age 34)
- Place of birth: Virginia Beach, Virginia, United States
- Height: 1.83 m (6 ft 0 in)
- Positions: Defender; midfielder

College career
Years	Team	Apps	(Gls)
2011	NC Wesleyan Battling Bishops	18	(2)
2012–2014	VCU Rams	41	(3)

Senior career*
Years	Team	Apps	(Gls)
2010	Hampton Roads Piranhas	4	(0)
2012	Virginia Beach Piranhas	4	(0)
2013	Chesterfield United FC		
2014	Seattle Sounders FC U-23	2	(0)
2015	Fredericksburg FC		
2017	Pittsburgh Riverhounds	10	(0)
2018	Lionsbridge FC	3	(0)
- * Club domestic league appearances and goals as of September 23, 2021

Ritchie Duffie (born August 11, 1992) is an American soccer player.

== Career ==
Dufffie played four years of college soccer, one year at North Carolina Wesleyan College in 2011, before moving to Virginia Commonwealth University in 2012.

While at college, Duffie also appeared for Premier Development League sides Virginia Beach Piranhas and Seattle Sounders FC U-23, as well as National Premier Soccer League side Chesterfield United FC.

Following his senior season, Duffie appeared for NPSL side Fredericksburg FC.

Duffie signed with United Soccer League side Pittsburgh Riverhounds in November 2016, following a successful trial. On November 30, 2017, the Riverhounds declined the option on Duffie's contract, after he appeared in just 10 USL games for the club.

== Personal ==
Duffie is the brother of Jacksonville Armada FC soccer player Devon Fisher.
