= Jimmy Nealis =

American soccer player (born 1991)

Personal information
- Full name: James Nealis
- Date of birth: August 5, 1991 (age 35)
- Place of birth: Massapequa, New York, United States
- Height: 1.83 m (6 ft 0 in)
- Position: Defender

Team information
- Current team: New York Pancyprian-Freedoms

Youth career
- 2001–2009: Massapequa SC

College career
Years	Team	Apps	(Gls)
2009–2012	Georgetown Hoyas		

Senior career*
Years	Team	Apps	(Gls)
2010–2011	Long Island Rough Riders	26	(0)
2013–2014	New York Cosmos	3	(0)
2015–2016	Long Island Rough Riders	2	(0)
2017	New York Greek American		
2022–	New York Pancyprian-Freedoms		
- * Club domestic league appearances and goals as of October 25, 2023

James Nealis (born August 5, 1991) is an American soccer player who most recently played professionally for the New York Cosmos in the North American Soccer League. As of October 2023, Nealis plays for New York Pancyprian-Freedoms.

== Career ==
=== College and amateur ===
Nealis spent his entire collegiate career at Georgetown University. In 2009, he made a total of 19 appearances for the Hoyas and tallied two goals and two assists. In his sophomore year in 2010, Nealis was part of Georgetown's defense that recorded nine shutouts as he started all 20 games for the Hoyas and recorded four assists and led the club to a Big East Blue Division title during the regular season. He went on to be named NSCAA Third Team All-Northeast Region that year. In 2011, Nealis went on to be named Third Team All-BIG EAST as he started all 18 games he appeared in and helped the Hoyas defense to seven shutouts. In his senior year in 2012, Nealis started all 26 games and led the Hoyas to the 2012 College Cup final where they eventually fall to Indiana 1–0. He was also named NSCAA Second Team All-Northeast Region.

During his time in College, Nealis also played for Long Island Rough Riders in the USL Premier Development League.

=== Professional ===
On January 17, 2013, Nealis was drafted in the second round (37th overall) of the 2013 MLS SuperDraft by the Houston Dynamo. However, he was cut from preseason camp a month later.

On October 25, Nealis signed with NASL club New York Cosmos for the remainder of the 2013 season. He made his professional debut a week later in a 1–0 victory over Atlanta Silverbacks in the final game of the 2013 NASL Fall Season.

Nealis made his first appearance of the 2014 season on May 31, 2014, earning the start at left back and contributing to a 3–0 shutout road victory over the Fort Lauderdale Strikers.

Nealis saw 180 minutes of action in two starts and two appearances during the 2014 season.

Nealis was released following the end of the 2014 season.

In 2017, Nealis featured for Greek American AA of the Cosmopolitan Soccer League.

Nealis helped New York Pancyprian-Freedoms to the 2022 Eastern Premier Soccer League Metropolitan Division title. He also appeared for the club during their 2024 U.S. Open Cup qualifiers.

Nealis played in the inaugural edition of The Soccer Tournament for Charlotte FC.
