= 2012 UCLA Bruins men's soccer team =

UCLA Bruins
2012 season
- Stadium: Drake Stadium
- Pac-12: 1st
- NCAA Tournament: Second round
Home colors	Away colors

2012 Pac-12 men's soccer standings
	Conf.					Overall
Team	W		L		T	W		L		T
No. 13 UCLA†	8	–	1	–	1	13	–	3	–	3
No. 24 Washington	7	–	1	–	2	13	–	5	–	3
Stanford	5	–	4	–	1	9	–	8	–	1
California	3	–	5	–	2	8	–	7	–	3
San Diego State	1	–	7	–	2	7	–	9	–	3
Oregon State	1	–	7	–	2	6	–	9	–	3
$ – Conference champion; As of December 11, 2012; Rankings from NSCAA

The 2012 UCLA Bruins men's soccer team played the college's 77th season of organized men's college soccer. 2012 was the team's third full season in the Pac-12 Conference; it had previously played as an independent team. The team won the Pac-12 Conference championship, but fell to the University of San Diego in the NCAA Tournament.

== Competitions ==
=== Regular season ===
==== Match reports ====
August 24, 2012 1	#6 New Mexico	3–2	#2 UCLA	Los Angeles
7:00 PM PDT	McKendry (yellow card) 44'; Sandoval 57', 75'; Smith 60'	Report	Hollingshead 44'; Raynr 62'; Williams 80'	Stadium: Drake Stadium; Attendance: 1,105; Referee: Juan Guzman

August 31, 2012 2	#11 UCLA	2–2 (a.e.t.)	#6 Maryland	College Park, Maryland
4:30 PM PDT	Williams 9', 14' (yellow card) 96'; McKenna (yellow card) 86'	Report	Metzger 9'; Stertzer 68' (yellow card) 95'	Stadium: Ludwig Field; Attendance: 6,562; Referee: Ben Hichak

September 2, 2012 3	#11 UCLA	1–0 (a.e.t.)	Virginia	Charlottesville, Virginia
4:00 PM PDT	Sofia (yellow card) 31' 100'; Wiet (yellow card) 73'	Report	Somerville (yellow card) 41'; Madison (yellow card) 74'; Salandy-Defour (yellow card) 82'	Stadium: Ludwig Field; Attendance: 2,167; Referee: Mohammad Samadpour

September 7, 2012 4	Tulsa	0–1	#14 UCLA	Los Angeles
4:00 PM PDT	Rocha (yellow card) 13'	Report	Estrada 44'	Stadium: Drake Stadium; Referee: Miguel Chicas

September 9, 2012 5	#11 UC Irvine	1–2	#14 UCLA	Los Angeles
2:00 PM PDT	Pitts (yellow card) 30'; Iwasa 71'	Report	Torre (yellow card) 79'; Monge 83'; Estrada 87'	Stadium: Drake Stadium; Attendance: 1,454; Referee: Miguel Chicas

September 16, 2012 6	Loyola Marymount	0–1	#7 UCLA	Los Angeles
2:00 PM PDT	Clifton (yellow card) 39'	Report	Hollingshead 54' (yellow card) 56'	Stadium: Drake Stadium; Attendance: 621; Referee: Frank Anderson

September 21, 2012 7	#9 UCLA	1–1 (a.e.t.)	#3 UC Santa Barbara	Santa Barbara, California
6:00 PM PDT	Monge 11'; Torre (yellow card) 108'	Report	Boateng 68'	Stadium: Harder Stadium; Attendance: 7,542; Referee: Miquel Chicas

September 23, 2012 8	#12 UCLA	1–0	Cal Poly	San Luis Obispo, California
4:00 PM PDT	Monge 46'; Sofia (yellow card) 55'; Howe (yellow card) 62'	Report	Duran (yellow card) 47'	Stadium: Spanos Stadium; Attendance: 2,895; Referee: Ian Anderson

September 28, 2012 9	#9 UCLA	3–1	Stanford	Palo Alto, California
4:00 PM PDT	Monge 21' (yellow card) 46'; Edwards (yellow card) 38'; Hollingshead (yellow card) 45'; Estrada 45'; Williams 82'	Report	Jahn 61'	Stadium: Cagan Stadium; Attendance: 1,106; Referee: Younes Marrakchi

September 30, 2012 10	#9 UCLA	3–1	California	Berkeley, California
4:00 PM PDT	Chavez 55'; Munoz 61'; Hollingshead 73'; Fender (yellow card) 79'	Report	Salciccia (yellow card) 8'; Casiple 89'	Stadium: Edwards Stadium; Attendance: 1,003; Referee: Younes Marrakchi

October 5, 2012 11	Oregon State	0–1	#8 UCLA	Los Angeles
3:00 PM PDT	T. Anderson (yellow card) 34'; Harms (yellow card) 48'; B. Anderson (yellow card) 88'	Report	Chavez 65'	Stadium: Drake Stadium; Attendance: 860; Referee: Paul Scott

October 8, 2012 12	Washington	2–1	#8 UCLA	Los Angeles
7:00 PM PDT	Sackeyfio 14'; Gallagher 60'	Report	Monge (yellow card) 42'; Raynr 72'	Stadium: Drake Stadium; Attendance: 1,051; Referee: Richard Heron

October 12, 2012 13	#4 UCLA	4–3	San Diego State	San Diego
7:00 PM PDT	Sofia 7' (yellow card) 8'; Monge (yellow card) 30'; Williams 40', 59'; Stolz (yellow card) 77'; Chavez 84'	Report	Ongaro 26'; Ozbay 51'; Wise 82'	Stadium: Sports Deck; Attendance: 1,321; Referee: Miguel Chicas

October 26, 2012 14	#7 UCLA	2–1	Oregon State	Corvallis, Oregon
1:00 PM PDT	Chavez 17'; Hollingshead 42'	Report	Seymore (yellow card) 61'; Welshman 67'	Stadium: Lorenz Field; Attendance: 177; Referee: Said Ravanfar

October 29, 2012 15	#7 UCLA	1–0	#24 Washington	Seattle
1:00 PM PDT	Hollingshead 13'; Sofia (yellow card) 72'; Monge (yellow card) 81'	Report	Moberg (yellow card) 65'	Stadium: Husky Soccer Stadium; Attendance: 1,341; Referee: Yader Reyes

November 1, 2012 16	Stanford	1–2 (a.e.t.)	#5 UCLA	Los Angeles
7:00 PM PDT	Koval 73'	Report	Chavez 16'; Hollingshead (yellow card) 63'; Monge 103'	Stadium: Drake Stadium; Attendance: 952; Referee: Paul Scott

November 4, 2012 17	California	1–1 (a.e.t.)	#5 UCLA	Los Angeles
7:00 PM PDT	Sundley 41'; Sekine (yellow card) 50'	Report	Williams 54'; Wiet (yellow card) 64'	Stadium: Drake Stadium; Attendance: 2,461; Referee: Paul Scott

November 9, 2012 18	San Diego State	1–2	#5 UCLA	Los Angeles
7:00 PM PDT	Bick 54'	Report	Hollingshead 56'; Stolz (yellow card) 69'; Williams 73'	Stadium: Drake Stadium; Attendance: 1,263; Referee: Ali Hacock

=== NCAA Tournament ===
November 18, 2012 Second round	#23 San Diego	5–2	#4 (#6) UCLA	Los Angeles
4:00 PM PDT				Stadium: Drake Stadium
