= Christian Blandon =

American soccer player (born 1992)

Personal information
- Date of birth: 2 October 1992 (age 34)
- Place of birth: Cali, Colombia
- Height: 6 ft 0 in (1.83 m)
- Position: Attacking midfielder

Team information
- Current team: Florida Tropics SC

College career
Years	Team	Apps	(Gls)
2011–2014	Creighton Bluejays	60	(7)

Senior career*
Years	Team	Apps	(Gls)
2012	VSI Tampa Flames	9	(2)
2013	Ocala Stampede	9	(2)
2015	Fort Lauderdale Strikers	2	(0)
2016–2018	Florida Tropics SC (indoor)	7	(0)

International career^{‡}
2017–	United States beach	3	(0)
- * Club domestic league appearances and goals as of January 24, 2019 ‡ National team caps and goals as of January 11, 2018

Christian Blandon (born October 2, 1992) is a professional soccer player who is a current member of the United States national beach soccer team.

== Career ==
=== College and Youth ===
Blandon played four years of college soccer at Creighton University between 2011 and 2014.

While at college, Blandon also appeared for USL PDL club VSI Tampa Flames and Ocala Stampede.

=== Professional ===
On March 30, 2015, Blandon signed with North American Soccer League side Fort Lauderdale Strikers. Following the 2016 North American Soccer League season, Blandon began playing indoor soccer with the Major Arena Soccer League's Florida Tropics SC. On November 18, 2016, Blandon was officially released by the Strikers.

September 18, 2017, called up to the US National Beach soccer team and on October 20, 2017, makes his first international debut against France in a 6–5 win in Puerta Vallarta Cup in Mexico.
