= Michael Harris (soccer) =

American soccer player

Personal information
- Full name: Michael Ryan Harris
- Date of birth: October 3, 1991 (age 35)
- Place of birth: Seattle, Washington, United States
- Height: 1.78 m (5 ft 10 in)
- Position: Defender

Youth career
- Snohomish United

College career
Years	Team	Apps	(Gls)
2010–2013	Washington Huskies	86	(4)

Senior career*
Years	Team	Apps	(Gls)
2011	Washington Crossfire	14	(0)
2013	Seattle Sounders FC U-23	9	(0)
2015–2017	Oklahoma City Energy	57	(0)
- * Club domestic league appearances and goals as of 12:56, 21 October 2017 (UTC)

Michael Ryan Harris (born October 3, 1991) is an American soccer player. He is best known for his flip-throw.

== Career ==
=== College and amateur ===
Harris spent his entire college career at the University of Washington. He made a total of 76 appearances for the Huskies and tallied four goals and 19 assists.

He also played in the Premier Development League for Washington Crossfire and Seattle Sounders FC U-23.

=== Professional ===
On January 27, 2015, Harris signed a professional contract with USL club Oklahoma City Energy FC. He made his professional debut on March 28 in a 1–1 draw against Tulsa Roughnecks FC.
