= Ed McLaughlin =

American college athletic director

Current position
- Title: Athletic director
- Team: VCU
- Conference: A-10

Biographical details
- Education: Boston College, American University

Administrative career (AD unless noted)
- 1998–2000: Merrimack (Assistant AD)
- 2000–2006: American (Associate AD)
- 2006–2012: Niagara
- 2012–present: VCU

Ed McLaughlin is the current director of athletics for Virginia Commonwealth University. He previously served as athletic director for Niagara University from 2006 to 2012, and as an assistant athletic director at American University and Merrimack College prior to his tenure at Niagara. During his tenure at Niagara, he made the decision to eliminate the school's women's ice hockey program in 2012, as part of an effort to re-allocate resources towards starting a women's lacrosse team, per new Metro Atlantic Athletic Conference league rules. McLaughlin graduated from Boston College with a bachelor's degree in 1995, and American University with a master's degree in 2005. McLaughlin was named athletic director at Virginia Commonwealth University on July 24, 2012.
