= Michael Calderón =

Costa Rican footballer (born 1988)

Personal information
- Date of birth: 6 December 1988 (age 37)
- Place of birth: San José, Costa Rica
- Height: 1.73 m (5 ft 8 in)
- Position: Attacking midfielder

College career
Years	Team	Apps	(Gls)
2010–2011	Fairleigh Dickinson Knights	32	(3)
2012–2013	New Mexico Lobos	41	(10)

Senior career*
Years	Team	Apps	(Gls)
2014	Wilmington Hammerheads	2	(0)
2015–2016	Kraft	19	(1)

International career
- Costa Rica U17
- Costa Rica U20
- * Club domestic league appearances and goals as of June 1, 2014

Michael Calderón (born December 6, 1988) is a Costa Rican professional footballer who plays as a midfielder.

== Career ==
=== Early career ===
Calderón played two years of college soccer at Fairleigh Dickinson University between 2010 and 2011, before transferring to the University of New Mexico, where he played in 2012 and 2013.

=== Professional career ===
On January 21, 2014, Calderón was drafted in the fourth round (64th overall) of the 2014 MLS SuperDraft by Vancouver Whitecaps FC. However, he wasn't signed by the club.

Calderón signed with USL Pro club Wilmington Hammerheads on April 2, 2014. He is now a soccer coach at Indian Hills and the RYSA wildcats. He focuses on possession and passing of the ball.
