= Dennis Castillo =

Costa Rican footballer (born 1993)

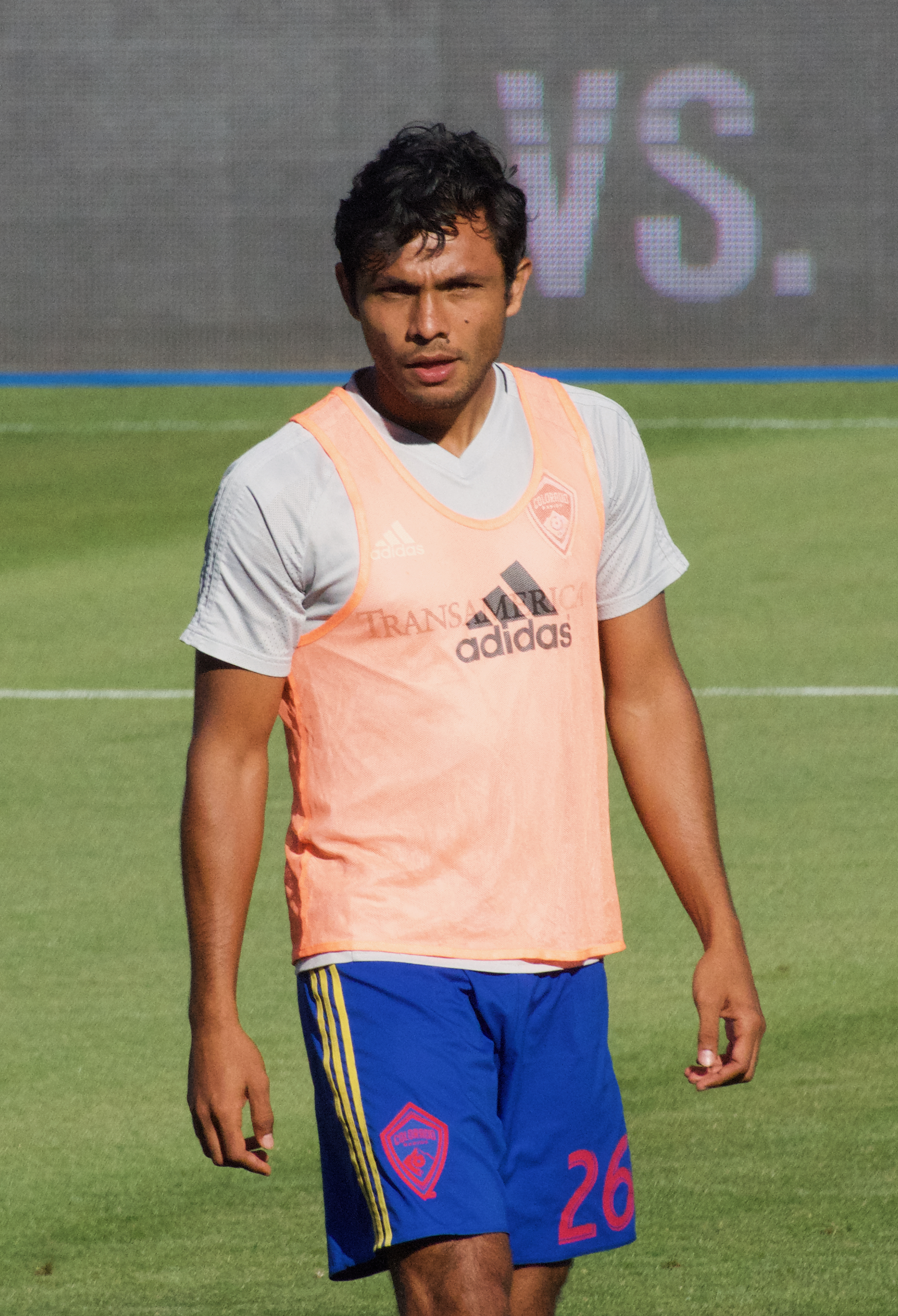
- Castillo in 2017

Personal information
- Full name: Dennis Esteban Castillo Romero
- Date of birth: April 30, 1993 (age 33)
- Place of birth: Desamparados, Costa Rica
- Height: 1.78 m (5 ft 10 in)
- Position: Defender

Youth career
- 2006–2011: Saprissa

College career
Years	Team	Apps	(Gls)
2012–2015	VCU Rams	80	(17)

Senior career*
Years	Team	Apps	(Gls)
2014-2015	Portland Timbers U23s	20	(1)
2016–2017	Colorado Rapids	11	(1)
2016–2017	→ Charlotte Independence (loan)	13	(2)
2018–2021	Pérez Zeledón	89	(5)
2021–2024	Sporting San José	105	(13)

International career
- Costa Rica U17
- Costa Rica U20
- * Club domestic league appearances and goals

Dennis Esteban Castillo Romero (born April 30, 1993) is a Costa Rican former footballer. Prior to playing for Sporting, Castillo played for Pérez Zeledón in Liga FPD, the Colorado Rapids and Portland Timbers in Major League Soccer and the Charlotte Independence in the United Soccer League. Castillo also played college soccer for the VCU Rams, and was part of the development academy for Deportivo Saprissa, one of the top clubs in Costa Rica.

== Career ==
=== Youth and college ===
Castillo signed a letter of intent to play for Virginia Commonwealth University's men's soccer program. In his freshman year, Castillo was an immediate starter and a third captain, starting all 18 matches during the 2012 season. He netted six goals in his freshman year, with his first coming on August 30, 2012, against UMBC. Ultimately, he was part of a squad that was ranked as high as 14th in the nation, and helped the Rams earn their first NCAA Tournament berth for the first time since 2004. His freshman year success earned him several allocates including the 2012 All-Atlantic 10 Second Team and 2012 Atlantic 10 All-Rookie squad. Nationally, Castillo was tabbed by CollegeSoccerNews.com as a Freshman All-American and was selected by the National Soccer Coaches Association of America to the Second Team All-Mid-Atlantic Region.

During his sophomore year, Castillo remained a starter and scored six goals and had an assist in the 21 matches he played in 2013. He helped the Rams earn a national ranking as high as eighth in the nation, their highest in over 10 years, and helped the Rams qualify for a second-consecutive NCAA Tournament berth. As a sophomore, Castillo earned All-Atlantic 10 First Team, the NSCAA All-Mid Atlantic Region First Team, and VaSID All-State First Team. In his junior year, he captained the Rams and was part of a defense that ranked 11th in the nation in goals scored. During his senior year, he helped the Rams reach the 2015 Atlantic 10 Men's Soccer Tournament championship game, and was named with conference honors.

=== Professional ===
On January 11, 2016, Castillo was selected 37th overall in the 2016 MLS SuperDraft by Colorado Rapids. He made his debut on April 23, 2016, coming on for Eric Miller in the 60th minute. Castillo had an assist in his debut assisting Kevin Doyle in a 3–1 victory over visiting Seattle Sounders FC. On April 28, 2016, it was announced that Castillo would go on a season-long loan to Charlotte Independence of the United Soccer League. However, after one game he returned to the Rapids. On June 22, 2016, Castillo made his first MLS start for Colorado, playing in the entire 90 minutes in a 1–1 draw at LA Galaxy. His contracted option was declined by Colorado at the end of the 2017 season.

On January 5, 2018, Castillo signed with Pérez Zeledón in his native Costa Rica.

== Honors ==
- PDL Defensive Player of the Year: 2015
