= Irwin Belk Track and Field Center/Transamerica Field =

Stadium in Charlotte, North Carolina

Coordinates: 35°18′19.79″N 80°44′17.14″W

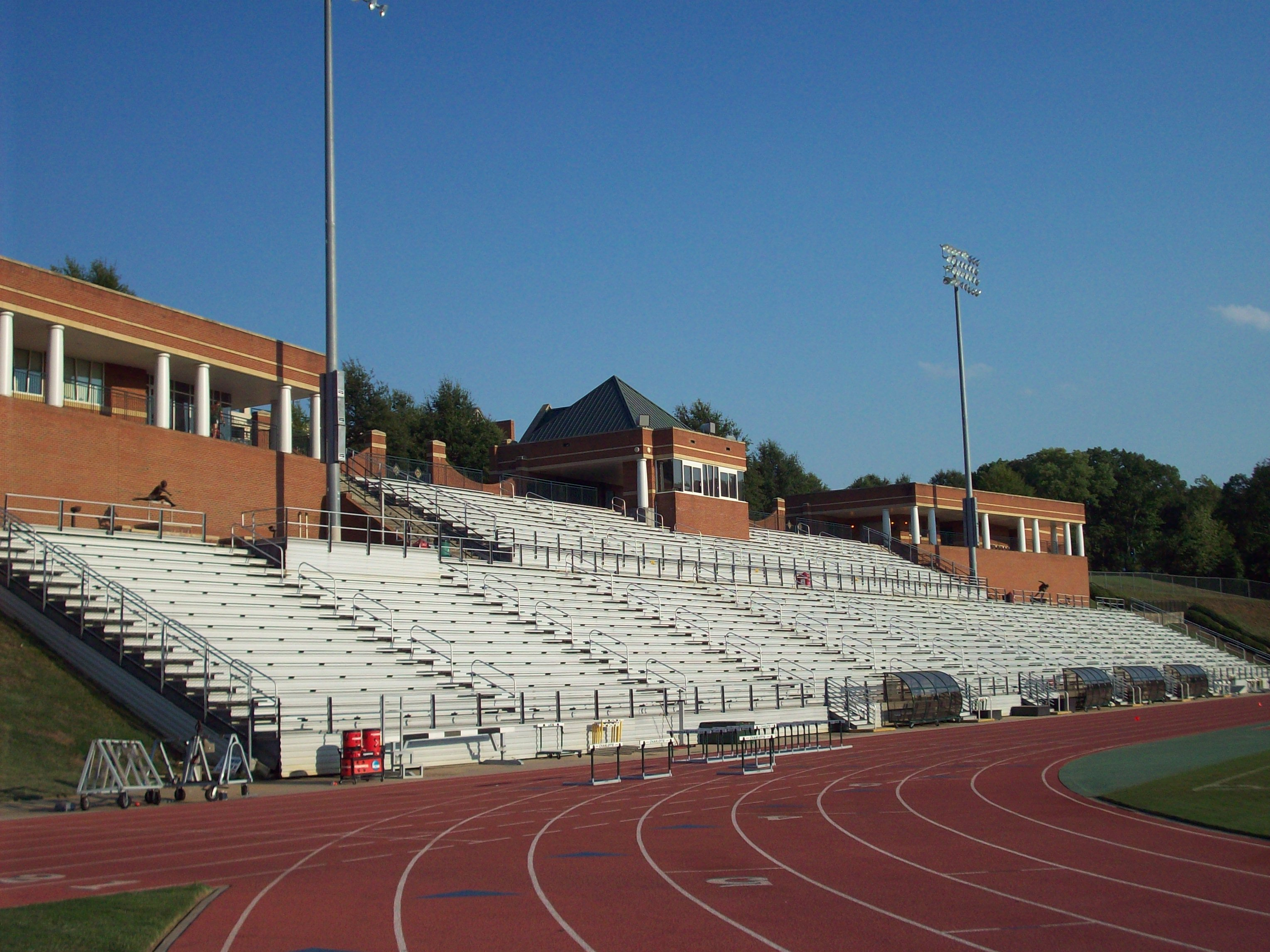
- Stands and athletics track of the stadium in 2011
- Interactive map of Irwin Belk Track and Field Center/Transamerica Field
- Address: United States
- Owner: University of North Carolina at Charlotte
- Operator: UNC at Charlotte Athletics
- Capacity: 4,000
- Surface: Natural grass
- Field size: 10,500 sq ft
- Current use: Soccer; Track and field

Construction
- Opened: February 25, 1996; 30 years ago
- Cost: $2.1 million US ($4.31 million in 2025 dollars)
- Architects: Overcash Demmitt Architects, Tony F. Miller, AIA Designer
- General contractor: Rodgers Builders

Tenants
- Charlotte 49ers (NCAA) teams: men's soccer (1996–present); Professional teams / events: Charlotte Eagles (2001–2002); cup matches

Website
- charlotte49ers.com/stadium

The Irwin Belk Track and Field Center/Transamerica Field is a stadium located on the campus of the University of North Carolina at Charlotte. Finished in 1996, the stadium is home to the Charlotte 49ers men's soccer and track and field teams.

The facility includes the Southeast's first eight-lane continuous radius track with full-depth polyurethane surface; and 10,500 square feet of internal space including coaches' offices, locker rooms and a hospitality suite in the North Pavilion. Public restrooms, concessions and the press box are located in the South Pavilion. The Central Pavilion contains the ticket booths, Wall of Champions and Recognition Center.

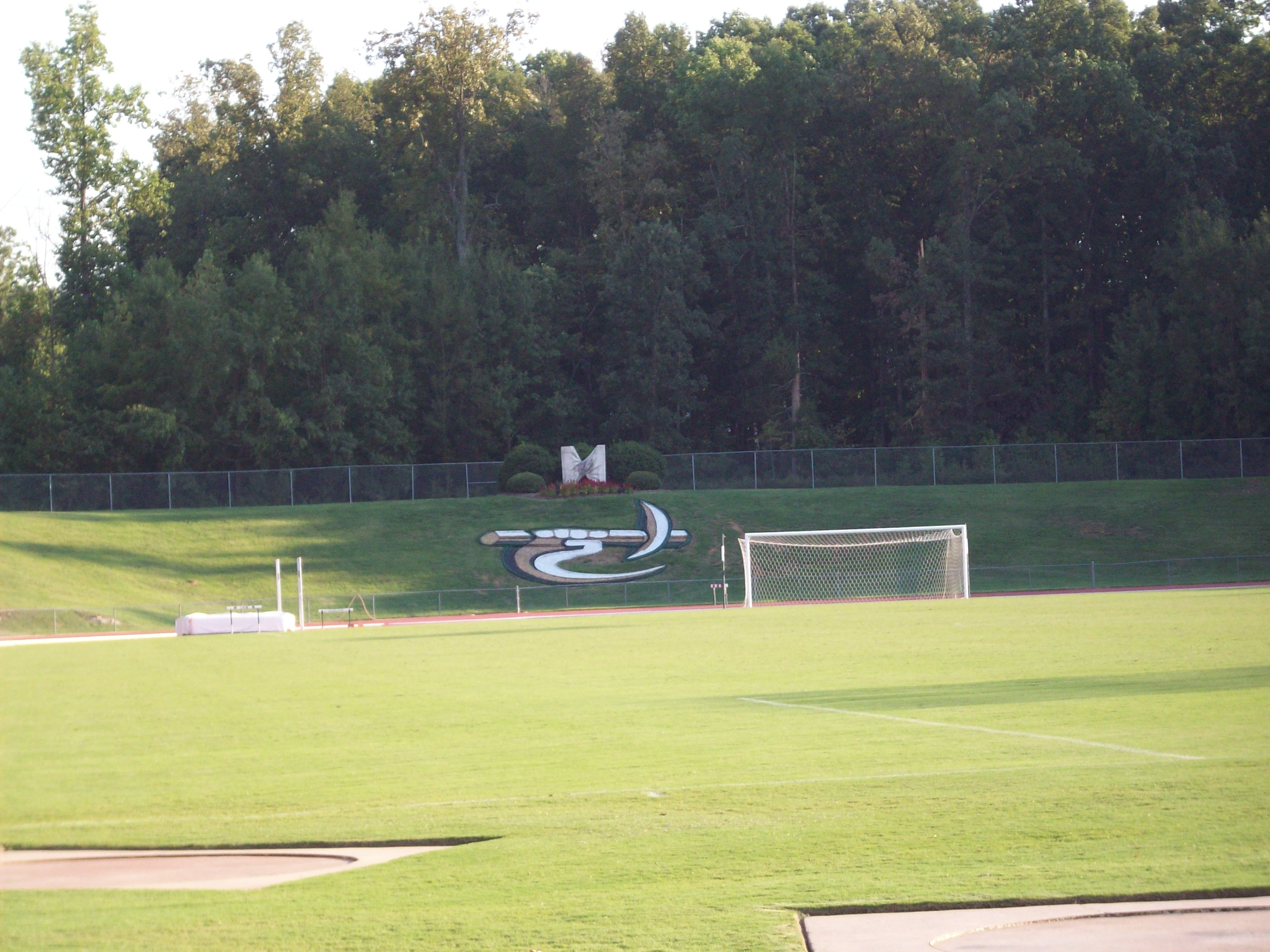
Far end of the field, where soccer games are hosted

Track events held in the Center include high jump, pole vault, long jump, and triple jump. The 120-by-75-yard (110 by 69 m) natural grass playing surface is the home field for the 49ers men's and women's soccer teams, and also accommodates shot put, discus, javelin and hammer throw events.

The facility has hosted several major meets for both Conference USA and the Atlantic 10 Conference. A pro soccer team, the Charlotte Eagles, have also used Transamerica Field for home games.

Originally considered for expansion to host the Charlotte 49ers new football team, estimates of expansion for football usage made by leading sports design firm Populous were prohibitively expensive due to location restrictions and environmental concerns involving the Toby Creek flood plain. Subsequently, the university chose to build a dedicated football stadium west of Hayes Stadium, named Jerry Richardson Stadium.

Title IX scholarship requirements related to the addition of the Charlotte 49ers football program will most likely mean that Belk will soon be home to either a potential 49ers future field hockey team or women's lacrosse team. Facilities upgrades, including the possibility of replacing the grass field with artificial turf, might be needed to handle the added usage.

== Statues ==
The facility features six Richard Hallier athletic statues depicting sports played at the center. Four along the front entrance feature a male relay runner, a female long-distance runner and male and female soccer players. On the field side in front of the north and south pavilions respectively are statues of a female hurdler and a male discus thrower. There are eight more Hallier sports statues on the UNC Charlotte campus, all of which were donated by Charlotte businessman and philanthropist Irwin Belk (part of the family which owns the Belk department store chain), who is also the namesake of the center.

Additional art work at the facility includes the Victory sculpture by Claudio Capotondi located in the south end zone of the stadium, also made possible by a financial gift by Belk.
